= 2027 FIM Women's Circuit Racing World Championship =

Racing competition

2027 FIM Women's Circuit Racing World Championship
Previous:	2026	Next:	2028
Support series: Superbike World Championship; Supersport World Championship; Sportbike World Championship; Yamaha R3 bLU cRU FIM World Cup

The 2027 FIM Women's Circuit Racing World Championship will be the fourth season of the FIM Women's Circuit Racing World Championship (WorldWCR), the premier female only circuit racing series. In a change from previous season, riders will compete on identical CFMoto 675SR-R motorcycles rather than the Yamaha YZF-R7 of previous seasons. Michelin has become supplier of the series-specified tyres, taking over from Pirelli. The rounds will be run as support races for 6 of the European rounds of the Superbike World Championship. Format of each round will be a Superpole qualifying session on Friday, Race 1 on Saturday and Race 2 on Sunday. The defending champion is Maria Herrera.

== Regulation changes ==
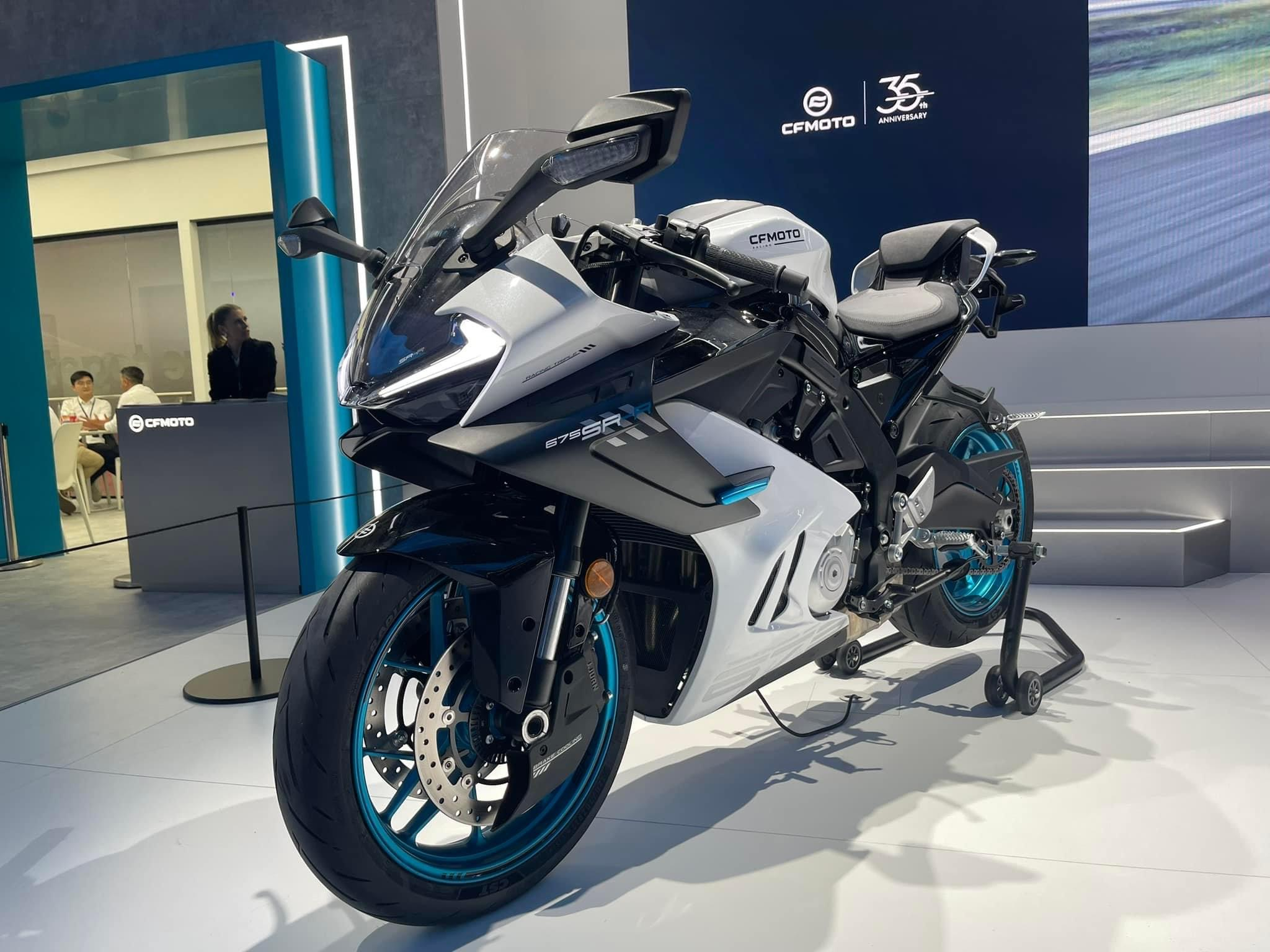
CFMoto 675SR-R

In October 2026 it was announced that CFMoto would become the sole supplier of motorcycles for the series, taking over from Yamaha who had been supplying the series since its inauguration in 2024. CFMoto and series organiser Dorna signed a deal to supply bikes for three years starting in 2027.

The motorcycle to be used is the CFMoto 675SR-R which has a 675 cc (41.2 cu in) liquid-cooled, three-cylinder engine. The Aspar Team, who are CFMoto's partner in Moto2 and Moto3 helped develop the bike. The bike has been campaigned for two years in the British Sportbike Championship. The bike is estimated to produce 15 bhp (11 kW) more than the Yamaha it replaces.

CFMoto will prepare the race bikes, supply spares and have a technical team attending the races.

Michelin takes over from Pirelli as sole tyre supplier for the WSBK series, including the WorldWCR, with an agreement for five years starting from 2027. Michelin was the sole supplier to MotoGP until the end of the 2026 season. Director of Michelin Motorsport, Matthieu Bonardel, is reported as saying supplying tyre to WSBK series will bring the tyre technology closer to road users.

== Entry list ==
Provisional 2026 entry list: Team / Constructor / Motorcycle / No. / Rider / Rounds	Key Regular rider Wildcard rider Replacement rider

== Race calendar ==
Location of races in 2027.

On 1 October 2026 the provisional 2027 WorldWCR calendar was published. The scheduled rounds were: (Note: The Circuito de Jerez, which had been the venue for the season finale in previous years, would be unavailable due to ongoing renovation works.)

Circuit	Date
(Portugal) Algarve International Circuit	19–21 March
(Spain) Circuit Ricardo Tormo	2–4 April
(Czech Republic) Autodrom Most	4–6 June
(Italy) Misano World Circuit Marco Simoncelli	18–20 June
(France) Circuit de Nevers Magny-Cours	3–5 September
(Italy) Cremona Circuit	26–26 September

A test day will be held at the Algarve Circuit on 15 March.

== Results and standings ==
2027 calendar and results
Round		Circuit	Pole position (Note: Pole for race one set by Superpole, pole for Race 2 set by fastest lap in Race 1)	Fastest lap	Winning rider	Winning team	Ref
1	R1	(Portugal) Algarve International Circuit					
1	R2	(Portugal) Algarve International Circuit					
2	R1	(Spain) Circuit Ricardo Tormo					
2	R2	(Spain) Circuit Ricardo Tormo					
3	R1	(Czech Republic) Autodrom Most					
3	R2	(Czech Republic) Autodrom Most					
4	R1	(Italy) Misano World Circuit Marco Simoncelli					
4	R2	(Italy) Misano World Circuit Marco Simoncelli					
5	R1	(France) Circuit de Nevers Magny-Cours					
5	R2	(France) Circuit de Nevers Magny-Cours					
6	R1	(Italy) Cremona Circuit					
6	R2	(Italy) Cremona Circuit					

=== Points ===
Points system
Position	1	2	3	4	5	6	7	8	9	10	11	12	13	14	15
Points	25	20	16	13	11	10	9	8	7	6	5	4	3	2	1

=== Riders' championship ===
Pos.	Rider	ALG (Portugal)	RIC (Spain)	MOS (Czech Republic)	MIS (Italy)	MAG (France)	CRE (Italy)	Pts.
