= Emily Bondi =

French motorcycle racer

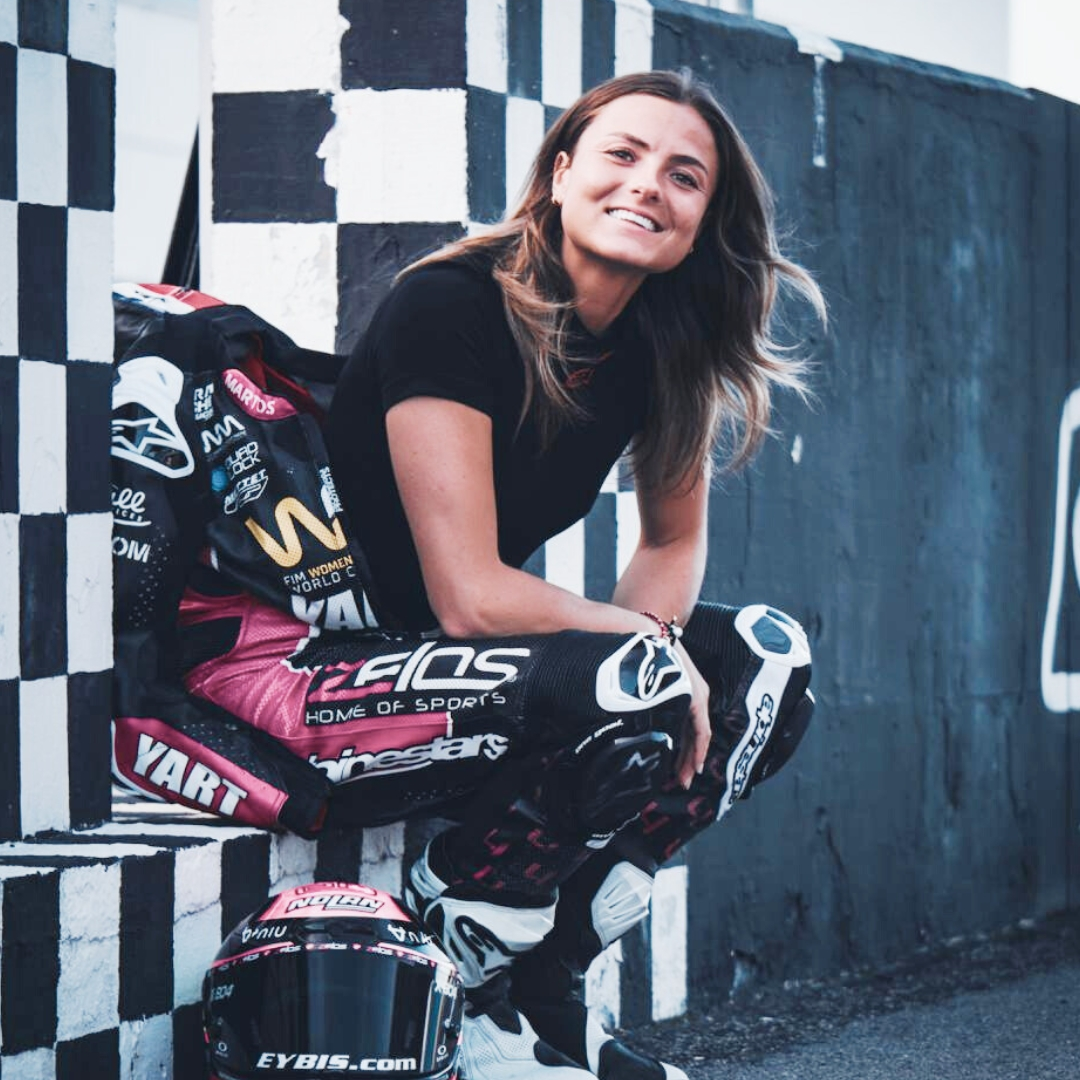
- Emily Bondi in 2024
- Born: April 14, 2001 (age 25); Neuilly-sur-Seine, France
- Occupation: Motorcycle racer
- Current series: Women's Circuit Racing World Championship
- Previous series: Championnat de France Womens Cup
- Current team: FT Racing Academy
- Previous teams: YART Zelos

Championship titles
- 2023 Championnat de France Womens Cup
Statistics
Women's Circuit Racing World Championship
| Active years | 2024- |
| Last season (2026) | 15th (26 pts) |
Starts / Wins / Podiums / Poles / F. laps / Points; 33 / 0 / 0 / 0 / 0 / 72

Emily Bondi (14 April 2001-) is a French motorcycle racer and student at the IÉSEG School of Management. In 2023, she won the Championnat de France Feminin Women's Cup Championship, and since 2024, she competed in the FIM Women's Circuit Racing World Championship.

== Biography ==
Bondi was born on 14 April 2001 in Neuilly-sur-Seine, France. She grew up in a family of bikers, who introduced her to the world of motorcycling at a very young age. She also practiced other sports at a high level, including horse-ball, alpine skiing and jetski, disciplines for which she participated in various national competitions and won several titles.

=== Competitive career ===
==== French Champion 2023 ====
Bondi made her competitive debut in 2023 at the age of 22 in the Championnat de France Womens Cup, the French women's motorcycle championship. She won five races out of the eight, reaching the podium in each event. These performances allowed her to secure the title of French champion in all categories in her first season.

==== Women's Circuit Racing World Championship ====
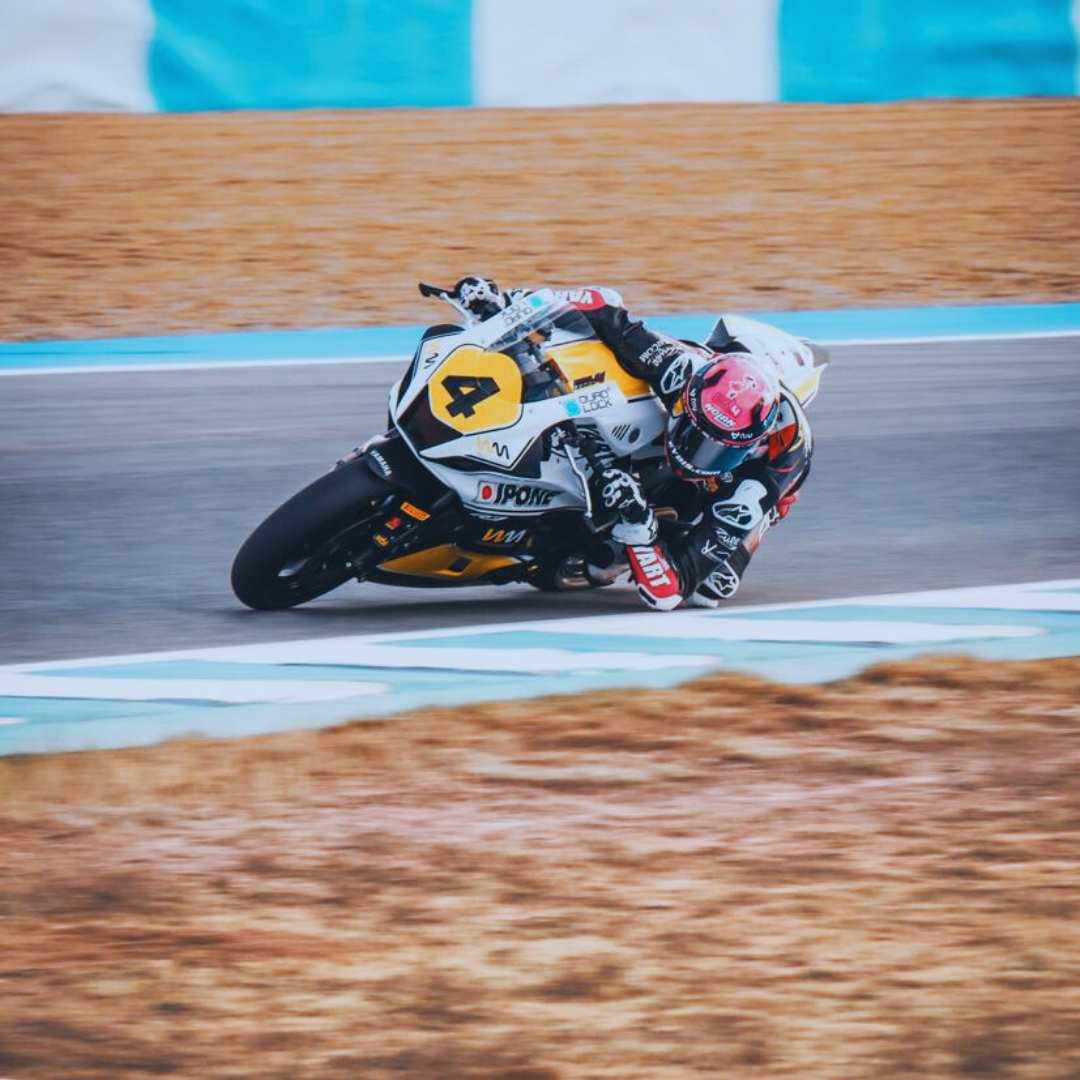
Bondi during qualification at the Jerez round of the WorldWCR October 2024

In 2024, Bondi competed in the inaugural FIM Women's Circuit Racing World Championship representing Yamaha Austrian Racing Team's two-time World Endurance Championship team, YART. She was coached by the 2021 Endurance World Champion, Xavier Siméon and trained with Johann Zarco, winner in MotoGP and double Moto2 World Champion. She finished 15th in the championship for the season despite a broken foot just before season.

In 2025, Bondi injured her hand at the penultimate round at Magny-Cours and had to sit out the finale at Jerez. She finished 19th in the championship.

Bondi changed team for 2026 joining FT Racing Academy.

== Career statistics ==
=== Championnat de France Womens Cup ===
==== Races by year ====
(key) (Races in bold indicate pole position, races in italics indicate fastest lap)

| Year | Team | Bike | 1 | 2 | 3 | 4 | 5 | 6 | 7 | 8 | Pts | Pos | Ref |
|---|---|---|---|---|---|---|---|---|---|---|---|---|---|
| 2023 | Moto Club De Comteville | Yamaha | ALE1; 3 | ALE2; 3 | PAU1; 2 | PAU1; 3 | CAR1; 1 | CAR2; 1 | ALE1; 1 | ALE2; 1 | 178 | 1st | |

=== World Women's Circuit Racing Championship ===
==== Races by year ====
(key) (Races in bold indicate pole position; races in italics indicate fastest lap)

| Year | Team | Bike | 1 | 2 | 3 | 4 | 5 | 6 | 7 | 8 | 9 | 10 | 11 | 12 | Pos | Pts | Ref |
|---|---|---|---|---|---|---|---|---|---|---|---|---|---|---|---|---|---|
| 2024 | YART Zelos Black Knights | Yamaha YZF-R7 | MIS1; 15 | MIS2; Ret | DON1; 20 | DON2; 11 | ARG1; Ret | ARG2; 11 | CRE1; 11 | CRE2; 8 | EST1; 11 | EST2; 15 | JER1; Ret | JER2; 17 | 15th | 31 | |
| 2025 | Team Zelos Trasimeno | Yamaha YZF-R7 | ASS1; 9 | ASS2; 11 | CRE1; Ret | CRE2; 13 | DON1; 19 | DON2; 18 | BAL1; 17 | BAL2; 17 | MAG1; Ret | MAG2; DNS | JER1 | JER2 | 19th | 15 | |
| 2026 | FT Racing Academy | Yamaha YZF-R7 | POR1; Ret | POR1; 16 | ASS1; 19 | ASS2; 15 | BAL1; Ret | BAL2; 14 | MIS1; 10 | MIS2; Ret | DON1; 10 | DON2; 19 | JER1; 10 | JER2; 11 | 15th | 26 | |
