= Astrid Madrigal =

Mexican motorcycle racer

- Born: 2 March 2000 (age 26); Chihuahua, Mexico
- Current series: WorldWCR
- Current team: Pons Italika Racing FIMLA
- Bike number: 83

Championship titles
- ITALIKA Women's International Cup 2018 & 2021
Statistics
WorldWCR
Active years	2024-
Current team	Pons Italika Racing FIMLA
Best season (2024)	8th (60 pts)
Last season (2026)	11th (67 pts)
Starts / Wins / Podiums / Poles / F. laps / Points; 36 / 0 / 0 / 0 / 0 / 202
WorldSSP300
Active years	2023
Team(s)	Team 109
Starts / Wins / Podiums / Poles / F. laps / Points; 2 / 0 / 0 / 0 / 0 / 0

Astrid Madrigal Barriga (born 2 March 2000) is a Mexican motorcycle racer who currently competes in the FIM Women's Circuit Racing World Championship. She is an FIM Ambassador for Latin America.

== Biography ==
Madrigal was born on 2 March 2000 in Chihuahua City, Mexico. Her passion for motorcycle racing came from her father who had competed on Superbikes in Mexico and owned a motorcycle repair shop.

=== Racing career ===
Madrigal began competing in motocross when she was six years old.

At the age of 13, Madrigal first entered the Mexican Superbike Championship. The following year she left her family home and moved to Mexico City with her coach, Jorge Pérez, to further her career. In 2015 Madrigal was runner-up in the Pan-American Speed Championship.

In 2016, Mexican motorcycle manufacturer Italika, in conjunction with Lorenzo Competición México, formed the ITALIKA Racing Team to promote motorcycle sport in the country and to fosters the development of new talent. They also set up a series of racing series. Madrigal joined the team and won the ITALIKA RT250 Sport Cup title in 2016.

Madrigal won the ITALIKA Women's International Cup in 2018, was runner-up in 2019 and won the cup again in 2021.

As a result of a collaboration between ITALIKA Racing and the Spanish Viñales Racing Team, Madrigal competed in the ESBK (Spanish Superbike Championship) Supersport 300 class in 2022 for the Spanish team. In 2023, she competed in the FIM Women's European Championship. She also raced in the final three rounds of the 2023 Supersport 300 World Championship for Team 109.

In 2024, Madrigal became an FIM Ambassador for Latin America.

ITALIKA Racing entered Madrigal for the inaugural 2024 FIM Women's Circuit Racing World Championship. She finished the season eighth overall. For 2025 ITALIKA Racing partnered with Pons Racing and Madrigal was entered for the WorldWCR for the Pons Italika Racing FIMLA team. She finished the season ninth overall. Madrigal continued with the team in 2026.

== Racing results ==
=== WorldSSP300 ===
(key) (Races in bold indicate pole position; races in italics indicate fastest lap)

Year	Bike	1	2	3	4	5	6	7	8	9	10	11	12	13	14	15	16	Pos.	Pts.	Refs
2023	Kawasaki	ASS1	ASS2	BAR1	BAR2	MIS1	MIS2	IMO1	IMO2	MOS1	MOS2	MAG1; DNQ	MAG2; DNQ	ARA1; 25	ARA2; 23	POR1; DNQ	POR2; DNQ	NC	0	

=== WorldWCR ===
(key) (Races in bold indicate pole position; races in italics indicate fastest lap)

Year	Bike	1	2	3	4	5	6	7	8	9	10	11	12	Pos.	Pts.	Refs
2024	Yamaha YZF-R7	MIS1; 12	MIS2; Ret	DON1; 13	DON2; 13	ARG1; 10	ARG2; 7	CRE1; 9	CRE2; 7	EST1; 9	EST1; 8	JER1; 13	JER2; 15	8th	60	
2025	Yamaha YZF-R7	ASS1; 8	ASS2; 8	CRE1; 4	CRE2; 6	DON1; 12	DON2; 10	BAL1; 10	BAL2; 10	MAG1; 12	MAG2; 13	JER1; 13	JER2; 12	9th	75	
2026	Yamaha YZF-R7	POR1; 18	POR1; 11	ASS1; 7	ASS2; 12	BAL1; 10	BAL2; 6	MIS1; 12	MIS2; 13	DON1; 8	DON2; 7	JER1; 13	JER2; 10	11th	67	
