= Ornella Ongaro =

French motorcycle racer

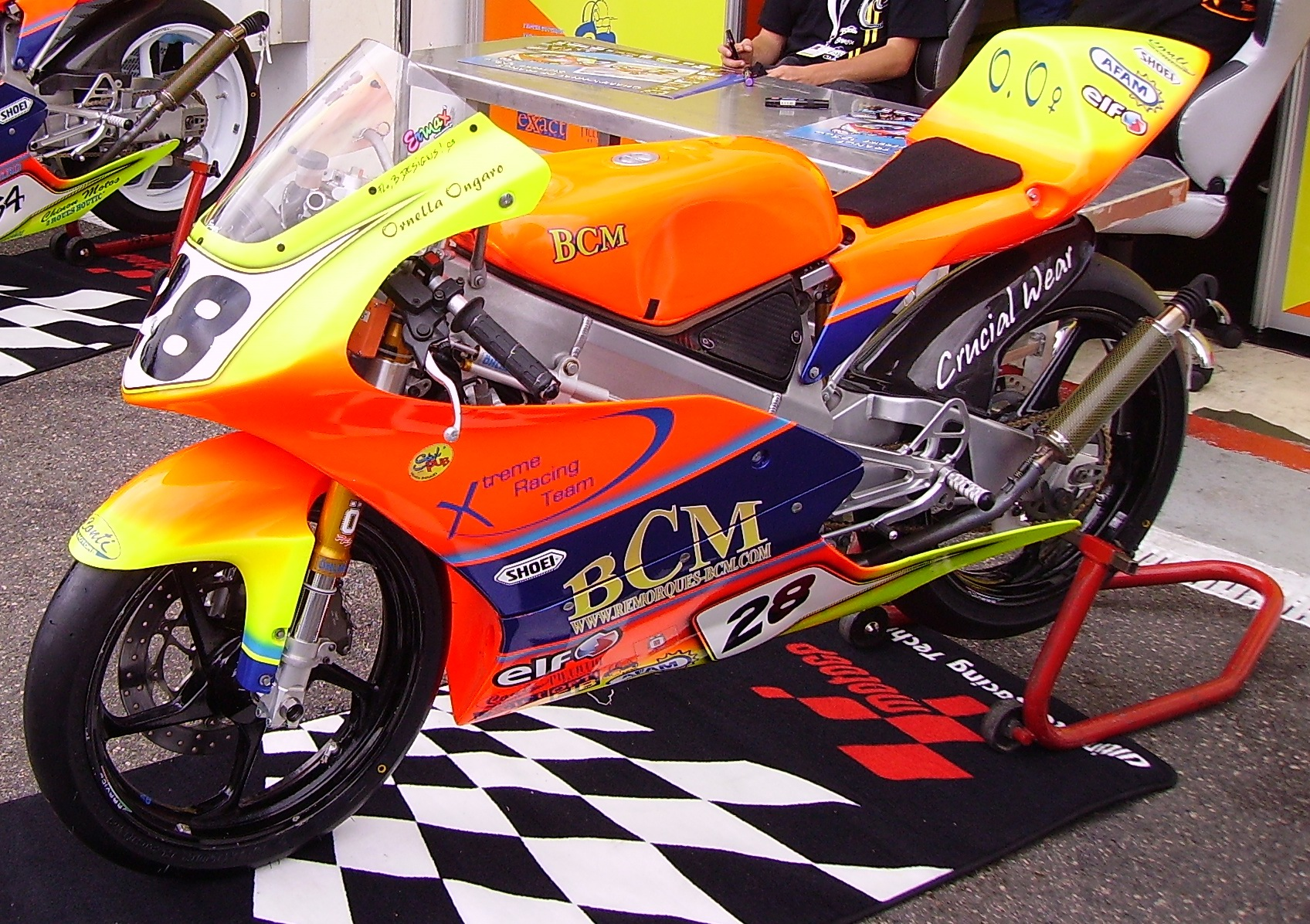
- A Honda RS125R ridden by Ongaro in 2009
- Nationality: French
- Born: 16 October 1990 (age 36); Cannes, France
- Current team: Yamaha Motoxracing WCR Team
- Bike number: 28
Motorcycle racing career statistics
Women's Circuit Racing World Championship
Active years	2024-
Manufacturers	Yamaha
2026 championship position	35th (0pts)
Starts / Wins / Podiums / Poles / F. laps / Points; 25 / 0 / 0 / 0 / 0 / 79

Ornella Ongaro (born 16 October 1990), known as "La Tulipe" because of her pink racing colours, is a French Grand Prix motorcycle racer. She took part in the FIM Women's Motorcycling World Championship in 2024 and 2025 and as a one-time rider in 2026.

== Awards ==
Ongaro has been on the podium over fifty times, and has had over forty victories during her career. She is the only French woman to have achieved both podiums and points at regional and national championships in mixed categories. In April 2016, she won the FFM Women's Cup.

== Career statistics ==
=== By season ===
Season	Class	Motorcycle	Team	Number	Race	Win	Podium	Pole	FLap	Pts	Plcd
2009	125cc	Honda	Xtrem Racing Team	49	0	0	0	0	0	0	NC
2024	WorldWCR	Yamaha YZF-R7	Yamaha Motoxracing WCR Team	28	12	0	0	0	0	55	10th
2025	WorldWCR	Yamaha YZF-R7	Prata Motor Sport	28	12	0	0	0	0	24	15th
2026	WorldWCR	Yamaha YZF-R7	Ongaro Racing Team	28	2	0	0	0	0	0	35th
Total					26	0	0	0	0	79	

==== Races by year ====
(key)

Year	Class	Bike	1	2	3	4	5	6	7	8	9	10	11	12	13	14	15	16	Pos.	Pts
2009	125cc	Honda	QAT	JPN	SPA	FRA; DNQ	ITA	CAT	NED	GER	GBR	CZE	IND	RSM	POR	AUS	MAL	VAL	NC	0
2024	WorldWCR	Yamaha YZF-R7	MIS1; Ret	MIS2; 7	DON1; 7	DON2; Ret	ARG1; 13	ARG2; 8	CRE1; 12	CRE2; 9	EST1; 14	EST2; 12	JER1; 12	JER2; 11					10th	55
2025	WorldWCR	Yamaha YZF-R7	ASS1; 13	ASS2; 12	CRE1; 18	CRE2; 15	DON1; 8	DON2; 8	BAL1; Ret	BAL2; DNS	MAG1; 20	MAG2; 18	JER1; 20	JER2; 18					15th	24
2026	WorldWCR	Yamaha YZF-R7	POR1	POR1	ASS1	ASS2	BAL1	BAL2	MIS1	MIS2	DON1; 21	DON2; 21	JER1	JER2					35th	0
