= Pakita Ruiz =

Spanish motorcycle racer

- Born: 18 August 1997 (age 29); Palma de Mallorca, Spain
- Current series: WorldWCR
- Current team: PR46+1 Racing Team
- Bike number: 46
- Website: pakitaruiz46.com

Championship titles
- 80cc Balearic Islands Championship (2011); Balearic Open 600 Championship (2015); ESBK Women's 600cc Championship (2015) (2016) (2017) (2018) (2019) (2020) (2022); Spanish Yamaha R6 Cup (2020)
Statistics
WorldWCR
Active years	2024-
Current team	PR46+1 Racing Team
Best season (2024)	6th (112 pts)
Last season (2026)	9th (73 pts)
Starts / Wins / Podiums / Poles / F. laps / Points; 36 / 0 / 0 / 0 / 0 / 286

Francisca 'Pakita' Ruiz Vidal (born 18 August 1997) is a Spanish motorcycle racer currently competing in the FIM Women's Circuit Racing World Championship (WorldWCR). She is a seven time champion in the Spanish ESBK Women's 600cc Championship.

== Biography ==
Ruiz was born on 18 August 1997 in Palma de Mallorca, Spain. Her love of motorcycles was inspired by her grandfather.

=== Racing career ===
Starting racing at only eight years old, Ruiz competed in minicross and supermoto, finishing second and third respectively in the Balearic Islands Championships.

In 2010. Ruiz decided to concentrate on road racing, competing in the open 80cc class of the Balearic Islands Championship, finishing the season third. The following year, she won the championship. She dedicated the win to Nofré Quijada, her friend who had been killed in a motorcycle accident a few months previously.

A lack of sponsorship for 2012 forced Ruiz to drop down to the 70cc scooter class, finishing the season in fourth position. She did receive partial sponsorship to compete in three rounds of the Cuna de Campeones Bankia in Catalonia where she achieved podium finishes. In 2013, she finished second in the Balearic Scooter Championship.

Without a sponsor for 2014, Ruiz produced a calendar featuring herself. Sale of the calendar enabled her to compete on a pit bike, finishing the season in seventh overall. At the end of 2014, Ruiz was on the verge of retiring due to lack of sponsorship when she saw an announcement for the first Spanish Women's Speed Cup, which was to take place in October 2015 at the Circuito de Navarra.

Ruiz produced a 2015 calendar to raise funds to compete in the Women's Speed Cup. She also found a local garage that would lend her a bike to compete in the Balearic Open 600 Championship in preparation for the Women's Speed Cup. She won the Balearic Championship. At the Women's Speed Cup, she obtained pole, set the fastest lap and won the first race. She was on pole for the second race and finished second. This was enough to be crowned the inaugural Spanish Women's Champion.

In March 2016, Ruiz signed with Champi Herreros to ride in his all-female project, Champi Women Racing, racing in the ESBK (Spanish Superbike Championship) Open 600 class and Women's Speed Cup. The Women's cup was run over three events at Jerez, Alcarràs and Navarra. Ruiz won the cup for the second year running. Due to clashes with the Women's Speed Cup, Ruiz missed two rounds of the Open 600 class and finished the season 17th.

In 2017, Ruiz continued to ride for Champi Women Racing and won the Spanish Women's Championship for the third time, winning four out of the five races in the series. Her fourth championship was won in 2018. Further Women's Championships followed in 2019, 2020 and 2022.

Ruiz won the inaugural Spanish Yamaha R6 Cup in 2020.

==== WorldWCR ====
In 2024, Ruiz was selected to compete in the inaugural FIM Women's Circuit Racing World Championship. Over forty riders had applied for inclusion in the 24 slot grid. She was one of the five Spanish riders selected. She finished the season 6th overall. Continuing in the series in 2025, she finished seventh.

=== '100 Emocions' Motorcycle School ===
In 2025, Ruiz started running a motorcycle school for youngsters in her native Mallorca in conjunction with the 100 Emocions Esport Club.

== Racing results ==
=== WorldWCR ===
(key) (Races in bold indicate pole position; races in italics indicate fastest lap)

Year	Bike	1	2	3	4	5	6	7	8	9	10	11	12	Pos	Pts	Refs
2024	Yamaha YZF-R7	MIS1; 10	MIS2; 9	DON1; 8	DON2; 8	ARG1; 5	ARG2; 6	CRE1; 6	CRE2; 6	EST1; 6	EST1; 6	JER1; 5	JER2; 5	6th	112	
2025	Yamaha YZF-R7	ASS1; 12	ASS2; 5	CRE1; 10	CRE2; 7	DON1; 6	DON2; 6	BAL1; 6	BAL2; 6	MAG1; 13	MAG2; 9	JER1; 8	JER2; 4	7th	101	
2026	Yamaha YZF-R7	POR1; 7	POR1; 5	ASS1; Ret	ASS2; 9	BAL1; 8	BAL2; 10	MIS1; 6	MIS2; 11	DON1; 9	DON2; 6	JER1; Ret	JER2; Ret	9th	73	

- Season still in progress
