= Paola Ramos (motorcyclist) =

Spanish motorcycle racer

- Born: 1 May 2007 (age 19); Tarragona, Catalonia, Spain
- Nickname: Superpao58
- Occupation: Motorcycle road racer
- Current series: WorldWCR
- Current team: Klint Forward Team
- Bike number: 58
- Website: paolaramos58.com
Statistics
WorldWCR
Active years	2025-
Last season (2026)	3rd (2 win/ 167 pts)
Starts / Wins / Podiums / Poles / F. laps / Points; 13 / 5 / 8 / 2 / 7 / 205

Paola Ramos Vivo (born 1 May 2007), known as Superpao58, is a Spanish motorcycle racer currently competing in the FIM Women's Circuit Racing World Championship. She races under the number 58 as a tribute to late Italian motorcycle racer Marco Simoncelli, which is the number he raced under.

== Biography ==
Ramos was born on 1 May 2007 in Tarragona, Catalonia, Spain. She became interested in motorcycles at an early age when she accompanied her father, uncles and grandfather to motorcycle racetrack practice sessions. For Christmas 2012, she asked the Three Kings (Note: In Spanish tradition presents are brought by the Three Kings rather than Father Christmas.) for a motorcycle. A minimoto was purchased and Ramos rode it on a local industrial estate.

=== Racing career ===
In 2013, Ramos started competing, finishing fifth in her class in the National Association of Amateur Pilots (ANPA) Championship although she had only competed in the second half of the season.

Ramos was the runner-up in the 2019 Spanish Moto5 Inter-Regional Championship. Before the start of the 2020 season Ramos announced that she was unable to continue racing as she couldn't find a sponsor to cover the cost of competing.

Ramos returned to racing in 2024 with the Superhugo44 team, competing in the Superstock 600 category of the ESBK (Spanish Superbike Championship). The following year, she competed in the Spanish Yamaha R7 Cup with the YVS Sabadell team, finishing third in the standings.

==== WorldWCR ====
In October 2025, Ramos was entered as a wildcard in the final round of the WorldWCR at Jerez. She won the first race but was demoted to fourth after receiving a penalty for making contact with Beatriz Neila. Ramos won the second race by nearly ten seconds.

Ramos got a full-time ride with the Klint Forward Team for the 2026 WorldWCR season alongside Roberta Ponziani.

== Career statistics ==
=== Women's Circuit Racing World Championship ===
(key) (Races in bold indicate pole position; races in italics indicate fastest lap)

Year	Bike	1	2	3	4	5	6	7	8	9	10	11	12	Pos	Pts
2025	Yamaha YZF-R7	ASS1	ASS2	CRE1	CRE2	DON1	DON2	BAL1	BAL2	MAG1	MAG2	JER1; 4	**JER2**; 1	13th	38
2026	Yamaha YZF-R7	ALG1; 2	ALG2; 1	ASS1; Ret	ASS2; DNS	BAL1; 3	**BAL2**; 1	**MIS1**; Ret	MIS2; 5	DON1; 2	DON2; Ret	**JER1**; 1	JER2; 1	3rd	167
