= Natalia Rivera =

Spanish motorcycle racer

- Born: 21 December 2006 (age 19); Madrid, Spain
- Occupation: Motorcycle racer
- Current series: WorldWCR
- Current team: Terra & Vita GRT Yamaha
- Bike number: 20

Championship titles
- 2024 FIM Women's European Championship
Statistics
WorldWCR
Active years	2025 -
Current team	Terra & Vita GRT Yamaha
Best season (2026)	8th (84 pts)
Starts / Wins / Podiums / Poles / F. laps / Points; 24 / 0 / 0 / 0 / 0 / 138
Women's European Championship
Active years	2023-2024
Championships	1 (2024)
Last season (2024)	1st (4 wins/170 pts)
Starts / Wins / Podiums / Poles / F. laps / Points; 18 / 5 / 13 / 5 / 8 / 338

Natalia Rivera Resel (born 21 November 2006) is a Spanish motorcycle road racer who currently competes in the FIM Women's Circuit Racing World Championship. She is the 2024 Women's European Champion.

== Biography ==
Rivera was born on 21 November 2006 in Madrid, Spain.

Rivera competed in various Spanish national competitions, including being runner up in the Spanish Moto5 Cup in 2019.

In 2022, Rivera took part in the FIM Yamaha bLU cRU World Cup, obtaining some podiums. She also competed in the inaugural Yamaha R3 bLU cRU European SuperFinale at the Algarve Circuit in Portugal. She finish eighth in the first race and ninth in the second. At the following year's SuperFinale, Rivera finish second in the first race but fell in the second race on lap 4.

Rivera competed in the 2023 FIM Women's European Championship, finishing the season as runner up. She had a dominant season in 2024, winning four races to win the championship. She also made four wildcard appearances in the Yamaha R3 BLU CRU World Cup in 2024.

Rivera joined the grid of the WorldWCR in 2025, racing for the Terra&Vita GRT Yamaha Team. She finished the season 11th overall.

In 2025, Rivera was one of ten young riders chosen to attend the Yamaha BLU CRU Master Camp, a five day event where participants can learn from some of the industry's best coaches.

Rivera continued with Terra&Vita GRT Yamaha Team in the 2026 WorldWCR.

== Racing results ==
=== Women's European Championship ===
(key)

Year	Bike	1	2	3	4	5	6	7	8	9	10	Pos.	Pts.	Refs
2023	Yamaha YZF-R3	MIS1; 4	MIS2; 4	VAL1; 2	VAL2; 5	MOS1; 2	MOS2; 2	BRN1; 10	BRN2; 1	MUG; 2	IMO; 3	2nd	168	
2024	Yamaha YZF-R3	MIS; 1	CRE; 1	BRN1; 1	BRN2; 7	GRO1; 2	GRO2; 3	IMO; 1	IMO; 2			1st	170	

=== WorldWCR ===
(key) (Races in bold indicate pole position; races in italics indicate fastest lap)

Year	1	2	3	4	5	6	7	8	9	10	11	12	Pos.	Pts.
2025	ASS1; DSQ	ASS2; 15	CRE1; 14	CRE2; 18	DON; 11	DON; 9	BAL1; 13	BAL2; 13	MAG1; 6	MAG2; 6	JER; 10	JER; 10	11th	54
2026	POR1; 8	POR2; 7	ASS1; 6	ASS2; 11	BAL1; 7	BAL2; 8	MIS1; 11	MIS2; 8	DON1; 14	DON2; 17	JER1; 4	JER2; 9	10th	67
