= Beatriz Neila =

Spanish motorcycle racer

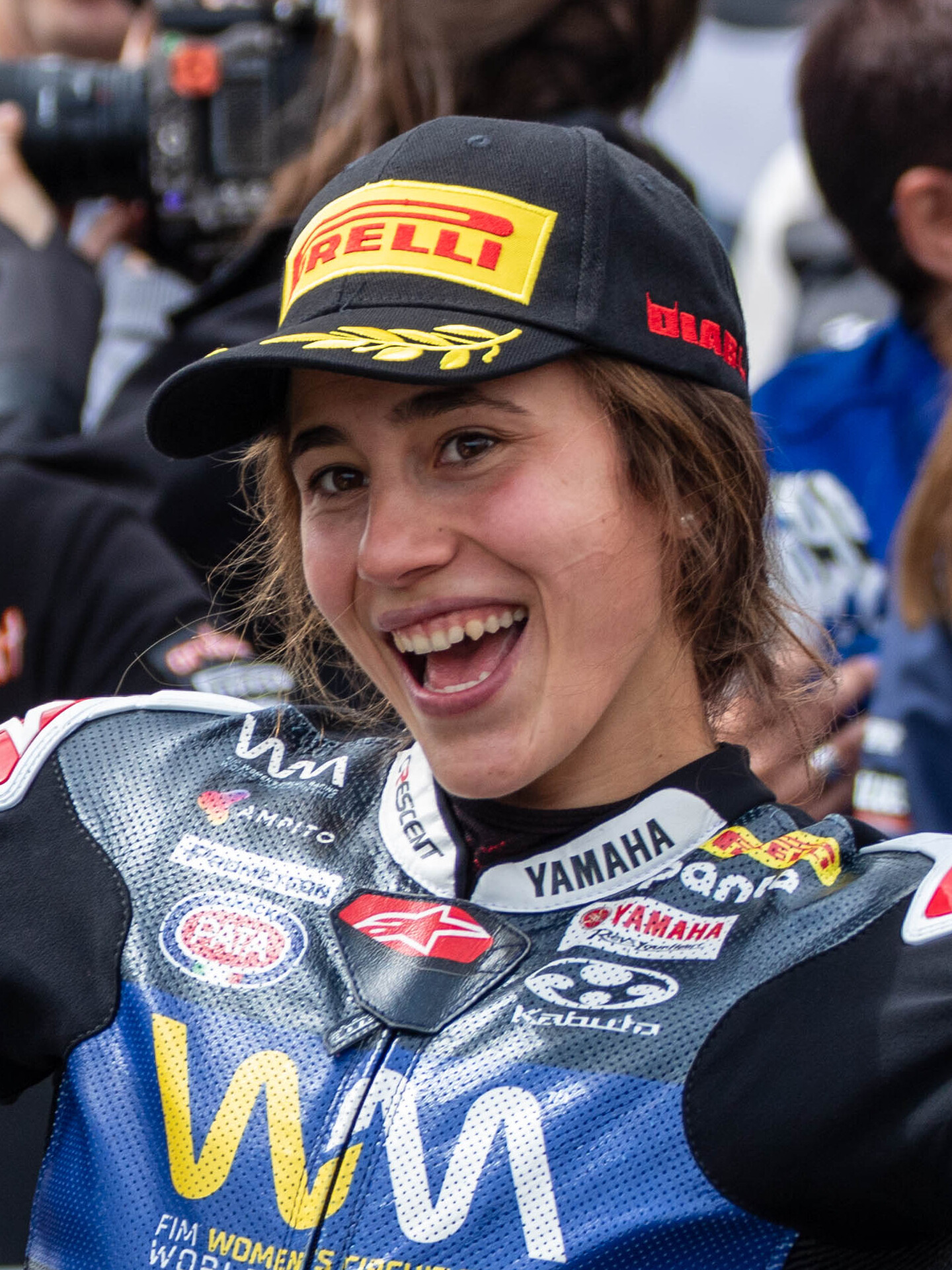
- Neila, Donington World WCR 2024
- Born: 15 April 2002 (age 24); Arganda del Rey, Community of Madrid, Spain
- Current team: Ampito/Pata Prometeon Yamaha
- Bike number: 36
Motorcycle racing career statistics
Supersport 300 World Championship
Active years	2018-9, 2022
Manufacturers	Yamaha
2022 championship position	NC
Starts / Wins / Podiums / Poles / F. laps / Points; 9 / 0 / 0 / 0 / 0 / 11
Women's Circuit Racing World Championship
Active years	2024-
Manufacturers	Yamaha
2026 championship position	2nd (2 wins/ 222 pts)
Starts / Wins / Podiums / Poles / F. laps / Points; 26 / 6 / 27 / 2 / 9 / 634

Beatriz Neila Santos (born 15 April 2002) is a Spanish motorcycle racer currently competing in the FIM Women's Motorcycling World Championship. She won the Women's European Cup in 2020, 2021 and 2022. The series was raised to Championship status in 2023, which Neila won. Neila is also an ambassador for her birthplace Arganda del Rey, the European City of Sport 2024, and for the FIM Women's Motorcycling World Championship.

== Career ==
Neila's first experience of motorcycles was when she was eight and her father had brought her younger brother a minibike for his fifth birthday which Neila was allowed to ride. She soon had her own machine.

Neila's competitive career started in 2011 when she competed in races in the Madrid area in the minimoto class. The next year, she moved up to the MiniGP 110 class, competing in two rounds of the Cuna de Campeones. In 2013, Neila came tenth in the Cuna de Campeones MiniGP 140 class. Riding an 80cc machine, she came eighth in the class of the Copa España Velocidad (CEV) Challenge in 2014. Moving up to a Honda CBR250 for 2015, she came third in both the Femines Championship Catalan Velocidad and the Femines Championship Mediterraneo Velocidad. The following year, she won both of these championships on a Honda CBR300.

In 2017, Neila was selected to compete in the Red Bull MotoGP Rookies Cup. She also signed with Team Stratos to compete in the FIM CEV European Talent Cup. During pre-season testing for the Red Bull Rookies Cup at MotorLand Aragón in April, Neila had a serious accident breaking her right femur, left wrist and nose. Initially, it was thought her injuries would prevent her riding for four or five months, but she was back competing in late June.

Returning to Spain in 2018, Neila competed in the National Yamaha R3 bLU cRU Challenge for BCD Yamaha MS Racing. MS Racing also entered her as a wildcard rider in the Aragón round of the Supersport 300 World Championship. Finishing second in the R3 bLU cRU Challenge earned her a place in the 2019 Supersport 300 World Championship with MS Racing as part of the Yamaha Motor Europe's Yamaha R3 bLU cRU Challenge.

In 2019, Neila attended the Yamaha VR46 Master Camp at Valentino Rossi's Motor Ranch, the first female to do so. Neila was also invited to compete in the 2019 100km dei Campioni at Rossi’s Motor Ranch.

Lack of funding prevented her from competing in the 2020 Supersport 300 World Championship, competing in the inaugural Women's European Cup instead. Neila won the cup, winning four of the five rounds. She dominated the series again in 2021 and 2022. In 2023, the series was upgraded to the Women's European Championship and was won yet again by Neila.

The Pata Prometeon Yamaha WorldSBK Official Team announced Neila as their entry for the 2024 FIM Women's Motorcycling World Championship, with sponsorship from the Ampito Group.

== Racing record ==
=== Career summary ===
Season	Series	Team	Motorcycle	Races	Wins	Poles	F/Laps	Podiums	Points	Position	Ref
2017	Red Bull Rookies Cup		KTM	11	0	0	0	0	0	25th	
2017	European Talent Cup	Team Stratos	Honda NSF250R	9	0	0	0	0	12	21st	
2018	Spanish Supersport 300 Championship									4th	
2018	Yamaha bLU cRU challenge	BCD Yamaha MS Racing	Yamaha YZF-R3	8	1			6	151	**2nd**	
2018	Supersport 300 World Championship	BCD Yamaha MS Racing	Yamaha YZF-R3	1	0	0	0	0	0	NC	
2019	Supersport 300 World Championship	BCD Yamaha MS Racing	Yamaha YZF-R3	7	0	0	0	0	12	21st	
2020	Women’s European Cup		Yamaha YZF-R3	5	4		3	5	116	**1st**	
2021	Women’s European Cup		Yamaha YZF-R3	7	3	2	5	7	158	**1st**	
2021	Supersport 300 World Championship	Team Trasimeno	Yamaha YZF-R3	1	0	0	0	0	0	NC	
2022	Women’s European Cup		Yamaha YZF-R3	9	4	4	4	8	201	**1st**	
2023	Women’s European Championship		Kawasaki Ninja 400 / Yamaha YZF-R3	10	6	3	5	10	238	**1st**	
2024	WorldWCR	Ampito/Pata Prometeon Yamaha	Yamaha YZF-R7	12	0	1	2	4	172	4th	
2025	WorldWCR	Ampito/Pata Prometeon Yamaha	Yamaha YZF-R7	2	1	1	1	2	45	**2nd**	
2025	JuniorGP	AGR Team	KTM RC250GP	0	0	0	0	0	0	NC	
2026	2026	Ampito Crescent Yamaha/Monster Energy Crescent Yamaha	Yamaha YZF-R7	12	2	1	3	10	222	**2nd**	

=== Supersport 300 World Championship Results ===
(key) (Races in bold indicate pole position) (Races in italics indicate fastest lap)

Year	Team	Motorcycle	1	2	3	4	5	6	7	8	9	10	11	12	13	14	15	16	Pos.	Pts.	Ref
2018	BCD Yamaha MS Racing	Yamaha YZF-R3	ARA; 22	ASS	IMO	DON	BRN	MIS	POR	MAG									NC	0	
2019	BCD Yamaha MS Racing	Yamaha YZF-R3	ARA; 20	ASS; DNQ	IMO; C	JER1; 20	JER2; 13	MIS; DNQ	DON; 17	POR; 7	MAG; 28	LOS; 16							21st	12	
2021	BCD Yamaha MS Racing	Yamaha YZF-R3	ARA1; 20	ARA2; DNS	MIS1	MIS2	ASS1	ASS2	MOS1	MOS2	MAG1	MAG2	BAR1	BAR2	JER1	JER2	POR1	POR2	NC	0	

=== WorldWCR results ===
(key) (Races in bold indicate pole position) (Races in italics indicate fastest lap)

Year	Team	Motorcycle	1	2	3	4	5	6	7	8	9	10	11	12	Pos.	Pts.
2024	Ampito/Pata Prometeon Yamaha	Yamaha YZF-R7	MIS1; 5	MIS2; 4	DON1; 2	DON2; **4**	ALG1; 4	ALG2; 4	CRE1; 5	CRE2; 4	EST1; 3	EST2; 4	JER1; 3	JER2; 2	4th	172
2025	Ampito/Pata Prometeon Yamaha	Yamaha YZF-R7	ASS1; 2	ASS2; 1	CRE1; 3	CRE2; 3	**DON1**; 2	DON2; 1	BAL1; 3	BAL2; 1	MAG1; 3	MAG2; 1	JER1; 3	JER2; 2	2nd	240
2026	Ampito Crescent Yamaha/Monster Energy Crescent Yamaha	Yamaha YZF-R7	ALG1; 3	ALG2; 3	ASS1; 2	**ASS2**; 1	BAL1; 2	BAL2; 2	MIS1; 2	MIS2; 2	DON1; Ret	DON2; 1	JER1; 2	JER2; 2	2nd	222

=== FIM JuniorGP World Championship ===
==== Races by year ====
(key) (Races in bold indicate pole position; races in italics indicate fastest lap)

Year	Bike	1	2	3	4	5	6	7	8	9	10	11	12	Pos	Pts
2025	KTM	EST	JER	JER	MAG	ARA	ARA	MIS	MIS	CAT; DNQ	CAT; DNQ	VAL; DNQ	VAL; DNQ	NC	0
