= 2026 FIM Women's Circuit Racing World Championship =

Racing competition

2026 FIM Women's Circuit Racing World Championship
Previous:	2025	Next:	2027
Support series: Superbike World Championship; Supersport World Championship; Sportbike World Championship; Yamaha R3 bLU cRU FIM World Cup

The 2026 FIM Women's Circuit Racing World Championship was the third season of the FIM Women's Circuit Racing World Championship (WorldWCR), the premier female only circuit racing series. Riders compete on identical Yamaha YZF-R7 motorcycles. The rounds were run as support races for 6 of the European rounds of the Superbike World Championship. Format of each round was a Superpole qualifying session on Friday, Race 1 on Saturday and Race 2 on Sunday.

2025 champion Maria Herrera successfully defended her championship in the final round at Jerez.

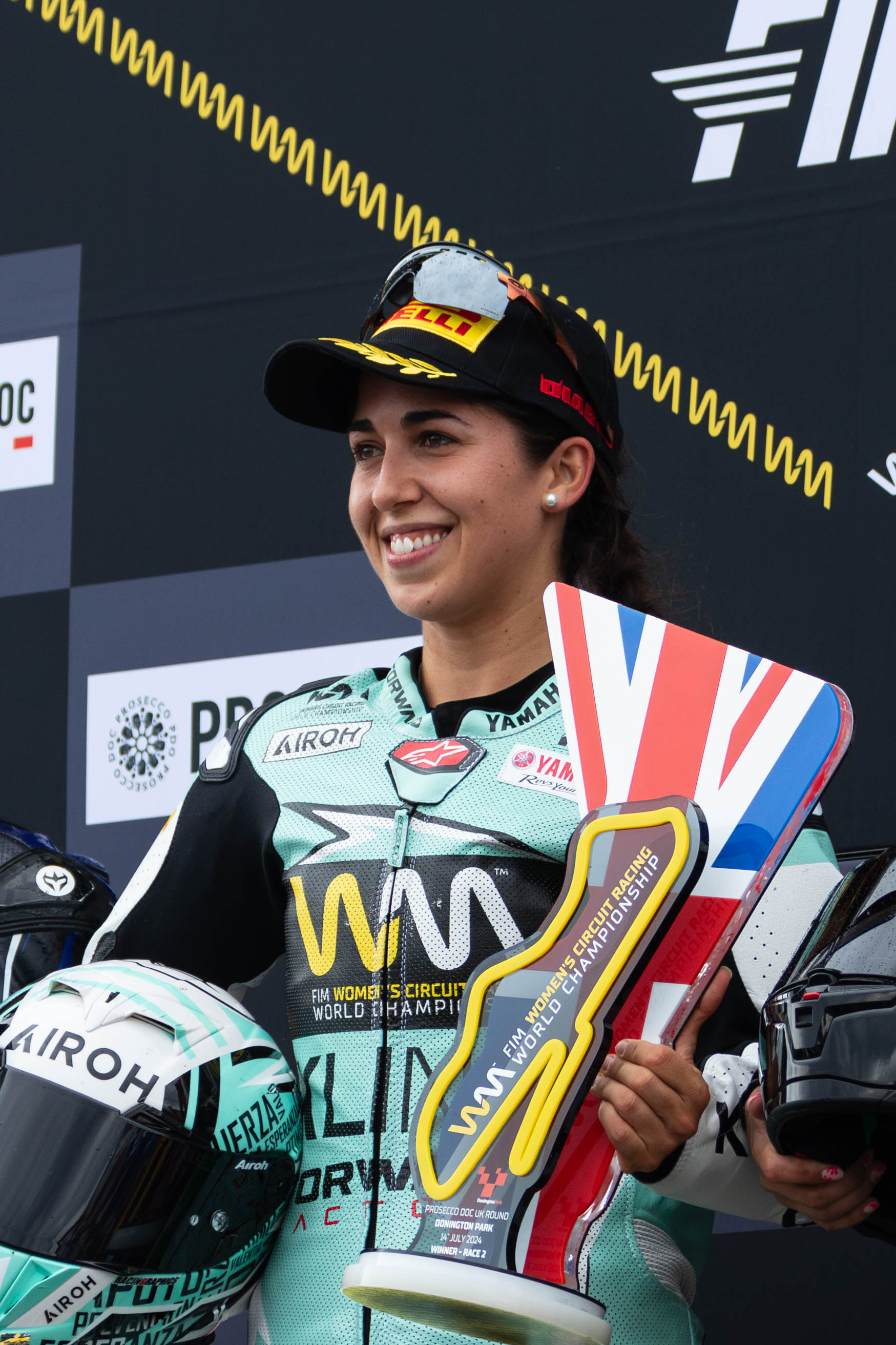
Maria Herrera, (pictured in 2024), the 2026 FIM Women's Circuit Racing World Champion.

== Teams and riders ==
The FIM published the provisional entry list on 15 December 2025.

Provisional 2026 entry list
Team	Constructor	Motorcycle	No.	Rider	Rounds
(United Kingdom) / Monster Energy Crescent Yamaha (Note: Bike No. 15 entered as Monster Energy Crescent Yamaha and bike No. 36 entered as Ampito Crescent Yamaha.); (United Kingdom) / Ampito Crescent Yamaha	Yamaha	YZF-R7	15	(United Kingdom) Chloe Jones	All
(United Kingdom) / Monster Energy Crescent Yamaha; (United Kingdom) / Ampito Crescent Yamaha	Yamaha	YZF-R7	36	(Spain) Beatriz Neila	All
(United Kingdom) Carl Cox Motor Sports	Yamaha	YZF-R7	21	(New Zealand) Avalon Lewis	6
(Czech Republic) DafitMotoracing	Yamaha	YZF-R7	19	(Czech Republic) Adéla Ouředníčková	All
(Thailand) EEST NJT Racing Team	Yamaha	YZF-R7	12	(Thailand) Muklada Sarapuech	All
(France) FT Racing Academy	Yamaha	YZF-R7	4	(France) Emily Bondi	All
(France) FT Racing Academy	Yamaha	YZF-R7	37	(France) Line Vieillard	All
(Australia) Full Throttle Racing	Yamaha	YZF-R7	8	(Australia) Tayla Relph	All
(France) GMT94-Yamaha	Yamaha	YZF-R7	94	(France) Lucie Boudesseul	1–3
(France) GMT94-Yamaha	Yamaha	YZF-R7	25	(France) Justine Pedemonte	4–5
(France) GMT94-Yamaha	Yamaha	YZF-R7	76	(France) Carla Mulot	6
(Spain) Hadden Racing Team	Yamaha	YZF-R7	41	(Italy) Arianna Barale	All
(Spain) Hadden Racing Team	Yamaha	YZF-R7	64	(Spain) Sara Sánchez	1–2, 4–6
(Italy) Klint Racing Team	Yamaha	YZF-R7	58	(Spain) Paola Ramos	All
(Italy) Klint Racing Team	Yamaha	YZF-R7	96	(Italy) Roberta Ponziani	All
(Germany) Motorradtechnik Geenen by Yamaha	Yamaha	YZF-R7	61	(Netherlands) Birgit Scheffer	2
(Spain) MotosCerpa	Yamaha	YZF-R7	11	(Spain) Yvonne Cerpa	All
(Italy) Pata AG Motorsport Italia	Yamaha	YZF-R7	88	(Italy) Denise Dal Zotto	All
(Mexico) Pons Italika Racing FIMLA	Yamaha	YZF-R7	83	(Mexico) Astrid Madrigal	All
(Mexico) Pons Italika Racing FIMLA	Yamaha	YZF-R7	99	(Chile) Isis Carreño	1–5
(Mexico) Pons Italika Racing FIMLA	Yamaha	YZF-R7	18	(Dominican Republic) Krystal Silfa	6
(Spain) PR46+1 Racing Team	Yamaha	YZF-R7	46	(Spain) Pakita Ruiz	All
(Italy) Prata Motor Sport	Yamaha	YZF-R7	22	(Italy) Martina Guarino	1–3
(Italy) Prata Motor Sport	Yamaha	YZF-R7	66	(Poland) Karolina Danak	4
(Italy) Prata Motor Sport	Yamaha	YZF-R7	28	(France) Ornella Ongaro	5
(Italy) Prata Motor Sport	Yamaha	YZF-R7	13	(Italy) Luana Giuliani	6
(Italy) Terra & Vita GRT Yamaha WorldWCR Team	Yamaha	YZF-R7	6	(Spain) María Herrera	All
(Italy) Terra & Vita GRT Yamaha WorldWCR Team	Yamaha	YZF-R7	20	(Spain) Natalia Rivera	All
(Italy) Team Trasimeno	Yamaha	YZF-R7	26	(United Kingdom) Katie Hand	All
(Italy) Team Trasimeno	Yamaha	YZF-R7	44	(Poland) Patrycja Sowa	1–4, 6
(Italy) Team Trasimeno	Yamaha	YZF-R7	93	(France) Julie Ritaine	5
(Italy) Team Trasimeno	Yamaha	YZF-R7	80	(Italy) Josephine Bruno	4
(Germany) TSL-Racing	Yamaha	YZF-R7	16	(Germany) Lucy Michel	All
(Spain) YVS Sabadell Diva Racing	Yamaha	YZF-R7	14	(United States) Mallory Dobbs	All
(Italy) Yamaha AD78 FIMLA	Yamaha	YZF-R7	66	(Poland) Karolina Danak	1–3
(Italy) Yamaha AD78 FIMLA	Yamaha	YZF-R7	17	(Brazil) Gabrielly Lewis	4
(Italy) Yamaha AD78 FIMLA	Yamaha	YZF-R7	5	(Colombia) Sarah Varon	6

Key
Regular rider
Wildcard rider
Replacement rider

=== Team and rider changes ===
- Defending champion María Herrera left Klint Racing Team to join Terra & Vita GRT Yamaha WorldWCR Team.
- Sara Sánchez left the Terra & Vita GRT Yamaha WorldWCR Team and joined Hadden Racing Team.
- Chloe Jones, who rode with GR Motosport in 2025, joins Monster Energy Crescent Yamaha.
- Mallory Dobbs changed from MKD Racing Team to YVS Sabadell Diva Racing.
- Emily Bondi changed from Zelos Trasimeno to FT Racing Academy
- Denise Dal Zotto who rode as a wildcard for Affinity Sports Academy Rokit Rookies team at Cremona and Donington in 2025, becomes a full time rider for Pata AG Motorsport Italia.
- Paola Ramos, who claimed victory at Jerez in 2025 as a wildcard, joined Klint Racing Team as a full time rider.
- Line Vieillard, who competed for FT Racing Academy as a wildcard at Magny-Cours in 2025, has been entered by the team for a full time ride,
- Katie Hand, who competed at Magny-Cours in 2025 for Carl Cox Motorsports, joined Team Trasimeno as a full time rider.
- Yvonne Cerpa (MotoCerpa), Martina Guarino (Prata Motor Sport), Arianna Barale (Hadden Racing Team), Patrycja Sowa (Team Trasimeno) and Karolina Danak (Yamaha AD78 FIMLA) joined the grid. Cerpa was not in the initial entry list, but joined later on after Avalon Lewis put her plans to compete on hold due to sustaining an injury during pre-season training.
- Billee Fuller, Madalena Simões, Jamie Hanks-Elliott, Ornella Ongaro, Beatrice Barbera, Sonya Lloyd, Jessica Howden and Chun Mei Liu, who all raced in 2025, will not compete as full time riders in 2026.
- Affinity Sports Academy ROKiT Rookies, FB Racing Team, GR Motosport, Hanks Racing, MKD Racing Team, Ongaro Racing Team, WT Team Taiwan and Zelos Trasimeno teams are not entering full time riders.
- Hadden Racing Team, MotoCerpa, Pata AG Motorsport Italia and Prata Motor Sport are entering riders for the first time in 2025. Yamaha AD78 FIMLA who entered a rider in 2024 return in 2026.

=== Wildcards / Replacements ===
- The EEST NJT Racing Team contacted Muklada Sarapuech in January 2026 with an offer to race for them in WorldWCR. However the entry list for 2026 was already closed. Organisers Dorna were keen to have an Asian rider in the series so allowed her to ride as a wildcard, with that designation later converted to full-time by round 5.
- Dutch racer Birgit Scheffer was entered in the second round at Assen by Motorradtechnik Geenen by Yamaha.
- Team Trasimeno entered Italian racer Josephine Bruno as a wildcard at Misano.
- Prata Motor Sport replaced Martina Guarino with Karolina Danak at Misano, Ornella Ongaro, who had raced in WorldWCR in 2024 and 2025, at Donington Park, and Italian newcomer Luana Giuliani at Jerez.
- Yamaha AD78 FIMLA replaced Karolina Danak with Brazilian racer Gabrielly Lewis at Misano, and Sarah Varon, who had raced in WorldWCR full-time in 2024 and as a wildcard in 2025, as a wildcard at Jerez.
- After a crash in the French Superbike championship Lucie Boudesseul was forced to miss the rest of the season with an injury, and was replaced by French rider Justine Pedemonte, who had previously raced as a wildcard at Magny-Cours in the 2025 season, at Misano and Donington Park, and French newcomer Carla Mulot at Jerez.
- Team Trasimeno entered French racer Julie Ritaine as a replacement for Patrycja Sowa at Donington Park, as Sowa decided to compete in the Alpe Adria International Motorcycle Championship in Brno instead.
- Krystal Silfa, who had raced for Italika in 2025, replaced Isis Carreño at Pons Italika Racing FIMLA for Jerez.
- Avalon Lewis, who was originally going to compete full-time, was entered as a wildcard in Jerez.

== Calendar ==
Location of races in 2026.

On 18 September 2025 the provisional 2026 WorldWCR calendar was published. The scheduled rounds were:

Circuit	Date
(Portugal) Algarve International Circuit	27–29 March
(Netherlands) TT Circuit Assen	17–19 April
(Hungary) Balaton Park Circuit	1-3 May
(Emilia-Romagna) Misano World Circuit	12–14 June
(United Kingdom) Donington Park	10–12 July
(Spain) Circuito de Jerez	16–18 October

An official test day was held for 23 March 2026 at the Algarve International Circuit, in which defending champion Herrera was fastest.

== Race results ==
2026 calendar and results
Round			Circuit	Pole position (Note: Pole for Race 1 set by Superpole, pole for Race 2 set by fastest lap in Race 1.)	Fastest lap	Winning rider	Winning team	Ref
1	R1	(Portugal) Portuguese Round	Algarve International Circuit	(Spain) María Herrera	(Spain) María Herrera	(Spain) María Herrera	(Italy) Terra & Vita GRT Yamaha WorldWCR Team	
1	R2	(Portugal) Portuguese Round	Algarve International Circuit		(Spain) Beatriz Neila	(Spain) Paola Ramos	(Italy) Klint Racing Team	
2	R1	(Netherlands) Dutch Round	TT Circuit Assen	(Spain) María Herrera	(Spain) Beatriz Neila	(Spain) María Herrera	(Italy) Terra & Vita GRT Yamaha WorldWCR Team	
2	R2	(Netherlands) Dutch Round	TT Circuit Assen		(Spain) Beatriz Neila	(Spain) Beatriz Neila	(United Kingdom) Ampito Crescent Yamaha	
3	R1	(Hungary) Hungarian Round	Balaton Park Circuit	(Spain) María Herrera	(Spain) Paola Ramos	(Spain) María Herrera	(Italy) Terra & Vita GRT Yamaha WorldWCR Team	
3	R2	(Hungary) Hungarian Round	Balaton Park Circuit		(Spain) Paola Ramos	(Spain) Paola Ramos	(Italy) Klint Racing Team	
4	R1	Emilia-Romagna Round	Misano World Circuit	(Spain) Paola Ramos	(Italy) Roberta Ponziani	(Spain) María Herrera	(Italy) Terra & Vita GRT Yamaha WorldWCR Team	
4	R2	Emilia-Romagna Round	Misano World Circuit		(Spain) María Herrera	(Spain) María Herrera	(Italy) Terra & Vita GRT Yamaha WorldWCR Team	
5	R1	(United Kingdom) UK Round	Donington Park	(Spain) María Herrera	(Spain) María Herrera	(Spain) María Herrera	(Italy) Terra & Vita GRT Yamaha WorldWCR Team	
5	R2	(United Kingdom) UK Round	Donington Park		(Spain) Paola Ramos	(Spain) Beatriz Neila (Note: María Herrera was the first rider to cross the finish line, but received a 6-second time penalty for irresponsible riding. Beatriz Neila, who was the second rider to cross the finish line, thus inherited the win.)	(United Kingdom) Ampito Crescent Yamaha	
6	R1	(Spain) Spanish Round	Circuito de Jerez	(Spain) Paola Ramos	(Spain) Paola Ramos	(Spain) Paola Ramos	(Italy) Klint Racing Team	
6	R2	(Spain) Spanish Round	Circuito de Jerez		(Spain) Paola Ramos	(Spain) Paola Ramos	(Italy) Klint Racing Team	

== Championship standings ==
=== Scoring system ===
Points system
Position	1	2	3	4	5	6	7	8	9	10	11	12	13	14	15
Points	25	20	16	13	11	10	9	8	7	6	5	4	3	2	1

=== Riders' championship ===
Pos	Rider	POR (Portugal)		ASS (Netherlands)		BAL (Hungary)		MIS (Emilia-Romagna)		DON (United Kingdom)		JER (Spain)		Pts
Pos	Rider	R1	R2	R1	R2	R1	R2	R1	R2	R1	R2	R1	R2	Pts
1	(Spain) María Herrera	1	2	1	2	1	3	1	1	1	2	5	4	250
2	(Spain) Beatriz Neila	3	3	2	1	2	2	2	2	Ret	1	2	2	222
3	(Spain) Paola Ramos	2	1	Ret	DNS	3	1	Ret	5	2	Ret	1	1	167
4	(Italy) Roberta Ponziani	6	4	3	4	4	5	Ret	4	4	3	3	5	143
5	(United Kingdom) Chloe Jones	13	14	4	6	6	9	3	10	6	4	7	3	115
6	(Thailand) Muklada Sarapuech	11	10	5	5	5	4	7	3	3	Ret	9	7	115
7	(Spain) Yvonne Cerpa	9	6	17	7	14	12	4	6	7	8	6	6	92
8	(Spain) Natalia Rivera	8	7	6	11	7	8	11	8	14	17	4	9	84
9	(Spain) Pakita Ruiz	7	5	Ret	9	8	10	6	11	9	6	Ret	Ret	73
10	(Spain) Sara Sánchez	5	9	Ret	13			8	7	5	5	8	Ret	67
11	(Mexico) Astrid Madrigal	18	11	7	12	10	6	12	13	8	7	13	10	67
12	(Australia) Tayla Relph	10	8	Ret	8	11	11	9	Ret	Ret	9	11	8	59
13	(France) Lucie Boudesseul	4	Ret	Ret	3	9	7							45
14	(Poland) Karolina Danak	14	12	8	24	12	Ret	5	Ret					29
15	(France) Emily Bondi	Ret	16	19	15	Ret	14	10	Ret	10	19	10	11	26
16	(Chile) Isis Carreño	19	Ret	10	18	13	13	13	14	12	16			21
17	(France) Line Vieillard	12	13	Ret	17	18	15	Ret	15	13	11	12	DSQ	21
18	(France) Justine Pedemonte							Ret	12	11	10			15
19	(Germany) Lucy Michel	21	19	13	25	16	18	18	18	18	12	15	12	12
20	(Italy) Arianna Barale	20	21	9	19	21	20	16	22	15	13	20	16	11
21	(Italy) Denise Dal Zotto	16	15	11	14	15	17	17	19	16	15	19	18	10
22	(Italy) Josephine Bruno							Ret	9					7
23	(United States) Mallory Dobbs	23	17	Ret	10	17	21	Ret	20	20	Ret	22	20	6
24	(Poland) Patrycja Sowa	22	22	12	21	22	22	14	17			23	19	6
25	(United Kingdom) Katie Hand	Ret	18	14	23	20	19	19	21	17	14	24	21	4
26	(Colombia) Sara Varon											14	14	4
27	(France) Carla Mulot											17	13	3
28	(Czech Republic) Adéla Ouředníčková	15	Ret	15	20	Ret	16	15	16	19	18	21	Ret	3
29	(Italy) Luana Giuliani											18	15	1
30	(Italy) Martina Guarino	17	20	16	16	19	Ret							0
31	(New Zealand) Avalon Lewis											16	17	0
32	(Netherlands) Birgit Scheffer			18	22									0
33	(France) Julie Ritaine									22	20			0
34	(Brazil) Gabrielly Lewis							20	23					0
35	(France) Ornella Ongaro									21	21			0
36	(Dominican Republic) Krystal Silfa											25	DSQ	0
Pos	Rider	POR (Portugal)		ASS (Netherlands)		BAL (Hungary)		MIS (Emilia-Romagna)		DON (United Kingdom)		JER (Spain)		Pts
