= 2025 FIM Women's Circuit Racing World Championship =

Racing competition

2025 FIM Women's Circuit Racing World Championship
Champion: Maria Herrera
Previous:	2024	Next:	2026
Support series: Superbike World Championship; Supersport World Championship; Supersport 300 World Championship; Yamaha R3 bLU cRU FIM World Cup

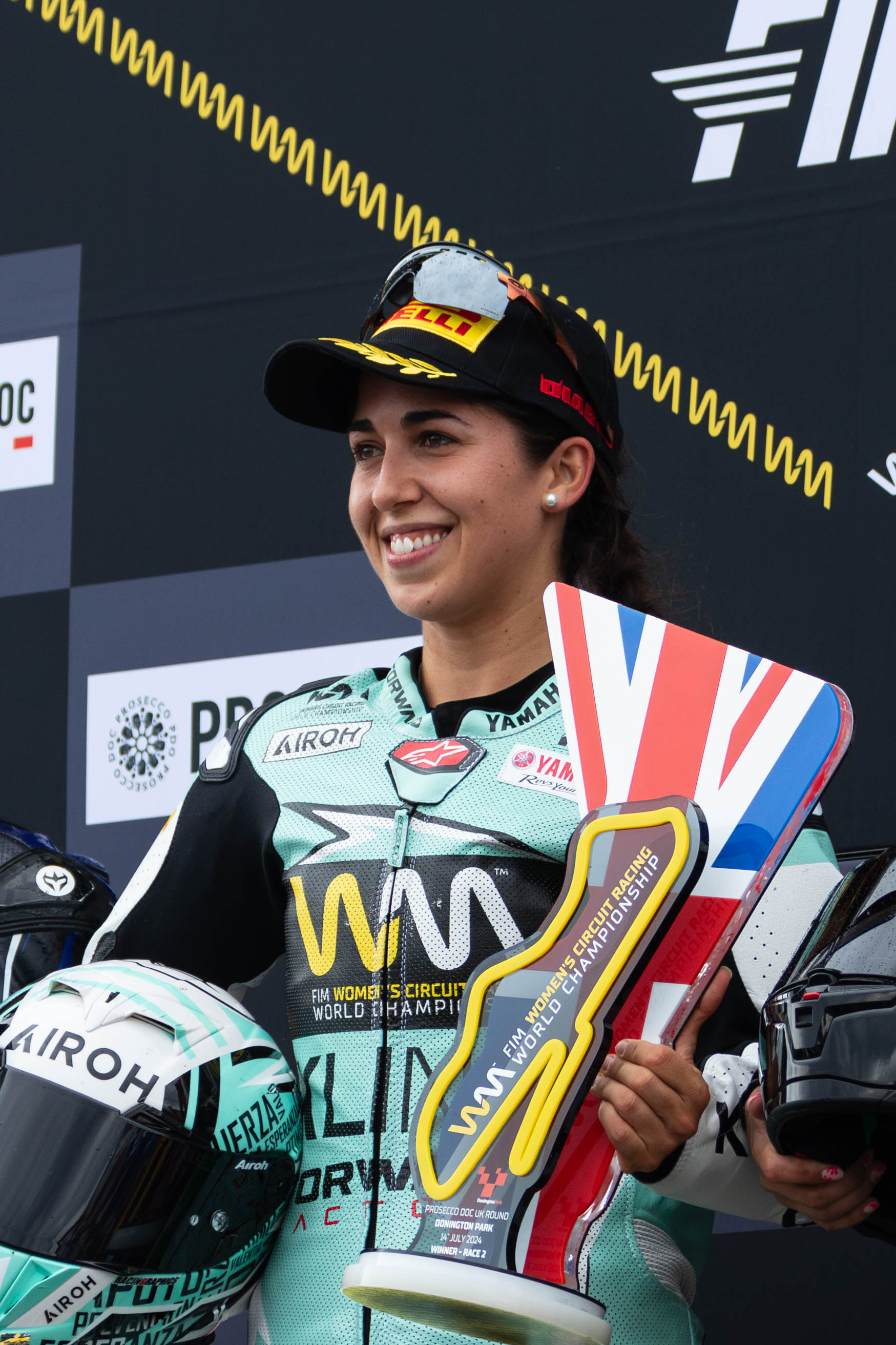
Maria Herrera, (pictured in 2024), was the 2025 FIM Women's Circuit Racing World Champion.

The 2025 FIM Women's Circuit Racing World Championship was the second season of the FIM Women's Circuit Racing World Championship (WorldWCR), the premier female only circuit racing series. Riders competed on identical Yamaha YZF-R7 motorcycles. The rounds were run as support races for 6 of the European rounds of the Superbike World Championship. Format of each round was a Superpole qualifying session on Friday, Race 1 on Saturday and Race 2 on Sunday. The 2024 champion, Ana Carrasco, was not defending her crown, instead moving up to the Supersport World Championship.

Maria Herrera won the championship title at the final round in Jerez.

== Entry list ==
The provisional entry list was released by the FIM on 18 December 2024.

Provisional 2025 entry list
Team	Constructor	Motorcycle	No.	Rider	Rounds
(United Kingdom) Affinity Sports Academy ROKiT Rookies	Yamaha	YZF-R7	88	(Italy) Denise Dal Zotto	2–3
(United Kingdom) Ampito Crescent Yamaha	Yamaha	YZF-R7	36	(Spain) Beatriz Neila	All
(United Kingdom) Carl Cox Motor Sports	Yamaha	YZF-R7	21	(New Zealand) Avalon Lewis	All
(United Kingdom) Carl Cox Motor Sports	Yamaha	YZF-R7	29	(New Zealand) Billee Fuller	1–4
(United Kingdom) Carl Cox Motor Sports	Yamaha	YZF-R7	66	(United Kingdom) Katie Hand	5
(United Kingdom) Carl Cox Motor Sports	Yamaha	YZF-R7	95	(Australia) Tara Morrison	6
(Czech Republic) DafitMotoracing	Yamaha	YZF-R7	19	(Czech Republic) Adéla Ouředníčková	All
(France) FB Racing Team	Yamaha	YZF-R7	22	(Portugal) Madalena Simões	All
(France) FT Racing Academy	Yamaha	YZF-R7	37	(France) Line Vieillard	5
(Australia) Full Throttle Racing	Yamaha	YZF-R7	8	(Australia) Tayla Relph	All
(France) GMT94-Yamaha	Yamaha	YZF-R7	17	(France) Lucie Boudesseul	All
(United Kingdom) GR Motosport	Yamaha	YZF-R7	15	(United Kingdom) Chloe Jones	All
(United Kingdom) Hanks Racing	Yamaha	YZF-R7	76	(United Kingdom) Jamie Hanks-Elliott	All
(Mexico) Italika Racing FIMLA (Mexico) Pons Italika Racing FIMLA	Yamaha	YZF-R7	83	(Mexico) Astrid Madrigal	All
(Mexico) Italika Racing FIMLA (Mexico) Pons Italika Racing FIMLA	Yamaha	YZF-R7	99	(Chile) Isis Carreno	1–2, 5–6
(Mexico) Italika Racing FIMLA (Mexico) Pons Italika Racing FIMLA	Yamaha	YZF-R7	5	(Colombia) Sara Varon	4
(Mexico) Italika Racing FIMLA (Mexico) Pons Italika Racing FIMLA	Yamaha	YZF-R7	9	(Mexico) Karol Bezie	3
(Mexico) Italika Racing FIMLA (Mexico) Pons Italika Racing FIMLA	Yamaha	YZF-R7	78	(Puerto Rico) Elisa Gendron	4
(Switzerland) Klint Forward Racing Team	Yamaha	YZF-R7	6	(Spain) María Herrera	All
(Switzerland) Klint Forward Racing Team	Yamaha	YZF-R7	96	(Italy) Roberta Ponziani	All
(France) MDS	Yamaha	YZF-R7	25	(France) Justine Pedemonte	5
(United States) MKD Racing Team	Yamaha	YZF-R7	14	(United States) Mallory Dobbs	All
(France) Ongaro Racing Team	Yamaha	YZF-R7	28	(France) Ornella Ongaro	All
(Spain) PR46+1 Racing Team	Yamaha	YZF-R7	46	(Spain) Pakita Ruiz	All
(Australia) Tara Morrison Racing	Yamaha	YZF-R7	95	(Australia) Tara Morrison	3
(Italy) Team GP3 TM36	Yamaha	YZF-R7	94	(Italy) Beatrice Barbera	All
(Italy) Team Trasimeno	Yamaha	YZF-R7	32	(United States) Sonya Lloyd	All
(Italy) Team Trasimeno	Yamaha	YZF-R7	52	(South Africa) Jessica Howden	All
(Italy) Terra & Vita GRT Yamaha WorldWCR Team	Yamaha	YZF-R7	20	(Spain) Natalia Rivera	All
(Italy) Terra & Vita GRT Yamaha WorldWCR Team	Yamaha	YZF-R7	64	(Spain) Sara Sánchez	All
(Germany) TSL-Racing	Yamaha	YZF-R7	16	(Germany) Lucy Michel	All
(Ukraine) Vector Racing	Yamaha	YZF-R7	53	(Ukraine) Iryna Nadieieva	6
WT Team Taiwan	Yamaha	YZF-R7	33	(Chinese Taipei) Chun Mei Liu	All
(Spain) YVS Sabadell	Yamaha	YZF-R7	58	(Spain) Paola Ramos	6
(Belgium) Zelos Trasimeno	Yamaha	YZF-R7	4	(France) Emily Bondi	1–5

Key
Regular rider
Wildcard rider
Replacement rider

=== Team and rider changes ===
- Reigning champion Ana Carrasco will not defend her crown in 2025, instead she moves to the Supersport World Championship, riding for Honda France in the WorldSSP Challenge. Evan Bros Racing Yamaha Team, who entered Carrasco in 2024, are not competing in 2025.
- Yamaha Motoxracing WCR Team are not competing in 2025. Riders Roberta Ponziani joined Klint Forward Team, who had increased their entry to two bikes for 2025, and Ornella Ongaro races for Ongaro Racing.
- Sonya Lloyd, who had participated in the series in 2024 as a wildcard at Jerez, joined Team Trasimeno with factory support from Yamaha USA.
- Ran Yochay was replaced at Terra&Vita by Natalia Rivera, winner of the 2024 Women's European Championship.
- Isis Carreno moved from AD78 FIM Latinoamerica by Team GP3 to Italika Racing FIMLA, replacing Sarah Varon.
- Carl Cox Motor Sports, who had entered Avalon Lewis as a wildcard at Cremona in 2024, are fielding two bikes for the full season with riders Lewis and Billee Fuller, winner of the 2024 WIL Sport Women’s Cup and also the Carl Cox Motorsport Ninja Cup.
- GR Motorsport, who have participated in BSB for many years, are fielding Chloe Jones for the full season after entering her as a wildcard at Jerez in 2024.
- Sekhmet Motorcycle Racing Team are not participating in 2025. Mallory Dobbs moved to new entrants MKD Racing Team. Alyssia Whitmore is not competing this year, and Jamie Hanks-Elliott, who replaced an injured Whitmore for 3 rounds in 2024 competes for Hanks Racing in 2025.
- Team GP3, who had entered Beatrice Barbera as a wildcard at Misano in 2024, are fielding Barbera for the full season in 2025.
- FB Racing Team have entered the championship with Madalena Simões riding for them.
- Long-time Endurance and WorldSSP racing team GMT94 have entered the championship with Lucie Boudesseul, who previously competed in the French Superbike Championship, riding for them.
- Nicole Van Aswegen, Lena Kemmer, Andrea Sibaja, Iryna Nadieieva, Mia Rusthen and Luna Hirano, who all participated in 2024, were not entered this season.
- Andalaft Racing, Bertl K. Racing, Deza - Box 77 Racing Team, Lloyd Motorsports, MPS.RT, Rusthen Racing and Team Luna are no longer participating in 2025.
- Isis Carreno was unable to participate in rounds 3 and 4 whilst recovering from surgery. Pons Italika Racing FIMLA entered Mexican Karol Bezie as a replacement rider at Donington and American Elisa Gendron at Balaton Park.
- Billee Fuller announced in August that she would not compete in the final 2 rounds of the championship. Carl Cox Motorsports replaced her with British rider Kate Hand at Magny-Cours and Tara Morrison in Jerez.

==== Wildcards ====
- Italian rider Denise Dal Zotto joined the grid for round 2 at Cremona and round 3 at Donington with the Affinity Sports Academy Rokit Rookies team.
- Australian Tara Morrison (Tara Morrison Racing) joined the grid for round 3 at Donington, she also stood in for Billee Fuller at round 6 in Jerez for Carl Cox Motor Sports.
- Pons Italika Racing FIMLA entered Colombian Sara Varon, who had raced in WorldWCR in 2024, as a wildcard at Balaton Park.
- At Magny-Cours MDS entered Justine Pedemonte and FT Racing Academy entered Line Vieillard as wildcards.
- Iryna Nadieieva (Vector Racing), who had raced in WorldWCR in 2024 and Spaniard Paola Ramos (YVS Sabadell) were entered as wildcards at round 6 in Jerez.

== Race calendar ==
Location of races in 2025.

On 11 October 2024 the provisional 2025 WorldWCR calendar was published. The scheduled rounds are:

Circuit	Date
(Netherlands) TT Circuit Assen	11–13 April
(Italy) Cremona Circuit	2–4 May
(United Kingdom) Donington Park	11–13 July
(Hungary) Balaton Park Circuit	25–27 July (Note: Subject to homologation)
(France) Circuit de Nevers Magny-Cours	5–7 September
(Spain) Circuito de Jerez	17–19 October (Note: Subject to contract)

== Results and standings ==
2025 race results
Round			Circuit	Pole position (Note: Pole for race one set by Superpole, pole for Race 2 set by fastest lap in Race 1)	Fastest lap	Winning rider	Winning team	Source
1	R1	(Netherlands) Dutch Round	(Netherlands) TT Circuit Assen	(Spain) María Herrera	(Spain) Beatriz Neila	(Spain) María Herrera	(Switzerland) Klint Forward Racing Team	
1	R2	(Netherlands) Dutch Round	(Netherlands) TT Circuit Assen		(Spain) Beatriz Neila	(Spain) Beatriz Neila	(United Kingdom) Ampito Crescent Yamaha	
2	R1	(Italy) Italian Round	(Italy) Cremona Circuit	(Spain) María Herrera	(Italy) Roberta Ponziani	(Italy) Roberta Ponziani	(Switzerland) Klint Forward Racing Team	
2	R2	(Italy) Italian Round	(Italy) Cremona Circuit		(Italy) Roberta Ponziani	(Spain) María Herrera	(Switzerland) Klint Forward Racing Team	
3	R1	(United Kingdom) UK Round	(United Kingdom) Donington Park	(Spain) Beatriz Neila	(Spain) Beatriz Neila	(Spain) María Herrera	(Switzerland) Klint Forward Racing Team	
3	R2	(United Kingdom) UK Round	(United Kingdom) Donington Park		(Spain) Beatriz Neila	(Spain) Beatriz Neila	(United Kingdom) Ampito Crescent Yamaha	
4	R1	(Hungary) Hungarian Round	(Hungary) Balaton Park Circuit	(Spain) Beatriz Neila	(Italy) Roberta Ponziani	(Spain) María Herrera	(Switzerland) Klint Forward Racing Team	
4	R2	(Hungary) Hungarian Round	(Hungary) Balaton Park Circuit		(United Kingdom) Chloe Jones	(Spain) Beatriz Neila	(United Kingdom) Ampito Crescent Yamaha	
5	R1	(France) French Round	(France) Circuit de Nevers Magny-Cours	(United Kingdom) Chloe Jones	(United Kingdom) Chloe Jones	(Spain) María Herrera	(Switzerland) Klint Forward Racing Team	
5	R2	(France) French Round	(France) Circuit de Nevers Magny-Cours		(United Kingdom) Chloe Jones	(Spain) Beatriz Neila	(United Kingdom) Ampito Crescent Yamaha	
6	R1	(Spain) Spanish Round	(Spain) Circuito de Jerez	(Spain) María Herrera	(Spain) Paola Ramos	(Spain) María Herrera (Note: Paola Ramos crossed the line first, but was penalized 3 seconds for irresponsible riding. María Herrera inherited the win.)	(Switzerland) Klint Forward Racing Team	
6	R2	(Spain) Spanish Round	(Spain) Circuito de Jerez		(Spain) Paola Ramos	(Spain) Paola Ramos	(Spain) YVS Sabadell	

=== Points ===
Points system
Position	1	2	3	4	5	6	7	8	9	10	11	12	13	14	15
Points	25	20	16	13	11	10	9	8	7	6	5	4	3	2	1

=== Riders' championship ===
Pos.	Rider	ASS (Netherlands)		CRE (Italy)		DON (United Kingdom)		BAL (Hungary)		MAG (France)		JER (Spain)		Pts.
1	(Spain) María Herrera	**1**	2	**2**	1	1	3	1	3	1	4	**1**	6	245
2	(Spain) Beatriz Neila	2	**1**	3	3	**2**	**1**	**3**	1	3	1	3	2	240
3	(United Kingdom) Chloe Jones	6	7	11	8	3	11	2	2	**2**	**2**	2	5	164
4	(Italy) Roberta Ponziani	5	4	1	**2**	10	5	4	**4**	4	5	5	7	156
5	(Spain) Sara Sánchez	3	3	5	4	4	2	5	5	Ret	DNS	9	8	126
6	(France) Lucie Boudesseul	Ret	9	8	9	5	4	9	9	5	3	6	3	113
7	(Spain) Pakita Ruiz	12	5	10	7	6	6	6	6	13	9	8	4	101
8	(New Zealand) Avalon Lewis	4	Ret	6	5	9	Ret	8	7	11	7	11	11	82
9	(Mexico) Astrid Madrigal	8	8	4	6	12	10	10	10	12	13	13	12	75
10	(Australia) Tayla Relph	7	6	7	10	13	7	Ret	11	8	DSQ	7	9	75
11	(Spain) Natalia Rivera	DSQ	15	14	18	11	9	12	13	6	6	10	10	54
12	(South Africa) Jessica Howden	11	14	Ret	17	7	Ret	7	8	14	12	Ret	DNS	39
13	(Spain) Paola Ramos											4	**1**	38
14	(United States) Mallory Dobbs	15	13	Ret	12	25	12	15	15	10	10	12	Ret	30
15	(France) Ornella Ongaro	13	12	18	15	8	8	Ret	DNS	20	18	20	18	24
16	(Chile) Isis Carreno	10	10	9	Ret					18	14	15	14	24
17	(Germany) Lucy Michel	Ret	17	12	11	14	13	13	16	15	17	14	13	23
18	(France) Justine Pedemonte									7	9			16
19	(France) Emily Bondi	9	11	Ret	13	19	18	17	17	Ret	DNS			15
20	(France) Line Vieillard									9	11			12
21	(Colombia) Sara Varon							11	12					9
22	(Czech Republic) Adéla Ouředníčková	14	16	13	16	15	14	16	18	17	16	16	15	9
23	(Chinese Taipei) Chun Mei Liu	17	19	16	19	16	17	14	14	16	15	17	16	5
24	(Italy) Denise Dal Zotto			15	14	21	15							4
25	(United Kingdom) Jamie Hanks-Elliott	16	18	17	20	17	16	19	19	22	19	21	Ret	0
26	(Portugal) Madalena Simōes	21	23	22	Ret	20	19	18	20	19	Ret	19	17	0
27	(United States) Sonya Lloyd	18	20	19	21	24	22	20	22	Ret	21	18	19	0
28	(Australia) Tara Morrison					18	20					23	20	0
29	(New Zealand) Billee Fuller	19	21	20	22	22	21	21	21					0
30	(Italy) Beatrice Barbera	20	22	21	23	23	23	22	23	23	22	24	22	0
31	(United Kingdom) Katie Hand									21	20			0
32	(Ukraine) Iryna Nadieiva											22	21	0
33	(Puerto Rico) Elisa Gendron							23	24					0
–	(Mexico) Karol Bezie					DNQ	DNQ							0
Pos.	Rider	ASS (Netherlands)		CRE (Italy)		DON (United Kingdom)		BAL (Hungary)		MAG (France)		JER (Spain)		Pts.

Colour	Result
Gold	Winner
Silver	Second place
Bronze	Third place
Green	Points classification
Blue	Non-points classification
Blue	Non-classified finish (NC)
Purple	Retired, not classified (Ret)
Red	Did not qualify (DNQ)
Red	Did not pre-qualify (DNPQ)
Black	Disqualified (DSQ)
White	Did not start (DNS)
White	Withdrew (WD)
White	Race cancelled (C)
Blank	Did not practice (DNP)
Blank	Did not arrive (DNA)
Blank	Excluded (EX)

**Bold** – Pole position
Italics – Fastest lap
