= CFMoto 675SR-R =

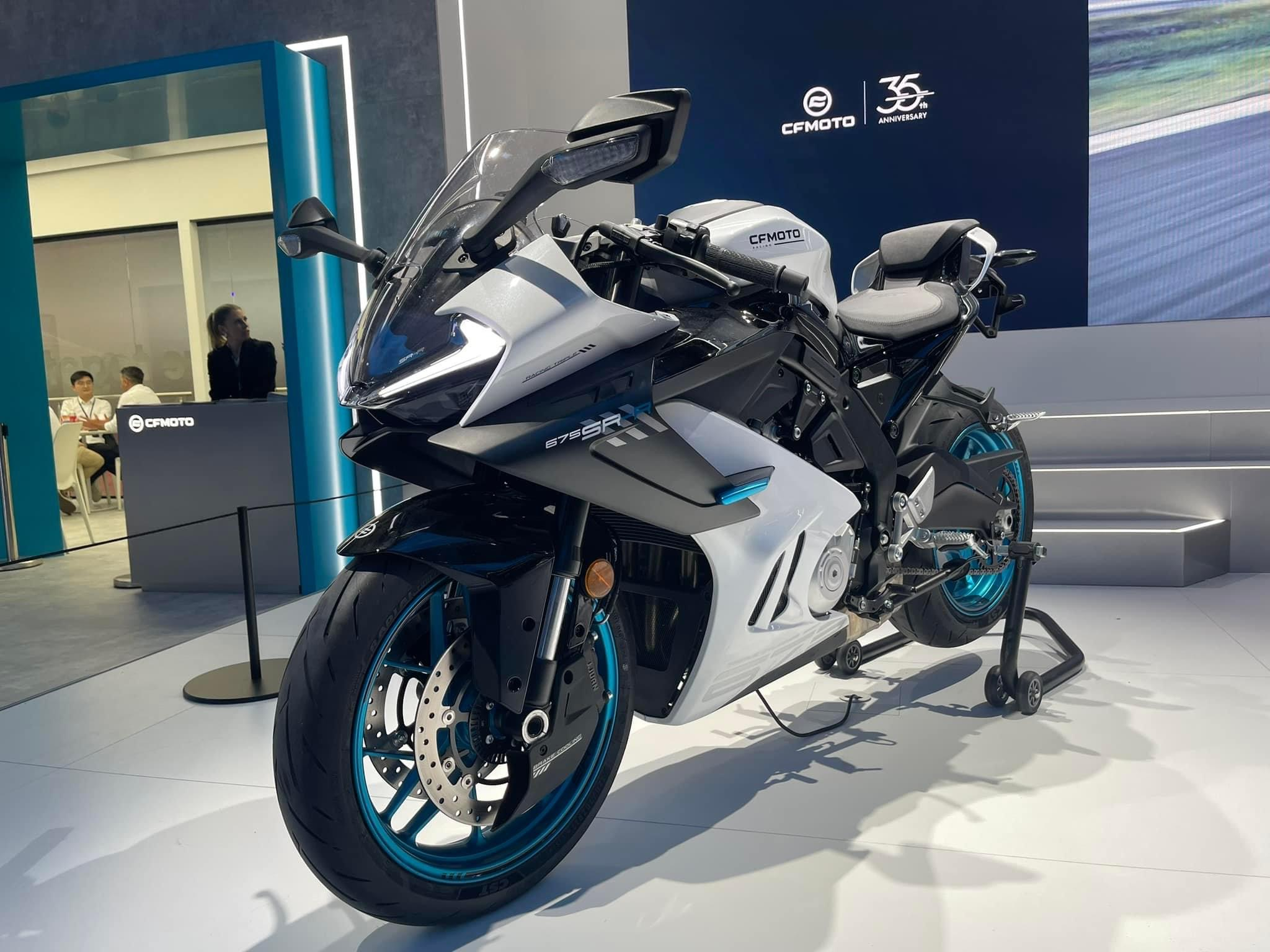
- Manufacturer: CFMoto
- Production: 2025-
- Class: Sportsbike
- Engine: 674 cc (41.1 cu in) DOHC 4 valve water cooled triple
- Bore / stroke: 72 mm × 55.2 mm (2.83 in × 2.17 in)
- Power: 94 bhp (70 kW) @ 10,250rpm; 88 bhp (66 kW) Euro 5+ versions
- Torque: 70 N⋅m (52 lbf⋅ft) @ 8,250rpm
- Transmission: 6 speed gearbox, chain drive
- Suspension: Front: telescopic forks; Rear:monoshock
- Brakes: Front: twin 300 mm (12 in) discs; Rear:single 240 mm (9.4 in) disc
- Tyres: Front: 120/70-ZR17; Rear: 180/55-ZR17
- Wheelbase: 1,400 mm (55 in)
- Seat height: 1,400 mm (55 in)
- Weight: 175 kg (386 lb) (dry); 195 kg (430 lb) (wet)
- Fuel capacity: 15 L (3.3 imp gal; 4.0 US gal)

The CFMoto 675SR-R is 675 cc (41.2 cu in) three cylinder sportsbike manufactured by CFMoto in China that was put into production in 2025. From 2027 the bike will be the sole bike used in the FIM Women's Circuit Racing World Championship.

== History ==
A prototype of the 675SR-R was run in front of fans at the Hunan International Circuit in September 2023. It had a full camouflage wrap. The three cylinder engine was first shown at the November 2023 EICMA Milan show with CFMoto predicting a power output of 'over 100 bhp (75 kW)'.

In May 2024 a limited edition 675 SR-R Aspar was announced. This limited edition is a tribute to the Spanish Aspar Team and its founder Jorge 'Aspar' Martínez. CFMoto was having a successful partnership with the Aspar Team in Moto2 and Moto3. The bike was painted in Aspar Team colours and caries the number 5 which was used by Martínez during his racing career.

As well as their central facility in China, the bike was also developed at CFMoto's R&D centres in Italy and America. The Aspar Team helped develop the handling of the bike.

The production version was launched at a press day at the Algarve International Circuit in March 2025. Production versions produce 94 bhp (70 kW) except in Europe, where compliance with Euro 5+ regulations reduces power to 88 bhp (66 kW).

== Racing ==
=== British Sportbike Championship ===
The bike has been campaigned in 2025 and 2026 in the British Sportbike Championship by Moto Twelve. Riders Adon Davie and Richard Cooper finished 5th and 10th respectively in the 2026 championship.

=== WorldWCR ===
In October 2026 it was announced that CFMoto would become the sole supplier of motorcycles for the series, taking over from Yamaha who had been supplying the series since its inauguration in 2024. CFMoto and series organiser Dorna signed a deal to supply bikes for three years starting in 2027. The 675SR-R is estimated to produce 15 bhp (11 kW) more than the Yamaha YZF-R7 it replaces.

CFMoto will prepare the race bikes, supply spares and have a technical team attending the races.

== A2 licence version ==
The 70 kW (94 hp) power output of the CFMoto 675SR-R is the maximum for motorcycles that can be restricted to 35 kW (47 hp) for use by A2 licence holders. In March 2026 an A2 compliant version of the bike was announced. Once the rider had obtained an unrestricted A licence the restriction kit can be removed at an official CFMoto dealer.

== Technical details ==
=== Engine and transmission ===
The 674 cc (41.1 cu in) water cooled DOHC triple shares the same bore and stroke (72mm x 55.2mm) with the company's existing 450 cc (27 cu in) parallel twin. It is fitted with 4 valves per cylinder. The crankshaft uses a 120° layout and a balance shaft is fitted. A Bosch developed fuel injection system controls fuel. Transmission is by a slipper clutch six speed gearbox.

CFMoto claim the engine/transmission weights 54kg, 10% lighter than it's rivals.

=== Cycle parts ===
The bike uses a beam frame made of chrome-molybdenum steel and an aluminium alloy swinging arm. Front suspension is by adjustable upside down forks and at the rear a monoshock unit is fitted. Both are made by KYB.

Brakes are from Brembo subsidiary J.Juan with twin 300 mm (12 in) discs and four piston callipers at the front and a single 240 mm (9.4 in) disc at the rear.

Cast wheels are fitted with 120/70 x 17 front and 180/55 x 17 rear CST tyres.

=== Electronics ===
Adjustable traction control, ABS and a quickshifter for upshifts only are fitted.
