= Paola Ramos (disambiguation) =

Paola Ramos may refer to:

- Paola Ramos (born 1975), Peruvian former volleyball player
- Paola Ramos (journalist) (born 1987), American journalist
- Paola Ramos (motorcyclist) (born 2007), Spanish motorcycle racer
