= Motorcycle practical test =

The UK practical motorcycle tests consist of a practical test of two modules. To first ride on the road, a candidate must complete Compulsory Basic Training, however, there is no test.

To pass the practical motorcycle test candidates need to pass its two separate modules within two years of passing their motorcycle theory test. Riders must use a motorcycle from an approved category with an approved power-to-weight ratio.

== Module 1: off-road manoeuvres ==
Module 1 takes approximately 20 minutes and is conducted in a safe off-road area. It consists of:

- wheeling the moped or motorcycle and using the stand
- riding a slalom and figure of 8
- a slow ride
- a U-turn
- cornering and controlled stop
- cornering and the emergency stop
- cornering and hazard avoidance

The minimum speed for the hazard avoidance and emergency stop exercises are 19 mph (30 km/h) for mopeds and 32 mph (50 km/h) for motorcycles.

Course layouts are variable and depend on the testing location. Cones are used to mark hazards and turning points.

== Module 2: on-road riding ==
The second module is the on-road test, but also includes an eyesight test and safety questions as well as road riding.

=== Eyesight test ===
The candidate must read a number plate on a parked vehicle 20m away. Failure at this point means the test is cancelled.

=== Safety questions ===
The examiner will ask the candidate several safety questions (there is no prescribed number). A full list of the safety questions is available here.

=== Road riding ===
The candidate will be in contact with the examiner using a radio and must complete normal stops, angle starts (pulling out from behind a vehicle) and a hill start.

=== Independent riding ===
The candidate is given an approximate location to navigate to and the examiner follows, observing the ride. The candidate is not tested on whether he or she arrives at the intended destination, only the quality of riding. The candidate must follow the traffic signs and road rules.

If the candidate passes, the examiner will give instructions on how to change the provisional licence to a full one for that class of motorcycle.

== Licence Categories ==
There are 4 different motorcycle licences that are obtainable dependent on age:

AM (moped licence)

Available to those over 16 years of age, successful completion of the AM test allows the licence holder to ride a moped of no more than 50cc in engine size, capable of producing no more than 4kw in power and restricted to a speed of 30 mph (50 km/h). All licence holders of this class must display red and white 'L' (Learner) plates on the front and rear of their moped. Licence holders in Wales can also display 'D' plates if they prefer. The 'D' stands for 'Dysgwyr', the Welsh word for "Learner" in English.

A1 light motorcycle licence

Available to those over 17 years of age, successful completion of the A1 test allows the licence holder to ride any motorcycle of no more than 125cc and of 11kw in power. There is no maximum speed restriction.

A2 restricted motorcycle licence

Available to those over 19 years of age, successful completion of the A2 test allows the licence holder to ride any motorcycle not exceeding 35kW in power and with a power-to-weight ratio below 0.2kW per kg. Under this licence more powerful motorcycles may be ridden, however they must be restricted to 35kW, and must not have an unrestricted power of over 70kW. There is no maximum speed restriction.

Category A (full) unrestricted motorcycle licence

Available to those aged 21–23 years of age via completion of the A2 licence and waiting two years whereupon they will then become eligible to take the Category A test. Or directly available to those over 24 years of age upon passing the category A test. Successful completion of this test allows the licence holder to ride any motorcycle of any engine size with no power or maximum speed restrictions.

All tests must be completed on motorcycles relevant to the engine size and power restrictions of the licence being applied for.

The Module 1 and 2 tests are identical for all licensing categories, the only difference being the vehicle that must be used in each test and, for AM, the speed required in certain manoeuvres. All test categories may be completed on either geared or automatic motorcycles. Completion of the tests on geared motorcycles allows the licence holder to ride either geared or automatic bikes, whereas completion of the test on automatic bikes restricts the licence holder to automatic motorcycles only.

Pillion entitlement and motorway access are also gained upon successful completion of any of the four licence categories.

DVSA publishes Routes to your motorcycle licence which explains the options for different classes of motorcycle licence at different ages.
