= MotoGP Sports Entertainment Group =

Motorcycle tarmac racing organisers

- Formerly: Dorna Sports, S.L.
- Type: Sociedad Limitada
- Industry: Sports management
- Founded: 27 May 1988
- Headquarters: Madrid, Spain
- Area served: Worldwide
- Key people: Carmelo Ezpeleta, CEO; Carlos Ezpeleta, Deputy CEO
- Products: MotoGP; WorldSBK; WorldWCR; Bagger World Cup
- Parent: Liberty Media (84%); MotoGP Executive Management (16%)
- Website: www.motogpcorporate.com

MotoGP Sports Entertainment Group is the commercial rights' holder for the motorcycling sport of Grand Prix racing.

Established in 1988 as an international sports management and marketing company, it is headquartered in Madrid, with branch offices and/or subsidiaries in Barcelona, Amsterdam, London and Rome. Established by Banco Banesto as Dorna promoción del deporte, the company was sold to CVC Madrid in 1998 as the operation developed internationally and was renamed Dorna Sports. Private equity group Bridgepoint has been the majority shareholder of Dorna since 2006.

On 1 April 2024, it was announced that Liberty Media planned to take over 86% of Dorna, valuing the purchase at €4.2 billion ($4.5 billion). The deal was completed on 3 July 2025 after the approval from the European Commission with Liberty Media acquiring 84% of the company instead of 86%.

In February 2026, Dorna Sports was renamed as MotoGP Sports Entertainment Group.

== Rights holdings ==
Dorna logo until 2026.

MotoGP Sports Entertainment Group (formerly Dorna Sports) is the exclusive holder of all commercial and television rights relating to the Grand Prix motorcycle racing and Superbike World Championship. The company also participates in the management and marketing of other motorsports properties, including the FIM JuniorGP World Championship.

The company previously promoted British Superbike Championship until MotorSport Vision acquired the commercial rights for BSB in 2008.

The company gained the commercial rights for Grand Prix motorcycle racing after the FIM-IRTA war, starting in 1992 as part of a consortium with Bernie Ecclestone and IRTA and as sole rights owner since 1993. The company gained the commercial rights for Superbike World Championship in 2013 after its then owner Bridgepoint Group transferred Superbike World Championship from then sister company Infront Sports (Infront previously acquired the founding promoter FGSport in 2007, Bridgepoint later acquired Infront in 2011).

=== MotoGP ===
Dorna (now MotoGP Sports Entertainment Group) recognised, with support from manufacturers, that a change was needed in the sport. The costs of developing specialist two-stroke engines, which created non-commercial end products, was not sustainable. Hence, in its efforts to bring about the change from 500cc racing to MotoGP four-stroke racing, Dorna has obtained the world championship organization rights from the FIM (Fédération Internationale de Motocyclisme) which is the world governing sole body of motorcycling with authority to organise motorcycle world championships.

== Ownership ==
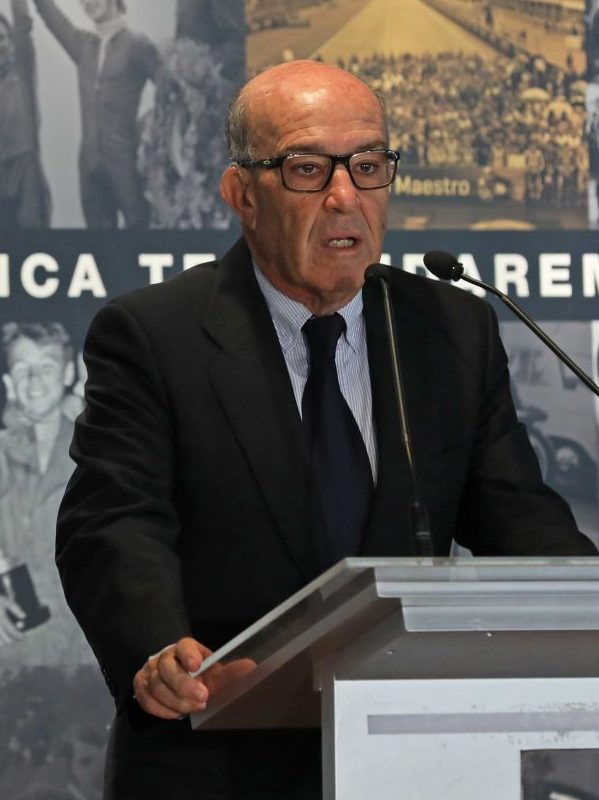
Carmelo Ezpeleta, Dorna Sports CEO

Set up by Banco Banesto as Dorna promocion del deporte, the company was sold to CVC Madrid in 1998 as the operation developed internationally and was renamed Dorna Sports. The purchase was closely supervised by American Hardy McLain, cost $80 million (approximately), half of which was needed to pay off Dorna debt. McLain, one of the founders of CVC and formerly an executive of Citibank (CVC was spun out of Citibank in 1981), was present at several motorcycle Grand Prix events in 1998 but, confident in the ability of Dorna CEO Carmelo Ezpeleta, has left the running of the company to the Spaniard, as well as the almost completely Spanish Dorna executive leadership.

=== Sale to management ===
In November 2005 CVC Capital Partners announced it was to acquire the 25% and 48% shares of Bambino and Bayerische Landesbank in Formula One commercial rights' holder SLEC and acquired the shares of JPMorgan Chase in December 2005. This deal was given approval by the European Commission on 21 March 2006 subject to the sale of Dorna Sports.

By divesting Dorna, the Commission concluded that CVC's Formula One transaction would not cause competition concerns. Competition commissioner Neelie Kroes, said: “When the two most popular motor sport events in the EU, Formula One and Moto GP, come in the hands of one owner, there is a risk of price increases for the TV rights to these events and a reduction in consumer choice. I am satisfied that the commitments given by CVC will eliminate this risk.” Its final 71% stake in Dorna was sold by CVC for £400million on 28 March, selling the holding to Dorna Sports management.

In October 2023, third-party sources were reporting that Spanish news website El Confidencial had suggested Dorna Sports could be available for sale at the price of €2 billion.

=== Liberty Media acquisition ===
On 1 April 2024, Liberty Media announced that it had agreed with Dorna to acquire 86% of the company for €4.2 billion, with 14% being retained by Dorna's management team. This deal was expected to close by the end of 2024, subject to regulatory approval. Due to a Phase-II investigation from the European Commission, it was delayed multiple times. The European Commission later approved the deal and the deal was completed on 3 July 2025 with Liberty Media acquiring 84% of the company instead of 86%. Dorna became part of the Formula One Group.

== Controversy ==
=== 2025 MotoGP Legends/Hall of Fame split ===
In 2025, the decision was announced to split the MotoGP Legends from the Hall of Fame. The new Hall of Fame would only constitute premier-class (MotoGP/500cc) riders, excluding those who were successful in the lower classes. This move has been criticized by the MotoGP community, who have called Dorna and Liberty Media out for "erasing history", an example of this being Giacomo Agostini, who had won 15 world championship titles, being considered an 8-time champíon instead.
