= Balaton Park Circuit =

Motor racing circuit in Hungary

- Full Circuit (2023–present)

- Motorcycle Circuit (2025)
- Location: Balatonfőkajár, Hungary
- Coordinates: 47°00′29″N 18°11′56″E
- Capacity: 10,000
- FIA Grade: 2
- Owner: Private Investment Group
- Broke ground: 2013
- Opened: May 2023; 3 years ago
- Architect: Ferenc Gulácsi
- Major events: Current: Grand Prix motorcycle racing Hungarian motorcycle Grand Prix (2025–2026); World SBK (2025–2026); Former: TCR Eastern Europe (2024–2025); Ferrari Challenge Europe (2024); F4 CEZ (2023–2024)
- Website: http://www.balatonparkcircuit.com/

Full Circuit (2023–present)
- Length: 4.115 km (2.557 mi)
- Turns: 16
- Race lap record: 1:34.466 ( (Italy) Giacomo Altoè, Ferrari 296 Challenge, 2024, Ferrari Challenge)

Motorcycle Circuit (2025–present)
- Length: 4.075 km (2.532 mi)
- Turns: 17
- Race lap record: 1:37.699 ( (Spain) Marc Márquez, Ducati Desmosedici GP25, 2025, MotoGP)

Balaton Park Circuit is a 4.115 km (2.557 mi) motor racing circuit located near Balatonfőkajár, Hungary, 85 km (53 mi) southwest of Budapest. The track is designed to host regional and international races. The circuit was opened in May 2023.

== History ==
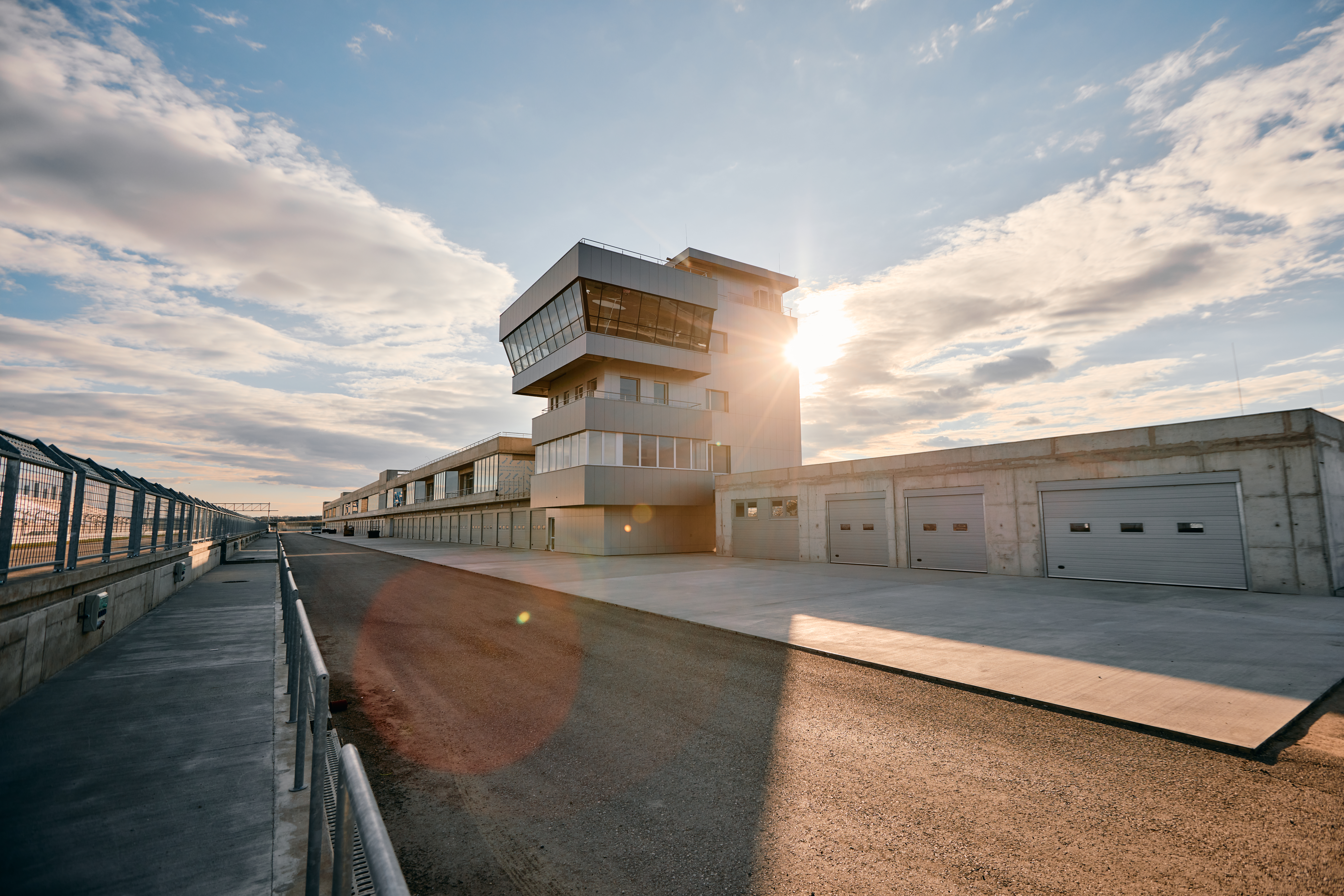
Balaton Park Circuit – Pitlane

The main phase of construction for the Balaton Park started in 2019. The racetrack is owned by a private group of investors led by former racecar driver Chanoch Nissany, with the circuit's secondary goal to be to act as a test circuit for Nissan. The project was financed using the investors' own equity, without any involvement from banks or external funding. The circuit is intended to be a modern addition to Hungary's motor racing scene, complementing the older and well-established Hungaroring circuit.

In September 2023, it was revealed that the circuit would be planned to be included in the Superbike World Championship in 2024, and it would be also the reserve venue of MotoGP World Championship in the same year before the return of Hungarian motorcycle Grand Prix to Hungaroring in 2025. On 26 October 2023, it was confirmed that the circuit will host its first World SBK race on 23–25 August 2024. However, on 7 June 2024, it was announced that the World SBK round at the circuit was replaced by the round at Circuito do Estoril due to the ongoing works at the circuit. On 19 September 2024, it was announced that the circuit would host both Grand Prix motorcycle racing and Superbike World Championship next year, the former would be held in August 2025, the latter would held in July 2025. For these motorcycle races, there were significant changes made for the circuit. Turns 6 and 7, instead of a double apex turn, was converted to two doglegs with a straight connecting the two, a chicane replacing the Turn 11 dogleg, and a tight Turn 13 that connects to a tight right-handed Turn 14 and into a left-handed Turn 15 that ensures walls will be further from the circuit, in which the layout length would be changed as 4.075 km (2.532 mi) for the motorcycle races while the original Grand Prix layout was also retained.

=== World Superbike testing ===
On 22 June 2025, a number of World SBK riders arrived at Balaton Park to test the circuit ahead of its debut round in July. The Balaton Park test saw many WorldSBK riders get their first taste of the Hungarian circuit ahead of its debut on the calendar in July. Among those in attendance were Honda HRC duo Iker Lecuona and Xavi Vierge riding the standard CBR1000RR-R.

=== MotoGP testing ===
In late June 2025, test riders from five MotoGP manufacturers Honda, Yamaha, KTM, Ducati, and Aprilia tested the Balaton Park Circuit. This year, the Hungarian GP was included in both the WSBK and MotoGP calendars, for the first time since 1992. The five test riders included Augusto Fernández of Yamaha, Michele Pirro of Ducati, Pol Espargaró of KTM, Stefan Bradl of Honda, and Lorenzo Savadori of Aprilia.

=== Other testing ===
In August 2025, six Ducati riders, Marc Márquez, Francesco Bagnaia, Alex Márquez, Fermin Aldeguer, Fabio Di Giannantonio, and Franco Morbidelli, participated in a private test at the Balaton Park circuit on 5 August. This test was conducted in preparation for the Hungarian GP debut, which would be held on 22–24 August. The Borgo Panigale-based manufacturer also fielded Ducati test rider Michele Pirro. This private test was conducted on the latest Ducati Panigale V4S motorcycle.

== Design and facilities ==
Differences between automobile and motorcycle circuit layouts of Balaton Park

The Balaton Park Circuit has been planned and constructed according to the FIA Grade 1 standards, initially obtaining a Grade 2 license. The track features Tecpro barriers and 'MyLaps' latest technology, including GPS, LED panels and timing systems.

The track has a length of 4.115 km (2.557 mi) and varies in width between 12–15 m (13–16 yd). It consists of 16 corners, with six right turns and ten left turns in its full layout. The circuit's facilities include 48 pit garages, VIP areas and lounges, media center, medical center, and two additional support paddock areas.

== Events ==
Current

- May: Superbike World Championship, Supersport World Championship, FIM Women's Circuit Racing World Championship, FIM R3 bLU cRU World Cup
- June: Grand Prix motorcycle racing Hungarian motorcycle Grand Prix, Moto4 Northern Cup

Former

- Ferrari Challenge Europe (2024)
- Formula 4 CEZ Championship (2023–2024)
- GT Cup Series (2024–2025)
- Histo-Cup Austria (2024)
- MotoE World Championship
  - Hungarian eRace (2025)
- Porsche Sprint Challenge Central Europe (2025)
- TCR Eastern Europe Touring Car Series (2024–2025)
- TCR European Endurance Touring Car Series (2024)

== Lap records ==
As of June 2026, the fastest official race lap records at the Balaton Park Circuit are listed as:

Category	Time	Driver	Vehicle	Event
Full Circuit (2023–present): 4.115 km (2.557 mi)
Ferrari Challenge	1:34.466	Giacomo Altoè	Ferrari 296 Challenge	2024 Balaton Park Ferrari Challenge Europe round
GT3	1:34.826	Mateusz Lisowski	Mercedes-AMG GT3	2025 Balaton Park FIA CEZ Endurance round
Lamborghini Super Trofeo	1:36.760	Josef Záruba	Lamborghini Huracán LP 620-2 Super Trofeo EVO2	2024 Balaton Park FIA CEZ Endurance round
LMP3	1:37.054	Miro Konôpka	Ligier JS P320	2023 Balaton Park FirstLap Cup
Formula 4	1:37.546	Ethan Ischer	Tatuus F4-T421	2024 Balaton Park F4 CEZ Championship round
Porsche Carrera Cup	1:37.833	David Dziwok	Porsche 911 (992 I) GT3 Cup	2025 Balaton Park Porsche Sprint Challenge Central Europe round
GT4	1:42.662	Richard Gonda	BMW M4 GT4	2024 Balaton Park FIA CEZ Endurance round
TCR Touring Car	1:43.844	Attila Bucsi	Hyundai i30 N TCR	2024 Balaton Park TCR Eastern Europe round
Renault Clio Cup	1:54.336	Bartolomiej Mirecki	Renault Clio R.S. V	2025 Balaton Park Clio Cup Bohemia round
Suzuki Swift Cup	1:58.992	Ádám Mészáros	Suzuki Swift 1.4 Turbo	2025 Balaton Park FIA Swift Cup Europe round
Motorcycle Circuit (2025–present): 4.075 km (2.532 mi)
MotoGP	1:37.699	Marc Márquez	Ducati Desmosedici GP25	2025 Hungarian motorcycle Grand Prix
World SBK	1:38.230	Nicolò Bulega	Ducati Panigale V4 R	2026 Balaton Park World SBK round
Moto2	1:40.893	Manuel González	Kalex Moto2	2026 Hungarian motorcycle Grand Prix
World SSP	1:42.737	Albert Arenas	Yamaha YZF-R9	2026 Balaton Park World SSP round
MotoE	1:45.268	Matteo Ferrari	Ducati V21L	2025 Hungarian motorcycle Grand Prix
Moto3	1:45.700	David Muñoz	KTM RC250GP	2025 Hungarian motorcycle Grand Prix
World WCR	1:51.935	Paola Ramos	Yamaha YZF-R7	2026 Balaton Park World WCR round
Supersport 300	1:58.718	Kakeru Okunuki	Yamaha YZF-R3	2025 Balaton Park FIM BLU CRU World Cup round

== See also ==
- Hungaroring
- Hungarian motorcycle Grand Prix
