= Cremona Circuit =

Race track in Italy

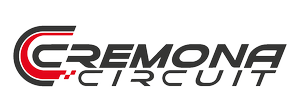

- Full Circuit (2024–present)
- Location: San Martino del Lago, Lombardy, Italy
- Coordinates: 45°5′7.56″N 10°18′43.25″E
- Broke ground: March 2011; 15 years ago
- Opened: 7 July 2011; 15 years ago
- Former names: Circuito di San Martino del Lago (2011–2015)
- Major events: Current: World SBK (2024–present); Sidecar World Championship (2026); Alpe Adria International Motorcycle Championship (2021–2022, 2026); Former: World WCR (2024–2025)
- Website: https://cremonacircuit.it/

Full Circuit (2024–present)
- Length: 3.768 km (2.341 mi)
- Turns: 13
- Race lap record: 1:27.783 ( (Italy) Nicolò Bulega, Ducati Panigale V4 R, 2026, World SBK)

Full Circuit (2021–2023)
- Length: 3.702 km (2.300 mi)
- Turns: 13
- Race lap record: 1:32.434 ( (Italy) Fabrizio Perotti, Aprilia RSV4, 2022, SBK)

Original Circuit (2011–2020)
- Length: 3.450 km (2.144 mi)
- Turns: 11

Cremona Circuit is a 3.768 km (2.341 mi) hard-surfaced race track used for motor racing near San Martino del Lago, Lombardy, Italy, about 25 km (16 mi) east of Cremona. It was inaugurated on 7 July 2011, and named as Circuito di San Martino del Lago until 2015. The circuit was originally 3.450 km (2.144 mi) long. The track was extended to 3.702 km (2.300 mi) in January–April 2021, based on design by the Italian circuit designer Jarno Zaffelli.

== Superbike World Championship ==
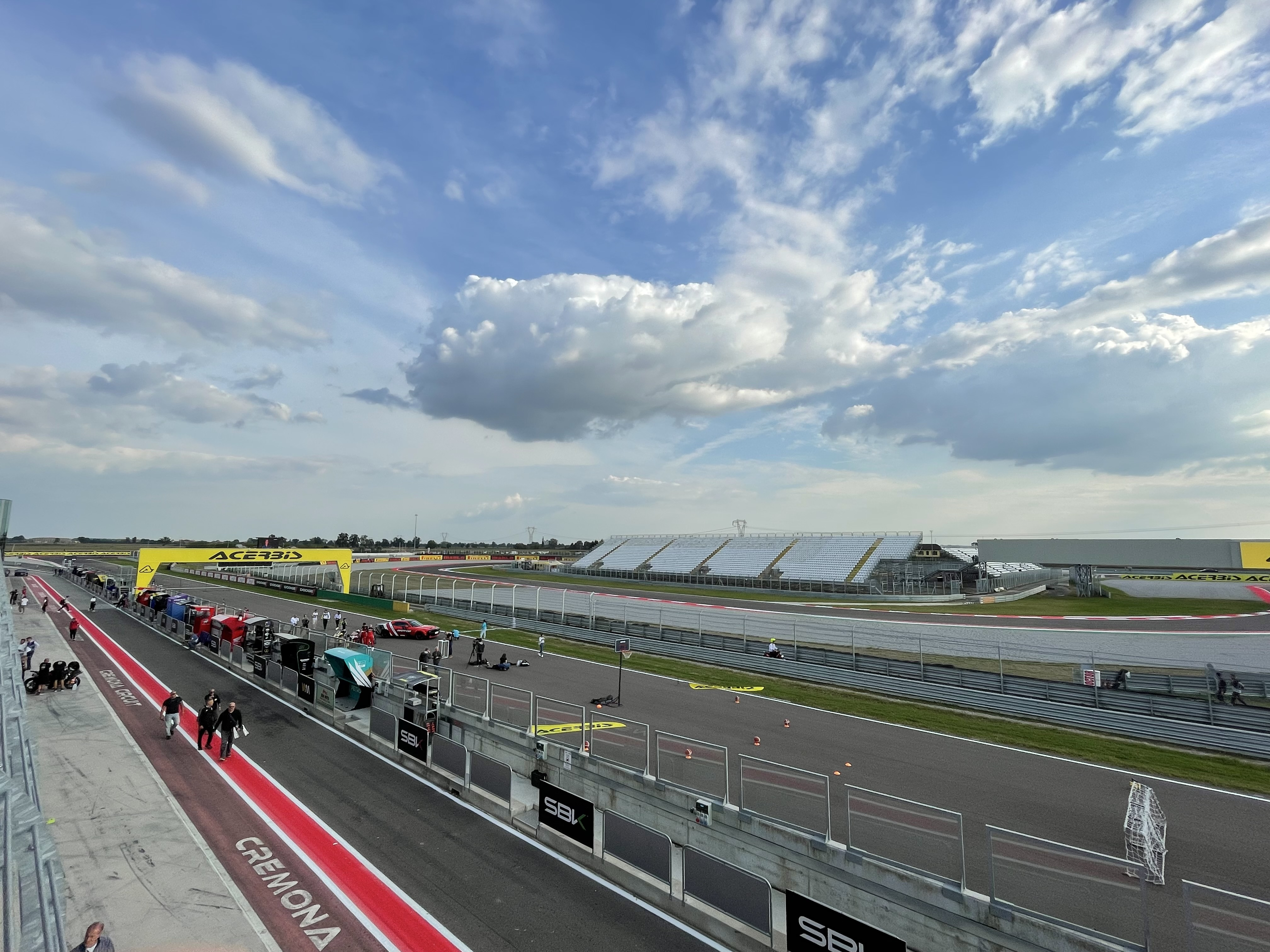
Finish line of the Cremona Circuit

On 26 October 2023, it was announced that the circuit would enter the Superbike World Championship calendar in 2024 with a five-year contract. The track was resurfaced and extended from 3.702 to 3.768 km (2.300 to 2.341 mi), and a new grandstand was built.

== Layout history ==
Cremona Circuit (Circuito di San Martino del Lago) layout history
Original Circuit (2011–2020)

Full Circuit (2024–present)

== Events ==
Current

- August: Sidecar World Championship, Alpe Adria International Motorcycle Championship
- September: Superbike World Championship, Supersport World Championship, Sportbike World Championship, CIV Superbike Championship

Future

- FIM Women's Circuit Racing World Championship (2024–2025, 2027)

== Lap records ==
As of September 2026, the fastest official race lap records at the Cremona Circuit are listed as:

Category	Time	Driver	Vehicle	Event
Full Circuit (2024–present): 3.768 km (2.341 mi)
World SBK	1:27.783	Nicolò Bulega	Ducati Panigale V4 R	2026 Cremona World SBK round
World SSP	1:31.587	Tom Booth-Amos	Triumph Street Triple RS 765	2026 Cremona World SSP round
World SPB	1:36.157	Carter Thompson	Yamaha YZF-R7	2026 Cremona World SPB round
World WCR	1:40.005	Roberta Ponziani	Yamaha YZF-R7	2025 Cremona World WCR round
Supersport 300	1:45.762	Oğuz Taşhan	Kawasaki Ninja 400	2026 Cremona Alpe Adria Supersport 300 round
Full Circuit (2021–2023): 3.702 km (2.300 mi)
Superbike	1:32.434	Fabrizio Perotti	Aprilia RSV4	2022 Cremona Alpe Adria Superbike round
Supersport	1:34.227	Luca Ottaviani	Yamaha YZF-R6	2022 Cremona Alpe Adria Supersport round
Supersport 300	1:43.547	Oliver König	Kawasaki Ninja 400	2021 Cremona Alpe Adria Supersport 300 round

== Fatalities ==
- Gabriele Cottini - 2025 Dunlop Cup 600 Supersport
