= FIM Women's Circuit Racing World Championship =

- Logo since 2024
- Category: Motorcycle racing
- Region: International
- Inaugural season: 2024
- Constructors: 2024-2026 Yamaha; 2027- CFMoto
- Tyre suppliers: 2024-2026 Pirelli; 2027- Michelin
- Riders' champion: (Spain) María Herrera

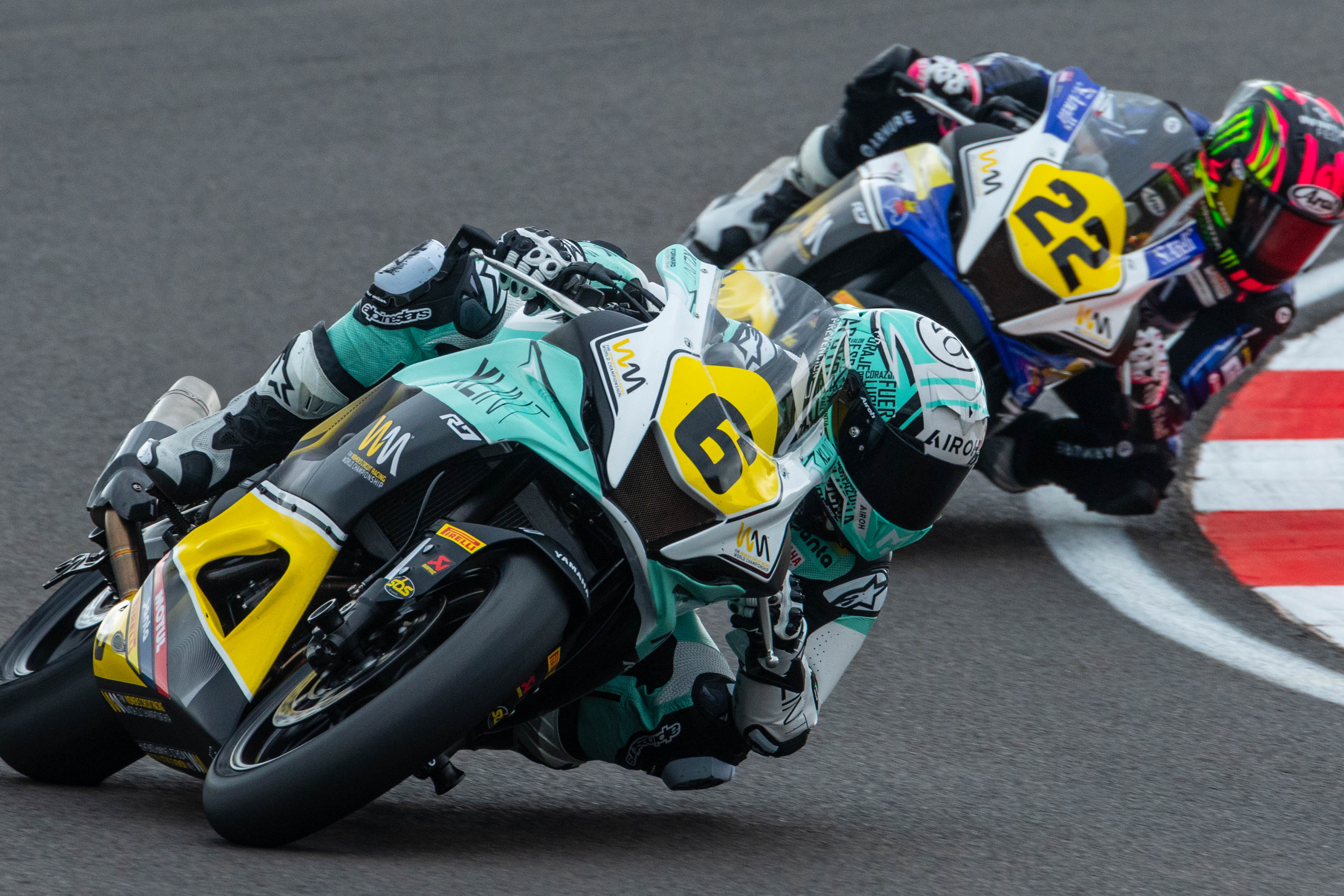
Maria Herrera and Ana Carrasco fighting for the win at Donington Park, 2024

The FIM Women's Circuit Racing World Championship (shortened as WorldWCR) is a women-only racing series organized by the Fédération Internationale de Motocyclisme (FIM) and Dorna, the company that also organizes MotoGP and the Superbike World Championship.

Its creation was announced on 29 April 2023 during the 2023 Spanish motorcycle Grand Prix. In October of that year the details of the championship were announced, predicting that it would begin in July 2024 with a total of 12 races in 6 dates coinciding with the European rounds of the Superbike World Championship. The championship was planned for a total of 22 permanent riders between the ages of 18 and 50, plus two additional invitations per race competing on identical Yamaha YZF R7 motorcycles and Pirelli tires. Although initially a single make series, the intention is to have multiple manufacturers represented. It was announced in October 2026 that from the 2027 season competitors would use CFMoto 675SR-R motorcycles and Michelin tyres. The agreement with CFMoto was for three years and Michelin five years.

Performance wise, the series falls between the Supersport 300 and Supersport series.

The format consists of a qualifying session with Superpole lap and two races per venue. On 4 June 2024, it was announced that all races would be streamed live and free-of-charge via the championship's YouTube channel.

== Background ==
The FIM set up the Commission for Women in Motorcycling (CFM) in 2006 with the aim of bringing more women into motorcycling withstand equal opportunities and treatment for all women involved in motorcycling. In 2013 the CFM organised the first FIM Women’s Road Racing Training Camp at the Circuito de Albacete, Spain with BMW Motorrad supplying BMW S1000RR for the 24 participants. In partnership with BMW further training camps were held at Brno Circuit, Czech Republic in 2014 and Losail International Circuit, Qatar in 2015.

As part of the CFM programme, and with the support of Mamoru Moriwaki, an all-women's team was entered into the Suzuki 4 Hour Endurance Race in 2014 (riders Melissa Paris and Shelina Moreda) and 2015 (Moreda and Avalon Biddle).

In 2014 it was announced that in a new initiative in association with Dorna and FIM Europe, a Women's European Cup (WEC) would be run in conjunction with the European Junior Cup (EJC), that was run as support races for the European rounds of the World Superbike Championship. Female riders in the EJC would be awarded points for both the EJC and the WEC. The competition was open to females aged 14 - 23. The upper age limit was raised to 24 in 2016. With the Supersport 300 World Championship being introduced in 2017 as the introductory class of the Superbike championships, the EJC was redundant and dropped, along with the WEC.

The Women's European Cup was resurrected in 2020. Organised by EMG Eventi and Moto X Racing and sanctioned by FIM Europe and Federazione Motociclistica Italiana, the series used 300 cc motorcycles. It was run over 6 Italian venues as support races for the Campionato Italiano Velocità (Italian championship). In 2023 the series was upgraded to a championship, the Supersport 300 Women’s European Championship, with rounds Italy, Spain and the Czech Republic. Two feeder series were created, The Italian Women’s Speed Championship and the Women’s Cup entry-level trophy. Both the feeder series are run in Italy.

With women's world championships already set up in motocross, enduro, and trials and feeder series in place, the FIM initiated the WorldWCR in 2023 in conjunction with Dorna.

== Regulations ==
=== Technical regulations ===
==== 2024-2026 ====
Identical 2023 Euro 5 specification 689cc liquid-cooled, inline 2-cylinder DOHC Yamaha YZF-R7 (2022 bike) motorcycles are supplied to all competitors and are fitted with a Yamaha GYTR race kit. Maintenance and set-up is carried out by Luca Montiron's JiR organisation although teams may make minor adjustments in set-up.

Pirelli are the sole tyre supplier, the WorldWCR using the same Diablo tyre as used in other Superbike series. Dry tyres are 120/70-17 front and 180/60-17 rear tyres in SC1 compound, and for wet races Diablo Rain tyres in SCR1 compound with a larger 200/60 rear.

Fuel is supplied by Panta Racing Fuel, part of the Mol Group and lubricants by Motul.

==== 2027- ====
Competitors will use identical CFMoto 675SR-R motorcycles which have a 675 cc (41.2 cu in) liquid-cooled, three-cylinder engine. The bike is estimated to produce 15 bhp (11 kW) more than the Yamaha it replaces. CFMoto will prepare the race bikes, supply spares and have a technical team attending the races.

Michelin replace Pirelli as the sole tyre supplier.

=== Sporting regulations ===
Each round is following the same format as WorldSSP with a Superpole qualifying session on Friday and 2 race, one on Saturday and the second on Sunday. Each race has a minimum length of 40 km (25 mi) and a maximum of 70 km (43 mi).

The grid for Race 1 is set by the Superpole qualifying session. For race 2, the first 9 grid positions are set by fastest laps in race 1 and the remaining positions by Superpole times.

The grid consists of 24 permanent female riders. At each round, the Federation of the host nation can nominate 2 "wildcard" entries, additionally Dorna can nominate "one event" entries. The regulations allow a maximum of 30 riders. Competitors must be between the ages of 18 and 50.

The entry fee is set at 25,000€, including the use of a Yamaha YZF R7, a GYTR Racing Kit, Pirelli tyres, fuel, oil, racing service and access to the Paddock Village.

=== Race weekend ===
The format of the race weekend is:

- Friday
  - Free practice (25 minutes)
  - Superpole (25 minutes)
    - Sets the starting positions for Race 1
- Saturday
  - Warm-up (10 minutes)
  - Race 1
- Sunday
  - Warm-up (10 minutes)
  - Race 2
    - Starting positions for the first 9 riders determined by their fastest laps in Race 1

=== Scoring system ===
Points system
Position	1	2	3	4	5	6	7	8	9	10	11	12	13	14	15
Points	25	20	16	13	11	10	9	8	7	6	5	4	3	2	1

== Seasons ==
=== 2024 ===
A provisional entry list for the Women's Circuit Racing World Championship (WorldWCR) was released in February, with 24 participants selected from an initial 40-plus entries.

A two-day test was held at the Cremona racing circuit, Lombardy, Italy, in May with Ana Carrasco topping the timesheets.

On 3 June, María Herrera was announced as an entry to the championship.

The initial schedule included Balaton Park Circuit, Hungary on 23–25 August, but this was later dropped as track improvements would not be completed on time, with Circuito do Estoril, Portugal added on 11–13 October. Scheduled rounds are:

Circuit	Date
(Italy) Misano World Circuit Marco Simoncelli	14–16 June
(United Kingdom) Donington Park Circuit	12–14 July
(Portugal) Autodromo Internacional do Algarve	9–11 August
(Italy) Cremona Circuit	20–22 September (Note: Subject to homologation)
(Portugal) Circuito do Estoril	11–13 October
(Spain) Circuito de Jerez	18–20 October

The championship was won by Ana Carrasco.

=== 2025 ===
On 11 October 2024 the provisional 2025 WorldWCR calendar was published. The scheduled rounds were:

Circuit	Date
(Netherlands) TT Circuit Assen	11–13 April
(Italy) Cremona Circuit	2–4 May
(United Kingdom) Donington Park Circuit	11-13 July
(Hungary) Balaton Park Circuit	25–27 July (Note: Subject to homologation)
(France) Circuit de Nevers Magny-Cours	5–7 September
(Spain) Circuito de Jerez	17–19 October (Note: Subject to contract)

The provisional entry list was released by the FIM on 18 December 2024. Reigning champion Ana Carrasco did not defend her crown in 2025, instead she moved to the Supersport World Championship, riding for Honda France in the WorldSSP Challenge. Maria Herrera was the winner of the championship.

=== 2026 ===
On 18 September 2025 the provisional 2026 WorldWCR calendar was published. The scheduled rounds were:

Circuit	Date
(Portugal) Algarve International Circuit	27–29 March
(Netherlands) TT Circuit Assen	17–19 April
(Hungary) Balaton Park Circuit	1-3 May
(Italy) Misano World Circuit Marco Simoncelli	12–14 June
(United Kingdom) Donington Park Circuit	10–11 July
(Spain) Circuito de Jerez	16–18 October (Note: Subject to contract)

An official test day was scheduled for 23 March 2026 at the Algarve International Circuit.

=== 2027 ===
In October 2026 the provisional 2027 WorldWCR calendar was published. The scheduled rounds were: (Note: The Circuito de Jerez, which had been the venue for the season finale in previous years, would be unavailable due to ongoing renovation works.)

Circuit	Date
(Portugal) Algarve International Circuit	19–21 March
(Spain) Circuit Ricardo Tormo	2–4 April
(Czech Republic) Autodrom Most	4–6 June
(Italy) Misano World Circuit Marco Simoncelli	18–20 June
(France) Circuit de Nevers Magny-Cours	3–5 September
(Italy) Cremona Circuit	26–26 September

A test day is sceduduled be held at the Algarve Circuit on 15 March.

The season will be the first where competitors use the CFMoto 675SR-R motorcycle and Michelin tyres.
