= Yamaha YZF-R7 (2022 bike) =

Sport bike

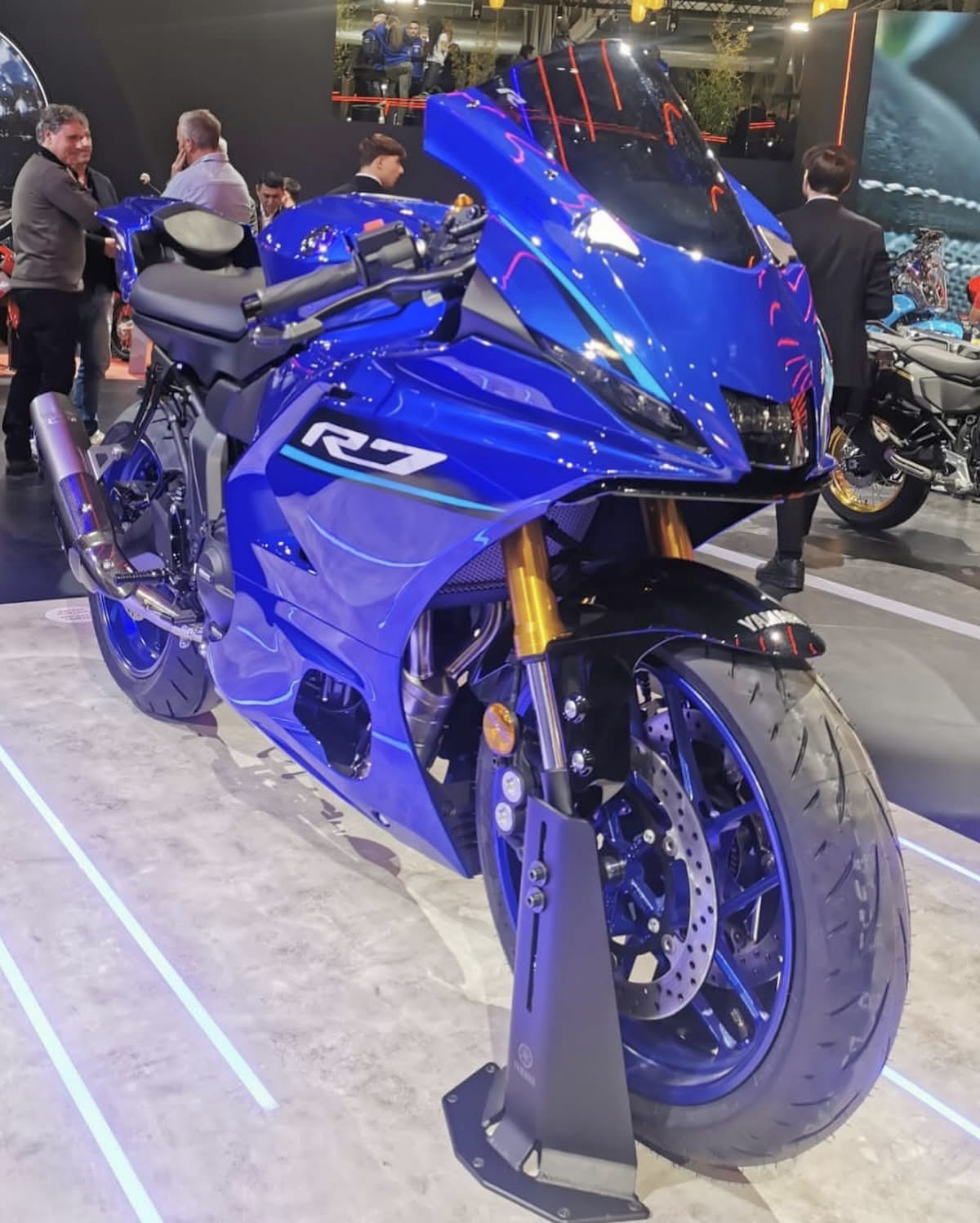
- Manufacturer: Yamaha Motor Company
- Production: 2022–
- Class: Sport bike
- Engine: 689.6 cc (42.08 cu in), liquid-cooled, 4-stroke, 8-valve, DOHC, parallel-twin with 270° crossplane crankshaft
- Bore / stroke: 80 mm × 68.6 mm (3.15 in × 2.70 in)
- Compression ratio: 11.5:1
- Power: 54.0 kW (72.4 bhp) @ 8,750 rpm 35.0 kW (46.9 bhp) @ 7,750 rpm (limited power version)
- Torque: 67.0 N⋅m (49.4 lb⋅ft) @ 6,500 rpm
- Ignition type: Transistor Coil Ignition
- Transmission: 6-gear constant mesh with O-ring chain drive, Wet multi-disc cable-actuated Assist & Slipper clutch, Optional Quick Shift System (upshifts)
- Frame type: Steel Diamond, with Aluminium centre brace
- Suspension: Front: Fully adjustable 41mm KYB Inverted Telescopic forks, 130 mm travel Rear: swingarm with Adjustable KYB single shock absorber, 130mm travel
- Brakes: Front: Ø298 mm Dual Hydraulic disc brakes, Advics 4-pot radial calipers, Brembo Radial Front Master Cylinder; Rear: Ø245 mm Single Hydraulic disc brake, 2-pot Nissin caliper Brembo Rear Master Cylinder
- Tires: Front: 120/70ZR17M/C (58W) Tubeless; Rear: 180/55ZR17M/C (73W) Tubeless
- Rake, trail: 23°40', 90 mm (3.5 in)
- Wheelbase: 1,395 mm (54.9 in)
- Dimensions: L: 2,070 mm (81 in); W: 705 mm (27.8 in); H: 1,160 mm (46 in)
- Seat height: 835 mm (32.9 in)
- Weight: 188 kg (414 lb) (wet)
- Fuel capacity: 13 L (2.9 imp gal; 3.4 US gal)
- Oil capacity: 3 L (0.66 imp gal; 0.79 US gal)
- Fuel consumption: 4.2 L/100 km (67 mpg_{‑imp}; 56 mpg_{‑US})
- Related: Yamaha YZF-R Series

The Yamaha YZF-R7 is a super sport motorcycle based on the MT-07 platform. On May 18, 2021 Yamaha announced the motorcycle, sharing a name with the 1999 YZF-R7 race homologation bike. The 2022 motorcycle is a mid capacity powered by a 54.7 kW (73 hp) liquid cooled four-stroke inline two cylinder double overhead cam 689cc engine. It features forged aluminum pistons with direct plated cylinders integrated with the crankcase.

The R7's reliable crossplane engine's 270 degree crank provides an uneven firing sequence, which is designed to deliver a more characterful note and emphasize torquey acceleration and power delivery. The engine was updated in 2021 to be Euro 5 compliant providing peak output of 73.4 hp at 8,750 rpm and 67 Nm of torque at 6,500 rpm. The Yamaha R7 reaches a top speed of 139 miles per hour.

The 2022 Yamaha R7 model first came in two color options which was Team Yamaha Blue and Performance Black. Later in 2022 Yamaha offered the Yamaha R7 in a special World GP 60th anniversary edition. This motorcycle came in a white color with red and gold accents that was paying respect to Yamaha and their racing program.In 2023 Yamaha removed the World GP 60th Anniversary edition and added the new color Intensity White.
