= Ana Carrasco =

Spanish motorcycle racer

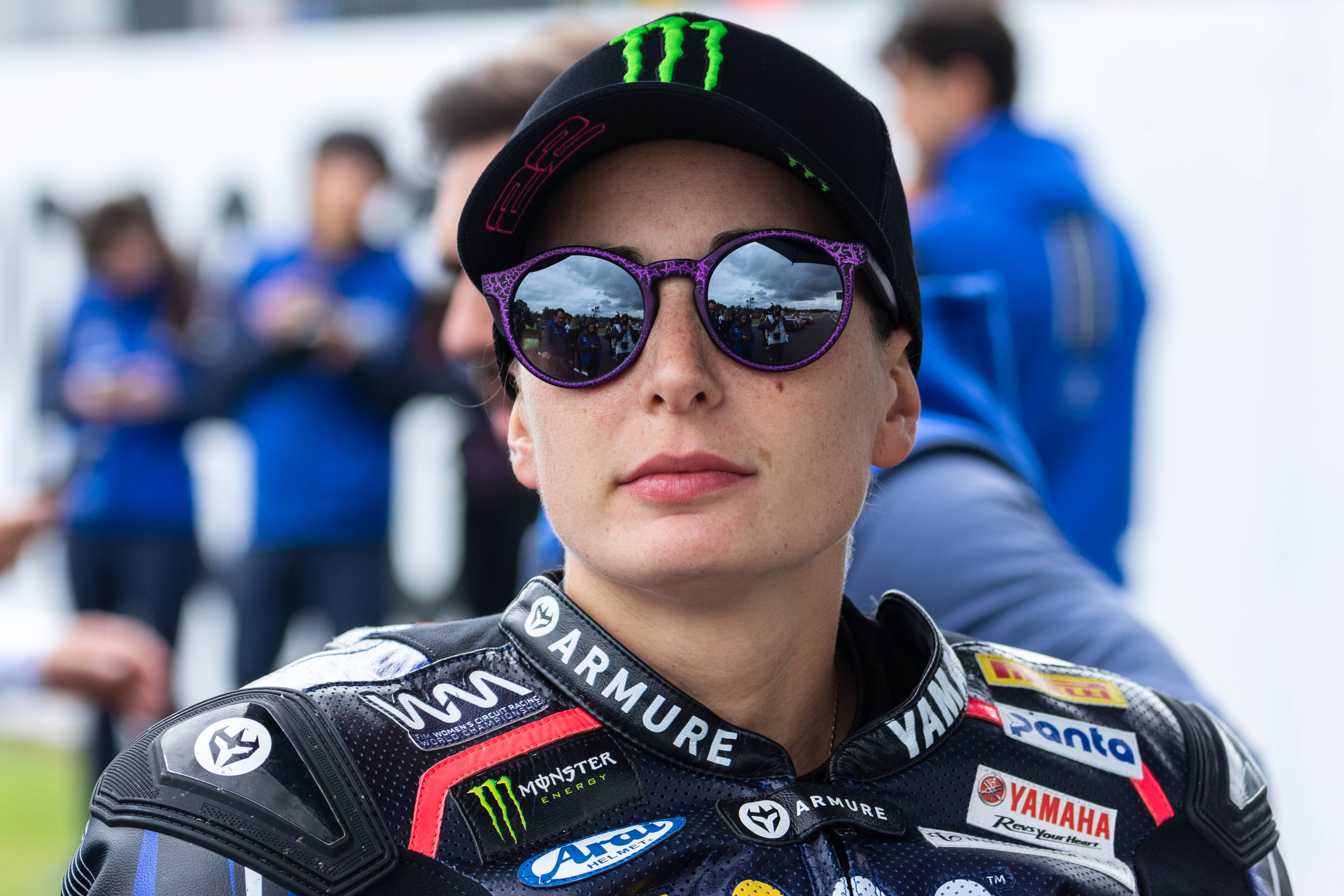
- Ana Carrasco, Donington Park 2024
- Nationality: Spanish
- Born: 10 March 1997 (age 29); Murcia, Spain
- Current team: Honda Racing WorldSSP Team
- Bike number: 22
Motorcycle racing career statistics
Moto3 World Championship
Active years	2013–2015, 2022–2023
Manufacturers	KTM (2013, 2015, 2022); Kalex–KTM (2014)
Championships	0
2023 championship position	35th (0 pts)
Starts / Wins / Podiums / Poles / F. laps / Points; 81 / 0 / 0 / 0 / 0 / 9
Supersport World Championship
Active years	2025–
Manufacturers	Honda
2025 championship position	54th (0 pts)
Starts / Wins / Podiums / Poles / F. laps / Points; 20 / 0 / 0 / 0 / 0 / 0
Supersport 300 World Championship
Active years	2017–2021
Manufacturers	Kawasaki
Championships	1 (2018)
2021 championship position	16 (52 pts)
Starts / Wins / Podiums / Poles / F. laps / Points; 50 / 7 / 12 / 3 / 12 / 420
Women's Circuit Racing World Championship
Active years	2024
Manufacturers	Yamaha
Championships	1 (2024)
2024 championship position	1st (244 pts)
Starts / Wins / Podiums / Poles / F. laps / Points; 12 / 4 / 12 / 2 / 4 / 244

Ana Carrasco Gabarrón (born 10 March 1997) is a Spanish motorcycle racer, currently competing in the 2025 Supersport World Championship for the Honda Racing World Supersport team. She won world-championship titles in the 2018 Supersport 300 series, becoming the first-ever female world champion solo road racer, with a repeat title in the 2024 Women's Circuit Racing series.

Carrasco began riding a minibike at the age of three and was successful in the domestic junior motorcycle racing categories with victories in the 125cc Extremeño Speed Championship and the 125cc Murcia-Pre-GP Championship in 2009. She moved to the FIM CEV International Championship in 2011, becoming the first woman to score points in the series, and switched to the CEV Moto3 Championship the following year.

Carrasco first began competing in the Moto3 World Championship in 2013 for JHK Laglisse. She was the first woman to score points in the series by finishing fifteenth at the Malaysian Grand Prix and repeated the feat with an eighth place at the season-closing Valencian Community Grand Prix. Carrasco moved to RW Racing in 2014, but her season ended early due to sponsorship problems and had an injury-ridden campaign with RBA Racing Team in 2015. In 2016, she struggled in the FIM CEV Moto2 European Championship with Griful, though a switch to ETG Racing in the newly formed Supersport 300 World Championship in 2017 ended with a historic first victory for a woman in a World Championship solo motorcycle race, in the seventh round at the Algarve International Circuit. Carrasco returned to Moto3 for 2022 and 2023, riding on a KTM for BOÉ Motorsports.

== Early life ==
Carrasco was born on 10 March 1997 in the Region of Murcia village of Cehegín in Southeastern Spain. Her family has connections to motorcycle racing: her father Alfonso Carrasco acted as a mechanic for multi Spanish National Champion and 250cc World Championship rider José David de Gea. Carrasco has cited Valentino Rossi and Casey Stoner as the two motorcycle riders she idolises. She was educated at Secondary School Ies Vega del Argos and has combined her studies with her racing career and training. Carrasco played association football, basketball, swimming and tennis during her education years before she stopped partaking in all four sports aged 12 to focus on motorcycling. In September 2015, Carrasco enrolled at the Universidad Católica San Antonio de Murcia to study a law degree.

== Career ==
=== Early career (2001–2012) ===
Carrasco began riding a minibike at the age of three after her elder sister was given it but did not use it. Her first competitive race followed in 2001. Carrasco received early career advice from her father and de Gea though racing was initially her hobby. She attained her first junior category success when she was runner-up in the Bancaja Championship in 2005, and placed second in the Madrid and Andalucia 70cc Territorial Championships the year after. In 2007, Carrasco was twelfth in the 70cc Junior World Championship. She focused on the Murcia 80cc and 125cc Championships in 2008 and was runner-up and third respectively. Carrasco became the first woman to win the five-round 125cc Extremeño Speed Championship in 2009 and followed with the six-event 125cc Murcia-Pre-GP Championship title, the first female to claim the accolade, along with the two-stroke Castrol Cup. She also placed ninth in the 125cc PreGP World Championship. In 2010, Carrasco was fourth in the 125cc Mediterranean Championship and came fifth in the 125cc Motovast Championship.

She began competing in the 125cc category of the FIM CEV International Championship in 2011 after reaching the minimum age in order to become eligible to compete in the series. Carrasco became the first woman to score points in the series by placing 16th at the Circuito de Jerez event. She was 13th in the Drivers' Championship at the end of the season. Carrasco moved to the CEV Moto3 Championship to ride Team LaGlisse's Honda NSF250R for 2012 as preparation for a Moto3 campaign the year after. There, she achieved another feat in Spanish motorcycle racing history by qualifying sixth for the season-opening round at Circuto de Jerez, the highest attained by a female Spanish competitor. Carrasco came seventh in the next day's race. Thereafter, she took two more points finishes with consecutive 11th and tenth-place results at the Circuito de Albacete rounds to rank 19th in the final Riders' Championship standings with 20 points accrued.

=== Moto3 World Championship (2013–2015) ===
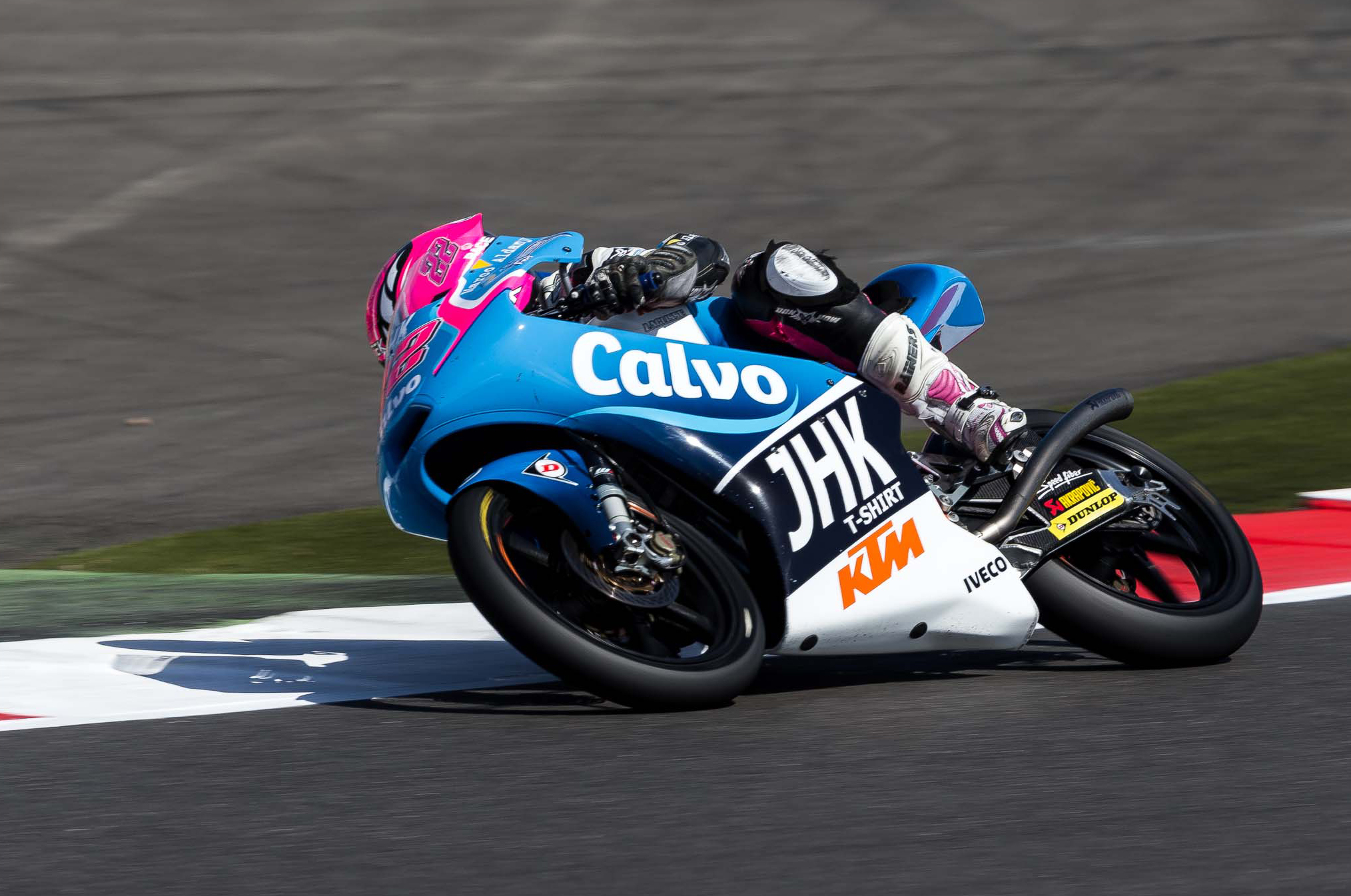
Carrasco practicing at the 2013 British Grand Prix

In November 2012, it was announced Carrasco would join JHK Laglisse on one of their KTM bikes for the 2013 Moto3 World Championship and was the first woman to take part in the category. She set herself the objective of scoring points in the season. Although she struggled to attain consistent good results in her rookie season, Carrasco claimed the first points finish for a woman in Moto3 when she came 15th at the Malaysian Grand Prix at the Sepang International Circuit. The achievement made her the first woman to score points in Grand Prix motorcycle racing since Katja Poensgen in the 250cc category at the 2001 Italian Grand Prix. Carrasco repeated the feat at the season-closing Valencian Community Grand Prix with a category-best placing of eighth. It was the best finish for a female motorcycle rider in all categories since Tomoko Igata took seventh at the 1995 Czech Republic Grand Prix in the 125cc class. She finished her debut season with nine points and ranked 21st in the final Riders' Championship standings.

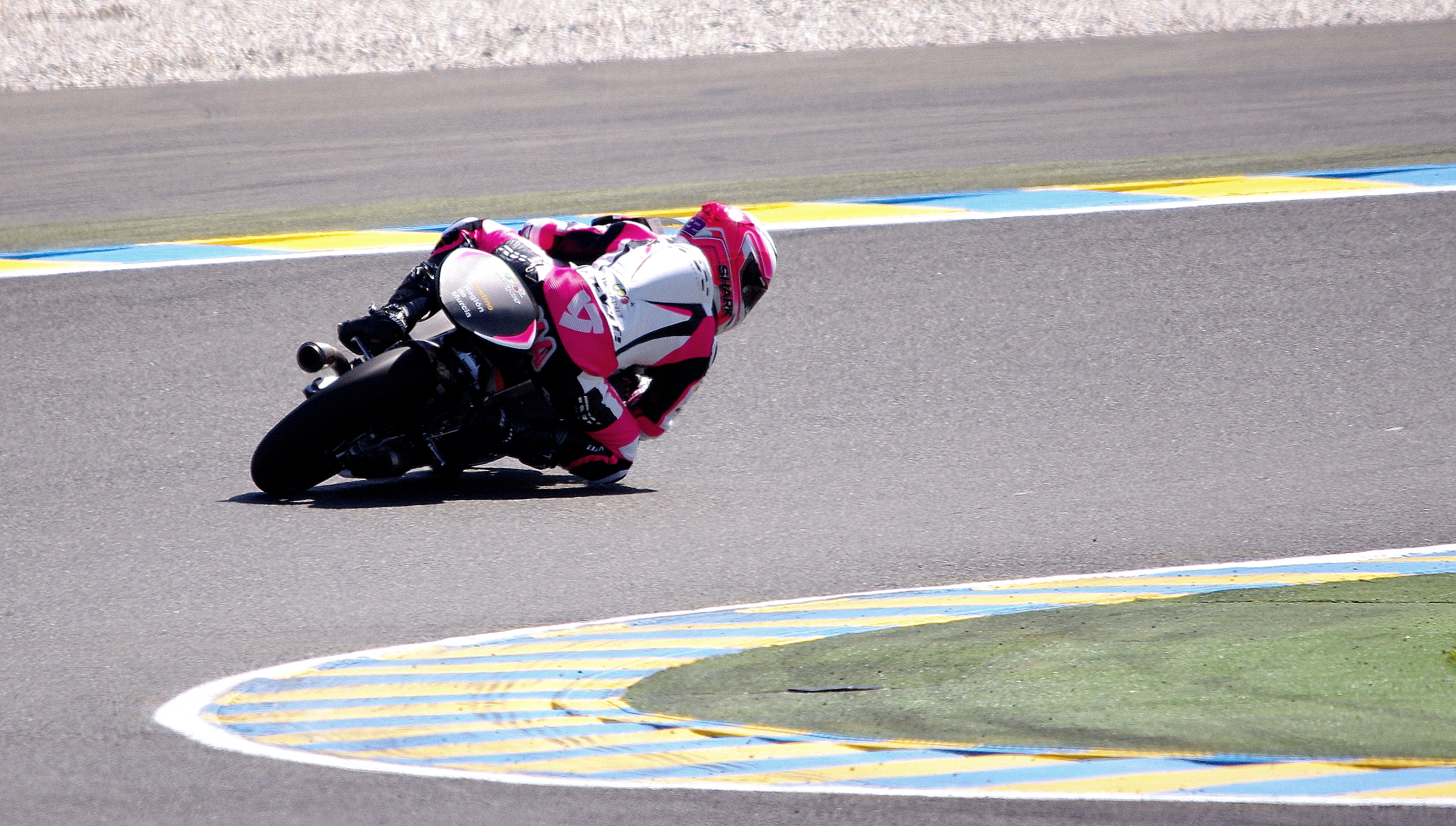
Carrasco competing for RW Racing on its Kalex KTM bike at the 2014 French Grand Prix.

RW Racing announced in December 2013 that Carrasco had signed to ride their Kalex KTM bike for the 2014 Moto3 season. She stated to the press that she aimed to continue scoring points after having a year acquainting herself with new circuits but knew that it would be more difficult in 2014. Carrasco raced in fourteen of the eighteen rounds held over the course of the season but was unable to take part in the final four races of the year due to a lack of funding from sponsors. It came after she was forbidden by RW Racing to mount her bike during the opening practice sessions of the San Marino and Rimini's Coast race due to half of the €250,000 annual entry fee being paid to them. In fourteen rounds, Carrasco's best finish was 20th at the Italian and German Grands Prix and was not classified in the Riders' Championship because she failed to score any points owing to a difficult handling bike.

In late September 2014, she reached an agreement to race for RBA Racing Team in 2015. She rode a year-old KTM bike due to regulation change problems. Carrasco was required to withdraw from the season-opening Qatar Grand Prix because doctors ruled she was not medically fit to compete after fracturing her right collarbone in a pre-season test session accident at the Circuto de Jerez the week before the race. Her place was taken by Loris Cresson. Carrasco came back for the next eight races and had a season-best finish of 18th at the French Grand Prix in May. She injured the top of the humerus in her left shoulder by colliding with María Herrera at the German Grand Prix and was rested for Indianapolis and Brno. Carrasco underwent surgery at Barcelona's Hospital Universitari Dexeus where she had a titanium plate inserted to repair the fracture. It was immobilised for the next two weeks before her rehabilitation began. Carrasco was replaced by Isaac Viñales during her recuperation period. She returned at Silverstone but scored no points in the season's remaining seven races and was unranked in the Riders' Championship.

=== Moto2 European Championship (2016) ===
Carrasco decided not to return to Grand Prix motorcycle racing in 2016 because she did not receive any offers with a competitive team. She switched to the FIM CEV Moto2 European Championship in 2016 and rode the Griful MVR-M2 after more than a month of negotiations with the team. She said that her objective was to win races in the category and enter Moto2 in 2017. Carrasco started from the pit lane at the season-opening race at Circuit Ricardo Tormo and was later disqualified for ignoring instructions from the race director to serve a ride-through penalty. Later in the season, her team switched bike manufacturers from MVR to a 2014 Suter. At the season's conclusion, Carrasco did not score any points and was not classified in the final standings because her best finish in all races she entered was eighteenth at the first Circuit de Barcelona-Catalunya race.

=== Supersport 300 World Championship (2017–2021) ===
Carrasco moved to the newly formed Supersport 300 World Championship for its inaugural season in 2017. She rode a Kawasaki Ninja 300 entered by ETG Racing on a one-year contract with the option for an extension into 2018. Her objective was to do the best of her ability and try to battle for the championship. Carrasco began with a tenth-place finish at the Ciudad del Motor de Aragón race. She continued to ride well thereafter, scoring points in the next five rounds with 26 accrued. On 17 September, Carrasco was running in the top three and overtook two riders by slipstreaming them on the main straight of the Algarve International Circuit on the final lap to become the first woman to win an individual world championship motorcycle race. She claimed one further points finish at the season-ending round at Circuto de Jerez and tied Dorren Loureiro on points with 59 but placed eighth in the championship standings due to her sole victory. In January 2018, Carrasco was issued a Golden Penguin Award for her 2017 campaign.

Carrasco changed teams to ride the DS Junior-entered Kawasaki Ninja 400 in 2018. Carrasco obtained the ride through crowdfunding after sudden budget problems. At the Autodromo Enzo e Dino Ferrari round, she became the first woman rider to secure pole position in the Supersport 300 World Championship and won the race the day after to make herself the first female to lead a World Championship motorcycle racing series. Carrasco repeated both feats at the next round of the season at Donington Park two weeks later to extend her championship lead. After that, she struggled in the next three rounds of the season due to regulations limiting the performance of her bike and the weight limit for the rider and her cycle. Carrasco's nearest rival and teammate Scott Deroue was ten points behind her entering the season-ending race at the Circuit de Nevers Magny-Cours. Deroue retired due to mechanical problems and Carrasco finished 13th, as another championship rival Mika Pérez led the field before Daniel Valle overtook Pérez on the final lap. That gave Carrasco the championship, making her the first woman in history to claim a motorcycle road racing world championship. For her season, she was one of five nominations for the Laureus World Sports Award for Breakthrough of the Year, decided in February 2019.

Before the 2019 season, Carrasco switched to Barcelona-based Provec Racing in conjunction with Kawasaki Motors Europe to again ride the Ninja 400 model. She moved to Barcelona on 8 January to commence a physical training programme, which combined dirt bike and flat track racing with motocross testing. Carrasco began to be advised and mentored by superbike rider Jonathan Rea. She clinched two victories in 2019: the Misano World Circuit Marco Simoncelli and the Circuit de Nevers Magny-Cours races. Carrasco took a further three podium finishes during the season and finished third in the rider's standings with 117 points.

In early September 2020, Carrasco crashed during a test session at Estoril, Portugal, fracturing two thoracic vertebrae and was initially treated in a Lisbon hospital. This ended her competitive riding for the remainder of the season, needing three months of recovery.

For the 2021 season, Carla Grau, a former competitive skier from Bellaterra, Spain, was appointed as Carrasco's team manager. She set the fastest lap in the season opener at Aragón, finishing 11th, and then finished fifth in the second race. She set the fastest lap again at Misano's first race, before winning the second race. She finished in the points eight times during the season, set two fastest laps, and had one race win in Misano, finishing 16th in the final standings, with 52 points.

=== Return to Moto3 (2022–2023) ===
On 2 February 2022, it was confirmed that Carrasco would make her return to Moto3, signing with the Boé Motorsports team for 2022. Gerard Riu was her teammate for the first seven races, and then David Muñoz from Mugello onwards. Carrasco failed to score any points during the 2022 season.

Carrasco stayed at Boé Motorsports for 2023. She broke her tibia and fibula at the Indonesian motorcycle Grand Prix in October.

=== WorldWCR (2024) ===
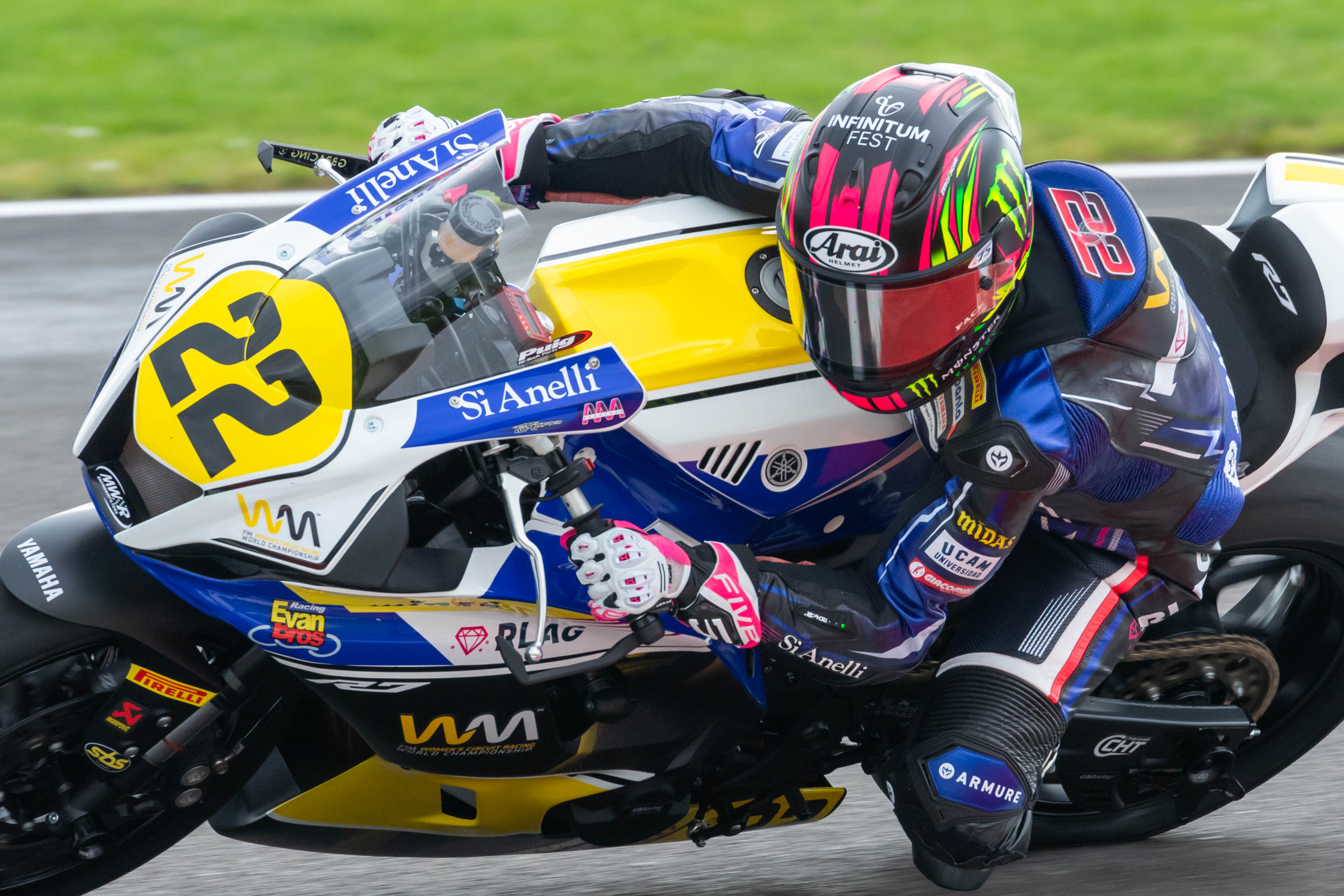
Ana Carrasco, WorldWCR, Donington 2024

Carrasco was announced as participating in the newly-formed FIM Women's Motorcycling World Championship in February 2024 and she established herself as a title contender, topping the two-day test, held at the Cremona racing circuit, Lombardy, Italy. Carrasco won the championship.

=== Supersport World Championship (2025-) ===
Carrasco decided not to defend her WorldWCR crown in 2025, instead moving to the Supersport World Championship, riding for Honda France in the WorldSSP Challenge.

== Career statistics ==
=== CEV Moto3 Championship ===
==== Races by year ====
(key) (Races in bold indicate pole position, races in italics indicate fastest lap)

Year	Bike	1	2	3	4	5	6	7	Pos	Pts
2012	Honda	JER; 7	NAV; Ret	ARA; 16	CAT; 17	ALB1; 11	ALB2; 10	VAL; Ret	19th	20

=== FIM CEV Moto2 European Championship ===
==== Races by year ====
(key) (Races in bold indicate pole position, races in italics indicate fastest lap)

Year	Bike	1	2	3	4	5	6	7	8	9	10	11	Pos	Pts
2016	MVR	VAL1; DSQ	VAL2; 23	ARA1; 20	ARA2; 20	CAT1; 18	CAT2; 23	ALB; 23	ALG1	ALG2	JER	VAL	NC	0
2016	Suter	VAL1	VAL2	ARA1	ARA2	CAT1	CAT2	ALB	ALG1	ALG2	JER; 21	VAL; 23	NC	0

=== Grand Prix motorcycle racing ===
==== By season ====
Season	Class	Motorcycle	Team	Race	Win	Podium	Pole	FLap	Pts	Plcd
2013	Moto3	KTM	Team Calvo	17	0	0	0	0	9	21st
2014	Moto3	Kalex KTM	RW Racing GP	14	0	0	0	0	0	NC
2015	Moto3	KTM	RBA Racing Team	15	0	0	0	0	0	NC
2022	Moto3	KTM	Boé SKX	20	0	0	0	0	0	32nd
2023	Moto3	KTM	Boé Motorsports	15	0	0	0	0	0	35th
Total				**81**	**0**	**0**	**0**	**0**	**9**	

==== By class ====
Class	Seasons	1st GP	1st pod	1st win	Race	Win	Podiums	Pole	FLap	Pts	WChmp
Moto3	2013–2015, 2022–2023	2013 Qatar			81	0	0	0	0	9	0
Total	2013–2015, 2022–2023				**81**	**0**	**0**	**0**	**0**	**9**	**0**

==== Races by year ====
(key) (Races in bold indicate pole position; races in italics indicate fastest lap)

Year	Class	Bike	1	2	3	4	5	6	7	8	9	10	11	12	13	14	15	16	17	18	19	20	Pos	Pts
2013	Moto3	KTM	QAT; 20	AME; 20	SPA; Ret	FRA; 19	ITA; 26	CAT; 22	NED; 29	GER; 24	INP; 17	CZE; 23	GBR; 22	RSM; 19	ARA; 20	MAL; 15	AUS; 19	JPN; 18	VAL; 8				21st	9
2014	Moto3	Kalex KTM	QAT; 24	AME; 21	ARG; 23	SPA; 23	FRA; 22	ITA; 20	CAT; 30	NED; 24	GER; 20	INP; 26	CZE; Ret	GBR; 29	RSM; 24	ARA; 22	JPN	AUS	MAL	VAL			NC	0
2015	Moto3	KTM	QAT	AME; 22	ARG; 26	SPA; 27	FRA; 18	ITA; 25	CAT; 23	NED; 23	GER; Ret	INP	CZE	GBR; Ret	RSM; 25	ARA; 27	JPN; 29	AUS; 18	MAL; 23	VAL; 24			NC	0
2022	Moto3	KTM	QAT; 20	INA; 19	ARG; Ret	AME; 23	POR; 28	SPA; 23	FRA; 27	ITA; 22	CAT; 22	GER; 22	NED; 22	GBR; 23	AUT; 28	RSM; 22	ARA; 25	JPN; 19	THA; 22	AUS; 23	MAL; 22	VAL; 28	32nd	0
2023	Moto3	KTM	POR; 23	ARG; 21	AME; 21	SPA; 22	FRA; 20	ITA; 22	GER; 27	NED; 24	GBR; 23	AUT; 25	CAT; 25	RSM; 27	IND; 19	JPN; 22	INA; Ret	AUS	THA	MAL	QAT	VAL	35th	0

=== Supersport 300 World Championship ===
==== Races by year ====
(key)

Year	Bike	1	2	3	4	5	6	7	8	9	10	11	12	13	14	15	16	Pos	Pts	Ref
2017	Kawasaki	ARA; 10	NED; 7	IMO; 12	GBR; 9	MIS; 14	GER; 12	POR; 1	FRA; 20	JER; 14								8th	59	
2018	Kawasaki	ARA; 6	NED; 4	**IMO**; 1	**GBR**; 1	CZE; 11	MIS; 10	POR; 10	FRA; 13									1st	93	
2019	Kawasaki	ARA; Ret	NED; 8	ITA; C	JER; 3	JER; 3	ITA; 1	GBR; 19	POR; 3	FRA; 1	**QAT**; 5							3rd	117	
2020	Kawasaki	JER; 6	JER; 2	POR; 1	POR; Ret	ARA; 2	ARA; 5	ARA; 4	ARA; 20	BAR	BAR	FRA	FRA	POR	POR			8th	99	
2021	Kawasaki	ARA; 11	ARA; 5	ITA; 15	ITA; 1	NED; Ret	NED; 15	CZE; 24	CZE; 21	FRA; 13	FRA; 11	BAR; Ret	BAR; 29	JER; 20	JER; 18	POR; 15	POR; 21	16th	52	

=== Women's Motorcycling World Championship ===
==== Races by year ====
(key) (Races in bold indicate pole position; races in italics indicate fastest lap)

Year	Bike	1	2	3	4	5	6	7	8	9	10	11	12	Pos	Pts
2024	Yamaha YZF-R7	MIS1; 2	**MIS2**; 3	**DON1**; 1	DON2; 2	ARG1; 3	ARG2; 1	CRE1; 3	CRE2; 1	**EST1**; 1	EST2; 2	JER1; 2	JER2; 3	1st	244

=== Supersport World Championship ===
==== By season ====
Season	Motorcycle	Team	Race	Win	Podium	Pole	FLap	Pts	Plcd
2025	Honda CBR600RR	Honda France WorldSSP Team	20	0	0	0	0	0	54th
2026	Honda CBR600RR	Honda Racing WorldSSP Team	0	0	0	0	0	0*	NC*
Total			**20**	**0**	**0**	**0**	**0**	**0**	

==== By year ====
(key) (Races in bold indicate pole position; races in italics indicate fastest lap)

Year	Bike	1		2		3		4		5		6		7		8		9		10		11		12		Pos	Pts
Year	Bike	R1	R2	R1	R2	R1	R2	R1	R2	R1	R2	R1	R2	R1	R2	R1	R2	R1	R2	R1	R2	R1	R2	R1	R2	Pos	Pts
2025	Honda	AUS	AUS	POR; 30	POR; 26	NED; 24	NED; 23	ITA; 27	ITA; Ret	CZE; DNQ	CZE; DNQ	EMI; 28	EMI; 24	GBR; 26	GBR; 28	HUN; 23	HUN; 23	FRA; 22	FRA; 24	ARA; 28	ARA; 27	POR; Ret	POR; 28	SPA; 26	SPA; 22	54th	0
2026	Honda	AUS	AUS	POR; 27	POR; 27	NED; 27	NED; 31	HUN; 27	HUN; Ret	CZE; 30	CZE; 27	ARA; 27	ARA; 30	EMI; 25	EMI; 31	GBR; 28	GBR; 27	FRA	FRA	ITA	ITA	POR	POR	SPA	SPA	NC*	0*

== See also ==
- Elena Rosell
