= Chloe Jones (disambiguation) =

Chloe Jones (1975–2005) was a pornographic actress.

Chloe Jones may also refer to:

- Chloe Jones (singer) (born c. 1995), contestant on The Voice UK
- Chloe Jones (motorcyclist) (born 2003), English motorcycle racer
- Chloe Cooper Jones, Thailand-born American memoirist, academic, and journalist
- Chloe Jones, a character on A Country Practice
- Chloe Jones, a character on The Path
- "Chloe Jones", a song by Chester French from Jacques Jams, Vol 1: Endurance

== See also ==
- Chloe Jonas, fictional character
