= 2024 Catalan motorcycle Grand Prix =

Motorcycle races in Montmeló

(Catalonia) 2024 Catalan Grand Prix
Race details
- Race 6 of 20 races in the 2024 Grand Prix motorcycle racing season
- Date: 25–26 May 2024
- Official name: Gran Premi Monster Energy de Catalunya
- Location: Circuit de Barcelona-Catalunya; Montmeló, Spain
- Course: Permanent racing facility; 4.657 km (2.894 mi)

MotoGP
Pole position
Rider	(Spain) Aleix Espargaró	Aprilia
Time	1:38.190	
Fastest lap
Rider	(Spain) Pedro Acosta	KTM
Time	1:39.664 on lap 7	
Podium
First	(Italy) Francesco Bagnaia	Ducati
Second	(Spain) Jorge Martín	Ducati
Third	(Spain) Marc Márquez	Ducati

Moto2
Pole position
Rider	(Spain) Sergio García	Boscoscuro
Time	1:41.894	
Fastest lap
Rider	(Spain) Fermín Aldeguer	Boscoscuro
Time	1:42.688 on lap 2	
Podium
First	(Japan) Ai Ogura	Boscoscuro
Second	(Spain) Sergio García	Boscoscuro
Third	(United Kingdom) Jake Dixon	Kalex

Moto3
Pole position
Rider	(Spain) Iván Ortolá	KTM
Time	1:46.749	
Fastest lap
Rider	(Spain) José Antonio Rueda	KTM
Time	1:46.748 on lap 17	
Podium
First	(Colombia) David Alonso	CFMoto
Second	(Spain) Iván Ortolá	KTM
Third	(Spain) José Antonio Rueda	KTM

MotoE Race 1
Pole position
Rider	(Brazil) Eric Granado	Ducati
Time	1:48.215	
Fastest lap
Rider	(Spain) Oscar Gutiérrez	Ducati
Time	1:48.025 on lap 5	
Podium
First	(Spain) Oscar Gutiérrez	Ducati
Second	(Brazil) Eric Granado	Ducati
Third	(Italy) Kevin Zannoni	Ducati

MotoE Race 2
Pole position
Rider	(Brazil) Eric Granado	Ducati
Time	1:48.215	
Fastest lap
Rider	(Spain) Oscar Gutiérrez	Ducati
Time	1:48.076 on lap 4	
Podium
First	(Italy) Kevin Zannoni	Ducati
Second	(Spain) Oscar Gutiérrez	Ducati
Third	(Italy) Alessandro Zaccone	Ducati

The 2024 Catalan motorcycle Grand Prix (officially known as the Gran Premi Monster Energy de Catalunya) was the sixth round of the 2024 Grand Prix motorcycle racing season and the third round of the 2024 MotoE World Championship. All races (except for both MotoE races which were held on 25 May) were held at the Circuit de Barcelona-Catalunya in Montmeló on 26 May 2024.

== Practice Session ==
=== MotoGP ===
==== Combined Free Practice 1-2 ====
Free Practice sessions on Friday and Saturday do not determine riders to qualify for Q2.

Fastest session lap

Pos.	No.	Biker	Constructor	Free practice times	
Pos.	No.	Biker	Constructor	FP1	FP2
1	41	(Spain) Aleix Espargaró	Aprilia	1:40.051	**1:39.294**
2	1	(Italy) Francesco Bagnaia	Ducati	1:40.303	**1:39.306**
3	21	(Italy) Franco Morbidelli	Ducati	1:40.783	**1:39.557**
4	89	(Spain) Jorge Martín	Ducati	**1:39.579**	1:39.609
5	31	(Spain) Pedro Acosta	KTM	1:39.966	**1:39.646**
6	88	(Portugal) Miguel Oliveira	Aprilia	1:40.397	**1:39.681**
7	20	(France) Fabio Quartararo	Yamaha	1:40.493	**1:39.683**
8	25	(Spain) Raúl Fernández	Aprilia	1:40.368	**1:39.700**
9	73	(Spain) Álex Márquez	Ducati	1:40.287	**1:39.764**
10	93	(Spain) Marc Márquez	Ducati	1:39.871	**1:39.773**
11	49	(Italy) Fabio Di Giannantonio	Ducati	1:40.493	**1:39.825**
12	33	(South Africa) Brad Binder	KTM	1:39.958	**1:39.836**
13	43	(Australia) Jack Miller	KTM	1:40.361	**1:39.837**
14	36	(Spain) Joan Mir	Honda	1:40.672	**1:39.911**
15	37	(Spain) Augusto Fernández	KTM	1:40.338	**1:39.952**
16	23	(Italy) Enea Bastianini	Ducati	1:40.689	**1:39.956**
17	12	(Spain) Maverick Viñales	Aprilia	1:40.380	**1:40.013**
18	72	(Italy) Marco Bezzecchi	Ducati	1:40.794	**1:40.079**
19	42	(Spain) Álex Rins	Yamaha	1:40.553	**1:40.154**
20	30	(Japan) Takaaki Nakagami	Honda	1:40.692	**1:40.181**
21	5	(France) Johann Zarco	Honda	1:40.422	**1:40.337**
22	10	(Italy) Luca Marini	Honda	1:40.628	**1:40.538**
23	6	(Germany) Stefan Bradl	Honda	1:41.423	**1:40.675**
OFFICIAL MOTOGP COMBINED FREE PRACTICE TIMES REPORT

==== Practice ====
The top ten riders (written in bold) qualified for Q2.

Pos.	No.	Biker	Constructor	
Pos.	No.	Biker	Constructor	Time results
1	41	**(Spain) Aleix Espargaró**	**Aprilia**	**1:38.562**
2	33	**(South Africa) Brad Binder**	**KTM**	**1:38.634**
3	31	**(Spain) Pedro Acosta**	**KTM**	**1:38.665**
4	1	**(Italy) Francesco Bagnaia**	**Ducati**	**1:38.695**
5	43	**(Australia) Jack Miller**	**KTM**	**1:38.702**
6	89	**(Spain) Jorge Martín**	**Ducati**	**1:38.793**
7	23	**(Italy) Enea Bastianini**	**Ducati**	**1:38.814**
8	21	**(Italy) Franco Morbidelli**	**Ducati**	**1:38.831**
9	42	**(Spain) Álex Rins**	**Yamaha**	**1:39.043**
10	12	**(Spain) Maverick Viñales**	**Aprilia**	**1:39.058**
11	73	(Spain) Álex Márquez	Ducati	1:39.113
12	93	(Spain) Marc Márquez	Ducati	1:39.153
13	88	(Portugal) Miguel Oliveira	Aprilia	1:39.350
14	20	(France) Fabio Quartararo	Yamaha	1:39.352
15	72	(Italy) Marco Bezzecchi	Ducati	1:39.382
16	25	(Spain) Raúl Fernández	Aprilia	1:39.420
17	49	(Italy) Fabio Di Giannantonio	Ducati	1:39.479
18	37	(Spain) Augusto Fernández	KTM	1:39.504
19	5	(France) Johann Zarco	Honda	1:39.558
20	30	(Japan) Takaaki Nakagami	Honda	1:40.028
21	36	(Spain) Joan Mir	Honda	1:40.256
22	10	(Italy) Luca Marini	Honda	1:40.318
NC	6	(Germany) Stefan Bradl	Honda	
OFFICIAL MOTOGP PRACTICE TIMES REPORT

=== Moto2 ===
==== Combined Practice 1-2 ====
The top fourteen riders (written in bold) qualified for Q2.

Fastest session lap

Pos.	No.	Biker	Constructor	Free practice times	
Pos.	No.	Biker	Constructor	P1	P2
1	11	**(Spain) Sergio García**	**Boscoscuro**	1:43.232	**1:41.917**
2	16	**(United States) Joe Roberts**	**Kalex**	1:43.015	**1:41.957**
3	96	**(United Kingdom) Jake Dixon**	**Kalex**	1:43.664	**1:41.993**
4	35	**(Thailand) Somkiat Chantra**	**Kalex**	1:43.926	**1:42.294**
5	18	**(Spain) Manuel González**	**Kalex**	1:43.076	**1:42.310**
6	21	**(Spain) Alonso López**	**Boscoscuro**	1:43.302	**1:42.313**
7	17	**(Spain) Daniel Muñoz**	**Kalex**	1:43.044	**1:42.381**
8	54	**(Spain)** **Fermín Aldeguer**	**Boscoscuro**	1:43.083	**1:42.383**
9	75	**(Spain)** **Albert Arenas**	**Kalex**	1:43.377	**1:42.392**
10	79	**(Japan) Ai Ogura**	**Boscoscuro**	1:43.497	**1:42.393**
11	12	**(Czech Republic) Filip Salač**	**Kalex**	1:43.225	**1:42.415**
12	84	**(Netherlands) Zonta van den Goorbergh**	**Kalex**	1:43.813	**1:42.543**
13	28	**(Spain) Izan Guevara**	**Kalex**	1:43.567	**1:42.561**
14	14	**(Italy) Tony Arbolino**	**Kalex**	1:43.355	**1:42.612**
15	40	(Spain) Arón Canet	Kalex	1:43.102	**1:42.773**
16	81	(Australia) Senna Agius	Kalex	1:43.506	**1:42.866**
17	53	(Turkey) Deniz Öncü	Kalex	1:44.248	**1:42.878**
18	42	(Spain) Marcos Ramírez	Kalex	1:43.617	**1:42.912**
19	52	(Spain) Jeremy Alcoba	Kalex	1:43.826	**1:42.919**
20	9	(Spain) Jorge Navarro	Forward	**1:42.807**	1:42.950
21	7	(Belgium) Barry Baltus	Kalex	1:43.860	**1:42.986**
22	22	(Japan) Ayumu Sasaki	Kalex	1:44.677	**1:42.998**
23	13	(Italy) Celestino Vietti	Kalex	1:44.106	**1:43.005**
24	10	(Brazil) Diogo Moreira	Kalex	1:44.467	**1:43.117**
25	19	(Italy) Mattia Pasini	Boscoscuro	1:43.587	**1:43.244**
26	5	(Spain) Jaume Masià	Kalex	1:44.028	**1:43.277**
27	71	(Italy) Dennis Foggia	Kalex	1:44.446	**1:43.370**
28	15	(South Africa) Darryn Binder	Kalex	1:44.750	**1:43.496**
29	34	(Indonesia) Mario Aji	Kalex	1:44.614	**1:43.653**
30	20	(Andorra) Xavi Cardelús	Kalex	1:44.277	**1:43.712**
31	11	(Spain) Álex Escrig	Forward	1:45.256	**1:43.984**
32	43	(Spain) Xavier Artigas	Forward	1:45.534	**1:44.788**
Source : OFFICIAL MOTO2 COMBINED PRACTICE TIMES REPORT

==== Free Practice session ====
Free Practice session on Friday do not determine riders to qualify for Q2.

Pos.	No.	Biker	Constructor	
Pos.	No.	Biker	Constructor	Time results
1	18	(Spain) Manuel González	Kalex	1:42.860
2	21	(Spain) Alonso López	Boscoscuro	1:43.042
3	96	(United Kingdom) Jake Dixon	Kalex	1:43.044
4	16	(United States) Joe Roberts	Kalex	1:43.320
5	79	(Japan) Ai Ogura	Boscoscuro	1:43.376
6	44	(Spain) Arón Canet	Kalex	1:43.385
7	35	(Thailand) Somkiat Chantra	Kalex	1:43.401
8	3	(Spain) Sergio García	Boscoscuro	1:43.474
9	17	(Spain) Daniel Muñoz	Kalex	1:43.481
10	54	(Spain) Fermín Aldeguer	Boscoscuro	1:43.591
11	13	(Italy) Celestino Vietti	Kalex	1:43.604
12	28	(Spain) Izan Guevara	Kalex	1:43.607
13	14	(Italy) Tony Arbolino	Kalex	1:43.658
14	81	(Australia) Senna Agius	Kalex	1:43.664
15	19	(Italy) Mattia Pasini	Boscoscuro	1:43.687
16	24	(Spain) Marcos Ramírez	Kalex	1:43.702
17	9	(Spain) Jorge Navarro	Forward	1:43.792
18	71	(Italy) Dennis Foggia	Kalex	1:43.963
19	12	(Czech Republic) Filip Salač	Kalex	1:43.977
20	75	(Spain) Albert Arenas	Kalex	1:44.068
21	52	(Spain) Jeremy Alcoba	Kalex	1:44.114
22	7	(Belgium) Barry Baltus	Kalex	1:44.144
23	53	(Turkey) Deniz Öncü	Kalex	1:44.218
24	84	(Netherlands) Zonta van den Goorbergh	Kalex	1:44.417
25	22	(Japan) Ayumu Sasaki	Kalex	1:44.479
26	15	(South Africa) Darryn Binder	Kalex	1:44.563
27	20	(Andorra) Xavi Cardelús	Kalex	1:44.616
28	5	(Spain) Jaume Masià	Kalex	1:44.625
29	34	(Indonesia) Mario Aji	Kalex	1:45.001
30	10	(Brazil) Diogo Moreira	Kalex	1:45.050
31	11	(Spain) Álex Escrig	Forward	1:45.845
32	43	(Spain) Xavier Artigas	Forward	1:46.627
OFFICIAL MOTO3 PRACTICE TIMES REPORT

=== Moto3 ===
==== Combined Practice 1-2 ====
The top fourteen riders (written in bold) qualified for Q2.

Fastest session lap

Pos.	No.	Biker	Constructor	Practice times	
Pos.	No.	Biker	Constructor	P1	P2
1	80	**(Colombia) David Alonso**	**CFMoto**	**1:46.897**	**1:46.111**
2	99	**(Spain) José Antonio Rueda**	**KTM**	1:47.055	**1:46.781**
3	48	(Spain) **Iván Ortolá**	**KTM**	1:47.238	**1:46.893**
4	95	**(Netherlands) Collin Veijer**	**Husqvarna**	1:47.152	**1:46.921**
5	54	**(Italy) Riccardo Rossi**	**KTM**	1:47.919	**1:47.003**
6	82	(Italy) **Stefano Nepa**	**KTM**	1:47.635	**1:47.004**
7	96	**(Spain)** **Daniel Holgado**	**Gas Gas**	**1:47.136**	1:47.761
8	72	**(Japan) Taiyo Furusato**	**Honda**	1:47.718	**1:47.138**
9	71	**(Spain) Adrián Fernández**	**Honda**		**1:47.169**
10	66	**(Australia) Joel Kelso**	**KTM**	1:47.918	**1:47.255**
11	36	**(Spain) Ángel Piqueras**	**Honda**	1:48.444	**1:47.277**
12	78	**(Spain) Joel Esteban**	**CFMoto**	1:47.788	**1:47.282**
13	6	**(Japan) Ryusei Yamanaka**	**KTM**	1:48.018	**1:47.446**
14	22	**(Spain)** **David Almansa**	**Honda**	1:48.552	**1:47.458**
15	7	(Italy) Filippo Farioli	Honda	**1:47.467**	1:47.554
16	58	(Italy) Luca Lunetta	Honda	**1:47.472**	1:47.480
17	18	(Italy) Matteo Bertelle	Honda	1:48.417	**1:47.487**
18	12	(Australia) Jacob Roulstone	Gas Gas	**1:47.536**	1:47.591
19	19	(United Kingdom) Scott Ogden	Honda	1:48.148	**1:47.610**
20	44	(Spain) David Muñoz	KTM	1:47.817	**1:47.619**
21	24	(Japan) Tatsuki Suzuki	Husqvarna	1:48.209	**1:47.671**
22	10	(Italy) Nicola Carraro	KTM	**1:47.675**	1:48.922
23	85	(Spain) Xabi Zurutuza	KTM	1:48.345	**1:47.756**
24	70	(United Kingdom) Joshua Whatley	Honda	1:48.965	**1:48.571**
25	55	(Switzerland) Noah Dettwiler	KTM	1:48.689	**1:48.655**
26	5	(Thailand) Tatchakorn Buasri	Honda	1:49.112	**1:48.952**
27	93	(Indonesia) Arbi Aditama	Honda	1:50.661	**1:49.254**
Source : OFFICIAL MOTO3 COMBINED PRACTICE TIMES REPORT

==== Free Practice session ====
Free Practice session on Friday do not determine riders to qualify for Q2.

Pos.	No.	Biker	Constructor	
Pos.	No.	Biker	Constructor	Time results
1	80	(Colombia) David Alonso	CFMoto	1:46.838
2	48	(Spain) Iván Ortolá	KTM	1:47.138
3	99	(Spain) José Antonio Rueda	KTM	1:47.326
4	6	(Japan) Ryusei Yamanaka	KTM	1:47.788
5	95	(Netherlands) Collin Veijer	Husqvarna	1:47.894
6	78	(Spain) Joel Esteban	CFMoto	1:58.973
7	54	(Italy) Riccardo Rossi	KTM	1:48.125
8	72	(Japan) Taiyo Furusato	Honda	1:48.340
9	64	(Spain) David Muñoz	KTM	1:48.484
10	19	(United Kingdom) Scott Ogden	Honda	1:48.548
11	66	(Australia) Joel Kelso	KTM	1:48.565
12	24	(Japan) Tatsuki Suzuki	Husqvarna	1:48.625
13	31	(Spain) Adrián Fernández	Honda	1:48.653
14	82	(Italy) Stefano Nepa	KTM	1:48.719
15	18	(Italy) Matteo Bertelle	Honda	1:48.829
16	58	(Italy) Luca Lunetta	Honda	1:48.913
17	10	(Italy) Nicola Carraro	KTM	1:48.980
18	96	(Spain) Daniel Holgado	Gas Gas	1:49.067
19	85	(Spain) Xabi Zurutuza	KTM	1:49.141
20	12	(Australia) Jacob Roulstone	Gas Gas	1:49.165
21	7	(Italy) Filippo Farioli	Honda	1:49.340
22	36	(Spain) Ángel Piqueras	Honda	1:49.622
23	22	(Spain) David Almansa	Honda	1:49.793
24	70	(United Kingdom) Joshua Whatley	Honda	1:49.802
25	5	(Thailand) Tatchakorn Buasri	Honda	1:50.431
26	55	(Switzerland) Noah Dettwiler	KTM	1:50.521
27	93	(Indonesia) Arbi Aditama	Honda	1:50.968
OFFICIAL MOTO3 PRACTICE TIMES REPORT

=== MotoE ===
==== Combined Practice 1-2 ====
The top eight riders (written in bold) qualified in Q2.

Fastest session lap

Pos.	No.	Biker	Constructor	Practice times	
Pos.	No.	Biker	Constructor	P1	P2
1	29	**(Italy) Nicholas Spinelli**	**Ducati**	1:49.171	1:48.190
2	51	**(Brazil) Eric Granado**	**Ducati**	1:49.130	1:48.301
3	40	**(Italy)** **Mattia Casadei**	**Ducati**	1:49.507	1:48.319
4	11	**(Italy) Matteo Ferrari**	**Ducati**	1:49.595	1:48.331
5	81	**(Spain) Jordi Torres**	**Ducati**	1:49.587	1:48.346
6	61	**(Italy) Alessandro Zaccone**	**Ducati**	1:49.477	1:48.348
7	99	**(Spain) Oscar Gutiérrez**	**Ducati**	1:49.600	1:48.374
8	4	**(Spain) Héctor Garzó**	**Ducati**	1:49.349	1:48.385
9	21	(Italy) Kevin Zannoni	Ducati	1:49.563	1:48.480
10	34	(Italy) Kevin Manfredi	Ducati	1:49.895	1:48.640
11	72	(Italy) Alessio Finello	Ducati	1:50.343	1:48.760
12	77	(Spain) Miquel Pons	Ducati	1:49.566	1:48.799
13	3	(Germany) Lukas Tulovic	Ducati	1:49.480	2:48.876
14	9	(Italy) Andrea Mantovani	Ducati	1:49.907	1:49.110
15	55	(Italy) Massimo Roccoli	Ducati	1:51.163	1:49.686
16	6	(Spain) María Herrera	Ducati	1:52.858	1:50.636
17	7	(United Kingdom) Chaz Davies	Ducati	1:51.049	1:50.810
18	80	(Italy) Armando Pontone	Ducati	1:53.012	1:52.117
OFFICIAL MOTOE COMBINED FREE PRACTICE TIMES REPORT

== Qualifying ==
=== MotoGP ===
Fastest session lap

Pos.	No.	Biker	Constructor	Qualifying times		Final grid	Row
Pos.	No.	Biker	Constructor	Q1	Q2	Final grid	Row
1	41	(Spain) Aleix Espargaró	Aprilia	Qualified in Q2	1:38.190	1	1
2	1	(Italy) Francesco Bagnaia	Ducati	Qualified in Q2	1:38.221	2	1
3	25	(Spain) Raúl Fernández	Aprilia	1:38.453	1:38.261	3	1
4	33	(South Africa) Brad Binder	KTM	Qualified in Q2	1:38.261	4	2
5	31	(Spain) Pedro Acosta	KTM	Qualified in Q2	1:38.369	5	2
6	49	(Italy) Fabio Di Giannantonio	Ducati	1:38.208	1:38.400	6	2
7	89	(Spain) Jorge Martín	Ducati	Qualified in Q2	1:38.401	7	3
8	42	(Spain) Álex Rins	Yamaha	Qualified in Q2	1:38.692	8	3
9	43	(Australia) Jack Miller	KTM	Qualified in Q2	1:38.763	9	3
10	21	(Italy) Franco Morbidelli	Ducati	Qualified in Q2	1:38.778	10	4
11	23	(Italy) Enea Bastianini	Ducati	Qualified in Q2	1:38.860	11	4
12	12	(Spain) Maverick Viñales	Aprilia	Qualified in Q2	1:38.972	12	4
13	73	(Spain) Álex Márquez	Ducati	1:38.530	N/A	13	5
14	93	(Spain) Marc Márquez	Ducati	1:38.536	N/A	14	5
15	88	(Portugal) Miguel Oliveira	Aprilia	1:38.551	N/A	15	5
16	72	(Italy) Marco Bezzecchi	Ducati	1:38.662	N/A	16	6
17	20	(France) Fabio Quartararo	Yamaha	1:38.705	N/A	17	6
18	5	(France) Johann Zarco	Honda	1:38.978	N/A	18	6
19	37	(Spain) Augusto Fernández	KTM	1:39.120	N/A	19	7
20	30	(Japan) Takaaki Nakagami	Honda	1:39.156	N/A	20	7
21	36	(Spain) Joan Mir	Honda	1:39.524	N/A	21	7
22	10	(Italy) Luca Marini	Honda	1:39.621	N/A	22	8
23	6	(Germany) Stefan Bradl	Honda	1:40.276	N/A	23	8
OFFICIAL MOTOGP QUALIFYING RESULTS

=== Moto2 ===
Fastest session lap

Pos.	No.	Biker	Constructor	Qualifying times		Final grid	Row
Pos.	No.	Biker	Constructor	Q1	Q2	Final grid	Row
1	3	(Spain) Sergio García	Boscoscuro	Qualified in Q2	1:41.894	1	1
2	54	(Spain) Fermín Aldeguer	Boscoscuro	Qualified in Q2	1:42.134	2	1
3	13	(Italy) Celestino Vietti	Kalex	1:42.903	1:42.182	3	1
4	44	(Spain) Arón Canet	Kalex	1:42.882	1:42.193	4	2
5	75	(Spain) Albert Arenas	Kalex	Qualified in Q2	2:17.989	5	2
6	18	(Spain) Manuel González	Kalex	Qualified in Q2	1:42.325	6	2
7	17	(Spain) Daniel Muñoz	Kalex	Qualified in Q2	1:42.328	7	3
8	21	(Spain) Alonso López	Boscoscuro	Qualified in Q2	1:42.328	8	3
9	16	(United States) Joe Roberts	Kalex	Qualified in Q2	1:42.364	9	3
10	79	(Japan) Ai Ogura	Boscoscuro	Qualified in Q2	1:42.439	10	4
11	96	(United Kingdom) Jake Dixon	Kalex	Qualified in Q2	1:42.458	11	4
12	12	(Australia) Senna Agius	Kalex	1:42.608	1:42.623	12	4
13	28	(Spain) Izan Guevara	Kalex	Qualified in Q2	1:42.697	13	5
14	14	(Italy) Tony Arbolino	Kalex	Qualified in Q2	1:42.707	14	5
15	84	(Netherlands) Zonta van den Goorbergh	Kalex	Qualified in Q2	1:42.781	15	5
16	35	(Thailand) Somkiat Chantra	Kalex	Qualified in Q2	1:42.795	16	6
17	12	(Czech Republic) Filip Salač	Kalex	Qualified in Q2	1:42.845	17	6
18	15	(South Africa) Darryn Binder	Kalex	1:43.060	1:43.348	18	6
19	24	(Spain) Marcos Ramírez	Kalex	1:43.086	N/A	19	7
20	19	(Italy) Mattia Pasini	Boscoscuro	1:43.089	N/A	20	7
21	9	(Spain) Jorge Navarro	Forward	1:43.108	N/A	21	7
22	52	(Spain) Jeremy Alcoba	Kalex	1:43.135	N/A	22	8
23	71	(Italy) Dennis Foggia	Kalex	1:43.153	N/A	23	8
24	10	(Brazil) Diogo Moreira	Kalex	1:43.392	N/A	24	8
25	22	(Japan) Ayumu Sasaki	Kalex	1:43.400	N/A	25	9
26	53	(Turkey) Deniz Öncü	Kalex	1:43.481	N/A	26	9
27	34	(Indonesia) Mario Aji	Kalex	1:43.508	N/A	27	9
28	5	(Spain) Jaume Masià	Kalex	1:43.900	N/A	28	10
29	20	(Andorra) Xavi Cardelús	Kalex	1:44.019	N/A	29	10
30	7	(Belgium) Barry Baltus	Kalex	1:44.066	N/A	30	10
31	71	(Spain) Álex Escrig	Forward	1:44.199	N/A	31	11
32	43	(Spain) Xavier Artigas	Forward	1:44.225	N/A	32	11
OFFICIAL MOTO2 QUALIFYING RESULTS

=== Moto3 ===
Fastest session lap

Pos.	No.	Biker	Constructor	Qualifying times		Final grid	Row
Pos.	No.	Biker	Constructor	Q1	Q2	Final grid	Row
1	48	(Spain) Iván Ortolá	KTM	Qualified in Q2	1:46.749	1	1
2	95	(Netherlands) Collin Viejer	Husqvarna	Qualified in Q2	1:46.768	2	1
3	99	(Spain) José Antonio Rueda	KTM	Qualified in Q2	1:47.011	3	1
4	72	(Japan) Taiyo Furusato	Honda	Qualified in Q2	1:47.137	4	2
5	6	(Japan) Ryusei Yamanaka	KTM	Qualified in Q2	1:47.178	5	2
6	80	(Colombia) David Alonso	CFMoto	Qualified in Q2	1:47.299	6	2
7	48	(Spain) David Muñoz	KTM	1:47.873	1:47.395	7	3
8	24	(Spain) Adrián Fernández	Honda	Qualified in Q2	1:47.468	8	3
9	96	(Spain) Daniel Holgado	Gas Gas	Qualified in Q2	1:47.549	9	3
10	58	(Italy) Luca Lunetta	Honda	1:48.192	1:47.563	10	4
11	82	(Italy) Stefano Nepa	KTM	Qualified in Q2	1:47.564	11	4
12	18	(Italy) Matteo Bertelle	Honda	1:47.766	1:47.621	12	4
13	36	(Spain) Ángel Piqueras	Honda	Qualified in Q2	1:47.645	13	5
14	66	(Australia) Joel Kelso	KTM	Qualified in Q2	21:47.989	14	5
15	78	(Spain) Joel Esteban	CFMoto	Qualified in Q2	1:48.039	15	5
16	12	(Australia) Jacob Roulstone	Gas Gas	1:48.296	1:48.054	16	6
17	22	(Spain) David Almansa	Honda	Qualified in Q2	1:48.249	17	6
18	54	(Italy) Riccardo Rossi	KTM	Qualified in Q2	NC	18	6
19	19	(United Kingdom) Scott Ogden	Honda	1:48.557	N/A	19	7
20	7	(Italy) Filippo Farioli	Honda	1:48.683	N/A	20	7
21	24	(Japan) Tatsuki Suzuki	Husqvarna	1:48.752	N/A	21	7
22	5	(Thailand) Tatchakorn Buasri	Honda	1:48.799	N/A	22	8
23	85	(Spain) Xabi Zurutuza	KTM	1:48.876	N/A	23	8
24	55	(Switzerland) Noah Dettwiler	KTM	1:49.204	N/A	24	8
25	10	(Italy) Nicola Carraro	KTM	1:49.220	N/A	25	9
26	70	(United Kingdom) Joshua Whatley	Honda	1:49.406	N/A	26	9
27	93	(Indonesia) Arbi Aditama	Honda	1:50.528	N/A	27	9
OFFICIAL MOTO3 QUALIFYING RESULTS

=== MotoE ===
Fastest session lap

Pos.	No.	Biker	Constructor	Qualifying times		Final grid	Row
Pos.	No.	Biker	Constructor	Q1	Q2	Final grid	Row
1	51	(Brazil) Eric Granado	Ducati	Qualified in Q2	1:48.215	1	1
2	40	(Italy) Mattia Casadei	Ducati	Qualified in Q2	1:48.247	2	1
3	61	(Italy) Alessandro Zaccone	Ducati	Qualified in Q2	1:48.247	3	1
4	29	(Italy) Nicholas Spinelli	Ducati	Qualified in Q2	1:48.413	4	2
5	99	(Spain) Oscar Gutiérrez	Ducati	Qualified in Q2	1:48.525	5	2
6	4	(Spain) Héctor Garzó	Ducati	Qualified in Q2	1:48.644	6	2
7	81	(Spain) Jordi Torres	Ducati	Qualified in Q2	1:48.747	7	3
8	21	(Italy) Kevin Zannoni	Ducati	1:48.365	1:48.797	8	3
9	11	(Italy) Matteo Ferrari	Ducati	Qualified in Q2	1:53.718	9	3
10	3	(Germany) Lukas Tulovic	Ducati	1:48.569	N/A	10	4
11	34	(Italy) Kevin Manfredi	Ducati	1:48.761	N/A	11	4
12	77	(Spain) Miquel Pons	Ducati	1:48.838	N/A	12	4
13	9	(Italy) Andrea Mantovani	Ducati	1:48.988	N/A	13	5
14	72	(Italy) Alessio Finello	Ducati	1:49.159	N/A	14	5
15	55	(Italy) Massimo Roccoli	Ducati	1:49.956	N/A	15	5
16	6	(Spain) María Herrera	Ducati	1:50.592	N/A	16	6
17	7	(United Kingdom) Chaz Davies	Ducati	1:50.655	N/A	17	6
18	80	(Italy) Armando Pontone	Ducati	1:51.535	N/A	18	6
OFFICIAL MOTOE QUALIFYING RESULTS

== MotoGP Sprint ==
The MotoGP Sprint was held on 25 May.

Pos.	No.	Rider	Team	Constructor	Laps	Time/Retired	Grid	Points
1	41	(Spain) Aleix Espargaró	Aprilia Racing	Aprilia	12	20:01.478	1	12
2	93	(Spain) Marc Márquez	Gresini Racing MotoGP	Ducati	12	+0.892	14	9
3	31	(Spain) Pedro Acosta	Red Bull GasGas Tech3	KTM	12	+1.169	5	7
4	89	(Spain) Jorge Martín	Prima Pramac Racing	Ducati	12	+2.147	7	6
5	23	(Italy) Enea Bastianini	Ducati Lenovo Team	Ducati	12	+2.980	11	5
6	49	(Italy) Fabio Di Giannantonio	Pertamina Enduro VR46 Racing Team	Ducati	12	+4.623	6	4
7	43	(Australia) Jack Miller	Red Bull KTM Factory Racing	KTM	12	+8.084	9	3
8	12	(Spain) Maverick Viñales	Aprilia Racing	Aprilia	12	+8.245	12	2
9	72	(Italy) Marco Bezzecchi	Pertamina Enduro VR46 Racing Team	Ducati	12	+8.643	16	1
10	20	(France) Fabio Quartararo	Monster Energy Yamaha MotoGP Team	Yamaha	12	+9.241	17	
11	21	(Italy) Franco Morbidelli	Prima Pramac Racing	Ducati	12	+9.537	10	
12	42	(Spain) Álex Rins	Monster Energy Yamaha MotoGP Team	Yamaha	12	+13.045	8	
13	30	(Japan) Takaaki Nakagami	Idemitsu Honda LCR	Honda	12	+13.199	20	
14	73	(Spain) Álex Márquez	Gresini Racing MotoGP	Ducati	12	+13.378	13	
15	36	(Spain) Joan Mir	Repsol Honda Team	Honda	12	+16.438	21	
16	10	(Italy) Luca Marini	Repsol Honda Team	Honda	12	+18.000	22	
17	37	(Spain) Augusto Fernández	Red Bull GasGas Tech3	KTM	12	+25.262	19	
18	6	(Germany) Stefan Bradl	HRC Test Team	Honda	12	+33.751	23	
Ret	1	(Italy) Francesco Bagnaia	Ducati Lenovo Team	Ducati	11	Accident	2	
Ret	88	(Portugal) Miguel Oliveira	Trackhouse Racing	Aprilia	9	Accident	15	
Ret	5	(France) Johann Zarco	Castrol Honda LCR	Honda	3	Accident	18	
Ret	33	(South Africa) Brad Binder	Red Bull KTM Factory Racing	KTM	6	Accident	4	
Ret	25	(Spain) Raúl Fernández	Trackhouse Racing	Aprilia	4	Accident	3	
Fastest sprint lap: (Spain) Raúl Fernández (Aprilia) – 1:38.991 (lap 4)
OFFICIAL MOTOGP SPRINT REPORT

== Warm up practice ==
=== MotoGP ===
Enea Bastianini set the best time 1:39.505 and was the fastest rider at this session ahead of Pedro Acosta and Maverick Viñales.

== Race ==
=== MotoGP ===
Pos.	No.	Rider	Team	Constructor	Laps	Time/Retired	Grid	Points
1	1	(Italy) Francesco Bagnaia	Ducati Lenovo Team	Ducati	24	40:11.726	2	25
2	89	(Spain) Jorge Martín	Prima Pramac Racing	Ducati	24	+1.740	7	20
3	93	(Spain) Marc Márquez	Gresini Racing MotoGP	Ducati	24	+10.491	14	16
4	41	(Spain) Aleix Espargaró	Aprilia Racing	Aprilia	24	+10.543	1	13
5	49	(Italy) Fabio Di Giannantonio	Pertamina Enduro VR46 Racing Team	Ducati	24	+15.441	6	11
6	25	(Spain) Raúl Fernández	Trackhouse Racing	Aprilia	24	+15.916	3	10
7	73	(Spain) Álex Márquez	Gresini Racing MotoGP	Ducati	24	+16.882	13	9
8	33	(South Africa) Brad Binder	Red Bull KTM Factory Racing	KTM	24	+18.578	4	8
9	20	(France) Fabio Quartararo	Monster Energy Yamaha MotoGP Team	Yamaha	24	+20.477	17	7
10	88	(Portugal) Miguel Oliveira	Trackhouse Racing	Aprilia	24	+20.889	15	6
11	72	(Italy) Marco Bezzecchi	Pertamina Enduro VR46 Racing Team	Ducati	24	+21.023	16	5
12	12	(Spain) Maverick Viñales	Aprilia Racing	Aprilia	24	+22.137	12	4
13	31	(Spain) Pedro Acosta	Red Bull GasGas Tech3	KTM	24	+31.967	5	3
14	30	(Japan) Takaaki Nakagami	Idemitsu Honda LCR	Honda	24	+32.987	20	2
15	36	(Spain) Joan Mir	Repsol Honda Team	Honda	24	+33.132	21	1
16	5	(France) Johann Zarco	Castrol Honda LCR	Honda	24	+34.554	18	
17	10	(Italy) Luca Marini	Repsol Honda Team	Honda	24	+36.689	22	
18	23	(Italy) Enea Bastianini	Ducati Lenovo Team	Ducati	24	+50.615 (Note: Enea Bastianini finished 9th on track, but received a 32-second time penalty for shortcut at the turn 2.)	11	
19	6	(Germany) Stefan Bradl	HRC Test Team	Honda	24	+55.295	23	
20	42	(Spain) Álex Rins	Monster Energy Yamaha MotoGP Team	Yamaha	24	+1:03.428	8	
Ret	21	(Italy) Franco Morbidelli	Prima Pramac Racing	Ducati	17	Accident	10	
Ret	37	(Spain) Augusto Fernández	Red Bull GasGas Tech3	KTM	5	Accident	19	
Ret	43	(Australia) Jack Miller	Red Bull KTM Factory Racing	KTM	2	Accident	9	
Fastest lap: (Spain) Pedro Acosta (KTM) – 1:39.664 (lap 7)
OFFICIAL MOTOGP RACE REPORT

=== Moto2 ===
Pos.	No.	Rider	Constructor	Laps	Time/Retired	Grid	Points
1	79	(Japan) Ai Ogura	Boscoscuro	21	36:33.540	10	25
2	3	(Spain) Sergio García	Boscoscuro	21	+3.816	1	20
3	96	(United Kingdom) Jake Dixon	Kalex	21	+9.186	11	16
4	52	(Spain) Jeremy Alcoba	Kalex	21	+12.241	22	13
5	81	(Australia) Senna Agius	Kalex	21	+12.593	12	11
6	75	(Spain) Albert Arenas	Kalex	21	+13.666	5	10
7	21	(Spain) Alonso López	Boscoscuro	21	+17.676	7	9
8	16	(United States) Joe Roberts	Kalex	21	+20.790	8	8
9	14	(Italy) Tony Arbolino	Kalex	21	+18.885 (Note: 1-position penalty - failing to drop 1 position due to overtaking under yellow flag)	10	7
14	9	(Spain) Jorge Navarro	Forward	21	+21.249	21	6
11	84	(Netherlands) Zonta van den Goorbergh	Kalex	21	+22.435 (Note: 3 seconds penalty for failing to comply with long lap penalty)	15	5
12	12	(Czech Republic) Filip Salač	Kalex	21	+23.073	17	4
13	5	(Spain) Jaume Masià	Kalex	21	+24.540	28	3
14	15	(South Africa) Darryn Binder	Kalex	21	+24.747	18	2
15	34	(Indonesia) Mario Aji	Kalex	21	+24.826	27	1
16	20	(Andorra) Xavi Cardelús	Kalex	21	+27.908	29	
17	19	(Italy) Mattia Pasini	Boscoscuro	21	+30.424	20	
18	11	(Spain) Álex Escrig	Forward	21	+38.261	31	
19	53	(Turkey) Deniz Öncü	Kalex	21	+38.590	26	
20	43	(Spain) Xavier Artigas	Forward	21	+39.214	32	
21	7	(Belgium) Barry Baltus	Kalex	21	+50.605 (Note: 6 seconds penalty for failing to comply with long lap penalty)	30	
22	18	(Spain) Manuel González	Kalex	19	+2 laps	9	
Ret	13	(Italy) Celestino Vietti	Kalex	15	Retired in pits	3	
Ret	54	(Spain) Fermín Aldeguer	Boscoscuro	14	Crashed out	2	
Ret	44	(Spain) Arón Canet	Kalex	14	Crashed out	4	
Ret	17	(Spain) Daniel Muñoz	Kalex	14	Retired in pits	6	
Ret	71	(Italy) Dennis Foggia	Kalex	13	Crashed out	23	
Ret	10	(Brazil) Diogo Moreira	Kalex	1	Crashed out	24	
Ret	35	(Thailand) Somkiat Chantra	Kalex	0	Crashed out	16	
Ret	28	(Spain) Izan Guevara	Kalex	0	Crashed out	13	
Ret	22	(Japan) Ayumu Sasaki	Kalex	0	Crashed out	25	
DSQ	24	(Spain) Marcos Ramírez	Kalex	21	Technical infringement (Note: Marcos Ramírez initially finished 7th, but was disqualified from the Grand Prix after the using a tyre which was allocated to teammate Joe Roberts.)	19	
Fastest lap: (Spain) Fermín Aldeguer (Boscoscuro) – 1'42.688 (lap 2)
OFFICIAL MOTO2 RACE REPORT

=== Moto3 ===
Pos.	No.	Rider	Constructor	Laps	Time/Retired	Grid	Points
1	80	(Colombia) David Alonso	CFMoto	18	32:25.084	6	25
2	48	(Spain) Iván Ortolá	KTM	18	+0.242	1	20
3	99	(Spain) José Antonio Rueda	KTM	18	+0.513	3	16
4	95	(Netherlands) Collin Veijer	Husqvarna	18	+0.560	2	13
5	64	(Spain) David Muñoz	KTM	18	+1.648	7	11
6	96	(Spain) Daniel Holgado	Gas Gas	18	+3.390	9	10
7	58	(Italy) Luca Lunetta	Honda	18	+4.791	10	9
8	12	(Australia) Jacob Roulstone	Gas Gas	18	+7.248	16	8
9	7	(Italy) Filippo Farioli	Honda	18	+7.449	20	7
10	31	(Spain) Adrián Fernández	Honda	18	+7.485	8	6
11	6	(Japan) Ryusei Yamanaka	KTM	18	+8.058	5	5
12	36	(Spain) Ángel Piqueras	Honda	18	+8.104	13	4
13	82	(Italy) Stefano Nepa	KTM	18	+8.147	11	3
14	78	(Spain) Joel Esteban	CFMoto	18	+8.160	15	2
15	24	(Japan) Tatsuki Suzuki	Husqvarna	18	+20.335	21	1
16	19	(United Kingdom) Scott Ogden	Honda	18	+21.297	19	
17	18	(Italy) Matteo Bertelle	Honda	18	+21.359	12	
18	10	(Italy) Nicola Carraro	KTM	18	+21.418	25	
19	85	(Spain) Xabi Zurutuza	KTM	18	+22.327	23	
20	70	(United Kingdom) Joshua Whatley	Honda	18	+40.533	26	
21	55	(Switzerland) Noah Dettwiler	KTM	18	+40.552	24	
22	5	(Thailand) Tatchakorn Buasri	Honda	18	+40.600	22	
23	93	(Indonesia) Fadillah Arbi Aditama	Honda	18	+46.685	27	
Ret	22	(Spain) David Almansa	Honda	12	Retired in pits	17	
Ret	66	(Australia) Joel Kelso	KTM	5	Crashed out	14	
Ret	72	(Japan) Taiyo Furusato	Honda	5	Crashed out	4	
Ret	54	(Italy) Riccardo Rossi	KTM	5	Crashed out	18	
Fastest lap: (Spain) José Antonio Rueda (KTM) – 1:46.748 (lap 17)
OFFICIAL MOTO3 RACE REPORT

=== MotoE ===
==== Race 1 ====
The race, scheduled to be run for six laps, was shortened to five laps.

Pos.	No.	Rider	Laps	Time/Retired	Grid	Points
1	99	(Spain) Oscar Gutiérrez	7	12:44.802	5	25
2	51	(Brazil) Eric Granado	7	+0.131	1	20
3	21	(Italy) Kevin Zannoni	7	+0.414	8	16
4	4	(Spain) Héctor Garzó	7	+0.792	6	13
5	61	(Italy) Alessandro Zaccone	7	+1.602	3	11
6	40	(Italy) Mattia Casadei	7	+2.316	2	10
7	81	(Spain) Jordi Torres	7	+2.349	7	9
8	11	(Italy) Matteo Ferrari	7	+4.115	9	8
9	77	(Spain) Miquel Pons	7	+6.105	12	7
10	55	(Italy) Massimo Roccoli	7	+8.649	15	6
11	34	(Italy) Kevin Manfredi	7	+8.657	11	5
12	72	(Italy) Alessio Finello	7	+8.959	14	4
13	6	(Spain) Maria Herrera	7	+13.545	16	3
14	80	(Italy) Armando Pontone	7	+20.516	18	2
15	9	(Italy) Andrea Mantovani	6	+1 lap	13	1
Ret	7	(United Kingdom) Chaz Davies	4	Accident	17	
Ret	3	(Germany) Lucas Tulovic	2	Accident	10	
Ret	29	(Italy) Nicholas Spinelli	1	Accident	4	
Fastest lap: (Spain) Oscar Gutiérrez – 1:48.025 (lap 5)
OFFICIAL MOTOE RACE NR.1 REPORT

- All bikes manufactured by Ducati.

==== Race 2 ====
Pos.	No.	Rider	Laps	Time/Retired	Grid	Points
1	21	(Italy) Kevin Zannoni	7	12:42.300	8	25
2	99	(Spain) Oscar Gutiérrez	7	+0.474	5	20
3	61	(Italy) Alessandro Zaccone	7	+1:176	3	16
4	81	(Spain) Jordi Torres	7	+4.157	7	13
5	4	(Spain) Héctor Garzó	7	+4.334	6	11
6	3	(Germany) Lukas Tulovic	7	+5.084	10	10
7	9	(Italy) Andrea Mantovani	7	+4.536	13	9
8	11	(Italy) Matteo Ferrari	7	+4.669	9	8
9	77	(Spain) Miquel Pons	7	+4.811	12	7
10	34	(Italy) Kevin Manfredi	7	+7.697	11	6
11	55	(Italy) Massimo Roccoli	7	+7.801	15	5
12	72	(Italy) Alessio Finello	7	+10.480	14	4
13	6	(Spain) María Herrera	7	+10.939	16	3
14	7	(United Kingdom) Chaz Davies	7	+14.215	17	2
15	80	(Italy) Armando Pontone	7	+14.838	18	1
Ret	51	(Brazil) Eric Granado	4	Accident	11	
Ret	29	(Italy) Nicholas Spinelli	3	Accident	4	
Ret	40	(Italy) Mattia Casadei	2	Accident	2	
Fastest lap: (Spain) Oscar Gutiérrez – 1:48.076 (lap 5)
OFFICIAL MOTOE RACE NR.2 REPORT

- All bikes manufactured by Ducati.

== Championship standings after the race ==
Below are the standings for the top five riders, constructors, and teams after the round.

=== MotoGP ===
Riders' Championship standings

Pos.	Rider	Points
1	(Spain) Jorge Martín	155
2	(Italy) Francesco Bagnaia	116
3	(Spain) Marc Márquez	114
4	(Italy) Enea Bastianini	94
5	(Spain) Maverick Viñales	87

Constructors' Championship standings

	Pos.	Constructor	Points
	1	(Italy) Ducati	204
1	2	(Italy) Aprilia	125
1	3	(Austria) KTM	122
	4	(Japan) Yamaha	35
	5	(Japan) Honda	19

Teams' Championship standings

	Pos.	Team	Points
	1	(Italy) Ducati Lenovo Team	210
	2	(Italy) Prima Pramac Racing	170
	3	(Italy) Aprilia Racing	163
	4	(Italy) Gresini Racing MotoGP	156
2	5	(Italy) Pertamina Enduro VR46 Racing Team	104

=== Moto2 ===
Riders' Championship standings

	Pos.	Rider	Points
	1	(Spain) Sergio García	109
	2	(United States) Joe Roberts	90
1	3	(Japan) Ai Ogura	88
1	4	(Spain) Fermín Aldeguer	63
	5	(Spain) Alonso López	63

Constructors' Championship standings

Pos.	Constructor	Points
1	(Italy) Boscoscuro	138
2	(Germany) Kalex	114
3	(Switzerland) Forward	6

Teams' Championship standings

Pos.	Team	Points
1	(Spain) MT Helmets – MSi	197
2	(Italy) MB Conveyors Speed Up	126
3	(United States) OnlyFans American Racing Team	119
4	(Italy) QJmotor Gresini Moto2	94
5	(Italy) Fantic Racing	48

=== Moto3 ===
Riders' Championship standings

	Pos.	Rider	Points
1	1	(Colombia) David Alonso	118
1	2	(Spain) Daniel Holgado	104
	3	(Netherlands) Collin Veijer	75
	4	(Spain) Iván Ortolá	70
1	5	(Spain) David Muñoz	49

Constructors' Championship standings

	Pos.	Constructor	Points
1	1	(China) CFMoto	118
	2	(Spain) Gas Gas	104
	3	(Austria) KTM	97
	4	(Sweden) Husqvarna	85
	5	(Japan) Honda	67

Teams' Championship standings

	Pos.	Team	Points
	1	(Spain) CFMoto Gaviota Aspar Team	153
	2	(France) Red Bull GasGas Tech3	139
1	3	(Spain) MT Helmets – MSi	110
1	4	(Germany) Liqui Moly Husqvarna Intact GP	106
	5	(Spain) Boé Motorsports	91

=== MotoE ===
Riders' Championship standings

	Pos.	Rider	Points
2	1	(Italy) Kevin Zannoni	88
1	2	(Italy) Mattia Casadei	87
1	3	(Spain) Oscar Gutiérrez	86
2	4	(Italy) Nicholas Spinelli	75
	5	(Spain) Héctor Garzó	64

Teams' Championship standings

	Pos.	Team	Points
3	1	(Spain) Openbank Aspar Team	134
1	2	(Monaco) LCR E-Team	130
1	3	(France) Tech3 E-Racing	119
1	4	(Spain) Axxis – MSi	115
2	5	(Germany) Dynavolt Intact GP MotoE	112

== Notes ==
Previous race: 2024 French Grand Prix	FIM Grand Prix World Championship; 2024 season	Next race: 2024 Italian Grand Prix
Previous race: 2023 Catalan Grand Prix	Catalan motorcycle Grand Prix	Next race: 2025 Catalan Grand Prix
