= 2024 MotoE World Championship =

6th running of the MotoE World Championship

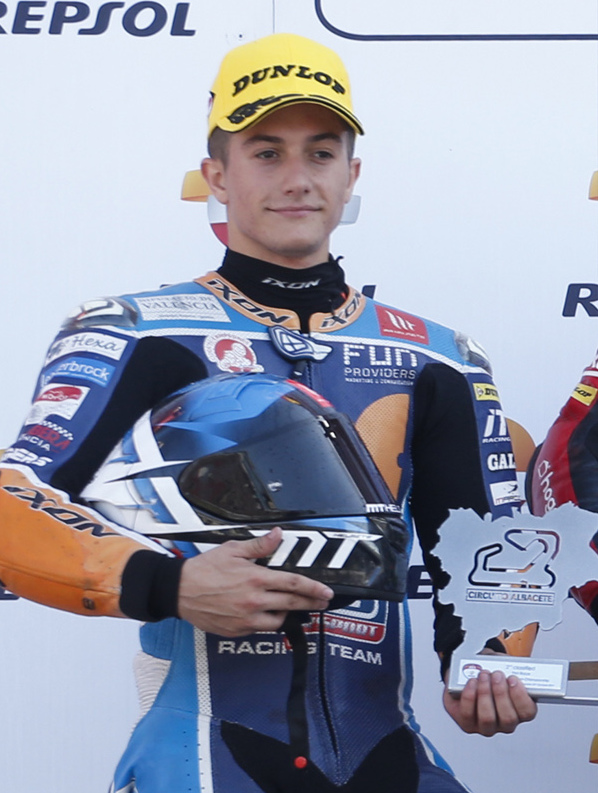
Héctor Garzó (pictured in 2019) was the 2024 MotoE World Riders' Champion.

The 2024 MotoE World Championship (known officially as the 2024 FIM Enel MotoE World Championship for sponsorship reasons) was the sixth season of the MotoE World Championship for electric motorcycle racing and was a part of the 76th Fédération Internationale de Motocyclisme (FIM) Road Racing World Championship season.

Héctor Garzó became MotoE World Champion after finishing fourth in race 1 of the San Marino round.

== Teams and riders ==
All teams used the series-specified Ducati V21L.

Team	No.	Rider	Rounds
(Italy) Aruba Cloud MotoE Racing Team	7	(United Kingdom) Chaz Davies	All
(Italy) Aruba Cloud MotoE Racing Team	80	(Italy) Armando Pontone	All
(Germany) Dynavolt Intact GP MotoE	3	(Germany) Lukas Tulovic	All
(Germany) Dynavolt Intact GP MotoE	4	(Spain) Héctor Garzó	All
(Italy) Felo Gresini MotoE	11	(Italy) Matteo Ferrari	All
(Italy) Felo Gresini MotoE	72	(Italy) Alessio Finello	All
(Switzerland) Klint Forward Factory Team	6	(Spain) Maria Herrera	All
(Switzerland) Klint Forward Factory Team	9	(Italy) Andrea Mantovani	All
(Monaco) LCR E-Team	40	(Italy) Mattia Casadei	All
(Monaco) LCR E-Team	51	(Brazil) Eric Granado	All
(Spain) Axxis – MSi	77	(Spain) Miquel Pons	All
(Spain) Axxis – MSi	99	(Spain) Óscar Gutiérrez	All
(Italy) Ongetta Sic58 Squadra Corse	34	(Italy) Kevin Manfredi	All
(Italy) Ongetta Sic58 Squadra Corse	55	(Italy) Massimo Roccoli	All
(Spain) Openbank Aspar Team	21	(Italy) Kevin Zannoni	All
(Spain) Openbank Aspar Team	81	(Spain) Jordi Torres	All
(France) Tech3 E-Racing	29	(Italy) Nicholas Spinelli	All
(France) Tech3 E-Racing	61	(Italy) Alessandro Zaccone	All

=== Team changes ===
- HP Pons Los40 was replaced by Axxis – MSI.
- Klint Forward Factory Team made its debut in the category.
- Prettl Pramac MotoE withdrew from the championship at the end of 2023. Their grid slot was filled by the new Aruba Cloud MotoE Racing Team.

=== Rider changes ===
- Lukas Tulovic returned to MotoE, replacing Randy Krummenacher at Dynavolt Intact GP MotoE.
- Kevin Zannoni replaced María Herrera at Openbank Aspar Team, leaving Ongetta Sic58 Squadracorse, where he was replaced by Massimo Roccoli that returned to MotoE. Herrera moved to Klint Forward Factory Team.
- Andrea Mantovani moved from RNF MotoE Team to Klint Forward Factory Team.
- Nicholas Spinelli moved from HP Pons Los40 to Tech3 E-Racing, replacing Hikari Okubo.
- Óscar Gutiérrez moved from last year's Prettl Pramac MotoE team to the new team Axxis – MSI.
- Miquel Pons joined Axxis – MSI, leaving LCR E-Team, where he was replaced by Mattia Casadei that moved from HP Pons Los40.
- Former World Superbike rider Chaz Davies and Armando Pontone joined the series with Aruba Cloud MotoE Racing Team.

== Calendar ==
The following Grands Prix took place in 2024:

Round	Date	Grand Prix	Circuit
1	23 March	Grande Prémio Tissot de Portugal	Algarve International Circuit, Portimão
2	11 May	Michelin Grand Prix de France	Bugatti Circuit, Le Mans
3	25 May	(Catalonia) Gran Premi Monster Energy de Catalunya	Circuit de Barcelona-Catalunya, Montmeló
4	1 June	(Italy) Gran Premio d'Italia Brembo	Mugello Circuit, Scarperia e San Piero
5	29 June	(Netherlands) Motul TT Assen	TT Circuit Assen, Assen
6	6 July	(Germany) Liqui Moly Motorrad Grand Prix Deutschland	Sachsenring, Hohenstein-Ernstthal
7	17 August	(Austria) Motorrad Grand Prix von Österreich	Red Bull Ring, Spielberg
8	7 September	Gran Premio Red Bull di San Marino e della Riviera di Rimini	Misano World Circuit, Misano Adriatico

=== Grand Prix locations ===
Location of Grands Prix in 2024.

== Results and standings ==
=== Grands Prix ===
Round	Grand Prix	Pole position	Fastest lap	Winning rider	Winning team	Report
1	(Portugal) Portuguese motorcycle Grand Prix	(Brazil) Eric Granado	(Italy) Alessandro Zaccone	(Italy) Nicholas Spinelli	(France) Tech3 E-Racing	Report
1	(Portugal) Portuguese motorcycle Grand Prix	(Brazil) Eric Granado	(Spain) Óscar Gutiérrez	(Italy) Mattia Casadei	(Monaco) LCR E-Team	Report
2	(France) French motorcycle Grand Prix	(Spain) Héctor Garzó	(Spain) Héctor Garzó	(Italy) Nicholas Spinelli	(France) Tech3 E-Racing	Report
2	(France) French motorcycle Grand Prix	(Spain) Héctor Garzó	(Italy) Nicholas Spinelli	(Italy) Nicholas Spinelli	(France) Tech3 E-Racing	Report
3	(Catalonia) Catalan motorcycle Grand Prix	(Brazil) Eric Granado	(Spain) Óscar Gutiérrez	(Spain) Óscar Gutiérrez	(Spain) Axxis – MSi	Report
3	(Catalonia) Catalan motorcycle Grand Prix	(Brazil) Eric Granado	(Spain) Óscar Gutiérrez	(Italy) Kevin Zannoni	(Spain) Openbank Aspar Team	Report
4	(Italy) Italian motorcycle Grand Prix	(Italy) Alessandro Zaccone	(Italy) Alessandro Zaccone	(Italy) Mattia Casadei	(Monaco) LCR E-Team	Report
4	(Italy) Italian motorcycle Grand Prix	(Italy) Alessandro Zaccone	(Italy) Nicholas Spinelli	(Italy) Kevin Zannoni	(Spain) Openbank Aspar Team	Report
5	(Netherlands) Dutch TT	(Italy) Alessandro Zaccone	(Spain) Óscar Gutiérrez	(Spain) Héctor Garzó	(Germany) Dynavolt Intact GP MotoE	Report
5	(Netherlands) Dutch TT	(Italy) Alessandro Zaccone	(Italy) Alessandro Zaccone	(Italy) Alessandro Zaccone	(France) Tech3 E-Racing	Report
6	(Germany) German motorcycle Grand Prix	(Italy) Alessandro Zaccone	(Spain) Héctor Garzó	(Spain) Héctor Garzó	(Germany) Dynavolt Intact GP MotoE	Report
6	(Germany) German motorcycle Grand Prix	(Italy) Alessandro Zaccone	(Spain) Héctor Garzó	(Spain) Héctor Garzó	(Germany) Dynavolt Intact GP MotoE	Report
7	(Austria) Austrian motorcycle Grand Prix	(Spain) Óscar Gutiérrez	(Spain) Óscar Gutiérrez	(Spain) Óscar Gutiérrez	(Spain) Axxis – MSi	Report
7	(Austria) Austrian motorcycle Grand Prix	(Spain) Óscar Gutiérrez	(Italy) Mattia Casadei	(Spain) Héctor Garzó	(Germany) Dynavolt Intact GP MotoE	Report
8	San Marino and Rimini Riviera motorcycle Grand Prix	(Italy) Mattia Casadei	(Italy) Kevin Zannoni	(Italy) Mattia Casadei	(Monaco) LCR E-Team	Report
8	San Marino and Rimini Riviera motorcycle Grand Prix	(Italy) Mattia Casadei	(Italy) Matteo Ferrari	(Spain) Óscar Gutiérrez	(Spain) Axxis – MSi	Report

=== Riders' standings ===
Scoring system

Points were awarded to the top fifteen finishers. A rider had to finish the race to earn points.

Position	1st	2nd	3rd	4th	5th	6th	7th	8th	9th	10th	11th	12th	13th	14th	15th
Points	25	20	16	13	11	10	9	8	7	6	5	4	3	2	1

Pos.	Rider	Team	POR (Portugal)		FRA (France)		CAT (Catalonia)		ITA (Italy)		NED (Netherlands)		GER (Germany)		AUT (Austria)		RSM (San Marino)		Pts
1	(Spain) Héctor Garzó	Dynavolt Intact GP MotoE	2	2	Ret^{P F}	Ret^{P}	4	5	3	8	1	3	1^{F}	1^{F}	2	1	4	7	246
2	(Italy) Mattia Casadei	LCR E-Team	3	1	3	2	6	Ret	1	2	Ret	8	9	9	3	3^{F}	1^{P}	2^{P}	231
3	(Spain) Óscar Gutiérrez	Axxis – MSi	Ret	3^{F}	7	3	1^{F}	2^{F}	11	10	2^{F}	2	Ret	4	1^{P F}	Ret^{P}	8	1	208
4	(Italy) Kevin Zannoni	Openbank Aspar Team	5	7	2	9	3	1	4	1	13	7	8	15	4	2	Ret^{F}	5	191
5	(Italy) Alessandro Zaccone	Tech3 E-Racing	Ret^{F}	12	Ret	4	5	3	2^{P F}	6^{P}	DSQ^{P}	1^{P}	2^{P}	5^{P}	6	5	2	8	179
6	(Spain) Jordi Torres	Openbank Aspar Team	Ret	5	4	Ret	7	4	Ret	12	3	5	5	3	5	4	5	4	152
7	(Italy) Nicholas Spinelli	Tech3 E-Racing	1	Ret	1	1^{F}	Ret	Ret	10	9^{F}	Ret	Ret	3	2	11	8	9	11	149
8	(Italy) Matteo Ferrari	Felo Gresini MotoE	12	8	8	8	8	8	8	7	5	9	4	6	Ret	6	6	6^{F}	132
9	(Italy) Andrea Mantovani	Klint Forward Factory Team	7	9	5	5	15	7	6	5	NC	14	11	8	7	9	10	9	113
10	(Brazil) Eric Granado	LCR E-Team	Ret^{P}	4^{P}	6	Ret	2^{P}	Ret^{P}	5	3	Ret	12	Ret	DNS	Ret	10	3	3	112
11	(Germany) Lukas Tulovic	Dynavolt Intact GP MotoE	4	6	11	6	Ret	6	DNS	DNS	7	4	7	10	8	7	7	17	111
12	(Spain) Miquel Pons	Axxis – MSi	Ret	11	15	7	9	9	9	11	4	6	6	7	Ret	Ret	11	10	94
13	(Italy) Massimo Roccoli	Ongetta Sic58 Squadra Corse	6	10	Ret	13	10	11	7	4	6	10	13	11	9	11	Ret	DNS	88
14	(Italy) Alessio Finello	Felo Gresini MotoE	13	13	9	10	12	12	12	13	8	11	10	14	12	13	12	12	70
15	(Italy) Kevin Manfredi	Ongetta Sic58 Squadra Corse	8	14	10	11	11	10	13	14	10	15	15	13	14	15	13	14	56
16	(Spain) María Herrera	Klint Forward Factory Team	11	17	14	14	13	13	15	17	11	13	12	17	10	12	14	13	43
17	(United Kingdom) Chaz Davies	Aruba Cloud MotoE Racing Team	9	15	13	12	Ret	14	14	16	9	Ret	14	16	13	14	15	15	35
18	(Italy) Armando Pontone	Aruba Cloud MotoE Racing Team	10	16	12	Ret	14	15	16	15	12	16	Ret	12	15	16	16	16	23
Pos.	Rider	Team	POR (Portugal)		FRA (France)		CAT (Catalonia)		ITA (Italy)		NED (Netherlands)		GER (Germany)		AUT (Austria)		RSM (San Marino)		Pts

Race key
Colour	Result
Gold	Winner
Silver	2nd place
Bronze	3rd place
Green	Points finish
Blue	Non-points finish
Blue	Non-classified finish (NC)
Purple	Retired (Ret)
Red	Did not qualify (DNQ)
Black	Disqualified (DSQ)
White	Did not start (DNS)
White	Withdrew (WD)
White	Race cancelled (C)
Blank	Did not practice (DNP)
Blank	Excluded (EX)
Blank	Did not arrive (DNA)
Blank	Did not enter (empty cell)
Annotation	Meaning
P	Pole position
F	Fastest lap
Rider key
Colour	Meaning
Light blue	Rookie rider

=== Teams' standings ===
The teams' standings were based on results obtained by regular and substitute riders.

Pos.	Team	Bike No.	POR (Portugal)		FRA (France)		CAT (Catalonia)		ITA (Italy)		NED (Netherlands)		GER (Germany)		AUT (Austria)		RSM (San Marino)		Pts
1	(Germany) Dynavolt Intact GP MotoE	3	4	6	11	6	Ret	6	DNS	DNS	7	4	7	10	8	7	7	17	357
1	(Germany) Dynavolt Intact GP MotoE	4	2	2	Ret^{P F}	Ret^{P}	4	5	3	8	1	3	1^{F}	1^{F}	2	1	4	7	357
2	(Monaco) LCR E-Team	40	3	1	3	2	6	Ret	1	2	Ret	8	9	9	3	3^{F}	1^{P}	2^{P}	343
2	(Monaco) LCR E-Team	51	Ret^{P}	4^{P}	6	Ret	2^{P}	Ret^{P}	5	3	Ret	12	DNS	DNS	Ret	10	3	3	343
3	(Spain) Openbank Aspar Team	21	5	7	2	9	3	1	4	1	13	7	8	15	4	2	Ret^{F}	5	343
3	(Spain) Openbank Aspar Team	81	Ret	5	4	Ret	7	4	Ret	12	3	5	5	3	5	4	5	4	343
4	(France) Tech3 E-Racing	29	1	Ret	1	1^{F}	Ret	Ret	10	9^{F}	Ret	Ret	3	2	11	8	9	11	328
4	(France) Tech3 E-Racing	61	Ret^{F}	12	Ret	4	5	3	2^{P F}	6^{P}	DSQ^{P}	1^{P F}	2^{P}	5^{P}	6	5	2	8	328
5	(Spain) Axxis – MSi	77	Ret	11	15	9	9	9	9	11	4	6	6	7	Ret	Ret	11	10	302
5	(Spain) Axxis – MSi	99	Ret	3^{F}	7	3	1^{F}	2^{F}	11	10	2^{F}	2	Ret	4	1^{P F}	Ret^{P}	8	1	302
6	(Italy) Felo Gresini MotoE	11	12	8	8	8	8	8	8	7	5	9	4	6	Ret	6	6	6^{F}	202
6	(Italy) Felo Gresini MotoE	72	13	13	9	10	12	12	12	13	8	11	10	14	12	13	12	12	202
7	(Switzerland) Klint Forward Factory Team	6	11	17	14	14	13	13	15	17	11	13	12	17	10	12	14	13	156
7	(Switzerland) Klint Forward Factory Team	9	7	9	5	5	15	7	6	5	NC	14	11	8	7	9	10	9	156
8	(Italy) Ongetta Sic58 Squadra Corse	34	8	14	10	11	11	10	13	14	10	15	15	13	14	15	13	14	144
8	(Italy) Ongetta Sic58 Squadra Corse	55	6	10	Ret	13	10	11	7	4	6	10	13	11	9	11	Ret	DNS	144
9	(Italy) Aruba Cloud MotoE Racing Team	7	9	15	13	12	Ret	14	14	16	9	Ret	14	16	13	14	15	15	58
9	(Italy) Aruba Cloud MotoE Racing Team	80	10	16	12	Ret	14	15	16	15	12	16	DNS	12	15	16	16	16	58
Pos.	Team	Bike No.	POR (Portugal)		FRA (France)		CAT (Catalonia)		ITA (Italy)		NED (Netherlands)		GER (Germany)		AUT (Austria)		RSM (San Marino)		Pts
