= 2024 FIM Women's Circuit Racing World Championship =

Racing competition

2024 FIM Women's Circuit Racing World Championship
Previous:	none	Next:	2025
Support series: Superbike World Championship; Supersport World Championship; Supersport 300 World Championship; Yamaha R3 bLU cRU FIM World Cup

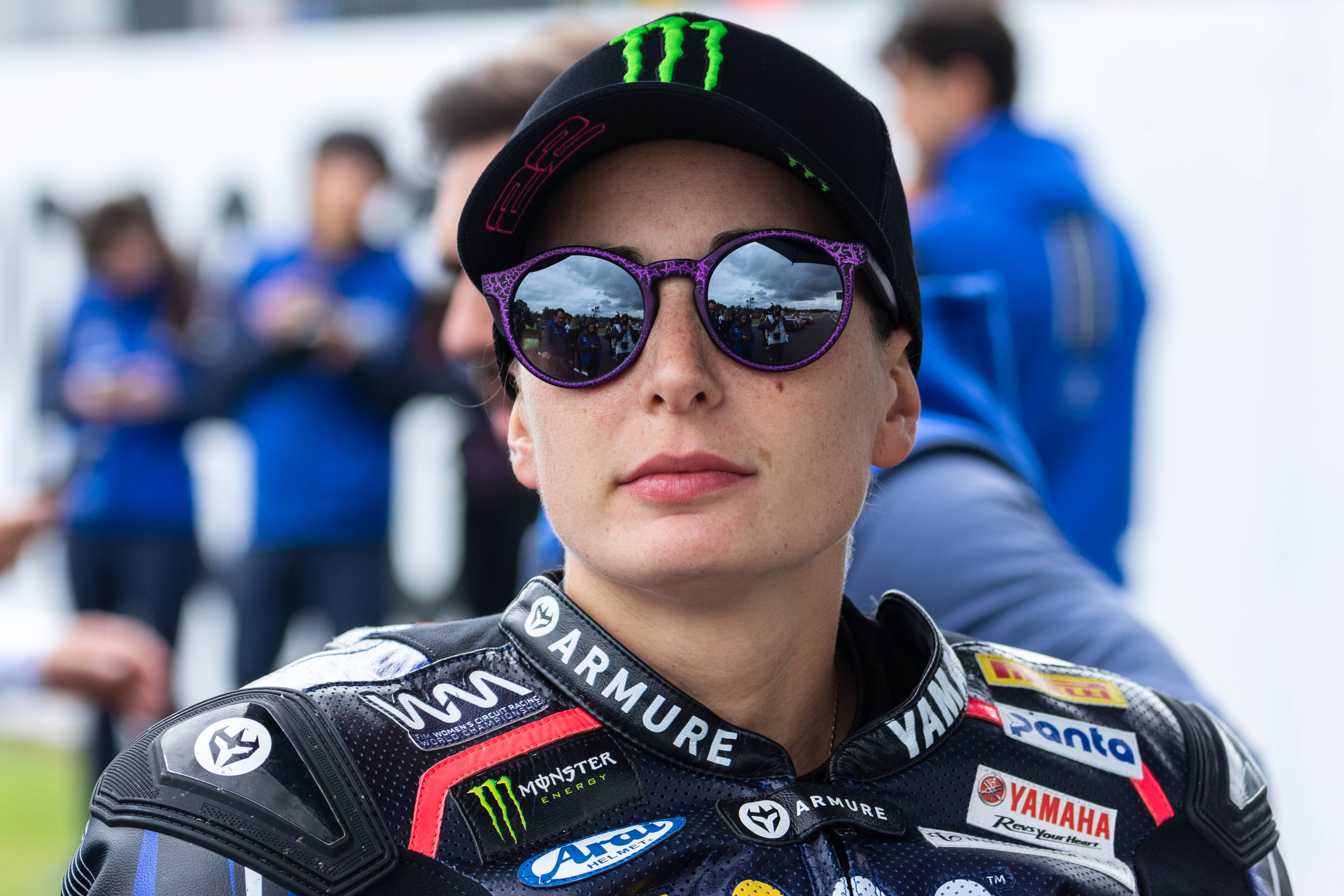
Ana Carrasco, (pictured in 2024), was the 2024 FIM Women's Circuit Racing World Champion.

The 2024 FIM Women's Circuit Racing World Championship was the inaugural season of the FIM Women's Circuit Racing World Championship (WorldWCR). It is the premier female only circuit racing series. Riders competed on identical Yamaha YZF-R7 motorcycles. The 6 rounds were run as support races for the European rounds of the Superbike World Championship. Format of each round was a Superpole qualifying session on Friday, Race 1 on Saturday and Race 2 on Sunday. The championship was won by Ana Carrasco.

== Entry list ==
A provisional entry list for the Women's Circuit Racing World Championship (WorldWCR) was released in February, with 24 participants selected from an initial 40-plus entries.

On 3 June, María Herrera was announced as an entry to the championship.

2024 entry list
Team	No	Rider	Rounds
(Italy) 511 Terra&Vita Racing Team	10	(Israel) Ran Yochay	All
(Italy) 511 Terra&Vita Racing Team	64	(Spain) Sara Sánchez	All
(Italy) AD78 FIM Latinoamerica by Team GP3	99	(Chile) Isis Carreno	1, 5-6
(United Kingdom) Ampito/Pata Prometeon Yamaha	36	(Spain) Beatriz Neila	All
(South Africa) Andalaft Racing	21	(South Africa) Nicole Van Aswegen	1–3
(Austria) Bertl K. Racing	35	(Austria) Lena Kemmer	All
(United Kingdom) Carl Cox Motor Sports	50	(New Zealand) Avalon Lewis	4
(Czech Republic) DafitMotoracing	19	(Czech Republic) Adela Ourednickova	All
(Spain) Deza - Box 77 Racing Team	77	(Spain) Andrea Sibaja	All
(Italy) Evan Bros Racing Yamaha Team	22	(Spain) Ana Carrasco	All
(United Kingdom) GR Motosport	51	(United Kingdom) Chloe Jones	6
(Mexico) ITALIKA Racing FIMLA	15	(Colombia) Sarah Varon	3-6
(Mexico) ITALIKA Racing FIMLA	83	(Mexico) Astrid Madrigal	All
(Mexico) ITALIKA Racing FIMLA	5	(Dominican Republic) Krystal Silfa (Note: Sarah Varon was injured pre-season and was replaced by Krystal Silfa)	1–2
(Switzerland) Klint Forward Factory Team	6	(Spain) María Herrera	All
(United States) Lloyd Motorsports	32	(United States) Sonya Lloyd	6
(Ukraine) MPS.RT	53	(Ukraine) Iryna Nadieieva	1, 3-4
(Spain) PS Racing Team 46+1	46	(Spain) Pakita Ruiz	All
(Portugal) RP27	27	(Portugal) Rafaela Peixoto	5
(Norway) Rusthen Racing	29	(Norway) Mia Rusthen	1
(United Kingdom) Sekhmet Motorcycle Racing Team	14	(United States) Mallory Dobbs	All
(United Kingdom) Sekhmet Motorcycle Racing Team	34	(United Kingdom) Alyssia Whitmore	1–2, 4
(United Kingdom) Sekhmet Motorcycle Racing Team	76	(United Kingdom) Jamie Hanks-Elliott (Note: Hanks-Elliott replaced Alyssia Whitmore who was recovering from a fractured wrist sustained during Round 2 at Donington Park.)	3, 5–6
(Australia) TAYCO Motorsport	8	(Australia) Tayla Relph	All
(Italy) Team GP3 AD11 BY TIRSO	94	(Italy) Beatrice Barbera	1
(Japan) Team Luna	44	(Japan) Luna Hirano	All
(Italy) Team Roc'n'dea - De Angelis Team	25	(Italy) Irene Bramato	4
(Italy) Team Trasimeno	52	(South Africa) Jessica Howden	1, 3-6
(Germany) TSL-Racing	16	(Germany) Lucy Michel	All
WT Racing Team Taiwan	33	(Chinese Taipei) Chun Mei Liu	1–5
(Italy) Yamaha Motoxracing WCR Team	28	(France) Ornella Ongaro	All
(Italy) Yamaha Motoxracing WCR Team	96	(Italy) Roberta Ponziani	All
(Belgium) YART Zelos Black Knights Team	4	(France) Emily Bondi	All

Key
Regular rider
Wildcard rider
Replacement rider

== Race calendar and results ==
The initial schedule included Balaton Park Circuit, Hungary on 23–25 August, but this was later dropped as track improvements would not be completed on time, with Circuito do Estoril, Portugal added on 11–13 October. Scheduled rounds are:

2024 calendar and results
Round			Circuit	Date	Pole position (Note: Pole for race one set by Superpole, pole for Race 2 set by fastest lap in Race 1)	Fastest lap	Winning rider	Winning team	Ref
1	R1	Emilia-Romagna Round	Misano World Circuit Marco Simoncelli	15 June	(Spain) María Herrera	(Spain) Ana Carrasco	(Spain) María Herrera	(Switzerland) Klint Forward Factory Team	
1	R2	Emilia-Romagna Round	Misano World Circuit Marco Simoncelli	16 June		(Spain) Beatriz Neila	(Spain) María Herrera	(Switzerland) Klint Forward Factory Team	
2	R1	(United Kingdom) UK Round	Donington Park	13 July	(Spain) Ana Carrasco	(Spain) Beatriz Neila	(Spain) Ana Carrasco	(Italy) Evan Bros Racing Yamaha Team	
2	R2	(United Kingdom) UK Round	Donington Park	14 July		(Spain) Ana Carrasco	(Spain) María Herrera	(Switzerland) Klint Forward Factory Team	
3	R1	(Portugal) Portuguese Round	Algarve International Circuit	10 August	(Spain) María Herrera	(Spain) Sara Sánchez	(Spain) María Herrera	(Switzerland) Klint Forward Factory Team	
3	R2	(Portugal) Portuguese Round	Algarve International Circuit	11 August		(Spain) Sara Sánchez	(Spain) Ana Carrasco	(Italy) Evan Bros Racing Yamaha Team	
4	R1	(Italy) Italian Round (Note: Subject to homologation)	Cremona Circuit	21 September	(Spain) María Herrera	(Italy) Roberta Ponziani	(Spain) María Herrera	(Switzerland) Klint Forward Factory Team	
4	R2	(Italy) Italian Round	Cremona Circuit	22 September		(Spain) Ana Carrasco	(Spain) Ana Carrasco	(Italy) Evan Bros Racing Yamaha Team	
5	R1	(Portugal) Estoril Round (Note: The Estoril round was added to the calendar on 7 June 2024. It replaced the Hungarian round.)	Circuito do Estoril	12 October	(Spain) Ana Carrasco	(Spain) Sara Sánchez	(Spain) Ana Carrasco	(Italy) Evan Bros Racing Yamaha Team	
5	R2	(Portugal) Estoril Round	Circuito do Estoril	13 October		(Spain) Ana Carrasco	(Spain) Sara Sánchez	(Italy) 511 Terra&Vita Racing Team	
6	R1	(Spain) Spanish Round	Circuito de Jerez	19 October	(Spain) Sara Sánchez	(Spain) Sara Sánchez	(Spain) María Herrera	(Switzerland) Klint Forward Factory Team	
6	R2	(Spain) Spanish Round	Circuito de Jerez	20 October		(Spain) María Herrera	(Spain) Sara Sánchez	(Italy) 511 Terra&Vita Racing Team	

=== Testing ===
A two-day test was held at the Cremona racing circuit, Lombardy, Italy, on 16 & 17 May. 2018 Supersport 300 World Champion Ana Carrasco set the fastest time.

== Championship standings ==
Points system
Position	1	2	3	4	5	6	7	8	9	10	11	12	13	14	15
Points	25	20	16	13	11	10	9	8	7	6	5	4	3	2	1

Pos.	Rider	MIS (Emilia-Romagna)		DON (United Kingdom)		ALG (Portugal)		CRE (Italy)		EST (Portugal)		JER (Spain)		Pts.
1	(Spain) Ana Carrasco	2	**3**	**1**	2	3	1	3	1	**1**	2	2	3	244
2	(Spain) María Herrera	**1**	1	4	1	**1**	3	**1**	Ret	2	3	1	NC	215
3	(Spain) Sara Sánchez	3	2	3	3	2	**2**	2	Ret	4	**1**	**Ret**	**1**	191
4	(Spain) Beatriz Neila	5	4	2	**4**	4	4	5	4	3	4	3	2	172
5	(Italy) Roberta Ponziani	4	5	5	Ret	6	5	4	**2**	7	5	4	4	135
6	(Spain) Pakita Ruiz	10	9	8	8	5	6	6	6	6	6	5	5	112
7	(Australia) Tayla Relph	Ret	12	9	6	8	Ret	7	3	5	Ret	7	7	83
8	(Mexico) Astrid Madrigal	12	Ret	13	13	10	7	9	7	9	8	13	15	60
9	(Israel) Ran Yochay	8	8	6	5	15	12	16	13	15	13	11	14	56
10	(France) Ornella Ongaro	Ret	7	7	Ret	13	8	12	9	14	12	12	11	55
11	(United States) Mallory Dobbs	Ret	15	17	Ret	Ret	9	10	Ret	8	7	9	9	45
12	(Chile) Isis Carreno	6	6							13	9	10	10	42
13	(Czech Republic) Adela Ourednickova	13	14	11	10	14	13	15	11	10	10	Ret	16	39
14	(Chinese Taipei) Chun Mei Liu	7	Ret	10	Ret	12	11	13	12	NC	DNS			31
15	(France) Emily Bondi	15	Ret	20	11	Ret	10	11	8	11	15	Ret	17	31
16	(Germany) Lucy Michel	9	10	15	7	16	15	17	10	19	16	17	18	30
17	(South Africa) Jessica Howden	Ret	DNS			7	Ret	19	Ret	21	Ret	8	8	25
18	(United Kingdom) Chloe Jones											6	6	20
19	(Spain) Andrea Sibaja	16	19	19	16	11	16	20	14	12	11	18	12	20
20	(New Zealand) Avalon Lewis							8	5					19
21	(South Africa) Nicole Van Aswegen	11	13	16	14	9	Ret							17
22	(Austria) Lena Kemmer	Ret	11	12	12	Ret	14	Ret	15	16	18	15	19	17
23	(Japan) Luna Hirano	14	16	14	9	17	18	14	Ret	20	19	19	22	13
24	(United Kingdom) Jamie Hanks-Elliott					Ret	17			18	14	14	13	7
25	(Dominican Republic) Krystal Silfa	17	20	18	15									1
26	(Colombia) Sarah Varon					20	20	Ret	Ret	17	17	16	20	0
27	(Italy) Irene Bramato							18	16					0
28	(Italy) Beatrice Barbera	Ret	17											0
29	(Ukraine) Iryna Nadieieva	Ret	18			Ret	19							0
30	(United Kingdom) Alyssia Whitmore	18	DNS	Ret	DNS			Ret	DNS					0
31	(Portugal) Rafaela Peixoto									22	20			0
32	(United States) Sonya Lloyd											Ret	21	0
–	(Norway) Mia Rusthen	Ret	DNS											0
Pos.	Rider	MIS (Emilia-Romagna)		DON (United Kingdom)		ALG (Portugal)		CRE (Italy)		EST (Portugal)		JER (Spain)		Pts.

Colour	Result
Gold	Winner
Silver	Second place
Bronze	Third place
Green	Points classification
Blue	Non-points classification
Blue	Non-classified finish (NC)
Purple	Retired, not classified (Ret)
Red	Did not qualify (DNQ)
Red	Did not pre-qualify (DNPQ)
Black	Disqualified (DSQ)
White	Did not start (DNS)
White	Withdrew (WD)
White	Race cancelled (C)
Blank	Did not practice (DNP)
Blank	Did not arrive (DNA)
Blank	Excluded (EX)

**Bold** – Pole position
Italics – Fastest lap
