= Sara Sánchez =

Spanish motorcycle racer

- Born: November 19, 1997 (age 29); Barcelona, Spain
- Current team: 511 Terra&Vita Racing Team
- Bike number: 64
Motorcycle racing career statistics
Supersport 300 World Championship
Active years	2020-2021
2021 championship position	NC
Starts / Wins / Podiums / Poles / F. laps / Points; 4 / 0 / 0 / 0 / 0 / 0
Women's Circuit Racing World Championship
Active years	2024-
2026 championship position	10th (67 pts)
Starts / Wins / Podiums / Poles / F. laps / Points; 34 / 2 / 12 / 1 / 4 / 384

Sara Sánchez Tamayo (born 19 November 1997) is a Spanish motorcycle racer currently competing in the WorldWCR championship. She is also a MotoGP commentator for Catalunya Ràdio.

== Career ==
Sánchez’s involvement with motorcycles started when she was seven and was given a Honda 50cc motocross bike. She rode it on a track on the outskirts of Barcelona. At the age of nine, she began competing in the Copa Promo Velocidad RACC 50cc Road race series. She moved on to competing in regional and national series until at age 15 she crashed at Estoril and hit her head. Whilst not seriously injured, it concerned her father who sold her motorcycles temporarily ending her career.

Once Sánchez turned 18, she decided to return to motorcycle racing and in 2016 she won the Spanish RFME Women’s Open Yamaha R3 Cup. In 2019 she won the Copa Benelli 302R. The following year, she competed in the Women's European Cup and finished second and in 2021 she also finished second in the series.

Sánchez competed in the first two round of the 2020 Supersport 300 World Championship at Jerez and Estoril for ProGP Racing as replacement for Adrián Huertas who had been injured in training. She failed to qualify at Jerez and finished 26th and 20th in the two races at Estoril. At the season finale at Estoril, she substituted for Alessandro Zanca but failed to qualify. The following year she substituted for Vicente Pérez at Barcelona in the 2021 Supersport 300 World Championship.

In 2023, Sánchez competed in the Italian Supersport 300 series, finishing the season in tenth position.

Sánchez competed in the inaugural FIM Women's Circuit Racing World Championship in 2024, finishing third overall. She won two of the races, was on pole once and set the fastest lap four times. For achieving the highest number of fastest laps in the championship, she was given a Pirelli Best Lap award.

== Career statistics ==
=== Supersport 300 World Championship ===
(key)

Year	Bike	1	2	3	4	5	6	7	8	9	10	11	12	13	14	15	16	Pos	Pts	Refs
2020	Yamaha YZF-R3	JER1; DNQ	JER2; DNQ	POR1; 26	POR2; 20	ARA1	ARA2	ARA1	ARA2	CAT1	CAT1	MAG1	MAG2					NC	0	
2020	Kawasaki Ninja 400					ARA1	ARA2	ARA1	ARA2	CAT1	CAT1	MAG1	MAG2	EST1; DNQ	EST2; DNQ			NC	0	
2021	Yamaha YZF-R3	ARA1	ARA2	MIS1	MIS2	ASS1	ASS2	MOS1	MOS2	MAG1	MAG2	BAR1; 21	BAR2; 30	JER1	JER2	POR1	POR2	NC	0	

=== Women's Circuit Racing World Championship ===
(key) (Races in bold indicate pole position; races in italics indicate fastest lap)

Year	Bike	1	2	3	4	5	6	7	8	9	10	11	12	Pos	Pts
2024	Yamaha YZF-R7	MIS1; 3	MIS2; 2	DON1; 3	DON2; 3	ARG1; 2	**ARG2**; 2	CRE1; 2	CRE2; Ret	EST1; 4	**EST1**; 1	**JER1**; Ret	**JER2**; 1	3rd	191
2025	Yamaha YZF-R7	ASS1; 3	ASS2; 3	CRE1; 5	CRE2; 4	DON1; 4	DON2; 2	BAL1; 5	BAL2; 5	MAG1 ret	MAG2	JER1; 9	JER2; 8	5th	126
2026	Yamaha YZF-R7	ARG1; 5	ARG2; 9	ASS1; Ret	ASS2; 13	BAL1	BAL2	MIS1; 8	MIS2; 7	DON1; 5	DON2; 5	JER1; 8	JER2; Ret	10th	67
