= María Herrera =

Spanish motorcycle racer

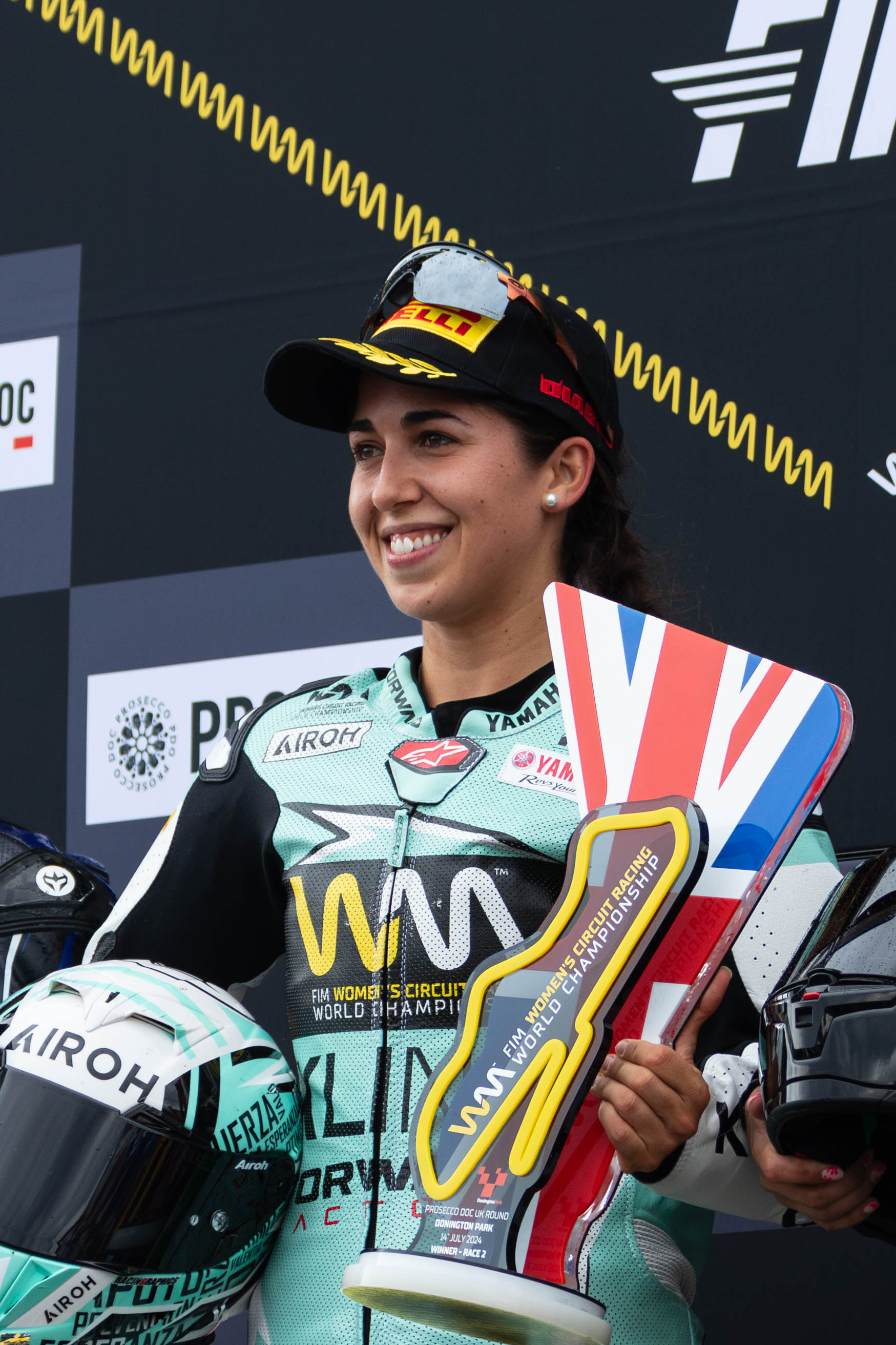
- Herrera At Donington Park, 2024
- Nationality: Spanish
- Born: 26 August 1996 (age 30); Oropesa, Spain
- Current team: OpenBank Aspar Team
- Bike number: 6
Motorcycle racing career statistics
Moto3 World Championship
Active years	2013–2017, 2022
Manufacturers	KTM, Honda, Husqvarna, Mahindra
Championships	0
2022 championship position	43rd (0 pts)
Starts / Wins / Podiums / Poles / F. laps / Points; 54 / 0 / 0 / 0 / 0 / 17
MotoE World Championship
Active years	2019–
Manufacturers	Energica, Ducati
Championships	0
2024 championship position	16th (43 pts)
Starts / Wins / Podiums / Poles / F. laps / Points; 66 / 0 / 0 / 0 / 0 / 189
Supersport World Championship
Active years	2019–
Manufacturers	Yamaha, Honda
Championships	0
2021 championship position	34th (7 pts)
Starts / Wins / Podiums / Poles / F. laps / Points; 29 / 0 / 0 / 0 / 0 / 14
Women's Circuit Racing World Championship
Active years	2024-
Manufacturers	Yamaha
Championships	2 (2025, 2026)
2026 championship position	1st (6 wins/ 250 pts)
Starts / Wins / Podiums / Poles / F. laps / Points; 36 / 18 / 29 / 10 / 4 / 710

María Herrera Muñoz (born 26 August 1996) is a Spanish motorcycle racer. She won the 2025 FIM Women's Circuit Racing World Championship after double winning at the final round in Circuito de Jerez, and again in 2026. She is also a champion in ESBK, having won the championship in 2020 and 2021.

== Career ==
=== Early career ===
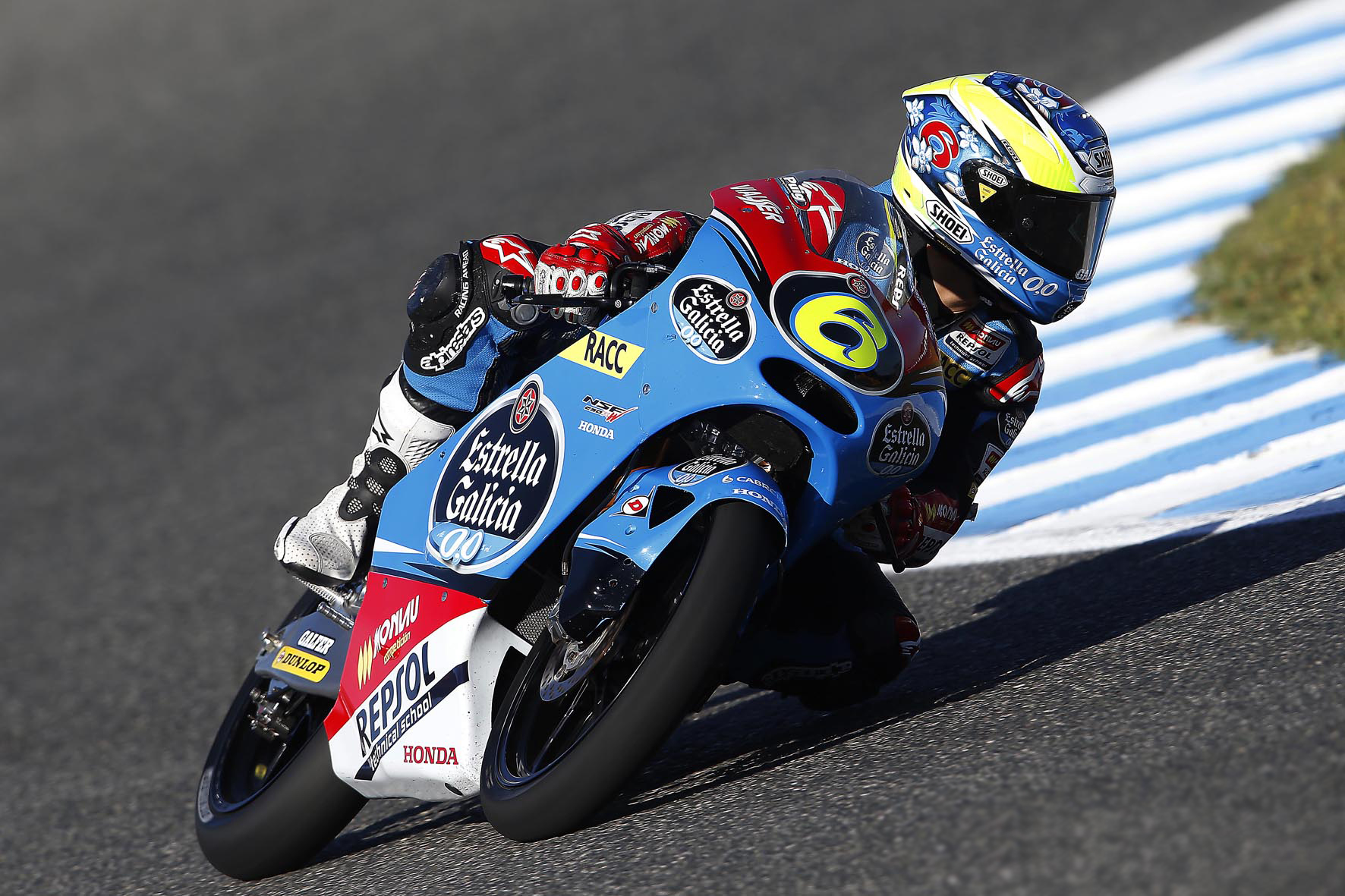
Herrera practicing at the 2014 Spanish Grand Prix

Born in Oropesa, Toledo, Herrera was the first female competitor to win a race in the FIM CEV Repsol series, winning the Moto3 race at Motorland Aragón for the Junior Team Estrella Galicia 0,0 squad in 2013. She added a second victory later in the season at Circuito de Navarra, and led the championship into the final round at Jerez. Ultimately, Herrera retired from the final race, and finished fourth in the championship, thirteen points behind champion Fabio Quartararo. Herrera was joined by Quartararo at the Junior Team Estrella Galicia 0,0 squad for the 2014 season. Despite recording a victory in the opening round at Jerez, she only finished on the podium twice, and finished eighth in the championship.

=== Moto3 World Championship ===
While competing in the Spanish championship, Herrera made four guest appearances in the Moto3 World Championship as a wildcard at the Spanish rounds with the Junior Estrella Galicia 0,0 team. In 2015 she embarked on a full season Grand Prix campaign, riding alongside compatriot Isaac Viñales in the Husqvarna Factory Laglisse team. Herrera's best result was 11th-place at Phillip Island.

Herrera was included in the provisional entry list for the 2016 Moto3 season, partnering Lorenzo Dalla Porta at Team Laglisse on KTM bikes. However, the team initially withdrew from the championship due to financial issues. However, on 1 March, Herrera announced her intention to compete in 2016, with Herrera riding a sole KTM entry; which includes her taking over operations of Team Laglisse and becoming an owner-rider for 2016.

Herrera was the only female rider in the MotoGP paddock for 2017 with Team AGR, who was running a single bike in both Moto3 and Moto2 series. She took part in the Moto3 category in 2017. She raced in the same Moto3 class the previous year as Owner-Rider on a KTM with team MH6 and in 2015 with Husqvarna Factory Laglisse.

=== Supersport 300 World Championship ===
In 2018 Maria Herrera was riding for BCD Yamaha MS Racing on a Yamaha YZF-R3 in the FIM Supersport 300 World Championship. She finished 13th in the 2018 World Supersport 300 standings with 45 points taking one fastest lap along the way and several top ten finishes to her name.

=== MotoE ===
Herrera returned to the Grand Prix paddock in 2019, with the Ángel Nieto Team have announcing her as their second rider for the inaugural FIM Enel 2019 MotoE World Cup. The Spanish rider lined up alongside 2011 125cc World Champion and former World SBK and World SSP rider Nico Terol for the Ángel Nieto Team in the first global racing series MotoE World Cup for electric motorcycles. Herrera continued with the Ángel Nieto Team in MotoE until 2024 when she switched to the Klint Forward Factory Team.

=== WorldWCR ===
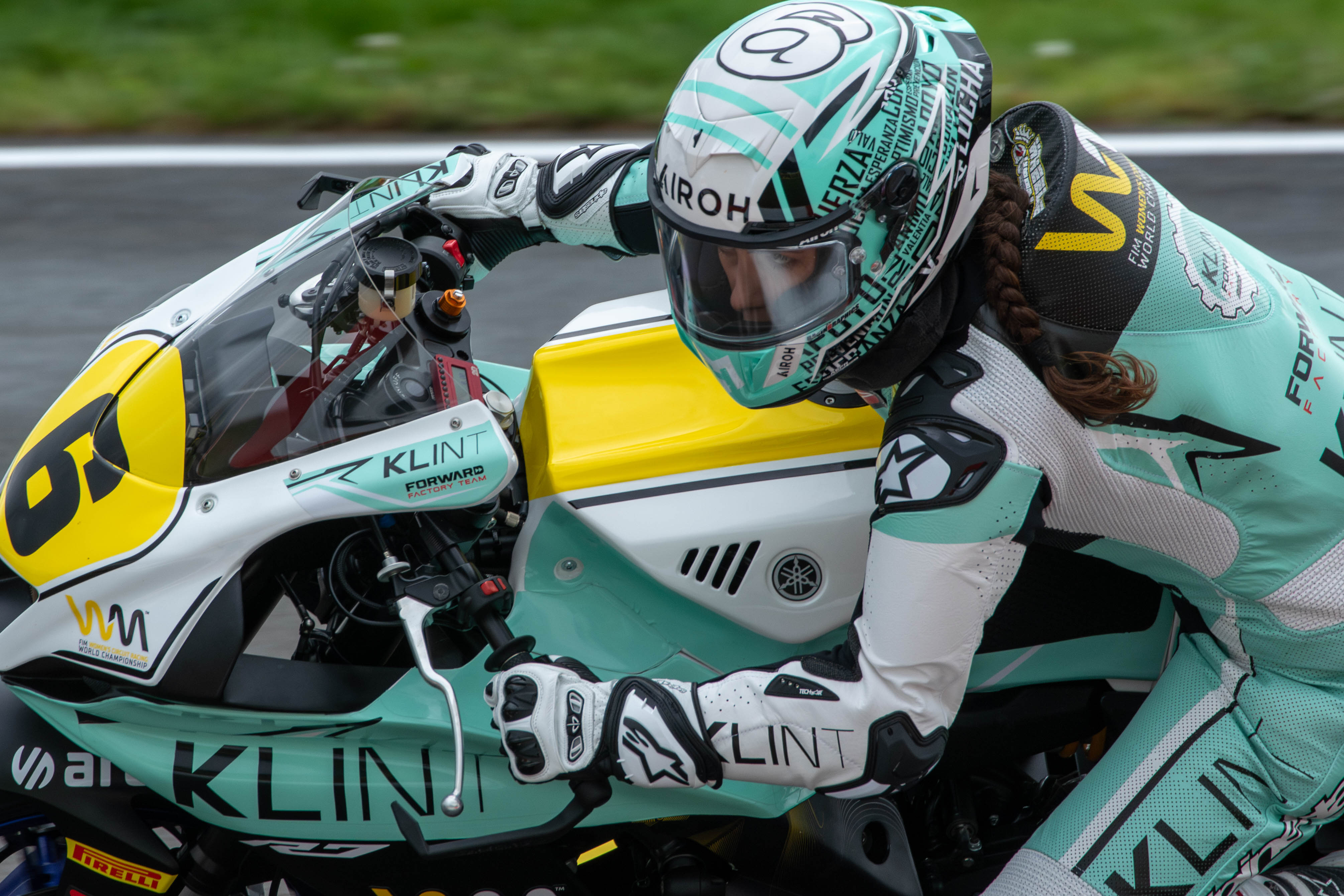
Maria Herrera, World WCR, Donington 2024

In 2024, Herrera participated in the inaugural FIM Women's Circuit Racing World Championship (WorldWCR) with the Klint Forward Factory Team, finishing second overall in the championship. She remained with the Klint Forward Team in 2025 and won the championship. In 2026, she changed to The Terra & Vita GRT Team and won the championship for a second time.

== Career statistics ==
=== FIM CEV Moto3 Championship ===
==== Races by year ====
(key) (Races in bold indicate pole position; races in italics indicate fastest lap)

Year	Bike	1	2	3	4	5	6	7	8	9	Pos	Pts
2012	Honda	JER; 23	NAV; WD	ARA; Ret	CAT; 29	ALB1; 19	ALB2; 15	VAL; 16			30th	1
2013	KTM	CAT1; 11	CAT2; 13	ARA; 1	ALB1; 6	ALB2; 13	NAV; 1	VAL1; 5	VAL1; 2	JER; Ret	4th	102

=== FIM CEV Moto3 International Championship ===
==== Races by year ====
(key) (Races in bold indicate pole position; races in italics indicate fastest lap)

Year	Bike	1	2	3	4	5	6	7	8	9	10	11	Pos	Pts
2014	Honda	JER1; 2	JER2; 1	LMS; Ret	ARA; 6	CAT1; Ret	CAT2; 8	ALB; 9	NAV; 7	ALG; Ret	VAL1; 5	VAL2; Ret	8th	90

=== Grand Prix motorcycle racing ===
==== By season ====
Season	Class	Motorcycle	Team	Race	Win	Podium	Pole	FLap	Pts	Plcd
2013	Moto3	KTM	Junior Team Estrella Galicia 0,0	1	0	0	0	0	0	NC
2014	Moto3	Honda	Junior Team Estrella Galicia 0,0	3	0	0	0	0	0	NC
2015	Moto3	Husqvarna	Husqvarna Factory Laglisse	18	0	0	0	0	9	29th
2016	Moto3	KTM	MH6 Laglisse; MH6 Team	16	0	0	0	0	7	31st
2017	Moto3	KTM	AGR Team	15	0	0	0	0	1	35th
2017	Moto3	Mahindra	Aspar Mahindra Moto3	15	0	0	0	0	1	35th
2017	Moto3	KTM	MH6 Team	15	0	0	0	0	1	35th
2019	MotoE	Energica	Openbank Ángel Nieto Team	6	0	0	0	0	27	14th
2020	MotoE	Energica	Openbank Aspar Team	7	0	0	0	0	33	17th
2021	MotoE	Energica	OpenBank Aspar Team	7	0	0	0	0	27	15th
2022	MotoE	Energica	OpenBank Aspar Team	12	0	0	0	0	21	17th
2022	Moto3	KTM	Angeluss MTA Team	1	0	0	0	0	0	43rd
2023	MotoE	Ducati V21L	Openbank Aspar Team	16	0	0	0	0	17	18th
2024	MotoE	Ducati V21L	Klint Forward Factory Team	16	0	0	0	0	43	16th
2025	MotoE	Ducati V21L	Klint Forward Factory Team	12	0	0	0	0	38	16th
Total				**130**	**0**	**0**	**0**	**0**	**223**	

==== By class ====
Class	Seasons	1st GP	1st pod	1st win	Race	Win	Podiums	Pole	FLap	Pts	WChmp
Moto3	2013–2017, 2022	2013 Aragon			54	0	0	0	0	17	0
MotoE	2019–present	2019 Germany			76	0	0	0	0	189	0
Total	2013–2017, 2019–present				**130**	**0**	**0**	**0**	**0**	**223**	**0**

==== Races by year ====
(key) (Races in bold indicate pole position; races in italics indicate fastest lap)

Year	Class	Bike	1	2	3	4	5	6	7	8	9	10	11	12	13	14	15	16	17	18	19	20	Pos	Pts
2013	Moto3	KTM	QAT	AME	SPA	FRA	ITA	CAT	NED	GER	INP	CZE	GBR	RSM	ARA; 29	MAL	AUS	JPN	VAL				NC	0
2014	Moto3	Honda	QAT	AME	ARG	SPA; 17	FRA	ITA	CAT; Ret	NED	GER	INP	CZE	GBR	RSM	ARA	JPN	AUS	MAL	VAL; 27			NC	0
2015	Moto3	Husqvarna	QAT; 22	AME; 17	ARG; Ret	SPA; Ret	FRA; 19	ITA; 21	CAT; 15	NED; Ret	GER; Ret	INP; 24	CZE; 23	GBR; Ret	RSM; 24	ARA; 13	JPN; 26	AUS; 11	MAL; 18	VAL; 21			29th	9
2016	Moto3	KTM	QAT; 16	ARG; 14	AME; 23	SPA; 19	FRA; 21	ITA; 21	CAT; Ret	NED; 14	GER; DNS	AUT; 14	CZE; 19	GBR; 26	RSM; Ret	ARA; 28	JPN; 23	AUS; 15	MAL; NC	VAL			31st	7
2017	Moto3	KTM	QAT; 21	ARG; 15	AME; 22	SPA; 24	FRA; 20	ITA; 26	CAT; 26	NED; 20	GER; 26	CZE; Ret	AUT; 22	GBR; 26	RSM; DNS	ARA; DNS	JPN			VAL; 26			35th	1
2017	Moto3	Mahindra																AUS; 19	MAL; 24				35th	1
2019	MotoE	Energica	GER; 16	AUT; 16	RSM1; 6	RSM2; 5	VAL1; 14	VAL2; 12															14th	27
2020	MotoE	Energica	SPA; 15	ANC; 11	RSM; 15	EMI1; 11	EMI2; 11	FRA1; 7	FRA2; 9														17th	33
2021	MotoE	Energica	SPA; 9	FRA; 10	CAT; 11	NED; 15	AUT; 17	RSM1; 13	RSM2; 11														15th	27
2022	MotoE	Energica	SPA1; 15	SPA2; 14	FRA1; 14	FRA2; 15	ITA1; 16	ITA2; 15	NED1; 15	NED2; 8^{‡}	AUT1; 11	AUT2; 14	RSM1; 14	RSM2; Ret									17th	21
2022	Moto3	KTM	QAT	INA	ARG	AME	POR	SPA	FRA	ITA	CAT	GER	NED	GBR	AUT	RSM	ARA; 27	JPN	THA	AUS	MAL	VAL	43rd	0
2023	MotoE	Ducati	FRA1; 12	FRA2; 15	ITA1; 17	ITA2; 14	GER1; 15	GER2; 18	NED1; 18	NED2; 15	GBR1; 15	GBR2; 13	AUT1; 15	AUT2; 18	CAT1; 16	CAT2; 16	RSM1; 13	RSM2; 16					18th	17
2024	MotoE	Ducati	POR1; 11	POR2; 17	FRA1; 14	FRA2; 14	CAT1; 13	CAT2; 13	ITA1; 15	ITA2; 17	NED1; 11	NED2; 13	GER1; 12	GER2; 17	AUT1; 10	AUT2; 12	RSM1; 14	RSM2; 13					16th	43
2025	MotoE	Ducati	FRA1; 8	FRA2; 4	NED1; 15	NED2; 15	AUT1; 16	AUT2; 14	HUN1; 13	HUN2; 15	CAT1	CAT2	RSM1; 16	RSM2; 11	POR1; 15	POR2; 13							16th	38

^{‡} Half points awarded as less than two thirds of the race distance (but at least three full laps) was completed.
* Season still in progress.

=== Supersport 300 World Championship ===
==== Races by year ====
(key) (Races in bold indicate pole position; races in italics indicate fastest lap)

Year	Bike	1	2	3	4	5	6	7	8	Pos	Pts	Ref
2018	Yamaha	SPA; 17	NED; 10	ITA; 7	GBR; 18	CZE; 9	ITA; 6	POR; Ret	FRA; 4	13th	45	

=== Supersport World Championship ===
==== Races by year ====
(key) (Races in bold indicate pole position; races in italics indicate fastest lap)

Year	Bike	1	2	3	4	5	6	7	8	9	10	11	12	Pos	Pts
2019	Yamaha	AUS; 16	THA; 15	SPA; 15	NED; 19	ITA; 15	SPA; 14	ITA; DSQ	GBR	POR; Ret	FRA	ARG	QAT	29th	5

Year	Bike	1		2		3		4		5		6		7		8		9		10		11		12		Pos	Pts
Year	Bike	R1	R2	R1	R2	R1	R2	R1	R2	R1	R2	R1	R2	R1	R2	R1	R2	R1	R2	R1	R2	R1	R2	R1	R2	Pos	Pts
2020	Honda	AUS		SPA	SPA	POR; 19	POR; 18																			27th	2
2020	Yamaha							SPA; 14	SPA; 20	SPA; 17	SPA; 17	SPA	SPA	FRA	FRA	POR	POR									27th	2
2021	Yamaha	SPA; 12	SPA; 13	POR; 19	POR; 20	ITA; Ret	ITA; Ret	NED; Ret	NED; 20	CZE	CZE	SPA; 19	SPA; 22	FRA; 21	FRA; 19	SPA	SPA	SPA; C	SPA; 18	POR; 18	POR; 23	ARG	ARG	INA	INA	34th	7

=== Women's Motorcycling World Championship ===
==== Races by year ====
(key) (Races in bold indicate pole position; races in italics indicate fastest lap)

Year	Team	Bike	1	2	3	4	5	6	7	8	9	10	11	12	Pos	Pts
2024	Klint Forward Team	Yamaha YZF-R7	**MIS1**; 1	MIS2; 1	DON1; 4	DON2; 1	**ARG1**; 1	ARG2; 3	**CRE1**; 1	CRE2; Ret	EST1; 2	EST2; 3	JER1; 1	JER2; Ret	2nd	215
2025	Klint Forward Team	Yamaha YZF-R7	**ASS1**; 1	ASS2; 2	**CRE1**; 2	CRE2; 1	DON1; 1	DON2; 3	BAL1; 1	BAL2; 3	MAG1; 1	MAG2; 4	**JER1**; 1	**JER2**; 6	1st	245
2026	Terra & Vita GRT Yamaha WorldWCR Team	Yamaha YZF-R7	**ALG1**; 1	**ALG2**; 2	ASS1; 1	ASS2; 2	BAL1; 1	BAL2; 3	MIS1; 1	MIS2; 1	**DON1**; 1	**DON2**; 2	JER1; 5	JER2; 4	1st	250
