= Chloe Jones (motorcyclist) =

British motorcycle racer

- Born: 15 December 2003 (age 22); Northampton, United Kingdom
- Occupation: Motorcycle racer
- Current series: WorldWCR
- Current team: Monster Energy Crescent Yamaha
- Previous teams: GR Motosport; Rokit Rookies; M.R.S Racing
- Bike number: 15
- Website: chloejonesracing.co.uk

Awards
- MCN Young Rider of the Year Award 2025
Statistics
WorldWCR
Active years	2024
Championships	0
Current team	Monster Energy Crescent Yamaha
Previous teams	GR Motosport
Last season (2026)	5th (115 pts)
Starts / Wins / Podiums / Poles / F. laps / Points; 26 / 0 / 8 / 1 / 3 / 299

Chloe Jones (born 15 December 2003) is a British motorcycle racer competing in the 2026 FIM Women's Circuit Racing World Championship. She also completed the 2025 series, finishing in third place.

== Biography ==
Jones was born on 15 December 2003 in Northampton, England. She used to accompany her father to motorcycle races where he would help out with tyre warmers and fuel. Jones would ride around the paddock on a borrowed mini-moto. Jones' parents eventually purchased a mini-bike for her.

=== Racing career ===
Jones started racing in 2015, at the age of 11, in the Novice class of the British Mini Bike Championship and won the championship. The following year, she moved up to the Pro class, sponsored by LRJ Racing, and finished second in the championship. That same year, she got a IMR Mini Gp 140 bike and joined the Mini GP 140 Championship for the fourth round. Winning every race she entered except the final race, she finished the season third in the Championship. She won the championship the following year with sponsorship from M.R.S Racing. In 2017, Jones moved up to the adult open class of Mini Bike Championship on a M.R.S Racing Honda CRF150.

In July 2017 Jones was one of 90 riders picked to take part in the British Talent Cup selection event to be held at Silverstone during the weekend of the 2017 British motorcycle Grand Prix. The competition was open to 12-16 year old, Jones, at 13, was one of the younger riders. She had only raced mini-bikes previously so racing a Honda NSF250R that the series used was a new experience. Jones reached the final 32 riders before being eliminated.

Moving up to full-size bikes, Jones entered the British Junior Supersport Championship in 2018, staying in the series for several years. Her best result of the 1920 season was 7th in the wet at Snetterton.

Jones again competed in the British Junior Supersport Championship on a Yamaha YZF-R3 in 2021 with M.R.S Racing team and financial and technical support from BSB team OMG Racing. She also competed in the British BluCru Challenge.

Stepping up to the Junior Superstock Championship in 2022, Jones competed on a Yamaha R6.

Returning to the Junior Supersport Championship in 2023, Jones gained her first podium at Oulton Park and set a lap record at Brands Hatch.

Jones competed in the British Superteen Championship in 2024 on a Kawasaki Ninja ZX-4R for Leon Haslam’s Rokit Rookies, finishing the season in fourth place.

In 2025, Jones won the Motorcycle News Young Rider of the Year Award.

==== Women's Circuit Racing World Championship ====
GR Motosport entered Jones as a wildcard at the finale of the 2024 WorldWCR Championship at Jerez. Jones finished sixth in both races.

Entered by GR Motosport for the 2025 season, the team felt Jones was disadvantaged by lack of experience on the Yamaha YZF-R7 and the European circuit used in the series. In January 2025, they took delivery of two R7's and converted them to WorldWCR specification for a pre-season testing programme at various track, starting at the Circuito de Cartagena. At Assen, Jones broke her arm two weeks before the start of the 2025 season.

Jones achieved six podiums in her rookie season and finished the season third overall. Also in 2025, Jones started mentoring young female riders.

GR Motosport withdrew from on-track activities at the end of 2025. Without a ride for 2026, Jones signed with Monster Energy Crescent Yamaha, which had provided a machine to Beatriz Neila as sole rider during 2024 and 2025. Crescent Racing, a long-term works Yamaha team in World Superbikes, became a two-machine team. Twice WSBK champion James Toseland became her manager.

== Racing results ==
=== WorldWCR ===
(key) (Races in bold indicate pole position; races in italics indicate fastest lap)

Year	1	2	3	4	5	6	7	8	9	10	11	12	Pos.	Pts.
2024	MIS1	MIS2	DON1	DON2	ALG1	ALG2	CRE1	CRE2	EST1	EST2	JER1; 6	JER2; 6	18th	20
2025	ASS1; 6	ASS2; 7	CRE1; 11	CRE2; 8	DON; 3	DON; 11	BAL1; 2	BAL2; 2	**MAG1**; 2	**MAG2**; 2	JER; 2	JER; 5	3rd	164
2026	POR1; 13	POR2; 14	ASS1; 4	ASS2; 6	BAL1; 6	BAL2; 9	MIS1; 3	MIS2; 10	DON1; 6	DON2; 4	JER1; 7	JER2; 3	5th	115
