= Bradley Smith (motorcyclist) =

British motorcycle racer (born 1990)

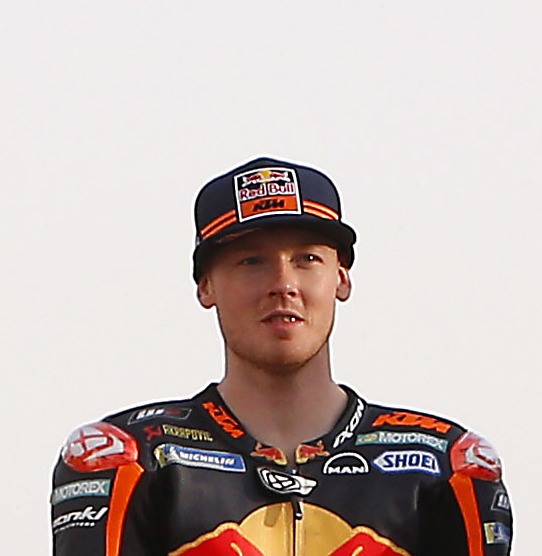
- Smith in 2018
- Nationality: British
- Born: 28 November 1990 (age 35); Oxford, Oxfordshire, England
- Current team: BMW Motorrad WorldSBK
- Website: www.bradleysmith38.com
Motorcycle racing career statistics
MotoGP World Championship
Active years	2013–2020
Manufacturers	Yamaha, KTM, Aprilia
Championships	0
2020 championship position	21st (12 pts)
Starts / Wins / Podiums / Poles / F. laps / Points; 119 / 0 / 2 / 0 / 0 / 559
Moto2 World Championship
Active years	2011–2012, 2019
Manufacturers	Tech 3, Kalex
Championships	0
2019 championship position	NC (0 pts)
Starts / Wins / Podiums / Poles / F. laps / Points; 34 / 0 / 3 / 0 / 1 / 233
125cc World Championship
Active years	2006–2010
Manufacturers	Honda, Aprilia
Championships	0
2010 championship position	4th (223 pts)
Starts / Wins / Podiums / Poles / F. laps / Points; 80 / 3 / 20 / 9 / 4 / 717.5
MotoE World Championship
Active years	2019, 2022
Manufacturers	Energica
Championships	0
2022 championship position	18th (12 pts)
Starts / Wins / Podiums / Poles / F. laps / Points; 11 / 0 / 4 / 0 / 0 / 100
Supersport World Championship
Active years	2022
Manufacturers	Yamaha
Championships	0
2022 championship position	33rd (2 pts)
Starts / Wins / Podiums / Poles / F. laps / Points; 2 / 0 / 0 / 0 / 0 / 2

Bradley William Smith (born 28 November 1990) is a British motorcycle racer acting as a test-rider for the official BMW Motorrad WorldSBK factory team in World Superbikes.

Smith was linked to RNF E-Racing in MotoE for 2022. He was injured shortly after a Le Mans start at an FIM Endurance World Championship event in April 2022 when opening for team Moto Ain Yamaha. He missed the opening three rounds of the MotoE racing season, being declared unfit to race at the third round at Mugello on 29 May 2022.

Late in 2022, Smith was called-in to ride as a rookie in the World Supersport Championship class, to replace injured Leonardo Taccini. Smith finished 14th after a three-place penalty in the first race at Circuito San Juan Villicum (Argentina), but was taken out when Luca Bernardi crashed into the rear of his Ten Kate Yamaha R6 at turn one early in the second race.

Smith was previously contracted from 2019 to Aprilia Racing as a development/test/replacement rider in the MotoGP class of the World Championship.

Smith was also contracted as a development officer, "to assist with rider recruitment and development" in the inaugural eSkootr Championship race series planned for 2022. During 2021 he was expected to participate in a British GP2 event, part of a series run alongside the British Supersport championship, for a one-off ride at Snetterton but failed to arrive at the circuit, instead competing in moto cross event.

Smith is the only rider to have taken a podium in all four classes of Grand Prix motorcycle racing, with top-three finishes in the pre-Moto3 125 cc class, Moto2 class, MotoGP class and MotoE World Cup.

Smith had a long association with the French Tech3 team, riding for six seasons, two in Moto2 class and four in MotoGP using factory-supported Yamaha YZR-M1 machines. He won the Suzuka 8 Hours in 2015, with Yamaha teammates Katsuyuki Nakasuga and Pol Espargaró.

== Career ==
=== Early career ===
Born in Oxford, Oxfordshire, Smith's father raced in Motocross, and the family owned an open practice track. Smith got his first motocross bike aged six.

Smith applied for selection to the Auto-Cycle Union (ACU) academy for young racers, but was never chosen. He spent a year in 2004 aged 13 competing in Aprilia Superteens competition, finishing fourth behind three ACU Academy riders. In January 2005, he was asked to compete for the year in the Spanish 125cc championship as part of the MOTO GP Academy, winning the last three races ending the year second just one point behind the champion.

=== 125cc World Championship ===
For 2006, Smith joined the Repsol Honda 125cc Grand Prix World Championship squad, managed by Alberto Puig finishing 19th overall and rookie of the year, with a best result of 8th place in Motegi.

Remaining with the team in 2007, Smith took a first podium with third place at Le Mans. Nine more top-10 finishes left him 10th overall.

Smith signed with the Polaris World Aprilia team for the 2008 season. He secured his first pole position at the opening round of the season at the Losail International Circuit in Qatar on 8 March, but suffered a technical problem while leading. A number of midseason injuries affected him, but he scored podium finishes at Jerez and Le Mans (after briefly leading the five-lap sprint required by a red flag for rain). He led at both Assen and Sachsenring, but finished off the podium in both. He ended the season sixth overall, with three poles and four podium finishes but no victory.

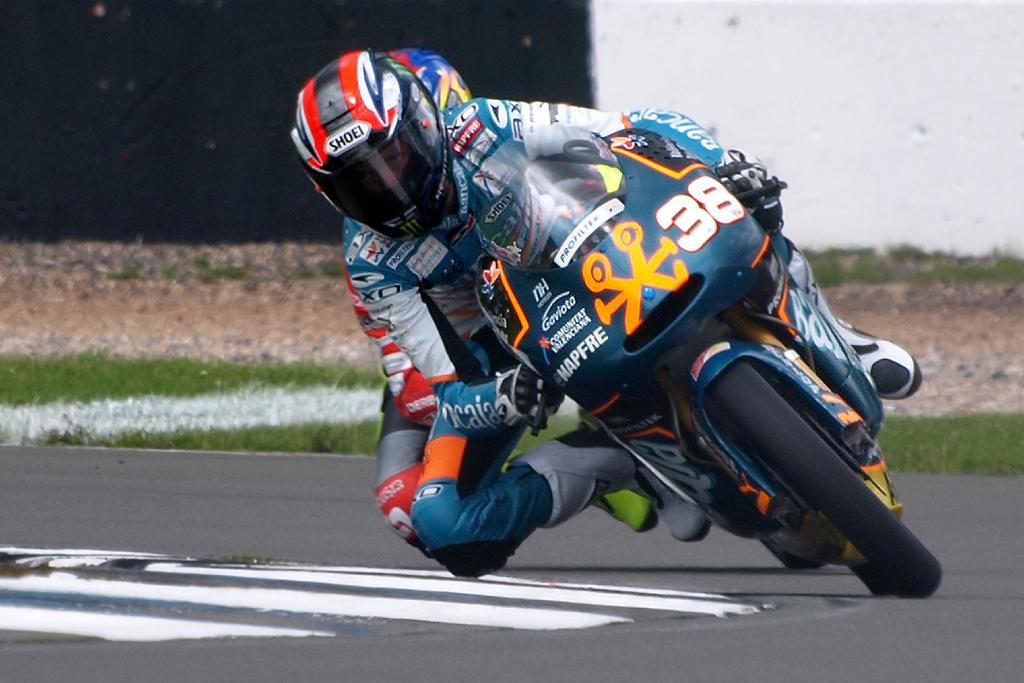
Smith at the 2009 British Grand Prix

For the 2009 season, Smith signed for Jorge Martínez's Bancaja Aspar Team to continue to ride an Aprilia, alongside Julian Simon. The deal also included an option to race in 250s for the team in 2010. Smith had almost signed for the team in 2008, before signing for Polarisworld.

Smith won his first ever Grand Prix with a dominant performance at Jerez in May 2009. Smith's first Pole Position of the season came at Mugello in which he scored his second Grand Prix victory after a brilliant fight against Nicolás Terol and Julian Simon. This race put Smith in the lead of the Championship with 74.5 points, just 3.5 points ahead of Simon. However, Simon hit form and ultimately won the title. Smith finished second to his teammate in the last three races of the season, losing the lead on the final lap in two of them. He ultimately finished as series runner-up.

In August 2009, Smith stated his ambition to move up to the new Moto2 class with the Aspar team, but the team's two seats were given to Julian Simon and Mike Di Meglio instead. In November 2009, Smith agreed a deal to remain with the Aspar team in the 125cc class for 2010 alongside Nicolas Terol.

Smith was a favourite for the title in 2010, after finishing runner-up in 2009, however the year was dominated by Spanish trio Marc Márquez, Pol Espargaró and Nicolás Terol. Smith did however manage three pole positions and six podiums, including a win at the final round of the season in Valencia on the way to fourth place in championship standings.

=== Moto2 World Championship ===
==== Tech3 (2011–2012) ====
===== 2011 =====
After the 2010 Portuguese Grand Prix, it was announced that Smith would be competing in Moto2 in 2011, racing for the Tech3 team, alongside one of the riders that had denied him a Moto2 move a year previous, Mike Di Meglio. On 19 September 2011, it was announced that Smith had signed a three-year contract with Tech 3 that would see him remain in Moto2 in 2012, before moving to MotoGP in 2013.

Smith started his debut campaign in the Moto2 class well with seventh in his first race before following it up with a fourth-place finish at the Spanish Grand Prix. Smith scored his first podium with a second-place finish in his home Grand Prix at Silverstone, and he followed it up with two third-place finishes at the next two rounds. Smith finished his début season in the class, in seventh place in the final championship standings.

===== 2012 =====
Smith's 2012 season was full of consistent points-scoring finishes, scoring points in all bar two races, but without a podium. His best result was a fourth-place finish at the Italian Grand Prix, and he eventually finished the season in ninth place in the final championship standings.

==== Petronas Sprinta Racing (2019) ====
===== 2019 =====
Smith replaced Khairul Idham Pawi at his home grand prix in Silverstone, as one of several replacement riders following the Malaysian's withdrawal from the season due to injury.

=== MotoGP World Championship ===
==== Monster Yamaha Tech3 (2013–2016) ====
===== 2013 =====
Smith was promoted to the premier class aboard a Yamaha for Tech3, with teammate Cal Crutchlow. He concluded the season in 10th place, with 116 points, running consistently within the top ten riders in most races. His best result were a trio of sixth places obtained in the Catalan, German and Australian Grands Prix.

===== 2014 =====
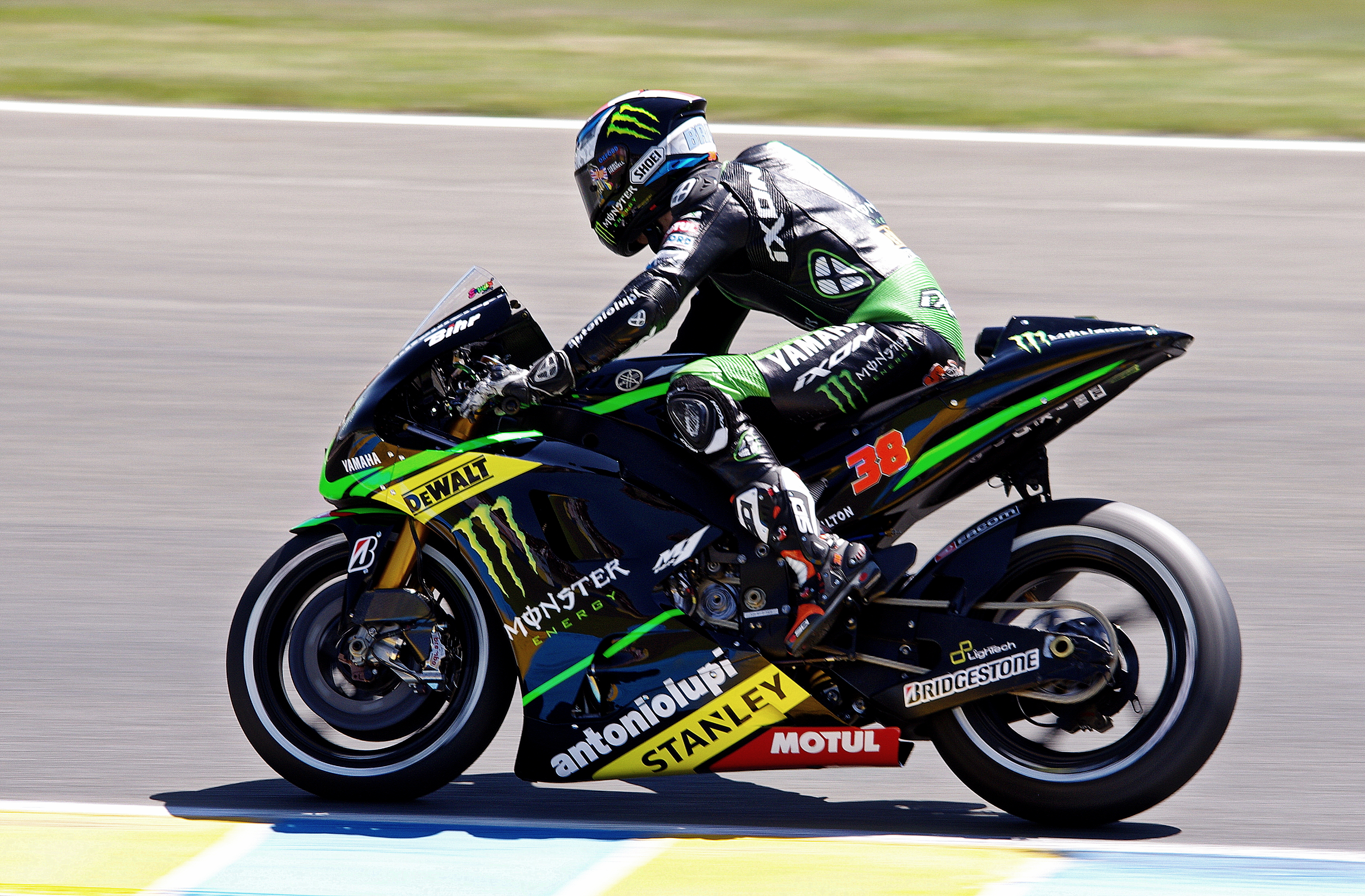
Smith at the 2014 French Grand Prix

In 2014, Smith continued to race with Tech3, with teammate Pol Espargaró. He finished fifth in the second round of the championship, the Grand Prix of the Americas in Texas, achieving his best result at that time. Later in the season, Smith achieved his first podium in MotoGP at Phillip Island, finishing in third place; he took advantage of late-race crashes for Cal Crutchlow and Espargaró to move into the position. He also received a penalty point from Race Direction, after he was deemed to have overtaken another rider under yellow flags. He finished the season in 8th place.

===== 2015 =====
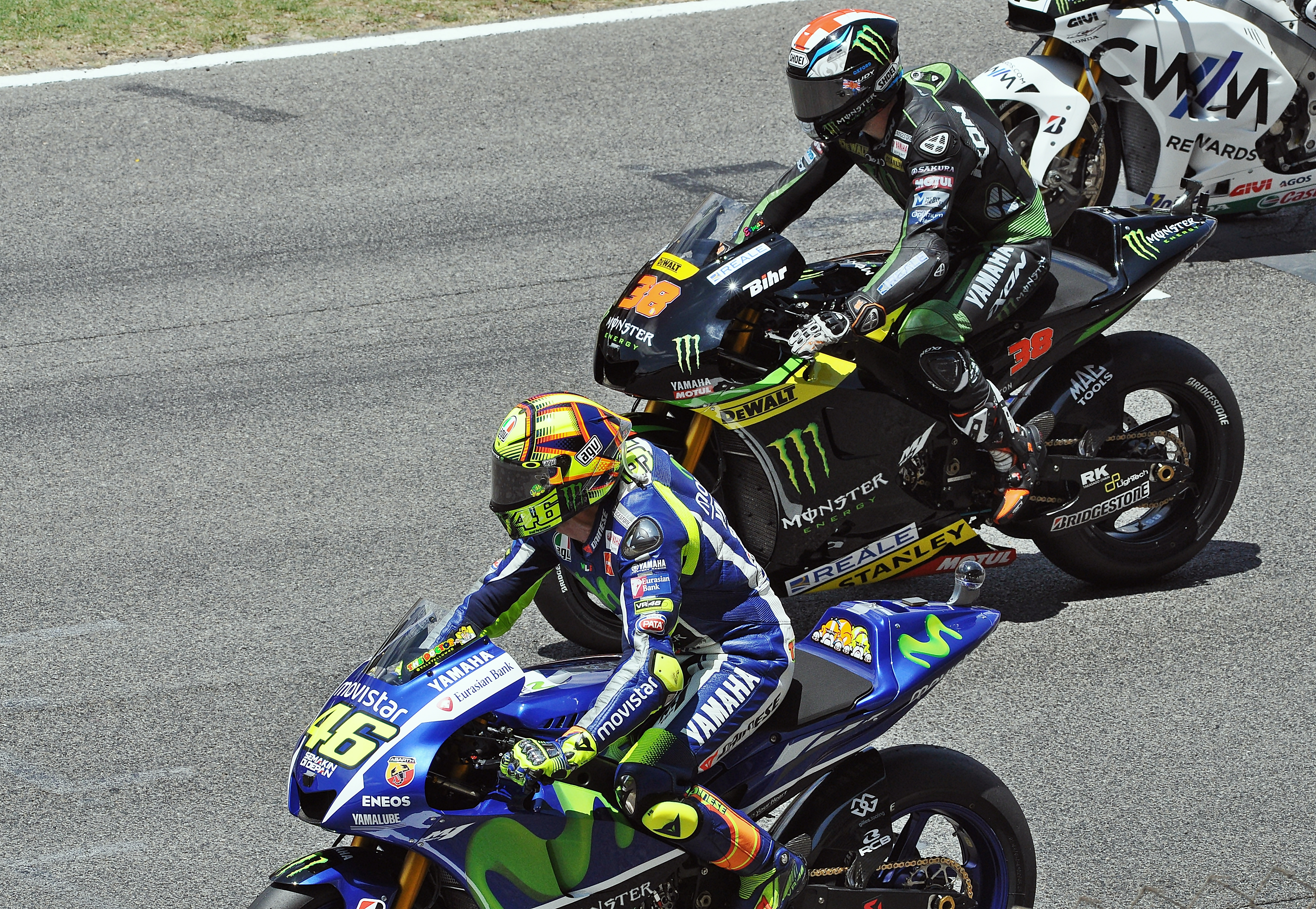
Smith alongside Valentino Rossi at the 2015 Catalan Grand Prix

Remaining with Tech3 for the 2015 season, Smith finished each of the first twelve races in the top ten placings, with two fifth-place finishes being his best results. At the San Marino Grand Prix, Smith achieved his best MotoGP result with a second-place finish despite staying out on track on slick tyres as rain was falling – he fell as low as 21st in the race order before riding through the field. With Scott Redding finishing third, the duo became the first pair of British riders to finish on a premier class podium since Barry Sheene and Tom Herron did so at the Venezuelan Grand Prix in 1979. With 181 points, Smith achieved his (as of February 2020) career-best finish in the MotoGP class in sixth place, best of all non-factory riders.

===== 2016 =====
In 2016, a difficult start to the season culminated in a mid-season injury in practice at the Czech round. Though he started the Czech race before a mechanical retirement, Smith subsequently missed the next 3 rounds due to the sustained injury, being replaced by superbike rider Alex Lowes. Smith was relegated to just 17th place in the rider's championship.

==== Red Bull KTM Factory Racing (2017–2018) ====
===== 2017 =====
In March 2016, Smith was confirmed as the first-signed rider for the new KTM works entry to the championship. He was later joined by his long-time Tech3 teammate Espargaró.

The 2017 season proved difficult but positive for Smith and the new constructor, finishing third-to-last of all regular riders and well behind his teammate, but achieving sufficient points to finish ahead of Aprilia in the constructors' championship and tenth of 12 in the teams' championship.

===== 2018 =====
2018 showed slight improvement for Smith as he climbed to 18th place in the championship with 38 points, though well behind teammate Espargaró, despite having fewer retirements on the season.

==== Aprilia Racing Team ====
===== 2019 =====
With the high-profile signing of Johann Zarco at KTM, Smith was dropped by the factory team. He was quickly signed by Aprilia in a test rider role. Aprilia elected to enter Smith as a wildcard entry at four rounds: Qatar, Jerez, Catalunya, and Aragon. With two retirements, a 17th- and a 19th-place finish, he achieved no points in his wildcard entries.

==== Aprilia Racing Team Gresini ====
===== 2020 =====
Smith came back as a replacement full-time rider, after Andrea Iannone's suspension due to a doping controversy. He was replaced by Lorenzo Savadori for the last three rounds.

=== MotoE World Cup ===
==== One Energy Racing (2019) ====
For 2019, alongside his Aprilia test and wildcard rider duties, Smith was permitted to sign with One Energy Racing for the inaugural season of the MotoE World Cup. Of the six race season, Smith achieved four podiums and clinched second place in the standings with 88 points.

=== World SSP Championship ===
==== Ten Kate Racing Yamaha (2022) ====
At 2022, Smith would make his World Superbike debut in Argentina round with the Ten Kate World Supersport team.

=== MotoAmerica King of The Baggers (2025) ===
Smith entered the King of the Baggers series in 2025 with the Harley-Davidson factory team.

== Career statistics ==
=== Grand Prix motorcycle racing ===
==== By season ====
Season	Class	Motorcycle	Team	Race	Win	Podium	Pole	FLap	Pts	Plcd
2006	125cc	Honda RS125R	Repsol Honda	14	0	0	0	0	20	19th
2007	125cc	Honda RS125R	Repsol Honda 125cc	16	0	1	0	0	101	10th
2008	125cc	Aprilia RSA 125	Polaris World	17	0	4	3	0	150	6th
2009	125cc	Aprilia RSA 125	Bancaja Aspar Team 125cc	16	2	9	3	3	223.5	**2nd**
2010	125cc	Aprilia RSA 125	Bancaja Aspar Team	17	1	6	3	1	223	4th
2011	Moto2	Tech3 Mistral 610	Tech3 Racing	16	0	3	0	1	121	7th
2012	Moto2	Tech3 Mistral 610	Tech3 Racing	17	0	0	0	0	112	9th
2013	MotoGP	Yamaha YZR-M1	Monster Yamaha Tech3	18	0	0	0	0	116	10th
2014	MotoGP	Yamaha YZR-M1	Monster Yamaha Tech3	18	0	1	0	0	121	8th
2015	MotoGP	Yamaha YZR-M1	Monster Yamaha Tech3	18	0	1	0	0	181	6th
2016	MotoGP	Yamaha YZR-M1	Monster Yamaha Tech3	15	0	0	0	0	62	17th
2017	MotoGP	KTM RC16	Red Bull KTM Factory Racing	17	0	0	0	0	29	21st
2018	MotoGP	KTM RC16	Red Bull KTM Factory Racing	18	0	0	0	0	38	18th
2019	MotoGP	Aprilia RS-GP	Aprilia Racing Team	4	0	0	0	0	0	27th
2019	Moto2	Kalex	Petronas Sprinta Racing	1	0	0	0	0	0	NC
2019	MotoE	Energica Ego Corsa	One Energy Racing	6	0	4	0	0	88	**2nd**
2020	MotoGP	Aprilia RS-GP	Aprilia Racing Team Gresini	11	0	0	0	0	12	21st
2022	MotoE	Energica Ego Corsa	WithU GRT RNF MotoE Team	5	0	0	0	0	12	18th
Total				**244**	**3**	**29**	**9**	**5**	**1609.5**	

==== By class ====
Class	Seasons	1st GP	1st Pod	1st Win	Race	Win	Podiums	Pole	FLap	Pts	WChmp
125cc	2006–2010	2006 Spain	2007 France	2009 Spain	80	3	20	9	4	717.5	0
Moto2	2011–2012, 2019	2011 Qatar	2011 Great Britain		34	0	3	0	1	233	0
MotoGP	2013–2020	2013 Qatar	2014 Australia		119	0	2	0	0	559	0
MotoE	2019, 2022	2019 Germany	2019 Germany		11	0	4	0	0	100	0
Total	2006–2020, 2022				**244**	**3**	**29**	**9**	**5**	**1609.5**	**0**

==== Races by year ====
(key) (Races in bold indicate pole position; races in italics indicate fastest lap)

Year	Class	Bike	1	2	3	4	5	6	7	8	9	10	11	12	13	14	15	16	17	18	19	Pos	Pts
2006	125cc	Honda	SPA; 17	QAT; 22	TUR; Ret	CHN; 22	FRA; 21	ITA; 19	CAT; 16	NED; 16	GBR; 12	GER; 12	CZE	MAL	AUS; 28	JPN; 8	POR; Ret	VAL; 12				19th	20
2007	125cc	Honda	QAT; 12	SPA; 26	TUR; 8	CHN; 8	FRA; 3	ITA; 8	CAT; 6	GBR; 7	NED; DNS	GER; 8	CZE; 13	RSM; 8	POR; 12	JPN; Ret	AUS; 16	MAL; 9	VAL; 8			10th	101
2008	125cc	Aprilia	**QAT**; 16	**SPA**; 3	POR; Ret	**CHN**; Ret	FRA; 2	ITA; 5	CAT; 14	GBR; 10	NED; 5	GER; 4	CZE; 6	RSM; 2	INP; 8	JPN; Ret	AUS; Ret	MAL; 2	VAL; 4			6th	150
2009	125cc	Aprilia	QAT; 5	JPN; 10	SPA; 1	FRA; 4	**ITA**; 1	CAT; 8	NED; 3	GER; Ret	**GBR**; 20	CZE; 4	INP; 2	**RSM**; 3	POR; 3	AUS; 2	MAL; 2	VAL; 2				**2nd**	**223.5**
2010	125cc	Aprilia	QAT; 8	SPA; 4	FRA; 5	ITA; 4	GBR; 3	NED; 4	CAT; 2	GER; 5	**CZE**; 6	INP; Ret	**RSM**; 4	ARA; 3	JPN; 3	MAL; 5	AUS; 5	**POR**; 3	VAL; 1			4th	223
2011	Moto2	Tech3	QAT; 9	SPA; 4	POR; 29	FRA; 9	CAT; 19	GBR; 2	NED; 3	ITA; 3	GER; Ret	CZE; Ret	INP; 4	RSM; 6	ARA; 6	JPN; 7	AUS; 18	MAL; WD	VAL; 23			7th	121
2012	Moto2	Tech3	QAT; 9	SPA; 11	POR; 10	FRA; 9	CAT; 12	GBR; 7	NED; 6	GER; 7	ITA; 4	INP; 15	CZE; 8	RSM; 8	ARA; 5	JPN; Ret	MAL; 7	AUS; 11	VAL; 16			9th	112
2013	MotoGP	Yamaha	QAT; Ret	AME; 12	SPA; 10	FRA; 9	ITA; 9	CAT; 6	NED; 9	GER; 6	USA; Ret	INP; 8	CZE; Ret	GBR; 9	RSM; 11	ARA; 7	MAL; 7	AUS; 6	JPN; 8	VAL; 7		10th	116
2014	MotoGP	Yamaha	QAT; Ret	AME; 5	ARG; 7	SPA; 8	FRA; 10	ITA; Ret	CAT; 10	NED; 8	GER; 19	INP; 6	CZE; 9	GBR; 22	RSM; 7	ARA; 5	JPN; 9	AUS; 3	MAL; 5	VAL; 14		8th	121
2015	MotoGP	Yamaha	QAT; 8	AME; 6	ARG; 6	SPA; 8	FRA; 6	ITA; 5	CAT; 5	NED; 7	GER; 6	INP; 6	CZE; 7	GBR; 7	RSM; 2	ARA; 8	JPN; 7	AUS; 10	MAL; 4	VAL; 6		6th	181
2016	MotoGP	Yamaha	QAT; 8	ARG; 8	AME; 17	SPA; 12	FRA; Ret	ITA; 7	CAT; Ret	NED; 13	GER; 13	AUT; 9	CZE; Ret	GBR	RSM	ARA	JPN; 13	AUS; 8	MAL; 14	VAL; 9		17th	62
2017	MotoGP	KTM	QAT; 17	ARG; 15	AME; 16	SPA; 14	FRA; 13	ITA; 20	CAT; DNS	NED; Ret	GER; 14	CZE; Ret	AUT; 18	GBR; 17	RSM; 10	ARA; 19	JPN; 17	AUS; 10	MAL; 12	VAL; 11		21st	29
2018	MotoGP	KTM	QAT; 18	ARG; Ret	AME; 16	SPA; 13	FRA; 14	ITA; 14	CAT; Ret	NED; 17	GER; 10	CZE; Ret	AUT; 14	GBR; C	RSM; 16	ARA; 13	THA; 15	JPN; 12	AUS; 10	MAL; 15	VAL; 8	18th	38
2019	MotoGP	Aprilia	QAT; Ret	ARG	AME	SPA; 17	FRA	ITA	CAT; Ret	NED	GER	CZE	AUT			ARA; 19	THA	JPN	AUS	MAL	VAL	27th	0
2019	Moto2	Kalex												GBR; Ret	RSM							NC	0
2019	MotoE	Energica	GER; 2	AUT; 3	RSM1; 12	RSM2; 8	VAL1; 2	VAL2; 2														**2nd**	**88**
2020	MotoGP	Aprilia	SPA; 15	ANC; 12	CZE; 17	AUT; 13	STY; 19	RSM; 19	EMI; 13	CAT; 16	FRA; Ret	ARA; 19	TER; 15	EUR	VAL	POR						21st	12
2022	MotoE	Energica	SPA1	SPA2	FRA1	FRA2	ITA1	ITA2	NED1; 8	NED2; 17	AUT1; Ret	AUT2; DNS	RSM1; 12	RSM2; 16								18th	12

=== Harley-Davidson Bagger World Cup ===
==== Races by year ====
(key) (Races in bold indicate pole position, races in italics indicate fastest lap)

Year	1		2		3		4		5		6		Pos	Pts
Year	R1	R2	R1	R2	R1	R2	R1	R2	R1	R2	R1	R2	Pos	Pts
2026	USA	USA	ITA	ITA	NED	NED	GBR; 1	GBR; 5	SPA	SPA	AUT	AUT	12th	36

=== Suzuka 8 Hours results ===
Year	Team	Co-riders	Bike	Pos
2015	(Japan) Yamaha Factory Racing Team	(Spain) Pol Espargaró (Japan) Katsuyuki Nakasuga	Yamaha YZF-R1	1st

=== Supersport World Championship ===
==== Races by year ====
(key) (Races in bold indicate pole position; races in italics indicate fastest lap)

Year	Bike	1	2	3	4	5	6	7	8	9	10	11	12	13	14	15	16	17	18	19	20	21	22	23	24	Pos	Pts
2022	Yamaha	SPA	SPA	NED	NED	POR	POR	ITA	ITA	GBR	GBR	CZE	CZE	FRA	FRA	SPA	SPA	POR	POR	ARG; 14	ARG; Ret	INA	INA	AUS	AUS	33rd	2

Sporting positions
Preceded by Leon Haslam; Takumi Takahashi; Michael van der Mark	Suzuka 8 Hours; Winner; 2015; With: Pol Espargaró; Katsuyuki Nakasuga	Succeeded by Katsuyuki Nakasuga; Alex Lowes; Pol Espargaró
