= Katsuyuki Nakasuga =

Japanese motorcycle racer

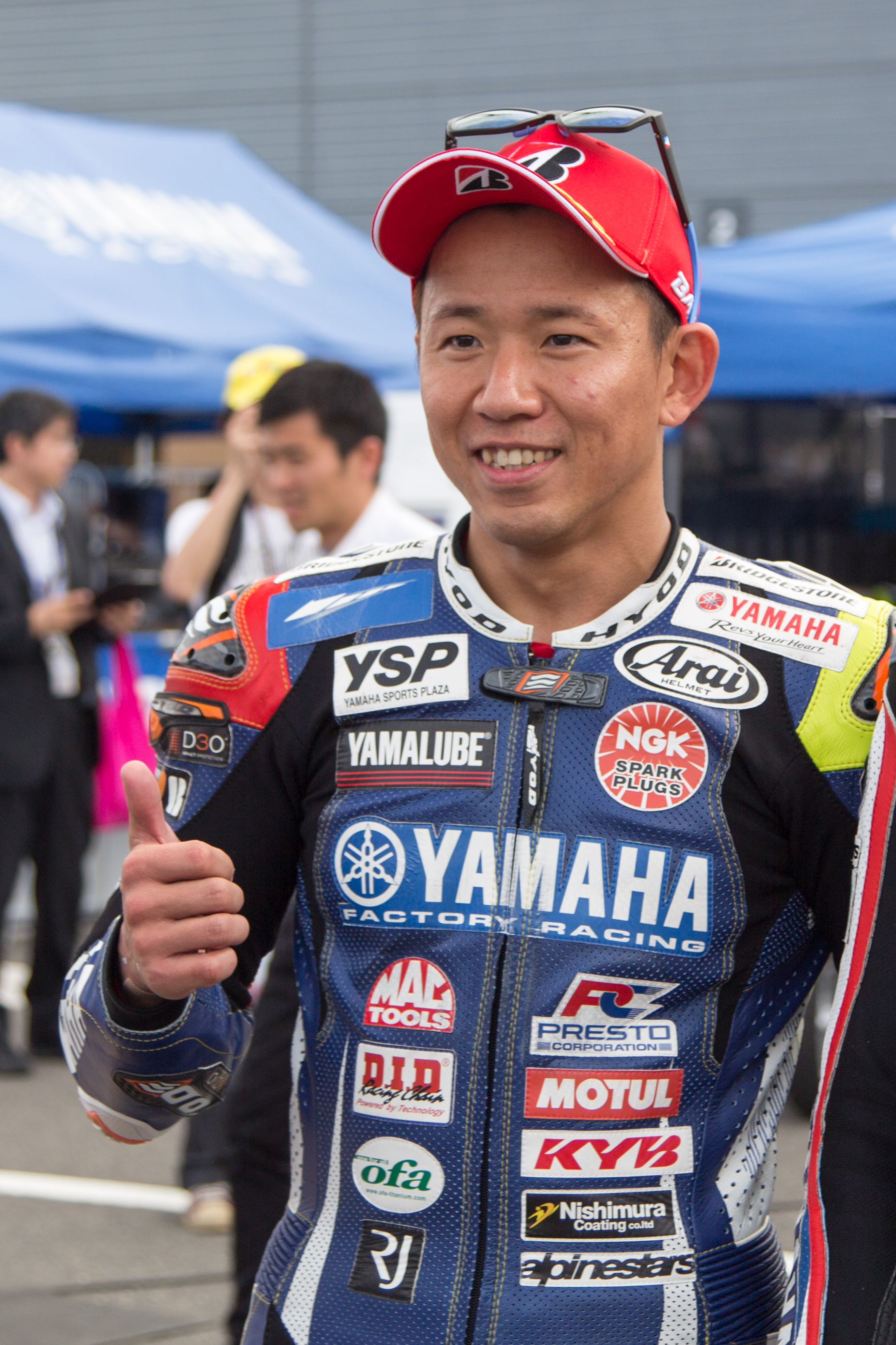
- Nakasuga in 2016
- Nationality: Japanese
- Born: 9 August 1981 (age 45); Fukuoka Prefecture, Japan
- Current team: Yamaha Factory Racing Team
- Bike number: 21
Motorcycle racing career statistics
MotoGP World Championship
Active years	2011–2018
Manufacturers	Yamaha
Championships	0
2018 championship position	26th (2 pts)
Starts / Wins / Podiums / Poles / F. laps / Points; 9 / 0 / 1 / 0 / 0 / 65
250cc World Championship
Active years	2002–2004
Manufacturers	Yamaha
Championships	0
2004 championship position	NC (0 pts)
Starts / Wins / Podiums / Poles / F. laps / Points; 3 / 0 / 0 / 0 / 0 / 4

Katsuyuki Nakasuga (Japanese: 中須賀 克行, Hepburn: Nakasuga Katsuyuki; born 9 August 1981 in Fukuoka Prefecture) is a Japanese former motorcycle racer. He races a factory Yamaha YZF-R1 in the JSB1000 class of the All Japan Road Race Championship. He has won the Suzuka 8 Hours four times (2015, 2016, 2017 and 2018) and the JSB1000 championship title thirteen times (2008, 2009, 2012, 2013, 2014, 2015, 2016, 2018, 2019, 2021, 2022, 2023 and 2025).

== Career ==
A former average competitor in the MFJ All Japan Road Race GP250 Championship between 1999 and 2004 (25th in 1999, 11th in 2000, 20th in 2001, fifth in 2002, eighth in 2003, fifth in 2004), Nakasuga moved into the All Japan Superbike Championship with the SP Tadao Racing Team in 2005, still with average results initially (12th in 2005, ninth in 2006), before joining the YSP Yamaha factory team in 2007 and finishing fourth. He then revealed himself as one of the most successful Japanese riders of all time, winning an amazing 12 JSB1000 titles between 2008 and 2023 for Yamaha (2008, 2009, 2012, 2013, 2014, 2015, 2016, 2018, 2019, 2021, 2022, 2023) losing the title only to Honda's Kousuke Akiyoshi in 2010 and 2011 (Nakasuga fourth and fifth), to Honda's Takumi Takahashi in 2017 (Nakasuga 6th), and to fellow Yamaha rider Kohta Nozane in 2020 (Nakasuga injured finishing only seventh.

Nakasuga had his premier class Grand Prix start at the Valencia circuit at the final race of the 2011 season as a replacement for the injured Jorge Lorenzo, finishing a creditable sixth place. In 2012, he made a wild-card appearance for Yamaha at his home race at Motegi, finishing ninth, before making another appearance for the factory team at Valencia, this time in place of the injured Ben Spies. Taking advantage of a wet circuit and numerous retirements ahead of him, Nakasuga was able to finish a distant second behind race winner Dani Pedrosa, becoming the only Japanese rider to score a podium finish in any class during 2012.

Nakasuga won the Suzuka 8 Hours a record setting four times in a row, in 2015 with Pol Espargaró and Bradley Smith, in 2016 with Espargaró and Alex Lowes, and in 2017 and 2018 with Lowes and Michael van der Mark.

On 27 March 2026, Nakasuga announced he would retire from the All Japan Road Race Championship after the 2026 season.

== Career statistics ==
=== Grand Prix motorcycle racing ===
==== By season ====
Season	Class	Motorcycle	Team	Race	Win	Podium	Pole	FLap	Pts	Plcd
2002	250cc	Yamaha	Technospeed Nakasuga	1	0	0	0	0	4	31st
2003	250cc	Yamaha	SP Tadao Racing Team	1	0	0	0	0	0	NC
2004	250cc	Yamaha	SP Tadao Racing Team	1	0	0	0	0	0	NC
2011	MotoGP	Yamaha	Yamaha Factory Racing	1	0	0	0	0	10	18th
2012	MotoGP	Yamaha	Yamaha YSP Racing Team; Yamaha Factory Racing	2	0	1	0	0	27	18th
2013	MotoGP	Yamaha	Yamaha YSP Racing Team	1	0	0	0	0	5	22nd
2014	MotoGP	Yamaha	Yamalube Racing Team with YSP	1	0	0	0	0	4	26th
2015	MotoGP	Yamaha	Yamaha Factory Racing Team	1	0	0	0	0	8	23rd
2016	MotoGP	Yamaha	Yamalube Yamaha Factory Racing	1	0	0	0	0	5	23rd
2017	MotoGP	Yamaha	Yamalube Yamaha Factory Racing	1	0	0	0	0	4	26th
2018	MotoGP	Yamaha	Yamalube Yamaha Factory Racing	1	0	0	0	0	2	26th
Total				**12**	**0**	**1**	**0**	**0**	**69**	

==== Races by year ====
(key) (Races in bold indicate pole position, races in italics indicate fastest lap)

Year	Class	Bike	1	2	3	4	5	6	7	8	9	10	11	12	13	14	15	16	17	18	19	Pos	Pts
2002	250cc	Yamaha	JPN	RSA	SPA	FRA	ITA	CAT	NED	GBR	GER	CZE	POR	BRA	PAC; 12	MAL	AUS	VAL				31st	4
2003	250cc	Yamaha	JPN; Ret	RSA	SPA	FRA	ITA	CAT	NED	GBR	GER	CZE	POR	BRA	PAC	MAL	AUS	VAL				NC	0
2004	250cc	Yamaha	RSA	SPA	FRA	ITA	CAT	NED	BRA	GER	GBR	CZE	POR	JPN; 20	QAT	MAL	AUS	VAL				NC	0
2011	MotoGP	Yamaha	QAT	SPA	POR	FRA	CAT	GBR	NED	ITA	GER	USA	CZE	INP	RSM	ARA	JPN	AUS	MAL; C	VAL; 6		18th	10
2012	MotoGP	Yamaha	QAT	SPA	POR	FRA	CAT	GBR	NED	GER	ITA	USA	INP	CZE	RSM	ARA	JPN; 9	MAL	AUS	VAL; 2		18th	27
2013	MotoGP	Yamaha	QAT	AME	SPA	FRA	ITA	CAT	NED	GER	USA	INP	CZE	GBR	RSM	ARA	MAL	AUS	JPN; 11	VAL		22nd	5
2014	MotoGP	Yamaha	QAT	AME	ARG	SPA	FRA	ITA	CAT	NED	GER	INP	CZE	GBR	RSM	ARA	JPN; 12	AUS	MAL	VAL		26th	4
2015	MotoGP	Yamaha	QAT	AME	ARG	SPA	FRA	ITA	CAT	NED	GER	INP	CZE	GBR	RSM	ARA	JPN; 8	AUS	MAL	VAL		23rd	8
2016	MotoGP	Yamaha	QAT	ARG	AME	SPA	FRA	ITA	CAT	NED	GER	AUT	CZE	GBR	RSM	ARA	JPN; 11	AUS	MAL	VAL		23rd	5
2017	MotoGP	Yamaha	QAT	ARG	AME	SPA	FRA	ITA	CAT	NED	GER	CZE	AUT	GBR	RSM	ARA	JPN; 12	AUS	MAL	VAL		26th	4
2018	MotoGP	Yamaha	QAT	ARG	AME	SPA	FRA	ITA	CAT	NED	GER	CZE	AUT	GBR	RSM	ARA	THA	JPN; 14	AUS	MAL	VAL	26th	2

=== FIM Endurance World Championship ===
==== By team ====
Year	Team	Bike	Rider	TC
2011	Yamaha Austria Racing Team	Yamaha YZF-R1	(Australia) Steve Martin (Slovenia) Igor Jerman (France) Gwen Giabbani (Japan) Katsuyuki Nakasuga (France) Loris Baz	5th
2012	Yamaha Austria Racing Team	Yamaha YZF-R1	(Australia) Steve Martin (Slovenia) Igor Jerman (France) Gwen Giabbani (Japan) Noriyuki Haga (Japan) Katsuyuki Nakasuga (United Kingdom) Tommy Hill	6th
2013	Yamaha Austria Racing Team	Yamaha YZF-R1	(Australia) Broc Parkes (Slovenia) Igor Jerman (South Africa) Sheridan Morais (Australia) Josh Waters (Japan) Katsuyuki Nakasuga (United States) Josh Hayes	5th

=== Suzuka 8 Hours results ===
Year	Team	Co-riders	Bike	Pos
2011	Monster Energy Yamaha – YART	(France) Gwen Giabbani (Slovenia) Igor Jerman	Yamaha YZF-R1	Ret
2012	Monster Energy Yamaha – YART	(Japan) Noriyuki Haga (United Kingdom) Tommy Hill	Yamaha YZF-R1	Ret
2013	Monster Energy Yamaha – YART	(Australia) Broc Parkes (Australia) Josh Waters	Yamaha YZF-R1	8th
2014	Monster Energy Yamaha – YART	(Australia) Broc Parkes (Australia) Josh Brookes	Yamaha YZF-R1	4th
2015	(Japan) Yamaha Factory Racing Team	(Spain) Pol Espargaró (United Kingdom) Bradley Smith	Yamaha YZF-R1	1st
2016	(Japan) Yamaha Factory Racing Team	(Spain) Pol Espargaró (United Kingdom) Alex Lowes	Yamaha YZF-R1	1st
2017	(Japan) Yamaha Factory Racing Team	(United Kingdom) Alex Lowes (Netherlands) Michael van der Mark	Yamaha YZF-R1	1st
2018	(Japan) Yamaha Factory Racing Team	(United Kingdom) Alex Lowes (Netherlands) Michael van der Mark	Yamaha YZF-R1	1st
2019	(Japan) Yamaha Factory Racing Team	(United Kingdom) Alex Lowes (Netherlands) Michael van der Mark	Yamaha YZF-R1	2nd
2025	(Japan) Yamaha Racing Team	(Australia) Jack Miller (Italy) Andrea Locatelli	Yamaha YZF-R1	2nd
2026	(Japan) Yamaha Racing Team	(Australia) Jack Miller (Italy) Andrea Locatelli	Yamaha YZF-R1	2nd

=== All Japan Road Race Championship ===
==== Races by year ====
(key) (Races in bold indicate pole position; races in italics indicate fastest lap)

Year	Class	Bike	1	2	3	4	5	6	7	8	9	10	11	Pos	Pts
2024	JSB1000	Yamaha	SUZ; 1	**MOT1**; 1	MOT2; 1	SUG1; 1	SUG2; 3	MOT; 2	**AUT1**; 2	AUT2; 2	**OKA**; 3	SUZ1; 3	SUZ2; 16†	2nd	211
2025	JSB1000	Yamaha	MOT; 2	SUG1; 1	**SUG2**; 1	MOT1; 2	**MOT2**; 2	**AUT1**; 1	**AUT2**; 1	OKA; 1	SUZ1; DNS	SUZ2; DNS		1st	185
2026	JSB1000	Yamaha	MOT; Ret	SUG1; 2	SUG2; 2	**AUT1**; 2	**AUT2**; 2	MOT1; 3	MOT2; 4	OKA; Ret	SUZ1; 2	SUZ2; 1		2nd	160

Sporting positions
Preceded by Leon Haslam; Takumi Takahashi; Michael van der Mark	Suzuka 8 Hours; Winner; 2015–2018; With: Pol Espargaró (2015–2016); Bradley Smith (2015); Alex Lowes (2016–2018); Michael van der Mark (2017–2018)	Succeeded by Leon Haslam; Toprak Razgatlıoğlu; Jonathan Rea
