= Pol Espargaró =

Spanish motorcycle racer (born 1991)

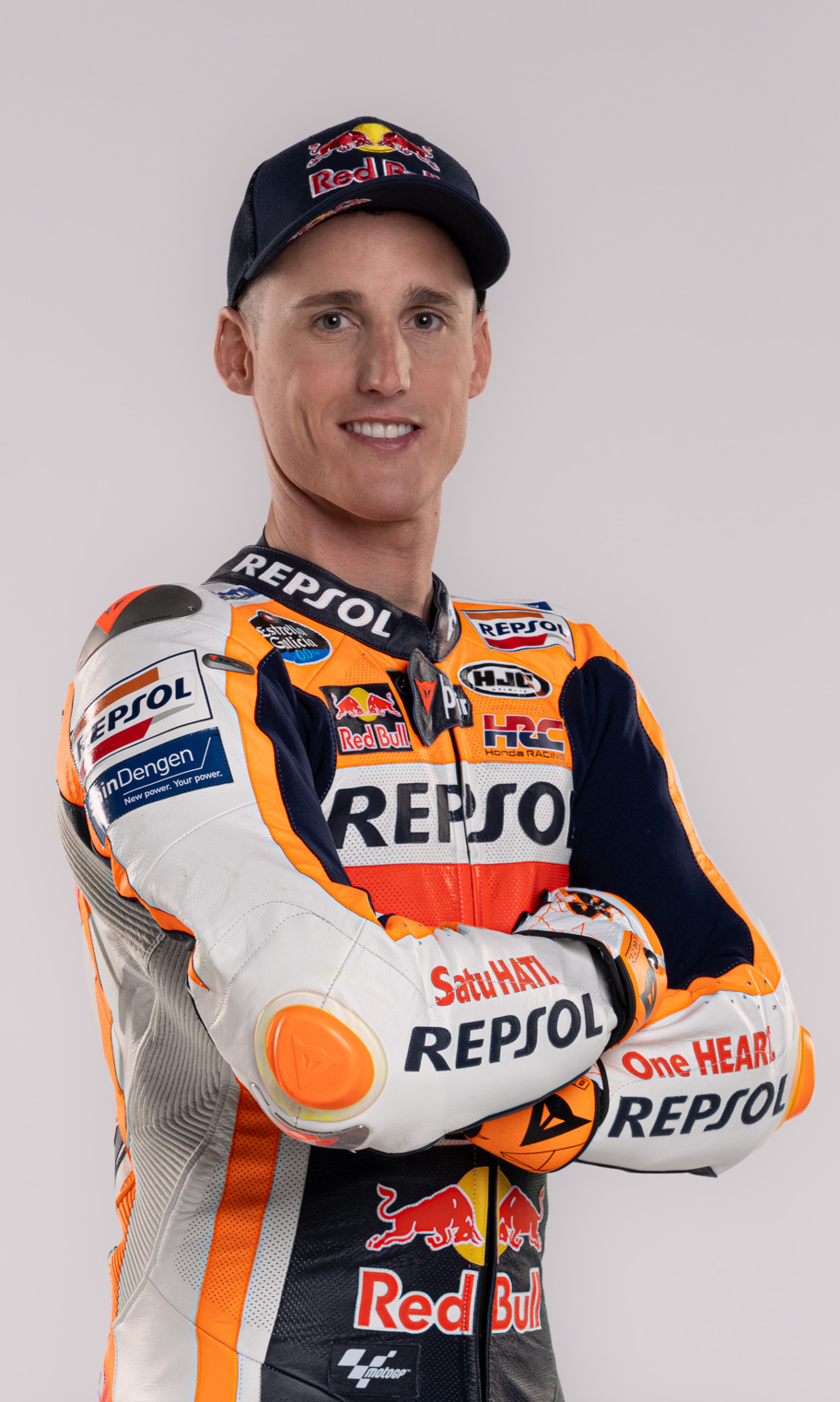
- Espargaró in 2022
- Nationality: Spanish
- Born: 10 June 1991 (age 35); Granollers, Spain
- Current team: Red Bull KTM Factory Racing (test rider)
- Bike number: 44
Motorcycle racing career statistics
MotoGP World Championship
Active years	2014–2025
Manufacturers	Yamaha (2014–2016); KTM (2017–2020, 2023–2026); Honda (2021–2022)
Championships	0
2025 championship position	22nd (29 pts)
Starts / Wins / Podiums / Poles / F. laps / Points; 174 / 0 / 8 / 3 / 1 / 931
Moto2 World Championship
Active years	2011–2013
Manufacturers	FTR (2011); Kalex (2012–2013)
Championships	1 (2013)
2013 championship position	1st (265 pts)
Starts / Wins / Podiums / Poles / F. laps / Points; 51 / 10 / 23 / 14 / 10 / 609
125cc World Championship
Active years	2006–2010
Manufacturers	Derbi (2006, 2008–2010); Aprilia (2007)
Championships	0
2010 championship position	3rd (281 pts)
Starts / Wins / Podiums / Poles / F. laps / Points; 71 / 5 / 21 / 3 / 5 / 708.5

Pol Espargaró Villà (Catalan pronunciation: [ˈpɔl əspəɾɣəˈɾo βiˈʎa]; born 10 June 1991) is a Spanish Grand Prix motorcycle racer who for 2023 rode in the MotoGP class for the newly named GasGas Factory Racing team, a development of Tech3 using KTM machines, after which he will be a test rider within the KTM organisation. He previously spent two years with Repsol Honda Team.

Espargaró is the younger brother of fellow MotoGP rider Aleix Espargaró, and is best known for winning the 2013 Moto2 World Championship. This earned him a move to Monster Yamaha Tech3 in 2014, until 2017 where he signed for Red Bull KTM Factory Racing and secured a maiden podium at the 2018 Valencian Community motorcycle Grand Prix.

Espargaró won the Suzuka 8 Hours in 2015 with Bradley Smith and Katsuyuki Nakasuga, and in 2016 with Nakasuga and Alex Lowes. He is the first rider to finish on the podium riding a KTM motorcycle in MotoGP.

== Career ==
=== 125cc World Championship ===
==== Youngest rider to score a championship point (2006) ====
Born in Granollers, Barcelona, Espargaró, arrived in the 125cc World Championship in 2006 participating in the last six races of the year. This rider from replaced the injured Andrea Iannone at Campetella Racing and made his debut on board a Derbi at the Czech Republic Grand Prix. Two months before, Espargaró had made history as a wildcard in the Catalan Grand Prix when he finished 13th to become the youngest ever point scorer in a Grand Prix at the age of just 15 years and 8 days. He ended the season winning five consecutive races in Spanish 125cc Championship to become champion, followed by a 6th-place finish at the Valencian Grand Prix.

==== First podium (2007) ====
In 2007, Espargaró aimed to further enhance the family reputation over a full season with Campetella Racing Junior Aprilia. The season start with two good results, a seventh in Qatar and fourth at Jerez, then a couple of Top 10s until the Catalan round where he finished fifth. Espargaró's turning point came in the Czech Republic where he finished in sixth place, before a top five in San Marino. The Portuguese race was the highlight point of his short career, claiming a third-place finish from seventh on the grid. Espargaró battled for the lead with Héctor Faubel and Gábor Talmácsi, finishing just 0.2 seconds behind Faubel, who won.

==== Return to Derbi (2008–2010) ====
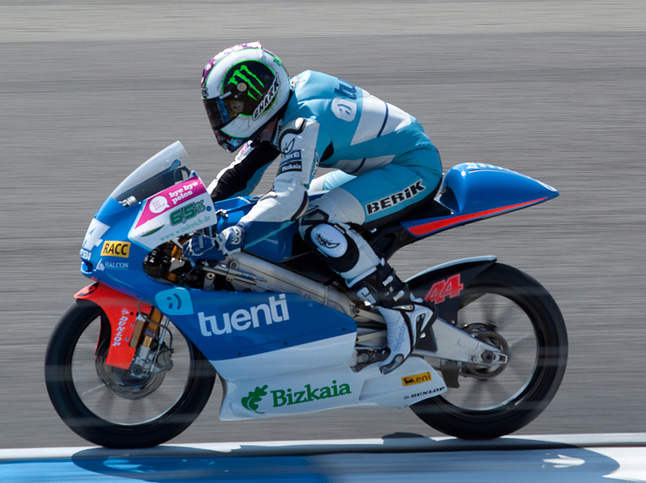
Espargaró at the 2010 Dutch TT

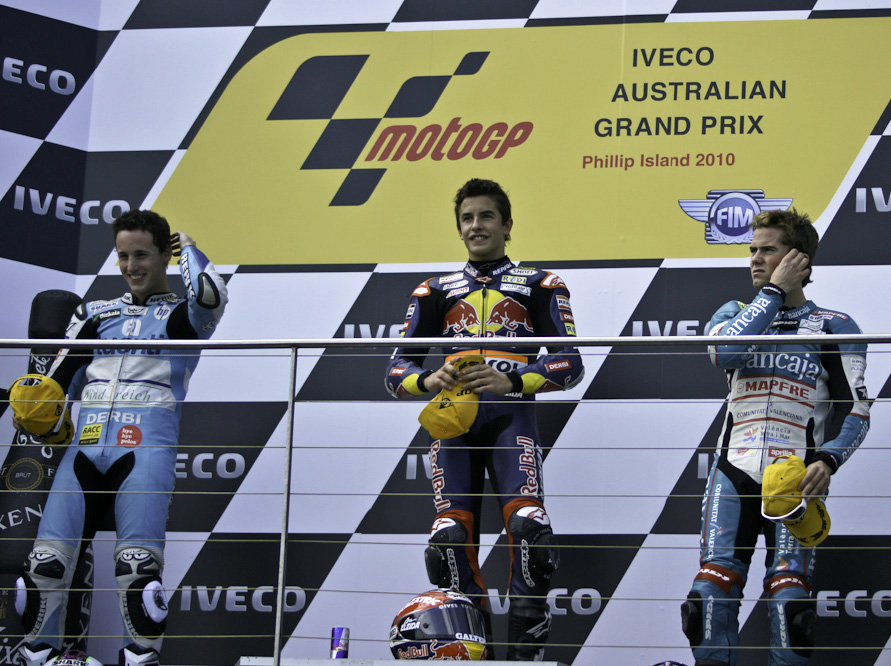
Espargaró (left) at the 2010 Australian Grand Prix

After running last year on board an Aprilia RS125 in Belson Campetella, Espargaró switched the Aprilia for the Derbi, in this occasion an RSA and partnered by Joan Olivé. He ended up ninth in the championship, with three podiums and two poles.

=== Moto2 World Championship ===
==== Pons Racing (2011–2013) ====
===== 2011 =====
In 2011, Espargaró moved to Moto2 with the HP Tuenti Speed Up team with an FTR M211, obtaining second place in Indianapolis and third place in Malaysia and finishing the season in 13th place with 75 points.

===== 2012 =====
In 2012, Espargaró moved to the Pons 40 HP Tuenti team. He finished third in Qatar. He got his first win in the Moto2 class in Spain. In Portugal, he came second. He won in Great Britain, he came second in Italy and Indianapolis and third in the Czech Republic after starting on all occasions from pole position. In the San Marino Grand Prix, he came second. He Won in Aragon. In Japan, he came second after starting from pole position. He got pole position in Malaysia. He won in Australia after starting from pole position. He got another pole position in the Valencian grand Prix. He ended the season in second place with 269 points.

===== 2013 =====
In 2013, Espargaró remained in the same team, obtaining six wins (Qatar, Catalonia, Netherlands, San Marino, Australia and Japan), a second place in Malaysia, two third places (Germany and Aragon) and six pole positions (Qatar, Catalonia, Netherlands, San Marino, Australia and the Valencian Community). He became the world champion with 265 points.

=== MotoGP World Championship ===
==== Monster Yamaha Tech3 (2014–2016) ====
===== 2014 =====
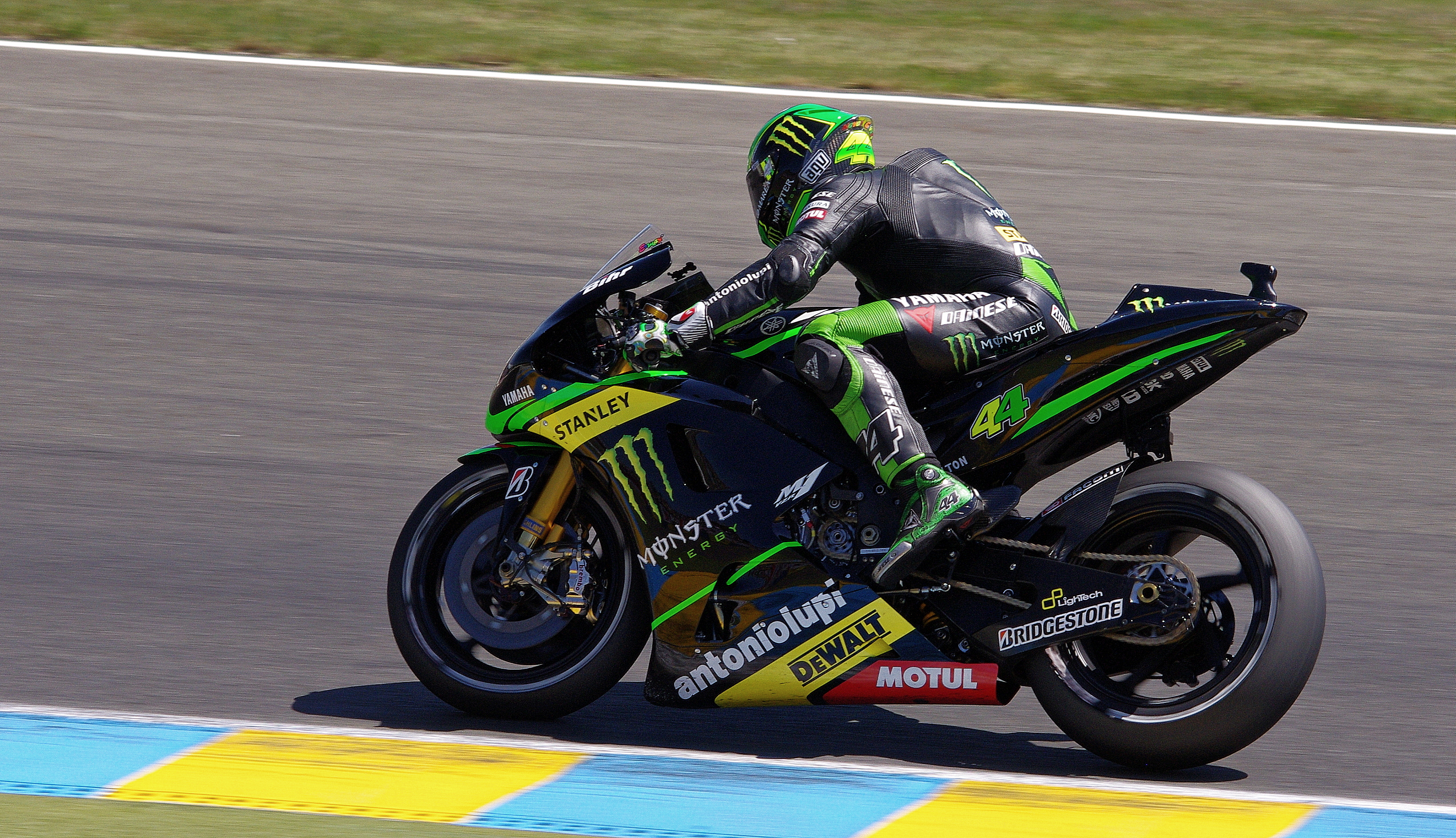
Espargaró at the 2014 French Grand Prix

In May 2013, rumours appeared linking Espargaró with the MotoGP Tech 3 satellite Yamaha racing team, to replace British rider Cal Crutchlow. After Crutchlow signed a two-year deal with the factory Ducati team, Espargaró signed a two-year deal with Yamaha, the first year of which would be with Tech 3. He got his first points in the premier class in the United States. His best result was a fourth place in France and he ended the season in sixth place with 136 points, also achieving Rookie of The Year and Top Independent Rider.

===== 2015 =====
Espargaró remained with Tech 3 into the 2015 season, finishing in ninth place in the final championship standings. In 2015, he also won the Suzuka 8 Hours, alternating with Bradley Smith and Katsuyuki Nakasuga driving the Yamaha YZF-R1. He thus becomes the second Spanish driver to win this race, after Carlos Checa.

===== 2016 =====
Espargaró again remained with Tech 3 into the 2016 season, where he finished eighth in the standings with 134 points and his best finish of fourth came at the Dutch TT. At the end of 2016, Espargaró and Yamaha split.

==== Red Bull KTM Factory Racing (2017–2020) ====
===== 2017 =====
Prior to the 2016 Catalan Grand Prix, it was announced that Espargaró would join the factory-supported KTM team for the 2017 season. He partnered Bradley Smith in the team, with both riders moving across from the Tech 3 outfit. His best result is a ninth place in the Czech Republic. He ended the season in 17th place with 55 points.

===== 2018 =====
In 2018, Espargaró remained in the same team, obtaining a third place in the Valencian grand Prix and ending the season in 14th place with 51 points. This season, he was forced to miss the Grand Prix of the Czech Republic, Austria and Great Britain as he fractured his left collarbone in the warm up of the Czech Republic GP and the Aragon Grand Prix for a new fracture of the same bone remedied in free practice of the GP. In the Valencian Community Grand Prix, he achieved his first podium in MotoGP, a third place. He closed the season in 14th place in the drivers' standings

===== 2019 =====
Espargaró's season in 2019 did not build on the expectations created at the end of the 2018 season where he and KTM achieved their debut podium. He scored KTMs first dry front row start in Misano, and KTMs best dry result in Le Mans where he finished in sixth place, 5.9 seconds behind the race winner. Espargaró finished the 2019 season 11th in the standings with 100 points.

===== 2020 =====
Espargaró finished the 2020 MotoGP season fifth in the standings level on points with Andrea Dovizoso, he made history by taking KTMs first pole position at the Styrian Grand Prix, another pole at the Valencian Community motorcycle Grand Prix and a total of five podiums in the 2020 season. At the end of 2020, he left Redbull KTM for Repsol Honda.

==== Repsol Honda Team (2021–2022) ====
===== 2021 =====
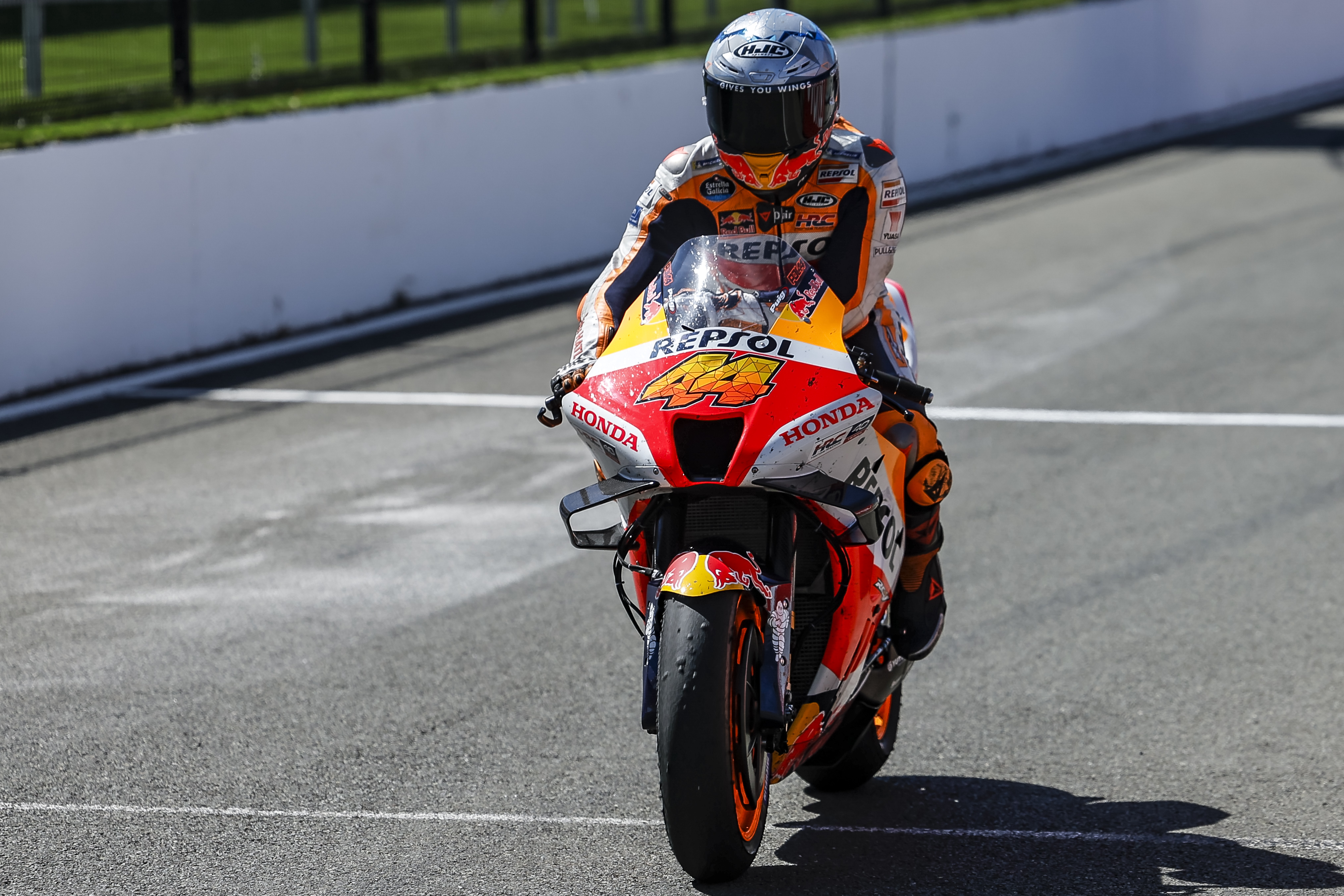
Espargaró at the 2022 British Grand Prix

Espargaró made his Repsol Honda debut at the Qatar motorcycle Grand Prix, finishing eighth on the first of the two races and 12th on the latter. He took several points scoring finishes throughout the season, but the highlights were his fifth place finish from pole position at the 2021 British motorcycle Grand Prix, and a second place finish behind teammate Marc Márquez in Emilia Romagna.Espargaró ended the season 12th in the championship on 100 points.

===== 2022 =====
Espargaró started the 2022 season with a third place finish at the Qatar Grand Prix. However, from then on, due to various factors both in and out of his control, Espargaró's performances have resulted in few, and low-points scoring finishes.

==== GasGas Factory Racing Tech3 (2023) ====
After initial uncertainty, Espargaró announced at the Austrian Grand Prix in August that he had signed a two-year deal with Tech 3 KTM Factory Racing, to be known as GasGas Factory Racing team from the 2023 season onwards - rejoined with Tech3 for the first time since 2016. His seat at Repsol Honda was allocated to 2020 World Champion Joan Mir. The reported reason for this signing was Mir's younger age compared to that of Espargaró.

Espargaró received substantial injuries in a practice crash at the Portimão Circuit on the Friday before the initial race weekend of the 2023 season, and was unable to compete. He returned home to Spain after hospitalisation in Faro, Portugal.

With a lengthy recovery time anticipated, the team nominated KTM employee Jonas Folger as replacement rider from the season third-round at the COTA race weekend on 15–16 April, and onwards as required. Espargaró made his return at the British Grand Prix in August, and late in the year confirmed he will be a test rider within the KTM organisation with the possibility of some wildcard races during 2024. His seat was taken by Pedro Acosta. Espargaró's final full-time MotoGP season ended with a 14th placed finish at the Valencian Community Grand Prix, 23rd overall in the rider standings.

In 2024, Espargaró was entered as a KTM wildcard rider in the Italian Grand Prix, finishing 17th in the main race. He featured again as a wildcard at the Austrian Grand Prix with 9th in the sprint race. The following day, he finished 11th in the main race. Espargaró also raced in Misano, finishing 10th in the main feature race.

==== Red Bull KTM Tech3 (2025–) ====
Espargaró was signed as a test and reserve rider for the Red Bull KTM Tech3 team in 2025. He deputised for Maverick Viñales, who sustained a shoulder injury in the German round, at the Czech Grand Prix, where he finished 9th in both the sprint and main race, and also raced in Hungary. He deputised for Viñales again for the Australian and Malaysian Grand Prix.

Espargaró replaced Viñales again in 2026 for the British, Aragon, San Marino Grand Prix and Austrian Grand Prix.

== Career statistics ==
=== Grand Prix motorcycle racing ===
==== By season ====
Season	Class	Motorcycle	Team	Race	Win	Podium	Pole	FLap	Pts	Plcd	WCh
2006	125cc	Derbi	Campetella Racing Junior	6	0	0	0	0	19	20th	–
2006	125cc	Derbi	RACC Derbi	1	0	0	0	0	19	20th	–
2007	125cc	Aprilia	Belson Campetella Racing	17	0	1	0	0	110	9th	–
2008	125cc	Derbi	Belson Derbi	14	0	3	2	1	124	9th	–
2009	125cc	Derbi	Derbi Racing Team	16	2	5	1	1	174.5	4th	–
2010	125cc	Derbi	Derbi Tuenti Racing	17	3	12	0	3	281	**3rd**	–
2011	Moto2	FTR	HP Tuenti Speed Up	17	0	2	0	1	75	13th	–
2012	Moto2	Kalex	Pons 40 HP Tuenti	17	4	11	8	5	269	**2nd**	–
2013	Moto2	Kalex	Tuenti HP 40	17	6	10	6	4	265	**1st**	1
2014	MotoGP	Yamaha	Monster Yamaha Tech3	18	0	0	0	0	136	6th	–
2015	MotoGP	Yamaha	Monster Yamaha Tech3	18	0	0	0	0	114	9th	–
2016	MotoGP	Yamaha	Monster Yamaha Tech3	17	0	0	0	0	134	8th	–
2017	MotoGP	KTM	Red Bull KTM Factory Racing	18	0	0	0	0	55	17th	–
2018	MotoGP	KTM	Red Bull KTM Factory Racing	15	0	1	0	0	51	14th	–
2019	MotoGP	KTM	Red Bull KTM Factory Racing	18	0	0	0	0	100	11th	–
2020	MotoGP	KTM	Red Bull KTM Factory Racing	14	0	5	2	1	135	5th	–
2021	MotoGP	Honda	Repsol Honda Team	17	0	1	1	0	100	12th	–
2022	MotoGP	Honda	Repsol Honda Team	19	0	1	0	0	56	16th	–
2023	MotoGP	KTM	GasGas Factory Racing Tech3	12	0	0	0	0	15	23rd	–
2024	MotoGP	KTM	Red Bull KTM Factory Racing	3	0	0	0	0	12	23rd	–
2025	MotoGP	KTM	Red Bull KTM Tech3	5	0	0	0	0	23	22nd	–
2026	MotoGP	KTM	Red Bull KTM Tech3	0	0	0	0	0	0*	NC*	–
Total				**296**	**15**	**52**	**20**	**16**	**2248.5**		**1**

==== By class ====
Class	Seasons	1st GP	1st Pod	1st Win	Race	Win	Podiums	Pole	FLap	Pts	WChmp
125cc	2006–2010	2006 Catalunya	2007 Portugal	2009 Indianapolis	71	5	21	3	5	708.5	0
Moto2	2011–2013	2011 Qatar	2011 Indianapolis	2012 Spain	51	10	23	14	10	609	1
MotoGP	2014–present	2014 Qatar	2018 Valencia		174	0	8	3	1	931	0
Total	2006–present				**296**	**15**	**52**	**20**	**16**	**2248.5**	**1**

==== Races by year ====
(key) (Races in bold indicate pole position, races in italics indicate fastest lap)

Year	Class	Bike	1	2	3	4	5	6	7	8	9	10	11	12	13	14	15	16	17	18	19	20	21	22	Pos	Pts
2006	125cc	Derbi	SPA	QAT	TUR	CHN	FRA	ITA	CAT; 13	NED	GBR	GER	CZE; Ret	MAL; 14	AUS; 16	JPN; 19	POR; 12	VAL; 6							20th	19
2007	125cc	Aprilia	QAT; 7	SPA; 4	TUR; 11	CHN; 9	FRA; 11	ITA; 9	CAT; 5	GBR; Ret	NED; 11	GER; Ret	CZE; 6	RSM; 5	POR; 3	JPN; Ret	AUS; 11	MAL; Ret	VAL; 10						9th	110
2008	125cc	Derbi	QAT; 8	SPA; 14	POR; 13	CHN; 4	FRA; 4	ITA; 3	**CAT**; 2	GBR; DNS	NED	GER; 16	CZE; 8	RSM; Ret	**INP**; 2	JPN; Ret	AUS; 5	MAL; 6	VAL; DNS						9th	124
2009	125cc	Derbi	QAT; 4	JPN; 3	SPA; 7	FRA; Ret	ITA; 4	CAT; Ret	NED; 9	GER; 5	GBR; 10	CZE; 5	INP; 1	RSM; Ret	POR; 1	**AUS**; 4	MAL; 3	VAL; 3							4th	174.5
2010	125cc	Derbi	QAT; 4	SPA; 1	FRA; 1	ITA; 3	GBR; 2	NED; 3	CAT; 3	GER; Ret	CZE; 2	INP; 3	RSM; 6	ARA; 1	JPN; 4	MAL; 2	AUS; 2	POR; 10	VAL; 2						3rd	281
2011	Moto2	FTR	QAT; 22	SPA; 20	POR; 6	FRA; 13	CAT; 16	GBR; Ret	NED; Ret	ITA; 28	GER; 13	CZE; 16	INP; 2	RSM; 9	ARA; 14	JPN; 15	AUS; 5	MAL; 3	VAL; 14						13th	75
2012	Moto2	Kalex	QAT; 3	SPA; 1	POR; 2	FRA; 6	CAT; Ret	**GBR**; 1	NED; Ret	GER; 4	**ITA**; 2	**INP**; 2	**CZE**; 3	RSM; 2	ARA; 1	**JPN**; 2	**MAL**; 10	**AUS**; 1	**VAL**; 8						2nd	269
2013	Moto2	Kalex	**QAT**; 1	AME; Ret	SPA; 3	FRA; 19	ITA; 4	**CAT**; 1	**NED**; 1	GER; 3	INP; 4	CZE; 4	GBR; 8	**RSM**; 1	ARA; 3	MAL; 2	**AUS**; 1	JPN; 1	**VAL**; 29						1st	265
2014	MotoGP	Yamaha	QAT; Ret	AME; 6	ARG; 8	SPA; 9	FRA; 4	ITA; 5	CAT; 7	NED; Ret	GER; 7	INP; 5	CZE; Ret	GBR; 6	RSM; 6	ARA; 6	JPN; 8	AUS; Ret	MAL; 6	VAL; 6					6th	136
2015	MotoGP	Yamaha	QAT; 9	AME; Ret	ARG; 8	SPA; 5	FRA; 7	ITA; 6	CAT; Ret	NED; 5	GER; 8	INP; 7	CZE; 8	GBR; Ret	RSM; Ret	ARA; 9	JPN; Ret	AUS; 8	MAL; 9	VAL; 5					9th	114
2016	MotoGP	Yamaha	QAT; 7	ARG; 6	AME; 7	SPA; 8	FRA; 5	ITA; 15	CAT; 5	NED; 4	GER; Ret	AUT; 10	CZE; 13	GBR; DNS	RSM; 9	ARA; 8	JPN; 6	AUS; 5	MAL; 9	VAL; 6					8th	134
2017	MotoGP	KTM	QAT; 16	ARG; 14	AME; Ret	SPA; Ret	FRA; 12	ITA; Ret	CAT; 18	NED; 11	GER; 13	CZE; 9	AUT; Ret	GBR; 11	RSM; 11	ARA; 10	JPN; 11	AUS; 9	MAL; 10	VAL; Ret					17th	55
2018	MotoGP	KTM	QAT; Ret	ARG; 11	AME; 13	SPA; 11	FRA; 11	ITA; 11	CAT; 11	NED; 12	GER; Ret	CZE; DNS	AUT	GBR	RSM; Ret	ARA; DNS	THA; 21	JPN; 13	AUS; Ret	MAL; Ret	VAL; 3				14th	51
2019	MotoGP	KTM	QAT; 12	ARG; 10	AME; 8	SPA; 13	FRA; 6	ITA; 9	CAT; 7	NED; 11	GER; 12	CZE; 11	AUT; Ret	GBR; 9	RSM; 7	ARA; DNS	THA; 13	JPN; 11	AUS; 12	MAL; 11	VAL; 10				11th	100
2020	MotoGP	KTM	SPA; 6	ANC; 7	CZE; Ret	AUT; Ret	**STY**; 3	RSM; 10	EMI; 3	CAT; Ret	FRA; 3	ARA; 12	TER; 4	**EUR**; 3	VAL; 3	POR; 4									5th	135
2021	MotoGP	Honda	QAT; 8	DOH; 13	POR; Ret	SPA; 10	FRA; 8	ITA; 12	CAT; Ret	GER; 10	NED; 10	STY; 16	AUT; 16	**GBR**; 5	ARA; 13	RSM; 7	AME; 10	EMI; 2	ALR; 6	VAL; DNS					12th	100
2022	MotoGP	Honda	QAT; 3	INA; 12	ARG; Ret	AME; 13	POR; 9	SPA; 11	FRA; 11	ITA; Ret	CAT; 17	GER; Ret	NED; DNS	GBR; 14	AUT; 16	RSM; Ret	ARA; 15	JPN; 12	THA; 14	AUS; 11	MAL; 14	VAL; Ret			16th	56
2023	MotoGP	KTM	POR; DNS	ARG	AME	SPA	FRA	ITA	GER	NED	GBR; 12	AUT; 16^{6}	CAT; Ret	RSM; Ret	IND; 13	JPN; 15	INA; Ret	AUS; 18	THA; 18	MAL; 15	QAT; 18	VAL; 14			23rd	15
2024	MotoGP	KTM	QAT	POR	AME	SPA	FRA	CAT	ITA; 17	NED	GER	GBR	AUT; 11^{9}	CAT	RSM; 10	EMI	INA	JPN	AUS	THA	MAL	SLD			23rd	12
2025	MotoGP	KTM	THA	ARG	AME	QAT	SPA	FRA	GBR	ARA	ITA	NED	GER	CZE; 9^{9}	AUT	HUN; 8	CAT	RSM	JPN	INA	AUS; 10^{9}	MAL; Ret	POR; 10	VAL	22nd	29
2026	MotoGP	KTM	THA	BRA	USA	SPA	FRA	CAT	ITA	HUN	CZE	NED	GER	GBR; 13	ARA	RSM	AUT	JPN	INA	AUS	MAL	QAT	POR	VAL	23th*	3*

=== Suzuka 8 Hours results ===
Year	Team	Co-riders	Bike	Pos
2015	(Japan) Yamaha Factory Racing Team	(Japan) Katsuyuki Nakasuga (United Kingdom) Bradley Smith	Yamaha YZF-R1	1st
2016	(Japan) Yamaha Factory Racing Team	(Japan) Katsuyuki Nakasuga (United Kingdom) Alex Lowes	Yamaha YZF-R1	1st

Sporting positions
Preceded by Mateo Túnez	Spanish 125cc Champion; 2006	Succeeded by Stefan Bradl
Preceded by Takumi Takahashi; Michael van der Mark; Leon Haslam	Suzuka 8 Hours; Winner; 2015, 2016; With: Katsuyuki Nakasuga (2015, 2016); Bradley Smith (2015); Alex Lowes (2016)	Succeeded by Katsuyuki Nakasuga; Alex Lowes; Michael van der Mark
