= 2018 Japanese motorcycle Grand Prix =

(Japan) 2018 Japanese Grand Prix
Race details
- Race 16 of 19 races in the 2018 Grand Prix motorcycle racing season
- Date: 21 October 2018
- Official name: Motul Grand Prix of Japan
- Location: Twin Ring Motegi, Motegi, Japan
- Course: Permanent racing facility; 4.801 km (2.983 mi)

MotoGP
Pole position
Rider	(Italy) Andrea Dovizioso	Ducati
Time	1:44.590	
Fastest lap
Rider	(Spain) Marc Márquez	Honda
Time	1:45.646 on lap 19	
Podium
First	(Spain) Marc Márquez	Honda
Second	(United Kingdom) Cal Crutchlow	Honda
Third	(Spain) Álex Rins	Suzuki

Moto2
Pole position
Rider	(Italy) Francesco Bagnaia	Kalex
Time	1:50.759	
Fastest lap
Rider	(Italy) Francesco Bagnaia	Kalex
Time	1:51.367 on lap 11	
Podium
First	(Italy) Francesco Bagnaia	Kalex
Second	(Italy) Lorenzo Baldassarri	Kalex
Third	(Portugal) Miguel Oliveira	KTM

Moto3
Pole position
Rider	(Argentina) Gabriel Rodrigo	KTM
Time	1:56.894	
Fastest lap
Rider	(South Africa) Darryn Binder	KTM
Time	1:57.361 on lap 2	
Podium
First	(Italy) Marco Bezzecchi	KTM
Second	(Italy) Lorenzo Dalla Porta	Honda
Third	(South Africa) Darryn Binder	KTM

The 2018 Japanese motorcycle Grand Prix was the sixteenth round of the 2018 MotoGP season. It was held at the Twin Ring Motegi in Motegi on 21 October 2018. Marc Márquez clinched his third consecutive MotoGP title after Andrea Dovizioso crashed during the penultimate lap. This is his fifth championship in the premier class and seventh overall.

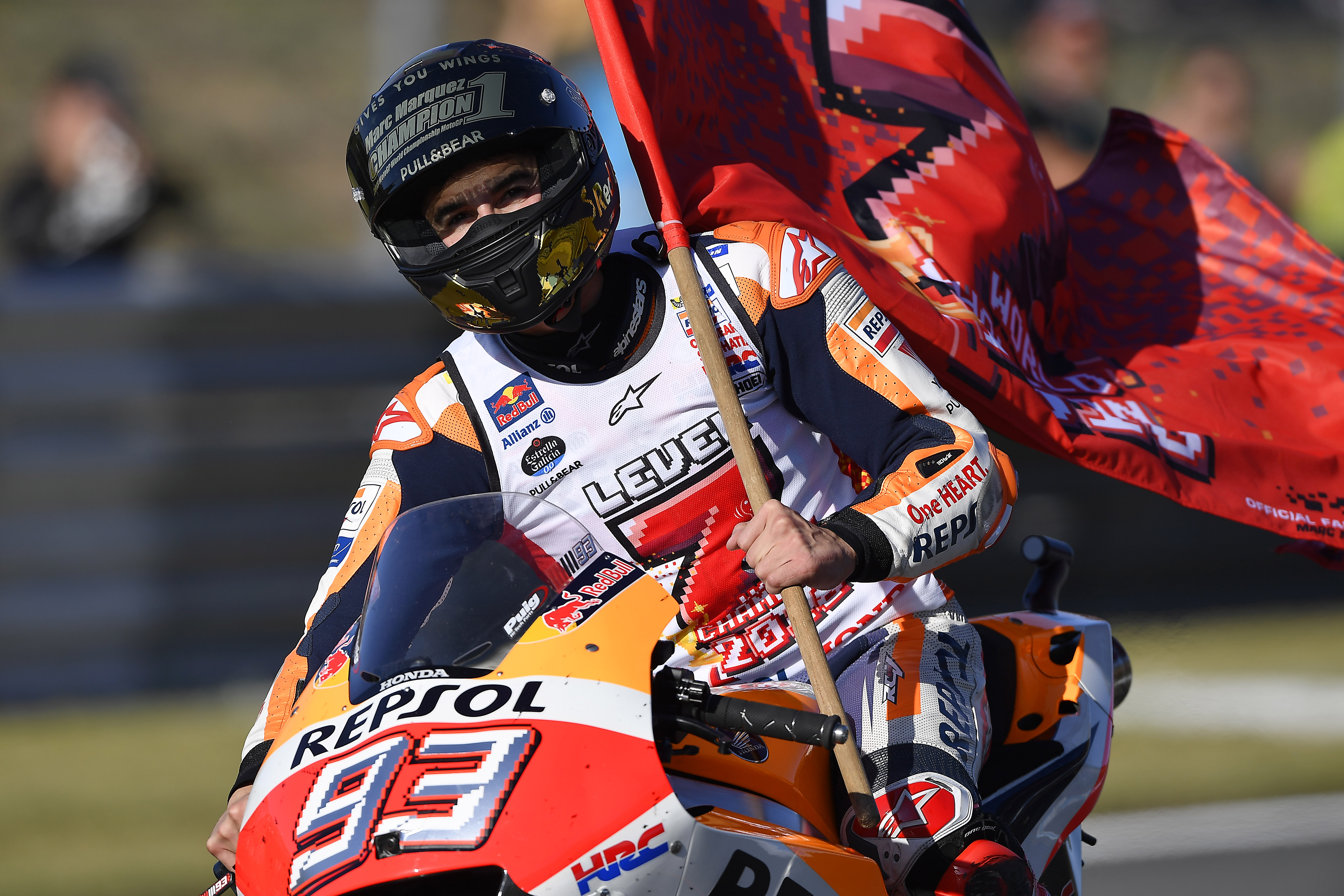
Marc Márquez, celebrating after winning the MotoGP race.

== Classification ==
=== MotoGP ===
Pos.	No.	Rider	Team	Manufacturer	Laps	Time/Retired	Grid	Points
1	93	(Spain) Marc Márquez	Repsol Honda Team	Honda	24	42:36.438	6	25
2	35	(United Kingdom) Cal Crutchlow	LCR Honda Castrol	Honda	24	+1.573	4	20
3	42	(Spain) Álex Rins	Team Suzuki Ecstar	Suzuki	24	+1.720	8	16
4	46	(Italy) Valentino Rossi	Movistar Yamaha MotoGP	Yamaha	24	+6.413	9	13
5	19	(Spain) Álvaro Bautista	Ángel Nieto Team	Ducati	24	+6.919	10	11
6	5	(France) Johann Zarco	Monster Yamaha Tech 3	Yamaha	24	+8.024	2	10
7	25	(Spain) Maverick Viñales	Movistar Yamaha MotoGP	Yamaha	24	+13.330	7	9
8	26	(Spain) Dani Pedrosa	Repsol Honda Team	Honda	24	+15.582	11	8
9	9	(Italy) Danilo Petrucci	Alma Pramac Racing	Ducati	24	+20.584	15	7
10	55	(Malaysia) Hafizh Syahrin	Monster Yamaha Tech 3	Yamaha	24	+24.985	16	6
11	21	(Italy) Franco Morbidelli	EG 0,0 Marc VDS	Honda	24	+25.931	17	5
12	38	(United Kingdom) Bradley Smith	Red Bull KTM Factory Racing	KTM	24	+26.875	13	4
13	44	(Spain) Pol Espargaró	Red Bull KTM Factory Racing	KTM	24	+27.069	14	3
14	89	(Japan) Katsuyuki Nakasuga	Yamalube Yamaha Factory Racing	Yamaha	24	+32.550	20	2
15	30	(Japan) Takaaki Nakagami	LCR Honda Idemitsu	Honda	24	+37.718	12	1
16	10	(Belgium) Xavier Siméon	Reale Avintia Racing	Ducati	24	+39.583	22	
17	81	(Spain) Jordi Torres	Reale Avintia Racing	Ducati	24	+39.839	25	
18	4	(Italy) Andrea Dovizioso	Ducati Team	Ducati	24	+42.698	1	
19	45	(United Kingdom) Scott Redding	Aprilia Racing Team Gresini	Aprilia	24	+49.943	21	
20	12	(Switzerland) Thomas Lüthi	EG 0,0 Marc VDS	Honda	24	+52.707	23	
21	50	(France) Sylvain Guintoli	Team Suzuki Ecstar	Suzuki	24	+1:01.848	24	
Ret	29	(Italy) Andrea Iannone	Team Suzuki Ecstar	Suzuki	14	Accident	5	
Ret	17	(Czech Republic) Karel Abraham	Ángel Nieto Team	Ducati	12	Accident Damage	18	
Ret	43	(Australia) Jack Miller	Alma Pramac Racing	Ducati	10	Accident	3	
Ret	41	(Spain) Aleix Espargaró	Aprilia Racing Team Gresini	Aprilia	6	Tyre Pressure	19	
DNS	99	(Spain) Jorge Lorenzo	Ducati Team	Ducati		Did not start		
Sources:

- Jorge Lorenzo withdrew from the event due to left wrist injury suffered at the Thailand GP.

=== Moto2 ===
Pos.	No.	Rider	Manufacturer	Laps	Time/Retired	Grid	Points
1	42	(Italy) Francesco Bagnaia	Kalex	22	41:04.294	1	25
2	7	(Italy) Lorenzo Baldassarri	Kalex	22	+6.227	5	20
3	44	(Portugal) Miguel Oliveira	KTM	22	+11.553	9	16
4	73	(Spain) Álex Márquez	Kalex	22	+12.083	6	13
5	41	(South Africa) Brad Binder	KTM	22	+12.348	10	11
6	40	(Spain) Augusto Fernández	Kalex	22	+12.701	12	10
7	97	(Spain) Xavi Vierge	Kalex	22	+13.652	7	9
8	27	(Spain) Iker Lecuona	KTM	22	+13.811	3	8
9	10	(Italy) Luca Marini	Kalex	22	+15.604	11	7
10	23	(Germany) Marcel Schrötter	Kalex	22	+17.556	4	6
11	36	(Spain) Joan Mir	Kalex	22	+19.221	14	5
12	45	(Japan) Tetsuta Nagashima	Kalex	22	+19.811	8	4
13	77	(Switzerland) Dominique Aegerter	KTM	22	+20.278	17	3
14	54	(Italy) Mattia Pasini	Kalex	22	+23.091	21	2
15	87	(Australia) Remy Gardner	Tech 3	22	+24.468	13	1
16	5	(Italy) Andrea Locatelli	Kalex	22	+24.622	20	
17	22	(United Kingdom) Sam Lowes	KTM	22	+26.288	19	
18	16	(United States) Joe Roberts	NTS	22	+33.887	18	
19	4	(South Africa) Steven Odendaal	NTS	22	+34.074	25	
20	2	(Switzerland) Jesko Raffin	Kalex	22	+34.303	24	
21	66	(Finland) Niki Tuuli	Kalex	22	+37.458	28	
22	89	(Malaysia) Khairul Idham Pawi	Kalex	22	+37.921	23	
23	57	(Spain) Edgar Pons	Speed Up	22	+42.570	22	
24	62	(Italy) Stefano Manzi	Suter	22	+46.667	27	
25	95	(France) Jules Danilo	Kalex	22	+56.500	30	
26	32	(Spain) Isaac Viñales	Suter	22	+59.659	29	
27	18	(Andorra) Xavi Cardelús	Kalex	22	+1:07.065	31	
Ret	64	(Netherlands) Bo Bendsneyder	Tech 3	21	Engine	26	
Ret	9	(Spain) Jorge Navarro	Kalex	13	Accident	15	
Ret	21	(Italy) Federico Fuligni	Kalex	9	Accident Damage	32	
Ret	24	(Italy) Simone Corsi	Kalex	3	Accident	16	
DSQ	20	(France) Fabio Quartararo	Speed Up	22	(41:03.849) (Note: Disqualified due to a technical infringement.)	2	
OFFICIAL MOTO2 REPORT

=== Moto3 ===
Pos.	No.	Rider	Manufacturer	Laps	Time/Retired	Grid	Points
1	12	(Italy) Marco Bezzecchi	KTM	20	39:35.653	3	25
2	48	(Italy) Lorenzo Dalla Porta	Honda	20	+0.041	10	20
3	40	(South Africa) Darryn Binder	KTM	20	+0.042	5	16
4	10	(Italy) Dennis Foggia	KTM	20	+0.212	7	13
5	17	(United Kingdom) John McPhee	KTM	20	+0.251	2	11
6	14	(Italy) Tony Arbolino	Honda	20	+0.350	12	10
7	33	(Italy) Enea Bastianini	Honda	20	+0.404	6	9
8	19	(Argentina) Gabriel Rodrigo	KTM	20	+1.561	1	8
9	71	(Japan) Ayumu Sasaki	Honda	20	+3.137	13	7
10	84	(Czech Republic) Jakub Kornfeil	KTM	20	+7.965	16	6
11	5	(Spain) Jaume Masiá	KTM	20	+8.364	21	5
12	42	(Spain) Marcos Ramírez	KTM	20	+8.435	11	4
13	16	(Italy) Andrea Migno	KTM	20	+8.561	18	3
14	31	(Italy) Celestino Vietti	KTM	20	+9.041	24	2
15	24	(Japan) Tatsuki Suzuki	Honda	20	+9.237	26	1
16	65	(Germany) Philipp Öttl	KTM	20	+9.898	22	
17	27	(Japan) Kaito Toba	Honda	20	+10.897	28	
18	72	(Spain) Alonso López	Honda	20	+15.691	20	
19	7	(Malaysia) Adam Norrodin	Honda	20	+15.704	23	
20	81	(Italy) Stefano Nepa	KTM	20	+24.185	25	
21	41	(Thailand) Nakarin Atiratphuvapat	Honda	20	+24.581	27	
22	22	(Japan) Kazuki Masaki	KTM	20	+41.928	8	
23	13	(Japan) Shizuka Okazaki	Honda	20	+1:48.336	29	
24	36	(Japan) Yuto Fukushima	Honda	19	+1 lap	30	
Ret	88	(Spain) Jorge Martín	Honda	14	Accident	4	
Ret	75	(Spain) Albert Arenas	KTM	10	Accident Damage	9	
Ret	21	(Italy) Fabio Di Giannantonio	Honda	5	Accident	15	
Ret	23	(Italy) Niccolò Antonelli	Honda	1	Accident	17	
Ret	77	(Spain) Vicente Pérez	KTM	1	Accident	14	
Ret	44	(Spain) Arón Canet	Honda	0	Accident	19	
OFFICIAL MOTO3 REPORT

== Championship standings after the race ==
- **Bold text** indicates the World Champions.

=== MotoGP ===
Pos.	Rider	Points
1	(Spain) **Marc Márquez**	296
2	(Italy) Andrea Dovizioso	194
3	(Italy) Valentino Rossi	185
4	(Spain) Maverick Viñales	155
5	(United Kingdom) Cal Crutchlow	148
6	(France) Johann Zarco	133
7	(Italy) Danilo Petrucci	133
8	(Spain) Jorge Lorenzo	130
9	(Spain) Álex Rins	118
10	(Italy) Andrea Iannone	113

=== Moto2 ===
Pos.	Rider	Points
1	(Italy) Francesco Bagnaia	284
2	(Portugal) Miguel Oliveira	247
3	(South Africa) Brad Binder	168
4	(Italy) Lorenzo Baldassarri	152
5	(Spain) Álex Márquez	139
6	(Spain) Joan Mir	129
7	(Germany) Marcel Schrötter	124
8	(Italy) Mattia Pasini	115
9	(France) Fabio Quartararo	111
10	(Italy) Luca Marini	111

=== Moto3 ===
Pos.	Rider	Points
1	(Spain) Jorge Martín	204
2	(Italy) Marco Bezzecchi	203
3	(Italy) Fabio Di Giannantonio	175
4	(Italy) Enea Bastianini	142
5	(Italy) Lorenzo Dalla Porta	131
6	(Spain) Arón Canet	118
7	(Argentina) Gabriel Rodrigo	116
8	(Czech Republic) Jakub Kornfeil	108
9	(Spain) Marcos Ramírez	90
10	(Italy) Andrea Migno	79

== Notes ==
Previous race: 2018 Thailand Grand Prix	FIM Grand Prix World Championship; 2018 season	Next race: 2018 Australian Grand Prix
Previous race: 2017 Japanese Grand Prix	Japanese motorcycle Grand Prix	Next race: 2019 Japanese Grand Prix
