= Suzuka 8 Hours =

Motorcycle race

FIM Endurance World Championship
- Venue: Suzuka Circuit
- Corporate sponsor: Coca-Cola
- First race: 1978
- Duration: 8 hours

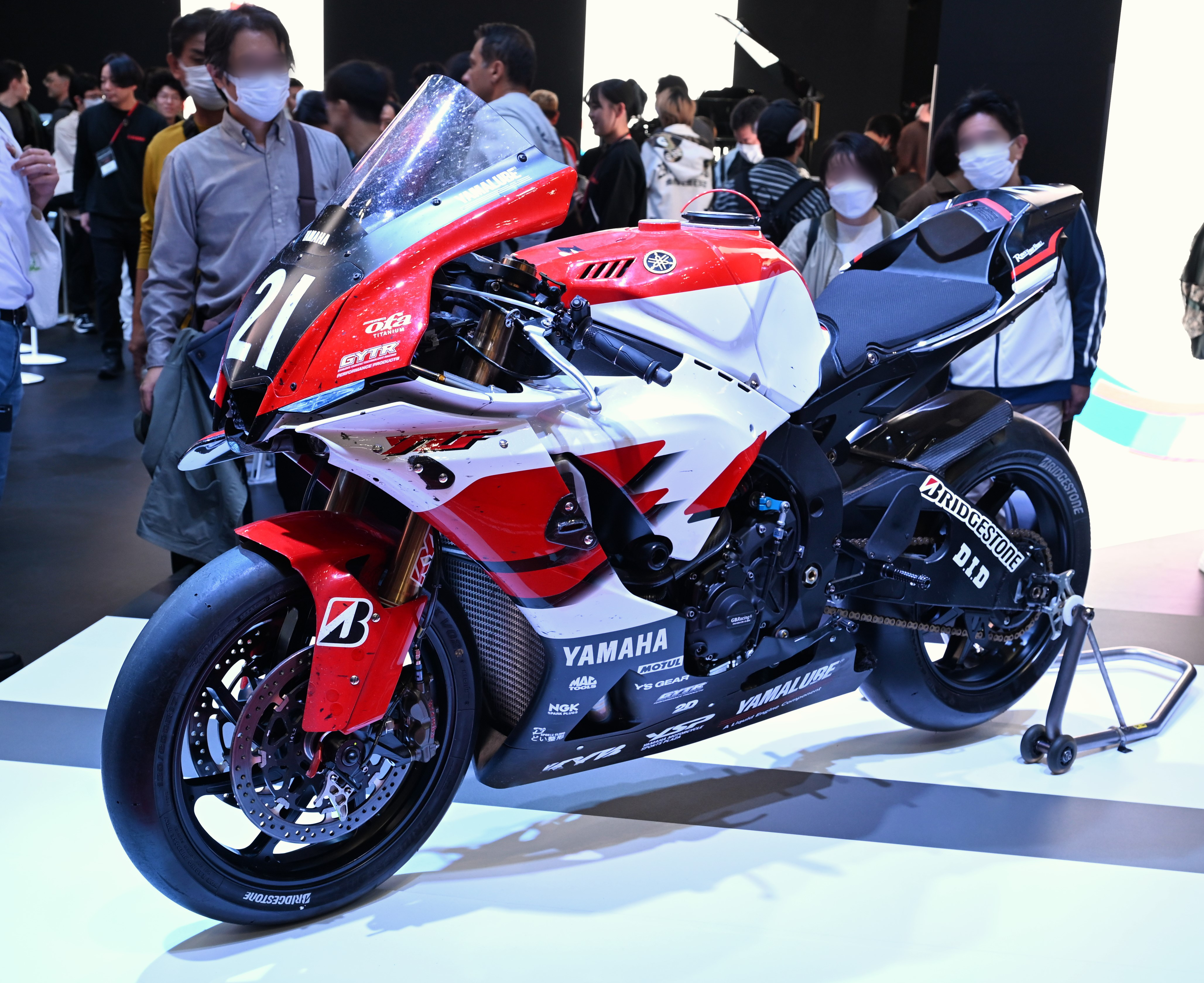
Yamaha YZF-R1 (2025 special livery)

The Suzuka 8 hours (Japanese: 鈴鹿8時間耐久ロードレース, Hepburn: Suzuka hachi-jikan taikyū rōdo rēsu; Suzuka 8 hours Endurance Road Race) is a motorcycle endurance race held at the Suzuka Circuit in Japan each year. The race runs for eight hours consecutively, and entrants are composed of two or more riders who alternate during pitstops.

== History ==
The race began in 1978 as a race for prototype Tourist Trophy Formula One (TT-F1) motorcycles which meant the big four Japanese companies (Honda, Kawasaki, Suzuki and Yamaha), who had unlimited engineering resources, could use them on the track. In 1980, the race became part of the FIM Endurance World Championship. With the exception of 2005, due to the high importance the big four Japanese manufacturers place on the race, the governing bodies set a race date that avoids conflict with any of the other major championship races.

Throughout the years, the race had gone through several rule changes in accordance to the FIM, including the restriction to 750cc for F1 bikes. In 1993, the Superbikes class, which had been a support class in previous 8 Hours races, became the main class due to the high popularity. The Formula One class, which at the time was the pinnacle of the race, would be removed altogether. Another category included in the race is the Naked class (for motorcycles without fairings - similar to the streetfighter bikes).

At the event's peak during the 1980s, the race attracted in excess of 130,000 spectators while presently it attracts a crowd around 85,000. The record attendance figure is 160,000 in 1990.

== Star riders ==
A main attraction of the Suzuka 8 Hours race is that it usually features international star riders from MotoGP and SBK alike. It is not uncommon for participating riders to have the 8 Hours race written into their contracts upon acquiring a factory ride in MotoGP or Superbike. Also based on their performance history in their respective class during the season, the riders will usually negotiate to have the requirement of racing future 8 Hours races removed from their contract. Most high-level riders often skip the Suzuka 8 Hours because it breaks up their mid-season momentum and is physically draining. Michael Doohan is an example of one such rider who raced the 8 Hours early in his career but had his contractual obligations to the race there removed following his significant success in the 500cc Grand Prix motorcycle class, later known as MotoGP.

On the other hand, high-level Japanese riders return for the Suzuka 8 Hours annually as it is regarded by the Japanese as one of the biggest motorsport events on the calendar in Japan. As the Suzuka 8 Hours is part of the FIM World Endurance Racing Championship, its priority on the international calendar, along with the off-weeks in the FIM calendar, makes this race one of the most crucial on the schedule.

From 2003 to 2013, during which MotoGP had a Laguna Seca round, race winners had almost been exclusively Japanese, with only an occasional international-level star in the race, primarily since the Laguna Seca round either conflicted with the 8 Hours or was days after the event. From 2002-2014, only World Superbike stars participated in the event, and four European riders have won, with the 2013 three-rider team consisting mostly of European riders.

With the US Grand Prix at Laguna Seca discontinued as of 2014, MotoGP stars have once again participated in the race, with Yamaha emerging as the 2015 winners with SBK rider Bradley Smith and MotoGP riders Katsuyuki Nakasuga and Pol Espargaró, the latter of whom was the 2013 Moto2 champion. Double MotoGP champion Casey Stoner also came out of retirement that year to race for Honda, alongside Michael van der Mark and Takumi Takahashi. His team was leading the race until Stoner crashed out when his throttle stuck open, resulting in a fractured tibia and shoulder for the Australian. Espargaró and Nakasuga (now a Yamaha test rider in addition to domestic racing in Japan) repeated the feat in 2016 with Alex Lowes as their third rider. Nakasuga won the race third time in a row in 2017 with Alex Lowes and Michael van der Mark, making him the second rider to win three consecutive 8 Hours races, repeating the feat previously achieved by Aaron Slight in the 1990s.

== Winners ==
Year	No.	Team	Riders	Manufacturer	Motorcycle	Laps	Time
2026	30	(Japan) Honda HRC	(Japan) Takumi Takahashi (United Kingdom) Jonathan Rea (Thailand) Somkiat Chantra	Honda	CBR1000RR-R SP	188	7:54'19.425
2025	30	(Japan) Honda Team HRC	(Japan) Takumi Takahashi (France) Johann Zarco	Honda	CBR1000RR-R SP	217	8:00'26.580
2024	30	(Japan) Honda Team HRC	(Japan) Takumi Takahashi (France) Johann Zarco (Japan) Teppei Nagoe	Honda	CBR1000RR-R SP	220	8:01'29.693
2023	33	(Japan) Honda Team HRC	(Japan) Tetsuta Nagashima (Japan) Takumi Takahashi (Spain) Xavi Vierge	Honda	CBR1000RR-R SP	214	8:00'09.785
2022	33	(Japan) Honda Team HRC	(Japan) Tetsuta Nagashima (Japan) Takumi Takahashi (Spain) Iker Lecuona	Honda	CBR1000RR-R SP	214	8:02'09.131
2019	10	(Japan) Kawasaki Racing Team Suzuka 8H	(United Kingdom) Jonathan Rea (United Kingdom) Leon Haslam (Turkey) Toprak Razgatlıoğlu	Kawasaki	Ninja ZX-10RR	216	7:55'36.613
2018	21	(Japan) Yamaha Factory Racing Team	(Japan) Katsuyuki Nakasuga (United Kingdom) Alex Lowes (Netherlands) Michael van der Mark	Yamaha	YZF-R1	199	8:00'01.728
2017	21	(Japan) Yamaha Factory Racing Team	(Japan) Katsuyuki Nakasuga (United Kingdom) Alex Lowes (Netherlands) Michael van der Mark	Yamaha	YZF-R1	216	8:00'32.959
2016	21	(Japan) Yamaha Factory Racing Team	(Japan) Katsuyuki Nakasuga (United Kingdom) Alex Lowes (Spain) Pol Espargaró	Yamaha	YZF-R1	218	8:00'40.124
2015	21	(Japan) Yamaha Factory Racing Team	(Japan) Katsuyuki Nakasuga (United Kingdom) Bradley Smith (Spain) Pol Espargaró	Yamaha	YZF-R1	204	8:00'29.708
2014	634	(Japan) MuSASHi RT HARC-PRO.	(Japan) Takumi Takahashi (Netherlands) Michael van der Mark (United Kingdom) Leon Haslam	Honda	CBR1000RRW	172	6:56'13.056
2013	634	(Japan) MuSASHi RT HARC-PRO.	(Japan) Takumi Takahashi (Netherlands) Michael van der Mark (United Kingdom) Leon Haslam	Honda	CBR1000RRW	214	8:00'01.280
2012	11	(Japan) F.C.C.-TSR Honda	(Japan) Kousuke Akiyoshi (Japan) Tadayuki Okada (United Kingdom) Jonathan Rea	Honda	CBR1000RRW	215	8:01'35.450
2011	11	(Japan) F.C.C.-TSR Honda	(Japan) Kousuke Akiyoshi (Japan) Ryuichi Kiyonari (Japan) Shinichi Itoh	Honda	CBR1000RRW	217	8:00'50.922
2010	634	(Japan) MuSASHi RT HARC-PRO.	(Japan) Takumi Takahashi (Japan) Ryuichi Kiyonari (Japan) Takaaki Nakagami	Honda	CBR1000RRW	215	8:01'13.428
2009	12	(Japan) Yoshimura Suzuki with JOMO	(Japan) Daisaku Sakai (Japan) Kazuki Tokudome (Japan) Nobuatsu Aoki	Suzuki	S-GSX-R1000	183	8:01'59"916
2008	11	(Japan) Dream Honda Racing	(Japan) Ryuichi Kiyonari (Spain) Carlos Checa	Honda	CBR1000RRW	214	8:00'20"726
2007	34	(Japan) Yoshimura Suzuki with JOMO	(Japan) Yukio Kagayama (Japan) Kousuke Akiyoshi	Suzuki	S-GSX-R1000	216	8:01'35"077
2006	778	(Japan) F.C.C.-TSR ZIP-FM Racing	(Japan) Takeshi Tsujimura (Japan) Shinichi Itoh	Honda	CBR1000RRW	214	8:02'07"624
2005	7	(Japan) Seven Stars Racing	(Japan) Tohru Ukawa (Japan) Ryuichi Kiyonari	Honda	CBR1000RRW	204	8:01'22"351
2004	7	(Japan) Seven Stars Racing	(Japan) Tohru Ukawa (Japan) Hitoyasu Izutsu	Honda	CBR1000RRW	210	8:01'35"115
2003	71	(Japan) Team Sakurai Honda	(Japan) Yukio Nukumi (Japan) Manabu Kamada	Honda	VTR1000SPW	212	8:00'38"909
2002	11	(Japan) Team Cabin Honda	(Japan) Daijiro Kato (United States) Colin Edwards	Honda	VTR1000SPW	219	8:02'04"992
2001	11	(Japan) Team Cabin Honda	(Italy) Valentino Rossi (United States) Colin Edwards (Japan) Manabu Kamada	Honda	VTR1000SPW	217	8:01'30"173
2000	4	(Japan) Team Cabin Honda	(Japan) Tohru Ukawa (Japan) Daijiro Kato	Honda	VTR1000SPW	215	8:00'31"775
1999	4	(Japan) Lucky Strike Honda	(Japan) Tadayuki Okada (Brazil) Alex Barros	Honda	RC45	213	8:01'59"918
1998	33	(Japan) Lucky Strike Honda & Iwaki	(Japan) Shinichi Itoh (Japan) Tohru Ukawa	Honda	RC45	212	8:01'54"740
1997	33	(Japan) Hori-Pro Honda with HARC	(Japan) Shinichi Itoh (Japan) Tohru Ukawa	Honda	RC45	186	8:02'03"722
1996	45	(Japan) Yamaha Racing Team	(United States) Colin Edwards (Japan) Noriyuki Haga	Yamaha	YZF750	214	8:02'06"411
1995	11	(Japan) Team HRC	(New Zealand) Aaron Slight (Japan) Tadayuki Okada	Honda	RC45	212	8:00'00"468
1994	11	(Japan) Team HRC	(United States) Doug Polen (New Zealand) Aaron Slight	Honda	RC45	183	6:52'49"056
1993	1	(Japan) Itoham Racing Kawasaki	(United States) Scott Russell (New Zealand) Aaron Slight	Kawasaki	Ninja ZXR-7	207	8:01'13"713
1992	11	(Japan) Oki Honda Racing Team	(Australia) Wayne Gardner (Australia) Daryl Beattie	Honda	RVF750	208	8:00'07"117
1991	11	(Japan) Oki Honda Racing Team	(Australia) Wayne Gardner (Australia) Mick Doohan	Honda	RVF750	192	7:59'25"924
1990	21	(Japan) Shiseido Tech 21 Racing Team	(Japan) Tadahiko Taira (United States) Eddie Lawson	Yamaha	YZF750	205	7:57'35"859
1989	2	(Japan) Beams Honda with Ikuzawa	(France) Dominique Sarron (France) Alex Vieira	Honda	RVF750	202	7:58'34"328
1988	3	(United States) Team Lucky Strike Roberts	(Australia) Kevin Magee (United States) Wayne Rainey	Yamaha	YZF750	202	8:02'21"384
1987	21	(Japan) Shiseido Tech 21 Racing Team	(Germany) Martin Wimmer (Australia) Kevin Magee	Yamaha	YZF750	200	8:01'30"045
1986	4	(Japan) Team HRC	(Australia) Wayne Gardner (France) Dominique Sarron	Honda	RVF750	197	8:01'30"738
1985	3	(Japan) Team HRC	(Australia) Wayne Gardner (Japan) Masaki Tokuno	Honda	RVF750	195	8:01'40"102
1984	1	(United States) Honda America	(United States) Mike Baldwin (United States) Fred Merkel	Honda	RS750R	191	8:01'30"35
1983	6	HB Suzuki France	(France) Hervé Moineau (Belgium) Richard Hubin	Suzuki	GS1000R	190	8:02'29"32
1982	27	(Japan) Blue Helmet MSC	(Japan) Shigeo Iijima (Japan) Shinji Hagiwara	Honda	CB900F	120	6:02'55"83
1981	1	Honda France	(United States) Mike Baldwin (United States) David Aldana	Honda	RS1000	199	8:00'47"12
1980	12	(Japan) Yoshimura R&D	(United States) Wes Cooley (New Zealand) Graeme Crosby	Suzuki	GS1000	200	8:01'03"54
1979	6	Honda Australia	(Australia) Tony Hatton (Australia) Michael Cole	Honda	CB900	197	8:00'23"78
1978	2	(Japan) Yoshimura Racing	(United States) Wes Cooley (United States) Mike Baldwin	Suzuki	GS1000	194	8:02'51"53

=== By manufacturer ===
Wins	Manufacturer	Years
32	(Japan) Honda	1979, 1981, 1982, 1984, 1985, 1986, 1989, 1991, 1992, 1994, 1995, 1997, 1998, 1999, 2000, 2001, 2002, 2003, 2004, 2005, 2006, 2008, 2010, 2011, 2012, 2013, 2014, 2022, 2023, 2024, 2025, 2026
8	(Japan) Yamaha	1987, 1988, 1990, 1996, 2015, 2016, 2017, 2018
5	(Japan) Suzuki	1978, 1980, 1983, 2007, 2009
2	(Japan) Kawasaki	1993, 2019
