= 2016 Japanese motorcycle Grand Prix =

(Japan) 2016 Japanese Grand Prix
Race details
- Race 15 of 18 races in the 2016 Grand Prix motorcycle racing season
- Date: 16 October 2016
- Official name: Motul Grand Prix of Japan
- Location: Twin Ring Motegi
- Course: Permanent racing facility; 4.801 km (2.983 mi)

MotoGP
Pole position
| Rider | (Italy) Valentino Rossi | Yamaha |
| Time | 1:43.954 | |
Fastest lap
| Rider | (Spain) Marc Márquez | Honda |
| Time | 1:45.576 on lap 6 | |
Podium
| First | (Spain) Marc Márquez | Honda |
| Second | (Italy) Andrea Dovizioso | Ducati |
| Third | (Spain) Maverick Viñales | Suzuki |

Moto2
Pole position
| Rider | (France) Johann Zarco | Kalex |
| Time | 1:49.961 | |
Fastest lap
| Rider | (Italy) Franco Morbidelli | Kalex |
| Time | 1:50.788 on lap 3 | |
Podium
| First | (Switzerland) Thomas Lüthi | Kalex |
| Second | (France) Johann Zarco | Kalex |
| Third | (Italy) Franco Morbidelli | Kalex |

Moto3
Pole position
| Rider | (Japan) Hiroki Ono (Note: Hiroki Ono, who set the fastest time in qualifying, received a grid penalty which promoted Andrea Migno to the pole position grid slot.) | Honda |
| Time | 1:56.443 | |
Fastest lap
| Rider | (Italy) Nicolò Bulega | KTM |
| Time | 1:57.218 on lap 5 | |
Podium
| First | (Italy) Enea Bastianini | Honda |
| Second | (South Africa) Brad Binder | KTM |
| Third | (Italy) Nicolò Bulega | KTM |

The 2016 Japanese motorcycle Grand Prix was the fifteenth round of the 2016 MotoGP season. It was held at the Twin Ring Motegi in Motegi on 16 October 2016.

== MotoGP race report ==
In the MotoGP class, both factory Yamaha riders crashed out of the race, thus marking their first double retirement since the 2011 British Grand Prix.

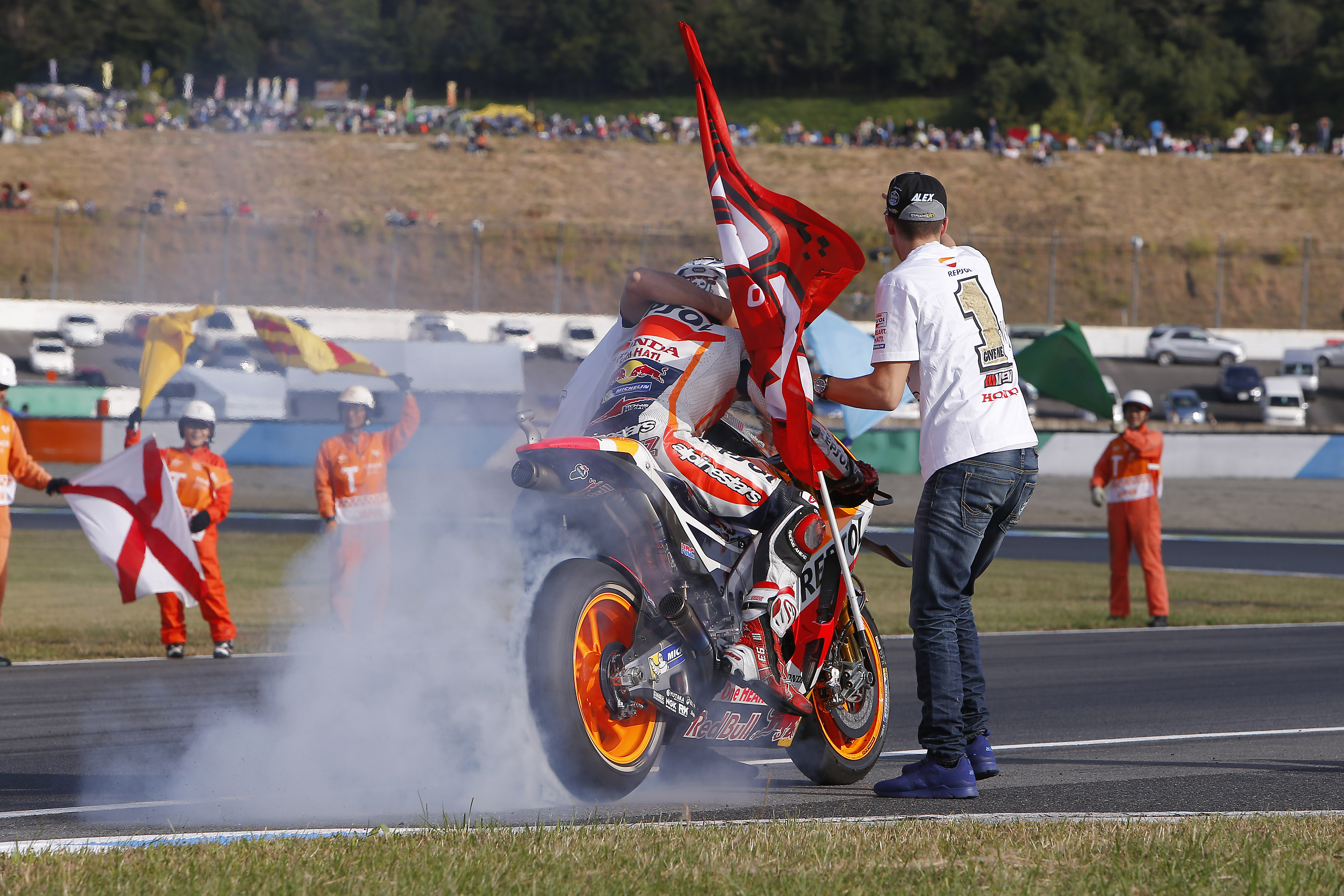
Marc Márquez, doing a burnout and celebrating his third MotoGP world championship title after winning the race.

== Classification ==
=== MotoGP ===
With Andrea Iannone still recovering from the injuries sustained at Misano, he was replaced in the factory Ducati team by Héctor Barberá. Australian Superbike rider Mike Jones made his MotoGP debut filling in for Barbera at Avintia Racing.

Dani Pedrosa suffered a broken collarbone in a crash during Friday practice and was replaced by Honda test rider Hiroshi Aoyama for the rest of the weekend.

| Pos. | No. | Rider | Team | Manufacturer | Laps | Time/Retired | Grid | Points |
|---|---|---|---|---|---|---|---|---|
| 1 | 93 | (Spain) Marc Márquez | Repsol Honda Team | Honda | 24 | 42:34.610 | 2 | 25 |
| 2 | 04 | (Italy) Andrea Dovizioso | Ducati Team | Ducati | 24 | +2.992 | 4 | 20 |
| 3 | 25 | (Spain) Maverick Viñales | Team Suzuki Ecstar | Suzuki | 24 | +4.104 | 7 | 16 |
| 4 | 41 | (Spain) Aleix Espargaró | Team Suzuki Ecstar | Suzuki | 24 | +4.726 | 6 | 13 |
| 5 | 35 | (United Kingdom) Cal Crutchlow | LCR Honda | Honda | 24 | +15.049 | 5 | 11 |
| 6 | 44 | (Spain) Pol Espargaró | Monster Yamaha Tech 3 | Yamaha | 24 | +19.654 | 9 | 10 |
| 7 | 19 | (Spain) Álvaro Bautista | Aprilia Racing Team Gresini | Aprilia | 24 | +23.032 | 12 | 9 |
| 8 | 9 | (Italy) Danilo Petrucci | Octo Pramac Yakhnich | Ducati | 24 | +28.555 | 10 | 8 |
| 9 | 45 | (United Kingdom) Scott Redding | Octo Pramac Yakhnich | Ducati | 24 | +28.802 | 11 | 7 |
| 10 | 6 | (Germany) Stefan Bradl | Aprilia Racing Team Gresini | Aprilia | 24 | +32.330 | 13 | 6 |
| 11 | 21 | (Japan) Katsuyuki Nakasuga | Yamalube Yamaha Factory Racing | Yamaha | 24 | +42.845 | 16 | 5 |
| 12 | 68 | (Colombia) Yonny Hernández | Pull & Bear Aspar Team | Ducati | 24 | +52.219 | 17 | 4 |
| 13 | 38 | (United Kingdom) Bradley Smith | Monster Yamaha Tech 3 | Yamaha | 24 | +53.783 | 15 | 3 |
| 14 | 53 | (Spain) Tito Rabat | Estrella Galicia 0,0 Marc VDS | Honda | 24 | +54.760 | 18 | 2 |
| 15 | 73 | (Japan) Hiroshi Aoyama | Repsol Honda Team | Honda | 24 | +1:00.155 | 22 | 1 |
| 16 | 76 | (France) Loris Baz | Avintia Racing | Ducati | 24 | +1:04.440 | 20 | |
| 17 | 8 | (Spain) Héctor Barberá | Ducati Team | Ducati | 24 | +1:42.966 | 8 | |
| 18 | 7 | (Australia) Mike Jones | Avintia Racing | Ducati | 23 | +1 lap | 21 | |
| Ret | 99 | (Spain) Jorge Lorenzo | Movistar Yamaha MotoGP | Yamaha | 19 | Accident | 3 | |
| Ret | 46 | (Italy) Valentino Rossi | Movistar Yamaha MotoGP | Yamaha | 6 | Accident | 1 | |
| Ret | 43 | (Australia) Jack Miller | Estrella Galicia 0,0 Marc VDS | Honda | 6 | Accident | 14 | |
| Ret | 50 | (Republic of Ireland) Eugene Laverty | Pull & Bear Aspar Team | Ducati | 2 | Accident | 19 | |
| WD | 26 | (Spain) Dani Pedrosa | Repsol Honda Team | Honda | | Withdrew | | |

=== Moto2 ===
| Pos. | No. | Rider | Manufacturer | Laps | Time/Retired | Grid | Points |
|---|---|---|---|---|---|---|---|
| 1 | 12 | (Switzerland) Thomas Lüthi | Kalex | 23 | 42:45.854 | 2 | 25 |
| 2 | 5 | (France) Johann Zarco | Kalex | 23 | +0.386 | 1 | 20 |
| 3 | 21 | (Italy) Franco Morbidelli | Kalex | 23 | +5.863 | 3 | 16 |
| 4 | 30 | (Japan) Takaaki Nakagami | Kalex | 23 | +6.090 | 7 | 13 |
| 5 | 11 | (Germany) Sandro Cortese | Kalex | 23 | +16.246 | 5 | 11 |
| 6 | 24 | (Italy) Simone Corsi | Speed Up | 23 | +20.404 | 13 | 10 |
| 7 | 54 | (Italy) Mattia Pasini | Kalex | 23 | +20.683 | 10 | 9 |
| 8 | 60 | (Spain) Julián Simón | Speed Up | 23 | +20.760 | 16 | 8 |
| 9 | 23 | (Germany) Marcel Schrötter | Kalex | 23 | +24.394 | 11 | 7 |
| 10 | 19 | (Belgium) Xavier Siméon | Speed Up | 23 | +27.113 | 17 | 6 |
| 11 | 97 | (Spain) Xavi Vierge | Tech 3 | 23 | +30.158 | 18 | 5 |
| 12 | 10 | (Italy) Luca Marini | Kalex | 23 | +32.283 | 26 | 4 |
| 13 | 55 | (Malaysia) Hafizh Syahrin | Kalex | 23 | +32.391 | 12 | 3 |
| 14 | 45 | (Japan) Tetsuta Nagashima | Kalex | 23 | +35.348 | 24 | 2 |
| 15 | 32 | (Spain) Isaac Viñales | Tech 3 | 23 | +35.486 | 20 | 1 |
| 16 | 57 | (Spain) Edgar Pons | Kalex | 23 | +39.558 | 21 | |
| 17 | 2 | (Switzerland) Jesko Raffin | Kalex | 23 | +39.690 | 19 | |
| 18 | 14 | (Thailand) Ratthapark Wilairot | Kalex | 23 | +45.258 | 25 | |
| 19 | 87 | (Australia) Remy Gardner | Kalex | 23 | +47.910 | 23 | |
| 20 | 40 | (Spain) Álex Rins | Kalex | 23 | +1:04.723 | 22 | |
| 21 | 63 | (Japan) Naomichi Uramoto | Kalex | 23 | +1:05.916 | 29 | |
| 22 | 84 | (Japan) Taro Sekiguchi | TSR | 23 | +1:26.636 | 30 | |
| Ret | 27 | (Spain) Iker Lecuona | Kalex | 14 | Accident Damage | 28 | |
| Ret | 49 | (Spain) Axel Pons | Kalex | 13 | Accident Damage | 6 | |
| Ret | 7 | (Italy) Lorenzo Baldassarri | Kalex | 10 | Accident Damage | 14 | |
| Ret | 73 | (Spain) Álex Márquez | Kalex | 7 | Accident | 8 | |
| Ret | 52 | (United Kingdom) Danny Kent | Kalex | 7 | Gear Shifter | 15 | |
| Ret | 94 | (Germany) Jonas Folger | Kalex | 4 | Accident | 9 | |
| Ret | 22 | (United Kingdom) Sam Lowes | Kalex | 1 | Accident | 4 | |
| Ret | 70 | (Switzerland) Robin Mulhauser | Kalex | 1 | Accident | 27 | |
| DNS | 44 | (Portugal) Miguel Oliveira | Kalex | | Did not start | | |
OFFICIAL MOTO2 REPORT

- Miguel Oliveira withdrew after the first practice session due to effects of the broken collarbone suffered at Aragon GP.

=== Moto3 ===
| Pos. | No. | Rider | Manufacturer | Laps | Time/Retired | Grid | Points |
|---|---|---|---|---|---|---|---|
| 1 | 33 | (Italy) Enea Bastianini | Honda | 20 | 39:24.273 | 3 | 25 |
| 2 | 41 | (South Africa) Brad Binder | KTM | 20 | +0.017 | 2 | 20 |
| 3 | 8 | (Italy) Nicolò Bulega | KTM | 20 | +4.002 | 5 | 16 |
| 4 | 65 | (Germany) Philipp Öttl | KTM | 20 | +5.119 | 10 | 13 |
| 5 | 4 | (Italy) Fabio Di Giannantonio | Honda | 20 | +6.288 | 18 | 11 |
| 6 | 21 | (Italy) Francesco Bagnaia | Mahindra | 20 | +7.739 | 12 | 10 |
| 7 | 11 | (Belgium) Livio Loi | Honda | 20 | +7.749 | 15 | 9 |
| 8 | 20 | (France) Fabio Quartararo | KTM | 20 | +8.344 | 8 | 8 |
| 9 | 36 | (Spain) Joan Mir | KTM | 20 | +8.880 | 14 | 7 |
| 10 | 23 | (Italy) Niccolò Antonelli | Honda | 20 | +9.037 | 7 | 6 |
| 11 | 48 | (Italy) Lorenzo Dalla Porta | KTM | 20 | +12.332 | 6 | 5 |
| 12 | 7 | (Malaysia) Adam Norrodin | Honda | 20 | +13.525 | 9 | 4 |
| 13 | 84 | (Czech Republic) Jakub Kornfeil | Honda | 20 | +18.818 | 21 | 3 |
| 14 | 12 | (Spain) Albert Arenas | Peugeot | 20 | +21.263 | 13 | 2 |
| 15 | 24 | (Japan) Tatsuki Suzuki | Mahindra | 20 | +21.291 | 25 | 1 |
| 16 | 95 | (France) Jules Danilo | Honda | 20 | +21.727 | 24 | |
| 17 | 42 | (Spain) Marcos Ramírez | Mahindra | 20 | +34.475 | 26 | |
| 18 | 64 | (Netherlands) Bo Bendsneyder | KTM | 20 | +39.950 | 27 | |
| 19 | 89 | (Malaysia) Khairul Idham Pawi | Honda | 20 | +40.177 | 22 | |
| 20 | 3 | (Italy) Fabio Spiranelli | Mahindra | 20 | +46.804 | 32 | |
| 21 | 77 | (Italy) Lorenzo Petrarca | Mahindra | 20 | +49.085 | 31 | |
| 22 | 40 | (South Africa) Darryn Binder | Mahindra | 20 | +52.570 | 28 | |
| 23 | 6 | (Spain) María Herrera | KTM | 20 | +52.682 | 30 | |
| 24 | 16 | (Italy) Andrea Migno | KTM | 20 | +1:16.774 | 1 | |
| 25 | 58 | (Spain) Juan Francisco Guevara | KTM | 20 | +1:22.102 | 20 | |
| 26 | 13 | (Japan) Shizuka Okazaki | Honda | 20 | +1:51.623 | 34 | |
| Ret | 88 | (Spain) Jorge Martín | Mahindra | 10 | Rider In Pain | 23 | |
| Ret | 44 | (Spain) Arón Canet | Honda | 9 | Accident | 17 | |
| Ret | 55 | (Italy) Andrea Locatelli | KTM | 4 | Accident | 29 | |
| Ret | 43 | (Italy) Stefano Valtulini | Mahindra | 3 | Accident | 33 | |
| Ret | 9 | (Spain) Jorge Navarro | Honda | 0 | Accident | 11 | |
| Ret | 17 | (United Kingdom) John McPhee | Peugeot | 0 | Accident | 16 | |
| Ret | 19 | (Argentina) Gabriel Rodrigo | KTM | 0 | Accident | 19 | |
| DSQ | 76 | (Japan) Hiroki Ono | Honda | 20 | (+2.654) (Note: Disqualified due to a technical infringement.) | 4 | |
| DNS | 15 | (Japan) Rei Sato | Honda | | Did not start | | |
OFFICIAL MOTO3 REPORT

== Championship standings after the race (MotoGP) ==
Below are the standings for the top five riders and constructors after round fifteen has concluded.

Riders' Championship standings

| Pos. | Rider | Points |
|---|---|---|
| 1 | (Spain) Marc Marquez | 273 |
| 2 | (Italy) Valentino Rossi | 196 |
| 3 | (Spain) Jorge Lorenzo | 182 |
| 4 | (Spain) Maverick Vinales | 165 |
| 5 | (Spain) Dani Pedrosa | 155 |

Constructors' Championship standings

| Pos. | Constructor | Points |
|---|---|---|
| 1 | (Japan) Honda | 316 |
| 2 | (Japan) Yamaha | 288 |
| 3 | (Italy) Ducati | 207 |
| 4 | (Japan) Suzuki | 171 |
| 5 | (Italy) Aprilia | 81 |

- Note: Only the top five positions are included for both sets of standings.

== Notes ==
| Previous race: 2016 Aragon Grand Prix | FIM Grand Prix World Championship; 2016 season | Next race: 2016 Australian Grand Prix |
| Previous race: 2015 Japanese Grand Prix | Japanese motorcycle Grand Prix | Next race: 2017 Japanese Grand Prix |
