= Takumi Takahashi =

Japanese motorcycle racer (born 1989)

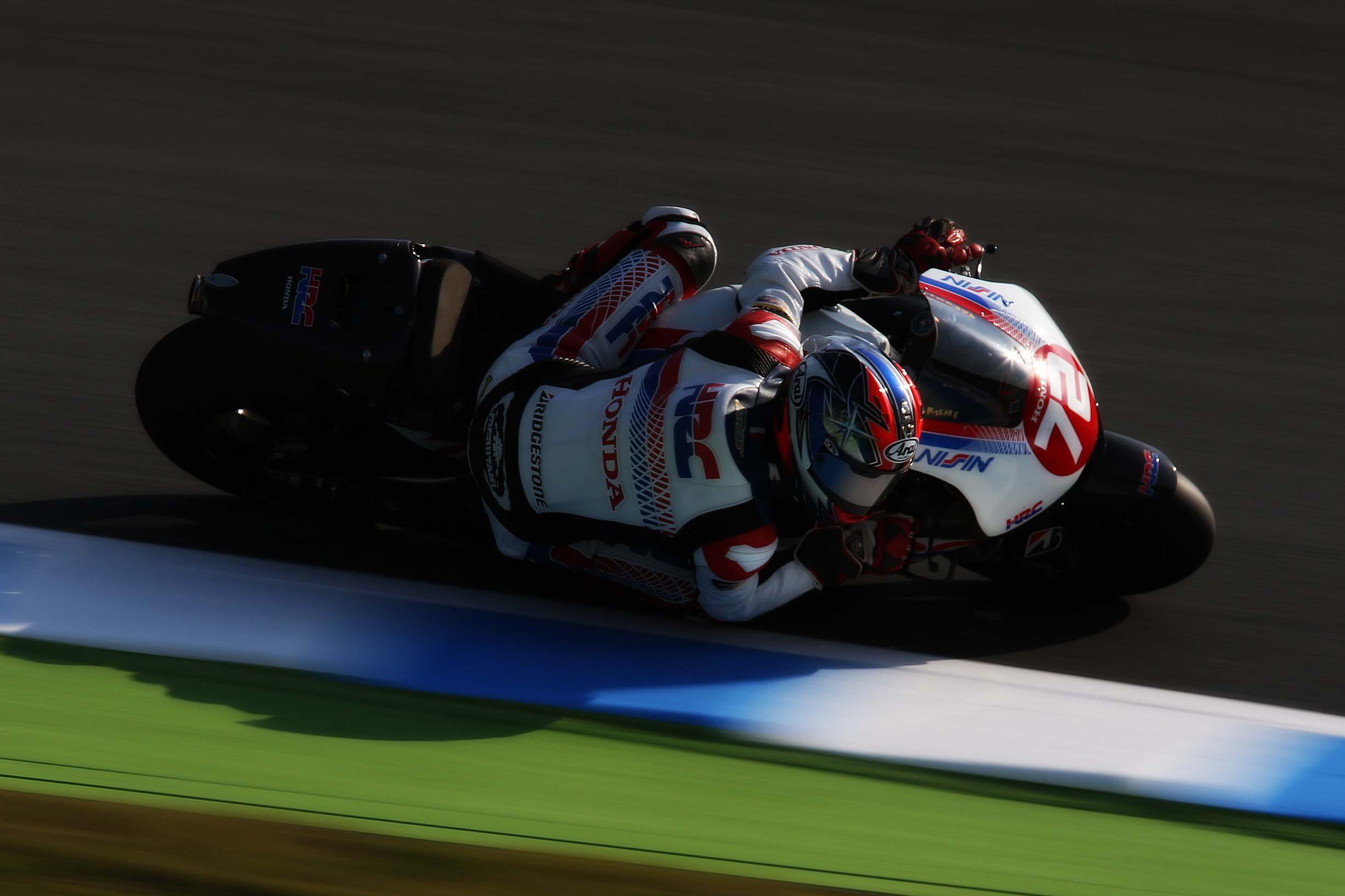
- Takahashi at the 2015 Japanese Grand Prix
- Nationality: Japanese
- Born: 26 November 1989 (age 36); Saitama, Japan
- Current team: Honda HRC Team
- Bike number: 30
Motorcycle racing career statistics
MotoGP World Championship
Active years	2015, 2023
Manufacturers	Honda
Championships	0
2023 championship position	NC (0 pts)
Starts / Wins / Podiums / Poles / F. laps / Points; 1 / 0 / 0 / 0 / 0 / 4
250cc World Championship
Active years	2006–2008
Manufacturers	Honda
Championships	0
2008 championship position	NC (0 pts)
Starts / Wins / Podiums / Poles / F. laps / Points; 3 / 0 / 0 / 0 / 0 / 0
125cc World Championship
Active years	2005
Manufacturers	Honda
Championships	0
2005 championship position	NC (0 pts)
Starts / Wins / Podiums / Poles / F. laps / Points; 1 / 0 / 0 / 0 / 0 / 0
Superbike World Championship
Active years	2017, 2019–2020
Manufacturers	Honda
Championships	0
2020 championship position	22nd (6 pts)
Starts / Wins / Podiums / Poles / F. laps / Points; 31 / 0 / 0 / 0 / 0 / 15

Takumi Takahashi (高橋 巧, Takahashi Takumi; born 26 November 1989) is a Japanese motorcycle racer for Honda HRC in the FIM Endurance World Championship. He recently competed in the British Superbike Championship on a factory-supported Honda Fireblade.

Takahashi has raced in the All Japan Road Race Championship in the GP125 class, in the GP250 class, where he was champion in 2008, and in the JSB1000 class, where he was champion in 2017. He won the Suzuka 8 Hours in 2010 with Ryuichi Kiyonari and Takaaki Nakagami, and again in 2013 and 2014 with Michael van der Mark and Leon Haslam. A test rider for Honda Racing Corporation, Takahashi made a wild card appearance in his home race in the 2015 MotoGP World Championship.

== Career statistics ==
=== Grand Prix motorcycle racing ===
==== By season ====
Season	Class	Motorcycle	Team	Race	Win	Podium	Pole	FLap	Pts	Plcd
2005	125cc	Honda RS125R	Arie Molenaar Racing	1	0	0	0	0	0	NC
2006	250cc	Honda NSR250	Burning Blood	1	0	0	0	0	0	NC
2007	250cc	Honda NSR250	Burning Blood Racing	1	0	0	0	0	0	NC
2008	250cc	Honda NSR250	Burning Blood Racing Team	1	0	0	0	0	0	NC
2015	MotoGP	Honda RC213V	Team HRC with Nissin	1	0	0	0	0	4	26th
2023	MotoGP	Honda RC213V	LCR Honda Castrol	0	0	0	0	0	0	NC
Total				**5**	**0**	**0**	**0**	**0**	**4**	

==== Races by year ====
(key) (Races in bold indicate pole position, races in italics indicate fastest lap)

Year	Class	Bike	1	2	3	4	5	6	7	8	9	10	11	12	13	14	15	16	17	18	19	20	Pos	Pts
2005	125cc	Honda	SPA	POR	CHN	FRA	ITA	CAT	NED	GBR	GER	CZE	JPN; 25	MAL	QAT	AUS	TUR	VAL					NC	0
2006	250cc	Honda	SPA	QAT	TUR	CHN	FRA	ITA	CAT	NED	GBR	GER	CZE	MAL	AUS	JPN; 23	POR	VAL					NC	0
2007	250cc	Honda	QAT	SPA	TUR	CHN	FRA	ITA	CAT	GBR	NED	GER	CZE	RSM	POR	JPN; Ret	AUS	MAL	VAL				NC	0
2008	250cc	Honda	QAT	SPA	POR	CHN	FRA	ITA	CAT	GBR	NED	GER	CZE	RSM	IND	JPN; 17	AUS	MAL	VAL				NC	0
2015	MotoGP	Honda	QAT	AME	ARG	SPA	FRA	ITA	CAT	NED	GER	IND	CZE	GBR	RSM	ARA	JPN; 12	AUS	MAL	VAL			26th	4
2023	MotoGP	Honda	POR	ARG	AME	SPA	FRA	ITA	GER	NED	GBR	AUT	CAT	RSM; DNQ	IND	JPN	INA	AUS	THA	MAL	QAT	VAL	NC	0

=== Superbike World Championship ===
==== Races by year ====
(key) (Races in bold indicate pole position, races in italics indicate fastest lap)

Year	Bike	1		2		3		4		5		6		7		8		9		10		11		12		13		Pos	Pts
Year	Bike	R1	R2	R1	R2	R1	R2	R1	R2	R1	R2	R1	R2	R1	R2	R1	R2	R1	R2	R1	R2	R1	R2	R1	R2	R1	R2	Pos	Pts
2017	Honda	AUS	AUS	THA	THA	SPA	SPA	NED	NED	ITA	ITA	GBR	GBR	ITA	ITA	USA	USA	GER	GER	POR; 15	POR; 10	FRA	FRA	SPA; 16	SPA; 15	QAT	QAT	29th	8

Year	Bike	1			2			3			4			5			6			7			8			9			10			11			12			13			Pos	Pts
Year	Bike	R1	SR	R2	R1	SR	R2	R1	SR	R2	R1	SR	R2	R1	SR	R2	R1	SR	R2	R1	SR	R2	R1	SR	R2	R1	SR	R2	R1	SR	R2	R1	SR	R2	R1	SR	R2	R1	SR	R2	Pos	Pts
2019	Honda	AUS	AUS	AUS	THA	THA	THA	SPA	SPA	SPA	NED	NED	NED	ITA	ITA	ITA	SPA	SPA	SPA	ITA	ITA	ITA	GBR	GBR	GBR	USA	USA	USA	POR; 15	POR; 17	POR; 17	FRA	FRA	FRA	ARG	ARG	ARG	QAT	QAT	QAT	28th	1
2020	Honda	AUS; Ret	AUS; 15	AUS; Ret	SPA; 18	SPA; 22	SPA; Ret	POR; 19	POR; 19	POR; 18	SPA; 15	SPA; 20	SPA; 18	SPA; 15	SPA; 21	SPA; 16	SPA; 19	SPA; 16	SPA; 14	FRA; 17	FRA; 19	FRA; 18	POR; 14	POR; 17	POR; 17																22nd	6

=== British Superbike Championship ===
==== By year ====
Year	Bike	1			2			3			4			5			6			7			8			9			10			11			Pos	Pts
Year	Bike	R1	R2	R3	R1	R2	R3	R1	R2	R3	R1	R2	R3	R1	R2	R3	R1	R2	R3	R1	R2	R3	R1	R2	R3	R1	R2	R3	R1	R2	R3	R1	R2	R3	Pos	Pts
2021	Honda	OUL; Ret	OUL; Ret	OUL; 17	KNO; 22	KNO; Ret	KNO; 21	BHGP; Ret	BHGP; Ret	BHGP; 19	THR; 20	THR; 15	THR; 21	DON; 21	DON; Ret	DON; Ret	CAD; 16	CAD; 16	CAD; Ret	SNE; 14	SNE; 21	SNE; 17	SIL; Ret	SIL; 22	SIL; DNS	OUL; 20	OUL; 17	OUL; 19	DON; 13	DON; 18	DON; 20	BHGP; 17	BHGP; 15	BHGP; 17	26th	7
2022	Honda	SIL; 16	SIL; 16	SIL; 17	OUL; 25	OUL; 21	OUL; 17	DON; 16	DON; 16	DON; 15	KNO; 21	KNO; 16	KNO; 15	BRH; 18	BRH; 13	BRH; 14	THR; 23	THR; 20	THR; 14	CAD; DNS	CAD; 20	CAD; 15	SNE; 11	SNE; Ret	SNE; 17	OUL; 16	OUL; 14	OUL; 16	DON; 14	DON; 15	DON; 15	BRH; 13	BRH; 13	BRH; 15	20th	28

==== Suzuka 8 Hours ====
Year	Team	Co-riders	Bike	Pos
2010	(Japan) MuSASHi RT HARC-PRO.	(Japan) Ryuichi Kiyonari (Japan) Takaaki Nakagami	Honda CBR1000RRW	1st
2013	(Japan) MuSASHi RT HARC-PRO.	(Netherlands) Michael van der Mark (United Kingdom) Leon Haslam	Honda CBR1000RRW	1st
2014	(Japan) MuSASHi RT HARC-PRO.	(Netherlands) Michael van der Mark (United Kingdom) Leon Haslam	Honda CBR1000RRW	1st
2022	(Japan) Team HRC	(Japan) Tetsuta Nagashima (Spain) Iker Lecuona	Honda CBR1000RR-R SP	1st
2023	(Japan) Team HRC	(Japan) Tetsuta Nagashima (Spain) Xavi Vierge	Honda CBR1000RR-R SP	1st
2024	(Japan) Team HRC	(France) Johann Zarco (Japan) Teppei Nagoe	Honda CBR1000RR-R SP	1st
2025	(Japan) Team HRC	(France) Johann Zarco	Honda CBR1000RR-R SP	1st
2026	(Japan) Team HRC	(United Kingdom) Jonathan Rea (Thailand) Somkiat Chantra	Honda CBR1000RR-R SP	1st

=== All Japan Road Race Championship ===
==== Races by year ====
(key) (Races in bold indicate pole position; races in italics indicate fastest lap)

Year	Class	Bike	1	2	3	4	5	6	7	8	9	10	11	Pos	Pts
2024	JSB1000	Honda	SUZ; 5	MOT1; 8	MOT2; 7	SUG1; 7	SUG2; 5	MOT; 6	AUT1; 5	AUT2; 3	OKA; 9	SUZ1; 6	SUZ2; 4	5th	121
2025	JSB1000	Honda	MOT; 4	SUG1	SUG2	MOT1	MOT2	AUT1	AUT2	OKA	SUZ1	SUZ2		20th	13
2026	JSB1000	Honda	MOT	SUG1	SUG2	AUT1	AUT2	MOT1	MOT2	OKA	SUZ1; 9	SUZ2; 2		15th	33
