= 2015 San Marino and Rimini Riviera motorcycle Grand Prix =

2015 San Marino and Rimini Riviera Grand Prix
Race details
- Race 13 of 18 races in the 2015 Grand Prix motorcycle racing season
- Date: 13 September 2015
- Official name: Gran Premio TIM di San Marino e della Riviera di Rimini
- Location: Misano World Circuit Marco Simoncelli
- Course: Permanent racing facility; 4.226 km (2.626 mi)

MotoGP
Pole position
Rider	(Spain) Jorge Lorenzo	Yamaha
Time	1:32.146	
Fastest lap
Rider	(Spain) Jorge Lorenzo	Yamaha
Time	1:33.273 on lap 4	
Podium
First	(Spain) Marc Márquez	Honda
Second	(United Kingdom) Bradley Smith	Yamaha
Third	(United Kingdom) Scott Redding	Honda

Moto2
Pole position
Rider	(France) Johann Zarco	Kalex
Time	1:36.754	
Fastest lap
Rider	(Germany) Jonas Folger	Kalex
Time	1:37.422 on lap 10	
Podium
First	(France) Johann Zarco	Kalex
Second	(Spain) Tito Rabat	Kalex
Third	(Japan) Takaaki Nakagami	Kalex

Moto3
Pole position
Rider	(Italy) Enea Bastianini	Honda
Time	1:42.486	
Fastest lap
Rider	(Italy) Niccolò Antonelli	Honda
Time	1:42.841 on lap 3	
Podium
First	(Italy) Enea Bastianini	Honda
Second	(Portugal) Miguel Oliveira	KTM
Third	(Italy) Niccolò Antonelli	Honda

The 2015 San Marino and Rimini Riviera motorcycle Grand Prix was the thirteenth round of the 2015 Grand Prix motorcycle racing season. It was held at the Misano World Circuit Marco Simoncelli in Misano Adriatico on 13 September 2015.

The MotoGP race started in dry conditions but as the race progressed, rain started to fall, forcing most of the riders to change to bikes with wet tyres. The rain eventually stopped halfway through the race and the final laps were completed in relatively dry track conditions. Factory Yamaha rider Jorge Lorenzo took his third pole position of the season but it was Marc Márquez who won the race after making a crucial second bike change before Valentino Rossi and Lorenzo. Bradley Smith and Scott Redding became the first pair of British riders to stand on a premier class podium since Barry Sheene and Tom Herron at the 1979 Venezuelan Grand Prix. Smith made a risky yet successful decision to stay on dry tyres for the whole duration of the race and achieved his second premier class podium in second place, while Redding achieved his maiden MotoGP podium with a third-place finish despite crashing earlier in the race.

Lorenzo and Rossi stayed out on wet tyres for a few laps longer than Márquez; this resulted in a fifth-place finish for Rossi and Lorenzo crashed out with eight laps remaining. Yonny Hernández and Alex de Angelis also crashed out while Pol Espargaró and wildcard Michele Pirro both retired. Loris Baz took his fourth victory in the Open category with a fourth-place finish. Although Rossi only managed to finish in fifth position, Lorenzo's retirement extended the championship gap between the two riders to 23 points.

In the junior classes, both pole-sitters won their respective races; Johann Zarco won his sixth race of the season in Moto2, while Enea Bastianini took his first Grand Prix victory in Moto3 after a final-lap pass on Miguel Oliveira.

== Classification ==
=== MotoGP ===
Pos.	No.	Rider	Team	Manufacturer	Laps	Time/Retired	Grid	Points
1	93	(Spain) Marc Márquez	Repsol Honda Team	Honda	28	48:23.819	2	25
2	38	(United Kingdom) Bradley Smith	Monster Yamaha Tech 3	Yamaha	28	+7.288	6	20
3	45	(United Kingdom) Scott Redding	EG 0,0 Marc VDS	Honda	28	+18.793	13	16
4	76	(France) Loris Baz	Forward Racing	Yamaha Forward	28	+26.427	16	13
5	46	(Italy) Valentino Rossi	Movistar Yamaha MotoGP	Yamaha	28	+33.196	3	11
6	9	(Italy) Danilo Petrucci	Octo Pramac Racing	Ducati	28	+35.087	9	10
7	29	(Italy) Andrea Iannone	Ducati Team	Ducati	28	+36.527	7	9
8	4	(Italy) Andrea Dovizioso	Ducati Team	Ducati	28	+37.434	8	8
9	26	(Spain) Dani Pedrosa	Repsol Honda Team	Honda	28	+39.516	4	7
10	41	(Spain) Aleix Espargaró	Team Suzuki Ecstar	Suzuki	28	+39.692	10	6
11	35	(United Kingdom) Cal Crutchlow	LCR Honda	Honda	28	+41.995	11	5
12	43	(Australia) Jack Miller	LCR Honda	Honda	28	+46.075	17	4
13	63	(France) Mike Di Meglio	Avintia Racing	Ducati	28	+48.381	22	3
14	25	(Spain) Maverick Viñales	Team Suzuki Ecstar	Suzuki	28	+52.325	14	2
15	19	(Spain) Álvaro Bautista	Aprilia Racing Team Gresini	Aprilia	28	+53.348	20	1
16	6	(Germany) Stefan Bradl	Aprilia Racing Team Gresini	Aprilia	28	+58.828	19	
17	69	(United States) Nicky Hayden	Aspar MotoGP Team	Honda	28	+1:02.649	23	
18	8	(Spain) Héctor Barberá	Avintia Racing	Ducati	28	+1:04.768	18	
19	50	(Republic of Ireland) Eugene Laverty	Aspar MotoGP Team	Honda	28	+1:05.677	21	
20	71	(Italy) Claudio Corti	Forward Racing	Yamaha Forward	27	+1 lap	24	
21	17	(Czech Republic) Karel Abraham	AB Motoracing	Honda	27	+1 lap	25	
Ret	44	(Spain) Pol Espargaró	Monster Yamaha Tech 3	Yamaha	26	Electronics	12	
Ret	99	(Spain) Jorge Lorenzo	Movistar Yamaha MotoGP	Yamaha	20	Accident	1	
Ret	68	(Colombia) Yonny Hernández	Octo Pramac Racing	Ducati	9	Accident	15	
Ret	15	(San Marino) Alex de Angelis	E-Motion IodaRacing Team	ART	9	Accident	26	
Ret	51	(Italy) Michele Pirro	Ducati Team	Ducati	9	Retirement	5	

=== Moto2 ===
Pos.	No.	Rider	Manufacturer	Laps	Time/Retired	Grid	Points
1	5	(France) Johann Zarco	Kalex	26	42:38.099	1	25
2	1	(Spain) Tito Rabat	Kalex	26	+3.850	3	20
3	30	(Japan) Takaaki Nakagami	Kalex	26	+5.388	8	16
4	3	(Italy) Simone Corsi	Kalex	26	+7.058	4	13
5	60	(Spain) Julián Simón	Speed Up	26	+9.225	10	11
6	94	(Germany) Jonas Folger	Kalex	26	+10.466	9	10
7	7	(Italy) Lorenzo Baldassarri	Kalex	26	+13.784	15	9
8	11	(Germany) Sandro Cortese	Kalex	26	+16.334	11	8
9	39	(Spain) Luis Salom	Kalex	26	+17.896	12	7
10	12	(Switzerland) Thomas Lüthi	Kalex	26	+18.353	13	6
11	49	(Spain) Axel Pons	Kalex	26	+24.029	14	5
12	19	(Belgium) Xavier Siméon	Kalex	26	+27.609	20	4
13	25	(Malaysia) Azlan Shah	Kalex	26	+29.037	22	3
14	4	(Switzerland) Randy Krummenacher	Kalex	26	+32.140	16	2
15	95	(Australia) Anthony West	Speed Up	26	+33.312	21	1
16	54	(Italy) Mattia Pasini	Kalex	26	+36.315	24	
17	23	(Germany) Marcel Schrötter	Tech 3	26	+37.245	19	
18	55	(Malaysia) Hafizh Syahrin	Kalex	26	+43.947	6	
19	96	(France) Louis Rossi	Tech 3	26	+43.986	30	
20	10	(Thailand) Thitipong Warokorn	Kalex	26	+52.354	31	
21	9	(Italy) Luca Marini	Kalex	26	+1:01.171	26	
22	66	(Germany) Florian Alt	Suter	26	+1:05.168	29	
23	97	(Spain) Xavi Vierge	Tech 3	25	+1 lap	28	
24	77	(Switzerland) Dominique Aegerter	Kalex	23	+3 laps	5	
Ret	64	(Italy) Federico Caricasulo	Kalex	18	Accident	27	
Ret	22	(United Kingdom) Sam Lowes	Speed Up	17	Rear Fender	7	
Ret	2	(Switzerland) Jesko Raffin	Kalex	15	Engine	32	
Ret	73	(Spain) Álex Márquez	Kalex	6	Accident	17	
Ret	70	(Switzerland) Robin Mulhauser	Kalex	5	Misfire	25	
Ret	36	(Finland) Mika Kallio	Kalex	2	Accident	23	
Ret	88	(Spain) Ricard Cardús	Suter	2	Accident	18	
DSQ	40	(Spain) Álex Rins	Kalex	22	Black flag	2	
OFFICIAL MOTO2 REPORT

=== Moto3 ===
Pos.	No.	Rider	Manufacturer	Laps	Time/Retired	Grid	Points
1	33	(Italy) Enea Bastianini	Honda	23	39:43.673	1	25
2	44	(Portugal) Miguel Oliveira	KTM	23	+0.037	6	20
3	23	(Italy) Niccolò Antonelli	Honda	23	+0.345	4	16
4	5	(Italy) Romano Fenati	KTM	23	+0.584	5	13
5	41	(South Africa) Brad Binder	KTM	23	+0.637	2	11
6	52	(United Kingdom) Danny Kent	Honda	23	+8.000	3	10
7	10	(France) Alexis Masbou	Honda	23	+11.654	12	9
8	21	(Italy) Francesco Bagnaia	Mahindra	23	+11.776	11	8
9	32	(Spain) Isaac Viñales	KTM	23	+11.839	10	7
10	65	(Germany) Philipp Öttl	KTM	23	+11.973	9	6
11	48	(Italy) Lorenzo Dalla Porta	Husqvarna	23	+12.187	8	5
12	11	(Belgium) Livio Loi	Honda	23	+12.214	20	4
13	16	(Italy) Andrea Migno	KTM	23	+12.532	21	3
14	29	(Italy) Stefano Manzi	Mahindra	23	+19.260	26	2
15	88	(Spain) Jorge Martín	Mahindra	23	+24.296	18	1
16	76	(Japan) Hiroki Ono	Honda	23	+25.724	13	
17	84	(Czech Republic) Jakub Kornfeil	KTM	23	+25.818	32	
18	40	(South Africa) Darryn Binder	Mahindra	23	+26.148	16	
19	17	(United Kingdom) John McPhee	Honda	23	+26.228	25	
20	91	(Argentina) Gabriel Rodrigo	KTM	23	+26.774	17	
21	98	(Czech Republic) Karel Hanika	KTM	23	+29.251	23	
22	19	(Italy) Alessandro Tonucci	Mahindra	23	+34.186	29	
23	12	(Italy) Matteo Ferrari	Mahindra	23	+35.384	28	
24	6	(Spain) María Herrera	Husqvarna	23	+41.319	24	
25	22	(Spain) Ana Carrasco	KTM	23	+56.219	30	
26	90	(Hungary) Adrián Gyutai	TVR	22	+1 lap	31	
Ret	58	(Spain) Juan Francisco Guevara	Mahindra	22	Accident	15	
Ret	63	(Malaysia) Zulfahmi Khairuddin	KTM	22	Engine	22	
Ret	24	(Japan) Tatsuki Suzuki	Mahindra	15	Electrics	19	
Ret	7	(Spain) Efrén Vázquez	Honda	14	Accident Damage	7	
Ret	2	(Australia) Remy Gardner	Mahindra	6	Accident	27	
Ret	95	(France) Jules Danilo	Honda	3	Accident	14	
DNS	55	(Italy) Andrea Locatelli	Honda		Did not start		
DNS	20	(France) Fabio Quartararo	Honda		Did not start		
DNS	9	(Spain) Jorge Navarro	Honda		Did not start		
OFFICIAL MOTO3 REPORT

== Championship standings after the race (MotoGP) ==
Below are the standings for the top five riders and constructors after round thirteen has concluded.

Riders' Championship standings

Pos.	Rider	Points
1	(Italy) Valentino Rossi	247
2	(Spain) Jorge Lorenzo	224
3	(Spain) Marc Márquez	184
4	(Italy) Andrea Iannone	159
5	(United Kingdom) Bradley Smith	135

Constructors' Championship standings

Pos.	Constructor	Points
1	(Japan) Yamaha	297
2	(Japan) Honda	240
3	(Italy) Ducati	197
4	(Japan) Suzuki	95
5	(Switzerland) Yamaha Forward	33

Teams' Championship standings

Pos.	Team	Points
1	(Japan) Movistar Yamaha MotoGP	491
2	(Japan) Repsol Honda Team	298
3	(Italy) Ducati Team	287
4	(France) Monster Yamaha Tech 3	216
5	(Japan) Team Suzuki Ecstar	135

- Note: Only the top five positions are included for all standings.

Previous race: 2015 British Grand Prix	FIM Grand Prix World Championship; 2015 season	Next race: 2015 Aragon Grand Prix
Previous race: 2014 San Marino Grand Prix	San Marino and Rimini Riviera motorcycle Grand Prix	Next race: 2016 San Marino Grand Prix
