= Loris Baz =

French motorcycle racer (born 1993)

- Baz in 2013
- Nationality: French
- Born: 1 February 1993 (age 33); Sallanches, France
- Current team: MGM Racing Performance
- Bike number: 76
Motorcycle racing career statistics
MotoGP World Championship
Active years	2015–2018
Manufacturers	Yamaha Forward, Ducati, KTM
Championships	0
2018 championship position	NC (0 pts)
Starts / Wins / Podiums / Poles / F. laps / Points; 49 / 0 / 0 / 0 / 0 / 108
Superbike World Championship
Active years	2012–2014, 2018–
Manufacturers	Kawasaki, BMW, Yamaha, Ducati
Championships	0
2026 championship position	23rd (7 pts)
Starts / Wins / Podiums / Poles / F. laps / Points; 214 / 2 / 20 / 2 / 3 / 1275

Loris Serge Yvan Baz (born 1 February 1993) is a French motorcycle racer. He most recently raced in the 2026 Superbike World Championship for the MGM Racing team, replacing the injured Tarran Mackenzie, and was competing full-time in the 2024 MotoAmerica Superbike Championship for the Warhorse Racing Ducati team. Baz is 1.91m (6' 3") tall, and is among the tallest active riders. He has previously competed in MotoGP between 2015 and 2018, World Superbikes for Ten Kate Racing, the FIM Superstock 1000 Championship, the British Superbike Championship, and the European Superstock 600 Championship, where he won the title in 2008.

== Career ==
=== Superbike World Championship (2012–2014) ===
Kawasaki Racing Team confirmed Baz for the 2013 Superbike World Championship season.

=== MotoGP World Championship (2015–2018) ===
On 4 October 2014, it was announced that Baz would move into MotoGP, with Forward Racing. At Misano in September, Baz achieved his best result with fourth place in changeable conditions. Baz finished his début season with 28 points, and was 17th in the final championship standings.

For the 2016 and 2017 seasons, Baz rode with the Avintia Racing team.

Baz made a one-off appearance at the 2018 British GP, replacing the injured Pol Espargaró in the factory KTM team. However, the race was cancelled due to dangerous track conditions following heavy rain and resurfacing.

=== Return to Superbike (2018–2020) ===
For the 2018 season, Baz returned to the Superbike World Championship riding for the Gulf Althea BMW Racing team.

=== MotoAmerica Superbike Championship (2021) ===
On 2 February 2021, American racing series MotoAmerica announced Baz would join the HSBK Racing Ducati team to compete in the United States during 2021, riding a Ducati Panigale V4 R. Baz finished the season in fourth place.

=== Superbike World Championship (2021–2023) ===
Baz acted as a replacement for the injured rider Chaz Davies, finishing sixth in race one and ninth in race two at Jerez, Spain in September. After a rider death in World Supersport, there were two main Superbike races only, with no Sprint (short distance) race.

=== Endurance World Championship ===
Whilst in Europe and following-on from riding World Superbikes, Baz rode as part of a three-man Moto Ain team on a Yamaha YZF-R1 in the last round of the 2021 FIM Endurance World Championship at Most, in the Czech Republic. Together with Randy De Puniet and Corentin Perolari, the team finished last (21st position) after progress was delayed by mid-race damage to the bike when being ridden by Perolari.

=== MotoAmerica King of The Baggers (2025) ===
Baz entered the King of the Baggers series in 2025 with the Indian Motorcycle S&S Cycle factory team.

== Career statistics ==
=== European Superstock 600 ===
==== Races by year ====
(key) (Races in bold indicate pole position, races in italics indicate fastest lap)

Year	Bike	1	2	3	4	5	6	7	8	9	10	Pos	Pts
2008	Yamaha	VAL; 1	ASS; 5	**MNZ**; 1	NÜR; 2	MIS; 3	BRN; 2	**BRA**; 1	DON; 12	MAG; 2	POR; 2	1st	186

=== FIM Superstock 1000 Cup ===
==== Races by year ====
(key) (Races in bold indicate pole position, races in italics indicate fastest lap)

Year	Bike	1	2	3	4	5	6	7	8	9	10	Pos	Pts
2009	Yamaha	SPA; Ret	NED; 6	ITA; 10	SMR; 9	GBR; 6	CZE; Ret	**GER**; 14	ITA; 10	FRA; 6	POR; 6	8th	61
2010	Yamaha	POR; 3	SPA; 5	NED; Ret	ITA; Ret	SMR; 6	CZE; 9	GBR; 6	GER; 5	ITA	FRA; Ret	8th	65
2011	Honda	NED	ITA	SMR	SPA	CZE	GBR	GER	ITA	FRA; Ret	POR; 7	19th	9
2012	Kawasaki	ITA; 2	NED; 6	ITA; Ret	SMR	SPA	CZE	GBR	GER	POR	FRA	14th	30

=== British Superbike Championship ===
==== Races by year ====
(key)

Year	Bike	1		2		3		4		5		6		7			8			9			10		11		12			Pos	Pts
Year	Bike	R1	R2	R1	R2	R1	R2	R1	R2	R1	R2	R1	R2	R1	R2	R3	R1	R2	R3	R1	R2	R3	R1	R2	R1	R2	R1	R2	R3	Pos	Pts
2010	Yamaha	BHI	BHI	THR	THR	OUL	OUL	CAD	CAD	MAL	MAL	KNO	KNO	SNE	SNE	SNE	BHGP	BHGP	BHGP	CAD	CAD		CRO; 7	CRO; Ret	SIL; 11	SIL; Ret	OUL; 10	OUL; 9	OUL; 6	20th	37
2011	Yamaha	BHI; 7	BHI; 13	OUL; 8	OUL; 9	CRO; 4	CRO; 5	THR; 25	THR; 11	KNO; 9	KNO; Ret	SNE; 9	SNE; 7	OUL; 7	OUL; C		BHGP	BHGP	BHGP	CAD	CAD	CAD	DON	DON	SIL	SIL	BHGP	BHGP	BHGP	14th	88

=== Superbike World Championship ===
==== By season ====
Season	Motorcycle	Team	Race	Win	Podium	Pole	FLap	Pts	Plcd
2012	Kawasaki Ninja ZX-10R	Kawasaki Racing Team	20	1	3	0	1	122	13th
2013	Kawasaki Ninja ZX-10R	Kawasaki Racing Team	17	1	2	0	0	180	8th
2014	Kawasaki Ninja ZX-10R	Kawasaki Racing Team	24	0	9	2	1	311	5th
2018	BMW S1000RR	Gulf Althea BMW Racing Team	25	0	0	0	0	137	11th
2019	Yamaha YZF-R1	Ten Kate Racing – Yamaha	23	0	0	0	0	138	10th
2020	Yamaha YZF-R1	Ten Kate Racing Yamaha	24	0	4	0	1	142	8th
2021	Ducati Panigale V4 R	Team GoEleven	6	0	2	0	0	53	14th
2022	BMW M1000RR	Bonovo Action BMW	36	0	0	0	0	125	12th
2023	BMW M1000RR	Bonovo Action BMW	35	0	0	0	0	60	16th
2026	Ducati Panigale V4 R	MGM Optical Express Racing	9	0	0	0	0	7	23rd
Total			**214**	**2**	**20**	**2**	**3**	**1275**	

==== Races by year ====
(key) (Races in bold indicate pole position, races in italics indicate fastest lap)

Year	Bike	1		2		3		4		5		6		7		8		9		10		11		12		13		14		Pos	Pts
Year	Bike	R1	R2	R1	R2	R1	R2	R1	R2	R1	R2	R1	R2	R1	R2	R1	R2	R1	R2	R1	R2	R1	R2	R1	R2	R1	R2	R1	R2	Pos	Pts
2012	Kawasaki	AUS	AUS	ITA	ITA	NED	NED	ITA	ITA	EUR; 16	EUR; 8	USA; 15	USA; 14	SMR; Ret	SMR; 8	SPA; Ret	SPA; 20	CZE; 3	CZE; 8	GBR; 1	GBR; 2	RUS; 11	RUS; 9	GER; Ret	GER; 8	POR; 7	POR; 7	FRA; 10	FRA; Ret	13th	122
2013	Kawasaki	AUS; 6	AUS; Ret	SPA; 5	SPA; 6	NED; 5	NED; 3	ITA; 7	ITA; 8	GBR; 5	GBR; 7	POR; 5	POR; 4	ITA; 9	ITA; 6	RUS; 8	RUS; C	GBR; 5	GBR; 1	GER; DNS	GER; DNS	TUR	TUR	USA	USA	FRA	FRA	SPA	SPA	8th	180
2014	Kawasaki	AUS; 5	AUS; 2	SPA; 2	SPA; 2	**NED**; 4	**NED**; 7	ITA; 4	ITA; 4	GBR; 2	GBR; 2	MAL; Ret	MAL; 5	SMR; 2	SMR; 2	POR; 3	POR; 6	USA; 9	USA; 6	**SPA**; Ret	**SPA**; 7	FRA; 5	FRA; 7	QAT; 2	QAT; 7					5th	311
2018	BMW	AUS; 11	AUS; 9	THA; 11	THA; 12	SPA; 11	SPA; 15	NED; 7	NED; 8	ITA; 13	ITA; 11	GBR; 7	GBR; 10	CZE; 18	CZE; 11	USA; 15	USA; 10	ITA; Ret	ITA; 9	POR; 6	POR; 9	FRA; 10	FRA; 10	ARG; 9	ARG; 11	QAT; 6	QAT; C			11th	137

Year	Bike	1			2			3			4			5			6			7			8			9			10			11			12			13			Pos	Pts
Year	Bike	R1	SR	R2	R1	SR	R2	R1	SR	R2	R1	SR	R2	R1	SR	R2	R1	SR	R2	R1	SR	R2	R1	SR	R2	R1	SR	R2	R1	SR	R2	R1	SR	R2	R1	SR	R2	R1	SR	R2	Pos	Pts
2019	Yamaha	AUS	AUS	AUS	THA	THA	THA	SPA	SPA	SPA	NED	NED	NED	ITA	ITA	ITA	SPA; 12	SPA; Ret	SPA; 9	ITA; 4	ITA; 12	ITA; 12	GBR; 4	GBR; 5	GBR; 6	USA; 8	USA; 7	USA; 7	POR; 16	POR; 9	POR; 6	FRA; 4	FRA; 7	FRA; 5	ARG; DNS	ARG; Ret	ARG; 12	QAT; 7	QAT; 7	QAT; 8	10th	138
2020	Yamaha	AUS; 7	AUS; 7	AUS; 8	SPA; 5	SPA; 4	SPA; 17	POR; 6	POR; 3	POR; Ret	SPA; 7	SPA; 9	SPA; Ret	SPA; 12	SPA; 11	SPA; 8	SPA; 14	SPA; 3	SPA; 10	FRA; 2	FRA; 6	FRA; 2	POR; 9	POR; Ret	POR; Ret																8th	142
2021	Ducati	SPA	SPA	SPA	POR	POR	POR	ITA	ITA	ITA	GBR	GBR	GBR	NED	NED	NED	CZE	CZE	CZE	SPA	SPA	SPA	FRA	FRA	FRA	SPA	SPA	SPA	SPA; 6	SPA; C	SPA; 9	POR; 3	POR; 3	POR; 4	ARG	ARG	ARG	INA	INA	INA	15th	53
2022	BMW	SPA; 11	SPA; 13	SPA; 7	NED; 6	NED; 6	NED; Ret	POR; 10	POR; Ret	POR; 12	ITA; 15	ITA; Ret	ITA; 10	GBR; 9	GBR; 9	GBR; 9	CZE; 11	CZE; 11	CZE; Ret	FRA; 14	FRA; 9	FRA; 9	SPA; 11	SPA; 9	SPA; 9	POR; 9	POR; 9	POR; 10	ARG; 16	ARG; 9	ARG; 17	INA; 10	INA; 12	INA; 13	AUS; 9	AUS; 10	AUS; 10				12th	125
2023	BMW	AUS; 18	AUS; 13	AUS; 15	INA; 11	INA; Ret	INA; DNS	NED; 17	NED; Ret	NED; Ret	SPA; 13	SPA; 18	SPA; 16	EMI; 17	EMI; 13	EMI; 12	GBR; Ret	GBR; 23	GBR; Ret	ITA; 8	ITA; 10	ITA; 7	CZE; 10	CZE; 12	CZE; 10	FRA; 13	FRA; 7	FRA; 12	SPA; 14	SPA; Ret	SPA; 13	POR; 18	POR; 12	POR; Ret	JER; 13	JER; 14	JER; 18				16th	60
2026	Ducati	AUS	AUS	AUS	POR	POR	POR	NED	NED	NED	HUN	HUN	HUN	CZE	CZE	CZE	ARA	ARA	ARA	EMI	EMI	EMI	GBR	GBR	GBR	FRA	FRA	FRA	ITA; 15	ITA; 15	ITA; 14	POR; 19	POR; 17	POR; Ret	SPA; 12	SPA; 16	SPA; 18				23rd	7

^{*} Season still in progress.

=== Grand Prix motorcycle racing ===
==== By season ====
Season	Class	Motorcycle	Team	Race	Win	Podium	Pole	FLap	Pts	Plcd
2015	MotoGP	Yamaha Forward	Forward Racing	17	0	0	0	0	28	17th
2016	MotoGP	Ducati	Avintia Racing	14	0	0	0	0	35	20th
2017	MotoGP	Ducati	Reale Avintia Racing	18	0	0	0	0	45	18th
2018	MotoGP	KTM	Red Bull KTM Factory Racing	0	0	0	0	0	0	NC
Total				**49**	**0**	**0**	**0**	**0**	**108**	

==== By class ====
Class	Seasons	1st GP	1st Pod	1st Win	Race	Win	Podiums	Pole	FLap	Pts	WChmp
MotoGP	2015–2018	2015 Qatar			49	0	0	0	0	108	0
Total	2015–2018				**49**	**0**	**0**	**0**	**0**	**108**	**0**

==== Races by year ====
(key) (Races in bold indicate pole position, races in italics indicate fastest lap)

Year	Class	Bike	1	2	3	4	5	6	7	8	9	10	11	12	13	14	15	16	17	18	19	Pos	Pts
2015	MotoGP	Yamaha Forward	QAT; 22	AME; 17	ARG; 14	SPA; Ret	FRA; 12	ITA; 12	CAT; 13	NED; 15	GER; 19	IND	CZE; 15	GBR; 16	RSM; 4	ARA; 17	JPN; Ret	AUS; 18	MAL; Ret	VAL; 19		17th	28
2016	MotoGP	Ducati	QAT; Ret	ARG; Ret	AME; 15	SPA; 13	FRA; 12	ITA; Ret	CAT	NED	GER; 17	AUT; 13	CZE; 4	GBR; DNS	RSM	ARA; 18	JPN; 16	AUS; Ret	MAL; 5	VAL; 18		20th	35
2017	MotoGP	Ducati	QAT; 12	ARG; 11	AME; Ret	SPA; 13	FRA; 9	ITA; 18	CAT; 12	NED; 8	GER; 19	CZE; Ret	AUT; 9	GBR; 15	RSM; 16	ARA; 21	JPN; 10	AUS; 18	MAL; Ret	VAL; 16		18th	45
2018	MotoGP	KTM	QAT	ARG	AME	SPA	FRA	ITA	CAT	NED	GER	CZE	AUT	GBR; C	RSM	ARA	THA	JPN	AUS	MAL	VAL	NC	0

=== FIM Endurance World Championship ===
Year	Team	Bike	Teammates	TC
2011	Yamaha Austria Racing Team	Yamaha YZF-R1	(Australia) Steve Martin (Slovenia) Igor Jerman (France) Gwen Giabbani (Japan) Katsuyuki Nakasuga (France) Loris Baz	5th
2013	(France) SRC Kawasaki	Kawasaki ZX-10R	(France) Grégory Leblanc (France) Loris Baz (France) Jérémy Guarnoni (France) Nicolas Salchaud (France) Fabien Foret	3rd
2019–20	Yamaha Austria Racing Team	Yamaha YZF-R1	(Germany) Marvin Fritz (Italy) Niccolò Canepa (Australia) Broc Parkes (Czech Republic) Karel Hanika	2nd

=== Suzuka 8 Hours results ===
Year	Team	Riders	Bike	Pos
2025	(Japan) AutoRace Ube Racing Team BMW	(Japan) Nomichi Uramoto (France) Loris Baz (United Kingdom) Davey Todd	BMW S1000RR	6th

=== Steel Commander MotoAmerica SuperBike Championship ===
==== Results ====
Year	Class	Team	1		2			3		4		5		6		7		8			9			Pos	Pts
Year	Class	Team	R1	R2	R1	R2	R3	R1	R2	R1	R2	R1	R2	R1	R2	R1	R2	R1	R2	R3	R1	R2	R3	Pos	Pts
2021	SuperBike	Ducati	ATL; Ret	ATL; 20	VIR; 4	VIR; 2		RAM; 2	RAM; Ret	TRD; 4	TRD; 3	LGS; 2	LGS; 2	BRA; DNS	BRA; 3	PIT; Ret	PIT; 5	NJR; 5	NJR; 4	NJR; 4	ALA; 3	ALA; 2	ALA; 3	4th	238
2024	SuperBike	Ducati	ATL; 6	ATL; 7	ALA; 5	ALA; 4	ALA; 18	RAM; 3	RAM; 4	BRA; 3	BRA; 4	**RID**; 8	**RID**; 4	MON; 6	MON; 6	OHI; Ret	OHI; 4	TEX; 4	TEX; 4	TEX; 5	**NJR**; 3	**NJR**; 1		5th	233

=== MotoAmerica King of The Baggers Championship ===
==== Results ====
Year	Class	Bike	1		2		3		4		5		6		7		Pos	Pts	Ref
Year	Class	Bike	R1	R2	R1	R2	R1	R2	R1	R2	R1	R2	R1	R2	R1	R2	Pos	Pts	Ref
2025	King of The Baggers	Indian	DAY; NC	DAY; 3	ATL; 1	ATL; 2	RAM; 10	RAM; 6	MON; 2	MON; 4	OHI	OHI	TEX	TEX	NJE	NJE	2nd*	110*	
