= Lorenzo Baldassarri =

Italian motorcycle racer

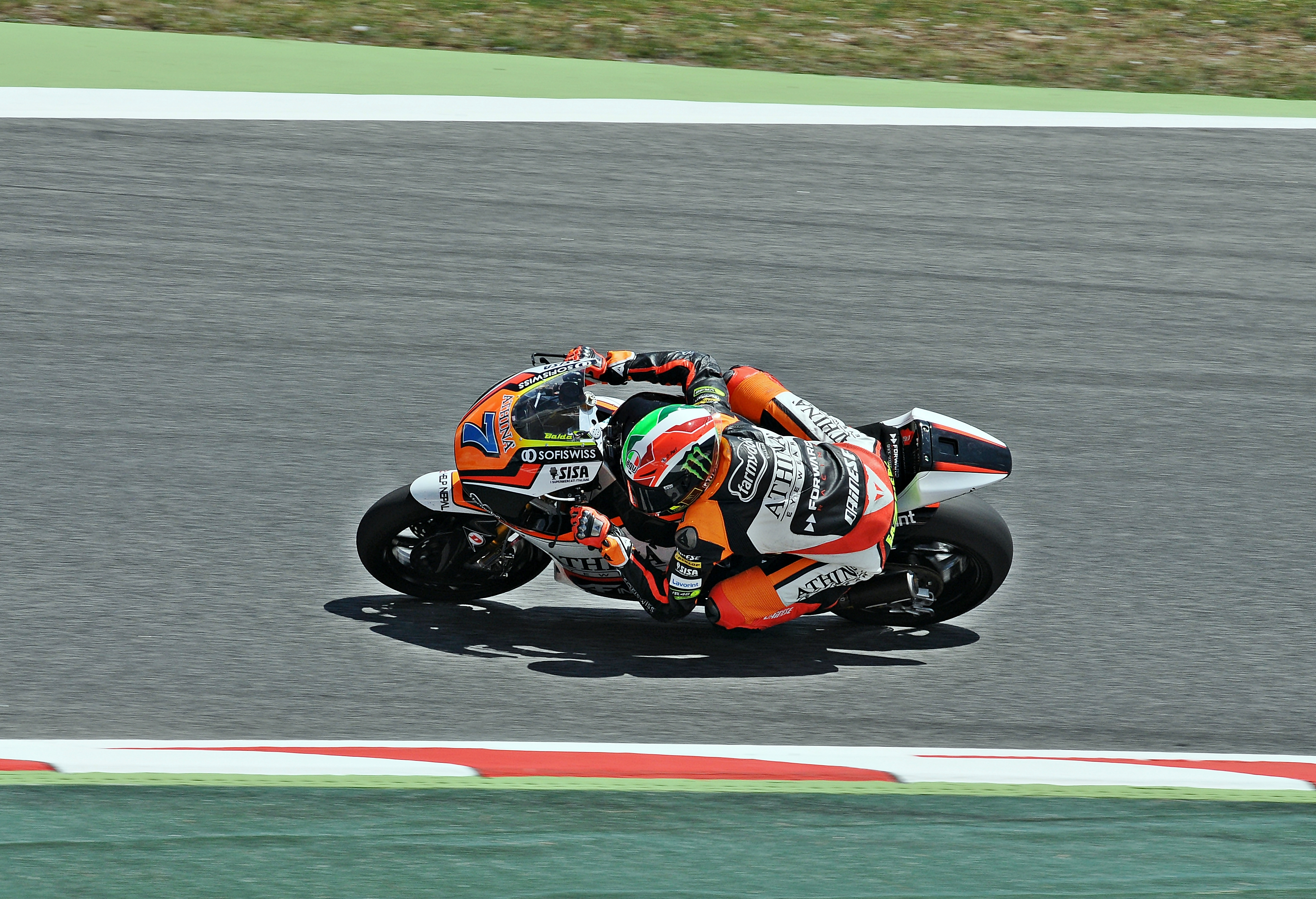
- Baldassarri at the 2015 Catalan Grand Prix
- Nationality: Italian
- Born: 6 November 1996 (age 30); San Severino Marche, Italy
- Current team: Team PATA GoEleven
- Bike number: 34
Motorcycle racing career statistics
Moto2 World Championship
Active years	2014–2021, 2023
Manufacturers	Suter, Kalex, MV Agusta
Championships	0
2021 championship position	31st (3 pts)
Starts / Wins / Podiums / Poles / F. laps / Points; 135 / 5 / 12 / 2 / 5 / 701
Moto3 World Championship
Active years	2013
Manufacturers	FTR Honda
Championships	0
2013 championship position	NC (0 pts)
Starts / Wins / Podiums / Poles / F. laps / Points; 17 / 0 / 0 / 0 / 0 / 0
MotoE World Championship
Active years	2025
Manufacturers	Ducati
Championships	0
2025 championship position	6th (159 pts)
Starts / Wins / Podiums / Poles / F. laps / Points; 14 / 0 / 3 / 0 / 2 / 159
Superbike World Championship
Active years	2023, 2026–
Manufacturers	Yamaha, Ducati
Championships	0
2026 championship position	6th (236 pts)
Starts / Wins / Podiums / Poles / F. laps / Points; 72 / 0 / 2 / 0 / 0 / 256
Supersport World Championship
Active years	2022, 2024
Manufacturers	Yamaha, Ducati, Triumph
Championships	0
2024 championship position	21st (28 pts)
Starts / Wins / Podiums / Poles / F. laps / Points; 41 / 4 / 16 / 4 / 3 / 416

Lorenzo Baldassarri (born 6 November 1996) is an Italian Grand Prix motorcycle racer who last competed in the 2025 MotoE World Championship with Dynavolt Intact GP. Baldassarri recently raced in the Supersport World Championship, finishing runner-up to Dominique Aegerter in the 2022 standings, but is best known for winning the 2011 Red Bull MotoGP Rookies Cup.

== Career ==
=== Junior career ===
Baldassarri won the 2011 Red Bull MotoGP Rookies Cup with incredible consistency, despite being just 14 years old when he won the title. He won just two races, compared to runner-up Arthur Sissis winning four, but never finished outside the points, and only once finished outside the top-six, while all his rivals had multiple retirements during the season. Baldassarri won the 2011 title with 208 points, over riders like Sissis, Philipp Öttl, Florian Alt, Brad Binder, Joe Roberts, and Andrea Migno.

At the age of 15, not being the minimum age of 16 to enter the Moto3 championship, Baldassarri returned to the Rookies Cup for the 2012 season, but struggled with motivation, winning the second race of the season in Jerez, and then never finishing on the podium again. He ended the year eighth in the standings, with 101 points.

=== Moto3 World Championship ===
Baldassarri made his Grand Prix motorcycle racing debut in the 2013 Moto3 World Championship, partnering Niccolò Antonelli at Gresini Racing team. His season was a big disappointment, failing to score points in any of the 17 races that year.

=== Moto2 World Championship ===
==== Gresini Moto2 (2014) ====
Still considered an elite talent, Baldassarri was promoted to Moto2 for the 2014 season, partnering Xavier Siméon at Gresini. Baldassarri fared better, scoring points in four races, an 11th place in Barcelona, a ninth place in Assen, a 14th place in Phillip Island, and a tenth place in Valencia, scoring 20 points total for the season, and finishing 25th in the standings.

==== Forward Racing Team (2015–2017) ====
Switching teams for the 2015 season, Baldassarri would ride for Athina Forward Racing, partnered by Simone Corsi. He had a good season, finishing in the points 12 times, finishing in the top-ten 10 times, and scoring his maiden podium in the category by finishing third in Australia. He ended the year ninth in the standings, with 96 points.

Staying with Forward Racing, Baldassarri's teammate for the 2016 season was Luca Marini. Baldassarri would improve again, upping last year's third place with a second place in his home GP in Mugello, and taking his first victory in the category, in also his home GP, in Rimini. He finished the season with 127 points, eighth in the overall standings.

The 2017 Moto2 World Championship was a down year for Baldassarri. He started the season with an eighth place in Qatar, and fourth place in Argentina, before crashing out in Le Mans and Mugello. He had another fourth place in Barcelona, but suffered a crash in Assen, causing him to miss the Dutch and the German GP, where he was replaced by Federico Fuligni. Baldassarri rode the rest of the season not fully fit to ride, and only finished with 51 points, 16th in the final standings.

==== Flexbox HP40 (2018–2020) ====
Baldassarri would switch teams for the 2018 Moto2 World Championship, leaving Forward Racing for HP40 Pons Racing on a three-year deal. Fully healed, he had a bounce-back year, starting the season with a second-place podium in Qatar, and a fourth place in Argentina. He absolutely dominated the weekend in Jerez, completing the weekend hattrick: pole position, fastest lap, and race win, and he did this by leading for every lap in the race as well. He finished second in his home GP in Mugello, making it three podiums in six races. The middle of his season was disappointing however, finishing outside of the points in the Netherlands, Germany, and Austria too. Baldassarri would finish off the season with one good race, and one bad race: he was third in Aragón, retired in Thailand (after starting from Pole position), was second in Japan, 22nd in Australia, sixth in Malaysia, and retired from the season closing race in Valencia. He finished fifth in the championship with 162 points, in front of riders like Joan Mir, Luca Marini, Fabio Quartararo, Iker Lecuona, and Remy Gardner.

The 2019 Moto2 World Championship would start incredibly well for Baldassarri, winning the first two races of the year in Qatar and Argentina, before crashing out from third in the USA. He would win the next race in Jerez, making it three wins out of four rounds. He would not get back on the podium for the rest of the season though, finishing with 171 points, and seventh in the championship standings.

The 2020 season started off well, with Baldassarri finishing the opening round at Qatar in second, but just like 2019, he could not score another podium for the remainder of the season, a fifth place in Valencia was as close as he got. He finished 12th in the standings, with only 71 points, and was not given a contract extension by Pons Racing.

==== MV Agusta Forward Racing (2021) ====
In his eighth Moto2 season, Baldassarri signed back with Forward Racing on a one-year contract, partnering Simone Corsi again. Forward Racing got its chassis and motorcycle from MV Agusta, who struggled to build a competitive bike for the 2021 season, the pair of riders only scoring 19 points throughout the whole year. Corsi finished with 16 points, a ninth place in Le Mans, a tenth place in Aragón, and a 13th place in Austin, while also qualifying himself to pole position in the season closer in Valencia, earning himself a ride for 2022. Baldassarri on the other hand had his worst season in the category, finishing in the points just twice, a 14th place in Portimao, and a 15th place in Jerez. He was not given a new contract, the team instead choosing to go with Corsi, and Marcos Ramírez for 2022.

=== Supersport World Championship ===
==== Evan Bros. WorldSSP Yamaha Team (2022) ====
Baldassarri competed in the 2022 Supersport World Championship, with the Evan Bros. WorldSSP Yamaha Team.

=== Superbike World Championship ===
==== GMT94 Yamaha (from 2023) ====
Baldassari graduated to Superbike World Championship riding for GMT94 Yamaha in the following season.

== Career statistics ==
=== Red Bull MotoGP Rookies Cup ===
==== Races by year ====
(key) (Races in bold indicate pole position, races in italics indicate fastest lap)

Year	1	2	3	4	5	6	7	8	9	10	11	12	13	14	15	Pos	Pts
2011	SPA1; 4	SPA2; 12	POR1; 3	POR2; 2	GBR1; 4	GBR2; 1	NED1; 1	NED2; 2	ITA; 4	GER1; 6	GER2; 4	CZE1; 6	CZE2; 6	RSM; 3		1st	208
2012	SPA1; 8	SPA2; 1	POR1; 14	POR2; 10	GBR1; 12	GBR2; 7	NED1; Ret	NED2; 11	GER1; 11	GER2; Ret	CZE1; 8	CZE2; 6	RSM; 7	ARA1; Ret	ARA2; 6	8th	101

=== CEV Buckler Moto3 Championship ===
==== Races by year ====
(key) (Races in bold indicate pole position, races in italics indicate fastest lap)

Year	Bike	1	2	3	4	5	6	7	Pos	Pts
2012	Suter Honda	JER; Ret	NAV; 7	ARA; 11	CAT; 4	ALB1; Ret	ALB2; 8	VAL; 7	8th	44

=== Grand Prix motorcycle racing ===
==== By season ====
Season	Class	Motorcycle	Team	Race	Win	Podium	Pole	FLap	Pts	Plcd
2013	Moto3	FTR Honda	GO&FUN Gresini Moto3	17	0	0	0	0	0	NC
2014	Moto2	Suter	Gresini Moto2	18	0	0	0	0	20	25th
2015	Moto2	Kalex	Athinà Forward Racing	17	0	1	0	0	96	9th
2016	Moto2	Kalex	Forward Team	17	1	2	0	0	127	8th
2017	Moto2	Kalex	Forward Racing Team	16	0	0	0	0	51	16th
2018	Moto2	Kalex	Pons HP40	18	1	5	2	4	162	5th
2019	Moto2	Kalex	Flexbox HP40	19	3	3	0	1	171	7th
2020	Moto2	Kalex	Flexbox HP40	15	0	1	0	0	71	12th
2021	Moto2	MV Agusta	MV Agusta Forward Racing	14	0	0	0	0	3	31st
2023	Moto2	Kalex	Fantic Racing	1	0	0	0	0	0	45th
2025	MotoE	Ducati	Dynavolt Intact GP	14	0	3	0	2	159	6th
Total				**166**	**5**	**15**	**2**	**7**	**860**	

==== By class ====
Class	Seasons	1st GP	1st Pod	1st Win	Race	Win	Podiums	Pole	FLap	Pts	WChmp
Moto3	2013	2013 Qatar			17	0	0	0	0	0	0
Moto2	2014–2021	2014 Qatar	2015 Australia	2016 San Marino	135	5	12	2	5	701	0
MotoE	2025	2025 France	2025 Netherlands		14	0	3	0	2	159	0
Total	2013–2023, 2025				**166**	**5**	**15**	**2**	**7**	**860**	**0**

==== Races by year ====
(key) (Races in bold indicate pole position; races in italics indicate fastest lap)

Year	Class	Bike	1	2	3	4	5	6	7	8	9	10	11	12	13	14	15	16	17	18	19	20	Pos	Pts
2013	Moto3	FTR Honda	QAT; 28	AME; Ret	SPA; 22	FRA; Ret	ITA; 23	CAT; 21	NED; 20	GER; Ret	INP; Ret	CZE; Ret	GBR; 18	RSM; 23	ARA; 26	MAL; 23	AUS; 24	JPN; 17	VAL; 20				NC	0
2014	Moto2	Suter	QAT; Ret	AME; Ret	ARG; 28	SPA; Ret	FRA; 20	ITA; 23	CAT; 11	NED; 9	GER; Ret	INP; 17	CZE; Ret	GBR; Ret	RSM; 25	ARA; 25	JPN; 17	AUS; 14	MAL; 17	VAL; 10			25th	20
2015	Moto2	Kalex	QAT; 10	AME; 26	ARG; 8	SPA; 13	FRA; 21	ITA; 10	CAT; 10	NED; Ret	GER; 8	INP	CZE; Ret	GBR; Ret	RSM; 7	ARA; 10	JPN; 12	AUS; 3	MAL; 5	VAL; 4			9th	96
2016	Moto2	Kalex	QAT; DNS	ARG; 13	AME; 23	SPA; 17	FRA; 17	ITA; 2	CAT; 14	NED; 5	GER; 5	AUT; 8	CZE; 16	GBR; 6	RSM; 1	ARA; 7	JPN; Ret	AUS; 4	MAL; 4	VAL; 14			8th	127
2017	Moto2	Kalex	QAT; 8	ARG; 4	AME; Ret	SPA; 11	FRA; Ret	ITA; Ret	CAT; 4	NED; DNS	GER	CZE; 18	AUT; Ret	GBR; 29	RSM; Ret	ARA; 13	JPN; 10	AUS; 14	MAL; Ret	VAL; 15			16th	51
2018	Moto2	Kalex	QAT; 2	ARG; 4	AME; 10	**SPA**; 1	FRA; Ret	ITA; 2	CAT; 7	NED; 26	GER; Ret	CZE; 4	AUT; 26	GBR; C	RSM; 6	ARA; 3	**THA**; Ret	JPN; 2	AUS; 22	MAL; 6	VAL; Ret		5th	162
2019	Moto2	Kalex	QAT; 1	ARG; 1	AME; Ret	SPA; 1	FRA; Ret	ITA; 4	CAT; Ret	NED; Ret	GER; 7	CZE; 11	AUT; 4	GBR; 7	RSM; 10	ARA; 8	THA; 25	JPN; 4	AUS; 5	MAL; 7	VAL; 17		7th	171
2020	Moto2	Kalex	QAT; 2	SPA; 8	ANC; Ret	CZE; 22	AUT; 11	STY; 15	RSM; 11	EMI; 25	CAT; Ret	FRA; 8	ARA; 20	TER; Ret	EUR; 5	VAL; 10	POR; 9						12th	71
2021	Moto2	MV Agusta	QAT; Ret	DOH; 20	POR; 14	SPA; 15	FRA; 17	ITA; Ret	CAT; 23	GER; Ret	NED	STY; 21	AUT; DNS	GBR; Ret	ARA	RSM; 24	AME; 22	EMI; 20	ALR; Ret	VAL; DNS			31st	3
2023	Moto2	Kalex	POR	ARG	AME	SPA	FRA	ITA	GER	NED	GBR	AUT	CAT	RSM	IND	JPN	INA; 23	AUS	THA	MAL	QAT	VAL	45th	0
2025	MotoE	Ducati	FRA1; 6	FRA2; 5	NED1; 6	NED2; 3	AUT1; 5	AUT2; 5	HUN1; 2	HUN2; 4	CAT1; 2	CAT2; 6	RSM1; 10	RSM2; 6	POR1; 5	POR2; Ret							6th	159

=== Supersport World Championship ===
==== By season ====
Season	Motorcycle	Team	Number	Race	Win	Podium	Pole	FLap	Pts	Plcd
2022	Yamaha YZF-R6	Evan Bros. WorldSSP Yamaha Team	7	24	4	16	4	3	388	**2nd**
2024	Ducati Panigale V2	Orelac Racing Verdnatura	7	5	0	0	0	0	28	21st
2024	Triumph Street Triple RS 765	WRP-RT Motorsport by SKM	7	12	0	0	0	0	28	21st
Total				**41**	**4**	**16**	**4**	**3**	**416**	

==== Races by year ====
(key) (Races in bold indicate pole position; races in italics indicate fastest lap)

Year	Bike	1		2		3		4		5		6		7		8		9		10		11		12		Pos	Pts
Year	Bike	R1	R2	R1	R2	R1	R2	R1	R2	R1	R2	R1	R2	R1	R2	R1	R2	R1	R2	R1	R2	R1	R2	R1	R2	Pos	Pts
2022	Yamaha	**SPA**; 1	**SPA**; 2	NED; Ret	NED; 2	POR; 2	POR; 3	ITA; 2	ITA; 2	GBR; 2	GBR; 2	**CZE**; 1	**CZE**; 1	FRA; 1	FRA; 5	SPA; 2	SPA; 4	POR; 2	POR; 7	ARG; 9	ARG; 3	INA; Ret	INA; 9	AUS; 4	AUS; 3	2nd	388
2024	Ducati	AUS; Ret	AUS; 9	SPA; 26	SPA; 16	NED; Ret	NED; DSQ																			21st	28
2024	Triumph							ITA; 14	ITA; 21	GBR; 14	GBR; 14	CZE; 15	CZE; 13	POR; 12	POR; Ret	FRA	FRA	ITA	ITA	SPA	SPA	POR; Ret	POR; 15	SPA; 10	SPA; Ret	21st	28

=== Superbike World Championship ===
==== By season ====
Season	Motorcycle	Team	Number	Race	Win	Podium	Pole	FLap	Pts	Plcd
2023	Yamaha YZF-R1	GMT94 Yamaha	34	36	0	0	0	0	20	18th
2026	Ducati Panigale V4 R	Team PATA GoEleven	34	36	0	2	0	0	236	6th
Total				**72**	**0**	**2**	**0**	**0**	**256**	

==== Races by year ====
(key) (Races in bold indicate pole position) (Races in italics indicate fastest lap)

Year	Bike	1			2			3			4			5			6			7			8			9			10			11			12			Pos	Pts
Year	Bike	R1	SR	R2	R1	SR	R2	R1	SR	R2	R1	SR	R2	R1	SR	R2	R1	SR	R2	R1	SR	R2	R1	SR	R2	R1	SR	R2	R1	SR	R2	R1	SR	R2	R1	SR	R2	Pos	Pts
2023	Yamaha	AUS; 17	AUS; 16	AUS; 16	INA; 15	INA; 15	INA; 14	NED; 16	NED; 20	NED; 13	SPA; 17	SPA; 17	SPA; Ret	EMI; 15	EMI; 12	EMI; Ret	GBR; 14	GBR; 16	GBR; 19	ITA; Ret	ITA; 18	ITA; 16	CZE; 16	CZE; Ret	CZE; Ret	FRA; Ret	FRA; 14	FRA; 13	SPA; 17	SPA; 21	SPA; 16	POR; 16	POR; 16	POR; 13	SPA; 12	SPA; 12	SPA; 15	18th	20
2026	Ducati	AUS; 3	AUS; 8	AUS; 9	POR; 11	POR; 10	POR; 6	NED; 8	NED; 13	NED; 6	HUN; Ret	HUN; 3	HUN; 4	CZE; 6	CZE; 4	CZE; 4	ARA; 6	ARA; Ret	ARA; Ret	EMI; Ret	EMI; 5	EMI; 15	GBR; 6	GBR; 6	GBR; 8	FRA; 6	FRA; 7	FRA; 4	ITA; 4	ITA; Ret	ITA; 7	POR; 6	POR; 9	POR; 6	SPA; 7	SPA; 7	SPA; 6	6th	236

=== CIV National 600 ===
==== Races by year ====
(key) (Races in bold indicate pole position; races in italics indicate fastest lap)

Year	Bike	1		2		3		4		5		6		Pos	Pts
Year	Bike	R1	R2	R1	R2	R1	R2	R1	R2	R1	R2	R1	R2	Pos	Pts
2022	Yamaha	MIS	MIS	VAL	VAL	**MUG**; 1	**MUG**; 1	MIS2	MIS2	MUG2	MUG2	IMO	IMO	11th	50

=== CIV Superbike Championship ===
==== By year ====
(key) (Races in bold indicate pole position; races in italics indicate fastest lap)

Year	Bike	Class	1		2		3		4		5		6		Pos	Pts
Year	Bike	Class	R1	R2	R1	R2	R1	R2	R1	R2	R1	R2	R1	R2	Pos	Pts
2025	Ducati	Production Bike	MIS1	MIS2	MUG1	MUG2	VAL1	VAL2	**MIS3**; 1	**MIS4**; 1	IMO1	IMO2	MUG3	MUG4	13th	50

Sporting positions
Preceded by Jacob Gagne	Red Bull MotoGP Rookies Cup; Champion; 2011	Succeeded by Florian Alt
