= 2015 Aragon motorcycle Grand Prix =

2015 Aragon Grand Prix
Race details
- Race 14 of 18 races in the 2015 Grand Prix motorcycle racing season
- Date: 27 September 2015
- Official name: Gran Premio Movistar de Aragón
- Location: MotorLand Aragón
- Course: Permanent racing facility; 5.078 km (3.155 mi)

MotoGP
Pole position
| Rider | (Spain) Marc Márquez | Honda |
| Time | 1:46.635 | |
Fastest lap
| Rider | (Spain) Jorge Lorenzo | Yamaha |
| Time | 1:48.120 on lap 2 | |
Podium
| First | (Spain) Jorge Lorenzo | Yamaha |
| Second | (Spain) Dani Pedrosa | Honda |
| Third | (Italy) Valentino Rossi | Yamaha |

Moto2
Pole position
| Rider | (Spain) Tito Rabat | Kalex |
| Time | 1:52.232 | |
Fastest lap
| Rider | (Spain) Álex Rins | Kalex |
| Time | 1:52.767 on lap 13 | |
Podium
| First | (Spain) Tito Rabat | Kalex |
| Second | (Spain) Álex Rins | Kalex |
| Third | (United Kingdom) Sam Lowes | Speed Up |

Moto3
Pole position
| Rider | (Italy) Enea Bastianini | Honda |
| Time | 1:57.755 | |
Fastest lap
| Rider | (Italy) Niccolò Antonelli | Honda |
| Time | 1:58.726 on lap 15 | |
Podium
| First | (Portugal) Miguel Oliveira | KTM |
| Second | (Spain) Jorge Navarro | Honda |
| Third | (Italy) Romano Fenati | KTM |

The 2015 Aragon motorcycle Grand Prix was the fourteenth round of the 2015 Grand Prix motorcycle racing season. It was held at the MotorLand Aragón in Alcañiz on 27 September 2015.

In the MotoGP class, Marc Márquez took his seventh pole position of the season and broke his fastest lap qualifying record where he set the fastest lap record since 2014; with 1:46.645 — but he crashed out of the race on the second lap while pursuing Jorge Lorenzo, who was the winner. Second place was battled between Dani Pedrosa and Valentino Rossi, with Pedrosa eventually prevailing ahead of Rossi. Andrea Iannone, who was despite riding with his second time dislocated left shoulder, had qualified in third position, but he dropped into a fourth-place finish; lies 12 points behind Márquez for third position. Toni Elías, who previously replaced Karel Abraham (retired from the race due to foot injury) at 2015 Indianapolis Grand Prix, replacing Claudio Corti with Forward Racing; could only finish in twenty-first place. With Márquez retirement, Lorenzo and Rossi were on the podium; the Movistar Yamaha clinched the Teams Championship title; the first title since 2010.

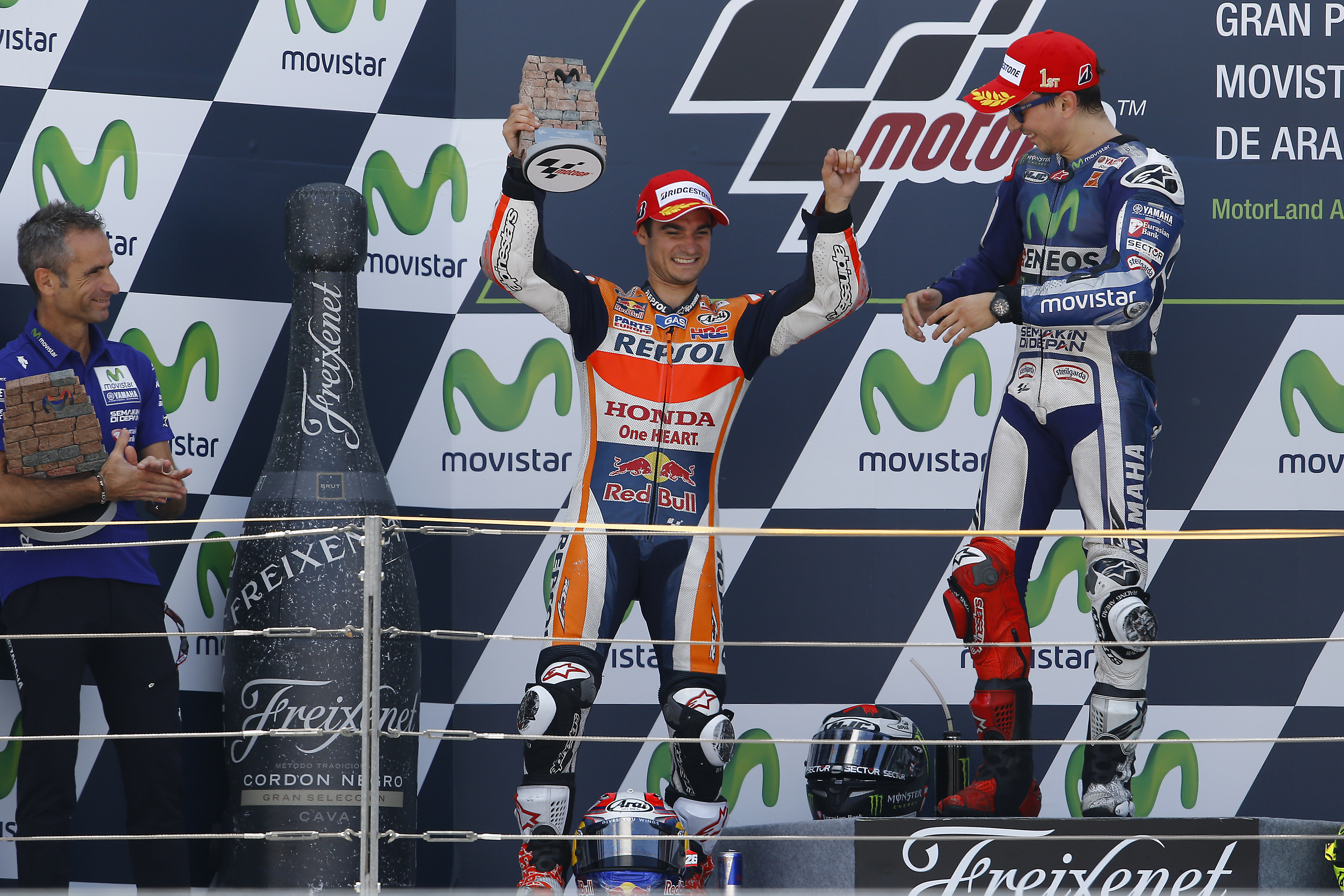
Dani Pedrosa and Jorge Lorenzo, celebrating on the podium after finishing second and first at the MotoGP race.

== Classification ==
=== MotoGP ===
| Pos. | No. | Rider | Team | Manufacturer | Laps | Time/Retired | Grid | Points |
|---|---|---|---|---|---|---|---|---|
| 1 | 99 | (Spain) Jorge Lorenzo | Movistar Yamaha MotoGP | Yamaha | 23 | 41:44.933 | 2 | 25 |
| 2 | 26 | (Spain) Dani Pedrosa | Repsol Honda Team | Honda | 23 | +2.683 | 5 | 20 |
| 3 | 46 | (Italy) Valentino Rossi | Movistar Yamaha MotoGP | Yamaha | 23 | +2.773 | 6 | 16 |
| 4 | 29 | (Italy) Andrea Iannone | Ducati Team | Ducati | 23 | +7.858 | 3 | 13 |
| 5 | 4 | (Italy) Andrea Dovizioso | Ducati Team | Ducati | 23 | +24.322 | 13 | 11 |
| 6 | 41 | (Spain) Aleix Espargaró | Team Suzuki Ecstar | Suzuki | 23 | +24.829 | 7 | 10 |
| 7 | 35 | (United Kingdom) Cal Crutchlow | LCR Honda | Honda | 23 | +25.367 | 8 | 9 |
| 8 | 38 | (United Kingdom) Bradley Smith | Monster Yamaha Tech 3 | Yamaha | 23 | +25.503 | 10 | 8 |
| 9 | 44 | (Spain) Pol Espargaró | Monster Yamaha Tech 3 | Yamaha | 23 | +26.452 | 4 | 7 |
| 10 | 68 | (Colombia) Yonny Hernández | Octo Pramac Racing | Ducati | 23 | +43.889 | 11 | 6 |
| 11 | 25 | (Spain) Maverick Viñales | Team Suzuki Ecstar | Suzuki | 23 | +44.255 | 12 | 5 |
| 12 | 45 | (United Kingdom) Scott Redding | EG 0,0 Marc VDS | Honda | 23 | +48.176 | 14 | 4 |
| 13 | 19 | (Spain) Álvaro Bautista | Aprilia Racing Team Gresini | Aprilia | 23 | +49.755 | 21 | 3 |
| 14 | 50 | (Republic of Ireland) Eugene Laverty | Aspar MotoGP Team | Honda | 23 | +50.271 | 15 | 2 |
| 15 | 69 | (United States) Nicky Hayden | Aspar MotoGP Team | Honda | 23 | +50.364 | 16 | 1 |
| 16 | 8 | (Spain) Héctor Barberá | Avintia Racing | Ducati | 23 | +50.722 | 19 | |
| 17 | 76 | (France) Loris Baz | Forward Racing | Yamaha Forward | 23 | +51.997 | 22 | |
| 18 | 6 | (Germany) Stefan Bradl | Aprilia Racing Team Gresini | Aprilia | 23 | +53.406 | 17 | |
| 19 | 43 | (Australia) Jack Miller | LCR Honda | Honda | 23 | +56.859 | 20 | |
| 20 | 63 | (France) Mike Di Meglio | Avintia Racing | Ducati | 23 | +59.607 | 18 | |
| 21 | 24 | (Spain) Toni Elías | Forward Racing | Yamaha Forward | 23 | +1:15.237 | 25 | |
| Ret | 17 | (Czech Republic) Karel Abraham | AB Motoracing | Honda | 11 | Foot Injury | 23 | |
| Ret | 9 | (Italy) Danilo Petrucci | Octo Pramac Racing | Ducati | 9 | Accident | 9 | |
| Ret | 15 | (San Marino) Alex de Angelis | E-Motion IodaRacing Team | ART | 5 | Accident | 24 | |
| Ret | 93 | (Spain) Marc Márquez | Repsol Honda Team | Honda | 1 | Accident | 1 | |

=== Moto2 ===
The first attempt to run the race was interrupted following an accident involving Dominique Aegerter and Xavier Siméon. For the restart, the race distance was reduced from 21 to 14 laps.

| Pos. | No. | Rider | Manufacturer | Laps | Time/Retired | Grid | Points |
|---|---|---|---|---|---|---|---|
| 1 | 1 | (Spain) Tito Rabat | Kalex | 14 | 26:25.125 | 1 | 25 |
| 2 | 40 | (Spain) Álex Rins | Kalex | 14 | +0.096 | 2 | 20 |
| 3 | 22 | (United Kingdom) Sam Lowes | Speed Up | 14 | +5.364 | 4 | 16 |
| 4 | 94 | (Germany) Jonas Folger | Kalex | 14 | +7.363 | 7 | 13 |
| 5 | 12 | (Switzerland) Thomas Lüthi | Kalex | 14 | +16.723 | 8 | 11 |
| 6 | 5 | (France) Johann Zarco | Kalex | 14 | +16.989 | 3 | 10 |
| 7 | 55 | (Malaysia) Hafizh Syahrin | Kalex | 14 | +17.086 | 13 | 9 |
| 8 | 30 | (Japan) Takaaki Nakagami | Kalex | 14 | +18.056 | 5 | 8 |
| 9 | 3 | (Italy) Simone Corsi | Kalex | 14 | +18.658 | 11 | 7 |
| 10 | 7 | (Italy) Lorenzo Baldassarri | Kalex | 14 | +19.656 | 12 | 6 |
| 11 | 36 | (Finland) Mika Kallio | Speed Up | 14 | +20.090 | 15 | 5 |
| 12 | 49 | (Spain) Axel Pons | Kalex | 14 | +20.222 | 9 | 4 |
| 13 | 11 | (Germany) Sandro Cortese | Kalex | 14 | +21.043 | 10 | 3 |
| 14 | 25 | (Malaysia) Azlan Shah | Kalex | 14 | +22.384 | 17 | 2 |
| 15 | 23 | (Germany) Marcel Schrötter | Tech 3 | 14 | +26.017 | 21 | 1 |
| 16 | 97 | (Spain) Xavi Vierge | Tech 3 | 14 | +34.464 | 27 | |
| 17 | 4 | (Switzerland) Randy Krummenacher | Kalex | 14 | +34.658 | 19 | |
| 18 | 88 | (Spain) Ricard Cardús | Suter | 14 | +34.727 | 22 | |
| 19 | 70 | (Switzerland) Robin Mulhauser | Kalex | 14 | +37.335 | 26 | |
| 20 | 2 | (Switzerland) Jesko Raffin | Kalex | 14 | +44.018 | 30 | |
| 21 | 66 | (Germany) Florian Alt | Suter | 14 | +44.275 | 29 | |
| 22 | 10 | (Thailand) Thitipong Warokorn | Kalex | 14 | +44.604 | 28 | |
| 23 | 96 | (France) Louis Rossi | Tech 3 | 14 | +54.320 | 25 | |
| Ret | 32 | (Italy) Federico Fuligni | Suter | 13 | Retirement | 24 | |
| Ret | 73 | (Spain) Álex Márquez | Kalex | 7 | Accident | 6 | |
| Ret | 60 | (Spain) Julián Simón | Speed Up | 4 | Accident | 16 | |
| Ret | 57 | (Spain) Edgar Pons | Kalex | 3 | Accident | 23 | |
| Ret | 19 | (Belgium) Xavier Siméon | Kalex | 2 | Accident | 18 | |
| Ret | 39 | (Spain) Luis Salom | Kalex | 2 | Accident | 20 | |
| DNS | 77 | (Switzerland) Dominique Aegerter | Kalex | 0 | Did not restart | 14 | |
| DNS | 64 | (Italy) Federico Caricasulo | Kalex | | Did not start | | |
OFFICIAL MOTO2 REPORT

=== Moto3 ===
| Pos. | No. | Rider | Manufacturer | Laps | Time/Retired | Grid | Points |
|---|---|---|---|---|---|---|---|
| 1 | 44 | (Portugal) Miguel Oliveira | KTM | 20 | 39:54.343 | 2 | 25 |
| 2 | 9 | (Spain) Jorge Navarro | Honda | 20 | +0.193 | 5 | 20 |
| 3 | 5 | (Italy) Romano Fenati | KTM | 20 | +1.505 | 10 | 16 |
| 4 | 7 | (Spain) Efrén Vázquez | Honda | 20 | +1.792 | 8 | 13 |
| 5 | 65 | (Germany) Philipp Öttl | KTM | 20 | +2.466 | 9 | 11 |
| 6 | 23 | (Italy) Niccolò Antonelli | Honda | 20 | +4.903 | 6 | 10 |
| 7 | 88 | (Spain) Jorge Martín | Mahindra | 20 | +6.512 | 4 | 9 |
| 8 | 10 | (France) Alexis Masbou | Honda | 20 | +15.746 | 7 | 8 |
| 9 | 16 | (Italy) Andrea Migno | KTM | 20 | +15.884 | 20 | 7 |
| 10 | 76 | (Japan) Hiroki Ono | Honda | 20 | +15.775 (Note: One position penalty for overtaking under yellow flags.) | 19 | 6 |
| 11 | 21 | (Italy) Francesco Bagnaia | Mahindra | 20 | +16.260 | 17 | 5 |
| 12 | 29 | (Italy) Stefano Manzi | Mahindra | 20 | +16.354 | 21 | 4 |
| 13 | 6 | (Spain) María Herrera | Husqvarna | 20 | +16.899 | 30 | 3 |
| 14 | 84 | (Czech Republic) Jakub Kornfeil | KTM | 20 | +16.849 | 12 | 2 |
| 15 | 11 | (Belgium) Livio Loi | Honda | 20 | +17.125 | 15 | 1 |
| 16 | 24 | (Japan) Tatsuki Suzuki | Mahindra | 20 | +17.560 | 26 | |
| 17 | 17 | (United Kingdom) John McPhee | Honda | 20 | +17.690 | 14 | |
| 18 | 81 | (Japan) Sena Yamada | Honda | 20 | +31.050 | 22 | |
| 19 | 2 | (Australia) Remy Gardner | Mahindra | 20 | +31.159 | 29 | |
| 20 | 91 | (Argentina) Gabriel Rodrigo | KTM | 20 | +31.180 | 32 | |
| 21 | 58 | (Spain) Juan Francisco Guevara | Mahindra | 20 | +31.349 | 18 | |
| 22 | 95 | (France) Jules Danilo | Honda | 20 | +31.383 | 24 | |
| 23 | 19 | (Italy) Alessandro Tonucci | Mahindra | 20 | +31.759 | 28 | |
| 24 | 48 | (Italy) Lorenzo Dalla Porta | Husqvarna | 20 | +43.715 | 23 | |
| 25 | 89 | (Malaysia) Khairul Idham Pawi | Honda | 20 | +47.945 | 34 | |
| 26 | 37 | (Italy) Davide Pizzoli | Husqvarna | 20 | +48.082 | 33 | |
| 27 | 22 | (Spain) Ana Carrasco | KTM | 20 | +48.165 | 35 | |
| Ret | 41 | (South Africa) Brad Binder | KTM | 19 | Accident | 11 | |
| Ret | 52 | (United Kingdom) Danny Kent | Honda | 19 | Accident | 3 | |
| Ret | 33 | (Italy) Enea Bastianini | Honda | 19 | Accident | 1 | |
| Ret | 98 | (Czech Republic) Karel Hanika | KTM | 13 | Accident | 13 | |
| Ret | 96 | (Italy) Manuel Pagliani | Mahindra | 13 | Retirement | 31 | |
| Ret | 63 | (Malaysia) Zulfahmi Khairuddin | KTM | 13 | Loose Chain | 16 | |
| Ret | 32 | (Spain) Isaac Viñales | KTM | 12 | Accident | 27 | |
| Ret | 40 | (South Africa) Darryn Binder | Mahindra | 12 | Accident | 25 | |
| DNS | 55 | (Italy) Andrea Locatelli | Honda | | Did not start | | |
OFFICIAL MOTO3 REPORT

== Championship standings after the race (MotoGP) ==
Below are the standings for the top seven riders and constructors after round fourteen has concluded.

Riders' Championship standings

| Pos. | Rider | Points |
|---|---|---|
| 1 | (Italy) Valentino Rossi | 263 |
| 2 | (Spain) Jorge Lorenzo | 249 |
| 3 | (Spain) Marc Márquez | 184 |
| 4 | (Italy) Andrea Iannone | 172 |
| 5 | (United Kingdom) Bradley Smith | 143 |
| 6 | (Italy) Andrea Dovizioso | 139 |
| 7 | (Spain) Dani Pedrosa | 129 |

Constructors' Championship standings

| Pos. | Constructor | Points |
|---|---|---|
| 1 | (Japan) Yamaha | 322 |
| 2 | (Japan) Honda | 260 |
| 3 | (Italy) Ducati | 210 |
| 4 | (Japan) Suzuki | 105 |
| 5 | (Switzerland) Yamaha Forward | 33 |
| 6 | (Italy) Aprilia | 26 |
| 7 | (Italy) ART | 2 |

Teams' Championship standings

| Pos. | Team | Points |
|---|---|---|
| 1 | (Japan) Movistar Yamaha MotoGP | 512 |
| 2 | (Japan) Repsol Honda Team | 318 |
| 3 | (Italy) Ducati Team | 311 |
| 4 | (France) Monster Yamaha Tech 3 | 231 |
| 5 | (Japan) Team Suzuki Ecstar | 150 |
| 6 | (Italy) Octo Pramac Racing | 140 |
| 7 | (Monaco) LCR Honda | 104 |

- Note: Only the top seven positions are included for both sets of standings.

== Notes ==
| Previous race: 2015 San Marino Grand Prix | FIM Grand Prix World Championship; 2015 season | Next race: 2015 Japanese Grand Prix |
| Previous race: 2014 Aragon Grand Prix | Aragon motorcycle Grand Prix | Next race: 2016 Aragon Grand Prix |
