= Roberta Ponziani =

Italian motorcycle racer

- Born: August 4, 1996 (age 30); Teramo, Italy
- Occupation: Motorcycle racer
- Current series: FIM Women's Circuit Racing World Championship
- Current team: Klint Forward Team
- Previous teams: Yamaha Motoxracing team
- Bike number: 96
- Website: www.robertaponziani.com

Championship titles
- 2023 Supersport 300 Women’s European Champion
Statistics
Women's Circuit Racing World Championship
| Active years | 2024- |
| Current team | Klint Forward Team |
| Last season (2026) | 4th (0 win/ 143 pts) |
Starts / Wins / Podiums / Poles / F. laps / Points; 36 / 1 / 6 / 0 / 5 / 434

Roberta Ponziani (Teramo, Italy, 4 August 1996) is an Italian motorcycle racer who currently competes in the FIM Women's Circuit Racing World Championship.

== Career ==
=== The beginnings ===
Fascinated by the motorcycle races seen on the mini-bike track near her home, Ponziani convinced her father to let her try a motorbike. She then began to compete at the age of nine. In the two-year period 2014-2015, she was champion of the CIV Junior Minimoto. In 2016, she took part in the Italian R3 Cup, an event that she competed in until 2019, the year in which she ranked eleventh overall and first among women. From 2020 to 2023, she was involved in the European Women's Cup where she ranked third four times. The series was upgraded to a championship in 2023, the Supersport 300 Women’s European Championship, and Ponziani was the first champion. Ponziani also competed in the 2022 ESkootr Championship.

=== WCR World Championship ===
In 2024, Ponziani was a regular rider in the inaugural edition of the WCR World Championship riding for the Yamaha Motoxracing team. Despite the greater experience and preparation of her Spanish colleagues, she still managed to consistently obtain important placings (she never finished lower than seventh in the races she completed). On the occasion of the Cremona Grand Prix, thanks to the fastest lap in race one, she ensured the start in first position for the second race: on this occasion she achieved her first world championship podium by finishing second. At the end of the season, she was fifth overall and her move to Klint Forward Team for 2025 alongside vice-champion María Herrera was announced.

In 2025, Ponziani won at Cremona and finished fourth overall in the season's standings.

== Career statistics ==
=== Women's Circuit Racing World Championship ===
(key) (Races in bold indicate pole position; races in italics indicate fastest lap)

| Year | Bike | 1 | 2 | 3 | 4 | 5 | 6 | 7 | 8 | 9 | 10 | 11 | 12 | Pos | Pts | Refs |
|---|---|---|---|---|---|---|---|---|---|---|---|---|---|---|---|---|
| 2024 | Yamaha YZF-R7 | MIS1; 4 | MIS2; 5 | DON1; 5 | DON2; Ret | ARG1; 6 | ARG2; 5 | CRE1; 4 | **CRE2**; 2 | EST1; 7 | EST1; 5 | JER1; 4 | JER2; 4 | 5th | 135 | |
| 2025 | Yamaha YZF-R7 | ASS1; 5 | ASS2; 4 | CRE1; 1 | **CRE2**; 2 | DON1; 10 | DON2; 5 | BAL1; 4 | **BAL2**; 4 | MAG1; 4 | MAG2; 5 | JER1; 5 | JER2; 7 | 4th | 156 | |
| 2026 | Yamaha YZF-R7 | POR1; 6 | POR1; 4 | ASS1; 3 | ASS2; 4 | BAL1; 4 | BAL2; 5 | MIS1; Ret | **MIS2**; 4 | DON1; 4 | DON2; 3 | JER1; 3 | JER2; 5 | 4th | 143 | |
