= Simone Corsi =

Italian motorcycle racer

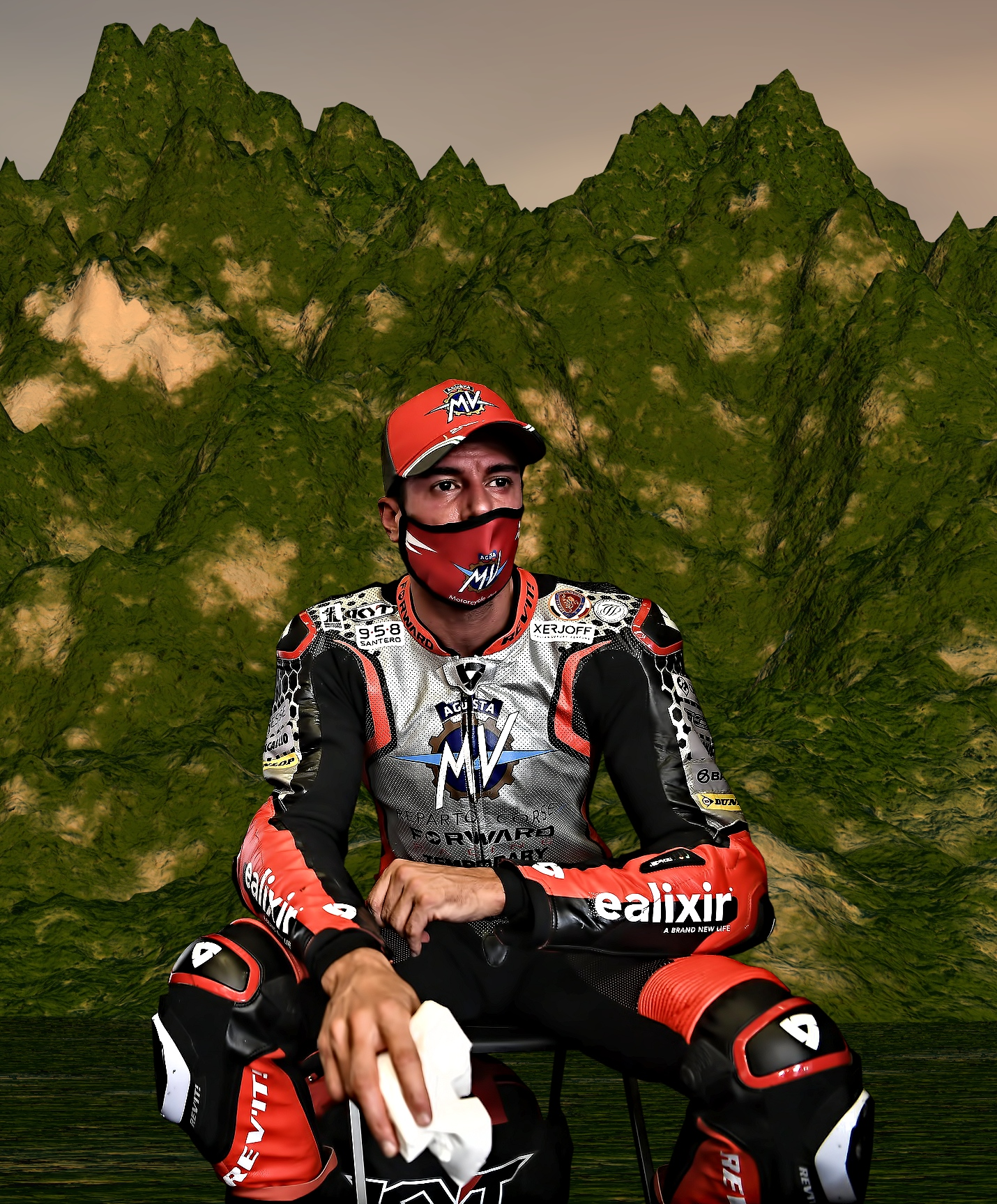
- Corsi in 2020
- Nationality: Italian
- Born: 24 April 1987 (age 39); Rome, Italy
- Current team: Sporting director for Forward Racing
Motorcycle racing career statistics
Moto2 World Championship
Active years	2010–2022, 2024
Manufacturers	Motobi, FTR, Speed Up, Forward KLX, Kalex, NTS, MV Agusta, Forward
2024 championship position	40th (0 pts)
Starts / Wins / Podiums / Poles / F. laps / Points; 210 / 0 / 9 / 2 / 0 / 961
250cc World Championship
Active years	2005
Manufacturers	Aprilia
2005 championship position	14th (59 pts)
Starts / Wins / Podiums / Poles / F. laps / Points; 16 / 0 / 0 / 0 / 0 / 59
125cc World Championship
Active years	2002–2004, 2006–2009
Manufacturers	Honda, Gilera, Aprilia
2009 championship position	11th (81 pts)
Starts / Wins / Podiums / Poles / F. laps / Points; 95 / 5 / 12 / 3 / 2 / 646
Supersport World Championship
Active years	2023–2024
Manufacturers	Yamaha, Ducati
2024 championship position	15th (60 pts)
Starts / Wins / Podiums / Poles / F. laps / Points; 28 / 0 / 0 / 0 / 0 / 93

Simone Corsi (born 24 April 1987) is an Italian Grand Prix motorcycle sporting director, and former rider. Born in Rome, Corsi has been racing in motorcycle world championships for twenty years, amassing over 300 races, 5th all-time, behind only Valentino Rossi, Andrea Dovizioso, Aleix Espargaró and Loris Capirossi. He most recently competed in the Supersport World Championship for Ducati, winning the 2024 WorldSSP Challenge, and currently serves as the sporting director for Forward Racing in Moto2.

== Career ==
=== 125cc World Championship ===
Corsi's first Grand Prix race was in the 125cc category, in 2002 at Mugello, and riding a Honda RS125R he finished the race in 22nd. From the following year on, he would compete regularly in the world championship's levels.

==== Kopron Team Scot (2003–2004) ====
In 2003, Corsi rode a Honda for Scot Racing Team, along with teammate Andrea Dovizioso. He achieved nine point scoring finishes, a season's best result of ninth in two races, and finished 19th in the final standings with 32 points.

In the following year, Corsi improved, finishing in the points ten times, finishing in the top-ten four times, and scoring his first podium with a third place in Japan, with Dovizioso winning the race. Corsi ended the season 13th in the final standings with 61 points, while his teammate Dovizioso won the World Championship title with 293 points.

=== 250cc World Championship ===
For 2005, both Corsi and Dovizioso moved up to 250cc, but were now riding different bikes. Corsi had a good first half of the year, as he finished in the points in seven of the eight races. However, in the second half's eight races he finished in the points only once, ending the season 14th in the standings, with 59 points.

=== Return to 125cc ===
==== Squadra Corse Metis Gilera (2006) ====
Corsi returned to the 125cc class for 2006 with Gilera, but he fell short of an impressive season, two fourth places were the best results of his year, and he finished 12th in the championship, with 79 points.

==== Skilled Racing Team (2007) ====
In 2007, Corsi won his first Grand Prix race at the Turkish Grand Prix in Istanbul, and finished third in Mugello. Corsi ended the season sixth in the standings, with 168 points, both being career high totals so far.

==== Jack & Jones WRB (2008) ====
For 2008, Corsi received a factory spec Aprilia RSA 125 and he was seen as a title favourite for the year. Corsi won races in Jerez, Estoril, Mugello, and the season closer in Valencia, and also finished third in Assen, Rimini, and Sepang, but ultimately finished second in the championship with 225 points, 39 points behind the Derbi of Mike Di Meglio, who also won four races himself, winning the title.

==== Fontana Racing (2009) ====
For 2009, it had been speculated that Corsi would ride for the Scot Honda team in 250cc's, but he continued in 125cc with Aprilia, in one last hope of winning the World Championship. It was a down year for him, finishing on the podium only twice (a second place in Donnington, and a third place in Indianapolis), and concluded his career's final year of the 125cc category with only 81 points, good for 11th in the rider's standings.

=== Moto2 World Championship ===
==== Team JiR (2010) ====
In 2010, Corsi stepped up to the new intermediate class, Moto2, for Team JiR. He scored his first podium, and his team's first podium in the intermediate class, with a third place at Le Mans, moving into third place in the championship standings temporarily. He added another third placed podium at Mugello, but a crash at both Silverstone and the Sachsenring put a dent his championship hopes. He finished the season well, with regular top-ten finishes, ending his second season in the intermediate class (following the debut 2005 season) fifth in the rider's championship, with 138 points.

==== IodaRacing Project (2011–2012) ====
In 2011, Corsi now riding for IodaRacing Project, he basically replicated his 2010 season, scoring two third place finishes (this time in Jerez, and Aragón), and finishing sixth in the final standings, with 127 points.

For the 2012 season, Corsi stayed with the IodaRacing Project team, and regressed, not scoring any podiums during the year, his highest finish being three fifth places in Barcelona, Silverstone and Brno, ending the year a disappointing 11th in the standings, with 88 points.

==== Forward Racing (2013–2015) ====
Switching teams again, Corsi would ride for Forward Racing in the 2013 Moto2 World Championship, and have his usual season, riding mostly in the middle of the pack, a regular points finisher, occasional top-ten finishes, and one podium, this time coming as a second place in Germany. He finished the year 11th in the rider's championship, with 108 points.

Staying with Forward Racing, Corsi was partnered by Mattia Pasini for the 2014 season, and had a very half and half year. He started the season off well, with three straight fifth place finishes in Qatar, Texas, and Argentina, before a retirement in Jerez. This was followed by a second place in Le Mans, a fourth place in Mugello, and another retirement in Barcelona. A third place in Germany was followed up by a fifth place in Indianapolis, a 12th place in Brno, and a retirement in Silverstone, where he broke his left arm. Corsi underwent a four hour operation at the John Radcliffe Hospital in Oxford to fix the open and displaced fracture of the ulna of his left arm, reducing and fixing the fracture with a plaque and screws. During the surgery, the doctors discovered injuries to the extensor tendons of the wrist, that were also repaired. These severe injuries saw Corsi miss the remaining six races of the season rehabbing, prematurely ending his 2014 season. He still managed to finish the year seventh in the standings, with 100 points.

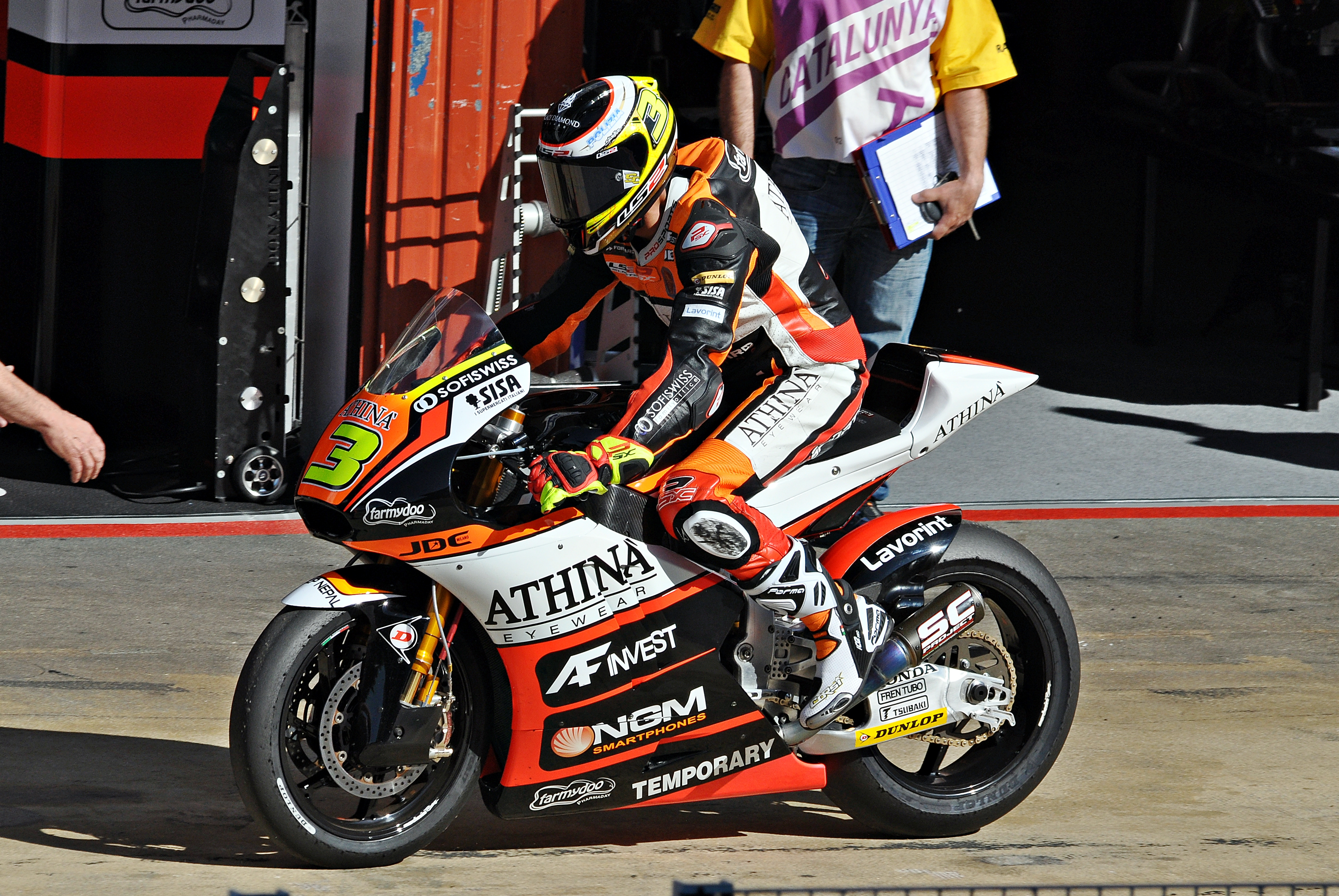
Corsi in 2015.

For the 2015 Moto2 World Championship, Corsi's teammate at Forward Racing was Lorenzo Baldassarri. He started the season off poorly, being involved in a crash with Esteve Rabat in the season opener in Qatar, causing both riders to retire from the race. In Mugello, he was involved in a collision with Sam Lowes, in which Corsi turned in on Lowes, causing himself to crash, Lowes managing to go on, eventually finishing fourth. Altogether, Corsi had an average year, scoring no podiums, his season's best results were two fourth places in Germany and San Marino, and finished 12th overall in the rider's championship, with 86 points.

==== Speed Up Racing (2016–2017) ====
In 2016, Corsi joined Speed Up to replace Sam Lowes, who left to Gresini Racing. Corsi had his usual year, starting the season off really well, scoring a third place in the season opener at Qatar, and a second place in Le Mans, the fifth race of the season. In Austin, with five laps remaining, he tried overtaking Takaaki Nakagami in the first corner, going up the inside of the Japanese rider when there was no room, causing Nakagami to crash. He was placed under investigation by race direction, but it was subsequently deemed a racing incident. In Barcelona, he was investigated after making contact with Lorenzo Baldassari in a chicane, but it too was deemed a racing incident. He had a similar incident with Nakagami in Brno that year as in Austin, but this time Corsi receiving a ride-through penalty for dangerous riding. He would score points regularly during the rest of the year, but had no further podiums, finishing tenth in the standings, with 103 points.

Staying with Speed Up for the 2017 season, Corsi would continue his bad habit of being involved in crashes, this time in Jerez, where he was involved in his third collision with Nakagami and his first with Xavi Vierge. Corsi tried to overtake too many riders into turn one, lost the front, and took out all three of them from the race. Overall he had another average year, finishing with no podiums, a season's best of fourth in Germany, 117 points, and ninth in the championship.

==== Tasca Racing Scuderia Moto2 (2018–2019) ====
Corsi switched to team Tasca Racing for the 2018 season, partnering Federico Fuligni. Corsi had a weaker year, seeing the checkered flag in the top-ten only four times, and finished 14th in the rider's championship with 53 points.

In 2019, Corsi had his Grand Prix career's worst year, finishing in the points only twice in the first nine races of the season, an eighth place in Austin and a 14th place in Barcelona. His poor performances led to Tasca Racing replacing him with ex-teammate Mattia Pasini from the Brno round onwards, after the summer break. Corsi thus finished with only ten points, 24th in the rider's championship.

==== MV Agusta Forward Racing (2020–2022) ====
Corsi made his return to MV Agusta Forward Racing for the 2020 season, partnering Stefano Manzi, and continued declining in his performances. He finished in the points only six times, and only finished in the top-ten once, a tenth place finish in Aragon. He ended the year 24th in the championship again, this time with 15 points.

Partnered by Lorenzo Baldassarri at Forward for the 2021 Moto2 World Championship, Corsi started the year off in the worst way possible, a high-side in the opening round of Qatar, resulting in a compound fracture in his left wrist. He was replaced for the second round by Tommaso Marcon, and for the third by Miquel Pons, with rumours starting to circle whether or not it was going to be his last year. He finished ninth in Le Mans, tenth in Aragon, and 13th in Austin, and the following weekend in Misano saw Corsi start his 300th career race, becoming only the fifth rider after Loris Capirossi, Valentino Rossi, Andrea Dovizioso, and Thomas Lüthi to achieve this feat. The final round in Valencia saw him take an unexpected pole position in qualifying, his first pole in nearly nine years, but on the warm-up lap Corsi's bike stalled, and he entered the pits in tears, unable to start the race from the front of the grid due to a technical issue. He ended the season 24th in the standings with 16 points, and was extended for another year by Forward Racing for his brilliant pole position.

In what was due to be Corsi's 20th and final season in Grand Prix racing, Corsi would be joined by teammate Marcos Ramírez at Forward Racing for the 2022 Moto2 season. The year was a major disappointment, with Corsi failing to score a point and he and Ramirez were never really looking competitive because of a bike with not many upgrades and tensions between Forward Racing and MV Agusta (now being bought by KTM) with Corsi being replaced by Álex Escrig, ending his long career in Grand Prix racing.

==== Later years ====
It was later announced that Corsi would be retained by MV Agusta as a coach and test rider, with the possibility of doing some wild card rides both on the European and the World championships. He also tried to join the World Supersport paddock (by also winning two races out of the two he raced in the Italian championship), but he could not find a ride for 2023.

In 2024, Corsi ended up racing in World Supersport before finishing the season as a wildcard for his former MV Agusta team (now named Forward Racing) in Moto2, finishing the race 27th and last. After the season, he was announced as the new team director.

== Career statistics ==
=== Career highlights ===
- 2023: 1st, CIV Supersport Championship

=== CIV 125cc Championship ===
==== Races by year ====
(key) (Races in bold indicate pole position; races in italics indicate fastest lap)

Year	Bike	1	2	3	4	5	Pos	Pts
2001	Honda	MIS1	MON	VAL	MIS2	MIS3; 10	22nd	6

=== CIV Championship (Campionato Italiano Velocita) ===
==== Races by year ====
(key) (Races in bold indicate pole position; races in italics indicate fastest lap)

Year	Class	Bike	1	2	3	4	5	Pos	Pts
2002	125cc	Honda	IMO; 6	VAL; 3	MUG; 10	MIS1; 3	MIS2; 6	3rd	52 (58)

=== Grand Prix motorcycle racing ===
==== By season ====
Season	Class	Motorcycle	Type	Team	Race	Win	Podium	Pole	FLap	Pts	Plcd
2002	125cc	Honda	Honda RS125R	Polini	1	0	0	0	0	0	NC
2003	125cc	Honda	Honda RS125R	Team Scot	14	0	0	0	0	32	19th
2004	125cc	Honda	Honda RS125R	Kopron Team Scot	16	0	1	0	0	61	13th
2005	250cc	Aprilia	Aprilia RSV 250	MS Aprilia Italia Corse	16	0	0	0	0	59	14th
2006	125cc	Gilera	Gilera RS 125	Squadra Corse Metis Gilera	14	0	0	0	0	79	12th
2007	125cc	Aprilia	Aprilia RS 125	Skilled Racing Team	17	1	2	0	0	168	6th
2008	125cc	Aprilia	Aprilia RSA 125	Jack & Jones WRB	17	4	7	3	2	225	**2nd**
2009	125cc	Aprilia	Aprilia RSA 125	Fontana Racing	16	0	2	0	0	81	11th
2010	Moto2	Motobi	TSR TSR6	JiR Moto2	17	0	2	0	0	138	5th
2011	Moto2	FTR	FTR Moto M211	IodaRacing Project	17	0	2	0	0	127	6th
2012	Moto2	FTR	FTR Moto M212	Came IodaRacing Project	17	0	0	1	0	88	11th
2013	Moto2	Speed Up	Speed Up SF13	NGM Mobile Racing	17	0	1	0	0	108	11th
2014	Moto2	Forward KLX	Forward KLX	NGM Forward Racing	12	0	2	0	0	100	7th
2014	Moto2	Kalex	Kalex Moto2	NGM Forward Racing	12	0	2	0	0	100	7th
2015	Moto2	Kalex	Kalex Moto2 2014	Athinà Forward Racing	17	0	0	0	0	86	12th
2016	Moto2	Speed Up	Speed Up SF16	Speed Up Racing	18	0	2	0	0	103	10th
2017	Moto2	Speed Up	Speed Up SF17	Speed Up Racing	18	0	0	0	0	117	9th
2018	Moto2	Kalex	Kalex Moto2	Tasca Racing Scuderia Moto2	18	0	0	0	0	53	14th
2019	Moto2	Kalex	Kalex Moto2	Tasca Racing Scuderia Moto2	9	0	0	0	0	10	24th
2019	Moto2	NTS	NTS NH7	NTS RW Racing GP	2	0	0	0	0	10	24th
2020	Moto2	MV Agusta	MV Agusta F2	MV Agusta Temporary Forward	14	0	0	0	0	15	24th
2021	Moto2	MV Agusta	MV Agusta F2	MV Agusta Forward Racing	14	0	0	1	0	16	24th
2022	Moto2	MV Agusta	MV Agusta F2	MV Agusta Forward Racing	19	0	0	0	0	0	35th
2024	Moto2	Forward	Forward F2	Klint Forward Factory Team	1	0	0	0	0	0	40th
Total					**321**	**5**	**21**	**5**	**2**	**1666**	

==== By class ====
Class	Seasons	1st GP	1st Pod	1st Win	Race	Win	Podiums	Pole	FLap	Pts	WChmp
125cc	2002–2004, 2006–2009	2002 Italy	2004 Japan	2007 Turkey	95	5	12	3	2	646	0
250cc	2005	2005 Spain			16	0	0	0	0	59	0
Moto2	2010–2022, 2024	2010 Qatar	2010 France		210	0	9	2	0	961	0
Total	2002–2022, 2024				**321**	**5**	**21**	**5**	**2**	**1666**	**0**

==== Races by year ====
(key) (Races in bold indicate pole position, races in italics indicate fastest lap of the race)

Year	Class	Bike	1	2	3	4	5	6	7	8	9	10	11	12	13	14	15	16	17	18	19	20	Pos	Pts
2002	125cc	Honda	JPN	RSA	SPA	FRA	ITA; 22	CAT	NED	GBR	GER	CZE	POR	RIO	PAC	MAL	AUS	VAL					NC	0
2003	125cc	Honda	JPN; 12	RSA; 14	SPA; 21	FRA; 14	ITA; 12	CAT; 15	NED; 12	GBR; Ret	GER; 9	CZE; Ret	POR; 9	RIO; 22	PAC; 15	MAL	AUS	VAL; Ret					19th	32
2004	125cc	Honda	RSA; 14	SPA; 12	FRA; 15	ITA; 11	CAT; Ret	NED; 18	RIO; 13	GER; 12	GBR; 5	CZE; 9	POR; Ret	JPN; 3	QAT; Ret	MAL; Ret	AUS; 16	VAL; 8					13th	61
2005	250cc	Aprilia	SPA; 9	POR; 17	CHN; 8	FRA; 11	ITA; 9	CAT; 5	NED; 10	GBR; 6	GER; Ret	CZE; Ret	JPN; 11	MAL; Ret	QAT; 17	AUS; 16	TUR; Ret	VAL; Ret					14th	59
2006	125cc	Gilera	SPA; 11	QAT; 9	TUR; 4	CHN; 10	FRA; 10	ITA; 10	CAT; Ret	NED; 4	GBR; 13	GER; 5	CZE; 15	MAL; 15	AUS; DNS	JPN; DNQ	POR; 9	VAL; 19					12th	79
2007	125cc	Aprilia	QAT; 5	SPA; Ret	TUR; 1	CHN; 5	FRA; 8	ITA; 3	CAT; 7	GBR; 10	NED; 5	GER; 4	CZE; 7	RSM; Ret	POR; 4	JPN; 6	AUS; 4	MAL; 7	VAL; 12				7th	168
2008	125cc	Aprilia	QAT; 7	SPA; 1	**POR**; 1	CHN; Ret	FRA; 13	ITA; 1	CAT; 5	**GBR**; 5	**NED**; 3	GER; 5	CZE; 10	RSM; 3	IND; 7	JPN; 7	AUS; 8	MAL; 3	VAL; 1				**2nd**	**225**
2009	125cc	Aprilia	QAT; 14	JPN; 15	SPA; 14	FRA; Ret	ITA; 18	CAT; 16	NED; 8	GER; Ret	GBR; 2	CZE; Ret	IND; 3	RSM; 7	POR; Ret	AUS; 5	MAL; Ret	VAL; 4					11th	81
2010	Moto2	Motobi	QAT; 8	SPA; 5	FRA; 3	ITA; 3	GBR; Ret	NED; 12	CAT; 6	GER; Ret	CZE; 8	IND; 5	RSM; 4	ARA; 5	JPN; 11	MAL; 10	AUS; 8	POR; 14	VAL; 7				5th	138
2011	Moto2	FTR	QAT; 6	SPA; 3	POR; 5	FRA; 7	CAT; 4	GBR; 10	NED; 14	ITA; 7	GER; 8	CZE; 9	IND; 14	RSM; 10	ARA; 3	JPN; 5	AUS; 15	MAL; Ret	VAL; Ret				6th	127
2012	Moto2	FTR	QAT; 8	SPA; 17	POR; Ret	FRA; Ret	CAT; 5	GBR; 5	NED; Ret	GER; 6	ITA; 18	IND; 8	CZE; 5	RSM; Ret	**ARA**; 7	JPN; 6	MAL; 22	AUS; 6	VAL; 17				11th	88
2013	Moto2	Speed Up	QAT; 7	AME; 15	SPA; 13	FRA; 11	ITA; 7	CAT; 10	NED; Ret	GER; 2	IND; 6	CZE; 9	GBR; 9	RSM; Ret	ARA; Ret	MAL; 11	AUS; 4	JPN; Ret	VAL; 4				11th	108
2014	Moto2	Forward KLX	QAT; 5	AME; 5	ARG; 5	SPA; Ret																	7th	100
2014	Moto2	Kalex					FRA; 2	ITA; 4	CAT; Ret	NED; 13	GER; 3	IND; 5	CZE; 12	GBR; Ret	RSM	ARA	JPN	AUS	MAL	VAL			7th	100
2015	Moto2	Kalex	QAT; Ret	AME; 11	ARG; Ret	SPA; 8	FRA; 18	ITA; Ret	CAT; 13	NED; 10	GER; 4	IND	CZE; 11	GBR; Ret	RSM; 4	ARA; 9	JPN; 7	AUS; 13	MAL; 9	VAL; 9			12th	86
2016	Moto2	Speed Up	QAT; 3	ARG; 20	AME; 6	SPA; Ret	FRA; 2	ITA; 12	CAT; Ret	NED; 7	GER; Ret	AUT; Ret	CZE; 19	GBR; 8	RSM; Ret	ARA; 9	JPN; 6	AUS; 7	MAL; 11	VAL; 11			10th	103
2017	Moto2	Speed Up	QAT; 17	ARG; 6	AME; 7	SPA; Ret	FRA; 8	ITA; 8	CAT; 11	NED; Ret	GER; 4	CZE; 6	AUT; 11	GBR; 6	RSM; 7	ARA; 7	JPN; Ret	AUS; 7	MAL; 11	VAL; 9			9th	117
2018	Moto2	Kalex	QAT; 14	ARG; 23	AME; 12	SPA; 12	FRA; 14	ITA; 10	CAT; 12	NED; 15	GER; 8	CZE; 15	AUT; Ret	GBR; C	RSM; 11	ARA; 12	THA; 10	JPN; Ret	AUS; 19	MAL; 16	VAL; 10		14th	53
2019	Moto2	Kalex	QAT; 19	ARG; Ret	AME; 8	SPA; Ret	FRA; Ret	ITA; Ret	CAT; 14	NED; Ret	GER; 21	CZE	AUT	GBR									24th	10
2019	Moto2	NTS													RSM; 19	ARA; 21	THA	JPN	AUS	MAL	VAL		24th	10
2020	Moto2	MV Agusta	QAT; 21	SPA; 15	ANC; Ret	CZE; DNS	AUT; 20	STY; 20	RSM; 14	EMI; 12	CAT; 15	FRA; 16	ARA; 10	TER; 15	EUR; Ret	VAL; 17	POR; Ret						24th	15
2021	Moto2	MV Agusta	QAT; DNS	DOH	POR	SPA; Ret	FRA; 9	ITA; Ret	CAT; 16	GER; Ret	NED; 21	STY; 25	AUT; 19	GBR; 22	ARA; 10	RSM; Ret	AME; 13	EMI; 19	ALR; 17	**VAL**; DNS			24th	16
2022	Moto2	MV Agusta	QAT; 18	INA; Ret	ARG; 17	AME; Ret	POR; Ret	SPA; 18	FRA; 16	ITA; Ret	CAT; 22	GER; Ret	NED; 20	GBR; 20	AUT; 20	RSM; Ret	ARA; 19	JPN; Ret	THA; 24	AUS; Ret	MAL	VAL; Ret	35th	0
2024	Moto2	Forward	QAT	POR	AME	SPA	FRA	CAT	ITA	NED	GER	GBR	AUT	ARA	RSM	EMI	INA	JPN	AUS	THA	MAL	SLD; 26	40th	0

=== CIV National Superbike ===
==== Races by year ====
(key) (Races in bold indicate pole position; races in italics indicate fastest lap)

Year	Bike	1		2		3		4		5		6		Pos	Pts
Year	Bike	R1	R2	R1	R2	R1	R2	R1	R2	R1	R2	R1	R2	Pos	Pts
2022	Yamaha	MIS	MIS	VAL	VAL	MUG	MUG	MIS2; 6	MIS2; 4	MUG2	MUG2	IMO	IMO	21st	23

=== Supersport World Championship ===
==== By season ====
Season	Class	Motorcycle	Team	Number	Race	Win	Podium	Pole	FLap	Pts	Plcd
2023	WSSP	Yamaha YZF-R6	Altogo Racing Team	40	6	0	0	0	0	33	20th
2024	WSSP	Ducati Panigale V2	Renzi Corse	40	22	0	0	0	0	60	15th
Total					**28**	**0**	**0**	**0**	**0**	**93**	

==== Races by year ====
(key) (Races in bold indicate pole position, races in italics indicate fastest lap)

Year	Bike	1		2		3		4		5		6		7		8		9		10		11		12		Pos	Pts
Year	Bike	R1	R2	R1	R2	R1	R2	R1	R2	R1	R2	R1	R2	R1	R2	R1	R2	R1	R2	R1	R2	R1	R2	R1	R2	Pos	Pts
2023	Yamaha	AUS	AUS	INA	INA	NED; 16	NED; 13	SPA	SPA	EMI; 6	EMI; 6	GBR	GBR	ITA	ITA	CZE	CZE	FRA	FRA	SPA	SPA	POR	POR	SPA; 12	SPA; 10	20th	33
2024	Ducati	AUS	AUS	SPA; 20	SPA; 19	NED; 14	NED; 13	ITA; Ret	ITA; 11	GBR; 13	GBR; 13	CZE; Ret	CZE; 11	POR; 13	POR; 11	FRA; 24	FRA; 18	ITA; Ret	ITA; 12	SPA; 16	SPA; 13	POR; 7	POR; 11	SPA; 12	SPA; 10	15th	60
