= FIM Women's European Championship =

- FIM Women's European Championship logo
- Category: Motorcycle racing
- Region: Europe
- Inaugural season: 2020
- Constructors: Yamaha
- Tyre suppliers: Pirelli
- Riders' champion: (Spain) Rosa Jiménez
- Teams' champion: Team Trasimeno

The FIM Women's European Championship, formerly known as the SSP 300 Women’s European Championship and prior to 2023 the Women's European Cup, is a road racing motorcycle series for female riders. Organised by EMG Eventi and Moto X Racing it is sanctioned by FIM Europe and the Federazione Motociclistica Italiana (Italian Motorcycling Federation). Since 2026 it is the official feeder series for the FIM Women's Circuit Racing World Championship and competitors ride the same Yamaha R7 motorcycles that are used in the WorldWCR.

== History ==
The series was the brainchild of Sandro Carusi of Moto X racing, who had previously worked with Italian champion Letizia Marchetti to form Lety X Racing which ran summer and winter schools to hone motorcycle racing skills for female riders. Carusi and Marchetti had also collaborated to run an all female team in the Campionato Italiano Velocità (Italian Speed Championship) in 2019.

The concept of an all female series using Supersport 300 motorcycles was put to the FIM who approved the series as the Women's European Cup. Although a European competition, the inaugural 2020 season was planned to be run in Italy as a support race for the CIV. Six races were planned, running from April to October. COVID-19 delayed the start of the season and caused a revised calendar to be introduced. 5 races were run between July and October with Beatriz Neila winning the cup.

In 2021 a round outside Italy was introduced at the Automotodrom Grobnik in Croatia. The Cup was again won by Neila.

A round in Valencia, Spain was included in 2022. Neila won the Cup for the third time.

In 2023 the series was upgraded to full championship status, the Women's European Championship, with rounds in Valencia, Spain, Brno and Most in the Czech Republic and Misano, Mugello and Imola in Italy. Neila again took the cup.

Rounds at Grobnik and Brno were held as well as the Italian rounds in 2024. 2023 champion Neila did not compete in 2024, instead entering the inaugural FIM Women's Circuit Racing World Championship. Natalia Rivera won the championship.

In 2025 rounds were held at the Pannónia-Ring, Hungary and Grobnik, Croatia alongside the Alpe Adria Championship. Italian rounds at Misano and Umbria were held alongside the CIV. Rosa Jiménez won the Championship.

The 2026 calendar was announced in December 2025 with a pre-season test at Misano in April and rounds at Misano and Vallelunga in Italy, Pannónia-Ring in Hungary, Brno in the Czech Republic and the season finale at Mugello.

=== Roadway to FIM Women’s Circuit Racing World Championship ===
In December 2025 the FIM, in conjunction with the FMI, Dorna and EMG Eventi, announced a new initiative the Roadway to FIM Women’s Circuit Racing World Championship which was initiated to help female riders reach the international stage in motorcycle road racing.

The initiative gives a structured progression starting in the CIV Femminile (Women’s Italian Championship), then to the Women's European Championship and finally participation in the WorldWCR. In support of this progression, both the Italian and European women's championships will use the same Yamaha R7 bikes as used in the WorldWCR rather than the SSP 300 machines previously used.

The winner of the CIV Femminile will receive a prize fund of 10,000€ from the FMI to help further her career.

The winner of the 2026 WEC will be guaranteed a spot on the 2027 WorldWCR grid and also receive a scholarship from Gruppo Minerva designed to facilitate her growth path and support her transition to the WorldWCR.

== Results ==
Year	Champion	Runner-up	3rd Place	Refs
2020	(Spain) Beatriz Neila	(Italy) Sabrina Della Manna	(Italy) Roberta Ponziani	
2021	(Spain) Beatriz Neila	(Spain) Sara Sánchez	(Italy) Roberta Ponziani	
2022	(Spain) Beatriz Neila	(Spain) Sara Sánchez	(Italy) Roberta Ponziani	
2023	(Spain) Beatriz Neila	(Spain) Natalia Rivera	(Italy) Roberta Ponziani	
2024	(Spain) Natalia Rivera	(Poland) Patrycja Sowa	(Italy) Josephine Bruno	
2025	(Spain) Rosa Jiménez	(Poland) Patrycja Sowa	(Italy) Arianna Barale	
