= ESkootr Championship =

Electric scooter racing championship

eSkootr Championship
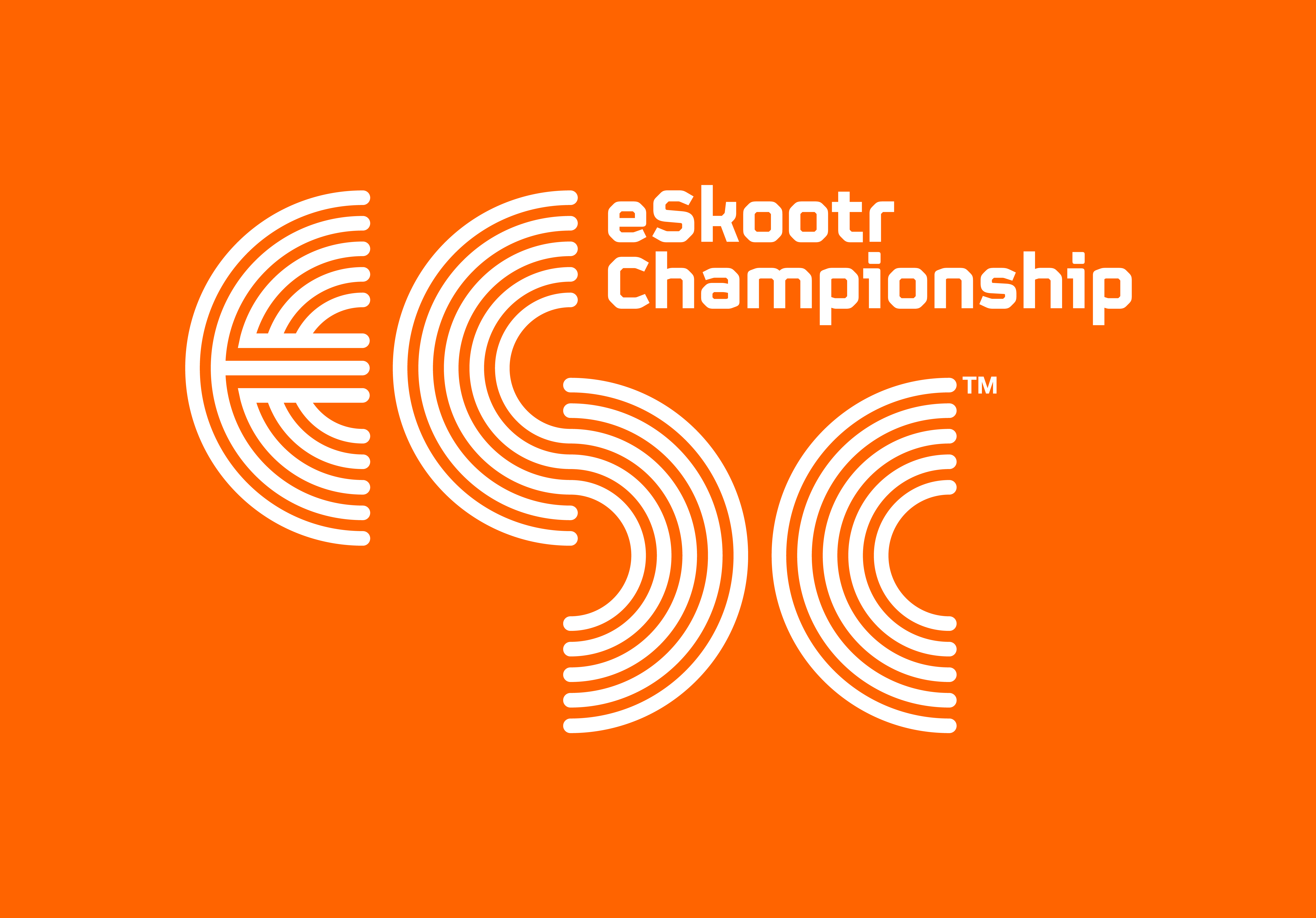
- Country: International
- Inaugural season: 2022
- Riders: 30
- Teams: 10
- Tyre suppliers: PMT
- Official website: www.esc.live

eSkootr Championship (eSC) is an electric scooter racing series which launched its first season in 2022. Races take place in several city centre locations across the world. The series was conceived by motorsport entrepreneur Hrag Sarkissian and former racing driver Khalil Beshir. Lucas Di Grassi served as sustainability ambassador, while Alexander Wurz had the role of safety ambassador. Swiss rider Matis Neyroud won the first race. The series has been announced to return for a second season in 2024/25.

== S1-X eSkootr ==
Developed especially for the series with help from Italian motorsports engineering and lightweight composites company Ycom, the S1-X eSkootr, which all riders race with, is able to reach speeds of more than 100 km/h with a lean of greater than 50 degrees. They include twin 6 kW motors and a battery developed by Williams Advanced Engineering with a capacity of 1.33kWh. Total weight of 35 kilograms, hydraulic brakes, 6.5 inch wheels, carbon fibre chassis, fairings and bodywork are Bcomp flax fibre composite.

== Calendar ==
For eSC's inaugural season, six rounds were originally announced, with the first in London in May 2022. The championship was scheduled to remain in Europe before finishing in the United States in October.

Before the third planned race in Italy, the remaining races were postponed before it was announced that the season would conclude with a double-header event at Circuit Paul Ricard near Marseille, moving the competition to a purpose-built racing circuit for the first time.

The London race was staged at multi-purpose venue Printworks London in the east of the city.

The riders' championship was won by Aymard Vernay while Nico Roche Racing won the teams' championship.

Round	Country	City	Date	1st	2nd	3rd
1	United Kingdom	London	13–14 May 2022	Matis Neyround	Daniel Brooks	Anish Shetty
2	Switzerland	Sion	27–28 May 2022	Sara Cabrini	Aymard Vernay	Marc Luna
3	France	Marseille	9 November 2022	Marc Luna	Roberta Ponziani	Kilian Larher
4	France	Marseille	10 November 2022	Sara Cabrini	Roberta Ponziani	Aymard Vernay

The following rounds were planned, but subsequently cancelled:

Country	Date
Italy	15–16 July 2022
Spain	16–17 September 2022
United States	14–15 October 2022

== Teams and riders ==
Riders for the series were professional athletes from a range of sporting backgrounds, including existing racing disciplines within motorsports and BMX as well as freestyle scooters plus ones as varied as figure skating (Jordan Rand) and snowboarding (Billy Morgan). They were a part of the eSC Draft. Similar to the NFL style draft in America, these riders were selected in rotation by the teams.

The confirmed teams were Carlin, Helbiz, Nico Roche Racing Team, Murphy Prototypes, SICK! Series Racing (owned by Fabio Wibmer), 27X by Nico Hulkenberg and 258 Racing (owned by Anthony Joshua).

Team	No.	Rider	Rounds
(Germany) 27X by Nico Hulkenberg	14	Maria Bellot Bernabe	1
(Germany) 27X by Nico Hulkenberg	41	Antonin Bernard	1
(Germany) 27X by Nico Hulkenberg	360	Billy Morgan	1
(United Kingdom) 258 Racing	78	Tre Whyte	1
(United Kingdom) 258 Racing	96	Roberta Ponziani	1
(United Kingdom) 258 Racing	99	Wilfred Njuguna	1
(United Kingdom) Carlin	22	Nicci Daly	1
(United Kingdom) Carlin	44	Anish Shetty	1
(United Kingdom) Carlin	66	Danny Skinner	1
(Italy) Helbiz	11	Sara Cabrini	1
(Italy) Helbiz	23	Jordan Rand	1
(Italy) Helbiz	33	Jamiel Guerchadi	1
(Spain) Los Rayos	46	Maria Paula Mapis	1
(Spain) Los Rayos	64	Sara Sanchez Tamayo	1
(Spain) Los Rayos	69	Aaron Guardado	1
(Republic of Ireland) Murphy Scooters	7	Marc Luna	1
(Republic of Ireland) Murphy Scooters	8	Roomet Saalik	1
(Republic of Ireland) Murphy Scooters	444	Dakota Schuetz	1
	10	Aymard Vernay	1
	35	Lena Kemmer	1
	71	Ami Houde	1
(Austria) SICK! Series Racing	9	Javi Espinosa	1
(Austria) SICK! Series Racing	27	Alexis Letellier	1
(Austria) SICK! Series Racing	85	Nancy van de Ven	1
