= Forward Racing =

Motorcycle racing team

- 2026 name: Moto2: Klint Racing Team; WorldWCR: Klint Forward Factory Team
- Base: Agno, Switzerland
- Principal: Giovanni Cuzari
- Rider(s): Moto2: 11. Álex Escrig; 85. Xabi Zurutuza; WorldWCR: 58. Paola Ramos; 96. Roberta Ponziani
- Motorcycle: Moto2: Forward F2; WorldWCR: Yamaha YZF-R7
- Tyres: Moto2: Pirelli; WorldWCR: Pirelli
- Riders' Championships: WorldWCR: 2025: María Herrera

Forward Racing is a motorcycle racing team competing in the Moto2 World Championship and WorldWCR.

== History ==
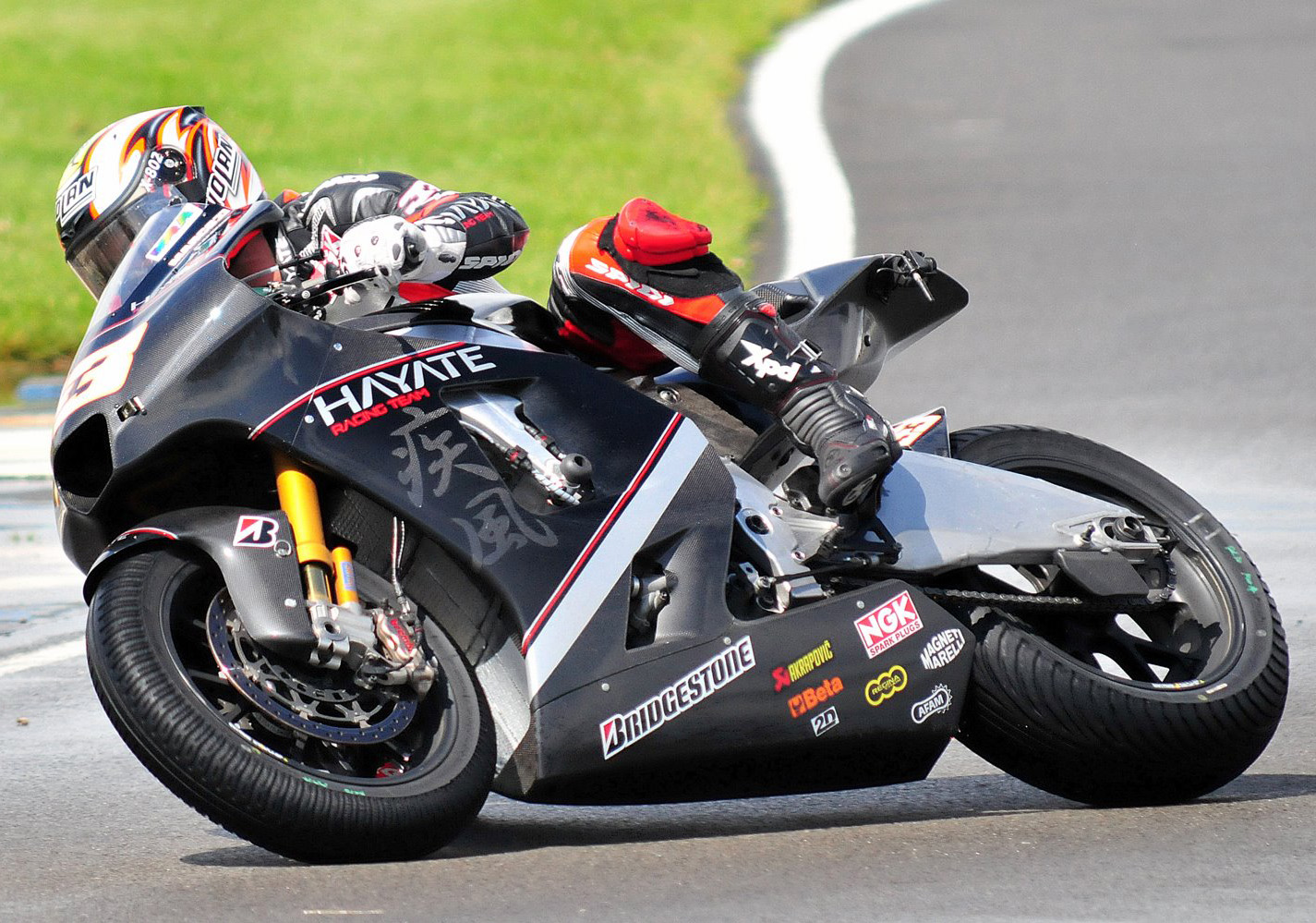
Melandri at Donington in 2009

The team started competing in the MotoGP class as the Hayate Racing Team, a scaled down version of the Kawasaki factory team that withdrew from MotoGP for the 2009 championship due to the Great Recession. The team took its name from the Japanese word Hayate meaning hurricane. The team ran one Kawasaki ZX-RR motorcycle that was ridden by Marco Melandri.

Kawasaki stopped developing new parts for the motorbike in March 2009, meaning Kawasaki's involvement was limited to servicing and maintaining the motorcycle for the rest of the 2009 season. Despite this, Melandri achieved a remarkable result in coming second at the French Grand Prix at Le Mans in May.

In 2010, they participated as Forward Racing in the new Moto2 class, with Jules Cluzel and Claudio Corti as their riders on Suter bikes. Cluzel won the British Grand Prix and finished 7th in the championship. Corti had a pole position for the same race, but his best result was ninth at Misano. In 2011 the team competed with Cluzel and Alex Baldolini, later replaced by Raffaele De Rosa. The best result was a fourth place clinched by Cluzel at the British Grand Prix.

The team returned to MotoGP in 2012 as one of the Claiming Rule Teams and signed Colin Edwards, fielding a Suter chassis with a BMW engine.

For the 2012 Moto2 Championship Forward Racing signed Alex de Angelis and Yuki Takahashi. The team started the season with Suter bikes then switched to FTR after six rounds; with the new chassis de Angelis won the Malaysian Grand Prix.

For 2013, Forward Racing expanded its MotoGP involvement to a two-rider team, signing Claudio Corti alongside Colin Edwards with new FTR-Kawasaki bikes. The Moto2 effort was expanded to four riders with Simone Corsi, Mattia Pasini, Alex de Angelis and Ricard Cardús aboard Speed Up bikes.

In 2014 the team again entered the MotoGP class with two bikes for Colin Edwards and Aleix Espargaró. Taking advantage of the new Open category, Forward Racing intended to use Yamaha-leased YZR-M1 engines with FTR frames, however the team started the season with a complete Yamaha YZR-M1 engine-frame-swingarm package with other parts supplied by FTR. At the Mugello round Edwards debuted the new Forward frame built by Harris Performance. Espargaró, who stayed with the Yamaha frame, achieved a pole position at Assen and finished on the podium at Aragon with second place, finishing seventh in the championship.

In Moto2 Forward Racing stepped back to a two-rider team, retaining Pasini and Corsi. The team started the season with 2013-specification Kalex frames modified in-house and rebadged as Forward KLX. At the fifth round the team switched to official Kalex bikes. Riding the new frame Corsi scored two podiums, but a crash at Silverstone ended his season. He was then replaced by Supersport World Championship rider Florian Marino.

For the 2015 season, Forward Racing renewed their partnership with Yamaha, planning to run two bikes with YZR-M1 engine-frame-swingarm packages and abandoning the in-house chassis project. New riders were Stefan Bradl and Loris Baz. Forward also renewed its commitment to the Moto2 class fielding two Kalex frames for Simone Corsi, returning from his injury, and new teammate Lorenzo Baldassarri.

Shortly after the German round, littles problems afflict the team that than announced that they had released Stefan Bradl from his contract at his request. The team returned on track at Brno in both the MotoGP and Moto2 classes with Bradl being replaced by Claudio Corti alongside Baz, Corsi and Baldassarri.

In 2016, the team left MotoGP, but remained in the Moto2 class. On 11 September 2016, at the San Marino Grand Prix, Lorenzo Baldassarri achieved his first victory, which was the third victory ever for the team in the World Championship. In 2017, the team continued in Moto2, with the same pair of riders as the previous season. In 2018, the team used Suter motorcycles entrusted to the Italian Stefano Manzi and the Brazilian Eric Granado without obtaining significant results. In 2019, Forward began a collaboration with MV Agusta to bring their F2 to the track. The riders were the Swiss rider Dominique Aegerter and Manzi. The season ended in eleventh place in the Moto2 team championship, obtaining their best performances in the Dutch TT and the Valencian Community Grand Prix.

In 2020, Forward continues its collaboration with MV Agusta. The riders who were entrusted with F2 are Manzi and Simone Corsi. The season ends in third place in the team standings, while Manzi obtains the first pole position of his career in the Valencian Community. For 2021, Lorenzo Baldassarri is hired alongside Corsi. The season, in which both owners are forced to miss races and are replaced, ends in fourteenth place in the team standings with another pole, again in Valencia by Corsi. In 2022, Corsi begins his third consecutive year with the team, the other rider is Marcos Ramírez. The season turns out to be below expectations with five points scored by Ramírez. Corsi, having ridden in over three hundred Grand Prix in his career, retires.

In January 2023 the end of the collaboration with MV Agusta was announced. The team originally planned to use a Kalex prototype that was branded as Forward, but chose to retain the MV Agusta chassis and rebranding it as Forward instead. The regular riders were Ramírez and Álex Escrig. The first point of the season came on at the Indian Grand Prix with the replacement rider Sean Dylan Kelly. The season ended in third, and last, place in the constructors championship with only 4 points.

In 2024 the team made its debut in MotoE and the inaugural WorldWCR season. In Moto2, Escrig is joined by Xavier Artigas, who was making his debut in the category. The team also moved away from the MV Agusta-based machine from 2023 to form their own chassis, marking the team's return as a chassis manufacturer. In MotoE, the team announced Andrea Mantovani and María Herrera as official riders. Herrera was also entered by the team into the WorldWCR season where she finished second overall in the championship.

The team announced they were to increase their participation in WorldWCR in 2025 by running two bikes and signed Roberta Ponziani to ride the second bike.

== Results ==
Year	Class	Team name	Motorcycle	No.	Riders	Races	Wins	Podiums	Poles	F. laps	Points	Pos.
2009	MotoGP	Hayate Racing Team	Kawasaki Ninja ZX-RR	33	(Italy) Marco Melandri	17	0	1	0	0	108	10th
2010	Moto2	Forward Racing	Suter MMX	16	(France) Jules Cluzel	17	1	2	0	1	106	7th
2010	Moto2	Forward Racing	Suter MMX	71	(Italy) Claudio Corti	17	0	0	1	0	20	25th
2010	Moto2	Forward Racing	Suter MMX	70	(Italy) Ferruccio Lamborghini (Note: Lamborghini raced for Forward Racing at the San Marino Grand Prix as a wildcard.)	1 (5)	0	0	0	0	0	NC
2011	Moto2	NGM Forward Racing	Suter MMXI	16	(France) Jules Cluzel	17	0	0	0	0	41	21st
2011	Moto2	NGM Forward Racing	Suter MMXI	25	(Italy) Alex Baldolini (Note: Baldolini rode for the team in the first ten races, then he was replaced by De Rosa. Both riders competed for other teams during the season.)	10 (14)	0	0	0	0	18	27th
2011	Moto2	NGM Forward Racing	Suter MMXI	35	(Italy) Raffaele De Rosa	7 (13)	0	0	0	0	0	NC
2012	MotoGP	NGM Mobile Forward Racing	BMW-Suter MMX1	5	(United States) Colin Edwards	17	0	0	0	0	27	20th
2012	MotoGP	NGM Mobile Forward Racing	BMW-Suter MMX1	7	(Australia) Chris Vermeulen (Note: Vermeulen replaced Edwards at the French Grand Prix.)	1	0	0	0	0	0	NC
2012	Moto2	NGM Mobile Forward Racing	Suter MMX2; FTR Moto M212	15	(San Marino) Alex de Angelis	16	1	2	0	1	86	10th
2012	Moto2	NGM Mobile Forward Racing	Suter MMX2; FTR Moto M212	72	(Japan) Yuki Takahashi	17	0	0	0	0	2	30th
2012	Moto2	NGM Mobile Forward Racing	FTR Moto M212	54	(Italy) Mattia Pasini (Note: Pasini replaced de Angelis at the Valencian Grand Prix.)	1	0	0	0	0	0	NC
2013	MotoGP	NGM Mobile Forward Racing	Kawasaki-FTR MGP13	5	(United States) Colin Edwards	18	0	0	0	0	41	14th
2013	MotoGP	NGM Mobile Forward Racing	Kawasaki-FTR MGP13	71	(Italy) Claudio Corti	18	0	0	0	0	14	19th
2013	Moto2	NGM Mobile Racing	Speed Up SF13	3	(Italy) Simone Corsi	17	0	1	0	0	108	11th
2013	Moto2	NGM Mobile Racing	Speed Up SF13	54	(Italy) Mattia Pasini	17	0	0	0	0	58	15th
2013	Moto2	NGM Mobile Forward Racing	Speed Up SF13	15	(San Marino) Alex de Angelis	17	0	0	0	0	81	14th
2013	Moto2	NGM Mobile Forward Racing	Speed Up SF13	88	(Spain) Ricard Cardús	17	0	0	0	0	9	23rd
2014	MotoGP	NGM Forward Racing	Forward-Yamaha	5	(United States) Colin Edwards	10	0	0	0	0	11	22nd
2014	MotoGP	NGM Forward Racing	Forward-Yamaha	41	(Spain) Aleix Espargaró	18	0	1	1	0	126	7th
2014	MotoGP	NGM Forward Racing	Forward-Yamaha	15	(San Marino) Alex de Angelis (Note: De Angelis replaced Edwards from the Czech Grand Prix onwards.)	8	0	0	0	0	14	21st
2014	Moto2	NGM Forward Racing	Forward KLX-Kalex; Kalex Moto2	3	(Italy) Simone Corsi	12	0	2	0	0	100	7th
2014	Moto2	NGM Forward Racing	Forward KLX-Kalex; Kalex Moto2	54	(Italy) Mattia Pasini	18	0	0	0	0	35	21st
2014	Moto2	NGM Forward Racing	Kalex Moto2	20	(France) Florian Marino (Note: Marino replaced Corsi from the San Marino Grand Prix onwards.)	6	0	0	0	0	0	NC
2015	MotoGP	Athinà Forward Racing; Forward Racing	Yamaha-Forward	6	(Germany) Stefan Bradl	8 (17)	0	0	0	0	9 (17)	18th
2015	MotoGP	Athinà Forward Racing; Forward Racing	Yamaha-Forward	76	(France) Loris Baz	17	0	0	0	0	28	17th
2015	MotoGP	Athinà Forward Racing; Forward Racing	Yamaha-Forward	71	(Italy) Claudio Corti (Note: Corti replaced Bradl from the German Grand Prix onwards. He was himself replaced by Toni Elías for the Aragon Grand Prix.)	4	0	0	0	0	0	NC
2015	MotoGP	Athinà Forward Racing; Forward Racing	Yamaha-Forward	24	(Spain) Toni Elías (Note: Elías replaced Corti from the Aragon Grand Prix onwards.)	5 (6)	0	0	0	0	2	27th
2015	Moto2	Athinà Forward Racing; Forward Racing	Kalex Moto2	3	(Italy) Simone Corsi	17	0	0	0	0	86	12th
2015	Moto2	Athinà Forward Racing; Forward Racing	Kalex Moto2	7	(Italy) Lorenzo Baldassarri	17	0	1	0	0	96	9th
2016	Moto2	Forward Team	Kalex Moto2	7	(Italy) Lorenzo Baldassarri	17	1	2	0	1	127	8th
2016	Moto2	Forward Team	Kalex Moto2	10	(Italy) Luca Marini	18	0	0	0	0	34	23rd
2017	Moto2	Forward Racing Team	Kalex Moto2	7	(Italy) Lorenzo Baldassarri	16	0	0	0	0	51	16th
2017	Moto2	Forward Racing Team	Kalex Moto2	10	(Italy) Luca Marini	16	0	0	0	0	59	15th
2017	Moto2	Forward Junior Team	Kalex Moto2	22	(Italy) Federico Fuligni	4 (6)	0	0	0	0	1	38th
2017	Moto2	Forward Junior Team	Kalex Moto2	22	(Italy) Federico Fuligni	1 (6)	0	0	0	0	0 (1)	38th
2018	Moto2	Forward Racing Team	Suter MMX2	51	(Brazil) Eric Granado	10	0	0	0	0	0	NC
2018	Moto2	Forward Racing Team	Suter MMX2	62	(Italy) Stefano Manzi	15	0	0	0	0	8	24th
2018	Moto2	Forward Racing Team	Suter MMX2	32	(Spain) Isaac Viñales	9 (17)	0	0	0	0	0 (7)	26th
2018	Moto2	Forward Racing Team	Suter MMX2	50	(Indonesia) Rafid Topan Sucipto	1	0	0	0	0	0	NC
2018	Moto2	Forward Racing Team	Suter MMX2	3	(Germany) Lukas Tulovic	1	0	0	0	0	0	NC
2019	Moto2	MV Agusta Idealavoro Forward; MV Agusta Temporary Forward	MV Agusta F2	62	(Italy) Stefano Manzi	18	0	0	0	0	39	19th
2019	Moto2	MV Agusta Idealavoro Forward; MV Agusta Temporary Forward	MV Agusta F2	77	(Switzerland) Dominique Aegerter	19	0	0	0	0	19	22nd
2019	Moto2	MV Agusta Idealavoro Forward; MV Agusta Temporary Forward	MV Agusta F2	6	(Italy) Gabriele Ruiu	1 (2)	0	0	0	0	0	NC
2020	Moto2	MV Agusta Forward Racing	MV Agusta F2	24	(Italy) Simone Corsi	14	0	0	0	0	15	24th
2020	Moto2	MV Agusta Forward Racing	MV Agusta F2	62	(Italy) Stefano Manzi	15	0	0	1	0	21	22nd
2021	Moto2	MV Agusta Forward Racing	MV Agusta F2	7	(Italy) Lorenzo Baldassarri	14	0	0	0	0	3	31st
2021	Moto2	MV Agusta Forward Racing	MV Agusta F2	24	(Italy) Simone Corsi	14	0	0	1	0	16	24th
2021	Moto2	MV Agusta Forward Racing	MV Agusta F2	10	(Italy) Tommaso Marcon	1 (5)	0	0	0	0	0	35th
2021	Moto2	MV Agusta Forward Racing	MV Agusta F2	10	(Italy) Tommaso Marcon	3 (5)	0	0	0	0	0	35th
2021	Moto2	MV Agusta Forward Racing	MV Agusta F2	77	(Spain) Miquel Pons	1	0	0	0	0	0	36th
2021	Moto2	MV Agusta Forward Racing	MV Agusta F2	18	(Spain) Manuel González	2	0	0	0	0	0	33rd
2022	Moto2	MV Agusta Forward Racing	MV Agusta F2	24	(Italy) Simone Corsi	19	0	0	0	0	0	35th
2022	Moto2	MV Agusta Forward Racing	MV Agusta F2	42	(Spain) Marcos Ramírez	20	0	0	0	0	5	30th
2022	Moto2	MV Agusta Forward Racing	MV Agusta F2	98	(Spain) David Sanchis	1	0	0	0	0	0	NC
2022	Moto2	MV Agusta Forward Racing	MV Agusta F2	17	(Spain) Álex Escrig	1	0	0	0	0	0	38th
2023	Moto2	Forward Team	Forward F2	17	(Spain) Álex Escrig	9	0	0	0	0	3	27th
2023	Moto2	Forward Team	Forward F2	42	(Spain) Marcos Ramírez	8 (19)	0	0 (1)	0	0	0 (65) (Note: Non-bracketed number refers to the number accumulated with the motorcycle, with number in brackets referring to the total accumulated for the season.)	16th
2023	Moto2	Forward Team	Forward F2	67	(Italy) Alberto Surra	8	0	0	0	0	0	33rd
2023	Moto2	Forward Team	Forward F2	98	(Spain) David Sanchis	3	0	0	0	0	0	43rd
2023	Moto2	Forward Team	Forward F2	19	(Italy) Lorenzo Dalla Porta	2	0	0	0	0	0	35th
2023	Moto2	Forward Team	Forward F2	55	(Spain) Yeray Ruiz	2	0	0	0	0	0	42nd
2023	Moto2	Forward Team	Forward F2	4	(United States) Sean Dylan Kelly	4 (14)	0	0	0	0	1	29th
2023	Moto2	Forward Team	Forward F2	4	(United States) Sean Dylan Kelly	2 (14)	0	0	0	0	0	29th
2024	Moto2	Klint Forward Factory Team	Forward F2	11	(Spain) Álex Escrig	18	0	0	0	0	0	33rd
2024	Moto2	Klint Forward Factory Team	Forward F2	43	(Spain) Xavier Artigas	19	0	0	0	0	10	25th
2024	Moto2	Klint Forward Factory Team	Forward F2	9	(Spain) Jorge Navarro	1 (9)	0	0 (1)	0	0	0 (27)	23rd
2024	Moto2	Klint Forward Factory Team	Forward F2	9	(Spain) Jorge Navarro	5 (9)	0	0 (1)	0	0	6 (27)	23rd
2024	Moto2	Klint Forward Factory Team	Forward F2	40	(Spain) Unai Orradre	1	0	0	0	0	0	41st
2024	MotoE	Klint Forward Factory Team	Ducati V21L	6	(Spain) María Herrera	16	0	0	0	0	43	16th
2024	MotoE	Klint Forward Factory Team	Ducati V21L	9	(Italy) Andrea Mantovani	16	0	0	0	0	113	9th
2024	WorldWCR	Klint Forward Factory Team	Yamaha YZF-R7	6	(Spain) María Herrera	12	6	9	3	1	215	2nd
2025	Moto2	Klint Forward Factory Team	Forward F2	9	(Spain) Jorge Navarro	22	0	0	0	0	3	29th
2025	Moto2	Klint Forward Factory Team	Forward F2	11	(Spain) Álex Escrig	20	0	0	0	0	25	22nd
2025	Moto2	Klint Forward Factory Team	Forward F2	17	(Spain) Daniel Muñoz	2 (8)	0	0 (1)	0	0 (1)	0 (37)	20th
2025	MotoE	Klint Forward Factory Team	Ducati V21L	6	(Spain) María Herrera	12	0	0	0	0	38	16th*
2025	MotoE	Klint Forward Factory Team	Ducati V21L	9	(Italy) Andrea Mantovani	14	1	4	0	2	135	7th
2025	WorldWCR	Klint Forward Factory Team	Yamaha YZF-R7	6	(Spain) María Herrera	12	6	10	3	0	245	1st
2025	WorldWCR	Klint Forward Factory Team	Yamaha YZF-R7	96	(Italy) Roberta Ponziani	12	1	2	2	3	156	4th
2026	Moto2	Klint Forward Factory Team	Forward F2	9	(Spain) Jorge Navarro	4	0	0	0	0	0*	31st*
2026	Moto2	Klint Forward Factory Team	Forward F2	11	(Spain) Álex Escrig	19	0	2	1	1	85*	12th*
2026	Moto2	Klint Forward Factory Team	Forward F2	85	(Spain) Xabi Zurutuza	14	0	0	0	0	0*	29th*
2026	Moto2	Klint Forward Factory Team	Forward F2	24	(Spain) Marcos Ramírez	3	0	0	0	0	0*	28th*
2026	WorldWCR	Klint Forward Factory Team	Yamaha YZF-R7	58	(Spain) Paola Ramos	11	4	7	4	5	167	3rd
2026	WorldWCR	Klint Forward Factory Team	Yamaha YZF-R7	96	(Italy) Roberta Ponziani	12	0	3	1	1	143	4th

Key
Regular rider
Replacement rider
Wildcard rider
Replacement/wildcard rider

Notes

* Season still in progress.
