= 2012 Catalan motorcycle Grand Prix =

(Catalonia) 2012 Catalan Grand Prix
Race details
- Race 5 of 18 races in the 2012 Grand Prix motorcycle racing season
- Date: 3 June 2012
- Official name: Gran Premi Aperol de Catalunya
- Location: Circuit de Catalunya
- Course: Permanent racing facility; 4.727 km (2.937 mi)

MotoGP
Pole position
Rider	(Australia) Casey Stoner	Honda
Time	1:41.295	
Fastest lap
Rider	(Spain) Jorge Lorenzo	Yamaha
Time	1:42.642	
Podium
First	(Spain) Jorge Lorenzo	Yamaha
Second	(Spain) Dani Pedrosa	Honda
Third	(Italy) Andrea Dovizioso	Yamaha

Moto2
Pole position
Rider	(Spain) Marc Márquez	Suter
Time	1:46.187	
Fastest lap
Rider	(Switzerland) Thomas Lüthi	Suter
Time	1:46.631	
Podium
First	(Italy) Andrea Iannone	Speed Up
Second	(Switzerland) Thomas Lüthi	Suter
Third	(Spain) Marc Márquez	Suter

Moto3
Pole position
Rider	(Spain) Maverick Viñales	FTR Honda
Time	1:52.160	
Fastest lap
Rider	(Spain) Álex Márquez	Suter Honda
Time	1:52.583	
Podium
First	(Spain) Maverick Viñales	FTR Honda
Second	(Germany) Sandro Cortese	KTM
Third	(Portugal) Miguel Oliveira	Suter Honda

The 2012 Catalan motorcycle Grand Prix was the fifth round of the 2012 Grand Prix motorcycle racing season and the 17th Catalan motorcycle Grand Prix. It took place on the weekend of 1–3 June 2012 at the Circuit de Catalunya in Montmeló, Barcelona, Spain. The three classes of motorcycle racing which took place during the weekend were MotoGP, Moto2 and Moto3.

Casey Stoner qualified on pole position in MotoGP, but it was his Repsol Honda teammate, Dani Pedrosa, who started in fifth place that took the lead at the first corner. Ben Spies was in second place for the first three laps, but slid off the track when challenging for the lead. This allowed the other factory Yamaha rider and championship leader Jorge Lorenzo to move up into second place and engage in a race long battle for the win with Pedrosa. Meanwhile, Stoner was behind the Tech 3 Yamaha of Andrea Dovizioso, and was battling with the other of Cal Crutchlow. He eventually beat Crutchlow to take fourth place whilst Dovizioso took the first podium of the year for the Tech 3 Yamaha team. As a consequence of the race, Lorenzo increased his lead in the riders' standings to 20 points over Stoner. Pedrosa remained third in the standings, with 30 fewer points than Lorenzo.

In Moto2, Marc Márquez took his fourth consecutive pole position by beating championship leader and fellow Spaniard Pol Espargaró by two-tenths of a second. Thomas Lüthi completed the front row with Andrea Iannone in fourth place; it was these four riders who dominated the race, staying in close company for the majority of it too. Iannone led almost every lap to take the victory, but had to resist pressure in the closing laps to take his first win of the season. Lüthi finished second and Márquez finished third after winning an appeal against a one-minute penalty issued by the FIM for a collision between himself and Espargaró, which had resulted in retirement of the Kalex rider with three laps remaining. The result rearranged the order in the riders' standings with Lüthi now leading the way on 88 points with Márquez only 2 behind. Not far behind them were Espargaró and Iannone, still firmly in contention, on 71 and 70 points respectively, the reduced gap down to the Italian's victory.

The Moto3 race was not as close as the one in the other two categories as Maverick Viñales won his home race from pole position. It was his second victory of the season. Zulfahmi Khairuddin's first front-row for any Malaysian rider, second place, failed to translate into a great result and he finished down in eighth. It was a close eighth though, as he and the six riders in front of him had squabbled in close proximity for the majority of the race allowing Viñales to break away. Sandro Cortese and Miguel Oliveira emerged victorious in the tight battle to the line to take second and third place to complete the podium. Álex Márquez set the fastest lap of the race. As a consequence of the race, Cortese was still leading the riders' standings on 87 points but, with victory, Viñales was now just 7 points behind him. Luis Salom remained third in the standings, but was now on a fairly distant 55 points, 32 fewer than Cortese.

== Report ==
=== MotoGP ===
==== Background and qualifying ====
Jorge Lorenzo entered the event leading the Riders' standings following his win at the preceding event – the French Grand Prix. Reigning world champion Casey Stoner was second in the standings, eight points behind Lorenzo, whilst his Honda teammate, Dani Pedrosa, was seventeen points behind him. Yamaha led the way in the Manufacturers' standings, all 90 of their points courtesy of Lorenzo. Honda were 4 points behind them, and Ducati remained in third place after Valentino Rossi scored their first podium of the season in Le Mans. Colin Edwards returned to his CRT ride after breaking his collarbone at the Portuguese Grand Prix four weeks previously; he had been replaced with Chris Vermeulen for the French Grand Prix. Bridgestone took asymmetric tyres to the race for the bikes to compensate for the large number of long, right-handed corners on the track.

Stoner took pole position in qualifying for the event, his second of the season, and the third for his team. Lorenzo qualified in second position, one tenth slower than the pole time. Crutchlow completed the front row by qualifying third for the third time in the season for the Tech 3 Yamaha team. A resurgent Ben Spies set a time fast enough for fourth position, but was still only the third fastest Yamaha on the grid. Stoner's teammate Pedrosa, the polesitter from the previous race, qualified fifth, after he ran off the track on his final timed run. He was in front of the other Tech 3 Yamaha of Andrea Dovizioso, who completed the closely matched top six with a time just fourth tenths slower than Stoner's. The first Ducati rider was Nicky Hayden, who started the third row of the grid. He was followed by the LCR Honda of Stefan Bradl, who took his best qualifying position of the season so far, and then Valentino Rossi. Álvaro Bautista was accompanied by Barberá and Karel Abraham on the fourth row of the grid. Behind them, in thirteenth, Randy de Puniet was the highest qualifying CRT rider. Colin Edwards was fourteenth behind him on his return alongside Aleix Espargaró, de Puniet's teammate. Michele Pirro, James Ellison, Mattia Pasini, Yonny Hernández, Danilo Petrucci and Iván Silva were sixteenth to twenty-first respectively, completing the grid on the final two rows.

Cal Crutchlow set the fastest time in the warm-up session for the event in slippery conditions on the morning of the race, with Stoner second fastest and Rossi third, narrowly ahead of an impressive Bautista. The conditions lead to crashes from some riders, including falls from Pedrosa, James Ellison and Héctor Barberá.

==== Race ====
The conditions at the start of the race were warm and humid, with an ambient temperature of 27 °C (81 °F) and a track temperature of 38 °C (100 °F). All the riders chose to race on the softer tyre on both the front and rear, except from the two Repsol Hondas of Stoner and Pedrosa, who started with the harder tyre on both front and rear.

At the start of the race, Pedrosa took the lead at the first turn, despite his fifth place starting spot. Ben Spies, who had moved up into second, attempted to overtake Pedrosa around the outside of turn 3, but had to give best. His teammate, Lorenzo, had dropped down to third in front of polesitter Stoner. The two Tech 3 Yamahas were fifth and sixth, with Dovizioso ahead of Crutchlow. Later on in the first lap, Dovizioso overtook Stoner for fourth place while Nicky Hayden dropped from seventh to tenth – first behind Stefan Bradl, then behind teammate Rossi and next behind Álvaro Bautista. Stoner then ran slightly wide, allowing Crutchlow to take fifth place. On the third lap, Spies once again tried to take the lead from Pedrosa at Turn 3, and temporarily did. However, he continued to run off into the gravel before falling off his bike and having to rejoin the track down in last place.

The order then began to settle down, and the top five of Pedrosa, Lorenzo, Dovizioso, Crutchlow and Stoner began to pull out a gap to the rest the field. Behind them, Bautista, Bradl, and the Ducatis of Rossi and Hayden continued to fight over the following four places. Lorenzo took the lead from Pedrosa at the first turn on the sixth lap of the race, and started to build a gap immediately. Meanwhile, Stoner overtook Crutchlow to regain the position he had lost on the first lap, but the pair had already fallen two seconds behind the leading three bikes by this point.

On lap 11, Pedrosa retook the lead from Lorenzo on the main straight, while Dovizioso remained close behind the pair. On the following lap, whilst trying to regain the position, Lorenzo overshot at the corner and was forced to ride across the kerbs to avoid the gravel. Dovizioso fell back to the ongoing battle between Stoner and Crutchlow on lap 15, whilst another battle between Bautista (sixth) and Rossi (seventh) began to catch up. After numerous attempts, Lorenzo managed to pass Pedrosa again to take the lead of the race with 6 laps remaining with a manoeuvre down the inside of turn 10. Pedrosa had a large, unintentional wheelie entering the corner due to problems with his bike, possibly allowing the pass to happen. The two riders now had a large lead over everyone else, but Pedrosa began to fall back from Lorenzo in the final three laps. On the 23rd and penultimate lap, Ben Spies managed to return into the top 10 by overtaking Héctor Barberá (Spies had been running in eleventh since lap 12, half-way through the race). On the final lap, Stoner managed to pull away from Crutchlow and catch up with Dovizioso; however, he wasn't able to make a pass and take a podium place.

Jorge Lorenzo won the race to take his third victory of the season in front of his home fans, extending his championship lead over Stoner to 20 points. Lorenzo also set the fastest lap of the race. Dani Pedrosa finished second, a result he was disappointed with because he felt he could have won the race. He remained in third place in the standings, 30 points adrift of Lorenzo. Andrea Dovizioso completed the podium, taking Yamaha Tech 3's, and his, first podium of the season. Dovizioso described the good result as a "beautiful" moment. He was closely pursued by Stoner at the end of a race, whose fourth-place finish was his first off the podium in 2012. Stoner conceded that the decision to use the harder tyres instead of the soft was a wrong one because it cost him too much time at the start of the race. Cal Crutchlow's fifth place left him behind his teammate in the championship, but was a good result nonetheless. Crutchlow said the result could have been better if a "lack of experience" hadn't lead to him being conservative at the beginning of the race. Álvaro Bautista finished the race in sixth position, ahead of Valentino Rossi on the improving Ducati bike. Stefan Bradl finished eighth, where he had started, and Nicky Hayden finished ninth. The Yamaha team stated that they were pleased with Ben Spies' performance, despite his fall near the start of the race – he finished in tenth place. The Ducati riders of Barberá and Abraham finished in eleventh and twelfth, ahead of the top finishing CRT rider of Aleix Espargaró (who simultaneously became the highest ranking CRT rider in standings). Michele Pirro and Randy de Puniet, Espargaró's teammate, completed the points in fourteenth and fifteenth. The other five classified riders were Ellison, Pasini, Hernández, Petrucci and Silva; Edwards was not classified as he finished in the pitlane, one lap down.

=== Moto2 ===
Kalex rider Pol Espargaró entered the event leading the Riders' standings for the first time by one point, after his rival Marc Márquez crashed out of the previous race at Le Mans.

In qualifying, Márquez claimed his fourth pole position in five races, almost two-tenths clear of the rest of the field. Espargaró and Thomas Lüthi joined him on the front row, with Andrea Iannone in fourth place. These four riders dominated the race, staying in close company for the majority of it. Iannone led almost every lap, but had to resist heavy pressure in the final laps to take his first win of the season. Lüthi finished second, and Márquez finished third.

On lap 21, with three laps remaining, Márquez was running in second when he lost the front-end of his bike. He was able to save himself from a crash, but as he steered back onto the racing line, he collided with Espargaró. Espargaró was forced to retire, and Márquez was issued a controversial one-minute penalty by Race Direction. He was dropped from third to twenty-third in the race results. The decision was criticised by Valentino Rossi and Casey Stoner. The FIM Stewards overturned the decision, which was then appealed again by Espargaró's team. The International Disciplinary Court (CDI) ultimately upheld the Stewards' decision and ruled in Márquez's favour, reinstating his third-place finish. Lüthi became the new championship leader, with Márquez trailing by two points and Espargaró in third.

=== Moto3 ===
KTM rider Sandro Cortese entered the event leading the Riders' standings on total of 67 points. 12 points behind him was his championship rival, the FTR Honda of Maverick Viñales. The Kalex KTM of Luis Salom was third in the standings, six points behind Viñales. In the Manufacturers' standings, FTR and KTM were joint in the lead, each with a total of 68 points. Kalex had accumulated the third highest total of 56 points.

In qualifying for the race, Maverick Viñales took his second pole position of the season, and his second in succession, by setting a time nearly three-tenths faster than the rest of the field. Zulfahmi Khairuddin became the first Malaysian to ever achieve a front row start in a motorcycle Grand Prix, when he set the second fastest time for KTM. The winner of the previous race, and Viñales' FTR Honda teammate, Louis Rossi, took the final front row spot of third place. Sandro Cortese qualified fourth after suffering a heavy crash in that morning's practice session. He suffered heavy bruising to his right hand, and had to have blood drained during the session. Fifth place went to Miguel Oliveira, the Suter rider, who was at the centre of drama late on in the session, as his swift move across the track took out Alan Techer and Brad Binder. None of the riders were hurt in the incident. The second row was completed by Binder's teammate Luis Salom, who like Viñales and various other riders, was in front of his home crowd. Alexis Masbou qualified seventh for his 100th Grand Prix start. Efrén Vázquez, Héctor Faubel and Álex Márquez completed the top ten. Romano Fenati, winner of the Spanish Grand Prix earlier in 2012, had a disappointing session, and could only manage thirteenth. All 34 riders successfully set a lap time, and all started the following day's race.

In the warm up session, on the day of the race, Viñales once again set the fastest time, with Rossi second and Vázquez third, albeit seven-tenths off the pace.

== Classification ==
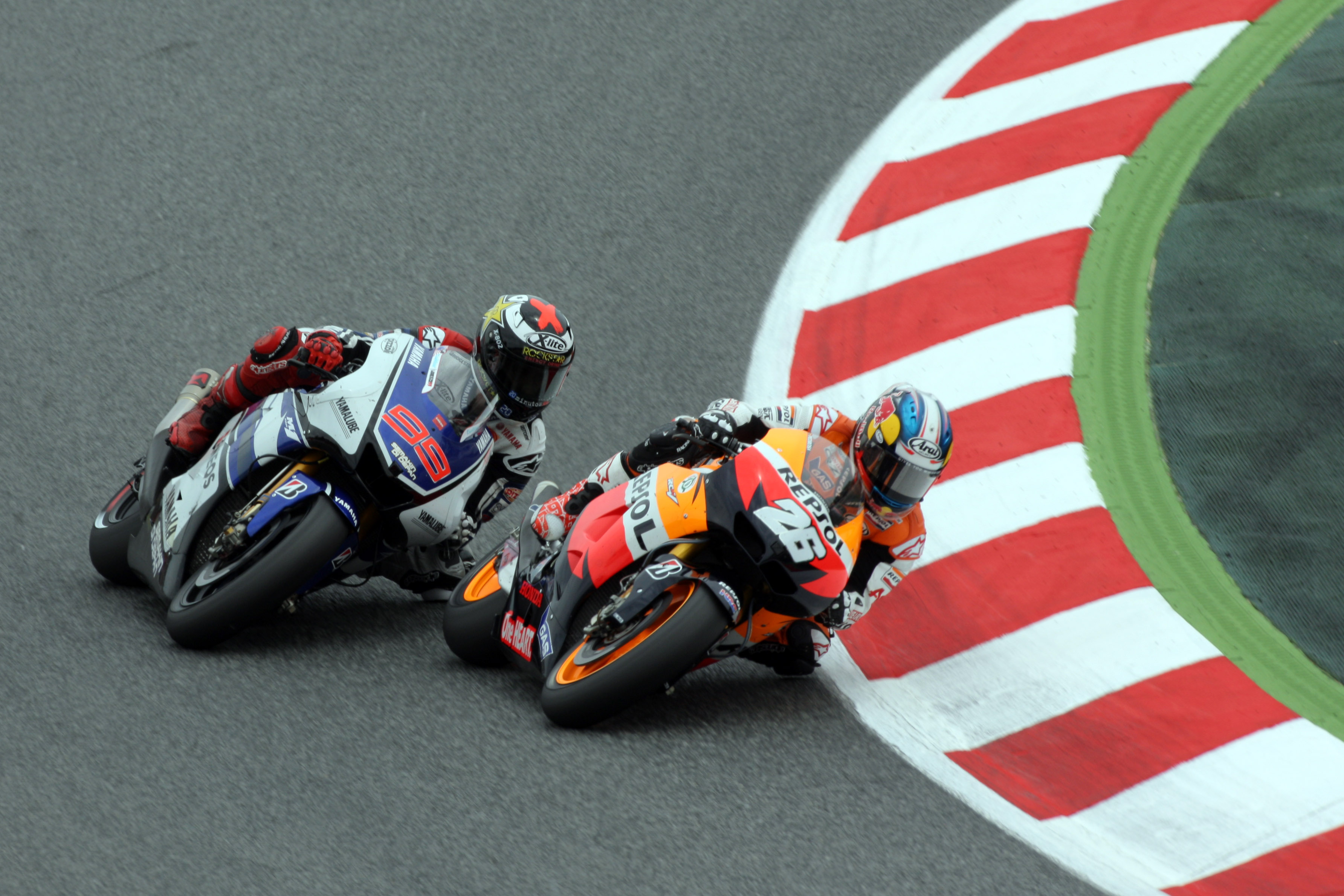
Dani Pedrosa and Jorge Lorenzo, battling for the lead in the MotoGP race. Lorenzo went on to win, with Pedrosa finishing in second place.

=== MotoGP ===
Pos.	No.	Rider	Team	Manufacturer	Laps	Time/Retired	Grid	Points
1	99	(Spain) Jorge Lorenzo	Yamaha Factory Racing	Yamaha	25	43:07.681	2	25
2	26	(Spain) Dani Pedrosa	Repsol Honda Team	Honda	25	+5.003	5	20
3	4	(Italy) Andrea Dovizioso	Monster Yamaha Tech 3	Yamaha	25	+9.361	6	16
4	1	(Australia) Casey Stoner	Repsol Honda Team	Honda	25	+9.544	1	13
5	35	(United Kingdom) Cal Crutchlow	Monster Yamaha Tech 3	Yamaha	25	+12.506	3	11
6	19	(Spain) Álvaro Bautista	San Carlo Honda Gresini	Honda	25	+13.948	10	10
7	46	(Italy) Valentino Rossi	Ducati Team	Ducati	25	+17.555	9	9
8	6	(Germany) Stefan Bradl	LCR Honda MotoGP	Honda	25	+23.478	8	8
9	69	(United States) Nicky Hayden	Ducati Team	Ducati	25	+30.410	7	7
10	11	(United States) Ben Spies	Yamaha Factory Racing	Yamaha	25	+32.897	4	6
11	8	(Spain) Héctor Barberá	Pramac Racing Team	Ducati	25	+36.144	11	5
12	17	(Czech Republic) Karel Abraham	Cardion AB Motoracing	Ducati	25	+56.229	12	4
13	41	(Spain) Aleix Espargaró	Power Electronics Aspar	ART	25	+1:08.054	15	3
14	51	(Italy) Michele Pirro	San Carlo Honda Gresini	FTR	25	+1:08.775	16	2
15	14	(France) Randy de Puniet	Power Electronics Aspar	ART	25	+1:10.483	13	1
16	77	(United Kingdom) James Ellison	Paul Bird Motorsport	ART	25	+1:13.090	17	
17	54	(Italy) Mattia Pasini	Speed Master	ART	25	+1:20.903	18	
18	68	(Colombia) Yonny Hernández	Avintia Blusens	BQR	25	+1:21.235	19	
19	9	(Italy) Danilo Petrucci	Came IodaRacing Project	Ioda	25	+1:41.207	20	
20	22	(Spain) Iván Silva	Avintia Blusens	BQR	25	+1:41.888	21	
NC	5	(United States) Colin Edwards	NGM Mobile Forward Racing	Suter	24	+1 lap	14	

=== Moto2 ===
Pos	No	Rider	Manufacturer	Laps	Time/Retired	Grid	Points
1	29	(Italy) Andrea Iannone	Speed Up	23	41:16.852	4	25
2	12	(Switzerland) Thomas Lüthi	Suter	23	+0.083	3	20
3	93	(Spain) Marc Márquez	Suter	23	+1.137	1	16
4	80	(Spain) Esteve Rabat	Kalex	23	+12.516	9	13
5	3	(Italy) Simone Corsi	FTR	23	+14.226	5	11
6	30	(Japan) Takaaki Nakagami	Kalex	23	+15.072	12	10
7	77	(Switzerland) Dominique Aegerter	Suter	23	+16.255	6	9
8	4	(Switzerland) Randy Krummenacher	Kalex	23	+16.354	20	8
9	36	(Finland) Mika Kallio	Kalex	23	+16.606	19	7
10	45	(United Kingdom) Scott Redding	Kalex	23	+16.793	7	6
11	5	(France) Johann Zarco	Motobi	23	+17.298	14	5
12	38	(United Kingdom) Bradley Smith	Tech 3	23	+22.242	13	4
13	71	(Italy) Claudio Corti	Kalex	23	+23.763	16	3
14	15	(San Marino) Alex de Angelis	Suter	23	+24.069	10	2
15	18	(Spain) Nicolás Terol	Suter	23	+27.039	15	1
16	81	(Spain) Jordi Torres	Tech 3	23	+32.158	11	
17	76	(Germany) Max Neukirchner	Kalex	23	+34.389	26	
18	14	(Thailand) Ratthapark Wilairot	Suter	23	+35.387	27	
19	88	(Spain) Ricard Cardús	AJR	23	+35.501	25	
20	47	(Spain) Ángel Rodríguez	Bimota	23	+35.623	21	
21	72	(Japan) Yuki Takahashi	Suter	23	+35.803	22	
22	49	(Spain) Axel Pons	Kalex	23	+36.903	28	
23	7	(Sweden) Alexander Lundh	MZ-RE Honda	23	+1:16.309	30	
24	10	(Switzerland) Marco Colandrea	FTR	23	+1:18.573	31	
25	82	(Spain) Elena Rosell	Moriwaki	23	+1:35.551	32	
DSQ	95	(Australia) Anthony West	Moriwaki	23	(+52.636)	29	
Ret	40	(Spain) Pol Espargaró	Kalex	20	Collision	2	
Ret	44	(Italy) Roberto Rolfo	Suter	20	Retirement	18	
Ret	24	(Spain) Toni Elías	Suter	19	Retirement	8	
Ret	60	(Spain) Julián Simón	Suter	0	Collision	17	
Ret	8	(United Kingdom) Gino Rea	Suter	0	Collision	23	
Ret	63	(France) Mike Di Meglio	Speed Up	0	Collision	24	
OFFICIAL MOTO2 REPORT

=== Moto3 ===
Pos	No	Rider	Manufacturer	Laps	Time/Retired	Grid	Points
1	25	(Spain) Maverick Viñales	FTR Honda	22	41:50.965	1	25
2	11	(Germany) Sandro Cortese	KTM	22	+7.752	4	20
3	44	(Portugal) Miguel Oliveira	Suter Honda	22	+7.853	5	16
4	96	(France) Louis Rossi	FTR Honda	22	+8.007	3	13
5	10	(France) Alexis Masbou	Honda	22	+8.075	7	11
6	12	(Spain) Álex Márquez	Suter Honda	22	+8.267	11	10
7	55	(Spain) Héctor Faubel	Kalex KTM	22	+8.355	9	9
8	63	(Malaysia) Zulfahmi Khairuddin	KTM	22	+8.480	2	8
9	5	(Italy) Romano Fenati	FTR Honda	22	+8.600	13	7
10	39	(Spain) Luis Salom	Kalex KTM	22	+16.023	6	6
11	84	(Czech Republic) Jakub Kornfeil	FTR Honda	22	+16.127	12	5
12	27	(Italy) Niccolò Antonelli	FTR Honda	22	+16.222	10	4
13	89	(France) Alan Techer	TSR Honda	22	+16.792	21	3
14	23	(Spain) Alberto Moncayo	Kalex KTM	22	+30.132	17	2
15	8	(Australia) Jack Miller	Honda	22	+30.132	20	1
16	53	(Netherlands) Jasper Iwema	FGR Honda	22	+30.304	25	
17	26	(Spain) Adrián Martín	FTR Honda	22	+30.663	28	
18	21	(Spain) Iván Moreno	FTR Honda	22	+30.970	23	
19	17	(United Kingdom) John McPhee	KRP Honda	22	+31.042	15	
20	52	(United Kingdom) Danny Kent	KTM	22	+43.738	14	
21	31	(Finland) Niklas Ajo	KTM	22	+43.765	24	
22	61	(Australia) Arthur Sissis	KTM	22	+44.119	19	
23	15	(Italy) Simone Grotzkyj	Suter Honda	22	+1:02.007	26	
24	32	(Spain) Isaac Viñales	FTR Honda	22	+1:11.320	27	
25	51	(Japan) Kenta Fujii	TSR Honda	22	+1:19.060	33	
26	3	(Italy) Luigi Morciano	Ioda	22	+1:19.314	34	
27	30	(Switzerland) Giulian Pedone	Suter Honda	22	+1:19.331	32	
28	19	(Italy) Alessandro Tonucci	FTR Honda	21	+1 lap	18	
Ret	99	(United Kingdom) Danny Webb	Mahindra	16	Accident	31	
Ret	77	(Germany) Marcel Schrötter	Mahindra	16	Retirement	30	
Ret	42	(Spain) Álex Rins	Suter Honda	15	Accident	16	
Ret	7	(Spain) Efrén Vázquez	FTR Honda	15	Accident	8	
Ret	41	(South Africa) Brad Binder	Kalex KTM	6	Collision	22	
Ret	94	(Germany) Jonas Folger	Ioda	4	Retirement	29	
OFFICIAL MOTO3 REPORT

== Championship standings after the race (MotoGP) ==
Below are the standings for the top five riders and constructors after round five has concluded.

Riders' Championship standings

Pos.	Rider	Points
1	(Spain) Jorge Lorenzo	115
2	(Australia) Casey Stoner	95
3	(Spain) Dani Pedrosa	85
4	(Italy) Andrea Dovizioso	60
5	(United Kingdom) Cal Crutchlow	56

Constructors' Championship standings

Pos.	Constructor	Points
1	(Japan) Yamaha	115
2	(Japan) Honda	106
3	(Italy) Ducati	56
4	(Italy) ART	19
5	(United Kingdom) FTR	6

- Note: Only the top five positions are included for both sets of standings.

Previous race: 2012 French Grand Prix	FIM Grand Prix World Championship; 2012 season	Next race: 2012 British Grand Prix
Previous race: 2011 Catalan Grand Prix	Catalan motorcycle Grand Prix	Next race: 2013 Catalan Grand Prix
