= Elena Rosell =

Spanish motorcycle racer

- Nationality: Spanish
- Born: 30 April 1986 (age 40); Valencia, Spain
- Current team: MaxiGass Motos Yamaha
- Bike number: 82
Motorcycle racing career statistics
Moto2 World Championship
Active years	2011–2012
Manufacturers	Moriwaki, Suter, Speed Up
Championships	0
2012 championship position	NC (0 pts)
Starts / Wins / Podiums / Poles / F. laps / Points; 19 / 0 / 0 / 0 / 0 / 0

Elena Rosell Aragón (born 30 April 1986 in Valencia) is a Spanish motorcycle racer. She was the first female Spanish rider in world championship racing when she substituted for an injured Moto2 rider in 2011.

During 2019, Rosell competed in the CIV Stock Spanish series.

Previously, Rosell rode in the RFME Campeonato de España de Velocidad (CEV) Superstock 600 aboard a Kawasaki ZX-6R.

== Career statistics ==
=== Grand Prix motorcycle racing ===
==== By season ====
Season	Class	Motorcycle	Team	Number	Race	Win	Podium	Pole	FLap	Pts	Plcd
2011	Moto2	Suter	Mapfre Aspar Team Moto2	82	2	0	0	0	0	0	NC
2012	Moto2	Moriwaki	QMMF Racing Team	82	17	0	0	0	0	0	NC
2012	Moto2	Speed Up	QMMF Racing Team	82	17	0	0	0	0	0	NC
Total					19	0	0	0	0	0	

==== Races by year ====
(key)

Year	Class	Bike	1	2	3	4	5	6	7	8	9	10	11	12	13	14	15	16	17	Pos	Pts
2011	Moto2	Suter	QAT	SPA	POR	FRA	CAT	GBR	NED; DNQ	ITA	GER	CZE	INP	RSM	ARA; 33	JPN	AUS	MAL	VAL; 25	NC	0
2012	Moto2	Moriwaki	QAT; 29	SPA; Ret	POR; 26	FRA; Ret	CAT; 25	GBR; 30	NED; 24	GER; Ret	ITA; Ret	INP; Ret								NC	0
2012	Moto2	Speed Up											CZE; 26	RSM; Ret	ARA; 26	JPN; 26	MAL; 19	AUS; 23	VAL; Ret	NC	0
