= Louis Rossi =

French motorcycle racer

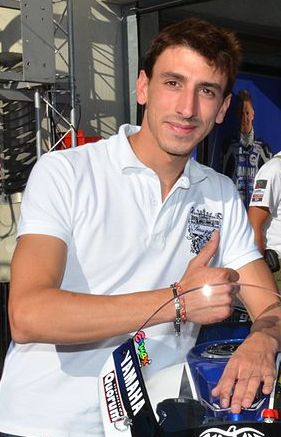
- Rossi in 2012.
- Nationality: French
- Born: 23 June 1989 (age 37); Le Mans, France
- Current team: Junior Team LMS Suzuki
- Bike number: 72
Motorcycle racing career statistics
Moto2 World Championship
Active years	2013–2015
Manufacturers	Tech 3, Kalex
Championships	0
2015 championship position	25th (7 pts)
Starts / Wins / Podiums / Poles / F. laps / Points; 51 / 0 / 0 / 0 / 0 / 31
Moto3 World Championship
Active years	2012
Manufacturers	FTR Honda
Championships	0
2012 championship position	11th (86 pts)
Starts / Wins / Podiums / Poles / F. laps / Points; 17 / 1 / 1 / 0 / 0 / 86
125cc World Championship
Active years	2007–2008, 2010–2011
Manufacturers	Aprilia, Honda
Championships	0
2011 championship position	17th (31 pts)
Starts / Wins / Podiums / Poles / F. laps / Points; 47 / 0 / 0 / 0 / 0 / 33

Louis Rossi (born 23 June 1989 in Le Mans) is a French former Grand Prix motorcycle racer, best known for winning the 2012 French Grand Prix in the Moto3 class. He has also previously competed in the French 125GP Championship (where he finished runner-up in 2007), the Spanish 125GP Championship, and the Endurance FIM World Championship. In 2022, he entered the Ligier European Series - JS P4, where he did two races; in 2023, he entered the Ligier European Series - JS P4 class and came fifth in the championship. He participated in the European Le Mans Series - LMP3 where he finished 19th and now is in the European Le Mans Series - LMP3 driving in a Ligier JS P325 for Ultimate.

== Career statistics ==
=== Career highlights ===
- 2016 - NC, FIM Superstock 1000 Cup, Yamaha YZF-R1

=== FIM CEV Moto2 European Championship ===
==== Races by year ====
(key) (Races in bold indicate pole position, races in italics indicate fastest lap)

Year	Bike	1	2	3	4	5	6	7	8	9	10	11	Pos	Pts
2016	Transfiormers	VAL1; 6	VAL2; 16	ARA1	ARA2	CAT1	CAT2	ALB	ALG1	ALG2	JER	VAL	22nd	12
2016	MVP	VAL1	VAL2	ARA1	ARA2	CAT1	CAT2	ALB	ALG1	ALG2	JER; 14	VAL	22nd	12

=== Superstock 1000 Cup ===
==== Races by year ====
(key) (Races in bold indicate pole position) (Races in italics indicate fastest lap)

Year	Bike	1	2	3	4	5	6	7	8	Pos	Pts
2016	Yamaha	ARA	NED	IMO; 17	DON	MIS	LAU	MAG	JER	NC	0

=== Grand Prix motorcycle racing ===
==== By season ====
Season	Class	Motorcycle	Team	Race	Win	Podium	Pole	FLap	Pts	Plcd
2007	125cc	Honda	FFM Honda GP 125	1	0	0	0	0	0	NC
2008	125cc	Honda	FFM Honda GP 125	12	0	0	0	0	0	NC
2010	125cc	Aprilia	CBC Corse	17	0	0	0	0	2	28th
2011	125cc	Aprilia	Matteoni Racing	17	0	0	0	0	31	17th
2012	Moto3	FTR Honda	Racing Team Germany	17	1	1	0	0	86	11th
2013	Moto2	Tech 3	Tech 3	17	0	0	0	0	6	24th
2014	Moto2	Kalex	SAG Team	18	0	0	0	0	18	26th
2015	Moto2	Tech 3	Tasca Racing Scuderia Moto2	16	0	0	0	0	7	25th
Total				**115**	**1**	**1**	**0**	**0**	**150**	

==== Races by year ====
(key)

Yr	Class	Bike	1	2	3	4	5	6	7	8	9	10	11	12	13	14	15	16	17	18	Pos	Pts
2007	125cc	Honda	QAT	SPA	TUR	CHN	FRA	ITA	CAT	GBR	NED	GER	CZE	RSM	POR; 24	JPN	AUS	MAL	VAL		NC	0
2008	125cc	Honda	QAT; 25	SPA; 24	POR; WD	CHN; 18	FRA; 19	ITA; 32	CAT; 25	GBR; 23	NED; 24	GER; 21	CZE; 29	RSM; 23	INP	JPN	AUS	MAL	VAL; 23		NC	0
2010	125cc	Aprilia	QAT; 17	SPA; Ret	FRA; 21	ITA; Ret	GBR; 19	NED; 19	CAT; 17	GER; Ret	CZE; 14	INP; Ret	RSM; 19	ARA; Ret	JPN; 18	MAL; 17	AUS; 17	POR; Ret	VAL; Ret		28th	2
2011	125cc	Aprilia	QAT; 15	SPA; 14	POR; Ret	FRA; 13	CAT; 12	GBR; 13	NED; 30	ITA; Ret	GER; 18	CZE; 15	INP; 12	RSM; Ret	ARA; Ret	JPN; DNS	AUS; 9	MAL; 18	VAL; 10		17th	31
2012	Moto3	FTR Honda	QAT; 9	SPA; Ret	POR; Ret	FRA; 1	CAT; 4	GBR; Ret	NED; 5	GER; Ret	ITA; Ret	INP; 13	CZE; 17	RSM; Ret	ARA; 7	JPN; 8	MAL; Ret	AUS; 20	VAL; 6		11th	86
2013	Moto2	Tech 3	QAT; Ret	AME; 23	SPA; 24	FRA; 14	ITA; 25	CAT; Ret	NED; 12	GER; 21	INP; 23	CZE; 19	GBR; 23	RSM; 19	ARA; 18	MAL; 16	AUS; Ret	JPN; Ret	VAL; 23		24th	6
2014	Moto2	Kalex	QAT; 10	AME; Ret	ARG; 25	SPA; Ret	FRA; Ret	ITA; 20	CAT; 15	NED; 28	GER; 13	INP; 13	CZE; 16	GBR; 17	RSM; 26	ARA; 20	JPN; 16	AUS; 12	MAL; Ret	VAL; 15	26th	18
2015	Moto2	Tech 3	QAT; 9	AME; 22	ARG; Ret	SPA; DNS	FRA; Ret	ITA; 20	CAT; 23	NED; Ret	GER; Ret	INP; Ret	CZE; Ret	GBR; 27	RSM; 19	ARA; 23	JPN; 20	AUS; 23	MAL; 18	VAL; DNS	25th	7
