= 2012 French motorcycle Grand Prix =

(France) 2012 French Grand Prix
Race details
- Race 4 of 18 races in the 2012 Grand Prix motorcycle racing season
- Date: 20 May 2012
- Official name: Monster Energy Grand Prix de France
- Location: Bugatti Circuit
- Course: Permanent racing facility; 4.185 km (2.600 mi)

MotoGP
Pole position
Rider	(Spain) Dani Pedrosa	Honda
Time	1:33.638	
Fastest lap
Rider	(Italy) Valentino Rossi	Ducati
Time	1:44.614	
Podium
First	(Spain) Jorge Lorenzo	Yamaha
Second	(Italy) Valentino Rossi	Ducati
Third	(Australia) Casey Stoner	Honda

Moto2
Pole position
Rider	(Spain) Marc Márquez	Suter
Time	1:37.710	
Fastest lap
Rider	(Italy) Claudio Corti	Kalex
Time	1:53.855	
Podium
First	(Switzerland) Thomas Lüthi	Suter
Second	(Italy) Claudio Corti	Kalex
Third	(United Kingdom) Scott Redding	Kalex

Moto3
Pole position
Rider	(Spain) Maverick Viñales	FTR Honda
Time	1:55.865	
Fastest lap
Rider	(Czech Republic) Jakub Kornfeil	FTR Honda
Time	2:01.056	
Podium
First	(France) Louis Rossi	FTR Honda
Second	(Spain) Alberto Moncayo	Kalex KTM
Third	(Spain) Álex Rins	Suter Honda

The 2012 French motorcycle Grand Prix was the fourth round of the 2012 Grand Prix motorcycle racing season. It took place on the weekend of 18–20 May 2012 at the Bugatti Circuit in Le Mans, France. In a press conference on the Thursday before the race, Casey Stoner announced his retirement from the sport at the end of the season. He went on to finish third in the MotoGP race, handing the championship lead to Jorge Lorenzo, the race winner. Valentino Rossi took second place for his first podium since the previous year's race. Thomas Lüthi and Louis Rossi won the Moto2 and Moto3 races respectively. This was the 800th race to contribute to the Grand Prix motorcycle racing championship.

== Classification ==
=== MotoGP ===
Pos.	No.	Rider	Team	Manufacturer	Laps	Time/Retired	Grid	Points
1	99	(Spain) Jorge Lorenzo	Yamaha Factory Racing	Yamaha	28	49:39.743	4	25
2	46	(Italy) Valentino Rossi	Ducati Team	Ducati	28	+9.905	7	20
3	1	(Australia) Casey Stoner	Repsol Honda Team	Honda	28	+11.298	2	16
4	26	(Spain) Dani Pedrosa	Repsol Honda Team	Honda	28	+29.361	1	13
5	6	(Germany) Stefan Bradl	LCR Honda MotoGP	Honda	28	+32.477	13	11
6	69	(United States) Nicky Hayden	Ducati Team	Ducati	28	+32.842	11	10
7	4	(Italy) Andrea Dovizioso	Monster Yamaha Tech 3	Yamaha	28	+59.759	3	9
8	35	(United Kingdom) Cal Crutchlow	Monster Yamaha Tech 3	Yamaha	28	+1:05.152	5	8
9	8	(Spain) Héctor Barberá	Pramac Racing Team	Ducati	28	+1:07.846	9	7
10	19	(Spain) Álvaro Bautista	San Carlo Honda Gresini	Honda	28	+1:13.193	8	6
11	77	(United Kingdom) James Ellison	Paul Bird Motorsport	ART	28	+1:26.663	16	5
12	54	(Italy) Mattia Pasini	Speed Master	ART	28	+1:27.633	20	4
13	41	(Spain) Aleix Espargaró	Power Electronics Aspar	ART	27	+1 lap	17	3
14	51	(Italy) Michele Pirro	San Carlo Honda Gresini	FTR	27	+1 lap	14	2
15	68	(Colombia) Yonny Hernández	Avintia Blusens	BQR	27	+1 lap	15	1
16	11	(United States) Ben Spies	Yamaha Factory Racing	Yamaha	27	+1 lap	6	
17	7	(Australia) Chris Vermeulen	NGM Mobile Forward Racing	Suter	26	+2 laps	21	
18	22	(Spain) Iván Silva	Avintia Blusens	BQR	26	+2 laps	19	
Ret	9	(Italy) Danilo Petrucci	Avintia Blusens	Ioda	24	Accident	18	
Ret	14	(France) Randy de Puniet	Power Electronics Aspar	ART	22	Accident	12	
Ret	17	(Czech Republic) Karel Abraham	Cardion AB Motoracing	Ducati	11	Retirement	10	

=== Moto2 ===
Pos.	No.	Rider	Manufacturer	Laps	Time/Retired	Grid	Points
1	12	(Switzerland) Thomas Lüthi	Suter	26	50:02.816	2	25
2	71	(Italy) Claudio Corti	Kalex	26	+6.354	9	20
3	45	(United Kingdom) Scott Redding	Kalex	26	+12.162	4	16
4	29	(Italy) Andrea Iannone	Speed Up	26	+16.338	5	13
5	36	(Finland) Mika Kallio	Kalex	26	+19.278	6	11
6	40	(Spain) Pol Espargaró	Kalex	26	+20.874	3	10
7	76	(Germany) Max Neukirchner	Kalex	26	+28.117	26	9
8	14	(Thailand) Ratthapark Wilairot	Suter	26	+38.317	28	8
9	38	(United Kingdom) Bradley Smith	Tech 3	26	+40.940	19	7
10	80	(Spain) Esteve Rabat	Kalex	26	+44.077	18	6
11	24	(Spain) Toni Elías	Suter	26	+59.583	10	5
12	60	(Spain) Julián Simón	Suter	26	+1:01.785	11	4
13	18	(Spain) Nicolás Terol	Suter	26	+1:03.430	17	3
14	77	(Switzerland) Dominique Aegerter	Suter	26	+1:10.341	12	2
15	44	(Italy) Roberto Rolfo	Suter	26	+1:22.145	21	1
16	49	(Spain) Axel Pons	Kalex	26	+1:46.994	16	
17	72	(Japan) Yuki Takahashi	Suter	25	+1 lap	20	
18	10	(Switzerland) Marco Colandrea	FTR	25	+1 lap	31	
DSQ	95	(Australia) Anthony West	Moriwaki	26	(+21.705)	27	
Ret	5	(France) Johann Zarco	Motobi	21	Accident	8	
Ret	82	(Spain) Elena Rosell	Moriwaki	18	Accident	30	
Ret	30	(Japan) Takaaki Nakagami	Kalex	17	Accident	24	
Ret	63	(France) Mike Di Meglio	Speed Up	16	Accident	22	
Ret	88	(Spain) Ricard Cardús	AJR	13	Accident	15	
Ret	93	(Spain) Marc Márquez	Suter	11	Retirement	1	
Ret	8	(United Kingdom) Gino Rea	Suter	7	Accident	23	
Ret	7	(Sweden) Alexander Lundh	MZ-RE Honda	7	Retirement	25	
Ret	15	(San Marino) Alex de Angelis	Suter	3	Accident	7	
Ret	47	(Spain) Ángel Rodríguez	Bimota	2	Accident	29	
Ret	3	(Italy) Simone Corsi	FTR	2	Retirement	14	
Ret	4	(Switzerland) Randy Krummenacher	Kalex	1	Retirement	13	
DNS	19	(Belgium) Xavier Siméon	Tech 3				
OFFICIAL MOTO2 REPORT

=== Moto3 ===
Pos.	No.	Rider	Manufacturer	Laps	Time/Retired	Grid	Points
1	96	(France) Louis Rossi	FTR Honda	24	49:12.390	15	25
2	23	(Spain) Alberto Moncayo	Kalex KTM	24	+27.348	7	20
3	42	(Spain) Álex Rins	Suter Honda	24	+28.899	26	16
4	27	(Italy) Niccolò Antonelli	FTR Honda	24	+33.195	27	13
5	61	(Australia) Arthur Sissis	KTM	24	+36.989	14	11
6	11	(Germany) Sandro Cortese	KTM	24	+45.312	6	10
7	53	(Netherlands) Jasper Iwema	FGR Honda	24	+58.645	25	9
8	89	(France) Alan Techer	TSR Honda	24	+1:05.022	18	8
9	21	(Spain) Iván Moreno	FTR Honda	24	+1:09.194	29	7
10	30	(Switzerland) Giulian Pedone	Suter Honda	24	+1:45.751	19	6
11	94	(Germany) Jonas Folger	Ioda	23	+1 lap	11	5
12	77	(Germany) Marcel Schrötter	Mahindra	23	+1 lap	32	4
13	86	(Germany) Kevin Hanus	Honda	23	+1 lap	30	3
14	19	(Italy) Alessandro Tonucci	FTR Honda	22	+2 laps	23	2
15	31	(Finland) Niklas Ajo	KTM	20	+4 laps	13	1
Ret	63	(Malaysia) Zulfahmi Khairuddin	KTM	17	Accident	10	
Ret	25	(Spain) Maverick Viñales	FTR Honda	16	Accident	1	
Ret	44	(Portugal) Miguel Oliveira	Suter Honda	15	Accident	3	
Ret	39	(Spain) Luis Salom	Kalex KTM	13	Accident	9	
Ret	55	(Spain) Héctor Faubel	Kalex KTM	12	Accident	8	
Ret	84	(Czech Republic) Jakub Kornfeil	FTR Honda	12	Accident	4	
Ret	32	(Spain) Isaac Viñales	FTR Honda	12	Accident	20	
Ret	26	(Spain) Adrián Martín	FTR Honda	8	Accident	12	
Ret	8	(Australia) Jack Miller	Honda	8	Retirement	22	
Ret	15	(Italy) Simone Grotzkyj	Suter Honda	7	Accident	24	
Ret	99	(United Kingdom) Danny Webb	Mahindra	7	Retirement	31	
Ret	52	(United Kingdom) Danny Kent	KTM	5	Accident	17	
Ret	5	(Italy) Romano Fenati	FTR Honda	2	Accident	21	
Ret	10	(France) Alexis Masbou	Honda	1	Accident	5	
Ret	51	(Japan) Kenta Fujii	TSR Honda	1	Accident	28	
Ret	41	(South Africa) Brad Binder	Kalex KTM	0	Accident	16	
Ret	3	(Italy) Luigi Morciano	Ioda	0	Retirement	33	
DNS	7	(Spain) Efrén Vázquez	FTR Honda			2	
DNS	9	(Germany) Toni Finsterbusch	Honda				
OFFICIAL MOTO3 REPORT

== Championship standings after the race (MotoGP) ==
Below are the standings for the top five riders and constructors after round four has concluded.

Riders' Championship standings

Pos.	Rider	Points
1	(Spain) Jorge Lorenzo	90
2	(Australia) Casey Stoner	82
3	(Spain) Dani Pedrosa	65
4	(United Kingdom) Cal Crutchlow	45
5	(Italy) Andrea Dovizioso	44

Constructors' Championship standings

Pos.	Constructor	Points
1	(Japan) Yamaha	90
2	(Japan) Honda	86
3	(Italy) Ducati	47
4	(Italy) ART	16
5	(Switzerland) Suter	4

- Note: Only the top five positions are included for both sets of standings.

Previous race: 2012 Portuguese Grand Prix	FIM Grand Prix World Championship; 2012 season	Next race: 2012 Catalan Grand Prix
Previous race: 2011 French Grand Prix	French motorcycle Grand Prix	Next race: 2013 French Grand Prix
