= Catalan motorcycle Grand Prix =

Motorcycling event in Barcelona, Spain

Coordinates: 41°34′9.9″N 2°15′26.9″E

Catalan Grand Prix

Grand Prix motorcycle racing
- Venue: Circuit de Barcelona-Catalunya (1996–present)
- First race: 1996
- Most wins (rider): Valentino Rossi (10)
- Most wins (manufacturer): Honda (23)

The Catalan motorcycle Grand Prix is a motorcycling event held at the Circuit de Barcelona-Catalunya in Barcelona, Catalonia, Spain, as part of the FIM Grand Prix motorcycle racing season. The event is due to take place at the Circuit de Barcelona-Catalunya until at least 2031.

== Official names and sponsors ==
- 1996–2003: Gran Premi Marlboro de Catalunya
- 2004–2005: Gran Premi Gauloises de Catalunya
- 2006–2009: Gran Premi Cinzano de Catalunya
- 2010–2013: Gran Premi Aperol de Catalunya
- 2014–2024: Gran Premi Monster Energy de Catalunya
- 2025: Monster Energy Grand Prix of Catalonia
- 2026: Monster Energy Grand Prix of Catalunya

== Winners ==
=== Multiple winners (riders) ===
# Wins	Rider	Wins	
# Wins	Rider	Category	Years won
10	(Italy) Valentino Rossi	MotoGP	2002, 2004, 2005, 2006, 2009, 2016
10	(Italy) Valentino Rossi	500cc	2001
10	(Italy) Valentino Rossi	250cc	1998, 1999
10	(Italy) Valentino Rossi	125cc	1997
6	(Spain) Jorge Lorenzo	MotoGP	2010, 2012, 2013, 2015, 2018
6	(Spain) Jorge Lorenzo	250cc	2007
4	(Spain) Álex Márquez	MotoGP	2025
4	(Spain) Álex Márquez	Moto2	2017, 2019
4	(Spain) Álex Márquez	Moto3	2014
3	(Spain) Dani Pedrosa	MotoGP	2008
3	(Spain) Dani Pedrosa	250cc	2005
3	(Spain) Dani Pedrosa	125cc	2003
3	(Spain) Marc Márquez	MotoGP	2014, 2019
3	(Spain) Marc Márquez	125cc	2010
3	(France) Fabio Quartararo	MotoGP	2020, 2022
3	(France) Fabio Quartararo	Moto2	2018
2	(Australia) Mick Doohan	500cc	1997, 1998
2	(Japan) Tomomi Manako	125cc	1996, 1998
2	(France) Randy de Puniet	250cc	2003, 2004
2	(Spain) Álvaro Bautista	250cc	2009
2	(Spain) Álvaro Bautista	125cc	2006
2	(Australia) Casey Stoner	MotoGP	2007, 2011
2	(Italy) Andrea Iannone	Moto2	2012
2	(Italy) Andrea Iannone	125cc	2009
2	(France) Johann Zarco	Moto2	2015, 2016
2	(Colombia) David Alonso	Moto3	2023, 2024
2	(Brazil) Eric Granado	MotoE	2025 Race 1, 2025 Race 2

=== Multiple winners (manufacturers) ===
# Wins	Manufacturer	Wins	
# Wins	Manufacturer	Category	Years won
23	(Japan) Honda	MotoGP	2002, 2008, 2011, 2014, 2019
23	(Japan) Honda	500cc	1996, 1997, 1998, 1999, 2001
23	(Japan) Honda	250cc	1997, 2001, 2005, 2006
23	(Japan) Honda	Moto3	2014, 2015, 2016, 2017, 2018, 2019
23	(Japan) Honda	125cc	1996, 1998, 2003
18	(Italy) Aprilia	MotoGP	2023
18	(Italy) Aprilia	250cc	1996, 1998, 1999, 2002, 2003, 2004, 2007, 2009
18	(Italy) Aprilia	125cc	1997, 1999, 2000, 2001, 2004, 2005, 2006, 2009, 2011
13	(Germany) Kalex	Moto2	2011, 2013, 2014, 2015, 2016, 2017, 2019, 2020, 2021, 2022, 2023, 2025, 2026
13	(Italy) Ducati	MotoGP	2003, 2007, 2017, 2018, 2024, 2025, 2026
13	(Italy) Ducati	MotoE	2023 Race 1, 2023 Race 2, 2024 Race 1, 2024 Race 2, 2025 Race 1, 2025 Race 2
12	(Japan) Yamaha	MotoGP	2004, 2005, 2006, 2009, 2010, 2012, 2013, 2015, 2016, 2020, 2022
12	(Japan) Yamaha	250cc	2000
6	(Austria) KTM	MotoGP	2021
6	(Austria) KTM	Moto3	2013, 2020, 2025, 2026
6	(Austria) KTM	125cc	2007
3	(Spain) GasGas	Moto3	2021, 2022, 2023
2	(Italy) Gilera	250cc	2008
2	(Italy) Gilera	125cc	2002
2	(Spain) Derbi	125cc	2008, 2010
2	(Italy) Speed Up	Moto2	2012, 2018

=== By year ===
A pink background indicates an event that was not part of the Grand Prix motorcycle racing championship.

Year	Track	Moto3		Moto2		MotoGP		Report
Year	Track	Rider	Manufacturer	Rider	Manufacturer	Rider	Manufacturer	Report
2026	Catalunya	(Spain) Máximo Quiles	KTM	(Spain) Manuel González	Kalex	(Italy) Fabio Di Giannantonio	Ducati	Report

Year	Track	MotoE				Moto3		Moto2		MotoGP		Report
Year	Track	Race 1		Race 2		Moto3		Moto2		MotoGP		Report
Year	Track	Rider	Manufacturer	Rider	Manufacturer	Rider	Manufacturer	Rider	Manufacturer	Rider	Manufacturer	Report
2025	Catalunya	(Brazil) Eric Granado	Ducati	(Brazil) Eric Granado	Ducati	(Spain) Ángel Piqueras	KTM	(Spain) Daniel Holgado	Kalex	(Spain) Álex Márquez	Ducati	Report
2024	Catalunya	(Spain) Oscar Gutiérrez	Ducati	(Italy) Kevin Zannoni	Ducati	(Colombia) David Alonso	CFMoto	(Japan) Ai Ogura	Boscoscuro	(Italy) Francesco Bagnaia	Ducati	Report
2023	Catalunya	(Italy) Andrea Mantovani	Ducati	(Italy) Mattia Casadei	Ducati	(Colombia) David Alonso	GasGas	(United Kingdom) Jake Dixon	Kalex	(Spain) Aleix Espargaró	Aprilia	Report

Year	Track	Moto3		Moto2		MotoGP		Report
Year	Track	Rider	Manufacturer	Rider	Manufacturer	Rider	Manufacturer	Report
2022	Catalunya	(Spain) Izan Guevara	GasGas	(Italy) Celestino Vietti	Kalex	(France) Fabio Quartararo	Yamaha	Report

Year	Track	MotoE		Moto3		Moto2		MotoGP		Report
Year	Track	Rider	Manufacturer	Rider	Manufacturer	Rider	Manufacturer	Rider	Manufacturer	Report
2021	Catalunya	(Spain) Miquel Pons	Energica	(Spain) Sergio García	GasGas	(Australia) Remy Gardner	Kalex	(Portugal) Miguel Oliveira	KTM	Report

Year	Track	Moto3		Moto2		MotoGP		Report
Year	Track	Rider	Manufacturer	Rider	Manufacturer	Rider	Manufacturer	Report
2020	Catalunya	(South Africa) Darryn Binder	KTM	(Italy) Luca Marini	Kalex	(France) Fabio Quartararo	Yamaha	Report
2019	Catalunya	(Spain) Marcos Ramírez	Honda	(Spain) Álex Márquez	Kalex	(Spain) Marc Márquez	Honda	Report
2018	Catalunya	(Italy) Enea Bastianini	Honda	(France) Fabio Quartararo	Speed Up	(Spain) Jorge Lorenzo	Ducati	Report
2017	Catalunya	(Spain) Joan Mir	Honda	(Spain) Álex Márquez	Kalex	(Italy) Andrea Dovizioso	Ducati	Report
2016	Catalunya	(Spain) Jorge Navarro	Honda	(France) Johann Zarco	Kalex	(Italy) Valentino Rossi	Yamaha	Report
2015	Catalunya	(United Kingdom) Danny Kent	Honda	(France) Johann Zarco	Kalex	(Spain) Jorge Lorenzo	Yamaha	Report
2014	Catalunya	(Spain) Álex Márquez	Honda	(Spain) Esteve Rabat	Kalex	(Spain) Marc Márquez	Honda	Report
2013	Catalunya	(Spain) Luis Salom	KTM	(Spain) Pol Espargaró	Kalex	(Spain) Jorge Lorenzo	Yamaha	Report
2012	Catalunya	(Spain) Maverick Viñales	FTR Honda	(Italy) Andrea Iannone	Speed Up	(Spain) Jorge Lorenzo	Yamaha	Report
Year	Track	125cc		Moto2		MotoGP		Report
Year	Track	Rider	Manufacturer	Rider	Manufacturer	Rider	Manufacturer	Report
2011	Catalunya	(Spain) Nicolás Terol	Aprilia	(Germany) Stefan Bradl	Kalex	(Australia) Casey Stoner	Honda	Report
2010	Catalunya	(Spain) Marc Márquez	Derbi	(Japan) Yuki Takahashi	Tech 3	(Spain) Jorge Lorenzo	Yamaha	Report
Year	Track	125cc		250cc		MotoGP		Report
Year	Track	Rider	Manufacturer	Rider	Manufacturer	Rider	Manufacturer	Report
2009	Catalunya	(Italy) Andrea Iannone	Aprilia	(Spain) Álvaro Bautista	Aprilia	(Italy) Valentino Rossi	Yamaha	Report
2008	Catalunya	(France) Mike Di Meglio	Derbi	(Italy) Marco Simoncelli	Gilera	(Spain) Dani Pedrosa	Honda	Report
2007	Catalunya	(Japan) Tomoyoshi Koyama	KTM	(Spain) Jorge Lorenzo	Aprilia	(Australia) Casey Stoner	Ducati	Report
2006	Catalunya	(Spain) Álvaro Bautista	Aprilia	(Italy) Andrea Dovizioso	Honda	(Italy) Valentino Rossi	Yamaha	Report
2005	Catalunya	(Italy) Mattia Pasini	Aprilia	(Spain) Daniel Pedrosa	Honda	(Italy) Valentino Rossi	Yamaha	Report
2004	Catalunya	(Spain) Héctor Barberá	Aprilia	(France) Randy de Puniet	Aprilia	(Italy) Valentino Rossi	Yamaha	Report
2003	Catalunya	(Spain) Daniel Pedrosa	Honda	(France) Randy de Puniet	Aprilia	(Italy) Loris Capirossi	Ducati	Report
2002	Catalunya	(San Marino) Manuel Poggiali	Gilera	(Italy) Marco Melandri	Aprilia	(Italy) Valentino Rossi	Honda	Report
Year	Track	125cc		250cc		500cc		Report
Year	Track	Rider	Manufacturer	Rider	Manufacturer	Rider	Manufacturer	Report
2001	Catalunya	(Italy) Lucio Cecchinello	Aprilia	(Japan) Daijiro Kato	Honda	(Italy) Valentino Rossi	Honda	Report
2000	Catalunya	(Italy) Simone Sanna	Aprilia	(France) Olivier Jacque	Yamaha	(United States) Kenny Roberts Jr.	Suzuki	Report
1999	Catalunya	(France) Arnaud Vincent	Aprilia	(Italy) Valentino Rossi	Aprilia	(Spain) Àlex Crivillé	Honda	Report
1998	Catalunya	(Japan) Tomomi Manako	Honda	(Italy) Valentino Rossi	Aprilia	(Australia) Mick Doohan	Honda	Report
1997	Catalunya	(Italy) Valentino Rossi	Aprilia	(Germany) Ralf Waldmann	Honda	(Australia) Mick Doohan	Honda	Report
1996	Catalunya	(Japan) Tomomi Manako	Honda	(Italy) Max Biaggi	Aprilia	(Spain) Carlos Checa	Honda	Report
