= 2012 British motorcycle Grand Prix =

(United Kingdom) 2012 British Grand Prix
Race details
- Race 6 of 18 races in the 2012 Grand Prix motorcycle racing season
- Date: 17 June 2012
- Official name: Hertz British Grand Prix
- Location: Silverstone Circuit
- Course: Permanent racing facility; 5.900 km (3.666 mi)

MotoGP
Pole position
Rider	(Spain) Álvaro Bautista	Honda
Time	2:03.303	
Fastest lap
Rider	(Spain) Jorge Lorenzo	Yamaha
Time	2:02.888	
Podium
First	(Spain) Jorge Lorenzo	Yamaha
Second	(Australia) Casey Stoner	Honda
Third	(Spain) Dani Pedrosa	Honda

Moto2
Pole position
Rider	(Spain) Pol Espargaró	Kalex
Time	2:08.111	
Fastest lap
Rider	(Switzerland) Thomas Lüthi	Suter
Time	2:07.667	
Podium
First	(Spain) Pol Espargaró	Kalex
Second	(United Kingdom) Scott Redding	Kalex
Third	(Spain) Marc Márquez	Suter

Moto3
Pole position
Rider	(Spain) Maverick Viñales	FTR Honda
Time	2:16.187	
Fastest lap
Rider	(Germany) Sandro Cortese	KTM
Time	2:16.055	
Podium
First	(Spain) Maverick Viñales	FTR Honda
Second	(Spain) Luis Salom	Kalex KTM
Third	(Germany) Sandro Cortese	KTM

The 2012 British motorcycle Grand Prix was the sixth round of the 2012 Grand Prix motorcycle racing season. It took place on the weekend of 15–17 June 2012 at Silverstone in Northamptonshire, England. In qualifying for MotoGP, Álvaro Bautista took the first pole position of his career.

== Classification ==
=== MotoGP ===
Pos.	No.	Rider	Team	Manufacturer	Laps	Time/Retired	Grid	Points
1	99	(Spain) Jorge Lorenzo	Yamaha Factory Racing	Yamaha	20	41:16.429	4	25
2	1	(Australia) Casey Stoner	Repsol Honda Team	Honda	20	+3.313	3	20
3	26	(Spain) Dani Pedrosa	Repsol Honda Team	Honda	20	+3.599	5	16
4	19	(Spain) Álvaro Bautista	San Carlo Honda Gresini	Honda	20	+5.196	1	13
5	11	(United States) Ben Spies	Yamaha Factory Racing	Yamaha	20	+11.531	2	11
6	35	(United Kingdom) Cal Crutchlow	Monster Yamaha Tech 3	Yamaha	20	+15.112	20	10
7	69	(United States) Nicky Hayden	Ducati Team	Ducati	20	+15.527	7	9
8	6	(Germany) Stefan Bradl	LCR Honda MotoGP	Honda	20	+22.521	9	8
9	46	(Italy) Valentino Rossi	Ducati Team	Ducati	20	+36.138	10	7
10	8	(Spain) Héctor Barberá	Pramac Racing Team	Ducati	20	+41.328	6	6
11	41	(Spain) Aleix Espargaró	Power Electronics Aspar	ART	20	+1:03.157	11	5
12	14	(France) Randy de Puniet	Power Electronics Aspar	ART	20	+1:03.443	12	4
13	51	(Italy) Michele Pirro	San Carlo Honda Gresini	FTR	20	+1:07.290	14	3
14	77	(United Kingdom) James Ellison	Paul Bird Motorsport	ART	20	+1:14.782	17	2
15	68	(Colombia) Yonny Hernández	Avintia Blusens	BQR	20	+1:15.108	13	1
16	5	(United States) Colin Edwards	NGM Mobile Forward Racing	Suter	20	+1:29.899	15	
17	9	(Italy) Danilo Petrucci	Came IodaRacing Project	Ioda	20	+1:40.302	18	
18	22	(Spain) Iván Silva	Avintia Blusens	BQR	20	+1:52.099	19	
19	4	(Italy) Andrea Dovizioso	Monster Yamaha Tech 3	Yamaha	19	+1 lap	8	
Ret	54	(Italy) Mattia Pasini	Speed Master	ART	14	Retirement	16	
WD	17	(Czech Republic) Karel Abraham	Cardion AB Motoracing	Ducati		Injured		

=== Moto2 ===
Pos.	No.	Rider	Manufacturer	Laps	Time/Retired	Grid	Points
1	40	(Spain) Pol Espargaró	Kalex	18	38:29.792	1	25
2	45	(United Kingdom) Scott Redding	Kalex	18	+1.462	3	20
3	93	(Spain) Marc Márquez	Suter	18	+1.521	5	16
4	29	(Italy) Andrea Iannone	Speed Up	18	+2.851	2	13
5	3	(Italy) Simone Corsi	FTR	18	+3.803	10	11
6	71	(Italy) Claudio Corti	Kalex	18	+7.109	6	10
7	38	(United Kingdom) Bradley Smith	Tech 3	18	+7.627	4	9
8	12	(Switzerland) Thomas Lüthi	Suter	18	+7.669	7	8
9	77	(Switzerland) Dominique Aegerter	Suter	18	+15.847	11	7
10	36	(Finland) Mika Kallio	Kalex	18	+20.179	18	6
11	15	(San Marino) Alex de Angelis	Suter	18	+20.450	9	5
12	24	(Spain) Toni Elías	Suter	18	+23.017	22	4
13	80	(Spain) Esteve Rabat	Kalex	18	+23.155	20	3
14	4	(Switzerland) Randy Krummenacher	Kalex	18	+23.236	12	2
15	14	(Thailand) Ratthapark Wilairot	Suter	18	+24.507	19	1
16	44	(Italy) Roberto Rolfo	Suter	18	+26.418	13	
17	76	(Germany) Max Neukirchner	Kalex	18	+28.043	16	
18	63	(France) Mike Di Meglio	Speed Up	18	+28.365	15	
19	30	(Japan) Takaaki Nakagami	Kalex	18	+28.577	17	
20	18	(Spain) Nicolás Terol	Suter	18	+36.100	27	
21	19	(Belgium) Xavier Siméon	Tech 3	18	+39.473	24	
22	60	(Spain) Julián Simón	Suter	18	+39.718	26	
23	88	(Spain) Ricard Cardús	AJR	18	+39.995	25	
24	8	(United Kingdom) Gino Rea	Suter	18	+40.493	14	
25	72	(Japan) Yuki Takahashi	Suter	18	+41.470	28	
26	47	(Spain) Ángel Rodríguez	Bimota	18	+1:02.611	23	
27	7	(Sweden) Alexander Lundh	MZ-RE Honda	18	+1:08.938	29	
28	10	(Switzerland) Marco Colandrea	FTR	18	+1:34.995	31	
29	22	(Italy) Alessandro Andreozzi	FTR	18	+1:42.775	32	
30	82	(Spain) Elena Rosell	Moriwaki	18	+1:44.102	34	
31	57	(Brazil) Eric Granado	Motobi	18	+1:58.051	33	
DSQ	95	(Australia) Anthony West	Moriwaki	18	(+1:05.324)	30	
Ret	49	(Spain) Axel Pons	Kalex	7	Accident	21	
Ret	5	(France) Johann Zarco	Motobi	1	Retirement	8	
OFFICIAL MOTO2 REPORT

=== Moto3 ===
Pos.	No.	Rider	Manufacturer	Laps	Time/Retired	Grid	Points
1	25	(Spain) Maverick Viñales	FTR Honda	17	38:55.210	1	25
2	39	(Spain) Luis Salom	Kalex KTM	17	+0.933	6	20
3	11	(Germany) Sandro Cortese	KTM	17	+1.023	4	16
4	10	(France) Alexis Masbou	Honda	17	+8.100	3	13
5	7	(Spain) Efrén Vázquez	FTR Honda	17	+8.414	2	11
6	52	(United Kingdom) Danny Kent	KTM	17	+8.637	5	10
7	5	(Italy) Romano Fenati	FTR Honda	17	+8.940	9	9
8	61	(Australia) Arthur Sissis	KTM	17	+9.046	15	8
9	63	(Malaysia) Zulfahmi Khairuddin	KTM	17	+9.208	8	7
10	44	(Portugal) Miguel Oliveira	Suter Honda	17	+15.613	11	6
11	84	(Czech Republic) Jakub Kornfeil	FTR Honda	17	+20.397	14	5
12	55	(Spain) Héctor Faubel	Kalex KTM	17	+20.559	23	4
13	27	(Italy) Niccolò Antonelli	FTR Honda	17	+21.369	13	3
14	31	(Finland) Niklas Ajo	KTM	17	+27.526	18	2
15	23	(Spain) Alberto Moncayo	Kalex KTM	17	+27.708	16	1
16	19	(Italy) Alessandro Tonucci	FTR Honda	17	+28.032	12	
17	41	(South Africa) Brad Binder	Kalex KTM	17	+35.001	26	
18	53	(Netherlands) Jasper Iwema	FGR Honda	17	+55.456	22	
19	9	(Germany) Toni Finsterbusch	Honda	17	+55.559	27	
20	15	(Italy) Simone Grotzkyj	Suter Honda	17	+55.829	25	
21	89	(France) Alan Techer	TSR Honda	17	+56.230	17	
22	21	(Spain) Iván Moreno	FTR Honda	17	+56.385	34	
23	32	(Spain) Isaac Viñales	FTR Honda	17	+1:05.383	28	
24	51	(Japan) Kenta Fujii	TSR Honda	17	+1:11.283	30	
25	3	(Italy) Luigi Morciano	Ioda	17	+1:18.155	31	
26	77	(Germany) Marcel Schrötter	Mahindra	16	+1 lap	35	
27	30	(Switzerland) Giulian Pedone	Suter Honda	16	+1 lap	32	
28	17	(United Kingdom) John McPhee	KRP Honda	15	+2 laps	29	
Ret	96	(France) Louis Rossi	FTR Honda	16	Accident	7	
Ret	79	(United Kingdom) Fraser Rogers	KRP Honda	14	Retirement	33	
Ret	99	(United Kingdom) Danny Webb	Mahindra	11	Retirement	21	
Ret	26	(Spain) Adrián Martín	FTR Honda	8	Retirement	20	
Ret	94	(Germany) Jonas Folger	Ioda	4	Retirement	19	
Ret	42	(Spain) Álex Rins	Suter Honda	1	Accident	10	
Ret	8	(Australia) Jack Miller	Honda	0	Accident	24	
OFFICIAL MOTO3 REPORT

== Championship standings after the race (MotoGP) ==
Below are the standings for the top five riders and constructors after round six has concluded.

Riders' Championship standings

Pos.	Rider	Points
1	(Spain) Jorge Lorenzo	140
2	(Australia) Casey Stoner	115
3	(Spain) Dani Pedrosa	101
4	(United Kingdom) Cal Crutchlow	66
5	(Italy) Andrea Dovizioso	60

Constructors' Championship standings

Pos.	Constructor	Points
1	(Japan) Yamaha	140
2	(Japan) Honda	126
3	(Italy) Ducati	65
4	(Italy) ART	24
5	(United Kingdom) FTR	9

- Note: Only the top five positions are included for both sets of standings.

Previous race: 2012 Catalan Grand Prix	FIM Grand Prix World Championship; 2012 season	Next race: 2012 Dutch TT
Previous race: 2011 British Grand Prix	British motorcycle Grand Prix	Next race: 2013 British Grand Prix
