= Claudio Corti (motorcyclist) =

Italian motorcycle racer

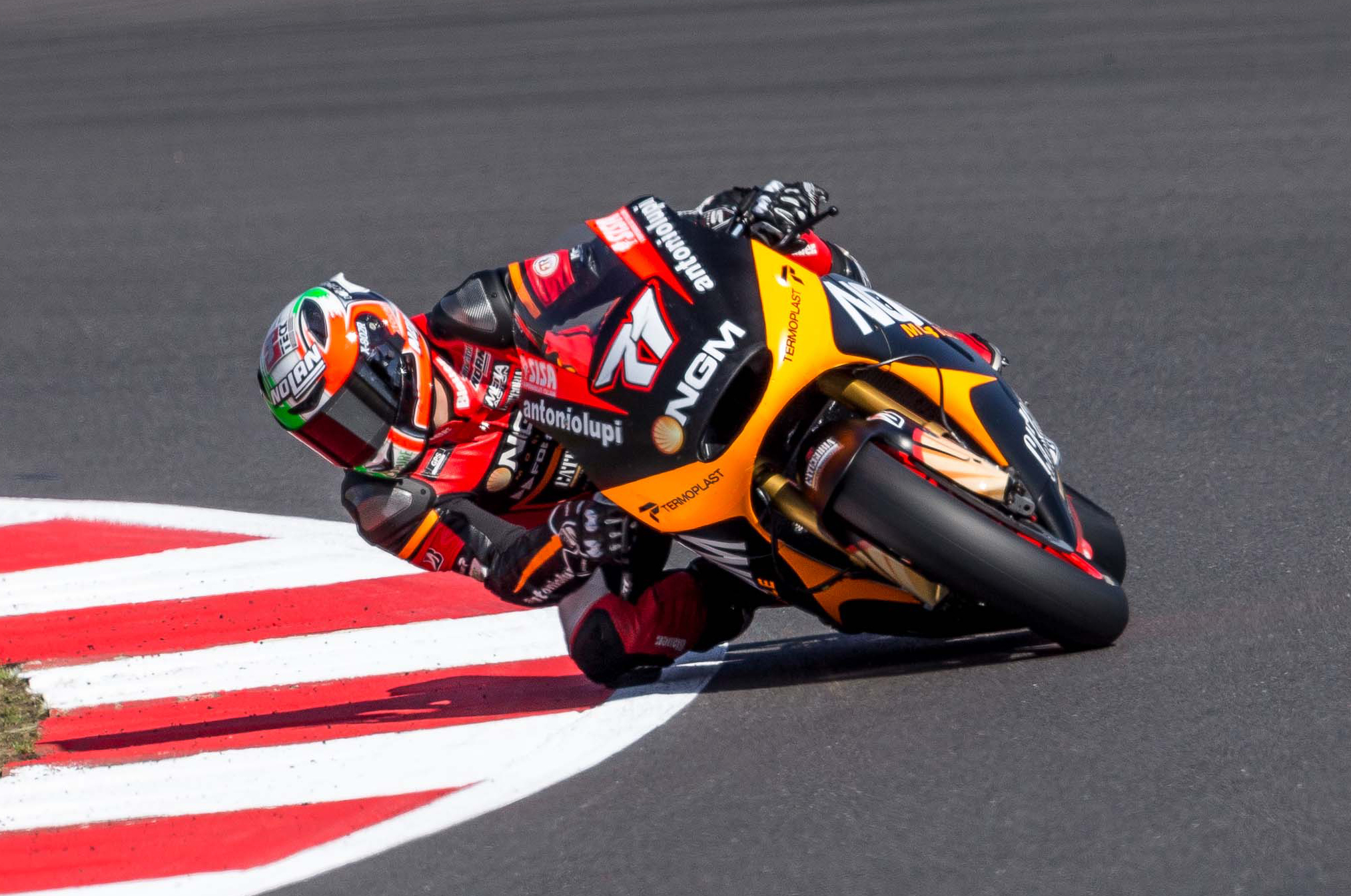
- Corti at the 2013 British Grand Prix.
- Nationality: Italian
- Born: 25 June 1987 (age 39); Como, Italy
- Current team: Stauff Quick Connect Academy
- Bike number: 71
Motorcycle racing career statistics
MotoGP World Championship
Active years	2012–2013, 2015
Manufacturers	Inmotec, FTR Kawasaki, Yamaha Forward
2015 championship position	NC (0 pts)
Starts / Wins / Podiums / Poles / F. laps / Points; 23 / 0 / 0 / 0 / 0 / 14
Moto2 World Championship
Active years	2010–2012
Manufacturers	Suter, Kalex
Championships	0
2012 championship position	14th (74 pts)
Starts / Wins / Podiums / Poles / F. laps / Points; 46 / 0 / 1 / 1 / 1 / 117
Superbike World Championship
Active years	2013–2014
Manufacturers	Kawasaki, MV Agusta
Championships	0
2014 championship position	17th (27 pts)
Starts / Wins / Podiums / Poles / F. laps / Points; 21 / 0 / 0 / 0 / 0 / 38

Claudio Corti (born 25 June 1987) is a Grand Prix motorcycle racer from Italy. He currently competes in the British National Superstock 1000 Championship aboard a Kawasaki ZX-10R.

== Career ==
=== Early career ===
Born in Como, Corti progressed up the motorcycling ladder through the Italian 125GP Championship and by 2004, he had finished as runner-up in the Italian Supersport Championship. In 2005, Corti moved into the European Superstock 600cc Cup, run on the Superbike World Championship support package. Riding for the Trasimeno team, Corti and France's Yoann Tiberio battled for the championship title, with Corti claiming the honours by eight points. He finished his first seven races on the podium, including five victories. He also competed in the Italian Supersport, Superstock and Superbike series; he twice finished as runner-up in the championship in Superstock in 2006 and 2007, and was runner-up in Superbikes in 2008.

=== Superstock 1000 FIM Cup ===
After his championship campaign in 2005, Corti moved up into the more powerful 1000cc championship for the 2006 season with Yamaha Team Italia. Four victories were a season-high for all riders, but for Corti, these were his only trips to the podium all season, as Alessandro Polita claimed the title ahead of Corti by a margin of 20 points. Corti continued with Yamaha Team Italia in 2007, and again finished as championship runner-up, this time to Niccolò Canepa, as well as holding off Matteo Baiocco for the runner-up placing.

Corti's 2008 campaign was far from successful, however, as he tumbled down the standings to end the season in eleventh place on 57 points, tying with Andrea Antonelli. But he returned to prior form in 2009, as he claimed his third runner-up placing in four seasons, riding a Suzuki for Alstare Racing. Corti won two of the first three races, but was eventually overhauled by the super-consistent placings of Xavier Simeon, who finished all ten races in the top-two. Maxime Berger's retirements from three races equally helped Corti to secure second in the championship.

=== Moto2 World Championship ===
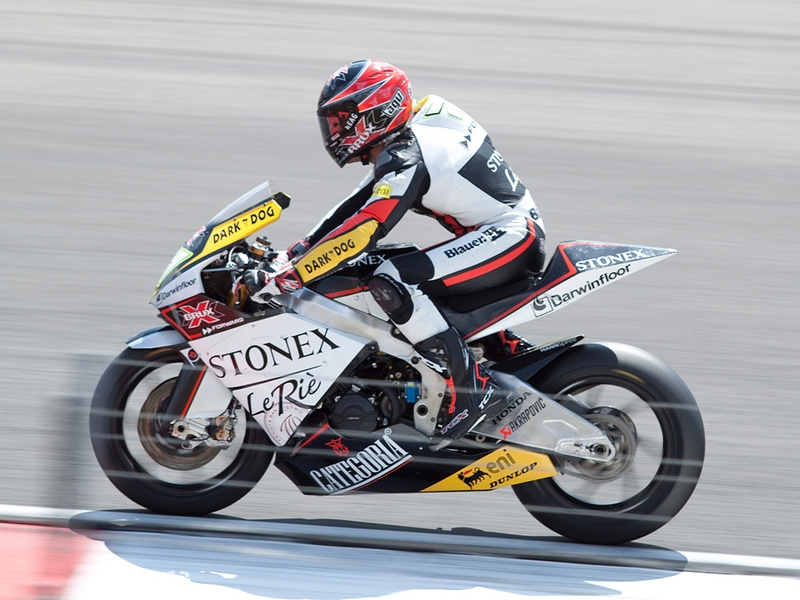
Corti at the 2010 Dutch TT.

Corti moved onto the Grand Prix bill, moving into the new-for-2010 Moto2 class. He partnered Jules Cluzel at the Forward Racing team riding Suter motorcycles. Corti was one of the few riders to finish each one of the season's 17 races, although points-scoring finishes were hard to come by due to the expansive nature of the class, with races having around 40 entries each. Corti finished 25th in the championship, with a best result of ninth in San Marino. He also claimed pole position at the British Grand Prix at Silverstone, but finished the race in 30th place.

== Career statistics ==
=== CIV Championship (Campionato Italiano Velocita) ===
==== Races by year ====
(key) (Races in bold indicate pole position; races in italics indicate fastest lap)

Year	Class	Bike	1	2	3	4	5	6	Pos	Pts
2002	125cc	Gazzanuga & Engineseng	IMO	VAL; 19	MUG; 25	MIS1; 11	MIS2; 19		24th	5
2003	125cc	Gazzaniga	MIS1; 13	MUG1; Ret	MIS1; Ret	MUG2	VAL		27th	3
2005	Supersport	Yamaha	VAL; Ret	MON; 8	IMO; 5	MIS1; 2	MUG; 6	MIS2; 9	7th	56

=== European Superstock 600 ===
==== Races by year ====
(key) (Races in bold indicate pole position, races in italics indicate fastest lap)

Year	Bike	1	2	3	4	5	6	7	8	9	10	Pos	Pts
2005	Yamaha	VAL; 2	MNZ; 1	**SIL**; 1	MIS; 1	BRN; 3	BRA; 1	**ASS**; 1	LAU; 9	IMO; 5	MAG; 9	1st	188

=== FIM Superstock 1000 Cup ===
==== Races by year ====
(key) (Races in bold indicate pole position) (Races in italics indicate fastest lap)

Year	Bike	1	2	3	4	5	6	7	8	9	10	11	Pos	Pts
2006	Yamaha	VAL; 8	MNZ; 10	**SIL**; 1	SMR; 5	BRN; 14	BRA; 4	NED; 1	**LAU**; 1	IMO; 4	**MAG**; 1		2nd	153
2007	Yamaha	DON; 2	VAL; 11	**NED**; 2	MNZ; Ret	SIL; 10	SMR; 4	BRN; 3	**BRA**; 3	LAU; 3	ITA; 1	MAG; 2	2nd	157
2008	Yamaha	VAL; 5	**NED**; Ret	**MNZ**; Ret	NŰR; 6	SMR; 12	BRN; Ret	BRA; 8	DON; Ret	MAG; 3	ALG; 8		11th	57
2009	Suzuki	VAL; 1	NED; 5	MNZ; 1	SMR; 4	DON; 2	BRN; 6	NŰR; 5	IMO; 2	MAG; 4	ALG; 2		2nd	168

=== Grand Prix motorcycle racing ===
==== By season ====
Season	Class	Motorcycle	Team	Race	Win	Podium	Pole	FLap	Pts	Plcd
2010	Moto2	Suter	Forward Racing	17	0	0	1	0	20	25th
2011	Moto2	Suter	Italtrans Racing Team	16	0	0	0	0	23	25th
2012	Moto2	Kalex	Italtrans Racing Team	13	0	1	0	1	74	14th
2012	MotoGP	Inmotec	Avintia Blusens	1	0	0	0	0	0	NC
2013	MotoGP	FTR Kawasaki	NGM Mobile Forward Racing	18	0	0	0	0	14	19th
2015	MotoGP	Yamaha Forward	Forward Racing	4	0	0	0	0	0	NC
Total				**69**	**0**	**1**	**1**	**1**	**131**	

==== By class ====
Class	Seasons	1st GP	1st Pod	1st Win	Race	Win	Podiums	Pole	FLap	Pts	WChmp
Moto2	2010–2012	2010 Qatar	2012 France		46	0	1	1	1	117	0
MotoGP	2012–2013, 2015	2012 Valencia			23	0	0	0	0	14	0

==== Races by year ====
(key) (Races in bold indicate pole position)

Year	Class	Bike	1	2	3	4	5	6	7	8	9	10	11	12	13	14	15	16	17	18	Pos.	Pts
2010	Moto2	Suter	QAT; 20	SPA; 18	FRA; 15	ITA; 22	**GBR**; 30	NED; 17	CAT; 22	GER; 22	CZE; 26	INP; 13	RSM; 9	ARA; 11	JPN; 14	MAL; 15	AUS; 15	POR; 19	VAL; 19		25th	20
2011	Moto2	Suter	QAT; 21	SPA; 21	POR; 11	FRA; 22	CAT; 17	GBR; Ret	NED; 15	ITA; 23	GER; 15	CZE; 14	INP; 22	RSM; 18	ARA; 19	JPN	AUS; 4	MAL; Ret	VAL; 15		25th	23
2012	Moto2	Kalex	QAT; 16	SPA; 6	POR; 14	FRA; 2	CAT; 13	GBR; 6	NED; 16	GER; 9	ITA; 9		INP; 10	CZE; Ret	RSM; 14	ARA; 9	JPN	MAL	AUS		14th	74
2012	MotoGP	Inmotec										USA								VAL; Ret	NC	0
2013	MotoGP	FTR Kawasaki	QAT; 16	AME; 19	SPA; 17	FRA; Ret	ITA; Ret	CAT; 12	NED; 18	GER; 15	USA; Ret	INP; 14	CZE; Ret	GBR; 17	RSM; 16	ARA; 15	MAL; 13	AUS; 17	JPN; 20	VAL; 13	19th	14
2015	MotoGP	Yamaha Forward	QAT	AME	ARG	SPA	FRA	ITA	CAT	NED	GER; Ret	INP	CZE; 20	GBR; 18	RSM; 20	ARA	JPN	AUS	MAL	VAL	NC	0

=== Superbike World Championship ===
==== Races by year ====
Year	Make	1		2		3		4		5		6		7		8		9		10		11		12		13		14		Pos.	Pts
Year	Make	R1	R2	R1	R2	R1	R2	R1	R2	R1	R2	R1	R2	R1	R2	R1	R2	R1	R2	R1	R2	R1	R2	R1	R2	R1	R2	R1	R2	Pos.	Pts
2012	Kawasaki	AUS	AUS	ITA	ITA	NED	NED	ITA	ITA	EUR	EUR	USA	USA	SMR	SMR	SPA	SPA	CZE	CZE	GBR	GBR	RUS	RUS	GER	GER	POR	POR	FRA; 9	FRA; 12	24th	11
2014	MV Agusta	AUS; 13	AUS; 18	SPA; Ret	SPA; Ret	NED; 14	NED; Ret	ITA; 18	ITA; Ret	GBR; 15	GBR; 12	MAL; Ret	MAL; DNS	SMR; 13	SMR; 17	POR; DNS	POR; DNS	USA	USA	SPA; 15	SPA; Ret	FRA; 13	FRA; 8	QAT; Ret	QAT; 14					17th	27

=== British Superbike Championship ===
Year	Bike	1		2		3			4		5		6		7		8		9			10		11		12			Pos	Pts
Year	Bike	R1	R2	R1	R2	R1	R2	R3	R1	R2	R1	R2	R1	R2	R1	R2	R1	R2	R1	R2	R3	R1	R2	R1	R2	R1	R2	R3	Pos	Pts
2019	Kawasaki	SIL; 8	SIL; Ret	OUL; 18	OUL; 21	DON; 14	DON; 18	DON; 13	BRH; 16	BRH; 16	KNO; Ret	KNO; 12	SNE; 15	SNE; 14	THR; 13	THR; 14	CAD; DNS	CAD; DNS	OUL; 17	OUL; 14	OUL; 13	ASS; 17	ASS; 14	DON; 15	DON; 15	BHGP; 19	BHGP; 20	BHGP; 15	20th	35

Sporting positions
Preceded by Inaugural champion	European Superstock 600; Champion; 2005	Succeeded by Xavier Siméon
