= 2012 Qatar motorcycle Grand Prix =

2012 Qatar Grand Prix
Race details
- Race 1 of 18 races in the 2012 Grand Prix motorcycle racing season
- Date: 8 April 2012
- Official name: Commercialbank Grand Prix of Qatar
- Location: Losail International Circuit
- Course: Permanent racing facility; 5.380 km (3.343 mi)

MotoGP
Pole position
Rider	(Spain) Jorge Lorenzo	Yamaha
Time	1:54.634	
Fastest lap
Rider	(Australia) Casey Stoner	Honda
Time	1:55.541	
Podium
First	(Spain) Jorge Lorenzo	Yamaha
Second	(Spain) Dani Pedrosa	Honda
Third	(Australia) Casey Stoner	Honda

Moto2
Pole position
Rider	(Switzerland) Thomas Lüthi	Suter
Time	2:00.187	
Fastest lap
Rider	(Spain) Marc Márquez	Suter
Time	2:00.645	
Podium
First	(Spain) Marc Márquez	Suter
Second	(Italy) Andrea Iannone	Speed Up
Third	(Spain) Pol Espargaró	Kalex

Moto3
Pole position
Rider	(Germany) Sandro Cortese	KTM
Time	2:08.188	
Fastest lap
Rider	(Spain) Maverick Viñales	FTR Honda
Time	2:07.276	
Podium
First	(Spain) Maverick Viñales	FTR Honda
Second	(Italy) Romano Fenati	FTR Honda
Third	(Germany) Sandro Cortese	KTM

The 2012 Qatar motorcycle Grand Prix was the first round of the 2012 MotoGP season. It was held at the Losail International Circuit near Doha in Qatar on 8 April 2012. It was contested over twenty-two laps.

This race saw the début of the 1000cc engine motorcycles introduced in the MotoGP class for this season and also the début of the Honda RC213V, replacing the 800cc engines and the Honda RC212V that were used between 2007 and 2011, and also the début of the 125cc 2-stroke replacement class, Moto3, which are powered by 250cc (15.2 cu in) 4-stroke engines.

== Classification ==
=== MotoGP ===
Pos.	No.	Rider	Team	Manufacturer	Laps	Time	Grid	Points
1	99	(Spain) Jorge Lorenzo	Yamaha Factory Racing	Yamaha	22	42:44.214	1	25
2	26	(Spain) Dani Pedrosa	Repsol Honda Team	Honda	22	+0.852	7	20
3	1	(Australia) Casey Stoner	Repsol Honda Team	Honda	22	+2.908	2	16
4	35	(United Kingdom) Cal Crutchlow	Monster Yamaha Tech 3	Yamaha	22	+17.114	3	13
5	4	(Italy) Andrea Dovizioso	Monster Yamaha Tech 3	Yamaha	22	+17.420	6	11
6	69	(United States) Nicky Hayden	Ducati Team	Ducati	22	+28.413	5	10
7	19	(Spain) Álvaro Bautista	San Carlo Honda Gresini	Honda	22	+28.446	11	9
8	6	(Germany) Stefan Bradl	LCR Honda MotoGP	Honda	22	+29.464	9	8
9	8	(Spain) Héctor Barberá	Pramac Racing Team	Ducati	22	+31.384	8	7
10	46	(Italy) Valentino Rossi	Ducati Team	Ducati	22	+33.665	12	6
11	11	(United States) Ben Spies	Yamaha Factory Racing	Yamaha	22	+56.907	4	5
12	5	(United States) Colin Edwards	NGM Mobile Forward Racing	Suter	22	+58.088	13	4
13	14	(France) Randy de Puniet	Power Electronics Aspar	ART	22	+1:10.650	14	3
14	68	(Colombia) Yonny Hernández	Avintia Blusens	BQR-FTR	22	+1:15.943	16	2
15	41	(Spain) Aleix Espargaró	Power Electronics Aspar	ART	22	+1:26.733	15	1
16	22	(Spain) Iván Silva	Avintia Blusens	BQR-FTR	22	+1:43.327	20	
17	54	(Italy) Mattia Pasini	Speed Master	ART	22	+1:47.419	18	
18	77	(United Kingdom) James Ellison	Paul Bird Motorsport	ART	22	+1:51.882	21	
NC	51	(Italy) Michele Pirro	San Carlo Honda Gresini	FTR	15	+7 laps	17	
Ret	9	(Italy) Danilo Petrucci	Came IodaRacing Project	Ioda	15	Retirement	19	
Ret	17	(Czech Republic) Karel Abraham	Cardion AB Motoracing	Ducati	7	Retirement	10	

=== Moto2 ===
Pos.	No.	Rider	Manufacturer	Laps	Time	Grid	Points
1	93	(Spain) Marc Márquez	Suter	20	40:34.225	2	25
2	29	(Italy) Andrea Iannone	Speed Up	20	+0.061	3	20
3	40	(Spain) Pol Espargaró	Kalex	20	+1.412	4	16
4	80	(Spain) Esteve Rabat	Kalex	20	+1.639	7	13
5	12	(Switzerland) Thomas Lüthi	Suter	20	+3.981	1	11
6	45	(United Kingdom) Scott Redding	Kalex	20	+6.768	13	10
7	63	(France) Mike Di Meglio	Speed Up	20	+6.794	5	9
8	3	(Italy) Simone Corsi	FTR	20	+6.986	10	8
9	38	(United Kingdom) Bradley Smith	Tech 3	20	+10.828	12	7
10	36	(Finland) Mika Kallio	Kalex	20	+11.379	14	6
11	4	(Switzerland) Randy Krummenacher	Kalex	20	+12.750	21	5
12	5	(France) Johann Zarco	Motobi	20	+14.121	19	4
13	24	(Spain) Toni Elías	Suter	20	+17.634	17	3
14	30	(Japan) Takaaki Nakagami	Kalex	20	+17.875	9	2
15	60	(Spain) Julián Simón	FTR	20	+17.894	11	1
16	71	(Italy) Claudio Corti	Kalex	20	+19.014	8	
17	19	(Belgium) Xavier Siméon	Tech 3	20	+19.114	18	
18	77	(Switzerland) Dominique Aegerter	Suter	20	+28.802	16	
19	72	(Japan) Yuki Takahashi	Suter	20	+36.598	25	
20	47	(Spain) Ángel Rodríguez	FTR	20	+36.738	22	
21	14	(Thailand) Ratthapark Wilairot	Moriwaki	20	+37.147	28	
22	49	(Spain) Axel Pons	Kalex	20	+37.443	24	
23	18	(Spain) Nicolás Terol	Suter	20	+39.523	26	
24	88	(Spain) Ricard Cardús	AJR	20	+45.260	23	
25	95	(Australia) Anthony West	Moriwaki	20	+53.786	29	
26	8	(United Kingdom) Gino Rea	Moriwaki	20	+54.008	27	
27	10	(Switzerland) Marco Colandrea	FTR	20	+1:19.054	31	
28	7	(Sweden) Alexander Lundh	MZ FTR	20	+1:19.071	30	
29	82	(Spain) Elena Rosell	Moriwaki	20	+1:35.150	32	
30	76	(Germany) Max Neukirchner	Kalex	19	+1 lap	6	
Ret	15	(San Marino) Alex de Angelis	Suter	18	Accident	15	
Ret	96	(Qatar) Nasser Al Malki	Moriwaki	10	Retirement	33	
Ret	44	(Italy) Roberto Rolfo	Suter	3	Retirement	20	
OFFICIAL MOTO2 REPORT

=== Moto3 ===
Pos.	No.	Rider	Manufacturer	Laps	Time	Grid	Points
1	25	(Spain) Maverick Viñales	FTR Honda	18	38:40.995	2	25
2	5	(Italy) Romano Fenati	FTR Honda	18	+4.301	6	20
3	11	(Germany) Sandro Cortese	KTM	18	+18.013	1	16
4	39	(Spain) Luis Salom	Kalex KTM	18	+18.200	4	13
5	44	(Portugal) Miguel Oliveira	Suter Honda	18	+18.745	8	11
6	63	(Malaysia) Zulfahmi Khairuddin	KTM	18	+19.052	7	10
7	61	(Australia) Arthur Sissis	KTM	18	+35.940	9	9
8	52	(United Kingdom) Danny Kent	KTM	18	+21.098	12	8
9	96	(France) Louis Rossi	FTR Honda	18	+21.153	3	7
10	42	(Spain) Álex Rins	Suter Honda	18	+28.733	13	6
11	89	(France) Alan Techer	TSR Honda	18	+29.775	18	5
12	55	(Spain) Héctor Faubel	Kalex KTM	18	+29.813	16	4
13	31	(Finland) Niklas Ajo	KTM	18	+35.940	5	3
14	23	(Spain) Alberto Moncayo	Kalex KTM	18	+35.983	14	2
15	84	(Czech Republic) Jakub Kornfeil	FTR Honda	18	+38.641	19	1
16	7	(Spain) Efrén Vázquez	Honda	18	+40.219	21	
17	27	(Italy) Niccolò Antonelli	Honda	18	+50.629	20	
18	99	(United Kingdom) Danny Webb	Mahindra	18	+54.751	25	
19	21	(Spain) Iván Moreno	FTR Honda	18	+54.989	22	
20	26	(Spain) Adrián Martín	Honda	18	+54.989	24	
21	51	(Japan) Kenta Fujii	TSR Honda	18	+1:21.239	28	
22	15	(Italy) Simone Grotzkyj	Oral	18	+1:35.791	29	
23	9	(Germany) Toni Finsterbusch	MZ-RE Honda	18	+1:41.291	31	
24	53	(Netherlands) Jasper Iwema	FGR Honda	18	+1:54.293	17	
25	8	(Australia) Jack Miller	Honda	17	+1 lap	26	
Ret	94	(Germany) Jonas Folger	Ioda	11	Retirement	32	
Ret	3	(Italy) Luigi Morciano	Ioda	7	Retirement	30	
Ret	41	(South Africa) Brad Binder	Kalex KTM	6	Retirement	15	
Ret	77	(Germany) Marcel Schrötter	Mahindra	5	Retirement	23	
Ret	10	(France) Alexis Masbou	Honda	0	Accident	10	
Ret	19	(Italy) Alessandro Tonucci	FTR Honda	0	Accident	11	
Ret	32	(Spain) Isaac Viñales	FTR Honda	0	Retirement	27	
OFFICIAL MOTO3 REPORT

== Championship standings after the race (MotoGP) ==
Below are the standings for the top five riders and constructors after round one has concluded.

Riders' Championship standings

Pos.	Rider	Points
1	(Spain) Jorge Lorenzo	25
2	(Spain) Dani Pedrosa	20
3	(Australia) Casey Stoner	16
4	(United Kingdom) Cal Crutchlow	13
5	(Italy) Andrea Dovizioso	11

Constructors' Championship standings

Pos.	Constructor	Points
1	(Japan) Yamaha	25
2	(Japan) Honda	20
3	(Italy) Ducati	10
4	(Switzerland) Suter	4
5	(Italy) ART	3

- Note: Only the top five positions are included for both sets of standings.

Previous race: 2011 Valencian Grand Prix	FIM Grand Prix World Championship; 2012 season	Next race: 2012 Spanish Grand Prix
Previous race: 2011 Qatar Grand Prix	Qatar motorcycle Grand Prix	Next race: 2013 Qatar Grand Prix
