= 2012 Portuguese motorcycle Grand Prix =

(Portugal) 2012 Portuguese Grand Prix
Race details
- Race 3 of 18 races in the 2012 Grand Prix motorcycle racing season
- Date: 6 May 2012
- Official name: Grande Prémio de Portugal Circuito Estoril
- Location: Autódromo do Estoril
- Course: Permanent racing facility; 4.182 km (2.599 mi)

MotoGP
Pole position
Rider	(Australia) Casey Stoner	Honda
Time	1:37.188	
Fastest lap
Rider	(Spain) Jorge Lorenzo	Yamaha
Time	1:36.909	
Podium
First	(Australia) Casey Stoner	Honda
Second	(Spain) Jorge Lorenzo	Yamaha
Third	(Spain) Dani Pedrosa	Honda

Moto2
Pole position
Rider	(Spain) Marc Márquez	Suter
Time	1:40.934	
Fastest lap
Rider	(Spain) Pol Espargaró	Kalex
Time	1:40.921	
Podium
First	(Spain) Marc Márquez	Suter
Second	(Spain) Pol Espargaró	Kalex
Third	(Switzerland) Thomas Lüthi	Suter

Moto3
Pole position
Rider	(Germany) Sandro Cortese	KTM
Time	1:47.145	
Fastest lap
Rider	(Germany) Sandro Cortese	KTM
Time	1:47.354	
Podium
First	(Germany) Sandro Cortese	KTM
Second	(Spain) Maverick Viñales	FTR Honda
Third	(Spain) Luis Salom	Kalex KTM

The 2012 Portuguese motorcycle Grand Prix was the third round of the 2012 Grand Prix motorcycle racing season. It took place on the weekend of 4–6 May 2012 at the Autódromo do Estoril located in Estoril, Portugal.

== Classification ==
=== MotoGP ===
Pos.	No.	Rider	Team	Manufacturer	Laps	Time/Retired	Grid	Points
1	1	(Australia) Casey Stoner	Repsol Honda Team	Honda	28	45:37.513	1	25
2	99	(Spain) Jorge Lorenzo	Yamaha Factory Racing	Yamaha	28	+1.421	4	20
3	26	(Spain) Dani Pedrosa	Repsol Honda Team	Honda	28	+3.621	2	16
4	4	(Italy) Andrea Dovizioso	Monster Yamaha Tech 3	Yamaha	28	+13.846	7	13
5	35	(United Kingdom) Cal Crutchlow	Monster Yamaha Tech 3	Yamaha	28	+16.690	3	11
6	19	(Spain) Álvaro Bautista	San Carlo Honda Gresini	Honda	28	+21.884	6	10
7	46	(Italy) Valentino Rossi	Ducati Team	Ducati	28	+26.797	9	9
8	11	(United States) Ben Spies	Yamaha Factory Racing	Yamaha	28	+33.262	5	8
9	6	(Germany) Stefan Bradl	LCR Honda MotoGP	Honda	28	+35.867	11	7
10	8	(Spain) Héctor Barberá	Pramac Racing Team	Ducati	28	+53.363	8	6
11	69	(United States) Nicky Hayden	Ducati Team	Ducati	28	+1:02.630	10	5
12	41	(Spain) Aleix Espargaró	Power Electronics Aspar	ART	28	+1:20.736	12	4
13	14	(France) Randy de Puniet	Power Electronics Aspar	ART	28	+1:23.483	14	3
14	51	(Italy) Michele Pirro	San Carlo Honda Gresini	FTR	28	+1:37.905	16	2
15	9	(Italy) Danilo Petrucci	Came IodaRacing Project	Ioda	27	+1 lap	19	1
Ret	17	(Czech Republic) Karel Abraham	Cardion AB Motoracing	Ducati	23	Retirement	13	
Ret	77	(United Kingdom) James Ellison	Paul Bird Motorsport	ART	18	Retirement	18	
Ret	68	(Colombia) Yonny Hernández	Avintia Blusens	BQR	16	Retirement	15	
Ret	54	(Italy) Mattia Pasini	Speed Master	ART	11	Retirement	17	
Ret	22	(Spain) Iván Silva	Avintia Blusens	BQR	11	Retirement	20	
DNS	5	(United States) Colin Edwards	NGM Mobile Forward Racing	Suter		Did not start		

=== Moto2 ===
Pos.	No.	Rider	Manufacturer	Laps	Time/Retired	Grid	Points
1	93	(Spain) Marc Márquez	Suter	26	44:04.086	1	25
2	40	(Spain) Pol Espargaró	Kalex	26	+1.987	5	20
3	12	(Switzerland) Thomas Lüthi	Suter	26	+2.071	2	16
4	5	(France) Johann Zarco	Motobi	26	+9.227	4	13
5	29	(Italy) Andrea Iannone	Speed Up	26	+10.481	6	11
6	15	(San Marino) Alex de Angelis	Suter	26	+21.180	9	10
7	24	(Spain) Toni Elías	Suter	26	+21.394	8	9
8	60	(Spain) Julián Simón	Suter	26	+21.504	7	8
9	36	(Finland) Mika Kallio	Kalex	26	+21.581	17	7
10	38	(United Kingdom) Bradley Smith	Tech 3	26	+24.100	13	6
11	45	(United Kingdom) Scott Redding	Kalex	26	+27.248	3	5
12	77	(Switzerland) Dominique Aegerter	Suter	26	+30.087	10	4
13	19	(Belgium) Xavier Siméon	Tech 3	26	+30.132	22	3
14	71	(Italy) Claudio Corti	Kalex	26	+30.257	21	2
15	88	(Spain) Ricard Cardús	AJR	26	+30.879	12	1
16	18	(Spain) Nicolás Terol	Suter	26	+31.097	15	
17	95	(Australia) Anthony West	Moriwaki	26	+43.099	26	
18	30	(Japan) Takaaki Nakagami	Kalex	26	+47.282	11	
19	4	(Switzerland) Randy Krummenacher	Kalex	26	+47.399	19	
20	76	(Germany) Max Neukirchner	Kalex	26	+48.143	27	
21	44	(Italy) Roberto Rolfo	Suter	26	+53.563	24	
22	47	(Spain) Ángel Rodríguez	FTR	26	+54.530	30	
23	14	(Thailand) Ratthapark Wilairot	Moriwaki	26	+55.666	28	
24	80	(Spain) Esteve Rabat	Kalex	26	+1:24.889	16	
25	7	(Sweden) Alexander Lundh	MZ-RE Honda	26	+1:32.467	29	
26	82	(Spain) Elena Rosell	Moriwaki	26	+1:40.748	31	
27	10	(Switzerland) Marco Colandrea	FTR	25	+1 lap	32	
28	8	(United Kingdom) Gino Rea	Moriwaki	25	+1 lap	25	
Ret	63	(France) Mike Di Meglio	Speed Up	20	Accident	14	
Ret	3	(Italy) Simone Corsi	FTR	19	Accident	18	
Ret	49	(Spain) Axel Pons	Kalex	11	Accident	23	
Ret	72	(Japan) Yuki Takahashi	Suter	5	Accident	20	
OFFICIAL MOTO2 REPORT

=== Moto3 ===
Pos.	No.	Rider	Manufacturer	Laps	Time	Grid	Points
1	11	(Germany) Sandro Cortese	KTM	23	41:34.536	1	25
2	25	(Spain) Maverick Viñales	FTR Honda	23	+0.055	2	20
3	39	(Spain) Luis Salom	Kalex KTM	23	+11.038	7	16
4	63	(Malaysia) Zulfahmi Khairuddin	KTM	23	+12.195	5	13
5	7	(Spain) Efrén Vázquez	FTR Honda	23	+20.934	8	11
6	27	(Italy) Niccolò Antonelli	FTR Honda	23	+20.976	12	10
7	42	(Spain) Álex Rins	Suter Honda	23	+21.792	22	9
8	52	(United Kingdom) Danny Kent	KTM	23	+21.888	4	8
9	10	(France) Alexis Masbou	Honda	23	+23.046	10	7
10	84	(Czech Republic) Jakub Kornfeil	FTR Honda	23	+23.310	11	6
11	41	(South Africa) Brad Binder	Kalex KTM	23	+23.379	14	5
12	55	(Spain) Héctor Faubel	Kalex KTM	23	+23.763	9	4
13	61	(Australia) Arthur Sissis	KTM	23	+24.308	16	3
14	23	(Spain) Alberto Moncayo	Kalex KTM	23	+25.015	17	2
15	12	(Spain) Álex Márquez	Suter Honda	23	+26.450	19	1
16	6	(Spain) Joan Olivé	KTM	23	+32.641	24	
17	89	(France) Alan Techer	TSR Honda	23	+32.743	20	
18	19	(Italy) Alessandro Tonucci	FTR Honda	23	+36.511	21	
19	77	(Germany) Marcel Schrötter	Mahindra	23	+53.527	23	
20	21	(Spain) Iván Moreno	FTR Honda	23	+1:04.014	26	
21	9	(Germany) Toni Finsterbusch	Honda	23	+1:04.064	30	
22	73	(Italy) Manuel Tatasciore	Honda	23	+1:04.071	25	
23	51	(Japan) Kenta Fujii	TSR Honda	23	+1:30.900	33	
24	3	(Italy) Luigi Morciano	Ioda	22	+1 lap	32	
25	86	(Germany) Kevin Hanus	Honda	22	+1 lap	31	
NC	80	(Italy) Armando Pontone	Ioda	23	+2:32.229	34	
NC	30	(Switzerland) Giulian Pedone	Oral	23	+2:35.705	29	
Ret	53	(Netherlands) Jasper Iwema	FGR Honda	15	Accident	28	
Ret	96	(France) Louis Rossi	FTR Honda	14	Accident	15	
Ret	5	(Italy) Romano Fenati	FTR Honda	14	Accident	6	
Ret	32	(Spain) Isaac Viñales	FTR Honda	13	Retirement	27	
Ret	99	(United Kingdom) Danny Webb	Mahindra	8	Retirement	18	
Ret	26	(Spain) Adrián Martín	FTR Honda	6	Retirement	13	
Ret	44	(Portugal) Miguel Oliveira	Suter Honda	3	Retirement	3	
DNQ	15	(Italy) Simone Grotzkyj	Oral		Food poisoning		
OFFICIAL MOTO3 REPORT

== Championship standings after the race (MotoGP) ==
Below are the standings for the top five riders and constructors after round three has concluded.

Riders' Championship standings

Pos.	Rider	Points
1	(Australia) Casey Stoner	66
2	(Spain) Jorge Lorenzo	65
3	(Spain) Dani Pedrosa	52
4	(United Kingdom) Cal Crutchlow	37
5	(Italy) Andrea Dovizioso	35

Constructors' Championship standings

Pos.	Constructor	Points
1	(Japan) Honda	70
2	(Japan) Yamaha	65
3	(Italy) Ducati	27
4	(Italy) ART	11
5	(Switzerland) Suter	4

- Note: Only the top five positions are included for both sets of standings.

Previous race: 2012 Spanish Grand Prix	FIM Grand Prix World Championship; 2012 season	Next race: 2012 French Grand Prix
Previous race: 2011 Portuguese Grand Prix	Portuguese motorcycle Grand Prix	Next race: 2020 Portuguese Grand Prix
