= 2012 Spanish motorcycle Grand Prix =

(Spain) 2012 Spanish Grand Prix
Race details
- Race 2 of 18 races in the 2012 Grand Prix motorcycle racing season
- Date: 29 April 2012
- Official name: Gran Premio bwin de España
- Location: Circuito de Jerez
- Course: Permanent racing facility; 4.423 km (2.748 mi)

MotoGP
Pole position
Rider	(Spain) Jorge Lorenzo	Yamaha
Time	1:39.532	
Fastest lap
Rider	(United Kingdom) Cal Crutchlow	Yamaha
Time	1:40.019	
Podium
First	(Australia) Casey Stoner	Honda
Second	(Spain) Jorge Lorenzo	Yamaha
Third	(Spain) Dani Pedrosa	Honda

Moto2
Pole position
Rider	(Spain) Marc Márquez	Suter
Time	1:43.005	
Fastest lap
Rider	(Switzerland) Randy Krummenacher	Kalex
Time	1:44.905	
Podium
First	(Spain) Pol Espargaró	Kalex
Second	(Spain) Marc Márquez	Suter
Third	(Switzerland) Thomas Lüthi	Suter

Moto3
Pole position
Rider	(Spain) Álex Rins	Suter Honda
Time	1:57.507	
Fastest lap
Rider	(Italy) Romano Fenati	FTR Honda
Time	1:52.774	
Podium
First	(Italy) Romano Fenati	FTR Honda
Second	(Spain) Luis Salom	Kalex KTM
Third	(Germany) Sandro Cortese	KTM

The 2012 Spanish motorcycle Grand Prix was the second round of the 2012 Grand Prix motorcycle racing season. It took place on the weekend of 27–29 April 2012 at the Circuito de Jerez, located in Jerez de la Frontera, Spain. Casey Stoner won the MotoGP race, while Pol Espargaró and Romano Fenati won the Moto2 and Moto3 races respectively.

== Classification ==
=== MotoGP ===
Pos.	No.	Rider	Team	Manufacturer	Laps	Time/Retired	Grid	Points
1	1	(Australia) Casey Stoner	Repsol Honda Team	Honda	27	45:33.897	5	25
2	99	(Spain) Jorge Lorenzo	Yamaha Factory Racing	Yamaha	27	+0.947	1	20
3	26	(Spain) Dani Pedrosa	Repsol Honda Team	Honda	27	+2.063	2	16
4	35	(United Kingdom) Cal Crutchlow	Monster Yamaha Tech 3	Yamaha	27	+2.465	4	13
5	4	(Italy) Andrea Dovizioso	Monster Yamaha Tech 3	Yamaha	27	+18.100	7	11
6	19	(Spain) Álvaro Bautista	San Carlo Honda Gresini	Honda	27	+21.395	8	10
7	6	(Germany) Stefan Bradl	LCR Honda MotoGP	Honda	27	+28.637	9	9
8	69	(United States) Nicky Hayden	Ducati Team	Ducati	27	+28.869	3	8
9	46	(Italy) Valentino Rossi	Ducati Team	Ducati	27	+34.852	13	7
10	8	(Spain) Héctor Barberá	Pramac Racing Team	Ducati	27	+35.103	12	6
11	11	(United States) Ben Spies	Yamaha Factory Racing	Yamaha	27	+38.041	6	5
12	41	(Spain) Aleix Espargaró	Power Electronics Aspar	ART	27	+1:12.728	14	4
13	9	(Italy) Danilo Petrucci	Came IodaRacing Project	Ioda	27	+1:18.669	18	3
14	54	(Italy) Mattia Pasini	Speed Master	ART	27	+1:29.142	16	2
15	22	(Spain) Iván Silva	Avintia Blusens	BQR	27	+1:31.178	19	1
16	5	(United States) Colin Edwards	NGM Mobile Forward Racing	Suter	27	+1:40.577	21	
17	17	(Czech Republic) Karel Abraham	Cardion AB Motoracing	Ducati	26	+1 lap	11	
Ret	14	(France) Randy de Puniet	Power Electronics Aspar	ART	25	Retirement	10	
Ret	77	(United Kingdom) James Ellison	Paul Bird Motorsport	ART	24	Retirement	20	
Ret	51	(Italy) Michele Pirro	San Carlo Honda Gresini	FTR	18	Retirement	15	
Ret	68	(Colombia) Yonny Hernández	Avintia Blusens	BQR	0	Retirement	17	

=== Moto2 ===
The race was red-flagged after 17 laps due to rain.

Pos.	No.	Rider	Manufacturer	Laps	Time/Retired	Grid	Points
1	40	(Spain) Pol Espargaró	Kalex	17	30:12.879	3	25
2	93	(Spain) Marc Márquez	Suter	17	+0.241	1	20
3	12	(Switzerland) Thomas Lüthi	Suter	17	+0.483	4	16
4	45	(United Kingdom) Scott Redding	Kalex	17	+4.414	12	13
5	30	(Japan) Takaaki Nakagami	Kalex	17	+4.837	2	11
6	71	(Italy) Claudio Corti	Kalex	17	+5.881	6	10
7	36	(Finland) Mika Kallio	Kalex	17	+6.149	5	9
8	77	(Switzerland) Dominique Aegerter	Suter	17	+7.097	15	8
9	24	(Spain) Toni Elías	Suter	17	+7.866	16	7
10	5	(France) Johann Zarco	Motobi	17	+8.680	10	6
11	38	(United Kingdom) Bradley Smith	Tech 3	17	+9.382	19	5
12	15	(San Marino) Alex de Angelis	Suter	17	+9.768	11	4
13	19	(Belgium) Xavier Siméon	Tech 3	17	+10.433	17	3
14	29	(Italy) Andrea Iannone	Speed Up	17	+31.366	13	2
15	8	(United Kingdom) Gino Rea	Moriwaki	17	+31.504	23	1
16	95	(Australia) Anthony West	Moriwaki	17	+34.172	29	
17	3	(Italy) Simone Corsi	FTR	17	+34.450	18	
18	49	(Spain) Axel Pons	Kalex	17	+36.410	26	
19	88	(Spain) Ricard Cardús	AJR	17	+36.803	20	
20	47	(Spain) Ángel Rodríguez	FTR	17	+37.449	24	
21	72	(Japan) Yuki Takahashi	Suter	17	+39.465	22	
22	4	(Switzerland) Randy Krummenacher	Kalex	17	+45.782	9	
23	60	(Spain) Julián Simón	Suter	17	+46.163	25	
24	7	(Sweden) Alexander Lundh	MZ-RE Honda	17	+46.251	27	
25	44	(Italy) Roberto Rolfo	Suter	17	+59.593	21	
26	14	(Thailand) Ratthapark Wilairot	Moriwaki	17	+59.987	30	
27	18	(Spain) Nicolás Terol	Suter	17	+1:01.010	28	
28	80	(Spain) Esteve Rabat	Kalex	16	+1 lap	7	
Ret	76	(Germany) Max Neukirchner	Kalex	12	Accident	14	
Ret	63	(France) Mike Di Meglio	Speed Up	8	Accident	8	
Ret	10	(Switzerland) Marco Colandrea	FTR	6	Accident	32	
Ret	82	(Spain) Elena Rosell	Moriwaki	4	Accident	31	
OFFICIAL MOTO2 REPORT

=== Moto3 ===
Pos.	No.	Rider	Manufacturer	Laps	Time/Retired	Grid	Points
1	5	(Italy) Romano Fenati	FTR Honda	23	43:50.885	10	25
2	39	(Spain) Luis Salom	Kalex KTM	23	+36.139	19	20
3	11	(Germany) Sandro Cortese	KTM	23	+36.895	2	16
4	42	(Spain) Álex Rins	Suter Honda	23	+37.061	1	13
5	10	(France) Alexis Masbou	Honda	23	+49.036	4	11
6	25	(Spain) Maverick Viñales	FTR Honda	23	+55.857	9	10
7	23	(Spain) Alberto Moncayo	Kalex KTM	23	+57.505	20	9
8	27	(Italy) Niccolò Antonelli	FTR Honda	23	+1:03.683	17	8
9	55	(Spain) Héctor Faubel	Kalex KTM	23	+1:15.351	16	7
10	63	(Malaysia) Zulfahmi Khairuddin	KTM	23	+1:35.650	28	6
11	19	(Italy) Alessandro Tonucci	FTR Honda	22	+1 lap	24	5
12	12	(Spain) Álex Márquez	Suter Honda	22	+1 lap	13	4
13	21	(Spain) Iván Moreno	FTR Honda	22	+1 lap	23	3
14	89	(France) Alan Techer	TSR Honda	22	+1 lap	34	2
15	30	(Switzerland) Giulian Pedone	Oral	22	+1 lap	33	1
16	77	(Germany) Marcel Schrötter	Mahindra	22	+1 lap	25	
17	53	(Netherlands) Jasper Iwema	FGR Honda	22	+1 lap	29	
Ret	26	(Spain) Adrián Martín	FTR Honda	15	Accident	14	
Ret	51	(Japan) Kenta Fujii	TSR Honda	15	Accident	22	
Ret	99	(United Kingdom) Danny Webb	Mahindra	14	Retirement	21	
Ret	96	(France) Louis Rossi	FTR Honda	9	Accident	12	
Ret	32	(Spain) Isaac Viñales	FTR Honda	6	Accident	7	
Ret	28	(Spain) Josep Rodríguez	FTR Honda	4	Accident	18	
Ret	44	(Portugal) Miguel Oliveira	Suter Honda	3	Accident	3	
Ret	61	(Australia) Arthur Sissis	KTM	3	Accident	8	
Ret	84	(Czech Republic) Jakub Kornfeil	FTR Honda	2	Accident	5	
Ret	41	(South Africa) Brad Binder	Kalex KTM	2	Accident	26	
Ret	7	(Spain) Efrén Vázquez	FTR Honda	2	Accident	11	
Ret	31	(Finland) Niklas Ajo	KTM	2	Accident	27	
Ret	9	(Germany) Toni Finsterbusch	MZ FTR	2	Accident	30	
Ret	3	(Italy) Luigi Morciano	Ioda	2	Accident	32	
Ret	8	(Australia) Jack Miller	Honda	0	Accident	6	
Ret	52	(United Kingdom) Danny Kent	KTM	0	Accident	15	
Ret	15	(Italy) Simone Grotzkyj	Oral	0	Accident	31	
OFFICIAL MOTO3 REPORT

== Championship standings after the race (MotoGP) ==
Below are the standings for the top five riders and constructors after round two has concluded.

Riders' Championship standings

Pos.	Rider	Points
1	(Spain) Jorge Lorenzo	45
2	(Australia) Casey Stoner	41
3	(Spain) Dani Pedrosa	36
4	(United Kingdom) Cal Crutchlow	26
5	(Italy) Andrea Dovizioso	22

Constructors' Championship standings

Pos.	Constructor	Points
1	(Japan) Honda	45
2	(Japan) Yamaha	45
3	(Italy) Ducati	18
4	(Italy) ART	7
5	(Switzerland) Suter	4

- Note: Only the top five positions are included for both sets of standings.

Previous race: 2012 Qatar Grand Prix	FIM Grand Prix World Championship; 2012 season	Next race: 2012 Portuguese Grand Prix
Previous race: 2011 Spanish Grand Prix	Spanish motorcycle Grand Prix	Next race: 2013 Spanish Grand Prix
