= 2012 MotoGP World Championship =

64th running of the MotoGP World Championship

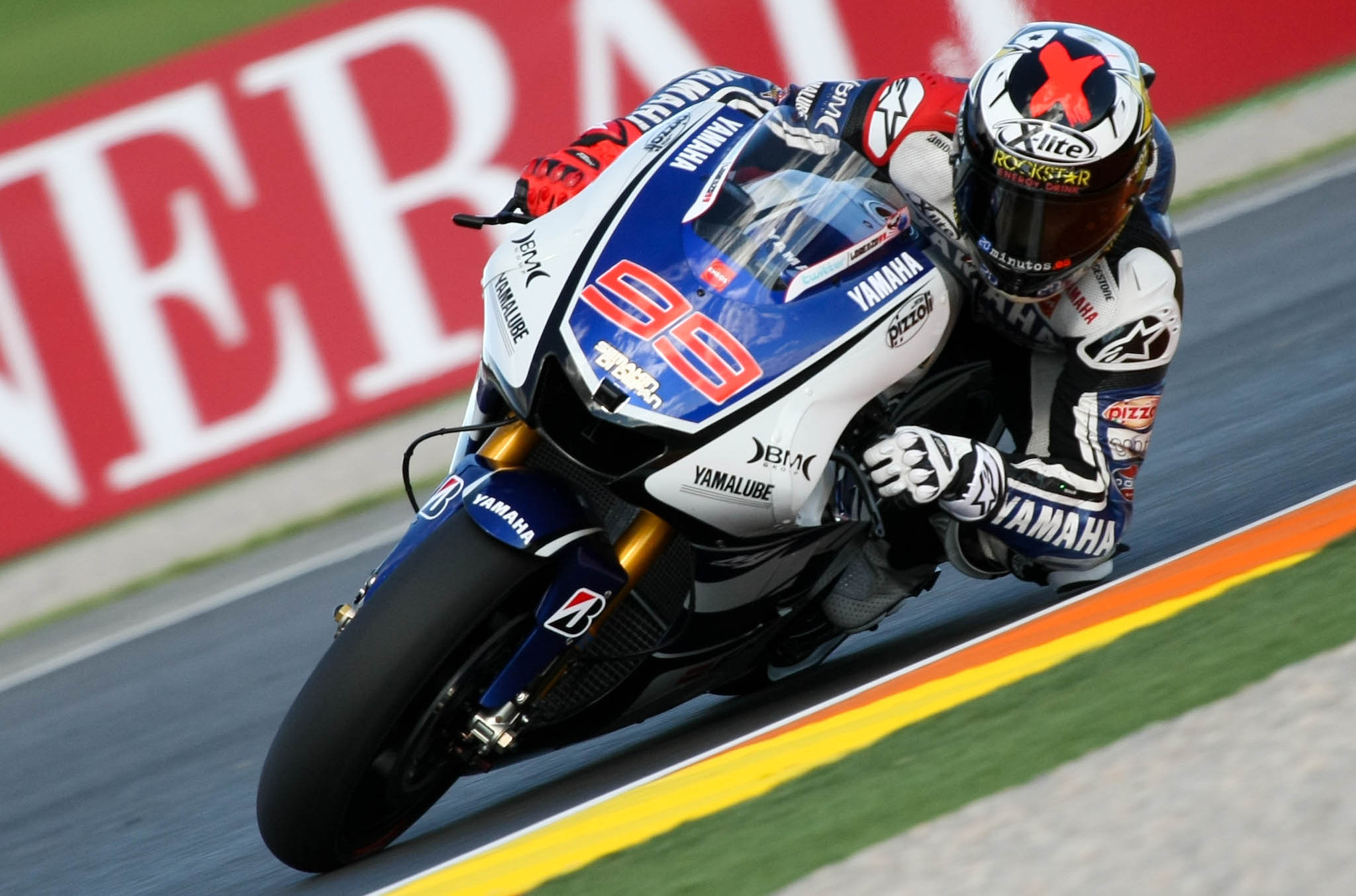
Jorge Lorenzo was the 2012 MotoGP World Riders' Champion.

The 2012 FIM MotoGP World Championship was the premier class of the 64th Fédération Internationale de Motocyclisme (FIM) Road Racing World Championship season, the highest level of competition in motorcycle road racing. Casey Stoner started the season as the defending World Champion, while Honda was the defending Manufacturers' Champion.

In the premier MotoGP class, the championship battle revolved around Yamaha rider Jorge Lorenzo and Honda pairing Dani Pedrosa and defending champion Stoner. Lorenzo won four of the first six races to be held in the campaign to open up an advantage over Stoner, before he was taken out of the Dutch TT on the first lap by Álvaro Bautista; Stoner won the race to eradicate the points lead. In the next race, Stoner crashed out of the German Grand Prix on the final lap and allowed Pedrosa to take his first win of the season. Stoner struggled in the next few races – despite a victory at the United States Grand Prix – with his championship challenge ended by a qualifying crash at Indianapolis. After ankle surgery, he returned to the series and won his final race of his career at his home race, the Australian Grand Prix, for the sixth successive season. Pedrosa went on a run of five victories in six races, with the streak being interrupted by a first-lap crash at Misano, where he was taken out by Héctor Barberá. Lorenzo finished second to Pedrosa on each occasion that he had won, and he took advantage of Pedrosa's accident to win at Misano. Lorenzo ultimately won the title with a second-place finish to Stoner in Australia, after Pedrosa had crashed out of the lead early on.

== Changes ==
=== Class changes ===
The MotoGP class saw the introduction of engines with 1,000 cc (61 cu in) in capacity, with a limit of 4 cylinders and a maximum 81 mm (3.2 in) cylinder bore.

=== Claiming Rule Teams ===
In 2012 the MotoGP class saw the introduction of Claiming Rule Teams (CRT) to allow for participation by independent teams with lower budgets. CRTs were given twelve engines per rider, six more than the other teams and more fuel – 24 litres (5.3 imperial gallons) instead of 21 litres (4.6 imperial gallons) – but were subject to a factory team buying, or "claiming", their engines for €15,000, or €20,000 with the transmission. The sport's governing body received applications from sixteen new teams looking to join the MotoGP class.

== Calendar ==
The following Grands Prix were scheduled to take place in 2012:

The Fédération Internationale de Motocyclisme released an 18-race provisional calendar on 14 September 2011. Another provisional calendar was released three months later, with the Qatar Grand Prix moved forward by a week.

Round	Date	Grand Prix	Circuit
1	8 April ‡	Commercialbank Grand Prix of Qatar	Lusail International Circuit, Lusail
2	29 April	(Spain) Gran Premio bwin de España	Circuito de Jerez, Jerez de la Frontera
3	6 May	Grande Prémio de Portugal Circuito Estoril	Circuito do Estoril, Estoril
4	20 May	Monster Energy Grand Prix de France	Bugatti Circuit, Le Mans
5	3 June	(Catalonia) Gran Premi Aperol de Catalunya	Circuit de Barcelona-Catalunya, Montmeló
6	17 June	(United Kingdom) Hertz British Grand Prix	Silverstone Circuit, Silverstone
7	30 June ††	(Netherlands) Iveco TT Assen	TT Circuit Assen, Assen
8	8 July	(Germany) eni Motorrad Grand Prix Deutschland	Sachsenring, Hohenstein-Ernstthal
9	15 July	(Italy) Gran Premio d'Italia TIM	Mugello Circuit, Scarperia e San Piero
10	29 July	(United States) Red Bull U.S. Grand Prix	Laguna Seca, Monterey
11	19 August	Red Bull Indianapolis Grand Prix	Indianapolis Motor Speedway, Speedway
12	26 August	(Czech Republic) bwin Grand Prix České republiky	Brno Circuit, Brno
13	16 September	Gran Premio Aperol di San Marino e Della Riviera di Rimini	Misano World Circuit, Misano Adriatico
14	30 September	(Aragon) Gran Premio Iveco de Aragón	MotorLand Aragón, Alcañiz
15	14 October	AirAsia Grand Prix of Japan	Motegi Circuit, Motegi
16	21 October	(Malaysia) Malaysian Motorcycle Grand Prix	Sepang International Circuit, Sepang
17	28 October	(Australia) AirAsia Australian Grand Prix	Phillip Island Grand Prix Circuit, Phillip Island
18	11 November	(Valencian Community) Gran Premio Generali de la Comunitat Valenciana	Circuit Ricardo Tormo, Valencia

‡ = Night race
†† = Saturday race

=== Calendar changes ===
- The Czech Republic and Indianapolis Grand Prix swapped places.

== Teams and riders ==
- A provisional entry list was released by the Fédération Internationale de Motocyclisme on 13 January 2012.

Prototype entries
Team	Constructor		Motorcycle	No.	Rider	Rounds
(Italy) Ducati Team	Ducati		Desmosedici GP12	46	(Italy) Valentino Rossi	All
(Italy) Ducati Team	Ducati		Desmosedici GP12	69	(United States) Nicky Hayden	1–11, 13–18
(Italy) Pramac Racing Team	Ducati		Desmosedici GP12	8	(Spain) Héctor Barberá	1–9, 11, 13–18 (Note: Héctor Barberá competed in the first Friday practice session during round 11, before being replaced by Toni Elías.)
(Italy) Pramac Racing Team	Ducati		Desmosedici GP12	24	(Spain) Toni Elías	10–12
(Czech Republic) Cardion AB Motoracing	Ducati		Desmosedici GP12	17	(Czech Republic) Karel Abraham	1–7, 10–18
(Czech Republic) Cardion AB Motoracing	Ducati		Desmosedici GP12	2	(Italy) Franco Battaini	8
(Japan) Repsol Honda Team	Honda		RC213V	1	(Australia) Casey Stoner	1–11, 15–18
(Japan) Repsol Honda Team	Honda		RC213V	56	(United Kingdom) Jonathan Rea	13–14
(Japan) Repsol Honda Team	Honda		RC213V	26	(Spain) Dani Pedrosa	All
(Monaco) LCR Honda MotoGP	Honda		RC213V	6	(Germany) Stefan Bradl	All
(Italy) San Carlo Honda Gresini	Honda		RC213V	19	(Spain) Álvaro Bautista	All
(Japan) Yamaha Factory Racing	Yamaha		YZR-M1	11	(United States) Ben Spies	1–16
(Japan) Yamaha Factory Racing	Yamaha		YZR-M1	21	(Japan) Katsuyuki Nakasuga	18
(Japan) Yamaha Factory Racing	Yamaha		YZR-M1	99	(Spain) Jorge Lorenzo	All
(Japan) Yamaha YSP Racing Team	Yamaha		YZR-M1	21	(Japan) Katsuyuki Nakasuga	15
(France) Monster Yamaha Tech 3	Yamaha		YZR-M1	4	(Italy) Andrea Dovizioso	All
(France) Monster Yamaha Tech 3	Yamaha		YZR-M1	35	(United Kingdom) Cal Crutchlow	All
Claiming Rule Teams (CRT) entries
Team	Constructor	Engine	Motorcycle	No.	Rider	Rounds
(United States) Attack Performance	APR	Kawasaki	APR	15	(United States) Steve Rapp	10–11
(Spain) Power Electronics Aspar	ART	Aprilia	GP12	14	(France) Randy de Puniet	All
(Spain) Power Electronics Aspar	ART	Aprilia	GP12	41	(Spain) Aleix Espargaró	All
(Italy) Speed Master	ART	Aprilia	GP12	54	(Italy) Mattia Pasini	1–14
(Italy) Speed Master	ART	Aprilia	GP12	84	(Italy) Roberto Rolfo	15–18
(United Kingdom) Paul Bird Motorsport	ART	Aprilia	GP12	77	(United Kingdom) James Ellison	All
(United States) GPTech	BCL	Suzuki	GP212	20	(United States) Aaron Yates	11
(Spain) Avintia Blusens	BQR-FTR	Kawasaki	BQR	22	(Spain) Iván Silva	1
(Spain) Avintia Blusens	BQR-FTR	Kawasaki	BQR	68	(Colombia) Yonny Hernández	1
(Spain) Avintia Blusens	BQR	Kawasaki	BQR	22	(Spain) Iván Silva	2–12, 15–18
(Spain) Avintia Blusens	BQR	Kawasaki	BQR	44	(Spain) David Salom	13–14
(Spain) Avintia Blusens	BQR	Kawasaki	BQR	73	(Japan) Hiroshi Aoyama	18
(Spain) Avintia Blusens	BQR	Kawasaki	BQR	68	(Colombia) Yonny Hernández	2–16
(Spain) Avintia Blusens	BQR	Kawasaki	BQR	43	(Australia) Kris McLaren	17
(Spain) Avintia Blusens	Inmotec	Kawasaki	Inmotec	71	(Italy) Claudio Corti	18
(Italy) San Carlo Honda Gresini	FTR	Honda	MGP12	51	(Italy) Michele Pirro	All
(Italy) Came IodaRacing Project	Ioda	Aprilia	TR003	9	(Italy) Danilo Petrucci	1–12
(Italy) Came IodaRacing Project	Ioda-Suter	BMW	MMX1	9	(Italy) Danilo Petrucci	13–18
(Switzerland) NGM Mobile Forward Racing	Suter	BMW	MMX1	5	(United States) Colin Edwards	1–3, 5–18
(Switzerland) NGM Mobile Forward Racing	Suter	BMW	MMX1	7	(Australia) Chris Vermeulen	4

Key
Regular Rider
Wildcard Rider
Replacement Rider

All the bikes used Bridgestone tyres.

=== New entries ===
In June 2011, the FIM announced that six teams from Moto2 – Interwetten Paddock, Forward Racing, Marc VDS, Kiefer Racing, Speed Master, and BQR-Blusens (later renamed Avintia Racing) – had been granted entries to the 2012 grid; two additional entries – Paul Bird Motorsport and Ioda Racing – announced that they had been accepted to the grid, running under CRT regulations. However, Interwetten Paddock, Marc VDS, and Kiefer Racing were absent from the revised grid released by FIM in January 2012.

=== Rider changes ===
- Andrea Dovizioso left Repsol Honda Team to join Monster Yamaha Tech 3.
- Colin Edwards moved from Monster Yamaha Tech 3 to NGM Mobile Forward Racing.
- Stefan Bradl moved up from Moto2, joining LCR Honda MotoGP.
- Héctor Barberá still rode a Ducati, but he moved from Aspar Team to Pramac Racing Team.
- 2011 FIM Superstock 1000 Cup runner-up Danilo Petrucci debuted in the MotoGP category with Came IodaRacing Project.
- Randy de Puniet exchanged with Barberá, entering Power Electronics Aspar from Pramac Racing Team.
- Álvaro Bautista, who lost his place at the retiring Suzuki MotoGP team, joined San Carlo Honda Gresini.
- Iván Silva rode for Avintia Blusens.
- Aleix Espargaró stepped up from Pons Racing in Moto2 to Power Electronics Aspar.
- Michele Pirro was confirmed by San Carlo Honda Gresini, promoted from Moto2 to MotoGP.
- Mattia Pasini debuted from Moto2 with Speed Master.
- Avintia Blusens promoted Yonny Hernández from Moto2 to MotoGP.
- James Ellison returned to MotoGP from the British Superbike Championship, riding for Paul Bird Motorsport.
- Hiroshi Aoyama was moved by Honda to the Superbike World Championship. However, the Japanese rider replaced Yonny Hernández in Valencia.
- Toni Elías returned to Moto2 from LCR Honda MotoGP. During the season, Elías replaced Barberá (injured) for three rounds.
- On 1 September 2011, Loris Capirossi announced his retirement from racing to join the MotoGP Safety Commission.

== Results and standings ==
=== Grands Prix ===
Round	Grand Prix	Pole position	Fastest lap	Winning rider	Winning team	Winning constructor	Report
1	Qatar motorcycle Grand Prix	(Spain) Jorge Lorenzo	(Australia) Casey Stoner	(Spain) Jorge Lorenzo	(Japan) Yamaha Factory Racing	(Japan) Yamaha	Report
2	(Spain) Spanish motorcycle Grand Prix	(Spain) Jorge Lorenzo	(United Kingdom) Cal Crutchlow	(Australia) Casey Stoner	(Japan) Repsol Honda Team	(Japan) Honda	Report
3	(Portugal) Portuguese motorcycle Grand Prix	(Australia) Casey Stoner	(Spain) Jorge Lorenzo	(Australia) Casey Stoner	(Japan) Repsol Honda Team	(Japan) Honda	Report
4	(France) French motorcycle Grand Prix	(Spain) Dani Pedrosa	(Italy) Valentino Rossi	(Spain) Jorge Lorenzo	(Japan) Yamaha Factory Racing	(Japan) Yamaha	Report
5	(Catalonia) Catalan motorcycle Grand Prix	(Australia) Casey Stoner	(Spain) Jorge Lorenzo	(Spain) Jorge Lorenzo	(Japan) Yamaha Factory Racing	(Japan) Yamaha	Report
6	(United Kingdom) British motorcycle Grand Prix	(Spain) Álvaro Bautista	(Spain) Jorge Lorenzo	(Spain) Jorge Lorenzo	(Japan) Yamaha Factory Racing	(Japan) Yamaha	Report
7	(Netherlands) Dutch TT	(Australia) Casey Stoner	(Spain) Dani Pedrosa	(Australia) Casey Stoner	(Japan) Repsol Honda Team	(Japan) Honda	Report
8	(Germany) German motorcycle Grand Prix	(Australia) Casey Stoner	(Spain) Dani Pedrosa	(Spain) Dani Pedrosa	(Japan) Repsol Honda Team	(Japan) Honda	Report
9	(Italy) Italian motorcycle Grand Prix	(Spain) Dani Pedrosa	(Spain) Dani Pedrosa	(Spain) Jorge Lorenzo	(Japan) Yamaha Factory Racing	(Japan) Yamaha	Report
10	United States motorcycle Grand Prix	(Spain) Jorge Lorenzo	(Spain) Dani Pedrosa	(Australia) Casey Stoner	(Japan) Repsol Honda Team	(Japan) Honda	Report
11	Indianapolis motorcycle Grand Prix	(Spain) Dani Pedrosa	(Spain) Dani Pedrosa	(Spain) Dani Pedrosa	(Japan) Repsol Honda Team	(Japan) Honda	Report
12	Czech Republic motorcycle Grand Prix	(Spain) Jorge Lorenzo	(Spain) Jorge Lorenzo	(Spain) Dani Pedrosa	(Japan) Repsol Honda Team	(Japan) Honda	Report
13	San Marino and Rimini Riviera motorcycle Grand Prix	(Spain) Dani Pedrosa	(Spain) Jorge Lorenzo	(Spain) Jorge Lorenzo	(Japan) Yamaha Factory Racing	(Japan) Yamaha	Report
14	Aragon motorcycle Grand Prix	(Spain) Jorge Lorenzo	(Spain) Dani Pedrosa	(Spain) Dani Pedrosa	(Japan) Repsol Honda Team	(Japan) Honda	Report
15	(Japan) Japanese motorcycle Grand Prix	(Spain) Jorge Lorenzo	(Spain) Dani Pedrosa	(Spain) Dani Pedrosa	(Japan) Repsol Honda Team	(Japan) Honda	Report
16	(Malaysia) Malaysian motorcycle Grand Prix	(Spain) Jorge Lorenzo	(Spain) Dani Pedrosa	(Spain) Dani Pedrosa	(Japan) Repsol Honda Team	(Japan) Honda	Report
17	(Australia) Australian motorcycle Grand Prix	(Australia) Casey Stoner	(Australia) Casey Stoner	(Australia) Casey Stoner	(Japan) Repsol Honda Team	(Japan) Honda	Report
18	Valencian Community motorcycle Grand Prix	(Spain) Dani Pedrosa	(Spain) Dani Pedrosa	(Spain) Dani Pedrosa	(Japan) Repsol Honda Team	(Japan) Honda	Report

=== Riders' standings ===
Scoring system

Points were awarded to the top fifteen finishers. A rider had to finish the race to earn points.

Position	**1st**	**2nd**	**3rd**	**4th**	**5th**	**6th**	**7th**	**8th**	**9th**	**10th**	**11th**	**12th**	**13th**	**14th**	**15th**
Points	25	20	16	13	11	10	9	8	7	6	5	4	3	2	1

Pos	Rider	Bike		Team	QAT (Qatar)	SPA (Spain)	POR (Portugal)	FRA (France)	CAT (Catalonia)	GBR (United Kingdom)	NED (Netherlands)	GER (Germany)	ITA (Italy)	USA (United States)	INP (Indianapolis)	CZE (Czech Republic)	RSM (San Marino)	ARA (Aragon)	JPN (Japan)	MAL (Malaysia)	AUS (Australia)	VAL (Valencian Community)	Pts
1	(Spain) Jorge Lorenzo	Yamaha		Yamaha Factory Racing	**1**	**2**	2	1	1	1	Ret	2	1	**2**	2	**2**	1	**2**	**2**	**2**	2	Ret	350
2	(Spain) Dani Pedrosa	Honda		Repsol Honda Team	2	3	3	**4**	2	3	2	1	**2**	3	**1**	1	**Ret**	1	1	1	Ret	**1**	332
3	(Australia) Casey Stoner	Honda		Repsol Honda Team	3	1	**1**	3	**4**	2	**1**	**Ret**	8	1	4				5	3	**1**	3	254
4	(Italy) Andrea Dovizioso	Yamaha		Monster Yamaha Tech 3	5	5	4	7	3	19	3	3	3	4	3	4	4	3	4	13	4	6	218
5	(Spain) Álvaro Bautista	Honda		San Carlo Honda Gresini	7	6	6	10	6	**4**	Ret	7	10	8	5	6	3	6	3	6	5	4	178
6	(Italy) Valentino Rossi	Ducati		Ducati Team	10	9	7	2	7	9	13	6	5	Ret	7	7	2	8	7	5	7	10	163
7	(United Kingdom) Cal Crutchlow	Yamaha		Monster Yamaha Tech 3	4	4	5	8	5	6	5	8	6	5	Ret	3	Ret	4	Ret	Ret	3	Ret	151
8	(Germany) Stefan Bradl	Honda		LCR Honda MotoGP	8	7	9	5	8	8	Ret	5	4	7	6	5	6	Ret	6	Ret	6	Ret	135
9	(United States) Nicky Hayden	Ducati		Ducati Team	6	8	11	6	9	7	6	10	7	6	DNS		7	Ret	8	4	8	Ret	122
10	(United States) Ben Spies	Yamaha		Yamaha Factory Racing	11	11	8	16	10	5	4	4	11	Ret	Ret	Ret	5	5	Ret	Ret			88
11	(Spain) Héctor Barberá	Ducati		Pramac Racing Team	9	10	10	9	11	10	7	9	9		WD		Ret	12	10	7	12	Ret	83
12	(Spain) Aleix Espargaró	ART	CRT	Power Electronics Aspar	15	12	12	13	13	11	Ret	13	13	9	10	10	Ret	10	12	8	10	11	74
13	(France) Randy de Puniet	ART	CRT	Power Electronics Aspar	13	Ret	13	Ret	15	12	8	11	12	11	Ret	8	9	11	Ret	Ret	11	12	62
14	(Czech Republic) Karel Abraham	Ducati		Cardion AB Motoracing	Ret	17	Ret	Ret	12	WD	DNS			10	8	9	Ret	9	11	10	9	7	59
15	(Italy) Michele Pirro	FTR	CRT	San Carlo Honda Gresini	NC	Ret	14	14	14	13	9	Ret	DSQ	Ret	Ret	14	10	15	15	12	14	5	43
16	(United Kingdom) James Ellison	ART	CRT	Paul Bird Motorsport	18	Ret	Ret	11	16	14	14	15	14	Ret	15	15	13	14	14	9	Ret	9	35
17	(Colombia) Yonny Hernández	BQR-FTR	CRT	Avintia Blusens	14																		28
17	(Colombia) Yonny Hernández	BQR	CRT	Avintia Blusens		Ret	Ret	15	18	15	Ret	14	Ret	12	9	12	12	13	Ret	DNS			28
18	(Japan) Katsuyuki Nakasuga	Yamaha		Yamaha YSP Racing Team															9				27
18	(Japan) Katsuyuki Nakasuga	Yamaha		Yamaha Factory Racing																		2	27
19	(Italy) Danilo Petrucci	Ioda	CRT	Came IodaRacing Project	Ret	13	15	Ret	19	17	11	17	Ret	Ret	Ret	17							27
19	(Italy) Danilo Petrucci	Ioda-Suter	CRT	Came IodaRacing Project													14	17	Ret	11	13	8	27
20	(United States) Colin Edwards	Suter	CRT	NGM Mobile Forward Racing	12	16	DNS		NC	16	Ret	12	Ret	13	13	13	11	18	13	Ret	Ret	14	27
21	(United Kingdom) Jonathan Rea	Honda		Repsol Honda Team													8	7					17
22	(Italy) Mattia Pasini	ART	CRT	Speed Master	17	14	Ret	12	17	Ret	10	Ret	15	Ret	Ret	16	Ret	16					13
23	(Spain) Iván Silva	BQR-FTR	CRT	Avintia Blusens	16																		12
23	(Spain) Iván Silva	BQR	CRT	Avintia Blusens		15	Ret	18	20	18	12	18	16	14	12	Ret			Ret	Ret	15	Ret	12
24	(Spain) Toni Elías	Ducati		Pramac Racing Team										Ret	11	11							10
25	(Japan) Hiroshi Aoyama	BQR	CRT	Avintia Blusens																		13	3
26	(United States) Steve Rapp	APR	CRT	Attack Performance										DNQ	14								2
27	(Spain) David Salom	BQR	CRT	Avintia Blusens													15	Ret					1
	(Italy) Roberto Rolfo	ART	CRT	Speed Master															16	DSQ	Ret	Ret	0
	(United States) Aaron Yates	BCL	CRT	GPTech											16								0
	(Italy) Franco Battaini	Ducati		Cardion AB Motoracing								16											0
	(Australia) Chris Vermeulen	Suter	CRT	NGM Mobile Forward Racing				17															0
	(Italy) Claudio Corti	Inmotec	CRT	Avintia Blusens																		Ret	0
	(Australia) Kris McLaren	BQR	CRT	Avintia Blusens																	DNQ		0
Pos	Rider	Bike		Team	QAT (Qatar)	SPA (Spain)	POR (Portugal)	FRA (France)	CAT (Catalonia)	GBR (United Kingdom)	NED (Netherlands)	GER (Germany)	ITA (Italy)	USA (United States)	INP (Indianapolis)	CZE (Czech Republic)	RSM (San Marino)	ARA (Aragon)	JPN (Japan)	MAL (Malaysia)	AUS (Australia)	VAL (Valencian Community)	Pts

Colour	Result
Gold	Winner
Silver	Second place
Bronze	Third place
Green	Points classification
Blue	Non-points classification
Blue	Non-classified finish (NC)
Purple	Retired, not classified (Ret)
Red	Did not qualify (DNQ)
Red	Did not pre-qualify (DNPQ)
Black	Disqualified (DSQ)
White	Did not start (DNS)
White	Withdrew (WD)
White	Race cancelled (C)
Blank	Did not practice (DNP)
Blank	Did not arrive (DNA)
Blank	Excluded (EX)

**Bold** – Pole
Italics – Fastest Lap
Light blue – Rookie

Icon	Class
**CRT**	Claiming Rule Teams

=== Constructors' standings ===
Each constructor received the same number of points as their best placed rider in each race.

Pos	Constructor	QAT (Qatar)	SPA (Spain)	POR (Portugal)	FRA (France)	CAT (Catalonia)	GBR (United Kingdom)	NED (Netherlands)	GER (Germany)	ITA (Italy)	USA (United States)	INP (Indianapolis)	CZE (Czech Republic)	RSM (San Marino)	ARA (Aragon)	JPN (Japan)	MAL (Malaysia)	AUS (Australia)	VAL (Valencian Community)	Pts
1	(Japan) Honda	2	1	1	3	2	2	1	1	2	1	1	1	3	1	1	1	1	1	412
2	(Japan) Yamaha	1	2	2	1	1	1	3	2	1	2	2	2	1	2	2	2	2	2	386
3	(Italy) Ducati	6	8	7	2	7	7	6	6	5	6	7	7	2	8	7	4	7	7	192
4	(Italy) ART	13	12	12	11	13	11	8	11	12	9	10	8	9	10	12	8	10	9	100
5	(United Kingdom) FTR	NC	Ret	14	14	14	13	9	Ret	DSQ	Ret	Ret	14	10	15	15	12	14	5	43
6	(Spain) BQR		15	Ret	15	18	15	12	14	16	12	9	12	12	13	Ret	Ret	15	13	35
7	(Switzerland) Suter	12	16	DNS	17	NC	16	Ret	12	Ret	13	13	13	11	18	13	Ret	Ret	14	27
8	(Italy) Ioda-Suter													14	17	Ret	11	13	8	18
9	(Italy) Ioda	Ret	13	15	Ret	19	17	11	17	Ret	Ret	Ret	17							9
10	(United States) APR										DNQ	14								2
11	(Spain) BQR-FTR	14																		2
	(Canada) BCL											16								0
	(Spain) Inmotec																		Ret	0
Pos	Constructor	QAT (Qatar)	SPA (Spain)	POR (Portugal)	FRA (France)	CAT (Catalonia)	GBR (United Kingdom)	NED (Netherlands)	GER (Germany)	ITA (Italy)	USA (United States)	INP (Indianapolis)	CZE (Czech Republic)	RSM (San Marino)	ARA (Aragon)	JPN (Japan)	MAL (Malaysia)	AUS (Australia)	VAL (Valencian Community)	Pts

=== Teams' standings ===
The teams' standings were based on results obtained by regular and substitute riders; wild-card entries were ineligible.

Pos	Team	Bike No.	QAT (Qatar)	SPA (Spain)	POR (Portugal)	FRA (France)	CAT (Catalonia)	GBR (United Kingdom)	NED (Netherlands)	GER (Germany)	ITA (Italy)	USA (United States)	INP (Indianapolis)	CZE (Czech Republic)	RSM (San Marino)	ARA (Aragon)	JPN (Japan)	MAL (Malaysia)	AUS (Australia)	VAL (Valencian Community)	Pts
1	(Japan) Repsol Honda Team	1	3	1	**1**	3	**4**	2	**1**	**Ret**	8	1	4				5	3	**1**	3	603
1	(Japan) Repsol Honda Team	26	2	3	3	**4**	2	3	2	1	**2**	3	**1**	1	**Ret**	1	1	1	Ret	**1**	603
1	(Japan) Repsol Honda Team	56													8	7					603
2	(Japan) Yamaha Factory Racing	11	11	11	8	16	10	5	4	4	11	Ret	Ret	Ret	5	5	Ret	Ret			458
2	(Japan) Yamaha Factory Racing	21																		2	458
2	(Japan) Yamaha Factory Racing	99	**1**	**2**	2	1	1	1	Ret	2	1	**2**	2	**2**	1	**2**	**2**	**2**	2	Ret	458
3	(France) Monster Yamaha Tech 3	4	5	5	4	7	3	19	3	3	3	4	3	4	4	3	4	13	4	6	369
3	(France) Monster Yamaha Tech 3	35	4	4	5	8	5	6	5	8	6	5	Ret	3	Ret	4	Ret	Ret	3	Ret	369
4	(Italy) Ducati Team	46	10	9	7	2	7	9	13	6	5	Ret	7	7	2	8	7	5	7	10	285
4	(Italy) Ducati Team	69	6	8	11	6	9	7	6	10	7	6	DNS		7	Ret	8	4	8	Ret	285
5	(Italy) San Carlo Honda Gresini	19	7	6	6	10	6	**4**	Ret	7	10	8	5	6	3	6	3	6	5	4	221
5	(Italy) San Carlo Honda Gresini	51	NC	Ret	14	14	14	13	9	Ret	DSQ	Ret	Ret	14	10	15	15	12	14	5	221
6	(Spain) Power Electronics Aspar	14	13	Ret	13	Ret	15	12	8	11	12	11	Ret	8	9	11	Ret	Ret	11	12	136
6	(Spain) Power Electronics Aspar	41	15	12	12	13	13	11	Ret	13	13	9	10	10	Ret	10	12	8	10	11	136
7	(Monaco) LCR Honda MotoGP	6	8	7	9	5	8	8	Ret	5	4	7	6	5	6	Ret	6	Ret	6	Ret	135
8	(Italy) Pramac Racing Team	8	9	10	10	9	11	10	7	9	9		WD		Ret	12	10	7	12	Ret	93
8	(Italy) Pramac Racing Team	24										Ret	11	11							93
9	(Czech Republic) Cardion AB Motoracing	2								16											59
9	(Czech Republic) Cardion AB Motoracing	17	Ret	17	Ret	Ret	12	WD	DNS			10	8	9	Ret	9	11	10	9	7	59
10	(Spain) Avintia Blusens	22	16	15	Ret	18	20	18	12	18	16	14	12	Ret			Ret	Ret	15	Ret	44
10	(Spain) Avintia Blusens	43																	DNQ		44
10	(Spain) Avintia Blusens	44													15	Ret					44
10	(Spain) Avintia Blusens	68	14	Ret	Ret	15	18	15	Ret	14	Ret	12	9	12	12	13	Ret	DNS			44
10	(Spain) Avintia Blusens	73																		13	44
11	(United Kingdom) Paul Bird Motorsport	50	18	Ret	Ret	11	16	14	14	15	14	Ret	15	15	13	14	14	9	Ret	9	35
12	(Italy) Came IodaRacing Project	9	Ret	13	15	Ret	19	17	11	17	Ret	Ret	Ret	17	14	17	Ret	11	13	8	27
13	(Switzerland) NGM Mobile Forward Racing	5	12	16	DNS		NC	16	Ret	12	Ret	13	13	13	11	18	13	Ret	Ret	14	27
13	(Switzerland) NGM Mobile Forward Racing	7				17															27
14	(Italy) Speed Master	54	17	14	Ret	12	17	Ret	10	Ret	15	Ret	Ret	16	Ret	16					13
14	(Italy) Speed Master	84															16	DSQ	Ret	Ret	13
Pos	Team	Bike No.	QAT (Qatar)	SPA (Spain)	POR (Portugal)	FRA (France)	CAT (Catalonia)	GBR (United Kingdom)	NED (Netherlands)	GER (Germany)	ITA (Italy)	USA (United States)	INP (Indianapolis)	CZE (Czech Republic)	RSM (San Marino)	ARA (Aragon)	JPN (Japan)	MAL (Malaysia)	AUS (Australia)	VAL (Valencian Community)	Pts
