= IodaRacing Project =

Italian motorcycle racing team

IodaRacing
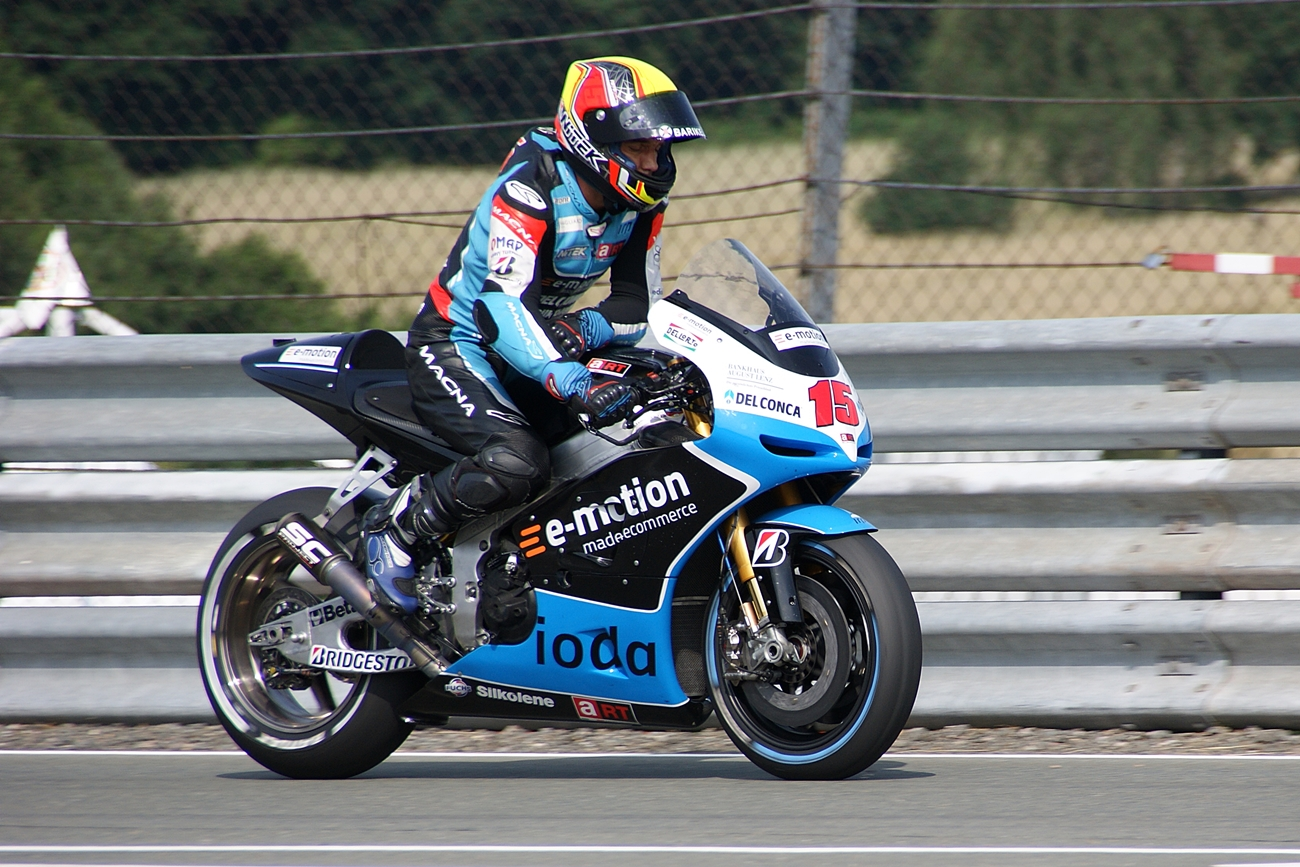
- 2017 name: IodaRacing
- Base: Terni, Italy
- Principal: Giampiero Sacchi
- Riders' Championships: CIV Moto3 Challenge: 2011: Armando Pontone

IodaRacing Project is an Italian motorcycle constructor and racing team based in Terni, Italy.

The team used to field Aprilia motorcycles in the Superbike World Championship with Leandro Mercado and Yamaha motorcycles in the Supersport 300 World Championship with Armando Pontone. Between 2011 and 2015 IodaRacing raced in the Grand Prix World Championship, making appearances in all three classes using different chassis.

== History ==
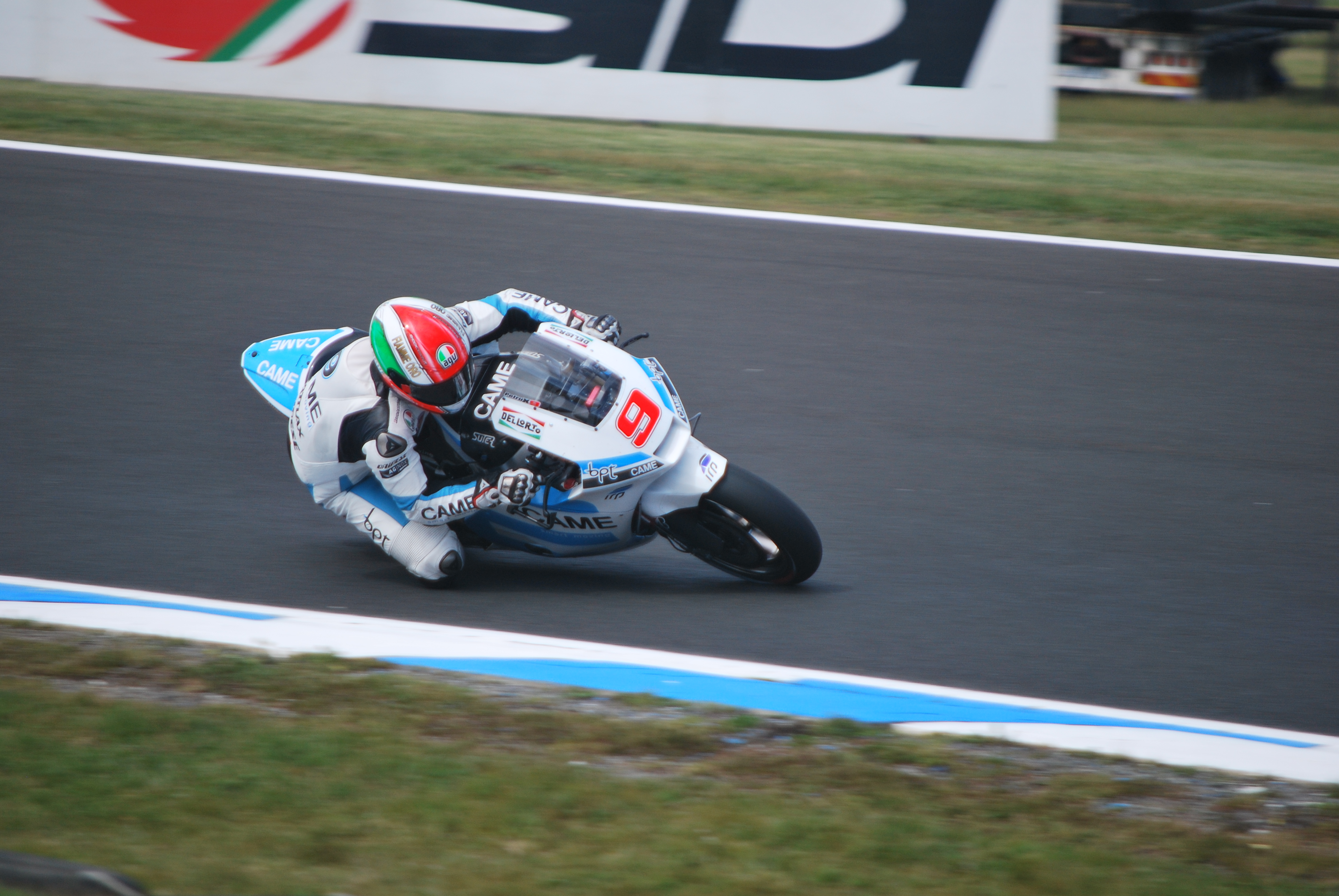
Danilo Petrucci at the 2012 Australian Grand Prix.

=== Background ===
Team principal Giampiero Sacchi had been involved in the sport since the 1980s when he was working in management and public relations. Sacchi ran his own team, Scuderia Carrizosa, from 1996 to 1998 in the 125cc and 250cc classes before working for Derbi Racing, Gilera and Aprilia between 1998 and 2010. Sacchi was also responsible for overseeing the careers of several champions including Valentino Rossi and Jorge Lorenzo. Sacchi launched IodaRacing Project in 2010 with intentions to enter Grand Prix motorcycle racing in 2011.

=== MotoGP ===
IodaRacing entered the MotoGP class under Claiming Rule Teams (CRT) regulations in 2012. The team used its own chassis, the TR003, with an Aprilia RSV4 engine. Danilo Petrucci was the team's rider for the season. Petrucci recorded seven points-scoring finishes across the eighteen races to finish nineteenth in the championship, with a best finish of eighth at the final round. The team switched to Suter frames and BMW engines midway through the season.

IodaRacing continued to use Suter-BMW machinery in 2013. The team expanded to run two bikes, one for Petrucci and one for Czech rider Lukáš Pešek.

In 2014 and 2015 IodaRacing switched to ART bikes.

=== Moto2 ===
IodaRacing first competed in Grand Prix motorcycle racing in 2011 in the Moto2 class. Simone Corsi and Mattia Pasini rode for the team, with FTR chassis being used. Corsi scored two podiums during the course of the season to finish sixth in the championship, with Pasini finishing in twenty-fourth. The team continued to use the FTR chassis in 2012, downsizing to one bike for Corsi. Corsi was unable to replicate the podium results of 2011, ending the season eleventh in the points with a best finish of fifth.

For 2013, IodaRacing switched to using a Suter chassis as it had done in the MotoGP class during the second half of 2012. With Corsi moving to NGM Mobile Racing, the team employed the 2011 125cc-class runner-up Johann Zarco. In 2014, Randy Krummenacher joined the team. His best result was 7th at the Sachsenring. In 2015, Florian Alt was the team's rider. Alt failed to score points, as his best result was 19th at Indianapolis.

=== Moto3 ===
IodaRacing competed in the 2012 Moto3 season using the Ioda TR002. Luigi Morciano and Jonas Folger began the season riding for the team, with Folger recording a best result of eleventh in France. However, this would prove to be the team's only points-scoring finish during the season. Folger left the team before the Indianapolis round, replaced by Armando Pontone. The team finished eighth in the Manufacturers' championship with 5 points.

== Models ==
IodaRacing Project has produced the following motorcycles for use in Grand Prix racing:

MotoGP

- TR003

Moto3

- TR001 (prototype)
- TR002
- TR004

== Results ==
=== MotoGP results ===
(key)

Year	Bike	Tyres	Riders	1	2	3	4	5	6	7	8	9	10	11	12	13	14	15	16	17	18	Points	Pos.
2012	Ioda TR003	B		QAT	ESP	POR	FRA	CAT	GBR	NED	GER	ITA	USA	IND	CZE	SMR	ARA	JPN	MAL	AUS	VAL	27	12th
2012	Ioda TR003	B	(Italy) Danilo Petrucci	Ret	13	15	Ret	19	17	11	17	Ret	Ret	Ret	17							27	12th
2012	Suter MMX1	B	(Italy) Danilo Petrucci													14	17	Ret	11	13	8	27	12th
2013	Suter MMX1	B		QAT	AME	ESP	FRA	ITA	CAT	NED	GER	USA	IND	CZE	GBR	SMR	ARA	MAL	AUS	JPN	VAL	26	11th
2013	Suter MMX1	B	(Italy) Danilo Petrucci	Ret	Ret	14	14	12	11	16	14	13	17	13	15	15	Ret	16	15	18	14	26	11th
2013	Suter MMX1	B	(Czech Republic) Lukáš Pešek	18	Ret	Ret	Ret	19	16	Ret	19	18	Ret	Ret	Ret	Ret	19	Ret	19	Ret	Ret	26	11th
2014	ART	B		QAT	AME	ARG	ESP	FRA	ITA	CAT	NED	GER	IND	CZE	GBR	SMR	ARA	JPN	AUS	MAL	VAL	17	13th
2014	ART	B	(Italy) Danilo Petrucci	14	17	Ret	DNS				15	15	Ret	Ret	18	Ret	11	Ret	12	Ret	12	17	13th
2014	ART	B	(Italy) Michel Fabrizio						Ret	20												17	13th
2015	ART	B		QAT	AME	ARG	ESP	FRA	ITA	CAT	NED	GER	IND	CZE	GBR	SMR	ARA	JPN	AUS	MAL	VAL	2	13th
2015	ART	B	(San Marino) Alex de Angelis	20	18	22	21	17	Ret	15	Ret	18	21	Ret	15	Ret	Ret	DNS				2	13th
2015	ART	B	(Australia) Broc Parkes																		Ret	2	13th
2015	ART	B	(Australia) Damian Cudlin																Ret	Ret		2	13th
