= 2015 MotoGP World Championship =

67th running of the MotoGP World Championship

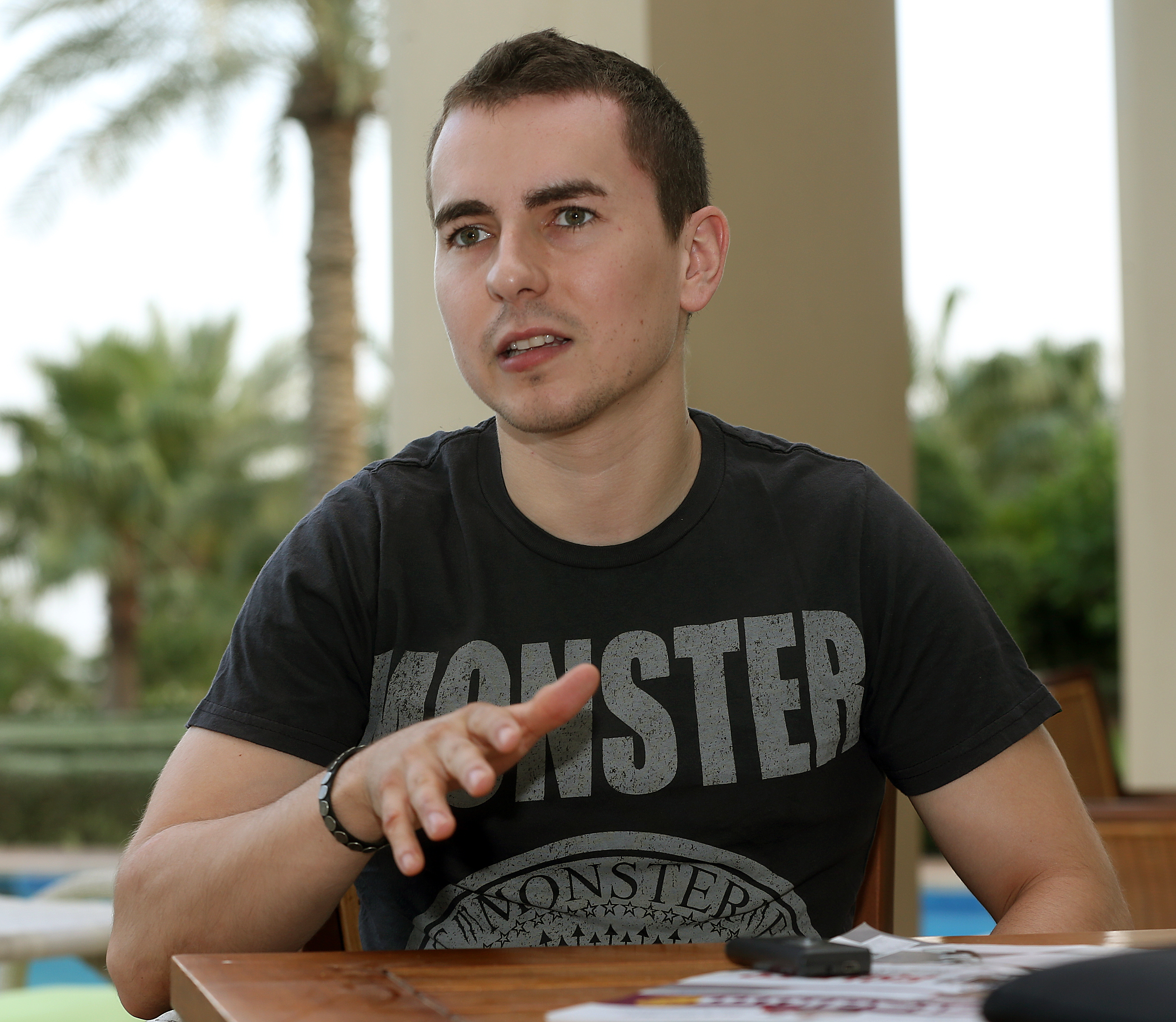
Jorge Lorenzo (pictured in 2013) was the 2015 MotoGP World Riders' Champion.

The 2015 FIM MotoGP World Championship was the premier class of the 67th Fédération Internationale de Motocyclisme (FIM) Road Racing World Championship season, the highest level of competition in motorcycle road racing. The championship was won by Spanish rider Jorge Lorenzo, racing for Movistar Yamaha MotoGP. It was his third and final world title in the MotoGP category, his fifth overall in Grand Prix motorcycle racing. The season had 18 races, beginning in Qatar and finishing in Valencia, which determined who would be world champion between Movistar Yamaha teammates Lorenzo and runner-up Valentino Rossi. It was first time since 2013 that the world title was decided on the final race of the season. Lorenzo also had the most pole positions, fastest laps and race wins throughout the season; while Rossi had the most finishes, completing every race throughout the season, while Lorenzo had one race retirement in San Marino.

2015 was the final season that Bridgestone was the sole tyre supplier for MotoGP, as Michelin became the sole tyre supplier for the 2016 season.

The 2015 season also saw the début of the Suzuki GSX-RR and Aprilia RS-GP. The GSX-RR previously made an appearance at the 2014 Valencian Grand Prix ahead of a full-season return for Suzuki as a factory team for the first time since 2011 and the RS-GP was used by Gresini Racing after the team split from Honda at the end of last season.

This season is well known for the Sepang clash, which involved a collision between two-time defending champion Marc Márquez and then-championship leader, Rossi. The clash remains one of the most memorable and controversial moments in the sport's history, with Rossi's penalty (a grid demotion in Valencia) for the incident helping Lorenzo win the race in Valencia and clinch his third MotoGP world title.

== Season summary ==
Marc Márquez started the season as the defending riders' champion, having won his second consecutive title in 2014. He had been undefeated in championships throughout his MotoGP career and won a record breaking 13 wins in a season.

Valentino Rossi led the championship for almost the entire season as he chased a tenth world title, but ultimately, the honours went to his Yamaha teammate Jorge Lorenzo, who took his third MotoGP title and a fifth world title overall. Lorenzo started the season quietly with three finishes off the podium, Rossi took wins in Qatar and an eventful win in Argentina, with Rossi chasing Márquez down for the lead before the two riders collided on the penultimate lap. Rossi stayed upright but Márquez was unable to rejoin the race, with Rossi calling Márquez voicing his displeasure in the press conference after the race, beginning an estrangement between the two riders that would impact the season and Lorenzo's eventual championship.

Thereafter, Lorenzo took four successive wins for the first time in his career to bring himself back into the championship race, before Rossi won at Assen. Lorenzo did not win again until Brno, taking the championship lead on countback, but ceded it back to Rossi, when he won at Silverstone. Lorenzo crashed out at Misano, while Rossi finished fifth ending a 16-race streak of podium finishes after both Yamaha riders were caught out by wet weather.

Rossi and Márquez again collided at Assen on the final lap; Rossi rejoined the circuit through the gravel and went on to win the race, while race direction deemed the incident as a racing incident.

At San Marino, Rossi was given a penalty point on his licence for impeding Lorenzo in qualifying, an incident that would cause implications later on in the season.

The Australian Grand Prix was won by Márquez, with Lorenzo second, Ducati's Andrea Iannone finishing third and Rossi fourth, in a race considered to be one of the greatest in MotoGP's history. There were more than 50 overtakes made between these four riders throughout the race, with 13 lead changes and Márquez setting the fastest lap on the final lap to ensure victory. Despite the incredible response from fans, Rossi was unhappy with how the race unfolded and, in the following pre-event press conference at Malaysia one week later, accused Marquez of helping Lorenzo in his title aspirations (a claim which Márquez refuted). This led leading up to one of the most infamous races in the sport's history one week later.

The Malaysian race was originally at risk of cancellation due to smoke from fires in Indonesia impacting the track, but ultimately went ahead. After a series of 18 overtakes and exchanges of positions between Rossi and Marquez while battling for third place, the two riders came together for their third collision of the season during lap seven. Rossi made a move on Márquez at Turn 14, pushing him to the outside of the circuit. The riders made contact and Márquez fell from his bike. Although he was able to remount his bike, Marquez was forced to pit and retire from the race. Rossi was able to maintain his position and finished the race in third place, with Márquez's Repsol Honda teammate Dani Pedrosa taking the win and Lorenzo finishing second. However, the incident divided fans, pundits and the riders on the grid, and Lorenzo was booed from the podium after giving Rossi a thumbs down gesture.

Race direction's subsequent review of the incident found Rossi to be at fault for the collision and three penalty points were added to his licence. Despite Rossi appealing the penalty to the Court of Arbitration for Sport, the penalty was upheld (despite the fact that Marquez's telemetry from the Sepang race was never shown to the public) and he was forced to start the final race of the season, in Valencia, from the back of the grid. Although Rossi voiced his regret at the move on Márquez, he did not apologise for the incident occurring. Race winner Pedrosa criticised Rossi's reaction to the incident, calling his response contradictory to previous comments made by Rossi on racing incidents, and Lorenzo made statements deeming the penalty "inadequate". Lorenzo submitted a statement against Rossi's appeal of the penalty but later apologised for his actions on the podium. Márquez defended his riding style in Malaysia, stating his disappointment towards both his rival's actions on the track and subsequent comments made to race direction.

The fallout from the Malaysian race included a clash between the Márquez family and Italian television reporters who invaded the family property in Barcelona, wrongful accusations of Lorenzo storming race direction to demand a penalty for Rossi, and hostile reactions by some fans in response to Rossi's appeal of the penalty being unsuccessful. FIM president Vito Ippolito deemed the events as having a "damaging effect on the staging of our competitions" and "[poisoning] the atmosphere around the sport". Ippolito and Dorna Sports boss Carmelo Ezpeleta called for a private meeting of all riders and crew chiefs in Valencia and cancelled the pre-event press conference. Separate meetings were also held with Lorenzo, Márquez and Rossi in the lead up to the race weekend.

In the four races leading up to the final round in Valencia, Rossi had finished ahead of Lorenzo only once, with the points gap between the two teammates closing from 23 after San Marino to just seven going into the final round. It was the first time in nine years that the championship would be determined in the final round, following Nicky Hayden's victory over Rossi in 2006.

At the final race, Rossi recovered from the back of the grid to finish fourth, while Lorenzo took his seventh win of the season to secure the world title by five points; the first time that Lorenzo had held a points lead all season. Rossi finished second place in the championship with a total of five wins and 15 podiums over the season, 83 points ahead of Marquez who had matched Rossi on wins but suffered six retirements. The only other rider to win a race during the season was Márquez's teammate Pedrosa, who took two wins in the closing four races, at Motegi and Sepang, after missing three races at the start of the season to undergo arm-pump surgery.

=== Other championship standings ===
The combined eleven wins and 27 podiums by Rossi and Lorenzo were enough to secure both the team's title for Movistar Yamaha, more than 200 points ahead of runner up Repsol Honda, and the manufacturers' title for Yamaha, 52 points ahead of Honda. Amongst the class of rookies, Suzuki rider Maverick Viñales took the IRTA Cup, finishing in twelfth place overall, while Héctor Barberá of Avintia Racing was the best-placed Open class rider, in fifteenth.

== Calendar ==
The following Grands Prix took place in 2015:

Round	Date	Grand Prix	Circuit
1	29 March ‡	Commercial Bank Grand Prix of Qatar	Lusail International Circuit, Lusail
2	12 April	(United States) Red Bull Grand Prix of the Americas	Circuit of the Americas, Austin
3	19 April	Gran Premio Red Bull de la República Argentina	Autódromo Termas de Río Hondo, Termas de Río Hondo
4	3 May	(Spain) Gran Premio bwin de España	Circuito de Jerez, Jerez de la Frontera
5	17 May	Monster Energy Grand Prix de France	Bugatti Circuit, Le Mans
6	31 May	(Italy) Gran Premio d'Italia TIM	Mugello Circuit, Scarperia e San Piero
7	14 June	(Catalonia) Gran Premi Monster Energy de Catalunya	Circuit de Barcelona-Catalunya, Montmeló
8	27 June ††	(Netherlands) Motul TT Assen	TT Circuit Assen, Assen
9	12 July	(Germany) GoPro Motorrad Grand Prix Deutschland	Sachsenring, Hohenstein-Ernstthal
10	9 August	Red Bull Indianapolis Grand Prix	Indianapolis Motor Speedway, Speedway
11	16 August	(Czech Republic) bwin Grand Prix České republiky	Brno Circuit, Brno
12	30 August	(United Kingdom) Octo British Grand Prix	Silverstone Circuit, Silverstone
13	13 September	Gran Premio TIM di San Marino e della Riviera di Rimini	Misano World Circuit, Misano Adriatico
14	27 September	(Aragon) Gran Premio Movistar de Aragón	MotorLand Aragón, Alcañiz
15	11 October	Motul Grand Prix of Japan	Motegi Circuit, Motegi
16	18 October	(Australia) Pramac Australian Motorcycle Grand Prix	Phillip Island Grand Prix Circuit, Phillip Island
17	25 October	Shell Malaysia Motorcycle Grand Prix	Sepang International Circuit, Sepang
18	8 November	(Valencian Community) Gran Premio Motul de la Comunitat Valenciana	Circuit Ricardo Tormo, Valencia

‡ = Night race
†† = Saturday race

=== Calendar changes ===
- The British Grand Prix had been scheduled to return to Donington Park for the first time since 2009, ahead of a planned move to the brand-new Circuit of Wales in 2016. However, Donington Park pulled out of hosting the event on 10 February 2015, citing financial delays. The following day, it was announced that Silverstone would host the British Grand Prix in 2015 and 2016.

== Teams and riders ==
As in 2014, the MotoGP class was divided into two categories: Factory and Open. Manufacturers who had not won a dry race since the start of the 2013 season or were new to the class could enter the Factory category with all the Open concessions.

A provisional entry list was released by the Fédération Internationale de Motocyclisme on 23 October 2014. An updated entry list was released on 2 February 2015.

Factory entries
Team	Constructor	Motorcycle	No.	Rider	Rounds
(Italy) Aprilia Racing Team Gresini	Aprilia	RS-GP	19	(Spain) Álvaro Bautista	All
(Italy) Aprilia Racing Team Gresini	Aprilia	RS-GP	33	(Italy) Marco Melandri	1–8
(Italy) Aprilia Racing Team Gresini	Aprilia	RS-GP	70	(United Kingdom) Michael Laverty	9
(Italy) Aprilia Racing Team Gresini	Aprilia	RS-GP	6	(Germany) Stefan Bradl	10–18
(Italy) Octo IodaRacing Team (Italy) E-Motion IodaRacing Team	ART	ART GP13	15	(San Marino) Alex de Angelis	1–15
(Italy) Octo IodaRacing Team (Italy) E-Motion IodaRacing Team	ART	ART GP13	55	(Australia) Damian Cudlin	16–17
(Italy) Octo IodaRacing Team (Italy) E-Motion IodaRacing Team	ART	ART GP13	23	(Australia) Broc Parkes	18
(Italy) Ducati Team	Ducati	Desmosedici GP15	04	(Italy) Andrea Dovizioso	All
(Italy) Ducati Team	Ducati	Desmosedici GP15	29	(Italy) Andrea Iannone	All
(Italy) Ducati Team	Ducati	Desmosedici GP15	51	(Italy) Michele Pirro	6, 13, 18
(Italy) Pramac Racing (Italy) Octo Pramac Racing	Ducati	Desmosedici GP14	9	(Italy) Danilo Petrucci	All
(Italy) Pramac Racing (Italy) Octo Pramac Racing	Ducati	Desmosedici GP14	68	(Colombia) Yonny Hernández	All
(Japan) Repsol Honda Team	Honda	RC213V	26	(Spain) Dani Pedrosa	1, 5–18
(Japan) Repsol Honda Team	Honda	RC213V	7	(Japan) Hiroshi Aoyama	2–4
(Japan) Repsol Honda Team	Honda	RC213V	93	(Spain) Marc Márquez	All
(Japan) Team HRC with Nissin	Honda	RC213V	72	(Japan) Takumi Takahashi	15
(Monaco) CWM LCR Honda (Monaco) LCR Honda	Honda	RC213V	35	(United Kingdom) Cal Crutchlow	All
(Belgium) EG 0,0 Marc VDS	Honda	RC213V	45	(United Kingdom) Scott Redding	All
(Japan) Team Suzuki Ecstar	Suzuki	GSX-RR	25	(Spain) Maverick Viñales	All
(Japan) Team Suzuki Ecstar	Suzuki	GSX-RR	41	(Spain) Aleix Espargaró	All
(Japan) Movistar Yamaha MotoGP	Yamaha	YZR-M1	46	(Italy) Valentino Rossi	All
(Japan) Movistar Yamaha MotoGP	Yamaha	YZR-M1	99	(Spain) Jorge Lorenzo	All
(Japan) Yamaha Factory Racing Team	Yamaha	YZR-M1	21	(Japan) Katsuyuki Nakasuga	15
(France) Monster Yamaha Tech 3	Yamaha	YZR-M1	38	(United Kingdom) Bradley Smith	All
(France) Monster Yamaha Tech 3	Yamaha	YZR-M1	44	(Spain) Pol Espargaró	All
Open entries
Team	Constructor	Motorcycle	No.	Rider	Rounds
(Spain) Avintia Racing	Ducati	Desmosedici GP14	8	(Spain) Héctor Barberá	All
(Spain) Avintia Racing	Ducati	Desmosedici GP14	63	(France) Mike Di Meglio	All
(Czech Republic) AB Motoracing	Honda	RC213V-RS	17	(Czech Republic) Karel Abraham	1–7, 11–14
(Czech Republic) AB Motoracing	Honda	RC213V-RS	7	(Japan) Hiroshi Aoyama	9
(Czech Republic) AB Motoracing	Honda	RC213V-RS	24	(Spain) Toni Elías	10
(Czech Republic) AB Motoracing	Honda	RC213V-RS	64	(Japan) Kousuke Akiyoshi	15
(Czech Republic) AB Motoracing	Honda	RC213V-RS	13	(Australia) Anthony West	16–18
(Monaco) CWM LCR Honda (Monaco) LCR Honda	Honda	RC213V-RS	43	(Australia) Jack Miller	All
(Spain) Aspar MotoGP Team	Honda	RC213V-RS	50	(Republic of Ireland) Eugene Laverty	All
(Spain) Aspar MotoGP Team	Honda	RC213V-RS	69	(United States) Nicky Hayden	All
(Switzerland) Athinà Forward Racing (Switzerland) Forward Racing	Yamaha Forward	Yamaha Forward	6	(Germany) Stefan Bradl	1–8
(Switzerland) Athinà Forward Racing (Switzerland) Forward Racing	Yamaha Forward	Yamaha Forward	71	(Italy) Claudio Corti	9
(Switzerland) Athinà Forward Racing (Switzerland) Forward Racing	Yamaha Forward	Yamaha Forward	71	(Italy) Claudio Corti	11–13
(Switzerland) Athinà Forward Racing (Switzerland) Forward Racing	Yamaha Forward	Yamaha Forward	24	(Spain) Toni Elías	14–18
(Switzerland) Athinà Forward Racing (Switzerland) Forward Racing	Yamaha Forward	Yamaha Forward	76	(France) Loris Baz	1–9, 11–18

Key
Regular rider
Wildcard rider
Replacement rider

All the bikes used Bridgestone tyres.

=== Team changes ===
- Suzuki returned to MotoGP as a constructor after a four-year hiatus.
- Aprilia made an official return to the championship entering two factory-supported bikes with Gresini Racing. The Italian team ended its long partnership with Honda, having raced their bikes since 1997.
- Marc VDS Racing expanded its operations to enter a Honda bike in the MotoGP category, having taken on the Factory class bike previously run by Gresini.
- LCR Honda entered a second bike in the Open category.
- Avintia Racing left its Kawasaki-based machinery to switch to Ducati bikes.
- Paul Bird Motorsport left MotoGP at the end of the 2014 season to concentrate on their British Superbike Championship campaign.

=== Rider changes ===
- Stefan Bradl left the LCR Honda team and moved to Forward Racing. After the German Grand Prix, Bradl moved to Gresini Racing.
- Cal Crutchlow left the Ducati Team to take Bradl's place at LCR Honda.
- Andrea Iannone filled the seat vacated by Crutchlow with the Ducati factory team.
- Scott Redding left Gresini Racing and returned to Marc VDS Racing for their MotoGP campaign.
- Moto3 rider Jack Miller moved directly into MotoGP, with LCR Honda.
- Colin Edwards retired from racing at the end of the 2014 season and became a Yamaha test rider.
- Loris Baz made his MotoGP debut with Forward Racing.
- After competing in the final half of the 2014 season with Forward Racing, Alex de Angelis replaced Danilo Petrucci at the IodaRacing Project.
- Danilo Petrucci moved from the IodaRacing Project to join Pramac Racing.
- Aleix Espargaró moved from Forward Racing to join the factory Suzuki team, with Maverick Viñales making the move from Moto2 to partner him.
- Eugene Laverty returned to the championship – having last competed in 2008 in the 250cc class – racing with the Aspar Team.
- Marco Melandri returned to MotoGP with Gresini Racing, the same team he competed with during his last appearance in the category in 2010. Before the German Grand Prix, Melandri left Aprilia, and was replaced by Michael Laverty. Bradl replaced Laverty afterwards.
- Hiroshi Aoyama moved from the Aspar Team to become a test rider for HRC. Aoyama returned to the series on two occasions during the 2015 season, to replace injured riders.

==== Mid-season changes ====
- Hiroshi Aoyama replaced Dani Pedrosa for the races in Austin, Texas and Argentina, as Pedrosa elected to undergo surgery to alleviate issues with arm-pump. This was extended to include the Spanish Grand Prix, as Pedrosa's recovery took longer than expected. Aoyama also replaced Karel Abraham at the Sachsenring with AB Motoracing.
- Claudio Corti replaced Stefan Bradl for the German Grand Prix, after Bradl fractured his right scaphoid at Assen. Corti was replaced by Toni Elías prior to the Aragon Grand Prix.
- Forward Racing did not compete at the Indianapolis Grand Prix following the arrest of team boss Giovanni Cuzari. Bradl terminated his contract with the team, and joined Gresini Racing, to replace Michael Laverty.
- Toni Elías replaced Karel Abraham at the Indianapolis Grand Prix, as Abraham recovered from injuries sustained at the Catalan Grand Prix. Elías later replaced Claudio Corti at Forward Racing, prior to the Aragon Grand Prix.
- Alex de Angelis suffered serious injuries in a crash during free practice at the Japanese Grand Prix. He was replaced by Damian Cudlin for the Australian and Malaysian races, and Broc Parkes in Valencia.
- In order to aid his recovery from injuries sustained at the Catalan Grand Prix, Karel Abraham stepped down from his AB Motoracing ride. He was replaced by Kousuke Akiyoshi in Japan, and Anthony West for the remainder of the season.

== Results and standings ==
=== Grands Prix ===
Round	Grand Prix	Pole position	Fastest lap	Winning rider	Winning team	Winning constructor	Report
1	Qatar motorcycle Grand Prix	(Italy) Andrea Dovizioso	(Italy) Valentino Rossi	(Italy) Valentino Rossi	(Japan) Movistar Yamaha MotoGP	(Japan) Yamaha	Report
2	(United States) Motorcycle Grand Prix of the Americas	(Spain) Marc Márquez	(Italy) Andrea Iannone	(Spain) Marc Márquez	(Japan) Repsol Honda Team	(Japan) Honda	Report
3	(Argentina) Argentine Republic motorcycle Grand Prix	(Spain) Marc Márquez	(Italy) Valentino Rossi	(Italy) Valentino Rossi	(Japan) Movistar Yamaha MotoGP	(Japan) Yamaha	Report
4	(Spain) Spanish motorcycle Grand Prix	(Spain) Jorge Lorenzo	(Spain) Jorge Lorenzo	(Spain) Jorge Lorenzo	(Japan) Movistar Yamaha MotoGP	(Japan) Yamaha	Report
5	(France) French motorcycle Grand Prix	(Spain) Marc Márquez	(Italy) Valentino Rossi	(Spain) Jorge Lorenzo	(Japan) Movistar Yamaha MotoGP	(Japan) Yamaha	Report
6	(Italy) Italian motorcycle Grand Prix	(Italy) Andrea Iannone	(Spain) Marc Márquez	(Spain) Jorge Lorenzo	(Japan) Movistar Yamaha MotoGP	(Japan) Yamaha	Report
7	(Catalonia) Catalan motorcycle Grand Prix	(Spain) Aleix Espargaró	(Spain) Marc Márquez	(Spain) Jorge Lorenzo	(Japan) Movistar Yamaha MotoGP	(Japan) Yamaha	Report
8	(Netherlands) Dutch TT	(Italy) Valentino Rossi	(Spain) Marc Márquez	(Italy) Valentino Rossi	(Japan) Movistar Yamaha MotoGP	(Japan) Yamaha	Report
9	(Germany) German motorcycle Grand Prix	(Spain) Marc Márquez	(Spain) Marc Márquez	(Spain) Marc Márquez	(Japan) Repsol Honda Team	(Japan) Honda	Report
10	Indianapolis motorcycle Grand Prix	(Spain) Marc Márquez	(Spain) Marc Márquez	(Spain) Marc Márquez	(Japan) Repsol Honda Team	(Japan) Honda	Report
11	Czech Republic motorcycle Grand Prix	(Spain) Jorge Lorenzo	(Spain) Marc Márquez	(Spain) Jorge Lorenzo	(Japan) Movistar Yamaha MotoGP	(Japan) Yamaha	Report
12	(United Kingdom) British motorcycle Grand Prix	(Spain) Marc Márquez	(Italy) Valentino Rossi	(Italy) Valentino Rossi	(Japan) Movistar Yamaha MotoGP	(Japan) Yamaha	Report
13	San Marino and Rimini Riviera motorcycle Grand Prix	(Spain) Jorge Lorenzo	(Spain) Jorge Lorenzo	(Spain) Marc Márquez	(Japan) Repsol Honda Team	(Japan) Honda	Report
14	Aragon motorcycle Grand Prix	(Spain) Marc Márquez	(Spain) Jorge Lorenzo	(Spain) Jorge Lorenzo	(Japan) Movistar Yamaha MotoGP	(Japan) Yamaha	Report
15	(Japan) Japanese motorcycle Grand Prix	(Spain) Jorge Lorenzo	(Spain) Jorge Lorenzo	(Spain) Dani Pedrosa	(Japan) Repsol Honda Team	(Japan) Honda	Report
16	(Australia) Australian motorcycle Grand Prix	(Spain) Marc Márquez	(Spain) Marc Márquez	(Spain) Marc Márquez	(Japan) Repsol Honda Team	(Japan) Honda	Report
17	(Malaysia) Malaysian motorcycle Grand Prix	(Spain) Dani Pedrosa	(Spain) Jorge Lorenzo	(Spain) Dani Pedrosa	(Japan) Repsol Honda Team	(Japan) Honda	Report
18	Valencian Community motorcycle Grand Prix	(Spain) Jorge Lorenzo	(Spain) Jorge Lorenzo	(Spain) Jorge Lorenzo	(Japan) Movistar Yamaha MotoGP	(Japan) Yamaha	Report

=== Riders' standings ===
Scoring system

Points were awarded to the top fifteen finishers. A rider had to finish the race to earn points.

Position	**1st**	**2nd**	**3rd**	**4th**	**5th**	**6th**	**7th**	**8th**	**9th**	**10th**	**11th**	**12th**	**13th**	**14th**	**15th**
Points	25	20	16	13	11	10	9	8	7	6	5	4	3	2	1

Pos	Rider	Bike		Team	QAT (Qatar)	AME (United States)	ARG (Argentina)	SPA (Spain)	FRA (France)	ITA (Italy)	CAT (Catalonia)	NED (Netherlands)	GER (Germany)	INP (Indianapolis)	CZE (Czech Republic)	GBR (United Kingdom)	RSM (San Marino)	ARA (Aragon)	JPN (Japan)	AUS (Australia)	MAL (Malaysia)	VAL (Valencian Community)	Pts
1	(Spain) Jorge Lorenzo	Yamaha		Movistar Yamaha MotoGP	4	4	5	**1**	1	1	1	3	4	2	**1**	4	**Ret**	1	**3**	2	2	**1**	330
2	(Italy) Valentino Rossi	Yamaha		Movistar Yamaha MotoGP	1	3	1	3	2	3	2	**1**	3	3	3	1	5	3	2	4	3	4	325
3	(Spain) Marc Márquez	Honda		Repsol Honda Team	5	**1**	**Ret**	2	**4**	Ret	Ret	2	**1**	**1**	2	**Ret**	1	**Ret**	4	**1**	Ret	2	242
4	(Spain) Dani Pedrosa	Honda		Repsol Honda Team	6				16	4	3	8	2	4	5	5	9	2	1	5	**1**	3	206
5	(Italy) Andrea Iannone	Ducati		Ducati Team	3	5	4	6	5	**2**	4	4	5	5	4	8	7	4	Ret	3	Ret	Ret	188
6	(United Kingdom) Bradley Smith	Yamaha		Monster Yamaha Tech 3	8	6	6	8	6	5	5	7	6	6	7	7	2	8	7	10	4	6	181
7	(Italy) Andrea Dovizioso	Ducati		Ducati Team	**2**	2	2	9	3	Ret	Ret	12	Ret	9	6	3	8	5	5	13	Ret	7	162
8	(United Kingdom) Cal Crutchlow	Honda		LCR Honda	7	7	3	4	Ret	Ret	Ret	6	7	8	Ret	Ret	11	7	6	7	5	9	125
9	(Spain) Pol Espargaró	Yamaha		Monster Yamaha Tech 3	9	Ret	8	5	7	6	Ret	5	8	7	8	Ret	Ret	9	Ret	8	9	5	114
10	(Italy) Danilo Petrucci	Ducati		Octo Pramac Racing	12	10	11	12	10	9	9	11	9	10	10	2	6	Ret	Ret	12	6	10	113
11	(Spain) Aleix Espargaró	Suzuki		Team Suzuki Ecstar	11	8	7	7	Ret	Ret	**Ret**	9	10	14	9	9	10	6	11	9	7	8	105
12	(Spain) Maverick Viñales	Suzuki		Team Suzuki Ecstar	14	9	10	11	9	7	6	10	11	11	Ret	11	14	11	Ret	6	8	11	97
13	(United Kingdom) Scott Redding	Honda		EG 0,0 Marc VDS	13	Ret	9	13	Ret	11	7	13	Ret	13	12	6	3	12	10	11	11	15	84
14	(Colombia) Yonny Hernández	Ducati		Octo Pramac Racing	10	Ret	Ret	10	8	10	Ret	14	12	12	11	Ret	Ret	10	14	17	12	13	56
15	(Spain) Héctor Barberá	Ducati	Open	Avintia Racing	15	12	13	14	13	13	16	Ret	13	15	16	13	18	16	9	16	13	16	33
16	(Spain) Álvaro Bautista	Aprilia		Aprilia Racing Team Gresini	Ret	15	19	15	15	14	10	17	14	18	13	10	15	13	16	14	15	14	31
17	(France) Loris Baz	Yamaha Forward	Open	Forward Racing	22	17	14	Ret	12	12	13	15	19		15	16	4	17	Ret	18	Ret	19	28
18	(Germany) Stefan Bradl	Yamaha Forward	Open	Athinà Forward Racing	16	Ret	15	16	Ret	Ret	8	Ret											17
18	(Germany) Stefan Bradl	Aprilia		Aprilia Racing Team Gresini										20	14	Ret	16	18	18	21	10	18	17
19	(Australia) Jack Miller	Honda	Open	LCR Honda	Ret	14	12	20	Ret	Ret	11	Ret	15	Ret	19	Ret	12	19	Ret	15	17	21	17
20	(United States) Nicky Hayden	Honda	Open	Aspar MotoGP Team	17	13	16	17	11	Ret	Ret	16	16	16	17	12	17	15	13	Ret	16	17	16
21	(Italy) Michele Pirro	Ducati		Ducati Team						8							Ret					12	12
22	(Republic of Ireland) Eugene Laverty	Honda	Open	Aspar MotoGP Team	18	16	17	18	14	15	12	Ret	17	19	Ret	17	19	14	17	19	19	Ret	9
23	(Japan) Katsuyuki Nakasuga	Yamaha		Yamaha Factory Racing Team															8				8
24	(France) Mike Di Meglio	Ducati	Open	Avintia Racing	19	Ret	18	22	Ret	16	14	18	Ret	17	18	14	13	20	15	20	18	Ret	8
25	(Japan) Hiroshi Aoyama	Honda		Repsol Honda Team		11	Ret	Ret															5
25	(Japan) Hiroshi Aoyama	Honda	Open	AB Motoracing									Ret										5
26	(Japan) Takumi Takahashi	Honda		Team HRC with Nissin															12				4
27	(Spain) Toni Elías	Honda	Open	AB Motoracing										22									2
27	(Spain) Toni Elías	Yamaha Forward	Open	Forward Racing														21	20	22	14	20	2
28	(San Marino) Alex de Angelis	ART		E-Motion IodaRacing Team	20	18	22	21	17	Ret	15	Ret	18	21	Ret	15	Ret	Ret	DNS				2
	(Czech Republic) Karel Abraham	Honda	Open	AB Motoracing	Ret	Ret	21	Ret	Ret	17	DNS				21	19	21	Ret					0
	(Italy) Marco Melandri	Aprilia		Aprilia Racing Team Gresini	21	Ret	20	19	18	18	Ret	19											0
	(Italy) Claudio Corti	Yamaha Forward	Open	Forward Racing									Ret		20	18	20						0
	(Japan) Kousuke Akiyoshi	Honda	Open	AB Motoracing															19				0
	(Australia) Anthony West	Honda	Open	AB Motoracing																23	20	22	0
	(United Kingdom) Michael Laverty	Aprilia		Aprilia Racing Team Gresini									20										0
	(Australia) Damian Cudlin	ART		E-Motion IodaRacing Team																Ret	Ret		0
	(Australia) Broc Parkes	ART		E-Motion IodaRacing Team																		Ret	0
Pos	Rider	Bike		Team	QAT (Qatar)	AME (United States)	ARG (Argentina)	SPA (Spain)	FRA (France)	ITA (Italy)	CAT (Catalonia)	NED (Netherlands)	GER (Germany)	INP (Indianapolis)	CZE (Czech Republic)	GBR (United Kingdom)	RSM (San Marino)	ARA (Aragon)	JPN (Japan)	AUS (Australia)	MAL (Malaysia)	VAL (Valencian Community)	Pts

Colour	Result
Gold	Winner
Silver	Second place
Bronze	Third place
Green	Points classification
Blue	Non-points classification
Blue	Non-classified finish (NC)
Purple	Retired, not classified (Ret)
Red	Did not qualify (DNQ)
Red	Did not pre-qualify (DNPQ)
Black	Disqualified (DSQ)
White	Did not start (DNS)
White	Withdrew (WD)
White	Race cancelled (C)
Blank	Did not practice (DNP)
Blank	Did not arrive (DNA)
Blank	Excluded (EX)

**Bold** – Pole
Italics – Fastest Lap
Light blue – Rookie

Icon	Class
**Open**	Open Entry

=== Constructors' standings ===
Each constructor received the same number of points as their best placed rider in each race.

Pos	Constructor	QAT (Qatar)	AME (United States)	ARG (Argentina)	SPA (Spain)	FRA (France)	ITA (Italy)	CAT (Catalonia)	NED (Netherlands)	GER (Germany)	INP (Indianapolis)	CZE (Czech Republic)	GBR (United Kingdom)	RSM (San Marino)	ARA (Aragon)	JPN (Japan)	AUS (Australia)	MAL (Malaysia)	VAL (Valencian Community)	Pts
1	(Japan) Yamaha	1	3	1	1	1	1	1	1	3	2	1	1	2	1	2	2	2	1	407
2	(Japan) Honda	5	1	3	2	4	4	3	2	1	1	2	5	1	2	1	1	1	2	355
3	(Italy) Ducati	2	2	2	6	3	2	4	4	5	5	4	2	6	4	5	3	6	7	256
4	(Japan) Suzuki	11	8	7	7	9	7	6	9	10	11	9	9	10	6	11	6	7	8	137
5	(Italy) Aprilia	21	15	19	15	15	14	10	17	14	18	13	10	15	13	16	14	10	14	36
6	(Switzerland) Yamaha Forward	16	17	14	16	12	12	8	15	19		15	16	4	17	20	18	14	19	35
7	(Italy) ART	20	18	22	21	17	Ret	15	Ret	18	21	Ret	15	Ret	Ret	DNS	Ret	Ret	Ret	2
Pos	Constructor	QAT (Qatar)	AME (United States)	ARG (Argentina)	SPA (Spain)	FRA (France)	ITA (Italy)	CAT (Catalonia)	NED (Netherlands)	GER (Germany)	INP (Indianapolis)	CZE (Czech Republic)	GBR (United Kingdom)	RSM (San Marino)	ARA (Aragon)	JPN (Japan)	AUS (Australia)	MAL (Malaysia)	VAL (Valencian Community)	Pts

=== Teams' standings ===
The teams' standings were based on results obtained by regular and substitute riders; wild-card entries were ineligible.

Pos	Team	Bike No.	QAT (Qatar)	AME (United States)	ARG (Argentina)	SPA (Spain)	FRA (France)	ITA (Italy)	CAT (Catalonia)	NED (Netherlands)	GER (Germany)	INP (Indianapolis)	CZE (Czech Republic)	GBR (United Kingdom)	RSM (San Marino)	ARA (Aragon)	JPN (Japan)	AUS (Australia)	MAL (Malaysia)	VAL (Valencian Community)	Pts
1	(Japan) Movistar Yamaha MotoGP	46	1	3	1	3	2	3	2	**1**	3	3	3	1	5	3	2	4	3	4	655
1	(Japan) Movistar Yamaha MotoGP	99	4	4	5	**1**	1	1	1	3	4	2	**1**	4	**Ret**	1	**3**	2	2	**1**	655
2	(Japan) Repsol Honda Team	7		11	Ret	Ret															453
2	(Japan) Repsol Honda Team	26	6				16	4	3	8	2	4	5	5	9	2	1	5	**1**	3	453
2	(Japan) Repsol Honda Team	93	5	**1**	**Ret**	2	**4**	Ret	Ret	2	**1**	**1**	2	**Ret**	1	**Ret**	4	**1**	Ret	2	453
3	(Italy) Ducati Team	04	**2**	2	2	9	3	Ret	Ret	12	Ret	9	6	3	8	5	5	13	Ret	7	350
3	(Italy) Ducati Team	29	3	5	4	6	5	**2**	4	4	5	5	4	8	7	4	Ret	3	Ret	Ret	350
4	(France) Monster Yamaha Tech 3	38	8	6	6	8	6	5	5	7	6	6	7	7	2	8	7	10	4	6	295
4	(France) Monster Yamaha Tech 3	44	9	Ret	8	5	7	6	Ret	5	8	7	8	Ret	Ret	9	Ret	8	9	5	295
5	(Japan) Team Suzuki Ecstar	25	14	9	10	11	9	7	6	10	11	11	Ret	11	14	11	Ret	6	8	11	202
5	(Japan) Team Suzuki Ecstar	41	11	8	7	7	Ret	Ret	**Ret**	9	10	14	9	9	10	6	11	9	7	8	202
6	(Italy) Octo Pramac Racing	9	12	10	11	12	10	9	9	11	9	10	10	2	6	Ret	Ret	12	6	10	169
6	(Italy) Octo Pramac Racing	68	10	Ret	Ret	10	8	10	Ret	14	12	12	11	Ret	Ret	10	14	17	12	13	169
7	(Monaco) LCR Honda	35	7	7	3	4	Ret	Ret	Ret	6	7	8	Ret	Ret	11	7	6	7	5	9	142
7	(Monaco) LCR Honda	43	Ret	14	12	20	Ret	Ret	11	Ret	15	Ret	19	Ret	12	19	Ret	15	17	21	142
8	(Belgium) EG 0,0 Marc VDS	45	13	Ret	9	13	Ret	11	7	13	Ret	13	12	6	3	12	10	11	11	15	84
9	(Spain) Avintia Racing	8	15	12	13	14	13	13	16	Ret	13	15	16	13	18	16	9	16	13	16	41
9	(Spain) Avintia Racing	63	19	Ret	18	22	Ret	16	14	18	Ret	17	18	14	13	20	15	20	18	Ret	41
10	(Switzerland) Forward Racing	6	16	Ret	15	16	Ret	Ret	8	Ret											39
10	(Switzerland) Forward Racing	24														21	20	22	14	20	39
10	(Switzerland) Forward Racing	71									Ret		20	18	20						39
10	(Switzerland) Forward Racing	76	22	17	14	Ret	12	12	13	15	19		15	16	4	17	Ret	18	Ret	19	39
11	(Italy) Aprilia Racing Team Gresini	6										20	14	Ret	16	18	18	21	10	18	39
11	(Italy) Aprilia Racing Team Gresini	19	Ret	15	19	15	15	14	10	17	14	18	13	10	15	13	16	14	15	14	39
11	(Italy) Aprilia Racing Team Gresini	33	21	Ret	20	19	18	18	Ret	19											39
11	(Italy) Aprilia Racing Team Gresini	70									20										39
12	(Spain) Aspar MotoGP Team	50	18	16	17	18	14	15	12	Ret	17	19	Ret	17	19	14	13	19	19	Ret	25
12	(Spain) Aspar MotoGP Team	69	17	13	16	17	11	Ret	Ret	16	16	16	17	12	17	15	17	Ret	16	17	25
13	(Italy) E-Motion IodaRacing Team	15	20	18	22	21	17	Ret	15	Ret	18	21	Ret	15	Ret	Ret	DNS				2
13	(Italy) E-Motion IodaRacing Team	23																		Ret	2
13	(Italy) E-Motion IodaRacing Team	55																Ret	Ret		2
	(Czech Republic) AB Motoracing	7									Ret										0
	(Czech Republic) AB Motoracing	13																23	20	22	0
	(Czech Republic) AB Motoracing	17	Ret	Ret	21	Ret	Ret	17	DNS				21	19	21	Ret					0
	(Czech Republic) AB Motoracing	24										22									0
	(Czech Republic) AB Motoracing	64															19				0
Pos	Team	Bike No.	QAT (Qatar)	AME (United States)	ARG (Argentina)	SPA (Spain)	FRA (France)	ITA (Italy)	CAT (Catalonia)	NED (Netherlands)	GER (Germany)	INP (Indianapolis)	CZE (Czech Republic)	GBR (United Kingdom)	RSM (San Marino)	ARA (Aragon)	JPN (Japan)	AUS (Australia)	MAL (Malaysia)	VAL (Valencian Community)	Pts
