= Kenta Fujii =

Japanese motorcycle racer

- Nationality: Japanese
- Born: 4 April 1994 (age 32); Suzuka, Japan
- Current team: au · tellurium MotoUP RT
- Bike number: 090
Motorcycle racing career statistics
Moto3 World Championship
Active years	2012
Manufacturers	TSR Honda
2012 championship position	NC (0 pts)
Starts / Wins / Podiums / Poles / F. laps / Points; 17 / 0 / 0 / 0 / 0 / 0

Kenta Fujii (born 4 April 1994 in Suzuka) is a Japanese Grand Prix motorcycle racer. He currently competes in the All Japan Road Race J-GP3 Championship aboard a Honda NSF250R. He has previously competed in the MFJ All Japan Road Race GPMono Championship, the MFJ All Japan Road Race GP125 Championship, the MFJ All Japan Road Race J-GP3 Championship and the Spanish CEV Moto3 Championship. Fujii won the GPMono title in 2010, and the J-GP3 title in 2011.

== Career statistics ==
=== All career ===
2008- 2nd, All Japan GPMono Championship #51 Honda
2009- 17th, All Japan GP125 Championship #51 TSR KTM / 3rd, All Japan GPMono Championship #3 TSR KTM
2010- 12th, All Japan J-GP3 Championship #17 Honda RS125R / 1st, All Japan GPMono Championship #3 TSR Honda
2011- 1st, All Japan J-GP3 Championship #12 Honda NSF250R / 2nd, All Japan GPMono Championship #1 TSR Honda
2012- NC, Moto3 World Championship #51 TSR Honda
2013- 18th, CEV Moto3 Championship #51 TSR Honda
2014- NC, CEV Moto3 Championship #51 TSR Honda
2017- 1st, All Japan Road Race JP250 Championship #90 Honda CBR250RR
2018- All Japan Road Race J-GP3 Championship #090 Honda NSF250R

=== FIM CEV Moto3 Junior World Championship ===
==== Races by year ====
(key) (Races in bold indicate pole position, races in italics indicate fastest lap)

Year	Bike	1	2	3	4	5	6	7	8	9	10	11	Pos	Pts
2013	TSR Honda	CAT1; 8	CAT2; 11	ARA; 13	ALB1; 11	ALB2	NAV; 19	VAL1; 27	VAL1; 30	JER; 31			18th	21
2014	TSR Honda	JER1; 27	JER2; 23	LMS; 27	ARA; 30	CAT1; 23	CAT2; 23	ALB	NAV	ALG	VAL1	VAL2	NC	0

=== Grand Prix motorcycle racing ===
==== By season ====
Season	Class	Motorcycle	Team	Number	Race	Win	Podium	Pole	FLap	Pts	Plcd
2012	Moto3	TSR Honda	Technomag-CIP-TSR	51	17	0	0	0	0	0	NC
Total					**17**	**0**	**0**	**0**	**0**	**0**	

==== Races by year ====
(key)

Yr	Class	Bike	1	2	3	4	5	6	7	8	9	10	11	12	13	14	15	16	17	Final Pos	Pts
2012	Moto3	TSR Honda	QAT; 21	SPA; Ret	POR; 23	FRA; Ret	CAT; 25	GBR; 24	NED; 27	GER; 23	ITA; 25	INP; 18	CZE; 26	RSM; 22	ARA; 26	JPN; 18	MAL; 27	AUS; 22	VAL; 23	NC	0
