= 2012 German motorcycle Grand Prix =

Eighth round of 2012 Grand Prix motorcycle racing season

(Germany) 2012 German Grand Prix
Race details
- Race 8 of 18 races in the 2012 Grand Prix motorcycle racing season
- Date: 8 July 2012
- Official name: eni Motorrad Grand Prix Deutschland
- Location: Sachsenring
- Course: Permanent racing facility; 3.671 km (2.281 mi)

MotoGP
Pole position
Rider	(Australia) Casey Stoner	Honda
Time	1:31.796	
Fastest lap
Rider	(Spain) Dani Pedrosa	Honda
Time	1:22.304	
Podium
First	(Spain) Dani Pedrosa	Honda
Second	(Spain) Jorge Lorenzo	Yamaha
Third	(Italy) Andrea Dovizioso	Yamaha

Moto2
Pole position
Rider	(Spain) Marc Márquez	Suter
Time	1:34.503	
Fastest lap
Rider	(San Marino) Alex de Angelis	FTR
Time	1:25.167	
Podium
First	(Spain) Marc Márquez	Suter
Second	(Finland) Mika Kallio	Kalex
Third	(San Marino) Alex de Angelis	FTR

Moto3
Pole position
Rider	(Germany) Sandro Cortese	KTM
Time	1:42.989	
Fastest lap
Rider	(Germany) Sandro Cortese	KTM
Time	1:36.728	
Podium
First	(Germany) Sandro Cortese	KTM
Second	(France) Alexis Masbou	Honda
Third	(Spain) Luis Salom	Kalex KTM

The 2012 German motorcycle Grand Prix was the eighth round of the 2012 Grand Prix motorcycle racing season. It took place on the weekend of 6–8 July 2012 at the Sachsenring in Chemnitz, Germany.

== MotoGP race report ==
This race was most notable for the battle between Casey Stoner and Dani Pedrosa, Stoner's eventual retirement from the race and Pedrosa's victory.

After seven rounds, the top spot is now tied between two riders: On one side Jorge Lorenzo and on the other Casey Stoner, both with 140 points. Lorenzo however, is at the top because he has won one more race than Stoner, namely four to three. In third sits Dani Pedrosa with a close 121 points.

On Saturday, it was Casey Stoner who took the pole - his fourth pole of the season - with a time of 1:31.796. Second is Ben Spies who is +0.193 seconds behind and third is Dani Pedrosa who is +0.285 seconds behind. The second row of the grid consists out of Cal Crutchlow, Jorge Lorenzo and home hero Stefan Bradl in fourth, fifth and sixth place. Álvaro Bautista has to start from the back of the grid after a collision he had with Lorenzo at the previous round in the Netherlands and Franco Battaini replaces the injured Karel Abraham.

All the riders make their way through the warm-up lap, then line up on their respective grid slots. As the lights go out, it is Pedrosa who gets the holeshot from third to lead going into the Coca-Cola Kurve (Turn 1). Spies, who initially looked to have made a good start, does not gain or lose any places but gets relegated to third at Turn 2 when Stoner overtakes him from the outside. Lorenzo and Bradl both make up one position. Crutchlow loses out the most, dropping from fourth to seventh position. In the early stages, it is a Repsol Honda 1-2 that leads the way on the opening lap. Stoner is all over the back of Pedrosa and as they plunge down from Turn 12 to the Sachsen Kurve (Turn 13), he thinks of making a move but decides to stay behind for the time being. At the Queckenberg Kurve (Turn 14), Crutchlow goes up the inside of Nicky Hayden for sixth place.

On lap two, the top two start to open up a small gap to the Factory Yamaha duo of Spies and Lorenzo. At Turn 10, Stoner makes a pass for the lead by taking a shorter line than Pedrosa, switching the lead from one Repsol Honda to the other. Behind them, Crutchlow also passes Bradl for fifth. Héctor Barberá goes up the inside of Valentino Rossi at the Sachsen Kurve for ninth position. Rossi tries to replicate at the Queckenberg Kurve, but to no avail.

Lap three and Andrea Dovizioso has now opened up a gap to his teammate Crutchlow in sixth place. Stoner has opened up a gap to Pedrosa of +0.402 seconds in sector two. Rossi retakes ninth from Barberá. The gap Stoner has to Pedrosa has increased to +0.508 seconds in sector three. Exiting the Queckenberg Kurve, Hayden has a bit of a moment and does a small wheelie because of it.

As Stoner crosses the line to start lap three, the gap shrinks again to +0.485 seconds. In sector one, the gap increases to +0.562 seconds. Michele Pirro has entered the pits to retire from the race due to mechanical problems, the San Carlo Gresini Honda rider stepping off and inspecting the rear of his bike. In sector two, the gap drops to +0.536 seconds. Stoner also sets the fastest lap of the race as his gap continues to decrease to +0.497

On lap four, the gap of the top two continues to increase. Lorenzo has now passed a struggling Spies, who ran wide at Turn 11, who also has come under pressure from Dovizioso. At the Queckenberg Kurve, Crutchlow looks to pass his teammate Dovizioso, but slams on the brakes and decides to stay behind for the time being.

Lap five the gap Pedrosa has to Lorenzo is +2.260 seconds. Mattia Pasini has crashed out of the race, the rider walking away unhurt from the scene.

On lap six, the gap Pedrosa has to Lorenzo is +2.878 seconds. Bautista meanwhile has made up multiple positions and is now in eleventh place, overtaking Randy de Puniet at the Sachsen Kurve a lap earlier.

Lap seven and Cruchlow is now all over the back of his teammate Dovizioso. Bradl is also being harassed by Hayden, the American almost making a move at the Sachsen Kurve but staying behind for the time being.

On lap eight, Dovizioso outbreaks Spies and gets ahead at the Coca-Cola Kurve for fourth. At the Sachsen Kurve, Crutchlow dives down the inside of Spies and passes him for fifth place.

Lap nine and the midfield is very close to each other, starting from Dovizioso. At the front, Stoner is still ahead of Pedrosa but he is slowly closing the gap again.

On lap ten, Crutchlow is all over the back of Dovizioso, the Englishman looking for a way past.

Lap eleven and Crutchlow is still trying to find a way past Dovizioso. Exiting Turn 12, it looked like Crutchlow was ready to get alongside but once again decides to stay behind for the time being.

On lap twelve, the gap between the top two is still stable. No overtakes happen at the front.

Lap thirteen and Spies has closed the gap to Curtchlow, now making it a three-way battle for fourth again. The gap Pedrosa has to Lorenzo is +4.392 seconds and the gap Lorenzo has to Dovizioso is +3.750 seconds.

On lap fourteen, Pedrosa sets the fastest lap. No overtakes happen at the front.

Lap fifteen - the halfway point of the race - and Pedrosa is now slowly closing the gap. Exiting Turn 12, he is now all over the back of the Australian.

On lap sixteen, Pedrosa is still all over the rear of Stoner, shadowing his every move. No overtakes happened at the front.

Lap seventeen and Pedrosa still shadows Stoner from second place, not making any pass.

On lap eighteen however, Pedrosa finally makes his move. He moves out of the slipstream, goes alongside and outbreaks his teammate, taking over the lead. Exiting Turn 5, switching over from the right to the left side, Stoner has a huge moment, causing him to lose time and tow to Pedrosa.

Lap nineteen and Stoner's gap to Lorenzo is +6.497 seconds and Lorenzo's gap to Dovizioso is +5.350 seconds. Stoner slowly closes the gap to Pedrosa and is all over the back of him again exiting Turn 12.

On lap twenty, Stoner looks to make a pass going on the inside at the start/finish straight but stays behind for now. Further back, Rossi overtakes Barberá for ninth. Stoner is still all over the back of Pedrosa, not yet making a pass however.

Lap twenty-one and Stoner's gap to Lorenzo is +7.667 seconds. A bit further back, Dovizioso is still leading the group of three, consisting of Crutchlow and Spies. Spies has a look at the outside of the Coca-Cola Kurve, but stays behind for the time being.

On lap twenty-two, Stoner's gap back to Lorenzo is +8.104 seconds and Lorenzo's gap back to Dovizioso is +6.549 seconds. Stoner is still right behind Pedrosa, shadowing his every move.

Lap twenty-three and Crutchlow is still all over the back of Dovizioso as well, himself being followed closely by Spies. Entering the Sachsen Kurve, both Crutchlow and Spies look to be making a move but decide to stay behind for the time being.

On lap twenty-four, Stoner's gap to Lorenzo is +9.415 seconds and Lorenzo's gap to Dovizioso is +6.867 seconds. Pedrosa and Stoner are still very close together, as are Dovizioso and Crutchlow a bit further back. Exiting Turn 12, he is right behind the Italian but isn't able to make a move, opting to take a slightly different line entering the Sachsen Kurve and go side by side with Dovizioso on exit, but isn't able to take the position and has to slot behind him entering the Queckenberg Kurve.

Lap twenty-five and Crutchlow now outbrakes himself entering the Coca-Cola Kurve, going wide and entering the gravel trap at low speed. He turns the bike and pushes with his feet as to not lose any speed and manages to get back onto the circuit relatively quickly, though he loses multiple places and drops all the way down to eleventh place. Pedrosa and Stoner at the front now have to pass two backmarkers - rookie Danilo Petrucci and Iván Silva - at the short straight between the Sachsen and the Queckenberg Kurve. Both pass them without any problems.

On lap twenty-six, the gap Stoner has to Lorenzo is 10.690 seconds and the gap Lorenzo has to Dovizioso is 7.417 seconds. Stoner is still very close to the back of Pedrosa, still not making a move.

Lap twenty-seven and Stoner is really pushing, still staying behind Pedrosa but waiting for the right opportunity to strike. Backmarker Battaini almost gets in the way of the fight at the Queckenberg Kurve but moves out of the way just in time.

On lap twenty-eight, the penultimate lap of the race, the gap Stoner has to Lorenzo is +11.684 seconds and the gap Lorenzo has to Dovizioso is +6.978 seconds. Further back, Rossi overtakes Barberá for seventh at the entrance of the Coca-Cola Kurve. Stoner is still right behind Pedrosa but still has not made a move. Bautistá tries to retake seventh place from Rossi via a very late lunge at the Sachsen Kurve but runs his bike way too deep and loses two positions as a result. Crutchlow also tries to make a pass by going up his inside at the Queckenberg Kurve but fails to properly make the move and has to stay behind, himself being overtaken by Barberá at the start/finish straight as a result.

The final lap - lap twenty-nine - has started and Pedrosa now sets the fastest lap. Stoner is all over the back of Pedrosa but has still not been able to get past the Spaniard. Drama unfolds at the Sachsen Kurve however as Stoner goes a bit too wide, loses the front and slides out of a strong second place and into the gravel, the Australian tumbling on for a bit before running to his bike to get it restarted. Pedrosa has no further issues and crosses the line to win his first race of the season. Coincidentally, it starts to rain very lightly just as he crosses the line. After lapping Petrucci, Lorenzo comes home in second place, doing a wheelie in the process. Stoner has not been able to get the bike restarted and is forced to retire, him walking alongside the marshalls away from the scene. A photofinish-esque third place is reserved for Dovizioso, who pips Spies just as they both cross the line, the American missing out on a podium finish and having to settle for fourth position. Further back, Bradl holds off Rossi for fifth, the Italian finishing ahead of a charging Bautistá to come home sixth. Stoner is still walking away from the crash site, the marshalls recovering his bike off the circuit by now.

On the parade lap back to parc-fermé, Pedrosa gets greeted by all the marshalls who wave their flags. Pedrosa puts his arm in the air as the crowd celebrates his win. Rossi comes alongside Pedrosa and shakes his hand while still on the bike, congratulating him on his victory, Hayden doing likewise.

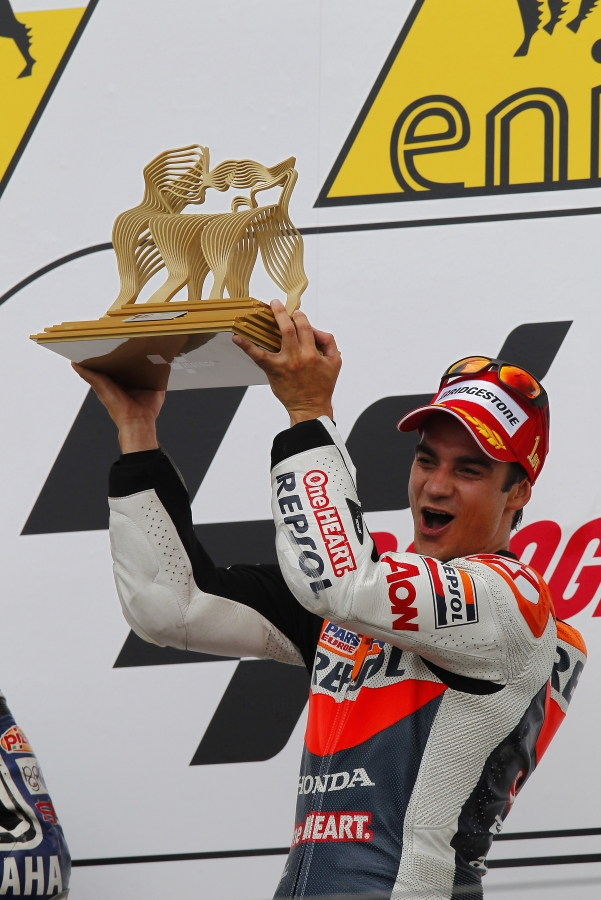
Dani Pedrosa, celebrating on the podium after winning the MotoGP race.

Pedrosa is the first rider to arrive at parc-fermé, being congratulated by some of his crewmembers as he puts both his arms in the air to signal victory. He gets hugged by one of the crewmembers, then happily stares into the camera as he celebrates on. Now both Dovizioso and Lorenzo arrive at parc-fermé, the Italian stepping off his bike already. Dovizioso then inspects his own and the other riders' rear tyres for wear as Pedrosa takes off his gloves, still sitting on the bike. A disappointed Stoner has now arrived back at the garage, sitting down in his chair and taking off his gloves in the meantime. As home hero Bradl goes back to his pit box, the crowd cheers him on. Pedrosa meanwhile gets hugged by the Repsol Honda crewmembers at the edge of the fence as Bradl also gets a hero reception at the LCR Honda pit box, the crewmembers hugging him and standing around his bike. Lorenzo goes up to Pedrosa back at parc-fermé and gives him a handshake to congratulate him on the win, then walks over to the section where the media is to be interviewed.

All the riders make their way onto the podium, beginning with Dovizioso, then Lorenzo and then a happy Pedrosa. The constructors trophy gets handed to the crew chief of Honda, then Stanislaw Tillich (then prime minister of Saxony) hands over the third-place trophy to Dovizioso. Vito Ippolito hands the second-place trophy to Lorenzo before Tillich hands Pedrosa the winners trophy, the crowd loudly cheering for him as he receives his trophy. The Spanish national anthem plays for Pedrosa as he smiles with glee on the podium. Once the anthem stops, the crowd applauds and cheers once more as the podium girls hand the riders the champagne, Pedrosa soaking Mike Leitner as others spray each other and the crowd before drinking some of it.

Pedrosa's win, Stoner's retirement and Lorenzo's second place has now blown the title hunt wide open again. Lorenzo now leads the title again on points, having 160 points. In second place is now Pedrosa with 146 points, overtaking Stoner who now is in third place with 140 points.

== MotoGP classification ==
Pos.	No.	Rider	Team	Manufacturer	Laps	Time/Retired	Grid	Points
1	26	(Spain) Dani Pedrosa	Repsol Honda Team	Honda	30	41:28.396	3	25
2	99	(Spain) Jorge Lorenzo	Yamaha Factory Racing	Yamaha	30	+14.996	5	20
3	4	(Italy) Andrea Dovizioso	Monster Yamaha Tech 3	Yamaha	30	+20.669	8	16
4	11	(United States) Ben Spies	Yamaha Factory Racing	Yamaha	30	+20.740	2	13
5	6	(Germany) Stefan Bradl	LCR Honda MotoGP	Honda	30	+27.893	6	11
6	46	(Italy) Valentino Rossi	Ducati Team	Ducati	30	+28.050	9	10
7	19	(Spain) Álvaro Bautista	San Carlo Honda Gresini	Honda	30	+28.246	21	9
8	35	(United Kingdom) Cal Crutchlow	Monster Yamaha Tech 3	Yamaha	30	+28.447	4	8
9	8	(Spain) Héctor Barberá	Pramac Racing Team	Ducati	30	+29.053	11	7
10	69	(United States) Nicky Hayden	Ducati Team	Ducati	30	+29.226	7	6
11	14	(France) Randy de Puniet	Power Electronics Aspar	ART	30	+53.176	13	5
12	5	(United States) Colin Edwards	NGM Mobile Forward Racing	Suter	30	+58.204	12	4
13	41	(Spain) Aleix Espargaró	Power Electronics Aspar	ART	30	+1:04.654	10	3
14	68	(Colombia) Yonny Hernández	Avintia Blusens	BQR	30	+1:13.543	17	2
15	77	(United Kingdom) James Ellison	Paul Bird Motorsport	ART	30	+1:30.318	19	1
16	2	(Italy) Franco Battaini	Cardion AB Motoracing	Ducati	29	+1 lap	20	
17	9	(Italy) Danilo Petrucci	Came IodaRacing Project	Ioda	29	+1 lap	15	
18	22	(Spain) Iván Silva	Avintia Blusens	BQR	29	+1 lap	18	
Ret	1	(Australia) Casey Stoner	Repsol Honda Team	Honda	29	Accident	1	
Ret	54	(Italy) Mattia Pasini	Speed Master	ART	4	Accident	14	
Ret	51	(Italy) Michele Pirro	San Carlo Honda Gresini	FTR	3	Retirement	16	

== Moto2 classification ==
Pos	No	Rider	Manufacturer	Laps	Time/Retired	Grid	Points
1	93	(Spain) Marc Márquez	Suter	29	41:32.467	1	25
2	36	(Finland) Mika Kallio	Kalex	29	+2.093	3	20
3	15	(San Marino) Alex de Angelis	FTR	29	+2.567	8	16
4	40	(Spain) Pol Espargaró	Kalex	29	+5.990	17	13
5	12	(Switzerland) Thomas Lüthi	Suter	29	+6.139	6	11
6	3	(Italy) Simone Corsi	FTR	29	+11.051	13	10
7	38	(United Kingdom) Bradley Smith	Tech 3	29	+11.409	9	9
8	19	(Belgium) Xavier Siméon	Tech 3	29	+14.808	4	8
9	71	(Italy) Claudio Corti	Kalex	29	+20.769	19	7
10	77	(Switzerland) Dominique Aegerter	Suter	29	+25.141	15	6
11	5	(France) Johann Zarco	Motobi	29	+27.467	14	5
12	80	(Spain) Esteve Rabat	Kalex	29	+27.475	27	4
13	88	(Spain) Ricard Cardús	AJR	29	+28.590	12	3
14	18	(Spain) Nicolás Terol	Suter	29	+28.713	24	2
15	60	(Spain) Julián Simón	Suter	29	+32.787	2	1
16	29	(Italy) Andrea Iannone	Speed Up	29	+35.376	10	
17	8	(United Kingdom) Gino Rea	Suter	29	+37.591	5	
18	76	(Germany) Max Neukirchner	Kalex	29	+45.667	22	
19	30	(Japan) Takaaki Nakagami	Kalex	29	+47.436	21	
20	44	(Italy) Roberto Rolfo	Suter	29	+49.341	31	
21	50	(Australia) Damian Cudlin	Bimota	29	+50.704	23	
22	10	(Switzerland) Marco Colandrea	FTR	29	+1:12.766	32	
23	11	(Germany) Kevin Wahr	IAMT	29	+1:14.334	29	
24	4	(Switzerland) Randy Krummenacher	Kalex	28	+1 lap	20	
25	21	(Germany) Markus Reiterberger	MZ-RE Honda	28	+1 lap	30	
26	57	(Brazil) Eric Granado	Motobi	28	+1 lap	28	
DSQ	95	(Australia) Anthony West	Moriwaki	29	(+35.596)	7	
Ret	14	(Thailand) Ratthapark Wilairot	Suter	25	Accident	16	
Ret	82	(Spain) Elena Rosell	Moriwaki	19	Retirement	34	
Ret	49	(Spain) Axel Pons	Kalex	18	Retirement	33	
Ret	72	(Japan) Yuki Takahashi	FTR	16	Retirement	11	
Ret	22	(Italy) Alessandro Andreozzi	Speed Up	6	Accident	25	
Ret	24	(Spain) Toni Elías	Suter	5	Accident	18	
Ret	45	(United Kingdom) Scott Redding	Kalex	0	Accident	26	

== Moto3 classification ==
Pos	No	Rider	Manufacturer	Laps	Time/Retired	Grid	Points
1	11	(Germany) Sandro Cortese	KTM	27	45:36.868	1	25
2	10	(France) Alexis Masbou	Honda	27	+0.635	10	20
3	39	(Spain) Luis Salom	Kalex KTM	27	+3.998	9	16
4	8	(Australia) Jack Miller	Honda	27	+4.051	4	13
5	7	(Spain) Efrén Vázquez	FTR Honda	27	+12.119	14	11
6	63	(Malaysia) Zulfahmi Khairuddin	KTM	27	+25.174	20	10
7	55	(Spain) Héctor Faubel	Kalex KTM	27	+25.499	12	9
8	43	(Germany) Luca Grünwald	Honda	27	+26.087	16	8
9	61	(Australia) Arthur Sissis	KTM	27	+29.675	21	7
10	84	(Czech Republic) Jakub Kornfeil	FTR Honda	27	+29.891	5	6
11	9	(Germany) Toni Finsterbusch	Honda	27	+33.178	15	5
12	27	(Italy) Niccolò Antonelli	FTR Honda	27	+42.858	18	4
13	89	(France) Alan Techer	TSR Honda	27	+1:02.653	19	3
14	31	(Finland) Niklas Ajo	KTM	27	+1:10.253	11	2
15	15	(Italy) Simone Grotzkyj	Suter Honda	27	+1:10.447	23	1
16	19	(Italy) Alessandro Tonucci	FTR Honda	27	+1:10.640	26	
17	25	(Spain) Maverick Viñales	FTR Honda	27	+1:11.122	24	
18	99	(United Kingdom) Danny Webb	Mahindra	27	+1:11.306	22	
19	44	(Portugal) Miguel Oliveira	Suter Honda	27	+1:18.878	31	
20	42	(Spain) Álex Rins	Suter Honda	27	+1:18.957	27	
21	32	(Spain) Isaac Viñales	FTR Honda	26	+1 lap	25	
22	3	(Italy) Luigi Morciano	Ioda	26	+1 lap	33	
23	51	(Japan) Kenta Fujii	TSR Honda	26	+1 lap	32	
24	5	(Italy) Romano Fenati	FTR Honda	26	+1 lap	35	
25	21	(Spain) Iván Moreno	FTR Honda	26	+1 lap	34	
26	86	(Germany) Kevin Hanus	Honda	26	+1 lap	28	
27	30	(Switzerland) Giulian Pedone	Suter Honda	24	+3 laps	29	
Ret	96	(France) Louis Rossi	FTR Honda	25	Retirement	7	
Ret	77	(Germany) Marcel Schrötter	Mahindra	24	Accident	30	
Ret	23	(Spain) Alberto Moncayo	Kalex KTM	23	Retirement	13	
Ret	52	(United Kingdom) Danny Kent	KTM	22	Retirement	2	
Ret	41	(South Africa) Brad Binder	Kalex KTM	21	Retirement	6	
Ret	26	(Spain) Adrián Martín	FTR Honda	20	Accident	3	
Ret	94	(Germany) Jonas Folger	Ioda	17	Retirement	8	
Ret	53	(Netherlands) Jasper Iwema	FGR Honda	16	Retirement	17	

== Championship standings after the race (MotoGP) ==
Below are the standings for the top five riders and constructors after round eight has concluded.

Riders' Championship standings

Pos.	Rider	Points
1	(Spain) Jorge Lorenzo	160
2	(Spain) Dani Pedrosa	146
3	(Australia) Casey Stoner	140
4	(Italy) Andrea Dovizioso	92
5	(United Kingdom) Cal Crutchlow	85

Constructors' Championship standings

Pos.	Constructor	Points
1	(Japan) Yamaha	176
2	(Japan) Honda	176
3	(Italy) Ducati	85
4	(Italy) ART	37
5	(United Kingdom) FTR	16

- Note: Only the top five positions are included for both sets of standings.

Previous race: 2012 Dutch TT	FIM Grand Prix World Championship; 2012 season	Next race: 2012 Italian Grand Prix
Previous race: 2011 German Grand Prix	German motorcycle Grand Prix	Next race: 2013 German Grand Prix
