= 2012 Italian motorcycle Grand Prix =

(Italy) 2012 Italian Grand Prix
Race details
- Race 9 of 18 races in the 2012 Grand Prix motorcycle racing season
- Date: 15 July 2012
- Official name: Gran Premio d'Italia TIM
- Location: Autodromo Internazionale del Mugello
- Course: Permanent racing facility; 5.245 km (3.259 mi)

MotoGP
Pole position
Rider	(Spain) Dani Pedrosa	Honda
Time	1:47.284	
Fastest lap
Rider	(Spain) Dani Pedrosa	Honda
Time	1:47.705	
Podium
First	(Spain) Jorge Lorenzo	Yamaha
Second	(Spain) Dani Pedrosa	Honda
Third	(Italy) Andrea Dovizioso	Yamaha

Moto2
Pole position
Rider	(Spain) Pol Espargaró	Kalex
Time	1:52.369	
Fastest lap
Rider	(Switzerland) Thomas Lüthi	Suter
Time	1:52.815	
Podium
First	(Italy) Andrea Iannone	Speed Up
Second	(Spain) Pol Espargaró	Kalex
Third	(Switzerland) Thomas Lüthi	Suter

Moto3
Pole position
Rider	(Spain) Maverick Viñales	FTR Honda
Time	1:57.980	
Fastest lap
Rider	(Germany) Sandro Cortese	KTM
Time	1:58.569	
Podium
First	(Spain) Maverick Viñales	FTR Honda
Second	(Italy) Romano Fenati	FTR Honda
Third	(Germany) Sandro Cortese	KTM

The 2012 Italian motorcycle Grand Prix was the ninth round of the 2012 Grand Prix motorcycle racing season. It took place on the weekend of 13–15 July 2012 at the Mugello Circuit.

== Classification ==
=== MotoGP ===
Pos.	No.	Rider	Team	Manufacturer	Laps	Time/Retired	Grid	Points
1	99	(Spain) Jorge Lorenzo	Yamaha Factory Racing	Yamaha	23	41:37.477	2	25
2	26	(Spain) Dani Pedrosa	Repsol Honda Team	Honda	23	+5.223	1	20
3	4	(Italy) Andrea Dovizioso	Monster Yamaha Tech 3	Yamaha	23	+10.665	7	16
4	6	(Germany) Stefan Bradl	LCR Honda MotoGP	Honda	23	+10.711	8	13
5	46	(Italy) Valentino Rossi	Ducati Team	Ducati	23	+11.695	10	11
6	35	(United Kingdom) Cal Crutchlow	Monster Yamaha Tech 3	Yamaha	23	+12.060	6	10
7	69	(United States) Nicky Hayden	Ducati Team	Ducati	23	+12.235	4	9
8	1	(Australia) Casey Stoner	Repsol Honda Team	Honda	23	+30.617	5	8
9	8	(Spain) Héctor Barberá	Pramac Racing Team	Ducati	23	+31.728	3	7
10	19	(Spain) Álvaro Bautista	San Carlo Honda Gresini	Honda	23	+34.589	11	6
11	11	(United States) Ben Spies	Yamaha Factory Racing	Yamaha	23	+57.862	9	5
12	14	(France) Randy de Puniet	Power Electronics Aspar	ART	23	+59.963	13	4
13	41	(Spain) Aleix Espargaró	Power Electronics Aspar	ART	23	+1:11.200	12	3
14	77	(United Kingdom) James Ellison	Paul Bird Motorsport	ART	23	+1:11.458	16	2
15	54	(Italy) Mattia Pasini	Speed Master	ART	23	+1:11.828	17	1
16	22	(Spain) Iván Silva	Avintia Blusens	BQR	22	+1 lap	18	
Ret	5	(United States) Colin Edwards	NGM Mobile Forward Racing	Suter	10	Retirement	19	
Ret	68	(Colombia) Yonny Hernández	Avintia Blusens	BQR	9	Retirement	15	
Ret	9	(Italy) Danilo Petrucci	Came IodaRacing Project	Ioda	3	Retirement	20	
DSQ	51	(Italy) Michele Pirro	San Carlo Honda Gresini	FTR		Disqualified	14	

=== Moto2 ===
Pos.	No.	Rider	Manufacturer	Laps	Time/Retired	Grid	Points
1	29	(Italy) Andrea Iannone	Speed Up	21	39:52.523	3	25
2	40	(Spain) Pol Espargaró	Kalex	21	+0.090	1	20
3	12	(Switzerland) Thomas Lüthi	Suter	21	+0.897	5	16
4	38	(United Kingdom) Bradley Smith	Tech 3	21	+1.025	6	13
5	93	(Spain) Marc Márquez	Suter	21	+3.796	2	11
6	45	(United Kingdom) Scott Redding	Kalex	21	+3.911	7	10
7	30	(Japan) Takaaki Nakagami	Kalex	21	+4.425	9	9
8	77	(Switzerland) Dominique Aegerter	Suter	21	+11.366	12	8
9	71	(Italy) Claudio Corti	Kalex	21	+12.817	14	7
10	5	(France) Johann Zarco	Motobi	21	+13.031	18^{1}	6
11	36	(Finland) Mika Kallio	Kalex	21	+13.129	22	5
12	4	(Switzerland) Randy Krummenacher	Kalex	21	+13.362	15	4
13	18	(Spain) Nicolás Terol	Suter	21	+15.199	10	3
14	60	(Spain) Julián Simón	Suter	21	+17.238	19	2
15	88	(Spain) Ricard Cardús	AJR	21	+36.556	20	1
16	14	(Thailand) Ratthapark Wilairot	Suter	21	+47.701	28	
17	72	(Japan) Yuki Takahashi	FTR	21	+51.966	13	
18	3	(Italy) Simone Corsi	FTR	21	+53.969	11	
19	8	(United Kingdom) Gino Rea	Suter	21	+54.654	25	
20	10	(Switzerland) Marco Colandrea	FTR	21	+1:08.279	30	
21	57	(Brazil) Eric Granado	Motobi	21	+1:14.807	32	
22	63	(France) Mike Di Meglio	MZ-RE Honda	21	+1 lap	16	
DSQ	95	(Australia) Anthony West	Speed Up	21	(+1 lap)	27	
Ret	24	(Spain) Toni Elías	Suter	14	Retirement	23	
Ret	44	(Italy) Roberto Rolfo	Suter	12	Retirement	24	
Ret	80	(Spain) Esteve Rabat	Kalex	10	Retirement	8	
Ret	55	(Italy) Massimo Roccoli	Bimota	8	Retirement	31	
Ret	49	(Spain) Axel Pons	Kalex	7	Retirement	21	
Ret	19	(Belgium) Xavier Siméon	Tech 3	7	Retirement	26	
Ret	82	(Spain) Elena Rosell	Moriwaki	6	Retirement	33	
Ret	22	(Italy) Alessandro Andreozzi	Speed Up	5	Retirement	29	
Ret	15	(San Marino) Alex de Angelis	FTR	2	Retirement	4	
Ret	76	(Germany) Max Neukirchner	Kalex	1	Retirement	17	
OFFICIAL MOTO2 REPORT

Notes:

- ^1 — Johann Zarco was given a fifteen-place grid penalty for riding in an irresponsible manner, following a collision with Pol Espargaró.

=== Moto3 ===
Pos.	No.	Rider	Manufacturer	Laps	Time/Retired	Grid	Points
1	25	(Spain) Maverick Viñales	FTR Honda	20	39:57.374	1	25
2	5	(Italy) Romano Fenati	FTR Honda	20	+0.020	8	20
3	11	(Germany) Sandro Cortese	KTM	20	+0.071	2	16
4	27	(Italy) Niccolò Antonelli	FTR Honda	20	+5.788	6	13
5	52	(United Kingdom) Danny Kent	KTM	20	+5.836	5	11
6	7	(Spain) Efrén Vázquez	FTR Honda	20	+5.860	4	10
7	42	(Spain) Álex Rins	Suter Honda	20	+5.906	3	9
8	84	(Czech Republic) Jakub Kornfeil	FTR Honda	20	+18.195	13	8
9	63	(Malaysia) Zulfahmi Khairuddin	KTM	20	+19.232	7	7
10	55	(Spain) Héctor Faubel	Kalex KTM	20	+19.308	10	6
11	31	(Finland) Niklas Ajo	KTM	20	+35.855	28	5
12	10	(France) Alexis Masbou	Honda	20	+35.872	17	4
13	26	(Spain) Adrián Martín	FTR Honda	20	+36.175	24	3
14	74	(Italy) Kevin Calia	Honda	20	+36.195	15	2
15	71	(Italy) Michael Ruben Rinaldi	Honda	20	+36.270	20	1
16	19	(Italy) Alessandro Tonucci	FTR Honda	20	+36.285	19	
17	89	(France) Alan Techer	TSR Honda	20	+36.446	14	
18	9	(Germany) Toni Finsterbusch	Honda	20	+36.651	21	
19	32	(Spain) Isaac Viñales	FTR Honda	20	+51.252	23	
20	99	(United Kingdom) Danny Webb	Mahindra	20	+57.030	32	
21	8	(Australia) Jack Miller	Honda	20	+57.136	25	
22	15	(Italy) Simone Grotzkyj	Suter Honda	20	+57.148	27	
23	30	(Switzerland) Giulian Pedone	Suter Honda	20	+57.151	22	
24	41	(South Africa) Brad Binder	Kalex KTM	20	+1:07.228	18	
25	51	(Japan) Kenta Fujii	TSR Honda	20	+1:23.679	35	
26	21	(Spain) Iván Moreno	FTR Honda	20	+1:31.341	30	
27	3	(Italy) Luigi Morciano	Ioda	20	+1:55.845	34	
Ret	44	(Portugal) Miguel Oliveira	Suter Honda	12	Retirement	16	
Ret	53	(Netherlands) Jasper Iwema	FGR Honda	8	Retirement	31	
Ret	94	(Germany) Jonas Folger	Ioda	6	Retirement	26	
Ret	61	(Australia) Arthur Sissis	KTM	4	Retirement	29	
Ret	23	(Spain) Alberto Moncayo	Kalex KTM	3	Retirement	12	
Ret	39	(Spain) Luis Salom	Kalex KTM	3	Retirement	9	
Ret	96	(France) Louis Rossi	FTR Honda	1	Retirement	11	
Ret	20	(Italy) Riccardo Moretti	Mahindra	0	Retirement	33	
OFFICIAL MOTO3 REPORT

== Championship standings after the race (MotoGP) ==
Below are the standings for the top five riders and constructors after round nine has concluded.

Riders' Championship standings

Pos.	Rider	Points
1	(Spain) Jorge Lorenzo	185
2	(Spain) Dani Pedrosa	166
3	(Australia) Casey Stoner	148
4	(Italy) Andrea Dovizioso	108
5	(United Kingdom) Cal Crutchlow	95

Constructors' Championship standings

Pos.	Constructor	Points
1	(Japan) Yamaha	201
2	(Japan) Honda	196
3	(Italy) Ducati	96
4	(Italy) ART	41
5	(United Kingdom) FTR	16

- Note: Only the top five positions are included for both sets of standings.

Previous race: 2012 German Grand Prix	FIM Grand Prix World Championship; 2012 season	Next race: 2012 United States Grand Prix
Previous race: 2011 Italian Grand Prix	Italian motorcycle Grand Prix	Next race: 2013 Italian Grand Prix
