= Danilo Petrucci =

Italian motorcycle racer

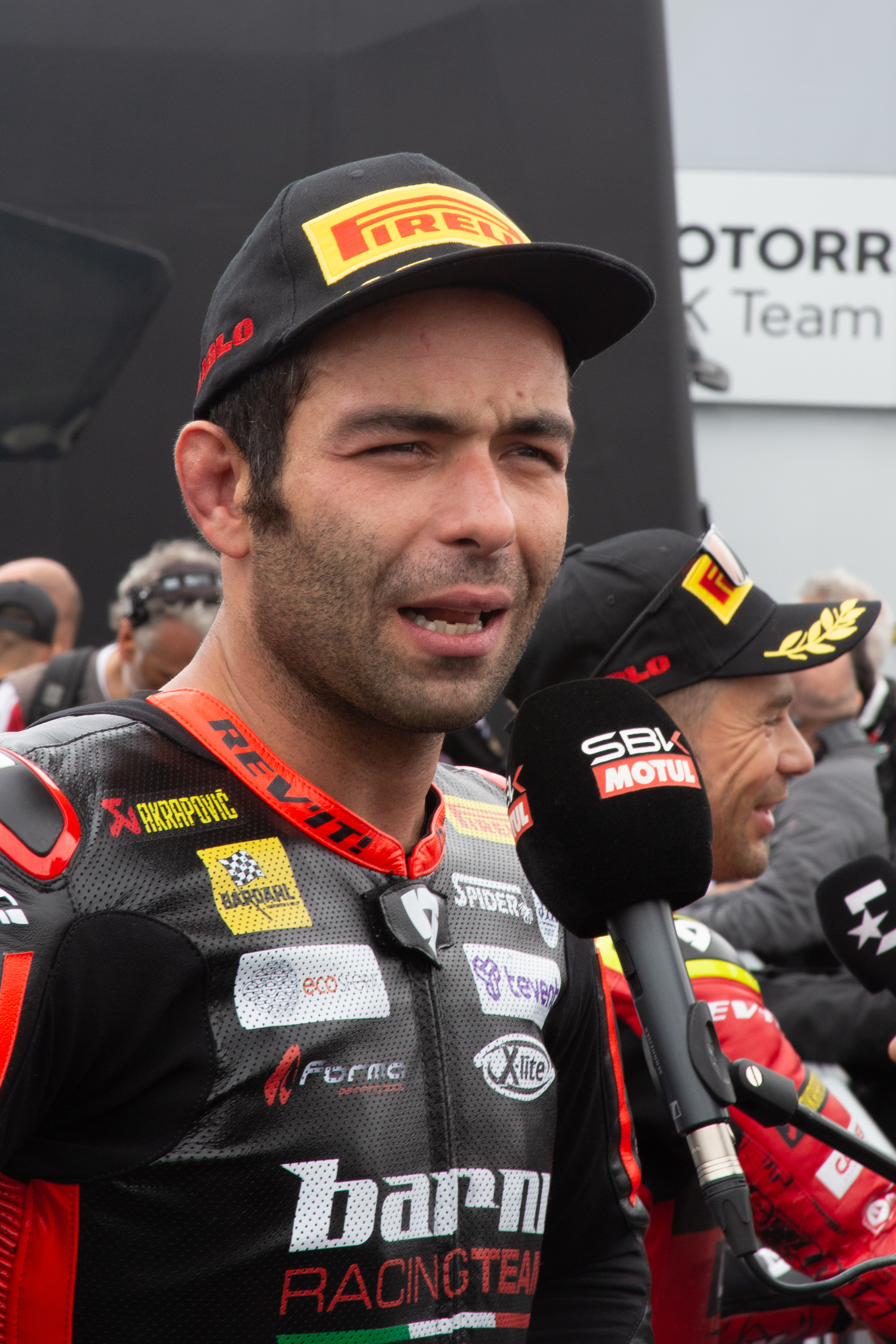
- Petrucci at Donington in 2023
- Nationality: Italian
- Born: 24 October 1990 (age 36); Terni, Italy
- Current team: ROKiT BMW Motorrad WorldSBK Team
- Bike number: 9
- Website: DaniloPetrucci.it
Motorcycle racing career statistics
MotoGP World Championship
| Active years | 2012–2023 |
| Manufacturers | Ioda, Ioda-Suter (2012–2013); ART (2014); Ducati (2015–2020, 2023); KTM (2021); Suzuki (2022) |
| Championships | 0 |
| 2023 championship position | 28th (5 pts) |
Starts / Wins / Podiums / Poles / F. laps / Points; 171 / 2 / 10 / 0 / 2 / 822
Superbike World Championship
| Active years | 2023–2026 |
| Manufacturers | Ducati (2023–2025); BMW (2026) |
| Championships | 0 |
| 2026 championship position | 17th (61 points) |
Starts / Wins / Podiums / Poles / F. laps / Points; 126 / 3 / 20 / 0 / 1 / 850

Danilo Carlo Petrucci (born 24 October 1990) is an Italian motorcycle racer who most recently competed in the Superbike World Championship for the factory BMW Motorrad WorldSBK team. He raced in MotoGP from 2012 until 2021, and won two races in the premier class, one on home soil in Mugello. Petrucci was the Italian Superbike Champion (CIV) in 2011, and winner of the 2024 and 2025 Independents Cup in the Superbike World Championship.

After losing his KTM ride in MotoGP at the end of the 2021 season, Petrucci entered the 2022 Dakar Rally with a Tech3 KTM rally raid 450 cc machine in January 2022. He won stage 5, and became the first former MotoGP rider to win a stage at the rally.

For the majority of 2022, Petrucci was based in Scranton, Pennsylvania, United States, riding a Ducati Panigale V4R for Warhorse HSBK Racing Ducati New York in the 2022 MotoAmerica Superbike Championship. He won five races, and finished second in the final standings.

In November of 2022, it was announced that Petrucci would return to the Barni Ducati team, this time in the Superbike World Championship. He raced in the championship from 2023 until 2026, with Ducati and BMW.

== Career ==
=== Early career ===
Born in Terni, Petrucci began racing in 1998 with mini-trial and mini-cross bikes, achieving some national trophies. In 2006, he switched to road racing entering the CBR600 Cup where he emerged as the best rookie. In 2007, Petrucci competed in the Yamaha R6 Cup and made some appearances in the European Superstock 600 Championship. His runner-up position in the R6 Cup granted him official support from Yamaha Motor Italia for the following seasons. In 2008, Petrucci contested his first full international season in the European Superstock 600 championship, scoring two poles and earning seventh place overall in the final championships standings. In 2009, he won three races and earned fourth place overall in the European championship; in the same season he became runner-up in the Italian Superstock 1000 championship and won the Under-23 class. In 2010, Petrucci entered the FIM Superstock 1000 Championship riding for Team Pedercini, while competing also for the Italian Superbike Championship. In the latter championship, he finished in third place overall and won the Under-25 title. In 2011, he again competed in the FIM Superstock 1000 Championship, riding a Ducati 1098R entered by the Barni Racing Team. With four victories and six poles, he ended the season as runner-up behind Davide Giugliano. He also contested the Italian Superstock 1000 championship, winning the championship title.

=== MotoGP World Championship ===
==== Came IodaRacing Project (2012–2014) ====
Petrucci joined the Ioda team in the MotoGP class in 2012, riding a Claiming Rule Teams (CRT) motorcycle with an in-house Ioda chassis and an Aprilia RSV4 engine. The team switched to using a Suter chassis and BMW engines midway through the season. Petrucci finished 19th overall in the championship and seventh in the CRT class with 27 points.

Ioda continued with Suter/BMW machinery and expanded their MotoGP team to field two bikes in 2013, with Lukáš Pešek as the second rider. Petrucci finished 17th overall in the championship and fifth in the CRT class with 26 points.

Petrucci remained with Ioda for the 2014 season, however the team dropped back to a single entry in the championship and returned to Aprilia machinery. Petrucci suffered a fractured wrist from a crash during the warm-up session for the Spanish Grand Prix at Jerez. Michel Fabrizio replaced Petrucci for rounds 6 and 7. Petrucci returned for the Dutch TT at Assen. Petrucci eventually finished 20th overall in the championship and fifth in the Open class with 17 points.

==== Pramac Racing (2015–2018) ====
On 1 October 2014, it was announced that Petrucci would leave the Ioda team and move to Pramac Racing with a two-year contract, starting with the 2015 season. He replaced Andrea Iannone, who moved to the factory Ducati Team. Petrucci took his first podium finish at the British Grand Prix in August. After starting 18th on the grid, Petrucci moved through the order in wet conditions, and ultimately finished second behind Valentino Rossi.

Petrucci missed the first four races after suffering a broken hand in a pre-season testing crash at Phillip Island. Upon his return, he once again excelled in wet conditions during Dutch TT where he set the fastest lap and briefly led before the race was stopped (he ultimately retired with an electrical failure).

Petrucci started his sixth consecutive season in Motogp for Pramac, but riding a factory spec bike and with the same teammate from 2016. On 4 June 2017, he claimed third at the Italian Grand Prix. At Assen, he managed to get on the podium again, finishing second, repeating as runner-up in the San Marino Grand Prix. In Japan, he finished third. He ended the season in eighth place with 124 points.

In 2018, Petrucci was paired with Jack Miller. In France, he finished in second place, ultimately finishing the season in eighth place with 144 points.

==== Ducati Team (2019–2020) ====
In 2019, Petrucci moved to the Ducati factory team to pair with Andrea Dovizioso. He finished in third place at Le Mans. He achieved his first victory in MotoGP in the following race at Mugello. He finished in third place at Catalunya. He ended the season in sixth place with 176 points.

In 2020, Petrucci remained with the same team. He won at Le Mans in wet race conditions after being in the lead from start to finish. He ended the season in 12th place with 78 points.

==== Tech3 KTM Factory Racing (2021) ====
For the 2021 season, Petrucci was signed by the KTM satellite team Tech3. He had a best result of fifth place throughout the season and finished 21st in the standings with 37 points. At the Styrian GP in August, news broke that he had lost his ride and would be exiting MotoGP at the end of the season.

==== Team Suzuki Ecstar (2022) ====
On 26 September 2022, it was announced that Petrucci would replace the injured Joan Mir for the Thailand Grand Prix in Buriram, after the US Superbike season had ended. Petrucci finished in 20th, in front of one regular rider and one replacement, and later confirmed he had no team arrangements for 2023.

=== Dakar Rally ===
Petrucci suffered a broken leg training for the Dakar Rally in December 2021. During the 2022 event, he placed 23rd in the prologue event, followed by 13th in the first stage. He retired from the second stage with a mechanical failure after 117 kilometres (73 mi), and had to be rescued by helicopter. Petrucci continued on in the rally after a nearly 12-hour time penalty for his failure to finish the stage. On stage five, Petrucci took his first Dakar stage victory, after fellow KTM rider Toby Price received a time penalty.

In 2025, Petrucci returned to the Dakar as a technician in the Trucks category for MM Technology alongside fellow Italians Claudio Bellina and Marco Arnoletti in an Iveco PowerStar. Petrucci also briefly drove the truck, before the team retired for health reasons for Bellina.

=== MotoAmerica Superbike Championship ===
Petrucci won both legs of his inaugural race in the 2022 MotoAmerica Superbike Championship at COTA, near Austin, Texas, on the weekend of 9 and 10 April.

Petrucci won the first leg of two at Road Atlanta in late April, leading the championship on points. His Ducati suffered an engine failure in the second leg.

Petrucci finished the season and AMA championship in second place to Jake Gagne in September 2022.

=== Superbike World Championship ===
==== Barni Spark Ducati Racing Team (from 2023) ====
Petrucci competed for the Barni Ducati Team from 2023 Superbike World Championship season, finishing seventh overall with three podium finishes.

In 2024, Petrucci improved his results to fifth overall with 10 podiums, including a sweep of all three racing sessions at the inaugural Italian round at Cremona Circuit.

==== ROKiT BMW Motorrad WorldSBK Team (from 2026) ====
BMW announced Petrucci would compete for ROKiT BMW Motorrad WorldSBK Team in 2026 on the BMW M 1000 RR, replacing Toprak Razgatlioglu, who would make his MotoGP debut with Yamaha next season.

== Career statistics ==
=== Career summary ===
| Season | Series | Team | Bike | Races | Poles | Wins | Points | Position |
|---|---|---|---|---|---|---|---|---|
| 2007 | European Superstock 600 Championship | Imperiale Moto | Yamaha | 3 | 0 | 0 | 8 | 27th |
| 2008 | European Superstock 600 Championship | Team Trasimeno | Yamaha | 9 | 2 | 0 | 83 | 7th |
| 2009 | European Superstock 600 Championship | Yamaha Italia Jr. Trasimeno | Yamaha | 10 | 4 | 3 | 146 | 4th |
| 2010 | Superstock 1000 Cup | Team Pedercini | Kawasaki | 10 | 0 | 0 | 63 | 9th |
| 2011 | Superstock 1000 Cup | Barni Racing Team | Ducati | 10 | 6 | 4 | 169 | **2nd** |
| 2012 | MotoGP | Came IodaRacing Project | Ioda | 12 | 0 | 0 | 9 | 19th |
| 2012 | MotoGP | Came IodaRacing Project | Ioda-Suter | 6 | 0 | 0 | 18 | 19th |
| 2013 | MotoGP | Came IodaRacing Project | Ioda-Suter | 18 | 0 | 0 | 26 | 17th |
| 2014 | MotoGP | IodaRacing Project | ART | 14 | 0 | 0 | 17 | 20th |
| 2015 | MotoGP | Pramac Racing | Ducati | 18 | 0 | 0 | 113 | 10th |
| 2016 | MotoGP | Pramac Racing | Ducati | 14 | 0 | 0 | 75 | 14th |
| 2017 | MotoGP | Pramac Racing | Ducati | 18 | 0 | 0 | 124 | 8th |
| 2018 | MotoGP | Pramac Racing | Ducati | 18 | 0 | 0 | 144 | 8th |
| 2019 | MotoGP | Ducati Team | Ducati | 19 | 0 | 1 | 176 | 6th |
| 2020 | MotoGP | Ducati Team | Ducati | 14 | 0 | 1 | 78 | 12th |
| 2021 | MotoGP | Tech3 KTM Factory Racing | KTM | 18 | 0 | 0 | 37 | 21st |
| 2022 | MotoAmerica Superbike | Warhorse HSBK Racing Ducati New York | Ducati | 20 | 4 | 5 | 356 | **2nd** |
| 2022 | MotoGP | Team Suzuki Ecstar | Suzuki | 1 | 0 | 0 | 0 | 30th |
| 2023 | World Superbike | Barni Spark Racing Team | Ducati | 22 | 0 | 0 | 133 | 6th |
| 2023 | MotoGP | Ducati Team | Ducati | 1 | 0 | 0 | 5 | 22nd |
| 2024 | World Superbike | Barni Spark Racing Team | Ducati | 33 | 0 | 3 | 307 | 5th |
| 2025 | World Superbike | Barni Spark Racing Team | Ducati | 30 | 0 | 0 | 284 | 5th |

=== European Superstock 600 ===
==== Races by year ====
(key) (Races in bold indicate pole position, races in italics indicate fastest lap)

| Year | Bike | 1 | 2 | 3 | 4 | 5 | 6 | 7 | 8 | 9 | 10 | 11 | 12 | Pos | Pts |
|---|---|---|---|---|---|---|---|---|---|---|---|---|---|---|---|
| 2007 | Yamaha | DON | SPA | ASS | MNZ; Ret | SIL; C | MIS; Ret | BRN | BRA | BRA | LAU; 8 | VAL | MAG | 28th | 8 |
| 2008 | Yamaha | VAL; 2 | ASS; Ret | MNZ; 4 | NÜR; 8 | MIS; 7 | BRN; 10 | BRA; 4 | DON; DNS | MAG; 11 | POR; 7 | | | 7th | 83 |
| 2009 | Yamaha | VAL; 1 | ASS; Ret | MNZ; 1 | MIS; 1 | SIL; 9 | BRN; 2 | NÜR; 2 | IMO; 4 | MAG; 18 | POR; 5 | | | 4th | 146 |

=== FIM Superstock 1000 Cup ===
==== Races by year ====
(key) (Races in bold indicate pole position; races in italics indicate fastest lap)

| Year | Bike | 1 | 2 | 3 | 4 | 5 | 6 | 7 | 8 | 9 | 10 | Pos | Pts |
|---|---|---|---|---|---|---|---|---|---|---|---|---|---|
| 2010 | Kawasaki | POR; 9 | SPA; 13 | NED; 7 | ITA; 5 | SMR; 10 | CZE; Ret | GBR; 9 | GER; 13 | ITA; 7 | FRA; 8 | 9th | 63 |
| 2011 | Ducati | NED; 2 | ITA; 4 | **SMR**; 2 | **SPA**; 3 | **CZE**; Ret | **GBR**; 1 | GER; Ret | ITA; 1 | **FRA**; 1 | **POR**; 1 | 2nd | 169 |

=== Grand Prix motorcycle racing ===
==== By season ====
| Season | Class | Motorcycle | Team | Race | Win | Podium | Pole | FLap | Pts | Plcd |
|---|---|---|---|---|---|---|---|---|---|---|
| 2012 | MotoGP | Ioda | Came IodaRacing Project | 12 | 0 | 0 | 0 | 0 | 9 | 19th |
| 2012 | MotoGP | Ioda-Suter | Came IodaRacing Project | 6 | 0 | 0 | 0 | 0 | 18 | 19th |
| 2013 | MotoGP | Ioda-Suter | Came IodaRacing Project | 18 | 0 | 0 | 0 | 0 | 26 | 17th |
| 2014 | MotoGP | ART | Octo IodaRacing Team | 14 | 0 | 0 | 0 | 0 | 17 | 20th |
| 2015 | MotoGP | Ducati Desmosedici GP14 | Octo Pramac Racing | 18 | 0 | 1 | 0 | 0 | 113 | 10th |
| 2016 | MotoGP | Ducati Desmosedici GP15 | Octo Pramac Yakhnich | 14 | 0 | 0 | 0 | 1 | 75 | 14th |
| 2017 | MotoGP | Ducati Desmosedici GP17 | Octo Pramac Racing | 18 | 0 | 4 | 0 | 0 | 124 | 8th |
| 2018 | MotoGP | Ducati Desmosedici GP18 | Alma Pramac Racing | 18 | 0 | 1 | 0 | 1 | 144 | 8th |
| 2019 | MotoGP | Ducati Desmosedici GP19 | Ducati Team | 19 | 1 | 3 | 0 | 0 | 176 | 6th |
| 2020 | MotoGP | Ducati Desmosedici GP20 | Ducati Team | 14 | 1 | 1 | 0 | 0 | 78 | 12th |
| 2021 | MotoGP | KTM RC16 | Tech3 KTM Factory Racing | 18 | 0 | 0 | 0 | 0 | 37 | 21st |
| 2022 | MotoGP | Suzuki GSX-RR | Team Suzuki Ecstar | 1 | 0 | 0 | 0 | 0 | 0 | 30th |
| 2023 | MotoGP | Ducati Desmosedici GP23 | Ducati Lenovo Team | 1 | 0 | 0 | 0 | 0 | 5 | 22nd |
| Total | | | | **171** | **2** | **10** | **0** | **2** | **822** | |

==== By class ====
| Class | Seasons | 1st GP | 1st pod | 1st win | Race | Win | Podiums | Pole | FLap | Pts | WChmp |
|---|---|---|---|---|---|---|---|---|---|---|---|
| MotoGP | 2012–2023 | 2012 Qatar | 2015 Great Britain | 2019 Italy | 171 | 2 | 10 | 0 | 2 | 822 | 0 |
| Total | 2012–2023 | | | | **171** | **2** | **10** | **0** | **2** | **822** | **0** |

==== Races by year ====
(key) (Races in bold indicate pole position, races in italics indicate fastest lap)

| Year | Class | Bike | 1 | 2 | 3 | 4 | 5 | 6 | 7 | 8 | 9 | 10 | 11 | 12 | 13 | 14 | 15 | 16 | 17 | 18 | 19 | 20 | Pos | Pts |
|---|---|---|---|---|---|---|---|---|---|---|---|---|---|---|---|---|---|---|---|---|---|---|---|---|
| 2012 | MotoGP | Ioda | QAT; Ret | SPA; 13 | POR; 15 | FRA; Ret | CAT; 19 | GBR; 17 | NED; 11 | GER; 17 | ITA; Ret | USA; Ret | INP; Ret | CZE; 17 | | | | | | | | | 19th | 27 |
| 2012 | MotoGP | Ioda-Suter | | | | | | | | | | | | | RSM; 14 | ARA; 17 | JPN; Ret | MAL; 11 | AUS; 13 | VAL; 8 | | | 19th | 27 |
| 2013 | MotoGP | Ioda-Suter | QAT; Ret | AME; Ret | SPA; 14 | FRA; 14 | ITA; 12 | CAT; 11 | NED; 16 | GER; 14 | USA; 13 | INP; 17 | CZE; 13 | GBR; 15 | RSM; 15 | ARA; Ret | MAL; 16 | AUS; 15 | JPN; 18 | VAL; 14 | | | 17th | 26 |
| 2014 | MotoGP | ART | QAT; 14 | AME; 17 | ARG; Ret | SPA; DNS | FRA | ITA | CAT | NED; 15 | GER; 15 | INP; Ret | CZE; Ret | GBR; 18 | RSM; Ret | ARA; 11 | JPN; Ret | AUS; 12 | MAL; Ret | VAL; 12 | | | 20th | 17 |
| 2015 | MotoGP | Ducati | QAT; 12 | AME; 10 | ARG; 11 | SPA; 12 | FRA; 10 | ITA; 9 | CAT; 9 | NED; 11 | GER; 9 | INP; 10 | CZE; 10 | GBR; 2 | RSM; 6 | ARA; Ret | JPN; Ret | AUS; 12 | MAL; 6 | VAL; 10 | | | 10th | 113 |
| 2016 | MotoGP | Ducati | QAT; DNS | ARG | AME | SPA | FRA; 7 | ITA; 8 | CAT; 9 | NED; Ret | GER; Ret | AUT; 11 | CZE; 7 | GBR; 9 | RSM; 11 | ARA; 17 | JPN; 8 | AUS; 9 | MAL; 10 | VAL; 12 | | | 14th | 75 |
| 2017 | MotoGP | Ducati | QAT; Ret | ARG; 7 | AME; 8 | SPA; 7 | FRA; Ret | ITA; 3 | CAT; Ret | NED; 2 | GER; 12 | CZE; 7 | AUT; Ret | GBR; Ret | RSM; 2 | ARA; 20 | JPN; 3 | AUS; 21 | MAL; 6 | VAL; 13 | | | 8th | 124 |
| 2018 | MotoGP | Ducati | QAT; 5 | ARG; 10 | AME; 12 | SPA; 4 | FRA; 2 | ITA; 7 | CAT; 8 | NED; Ret | GER; 4 | CZE; 6 | AUT; 5 | GBR; C | RSM; 11 | ARA; 7 | THA; 9 | JPN; 9 | AUS; 12 | MAL; 9 | VAL; Ret | | 8th | 144 |
| 2019 | MotoGP | Ducati | QAT; 6 | ARG; 6 | AME; 6 | SPA; 5 | FRA; 3 | ITA; 1 | CAT; 3 | NED; 6 | GER; 4 | CZE; 8 | AUT; 9 | GBR; 7 | RSM; 10 | ARA; 12 | THA; 9 | JPN; 9 | AUS; Ret | MAL; 9 | VAL; Ret | | 6th | 176 |
| 2020 | MotoGP | Ducati | SPA; 9 | ANC; Ret | CZE; 12 | AUT; 7 | STY; 11 | RSM; 16 | EMI; 10 | CAT; 8 | FRA; 1 | ARA; 15 | TER; 10 | EUR; 10 | VAL; 15 | POR; 16 | | | | | | | 12th | 78 |
| 2021 | MotoGP | KTM | QAT; Ret | DOH; 19 | POR; 13 | SPA; 14 | FRA; 5 | ITA; 9 | CAT; Ret | GER; Ret | NED; 13 | STY; 18 | AUT; 12 | GBR; 10 | ARA; 15 | RSM; 16 | AME; 18 | EMI; Ret | ALR; Ret | VAL; 18 | | | 21st | 37 |
| 2022 | MotoGP | Suzuki | QAT | INA | ARG | AME | POR | SPA | FRA | ITA | CAT | GER | NED | GBR | AUT | RSM | ARA | JPN | THA; 20 | AUS | MAL | VAL | 30th | 0 |
| 2023 | MotoGP | Ducati | POR | ARG | AME | SPA | FRA; 11 | ITA | GER | NED | GBR | AUT | CAT | RSM | IND | JPN | INA | AUS | THA | MAL | QAT | VAL | 28th | 5 |

=== Superbike World Championship ===
==== By season ====
| Season | Motorcycle | Team | Race | Win | Podium | Pole | FLap | Pts | Plcd |
|---|---|---|---|---|---|---|---|---|---|
| 2023 | Ducati Panigale V4 R | Barni Spark Racing Team | 36 | 0 | 3 | 0 | 0 | 228 | 7th |
| 2024 | Ducati Panigale V4 R | Barni Spark Racing Team | 33 | 3 | 10 | 0 | 1 | 307 | 5th |
| 2025 | Ducati Panigale V4 R | Barni Spark Racing Team | 30 | 0 | 7 | 0 | 0 | 284 | 5th |
| 2026 | BMW M1000RR | ROKiT BMW Motorrad WorldSBK Team | 6 | 0 | 0 | 0 | 0 | 31* | 8th* |
| Total | | | **105** | **3** | **20** | **0** | **1** | **850** | |

==== Races by year ====
(key) (Races in bold indicate pole position) (Races in italics indicate fastest lap)

| Year | Bike | 1 | | | 2 | | | 3 | | | 4 | | | 5 | | | 6 | | | 7 | | | 8 | | | 9 | | | 10 | | | 11 | | | 12 | | | Pos | Pts |
| Year | Bike | R1 | SR | R2 | R1 | SR | R2 | R1 | SR | R2 | R1 | SR | R2 | R1 | SR | R2 | R1 | SR | R2 | R1 | SR | R2 | R1 | SR | R2 | R1 | SR | R2 | R1 | SR | R2 | R1 | SR | R2 | R1 | SR | R2 | Pos | Pts |
|---|---|---|---|---|---|---|---|---|---|---|---|---|---|---|---|---|---|---|---|---|---|---|---|---|---|---|---|---|---|---|---|---|---|---|---|---|---|---|---|
| 2023 | Ducati | AUS; 8 | AUS; 11 | AUS; 9 | INA; 5 | INA; 11 | INA; 6 | NED; 9 | NED; 15 | NED; 8 | SPA; DSQ | SPA; 11 | SPA; 12 | EMI; Ret | EMI; NC | EMI; 7 | GBR; 4 | GBR; 5 | GBR; 3 | ITA; 6 | ITA; 8 | ITA; 9 | CZE; 3 | CZE; 8 | CZE; 2 | FRA; 5 | FRA; 5 | FRA; 7 | SPA; 5 | SPA; 12 | SPA; Ret | POR; 12 | POR; 15 | POR; 6 | ESP; 5 | ESP; 9 | ESP; 5 | 7th | 228 |
| 2024 | Ducati | AUS; 8 | AUS; 15 | AUS; 3 | SPA; 7 | SPA; 7 | SPA; 5 | NED | NED | NED | MIS; 9 | MIS; 9 | MIS; 6 | GBR; 7 | GBR; 9 | GBR; 6 | CZE; 2 | CZE; 4 | CZE; Ret | POR; 3 | POR; 2 | POR; 5 | FRA; 3 | FRA; 3 | FRA; 2 | ITA; 1 | ITA; 1 | ITA; 1 | SPA; 5 | SPA; 6 | SPA; 6 | POR; Ret | POR; 5 | POR; 7 | SPA; Ret | SPA; 4 | SPA; 6 | 5th | 307 |
| 2025 | Ducati | AUS; 4 | AUS; 3 | AUS; 5 | POR; 4 | POR; 4 | POR; 6 | NED; 3 | NED; 13 | NED; 11 | ITA; 7 | ITA; 6 | ITA; 4 | CZE; 3 | CZE; 3 | CZE; 3 | EMI; 3 | EMI; 4 | EMI; 5 | GBR; 3 | GBR; 7 | GBR; 5 | HUN; 5 | HUN; 10 | HUN; 4 | FRA; 4 | FRA; 4 | FRA; 8 | ARA; 4 | ARA; 7 | ARA; 8 | POR; WD | POR; WD | POR; WD | SPA | SPA | SPA | 5th | 284 |
| 2026 | BMW | AUS; 10 | AUS; 10 | AUS; 6 | POR; 10 | POR; 12 | POR; 7 | NED | NED | NED | HUN | HUN | HUN | CZE | CZE | CZE | ARA | ARA | ARA | EMI | EMI | EMI | GBR | GBR | GBR | FRA | FRA | FRA | ITA | ITA | ITA | POR | POR | POR | SPA | SPA | SPA | 8th* | 31* |

* Season still in progress.

=== AMA Superbike Championship ===
==== Races by season ====
| Season | Class | Motorcycle | Team | Race | Win | Podium | Pole | FLap | Pts | Plcd |
|---|---|---|---|---|---|---|---|---|---|---|
| 2022 | Superbike | Ducati | Warhorse HSBK Racing Ducati New York | 20 | 5 | 16 | 0 | 0 | 356 | 2nd |
| Total | | | | **20** | **5** | **16** | **0** | **0** | **356** | |

==== Races by year ====
| Season | Team | Bike | Round | | | | | | | | | | | | | | | | | | | | Plcd. | Pts. |
| 2022 | Warhorse HSBK Racing Ducati New York | Ducati | TEX (Texas) | | ATL (Georgia (U.S. state)) | | VIR (Virginia) | | RAM (Wisconsin) | | RID (Washington (state)) | | MON (California) | | BRA (Minnesota) | | PIT (Pennsylvania) | | NJE (New Jersey) | | ALA (Alabama) | | 2nd | 356 |
| 2022 | Warhorse HSBK Racing Ducati New York | Ducati | R1 | R2 | R1 | R2 | R1 | R2 | R1 | R2 | R1 | R2 | R1 | R2 | R1 | R2 | R1 | R2 | R1 | R2 | R1 | R2 | 2nd | 356 |
|---|---|---|---|---|---|---|---|---|---|---|---|---|---|---|---|---|---|---|---|---|---|---|---|---|
| 2022 | Warhorse HSBK Racing Ducati New York | Ducati | 1 | 1 | 1 | Ret | 4 | 3 | 2 | 3 | 3 | 2 | 3 | 2 | 3 | 1 | 2 | 3 | 4 | 1 | 3 | 4 | 2nd | 356 |

=== Dakar Rally ===
==== Motorbike ====
| Year | Class | Vehicle | Position | Stages won |
|---|---|---|---|---|
| 2022 | Motorbike | (Austria) KTM | 90th | 1 |

==== Truck ====
| Year | Class | Vehicle | Team | Position | Stages won |
|---|---|---|---|---|---|
| 2025 | Truck | (Italy) Iveco | Italtrans Dakar Rally | DNF | 0 |

- Co-driver for Claudio Bellina
