= 2012 Indianapolis motorcycle Grand Prix =

2012 Indianapolis Grand Prix
Race details
- Race 11 of 18 races in the 2012 Grand Prix motorcycle racing season
- Date: August 19, 2012
- Official name: Red Bull Indianapolis Grand Prix
- Location: Indianapolis Motor Speedway
- Course: Permanent racing facility; 4.216 km (2.620 mi)

MotoGP
Pole position
Rider	(Spain) Dani Pedrosa	Honda
Time	1:38.813	
Fastest lap
Rider	(Spain) Dani Pedrosa	Honda
Time	1:39.088	
Podium
First	(Spain) Dani Pedrosa	Honda
Second	(Spain) Jorge Lorenzo	Yamaha
Third	(Italy) Andrea Dovizioso	Yamaha

Moto2
Pole position
Rider	(Spain) Pol Espargaró	Kalex
Time	1:42.602	
Fastest lap
Rider	(Spain) Marc Márquez	Suter
Time	1:43.304	
Podium
First	(Spain) Marc Márquez	Suter
Second	(Spain) Pol Espargaró	Kalex
Third	(Spain) Julián Simón	Suter

Moto3
Pole position
Rider	(Germany) Sandro Cortese	KTM
Time	1:48.545	
Fastest lap
Rider	(Italy) Romano Fenati	FTR Honda
Time	1:48.648	
Podium
First	(Spain) Luis Salom	Kalex KTM
Second	(Germany) Sandro Cortese	KTM
Third	(Germany) Jonas Folger	Kalex KTM

The 2012 Indianapolis motorcycle Grand Prix (formally the 2012 Red Bull Indianapolis Grand Prix) was the eleventh round of the 2012 Grand Prix motorcycle racing season. It was held on August 19, 2012, at the Indianapolis Motor Speedway in Indianapolis, Indiana.

After being absent from the United States Grand Prix at Laguna Seca, the Moto2 and Moto3 classes returned to competition at Indianapolis.

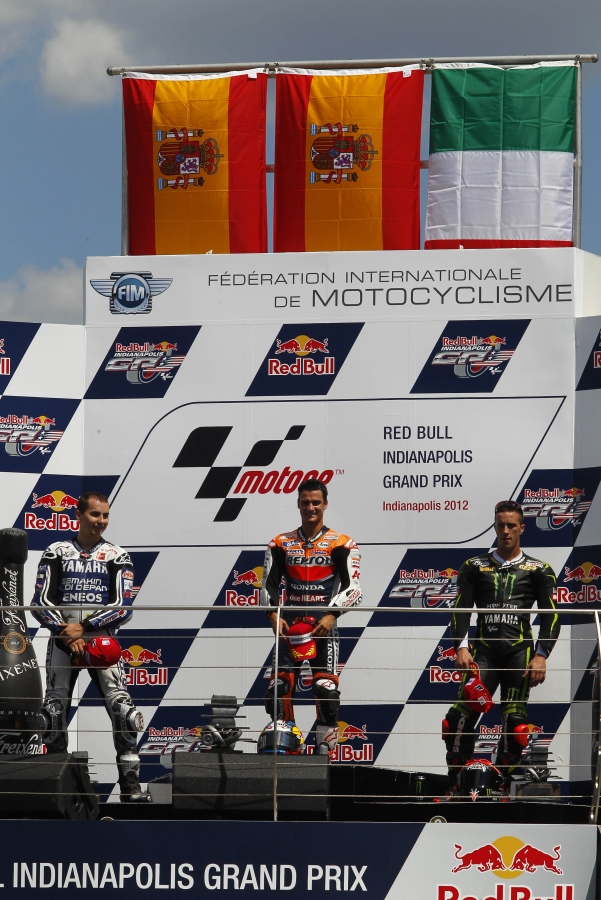
Jorge Lorenzo, Dani Pedrosa and Andrea Dovizioso, celebrating on the podium after finishing in second, first and third place at the MotoGP race.

== Classification ==
=== MotoGP ===
Pos.	No.	Rider	Team	Manufacturer	Laps	Time/Retired	Grid	Points
1	26	(Spain) Dani Pedrosa	Repsol Honda Team	Honda	28	46:39.631	1	25
2	99	(Spain) Jorge Lorenzo	Yamaha Factory Racing	Yamaha	28	+10.823	2	20
3	4	(Italy) Andrea Dovizioso	Monster Yamaha Tech 3	Yamaha	28	+17.310	3	16
4	1	(Australia) Casey Stoner	Repsol Honda Team	Honda	28	+19.803	6	13
5	19	(Spain) Álvaro Bautista	San Carlo Honda Gresini	Honda	28	+22.556	8	11
6	6	(Germany) Stefan Bradl	LCR Honda MotoGP	Honda	28	+30.072	5	10
7	46	(Italy) Valentino Rossi	Ducati Team	Ducati	28	+57.614	10	9
8	17	(Czech Republic) Karel Abraham	Cardion AB Motoracing	Ducati	28	+1:08.442	13	8
9	68	(Colombia) Yonny Hernández	Avintia Blusens	BQR	28	+1:11.106	12	7
10	41	(Spain) Aleix Espargaró	Power Electronics Aspar	ART	28	+1:14.079	11	6
11	24	(Spain) Toni Elías	Pramac Racing Team	Ducati	28	+1:26.305	16	5
12	22	(Spain) Iván Silva	Avintia Blusens	BQR	28	+1:40.274	20	4
13	5	(United States) Colin Edwards	NGM Mobile Forward Racing	Suter	27	+1 lap	19	3
14	15	(United States) Steve Rapp	Attack Performance	APR	27	+1 lap	21	2
15	77	(United Kingdom) James Ellison	Paul Bird Motorsport	ART	27	+1 lap	17	1
16	20	(United States) Aaron Yates	GPTech	BCL	27	+1 lap	22	
Ret	35	(United Kingdom) Cal Crutchlow	Monster Yamaha Tech 3	Yamaha	9	Accident	7	
Ret	14	(France) Randy de Puniet	Power Electronics Aspar	ART	8	Retirement	9	
Ret	11	(United States) Ben Spies	Yamaha Factory Racing	Yamaha	6	Retirement	4	
Ret	51	(Italy) Michele Pirro	San Carlo Honda Gresini	FTR	1	Retirement	15	
Ret	54	(Italy) Mattia Pasini	Speed Master	ART	0	Accident	14	
Ret	9	(Italy) Danilo Petrucci	Came IodaRacing Project	Ioda	0	Retirement	18	
DNS	69	(United States) Nicky Hayden	Ducati Team	Ducati		Injury		
WD	8	(Spain) Héctor Barberá	Pramac Racing Team	Ducati		Injury		

=== Moto2 ===
Pos	No	Rider	Manufacturer	Laps	Time/Retired	Grid	Points
1	93	(Spain) Marc Márquez	Suter	26	45:13.763	2	25
2	40	(Spain) Pol Espargaró	Kalex	26	+5.855	1	20
3	60	(Spain) Julián Simón	Suter	26	+9.394	4	16
4	36	(Finland) Mika Kallio	Kalex	26	+15.549	8	13
5	12	(Switzerland) Thomas Lüthi	Suter	26	+16.138	9	11
6	45	(United Kingdom) Scott Redding	Kalex	26	+16.805	6	10
7	77	(Switzerland) Dominique Aegerter	Suter	26	+21.359	5	9
8	3	(Italy) Simone Corsi	FTR	26	+21.368	12	8
9	29	(Italy) Andrea Iannone	Speed Up	26	+25.873	3	7
10	71	(Italy) Claudio Corti	Kalex	26	+26.471	7	6
11	80	(Spain) Esteve Rabat	Kalex	26	+26.916	15	5
12	5	(France) Johann Zarco	Motobi	26	+27.274	13	4
13	18	(Spain) Nicolás Terol	Suter	26	+31.122	10	3
14	88	(Spain) Ricard Cardús	AJR	26	+35.928	17	2
15	38	(United Kingdom) Bradley Smith	Tech 3	26	+39.240	14	1
16	30	(Japan) Takaaki Nakagami	Kalex	26	+42.507	11	
17	4	(Switzerland) Randy Krummenacher	Kalex	26	+45.629	26	
18	81	(Spain) Jordi Torres	Suter	26	+45.753	23	
19	8	(United Kingdom) Gino Rea	Suter	26	+51.567	19	
20	76	(Germany) Max Neukirchner	Kalex	26	+52.106	28	
21	49	(Spain) Axel Pons	Kalex	26	+56.150	27	
22	23	(Germany) Marcel Schrötter	Bimota	26	+1:11.069	29	
23	14	(Thailand) Ratthapark Wilairot	Suter	26	+1:11.765	25	
24	63	(France) Mike Di Meglio	MZ-RE Honda	26	+1:20.042	20	
25	57	(Brazil) Eric Granado	Motobi	26	+1:42.924	31	
26	10	(Switzerland) Marco Colandrea	FTR	26	+1:43.184	32	
27	72	(Japan) Yuki Takahashi	FTR	23	+3 laps	21	
DSQ	95	(Australia) Anthony West	Speed Up	26	(+35.701)	24	
Ret	44	(Italy) Roberto Rolfo	Suter	20	Retirement	22	
Ret	19	(Belgium) Xavier Siméon	Tech 3	17	Accident	18	
Ret	15	(San Marino) Alex de Angelis	FTR	17	Accident	16	
Ret	22	(Italy) Alessandro Andreozzi	Speed Up	10	Accident	30	
Ret	82	(Spain) Elena Rosell	Moriwaki	7	Accident	33	

=== Moto3 ===
Pos	No	Rider	Manufacturer	Laps	Time/Retired	Grid	Points
1	39	(Spain) Luis Salom	Kalex KTM	23	42:14.300	4	25
2	11	(Germany) Sandro Cortese	KTM	23	+0.056	1	20
3	94	(Germany) Jonas Folger	Kalex KTM	23	+2.940	15	16
4	44	(Portugal) Miguel Oliveira	Suter Honda	23	+3.067	11	13
5	5	(Italy) Romano Fenati	FTR Honda	23	+3.664	8	11
6	63	(Malaysia) Zulfahmi Khairuddin	KTM	23	+7.663	5	10
7	42	(Spain) Álex Rins	Suter Honda	23	+7.697	6	9
8	84	(Czech Republic) Jakub Kornfeil	FTR Honda	23	+11.203	10	8
9	23	(Spain) Alberto Moncayo	FTR Honda	23	+11.242	9	7
10	10	(France) Alexis Masbou	Honda	23	+13.163	12	6
11	61	(Australia) Arthur Sissis	KTM	23	+23.362	22	5
12	52	(United Kingdom) Danny Kent	KTM	23	+24.364	2	4
13	96	(France) Louis Rossi	FTR Honda	23	+25.001	14	3
14	32	(Spain) Isaac Viñales	FTR Honda	23	+31.211	16	2
15	19	(Italy) Alessandro Tonucci	FTR Honda	23	+34.179	13	1
16	9	(Germany) Toni Finsterbusch	Honda	23	+1:12.945	27	
17	30	(Switzerland) Giulian Pedone	Suter Honda	23	+1:14.428	26	
18	51	(Japan) Kenta Fujii	TSR Honda	23	+1:14.709	29	
19	80	(Italy) Armando Pontone	Ioda	23	+1:15.326	28	
20	20	(Italy) Riccardo Moretti	Mahindra	22	+1 lap	30	
Ret	25	(Spain) Maverick Viñales	FTR Honda	22	Accident	3	
Ret	89	(France) Alan Techer	TSR Honda	15	Accident	18	
Ret	7	(Spain) Efrén Vázquez	FTR Honda	11	Accident	7	
Ret	3	(Italy) Luigi Morciano	Ioda	10	Retirement	25	
Ret	12	(Spain) Álex Márquez	Suter Honda	6	Accident	19	
Ret	41	(South Africa) Brad Binder	Kalex KTM	3	Accident	17	
Ret	26	(Spain) Adrián Martín	FTR Honda	0	Accident	20	
Ret	53	(Netherlands) Jasper Iwema	FGR Honda	0	Accident	21	
Ret	27	(Italy) Niccolò Antonelli	FTR Honda	0	Accident	24	
DSQ	31	(Finland) Niklas Ajo	KTM	4	Disqualified	23	
DNS	8	(Australia) Jack Miller	Honda		Injury		
DNS	99	(United Kingdom) Danny Webb	Mahindra		Injury		
DNS	55	(Spain) Héctor Faubel	Kalex KTM		Injury		

== Championship standings after the race (MotoGP) ==
Below are the standings for the top five riders and constructors after round eleven has concluded.

Riders' Championship standings

Pos.	Rider	Points
1	(Spain) Jorge Lorenzo	225
2	(Spain) Dani Pedrosa	207
3	(Australia) Casey Stoner	186
4	(Italy) Andrea Dovizioso	137
5	(United Kingdom) Cal Crutchlow	106

Constructors' Championship standings

Pos.	Constructor	Points
1	(Japan) Honda	246
2	(Japan) Yamaha	241
3	(Italy) Ducati	115
4	(Italy) ART	54
5	(Spain) BQR	20

- Note: Only the top five positions are included for both sets of standings.

Previous race: 2012 United States Grand Prix	FIM Grand Prix World Championship; 2012 season	Next race: 2012 Czech Republic Grand Prix
Previous race: 2011 Indianapolis Grand Prix	Indianapolis motorcycle Grand Prix	Next race: 2013 Indianapolis Grand Prix
