= 2015 Valencian Community motorcycle Grand Prix =

2015 Valencian Community Grand Prix
Race details
- Race 18 of 18 races in the 2015 Grand Prix motorcycle racing season
- Date: 8 November 2015
- Official name: Gran Premio Motul de la Comunitat Valenciana
- Location: Circuit Ricardo Tormo
- Course: Permanent racing facility; 4.005 km (2.489 mi)

MotoGP
Pole position
Rider	(Spain) Jorge Lorenzo	Yamaha
Time	1:30.011	
Fastest lap
Rider	(Spain) Jorge Lorenzo	Yamaha
Time	1:31.367 on lap 3	
Podium
First	(Spain) Jorge Lorenzo	Yamaha
Second	(Spain) Marc Márquez	Honda
Third	(Spain) Dani Pedrosa	Honda

Moto2
Pole position
Rider	(Spain) Tito Rabat	Kalex
Time	1:35.234	
Fastest lap
Rider	(Spain) Tito Rabat	Kalex
Time	1:35.416 on lap 15	
Podium
First	(Spain) Tito Rabat	Kalex
Second	(Spain) Álex Rins	Kalex
Third	(Switzerland) Thomas Lüthi	Kalex

Moto3
Pole position
Rider	(United Kingdom) John McPhee	Honda
Time	1:39.364	
Fastest lap
Rider	(Italy) Romano Fenati	KTM
Time	1:39.622 on lap 16	
Podium
First	(Portugal) Miguel Oliveira	KTM
Second	(Spain) Jorge Navarro	Honda
Third	(Czech Republic) Jakub Kornfeil	KTM

The 2015 Valencian Community motorcycle Grand Prix was the eighteenth and final round of the 2015 Grand Prix motorcycle racing season. It was held at the Circuit Ricardo Tormo in Valencia on 8 November 2015.

== Background ==
This was the last race for Bridgestone, who had been the sole tyre supplier since 2009, as the sole tyre supplier in MotoGP, before they are replaced by Michelin for 2016. It was also the last race for the ART and Forward Yamaha bikes. After a court trial involving Valentino Rossi's clash with Marc Márquez in the previous race, the FIM staff and CAS rejected Rossi's appeal of suspension of three penalty points given for purposely pushing Márquez wide, and declared that he would start the round from last place.

== Race ==
Championship hopeful Jorge Lorenzo had taken pole position and took the start, and led from start to finish, closely shadowed by Honda duo Márquez and Dani Pedrosa, Rossi fought up to fourth after being allowed to pass by numerous other riders, but had no prospect of catching any of the three top riders and so cruised home. Lorenzo was subject to heavy pressure by the Honda riders during the final lap, but held on to claim his third MotoGP and fifth overall title.

== Classification ==
=== MotoGP ===
Pos.	No.	Rider	Team	Manufacturer	Laps	Time/Retired	Grid	Points
1	99	(Spain) Jorge Lorenzo	Movistar Yamaha MotoGP	Yamaha	30	45:59.364	1	25
2	93	(Spain) Marc Márquez	Repsol Honda Team	Honda	30	+0.263	2	20
3	26	(Spain) Dani Pedrosa	Repsol Honda Team	Honda	30	+0.654	3	16
4	46	(Italy) Valentino Rossi	Movistar Yamaha MotoGP	Yamaha	30	+19.789	26	13
5	44	(Spain) Pol Espargaró	Monster Yamaha Tech 3	Yamaha	30	+26.004	8	11
6	38	(United Kingdom) Bradley Smith	Monster Yamaha Tech 3	Yamaha	30	+28.835	6	10
7	4	(Italy) Andrea Dovizioso	Ducati Team	Ducati	30	+28.886	9	9
8	41	(Spain) Aleix Espargaró	Team Suzuki Ecstar	Suzuki	30	+34.222	4	8
9	35	(United Kingdom) Cal Crutchlow	LCR Honda	Honda	30	+35.924	5	7
10	9	(Italy) Danilo Petrucci	Octo Pramac Racing	Ducati	30	+39.579	10	6
11	25	(Spain) Maverick Viñales	Team Suzuki Ecstar	Suzuki	30	+39.746	11	5
12	51	(Italy) Michele Pirro	Ducati Team	Ducati	30	+47.053	12	4
13	68	(Colombia) Yonny Hernández	Octo Pramac Racing	Ducati	30	+54.081	17	3
14	19	(Spain) Álvaro Bautista	Aprilia Racing Team Gresini	Aprilia	30	+56.646	18	2
15	45	(United Kingdom) Scott Redding	EG 0,0 Marc VDS	Honda	30	+57.278	19	1
16	8	(Spain) Héctor Barberá	Avintia Racing	Ducati	30	+57.363	14	
17	69	(United States) Nicky Hayden	Aspar MotoGP Team	Honda	30	+58.742	16	
18	6	(Germany) Stefan Bradl	Aprilia Racing Team Gresini	Aprilia	30	+59.086	13	
19	76	(France) Loris Baz	Forward Racing	Yamaha Forward	30	+1:04.339	15	
20	24	(Spain) Toni Elías	Forward Racing	Yamaha Forward	30	+1:04.413	24	
21	43	(Australia) Jack Miller	LCR Honda	Honda	30	+1:05.212	20	
22	13	(Australia) Anthony West	AB Motoracing	Honda	30	+1:27.281	22	
Ret	63	(France) Mike Di Meglio	Avintia Racing	Ducati	24	Retirement	21	
Ret	50	(Republic of Ireland) Eugene Laverty	Aspar MotoGP Team	Honda	23	Retirement	23	
Ret	23	(Australia) Broc Parkes	E-Motion IodaRacing Team	ART	21	Retirement	25	
Ret	29	(Italy) Andrea Iannone	Ducati Team	Ducati	2	Accident	7	

=== Moto2 ===
Dominique Aegerter was replaced by Joshua Hook after the second practice session.

The first attempt to run the race was interrupted following an accident involving multiple riders in the opening lap. For the restart, the race distance was reduced from 27 to 18 laps.

Pos.	No.	Rider	Manufacturer	Laps	Time/Retired	Grid	Points
1	1	(Spain) Tito Rabat	Kalex	18	28:48.831	1	25
2	40	(Spain) Álex Rins	Kalex	18	+0.309	3	20
3	12	(Switzerland) Thomas Lüthi	Kalex	18	+3.347	4	16
4	7	(Italy) Lorenzo Baldassarri	Kalex	18	+3.644	5	13
5	22	(United Kingdom) Sam Lowes	Speed Up	18	+5.140	10	11
6	39	(Spain) Luis Salom	Kalex	18	+9.499	12	10
7	5	(France) Johann Zarco	Kalex	18	+9.834	2	9
8	49	(Spain) Axel Pons	Kalex	18	+11.197	7	8
9	3	(Italy) Simone Corsi	Kalex	18	+11.611	9	7
10	36	(Finland) Mika Kallio	Speed Up	18	+17.311	15	6
11	30	(Japan) Takaaki Nakagami	Kalex	18	+20.784	8	5
12	73	(Spain) Álex Márquez	Kalex	18	+21.296	14	4
13	11	(Germany) Sandro Cortese	Kalex	18	+21.455	13	3
14	94	(Germany) Jonas Folger	Kalex	18	+21.560	18	2
15	23	(Germany) Marcel Schrötter	Tech 3	18	+24.669	21	1
16	19	(Belgium) Xavier Siméon	Kalex	18	+28.190	23	
17	97	(Spain) Xavi Vierge	Tech 3	18	+28.537	22	
18	60	(Spain) Julián Simón	Speed Up	18	+28.762	6	
19	88	(Spain) Ricard Cardús	Suter	18	+29.017	17	
20	66	(Germany) Florian Alt	Suter	18	+29.297	19	
21	4	(Switzerland) Randy Krummenacher	Kalex	18	+30.788	20	
22	70	(Switzerland) Robin Mulhauser	Kalex	18	+32.028	26	
23	10	(Thailand) Thitipong Warokorn	Kalex	18	+37.044	28	
24	2	(Switzerland) Jesko Raffin	Kalex	18	+37.107	27	
25	32	(Italy) Federico Fuligni	Suter	18	+47.239	29	
26	16	(Australia) Joshua Hook	Kalex	18	+47.901	30	
Ret	90	(France) Lucas Mahias	TransFIORmers	13	Retirement	16	
Ret	57	(Spain) Edgar Pons	Kalex	3	Accident	25	
DNS	21	(Italy) Franco Morbidelli	Kalex	0	Did not restart	11	
DNS	55	(Malaysia) Hafizh Syahrin	Kalex	0	Did not restart	24	
DNS	25	(Malaysia) Azlan Shah	Kalex		Did not start		
DNS	96	(France) Louis Rossi	Tech 3		Did not start		
OFFICIAL MOTO2 REPORT

=== Moto3 ===
Pos.	No.	Rider	Manufacturer	Laps	Time/Retired	Grid	Points
1	44	(Portugal) Miguel Oliveira	KTM	24	40:09.792	4	25
2	9	(Spain) Jorge Navarro	Honda	24	+0.198	5	20
3	84	(Czech Republic) Jakub Kornfeil	KTM	24	+2.090	12	16
4	41	(South Africa) Brad Binder	KTM	24	+2.121	9	13
5	33	(Italy) Enea Bastianini	Honda	24	+2.975	6	11
6	32	(Spain) Isaac Viñales	KTM	24	+3.343	13	10
7	17	(United Kingdom) John McPhee	Honda	24	+4.087	1	9
8	76	(Japan) Hiroki Ono	Honda	24	+9.627	10	8
9	52	(United Kingdom) Danny Kent	Honda	24	+9.914	18	7
10	65	(Germany) Philipp Öttl	KTM	24	+10.580	14	6
11	16	(Italy) Andrea Migno	KTM	24	+10.661	15	5
12	8	(Italy) Nicolò Bulega	KTM	24	+11.642	16	4
13	21	(Italy) Francesco Bagnaia	Mahindra	24	+16.741	19	3
14	88	(Spain) Jorge Martín	Mahindra	24	+20.196	24	2
15	10	(France) Alexis Masbou	Honda	24	+21.531	20	1
16	95	(France) Jules Danilo	Honda	24	+21.552	17	
17	63	(Malaysia) Zulfahmi Khairuddin	KTM	24	+21.868	21	
18	40	(South Africa) Darryn Binder	Mahindra	24	+25.114	26	
19	29	(Italy) Stefano Manzi	Mahindra	24	+25.301	29	
20	11	(Belgium) Livio Loi	Honda	24	+25.331	28	
21	6	(Spain) María Herrera	Husqvarna	24	+25.655	22	
22	48	(Italy) Lorenzo Dalla Porta	Husqvarna	24	+32.973	23	
23	4	(Italy) Fabio Di Giannantonio	Honda	24	+33.019	25	
24	22	(Spain) Ana Carrasco	KTM	24	+33.549	31	
25	96	(Italy) Manuel Pagliani	Mahindra	24	+33.953	27	
Ret	7	(Spain) Efrén Vázquez	Honda	23	Accident	3	
Ret	5	(Italy) Romano Fenati	KTM	23	Accident	2	
Ret	23	(Italy) Niccolò Antonelli	Honda	23	Accident	7	
Ret	19	(Italy) Alessandro Tonucci	Mahindra	20	Retirement	33	
Ret	98	(Czech Republic) Karel Hanika	KTM	10	Accident	8	
Ret	20	(France) Fabio Quartararo	Honda	10	Retirement	11	
Ret	58	(Spain) Juan Francisco Guevara	Mahindra	7	Retirement	30	
Ret	24	(Japan) Tatsuki Suzuki	Mahindra	7	Retirement	34	
Ret	2	(Australia) Remy Gardner	Mahindra	5	Retirement	32	
DNS	91	(Argentina) Gabriel Rodrigo	KTM		Did not start		
OFFICIAL MOTO3 REPORT

== Championship standings after the race (MotoGP) ==
Below are the standings for the top five riders and constructors after round eighteen has concluded.

Riders' Championship standings

Pos.	Rider	Points
1	(Spain) Jorge Lorenzo	330
2	(Italy) Valentino Rossi	325
3	(Spain) Marc Márquez	242
4	(Spain) Dani Pedrosa	206
5	(Italy) Andrea Iannone	188

Constructors' Championship standings

Pos.	Constructor	Points
1	(Japan) Yamaha	407
2	(Japan) Honda	355
3	(Italy) Ducati	256
4	(Japan) Suzuki	137
5	(Italy) Aprilia	36

- Note: Only the top five positions are included for both sets of standings.

Previous race: 2015 Malaysian Grand Prix	FIM Grand Prix World Championship; 2015 season	Next race: 2016 Qatar Grand Prix
Previous race: 2014 Valencian Grand Prix	Valencian Community motorcycle Grand Prix	Next race: 2016 Valencian Grand Prix
