= Automotive industry in Argentina =

The automotive industry in Argentina is the third largest in Latin America, driving 3% of Argentina’s GDP, 9% of industrial production, and 11% of exports in 2024. With a dozen global multinationals and over 200 auto parts companies operating in the country, Argentina's automotive sector is a sophisticated and technologically advanced industry. Automakers rely on Argentina as a regional production hub for Latin America and in 2024 exported over US$9 billion in passenger vehicles, light and heavy commercial vehicles, trucks, motorcycles, and parts primarily to Brazil, Chile, Colombia, Peru, and Central America. Given the popularity of light-duty trucks among Argentine consumers, Argentina is the world's fourth largest producer of pickup trucks; top pickup brands produced in Argentina include the Toyota Hilux, Ford Ranger, Nissan Frontier, and Volkswagen Amarok.

Argentine capital returned to the automotive sector in scale in 2025 when Prestige Auto, backed by local entrepreneur Pablo Peralta, acquired the local brand operations of Mercedes-Benz Argentina, including a plant at Virrey del Pino, La Matanza Partido in Buenos Aires province focused on Sprinter van production as well as a commercial organization that markets and services high-end vehicles imported from Germany. Local capital also participates within niches such as motorcycle assembly (e.g., Grupo Simpa, Grupo La Emilia, Grupo Corven), small-scale electric vehicle assembly (e.g., Coradir, Sero Motors, VOLT Motors) and specialty producers (e.g., Helvetica and Crespi.

Motor vehicle and auto parts manufacturers are major employers in a country that has struggled to create registered private sector employment. In 2024, over 27,000 Argentines were employed by motor vehicle manufacturers, with an additional 43,000 employed by auto parts companies and 4,000 employed by motorcycle manufacturers.

Three major industrial associations represent Argentine automotive manufacturers. The Asociación de Fábricas de Automotores (ADEFA) was founded in 1961 to represent motor vehicle manufacturers and is a member of the International Automobile Manufacturers Association (OICA) based in Paris. Auto parts manufacturers are represented by the Asociación de Fábricas Argentinas de Componentes (AFAC), which was founded in 1939. Motorcycle manufacturers and importers are represented by the Cámara de Fabricantes de Motovehículos de la Argentina, formed in 2013 when three separate industry sub-organizations merged into a single entity.

== History ==
=== Early industry ===
Motor vehicle assembly in Argentina started in the early twentieth century when local entrepreneur Horacio Anasagasti operated a workshop from 1906 to 1911 that produced custom vehicles using imported European parts. A commercial scale industry was launched in 1913 with the opening of a Ford plant in the Barracas neighborhood of Buenos Aires that assembled imported knock down kits. By 1920, Ford's Argentine operations had grown to 1,500 employees due to rising demand for cars in South America. General Motors followed with an assembly operation in 1925. By 1930, Argentina ranked as the second largest foreign market after Canada for the U.S. automotive industry. Argentina's car ownership rate in 1930 (one vehicle per 27.6 inhabitants) was higher than in France (one vehicle per 27.1 inhabitants), the United Kingdom (one vehicle per 29.5 inhabitants) and Denmark (one vehicle per 31.0 inhabitants).

The auto parts industry emerged during the 1930s. Tire production was dominated by foreign brands such as Goodyear, Pirelli, Firestone, and Michelin. Aftermarket replacement parts were typically produced by small workshops that became the basis of a locally owned supplier industry.

Until the mid-1950s, virtually all motor vehicles in Argentina were imported either as fully assembled vehicles or knock-down kits, which made consumption vulnerable to disruption. From 1925 to 1929, Argentina imported an average of 60,000 motor vehicles per year, which fell to under 10,000 annually in 1932-33 due to the Great Depression and under 500 annually from 1943 to 1945 due to World War II. Under the Perón regime, imports briefly surged to 80,000 units in 1947 but were restricted to an average of only 9,000 units annually from 1949 to 1955 due to recurring balance of payments crises. Strict import quotas and restrictions on profit repatriation caused Ford to cease its assembly operations in January 1948.

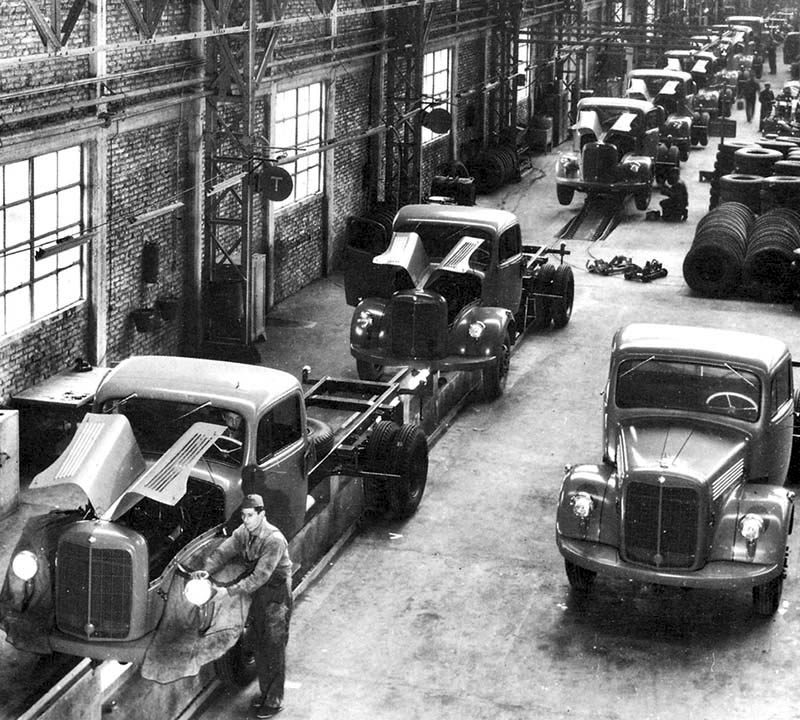
Assembly at the Mercedes-Benz factory

Domestic production started in 1952 when Mercedes-Benz's commercial trucks division opened a chassis manufacturing facility at González Catán in Buenos Aires Province that was the company's first integrated production plant outside of Germany. A large-scale passenger vehicle industry was established in 1955 when the Perón regime and American businessman Henry J. Kaiser formed a joint venture between state-owned Industrias Aeronáuticas y Mecánicas del Estado (IAME) and Kaiser-Frazer Automobile Co. Known as Industrias Kaiser Argentina (IKA), the joint venture was capitalized by a contribution of second-hand equipment by Kaiser, a cash investment by IAME, and a local share offering. The first Argentine manufactured Jeep rolled off the assembly line at IKA's plant at Córdoba in April 1956.

=== Building a modern industry ===
Even with the establishment of IKA as a national champion, fewer than 30,000 vehicles were produced in 1958. Under the Frondizi administration's policy of desarrollismo (developmentalism), the motor vehicle sector was promoted along with steel, chemicals, machinery, and equipment for investment and growth. Decree 3693/59 was enacted in 1959 to stimulate increased automotive production; commonly known as the Regime for the Promotion of the Automotive Industry, the decree virtually prohibited imports of fully assembled vehicles while providing incentives such as duty-free import of machinery and equipment for automakers willing to invest in domestic production and comply with progressive increases in local content requirements.

During 1959, the Fronidizi government approved applications by over 20 foreign and domestic companies to build automobile and truck assembly facilities. Between 1959 and 1964, over 20% of total private foreign investment in Argentina was directed to the automotive sector. Production volume increased by over 30% per year, rising from 33,000 units in 1959 to 195,000 units in 1965, making Argentina the second-largest motor vehicle manufacturer in the developing world after Spain.

Automotive Production in Developing Countries (1965)
Country	Total	Cars	Truck & Buses
Spain	212,500	142,300	70,200
Argentina	196,800	131,800	65,000
Brazil	180,800	101,500	79,300
South Africa	176,200	129,000	47,200
Mexico	126,700	88,700	38,000
India	69,500	23,100	46,400
Venezuela	53,500	37,700	15,800
Portugal	37,000	30,000	7,000
All other developing countries*	118,400	69,700	48,700
Total	1,171,400	753,800	417,600

* Includes Malaysia, Thailand, Pakistan, Taiwan, Burma (Myanmar), South Korea, Peru, Colombia, Costa Rica, United Arab Republic (Egypt and Syria), Iran, Algeria, Morocco, Turkey, Nigeria, Ivory Coast (Côte d'Ivoire), and Malagasy (Madagascar). Excludes Communist countries.

However, the large number of market entrants resulted in inefficient, subscale production. An American manufacturer estimated in 1967 that ex-factory cost for motor vehicles produced in Argentina were approximately 2.5 times for the equivalent model in the United States, compared to a ratio of 1.7 in Brazil and 1.6 in Mexico. A key reason for Argentina's high production costs were severe diseconomies of scale—not only was production per company significantly lower in Argentina compared to developed economies, but capacity utilization was low, ranging from 70 to 80% at the peak of the economic cycle to only 20-60%. Furthermore, a proliferation of models resulted in short production runs and considerable downtime for equipment changes. In addition, most automakers used outdated manual equipment to minimize their financial commitment in a low volume, high risk market; in fact, during the early 1960s, the majority of foreign direct investment in the sector was in the form of second-hand machinery and equipment instead of cash.

Vehicle Production Volumes for Selected European and Developing Countries (1965)
Country	Number of Firms Accounting for 80-90% of Production	Average Units per Firm
Italy	1	988,000
West Germany	4	649,000
United Kingdom	4	498,000
France	4	383,000
Japan	8	211,000
Spain	3	60,000
Brazil	3	54,000
Argentina	6	28,000

Given the intense degree of competition in the Argentine market, the industry consolidated under the control of global multinationals in the mid to late 1960s. Domestically owned automakers emerged from the 1962-63 recession in a precarious financial condition and were unable to compete in a market where prices were declining in inflation-adjusted terms and manufacturers were easing credit terms to dealers and consumers. In 1965, Chrysler acquired Industria Automotriz Santa Fe (IASF), which assembled DKW vehicles under license. Peugeot acquired its Argentine licensee Industriales Argentinos Fabricantes de Automotores (IAFA) in 1966. In 1967, Renault acquired national champion IKA, which itself had merged with the automotive division of local manufacturing conglomerate Siam di Tella two years earlier.

[There will be paragraph on auto parts suppliers, which suffered from scale and quality issues.]

The import substitution industrialization model paradoxically worsened Argentina's balance of payments problems. Imports of parts and components under Decree 3693/59 reached US$130 million in 1961, prompting the passage of Decree 6567/61 with new restrictions on imported content. Yet even as domestic content exceeded 90% by value in the mid-1960s, significant cash outflows persisted as subsidiaries of foreign multinationals used profit repatriation, royalty payments, transfer pricing, and interest payments on intercompany loans to return capital to their parent companies. The Central Bank of Argentina in 1965 estimated that the motor vehicle industry imposed a foreign exchange burden of US$250 million per year.

Starting in the mid-1960s, the Argentine government actively promoted automotive exports, particularly within the Asociación Latinoamericana de Libre Comercio (Latin America Free Trade Association or LAFTA) trade zone. Argentina negotiated managed trade agreements with other LAFTA members enabling duty-free exports of finished vehicles in exchange for imports of auto parts. Argentine motor vehicle exports increased from under 2,000 units in 1971 to 15,500 in 1974, an increase that was considered at the time to be a rapid and successful entry into the global automotive market.

=== Operating in a conflict society ===
[This section will discuss how automakers were drawn into societal conflicts such as the Cordobazo, kidnappings of foreign executives, and collaboration with the 1976-83 military dictatorship.]

The automotive industry featured prominently in the far-reaching social and political conflicts of the 1960s and 1970s. Due in part to a decentralized structure that empowered rank-and-file members, the autoworkers' union Sindicato de Mecánicos y Afines del Transporte Automotor (SMATA) was among the most militant in the country. Autoworkers engaged in labor conflicts such as the "Plan de Lucha" of 1964 whereby 3.9 million workers protested the proscription of Peronism under the civilian administration of President Illia (1963–66) by occupying over 11,000 factories, including the Ford plant at General Pacheco. Most famously, SMATA members in Córdoba initiated and led the Cordobazo protests in 1969 that engulfed the country and resulted in the downfall of dictator Juan Carlos Onganía; however, the military regime itself survived until 1973.

Given its association with foreign capital, the automotive industry was targeted by urban guerilla movements that emerged in the early 1970s, particularly the Ejército Revolucionario del Pueblo (ERP). The ERP was responsible for the high-profile abduction and execution of Oberdan Sallustro, Director General of Fiat's Argentine subsidiary, in 1972.

Ford and Mercedes-Benz are accused of collaborating with the military dictatorship through abductions of union leaders and supplying vehicles to military death squads.

In 2018, two former Ford Argentina executives were convicted of participating in human rights violations during the Dirty War.

=== Surviving the economic downturn ===
[This section will cover 1975-1990, including trade liberalization under the military administration in the 1970s and the first bilateral agreements between Brazil and Argentina in the 1980s.]

Several automakers left the country during this period. General Motors ceased operations in 1978, liquidating its Argentine subsidiary and laying off 4,000 employees. Citroën and Chrysler both departed in 1979. Volkswagen acquired Chrysler Fevre.

Domestic manufacturers became more active in the industry during this period, acquiring local subsidiaries and/or securing production licenses. Industrias Eduardo Sal-Lari (IES) was established by an Argentine engineer of the same name was granted a license in 1983 to assemble Citroën's 3CV car.

Entrepreneur Franco Macri, father of former President Mauricio Macri, acquired a controlling stake in Sevel in 1982 and produced Fiat, Peugeot, and Chevrolet models under license.

=== Renewed expansion and regional integration ===
Strong economic growth and the end of hyperinflation under the Convertibility Plan led to renewed expansion in Argentina's automotive industry during the early 1990s. Although Argentina has faced recurring economic crises over the past 30 years, the automotive sector has experienced growth, investment, and record levels of production and exports during this period.

Production bottomed out in 1990 at 99,600 units, the lowest level since 1960. Only three years later, production hit a new record of 342,000 units, exceeding the prior peak in 1973 by over 15%, and then soared to 408,000 units in 1994. Production dropped by 30% during the 1995 Tequila crisis but swiftly rebounded to new records again in 1997 and 1998 with approximately 450,000 units annually during both years. Global multinationals returned to participate in the phenomenal growth of the Argentine automotive industry. General Motors returned in 1993 by entering a joint venture with Cidea and investing US$100 million to restart production. Chrysler returned with a new assembly plant in 1997 and Toyota opened its Zárate plant the same year.

Integration between the automotive industries of Argentina and Brazil has deepened since the 1990s through gradual liberalization and managed trade agreements. An industry expert observed that the Argentine and Brazilian automotive sectors are "actually a single industry spread across two countries."

== Multinational Automakers in Argentina ==
Local subsidiaries of American, European, and Asian multinationals have dominated Argentina's automotive industry since the 1990s. In 2024, the top four multinationals operating in Argentina (Toyota, Stellantis, Volkswagen, and Ford) produced over 60% of the approximately 500,000 motor vehicles assembled in the country that year. Despite the recent economic downturn, multinationals have announced almost US$2 billion in new capital investment since early 2024 to support national production in Argentina, particularly as a South American assembly hub for pickup trucks.

=== Passenger vehicle production ===
Toyota Argentina S.A. is the industry leader, having ranked as Argentina’s top motor vehicle producer since 2016. Toyota is also Argentina’s largest industrial exporter, driving not only 51% of the country’s motor vehicle exports but also 5% of all Argentine exports in the first half of 2025.

Local production started in 1997 at Zárate in Buenos Aires province with 800 employees and annual production of 10,000 units, half of which were exported to Brazil. Today, the Zárate plant has 6,000 employees and assembled over 170,000 units of the Hilux pickup truck and SW4 SUV in 2024. Eighty percent of Toyota's local production is exported to 22 countries in Latin America and the Caribbean. In February 2024, Toyota announced a US$50 million investment to start local assembly of the Hiace van using imported kits from Japan. Hiace exports from Zárate to Brazil started in September 2025.

Stellantis Argentina S.A. assembled over 140,000 vehicles in 2024, primarily of Fiat Cronos and Peugeot 208 subcompact cars. The company’s history in Argentina dates back to 1954 when predecessor Fiat Automobiles S.p.A. started producing tractors in the country. Stellantis today operates assembly plants at El Palomar in Buenos Aires province and Ferreyra in Córdoba province. In September 2025, the El Palomar facility reached a historical milestone by producing over 3,000,000 vehicles encompassing over 80 different models and versions across the Peugeot, Citroën, and Fiat brands.

The Stellantis Group has committed over US$600 million of its global investment planning cycle to its operations in Argentina with a US$270 million investment at El Palomar announced in April 2024 and a further US$385 million at Ferreyra in September 2024. The Ferreyra investment was notable in supporting the facility’s role as a South American assembly hub for pickup trucks, starting with production of the mid-sized Fiat Titano in May 2025, and production of a locally developed 2.2 litre MultiJet turbodiesel I4 engine for use across multiple Stellantis vehicles; altogether the new production capabilities at Ferreyra are expected to generate 1,800 new jobs.

The El Palomar investment launched hybrid car production for the first time by any multinational brand in Argentina. In September 2025, Stellantis initiated assembly of Peugeot 208 and 2008 hybrids for export to Brazil using the MildHybrid biofuels technology developed specifically for the Brazilian market.

Stellantis has also made strategic investments in Argentina to support its global net zero goals, including US$155 million for a 14.2% stake in a sustainable copper mine project at Los Azules in February 2023, US$90 million for a 19.9% stake in lithium producer Argentina Litio y Energia in September 2023, and US$100 million for a 49.5% stake in 360 Energy Solar (one of Argentina's leading solar power producers) in April 2024.

Volkswagen Argentina has the third-largest local assembly operation with 4,250 employees and production facilities at Córdoba and at General Pacheco in Buenos Aires province. The Córdoba plant produces gearboxes, Ducati motorcycles, and VW commercial trucks and buses, while the Pacheco facility assembled 63,000 units of the VW Taos SUV and VW Amarok pickup truck in 2024.

VW commercial truck and bus production launched at Córdoba in 2024 to replace units previously imported from Brazil. In April 2025, Volkswagen announced a US$580 million investment to produce an updated Amarok model at Pacheco in partnership with Chinese automaker SAIC-Maxus designed specifically for the South American market. As part of the Pacheco investment, Taos SUV assembly moved to Mexico; however, Volkswagen announced its intention to deepen the level of integration with local parts suppliers compared to historical levels.

Ford Motor Argentina is the oldest operating automaker in the country with a history dating back over a century. The company's Pacheco Stamping and Assembly facility at General Pacheco in Buenos Aires province has been Ford's sole plant in South America since 2021, when the company ceased manufacturing operations in Brazil. The Pacheco plant has 3,800 employees and is solely dedicated to the Ford Ranger pickup truck; over 60,000 units were assembled in 2024. In June 2024, Ford started exporting Ford Ranger engines from Pacheco as well.

Seventy percent of Ranger production is exported to markets including Brazil, Chile, Peru, Colombia, Ecuador, Venezuela, and Uruguay. With production planned to expand to 70,000 units in 2025, Ford Argentina recently created 160 new direct jobs at Pacheco.

In August 2025, the Pacheco facility reached a historical milestone with over 3,500,000 units assembled since its opening in 1961, including storied local models such as the Falcon, F-100, Fairlane, Taunus, and Sierra.

To support integration of local parts, Ford Argentina started domestic production of the Panther 2.0 mono-turbodiesel engine (170 hp and 405 Nm) at Pacheco. In addition, in December 2024, Ford Argentina opened a new 7,400 square metre corporate headquarters close to Pacheco.

Renault-Nissan-Mitsubishi (RNM) Alliance has operated in Argentina since 1967 when Renault acquired a controlling stake in IKA, which had previously assembled Renault vehicles under a licensing agreement. RNM's facility at Santa Isabel in Córdoba province has 1,980 employees and produces 80,000 units of Renault passenger vehicles (Kangoo 2, Sandero 2, Logan 2, and Alaskan) and 20,000 units of the Nissan Frontier pickup truck annually. Fifty percent of Nissan Frontier production is exported to other Latin American countries, including Brazil, Chile, and Colombia.

In September 2024, Renault announced a US$350 million investment and 850 new jobs at its Santa Isabel facility to assemble a new half-ton pickup truck; 65-70% of production will be exported. However, in March 2025, Nissan announced the closure of its assembly operations by January 2026 as part of a global restructuring that consolidated production for Latin American markets at its plants in Mexico.

General Motors de Argentina also dates back to the 1920s although the company ceased operations in the country from 1978 to 1994. The company's current plant at Alvear in Santa Fe province opened in 1997 and is solely dedicated to the Chevy Tracker subcompact crossover vehicle. Approximately 24,000 Tracker units were assembled at Alvear in 2024; 80% of production is exported to other South American countries. GM discontinued assembly of the Chevy Cruze compact car at the end of 2023; however, the company continues to produce Chevy Cruze parts and powertrains for export. In June 2025, GM confirmed that retooling was underway at Alvear to support assembly of the next Tracker model; however, acknowledging weak demand in regional export markets, GM extended its shutdown of the Alvear facility with planned closures of one week per month through December 2025.

=== Heavy vehicle production ===
Argentina's truck and bus assembly industry is dominated by local subsidiaries of Daimler Truck, Scania AB, and Iveco. Industry economists expect production of 19,000 units in 2025, driven by end market growth in energy and agriculture in a country where over 90% of goods are transported by truck.

Daimler Truck, a commercial vehicle manufacturer spun off from Mercedes-Benz Group in 2021, operates a plant at Virrey del Pino, La Matanza Partido that produces Atego and Accelo light trucks as well as engines and gearboxes. In 2024, the company announced plans to build a new US$110 million production facility at Zárate that would open in Q1 2026.

Scania AB operates the only automotive assembly facility in Argentina outside of the Littoral region. The company's plant at Colombres in Tucumán province, which opened in 1976, focuses on truck and bus parts and has 600 employees and 200 contractors. The facility exports 100% of its production, primarily to Brazil.

Iveco, whose acquisition by Tata Motors was announced in August 2025, has operated a commercial vehicle plant at Ferreyra since 1969. In November 2024, Iveco enabled Argentina to achieve a key milestone in urban sustainable mobility solutions by delivering the first domestically produced buses powered by compressed natural gas. Iveco affiliate FPT Industrial operates an engine and powertrain manufacturing facility at Córdoba that opened in 2012. The facility exports 60% of its annual production to markets such as Brazil and Mexico and achieved a milestone in March 2024 by producing engine number 200,000. In August 2025, FPT announced an EUR 20 million investment between 2026 and 2030 in its Córdoba facility.

=== Motorcycle production ===
Honda Motor de Argentina S.A. is the most recent entrant in the country, having launched motorcycle production in 2006 and motor vehicle assembly in 2009. The company's plant at Campana in Buenos Aires province now focuses solely on motorcycles after Honda ceased local automobile assembly in 2020. The facility has 1,240 employees and produces 150,000 motorcycles annually both for the domestic market and for export throughout Latin America and Africa. In August 2024, Honda announced a US$15 million investment at its Campana plant to export parts to Brazil. In April 2025, Honda announced that the Campana plant had reached a new milestone by assembling a total of 1.5 million motorcycles.

== Participation by Argentine capital ==
=== Sale of Mercedes-Benz Argentina to Prestige Auto ===
Argentine capital, which participated as local commercial partners or via niche segments, returned in scale to the sector in February 2025 when Prestige Auto, backed by local entrepreneur Pablo Peralta and former Toyota Argentina S.A. CEO Daniel Herrero, acquired the local operations of Mercedes-Benz Argentina. Under the transaction terms, Prestige Auto acquired the local Mercedes-Benz brand, including a plant at Virrey del Pino, La Matanza Partido in Buenos Aires province focused on Sprinter van production as well as a commercial organization that markets and services high-end vehicles imported from Germany. The Virrey del Pino plant, which has 1,800 employees, is expected to produce 16,000 Sprinter units in 2025, 60% of which are exported. In August 2025, Prestige announced its willingness to invest US$400 million starting in 2027 to build an electrified Sprinter at the Virrey del Pino plant.

=== Motorcycle production ===
The motorcycle industry is extensively served by Argentine capital via both imported finished goods and domestically assembled imported kits. Local assembly typically uses the IKD ("Incomplete Knock-Down") regime introduced in June 2023 that requires integration of domestically-produced parts. Key locally-owned motorcycle players include:

Grupo Simpa: Led by the Schwartz family, Grupo Simpa is a top player in the high-end motorcycle market with brands including KTM, Husqvarna, Gas Gas, Royal Enfield, Piaggio, Moto Guzzi, Vespa, Aprilia, CFMoto, Cam-Am, Segway and Super Soco. In September 2025, Grupo Simpa closed its assembly facility in Campana that had focused on assembly of KTM products. However, the company continues to operate an assembly facility at Pilar focused on Royal Enfield and Aprilia motorcycles.

Grupo La Emilia: The company's nationally designed and produced Motomel brand is the best-selling domestic motorcycle brand in Argentina. The company serves as the local partner for the Benelli, Suzuki, Keeway, Teknial, and Sym motorcycle brands and supports domestic assembly of Benelli and Suzuki motorcycles.

Grupo Corven: Controlled by Leandro Iraola's auto parts company, Grupo Corven is a local assembler of the Mondial, Triumph, Kawasaki, and Kymco motorcycle brands. In August 2025, Corven acquired the commercial representation for Chery from Grupo Macri.

=== Electric vehicle production ===
Under former President Albert Fernández, a small-scale electric vehicle industry emerged in Argentina in response to consumer demand and government mandates. However, in January 2025, incoming President Javier Milei announced Decree 49/25 allowing imports of up to 50,000 electric and hybrid vehicles per year with a 0% tariff on units valued under US$16,000. With top-selling Chinese electric vehicle brands such as BYD, Chery, and Geely preparing for commercial launch in Argentina, the viability of the country's homegrown innovators remains in question.

Coradir SA was first-to-market with local production of electric vehicles by launching the TITO passenger car and TITA lightweight utility vehicle in early 2022. As of March 2024, Coradir had an annual production capacity of 750 units with production plants located in the western city of San Luis.

VOLT Motors, based in Córdoba, produced its first prototype vehicle in 2018 and launched commercial sales in 2024. The company has 150 employees and an annual production capacity of 3,000 vehicles with 60% integration of national parts, many of which were custom-designed for VOLT vehicles.

Sero Electric: The company's electric microcar was first approved for public use in 2021 and launched in early 2022 from a plant in Morón, Buenos Aires province with production capacity of 50 to 60 units per month. Company management claims 80% integration with local parts and has signed export agreements with customers in Brazil, Chile, Italy, and Spain. However, media reports have also emerged that commercial production would migrate to Brazil due to the challenging business environment, lack of financing, and import restrictions in Argentina.

=== Specialty vehicle production ===
Argentine entrepreneurs also operate in niches within both domestic and global automotive markets. Examples of specialty players include:

Helvética SA: A market leader in trailer and semi-trailer manufacturing located at Cañada de Gómez in Sante Fe province. The company specializes in market niches such as trailers with moving floor technology, resulting in a versatile trailer suited for transporting and self-unloading biomass and waste.

Crespi: Local entrepreneurs Tulio and Luciano Crespi operate a race car production facility in Balcarce in Buenos Aires province. In 2024, the company announced the launch of Crespi Concept F1 Cars, which specializes in construction of replica high-performance Formula 1 single-seaters for racing car collectors.

=== Local commercial partners ===
Several groups serve as commercial partners for imported automotive brands, providing local dealership networks, after-sale service support, and domestic assembly. Key players in this segment include:

Grupo Eximar: Owned by local businessperson Federico Pieruzzini, Eximar is the local representative of the Jaguar, Land Rover, Volvo, and Geely in Argentina. In September 2025, Grupo Eximar announced an US$20 million investment to support the upcoming MG brand launch in the Argentine market, including allocations for a dealer network, an initial stock of spare parts, and other launch-related expenses.

Grupo Macri: Sideco Americana is the automotive division of Grupo Macri, which is led by descendants of Franco Macri (father of former Argentine President Mauricio Macri). President Macri sold his stake to his brothers upon taking office in 2015. Sideco is the local partner for Chinese automotive company JAC Motors and assembles the X200 small urban truck at its Ralitor terminal plant at La Plata. In June 2025, Sideco announced that it would add the electric version of the X200 to its production line during the second half of 2025.

== Foreign trade ==
Prior to 2019, the automotive industry operated with a significant trade deficit that averaged over US$6 billion per year from 2016 to 2018. However, the economic downturn that started in late 2018 reduced imports while increasing the amount of capacity available for exports; as a result, the sector's annual trade deficit has averaged only US$60 million since 2019.

Brazil is the top export destination, purchasing over 60% of Argentine vehicle exports, with most of the remainder sold to Chile, Colombia, Peru, and Central America. Trade with Brazil is governed by the bilateral Economic Complementarity Agreement No. 14 within Mercosur. Although the 1991 Treaty of Asunción, which established the Mercosur trade bloc, specifically excluded the automotive sector, the Common Market Council (Mercosur's highest decision-marking authority) issued Decision 29/94 in December 1994 calling for a common automotive regime by January 1, 2000.

In 2019, Brazil and Argentina renewed their bilateral auto trade agreement with the goal of free trade by 2029. In the meantime, Brazil can increase its exports to Argentina under the so-called flex agreement that limits Brazil to selling $1.50 to Argentina for every $1.00 that it buys from Argentina; this ratio will increase to $3.00 by July 2028.

The two governments entered an agreement in August 2022 to reduce non-tariff barriers by recognizing technical certifications for vehicle safety issued by the other country, which authorities claimed would result in a US$13 billion increase in bilateral automotive trade by 2040.

== Industry challenges ==
=== Productivity ===
Like much of Argentina's manufacturing sector, Argentina's automotive industry suffers from low productivity by global standards. Labor productivity during the period 2010-2018 for motor vehicle production in Argentina was estimated to be 10-15% lower than in Brazil and India, 55% lower than in Mexico, and 65% lower than in Thailand.

Productivity challenges in the Argentine motor vehicle industry are partly due to limited economies of scale. Experts believe that an automotive assembly plant requires annual production volume of at least 100,000 to 300,000 units in order to achieve scale efficiencies. In Argentina, only Toyota's Zárate assembly plant, which produced over 180,000 vehicles in 2023, has sufficient scale to be globally competitive. By contrast, the local subsidiaries of General Motors, Ford, Volkswagen, Stellantis, and Renault-Nissan-Mitsubishi produced an average of only 60,000 units per assembly facility in 2023.

However, scale is not the only driver of Argentina's low productivity. Toyota has disclosed that key performance indicators such as operational availability, employee absenteeism, and defects per vehicle at its Zárate facility significantly lagged company benchmarks between 2006 and 2010. The company publicly stated in 2021 that a shortage of skilled labor was an obstacle to its expansion plans in the country and elaborated that many of its job candidates had not completed their secondary education and in some cases lacked basic literacy skills.

=== Innovation ===
As of September 2024, no global automaker has disclosed operating an R&D operation in Argentina. By contrast, Brazil is the South American hub for product development, design, and engineering for multiple companies, including Ford, Nissan, and General Motors.

=== Sustainability ===
Despite holding large reserves of lithium and copper, Argentina is a marginal player in the production of electric and hybrid vehicles. Argentine automotive exports focus on SUVs and pickup trucks, which have lost share to Chinese-made vehicles in the important Brazilian market as consumers there switch to inexpensive electric vehicles (EVs). As a result, during the first eight months of 2024, the proportion of Brazilian automotive imports sourced in Argentina decreased to 46% of total vs. 65% for the same period in 2023. Meanwhile, the share of Brazilian imports from China soared from 8% to 26% of total during the same time period, with most of the increase consisting of EVs.

To date, the EV revolution in Argentina has been led by small-scale local entrepreneurs such as CORADIR, which delivered 500 units of its Tito model during 2023. Domestic production of electric buses also launched in August 2024 when bus operator DOTA S.A. placed an order for the first five zero-emissions MT17.0e buses to be assembled by local manufacturers Agrale and Todo Bus in partnership with British electric drivetrain producer Equipmake.

However, global EV manufacturers have yet to establish operations at scale in Argentina. An announcement by Chery in February 2023 to invest US$400 million in an Argentine assembly plant has not been followed up publicly by the company and is not currently mentioned on the website of its Argentine subsidiary. Chinese Ambassador Wang Wei rekindled hopes for a EV factory in October 2024 by telling Argentine media that “Chinese electric vehicle companies will actively consider setting up factories here in Argentina;” however, no formal announcements have been made.

Similarly, local expectations (or perhaps wishful thinking) that Tesla might open an assembly plant in Argentina emerged after CEO Elon Musk posted on X in May 2024: “I recommend investing in Argentina.” Musk repeated this sentiment in September 2024 with an X post stating: “My companies are actively looking for ways to invest in and support Argentina.” Despite reports that Zárate mayor Marcelo Matzkin offered tax incentives to Tesla, the company has not announced any plans to build a manufacturing facility in Argentina.

Meanwhile, a plan by the outgoing Fernández administration to launch lithium cell and battery manufacturing by UniLiB, a joint venture between state oil giant YPF and the Universidad Nacional de La Plata, was suspended by President Javier Milei amid concerns about the economic viability of the project. As a result, Argentina's participation in the green transition is primarily as a raw materials producer, exemplified by Stellantis’ investments in copper and lithium assets in the country.

== Recent developments ==
Argentina's automotive industry has been severely impacted by the economic downturn that started in mid-2023. During the first eight months of 2024, total automotive industry production at constant prices decreased by -17.4% compared to the same period in 2023.

Exports declined by -8.9% during the first seven months of 2024 compared to the same period in 2023 due to reduced shipments to Chile, Colombia, and Peru.

Automakers have been impacted by the scarcity of foreign currency available to buy imported parts, resulting in production shutdowns for several manufacturers in early 2024. General Motors’ Alvear plant suspended production from December 29, 2023 to March 4, 2024. Several manufacturers have implemented layoffs, including Toyota, which laid off 400 employees in March 2024, and Volkswagen, which laid off 300 employees in August 2024.

However, even in the midst of this severe downturn, Argentina's automotive sector continues to attract greenfield foreign direct investment. The first nine months of 2024 have seen announcements by Stellantis (US$655 million), Renault (US$300 million), Toyota (US$50 million), and Honda (US$15 million) for capital investment over the next five years in Argentina. These announcements demonstrate that global automakers remain confident about Argentina's long-term potential as a market and regional production base.
