= Mercedes-Benz Argentina =

Automotive manufacturer in Argentina

Mercedes-Benz Argentina S.A.U.

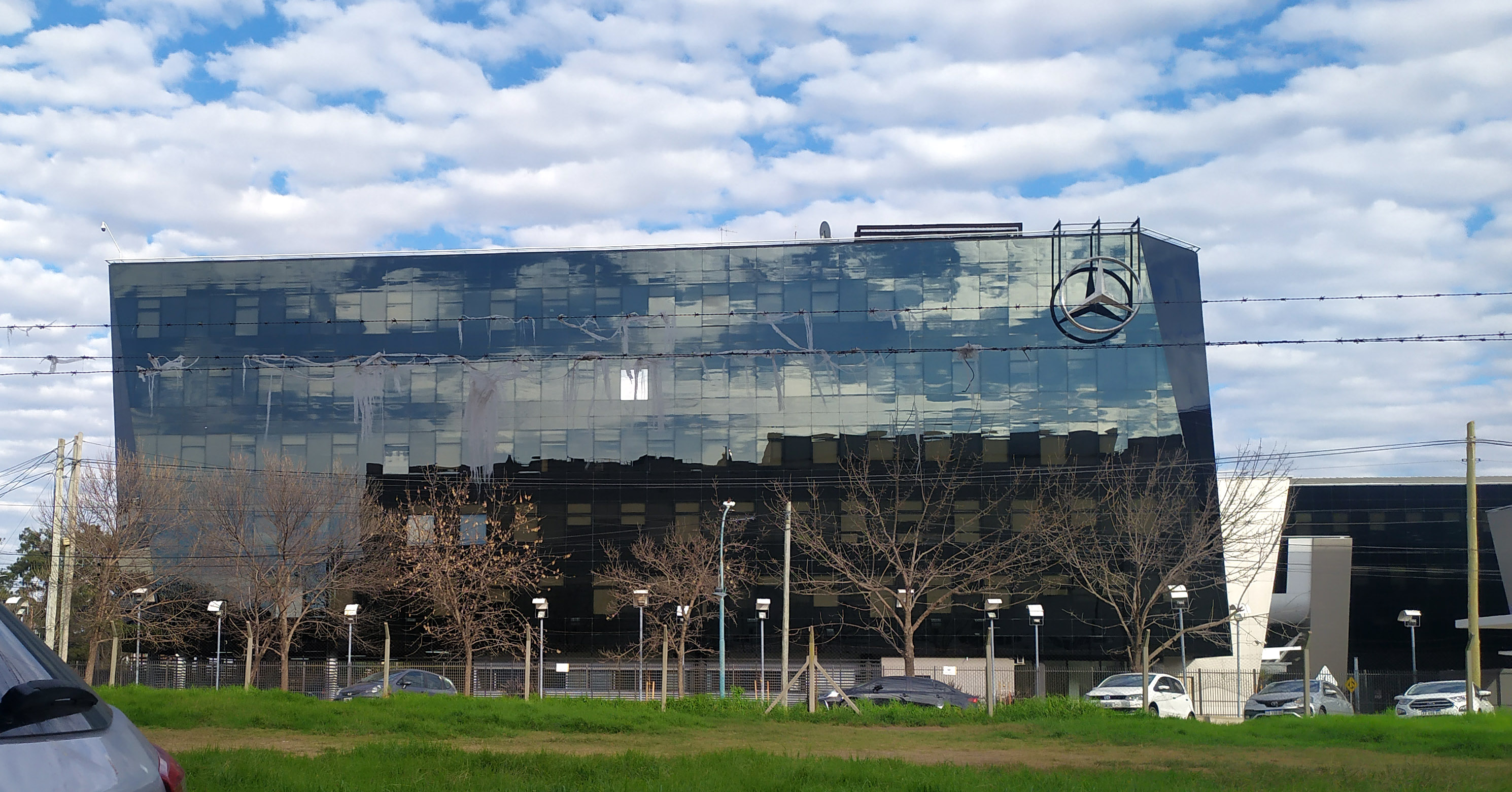
- Company headquarters in Munro, Buenos Aires Province, 2024
- Type: Subsidiary
- Industry: Automotive
- Founded: 1951; 75 years ago
- Headquarters: Munro, Buenos Aires, Argentina
- Area served: Argentina
- Key people: Manuel Mantilla (CEO); Juan Manuel Fangio (Honorary President, 1974–1995)
- Products: Trucks, bus chassis, vans
- Brands: Mercedes-Benz; Mercedes-AMG
- Number of employees: 2,000 (2022)
- Parent: Mercedes-Benz Group
- Website: mercedes-benz.com.ar

Mercedes-Benz Argentina S.A.U. is the Argentine subsidiary of international conglomerate Mercedes-Benz Group which produces and markets Mercedes-Benz utility vehicles in the country. The company (headquartered in Munro, district of Buenos Aires Province) was established in 1951 and has its assembly plant in Virrey del Pino, La Matanza Partido, where trucks and buses have been produced. Furthermore, MBA imports a wide range of luxury automobile models including sedans, SUVs, and AMG performance cars.

The company was the first subsidiary of Mercedes-Benz AG outside Germany. As of 2022, it has 2,022 employees.

Former racing car driver and five-time F1 world drivers' champion, Juan Manuel Fangio, was named "lifetime honorary president" of the company in 1974. It was the only time Mercedes-Benz had such honorary position in the history of the company.

== History ==
=== Beginning ===
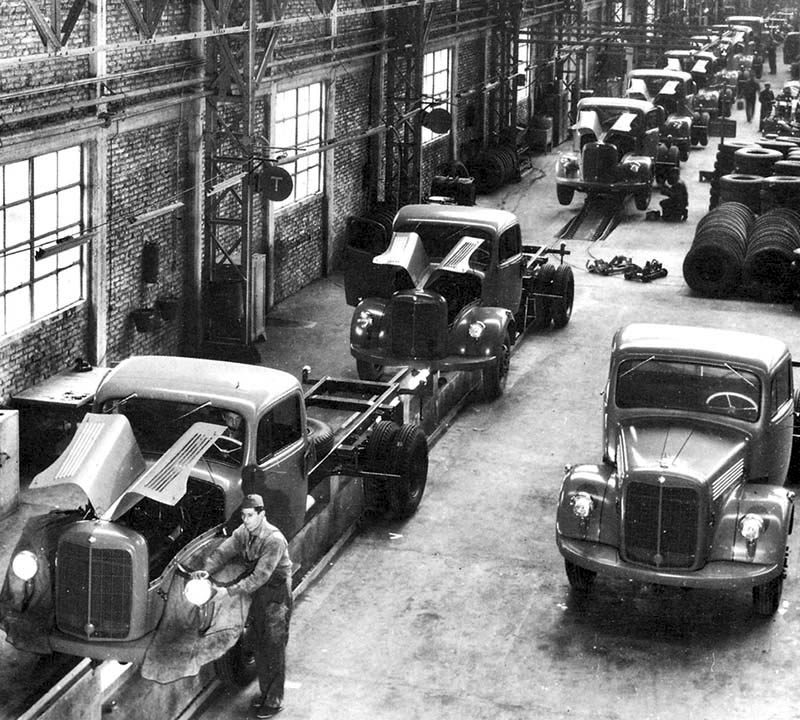
Assembly of the first utility vehicles in early 1950s

On September 6, 1951, "Mercedes-Benz Argentina" was founded as S.R.L. The company's first board of directors was made up of Jorge Antonio, Atilio Gómez, Germán Timmermann and Cesar Rubín, with Dr. Roig acting as trustee. The following year, L3500 trucks began to be assembled at a plant in San Martín Partido. At the same time the factory began production of the first 170 SD cars and different versions of the utility model 170 D for combi, pick-up and cargo box.

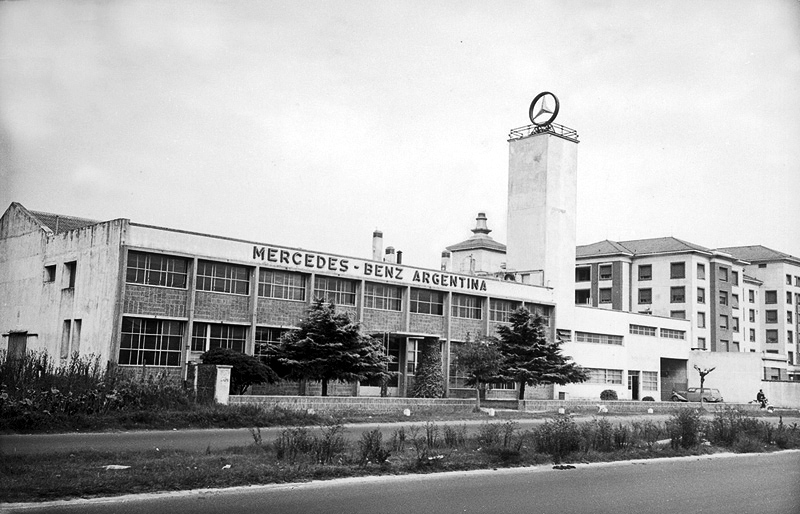
The plant in Virrey del Pino c. 1952

In 1952 Mercedes-Benz Argentina was incorporated as "Sociedad Anónima" and the company acquired a land on NR 3 km 43.5 in González Catán where the first MB integrated production plant outside Germany was built. The plant had a covered area of 85,000 m3 and a production capacity of 600 units per month to supply the cargo and passenger market.

That same year the company carried out its plans for the manufacture and assembly of L3500, L4500 and L6600 models. The assembly of the LO 3500 bus and the L5400 truck also began. In 1954, MBA inaugurated its head office in the city of Buenos Aires, with the presence of the German Chancellor, Ludwig Erhard, among other personalities. The assembly of the L 6600 truck began. Soon after, MBA started production of gearboxes and began assembling OP 3500 buses. At the end of that year, the political changes in Argentina directly affected the company, which was taken over by the dictatorial government calling itself Revolución Libertadora ("Liberating Revolution"), which paralysed production.

A legal case is under way in which a senior manager of the company is accused of involvement in the disappearances and murders of trade union activists carried out by Argentine security forces.

=== Expansion ===
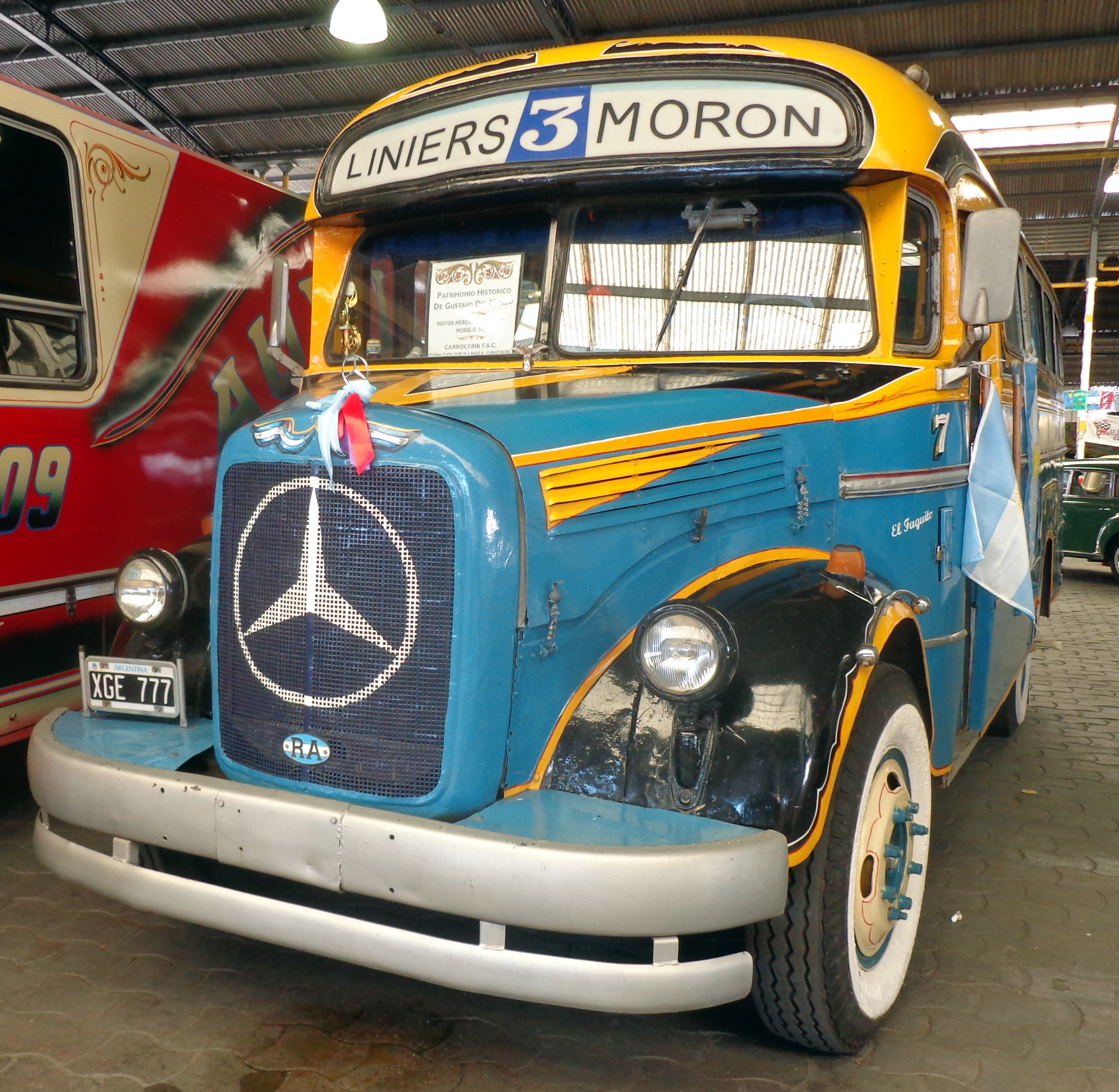
L 312 bus (colectivo) started to be produced in early 1960s

The San Martín plant closed in July 1956 and all production concentrated in the González Catán factory. In 1958 the intervention of the company was lifted and a new board of directors was appointed. The following year, the construction works for a second plant were completed. Production of the L 311/312 trucks and LO 311/312 buses began. The 1960s began with administrative changes in the company that passed into the hands of Daimler-Benz AG. Two years later, the OM 321 engine was industrialized and in 1963 the 10,000th Mercedes-Benz unit manufactured in the country rolled off the assembly lines.

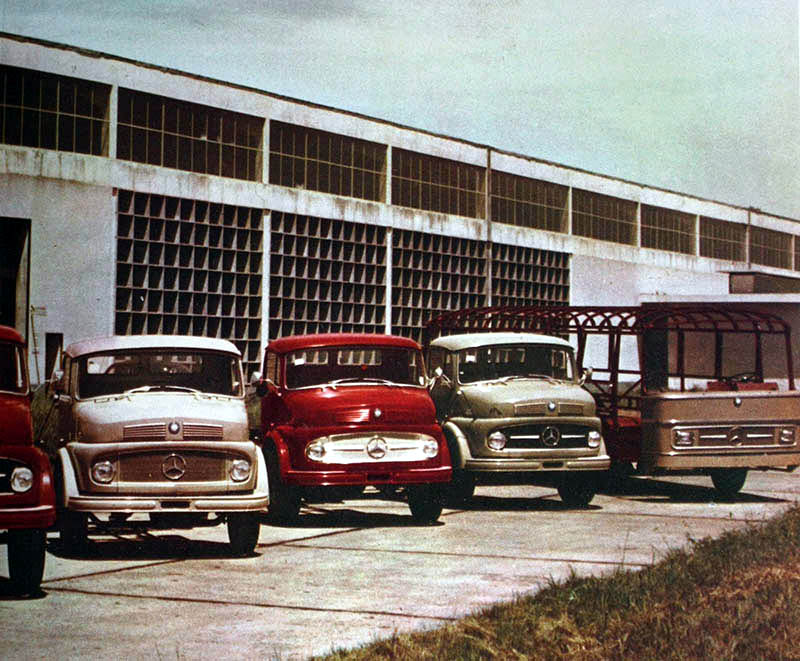
Mercedes Benz trucks and buses at the González Catán plant in late 1960s

In 1965, the assembly of the L 1112 model began with a new cabin with a short hood, an increase in engine power from 95 to 120 hp and a reinforced two-speed rear axle. This line was expanded in 1967 with the launch of the LA 1112 model, with all-wheel drive. That year began mass production of the L 1114 truck with the OM 352 direct injection engine and 140 hp, the O 120 medium-distance bus with a self-supporting platform, and the L 911 truck.

In 1968 the O 120 buses were replaced by the O 140 type with a 130 hp engine. The following year, the light truck L 608 D was launched on the market with an OM 314 engine and a power of 85 hp. This vehicle, with a frontal design cabin, was agile and versatile for the urban environment and its chassis was suitable for different applications from freight to passenger transport. Another novelty of the year was the launch of the Unimog with different engine options. Its innovative transmission system allowed it to adapt to various driving conditions in various terrains and was widely used by the Argentine Army.

=== The 1970s ===
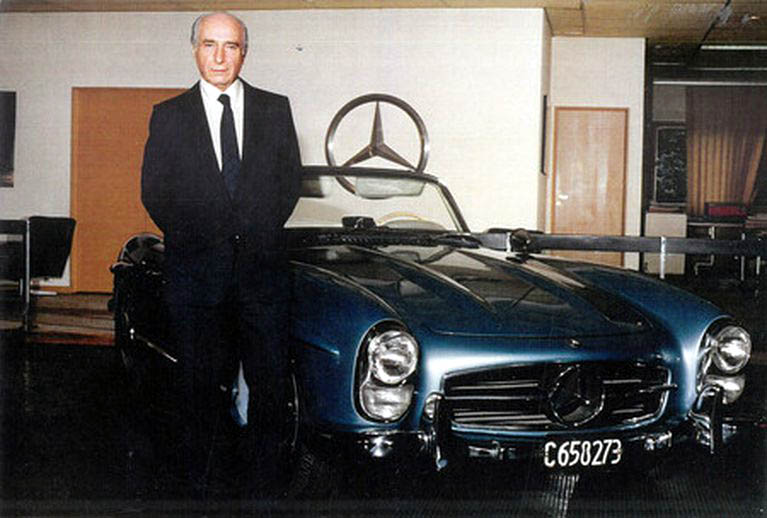
Juan Manuel Fangio was honorary president of MBA since 1974 until his death in 1995

In 1971 the 220 D pick up began to be produced. It was equipped with a 65 hp diesel engine and offered a load capacity of 650 kilos. In 1972, the chassis for buses with a wheelbase of 5.17 meters began to be manufactured. In 1974, the L 1517 semi-heavy truck was launched with an OM 352 A supercharged engine with a power of 156 hp and a new 2-speed rear axle, hydraulic steering and a reinforced gearbox. That same year, 5-time F1 world champion Juan Manuel Fangio was appointed president of the MBA board, a position he held until 1987, when he became honorary president until his death in 1995.

In the second half of the decade the product range continued to expand. In 1975, the production of the medium-sized truck model L 914 began. Two years later, the mass production of chassis for buses and buses with hydraulic steering was added. Production began of the L 1514 medium truck, the LO 914 bus and the O 170 bus model, as a successor to the O 140 with a supercharged OM 352 A engine with 156 hp and reinforced axles and suspension.

On the night of November 30, 1977, a fire in Plant II caused losses in around 8,000 square meters in the basements. Despite the seriousness of the incident that affected, among others, the assembly line, the engine test benches and the upholstery area, Mercedes-Benz Argentina managed to resume activities in just two weeks of intense work.

The following year the truck line received upgrades with the introduction of the high roof cab. In 1979 the manufacture of the bus chassis, frontal model, OC-1214, began. Production of the L 1521 model began with the OM 355/5 5-cylinder engine with a power of 192 hp, ZF gearbox and GV-80 gearbox. New cab on the 1517 and 1521 models and with a G3/60 box for the L 1517.

On September 1 of that year, the reconstructed plant was inaugurated with a new assembly line, a new upholstery line, a new measurement room and a new material deposit.

=== Public road transport ===
In 1980, improvements made to the L 1517 truck, including the 160 hp engine, allowed the model name to be changed to L 1518. At Plant II, the new engine test benches began to function. The following year the OH 1419 bus was produced. In 1982 the first bus in the country powered by Compressed Natural Gas (CNG) was built and its two new models were launched on the market: the OF 1114 and the OF 1214.

During that year, the new facilities of the medical service in González Catán were inaugurated, with an area of 640 square meters and the new line of vehicles for urban passenger transport LO 1114 with automatic gearbox was presented. Other launches of the year were the new OF 114 front chassis, intended for export, and the OH 1314 bus chassis with rear engine, with and without automatic gearbox.

In 1987 Mercedes-Benz Argentina revolutionized public passenger transport by launching the new line of front-mounted buses with a rear engine (the “OH”), which replaced the classic buses with a nose and a front engine. That year, the manufacture of the 50,000th collective was celebrated at its plant in González Catán, province of Buenos Aires. At that time, the acceptance of the brand in the urban bus market was so great that it allowed it to reach 93%.

=== Merger with Chrysler ===
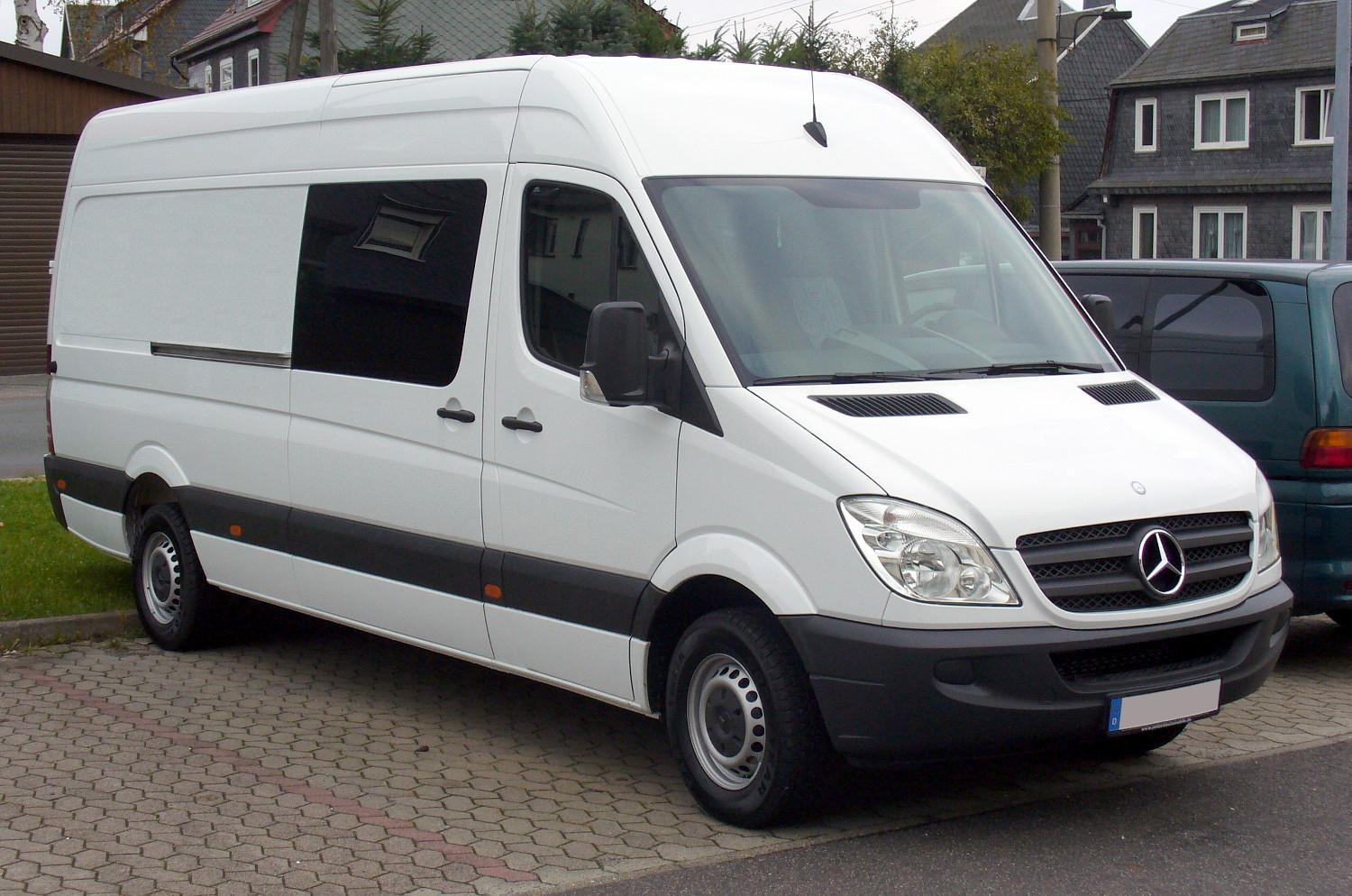
The Sprinter van was launched in 1996 and has been produced since then

In 1996, the plant was transformed into a high-tech center for the manufacture of utility vehicles and buses, renamed "Juan Manuel Fangio Industrial Center". That same year, the Sprinter was launched. The model, featuring van, minibus, and chassis cab versions, became a success with more than 350,000 units produced as of October 2021.

On May 3, 2000, Mercedes-Benz Argentina and Chrysler Argentina merged into "DaimlerChrysler Argentina S.A." On November 20 of that same year, unit 50,000 of the Sprinter utility vehicle was produced. A year later MBA began production of the right-hand drive version of the Sprinter, which were exported to Australia, South Africa and New Zealand. The investment made for the operation was US$ 10 million. Some of the staff received training at the plant in Düsseldorf, Germany. In total, 1,500 right-hand drive Sprinters were exported. The partnership with Chrysler was dissolved in 2007. From then on, the company was renamed Mercedes-Benz Argentina again.

=== Later years ===
The company expanded its range of trucks with the Atron, launched in 2013. The Vito minivan was added to MBA's production line in 2015. The model was produced until 2020, and has been imported from Brazil since then.

MBA started production of the Atego trucks in 2016. This model was followed by the Accelo in 2019.

In 2026, Mercedes-Benz Trucks and Buses inaugurated the Centro Industrial de Zárate, its new factory in Zárate, following a total investment of US$ 110 million. The Zárate Industrial Center will initially house the assembly of Atego and Accelo trucks, as well as OH and OF bus chassis. According to Mercedes, this is the first facility built in the automotive sector in Argentina in the last 15 years.

== Vehicles ==
=== Produced ===
List of Mercedes-Benz Argentina vehicles produced since its inception:

==== Current model ====
Name	Type	Origin	Release	Image
Sprinter	Van	ARG	1996	

=== Imported ===
- A-Class
- C-Class
- E-Class
- G-Class
- GLA SUV
- GLB SUV
- GLC SUV
- GLE SUV
