= Tobías Ramírez =

Argentine footballer (born 2006)

Personal information
- Full name: Tobías Emanuel Ramírez Cardozo
- Date of birth: 11 November 2006 (age 19)
- Place of birth: Virrey del Pino, Buenos Aires, Argentina
- Height: 1.85 m (6 ft 1 in)
- Position: Central defender

Team information
- Current team: River Plate
- Number: 2

Youth career
- 2015–2024: Argentinos Juniors

Senior career*
| Years | Team | Apps | (Gls) |
| 2024–2026 | Argentinos Juniors | 34 | (0) |
| 2026– | River Plate | 1 | (0) |

International career
| 2022–2023 | Argentina U17 | 27 | (0) |
| 2024– | Argentina U20 | | |
Medal record
Men's football
Representing Argentina
FIFA U-20 World Cup
| Runner-up | 2025 Chile |
South American U-20 Championship
| Runner-up | 2025 Venezuela |
- * Club domestic league appearances and goals as of 17:35, 13 April 2026 (UTC)

Tobías Emanuel Ramírez Cardozo (née Tobías Emanuel Palacio; born 11 November 2006) is an Argentine footballer currently playing as a defender for Argentine Primera División club River Plate.

== Club career ==
=== Argentinos Juniors ===
Ramírez was born in Virrey del Pino in the Buenos Aires Province of Argentina. He began his career with Argentinos Juniors in 2015, at the age of 9. On 28 January 2024 he made his professional debut in a match against River Plate. On 9 April 2024, he made his debut in Copa Sudamericana in a match against Racing Club de Montevideo.

=== River Plate ===
On March 31 2026, he was officially presented as a new River Plate player with a four-year contract and a €100 million release clause.

== International career ==
Ramírez has represented Argentina at under-17 level. In 2023, he participated at the South American U-17 Championship and FIFA U-17 World Cup, he participated under the name Tobías Palacio before changing his name in 2024.

== Honours ==
Argentina U20

- FIFA U-20 World Cup runner-up: 2025
