= Colombres =

Colombres may refer to:

- Colombres (Argentina)
- Colombres (Ribadedeva)
