= Vmoto =

Australian manufacturer and distributor of electric motorcycles

- Type: Public
- Industry: Motor vehicle manufacturing; Motor vehicle distribution
- Founded: 1999; 27 years ago in Perth, Australia
- Founder: Patrick Davin
- Headquarters: Perth
- Area served: Australia
- Key people: Charles Chen
- Website: Vmoto

Vmoto is a manufacturer and distributor of electric motorcycles that was founded in Perth, Australia, with a manufacturing facility located in Nanjing, China.

The Nanjing factory of Vmoto produces the electric motorcycles of the Super Soco brand, and these are distributed internationally through the Vmoto Soco group, an entity controlled by Vmoto.

In recent years, the company has steadily increased the prominence of the Vmoto brand, with the newly released models carrying exclusively Vmoto branding.

== History ==
=== Founding and formation ===
The group has its origins in Vmoto Motorcycles, a scooter distributor business which was founded by Perth entrepreneur Patrick Davin in 1999. An ASX-listed company, the Optima group, acquired the Vmoto brand in 2006, and Davin was appointed as managing director the following year, after which the company took on the name of the motorcycle brand.

A period of rapid consolidation followed on from the Vmoto acquisition. At the end of 2006, Vmoto announced a formal agreement to acquire the Shanghai-based motorcycle trading and distribution company Freedomotor. The managing director of Freedomotor, Charles Chen, joined the board of the company following the acquisition, which was completed on the first day of the new year.

In 2008 the company commenced the construction of a scooter assembly plant in Nanjing, China, which was completed the following year. In December of the same year, Vmoto entered into a strategic agreement with the German electric scooter company, E-max, initially acquiring 60% of the company in December 2009, then taking full control of the company in 2010. The company also started supplying electric engines for the Vietnamese market.

The acquisition of E-Max charted the long term path of the company, with electric two-wheelers remaining at the core of the Vmoto's future activities.

In November 2010, the Vmoto founder Patrick Davin resigned as managing director, to be replaced by Charles Chen, and Russel Goodman, the largest shareholder in the company, took up the position of Executive Chairman in the wake of the departure, only to be removed from his position early in the new year. Subsequently, the former chairman made good on threats to liquidate his entire position in the company.

The resignation of Davin and Goodman marked the beginning of an extended period of inertia for the company. The E-Max electric scooters produced by the company proved to be something of a flop, with less than one hundred sold in Australia. An attempt in 2012 to gain a foothold in the Chinese market via an agreement with a Chinese automotive group seemed to initially offer promise, but the change of direction ultimately failed to revive the fortunes of the company, and the company floundered for several years thereafter. The company continued to push research in its production, and technology relating to "green" handlebars was licensed to another scooter manufacturer in Dusheng, China in 2014.

2015 saw increased exports of Vmoto scooters to overseas markets, especially Nepal, where a petrol shortage prompted by the Nepal blockade imposed on that country by India sharply boosted demand for electric two-wheelers.

The chair of the company was vacant for some time, before finally being filled by Phillip Campbell in 2017, after a share trading halt.

=== Expansion and partnership with Super Soco ===
In 2017, Vmoto entered into an informal partnership with an emerging Chinese EV company, Super Soco. An agreement was signed under which Super Soco relocated to the Nanjing manufacturing facility of Vmoto, which was not at full capacity. That year the two companies conjointly presented at the EICMA motorcycle event in Milan.

The commencement of the relationship with Super Soco marked a shift in direction for the company, the company reducing its exposure to China from China in favour of western markets.

In 2019, Vmoto entered into an agreement with Ducati, producing a special edition Super Soco scooter bedecked in the signature Ducati branding.

In February 2020, Vmoto formalised their strategic relationship with Super Soco, through the establishment of a joint venture, Vmoto Soco. As per the terms of this agreement, Vmoto gained international distribution rights over the Super Soco models, as well as its existing E-Max brand. Vmoto Soco also became the exclusive manufacturer of the Super Soco motorcycle range.

In November the following year, Vmoto pushed into the e-bike segment, entering into a strategic partnership with Stealth Electric Bikes and C-creative.

=== Brand re-launch ===
In November 2021, the company embarked on an initiative to revitalise their faded brand, engaging a European design firm for the purpose, and employing their platform at the 2021 Milan EICMA motorcycle event to showcase the brand re-boot. During the event, the company unveiled the first premium motorcycle model to be produced by the group, the Vmoto Stash, aimed at the European and North American markets.

Vmoto launched a new fleet concept scooter, the Fleet Concept F01. The scooter features a 90 kilometres (56 mi) range, has double disk brakes and a combined braking system, and is aimed at B2B and for business fleets for commercial operations.

Earlier in the same year, the company supplied five scooters to the MotoE World Cup organisers for the use of staff during the events.

At the EICMA event in November 2022, Vmoto launched the new 'Stash' motorcycle, which had been showcased at the same event in the previous year. The company also unveiled an electric dirt bike at the same event.

=== Ride Share market push ===
In 2020, Vmoto began pushing into the electric Scooter-sharing system business. This saw Vmoto offer bulk scooters to commercial fleet operators of ride share scooters, in a number of different countries.

By 2021, the company was supplying scooters to seven different ride share operations globally, and was in discussion with another 12.

=== Acquisition of UK Distributor ===
In March 2023, Vmoto Distribution UK, which had been the importer and distributor of Vmoto and Super Soco branded motorcycles in the United Kingdom since 2015, announced it had formally entered into administration.

The following month, Vmoto Limited announced that it had entered into an agreement to acquire the UK Distributor for A$1 million, thereby providing Vmoto with proximate access to dealers of the motorcycle brand across in a key market of the group.

=== Global Partnerships ===
In November, 2022, Vmoto entered into a partnership with Charged Indonesia, a provider of e-motorcycle-as-a-service subscriptions.

In December 2022, VMotoSoco entered into an exclusive agreement with FortunEV, the group company of Future Motor Corporation for the India Market. The company is launching the CPx and a new TS in the first phase.

On the 24th of July, 2023, Vmoto and Malaysia's Ni Hsin EV signed an MOU for the assembling, marketing and distribution of electric vehicles, offering Vmoto a gateway into the Malaysian market.

Other global partners of the company include Zenion in the UK, Vanmo in Brazil, Modenas in Malaysia, Nova Moto in South Africa and Skipper Run in Thailand.

In June 2025, Vmoto announced that it had entered into a partnership with Uber Eats to financially incentivise couriers in a number of European cities to switch to electric vehicles. Under the partnership, Uber Eats and Vmoto will also work to establish London’s first battery-swap pilot for e-mopeds.

At the end of the same year, Vmoto signed a cooperation agreement with Thailand’s AJ Advanced Technologies and Guangdong DHA to launch a large‑scale electric motorcycle battery‑swapping and fast‑charging project in Thailand.

=== Entry into South Asian markets ===
In 2026, Vmoto entered the Bangladeshi market, making its debut at the Dhaka Motor Show in April that year. The company’s operations in Bangladesh were managed by a local distributor, Simba Motors.
