= Jorge Lorenzo =

Spanish motorcycle racer (born 1987)

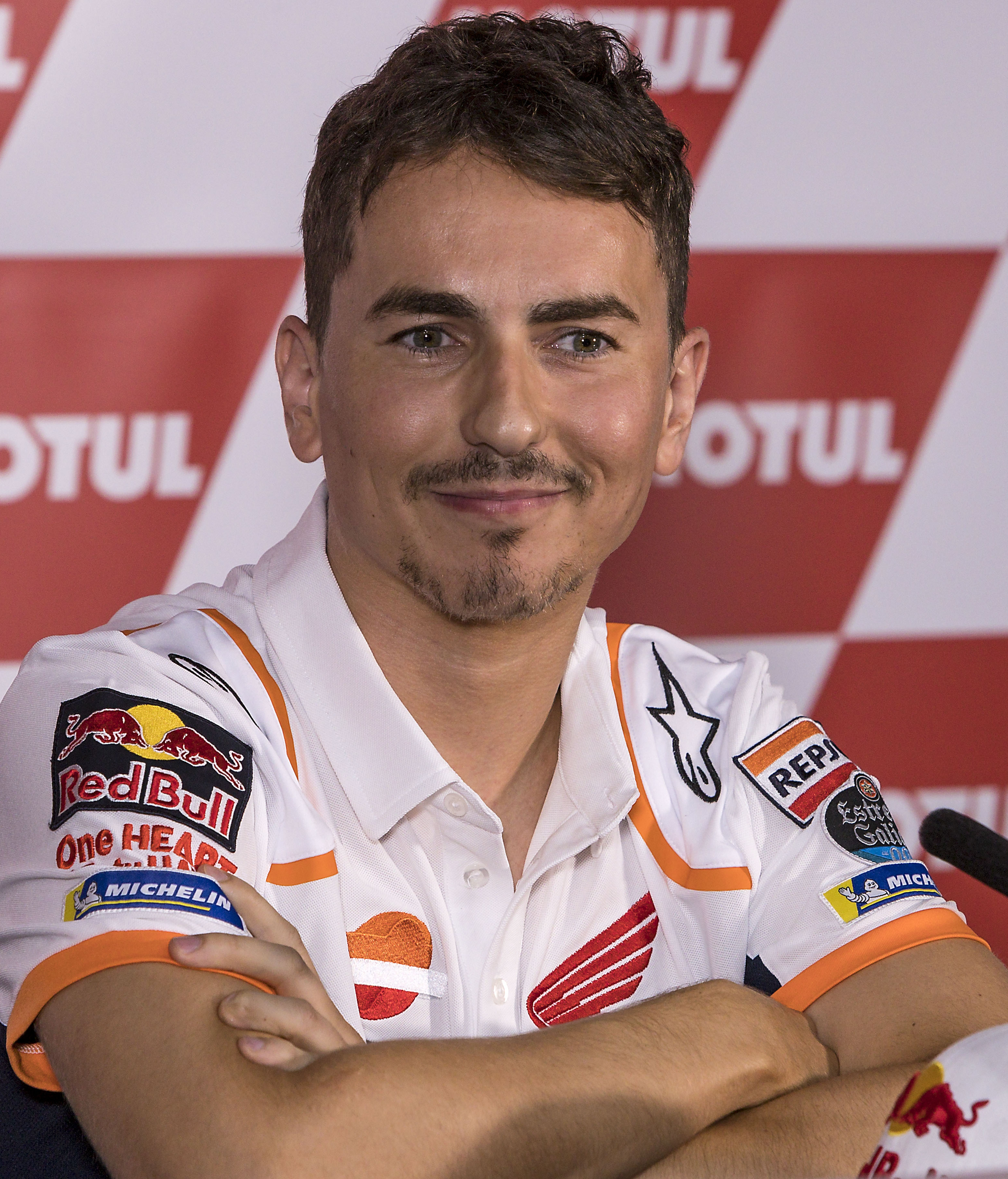
- Lorenzo in 2019
- Nationality: Spanish
- Born: 4 May 1987 (age 39); Palma de Mallorca, Spain
- Website: jorgelorenzo.com
Motorcycle racing career statistics
MotoGP World Championship
Active years	2008–2019
Manufacturers	Yamaha (2008–2016); Ducati (2017–2018); Honda (2019)
Championships	3 (2010, 2012, 2015)
2019 championship position	19th (28 pts)
Starts / Wins / Podiums / Poles / F. laps / Points; 203 / 47 / 114 / 43 / 30 / 2899
250cc World Championship
Active years	2005–2007
Manufacturers	Honda (2005); Aprilia (2006–2007)
Championships	2 (2006, 2007)
2007 championship position	1st (312 pts)
Starts / Wins / Podiums / Poles / F. laps / Points; 48 / 17 / 29 / 23 / 4 / 768
125cc World Championship
Active years	2002–2004
Manufacturers	Derbi
Championships	0
2004 championship position	4th (179 pts)
Starts / Wins / Podiums / Poles / F. laps / Points; 46 / 4 / 9 / 3 / 3 / 279

Jorge Lorenzo Guerrero (Spanish pronunciation: [ˈxoɾxe loˈɾenθo ɣeˈreɾo]; born 4 May 1987) is a Spanish former Grand Prix motorcycle racer. He is a five-time World Champion, having won three titles in the MotoGP class (2010, 2012 and 2015) and two titles in 250cc (2006 and 2007).

After winning the 2006 and 2007 250cc World Championships, Lorenzo moved to MotoGP in 2008 to ride for the factory Yamaha team. In his first season, he was named Rookie of the Year after taking a race win in Portugal and finishing in fourth in the championship standings. The nine seasons he spent with Yamaha were highly successful: he won the championship on three occasions, in 2010, 2012 and 2015, and finished as runner-up in 2009, 2011 and 2013.

Lorenzo moved to the Ducati factory team in 2017. He struggled in his first season with Ducati, recording only three podium positions. He finished seventh in the championship, while his teammate and former 250cc rival Andrea Dovizioso placed runner-up on equal machinery. In 2018, Lorenzo regained form with victories in Mugello, Catalunya and Austria and a second place finish in Brno. Lorenzo made an ill-fated move to Repsol Honda in 2019, and retired at the end of a disastrous season.

Lorenzo ranks fifth on the list of all-time premier class race winners, with 47 victories from 203 starts, and third on the list of all-time premier class podium finishes, with 114. In 2022, he was inducted into the MotoGP Hall of Fame as an official Legend by the FIM. Despite his retirement from riding, Lorenzo remains active in motorsports, having competed in the Porsche Carrera Cup Italia in 2022 and 2023 with Team Q8 Hi Perform, and the Porsche Supercup and the Italian GT Championship with Lazarus Corse. He also performs color commentary at select MotoGP races.

== Career ==
=== 125cc & 250cc World Championship ===
Lorenzo made his championship debut on his fifteenth birthday, on the second qualifying day for the 2002 125cc Spanish Grand Prix, after having missed Friday practice, due to not being old enough to race (minimum age regulations). Lorenzo dominated the 2007 250cc World Championship. His nine pole positions led to nine victories in 2007.

Lorenzo's victory at Misano in 2007 was his 16th in the 250cc class, making him the most successful Spanish rider of all time in the intermediate class – with one more victory than Dani Pedrosa and Sito Pons.

=== MotoGP World Championship ===
After being linked with a Yamaha MotoGP ride for 2008, on 25 July 2007 he was confirmed as Valentino Rossi's partner on a two-year deal for the 2008 MotoGP season.

==== 2008 ====
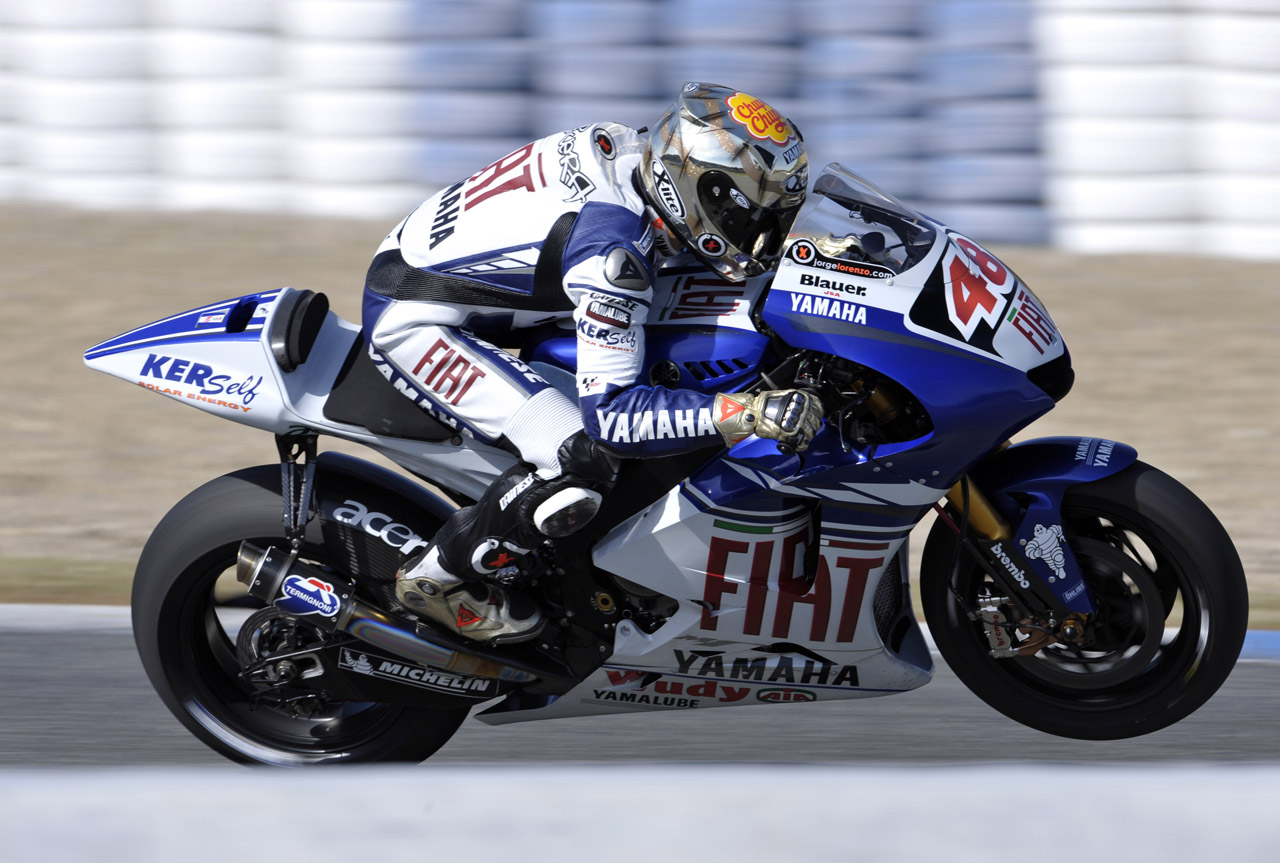
Lorenzo during pre-season testing at Jerez

Lorenzo made a great start to his MotoGP career, finishing second after qualifying on pole for the Qatar night race. He followed this up with pole at the second round in Jerez, Spain and third position, and pole in round 3 at Estoril, Portugal. He converted this pole into a victory, his maiden win in the Premier Class. In doing so, he became the youngest rider in MotoGP to finish on the podium in his first three races, taking the record from compatriot and rival Dani Pedrosa by a single day.

By this stage of the Championship, Lorenzo was in joint first place with Pedrosa, but on 1 May 2008, Lorenzo was thrown from his bike during practice for the MotoGP Grand Prix of China. Lorenzo suffered a chipped bone and snapped ligament in his left ankle, and a fractured bone in his right. He was still able to finish the race in fourth place. Two weeks later at Le Mans, Lorenzo suffered two accidents in the practice sessions but managed to post a second-place result. In the following race at Mugello, he crashed during the race after qualifying seventh on the grid, The next week in Barcelona, he experienced his fifth crash in four meetings, the practice session accident forcing him to miss the race.

At both Donington Park and Assen, Lorenzo was observed to be riding more conservatively after a series of injuries, but moved up the order in the later part of the race to finish sixth in each case. He has commented that he is stronger in the latter parts of races, preferring the bike when it is low on fuel. In the next meeting at Sachsenring, however, Lorenzo crashed out of the race during very wet conditions. Lorenzo suffered yet more injuries to his feet at the USGP at Mazda Raceway Laguna Seca on 20 July, when he experienced his seventh crash in only three months. During the first lap, a spectacular highside left Lorenzo with a sore right foot (or ankle) and three broken bones in his left foot, specifically the third, fourth and fifth metatarsals. At Misano, Lorenzo clinched second place. Indianapolis saw him on the podium again, this time in third position. He eventually finished the season in fourth position.

==== 2009 ====
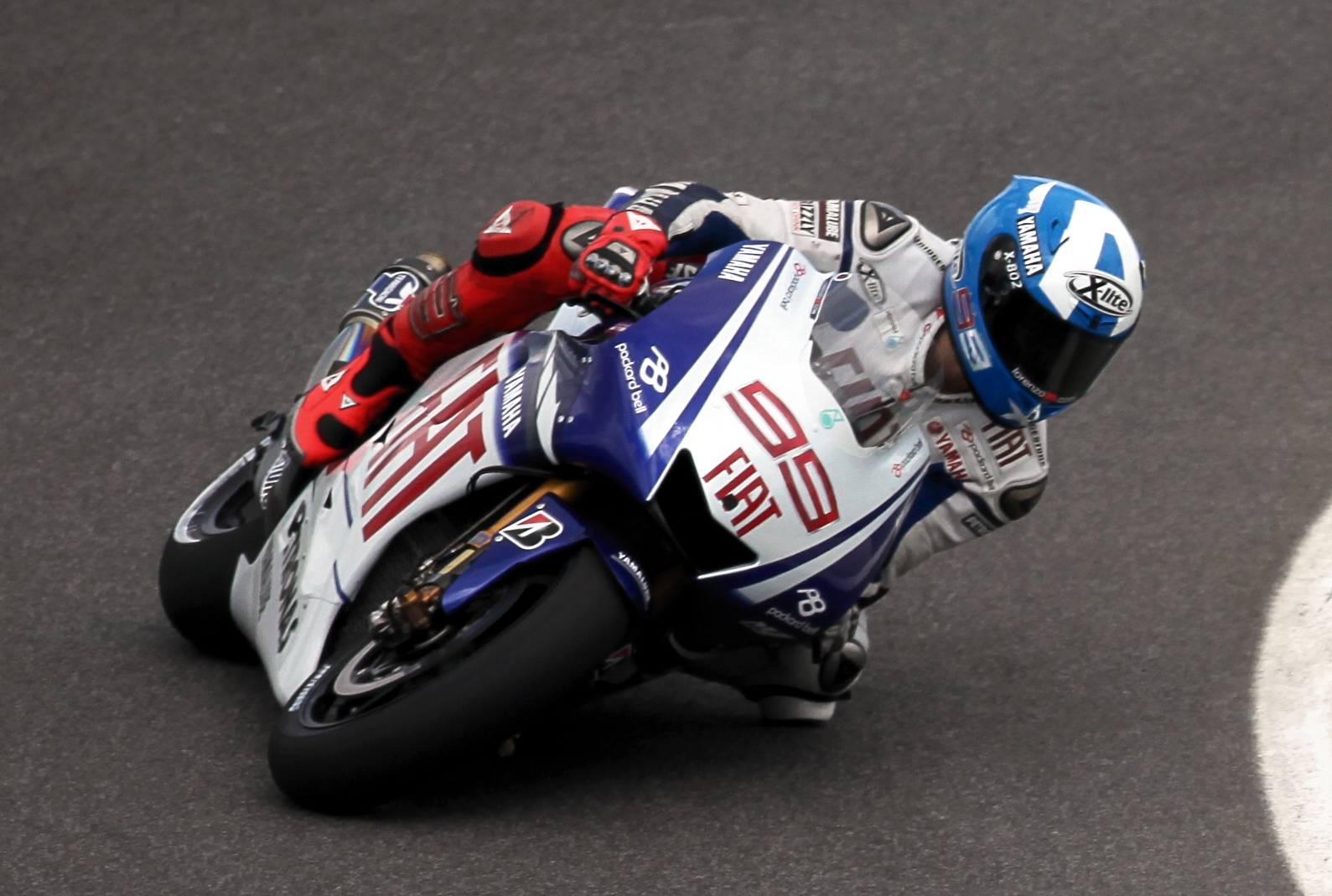
Lorenzo at the 2009 Indianapolis Grand Prix

In 2009, Lorenzo stayed with Yamaha. His season started well, with two wins – at Motegi and Le Mans – and two more podiums out of five races, leading the championship up until that point after which Valentino Rossi stole the momentum from him in the Catalan Grand Prix.

As a consequence of a crash in qualifying at the Laguna Seca round, Lorenzo suffered a small fracture in the head of the fourth metatarsal in his right foot, contusions to the bones in both ankles and damage to his collarbone in his right shoulder. Two crashes later in the season, during the rain hit British Grand Prix and at Brno hampered his title bid, as he was 50 points behind championship leader Valentino Rossi prompting Lorenzo to claim his chances of winning the title have gone. He won at Indianapolis, while both Rossi and Pedrosa crashed, reducing Lorenzo's gap to Rossi to 25 points. His first corner crash with Nicky Hayden in Australia was a blow to his title chances and Rossi clinched the title with a third-place finish in Malaysia.

==== 2010 ====
On 25 August 2009, Lorenzo ended speculation surrounding a possible move to Honda or Ducati by signing a contract to race with Yamaha in the 2010 MotoGP Championship. Ducati reputedly offered him a $15 million contract to take the seat vacated by Marco Melandri which was eventually taken by Nicky Hayden.

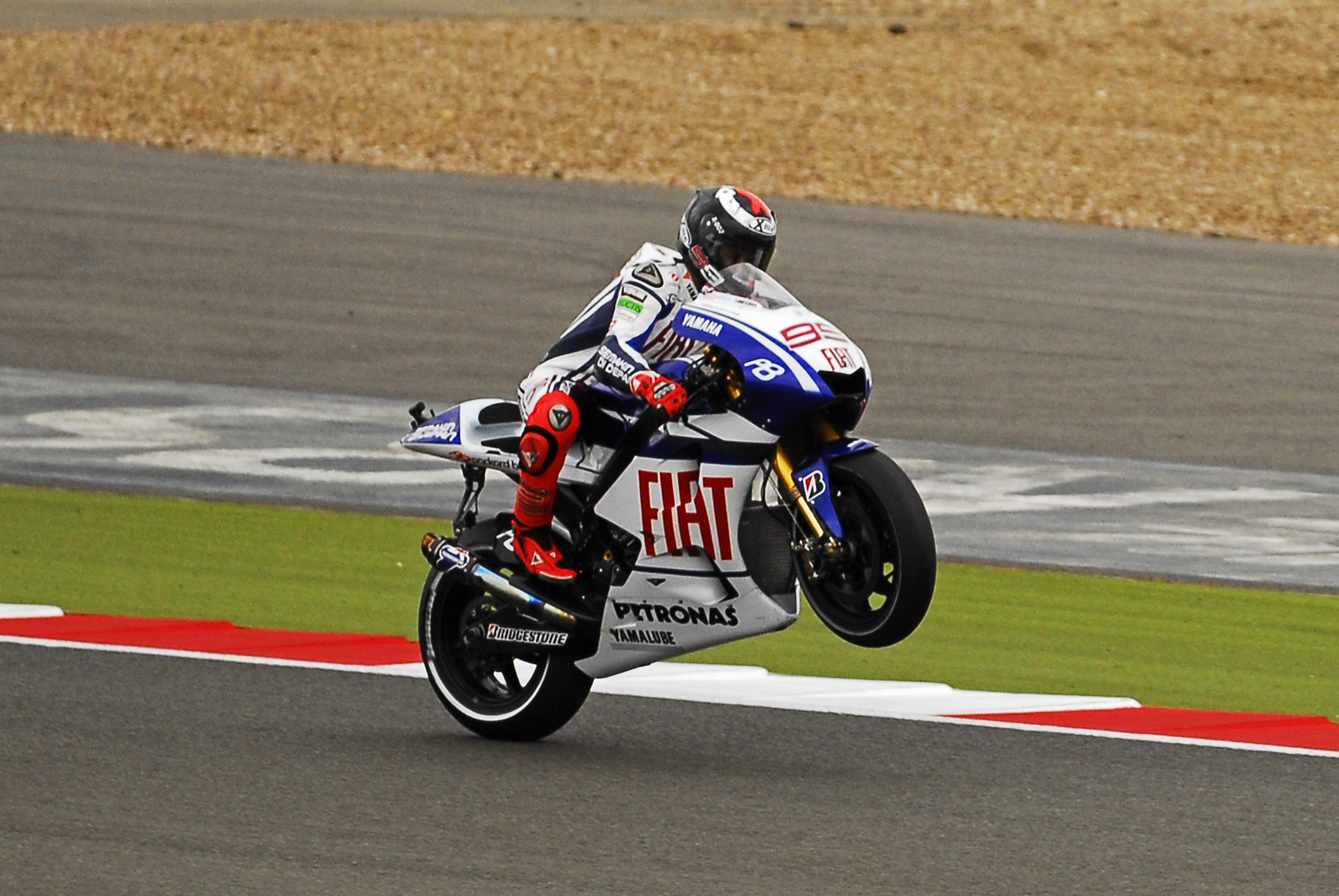
Lorenzo at the 2010 British Grand Prix

Lorenzo broke two bones in his hand in a pocket bike crash pre-season, therefore missing most of the pre-season testing. He fought through the field to finish second to Rossi in the season opener in Qatar, whilst still not fully fit. After Rossi broke his leg in a crash at Mugello, Lorenzo became the title favourite, with a 47-point lead after four wins in the first six rounds. Victory at Assen made him only the seventh rider ever to win in three classes at this prestigious circuit.

Despite nearest rival Dani Pedrosa making up ground in the latter stages of the season, Lorenzo was still in control with five races remaining. Pedrosa, the only man who could still overtake Lorenzo in the standings, then suffered a broken collarbone during practice, causing him to miss the next two races and virtually guaranteeing Lorenzo would become champion. On 10 October, Lorenzo clinched the title with a third-place finish at Sepang behind Rossi and Andrea Dovizioso.

==== 2011 ====
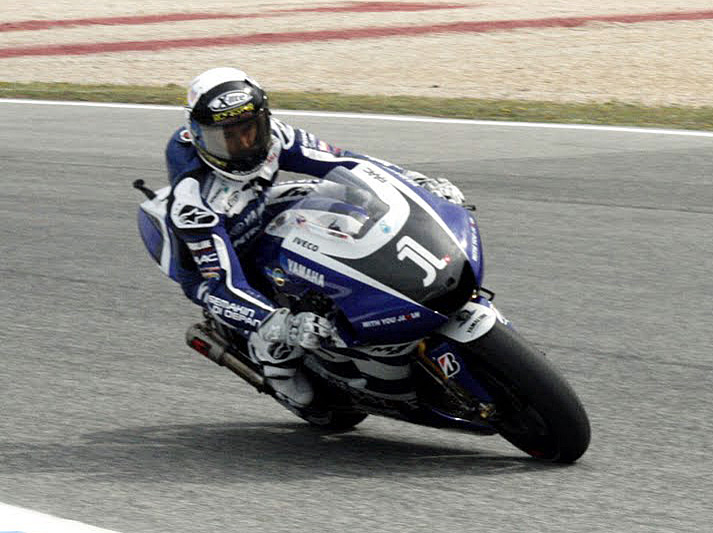
Lorenzo at the 2011 Portuguese Grand Prix

Lorenzo started the 2011 season with four podium finishes in the first five races, including a victory at the Spanish Grand Prix; he was benefitted from a collision between Casey Stoner and Valentino Rossi, with both riders coming off their bikes, and Lorenzo eventually won the race by almost twenty seconds. He held the championship lead into the British Grand Prix, where he crashed out of the race, held in wet conditions, while running third. After a sixth-place finish at Assen, Lorenzo then finished each of the next eight races in the top four placings, winning two of them, at Mugello, and Misano.

Lorenzo's season was ended by a crash during warm-up for the Australian Grand Prix at Phillip Island. Lorenzo lost the end of a finger, and underwent successful surgery in Melbourne to repair damage to it, with surgeons able to save the nerves and tendons of the injured fourth finger of his left hand. Surgery was deemed a success and as a result no functionality was lost in either the finger or the hand. Stoner won the championship at the event after winning the race, while Lorenzo maintained second place to the end of the championship, helped in part by the cancellation of the Malaysian Grand Prix after the death of Marco Simoncelli.

==== 2012 ====
Lorenzo made his race return in Qatar, qualifying on pole position before taking the race victory the following evening. After successive second places at Jerez and Estoril, Lorenzo then won the next two races at Le Mans, and Cataluña; in the process, opening up a 20-point lead over Casey Stoner in the riders' championship.

Ahead of the British Grand Prix, Lorenzo signed a new two-year contract with Yamaha, keeping him with the team until the end of the 2014 season. Lorenzo extended his championship lead to 25 points, by winning the race ahead of Stoner. After being taken out of the Dutch TT by Álvaro Bautista and a second place at the Sachsenring, Lorenzo recorded his fifth win of the season at Mugello to extend his championship lead to 19 over Dani Pedrosa. Lorenzo ultimately clinched his second title at Phillip Island by finishing second behind race winner Casey Stoner (which was also helped by Stoner's crash and ankle injury in Indianapolis which forced him out for three races).

==== 2013 ====
Lorenzo started the season as the defending World Champion, re-joining Valentino Rossi as teammate, and battled it out with Repsol Honda teammates Marc Márquez and Dani Pedrosa for the championship. He won races at Losail, Mugello, Misano, Catalunya, Silverstone, Phillip Island, Motegi and Valencia, but missed the race at the Sachsenring due to injury, and finished second in the final championship standings, with 330 points, four points behind Márquez. In this season, Marc's teammate put his wheels ahead of Jorge for eight times at Austin, Jerez, Le Mans, Assen, Laguna Seca, Indianapolis, Brno and Sepang, while Jorge's teammate for three times ahead of Marc at Losail, Assen and Phillip Island.

==== 2014 ====
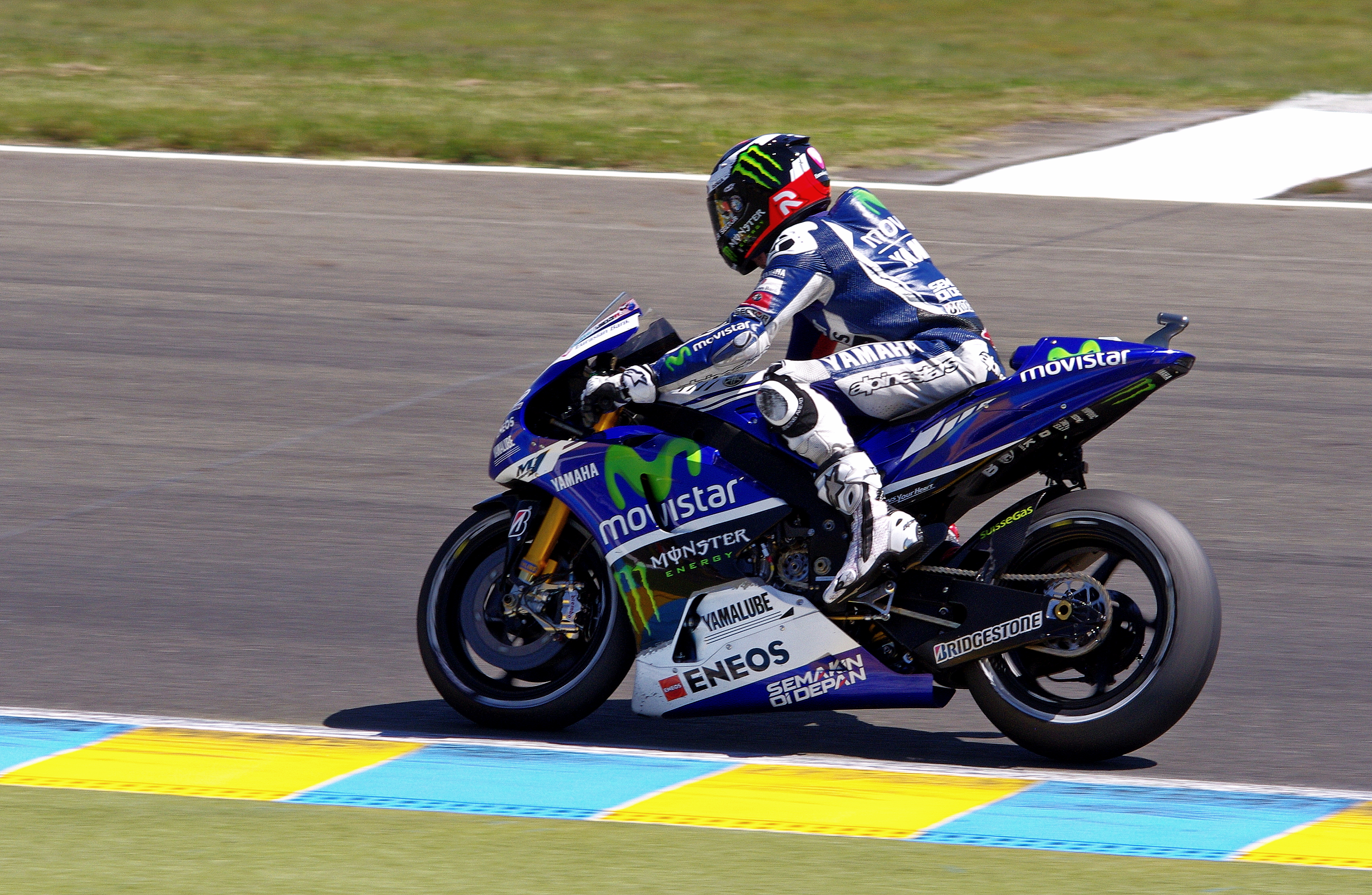
Lorenzo at the 2014 French Grand Prix

Lorenzo started the 2014 season slowly, crashing out in Qatar and a tenth-place finish in Austin, having jumped the start. He achieved his first podium of the season in Argentina, but only achieved one further podium – at Mugello, – in the next five races. At the midway point of the season, at the Sanchsenring, Lorenzo had only collected 97 points; this tally was 128 behind championship leader Marc Márquez. Starting the second half of the season, Lorenzo achieved four consecutive second-place finishes at Indianapolis, Brno, Silverstone and Misano.

Lorenzo's first victory of the season came during a wet race at Aragon, his first win at the circuit. Lorenzo followed that victory up with a victory in the next race at Motegi, having also won at the circuit in 2009 and 2013. For the majority of the season, Lorenzo was involved in a three-way rivalry with teammate Rossi and Dani Pedrosa to claim the runner-up position overall. At Valencia, Lorenzo took the decision to swap bikes – on lap 20 – as light rain fell. He struggled to get the bike stopped in the uncertain conditions and dropped down the order; he ultimately retired from the race. He finished third in the final championship standings behind Márquez and Rossi, with 263 points.

==== 2015 ====
Lorenzo started the 2015 season by taking fourth-place finishes at Losail and Austin, before adding a fifth-place finish in Argentina. Lorenzo then took four successive victories – for the first time in his career – at Jerez, Le Mans, Mugello, and Barcelona. These results moved him into second in the riders' championship standings, a point behind teammate Rossi. Lorenzo then finished third at Assen, losing ground to Rossi in the standings, after he won the race. He finished in second place at Indianapolis, before adding his fifth victory of the season at Brno. He finished fourth place at Silverstone in wet conditions, before crashing out at Misano.

Lorenzo achieved his sixth win of the season – and the sixtieth of his career – at the Aragon Grand Prix; coupled with Rossi's third place, he cut the deficit in the championship to Rossi, to 14 points. The pair's results were enough for the team to clinch their respective title, their first since 2010. In Japan, Rossi extended the championship lead to eighteen with a second-place finish to Dani Pedrosa in drying conditions. Lorenzo had started on pole but faded to third with tyre issues. In Australia, Lorenzo was passed for the lead on the final lap by Márquez; however, with Rossi down in fourth, Lorenzo cut the championship lead to eleven. Lorenzo further cut the lead to seven, after a second-place finish in Malaysia; Rossi finished third after a collision with Márquez, whom he accused of working for Lorenzo, in which he accrued three penalty points – enough to enforce a start from the back of the grid for the final race in Valencia. Rossi made it up to fourth in the race, but Lorenzo won the race and took the championship – his fifth world title overall – by five points.

==== 2016 ====
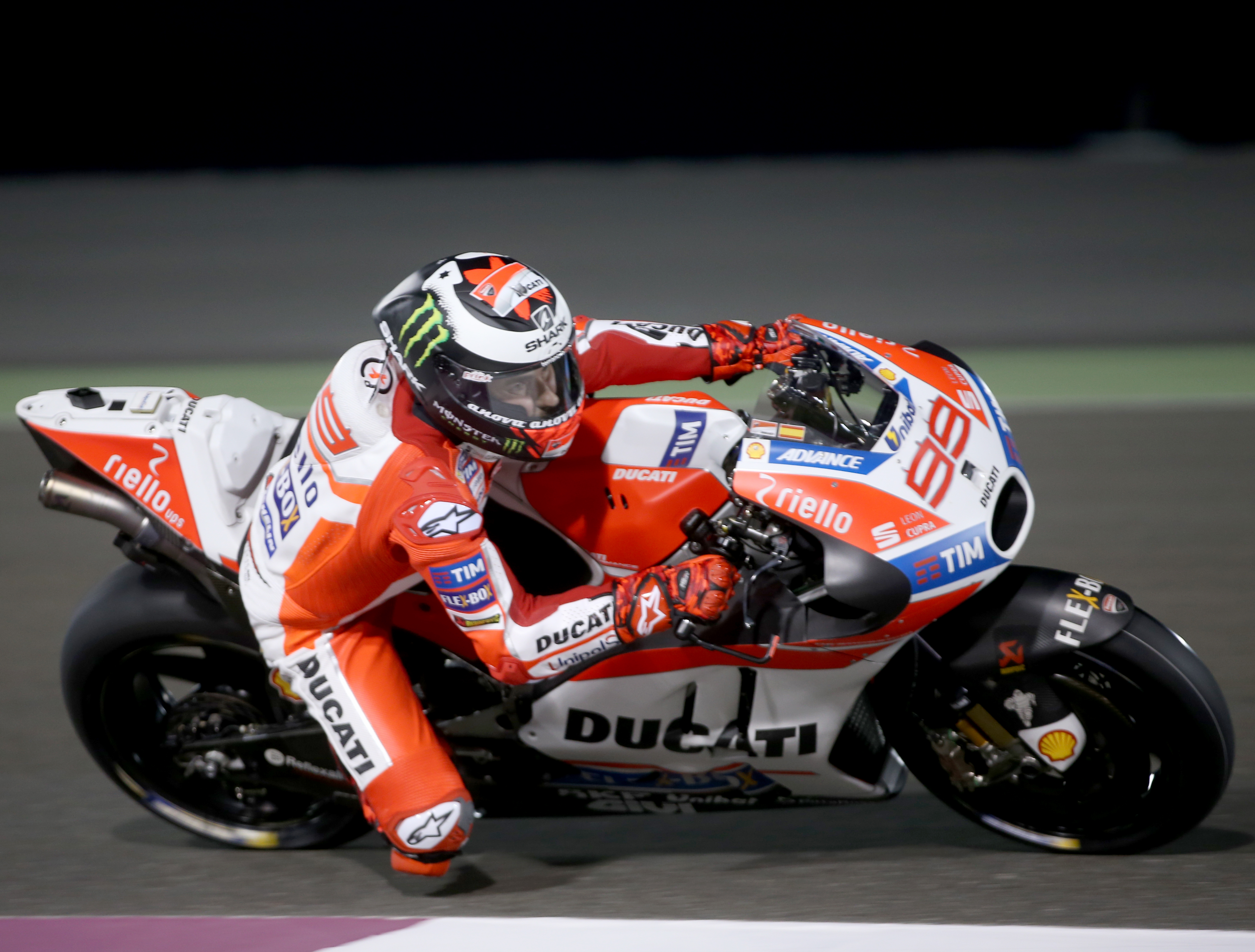
Lorenzo in 2017

Lorenzo started the 2016 season by winning from pole position in Qatar. In the coming three races, Lorenzo failed to grab a win and fell behind Marc Márquez in the title race following a crash and two runners-up finishes. Before his first runner-up finish at the Spanish Grand Prix in Jerez, Lorenzo announced that he would leave the Yamaha team to join Ducati next season. Two consecutive wins in France and Italy put him back in front of the championship only to fall back to third due to a performance dip over the following five races. At Misano, Lorenzo put in a qualifying lap record to claim his 64th career pole an all-time record. Eventually, Lorenzo would finish third at Misano and the following weekend at the Aragon Grand Prix, he would finish second. But with five laps to go at the Japanese Grand Prix, he crashed while running in second place allowing Marquez to clinch the championship. However, he wrapped up the season at Valencia not only with a qualifying lap record and his 65th career pole but with a win in his final race with Yamaha.

==== 2017 ====
In 2017 season, Lorenzo switched team from Yamaha to Ducati. With initial trouble adjusting to the new bike, Lorenzo suffered a winless season for the first time in the premier class and his first since the 2005 250cc season, although he scored three podiums and finished seventh in the overall standings.

==== 2018 ====
After yet another difficult season opening blighted by a brake failure in Qatar and a collision while fighting for a podium at Jerez, it was announced Lorenzo's contract would not be renewed for 2019. He then proceeded to win three races in quick succession, as well as scoring multiple pole positions. Lorenzo took his first Ducati victory in the Italian round at Mugello with a dominant lights-to-flag performance. This was Lorenzo's sixth win at the particular circuit and broke his longest MotoGP winless streak up until that date. Remarkably, Lorenzo followed this up with a dominant win at the Circuit de Catalunya, his first back to back wins in MotoGP since 2016.

Lorenzo's third win for the 2018 season came in Austria, taking out the Austrian Grand Prix at the Red Bull Ring in Spielberg. Lorenzo defeated Honda's Marc Marquez by 0.130 seconds.

At the next three races Lorenzo achieved three consecutive pole positions but was unable to score any points, after the British Grand Prix was cancelled due to heavy rain, finishing the San Marino Grand Prix 17th following a crash during a battle with Marquez, and crashing on the first corner of the Aragon Grand Prix. Following the latter crash which broke a bone in his foot, Lorenzo withdrew from the Japanese MotoGP and Australian Motorcycle Grand Prix at Phillip Island. This was a start of a spell of several serious injuries, which carried on into his time at Honda.

==== 2019 ====
On 6 June 2018, it was announced that Lorenzo would join Repsol Honda Team on a two-year deal, replacing retiring compatriot Dani Pedrosa. Despite tough early going in the season, finishing no higher than 11th, Lorenzo presented positive development of the Honda for his riding style coming into the mid-season. Although making rapid gains, in the Catalan GP, he took out Valentino Rossi, Maverick Viñales and Andrea Dovizioso while making a hairpin corner pass in early race traffic.

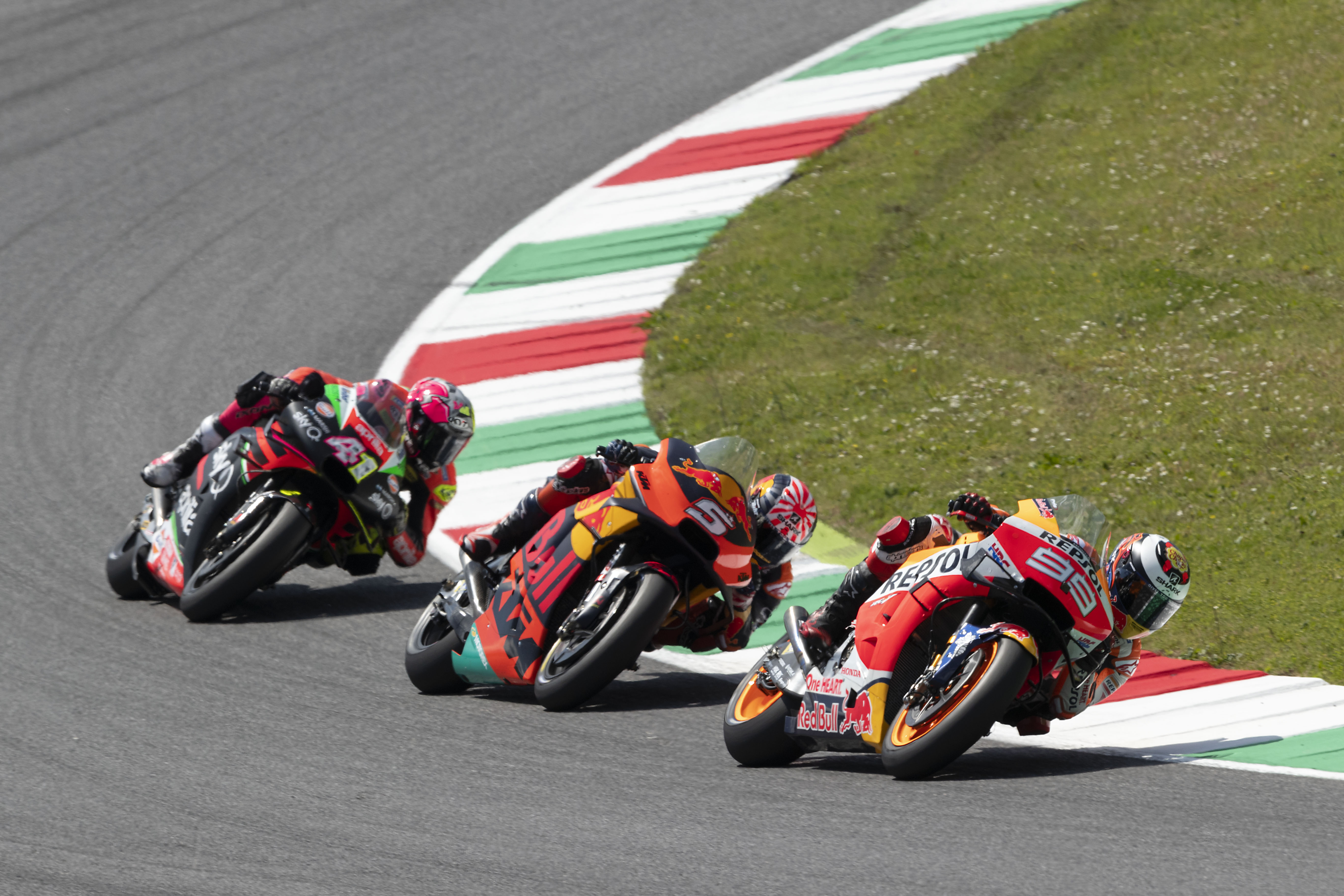
Mugello 2019

At the Assen GP, Lorenzo suffered a tumble in the gravel during the first practice session and fractured two vertebras which eliminated him from race contention. He subsequently missed the next three rounds in recovery, and upon return claimed to be riding under duress of intense pain. Years later, Jorge Lorenzo confessed in several interviews that this fall was the reason for his retirement because he was already afraid of suffering a new fall that would cause an injury that would cause a disability and he became afraid of the motorcycle.

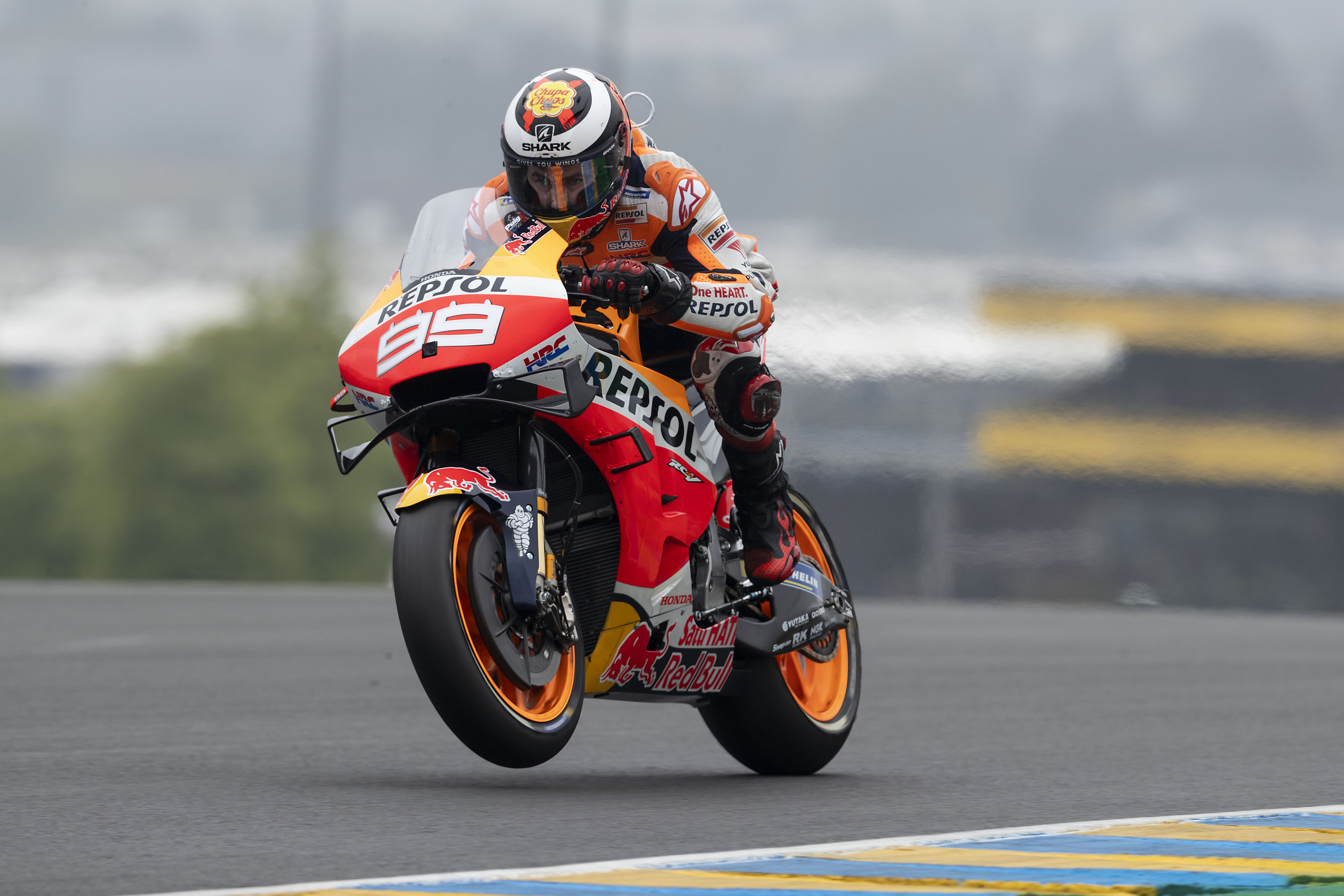
Le Mans 2019

On 14 November 2019 at a special press conference at Circuit Ricardo Tormo near Valencia, Spain during the last race of the season, Lorenzo announced his retirement from racing at the age of 32. He finished the season in 19th place the riders' championship with just 28 points, his career worst season by far. It was also his first ever season in the premier class without a single podium finish, having failed to achieve even a single top-ten finish.

==== 2020 ====
In January 2020, Lorenzo was confirmed to be contracted as lead test rider for the Yamaha Factory Racing European test team. Yamaha has a Japanese test team of Kohta Nozane and Katsuyuki Nakasuga.

In March 2020, it was announced that Lorenzo would make at least one wildcard appearance in a season disrupted by the COVID-19 pandemic. Due to wildcards being cancelled, this did not happen. Later in the year, Lorenzo revealed that he opted against making a permanent comeback within the Ducati stable for the 2021 season after serious considerations, also endorsing Francesco Bagnaia as the 'logical choice' to fill the factory seat in his place.

=== Celebrations ===
Lorenzo has become known for his celebration antics, which became more frequent over the 2010 season. Those included Lorenzo imitating a Spaceman, jumping into the lake in the infield of the Jerez circuit, and Nintendo's Mario brothers making an appearance at the trackside.

=== Rivalries ===
During his reign as 250cc champion, Lorenzo was known to be very aggressive in his riding, particularly when overtaking others. He was penalised by a suspension which stopped him from taking part in Malaysia in 2005. Lorenzo's tenure in the Fiat Yamaha team has been underscored by an intense rivalry between himself and his teammate Valentino Rossi.

In 2011, Lorenzo was seen arguing with fellow rider Marco Simoncelli, who was under fire from Lorenzo for his dangerous riding. Simoncelli retorted by reminding Lorenzo of his race suspension after he was overly aggressive while overtaking a rider in 2005, which included last lap clashing of fairings with Pedrosa and moments later taking Alex de Angelis down. Lorenzo said, "If it doesn't come from you again there will be no problem". Simoncelli put even more fuel to the fire by saying, "I will be arrested", to which a visibly angry Lorenzo reacted by saying, "This is no joke, we are playing with our lives here". Simoncelli claimed that he still had his leathers which were left blackened at the knee slider after a previous incident with Lorenzo at the final round of the 2010 season. Simoncelli died later that year after being run over after falling onto the race track in Malaysia.

== Post-motorcycle racing career ==
=== Sportscar racing ===
==== Porsche Supercup and Porsche Carrera Cup Italia ====
Lorenzo was confirmed to participate in 2022 in the Porsche Supercup as a guest driver at Imola, in addition to regularly participating in the Porsche Carrera Cup Italia, driving the No. 8 Porsche 911 for Q8 Hi Perform. Lorenzo stated he decided to participate in what was his first foray into competitive automotive racing as he "loves challenges, and this is a huge one". Driving the No. 911 Porsche "VIP" car, Lorenzo finished 30th in the Supercup race; being a guest driver he was ineligible for points. He finished 14th in the 2022 Porsche Carrera Cup Italia, with his top finish being an eighth at Vallelunga.

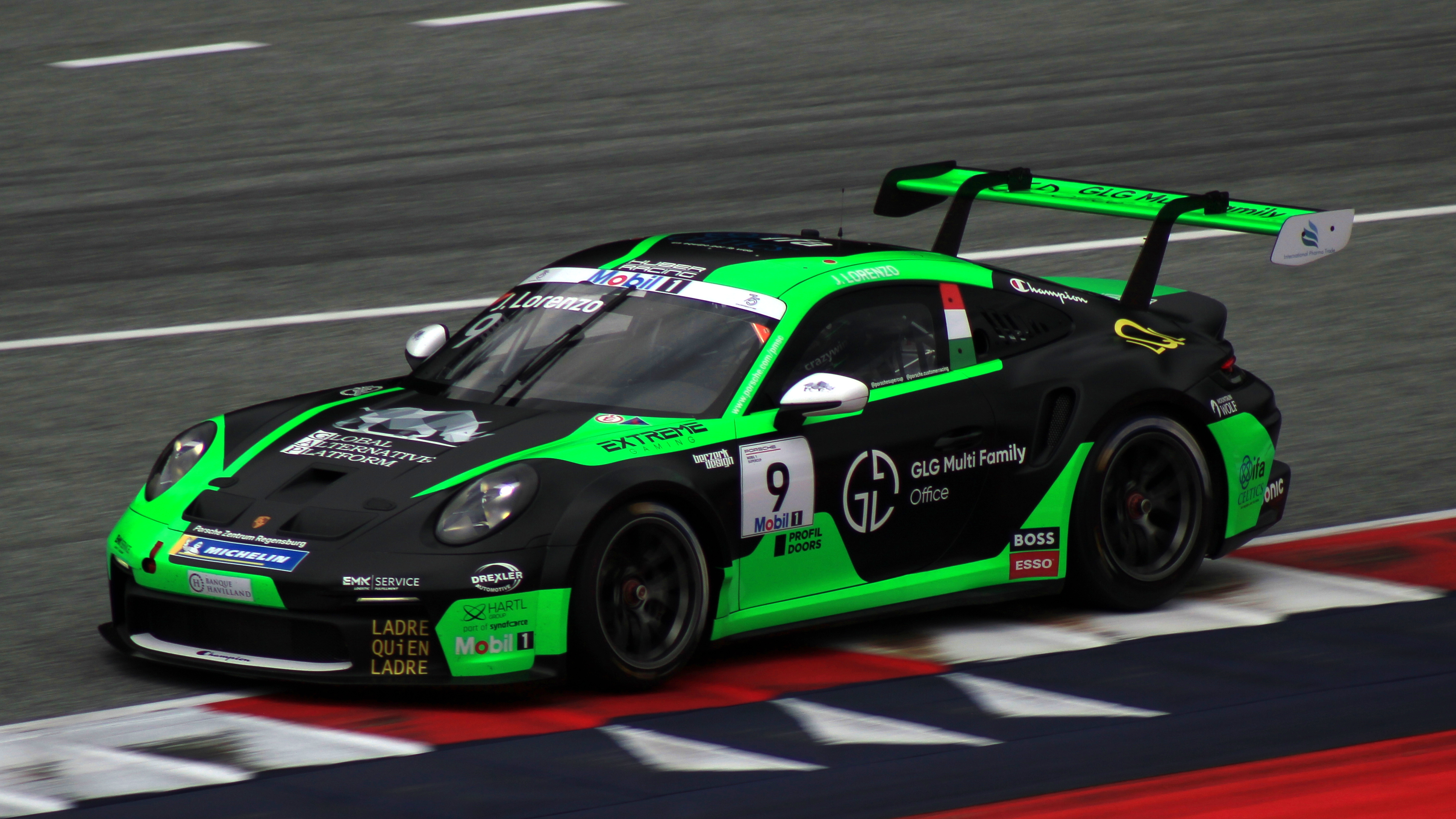
Lorenzo competing in the 2023 Porsche Supercup Spielberg round.

Lorenzo announced in February 2023 that he would be joining the 2023 Porsche Supercup as a full-time driver, driving for Huber Racing. In addition to his Porsche Supercup campaign, Lorenzo continued his campaign with Q8 Hi Perform in Porsche Carrera Cup Italia, still driving the No. 8 car. Lorenzo would not continue in either series after 2023.

==== Italian GT Championship ====
Lorenzo signed a multi-year deal with Lazarus Corse in 2024 to race an Aston Martin Vantage GT3, with an announcement made on Instagram. The series in which Lorenzo will race in was not mentioned in his announcement. ACI Sport would later publish a statement stating that Lorenzo would compete in the Endurance rounds of the Italian GT Championship, teaming up with William Alatalo and newly-inducted AMR Driver Academy driver Mahaveer Raghunathan.

Lorenzo finished his first race in the series in 14th place.

== Isle of Man TT ==
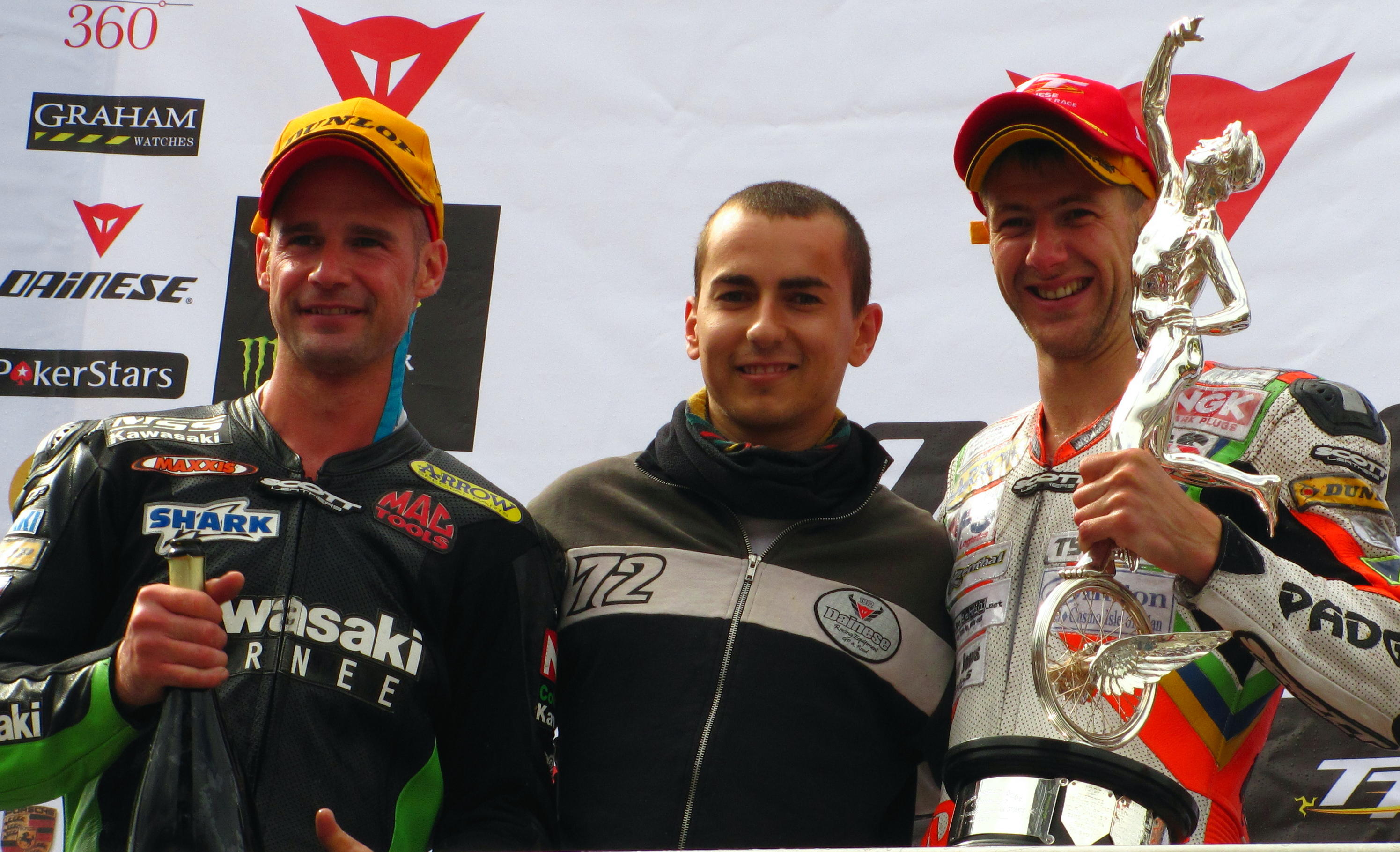
Lorenzo joins second-place Ryan Farquhar and 2010 Senior TT winner Ian Hutchinson on the podium, following Hutchinson's historic fifth victory at the 2010 Isle of Man TT.

During a break between the Italian and British rounds of the 2010 Championship, Lorenzo rode a Yamaha in a parade lap around the world-famous Snaefell Mountain Course at the Isle of Man TT. He rode alongside former World Champion Ángel Nieto, later describing the experience as 'amazing'.

At the conclusion of the Senior TT, Lorenzo then took part of the garlanding ceremony, in which he bestowed garlands on third placed Bruce Anstey, second placed Ryan Farquhar and winner Ian Hutchinson, rounding off Hutchinson's historical five race wins at the 2010 TT meeting.

== Personal life ==
Lorenzo was born in Palma, Balearic Islands, Spain. In January 2010, Lorenzo got involved with the Oxfam international confederation's efforts in assisting support for the victims of the 2010 Haiti earthquake.

The character Jorge in the video game Halo: Reach is named for him, after Lorenzo wore a helmet at the 2009 Valencian Grand Prix that replicated a style of helmet from Halo 3: ODST. Lorenzo wore sponsored helmets from the Call of Duty franchise, at the Valencian Grand Prix in 2013 for Ghosts and Advanced Warfare in 2014.

Lorenzo wore sponsored protective gear from Dainese between 2005 and 2010, and Alpinestars from 2011 onwards. On 17 October 2013, Lorenzo visited the Petersen Automotive Museum in Los Angeles, to celebrate the 50th Anniversary of Alpinestars.

On 2 May 2013, three days before the Spanish Grand Prix, the Circuito de Jerez renamed the thirteenth corner "Curva Lorenzo". It had previously been known as "Curva Ducados".

In September 2015, China-based Zopo Mobile released the Zopo Speed 7 GP smartphone, endorsed by Lorenzo.

In 2020, Lorenzo competed in the Spanish celebrity song contest Mask Singer: Adivina quién canta, finishing fourth.

Lorenzo was appointed as the brand ambassador for Super Soco in 2021. A special edition Lorenzo-inspired 'JL99' scooter was unveiled by Lorenzo at the Milan Motorcycle Show in November 2021.

In 2022, Lorenzo was hired by DAZN to work as a race-commentator for MotoGP broadcasts in Spain.

== Career statistics ==
=== Grand Prix motorcycle racing ===
==== By season ====
Season	Class	Motorcycle	Team	Race	Win	Podium	Pole	FLap	Pts	Plcd	WCh
2002	125cc	Derbi RS 125	Caja Madrid Derbi Racing	14	0	0	0	0	21	21st	–
2003	125cc	Derbi RS 125	Caja Madrid Derbi Racing	16	1	2	1	1	79	12th	–
2004	125cc	Derbi RSA 125	Caja Madrid Derbi Racing	16	3	7	2	2	179	4th	–
2005	250cc	Honda RS250RW	Fortuna Honda	15	0	6	4	0	167	5th	–
2006	250cc	Aprilia RSW 250	Fortuna Aprilia	16	8	11	10	1	289	**1st**	1
2007	250cc	Aprilia RSW 250	Fortuna Aprilia	17	9	12	9	3	312	**1st**	1
2008	MotoGP	Yamaha YZR-M1	Fiat Yamaha Team	17	1	6	4	1	190	4th	–
2009	MotoGP	Yamaha YZR-M1	Fiat Yamaha Team	17	4	12	5	4	261	**2nd**	–
2010	MotoGP	Yamaha YZR-M1	Fiat Yamaha Team	18	9	16	7	4	383	**1st**	1
2011	MotoGP	Yamaha YZR-M1	Yamaha Factory Racing	15	3	10	2	2	260	**2nd**	–
2012	MotoGP	Yamaha YZR-M1	Yamaha Factory Racing	18	6	16	7	5	350	**1st**	1
2013	MotoGP	Yamaha YZR-M1	Yamaha Factory Racing	17	8	14	4	2	330	**2nd**	–
2014	MotoGP	Yamaha YZR-M1	Movistar Yamaha MotoGP	18	2	11	1	2	263	**3rd**	–
2015	MotoGP	Yamaha YZR-M1	Movistar Yamaha MotoGP	18	7	12	5	6	330	**1st**	1
2016	MotoGP	Yamaha YZR-M1	Movistar Yamaha MotoGP	18	4	10	4	2	233	**3rd**	–
2017	MotoGP	Ducati Desmosedici GP17	Ducati Team	18	0	3	0	0	137	7th	–
2018	MotoGP	Ducati Desmosedici GP18	Ducati Team	14	3	4	4	2	134	9th	–
2019	MotoGP	Honda RC213V	Repsol Honda Team	15	0	0	0	0	28	19th	–
Total				**297**	**68**	**152**	**69**	**37**	**3946**		**5**

==== By class ====
Class	Seasons	1st GP	1st Pod	1st Win	Race	Win	Podiums	Pole	FLap	Pts	WChmp
125cc	2002–2004	2002 Spain	2003 Rio de Janeiro	2003 Rio de Janeiro	46	4	9	3	3	279	0
250cc	2005–2007	2005 Spain	2005 Italy	2006 Spain	48	17	29	23	4	768	2
MotoGP	2008–2019	2008 Qatar	2008 Qatar	2008 Portugal	203	47	114	43	30	2899	3
Total	2002–2019				**297**	**68**	**152**	**69**	**37**	**3946**	**5**

==== Races by year ====
(key) (Races in bold indicate pole position, races in italics indicate fastest lap)

Year	Class	Bike	1	2	3	4	5	6	7	8	9	10	11	12	13	14	15	16	17	18	19	Pos	Pts
2002	125cc	Derbi	JPN	RSA	SPA; 22	FRA; 19	ITA; 20	CAT; 14	NED; 16	GBR; 13	GER; 17	CZE; 20	POR; Ret	BRA; 7	PAC; 9	MAL; 20	AUS; Ret	VAL; 22				21st	21
2003	125cc	Derbi	JPN; Ret	RSA; 24	SPA; 15	FRA; Ret	ITA; Ret	CAT; 6	NED; Ret	GBR; Ret	GER; 21	CZE; 12	POR; 6	BRA; 1	PAC; Ret	**MAL**; 3	AUS; 8	VAL; 11				12th	79
2004	125cc	Derbi	RSA; 16	SPA; Ret	FRA; 3	ITA; 10	**CAT**; 5	NED; 1	BRA; Ret	GER; 6	GBR; 3	CZE; 1	POR; 3	JPN; 7	**QAT**; 1	MAL; Ret	AUS; 2	VAL; Ret				4th	179
2005	250cc	Honda	SPA; 6	POR; 10	CHN; 9	FRA; 5	**ITA**; 2	CAT; Ret	**NED**; 3	GBR; 8	GER; Ret	**CZE**; 2	JPN; Ret	MAL	**QAT**; 2	AUS; 3	TUR; 4	VAL; 2				5th	167
2006	250cc	Aprilia	**SPA**; 1	**QAT**; 1	**TUR**; Ret	CHN; 4	FRA; Ret	**ITA**; 1	CAT; 2	**NED**; 1	**GBR**; 1	**GER**; 3	**CZE**; 1	MAL; 1	**AUS**; 1	**JPN**; 3	POR; 5	VAL; 4				**1st**	**289**
2007	250cc	Aprilia	**QAT**; 1	**SPA**; 1	TUR; 2	**CHN**; 1	**FRA**; 1	ITA; 8	**CAT**; 1	GBR; Ret	**NED**; 1	GER; 4	**CZE**; 1	**RSM**; 1	POR; 3	JPN; 11	**AUS**; 1	MAL; 3	VAL; 7			**1st**	**312**
2008	MotoGP	Yamaha	**QAT**; 2	**SPA**; 3	**POR**; 1	CHN; 4	FRA; 2	ITA; Ret	CAT; WD	GBR; 6	NED; 6	GER; Ret	USA; Ret	CZE; 10	RSM; 2	INP; 3	**JPN**; 4	AUS; 4	MAL; Ret	VAL; 8		4th	190
2009	MotoGP	Yamaha	QAT; 3	JPN; 1	**SPA**; Ret	FRA; 1	**ITA**; 2	**CAT**; 2	NED; 2	**USA**; 3	GER; 2	GBR; Ret	CZE; Ret	INP; 1	RSM; 2	**POR**; 1	AUS; Ret	MAL; 4	VAL; 3			**2nd**	**261**
2010	MotoGP	Yamaha	QAT; 2	SPA; 1	FRA; 1	ITA; 2	**GBR**; 1	**NED**; 1	**CAT**; 1	**GER**; 2	**USA**; 1	CZE; 1	INP; 3	RSM; 2	ARA; 4	JPN; 4	**MAL**; 3	AUS; 2	**POR**; 1	VAL; 1		**1st**	**383**
2011	MotoGP	Yamaha	QAT; 2	SPA; 1	**POR**; 2	FRA; 4	CAT; 2	GBR; Ret	NED; 6	ITA; 1	GER; 2	**USA**; 2	CZE; 4	INP; 4	RSM; 1	ARA; 3	JPN; 2	AUS; DNS	MAL	VAL		**2nd**	**260**
2012	MotoGP	Yamaha	**QAT**; 1	**SPA**; 2	POR; 2	FRA; 1	CAT; 1	GBR; 1	NED; Ret	GER; 2	ITA; 1	**USA**; 2	INP; 2	**CZE**; 2	RSM; 1	**ARA**; 2	**JPN**; 2	**MAL**; 2	AUS; 2	VAL; Ret		**1st**	**350**
2013	MotoGP	Yamaha	**QAT**; 1	AME; 3	**SPA**; 3	FRA; 7	ITA; 1	CAT; 1	NED; 5	GER; DNS	USA; 6	INP; 3	CZE; 3	GBR; 1	RSM; 1	ARA; 2	MAL; 3	**AUS**; 1	**JPN**; 1	VAL; 1		**2nd**	**330**
2014	MotoGP	Yamaha	QAT; Ret	AME; 10	ARG; 3	SPA; 4	FRA; 6	ITA; 2	CAT; 4	NED; 13	GER; 3	INP; 2	CZE; 2	GBR; 2	**RSM**; 2	ARA; 1	JPN; 1	AUS; 2	MAL; 3	VAL; Ret		**3rd**	**263**
2015	MotoGP	Yamaha	QAT; 4	AME; 4	ARG; 5	**SPA**; 1	FRA; 1	ITA; 1	CAT; 1	NED; 3	GER; 4	INP; 2	**CZE**; 1	GBR; 4	**RSM**; Ret	ARA; 1	**JPN**; 3	AUS; 2	MAL; 2	**VAL**; 1		**1st**	**330**
2016	MotoGP	Yamaha	**QAT**; 1	ARG; Ret	AME; 2	SPA; 2	**FRA**; 1	ITA; 1	CAT; Ret	NED; 10	GER; 15	AUT; 3	CZE; 17	GBR; 8	**RSM**; 3	ARA; 2	JPN; Ret	AUS; 6	MAL; 3	**VAL**; 1		**3rd**	**233**
2017	MotoGP	Ducati	QAT; 11	ARG; Ret	AME; 9	SPA; 3	FRA; 6	ITA; 8	CAT; 4	NED; 15	GER; 11	CZE; 15	AUT; 4	GBR; 5	RSM; Ret	ARA; 3	JPN; 6	AUS; 15	MAL; 2	VAL; Ret		7th	137
2018	MotoGP	Ducati	QAT; Ret	ARG; 15	AME; 11	SPA; Ret	FRA; 6	ITA; 1	**CAT**; 1	NED; 7	GER; 6	CZE; 2	AUT; 1	**GBR**; C	**RSM**; 17	**ARA**; Ret	THA; DNS	JPN; DNS	AUS	MAL; WD	VAL; 12	9th	134
2019	MotoGP	Honda	QAT; 13	ARG; 12	AME; Ret	SPA; 12	FRA; 11	ITA; 13	CAT; Ret	NED; DNS	GER	CZE	AUT	GBR; 14	RSM; 14	ARA; 20	THA; 18	JPN; 17	AUS; 16	MAL; 14	VAL; 13	19th	28

== Car racing records ==
=== Career summary ===
Season	Series	Team	Races	Wins	Poles	F/laps	Podiums	Points	Position
2022	Porsche Carrera Cup Italia	Team Q8 Hi-Perform	11	0	0	0	0	30	13th
2022	Porsche Supercup	Porsche Motorsport	1	0	0	0	0	0	NC†
2023	Porsche Carrera Cup Italia	Team Q8 Hi-Perform	10	0	0	0	0	27	21st
2023	Porsche Supercup	Team Huber Racing	7	0	0	0	0	3	24th
2024	Italian GT Endurance Championship – GT3 Pro	Lazarus Corse	3	0	0	0	0	0	20th

^{†} Guest driver ineligible to score points.
^{*} Season still in progress.

=== Complete Porsche Carrera Cup Italia results ===
(key) (Races in bold indicate pole position) (Races in italics indicate fastest lap)

Year	Team	1	2	3	4	5	6	7	8	9	10	11	12	Pos.	Points
2022	Team Q8 Hi-Perform	IMO1; 19	IMO2	MIS1; 14	MIS2; 17	MUG1; 16	MUG2; 11	VAL1; 10	VAL1; 8	MON1; 22	MON2; 30	MUG1; 9	MUG2; Ret	13th	30
2023	Team Q8 Hi-Perform	MIS1; 19	MIS2; 8	VAL1; Ret	VAL2	MUG1; 10	MUG2; 10	MON1; Ret	MON2; 8	MIS1; 17	MIS2; 29	IMO1; Ret	IMO2	21st	27

=== Complete Porsche Supercup results ===
(key) (Races in bold indicate pole position) (Races in italics indicate fastest lap)

Year	Team	1	2	3	4	5	6	7	8	Pos.	Points
2022	Porsche Motorsport	IMO; 30	MON	SIL	RBR	LEC	SPA	ZND	MNZ	NC‡	0‡
2023	Team Huber Racing	MON; Ret	RBR; 15	SIL	HUN; Ret	SPA; 23	ZND; 16	ZND; 21	MNZ; 24†	24th	3

^{‡} As Lorenzo was a guest driver, he was ineligible for points.
^{†} Driver did not finish the race, but was classified as he completed over 90% of the race distance.

=== Complete Italian GT Championship results ===
==== Italian GT Endurance Championship ====
(key) (Races in bold indicate pole position) (Races in italics indicate fastest lap)

Year	Team	Co-Drivers	Car	Class	1	2	3	4	Pos.	Points
2024	Lazarus Corse	(Finland) William Alatalo (India) Mahaveer Raghunathan (Rd.1–2) (Italy) Mattia di Giusto (Rd.3)	Aston Martin Vantage AMR GT3 Evo	Pro	VAL; 14	MUG; 11	IMO; Ret	MON	20th	0
