= Super Soco =

Chinese electric motorcycle manufacturer

- Type: Private limited
- Industry: Motor vehicle manufacturing; Motor vehicle distribution; Charging solutions
- Founded: 2015; 11 years ago in Shanghai, China
- Founder: Sherman Xie
- Headquarters: Shanghai, China
- Products: TS, TC, TC Max, CUX, CPX
- Website: supersoco.com

Super Soco is an electric motorcycle brand, created by the Super Soco Intelligent Technology group that was founded in Shanghai in 2015. The brand is promoted internationally by the Vmoto Soco automotive group. The Super Soco Intelligent Technology group, a separate entity, is based in China, and manages the distribution of Super Soco products within China.

During the late 2010s and early 2020s, Super Soco was one of the first electric motorcycle brands to attain mainstream appeal, with the only competitor at the time possessing a comparable global footprint being Niu Technologies.

The founder of the group and the current CEO is Sherman Xie.

The Super Soco line of motorcycles includes the Super Soco TC and TC Max motorcycles as well as the Super Soco CUX and CPX scooters.

== History ==
Super Soco was founded in 2015 by Sherman Xie, and their first motorcycle, the Super Soco TS, was released the following year. The company unveiled their first scooter, the CU, in April 2018.

In 2017, Super Soco shifted their manufacturing operations from Wuxi, China, to Nanjing, leasing a section of a factory that was owned by the Australian company Vmoto. In February 2020, Super Soco entered into a joint venture with Vmoto, formalising the strategic relationship between the two companies that had been in place since 2017.

Super Soco attracted the attention of Italian motorcycle manufacturer Ducati in 2019, and the branding of the company subsequently featured on a special edition Ducati-styled electric scooter.

In June 2021, Super Soco and the Taiwan-based motorcycle giant Kymco signed a strategic cooperation agreement, aimed at developing motorcycles and scooters that could be adapted to Kymco's Ionex battery swapping system.

In November 2021, the company moved into a purpose-constructed office that was to serve as the new headquarters of the group, located in the Qingpu District of Shanghai.

== International markets ==
The Super Soco range of motorcycles were sold in China and across a range of international markets, however the brand gained most traction in European markets.

In the United Kingdom the Super Soco CPX was the most popular electric scooter in 2021, with the Super Soco brand accounting for roughly one-third of electric powered two-wheeler registrations that year.

In France in 2020, Super Soco overtook Niu to become the most popular electric motorcycle brand overall that year, largely on the back of the popularity of the Super Soco TC model.

The Spanish MotoGP former champion Jorge Lorenzo was appointed as a brand ambassador in 2020.

In September 2021, Super Soco launched the Super Soco TC Max electric motorcycle.

In December 2022, Super Soco products, CPx and New TSx were launched in India by FortunEV, the group company of Future Motor Corporation of the Vmoto brand.

== Carbon emissions ==
An investigation into motorcycle CO_{2} emissions by the UK moto website Visordown determined that the electric models of Super Soco produced 7.5 grams of CO_{2} per kilometre, compared to 49 grams per kilometre for the conventional Honda PCX scooter.

== Competition ==
The Super Soco range of motorcycles competes with a wide range of regional electric two-wheeler brands within Europe, such as Silence of Spain, the French brand Red Electric, and Askoll of Italy.

At the end of 2021, the Shanghai-based company released a statement asserting their intellectual property rights and vehicle appearance patents over the Super Soco brand.
