= Colombres (Argentina) =

Coordinates: 26°54′S 65°06′W

Colombres (Tucumán)
- Interactive map of Colombres (Tucumán)
- Country: Argentina
- Province: Tucumán Province
- Time zone: UTC−3 (ART)

Colombres (Tucumán) is a settlement in Tucumán Province in northern Argentina.
