= Virrey del Pino =

City in Buenos Aires Province, Argentina

- City
- Location in Greater Buenos Aires
- Coordinates: 34°50′41″S 58°39′6″W
- Country: Argentina
- Province: Buenos Aires
- Partido: La Matanza
- Named for: Joaquín del Pino

Area
  - Total: 117 km^{2} (45 sq mi)

Population (2010 census [INDEC])
  - Total: 156,132
  - Density: 1,330/km^{2} (3,460/sq mi)
- CPA Base: B 1763
- Area code: +54 11

Virrey del Pino is a city in La Matanza Partido, in the Buenos Aires Province of Argentina.

With a total of 117 km², it is the most extensive city in the La Matanza Partido. It is crossed by the RN 3 between kilometers 34 and 48. In this town, there is a Mercedes-Benz plant, in which the Sprinter and Vito utilities are produced, the chassis OF 1621, OH 1621 & 1721 and the Atron 1720 truck. Also in this town, there is the main plant of soft drinks Manaos (drink) and the radio station of Radio Continental.

== History ==
The city's name means "Viceroy del Pino" and refers to Joaquín del Pino, who was viceroy of the Río de la Plata from 1801 to 1804. There are no historical documents explaining why the city received this name. Historians suggest that since one of the many sons and daughters of the viceroy visited one of the local ranches, the locals decided that it belonged to the viceroy himself, and then the name spread to the whole area.

== Neighborhoods ==
- Puente Ezcurra
- Nicole
- El Triunfo
- Areco
- Oro Verde
- San Ignacio
- San Javier
- Jauretche (Golf)
- Los Aromos (Yaguané)
- Santa Amelia (Barrio cerrado)
- Parque San Martín
- El Pino
- Sapito
- Néstor Kirchner
- Mercedes Benz
- La Merced
- San Mariano
- Padre Múgica
- San Nicolás
- Arlt
- Sarmiento
- Las Perdices (Barrio cerrado)
- Cruz del Sur
- La Recoleta
- Vernazza
- Las Violetas
- El Tizón
- Sofía Bozán
- Parque Leloir de Quiroga
- Esperanza
- La Foresta
- San Pedro
- El Progreso
- El Fortín
- Kusch
- La Elvira
- El Sol
- Los Álamos
- Oro verde
