= 2010 Catalan motorcycle Grand Prix =

7th round of the 2010 FIM Road Racing World Championship season

(Catalonia) 2010 Catalan Grand Prix
Race details
- Race 7 of 18 races in the 2010 Grand Prix motorcycle racing season
- Date: 4 July 2010
- Official name: Gran Premi Aperol de Catalunya
- Location: Circuit de Catalunya
- Course: Permanent racing facility; 4.727 km (2.937 mi)

MotoGP
Pole position
- Rider: (Spain) Jorge Lorenzo
- Time: 1:42.046
Fastest lap
- Rider: (Italy) Andrea Dovizioso
- Time: 1:43.154
Podium
- First: (Spain) Jorge Lorenzo
- Second: (Spain) Dani Pedrosa
- Third: (Australia) Casey Stoner

Moto2
Pole position
- Rider: (Italy) Andrea Iannone
- Time: 1:47.493
Fastest lap
- Rider: (Italy) Andrea Iannone
- Time: 1:47.543
Podium
- First: (Japan) Yuki Takahashi
- Second: (Switzerland) Thomas Lüthi
- Third: (Spain) Julián Simón

125cc
Pole position
- Rider: (Spain) Marc Márquez
- Time: 1:50.543
Fastest lap
- Rider: (Spain) Pol Espargaró
- Time: 1:50.590
Podium
- First: (Spain) Marc Márquez
- Second: (United Kingdom) Bradley Smith
- Third: (Spain) Pol Espargaró

The 2010 Catalan motorcycle Grand Prix was the seventh round of the 2010 Grand Prix motorcycle racing season. It took place on the weekend of 2–4 July 2010 at the Circuit de Catalunya.

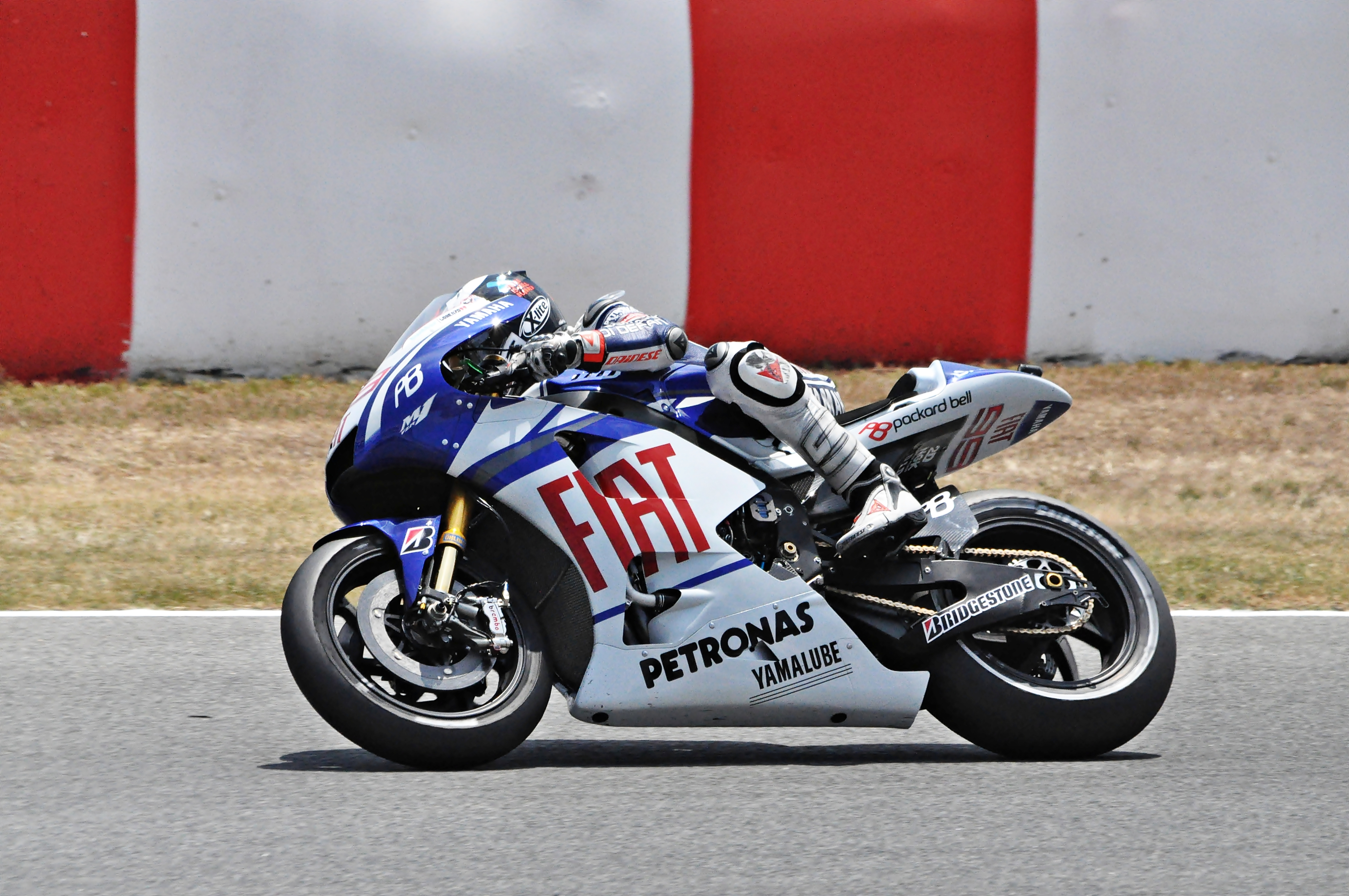
Jorge Lorenzo, riding his Yamaha at the MotoGP race, which he went on to win.

== MotoGP classification ==
Pos.	No.	Rider	Team	Manufacturer	Laps	Time/Retired	Grid	Points
1	99	(Spain) Jorge Lorenzo	Fiat Yamaha Team	Yamaha	25	43:22.805	1	25
2	26	(Spain) Dani Pedrosa	Repsol Honda Team	Honda	25	+4.754	4	20
3	27	(Australia) Casey Stoner	Ducati Team	Ducati	25	+4.956	2	16
4	14	(France) Randy de Puniet	LCR Honda MotoGP	Honda	25	+18.057	3	13
5	19	(Spain) Álvaro Bautista	Rizla Suzuki MotoGP	Suzuki	25	+21.361	9	11
6	11	(United States) Ben Spies	Monster Yamaha Tech 3	Yamaha	25	+21.503	5	10
7	65	(Italy) Loris Capirossi	Rizla Suzuki MotoGP	Suzuki	25	+24.181	7	9
8	69	(United States) Nicky Hayden	Ducati Team	Ducati	25	+27.941	11	8
9	33	(Italy) Marco Melandri	San Carlo Honda Gresini	Honda	25	+28.046	14	7
10	40	(Spain) Héctor Barberá	Páginas Amarillas Aspar	Ducati	25	+32.439	13	6
11	5	(United States) Colin Edwards	Monster Yamaha Tech 3	Yamaha	25	+38.406	10	5
12	36	(Finland) Mika Kallio	Pramac Racing Team	Ducati	25	+58.257	15	4
13	64	(Japan) Kousuke Akiyoshi	Interwetten Honda MotoGP	Honda	25	+1:09.348	16	3
14	4	(Italy) Andrea Dovizioso	Repsol Honda Team	Honda	25	+1:32.402	6	2
15	8	(Japan) Wataru Yoshikawa	Fiat Yamaha Team	Yamaha	25	+1:35.237	17	1
Ret	58	(Italy) Marco Simoncelli	San Carlo Honda Gresini	Honda	13	Accident	8	
Ret	41	(Spain) Aleix Espargaró	Pramac Racing Team	Ducati	5	Accident	12	

== Moto2 classification ==
Pos.	No.	Rider	Manufacturer	Laps	Time/Retired	Grid	Points
1	72	(Japan) Yuki Takahashi	Tech 3	23	41:42.451	2	25
2	12	(Switzerland) Thomas Lüthi	Moriwaki	23	+5.037	3	20
3	60	(Spain) Julián Simón	Suter	23	+5.200	11	16
4	17	(Czech Republic) Karel Abraham	FTR	23	+6.706	12	13
5	24	(Spain) Toni Elías	Moriwaki	23	+7.369	4	11
6	3	(Italy) Simone Corsi	Motobi	23	+7.414	13	10
7	9	(United States) Kenny Noyes	Promoharris	23	+17.010	9	9
8	10	(Spain) Fonsi Nieto	Moriwaki	23	+20.555	17	8
9	8	(Australia) Anthony West	MZ-RE Honda	23	+21.001	29	7
10	15	(San Marino) Alex de Angelis	Force GP210	23	+21.369	30	6
11	2	(Hungary) Gábor Talmácsi	Speed Up	23	+22.213	32	5
12	68	(Colombia) Yonny Hernández	BQR-Moto2	23	+23.024	23	4
13	29	(Italy) Andrea Iannone	Speed Up	23	+25.297	1	3
14	16	(France) Jules Cluzel	Suter	23	+26.674	5	2
15	11	(Japan) Yusuke Teshima	Motobi	23	+26.796	36	1
16	35	(Italy) Raffaele De Rosa	Tech 3	23	+27.441	22	
17	41	(Germany) Arne Tode	Suter	23	+27.674	19	
18	61	(Ukraine) Vladimir Ivanov	Moriwaki	23	+35.193	31	
19	18	(Spain) Jordi Torres	Promoharris	23	+37.424	25	
20	53	(France) Valentin Debise	ADV	23	+41.504	39	
21	5	(Spain) Joan Olivé	Promoharris	23	+41.710	38	
22	71	(Italy) Claudio Corti	Suter	23	+41.966	37	
23	4	(Spain) Ricard Cardús	Suter	23	+49.224	27	
24	19	(Belgium) Xavier Siméon	Moriwaki	23	+1:03.470	34	
25	40	(Spain) Sergio Gadea	Pons Kalex	23	+1:12.814	18	
26	95	(Qatar) Mashel Al Naimi	BQR-Moto2	23	+1:22.796	40	
Ret	31	(Spain) Carmelo Morales	Pons Kalex	22	Collision	6	
Ret	76	(Spain) Bernat Martínez	Bimota	20	Retirement	35	
Ret	25	(Italy) Alex Baldolini	I.C.P.	19	Retirement	26	
Ret	45	(United Kingdom) Scott Redding	Suter	12	Retirement	14	
Ret	14	(Thailand) Ratthapark Wilairot	Bimota	9	Accident	8	
Ret	7	(Spain) Dani Rivas	Promoharris	4	Accident	28	
Ret	48	(Japan) Shoya Tomizawa	Suter	4	Mechanical	7	
Ret	59	(Italy) Niccolò Canepa	Force GP210	3	Accident	33	
Ret	52	(Czech Republic) Lukáš Pešek	Moriwaki	3	Retirement	24	
Ret	21	(Russia) Vladimir Leonov	Suter	1	Accident	41	
Ret	77	(Switzerland) Dominique Aegerter	Suter	1	Collision	16	
Ret	55	(Spain) Héctor Faubel	Suter	1	Collision	15	
Ret	39	(Venezuela) Robertino Pietri	Suter	0	Collision	42	
Ret	44	(Italy) Roberto Rolfo	Suter	0	Collision	10	
Ret	6	(Spain) Alex Debón	FTR	0	Collision	20	
Ret	63	(France) Mike Di Meglio	Suter	0	Collision	21	
OFFICIAL MOTO2 REPORT

== 125 cc classification ==
Pos.	No.	Rider	Bike	Laps	Time/Retired	Grid	Points
1	93	(Spain) Marc Márquez	Derbi	22	40:46.315	1	25
2	38	(United Kingdom) Bradley Smith	Aprilia	22	+4.638	3	20
3	44	(Spain) Pol Espargaró	Derbi	22	+4.996	2	16
4	11	(Germany) Sandro Cortese	Derbi	22	+45.366	5	13
5	7	(Spain) Efrén Vázquez	Derbi	22	+45.433	8	11
6	71	(Japan) Tomoyoshi Koyama	Aprilia	22	+49.685	6	10
7	35	(Switzerland) Randy Krummenacher	Aprilia	22	+49.735	14	9
8	14	(France) Johann Zarco	Aprilia	22	+49.743	10	8
9	94	(Germany) Jonas Folger	Aprilia	22	+49.775	12	7
10	99	(United Kingdom) Danny Webb	Aprilia	22	+53.115	16	6
11	26	(Spain) Adrián Martín	Aprilia	22	+58.669	19	5
12	15	(Italy) Simone Grotzkyj	Aprilia	22	+58.800	11	4
13	23	(Spain) Alberto Moncayo	Aprilia	22	+1:02.050	13	3
14	78	(Germany) Marcel Schrötter	Honda	22	+1:15.497	23	2
15	63	(Malaysia) Zulfahmi Khairuddin	Aprilia	22	+1:16.029	18	1
16	84	(Czech Republic) Jakub Kornfeil	Aprilia	22	+1:26.441	28	
17	69	(France) Louis Rossi	Aprilia	22	+1:33.613	24	
18	87	(Italy) Luca Marconi	Aprilia	22	+1:36.186	25	
19	58	(Spain) Joan Perelló	Honda	22	+1:36.223	26	
20	60	(Netherlands) Michael van der Mark	Lambretta	22	+1:36.340	27	
21	59	(Spain) Johnny Rosell	Honda	22	+1:43.804	22	
22	72	(Italy) Marco Ravaioli	Lambretta	22	+1:55.331	30	
23	56	(Hungary) Péter Sebestyén	Aprilia	21	+1 lap	32	
Ret	40	(Spain) Nicolás Terol	Aprilia	21	Accident	4	
Ret	39	(Spain) Luis Salom	Aprilia	14	Retirement	15	
Ret	17	(Spain) Eduard López	Aprilia	11	Retirement	31	
Ret	55	(Spain) Isaac Viñales	Aprilia	10	Accident	21	
Ret	50	(Norway) Sturla Fagerhaug	Aprilia	7	Accident	17	
Ret	5	(France) Alexis Masbou	Aprilia	5	Accident	9	
Ret	12	(Spain) Esteve Rabat	Aprilia	0	Accident	7	
Ret	53	(Netherlands) Jasper Iwema	Aprilia	0	Accident	20	
DNS	32	(Italy) Lorenzo Savadori	Aprilia	0	Did not start	29	
OFFICIAL 125CC REPORT

== Championship standings after the race (MotoGP) ==
Below are the standings for the top five riders and constructors after round seven has concluded.

Riders' Championship standings

Pos.	Rider	Points
1	(Spain) Jorge Lorenzo	165
2	(Spain) Dani Pedrosa	113
3	(Italy) Andrea Dovizioso	91
4	(United States) Nicky Hayden	69
5	(France) Randy de Puniet	69

Constructors' Championship standings

Pos.	Constructor	Points
1	(Japan) Yamaha	170
2	(Japan) Honda	137
3	(Italy) Ducati	97
4	(Japan) Suzuki	37

- Note: Only the top five positions are included for both sets of standings.

Previous race: 2010 Dutch TT	FIM Grand Prix World Championship; 2010 season	Next race: 2010 German Grand Prix
Previous race: 2009 Catalan Grand Prix	Catalan motorcycle Grand Prix	Next race: 2011 Catalan Grand Prix
