= JiR Team Scot =

JiR Team Scot was a motorcycle racing team that competed in the 2008 MotoGP season. It was formed as a collaborative effort between JiR and Team Scot

- For the team that competed in MotoGP from 2005 to 2007 under the Konica Minolta name see JiR
- For the team competing in the 2009 MotoGP season see Team Scot
