= Mike Di Meglio =

French motorcycle racer

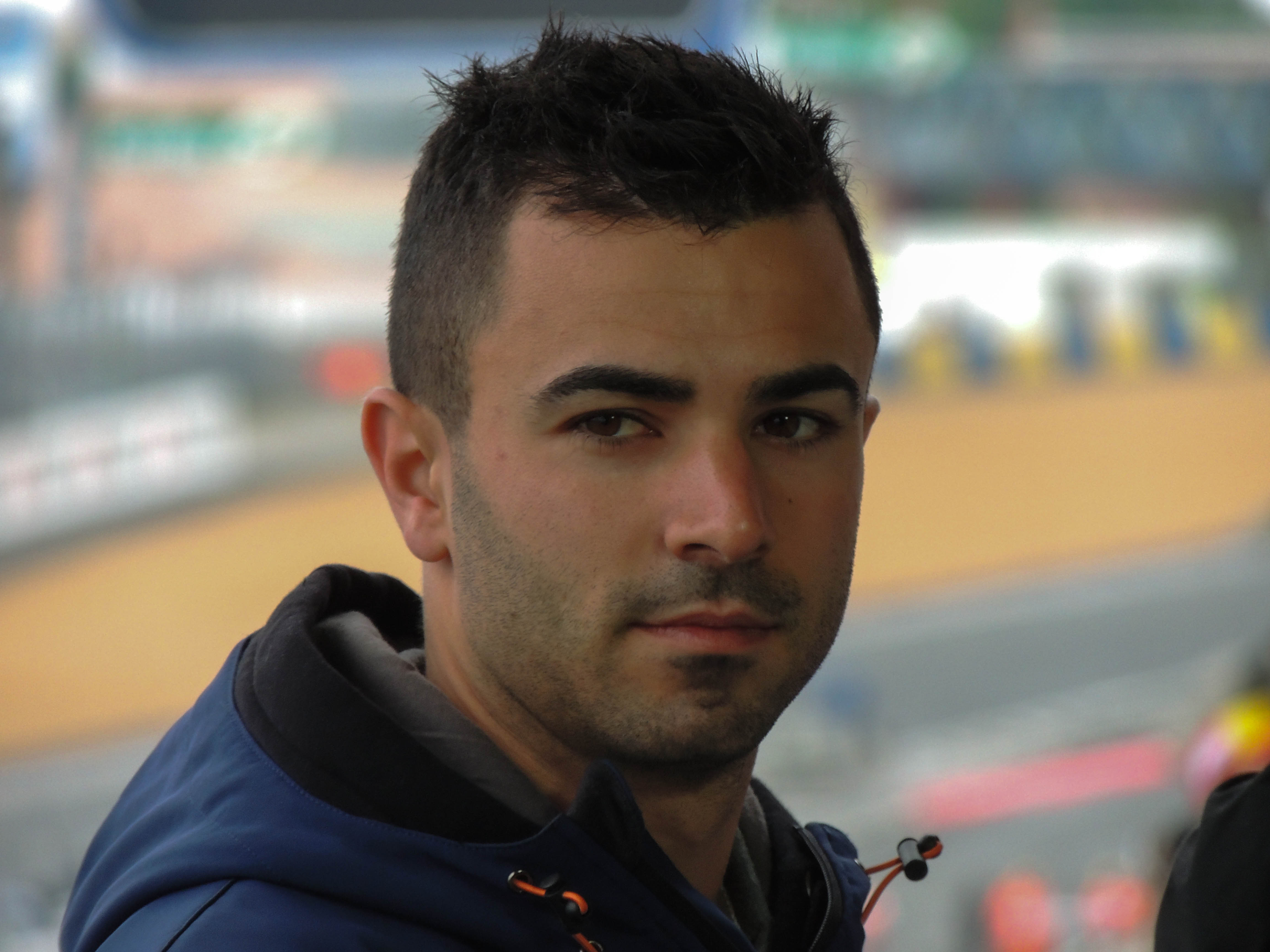
- Di Meglio at the 2013 French Grand Prix
- Nationality: French
- Born: 17 January 1988 (age 38); Toulouse, France
- Current team: Tati Team Ava6 Racing
- Bike number: 4
Motorcycle racing career statistics
MotoGP World Championship
Active years	2014–2015
Manufacturers	Avintia, Ducati
Championships	0
2015 championship position	24th (8 pts)
Starts / Wins / Podiums / Poles / F. laps / Points; 36 / 0 / 0 / 0 / 0 / 17
Moto2 World Championship
Active years	2010–2013
Manufacturers	RSV, Suter, Tech 3, Speed Up, MZ-RE Honda, Kalex, Motobi
Championships	0
2013 championship position	20th (19 pts)
Starts / Wins / Podiums / Poles / F. laps / Points; 59 / 0 / 0 / 0 / 0 / 100
250cc World Championship
Active years	2009
Manufacturers	Aprilia
Championships	0
2009 championship position	8th (107 pts)
Starts / Wins / Podiums / Poles / F. laps / Points; 16 / 0 / 2 / 1 / 0 / 107
125cc World Championship
Active years	2003–2008
Manufacturers	Honda, Aprilia, Derbi
Championships	1 (2008)
2008 championship position	1st (264 pts)
Starts / Wins / Podiums / Poles / F. laps / Points; 91 / 5 / 11 / 2 / 4 / 464
MotoE World Championship
Active years	2019–2020
Manufacturers	Energica
Championships	0
2020 championship position	4th (75 pts)
Starts / Wins / Podiums / Poles / F. laps / Points; 13 / 1 / 4 / 1 / 1 / 138

Mickaël Di Meglio (born 17 January 1988) is a French Grand Prix motorcycle road racer, currently competing in the FIM Endurance World Championship for Tati Team Ava6 Racing. He is a three-time world champion, claiming the 2008 125cc title onboard a Derbi, as well as winning the Endurance World Championship twice, in 2022 with Honda, and the 2016–17 season with Yamaha. Following the 2018–19 FIM EWC season, Di Meglio switched to race for the F.C.C. TSR Honda France team.

Di Meglio has also won the 24 Hours of Le Mans endurance race twice, in 2017 on a Yamaha YZF-R1, and in 2020 on the Honda CBR. He also won the Bol d'Or 24-hour motorcycle endurance race held at Circuit Paul Ricard twice, in 2017 with Yamaha and in 2018 with Honda. He raced at the Grand Prix world championship level between 2003 and 2015. In 2019 and 2020 he also competed in the MotoE World Cup aboard an Energica Ego Corsa.

Di Meglio first came to the attention of the Fédération Française de Motocyclisme (French Motorcycle Federation) 2002 Prix de l'Avenir. He also took a trial with the Liegois team in Carole, with whom he took part in a Spanish Championship race.

== Early life ==
Di Meglio was born in Toulouse. Of Italian descent, his paternal grandfather was born in Lentini (Province of Siracusa).

== Career ==
=== 125cc World Championship ===
==== 2003 ====
When Di Meglio turned 15 years old, he decided to accept offers by the Italian Freesoul Racing Team on Aprilia to debut in the 125cc world championship in 2003. Although he managed to score points, including 13th place at Catalunya, it was a difficult season for him, crashing often and not achieving good results. Later, at the mid-season, he was offered by the Italian MetaSystem Rg Service to replace Italian veteran Andrea Ballerini, but this time the team was on Honda, he tried to attempt to achieve his goals, but he failed to improve and didn't score any championship points.

==== 2004 ====
After a disappointing 2003, Di Meglio vowed to salvage a wrecked debut. He signed with Globet.com Racing on Aprilia alongside Gino Borsoi for the 2004 Grand Prix motorcycle racing season. The start was promising with a front-row start and a fifth-place finish at South Africa, but he failed to be consistent due to several crashes.

==== 2005 ====
Di Meglio stayed with the same team for 2005, but his team joined forces with Team Scot which runs on Honda machinery, the same team that helped Andrea Dovizioso win the 2004 125cc World Championship. Di Meglio was their official rider on board on a factory Honda RS125RW along with Fabrizio Lai but it was under the Kopron Racing World name. His performance improved, scoring points regularly. He performed heroically at the French Grand Prix by fighting for a podium position, finishing fourth and making his home fans happy and entertained. However, it was his podium finish in the wet British Grand Prix by finishing second place behind Julián Simón, which gave him a reputation as a wet weather expert. He also finished a credible fourth place in the hot Qatar Grand Prix ahead of future 125cc champion Thomas Lüthi. The high point of the season for the Frenchman was his controversial win at the Turkish Grand Prix, when Mika Kallio crashed and race leader Luthi had run wide to avoid him.

==== 2006 ====
Di Meglio joined the Fédération Française de Motocyclisme's world championship team run by Alain Bronec for 2006. The FFM Honda GP 125 team also provided him with a factory bike just like the previous season, but despite his big ambitions and a factory bike, he suffered an injury, and scored in only four races that resulted in eight points. He left the team immediately for Team Scot the following year after Portugal as the result of his performance with the team.

==== 2007 ====
For 2007, Di Meglio returned to Team Scot, the team that had helped him win his first Grand Prix in 2005. He was teamed with the young Italian Stefano Musco. In the first few races, he managed to score championship points. He had a very bad crash during the qualifying session of the Spanish Grand Prix, breaking his collarbone and was forced to miss the Turkish Grand Prix as a result. He returned in China to a fourteenth-place finish and followed that with a ninth place at Le Mans. A front row start at Mugello did not come to much either as he crashed out on the third lap of the race. After this, several disappointing race results followed except in the wet race at Donington, where he finished in sixth place and in Japan, where he finished fourth despite crashing out of second place while chasing race leader Mattia Pasini.

==== 2008 ====
For 2008, Di Meglio was offered to ride with the Finnish Ajo Motorsport, teamed with Dominique Aegerter. He returned to Aprilia machines, but officially rides for Aprilia's sister Piaggio company, Derbi. He is riding the Derbi RSA 125 factory bike. His campaign started slowly within Qatar finishing in fourth, beaten to the podium at the line by Stefan Bradl. In Spain and Portugal, Di Meglio picked up minor points and trailed title contender Simone Corsi, but starting in China, Corsi's pace started to slip away including a crash from a minor incident with Lorenzo Zanetti and reigning world champion Gábor Talmácsi struggling that allow Di Meglio to take full advantage. A win in the shortened French Grand Prix started a consistent run lasting until at San Marino where he crashed out while fighting for third place with Corsi. At the Australian Grand Prix, Di Meglio became the only second Frenchman to win the world championship after Arnaud Vincent.

=== 250cc World Championship ===
==== 2009 ====
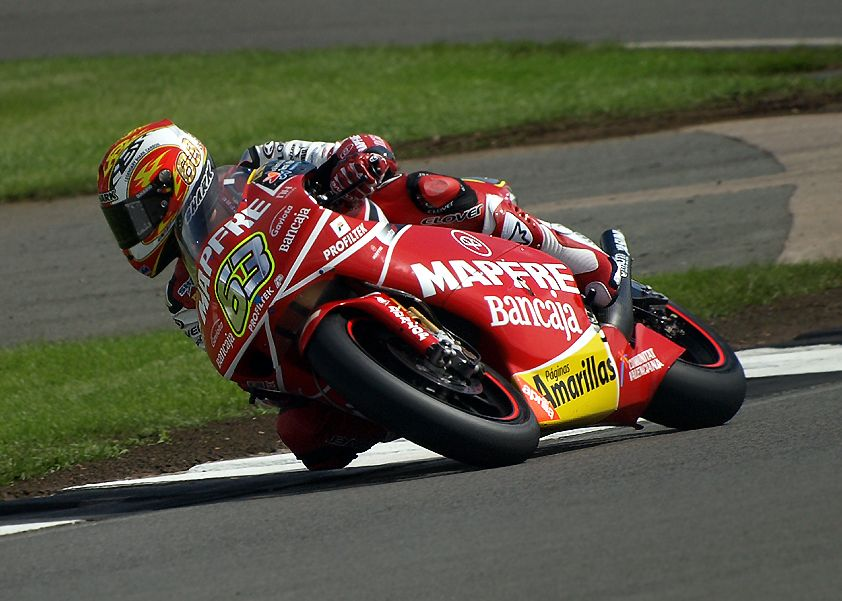
Mike Di Meglio at the 2009 British Grand Prix

For 2009, Di Meglio moved up to the 250cc class with the Aspar Team, alongside Álvaro Bautista. In his debut race in Qatar he qualified third but dropped to 11th on lap 1, before fighting back. He ran fifth in the later stages, but aggressively passed Bautista on the final lap before passing Raffaele de Rosa for third. He did not take another top five finish until round ten at Donington, but hit form from this point on. He took pole at Indianapolis, and claimed second place at Estoril in a photo-finish with Héctor Barberá. He was fighting for top rookie honours with de Rosa but lost out to him as a result of crashing out in Valencia while de Rosa finished third.

=== Moto2 World Championship ===
==== 2010 ====
The 2010 saw the debut of the Moto2 class as the new intermediate class of Grand Prix racing, replacing the 250cc class. Di Meglio failed to take full advantage of it, with several poor race finishes in the first three races of the season and a crash at Mugello. Di Meglio took his first points-scoring finishes at British and Dutch rounds with seventh and eighth respectively. Despite his good results at those rounds, he failed to be competitive again until Australia where he finished in sixth place, having started on the front row.

==== 2011 ====
In 2011, Di Meglio moved to Tech3's Moto2 programme, finishing in 23rd place.

==== 2012 ====
In 2012, Di Meglio split his season between the Speed Up, MZ, and Kiefer Racing teams. He ultimately improved to 22nd place in the championship.

==== 2013 ====
Di Meglio switched to the JiR team for 2013 on Motobi-sponsored machinery. He finished the season in 20th position.

=== MotoGP World Championship ===
==== 2014 ====
Di Meglio made his premier-class debut in 2014 with Avintia Racing. He finished his rookie season in 25th place with nine points, last of all the season regular riders.

==== 2015 ====
For 2015, Di Meglio was retained by Avintia, this time riding a one-year-old Ducati GP14. Despite scoring fewer points than the previous season, he made a slight improvement to finish in 24th place on the season. At the close of the season, Di Meglio was dropped by Avintia in favour of compatriot Loris Baz.

=== FIM Endurance World Championship ===
==== 2016–2017 ====
Following his dismissal from the MotoGP class, Di Meglio moved to endurance racing in the FIM Endurance World Championship with the successful French GMT94 Yamaha team, partnering riders Niccolò Canepa and David Checa. The team achieved wins at the 24 Heures Motos, Oschersleben 8 Hours, and 8 Hours of Slovakia Ring, leading GMT94 to their third team's championship and helping Yamaha to the manufacturer's championship. As Di Meglio did not compete in the first race of the season, the Bol d'Or, he was classified third in the rider's championship behind his teammates and members of the Suzuki Endurance Racing Team.

==== 2017–2018 ====
The following season, Di Meglio remained with GMT94 and teammates Canepa and Checa. The team achieved one win at the Bol d'Or and ultimately finished the season in 2nd place behind F.C.C. TSR Honda France.

==== 2018–2019 ====
For 2018–2019, Di Meglio switched to F.C.C. TSR Honda France, replacing compatriot Alan Techer to partner Joshua Hook and Freddy Foray. They achieved wins at the Bol d'Or and Oschersleben 8 Hours, finishing the teams' and riders' championships in 2nd place behind Team SRC Kawasaki France.

=== MotoE World Cup ===
==== 2019 ====
In late 2018, Di Meglio was confirmed to be rejoining the Grand Prix paddock as part of the inaugural MotoE season, racing for Marc VDS. He achieved a third-place podium in the German opener, followed by a grand slam in Austria (pole, win, and fastest lap), but subsequent retirements and poor finishes relegated him to just sixth position at the conclusion of the season.

== Career statistics ==
=== Grand Prix motorcycle racing ===
==== By season ====
Season	Class	Motorcycle	Team	Number	Race	Win	Podium	Pole	FLap	Pts	Plcd	WCh
2003	125cc	Aprilia RS125R	Freesoul Racing Team	63	15	0	0	0	0	5	28th	–
2003	125cc	Honda RS125R	MetaSystem Rg Service	63	15	0	0	0	0	5	28th	–
2004	125cc	Aprilia RS125R	Globet.com Racing	63	14	0	0	0	0	41	18th	–
2005	125cc	Honda RS125R	Kopron Racing World	63	16	1	2	0	0	104	11th	–
2006	125cc	Honda RS125R	FFM Honda GP 125	63	14	0	0	0	0	8	25th	–
2007	125cc	Honda RS125R	Kopron Team Scot	63	15	0	0	0	0	42	17th	–
2008	125cc	Derbi RSA 125	Ajo Motorsport	63	17	4	9	2	4	264	**1st**	1
2009	250cc	Aprilia RSW 250 LE	Mapfre Aspar Team 250cc	63	16	0	2	1	0	107	8th	–
2009	250cc	Aprilia RSA 250	Mapfre Aspar Team 250cc	63	16	0	2	1	0	107	8th	–
2010	Moto2	RSV Motor DR600	Mapfre Aspar Team	63	16	0	0	0	0	34	20th	–
2010	Moto2	Suter MMX	Mapfre Aspar Team	63	16	0	0	0	0	34	20th	–
2011	Moto2	Tech 3 Mistral 610	Tech 3 Racing	63	17	0	0	0	0	30	23rd	–
2012	Moto2	Speed Up S12	Speed Master Speed Up	63	16	0	0	0	0	17	22nd	–
2012	Moto2	MZ-RE Honda MZ Moto2	Cresto Guide MZ Racing Team	63	16	0	0	0	0	17	22nd	–
2012	Moto2	Kalex Moto2	Kiefer Racing	63	16	0	0	0	0	17	22nd	–
2013	Moto2	Motobi TSR6	JiR	63	10	0	0	0	0	19	20th	–
2014	MotoGP	Avintia GP14	Avintia Racing	63	18	0	0	0	0	9	25th	–
2015	MotoGP	Ducati Desmosedici GP14	Avintia Racing	63	18	0	0	0	0	8	24th	–
2019	MotoE	Energica Ego Corsa	EG 0,0 Marc VDS	63	6	1	2	1	1	63	5th	–
2020	MotoE	Energica Ego Corsa	EG 0,0 Marc VDS	63	7	0	2	0	0	75	4th	–
Total					**215**	**6**	**17**	**4**	**5**	**826**		**1**

==== By class ====
Class	Seasons	1st GP	1st Pod	1st Win	Race	Win	Podiums	Pole	FLap	Pts	WChmp
125cc	2003–2008	2003 Japan	2005 Great Britain	2005 Turkey	91	5	11	2	4	464	1
250cc	2009	2009 Qatar	2009 Qatar		16	0	2	1	0	107	0
Moto2	2010–2013	2010 Qatar			59	0	0	0	0	100	0
MotoGP	2014–2015	2014 Qatar			36	0	0	0	0	17	0
MotoE	2019–2020	2019 Germany	2019 Germany	2019 Austria	13	1	4	1	1	138	0
Total	2003–2015, 2019–2020				**215**	**6**	**17**	**4**	**5**	**826**	**1**

==== Races by year ====
(key) (Races in bold indicate pole position, races in italics indicate fastest lap)

Year	Class	Bike	1	2	3	4	5	6	7	8	9	10	11	12	13	14	15	16	17	18	Pos	Pts
2003	125cc	Aprilia	JPN; 22	RSA; 22	SPA; 28	FRA; 17	ITA; Ret	CAT; 13	NED; 19	GBR; 15	GER; Ret	CZE; 15	POR								28th	5
2003	125cc	Honda												RIO; Ret	PAC; Ret	MAL; 22	AUS; Ret	VAL; Ret			28th	5
2004	125cc	Aprilia	RSA; 5	SPA; Ret	FRA; Ret	ITA; Ret	CAT; 8	NED; 12	RIO; 12	GER; Ret	GBR; 15	CZE; 24	POR; 11	JPN; Ret	QAT	MAL; 17	AUS; 8	VAL			18th	41
2005	125cc	Honda	SPA; 11	POR; 11	CHN; 20	FRA; 4	ITA; Ret	CAT; 16	NED; 14	GBR; 2	GER; Ret	CZE; 7	JPN; 11	MAL; 11	QAT; 4	AUS; 14	TUR; 1	VAL; Ret			11th	104
2006	125cc	Honda	SPA; 21	QAT; Ret	TUR; Ret	CHN; 15	FRA; 27	ITA; Ret	CAT; 18	NED; 13	GBR; 16	GER	CZE; 13	MAL; Ret	AUS; 15	JPN; Ret	POR; Ret	VAL			25th	8
2007	125cc	Honda	QAT; 14	SPA	TUR	CHN; 14	FRA; 9	ITA; Ret	CAT; 19	GBR; 6	NED; Ret	GER; 15	CZE; 20	RSM; 13	POR; 16	JPN; 4	AUS; 14	MAL; 14	VAL; 23		17th	42
2008	125cc	Derbi	QAT; 4	SPA; 9	POR; 7	CHN; 2	FRA; 1	ITA; 4	CAT; 1	GBR; 2	NED; 7	GER; 1	CZE; 2	RSM; Ret	INP; 10	**JPN**; 2	**AUS**; 1	MAL; 5	VAL; 3		**1st**	**264**
2009	250cc	Aprilia	QAT; 3	JPN; Ret	SPA; 11	FRA; Ret	ITA; 12	CAT; 14	NED; 11	GER; Ret	GBR; 5	CZE; 9	**INP**; 4	RSM; 5	POR; 2	AUS; 5	MAL; Ret	VAL; 14			8th	107
2010	Moto2	RSV	QAT; 16	SPA; 22																	20th	34
2010	Moto2	Suter			FRA; 20	ITA; Ret	GBR; 7	NED; 8	CAT; Ret	GER; Ret	CZE; 20	INP; 12	RSM; Ret	ARA; 13	JPN; 18	MAL; 26	AUS; 6	POR; DNQ	VAL; 26		20th	34
2011	Moto2	Tech 3	QAT; 19	SPA; 26	POR; 9	FRA; Ret	CAT; Ret	GBR; 17	NED; Ret	ITA; 24	GER; 16	CZE; 15	INP; 27	RSM; 16	ARA; 12	JPN; 27	AUS; 9	MAL; 14	VAL; 7		23rd	30
2012	Moto2	Speed Up	QAT; 7	SPA; Ret	POR; Ret	FRA; Ret	CAT; Ret	GBR; 18	NED; 15	GER											22nd	17
2012	Moto2	MZ-RE Honda									ITA; 22	INP; 24	CZE; 16								22nd	17
2012	Moto2	Kalex												RSM; 18	ARA; 13	JPN; 14	MAL; Ret	AUS; 14	VAL; 28		22nd	17
2013	Moto2	Motobi	QAT; 16	AME; 10	SPA; 19	FRA; 7	ITA; 18	CAT; 12	NED; Ret	GER; 24	INP; 20	CZE; Ret	GBR	RSM	ARA	MAL	AUS	JPN	VAL		20th	19
2014	MotoGP	Avintia	QAT; 17	AME; 18	ARG; 19	SPA; Ret	FRA; 19	ITA; 18	CAT; Ret	NED; 20	GER; 22	INP; 12	CZE; 18	GBR; 20	RSM; Ret	ARA; 17	JPN; 19	AUS; 14	MAL; 13	VAL; 21	25th	9
2015	MotoGP	Ducati	QAT; 19	AME; Ret	ARG; 18	SPA; 22	FRA; Ret	ITA; 16	CAT; 14	NED; 18	GER; Ret	INP; 17	CZE; 18	GBR; 14	RSM; 13	ARA; 20	JPN; 15	AUS; 20	MAL; 18	VAL; Ret	24th	8
2019	MotoE	Energica	GER; 3	**AUT**; 1	RSM1; Ret	RSM2; 10	VAL1; 10	VAL2; 6													5th	63
2020	MotoE	Energica	SPA; 10	ANC; 7	RSM; 6	EMI1; Ret	EMI2; 6	FRA1; 2	FRA2; 2												4th	75

=== FIM World Endurance Championship ===
==== By team ====
Year	Team	Bike	Rider	TC
2016–17	(France) GMT94 Yamaha	Yamaha YZF-R1	(Italy) Niccolò Canepa (Spain) David Checa (France) Mike Di Meglio (France) Lucas Mahias	**1st**
2017–18	(France) GMT94	Yamaha YZF-R1	(Italy) Niccolò Canepa (Spain) David Checa (France) Mike Di Meglio	**2nd**
2018–19	(Japan) F.C.C TSR Honda	Honda CBR1000RR	(United Kingdom) Josh Hook (France) Freddy Foray (France) Mike Di Meglio	**2nd**
2019–20	(Japan) F.C.C. TSR Honda	Honda CBR1000RR	(France) Freddy Foray (United Kingdom) Josh Hook (France) Mike Di Meglio	**3rd**
2022	(Japan) F.C.C. TSR Honda France	Honda CBR1000RR	(Australia) Joshua Hook (France) Mike Di Meglio (United Kingdom) Gino Rea (France) Alan Techer	**1st**

Year	Team	Bike	Tyre	Rider	Pts	TC
2025	(France) Kawasaki WeBike Trickstar	Kawasaki ZX-10R	**B**	(Spain) Román Ramos (France) Mike Di Meglio (France) Grégory Leblanc	**70***	**3rd***

=== Suzuka 8 Hours results ===
Year	Class	Team	Co-riders	Bike	Pos
2025	**EWC**	(France) Kawasaki Webike Tristar	(Spain) Román Ramos (France) Grégory Leblanc	Kawasaki ZX-10R	8th
2026	**EWC**	(France) Tati Team AVA6 Racing	(France) Hugo Clere (Spain) Isaac Viñales	Honda CBR1000RR	TBD
