= 2007 Valencian Community motorcycle Grand Prix =

2007 Valencian Community Grand Prix
Race details
- Race 18 of 18 races in the 2007 Grand Prix motorcycle racing season
- Date: 4 November 2007
- Official name: Gran Premio bwin.com de la Comunitat Valenciana
- Location: Circuit Ricardo Tormo
- Course: Permanent racing facility; 4.005 km (2.489 mi)

MotoGP
Pole position
- Rider: (Spain) Dani Pedrosa
- Time: 1:31.517
Fastest lap
- Rider: (Spain) Dani Pedrosa
- Time: 1:32.748
Podium
- First: (Spain) Dani Pedrosa
- Second: (Australia) Casey Stoner
- Third: (United States) John Hopkins

250cc
Pole position
- Rider: (Finland) Mika Kallio
- Time: 1:35.166
Fastest lap
- Rider: (Finland) Mika Kallio
- Time: 1:35.659
Podium
- First: (Finland) Mika Kallio
- Second: (San Marino) Alex de Angelis
- Third: (Spain) Alex Debón

125cc
Pole position
- Rider: (Hungary) Gábor Talmácsi
- Time: 1:39.029
Fastest lap
- Rider: (Spain) Héctor Faubel
- Time: 1:39.380
Podium
- First: (Spain) Héctor Faubel
- Second: (Hungary) Gábor Talmácsi
- Third: (Spain) Sergio Gadea

The 2007 Valencian Community motorcycle Grand Prix was the last round of the 2007 MotoGP championship. It took place on the weekend of 2–4 November 2007 at the Circuit Ricardo Tormo in Valencia, Spain. In the MotoGP class Dani Pedrosa took 2nd in the championship by a single point from Valentino Rossi, while John Hopkins overhauled Marco Melandri to take 4th. In the 125cc class Gábor Talmácsi finished second behind teammate Héctor Faubel, which meant the Hungarian became the world champion of 2007.

== MotoGP classification ==
Pos.	No.	Rider	Team	Manufacturer	Laps	Time/Retired	Grid	Points
1	26	(Spain) Dani Pedrosa	Repsol Honda Team	Honda	30	46:43.533	1	25
2	27	(Australia) Casey Stoner	Ducati Marlboro Team	Ducati	30	+5.447	2	20
3	21	(United States) John Hopkins	Rizla Suzuki MotoGP	Suzuki	30	+20.404	7	16
4	33	(Italy) Marco Melandri	Honda Gresini	Honda	30	+24.827	10	13
5	65	(Italy) Loris Capirossi	Ducati Marlboro Team	Ducati	30	+25.804	8	11
6	71	(Australia) Chris Vermeulen	Rizla Suzuki MotoGP	Suzuki	30	+25.862	11	10
7	4	(Brazil) Alex Barros	Pramac d'Antin	Ducati	30	+29.470	12	9
8	1	(United States) Nicky Hayden	Repsol Honda Team	Honda	30	+30.333	3	8
9	14	(France) Randy de Puniet	Kawasaki Racing Team	Kawasaki	30	+30.895	4	7
10	24	(Spain) Toni Elías	Honda Gresini	Honda	30	+31.030	14	6
11	50	(France) Sylvain Guintoli	Dunlop Yamaha Tech 3	Yamaha	30	+38.763	5	5
12	7	(Spain) Carlos Checa	Honda LCR	Honda	30	+42.506	9	4
13	5	(United States) Colin Edwards	Fiat Yamaha Team	Yamaha	30	+46.572	15	3
14	56	(Japan) Shinya Nakano	Konica Minolta Honda	Honda	30	+50.220	13	2
15	6	(Japan) Makoto Tamada	Dunlop Yamaha Tech 3	Yamaha	30	+56.879	6	1
16	13	(Australia) Anthony West	Kawasaki Racing Team	Kawasaki	30	+1:15.369	16	
Ret	46	(Italy) Valentino Rossi	Fiat Yamaha Team	Yamaha	19	Retirement	17	
Ret	80	(United States) Kurtis Roberts	Team Roberts	KR212V	10	Retirement	18	
DNS	57	(United Kingdom) Chaz Davies	Pramac d'Antin	Ducati		Did not start		

== 250 cc classification ==
Pos.	No.	Rider	Manufacturer	Laps	Time/Retired	Grid	Points
1	36	(Finland) Mika Kallio	KTM	27	43:28.349	1	25
2	3	(San Marino) Alex de Angelis	Aprilia	27	+0.371	9	20
3	6	(Spain) Alex Debón	Aprilia	27	+6.797	8	16
4	34	(Italy) Andrea Dovizioso	Honda	27	+6.880	10	13
5	80	(Spain) Héctor Barberá	Aprilia	27	+12.767	5	11
6	60	(Spain) Julián Simón	Honda	27	+13.030	7	10
7	1	(Spain) Jorge Lorenzo	Aprilia	27	+14.751	2	9
8	55	(Japan) Yuki Takahashi	Honda	27	+16.437	3	8
9	12	(Switzerland) Thomas Lüthi	Aprilia	27	+16.551	14	7
10	4	(Japan) Hiroshi Aoyama	KTM	27	+20.223	11	6
11	58	(Italy) Marco Simoncelli	Gilera	27	+23.626	4	5
12	41	(Spain) Aleix Espargaró	Aprilia	27	+31.805	12	4
13	15	(Italy) Roberto Locatelli	Gilera	27	+34.310	13	3
14	25	(Italy) Alex Baldolini	Aprilia	27	+58.825	20	2
15	8	(Thailand) Ratthapark Wilairot	Honda	27	+58.845	19	1
16	28	(Germany) Dirk Heidolf	Aprilia	27	+59.688	18	
17	73	(Japan) Shuhei Aoyama	Honda	27	+1:01.510	15	
18	7	(Spain) Efrén Vázquez	Aprilia	27	+1:19.620	23	
19	11	(Japan) Taro Sekiguchi	Aprilia	27	+1:20.598	27	
20	21	(Italy) Federico Sandi	Aprilia	27	+1:24.412	24	
21	50	(Republic of Ireland) Eugene Laverty	Honda	27	+1:27.529	25	
22	31	(Spain) Álvaro Molina	Aprilia	26	+1 lap	22	
23	10	(Hungary) Imre Tóth	Aprilia	26	+1 lap	26	
24	53	(Spain) Santiago Barragán	Honda	26	+1 lap	28	
Ret	19	(Spain) Álvaro Bautista	Aprilia	20	Accident	6	
Ret	17	(Czech Republic) Karel Abraham	Aprilia	20	Accident	21	
Ret	18	(Germany) Joshua Sommer	Honda	19	Retirement	29	
Ret	16	(France) Jules Cluzel	Aprilia	15	Accident	17	
Ret	32	(Italy) Fabrizio Lai	Aprilia	0	Accident	16	
OFFICIAL 250cc REPORT

== 125 cc classification ==
Pos.	No.	Rider	Manufacturer	Laps	Time/Retired	Grid	Points
1	55	(Spain) Héctor Faubel	Aprilia	24	40:14.228	2	25
2	14	(Hungary) Gábor Talmácsi	Aprilia	24	+0.185	1	20
3	33	(Spain) Sergio Gadea	Aprilia	24	+0.286	3	16
4	75	(Italy) Mattia Pasini	Aprilia	24	+0.826	8	13
5	52	(Czech Republic) Lukáš Pešek	Derbi	24	+0.878	4	11
6	12	(Spain) Esteve Rabat	Honda	24	+5.850	11	10
7	22	(Spain) Pablo Nieto	Aprilia	24	+9.038	5	9
8	38	(United Kingdom) Bradley Smith	Honda	24	+13.034	12	8
9	71	(Japan) Tomoyoshi Koyama	KTM	24	+20.734	15	7
10	44	(Spain) Pol Espargaró	Aprilia	24	+21.002	9	6
11	18	(Spain) Nicolás Terol	Derbi	24	+21.346	7	5
12	24	(Italy) Simone Corsi	Aprilia	24	+32.078	6	4
13	60	(Austria) Michael Ranseder	Derbi	24	+39.542	16	3
14	7	(France) Alexis Masbou	Honda	24	+39.548	18	2
15	34	(Switzerland) Randy Krummenacher	KTM	24	+39.706	17	1
16	51	(United States) Stevie Bonsey	KTM	24	+39.880	27	
17	27	(Italy) Stefano Bianco	Aprilia	24	+40.877	19	
18	77	(Switzerland) Dominique Aegerter	Aprilia	24	+40.998	23	
19	20	(Italy) Roberto Tamburini	Aprilia	24	+44.169	26	
20	29	(Italy) Andrea Iannone	Aprilia	24	+44.173	25	
21	99	(United Kingdom) Danny Webb	Honda	24	+54.912	28	
22	95	(Romania) Robert Mureșan	Derbi	24	+1:09.235	29	
23	63	(France) Mike Di Meglio	Honda	24	+1:12.208	21	
24	37	(Netherlands) Joey Litjens	Honda	24	+1:12.315	32	
25	13	(Italy) Dino Lombardi	Honda	24	+1:12.770	34	
26	78	(Spain) Daniel Sáez	Aprilia	24	+1:12.786	31	
27	30	(Spain) Pere Tutusaus	Aprilia	24	+1:12.868	33	
28	79	(Italy) Ferruccio Lamborghini	Aprilia	24	+1:16.195	36	
29	40	(Hungary) Alen Győrfi	Aprilia	24	+1:38.850	37	
30	6	(Spain) Joan Olivé	Aprilia	23	+1 lap	13	
Ret	8	(Italy) Lorenzo Zanetti	Aprilia	11	Accident	24	
Ret	53	(Italy) Simone Grotzkyj	Aprilia	11	Retirement	35	
Ret	11	(Germany) Sandro Cortese	Aprilia	9	Accident	10	
Ret	98	(Japan) Takaaki Nakagami	Honda	9	Accident	20	
Ret	35	(Italy) Raffaele De Rosa	Aprilia	7	Accident	22	
Ret	17	(Germany) Stefan Bradl	Aprilia	1	Accident	14	
Ret	76	(Spain) Iván Maestro	Aprilia	0	Retirement	30	
OFFICIAL 125cc REPORT

== Championship standings after the race (MotoGP) ==
Below are the standings for the top five riders and constructors after round eighteen has concluded.

Riders' Championship standings

Pos.	Rider	Points
1	(Australia) Casey Stoner	367
2	(Spain) Dani Pedrosa	242
3	(Italy) Valentino Rossi	241
4	(United States) John Hopkins	189
5	(Italy) Marco Melandri	187

Constructors' Championship standings

Pos.	Constructor	Points
1	(Italy) Ducati	394
2	(Japan) Honda	313
3	(Japan) Yamaha	283
4	(Japan) Suzuki	241
5	(Japan) Kawasaki	144

- Note: Only the top five positions are included for both sets of standings.

Previous race: 2007 Malaysian Grand Prix	FIM Grand Prix World Championship; 2007 season	Next race: 2008 Qatar Grand Prix
Previous race: 2006 Valencian Grand Prix	Valencian Community motorcycle Grand Prix	Next race: 2008 Valencian Grand Prix
