= 2005 Chinese motorcycle Grand Prix =

(China) 2005 Chinese Grand Prix
Race details
- Race 3 of 17 races in the 2005 Grand Prix motorcycle racing season
- Date: 1 May 2005
- Official name: Taobao.com Grand Prix of China
- Location: Shanghai International Circuit
- Course: Permanent racing facility; 5.281 km (3.281 mi)

MotoGP
Pole position
- Rider: (Spain) Sete Gibernau
- Time: 1:59.710
Fastest lap
- Rider: (Brazil) Alex Barros
- Time: 2:13.716 on lap 21
Podium
- First: (Italy) Valentino Rossi
- Second: (France) Olivier Jacque
- Third: (Italy) Marco Melandri

250cc
Pole position
- Rider: (Australia) Casey Stoner
- Time: 2:06.196
Fastest lap
- Rider: (Italy) Andrea Dovizioso
- Time: 2:15.608 on lap 16
Podium
- First: (Australia) Casey Stoner
- Second: (Italy) Andrea Dovizioso
- Third: (Japan) Hiroshi Aoyama

125cc
Pole position
- Rider: (Finland) Mika Kallio
- Time: 2:13.535
Fastest lap
- Rider: (Italy) Fabrizio Lai
- Time: 2:23.967 on lap 18
Podium
- First: (Italy) Mattia Pasini
- Second: (Italy) Fabrizio Lai
- Third: (Hungary) Gábor Talmácsi

The 2005 Chinese motorcycle Grand Prix was the third round of the 2005 MotoGP Championship. It took place on the weekend of 29 April – 1 May 2005 at the Shanghai International Circuit. It was the first time that MotoGP raced in China.

== MotoGP race report ==
This race was most notable for the very wet race conditions, as well as Valentino Rossi's win and Olivier Jacque's first and only podium on the Kawasaki.

After two races, it is Valentino Rossi who has a narrow lead in the standings with 45 points, followed by Brazilian veteran Alex Barros with 38 points and Marco Melandri with 29 points.

During Saturday qualifying it was Sete Gibernau who took his first pole position of the year with a time of 1:59.710, followed by Marco Melandri in second and Loris Capirossi in third place. The second row of the grid consists out of John Hopkins, Nicky Hayden and finally Valentino Rossi in fourth, fifth and sixth position. Olivier Jacque only managed to qualify a lowly fifteenth, replacing the injured Alex Hofmann after not racing for seven months and Dutch veteran Jurgen van den Goorbergh replaced the injured Makoto Tamada as well.

All the riders make their way through the warm-up lap, then line up on their respective grid slots. As the lights go out, Hopkins blasts past Melandri and then Gibernau, who goes wide entering Turn 1 to take a surprise lead on the opening lap. Gibernau goes from first to third as teammate Melandri snatches second from him. At the first sector, the top six is as follows: Hopkins, Melandri, Gibernau, Kenny Roberts Jr., Nicky Hayden and Rossi. At Turn 5, Rossi takes fifth from Hayden and Roberts Jr. picks up two positions at Turn 6 by passing both Gibernau and Melandri on the outside, catapulting him into second behind his teammate. At Turn 8, Rossi also makes quick work of Melandri by going down his inside and effortlessly passing the Movistar Honda rider for fourth place. Rossi then also passes Gibernau for third, going side by side with him at the short straight before Turn 11 but taking the lead by going up his inside. Hopkins then makes a mistake at Turn 12, going wide and gifting Roberts Jr. the lead and Rossi second place. Gibernau also goes slightly wide, granting Toni Elías - who had worked his way up the field - just enough space to steal fourth place away from him. Elías then goes up the inside and takes third from a now struggling Hopkins at the end of the long straight before Turn 14.

On lap two, Roberts Jr. has pulled a slight gap back to Rossi, who is being pursuited himself by Elías. A gap back to Hopkins now also has formed. Max Biaggi goes up the inside of Gibernau at Turn 1 for fifth place. Coming out of Turn 4, he has a bit of a wobble which allows Gibernau to almost retake the place. At the entrance of Turn 7, Biaggi then tries a move at the inside on Hopkins for fourth, the American holding on as they go side by side through the corner and winning the battle with Biaggi, who then gets overtaken by Gibernau instead as he exits the corner with poor traction. At Turn 11, Gibernau takes fourth away from Hopkins by diving up his inside, with Biaggi trying likewise and almost clipping the back of Hopkins as a result. Exiting the swooping Turn 13, Biaggi and Melandri both overtake Hopkins coming up to the long straight, making good use of their superior Honda top speed to pass the Suzuki effortlessly. At the end of the straight, multiple riders make their moves. Hopkins repasses Melandri for sixth, Capirossi passes Hayden for - and runs wide doing so, allowing Jacque to pass both riders for eighth place. Barros also manages to overtake van den Goorbergh for eleventh, with Troy Bayliss trying likewise but the Dutchman holding him off at Turn 16. Jacque then gets passed by Hayden at the short straight before Turn 16, demoting him to ninth position.

Lap three and Rossi has closed the gap to leader Roberts Jr by now. Jacque, making good use of a good exit of the final corner, retakes eighth from Hayden but with Capirossi using his Ducati speed on the start/finish straight before Turn 1, he passes both riders, demoting the Frenchman to ninth and the American to tenth place. Van den Goorbergh also managed to pass both Barros and Hayden at the first sector, then passes Capirossi on the inside of Turn 7 by taking a tighter line for ninth position, with Jacque also having passed the Italian earlier on to reclaim eighth place. Jacque's teammate Shinya Nakano retires from the race due to technical problems. Jacque then takes two positions in two corners - one by diving down the inside of Melandri at Turn 11 for seventh and the other by exiting better out of Turn 12 to pass Hopkins at the beginning of the long straight. Hopkins goes up the inside of Melandri for sixth at the end of the long straight, with Jacque and Van den Goorbergh right behind the battling duo.

On lap four, the top nine looks as follows: Roberts Jr. - who just set the fastest lap of the race -, Rossi, Elías, Gibernau, Biaggi, Hopkins, Melandri, Jacque and Van den Goorbergh. Gibernau passes Elías and takes third at the entry of Turn 1, with Dutchman Van den Goorbergh taking eighth place from Jacque as well by passing him on the inside of Turn 1. Melandri tries likewise at the exit for sixth place but fails and almost touches the rear of Hopkins in the process. Roberts Jr. at the front meanwhile has a significant gap back to Rossi, with the Italian having an even bigger gap back to Elías in third. It is then signalled that Barros has jumped the start, meaning he has to come in and serve a penalty. Biaggi has also overtaken Elías for fourth. Elías has also been accredited with a jump start, making him the second rider to have been accredited a jump start.

Lap five and Rossi is now slowly closing the gap to Roberts Jr. 'The Doctor' has a little moment as he touches the white line at Turn 5 but doesn't lose any time or positions from it. Roberts Jr. then runs wide at the Turn 6 hairpin, gifting Rossi the lead of the race. Bayliss has gone down and Roberts Jr. is slowing significantly, stopping on the outside of Turn 11. He then continues, but is practically out of contention due to technical problems. This moves Gibernau up into second and Biaggi up into third place.

On lap six, Hopkins sets the fastest lap of the race in fifth position. Jacque has moved up into sixth and Van den Goorbergh into seventh thanks to the Frenchman overtaking Van den Goorbergh and because of Roberts Jr.'s retirement. Carlos Checa in the back has also crashed out at Turn 16 - sliding very far onto the pit road due to the vast levels of water on the circuit - the rider running to his machine to get back into the race but to no avail. Roberts Jr. now has made it back into the pits, confirming his retirement. Exiting Turn 9, Jacque has a big moment, almost causing him to crash but somehow holds on and doesn't lose a place. At the end of the long straight before Turn 14, Hopkins passes the now fading Elías for fourth place, Jacque then trying to do the same but running wide, allowing the Spaniard to reclaim fifth place. Just as it looks like Jacque makes a move to take fifth place again, Elías goes straight on into the pits to take his jumpstart penalty, promoting the Frenchman up to fifth without much effort.

Lap seven has started and Rossi now sets the fastest lap of the race. Elías now has taken his penalty and rejoins at the back of the field. Hopkins - comfortably in fourth - goes wide exiting Turn 3 and into the gravel trap. The rider manages to stay on the bike and continue his race, albeit a couple of places down. This promotes Jacque up into fourth position. The gap Rossi has to Gibernau in sector 2 is +5.702 seconds, then it increases to +5.965 seconds at sector 3.

On lap eight, the top nine is as follows: Rossi, Gibernau, Biaggi, Jacque, Van den Goorbergh, Melandri, Barros, Hayden and Capirossi. The gap Rossi has to Gibernau has increased again, this time it is +5.996 seconds. Barros comes into the pits to serve his jumpstart penalty, demoting him to the back of the field as well.

Lap nine and the gap Rossi has to Gibernau has decreased slightly, from +5.996 to +5.898 seconds. Barros exits the pits and is well behind the leading group now. During this lap, Jacque has caught third place Biaggi and overtakes him at the entry of Turn 11 for third, going up his inside and outbreaking him. Biaggi gets back at him by using his superior Honda top end speed at the end of the long straight leading up to Turn 14, retaking the bottom step of the podium. Jacque then retakes third once more by diving down the inside of the Italian at the short left-hand kink of Turn 16.

On lap ten and Jacque sets a surprise fast lap, still being harassed by Biaggi as he does so. Biaggi tries to lunge at his inside at Turn 1 but isn't able to, allowing Jacque to now ride away and hunt down Gibernau for second position. The gap Gibernau has to Jacque is +1.448 seconds in sector 2, diminishing to +1.254 seconds in sector 3.

Lap eleven - the halfway point of the race - and Jacque sets another fastest lap, still hunting down Gibernau. Van den Goorbergh is still in fifth place behind Biaggi. Jacque is still closing down the gap to Gibernau.

On lap twelve, Jacque now caught the Spaniard and is right behind him all throughout the lap. Exiting Turn 13, Jacque gets on the kerb and has a bit of a wobble but doesn't crash or lose places.

Lap thirteen and Jacque is still all over the back of Gibernau. However, he is not able to make a move on Frenchman due to the superior top end speed of the Honda.

Crossing the line to start lap fourteen, Rossi now sets the fastest lap of the race. Jacque is still stalking Gibernau's Honda.

On lap fifteen, Melandri sixth placed Melandri now sets the fastest lap of the race. He is right behind Van den Goorbergh but runs his bike wide at Turn 6, making him lose ground to the Dutchman. Rossi's teammate Colin Edwards is shown with a puff of smoke coming out of his engine exiting Turn 14 on the previous lap, but it is unclear whether or not he has engine troubles. It is on this lap that Jacque has also finally managed to pass Gibernau for second position, now setting his sights for race leader Rossi.

Lap sixteen and the top nine consists out of Rossi, Jacque, Gibernau, Biaggi, Van den Goorbergh, Melandri, Hayden, Hopkins and Edwards, who does not seem to have any engine problems. Rossi's gap to Jacque is +6.181 seconds in sector 1, then increases to +6.230 seconds in sector 2. Melandri meanwhile has overtaken Van den Goorbergh and is now right behind Biaggi, chasing down fourth place.

On lap seventeen, Melandri shadows Biaggi, then makes a move by outbreaking him at Turn 6, taking fourth. Rossi's gap to Jacque is now +5.889 seconds.

Lap eighteen and Jacque is still clawing back time from Rossi. The gap Rossi has to Jacque is now +5.201 seconds, then diminishes even more to +5.023 seconds at sector 1. The gap in sector 2 increases again slightly to +5.091 seconds.

As Rossi crosses the line and lap nineteen begins, his gap to Jacque has now decreased even further - from +5.091 to +4.379 seconds. The gap in sector 2 has decreased even further to +3.745, then got cut again to +3.493 in sector 3.

On lap twenty, Rossi's gap to Jacque continues to get slimmer - now only being +3.297 seconds. Jacque also sets the fastest lap of the race as well. In sector 1, the gap decreases slightly to +3.190 seconds. In sector 2, the gap comes down again to +3.141 and in sector 3, the gap increases again slightly to +3.236 due to a slight moment Jacque had coming out of Turn 13.

Lap twenty-one, the penultimate lap, begins and Rossi sets the fastest lap for a brief moment, only for Jacque to set a faster one behind him. Gibernau crosses the line a distant third and is shaking his head, either out of disappointment or to get rid of some of the water on his helmet. In sector 1, Rossi's lead to Jacque continues to diminish - this time it's only +3.031 seconds. In sector 2, Jacque continues his charge and the gap comes down to only +2.599 seconds. In sector 3, the new gap consists out of +2.411 seconds - another slight decrease.

The last lap - lap twenty-two - begins and Rossi's gap to Jacque increases again to +2.557 seconds. The gap increases once again in sector 1 to +2.679 seconds. Behind the duo, Melandri has caught a struggling Gibernau and is all over the back of him as well. The gap Rossi has to Jacque in sector 2 has decreased again, this time it's +2.619 seconds. At Turn 11, Melandri overtakes his teammate and takes third on the last lap. In sector three - the final sector before the finish - Rossi's lead to Jacque has decreased again to +2.502 seconds. The gap is more than enough for Rossi to cruise to the flag, putting his arms in the air and win the race - his first in China and second of the season - with Jacque coming home in a stunning second place - Jacque's first ever podium in the premier class - with Melandri finishing third. Gibernau crosses the line in fourth, Biaggi in fifth and the other replacement rider Van den Goorbergh finishes in a great sixth place.

On the parade lap back to parc fermé, Rossi stops for some of his fans - who invaded the track - at the outside of Turn 2 to celebrate his win. Gibernau meanwhile has parked up his stricken Gresini Honda at the armco barrier at the end of the start/finish straight before Turn 1, looking at his bike chain to figure out what the problem is, then walks over to the pits. After the celebrations, Rossi gets going again, throwing his arm in the air in celebration. Fireworks also go off to celebrate Rossi's win, with 'The Doctor' stopping to make sure his number 46 is still attached on the bike. He kisses his bike, then steps back on and continues on. An ecstatic Jacque also talks to a happy Van den Goorbergh on the bike as the fireworks still go off.

Melandri is the first rider to arrive at parc fermé, being awaited by two of his Gresini Honda crewmembers, one of which hugs him for his achievement. Jacque also arrives at parc fermé and immediately goes to hug his team at the fence. Finally, Rossi also arrives and jubilantly puts his arms in air as two Gauloises Yamaha crewmembers hug and congratulate him. Rossi then talks to his team and salutes his fans by looking into the camera and doing a peace sign, showing off the rubber gloves he has on. He then congratulates and hugs Jacque. Rossi takes off his helmet, kisses the camera screen in glee, then goes over to a group of fans at parc fermé to hug them also.

The riders make their way up onto the podium, starting with Melandri, then an ecstatic Jacque and a happy Rossi. He shakes hands with Melandri, then Jacque. Chief mechanic Davide Brivio stands on the podium also to receive the constructors trophy. The respective figures hand out the trophies, then the Italian national anthem plays for Rossi. The champagne get handed out and Rossi cheekily sprays one of the girls on the podium, as well as the other two who by now also spray the champagne. The trio then group together for the final photo shoot for the press.

Rossi's win extends his lead in the championship. The Italian now has 70 points, followed by the other Italian Melandri who overtakes Barros in the title hunt with 45 points, followed by Barros with 43 points.

== MotoGP classification ==
Pos.	No.	Rider	Team	Manufacturer	Laps	Time/Retired	Grid	Points
1	46	(Italy) Valentino Rossi	Gauloises Yamaha Team	Yamaha	22	50:02.463	6	25
2	19	(France) Olivier Jacque	Kawasaki Racing Team	Kawasaki	22	+1.700	15	20
3	33	(Italy) Marco Melandri	Movistar Honda MotoGP	Honda	22	+16.574	2	16
4	15	(Spain) Sete Gibernau	Movistar Honda MotoGP	Honda	22	+18.906	1	13
5	3	(Italy) Max Biaggi	Repsol Honda Team	Honda	22	+19.551	14	11
6	16	(Netherlands) Jurgen vd Goorbergh	Konica Minolta Honda	Honda	22	+21.622	19	10
7	21	(United States) John Hopkins	Team Suzuki MotoGP	Suzuki	22	+25.883	4	9
8	5	(United States) Colin Edwards	Gauloises Yamaha Team	Yamaha	22	+31.033	13	8
9	69	(United States) Nicky Hayden	Repsol Honda Team	Honda	22	+39.299	5	7
10	11	(Spain) Rubén Xaus	Fortuna Yamaha Team	Yamaha	22	+40.991	16	6
11	4	(Brazil) Alex Barros	Camel Honda	Honda	22	+44.014	11	5
12	65	(Italy) Loris Capirossi	Ducati Marlboro Team	Ducati	22	+44.401	3	4
13	77	(United Kingdom) James Ellison	Blata WCM	Blata	22	+53.449	21	3
14	24	(Spain) Toni Elías	Fortuna Yamaha Team	Yamaha	22	+1:05.853	8	2
15	72	(Japan) Tohru Ukawa	Moriwaki Racing	Moriwaki	22	+1:09.480	18	1
16	44	(Italy) Roberto Rolfo	D'Antin MotoGP – Pramac	Ducati	22	+1:15.293	17	
Ret	27	(Italy) Franco Battaini	Blata WCM	Blata	16	Accident	20	
Ret	10	(United States) Kenny Roberts Jr.	Team Suzuki MotoGP	Suzuki	5	Retirement	9	
Ret	12	(Australia) Troy Bayliss	Camel Honda	Honda	4	Accident	12	
Ret	7	(Spain) Carlos Checa	Ducati Marlboro Team	Ducati	4	Accident	7	
Ret	56	(Japan) Shinya Nakano	Kawasaki Racing Team	Kawasaki	2	Retirement	10	

== 250 cc classification ==
Pos.	No.	Rider	Manufacturer	Laps	Time/Retired	Grid	Points
1	27	(Australia) Casey Stoner	Aprilia	21	48:07.205	1	25
2	34	(Italy) Andrea Dovizioso	Honda	21	+0.249	3	20
3	73	(Japan) Hiroshi Aoyama	Honda	21	+21.434	5	16
4	5	(San Marino) Alex de Angelis	Aprilia	21	+28.589	11	13
5	19	(Argentina) Sebastián Porto	Aprilia	21	+31.879	8	11
6	1	(Spain) Daniel Pedrosa	Honda	21	+40.520	2	10
7	80	(Spain) Héctor Barberá	Honda	21	+46.332	6	9
8	24	(Italy) Simone Corsi	Aprilia	21	+1:01.615	9	8
9	48	(Spain) Jorge Lorenzo	Honda	21	+1:04.261	4	7
10	55	(Japan) Yuki Takahashi	Honda	21	+1:05.823	10	6
11	6	(Spain) Alex Debón	Honda	21	+1:08.145	14	5
12	50	(France) Sylvain Guintoli	Aprilia	21	+1:09.653	15	4
13	25	(Italy) Alex Baldolini	Aprilia	21	+2:01.116	16	3
14	96	(Czech Republic) Jakub Smrž	Honda	21	+2:01.367	19	2
15	28	(Germany) Dirk Heidolf	Honda	21	+2:01.893	18	1
16	15	(Italy) Roberto Locatelli	Aprilia	21	+2:05.297	12	
17	18	(Sweden) Fredrik Watz	Yamaha	21	+2:07.361	25	
18	7	(France) Randy de Puniet	Aprilia	21	+2:13.455	7	
19	12	(Hungary) Gábor Rizmayer	Yamaha	21	+2:26.199	22	
20	62	(China) He Zi Xian	Yamaha	20	+1 lap	27	
21	58	(China) Huang Shi Zhao	Yamaha	20	+1 lap	26	
Ret	32	(Italy) Mirko Giansanti	Aprilia	18	Retirement	21	
Ret	8	(Italy) Andrea Ballerini	Aprilia	17	Accident	17	
Ret	64	(Czech Republic) Radomil Rous	Honda	17	Retirement	20	
Ret	38	(France) Grégory Leblanc	Aprilia	14	Retirement	23	
Ret	17	(Germany) Steve Jenkner	Aprilia	2	Retirement	24	
Ret	57	(United Kingdom) Chaz Davies	Aprilia	2	Retirement	13	
DNS	36	(Colombia) Martín Cárdenas	Aprilia		Did not start		
DNQ	60	(China) Wang Zhu	Aprilia		Did not qualify		
DNQ	9	(France) Hugo Marchand	Aprilia		Did not qualify		
DNQ	61	(China) Li Zheng Peng	Aprilia		Did not qualify		
DNQ	59	(China) Huang Zhi Yu	Honda		Did not qualify		

== 125 cc classification ==
Pos.	No.	Rider	Manufacturer	Laps	Time/Retired	Grid	Points
1	75	(Italy) Mattia Pasini	Aprilia	19	46:30.273	15	25
2	32	(Italy) Fabrizio Lai	Honda	19	+0.065	6	20
3	14	(Hungary) Gábor Talmácsi	KTM	19	+4.953	3	16
4	12	(Switzerland) Thomas Lüthi	Honda	19	+8.785	4	13
5	71	(Japan) Tomoyoshi Koyama	Honda	19	+10.707	8	11
6	58	(Italy) Marco Simoncelli	Aprilia	19	+11.959	2	10
7	41	(Spain) Aleix Espargaró	Honda	19	+25.951	16	9
8	22	(Spain) Pablo Nieto	Derbi	19	+27.152	14	8
9	52	(Czech Republic) Lukáš Pešek	Derbi	19	+28.154	7	7
10	60	(Spain) Julián Simón	KTM	19	+28.707	5	6
11	36	(Finland) Mika Kallio	KTM	19	+32.488	1	5
12	54	(San Marino) Manuel Poggiali	Gilera	19	+44.317	17	4
13	15	(Italy) Michele Pirro	Malaguti	19	+58.618	11	3
14	6	(Spain) Joan Olivé	Aprilia	19	+59.376	27	2
15	55	(Spain) Héctor Faubel	Aprilia	19	+59.879	10	1
16	9	(Japan) Toshihisa Kuzuhara	Honda	19	+1:00.836	9	
17	19	(Spain) Álvaro Bautista	Honda	19	+1:05.476	13	
18	29	(Italy) Andrea Iannone	Aprilia	19	+1:06.354	21	
19	16	(Netherlands) Raymond Schouten	Honda	19	+1:13.199	31	
20	63	(France) Mike Di Meglio	Honda	19	+1:14.696	12	
21	7	(France) Alexis Masbou	Honda	19	+1:42.293	19	
22	28	(Spain) Jordi Carchano	Aprilia	19	+1:46.227	32	
23	84	(Spain) Julián Miralles	Aprilia	19	+1:48.723	23	
24	38	(China) Cheung Wai On	Honda	19	+1:52.912	34	
25	10	(Italy) Federico Sandi	Honda	19	+2:06.791	33	
26	18	(Spain) Nicolás Terol	Derbi	19	+2:21.419	30	
27	44	(Czech Republic) Karel Abraham	Aprilia	19	+2:21.591	29	
28	35	(Italy) Raffaele De Rosa	Aprilia	19	+2:24.441	26	
29	33	(Spain) Sergio Gadea	Aprilia	18	+1 lap	22	
30	45	(Hungary) Imre Tóth	Aprilia	17	+2 laps	25	
31	39	(China) Chow Ho-Wan	Honda	15	+4 laps	35	
Ret	25	(Germany) Dario Giuseppetti	Aprilia	17	Retirement	28	
Ret	11	(Germany) Sandro Cortese	Honda	11	Accident	18	
Ret	47	(Spain) Ángel Rodríguez	Honda	6	Retirement	24	
Ret	43	(Spain) Manuel Hernández	Aprilia	3	Retirement	20	
DNS	26	(Switzerland) Vincent Braillard	Aprilia		Did not start		
DNS	31	(Germany) Sascha Hommel	Malaguti		Did not start		
DNQ	85	(China) Zhou You Rao	Honda		Did not qualify		

== Championship standings after the race (MotoGP) ==
Below are the standings for the top five riders and constructors after round three has concluded.

Riders' Championship standings

Pos.	Rider	Points
1	(Italy) Valentino Rossi	70
2	(Italy) Marco Melandri	45
3	(Brazil) Alex Barros	43
4	(Italy) Max Biaggi	36
5	(Spain) Sete Gibernau	33

Constructors' Championship standings

Pos.	Constructor	Points
1	(Japan) Yamaha	70
2	(Japan) Honda	61
3	(Japan) Kawasaki	39
4	(Italy) Ducati	21
5	(Japan) Suzuki	15

- Note: Only the top five positions are included for both sets of standings.

== Notes ==
This is the last race where no Spanish riders managed to get on the podium in all classes until the 2015 Qatar Grand Prix.

Previous race: 2005 Portuguese Grand Prix	FIM Grand Prix World Championship; 2005 season	Next race: 2005 French Grand Prix
Previous race: None	Chinese motorcycle Grand Prix	Next race: 2006 Chinese Grand Prix
