= Yuki Takahashi =

Japanese motorcycle racer

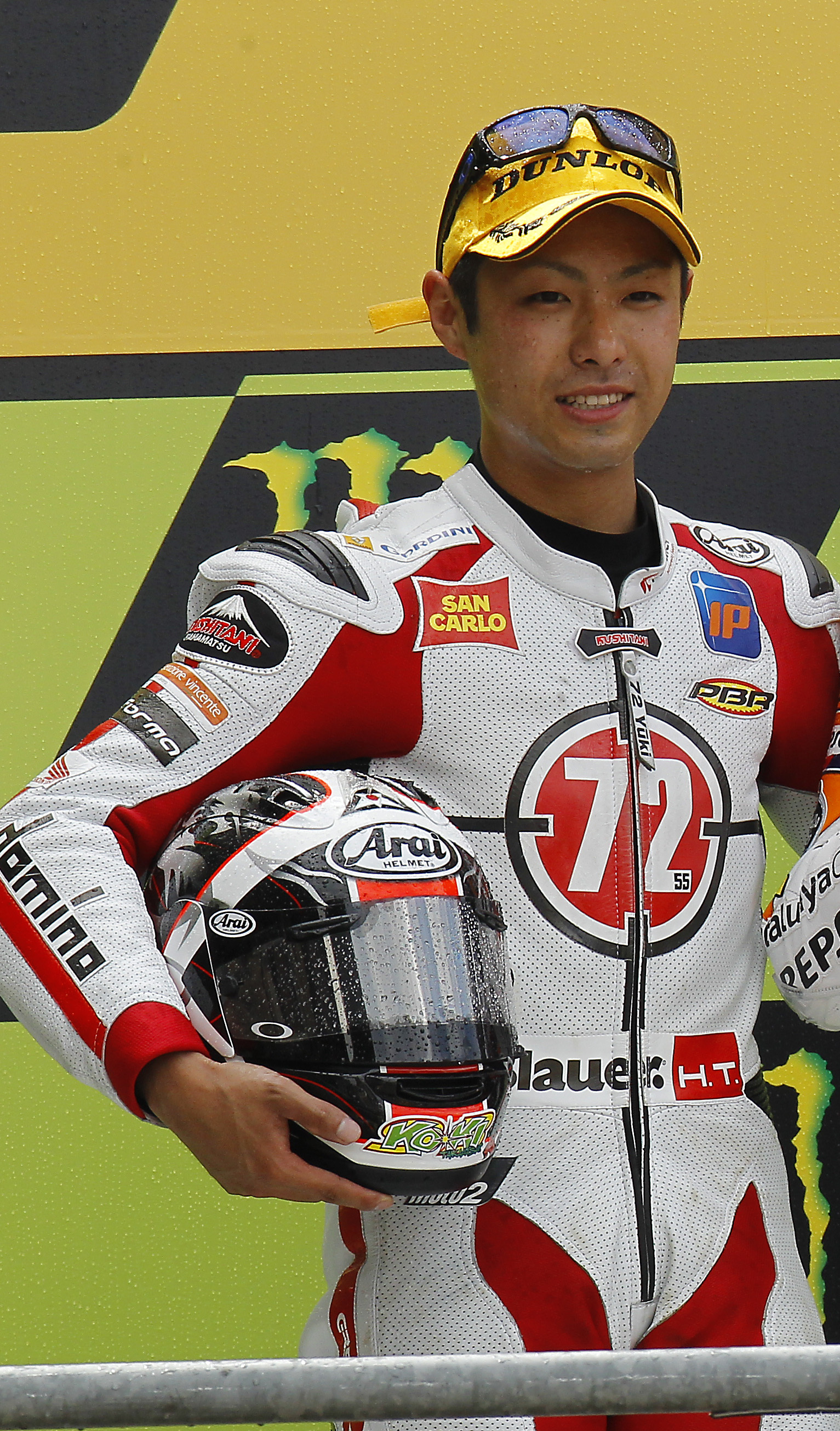
- Takahashi at the 2011 French Grand Prix
- Nationality: Japanese
- Born: July 12, 1984 (age 42); Saitama, Japan
- Current team: F.C.C. TSR Honda France (EWC)
- Bike number: 5
Motorcycle racing career statistics
MotoGP World Championship
Active years	2009
Manufacturers	Honda
Championships	0
2009 championship position	21st (9 pts)
Starts / Wins / Podiums / Poles / F. laps / Points; 7 / 0 / 0 / 0 / 0 / 9
Moto2 World Championship
Active years	2010–2015
Manufacturers	Tech 3, Moriwaki, Suter, FTR
Championships	0
2015 championship position	27th (2 pts)
Starts / Wins / Podiums / Poles / F. laps / Points; 64 / 1 / 4 / 0 / 0 / 170
250cc World Championship
Active years	2002–2008
Manufacturers	Honda
Championships	0
2008 championship position	5th (167 pts)
Starts / Wins / Podiums / Poles / F. laps / Points; 65 / 2 / 7 / 0 / 0 / 546
125cc World Championship
Active years	2001
Manufacturers	Honda
Championships	0
2001 championship position	NC (0 pts)
Starts / Wins / Podiums / Poles / F. laps / Points; 1 / 0 / 0 / 0 / 0 / 0

Yuki Takahashi (高橋 裕紀, Takahashi Yūki; born July 12, 1984) is a Japanese Grand Prix motorcycle road racer. He currently races in the All Japan Road Race JSB1000 Championship aboard a Honda CBR1000RR.

For 2009 he made his debut in the MotoGP class, with the Scot Racing Honda team but was subsequently dropped by the team after just seven rounds of the 2009 season due to financial issues. Until that point, he had spent his entire career with Honda.

== Career ==
=== Early career ===
Born in Saitama, Saitama, Takahashi developed his talents through an HRC Racing Scholarship, a program which has supported many young Japanese riders and aims to help them into the top level of competition. He made a wild card appearance in the 125cc World Championship in Japan in 2001. Between 2002 and 2004, he made four wild card appearances in his home country in the 250cc World Championship, finishing in the top-five in all four. He won the MFJ All Japan Road Race GP250 Championship in 2004, having previously finished runner-up in the MFJ All Japan Road Race GP125 Championship in 2001.

=== 250cc World Championship ===
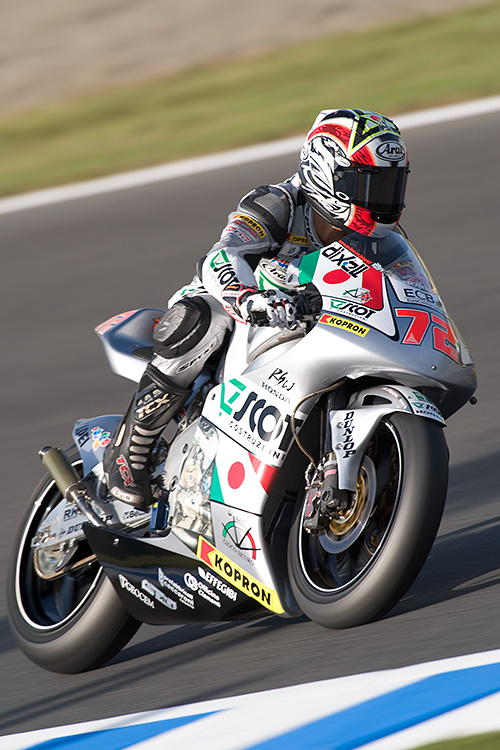
Takahashi at the 2008 Japanese Grand Prix, riding a Honda.

Takahashi became a full-time 250cc World Championship rider in 2005, finishing eleventh overall on a Honda. For 2006 and beyond Honda did not develop their 250cc two-stroke racing machine, but Takahashi was still able to take two wins and sixth overall. He came eleventh overall without a podium in 2007 as the team began to struggle, but in 2008 he took three podium finishes, and qualified eighth and finished sixth in his home race. In his final 250cc appearance at Valencia he qualified tenth, but rode well, finishing second. He ended up in fifth place in the final standings: his best performance since starting to compete in the World Championship.

=== MotoGP World Championship ===
For the 2009 season, Takahashi was handed a MotoGP spot for Team Scot Honda, thus replacing his former 250cc team-mate Andrea Dovizioso who headed for HRC's official Repsol Honda outfit. After the JiR Team Scot team split, JiR attempted to remain in the class with Ben Spies, but Honda opted to support Team Scot instead. Takahashi struggled early in the season, with a best finish of 12th at the Circuit de Catalunya. He crashed on the first lap there, and also had an early collision with Nicky Hayden on his home round.

On 1 July 2009, it was announced that the Scot Honda team would be terminating Takahashi's contract with immediate effect due to financial constraints. He was replaced by Hungarian rider Gábor Talmácsi. It marked the first time since 1991 that no Japanese rider was competing in the premier category.

=== Moto2 World Championship ===
Takahashi has dropped down into the new Moto2 class for 2010, partnering Raffaele de Rosa at Tech 3. He took his first victory in the class at Barcelona, after a ride-through penalty for Andrea Iannone. He finished the season 12th overall. For 2011, he signed to ride for Gresini Racing aboard a Moriwaki, where he took two podium finishes and finished 11th overall. For 2012, he joined NGM Mobile Forward Racing and rode a Suter for the first six rounds and a FTR for the remainder of the championship, the season was a disaster as Takahashi only failed to score points until the final round of the season at Valencia. He remained in Moto2 for 2013 and joined IDEMITSU Honda Team Asia, ran by Tadayuki Okada and rode a Moriwaki once again. Takahashi was dropped in favour of Azlan Shah Kamaruzaman for the Misano round onwards after failing to score a point in the opening 11 rounds.

== Career statistics ==
=== Grand Prix motorcycle racing ===
==== By season ====
Season	Class	Motorcycle	Team	Race	Win	Podium	Pole	FLap	Pts	Plcd
2001	125cc	Honda	OSL SC & Okegawa School	1	0	0	0	0	0	NC
2002	250cc	Honda	Team HRC	1	0	1	0	0	16	21st
2003	250cc	Honda	Dy Do Miu Racing Team	2	0	1	0	0	29	18th
2004	250cc	Honda	Dydo Miu Racing	1	0	0	0	0	11	25th
2005	250cc	Honda	Team Scot	16	0	0	0	0	77	11th
2006	250cc	Honda	Humangest Racing Team	14	2	2	0	0	156	6th
2007	250cc	Honda	Kopron Team Scot	15	0	0	0	0	90	11th
2008	250cc	Honda	JiR Team Scot 250	16	0	3	0	0	167	5th
2009	MotoGP	Honda	Scot Racing Team MotoGP	7	0	0	0	0	9	21st
2010	Moto2	Tech 3	Tech 3 Racing	17	1	2	0	0	86	12th
2011	Moto2	Moriwaki	Gresini Racing	17	0	2	0	0	77	11th
2012	Moto2	Suter	Forward Racing	17	0	0	0	0	5	28th
2012	Moto2	FTR	Forward Racing	17	0	0	0	0	5	28th
2013	Moto2	Moriwaki	IDEMITSU Honda Team Asia	11	0	0	0	0	0	NC
2014	Moto2	Moriwaki	Moriwaki Racing	1	0	0	0	0	0	NC
2015	Moto2	Moriwaki	Moriwaki Racing	1	0	0	0	0	2	27th
Total				**137**	**3**	**11**	**0**	**0**	**725**	

==== By class ====
Class	Seasons	1st GP	1st Pod	1st Win	Race	Win	Podiums	Pole	FLap	Pts	WChmp
125cc	2001	2001 Pacific			1	0	0	0	0	0	0
250cc	2002–2008	2002 Pacific	2002 Pacific	2006 France	65	2	7	0	0	546	0
MotoGP	2009	2009 Qatar			7	0	0	0	0	9	0
Moto2	2010–2015	2010 Qatar	2010 Catalunya	2010 Catalunya	64	1	4	0	0	170	0
Total	2002–2015				**137**	**3**	**11**	**0**	**0**	**725**	

==== Races by year ====
(key) (Races in bold indicate pole position; races in italics indicate fastest lap)

Year	Class	Bike	1	2	3	4	5	6	7	8	9	10	11	12	13	14	15	16	17	18	Pos	Pts
2001	125cc	Honda	JPN	RSA	SPA	FRA	ITA	CAT	NED	GBR	GER	CZE	POR	VAL	PAC; Ret	AUS	MAL	BRA			NC	0
2002	250cc	Honda	JPN	RSA	SPA	FRA	ITA	CAT	NED	GBR	GER	CZE	POR	BRA	PAC; 3	MAL	AUS	VAL			21st	16
2003	250cc	Honda	JPN; 3	RSA	SPA	FRA	ITA	CAT	NED	GBR	GER	CZE	POR	BRA	PAC; 4	MAL	AUS	VAL			18th	29
2004	250cc	Honda	RSA	SPA	FRA	ITA	CAT	NED	BRA	GER	GBR	CZE	POR	JPN; 5	QAT	MAL	AUS	VAL			25th	11
2005	250cc	Honda	SPA; Ret	POR; 7	CHN; 10	FRA; 10	ITA; Ret	CAT; 7	NED; 15	GBR; Ret	GER; 9	CZE; Ret	JPN; 4	MAL; 7	QAT; 8	AUS; Ret	TUR; Ret	VAL; 7			11th	77
2006	250cc	Honda	SPA; 4	QAT; 9	TUR; 5	CHN; 5	FRA; 1	ITA; 4	CAT; 7	NED; 6	GBR; 7	GER; 1	CZE	MAL; 4	AUS; Ret	JPN; Ret	POR; 6	VAL; DNS			6th	156
2007	250cc	Honda	QAT; 7	SPA; 8	TUR; Ret	CHN; DNS	FRA	ITA; 11	CAT; Ret	GBR; 4	NED; 10	GER; 8	CZE; Ret	RSM; 9	POR; Ret	JPN; 4	AUS; 10	MAL; 9	VAL; 8		11th	90
2008	250cc	Honda	QAT; 5	SPA; 3	POR; 6	CHN; 7	FRA; 4	ITA; Ret	CAT; 12	GBR; 9	NED; 8	GER; 9	CZE; 6	RSM; 2	INP; C	JPN; 6	AUS; 7	MAL; 4	VAL; 2		5th	167
2009	MotoGP	Honda	QAT; 15	JPN; Ret	SPA; 12	FRA; 13	ITA; Ret	CAT; Ret	NED; 15	USA	GER	GBR	CZE	INP	RSM	POR	AUS	MAL	VAL		21st	9
2010	Moto2	Tech 3	QAT; Ret	SPA; 4	FRA; Ret	ITA; 8	GBR; 18	NED; 10	CAT; 1	GER; Ret	CZE; 2	INP; 26	RSM; Ret	ARA; 12	JPN; 6	MAL; Ret	AUS; 17	POR; 26	VAL; 18		12th	86
2011	Moto2	Moriwaki	QAT; 5	SPA; Ret	POR; 3	FRA; 2	CAT; Ret	GBR; 7	NED; Ret	ITA; 14	GER; Ret	CZE; 12	INP; 25	RSM; 7	ARA; 31	JPN; 30	AUS; 10	MAL; Ret	VAL; Ret		11th	77
2012	Moto2	Suter	QAT; 19	SPA; 21	POR; Ret	FRA; 17	CAT; 21	GBR; 25													28th	5
2012	Moto2	FTR							NED; 20	GER; Ret	ITA; 17	INP; 27	CZE; 18	RSM; Ret	ARA; 22	JPN; 15	MAL; 15	AUS; 15	VAL; 14		28th	5
2013	Moto2	Moriwaki	QAT; 23	AME; 18	SPA; 22	FRA; 17	ITA; 23	CAT; 20	NED; 25	GER; 18	INP; 21	CZE; 17	GBR; 22	RSM	ARA	MAL	AUS	JPN	VAL		NC	0
2014	Moto2	Moriwaki	QAT	AME	ARG	SPA	FRA	ITA	CAT	NED	GER	INP	CZE	GBR	RSM	ARA	JPN; 26	AUS	MAL	VAL	NC	0
2015	Moto2	Moriwaki	QAT	AME	ARG	SPA	FRA	ITA	CAT	NED	GER	INP	CZE	GBR	RSM	ARA	JPN; 14	AUS	MAL	VAL	27th	2
