= Héctor Faubel =

Spanish motorcycle racer

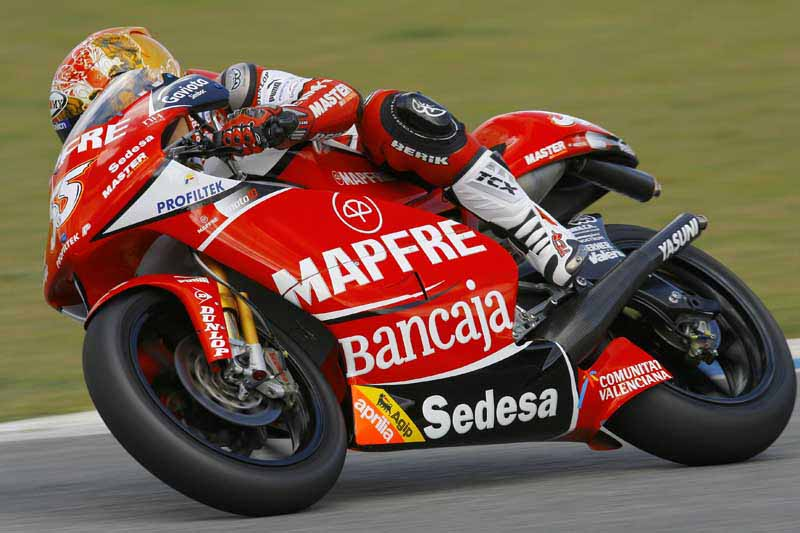
- Faubel in 2008.
- Nationality: Spanish
- Born: 10 August 1983 (age 43); Llíria (Spain)
Motorcycle racing career statistics
Moto2 World Championship
| Active years | 2010 |
| Manufacturers | Suter-Honda |
| Championships | 0 |
| 2010 championship position | 26th (18 pts) |
Starts / Wins / Podiums / Poles / F. laps / Points; 17 / 0 / 0 / 0 / 0 / 18
Moto3 World Championship
| Active years | 2012 |
| Manufacturers | Kalex KTM, FTR Honda |
| Championships | 0 |
| 2012 championship position | 16th (63 pts) |
Starts / Wins / Podiums / Poles / F. laps / Points; 12 / 0 / 0 / 0 / 0 / 63
250cc World Championship
| Active years | 2002–2004, 2008–2009 |
| Manufacturers | Aprilia, Honda |
| Championships | 0 |
| 2009 championship position | 9th (105 pts) |
Starts / Wins / Podiums / Poles / F. laps / Points; 78 / 0 / 1 / 0 / 0 / 248
125cc World Championship
| Active years | 2000–2001, 2005–2007, 2011 |
| Manufacturers | Aprilia |
| Championships | 0 |
| 2011 championship position | 5th (177 pts) |
Starts / Wins / Podiums / Poles / F. laps / Points; 70 / 8 / 25 / 3 / 9 / 764

Héctor Faubel Rojí (born 10 August 1983, in Llíria, Valencia, Spain) is a former professional motorcycle road racer. He was the Spanish 250cc Champion in 2002.

== Career ==
Faubel has been racing full-time since 2002, always on Aprilia bikes. After finishing 2006 strongly he was considered a favourite for the 2007 125cc title, during which he battled with eventual world champion Gábor Talmácsi. For 2008, he moved up to the 250cc class. However; his 2008 season was a disappointment, as Faubel could do no better than a 14th place overall, while teammate Álvaro Bautista was Championship runner-up.

For 2009, Faubel left the Aspar team and moved to the Honda SAG Team with the sponsorship of Valencia CF. In a season marked by the economic difficulties of the moment (in the midst of an economic crisis) that made the means available to both the team and the pilot are rather scarce. Even so, the season was not bad for Faubel who arrived on the podium (second) in Le Mans and finished the year in ninth position, signing the best season in 250cc for both him and the team he was riding for.

In 2010, the first season of the new Moto2 category, was a mystery for the whole grid. A dozen brands were running with different chassis to compete for being champions in the first season of the Moto2. Faubel meanwhile dragged the problems of the previous year and only a week before he managed to gain a foothold in the Marc VDS Racing Team led by Michael Bartholemy.

Faubel only managed to finish four races in the points, so he finished the World Championship in 26th position, having to retire in several races.

For 2011, Faubel returned to the 125cc category, again with the Aspar Team. Faubel returned to the podium in several Grands prix, and even manages to re-savor a victory at the German GP, with the anecdote that the Frenchman Johann Zarco entered on a par with him, but when Faubel did fast return in less time than the Derbi rider, the commissioners awarded him the victory.

To the following season, 2012, the 125cc category was denominated to Moto3, with the corresponding changes in the regulation.

Faubel failed to match the results of the previous season, and in addition to Bankia's lack of sponsorship in the Aspar team they decide to replace him with Luca Amato from the Aragon GP.

Faubel participated in the last Grand Prix of the season, the Valencia GP, in the Andalucía-JHK Laglisse team, to whom his teammate from season's beginning, Alberto Moncayo, also had jump over mid season in favor of Amato's compatriot Jonas Folger, from the season's piloting an FTR and finishing in fifth position, improving any other result obtained that same season.

== Grand Prix motorcycle racing career ==
=== By season ===
| Season | Class | Motorcycle | Team | Number | Races | Win | Podiums | Pole | Pts | Position |
|---|---|---|---|---|---|---|---|---|---|---|
| 2000 | 125cc | Aprilia | CC Valencia Airtel Aspar | 44 | 2 | 0 | 0 | 0 | 0 | NC |
| 2001 | 125cc | Aprilia | Valencia Circuit Aspar Team | 44 | 2 | 0 | 0 | 0 | 0 | NC |
| 2002 | 250cc | Aprilia | RFME Equipo Nacional | 32 | 16 | 0 | 0 | 0 | 14 | 23rd |
| 2003 | 250cc | Aprilia | Aspar Junior Team | 33 | 16 | 0 | 0 | 0 | 34 | 13th |
| 2004 | 250cc | Aprilia | Grefusa - Aspar Team 250cc | 33 | 14 | 0 | 0 | 0 | 31 | 17th |
| 2005 | 125cc | Aprilia | Master Aspar | 55 | 16 | 0 | 3 | 0 | 113 | 9th |
| 2006 | 125cc | Aprilia | Master - MVA Aspar Team | 55 | 16 | 2 | 5 | 0 | 197 | **3rd** |
| 2007 | 125cc | Aprilia | Bancaja Aspar | 55 | 17 | 5 | 13 | 2 | 277 | **2nd** |
| 2008 | 250cc | Aprilia | Mapfre Aspar Team | 55 | 16 | 0 | 0 | 0 | 64 | 14th |
| 2009 | 250cc | Honda | Honda SAG | 55 | 16 | 0 | 1 | 0 | 105 | 9th |
| 2010 | Moto2 | Suter | Marc VDS Racing Team | 55 | 17 | 0 | 0 | 0 | 18 | 26th |
| 2011 | 125cc | Aprilia | Bankia Aspar Team 125cc | 55 | 17 | 1 | 4 | 1 | 177 | 5th |
| 2012 | Moto3 | Kalex KTM | Bankia Aspar Team | 55 | 12 | 0 | 0 | 0 | 63 | 16th |
| 2012 | Moto3 | FTR Honda | Andalucia JHK Laglisse | 55 | 12 | 0 | 0 | 0 | 63 | 16th |
| Total | | | | | **177** | **8** | **26** | **3** | **1093** | |

=== Races by year ===
(key) (Races in bold indicate pole position)

| Year | Class | Bike | 1 | 2 | 3 | 4 | 5 | 6 | 7 | 8 | 9 | 10 | 11 | 12 | 13 | 14 | 15 | 16 | 17 | Pos. | Pts |
|---|---|---|---|---|---|---|---|---|---|---|---|---|---|---|---|---|---|---|---|---|---|
| 2000 | 125cc | Aprilia | RSA | MAL | JPN | SPA; 22 | FRA | ITA | CAT | NED | GBR | GER | CZE | POR | VAL; 19 | BRA | PAC | AUS | | NC | 0 |
| 2001 | 125cc | Aprilia | JPN | RSA | SPA; 16 | FRA | ITA | CAT | NED | GBR | GER | CZE | POR | VAL; Ret | PAC | AUS | MAL | BRA | | NC | 0 |
| 2002 | 250cc | Aprilia | JPN; Ret | RSA; Ret | SPA; 11 | FRA; 14 | ITA; 16 | CAT; 20 | NED; Ret | GBR; 20 | GER; 18 | CZE; Ret | POR; 10 | BRA; 17 | PAC; 22 | MAL; Ret | AUS; 19 | VAL; 15 | | 23rd | 14 |
| 2003 | 250cc | Aprilia | JPN; Ret | RSA; 11 | SPA; Ret | FRA; 11 | ITA; 15 | CAT; Ret | NED; 17 | GBR; 20 | GER; 18 | CZE; Ret | POR; 13 | BRA; 6 | PAC; Ret | MAL; Ret | AUS; 16 | VAL; Ret | | 13th | 34 |
| 2004 | 250cc | Aprilia | RSA; 12 | SPA; 17 | FRA; 13 | ITA; 14 | CAT; 16 | NED; 17 | BRA; DNS | GER | GBR; DSQ | CZE; 10 | POR; 11 | JPN; 15 | QAT; Ret | MAL; 13 | AUS; 16 | VAL; 9 | | 17th | 31 |
| 2005 | 125cc | Aprilia | SPA; 7 | POR; 2 | CHN; 15 | FRA; Ret | ITA; Ret | CAT; Ret | NED; 2 | GBR; Ret | GER; Ret | CZE; Ret | JPN; 3 | MAL; 4 | QAT; 5 | AUS; 6 | TUR; Ret | VAL; 4 | | 9th | 113 |
| 2006 | 125cc | Aprilia | SPA; 6 | QAT; 6 | TUR; 1 | CHN; 7 | FRA; 14 | ITA; 5 | CAT; 2 | NED; 6 | GBR; 4 | GER; 4 | CZE; Ret | MAL; 3 | AUS; 13 | JPN; 6 | POR; 2 | VAL; 1 | | **3rd** | **197** |
| 2007 | 125cc | Aprilia | QAT; 1 | SPA; 3 | TUR; 10 | CHN; 2 | FRA; 6 | **ITA**; 1 | CAT; Ret | GBR; 3 | NED; 2 | GER; 3 | CZE; 1 | RSM; 17 | POR; 1 | JPN; 3 | AUS; 3 | **MAL**; 3 | VAL; 1 | **2nd** | **277** |
| 2008 | 250cc | Aprilia | QAT; 10 | SPA; Ret | POR; 9 | CHN; 10 | FRA; 10 | ITA; Ret | CAT; 8 | GBR; 15 | NED; 11 | GER; 14 | CZE; 8 | RSM; Ret | INP; C | JPN; 11 | AUS; Ret | MAL; Ret | VAL; 6 | 14th | 64 |
| 2009 | 250cc | Honda | QAT; 11 | JPN; Ret | SPA; 14 | FRA; 2 | ITA; 8 | CAT; 10 | NED; 8 | GER; 6 | GBR; 10 | CZE; 10 | INP; 8 | RSM; 9 | POR; Ret | AUS; 8 | MAL; 5 | VAL; Ret | | 9th | 105 |
| 2010 | Moto2 | Suter | QAT; 22 | SPA; Ret | FRA; Ret | ITA; 12 | GBR; Ret | NED; 25 | CAT; Ret | GER; 25 | CZE; 12 | INP; Ret | RSM; 16 | ARA; 17 | JPN; 30 | MAL; 11 | AUS; Ret | POR; 11 | VAL; 21 | 26th | 18 |
| 2011 | 125cc | Aprilia | QAT; 11 | SPA; 11 | POR; Ret | FRA; 4 | CAT; 7 | GBR; 3 | NED; 10 | ITA; 5 | GER; 1 | CZE; 4 | INP; 7 | RSM; 5 | **ARA**; Ret | JPN; 3 | AUS; 7 | MAL; 4 | VAL; 3 | 5th | 177 |
| 2012 | Moto3 | Kalex KTM | QAT; 12 | SPA; 9 | POR; 12 | FRA; Ret | CAT; 7 | GBR; 12 | NED; 15 | GER; 7 | ITA; 10 | INP; DNS | CZE; 11 | RSM; 13 | ARA | JPN | MAL | AUS | | 16th | 63 |
| 2012 | Moto3 | FTR Honda | | | | | | | | | | | | | | | | | VAL; 5 | 16th | 63 |
