= Gábor Talmácsi =

Hungarian motorcycle racer (born 1981)

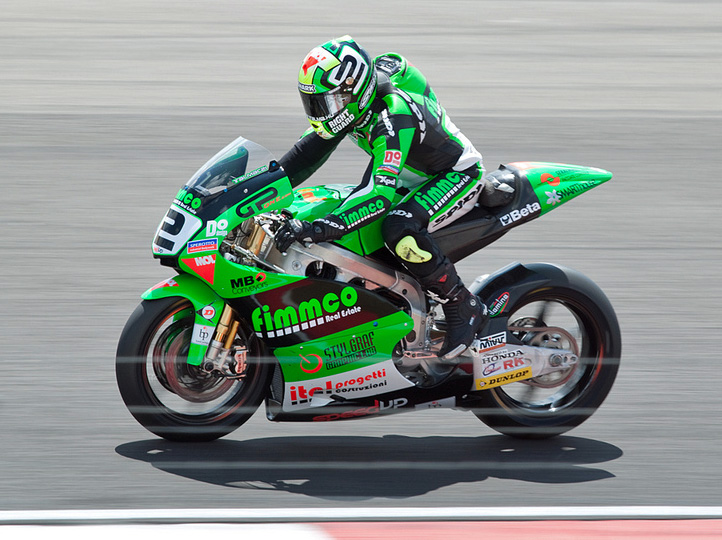
- Talmácsi at the 2010 Dutch TT
- Nationality: Hungarian
- Born: 28 May 1981 (age 45); Budapest, Hungary
Motorcycle racing career statistics
MotoGP World Championship
Active years	2009
Manufacturers	Honda
Championships	0
2009 championship position	17th (19 pts)
Starts / Wins / Podiums / Poles / F. laps / Points; 12 / 0 / 0 / 0 / 0 / 19
Moto2 World Championship
Active years	2010
Manufacturers	Speed Up
Championships	0
2010 championship position	6th (109 pts)
Starts / Wins / Podiums / Poles / F. laps / Points; 17 / 0 / 1 / 1 / 0 / 109
250cc World Championship
Active years	2009
Manufacturers	Aprilia
Championships	0
2009 championship position	18th (28 pts)
Starts / Wins / Podiums / Poles / F. laps / Points; 3 / 0 / 0 / 0 / 0 / 28
125cc World Championship
Active years	2000–2008
Manufacturers	Honda, Italjet, Aprilia, KTM, Malaguti
Championships	1 (2007)
2008 championship position	3rd (206 pts)
Starts / Wins / Podiums / Poles / F. laps / Points; 130 / 9 / 25 / 10 / 9 / 972
Supersport World Championship
Active years	2012–2013
Manufacturers	Honda
Championships	0
2013 championship position	27th (4 pts)
Starts / Wins / Podiums / Poles / F. laps / Points; 13 / 0 / 0 / 0 / 0 / 48

Gábor Talmácsi (born 28 May 1981 in Budapest, Hungary) is a Hungarian former professional motorcycle racer. He was the 2007 125cc World Champion, and he is the first and only Hungarian to win a road racing World Championship.

Talmácsi has a younger brother, Gergő, who is also a motorcycle racer. Due to a leg injury suffered in 2013, Talmácsi has retired from racing professionally. After retiring from racing, he set up his own team Talmácsi Racing, which competed in the European Superstock 600 Championship and raced with Honda CBR600RRs, until the series folded at the end of 2015.

== Career ==
=== Early career ===
Talmácsi also competed in boxing, but started racing on minibikes made by his father at the age of four. In the 1995 Hungarian 125cc national championships, he finished in second, and in 1996, he won the title, opening the doors for not just national, but international championships as well. In 1997, he competed in the European 125cc Championship, finishing the race held at the Hungaroring in fourth place, attracting further attention. He continued in the series in 1998, without further success, and switched to the Alps Adriatic Championship in 1999, winning a race in the championship. In 2000, he raced again in the European Championship, and was sponsored the German IVETRA team, which allowed him to ride for a team with a better bike, and Talmácsi delivered the results. With several podium finishes in the year, and finishing the season fifth in the rider's championship, Talmácsi was able to gain enough sponsors to compete in Grand Prix racing from next season onwards.

=== 125cc World Championship (2001-2008) ===
==== Racing Service Team (2001) ====
Talmácsi had his first full Grand Prix season in 2001, with the Racing Service team, on a private Honda RS125R bike. He started the year with four non-point scoring finishes, but improved as the season went on, eventually finishing in the points six times, three times in the top-ten, with his season's best being a sixth place in Motegi. He ended the year 18th overall with 34 points, which earned him a place on the Italjet team for next season.

==== Italjet / PEV ADAC Sachsen Team (2002) ====
The change wasn't a real success with no points in five races, and during the 2002 season, Talmácsi switched to the PEV ADAC Sachsen team, where he could ride a Honda again. This lineup worked a bit better, as he would score a 15th place in Assen, a 15th place in Valencia, an 11th place in Brno, and his best result in the category yet, with a brilliant fourth place in Brazil. He ended the year 22nd in the rider's championship, with 20 points.

==== Exalt Cycle Aprilia Team (2003) ====
In 2003, Talmácsi signed for the reigning world champion Exalt Cycle Aprilia team, to partner teammate Steve Jenkner. Although not challenging for wins like his teammate, Talmácsi still had a much improved year, with consistent top-ten finishes (seven times), and a career high 70 points in the championship, which was good enough for 14th overall.

==== Malaguti (2004) ====
Talmácsi joined the factory Malaguti team for the 2004 season, wishing to be the leading rider at a team. However, the bike was not competitive at all, and his teammate Manuel Manna failed to score a single point during the season. Talmácsi fared better, scoring two 13th places in Mugello and Donnington, an 11th place at Phillip Island, a ninth place in Valencia, two eighth places in Motegi and Sepang, and a seventh place in Estoril. He finished 17th in the championship with 43 points, and his results with a weaker bike attracted the attention of teams like Derbi, Gilera, Honda and KTM.

==== KTM (2005) ====
Joining the Red Bull KTM team for 2005 gave Talmácsi the real breakthrough year, scoring his career's maiden podium in the third race of the season at Shanghai. Two races later in Mugello, he inherited his first victory, after a last lap fall from KTM teammate Mika Kallio and Héctor Faubel saw him cross the finish line first. A fourth place in Catalonia was followed by another victory in Assen, and a fourth place in Germany. Talmácsi won his third race in Qatar, which became infamous for his last lap overtaking of his teammate Mika Kallio. With four races to go, the Finn still had a real chance to beat Thomas Lüthi for the title, and Talmácsi only had mathematical chance, so the team asked the Hungarian rider to help his teammate score as many points as possible. After safely following him during the entire race, on the last lap Talmácsi overtook Kallio, and later claimed at the post race press conference, that he thought they still had one more lap to go. He had already been offered a contract by the manufacturer to race their factory 250cc KTM bike the forthcoming season, but after this incident the offer was withdrawn, giving the bikes to Manuel Poggiali and Hiroshi Aoyama instead. This incident became all the more painful for Kallio, after he was beaten by Lüthi in the title fight by only five points: the exact difference in the championship points gained by the first place and second place riders. Lüthi finished the season with 242 points and four wins, Kallio with 237 points and also four wins, but would have been five if not for the last second overtake in Qatar, thus winning the championship by more victories during countback. Talmácsi finished the season third in the standings, with 198 points, three wins, one second place, one third place, and was not given a new contract by KTM.

==== Humangest Honda Racing Team (2006) ====
Inspired by the fact that the last three world champions in the class all rode Hondas, Talmácsi accepted the offer of the Humangest Honda team, to ride a fully factory bike. But the Japanese manufacturer barely developed their 125cc bike for the new season following Lüthi's championship the year prior, so Aprilia had a big competitive advantage, which could be seen in the season's results. Álvaro Bautista became world champion easily, beating Kallio on the KTM by 76 points, and his own Aprilia teammates by 146 points. Talmácsi managed a season's best finish of third in Brno, the closest race to a "home" Grand Prix, but that was the most he could get out of his bike. He finished the season seventh overall with 119 points, and as the best Honda rider, scoring six points more than 2005's champion and fellow Honda rider Lüthi.

==== World Champion at Aspar Aprilia (2007) ====
Coming into his seventh season of the 125cc category, Talmácsi was given an offer from Jorge "Aspar" Martínez's team to ride one of their bikes in 2007, replacing outgoing world champion Bautista. Team Aspar was arguably the best team in the class, they gave the world champion in 2006, and also won the teams' competition. Talmácsi raced with a previously developed Aprilia engine, the so-called RSW, while his Spanish teammates, Héctor Faubel and Sergio Gadea used the new RSA engine, which proved to be a bit faster but less reliable than the older one. Mattia Pasini's 2007 season demonstrated the low reliability of the engine, with his motor problems forcing him to retire from five of the first seven races at the beginning of the season. This may have cost him the world championship title, because later with the engine upgrade, he showed great competitiveness, scoring four wins.

The season started very positively for Talmácsi. After a successful testing period, he started with a second place in the opening race of Qatar, then he won the race in Jerez, overtaking Lukáš Pešek of Derbi just before the finish line. In the third race held at Istanbul Park Circuit, he ended fifth after a small incident with Raffaele de Rosa, but increased his lead in the World Championship, due to his opponents finishing behind him (Héctor Faubel suffered from a clash with de Rosa and finished in tenth due to an overly aggressive maneuver from the Italian, Pesek finished in sixth, while Gadea and Pasini both retired). On his 100th GP race in Shanghai, he finished fourth, a result he would repeat in both Le Mans, and Mugello. This cost him the championship lead, with Lukáš Pešek grabbing his maiden win in China, and finishing second in France. In Barcelona, his two main rivals at the time, Faubel and Pešek, crashed into each other while Talmácsi finished second, again leading the world championship by 13 points. In the next grand prix at Donington, he could not finish the race due to an engine issue, and had to retire from the race, the only race he did not finish during the season. In Assen, he finished third behind Mattia Pasini and Héctor Faubel.

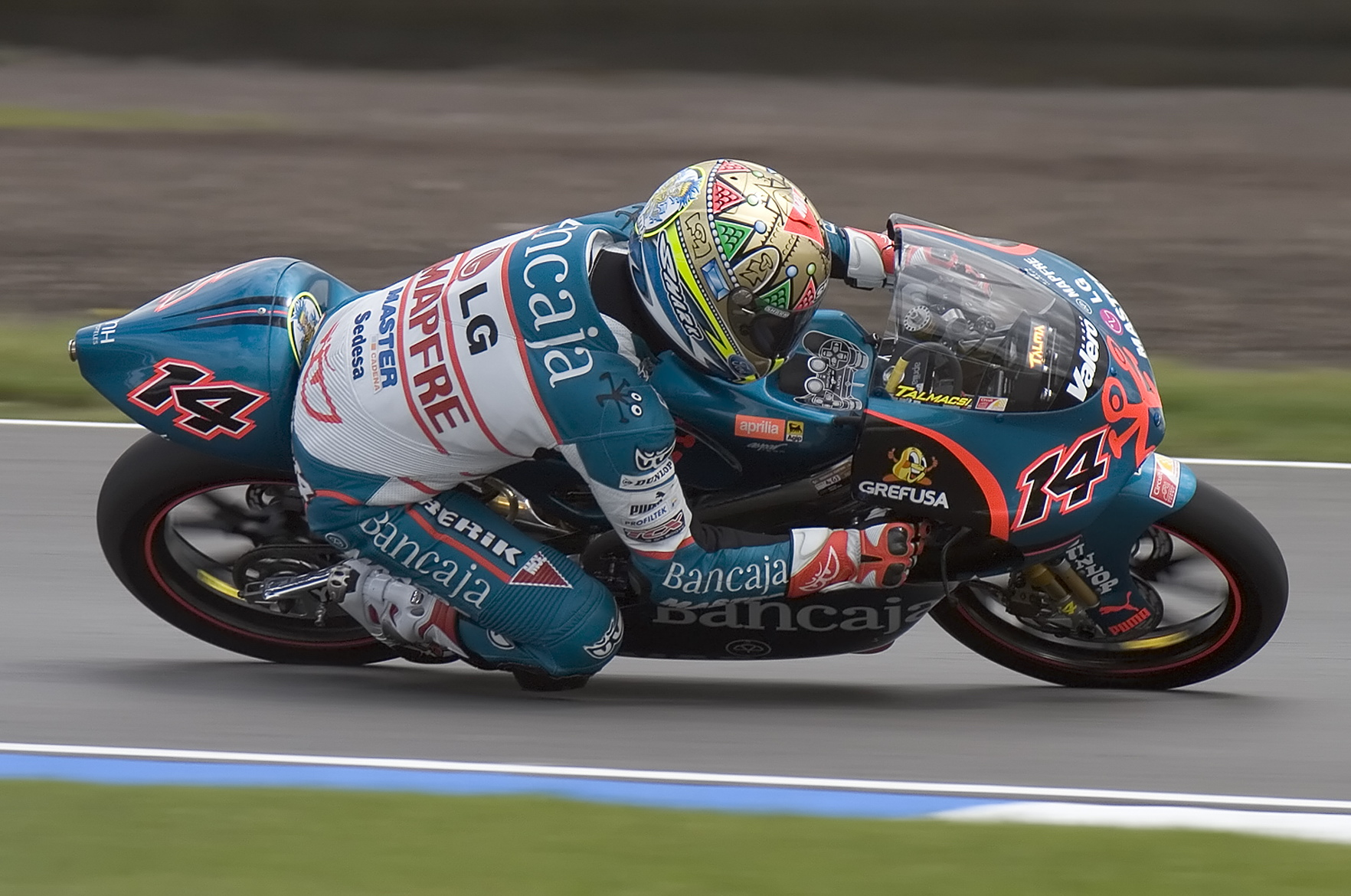
Talmácsi riding an Aprilia during second qualifying at the 2007 British GP at Donington Park

The German GP at the Sachsenring was the race most dominantly won by Talmácsi in 2007, with pole position, fastest lap of the race, and a formidable advantage throughout the whole grand prix. In Brno, there were about 30,000 Hungarian supporters traveling to see him win, and his performance appeared to be quite dominant with a pole position on Saturday, however in the race he could not ride as fast as expected, and had many tough battles further slowing him down, in the end finishing the race in fourth place, while Faubel won. The race at Misano was a dramatic one, as in the penultimate lap of the race Simone Corsi, Héctor Faubel and Gábor Talmácsi were all battling for second place, the race was led comfortably by Mattia Pasini. Corsi and Faubel crashed, while Talmácsi could keep going and finished the race in second place, again leading the championship before Faubel, who did not score any points, finishing the race in 17th place. The race in Estoril was another dramatic race, with Héctor Faubel taking the victory, overtaking Talmácsi after the last corner, in his slipstream. In Motegi, the race was held in wet conditions, and was won by Pasini, with Talmácsi coming in second, and Faubel in third.

With three races remaining, Talmácsi had his worst race of the season (besides the United Kingdom where his engine problem impeded him from finishing), in Australia, where he had problems with finding the right setup for the new suspension of his motorcycle. He finished in eighth place, and kept only a single point of his lead against Héctor Faubel, who finished in third behind Lukáš Pešek and Joan Olivé. At Sepang, the penultimate race of the season, Faubel had pole position with Talmácsi starting second. Getting a better start and having better pace throughout the whole race, the Hungarian rider lead from the end of the first lap until the end of the race, with a significant advantage over the other riders. Faubel finished third, Japanese KTM rider Tomoyoshi Koyama coming in second. The last race of the season at Valencia saw Talmácsi come into the weekend with a ten-point advantage, and needed to finish on the podium if Faubel won. Talmácsi started from pole, and in an absolutely tense race where Faubel tried everything, including backing them up into fellow Spanish Aspar Aprilia rider Sergio Gadea, but Talmácsi hung on to second place (third still would have been enough by one point if Gadea passed him), finishing just behind his rival race-winner Faubel, and became the 2007 125cc World Champion. He became the first motorcycle World Champion of Hungary, and the first from the central-eastern region of Europe. The party to celebrate his success back in Budapest, Hungary was known as "Talmageddon", a word play between Talmácsi and Armageddon, and was also named 2007 Hungarian Sportsman of the Year for his achievements.

==== Bancaja Aspar Team Aprilia (2008) ====
Talmácsi signed a two-year contract with the Aspar Team, to race in their 125cc team in 2008 with an RSA Aprilia motorcycle, and move to the 250cc team of Jorge "Aspar" Martínez in 2009. 2008 did not start well for him, with a 12th place in Qatar, and a retirement in Jerez, but he improved steadily throughout the season, finishing the year with three victories in Assen, Misano, and Sepang, a second place in Mugello, and five third places in China, Barcelona, Germany, Japan, and Australia. He finished third in the standings, with 206 points.

=== MotoGP World Championship ===
==== Scot Racing Team (2009) ====
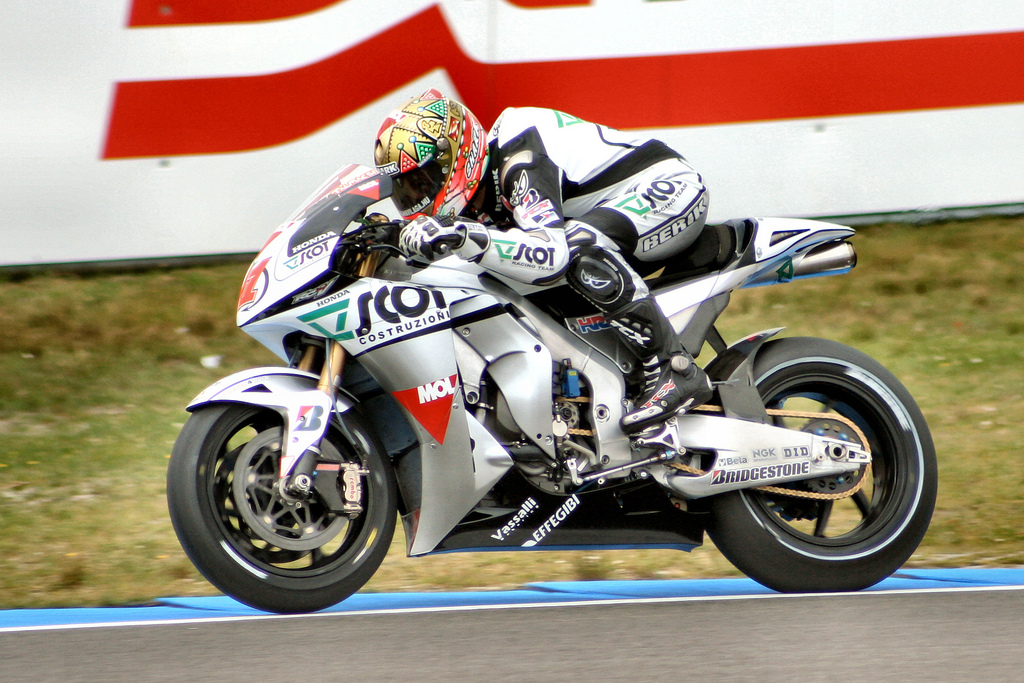
Talmácsi riding for the Scot Racing Team at the 2009 Dutch TT

Talmácsi started the 2009 season in the 250cc class, but left Aspar's Balatonring Team after only three races following a row over image rights, firing his manager Stefano Favaro in the process as well. His three results were all top-ten finishes, opening the season with a tenth place in Qatar, then a fourth place in the Japanese Grand Prix, and finally a seventh place in Jerez. Having gained the backing of Hungarian oil company MOL Group, Talmácsi moved to Scot Racing Team in MotoGP, from the sixth race of the season onwards. He initially joined the team as the teammate of Yuki Takahashi, but from Laguna Seca on, Talmácsi was the one and only rider of Team Scot. He scored his first MotoGP point in Germany, and he finished eight consecutive races in the points from Germany to Malaysia. His best result was 12th in Donington, finishing ahead of notable riders Chris Vermeulen, Casey Stoner and Nicky Hayden in wet conditions. Talmácsi finished his debut season in the Premier Class with 19 points, and 17th in the rider's championship.

=== Moto2 World Championship ===
==== Fimmco Speed Up (2010) ====
Realizing that MotoGP was a step too far, Talmácsi returned to the newly named Moto2 intermediate class (replacing 250cc bikes were 600cc four-stroke bikes), for the 2010 season. He got a contract offer from Speed Up to race alongside Andrea Iannone. Talmácsi accepted, and had an okay season, scoring regular high point finishes, but only stood on the podium once, a third place in Aragón. He ended the year with one pole position from Estoril, and sixth in the rider's championship, with 109 points.

==== G22 Racing Team (2011) ====
Originally planning to sign with G22 for the 2011 season, Talmácsi announced in February that terms could not be agreed upon, and that he would not be racing in the Moto2 season. His ex-manager Stefano Favaro criticized the G22 Team for choosing to go with Łukasz Wargala instead, who crashed out in his first race, and did not qualify for the second race, being outside the minimum time requirement in qualifying. Following this embarrassment, G22 fired Wargala, and signed Carmelo Morales instead. According to Favaro, Talmácsi had another contract offer which he declined in December 2010, which was a big mistake, as at age 30, he couldn't afford to miss a full season. Talmácsi and his new manager could not find a ride for 2012 either.

=== Supersport World Championship & retirement (2013) ===
Talmácsi got back to racing in the 2013 Supersport World Championship, but in his first six races, he only scored points in one, a 12th-place finish in Donington Park. In the next race at the Portimão Circuit, Talmácsi had an engine failure, and a part of the engine blew up, shattering off a piece of metal that hit his shin, instantly breaking his tibia. "My doctor explained what has happened to my leg, it is basically as if it had been fired at from close range with a pistol, the engine block exploded with such force. Doctors also found a dead muscle part, and I woke up to the fact that 70 to 80 percent of the anterior muscle from my leg had been removed because it was dead. This was because the muscle was simply hit too hard by the impact part. By the way, this muscle is responsible for being able to move my foot up, so I can't do that right now,” he said in an interview. He announced his retirement from motorcycle racing following the incident, no longer having the necessary strength in his legs to perform at an elite level.

=== Team owner in Superstock 600 (2014-2015) ===
For the 2014 season, Talmácsi has entered his own team, Talmácsi Racing, into the European Superstock 600 Championship, fielding current Moto2 rider Alessandro Zaccone, and Richárd Bódis. For 2015, he fielded only Zaccone, and the Superstock 600 series folded after the 2015 championship.

== Career statistics ==
=== Grand Prix motorcycle racing ===
==== By season ====
Season	Class	Motorcycle	Team	Number	Plcd	Race	Pts	Win	Podium	Pole	FLap
2000	125cc	Honda	Pannonia Racing	82	NC	1	0	0	0	0	0
2001	125cc	Honda	Racing Service	28	18th	16	34	0	0	0	0
2002	125cc	Italjet; Honda	Italjet Racing Service; PEV Moto ADAC Sachsen	8	22nd	15	20	0	0	0	0
2003	125cc	Aprilia	Exact Cycle Red Devil	79	14th	70	0	0	0	0	0
2004	125cc	Malaguti	Semprucci Malaguti	14	17th	16	43	0	0	0	0
2005	125cc	KTM	Red Bull KTM GP125	14	**3rd**	16	198	3	5	1	1
2006	125cc	Honda	Humangest Racing Team	14	7th	16	119	0	1	0	0
2007	125cc	Aprilia	Bancaja Aspar	14	**1st**	17	282	3	10	5	6
2008	125cc	Aprilia	Bancaja Aspar Team	1	**3rd**	17	206	3	9	4	2
2009	250cc	Aprilia	Balatonring Team	28	18th	3	28	0	0	0	0
2009	MotoGP	Honda	Scot Racing Team MotoGP	41	17th	12	19	0	0	0	0
2010	Moto2	Speed Up	Fimmco Speed Up	2	6th	17	109	0	1	1	0

==== By class ====
Class	Seasons	1st GP	1st Pod	1st Win	Race	Win	Podiums	Pole	FLap	Pts	WChmp
125cc	2000–2008	2000 Czech Republic	2005 China	2005 Italy	130	9	25	10	9	972	1
250cc	2009	2009 Qatar			3	0	0	0	0	28	0
Moto2	2010	2010 Qatar	2010 Aragon		17	0	1	1	0	109	0
MotoGP	2009	2009 Catalunya			12	0	0	0	0	19	0
Total	2000–2010				**162**	**9**	**26**	**11**	**9**	**1128**	**1**

==== Races by year ====
(key) (Races in bold indicate pole position, races in italics indicate fastest lap)

Year	Class	Bike	1	2	3	4	5	6	7	8	9	10	11	12	13	14	15	16	17	Pos	Pts
1997	125cc	Honda	MAL	JPN	SPA	ITA	AUT	FRA	NED	IMO	GER	BRA	GBR	CZE; DNQ	CAT	INA	AUS			NC	0
2000	125cc	Honda	RSA	MAL	JPN	SPA	FRA	ITA	CAT	NED	GBR	GER	CZE; 20	POR	VAL	BRA	PAC	AUS		NC	0
2001	125cc	Honda	JPN; 23	RSA; 21	SPA; 17	FRA; 16	ITA; 14	CAT; 17	NED; Ret	GBR; 10	GER; 18	CZE; 9	POR; 12	VAL; 11	PAC; 6	AUS; 28	MAL; 20	BRA; Ret		18th	34
2002	125cc	Italjet	JPN; Ret	RSA; 18	SPA; 20	FRA; Ret	ITA; Ret	CAT												22nd	20
2002	125cc	Honda							NED; 15	GBR; Ret	GER; 18	CZE; 11	POR; Ret	BRA; 4	PAC; 21	MAL; Ret	AUS; 16	VAL; 15		22nd	20
2003	125cc	Aprilia	JPN; 14	RSA; Ret	SPA; 19	FRA; 16	ITA; 16	CAT; 9	NED; 9	GBR; 9	GER; 6	CZE; 11	POR; 7	BRA; 8	PAC; 14	MAL; 14	AUS; 9	VAL; 12		14th	70
2004	125cc	Malaguti	RSA; Ret	SPA; Ret	FRA; 16	ITA; 13	CAT; 17	NED; 17	BRA; 19	GER; 16	GBR; 13	CZE; Ret	POR; 7	JPN; 8	QAT; Ret	MAL; 8	AUS; 11	VAL; 9		17th	43
2005	125cc	KTM	SPA; 5	POR; Ret	CHN; 3	FRA; 6	ITA; 1	CAT; 4	NED; 1	GBR; Ret	GER; 4	CZE; 9	**JPN**; Ret	MAL; 5	QAT; 1	AUS; 7	TUR; 4	VAL; 2		**3rd**	**198**
2006	125cc	Honda	SPA; 8	QAT; 11	TUR; 6	CHN; 4	FRA; 17	ITA; 8	CAT; 8	NED; 11	GBR; 10	GER; 14	CZE; 3	MAL; 8	AUS; 9	JPN; 9	POR; 8	VAL; 9		7th	119
2007	125cc	Aprilia	**QAT**; 2	SPA; 1	TUR; 5	CHN; 4	FRA; 4	ITA; 4	**CAT**; 2	GBR; Ret	NED; 3	**GER**; 1	**CZE**; 4	RSM; 2	POR; 2	JPN; 2	AUS; 8	MAL; 1	**VAL**; 2	**1st**	**282**
2008	125cc	Aprilia	QAT; 12	SPA; Ret	POR; 6	CHN; 3	FRA; 14	ITA; 2	CAT; 3	GBR; Ret	NED; 1	**GER**; 3	**CZE**; 4	**RSM**; 1	INP; 14	JPN; 3	AUS; 3	MAL; 1	**VAL**; Ret	**3rd**	**206**
2009	250cc	Aprilia	QAT; 10	JPN; 4	SPA; 7	FRA	ITA													18th	28
2009	MotoGP	Honda						CAT; 17	NED; 16	USA; Ret	GER; 15	GBR; 12	CZE; 13	INP; 14	RSM; 14	POR; 14	AUS; 13	MAL; 14	VAL; 16	17th	19
2010	Moto2	Speed Up	QAT; 9	SPA; 9	FRA; 5	ITA; 7	GBR; Ret	NED; 13	CAT; 11	GER; 6	CZE; 6	INP; 8	RSM; 7	ARA; 3	JPN; 21	MAL; Ret	AUS; 18	**POR**; 8	VAL; 10	6th	109

=== Supersport World Championship ===
==== Races by year ====
(key) (Races in bold indicate pole position, races in italics indicate fastest lap)

Year	Bike	1	2	3	4	5	6	7	8	9	10	11	12	13	Pos	Pts
2012	Honda	AUS	ITA	NED	ITA	EUR	SMR; 15	SPA; 9	CZE; 12	GBR; 10	RUS; 8	GER; 6	POR; 15	FRA; 9	13th	44
2013	Honda	AUS; DNS	SPA; Ret	NED; 16	ITA; 19	GBR; 12	POR; Ret	ITA	RUS	GBR	GER	TUR	FRA	SPA	27th	4

Awards
Preceded by László Cseh	Hungarian Sportsman of The Year; 2007	Succeeded by Attila Vajda
