= Scot Racing Team =

Italian motorcycle racing team

- 2009 name: Scot Racing Team
- Base: San Marino (Main); Italy (Work Shop)
- Principal: Cirano Mularoni
- Riders' Championships: 125cc: 2004: Andrea Dovizioso; 250cc: 2009: Hiroshi Aoyama

Scot Racing Team is a motorcycle racing team from Italy. For 2009 it ran in MotoGP as a self-contained entity for the first time, running Hungarian rider Gábor Talmácsi on a Honda. They also continued with their long-time involvement in the 250cc class, running 2008 125cc runner-up Simone Corsi on a Honda. They withdrew from MotoGP at the end of the 2009 season.

== History ==
Scot Racing Team was established in 1992 by Cirano Mularoni and Giovanni Torri president of Scot Costruzioni, an Italian construction company. The team's head office site in the Republic of San Marino and its technical department in Cesena, Italy. Since 1994 the team has been using Honda motorcycles in all categories.

The team had a 7-year association with Andrea Dovizioso. Dovizioso debuted in 125cc with Team Scot in 2002, winning the 125cc class title in 2004 before moving to 250cc in 2005 again with Team Scot.

Dovizioso finished the 2005 season 3rd overall and he was 2nd overall in 2006 and 2007 taking strong results on Hondas which were not actively developed.

In 2008 both team and rider moved to MotoGP. Team Scot began a collaboration with JiR, who had been running in MotoGP for three years under Konica Minolta branding. With Dovizioso as their sole rider, the team was the most competitive non-works Honda squad, scoring a podium and six other top-five finishes to place fifth overall. The collaboration with JiR ended at the end of the season, and Team Scot agreed to carry on in MotoGP under their sole banner. Lack of support led the team to withdraw from MotoGP at the end of the 2009 season; the team will participate solely in the Moto2 category.

Team Scot riders included Bruno Casanova, Fausto Gresini, Emilio Alzamora, Sete Gibernau, Roberto Locatelli, Arnaud Vincent, Gábor Talmácsi, Mike Di Meglio, Yuki Takahashi and 2009 250cc World Champion, Hiroshi Aoyama.
