= JIR Racing Team =

Motorcycle racing team

JiR
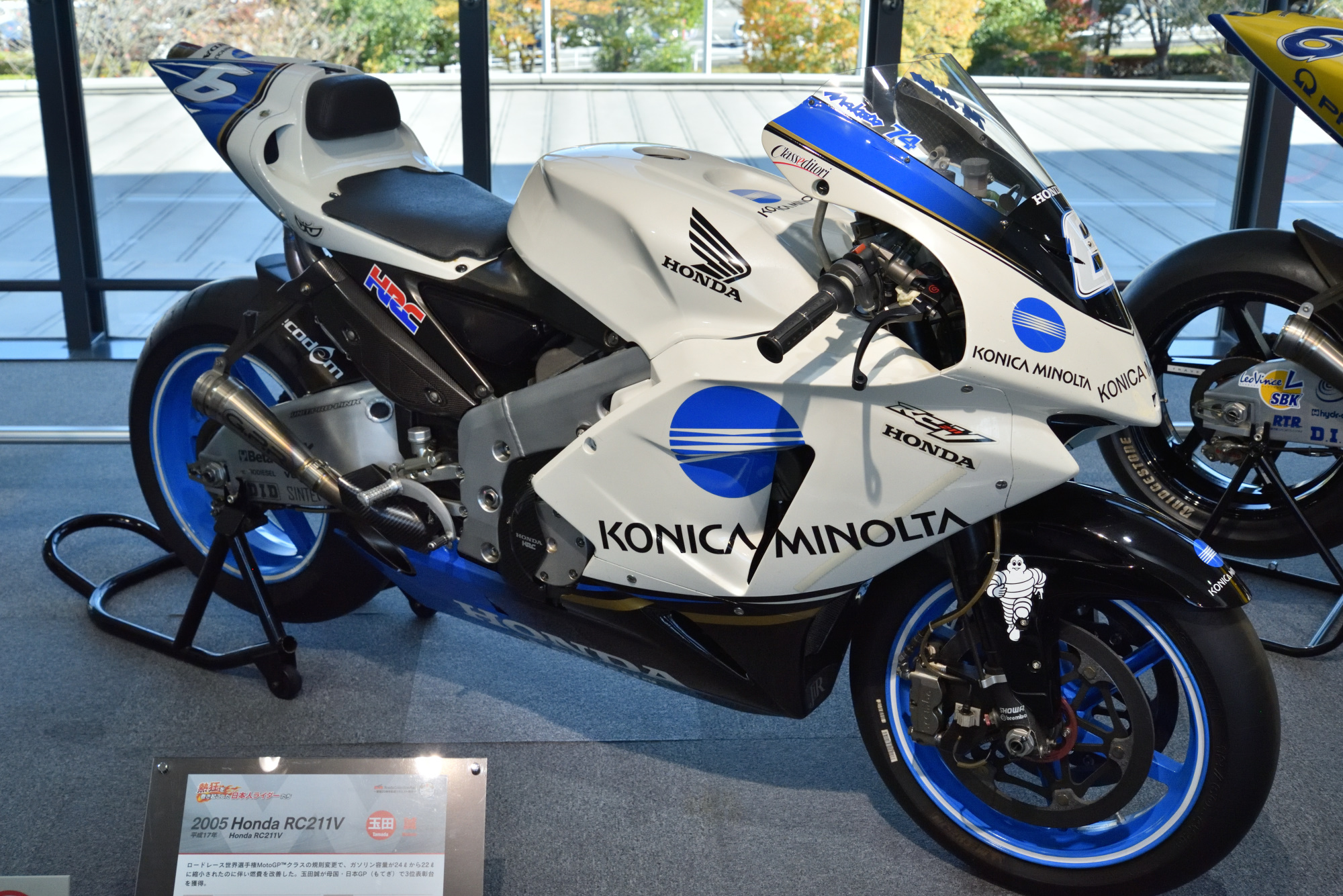
- 2015 name: JIR Racing Team
- Base: Monte Carlo, Monaco
- Principal: Gianluca Montiron
- Rider(s): 4. (Switzerland) Randy Krummenacher
- Motorcycle: Kalex
- Tyres: Dunlop

Japan Italy Racing, more commonly known as JiR, is a Monte Carlo based motorcycle racing team which competed in the MotoGP series from 2005 to 2008 and from 2010 to 2015 in the Moto2 class.

== Team setup ==
The team was founded by Gianluca Montiron together with Honda Motor Europe founder Tetsuo Iida. Since the team's founding, Montiron has diversified the investments keeping the Head Office as the team's central core, although all its activities are independent. The Monaco-based company develops commercial and sport interests, including marketing and communication initiatives – such as the brand's internationalisation. Motorsport, real estate investments and corporate social responsibility (CSR) are the services provided by JiR's different companies.

=== JiR Italy ===
JiR Italy S.r.l. was founded in 2009 in Castelletto di Branduzzo, Italy, some 45 km (28 mi) south of Milan. The Italian facility is well equipped for promotional activities and is located near to the Motodromo circuit, the 7 Laghi go kart and jet ski tracks.

=== SCI JiR ===
SCI JiR is a real estate company that has the property of the team's facilities in Castelletto di Branduzzo and in the French Riviera.

== History ==
=== MotoGP (2005–2008) ===
The team first entered the MotoGP World Championship in 2005 as Konica Minolta Honda, a single motorcycle team using the Honda RC211V with Japanese rider Makoto Tamada and Michelin as tyre supplier. A 3rd-place finish at the Japanese Grand Prix was the team's best result. The team used the same package for the 2006 season, but was unable to repeat the 2005 results finishing twelfth in the championship, with a best result of fifth at the Portuguese Grand Prix. In 2007, Shinya Nakano replaced Tamada as the rider of the new 800cc Honda RC212V. The motorcycle did not achieve the results expected finishing in seventeenth position.

The team's results improved in 2008, when 2004 125cc World Champion Andrea Dovizioso joined the team, which once again used the Honda RC212V on Michelin tyres. They were re-branded as JiR Team Scot after a joint venture with Team Scot. The team ran also Yuki Takahashi in the 250cc class; Dovizioso finished fifth overall in the MotoGP standings. The team split during the season, leaving the two parts of the team competing for the rights to run a Honda in MotoGP in 2009, but it was Team Scot who retained Honda support, so JiR withdrew from the top class.

=== Moto2 (2010–2015) ===
In 2010 the team took part in the new Moto2 class on a TSR built, Motobi branded chassis ridden by Simone Corsi and Mattia Pasini, although the latter was replaced during the season by Yusuke Teshima and Alex de Angelis. Corsi achieved third place twice, while de Angelis scored two podiums, including a victory from pole position in the Australian Grand Prix. In 2011, the team ran only one bike with de Angelis, who took another victory in Australia and clinched fourth place in the final standings.

The team signed Johann Zarco, 125cc runner-up in 2011, and Eric Granado for Moto2 in 2012. Zarco finished in tenth place in the championship standings, the best-placed rookie. In 2013 former 125cc world champion Mike Di Meglio joined the team – he finished the season in 20th place in the championship, despite missing the final seven races due to a broken sacrum sustained at Brno. Five riders replaced him over those races, but no further points were accrued.

The 2014 Moto2 season started with a young rider project with Japanese GP2 champion Kohta Nozane but the premature death of his father during the off-season discouraged his participation. He was replaced by Tetsuta Nagashima, but his season was shortened by an injury suffered at the British Grand Prix. He returned for the final race at Valencia, having been replaced by Federico Caricasulo, Kenny Noyes and Tomoyoshi Koyama in between. None of the riders scored points during the season.

In 2015 the Swiss rider Randy Krummenacher joined the team, but the team left the championship at the end of the season.

== Results ==
=== Summary ===
Year	Class	Team name	Bike	Riders	Races	Wins	Podiums	Poles	F. laps	Points	Pos.
2005	MotoGP	Konica Minolta Honda	Honda RC211V	(Japan) Makoto Tamada	14	0	1	0	0	91	11th
2005	MotoGP	Konica Minolta Honda	Honda RC211V	(Netherlands) Jurgen van den Goorbergh	2	0	0	0	0	12	20th
2006	MotoGP	Konica Minolta Honda	Honda RC211V	(Japan) Makoto Tamada	17	0	0	0	0	96	12th
2007	MotoGP	Konica Minolta Honda	Honda RC212V	(Japan) Shinya Nakano	18	0	0	0	0	47	17th
2008	MotoGP	JiR Team Scot MotoGP	Honda RC212V	(Italy) Andrea Dovizioso	18	0	1	0	0	174	5th
2008	250cc	JiR Team Scot 250	Honda RS250RW	(Japan) Yuki Takahashi	16	0	3	0	0	167	5th
2010	Moto2	JiR Moto2	Motobi TSR6	(Italy) Simone Corsi	17	0	2	0	0	138	5th
2010	Moto2	JiR Moto2	Motobi TSR6	(Italy) Mattia Pasini^{[a]}	6 (8)	0	0	0	0	12	28th
2010	Moto2	JiR Moto2	Motobi TSR6	(Japan) Yusuke Teshima^{[a]}	4 (5)	0	0	0	0	1	39th
2010	Moto2	JiR Moto2	Motobi TSR6	(San Marino) Alex de Angelis^{[a]}	7 (12)	1	3	1	1	84 (95)	11th
2011	Moto2	JiR Moto2	Motobi TSR6	(San Marino) Alex de Angelis	17	1	2	1	2	174	4th
2012	Moto2	JiR Moto2	Motobi TSR6	(France) Johann Zarco	17	0	0	0	0	94	10th
2012	Moto2	JiR Moto2	Motobi TSR6	(Brazil) Eric Granado	11	0	0	0	0	0	NC
2013	Moto2	JiR Moto2	Motobi TSR6	(France) Mike Di Meglio	10	0	0	0	0	18	20th
2013	Moto2	JiR Moto2	Motobi TSR6	(Japan) Kohta Nozane^{[a]}	2 (3)	0	0	0	0	0	NC
2013	Moto2	JiR Moto2	Motobi TSR6	(Australia) Jason O'Halloran	2	0	0	0	0	0	NC
2013	Moto2	JiR Moto2	Motobi TSR6	(Spain) Román Ramos^{[a]}	1 (2)	0	0	0	0	0	NC
2013	Moto2	JiR Moto2	Motobi TSR6	(Indonesia) Fadli Immammuddin	1	0	0	0	0	0	NC
2013	Moto2	JiR Moto2	Motobi TSR6	(Japan) Tetsuta Nagashima	1	0	0	0	0	0	NC
2014	Moto2	Teluru Team JiR Webike	TSR TSR6; NTS NH6	(Japan) Tetsuta Nagashima	13	0	0	0	0	0	NC
2014	Moto2	Teluru Team JiR Webike	TSR TSR6; NTS NH6	(United States) Kenny Noyes	1	0	0	0	0	0	NC
2014	Moto2	Teluru Team JiR Webike	TSR TSR6; NTS NH6	(Italy) Federico Caricasulo	1	0	0	0	0	0	NC
2014	Moto2	Teluru Team JiR Webike	TSR TSR6; NTS NH6	(Japan) Tomoyoshi Koyama	3	0	0	0	0	0	NC
2015	Moto2	JiR Moto2	Kalex Moto2 2014	(Switzerland) Randy Krummenacher	18	0	0	0	0	31	21st

- ^{a} Competed for other teams during the season.

=== MotoGP results ===
(key)

Year	Bike	Tyres	Riders	1	2	3	4	5	6	7	8	9	10	11	12	13	14	15	16	17	18	Points	Pos.
2005	Honda RC211V	M		ESP	POR	CHN	FRA	ITA	CAT	NED	USA	GBR	GER	CZE	JPN	MAL	QAT	AUS	TUR	VAL		103	9th
2005	Honda RC211V	M	(Japan) Makoto Tamada	8	DNS			8	Ret	14	7	7	10	10	3	12	Ret	8	8	9		103	9th
2005	Honda RC211V	M	(Netherlands) Jurgen van den Goorbergh			6	14															103	9th
2006	Honda RC211V	M		ESP	QAT	TUR	CHN	FRA	ITA	CAT	NED	GBR	GER	USA	CZE	MAL	AUS	JPN	POR	VAL		96	10th
2006	Honda RC211V	M	(Japan) Makoto Tamada	10	14	10	6	7	9	7	11	11	Ret	11	13	14	10	10	5	12		96	10th
2007	Honda RC212V	M		QAT	ESP	TUR	CHN	FRA	ITA	CAT	GBR	NED	GER	USA	CZE	SMR	POR	JPN	AUS	MAL	VAL	47	10th
2007	Honda RC212V	M	(Japan) Shinya Nakano	10	10	13	Ret	Ret	13	15	14	12	Ret	12	14	10	11	16	13	16	14	47	10th
2008	Honda RC212V	M		QAT	ESP	POR	CHN	FRA	ITA	CAT	GBR	NED	GER	USA	CZE	SMR	IND	JPN	AUS	MAL	VAL	174	7th
2008	Honda RC212V	M	(Italy) Andrea Dovizioso	4	8	Ret	11	6	8	4	5	5	5	4	9	8	5	9	7	3	4	174	7th
