= Makoto Tamada =

Japanese motorcycle racer

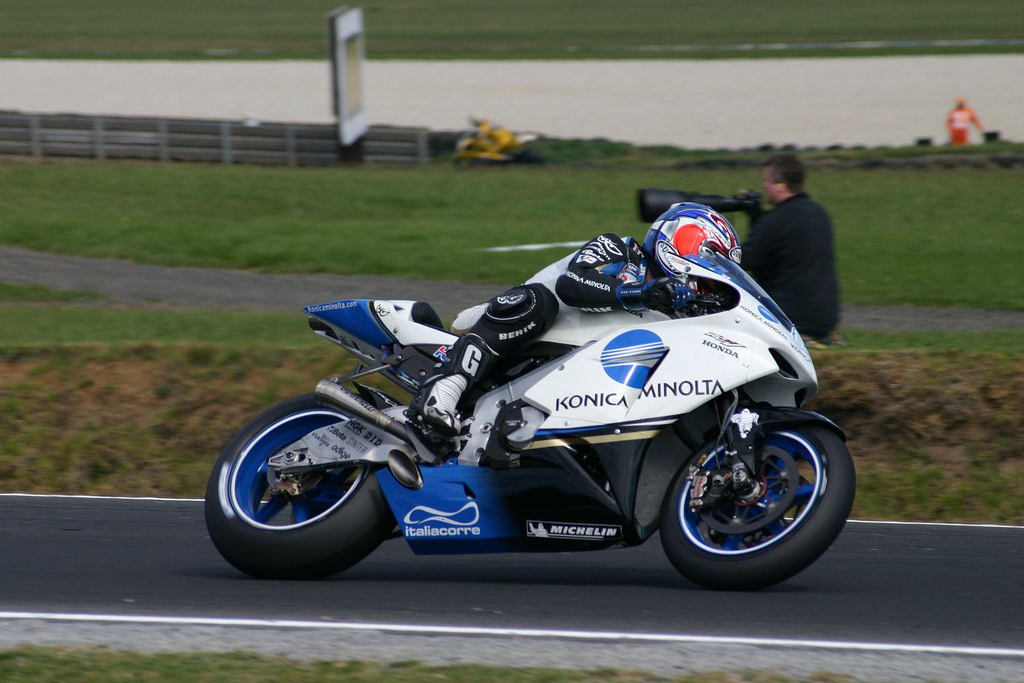
- Tamada in 2006
- Nationality: Japanese
- Born: November 4, 1976 (age 50); Ehime Prefecture, Japan
- Website: tamayangp.com
Motorcycle racing career statistics
Grand Prix motorcycle racing
Active years	1998, 2003–2007
First race	1998 250cc Japanese Grand Prix
Last race	2007 MotoGP Valencian Grand Prix
First win	2004 MotoGP Rio de Janeiro Grand Prix
Last win	2004 MotoGP Japanese Grand Prix
Team(s)	Honda, Yamaha
Championships	0
Starts / Wins / Podiums / Poles / F. laps / Points; 82 / 2 / 5 / 3 / 2 / 462
Superbike World Championship
Active years	1999–2002, 2008–2011
Manufacturers	Honda, Kawasaki, BMW
Championships	0
2011 championship position	NC (0 pts)
Starts / Wins / Podiums / Poles / F. laps / Points; 51 / 3 / 4 / 1 / 3 / 169

Makoto Tamada (玉田誠) (born November 4, 1976, in Matsuyama, Ehime Prefecture, Japan) is a Japanese former professional motorcycle racer currently working as a rider instructor at Suzuka Racing School. He is one of the few riders to win races in both MotoGP and Superbike World Championship.

== Career ==
=== Early career ===
After a junior career in minibikes, Tamada won a regional 250cc championship in 1994. He then spent four years in the main Japanese 250cc series, finishing fourth on a private bike in 1998. He entered the MFJ Superbike championship in 1999. He finished in the championship top-five for the next four years, but came to international fame as a wild card in the Superbike World Championship round at Sugo, upsetting the regulars to win both races in 2001, and a further race in 2002, being the only rider other than Colin Edwards or Troy Bayliss to have won a race during the 2002 season.

=== MotoGP World Championship ===
This helped earn Tamada a call up to MotoGP in 2003, for Pramac Honda. The first season was a learning year, peaking with a third place at Rio and two front row starts, finishing 11th overall. He joined Sito Pons' Camel Honda a year later. 2004 was his strongest MotoGP season to date, with wins at Rio and Motegi and sixth overall. He was the only Honda rider to use Bridgestone tyres, which appear to suit his style.

The Konica Minolta Honda team was formed in late 2004 with Tamada in mind, and he spent two years there using Michelin rubber. Unfortunately, a broken wrist sustained early in the season prevented him from reaching the championship top-ten, although he did finish third at his home race. He was also short of top results in 2006. At the Sachsenring, he ran third early on, and was still in the top-six when he went out wide to avoid Kenny Roberts, Jr. crashing, only to be hit by the American's riderless bike.

In 2007, Tamada joined the Tech 3 Yamaha team in MotoGP using Dunlop tyres, alongside French rider Sylvain Guintoli. He was generally outpaced by his rookie teammate and finished the season 18th.

=== Superbike World Championship ===
Tamada was left with no options in MotoGP so for 2008 he turned his focus on the Superbike World Championship. Kawasaki expressed their desire to hire him, quoting: "Tamada has been a target for Kawasaki for some time and his signing consolidates the PSG-1 Corse team and Kawasaki’s mutual commitment to gain success in the forthcoming season."

Tamada joined the Italian factory supported Kawasaki team, PSG-1 Kawasaki Corse, where he piloted the all-new 2008 Kawasaki ZX-10R along with Frenchman Regis Laconi, who rode for them in both 2006 and 2007. For 2009, he remained a factory Kawasaki rider, as they switched their support to the English Paul Bird Motorsport team, alongside Australian Broc Parkes.

On October 6, 2009, Kawasaki announced that Tamada would not be offered a contract for 2010. His place would be taken by former MotoGP rider Chris Vermeulen.

=== 2010 ===
In 2010, Tamada returned to WSBK in a one-off outing for the Reitwagen BMW team at Portimao in Portugal. He retired from the first race and finished 19th in the second race.

=== 2011 ===
On July 31, 2011, Tamada competed in the Suzuka 8 Hour race for the Musashi RT Harc-Pro team. He rode alongside former 500cc racer Tadayuki Okada and Takumi Takahashi. The team eventually took third position in the race, roughly one and a half minutes after the winning team finished.

In late August, it was announced that Tamada would race in the Nurburgring round of the 2011 Superbike World Championship for the Castrol Honda team. He replaced Rubén Xaus, who was sitting out the race due to a back injury.

=== 2012 ===
Tamada was appointed official trainer of the inaugural Asia Dream Cup season by Honda in 2012. The Asia Dream Cup raced with Honda CBR250R, and two riders from each Asian country was selected. Tamada was appointed to train the young riders to one day become a World Championship rider.

In July, Tamada competed in the Suzuka 8 Hours with Honda Team Asia. His teammates were Malaysian rider, Azlan Shah Kamaruzaman and Japanese veteran, Chojun Kameya. They qualified 10th, but early mechanical problems forced them to a 25th-place finish.

=== 2013 ===
Honda and Tamada's agency, Speed of Japan, both announced Tamada's full time ride in the Asia Road Racing Championship in the Supersports 600 class with MUSASHi Boon Siew Honda Racing, the factory team for Honda in the series. He is replacing in Ryuichi Kiyonari, who won the title in 2012 and has gone back to BSB in 2013.

Tamada, stating that it took him more time to get used to a 600cc machine at the beginning of the season, actually made it fast. He got his first podium finish at Race 2 of Round 1 in Sepang. He then got his first win at Race 1 at Round 3, and went on winning Race 2.

However, Tamada suffered the later half of the season from injuries he got from a crash during the Suzuka 8 Hours practice. Fractures of the left clavicle and scapula, as well as fractures on the left ankle were found. Furthermore, a minor amputation of the left middle finger was found. This made Tamada pull out of the Suzuka 8 Hours race, as well as, Round 4 and 5 of the Asia Road Racing Championship.

== Career statistics ==
=== Career highlights ===
1995–11th, All Japan Road Race GP250 Championship #73 Honda RS250R
1996–14th, All Japan Road Race GP250 Championship #11 Honda RS250R
1997–6th, All Japan Road Race GP250 Championship #14 Honda RS250R
1998–4th, All Japan Road Race GP250 Championship #6 Honda RS250R
1999–5th, All Japan Road Race Superbike Championship #100 Honda RVF750 RC45
2000–3rd, All Japan Road Race Superbike Championship #100 Honda RVF750 RC45
2001–2nd, All Japan Road Race Superbike Championship #100 Honda VTR1000F
2002–4th, All Japan Road Race Superbike Championship #100 Honda VTR1000F
2003–11th, MotoGP #6 Honda RC211V
2004–6th, MotoGP #6 Honda RC211V
2005–11th, MotoGP #6 Honda RC211V
2006–12th, MotoGP #6 Honda RC211V
2007–18th, MotoGP #6 Yamaha YZR-M1
2008–20th, Superbike World Championship #100 Kawasaki ZX-10R
2009–27th, Superbike World Championship #100 Kawasaki ZX-10R
2011–3rd, Suzuka 8 Hours #634 Honda CBR1000RR
2012–25th, Suzuka 8 Hours #25 Honda CBR1000RR
2013–8th, Asia Road Race SS600 Championship #100 Honda CBR600RR
2014–6th, Asia Road Race SS600 Championship #100 Honda CBR600RR

=== Grand Prix motorcycle racing ===
==== By season ====
Season	Class	Motorcycle	Team	Number	Race	Win	Podium	Pole	FLap	Pts	Plcd	WCh
1998	250cc	Honda NSR250	Team Kotake	53	1	0	0	0	0	0	NC	–
2003	MotoGP	Honda RC211V	Pramac Honda	6	16	0	1	0	0	87	11th	–
2004	MotoGP	Honda RC211V	Camel Honda	6	16	2	3	3	2	150	6th	–
2005	MotoGP	Honda RC211V	Konica Minolta Honda	6	14	0	1	0	0	91	11th	–
2006	MotoGP	Honda RC211V	Konica Minolta Honda	6	17	0	0	0	0	96	12th	–
2007	MotoGP	Yamaha YZR-M1	Dunlop Yamaha Tech3	6	18	0	0	0	0	38	18th	–
Total					**82**	**2**	**5**	**3**	**2**	**462**		**0**

==== Races by year ====
(key) (Races in bold indicate pole position; races in italics indicate fastest lap)

Year	Class	Bike	1	2	3	4	5	6	7	8	9	10	11	12	13	14	15	16	17	18	Pos	Pts
1998	250cc	Honda	JPN; 16	MAL	SPA	ITA	FRA	MAD	NED	GBR	GER	CZE	IMO	CAT	AUS	ARG					NC	0
2003	MotoGP	Honda	JPN; Ret	RSA; 14	SPA; 6	FRA; Ret	ITA; 4	CAT; 7	NED; 16	GBR; 13	GER; 13	CZE; 9	POR; 10	BRA; 3	PAC; DSQ	MAL; 10	AUS; 10	VAL; 10			11th	87
2004	MotoGP	Honda	RSA; 8	SPA; Ret	FRA; 9	ITA; Ret	CAT; Ret	NED; 12	BRA; 1	GER; 6	GBR; 14	CZE; 4	**POR**; 2	**JPN**; 1	QAT; 10	MAL; 5	AUS; 8	**VAL**; 5			6th	150
2005	MotoGP	Honda	SPA; 8	POR; DNS	CHN	FRA	ITA; 8	CAT; Ret	NED; 14	USA; 7	GBR; 7	GER; 10	CZE; 10	JPN; 3	MAL; 12	QAT; Ret	AUS; 8	TUR; 9	VAL; 9		11th	91
2006	MotoGP	Honda	SPA; 10	QAT; 14	TUR; 10	CHN; 6	FRA; 7	ITA; 9	CAT; 7	NED; 11	GBR; 11	GER; Ret	USA; 11	CZE; 13	MAL; 14	AUS; 10	JPN; 10	POR; 5	VAL; 12		12th	96
2007	MotoGP	Yamaha	QAT; 16	SPA; 14	TUR; 14	CHN; Ret	FRA; 9	ITA; 15	CAT; 12	GBR; 15	NED; 13	GER; 13	USA; 8	CZE; 17	RSM; 14	POR; Ret	JPN; 12	AUS; 16	MAL; 18	VAL; 15	18th	38

=== Superbike World Championship ===
==== Races by year ====
(key) (Races in bold indicate pole position; races in italics indicate fastest lap)

Year	Bike	1		2		3		4		5		6		7		8		9		10		11		12		13		14		Pos	Pts
Year	Bike	R1	R2	R1	R2	R1	R2	R1	R2	R1	R2	R1	R2	R1	R2	R1	R2	R1	R2	R1	R2	R1	R2	R1	R2	R1	R2	R1	R2	Pos	Pts
1999	Honda	RSA	RSA	AUS	AUS	GBR	GBR	SPA	SPA	ITA	ITA	GER	GER	SMR	SMR	USA	USA	EUR	EUR	AUT	AUT	NED	NED	GER	GER	JPN; 10	JPN; 10			38th	12
2000	Honda	RSA	RSA	AUS	AUS	JPN; 7	JPN; Ret	GBR	GBR	ITA	ITA	GER	GER	SMR	SMR	SPA	SPA	USA	USA	EUR	EUR	NED	NED	GER	GER	GBR	GBR			37th	9
2001	Honda	SPA	SPA	RSA	RSA	AUS	AUS	**JPN**; 1	**JPN**; 1	ITA	ITA	GBR	GBR	GER	GER	SMR	SMR	USA	USA	EUR	EUR	GER	GER	NED	NED	ITA	ITA			15th	50
2002	Honda	SPA	SPA	AUS	AUS	RSA	RSA	JPN; 2	JPN; 1	ITA	ITA	GBR	GBR	GER	GER	SMR	SMR	USA	USA	GBR	GBR	GER	GER	NED	NED	ITA	ITA			18th	45
2008	Kawasaki	QAT; Ret	QAT; 12	AUS; Ret	AUS; 14	SPA; 9	SPA; Ret	NED; 8	NED; 9	ITA; Ret	ITA; Ret	USA; 19	USA; 13	GER; 9	GER; 13	SMR; Ret	SMR; Ret	CZE; 16	CZE; 17	GBR; 18	GBR; 18	EUR; Ret	EUR; 16	ITA; 20	ITA; 19	FRA; 18	FRA; 18	POR; 19	POR; 24	20th	41
2009	Kawasaki	AUS; 18	AUS; 17	QAT; DNS	QAT; DNS	SPA; 14	SPA; Ret	NED; 17	NED; Ret	ITA; DNS	ITA; DNS	RSA	RSA	USA	USA	SMR	SMR	GBR	GBR	CZE; 10	CZE; Ret	GER; DNS	GER; DNS	ITA; Ret	ITA; DNS	FRA	FRA	POR; 12	POR; 16	27th	12
2010	BMW	AUS	AUS	POR; Ret	POR; 19	SPA	SPA	NED	NED	ITA	ITA	RSA	RSA	USA	USA	SMR	SMR	CZE	CZE	GBR	GBR	GER	GER	ITA	ITA	FRA	FRA			NC	0
2011	Honda	AUS	AUS	EUR	EUR	NED	NED	ITA	ITA	USA	USA	SMR	SMR	SPA	SPA	CZE	CZE	GBR	GBR	GER; 17	GER; Ret	ITA	ITA	FRA	FRA	POR	POR			NC	0
