= Pons Racing =

British motorcycle and auto racing team

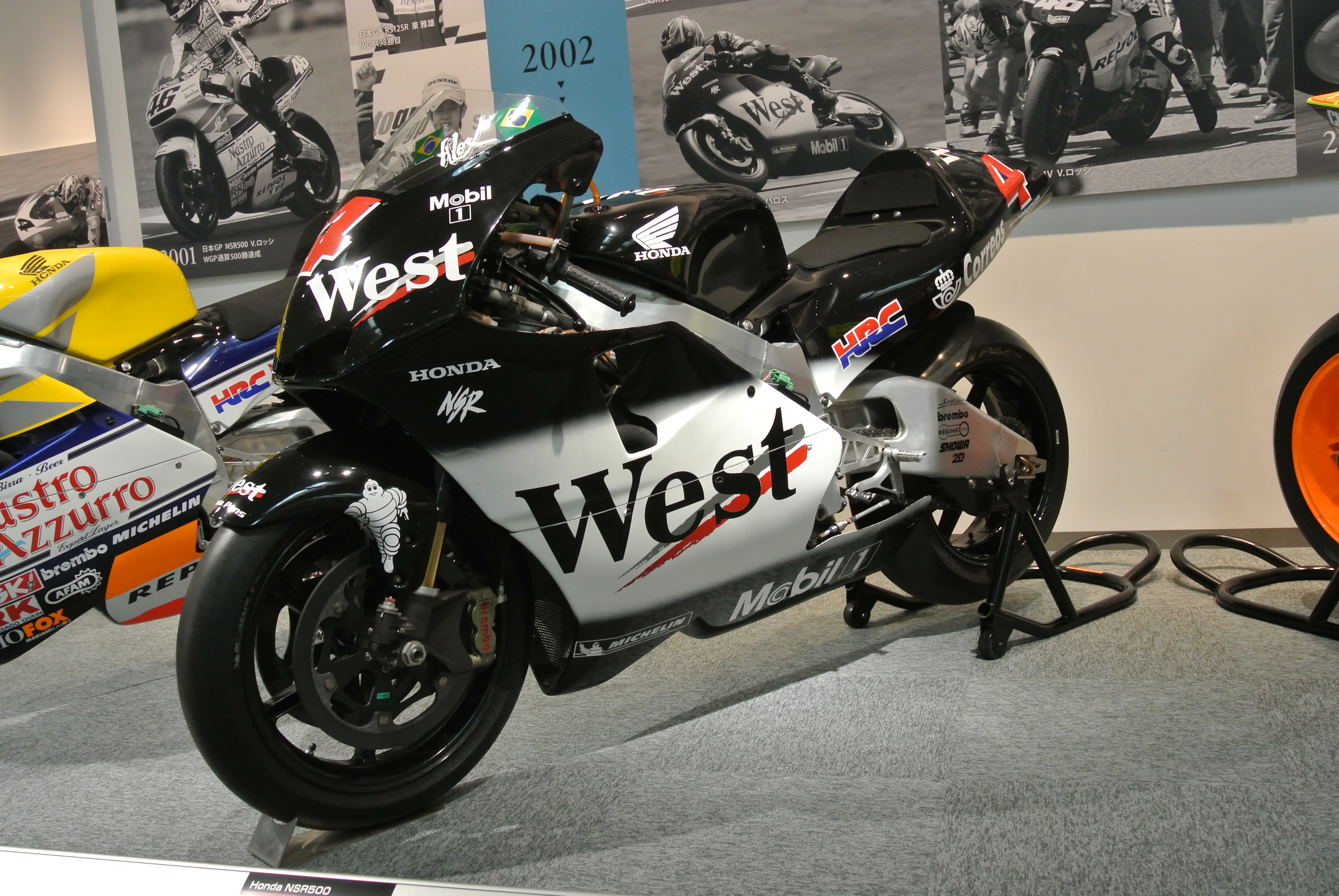
- Base: London, UK
- Riders' Championships: CEV Moto2; 2014: Jesko Raffin; 2015: Edgar Pons; Moto2: 2013: Pol Espargaró; MotoE: 2020: Jordi Torres; 2021: Jordi Torres; 2023: Mattia Casadei
- Teams' Championships: Moto2: 2019; MotoE: 2023

- Founded: 1992
- Folded: 2023
- Former series: Formula Renault 3.5 Series
- Teams' Championships: 2004 World Series by Nissan
- Drivers' Championships: 2004 World Series by Nissan (Kovalainen)
- Website: www.ponsracing.com

Pons Racing was a motorcycle and auto racing team owned by the British company Pons Racing UK Limited. The team principal is former 250 cc world champion, Sito Pons. In motorcycle road racing world championships, Pons has fielded riders such as Alex Barros, Max Biaggi, Loris Capirossi and Sete Gibernau. In auto racing, his team won the 2004 World Series by Nissan championship with driver Heikki Kovalainen.

At the end of 2023, the team officially left Grand Prix motorcycle racing as a whole.

== History ==
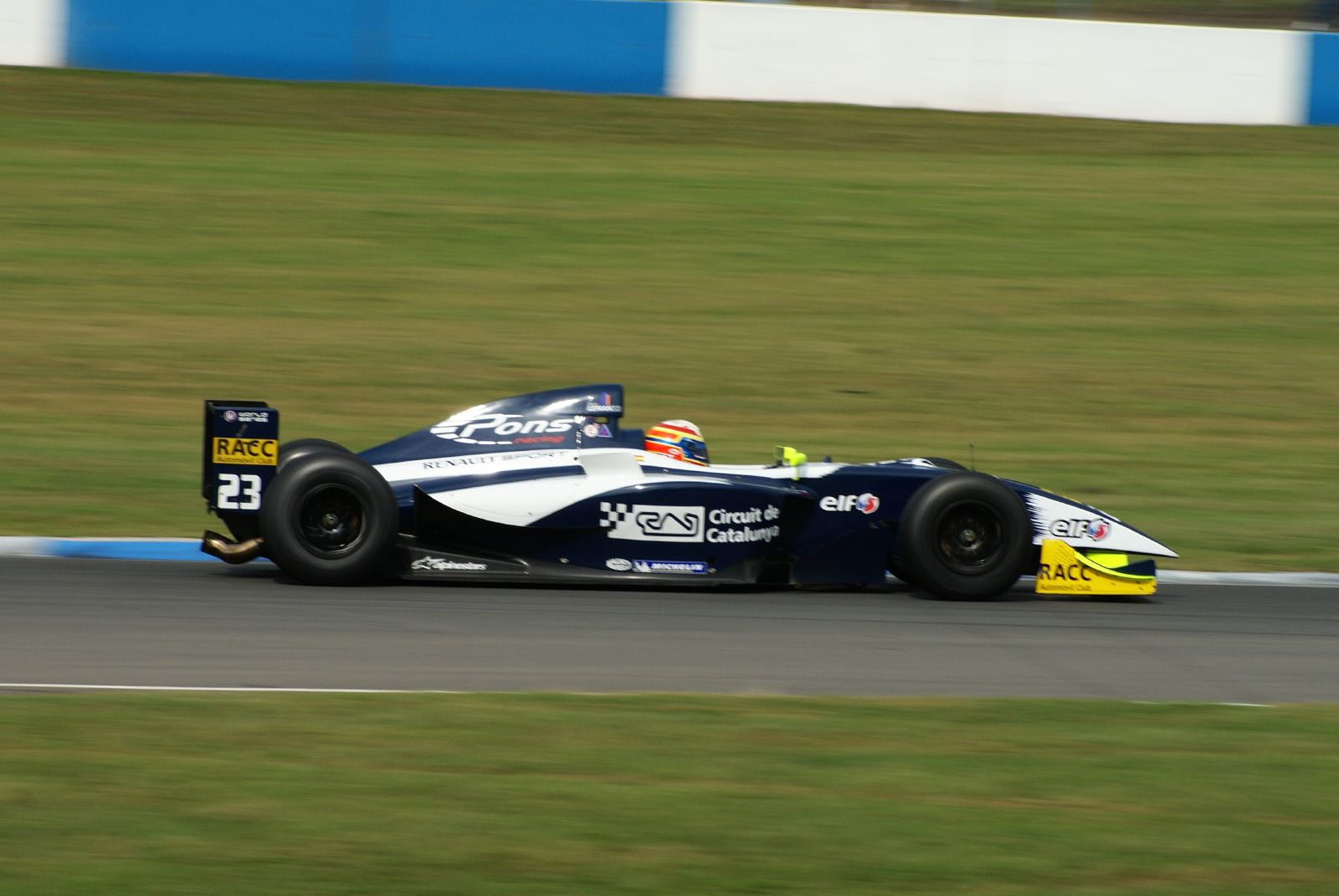
Miguel Molina during the 2007 Formula Renault 3.5 Series

=== 500cc (1992 - 2001) ===
2001

The year saw the arrival of new title sponsor in West cigarettes, replacing Emerson Electronics after just one year.

=== MotoGP (2002 - 2005) ===
==== 2002 ====
Both Barros and Capirossi remained in the team with the factory-spec NSR500 in the year where 990cc four-stroke machinery made their debut in the top class.

West Honda Pons had a solid season with the 500cc bikes where Barros scored two consecutive podiums in Assen and Donington Park, while Capirossi finished third in Welkom before suffered wrist injury in Assen. German Alex Hofmann filled Capirossi's seat in Donington and Sachsenring, finished 10th in his home race.

Alex Barros was given the four-stroke RC211V in the last four races of the season, the decision which paid off by finished in top three in those four races, two of them being a victory in Motegi and Valencia, ended the season in fourth place, eleven points behind second placed Max Biaggi. Capirossi scored another podium in Motegi, finished eighth in the final standings - the highest for a rider using a two-stroke machinery all year.

At the end of the season both riders left Honda Pons, along with title sponsor West.

==== 2003 ====
Honda Pons entered a new chapter in team's history, with R. J. Reynolds's Camel cigarettes became team's title sponsor. Max Biaggi joined the team from factory Yamaha team, while HRC moved Tohru Ukawa from Repsol Honda. Both riders rode the customer-spec RC211V.

Biaggi won 2 races in Donington Park (After Rossi got 10-seconds time penalty for yellow flag infringement) and Motegi en route to third place in the standings, while Ukawa ended the season in eight place before demoted to factory testing role with Honda, ended his full time Grand Prix career.

==== 2004 ====
Max Biaggi remained in the team, joined by Makoto Tamada as Pons and Pramac Racing collaborate as one team. Due to the agreement, Tamada raced with Bridgestone tires, while Biaggi remained with Michelin.

The team's technical director Antonio Cobas died in Barcelona just days before the opening round in South Africa. Max Biaggi finished the race in second place after battled with Valentino Rossi throughout the race. Camel Honda then won two races in a row in Brazil and Germany courtesy of Tamada and Biaggi respectively, with Tamada's victory was the first for Bridgestone in MotoGP. Tamada scored another win in Motegi en route to sixth place in the standings, while Biaggi ended the year in the same way he finished 2003, in third place.

==== 2005 ====
The agreement with Pramac ended as the company switched to D'Antin Racing as title sponsor, while Camel remained in the team. Alex Barros returned to the team after spending the last two seasons with Tech3 and Repsol Honda respectively, along with Troy Bayliss who left Ducati.

Barros winning in Portugal along with 11 top-10 finishes, finished 8th in the standings. Bayliss scored 5 top-10 finishes in 11 races, however his season was cut short when he injured his wrist in a motocross accident. Tohru Ukawa, Shane Byrne, Chris Vermeulen and Ryuichi Kiyonari filled Bayliss's seat for the remainder of the season. Both Barros and Bayliss moved to Superbike World Championship at the end of the season

Pons signed Carlos Checa and Australian rookie Casey Stoner for the 2006 season. However, the team lost their title sponsor Camel, who moved to Yamaha, forcing the team to withdraw from MotoGP after 25 seasons in the sport. Checa ended up moved to Tech 3, while Lucio Cecchinello's LCR Team secured the lease of one of the RC211V and signed Stoner.

== Results ==
=== Motorcycle racing ===
Year	Class	Team name	Motorcycle	Riders	Races	Wins	Podiums	Poles	F. laps	Points	Pos.
1992	500cc	Campsa Honda Pons	Honda NSR500	(Spain) Àlex Crivillé	13	1	1	0	0	59	8th
1993	500cc	Marlboro Honda Pons	Honda NSR500	(Spain) Àlex Crivillé	14	0	2	0	0	117	8th
1993	250cc	Marlboro Honda Pons	Honda NSR250	(Spain) Alberto Puig	14	0	2	0	0	106	9th
1994	500cc	Ducados Honda Pons	Honda NSR500	(Spain) Alberto Puig	14	0	1	0	0	152	5th
1995	500cc	Fortuna Honda Pons	Honda NSR500	(Spain) Alberto Puig	7	1	3	0	0	99	8th
1995	500cc	Fortuna Honda Pons	Honda NSR500	(Spain) Carlos Checa	5	0	0	0	1	26	16th
1995	250cc	Fortuna Honda Pons	Honda NSR250	(Spain) Carlos Checa	7	0	0	0	0	45	13th
1995	250cc	Fortuna Honda Pons	Honda NSR250	(Spain) Rubén Xaus	5	0	0	0	0	0	NC
1995	250cc	Fortuna Honda Pons	Honda NSR250	(Spain) Sete Gibernau	1	0	0	0	0	0	NC
1996	500cc	Fortuna Honda Pons	Honda NSR500	(Spain) Alberto Puig	14	0	1	0	0	93	11th
1996	500cc	Fortuna Honda Pons	Honda NSR500	(Spain) Carlos Checa	14	1	3	0	1	124	8th
1997	500cc	Movistar Honda Pons	Honda NSR500	(Spain) Alberto Puig	15	0	0	0	0	63	12th
1997	500cc	Movistar Honda Pons	Honda NSR500	(Spain) Carlos Checa	15	0	3	0	1	119	8th
1998	500cc	Movistar Honda Pons	Honda NSR500	(Spain) Carlos Checa	11	1	3	1	1	139	4th
1998	500cc	Movistar Honda Pons	Honda NSR500	(United States) John Kocinski	11	0	0	0	0	64	12th
1998	500cc	Movistar Honda Pons	Honda NSR500	(Spain) Juan Borja	1 (12) (Note: Non-bracketed number refers to the number accumulated with team, with number in brackets referring to the total accumulated for the season.)	0	0	0	0	0 (3)	32nd
1998	500cc	Movistar Honda Pons	Honda NSR500	(Spain) Gregorio Lavilla	1	0	0	0	0	5	27th
1999	500cc	Movistar Honda Pons	Honda NSR500	(Brazil) Alex Barros	16	0	1	0	2	110	9th
1999	500cc	Movistar Honda Pons	Honda NSR500	(Spain) Juan Borja	16	0	0	0	0	92	12th
2000	500cc	Emerson Honda Pons	Honda NSR500	(Brazil) Alex Barros	16	2	3	3	1	163	4th
2000	500cc	Emerson Honda Pons	Honda NSR500	(Italy) Loris Capirossi	16	1	4	1	2	154	7th
2001	500cc	West Honda Pons	Honda NSR500	(Brazil) Alex Barros	16	1	4	0	0	182	4th
2001	500cc	West Honda Pons	Honda NSR500	(Italy) Loris Capirossi	16	0	9	4	1	210	3rd
2002	MotoGP	West Honda Pons	Honda NSR500; Honda RC211V	(Brazil) Alex Barros	16	2	6	1	2	204	4th
2002	MotoGP	West Honda Pons	Honda NSR500; Honda RC211V	(Italy) Loris Capirossi	14	0	2	0	0	109	8th
2002	MotoGP	West Honda Pons	Honda NSR500; Honda RC211V	(Germany) Alex Hofmann	2 (4)	0	0	0	0	6 (11)	22nd
2003	MotoGP	Camel Pramac Pons	Honda RC211V	(Italy) Max Biaggi	16	2	9	3	1	228	3rd
2003	MotoGP	Camel Pramac Pons	Honda RC211V	(Japan) Tohru Ukawa	16	0	0	0	0	123	8th
2004	MotoGP	Camel Honda	Honda RC211V	(Italy) Max Biaggi	16	1	9	1	3	217	3rd
2004	MotoGP	Camel Honda	Honda RC211V	(Japan) Makoto Tamada	16	2	3	3	2	150	6th
2005	MotoGP	Camel Honda	Honda RC211V	(Brazil) Alex Barros	17	1	2	1	2	147	8th
2005	MotoGP	Camel Honda	Honda RC211V	(Australia) Troy Bayliss	11	0	0	0	0	54	15th
2005	MotoGP	Camel Honda	Honda RC211V	(Australia) Chris Vermeulen	2	0	0	0	0	10	21st
2005	MotoGP	Camel Honda	Honda RC211V	(United Kingdom) Shane Byrne	2 (11)	0	0	0	0	5 (6)	24th
2005	MotoGP	Camel Honda	Honda RC211V	(Japan) Ryuichi Kiyonari	1	0	0	0	0	4	25th
2005	MotoGP	Camel Honda	Honda RC211V	(Japan) Tohru Ukawa	1 (2)	0	0	0	0	0 (1)	27th
2009	250cc	Pepe World Team	Aprilia RSA 250	(Spain) Héctor Barberá	16	3	7	4	1	239	2nd
2009	250cc	Pepe World Team	Aprilia RSW 250 LE	(Spain) Axel Pons	16	0	0	0	0	3	26th
2010	Moto2	Tenerife 40 Pons	Kalex Moto2	(Spain) Sergio Gadea	17	0	1	0	0	67	17th
2010	Moto2	Tenerife 40 Pons	Kalex Moto2	(Spain) Axel Pons	14	0	0	0	0	7	33rd
2010	Moto2	Tenerife 40 Pons	Kalex Moto2	(Spain) Carmelo Morales	1 (3)	0	0	0	0	0	NC
2010	Moto2	Tenerife 40 Pons	Kalex Moto2	(Australia) Damian Cudlin	1	0	0	0	0	9	31st
2011	Moto2	Pons HP 40	Kalex Moto2	(Spain) Aleix Espargaró	17	0	1	0	0	76	12th
2011	Moto2	Pons HP 40	Kalex Moto2	(Spain) Axel Pons	12	0	0	0	0	1	32nd
2011	Moto2	Pons HP 40	Kalex Moto2	(Italy) Alex Baldolini	3 (14)	0	0	0	0	0 (18)	27th
2012	Moto2	Pons 40 HP Tuenti Tuenti Móvil HP 40	Kalex Moto2	(Spain) Pol Espargaró	17	4	11	8	3	268	2nd
2012	Moto2	Pons 40 HP Tuenti Tuenti Móvil HP 40	Kalex Moto2	(Spain) Esteve Rabat	17	0	1	0	0	114	7th
2012	Moto2	Pons 40 HP Tuenti Tuenti Móvil HP 40	Kalex Moto2	(Spain) Axel Pons	17	0	0	0	0	10	25th
2013	Moto2	Tuenti HP 40	Kalex Moto2	(Spain) Pol Espargaró	17	6	10	6	4	265	1st
2013	Moto2	Tuenti HP 40	Kalex Moto2	(Spain) Esteve Rabat	17	3	7	2	3	216	3rd
2013	Moto2	Tuenti HP 40	Kalex Moto2	(Spain) Axel Pons	17	0	0	0	0	6	25th
2014	Moto2	Pons HP 40 Paginas Amarillas HP 40	Kalex Moto2	(Spain) Luis Salom	18	0	2	0	1	85	8th
2014	Moto2	Pons HP 40 Paginas Amarillas HP 40	Kalex Moto2	(Spain) Maverick Viñales	18	4	9	1	5	274	3rd
2014	Moto2	Pons HP 40 Paginas Amarillas HP 40	Kalex Moto2	(Spain) Edgar Pons	1	0	0	0	0	0	NC
2015	Moto2	Paginas Amarillas HP 40	Kalex Moto2	(Spain) Luis Salom	17	0	0	0	0	80	13th
2015	Moto2	Paginas Amarillas HP 40	Kalex Moto2	(Spain) Álex Rins	18	2	10	3	4	234	2nd
2015	Moto2	Pons Racing Junior Team	Kalex Moto2	(Spain) Edgar Pons	3 (8)	0	0	0	0	0	NC
2015	Moto2	Pons Racing Junior Team	Kalex Moto2	(Italy) Luca Marini	1	0	0	0	0	0	NC
2016	Moto2	Páginas Amarillas HP 40	Kalex Moto2	(Spain) Álex Rins	18	2	7	1	3	214	3rd
2016	Moto2	Páginas Amarillas HP 40	Kalex Moto2	(Spain) Edgar Pons	14	0	0	0	0	4	31st
2017	Moto2	Pons HP40	Kalex Moto2	(France) Fabio Quartararo	18	0	0	0	0	64	13th
2017	Moto2	Pons HP40	Kalex Moto2	(Spain) Edgar Pons	18	0	0	0	0	2	34th
2018	Moto2	Pons HP40	Kalex Moto2	(Italy) Lorenzo Baldassarri	19	1	5	2	3	162	5th
2018	Moto2	Pons HP40	Kalex Moto2	(Spain) Héctor Barberá	6	0	0	0	0	10	23rd
2018	Moto2	Pons HP40	Kalex Moto2	(Spain) Augusto Fernández	12	0	0	0	1	45	18th
2019	Moto2	Flexbox HP40	Kalex Moto2	(Italy) Lorenzo Baldassarri	19	3	3	0	1	171	7th
2019	Moto2	Flexbox HP40	Kalex Moto2	(Spain) Augusto Fernández	17	3	5	1	3	207	5th
2019	Moto2	Flexbox HP40	Kalex Moto2	(Italy) Mattia Pasini	10 (11)	0	0	0	0	20	35th
2019	MotoE	Join Contract Pons 40	Energica Ego Corsa	(Spain) Sete Gibernau	6	0	0	0	0	38	11th
2020	Moto2	Flexbox HP40	Kalex Moto2	(Italy) Lorenzo Baldassarri	15	0	1	0	0	71	12th
2020	Moto2	Flexbox HP40	Kalex Moto2	(Spain) Héctor Garzó	15	0	1	0	2	63	16th
2020	MotoE	Pons Racing 40	Energica Ego Corsa	(Spain) Jordi Torres	7	1	4	2	1	114	1st
2021	Moto2	Flexbox HP40	Kalex Moto2	(Spain) Héctor Garzó	16	0	0	0	0	16	23rd
2021	Moto2	Flexbox HP40	Kalex Moto2	(Italy) Stefano Manzi	18	0	0	0	0	36	19th
2021	Moto2	Flexbox HP40	Kalex Moto2	(Spain) Alonso López	1 (4)	0	0	0	0	4	30th
2021	MotoE	Pons Racing 40; HP Pons 40	Energica Ego Corsa	(Spain) Jordi Torres	7	1	4	1	0	100	1st
2021	MotoE	Pons Racing 40; HP Pons 40	Energica Ego Corsa	(Netherlands) Jasper Iwema	7	0	0	0	0	13	17th
2022	Moto2	Flexbox HP40	Kalex Moto2	(Spain) Jorge Navarro	18	0	1	0	0	83	14th
2022	Moto2	Flexbox HP40	Kalex Moto2	(Spain) Arón Canet	19	0	8	3	2	200	3rd
2022	Moto2	Flexbox HP40	Kalex Moto2	(Spain) Borja Gómez	2	0	0	0	0	4	31st
2022	MotoE	Pons Racing 40	Energica Ego Corsa	(Italy) Mattia Casadei	12	2	7	2	1	156	4th
2022	MotoE	Pons Racing 40	Energica Ego Corsa	(Spain) Jordi Torres	9	0	0	0	0	65	11th
2022	MotoE	Pons Racing 40	Energica Ego Corsa	(Italy) Massimo Roccoli	2	0	0	0	0	6	21st
2023	Moto2	Pons Wegow Los40	Kalex Moto2	(Spain) Sergio García	20	0	0	0	0	84	15th
2023	Moto2	Pons Wegow Los40	Kalex Moto2	(Spain) Arón Canet	20	0	7	3	0	195	5th
2023	MotoE	HP Pons Los40	Ducati V21L	(Italy) Nicholas Spinelli	16	1	4	0	0	150	6th
2023	MotoE	HP Pons Los40	Ducati V21L	(Italy) Mattia Casadei	16	5	10	2	4	260	1st

=== Formula Renault 3.5 Series ===
Year	Team name	Drivers	Races	Wins	Podiums	Poles	F. laps	Points	Pos.
2013	(Spain) Pons Racing	(Switzerland) Zoël Amberg	17	0	0	0	0	8	24th
2013	(Spain) Pons Racing	(Russia) Nikolay Martsenko	17	0	0	0	0	20	20th
2014	(Spain) Pons Racing	(United Kingdom) Oliver Webb	5	0	0	0	0	0	26th
2014	(Spain) Pons Racing	(Netherlands) Meindert van Buuren	17	0	0	0	1	21	19th
2014	(Spain) Pons Racing	(Colombia) Óscar Tunjo	12	0	0	0	0	11	22nd
2015	(Spain) Pons Racing	(Indonesia) Philo Paz Armand	9	0	0	0	0	1	26th
2015	(Spain) Pons Racing	(Spain) Roberto Merhi	8	0	1	0	0	26	14th
2015	(Spain) Pons Racing	(Switzerland) Alex Fontana	1	0	0	0	0	2	24th
2015	(Spain) Pons Racing	(Netherlands) Meindert van Buuren	2 (9) (Note: Non-bracketed number refers to the number accumulated with team, with number in brackets referring to the total accumulated for the season.)	0	0	0	0 (1)	0 (20)	15th
2015	(Spain) Pons Racing	(United Kingdom) Will Bratt	2	0	0	0	0	0	27th
2015	(Spain) Pons Racing	(Japan) Yu Kanamaru	6	0	0	0	0	9	18th
2015	(Spain) Pons Racing	(Austria) René Binder	2	0	0	0	0	4	22nd
2015	(Spain) Pons Racing	(Russia) Nikita Zlobin	4	0	0	0	0	0	28th
