= V5 engine =

Five-cylinder piston engine arranged in a V configuration

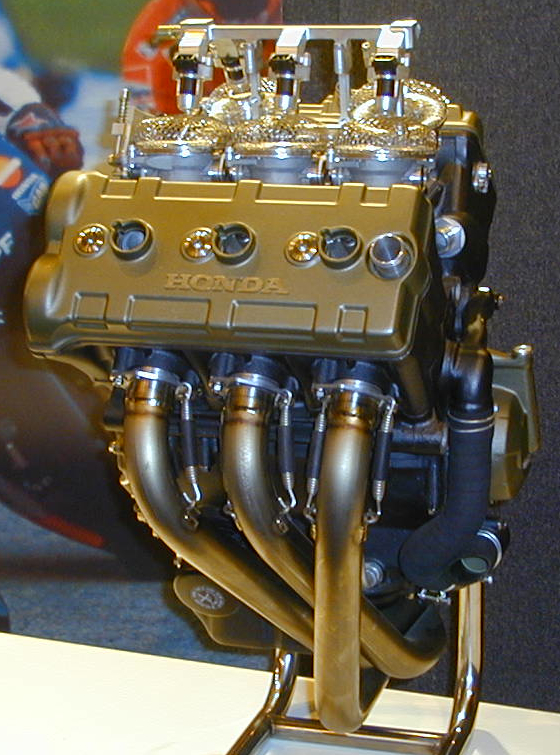
Honda V5 Moto GP Engine

A V5 engine is a five-cylinder piston engine where the cylinders share a common crankshaft and are arranged in a V configuration.

Even compared to the fairly rare straight-five engine, V5 engine designs are very uncommon. The first production V5 was the 1997–2007 Volkswagen Group VR5 engine. It is arguably not a true V5 engine, as all the cylinders share a single cylinder head. However, Honda produced a true V5 motorcycle racing engine, used in the RC211V.

== Automobiles ==
=== General Motors ===
In the early 1980s, Oldsmobile developed a prototype 2.5 L (153 cu in) V5 diesel engine, however it never reached production stages and the project was subsequently abandoned. The engine is based on the Oldsmobile V6 diesel engine with the fuel injection pump in the location of the "missing" sixth cylinder. A prototype engine is on display at the RE Olds Museum in Lansing, Michigan.

=== Volkswagen Group ===
The only V5 automobile engine to reach production was the 2.3 L (140 cu in) "VR5" engine manufactured by Volkswagen from 1997 to 2006. Based on Volkswagen's VR6 engine, the VR5 was a narrow-angle engine with staggered cylinders (three cylinders on one bank and two on the other) sharing a single cylinder head. As per the VR6 engine, the angle between the banks was 15 degrees. Initial versions used 2 valves per cylinder, however, an update in 2000 resulted in a total of 4 valves per cylinder and the addition of variable valve timing.

== Motorcycles ==
=== Honda ===
The Honda RC211V, a MotoGP racing motorcycle which competed in the 2002–2006 seasons, used a V5 engine. The transversely-mounted 990 cc (60 cu in) engine had three cylinders at the front, two cylinders at the rear and a V-angle of 75.5 degrees. The engine used 4 valves per cylinder.

=== BSA ===
In the last days of the BSA motorcycle manufacturer, the factory design team produced plans for a modular range of four engines, all using a 200 cc cylinder. (It was planned to increase the cylinder capacity to up to 250 cc in due course). The range, which never went further than the drawing board, comprised:

- 200 cc single
- 400 cc parallel twin
- 600 cc triple
- 1,000 cc V5 muscle bike

== See also ==
- Straight-five engine
