= 2007 Qatar motorcycle Grand Prix =

2007 Qatar Grand Prix
Race details
- Race 1 of 18 races in the 2007 Grand Prix motorcycle racing season
- Date: 10 March 2007
- Official name: Commercialbank Grand Prix of Qatar
- Location: Losail International Circuit
- Course: Permanent racing facility; 5.380 km (3.343 mi)

MotoGP
Pole position
- Rider: (Italy) Valentino Rossi
- Time: 1:55.002
Fastest lap
- Rider: (Australia) Casey Stoner
- Time: 1:56.528
Podium
- First: (Australia) Casey Stoner
- Second: (Italy) Valentino Rossi
- Third: (Spain) Dani Pedrosa

250cc
Pole position
- Rider: (Spain) Jorge Lorenzo
- Time: 1:59.432
Fastest lap
- Rider: (San Marino) Alex de Angelis
- Time: 2:00.121
Podium
- First: (Spain) Jorge Lorenzo
- Second: (San Marino) Alex de Angelis
- Third: (Spain) Héctor Barberá

125cc
Pole position
- Rider: (Hungary) Gábor Talmácsi
- Time: 2:06.011
Fastest lap
- Rider: (Hungary) Gábor Talmácsi
- Time: 2:06.267
Podium
- First: (Spain) Héctor Faubel
- Second: (Hungary) Gábor Talmácsi
- Third: (Czech Republic) Lukáš Pešek

The 2007 Qatar motorcycle Grand Prix was the opening round of the 2007 MotoGP championship. It took place on the weekend of 8–10 March 2007 at the 5.38 km Losail International Circuit in Qatar.

The MotoGP race was the first for the 800cc (48.8 cu in) engines and the Honda RC212V. These were brought in as replacements for the 990cc (60.4 cu in) engines and the Honda RC211V which were used since the beginning of the four-stroke era back in 2002.

== MotoGP classification ==
Pos.	No.	Rider	Team	Manufacturer	Laps	Time/Retired	Grid	Points
1	27	(Australia) Casey Stoner	Ducati Marlboro Team	Ducati	22	43:02.788	2	25
2	46	(Italy) Valentino Rossi	Fiat Yamaha Team	Yamaha	22	+2.838	1	20
3	26	(Spain) Dani Pedrosa	Repsol Honda Team	Honda	22	+8.530	5	16
4	21	(United States) John Hopkins	Rizla Suzuki MotoGP	Suzuki	22	+9.071	6	13
5	33	(Italy) Marco Melandri	Honda Gresini	Honda	22	+17.433	10	11
6	5	(United States) Colin Edwards	Fiat Yamaha Team	Yamaha	22	+18.647	3	10
7	71	(Australia) Chris Vermeulen	Rizla Suzuki MotoGP	Suzuki	22	+22.916	13	9
8	1	(United States) Nicky Hayden	Repsol Honda Team	Honda	22	+23.057	9	8
9	4	(Brazil) Alex Barros	Pramac d'Antin	Ducati	22	+25.961	15	7
10	56	(Japan) Shinya Nakano	Konica Minolta Honda	Honda	22	+28.456	11	6
11	66	(Germany) Alex Hofmann	Pramac d'Antin	Ducati	22	+35.029	17	5
12	19	(France) Olivier Jacque	Kawasaki Racing Team	Kawasaki	22	+42.948	14	4
13	10	(United States) Kenny Roberts Jr.	Team Roberts	KR212V	22	+42.977	18	3
14	24	(Spain) Toni Elías	Honda Gresini	Honda	22	+42.989	4	2
15	50	(France) Sylvain Guintoli	Dunlop Yamaha Tech 3	Yamaha	22	+51.639	16	1
16	6	(Japan) Makoto Tamada	Dunlop Yamaha Tech 3	Yamaha	22	+57.853	19	
Ret	88	(Australia) Andrew Pitt	Ilmor GP	Ilmor GP	15	Retirement	21	
Ret	7	(Spain) Carlos Checa	Honda LCR	Honda	8	Accident	12	
Ret	14	(France) Randy de Puniet	Kawasaki Racing Team	Kawasaki	7	Accident	8	
Ret	65	(Italy) Loris Capirossi	Ducati Marlboro Team	Ducati	6	Accident	7	
DNS	99	(United Kingdom) Jeremy McWilliams	Ilmor GP	Ilmor GP	0	Did not start	20	

== 250 cc classification ==
Pos.	No.	Rider	Manufacturer	Laps	Time/Retired	Grid	Points
1	1	(Spain) Jorge Lorenzo	Aprilia	20	40:23.753	1	25
2	3	(San Marino) Alex de Angelis	Aprilia	20	+1.224	3	20
3	80	(Spain) Héctor Barberá	Aprilia	20	+2.911	2	16
4	12	(Switzerland) Thomas Lüthi	Aprilia	20	+3.234	5	13
5	34	(Italy) Andrea Dovizioso	Honda	20	+12.698	7	11
6	15	(Italy) Roberto Locatelli	Gilera	20	+21.568	11	10
7	55	(Japan) Yuki Takahashi	Honda	20	+31.540	9	9
8	60	(Spain) Julián Simón	Honda	20	+40.467	10	8
9	58	(Italy) Marco Simoncelli	Gilera	20	+46.192	12	7
10	73	(Japan) Shuhei Aoyama	Honda	20	+58.678	13	6
11	41	(Spain) Aleix Espargaró	Aprilia	20	+1:02.762	16	5
12	32	(Italy) Fabrizio Lai	Aprilia	20	+1:07.715	14	4
13	14	(Australia) Anthony West	Aprilia	20	+1:10.622	17	3
14	8	(Thailand) Ratthapark Wilairot	Honda	20	+1:11.594	22	2
15	28	(Germany) Dirk Heidolf	Aprilia	20	+1:12.499	18	1
16	16	(France) Jules Cluzel	Aprilia	20	+1:23.751	23	
17	25	(Italy) Alex Baldolini	Aprilia	20	+1:33.143	20	
18	50	(Republic of Ireland) Eugene Laverty	Honda	20	+1:38.458	24	
19	10	(Hungary) Imre Tóth	Aprilia	20	+1:38.548	19	
Ret	36	(Finland) Mika Kallio	KTM	18	Retirement	8	
Ret	9	(Spain) Arturo Tizón	Aprilia	14	Retirement	15	
Ret	44	(Japan) Taro Sekiguchi	Aprilia	10	Retirement	25	
Ret	17	(Czech Republic) Karel Abraham	Aprilia	7	Accident	21	
Ret	19	(Spain) Álvaro Bautista	Aprilia	2	Accident	4	
Ret	4	(Japan) Hiroshi Aoyama	KTM	2	Accident	6	
OFFICIAL 250cc REPORT

== 125 cc classification ==
Pos.	No.	Rider	Manufacturer	Laps	Time/Retired	Grid	Points
1	55	(Spain) Héctor Faubel	Aprilia	18	38:12.029	2	25
2	14	(Hungary) Gábor Talmácsi	Aprilia	18	+0.073	1	20
3	52	(Czech Republic) Lukáš Pešek	Derbi	18	+17.499	4	16
4	35	(Italy) Raffaele De Rosa	Aprilia	18	+17.754	5	13
5	24	(Italy) Simone Corsi	Aprilia	18	+25.642	10	11
6	71	(Japan) Tomoyoshi Koyama	KTM	18	+25.877	7	10
7	44	(Spain) Pol Espargaró	Aprilia	18	+28.437	12	9
8	12	(Spain) Esteve Rabat	Honda	18	+28.527	8	8
9	22	(Spain) Pablo Nieto	Aprilia	18	+28.708	11	7
10	7	(France) Alexis Masbou	Honda	18	+33.669	15	6
11	6	(Spain) Joan Olivé	Aprilia	18	+40.665	20	5
12	38	(United Kingdom) Bradley Smith	Honda	18	+40.679	9	4
13	60	(Austria) Michael Ranseder	Derbi	18	+40.915	13	3
14	63	(France) Mike Di Meglio	Honda	18	+41.671	18	2
15	29	(Italy) Andrea Iannone	Aprilia	18	+41.764	14	1
16	18	(Spain) Nicolás Terol	Derbi	18	+48.643	19	
17	11	(Germany) Sandro Cortese	Aprilia	18	+48.656	21	
18	8	(Italy) Lorenzo Zanetti	Aprilia	18	+48.858	28	
19	34	(Switzerland) Randy Krummenacher	KTM	18	+1:03.160	17	
20	77	(Switzerland) Dominique Aegerter	Aprilia	18	+1:23.074	27	
21	37	(Netherlands) Joey Litjens	Honda	18	+1:23.147	25	
22	51	(United States) Stevie Bonsey	KTM	18	+1:31.521	29	
23	20	(Italy) Roberto Tamburini	Aprilia	18	+1:59.152	30	
24	56	(Netherlands) Hugo van den Berg	Aprilia	18	+2:00.040	31	
Ret	99	(United Kingdom) Danny Webb	Honda	16	Retirement	26	
Ret	75	(Italy) Mattia Pasini	Aprilia	15	Retirement	3	
Ret	27	(Italy) Stefano Bianco	Aprilia	14	Retirement	16	
Ret	33	(Spain) Sergio Gadea	Aprilia	12	Retirement	6	
Ret	53	(Italy) Simone Grotzkyj	Aprilia	7	Retirement	23	
Ret	15	(Italy) Federico Sandi	Aprilia	4	Retirement	22	
Ret	95	(Romania) Robert Mureșan	Derbi	3	Retirement	24	
OFFICIAL 125cc REPORT

== Championship standings after the race (MotoGP) ==
Below are the standings for the top five riders and constructors after round one has concluded.

Riders' Championship standings

Pos.	Rider	Points
1	(Australia) Casey Stoner	25
2	(Italy) Valentino Rossi	20
3	(Spain) Dani Pedrosa	16
4	(United States) John Hopkins	13
5	(Italy) Marco Melandri	11

Constructors' Championship standings

Pos.	Constructor	Points
1	(Italy) Ducati	25
2	(Japan) Yamaha	20
3	(Japan) Honda	16
4	(Japan) Suzuki	13
5	(Japan) Kawasaki	4

- Note: Only the top five positions are included for both sets of standings.

Previous race: 2006 Valencian Grand Prix	FIM Grand Prix World Championship; 2007 season	Next race: 2007 Spanish Grand Prix
Previous race: 2006 Qatar Grand Prix	Qatar motorcycle Grand Prix	Next race: 2008 Qatar Grand Prix
