= 2006 Valencian Community motorcycle Grand Prix =

2006 Valencian Community Grand Prix
Race details
- Race 17 of 17 races in the 2006 Grand Prix motorcycle racing season
- Date: 29 October 2006
- Official name: Gran Premio bwin.com de la Comunitat Valenciana
- Location: Circuit Ricardo Tormo
- Course: Permanent racing facility; 4.005 km (2.489 mi)

MotoGP
Pole position
- Rider: (Italy) Valentino Rossi
- Time: 1:31.002
Fastest lap
- Rider: (Italy) Loris Capirossi
- Time: 1:32.924
Podium
- First: (Australia) Troy Bayliss
- Second: (Italy) Loris Capirossi
- Third: (United States) Nicky Hayden

250cc
Pole position
- Rider: (Japan) Hiroshi Aoyama
- Time: 1:35.109
Fastest lap
- Rider: (San Marino) Alex de Angelis
- Time: 1:36.441
Podium
- First: (San Marino) Alex de Angelis
- Second: (Italy) Roberto Locatelli
- Third: (Spain) Héctor Barberá

125cc
Pole position
- Rider: (Spain) Álvaro Bautista
- Time: 1:39.058
Fastest lap
- Rider: (Spain) Héctor Faubel
- Time: 1:39.574
Podium
- First: (Spain) Héctor Faubel
- Second: (Finland) Mika Kallio
- Third: (Spain) Sergio Gadea

The 2006 Valencian Community motorcycle Grand Prix was the last race of the 2006 Motorcycle Grand Prix season. It took place on the weekend of 27–29 October 2006 at the Circuit Ricardo Tormo. The MotoGP riders' championship was decided at this race, as Nicky Hayden's third place ensured he completed the season with more points than his rival, and polesitter for the race, Valentino Rossi, who finished down in thirteenth after he fell during the race.

The race was also notable for two lasts; the last race with the 990cc (60.4 cu in) engines which débuted in 2002, and the last race for the Honda RC211V, as the engines switched to 800cc (48.8 cu in) in capacity and Honda would field the RC212V from 2007.

== MotoGP classification ==
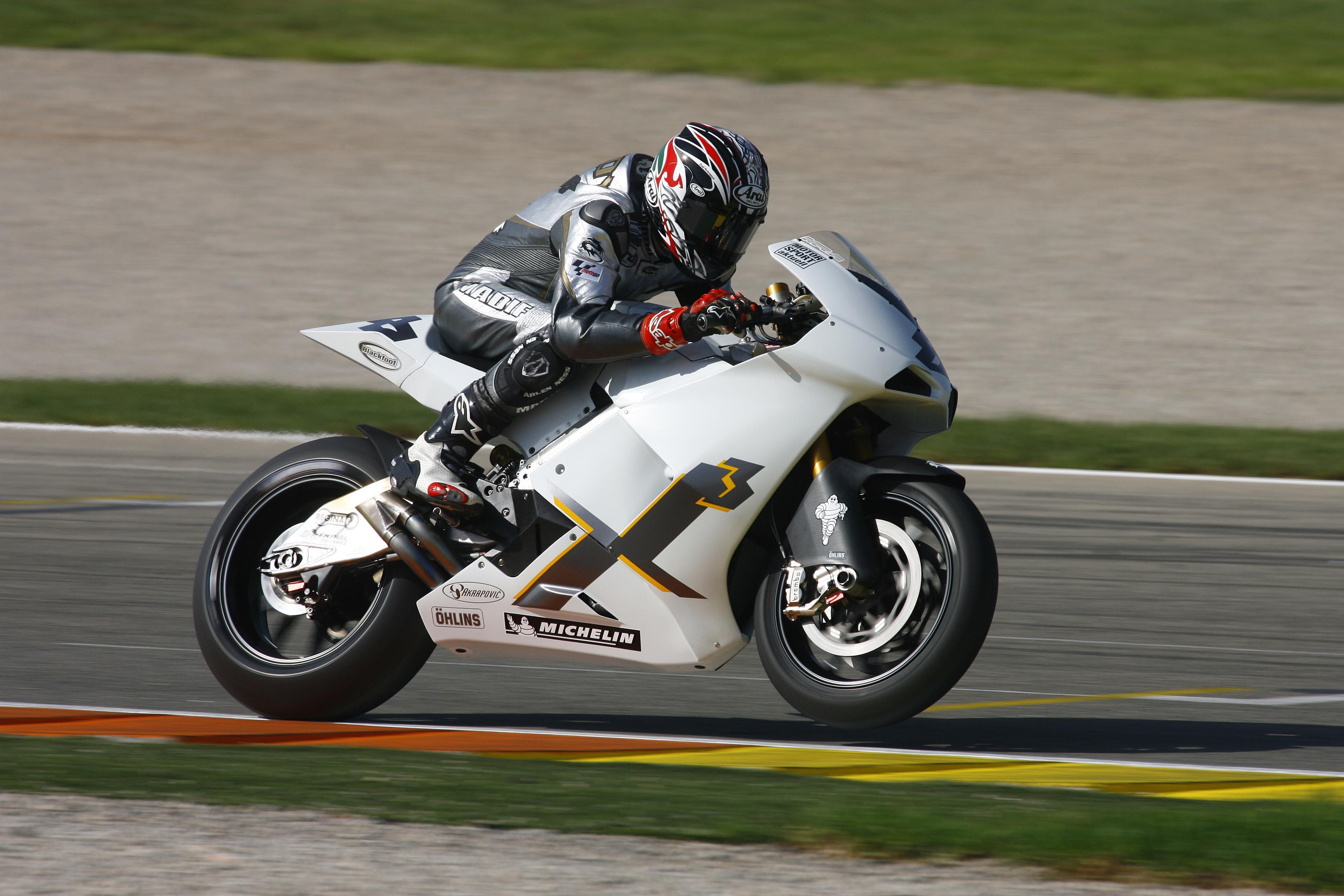
Garry McCoy, riding for Ilmor, finished the MotoGP race in fifteenth position.

Pos.	No.	Rider	Team	Manufacturer	Laps	Time/Retired	Grid	Points
1	12	(Australia) Troy Bayliss	Ducati Marlboro Team	Ducati	30	46:55.415	2	25
2	65	(Italy) Loris Capirossi	Ducati Marlboro Team	Ducati	30	+1.319	3	20
3	69	(United States) Nicky Hayden	Repsol Honda Team	Honda	30	+9.230	5	16
4	26	(Spain) Dani Pedrosa	Repsol Honda Team	Honda	30	+12.065	6	13
5	33	(Italy) Marco Melandri	Fortuna Honda	Honda	30	+16.306	12	11
6	24	(Spain) Toni Elías	Fortuna Honda	Honda	30	+17.390	13	10
7	56	(Japan) Shinya Nakano	Kawasaki Racing Team	Kawasaki	30	+19.329	4	9
8	10	(United States) Kenny Roberts Jr.	Team Roberts	KR211V	30	+23.174	14	8
9	5	(United States) Colin Edwards	Camel Yamaha Team	Yamaha	30	+26.072	10	7
10	7	(Spain) Carlos Checa	Tech 3 Yamaha	Yamaha	30	+28.194	16	6
11	21	(United States) John Hopkins	Rizla Suzuki MotoGP	Suzuki	30	+29.364	9	5
12	6	(Japan) Makoto Tamada	Konica Minolta Honda	Honda	30	+29.707	15	4
13	46	(Italy) Valentino Rossi	Camel Yamaha Team	Yamaha	30	+38.546	1	3
14	77	(United Kingdom) James Ellison	Tech 3 Yamaha	Yamaha	30	+1:20.013	19	2
15	8	(Australia) Garry McCoy	Ilmor SRT	Ilmor X3	23	+7 laps	20	1
Ret	27	(Australia) Casey Stoner	Honda LCR	Honda	23	Accident	7	
Ret	71	(Australia) Chris Vermeulen	Rizla Suzuki MotoGP	Suzuki	13	Accident	8	
Ret	30	(Spain) José Luis Cardoso	Pramac d'Antin MotoGP	Ducati	12	Retirement	18	
Ret	66	(Germany) Alex Hofmann	Pramac d'Antin MotoGP	Ducati	9	Accident	17	
Ret	17	(France) Randy de Puniet	Kawasaki Racing Team	Kawasaki	5	Accident	11	

== 250 cc classification ==
Pos.	No.	Rider	Manufacturer	Laps	Time/Retired	Grid	Points
1	7	(San Marino) Alex de Angelis	Aprilia	27	43:52.247	3	25
2	15	(Italy) Roberto Locatelli	Aprilia	27	+4.524	4	20
3	80	(Spain) Héctor Barberá	Aprilia	27	+9.551	6	16
4	48	(Spain) Jorge Lorenzo	Aprilia	27	+11.366	2	13
5	6	(Spain) Alex Debón	Aprilia	27	+14.957	10	11
6	73	(Japan) Shuhei Aoyama	Honda	27	+17.621	8	10
7	34	(Italy) Andrea Dovizioso	Honda	27	+18.505	7	9
8	54	(San Marino) Manuel Poggiali	KTM	27	+18.846	11	8
9	52	(Spain) José David de Gea	Honda	27	+20.362	9	7
10	50	(France) Sylvain Guintoli	Aprilia	27	+24.257	13	6
11	96	(Czech Republic) Jakub Smrž	Aprilia	27	+36.071	12	5
12	25	(Italy) Alex Baldolini	Aprilia	27	+40.323	17	4
13	42	(Spain) Aleix Espargaró	Honda	27	+49.222	15	3
14	37	(Argentina) Fabricio Perren	Honda	27	+51.787	18	2
15	8	(Italy) Andrea Ballerini	Aprilia	27	+53.194	23	1
16	44	(Japan) Taro Sekiguchi	Aprilia	27	+57.940	21	
17	31	(Spain) Álvaro Molina	Aprilia	27	+1:16.334	19	
18	23	(Spain) Arturo Tizón	Honda	27	+1:29.704	22	
19	14	(Australia) Anthony West	Aprilia	27	+1:30.923	14	
20	65	(Italy) Alessandro Brannetti	Honda	27	+1:31.558	25	
21	57	(United Kingdom) Chaz Davies	Honda	27	+1:31.982	26	
22	24	(Spain) Jordi Carchano	Aprilia	26	+1 lap	24	
23	53	(Spain) Santiago Barragán	Honda	26	+1 lap	30	
24	22	(Italy) Luca Morelli	Aprilia	26	+1 lap	27	
Ret	4	(Japan) Hiroshi Aoyama	KTM	20	Accident	1	
Ret	58	(Italy) Marco Simoncelli	Gilera	12	Accident	5	
Ret	28	(Germany) Dirk Heidolf	Aprilia	10	Retirement	16	
Ret	45	(United Kingdom) Dan Linfoot	Honda	8	Retirement	29	
Ret	85	(Italy) Alessio Palumbo	Aprilia	4	Accident	28	
Ret	16	(France) Jules Cluzel	Aprilia	1	Retirement	20	
WD	55	(Japan) Yuki Takahashi	Honda		Withdrew		

== 125 cc classification ==
Pos.	No.	Rider	Manufacturer	Laps	Time/Retired	Grid	Points
1	55	(Spain) Héctor Faubel	Aprilia	24	40:15.460	2	25
2	36	(Finland) Mika Kallio	KTM	24	+1.764	5	20
3	33	(Spain) Sergio Gadea	Aprilia	24	+1.938	3	16
4	19	(Spain) Álvaro Bautista	Aprilia	24	+8.646	1	13
5	52	(Czech Republic) Lukáš Pešek	Derbi	24	+8.673	7	11
6	42	(Spain) Pol Espargaró	Derbi	24	+12.428	6	10
7	22	(Spain) Pablo Nieto	Aprilia	24	+18.925	19	9
8	14	(Hungary) Gábor Talmácsi	Honda	24	+22.058	12	8
9	75	(Italy) Mattia Pasini	Aprilia	24	+22.102	4	7
10	1	(Switzerland) Thomas Lüthi	Honda	24	+25.405	13	6
11	18	(Spain) Nicolás Terol	Derbi	24	+25.605	11	5
12	38	(United Kingdom) Bradley Smith	Honda	24	+28.700	23	4
13	34	(Spain) Esteve Rabat	Honda	24	+36.206	17	3
14	71	(Japan) Tomoyoshi Koyama	Malaguti	24	+41.651	18	2
15	8	(Italy) Lorenzo Zanetti	Aprilia	24	+41.748	20	1
16	21	(Spain) Mateo Túnez	Aprilia	24	+45.893	26	
17	20	(Italy) Roberto Tamburini	Aprilia	24	+46.005	22	
18	11	(Germany) Sandro Cortese	Honda	24	+47.510	9	
19	24	(Italy) Simone Corsi	Gilera	24	+52.287	16	
20	6	(Spain) Joan Olivé	Aprilia	24	+54.531	21	
21	43	(Spain) Manuel Hernández	Aprilia	24	+56.966	27	
22	12	(Italy) Federico Sandi	Aprilia	24	+57.995	24	
23	16	(Italy) Michele Conti	Honda	24	+1:01.336	35	
24	9	(Austria) Michael Ranseder	KTM	24	+1:02.918	28	
25	37	(Netherlands) Joey Litjens	Honda	24	+1:02.992	38	
26	30	(Spain) Pere Tutusaus	Derbi	24	+1:04.324	33	
27	90	(Japan) Hiroaki Kuzuhara	Aprilia	24	+1:07.021	30	
28	53	(Italy) Simone Grotzkyj	Aprilia	24	+1:08.649	29	
29	25	(Switzerland) Dominique Aegerter	Aprilia	24	+1:08.682	32	
30	49	(Japan) Kazuma Watanabe	Honda	24	+1:08.809	36	
31	13	(Italy) Dino Lombardi	Aprilia	24	+1:09.140	34	
32	67	(Australia) Blake Leigh-Smith	KTM	24	+1:19.944	42	
33	45	(Hungary) Imre Tóth	Aprilia	24	+1:20.568	31	
34	87	(Italy) Roberto Lacalendola	Aprilia	24	+1:31.922	43	
35	40	(Italy) Nico Vivarelli	Malaguti	24	+1:31.995	31	
36	77	(Spain) Daniel Sáez	Aprilia	24	+1:38.898	40	
37	83	(France) Clément Dunikowski	Honda	23	+1 lap	39	
Ret	32	(Italy) Fabrizio Lai	Honda	18	Retirement	14	
Ret	35	(Italy) Raffaele De Rosa	Aprilia	11	Retirement	25	
Ret	60	(Spain) Julián Simón	KTM	6	Accident	8	
Ret	44	(Czech Republic) Karel Abraham	Aprilia	6	Accident	15	
Ret	54	(Switzerland) Randy Krummenacher	KTM	5	Accident	10	
Ret	78	(Netherlands) Hugo van den Berg	Aprilia	3	Accident	37	

== Championship standings after the race (MotoGP) ==
Below are the standings for the top five riders and constructors after round sixteen has concluded.

Riders' Championship standings

Pos.	Rider	Points
1	(United States) Nicky Hayden	252
2	(Italy) Valentino Rossi	247
3	(Italy) Loris Capirossi	229
4	(Italy) Marco Melandri	228
5	(Spain) Dani Pedrosa	215

Constructors' Championship standings

Pos.	Constructor	Points
1	(Japan) Honda	360
2	(Japan) Yamaha	289
3	(Italy) Ducati	248
4	(Japan) Suzuki	151
5	(United States) KR211V	134

- Note: Only the top five positions are included for both sets of standings.

Previous race: 2006 Portuguese Grand Prix	FIM Grand Prix World Championship; 2006 season	Next race: 2007 Qatar Grand Prix
Previous race: 2005 Valencian Grand Prix	Valencian Community motorcycle Grand Prix	Next race: 2007 Valencian Grand Prix
