= Honda VTR1000F =

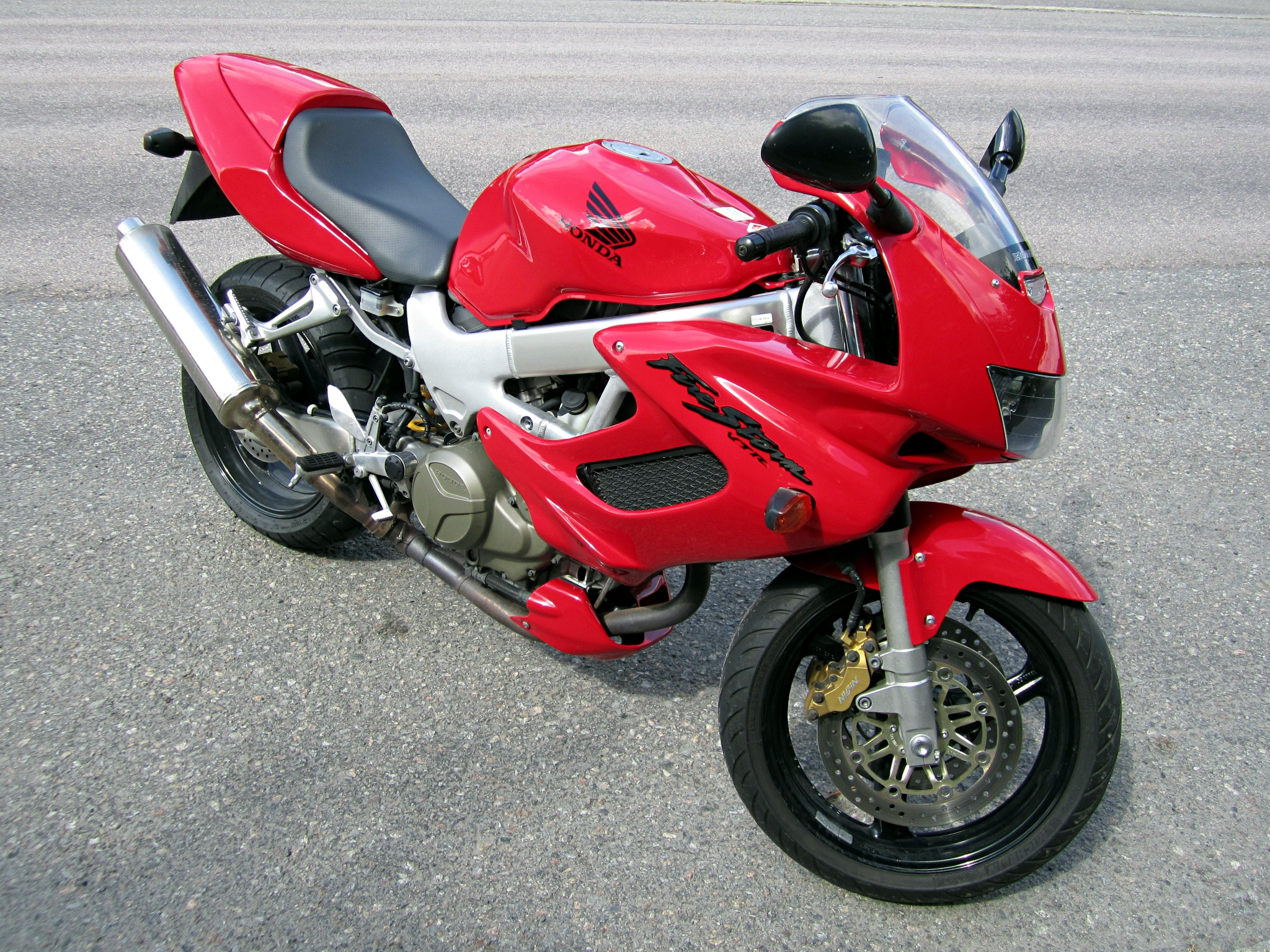
- Manufacturer: Honda
- Also called: SuperHawk, Firestorm
- Production: 1997–2005
- Class: Sport bike
- Engine: 996 cc (60.8 cu in) l/c 90° V-twin
- Bore / stroke: 98.0 mm × 66.0 mm (3.86 in × 2.60 in)
- Compression ratio: 9.4:1
- Top speed: 155 mph (249 km/h)
- Power: 116 hp (87 kW) (rear wheel)
- Torque: 64.9 lb⋅ft (88.0 N⋅m) (rear wheel)
- Ignition type: Computer-controlled digital transistorized with electronic advance
- Transmission: 6-speed manual, chain final drive
- Suspension: Front: 41mm H.M.A.S. cartridge-type fork with adjustable spring preload and rebound damping, 109mm axle travel Rear: Pro-Link with preload and rebound damping-adjustable gas-charged H.M.A.S. damper, 124mm axle travel
- Brakes: Front: Dual 296 mm discs, 4-piston Nissin calipers Rear: Single 220 mm disc, single-piston caliper
- Tires: Front: 120/70-ZR17 (58W) (Radial); Rear: 180/55-ZR17 (73W) (Radial)
- Wheelbase: 1,430 mm (56 in)
- Seat height: 810 mm (32 in)
- Weight: 426 lb (193 kg). (dry); 472 lb (214 kg) (wet)

The Honda VTR1000F (frame designation "SC36") was a 90° V-twin sport bike produced by Honda from 1997 to 2005. Known worldwide as the Firestorm, in the USA it was marketed as the SuperHawk.

== Innovation ==
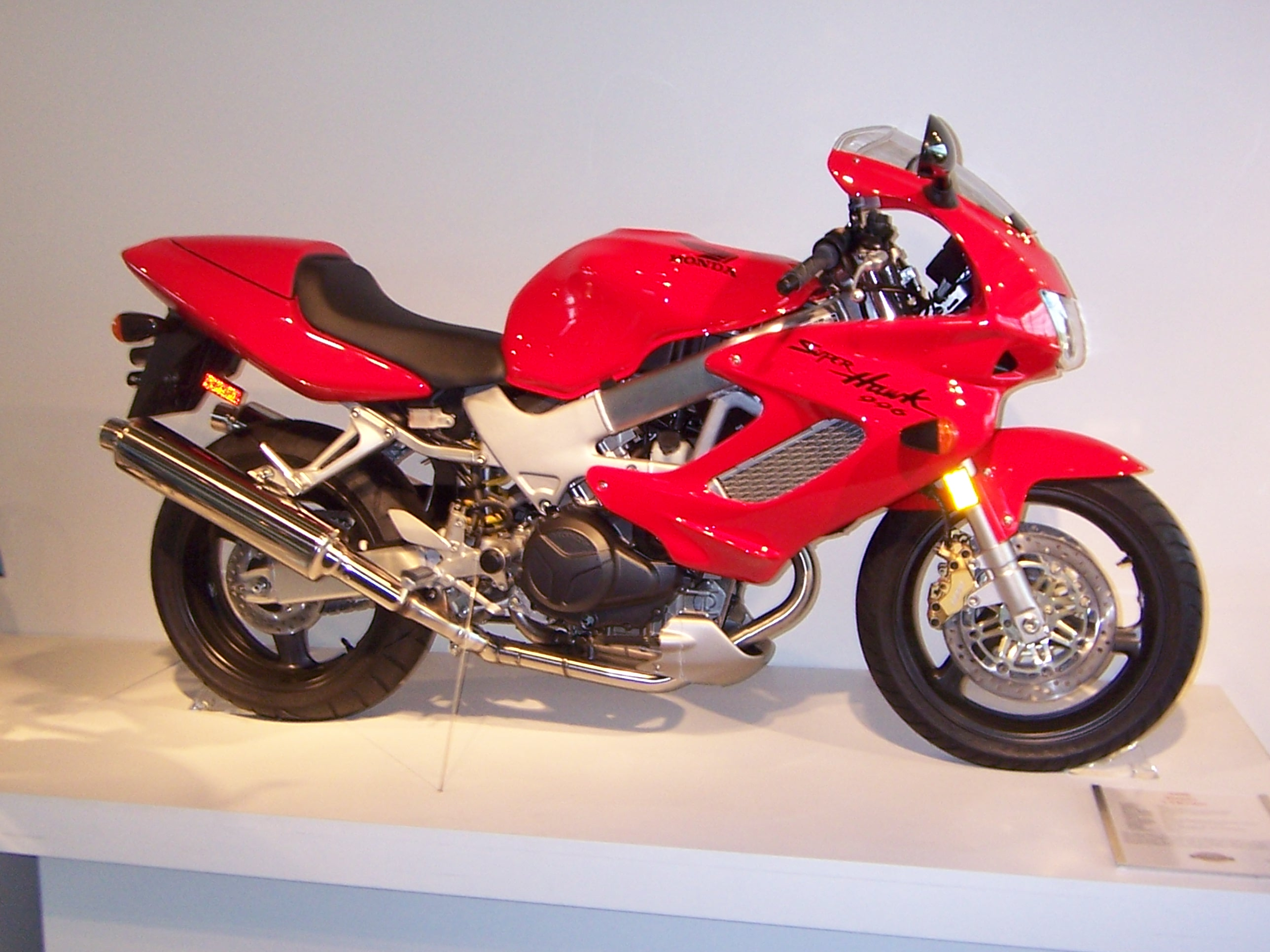
1998 VTR1000

The VTR1000F was introduced in 1997 using an all new 90-degree V-twin engine and a HMAS (Honda Multi-Action System) fork and shock. The bike also ushered in several new design concepts for Honda such as the semi-pivotless frame, where the engine is a stressed member with the swingarm bolted directly to it. Other innovations were side radiators, single-casting engine case, connecting rods with cap screws instead of nuts, and 38 mm intake valves, the largest Honda has ever used on a production motor at that time. It had the largest carburetors ever put on a production motorcycle (48 mm). In order to overcome response irregularities typical for larger V-twin engines, Honda specified different camshaft profiles and intake manifold dimensions for the two cylinders, and the power control of the engine was praised in motorbike surveys. Cycle World list a quarter-mile time and speed of 11.03-second/124.26-mph.

== Model history ==
In 1999, the VTR1000F featured new silver wheels.

From model year 2001, Honda introduced a number of upgrades. These included increasing the tank from 16 litres (4.23 US gallons) to 19 litres (5.02 US gallons), internal modifications to the front forks, black wheels, smaller indicators, and a less extreme riding position (thanks to mildly raked clip-on bars). A new LCD dash display comprised fuel level, engine temperature, dual trip mileometers, odometer and clock. A Honda Ignition Security System (HISS) immobiliser also became standard. The US model "Superhawk" never received the larger tank, instead retaining the original 16 litre (4.2 US gallons).

In 2005, the VTR1000F was discontinued.
