= Honda RC211V =

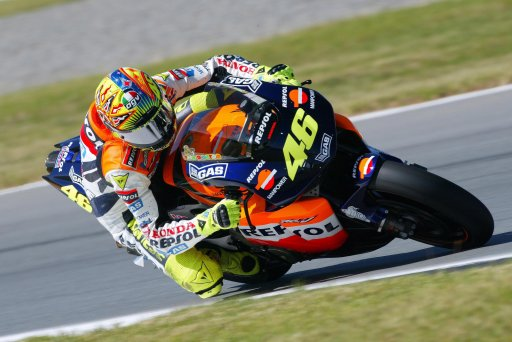
- Valentino Rossi riding Honda RC211V at the 2002 Czech Republic Grand Prix.
- Manufacturer: Honda Racing Corporation
- Production: 2002–2006
- Predecessor: Honda NSR500
- Successor: Honda RC212V
- Class: MotoGP
- Engine: 989 cc Water-cooled, 75.5° V-5, Four-stroke, DOHC, 20-valves, 4-valves per cylinder
- Wheelbase: 1,440 mm (57 in)
- Dimensions: L: 2,040 mm (80 in); W: 600 mm (24 in); H: 1,130 mm (44 in)
- Weight: 148 kg (326 lb) (dry)
- Fuel capacity: 24 L (5.3 imp gal; 6.3 US gal)

The Honda RC211V is a 990 cc (60 cu in) four-stroke race motorcycle from HRC (Honda Racing Corporation) developed in 2001 to replace the two-stroke Honda NSR500.

It was developed as a direct result of major changes to the regulations for the World Championship motorcycle road racing 500 cc (30.5 cu in) class for the 2002 season. The name of the class was modified to MotoGP, and while two-stroke engines remained limited to 500 cc (30.5 cu in), four cylinders, four-stroke engines were now allowed to be as large as 990 cc (60 cu in) and from three to six cylinders – which led many teams to switch to four-stroke designs.

The model name designates the following:

- RC = Honda's traditional racing prefix for 4-stroke bikes
- 211 = first works bike of the 21st century
- V = V engine

The RC211V was replaced in 2007 by the RC212V.

== 2002 ==
In 2002, the debut year of the RC211V, Honda and Valentino Rossi dominated by winning the constructors' championship by more than 100 points over their nearest rival. The bike underwent small modifications over the season, but it did not as yet have traction control so much as a handlebar-mounted power management system with three settings for different needs during a race.

Factory riders: Valentino Rossi, Tohru Ukawa
Satellite riders (in the latter part of the season): Alex Barros, Daijiro Kato

== 2003 ==
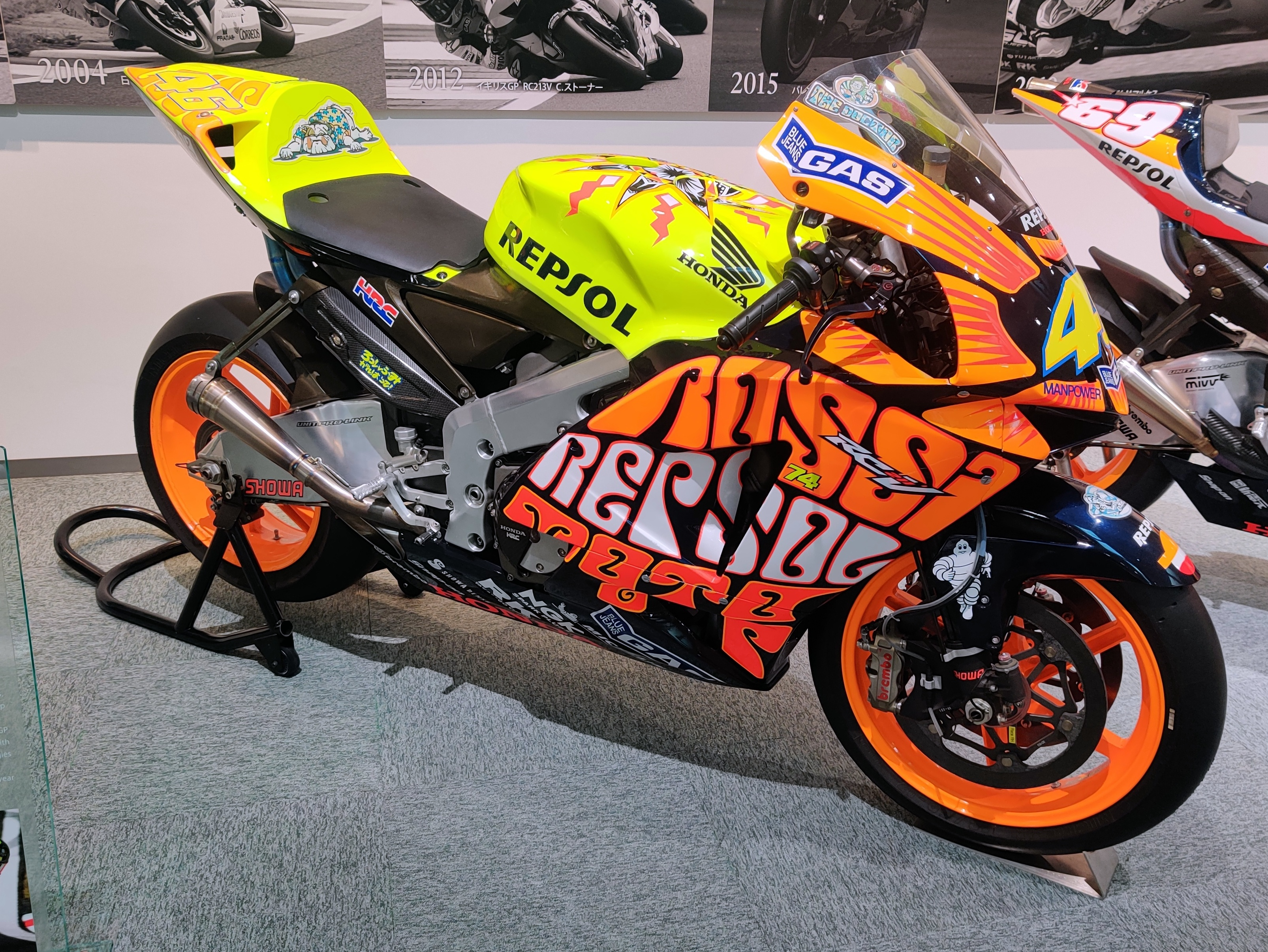
Honda RC211V with special livery used by Rossi during the 2003 GP of Valencia

Among other changes in 2003, power was increased from about 200 to 240 bhp. Traction control was also added.

Factory riders: Valentino Rossi, Nicky Hayden, Daijiro Kato, Sete Gibernau
Satellite riders: Max Biaggi, Tohru Ukawa, Makoto Tamada, Ryuichi Kiyonari

== 2004 ==
For 2004, a new, inverted rear suspension link was added, and a new exhaust was introduced at the Sachsenring round. The RC211V riders were unable to keep Rossi (now on a Yamaha YZR-M1) from winning his fourth premier-class championship, and no clear candidate appeared to take over Rossi's role of lead development rider for Honda.

Factory riders: Alex Barros, Nicky Hayden, Sete Gibernau
Satellite riders: Max Biaggi, Colin Edwards, Makoto Tamada

== 2005 ==
2005 would be the first time in four years Honda lost the constructors' championship in the premier class. The RC211V chassis underwent frequent revision and rewelding, with reversions to the 2003 design. After the race at Brno, Honda tested a new bike which both Hayden and Biaggi said was an improvement, and was thereafter known as the "Brno bike".

Factory riders: Max Biaggi, Nicky Hayden, Sete Gibernau
Satellite riders: Alex Barros, Makoto Tamada, Marco Melandri, Troy Bayliss

== 2006 ==
In 2006, the RC211V came in three flavors: the "Brno bike" to be ridden by Hayden, a 2006 bike with a special chassis for Pedrosa, and a 2006 bike to be ridden by Melandri, Elías, Stoner, and Tamada; Melandri and Stoner eventually got the special Pedrosa chassis. Hayden's RC211V was modified to put the crankshaft higher, the clutch and gearbox lower, and to lengthen the swing arm; the goal was to centralize mass and improve stability. After the Jerez round, Hayden was the fastest Honda rider in testing. At the British GP, HRC gave Hayden a new chassis, but Hayden complained that he didn't have enough time to test it. Hayden had started the year with the same clutch as Pedrosa, but four rounds later it was shelved in favor of a clutch Hayden had used in previous years; at the Brno round, he had a problem with the clutch that contributed to a 9th-place finish. Honda and Hayden had difficulty finding a clutch that would allow a good launch at the start but also work well throughout the race. Hayden eventually won the rider championship and Honda reclaimed the constructors' championship.

Factory riders: Nicky Hayden, Dani Pedrosa
Satellite riders: Makoto Tamada, Marco Melandri, Toni Elías, Casey Stoner

The RC211V was retired when rules dictated a switch to 800 cc (49 cu in) capacity; Honda's bike for 2007 was the RC212V.

== Successes ==
In five seasons of MotoGP racing the Honda RC211V won 48 races out of 82 (58.5%) contested. It also won three-rider world championships (Rossi 2002, 2003 and Hayden 2006) and four constructor titles (2002, 2003, 2004, 2006).

== Specifications ==
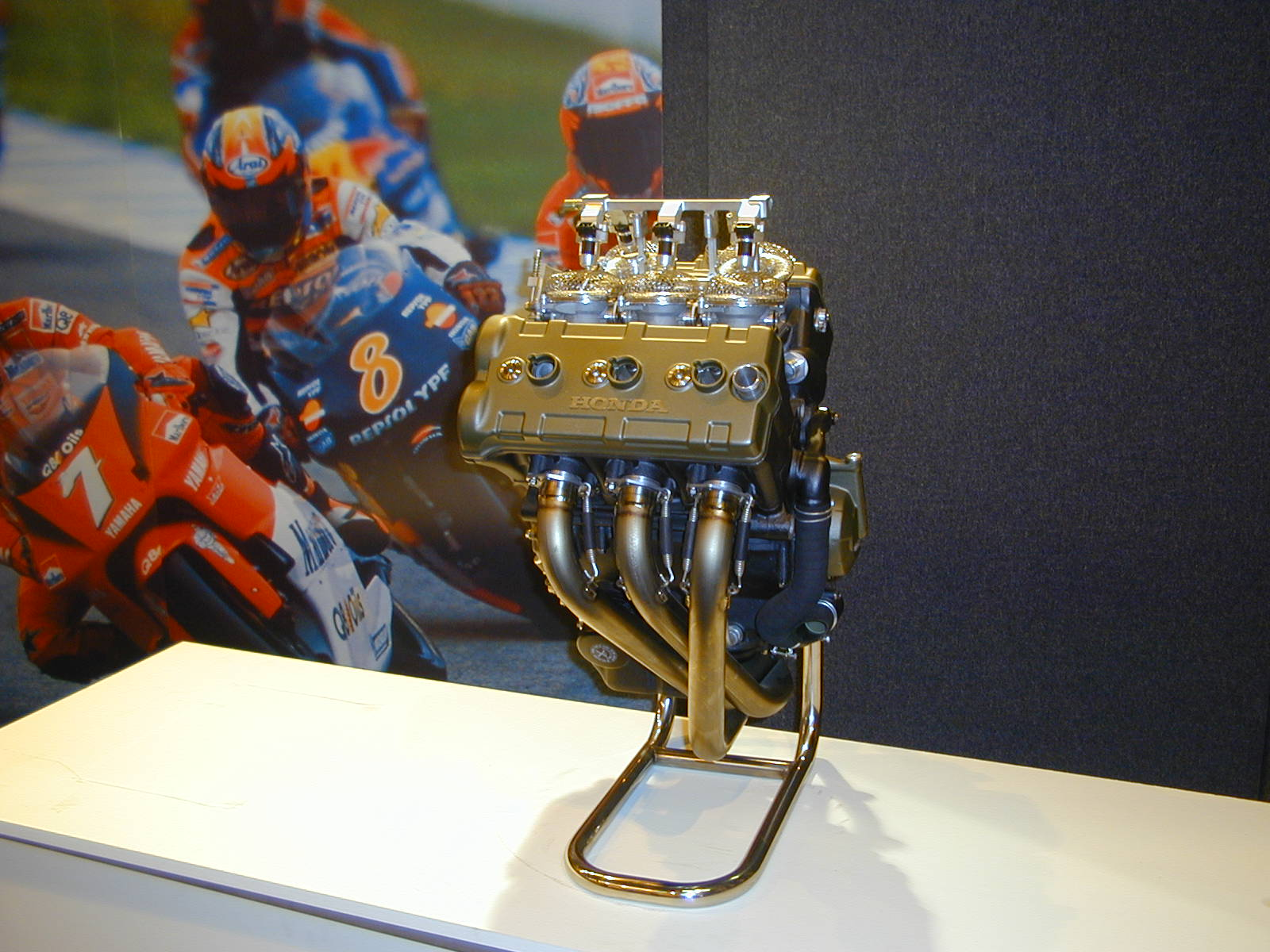
V-5 MotoGP engine

Specifications as per manufacturer:

| | 2002 | 2003 | 2004 | 2005 | 2006 | |
|---|---|---|---|---|---|---|
| Length | 2,050 mm (80.7 in) | | | | | |
| Width | 600 mm (23.6 in) | | 645 mm (25.4 in) | | | |
| Height | 1,130 mm (44.5 in) | | | | | |
| Wheelbase | 1,450 mm (57.1 in) | | | | | |
| Road clearance | 130 mm (5.1 in) | | | | | |
| Weight | around 145 kg (320 lb) | | | | | |
| Engine type | water-cooled, four-stroke, DOHC 4 Valve, V-5 75.5° | | | | | |
| Displacement | 990 cc (60 cu in) | | | | | |
| Bore x stroke | 73mm x 47.3mm | | 75mm x 44.8mm | | | |
| Compression | 13.5:1 | | 13.3:1 | | 13.2:1 | 13.9:1 |
| Model | NV5A | NV5B | NV5C | NV5D | NV5HD | NV5HG |
| Max power | 175.5 kW (235.3 hp) @ 15,000 rpm | 183 kW (245 hp) @ 15,500 rpm | 188.1 kW (252.2 hp) @ 16,500 rpm | 184 kW (247 hp) @ 16,500 rpm | 183.5 kW (246.1 hp) @ 16,500 rpm | 190.2 kW (255.1 hp) @ 17,000 rpm |
| Torque | 117.4Nm @ 11,500 rpm | 117.1Nm @ 11,500 rpm | 115.5Nm @ 13,500 rpm | 113.2Nm @ 13,500 rpm | 114Nm @ 13,000 rpm | 116Nm @ 14,000 rpm |
| Frame type | Twin-spar | | | | | |
| Front wheel | 17 in (43 cm) | | 16.5 in (42 cm) | | | |
| Rear wheel | 16.5 in (42 cm) | | | | | |
| Front suspension | Telescopic | | | | | |
| Rear suspension | Unit Pro-Link | | | | | New Unit Pro-Link |
| Fuel capacity | 24 L (5.3 imp gal; 6.3 US gal) | | | 22 L (4.8 imp gal; 5.8 US gal) | | |

== Complete MotoGP results ==
=== Motorcycle summary ===
Title won
Rider: (Valentino Rossi 2002, 2003)
(Nicky Hayden 2006)
Constructors: (2002, 2003 2006)
Race Won: 48
2002: Rossi 11, Barros 2, Ukawa 1 (14 in total)
2003: Rossi 9, Gibernau 4, Biaggi 2 (15 in total)
2004: Gibernau 4, Tamada 2, Biaggi 1 (7 in total)
2005: Melandri 2, Hayden 1, Barros 1 (4 in total)
2006: Melandri 3, Pedrosa 2, Hayden 2, Elias 1 (8 in total)

Poles: 46
2002: Rossi 7, Barros 1, Kato 1 (9 in total)
2003: Rossi 9, Biaggi 3, Sete Gibernau 1 (13 in total)
2004: Gibernau 5, Tamada 2, Biaggi 1 (8 in total)
2005: Gibernau 5, Hayden 4, Barros 1 (10 in total)
2006: Pedrosa 4, Hayden 1, Stoner 1 (6 in total)

=== RC211V results ===
(key) (results in bold indicate pole position; results in italics indicate fastest lap) (the teams are bold indicate factory teams; the riders are bold indicate the rider rode a factory bikes in the satellite teams)

| Year | Tyres | Team | No. | Rider | 1 | 2 | 3 | 4 | 5 | 6 | 7 | 8 | 9 | 10 | 11 | 12 | 13 | 14 | 15 | 16 | 17 | Points | RC |
|---|---|---|---|---|---|---|---|---|---|---|---|---|---|---|---|---|---|---|---|---|---|---|---|
| 2002 | **MI** | | | | JPN | RSA | ESP | FRA | ITA | CAT | NED | GBR | GER | CZE | POR | BRA | PAC | MAL | AUS | VAL | | | |
| 2002 | **MI** | (Japan) **Repsol Honda Team** | 11 | (Japan) Tohru Ukawa | Ret | 1 | 3 | 2 | 3 | 2 | 5 | WD | 3 | 3 | 3 | Ret | 4 | 4 | 3 | 5 | | **209** | **3rd** |
| 2002 | **MI** | (Japan) **Repsol Honda Team** | 46 | (Italy) Valentino Rossi | **1** | **2** | **1** | **1** | **1** | 1 | **1** | **1** | 1 | Ret | 1 | 1 | 2 | 2 | 1 | 2 | | **355** | **1st** |
| 2002 | **MI** | (Japan) **Team HRC** | 72 | (Japan) Shinichi Ito | 4 | | | | | | | | | | | | | | | | | 13 | 21st |
| 2002 | **MI** | (Spain) West Honda Pons | 4 | (Brazil) Alex Barros | | | | | | | | | | | | | 1 | **3** | 2 | 1 | | 86 (204) | 4th |
| 2002 | **MI** | (Italy) Fortuna Honda Gresini | 74 | (Japan) Daijiro Kato | | | | | | | | | | 2 | Ret | Ret | **Ret** | 5 | 4 | 4 | | 55 (117) | 7th |
| 2003 | **MI** | | | | JPN | RSA | ESP | FRA | ITA | CAT | NED | GBR | GER | CZE | POR | BRA | PAC | MAL | AUS | VAL | | | |
| 2003 | **MI** | (Japan) **Repsol Honda** | 46 | (Italy) Valentino Rossi | **1** | 2 | 1 | **2** | **1** | **2** | 3 | 3 | 2 | **1** | 1 | **1** | 2 | **1** | **1** | **1** | | **357** | **1st** |
| 2003 | **MI** | (Japan) **Repsol Honda** | 69 | (United States) Nicky Hayden | 7 | 7 | Ret | 12 | 12 | 9 | 11 | 8 | 5 | 6 | 9 | 5 | 3 | 4 | 3 | 16 | | 130 | 5th |
| 2003 | **MI** | (Italy) Telefónica Movistar Honda | 15 | (Spain) **Sete Gibernau** | 4 | **1** | Ret | 1 | 7 | 3 | 1 | 2 | 1 | 2 | 4 | 2 | 4 | 2 | 4 | 2 | | **277** | **2nd** |
| 2003 | **MI** | (Italy) Telefónica Movistar Honda | 74 | (Japan) **Daijiro Kato** | Ret | | | | | | | | | | | | | | | | | 0 | NC |
| 2003 | **MI** | (Italy) Telefónica Movistar Honda | 23 | (Japan) Ryuichi Kiyonari | | | | 13 | 13 | 11 | 17 | 14 | 18 | 15 | 16 | 15 | 11 | 21 | 19 | 14 | | 22 | 20th |
| 2003 | **MI** | (Spain) Camel Pramac Pons | 3 | (Italy) Max Biaggi | 2 | 3 | 2 | 5 | 3 | 14 | 2 | **1** | **Ret** | 5 | 2 | 4 | **1** | 3 | 17 | 4 | | **228** | **3rd** |
| 2003 | **MI** | (Spain) Camel Pramac Pons | 11 | (Japan) Tohru Ukawa | 20 | 6 | 4 | 7 | 6 | 6 | 12 | Ret | 6 | 8 | 5 | 7 | 7 | 7 | 5 | Ret | | 123 | 8th |
| 2003 | B | (Italy) Pramac Honda | 6 | (Japan) Makoto Tamada | Ret | 14 | 6 | Ret | 4 | 7 | 16 | 13 | 13 | 9 | 10 | 3 | DSQ | 10 | 10 | 10 | | 87 | 11th |
| 2004 | **MI** | | | | RSA | ESP | FRA | ITA | CAT | NED | BRA | GER | GBR | CZE | POR | JPN | QAT | MAL | AUS | VAL | | | |
| 2004 | **MI** | (Japan) **Repsol Honda** | 4 | (Brazil) Alex Barros | 4 | 3 | 7 | 6 | Ret | Ret | 5 | 2 | 9 | Ret | 3 | 4 | 4 | 3 | 5 | 6 | | 165 | 4th |
| 2004 | **MI** | (Japan) **Repsol Honda** | 69 | (United States) Nicky Hayden | 5 | 5 | 11 | Ret | Ret | 5 | 3 | 3 | 4 | Ret | | Ret | 5 | 4 | 6 | Ret | | 117 | 8th |
| 2004 | **MI** | (Japan) **HRC** | 72 | (Japan) Tohru Ukawa | | | | | | | | | | | | Ret | | | | | | 0 | NC |
| 2004 | **MI** | (Italy) Telefónica Movistar Honda MotoGP | 15 | (Spain) **Sete Gibernau** | 3 | 1 | **1** | **2** | **2** | 2 | Ret | Ret | 3 | **1** | 4 | 6 | 1 | 7 | **2** | 4 | | **257** | **2nd** |
| 2004 | **MI** | (Italy) Telefónica Movistar Honda MotoGP | 45 | (United States) Colin Edwards | 7 | 7 | 5 | 12 | 5 | 6 | 6 | 5 | 2 | 7 | 9 | Ret | 2 | 11 | 4 | 8 | | 157 | 5th |
| 2004 | **MI** | (Spain) Camel Honda | 3 | (Italy) Max Biaggi | 2 | 2 | 3 | 3 | 8 | 4 | 2 | **1** | 12 | 3 | Ret | Ret | 6 | 2 | 7 | 2 | | **217** | **3rd** |
| 2004 | B | (Spain) Camel Honda | 6 | (Japan) Makoto Tamada | 8 | Ret | 9 | Ret | Ret | 12 | 1 | 6 | 14 | 4 | **2** | **1** | 10 | 5 | 8 | **5** | | 150 | 6th |
| 2005 | **MI** | | | | ESP | POR | CHN | FRA | ITA | CAT | NED | USA | GBR | GER | CZE | JPN | MAL | QAT | AUS | TUR | VAL | | |
| 2005 | **MI** | (Japan) **Repsol Honda Team** | 3 | (Italy) Max Biaggi | 7 | 3 | 5 | 5 | 2 | 6 | 6 | 4 | Ret | 4 | 3 | 2 | 6 | Ret | Ret | 12 | 6 | 173 | 5th |
| 2005 | **MI** | (Japan) **Repsol Honda Team** | 69 | (United States) Nicky Hayden | Ret | 7 | 9 | 6 | 6 | 5 | 4 | **1** | Ret | **3** | 5 | 7 | 4 | 3 | **2** | 3 | 2 | **206** | **3rd** |
| 2005 | **MI** | (Italy) Movistar Honda MotoGP | 15 | (Spain) **Sete Gibernau** | 2 | Ret | 4 | 2 | Ret | **2** | 5 | 5 | Ret | 2 | **Ret** | Ret | Ret | 5 | 5 | 4 | **Ret** | 150 | 7th |
| 2005 | **MI** | (Italy) Movistar Honda MotoGP | 33 | (Italy) Marco Melandri | 3 | 4 | 3 | 4 | 4 | 3 | 2 | Ret | Ret | 7 | 6 | Ret | 5 | 2 | 4 | 1 | 1 | **220** | **2nd** |
| 2005 | **MI** | (Spain) Camel Honda (Note: Due to tobacco advertising, the team was known as Honda Pons at the Red Bull U.S. Grand Prix.) | 4 | (Brazil) Alex Barros | 4 | **1** | 11 | Ret | 7 | 4 | 7 | Ret | 3 | 5 | 4 | Ret | 8 | 9 | Ret | 9 | 5 | 147 | 8th |
| 2005 | **MI** | (Spain) Camel Honda | 12 | (Australia) Troy Bayliss | 6 | 11 | Ret | 10 | 13 | 8 | 11 | 6 | Ret | Ret | 9 | | | | | | | 54 | 15th |
| 2005 | **MI** | (Spain) Camel Honda | 17 | (Australia) Chris Vermeulen | | | | | | | | | | | | | | | 11 | 11 | | 10 | 21st |
| 2005 | **MI** | (Spain) Camel Honda | 54 | (Japan) Ryuichi Kiyonari | | | | | | | | | | | | | | | | | 12 | 4 | 25th |
| 2005 | **MI** | (Spain) Camel Honda | 67 | (United Kingdom) Shane Byrne | | | | | | | | | | | | | 14 | 13 | | | | 5 (6) | 24th |
| 2005 | **MI** | (Spain) Camel Honda | 72 | (Japan) Tohru Ukawa | | | | | | | | | | | | Ret | | | | | | 0 (1) | 27th |
| 2005 | **MI** | (Monaco) Konica Minolta Honda | 6 | (Japan) Makoto Tamada | 8 | DNS | | | 8 | Ret | 14 | 7 | 7 | 10 | 10 | 3 | 12 | Ret | 8 | 8 | 9 | 91 | 11th |
| 2005 | **MI** | (Monaco) Konica Minolta Honda | 16 | (Netherlands) Jurgen van den Goorbergh | | | 6 | 14 | | | | | | | | | | | | | | 12 | 20th |
| 2006 | **MI** | | | | ESP | QAT | TUR | CHN | FRA | ITA | CAT | NED | GBR | GER | USA | CZE | MAL | AUS | JPN | POR | VAL | | |
| 2006 | **MI** | (Japan) **Repsol Honda Team** | 26 | (Spain) Dani Pedrosa | 2 | 6 | 14 | **1** | **3** | 4 | Ret | 3 | **1** | **4** | 2 | 3 | 3 | 15 | 7 | Ret | 4 | 215 | 5th |
| 2006 | **MI** | (Japan) **Repsol Honda Team** | 69 | (United States) Nicky Hayden | 3 | 2 | 3 | 2 | 5 | 3 | 2 | 1 | 7 | 3 | 1 | 9 | 4 | **5** | 5 | Ret | 3 | **254** | **1st** |
| 2006 | **MI** | (Monaco) Konica Minolta Honda | 6 | (Japan) Makoto Tamada | 10 | 14 | 10 | 6 | 7 | 9 | 7 | 11 | 11 | Ret | 11 | 13 | 14 | 10 | 10 | 5 | 12 | 96 | 12th |
| 2006 | **MI** | (Italy) Fortuna Honda | 24 | (Spain) Toni Elías | 4 | 8 | 5 | 11 | 9 | 7 | Ret | DNS | | 11 | 15 | 11 | Ret | 9 | 6 | 1 | 6 | 116 | 9th |
| 2006 | **MI** | (Italy) Fortuna Honda | 33 | (Italy) Marco Melandri | 5 | 7 | 1 | 7 | 1 | 6 | Ret | 7 | 3 | 2 | 3 | 5 | 9 | 1 | 3 | 8 | 5 | 228 | 4th |
| 2006 | **MI** | (Italy) Fortuna Honda | 84 | (Italy) Michel Fabrizio | | | | | | | | | DNS | | | | | | | | | 0 | NC |
| 2006 | **MI** | (Monaco) Honda LCR | 27 | (Australia) Casey Stoner | 6 | **5** | 2 | 5 | 4 | Ret | Ret | 4 | 4 | DNS | Ret | 6 | 8 | 6 | Ret | Ret | Ret | 119 | 8th |

== See also ==
- List of motorcycles by type of engine
