= Honda RC212V =

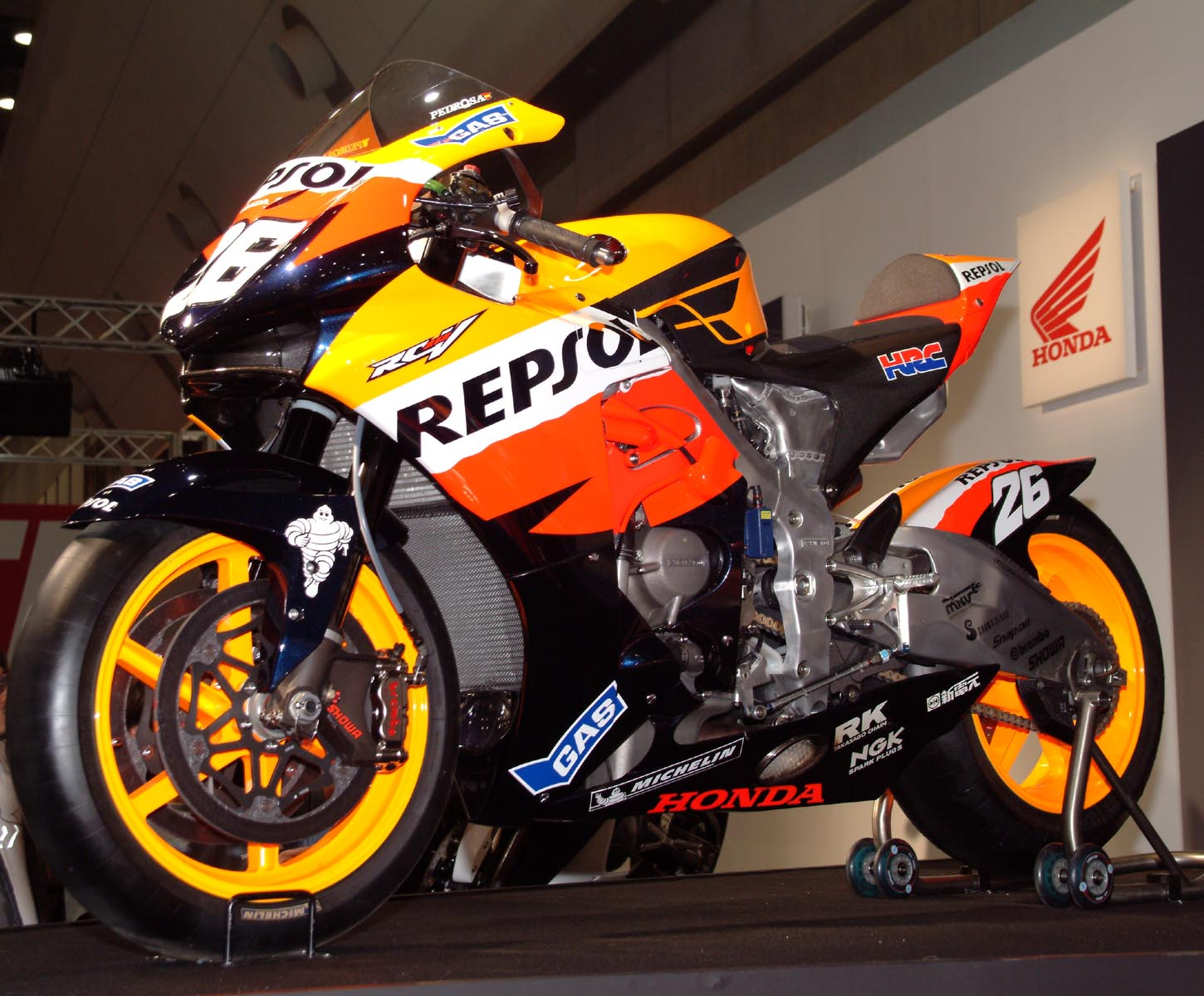
- Dani Pedrosa's 2007 Honda RC212V
- Manufacturer: Honda Racing Corporation
- Production: 2006–2011
- Predecessor: Honda RC211V
- Successor: Honda RC213V
- Class: MotoGP prototype
- Engine: 800 cc (49 cu in) four-stroke V4 78°
- Wheelbase: 1,440 mm
- Dimensions: L: 2,050 mm W: 645 mm
- Weight: 148 kg (dry)
- Fuel capacity: 21L

The Honda RC212V is a Japanese motorcycle created for road racing in the 800 cc (49 cu in) MotoGP series. Officially introduced on 30 October 2006 as the RC211V replacement in the MotoGP series, it was developed by Honda Racing Corporation (HRC) throughout 2006 and began officially racing in the 2007 season.

The model name designates the following:

- RC= Honda's traditional racing prefix for 4-stroke bikes
- 212= second works bike of the 21st century
- V= V engine

The RC212V features an 800 cc (49 cu in), liquid-cooled, four-stroke, DOHC 4-valve V4 to power an all-new chassis built with mass centralization and handling as top priority.

== 2007 ==
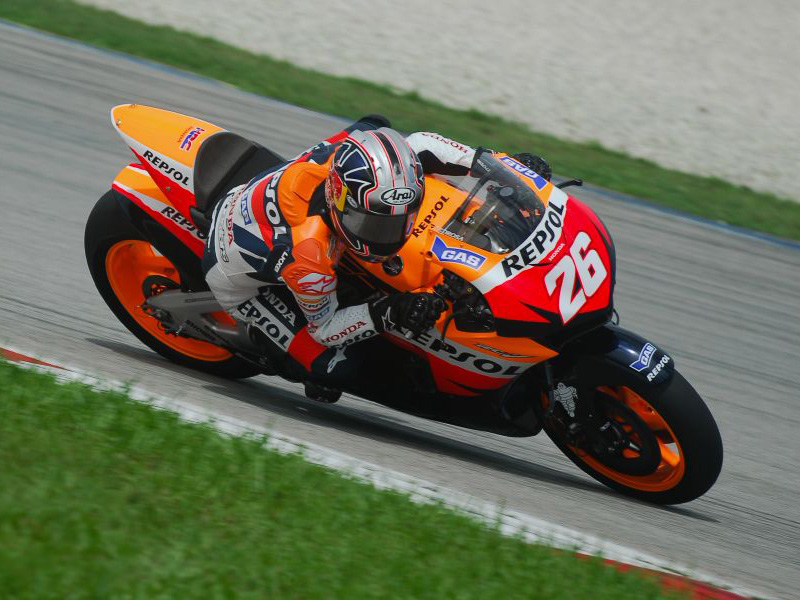
Dani Pedrosa testing the RC212V

Dani Pedrosa and Nicky Hayden rode the factory-backed versions, while the customer machines were ridden by Marco Melandri, Toni Elías, Carlos Checa, and Shinya Nakano. A perennial issue with Honda's GP motorcycle is which team and rider receives the best parts and whether performance differences are due to the rider not the machine. Before the racing season started in 2007, Melandri was quoted as saying, "In the past few tests I've seen a big progression with Pedrosa's bike, but we're still waiting for new parts from Honda."

After a few rounds, Honda riders did not achieve the results expected, leading HRC chief Satoru Horiike to admit that they made a mistake in the motorcycle's development. Melandri decided to ride with the Ducati team in 2008 and Pedrosa's dissatisfaction led to rumors that he was leaving Honda. Towards the end of 2007, however, there were signs of improvement, with the Repsol Honda team taking the last five pole positions of the season and Pedrosa winning the last round at Valencia.

== 2008 ==
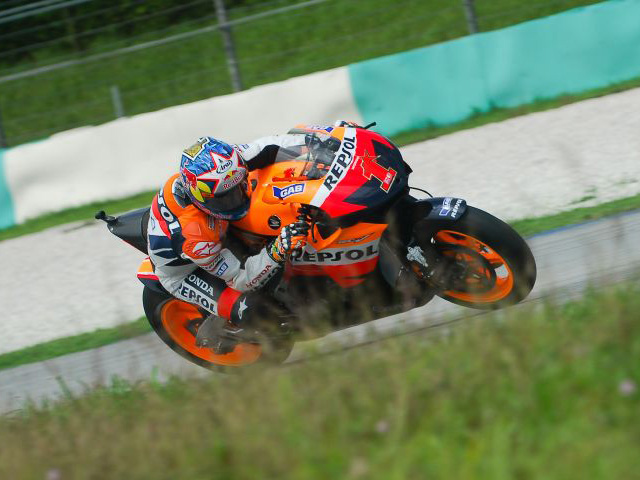
Nicky Hayden testing the RC212V

For 2008, HRC planned to use pneumatic valve springs and an all-new chassis. The mass centralization of the 2007 model was thought to have gone too far, and instead the 2008 model is more open, reducing heat and improving balance. The factory team riders are Pedrosa (through 2009) and Hayden (through 2008). Satellite team riders are Nakano, Andrea Dovizioso, Randy de Puniet and Alex de Angelis.

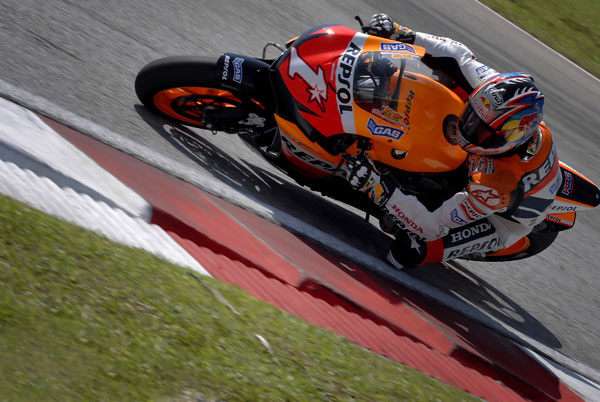
Nicky Hayden testing the RC212V

The 2008 pneumatic valve version has only been available to the Repsol Honda team, and in pre-season testing it has been highly problematic. The original intent of running an all-new engine and chassis was shelved when the engine did not perform to expectations. Pedrosa and Hayden then tested a 2007 engine in a 2008 chassis, and after still being near the bottom of testing timesheets, the Repsol Honda team used the 2007 version in the first round's practice for comparison purposes. For the race, Pedrosa chose a revised 2008 chassis while Hayden chose the 2007. The pneumatic engine was race-debuted by Hayden at the Donington round, and he was charged with developing the new engine for the rest of the season (Pedrosa deciding to continue using the conventional valve engine). An electronic problem at the subsequent Assen round caused Hayden to run out of fuel just before the line, allowing Colin Edwards to come around him and take the remaining podium position.

At the 13th round it was announced that Pedrosa would switch to Bridgestone tires for the remainder of the season, and he also planned to start racing the pneumatic valved engine in the 14th round at Indianapolis.

Unlike the other Honda teams, de Puniet's LCR Team used Öhlins suspension instead of Showa.

== 2009 ==
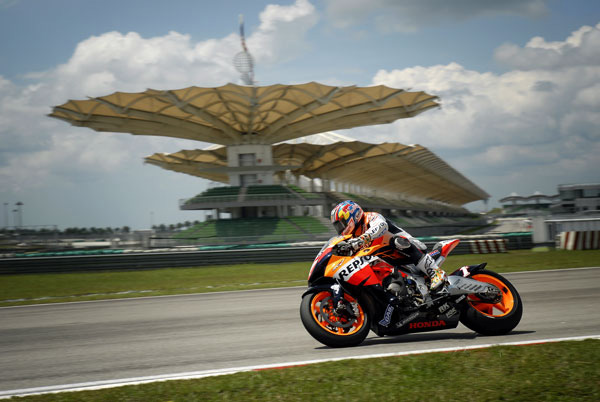
Nicky Hayden testing the RC212V

For 2009, the factory team riders were Pedrosa and Dovizioso, and the satellite team riders were Elías, De Angelis, de Puniet and Yuki Takahashi; Elías was given a factory spec machine. The 2009 model was largely the same as the 2008. All 6 of the RC212Vs used pneumatic valve engines.

After two rounds the Repsol Honda riders had only achieved a single podium. Vice president of HRC, Shuhei Nakamoto, said "If Dani does not win the world championship it is Honda's responsibility, not Dani's," while Pedrosa said "I've spoken to (Nakamoto) but I've spoken to many people like him, but it seems like it's three years of the same story. What I really need is to see is some things coming, not always just hearing, talking, or a meeting. I'd like to have something where I can say okay, thank you, this is good."

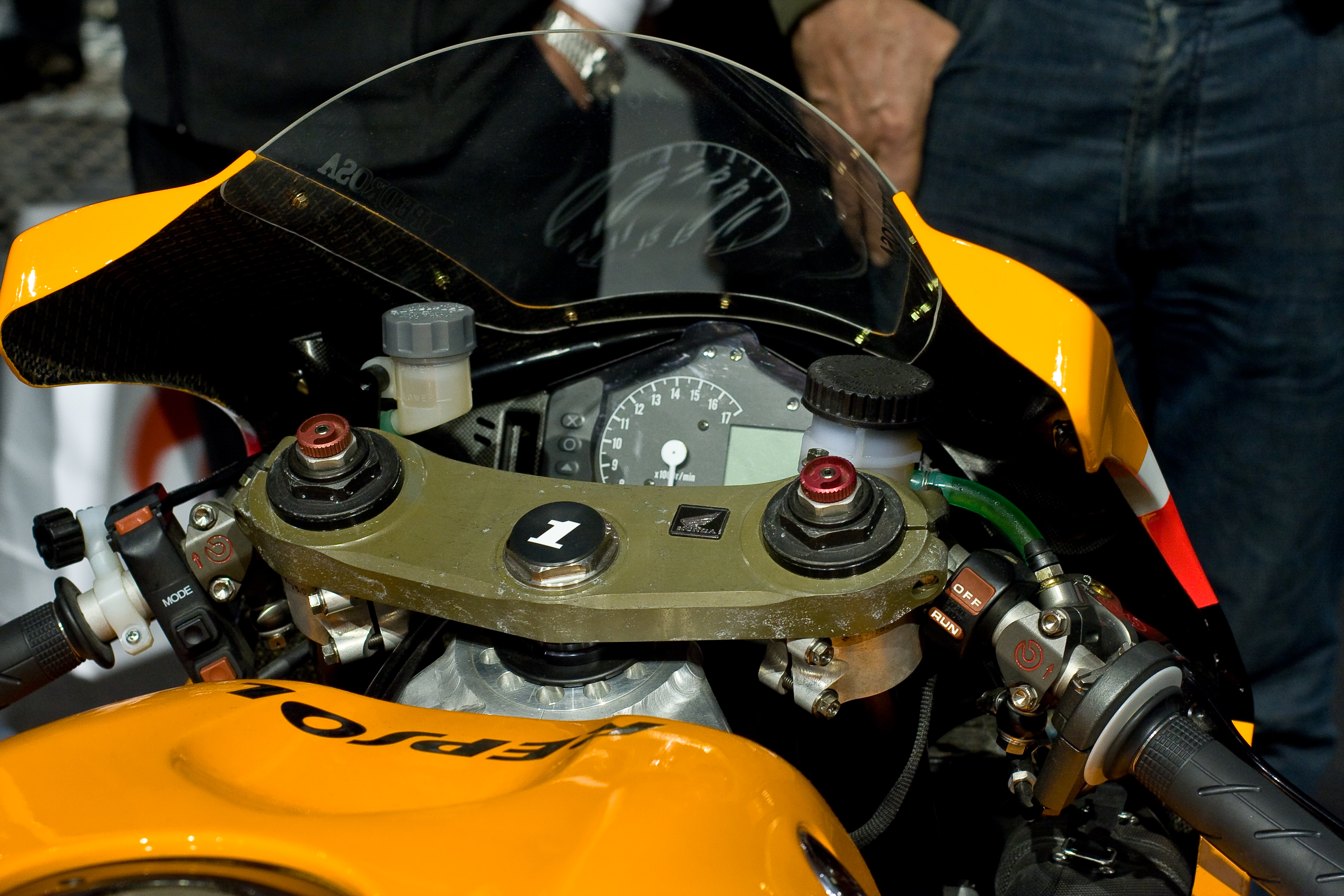
Cockpit of the RC212V

Before Round 6 at Catalunya, Dovizioso expressed frustration that Pedrosa would be given priority in the post-race test, feeling that the Spaniard's poor physical condition would not lead to a productive evaluation. In the race, Dovizioso finished in 4th place and Pedrosa in 6th, and Pedrosa announced he would skip the test to rest. Using the new chassis, Dovizioso was top rider of the test.

In practice at Round 7 at Assen Pedrosa remarked that the new chassis was an improvement in braking and stability, but both Pedrosa and Dovizioso crashed in the race at the same turn. At the following round at Laguna Seca, Pedrosa won the race, while Dovizioso crashed out.

In post-race testing at Brno, the Repsol team tested Öhlins suspension components, which until then had been using Showa. For the San Marino round, Dovizioso will use Öhlins and Pedrosa will use Showa suspension.

The 2009 season ended with three wins for the Repsol Honda team—two for Pedrosa and one for Dovizioso—and a 2nd place in the constructor championship for Honda. At post-race testing at Valencia, Pedrosa tested Öhlins suspension exclusively, and the factory team tried a new chassis and swingarm. Pedrosa and Dovizioso had the 3rd and 6th fastest times over the three-day test.

== 2010 ==
For 2010, the factory team riders are Pedrosa and Dovizioso, and the satellite team riders are Hiroshi Aoyama, de Puniet, Melandri and Marco Simoncelli. All riders are using Öhlins suspension components this year. The electronic systems were given an update, and the bike is shorter with a higher center of gravity. Also, Honda hired Andre Zugna and Cristian Battaglia, formerly Yamaha race engineers, and Carlo Luzzi, formerly Jorge Lorenzo’s telemetry technician at Yamaha.

According to one analysis of pre-season tests at Sepang and Qatar, Dovizioso's average placing in the tests was third, while Pedrosa's was ninth. Pedrosa complained of problems with the suspension and chassis, and at the first race of the season in Qatar, Dovizioso finished third, while Pedrosa finished in seventh place. Pedrosa experienced speed wobbles down the front straight, and Honda determined that they had committed a mistake in the design of the chassis, and that by trying to make the bike easier to ride, they made it too flexible.

By the following round at Jerez, Pedrosa had a new chassis and finished the race in second place and Dovizioso finished in sixth; in the test after the race, Pedrosa finished fastest and Dovizioso fifth, using a new swingarm that Pedrosa used in the race, and also a new chassis. Pedrosa later said and Honda confirmed that a fuel sensor problem slowed down the RC212V in the final laps and may have cost him the victory at Jerez.

At the third round at Le Mans, Dovizioso finished the race in third and Pedrosa in fifth, the latter getting passed in the last lap by Dovizioso and Hayden and later reporting problems with the rear brake. Melandri had switched back to Showa suspension and finished in sixth place. At the fourth round at Mugello, Pedrosa won the race, Dovizioso finished third and Melandri finished fifth. Pedrosa used a 2009 model rear shock. During first practice at the 14th round at Motegi, the throttle cable stuck and caused Pedrosa to crash and break his collarbone, causing him to miss the race and putting him out of contention for the championship. At the 16th round in Australia, Dovizioso's steering damper had a problem, forcing him to retire from the race. The season ended with Honda placing second in the MotoGP constructor championship with 342 points, 62 points behind first-place Yamaha and 56 points ahead of third-place Ducati.

== 2011 ==
For 2011 the factory supported riders were Andrea Dovizioso, Dani Pedrosa, Casey Stoner, and Marco Simoncelli while the satellite supported riders were Hiroshi Aoyama and Toni Elías. Honda riders dominated pre-season testing. Frame geometry and rigidity are the same as the previous year, making the 2011 bike an evolution of the 2010 version. One of the improvements to the 2011 machine is a "seamless transmission". Stoner and Dovizioso chose to use the 2011 chassis, while Pedrosa decided to stay with the more flexible 2010 version.

After the third round at Estoril, Dovizioso began to use a new clutch designed to reduce hopping under braking.

Honda won the manufacturer's championship with 13 wins between Stoner's ten and Pedrosa's three, and never finished lower than second in race results. The factory RC212V was retired at the end of the season to make way for the 2012 RC213V, though leased models will still be raced by satellite teams.

== Specifications ==
		2007	2008	2009	2010	2011
Overall length		2,050 mm (80.7 in)	2,060 mm (81.1 in)		2,052 mm (80.8 in)	
Overall width		645 mm (25.4 in)				
Overall height		1,125 mm (44.3 in)			1,110 mm (43.7 in)	
Wheelbase		1,440 mm (56.7 in)	1,450 mm (57.1 in)		1,435 mm (56.5 in)	
Road Clearance		125 mm (4.9 in)			115 mm (4.5 in)	
Weight		over 148 kg (326 lb)			over 150 kg (331 lb)	
Engine Type		Liquid-cooled, Four-stroke, DOHC 4 Valve, V-4 78°				
Displacement		799.6 cc (49 cu in)				
Bore x stroke		75mm x 45.25mm	80mm x 39.77mm			
Max Power		158 kW (212 hp) @ 17,000 rpm	171 kW (229 hp) @ 18,000 rpm		169 kW (227 hp) @ 18,000 rpm	174 kW (233 hp) @ 18,500 rpm
Frame Type		Aluminum Twin-tube				
Tire Size
Tire Size	Front	16 in (41 cm)		16.5 in (42 cm)		
Tire Size	Tires	Michelin	Michelin, Bridgestone	Bridgestone		
Tire Size	Rear	16.5 in (42 cm)				
Suspension
Suspension	Front	Telescopic fork				
Suspension	Suspension		Showa SPL	Showa SPL, Öhlins	Öhlins	
Suspension	Rear	New Unit Pro-link	Pro-link			
Fuel Capacity		21 L (4.6 imp gal; 5.5 US gal)				

== Summary MotoGP results ==
Titles Won
Riders: 2011 (Casey Stoner)
Constructors: 2011

Races won: 24
2011: Stoner 10, Pedrosa 3 (13 in total)
2010: Pedrosa 4 (4 in total)
2009: Pedrosa 2, Dovizioso 1 (3 in total)
2008: Pedrosa 2 (2 in total)
2007: Pedrosa 2 (2 in total)

Poles: 30
2011: Stoner 12, Pedrosa 3 (15 in total)
2010: Pedrosa 4, Dovizioso 1 (5 in total)
2009: Pedrosa 2 (2 in total)
2008: Pedrosa 2 (2 in total)
2007: Pedrosa 5, Hayden 1 (6 in total)

== Complete MotoGP results ==
(key) (results in bold indicate pole position; results in italics indicate fastest lap) (the teams are bold indicate factory teams; the riders are bold indicate the rider rode a factory bikes in the satellite teams)

Year	Tyres	Team	No.	Rider	1	2	3	4	5	6	7	8	9	10	11	12	13	14	15	16	17	18	Points	RC
2007					QAT	ESP	TUR	CHN	FRA	ITA	CAT	GBR	NED	GER	USA	CZE	RSM	POR	JPN	AUS	MAL	VAL		
2007	**MI**	(Japan) **Repsol Honda Team**	1	(United States) Nicky Hayden	8	7	7	12	Ret	10	11	17	3	3	Ret	3	13	**4**	9	Ret	9	8	127	8th
2007	**MI**	(Japan) **Repsol Honda Team**	26	(Spain) Dani Pedrosa	3	**2**	Ret	4	4	2	3	8	4	1	5	4	Ret	2	**Ret**	4	**3**	**1**	**242**	**2nd**
2007	**MI**	(Monaco) Honda LCR	7	(Spain) Carlos Checa	Ret	6	12	10	Ret	Ret	17	Ret	11	14	14	10	6	7	18	11	14	12	65	14th
2007	**B**	(Italy) Honda Gresini	17	(Canada) Miguel Duhamel											Ret								0	NC
2007	**B**	(Italy) Honda Gresini	24	(Spain) Toni Elías	14	4	2	Ret	Ret	6	Ret	12				11	7	8	3	15	6	10	104	12th
2007	**B**	(Italy) Honda Gresini	33	(Italy) Marco Melandri	5	8	5	5	2	9	9	10	10	6	3	WD	4	5	5	10	2	4	187	5th
2007	**B**	(Italy) Honda Gresini	84	(Italy) Michel Fabrizio										10									6	21st
2007	**MI**	(Monaco) Konica Minolta Honda	56	(Japan) Shinya Nakano	10	10	13	Ret	Ret	13	15	14	12	Ret	12	14	10	11	16	13	16	14	47	17th
2008					QAT	ESP	POR	CHN	FRA	ITA	CAT	GBR	NED	GER	USA	CZE	RSM	IND	JPN	AUS	MAL	VAL		
2008	**MI** **B** (Note: After completed at Misano, Dani Pedrosa switched to Bridgestone tyres for the rest of the season.)	(Japan) **Repsol Honda Team**	2	(Spain) Dani Pedrosa	3	1	2	2	4	3	1	3	2	Ret		15	4	8	3	Ret	**2**	2	**249**	**3rd**
2008	**MI**	(Japan) **Repsol Honda Team**	8	(Japan) Tadayuki Okada						14													2	21st
2008	**MI**	(Japan) **Repsol Honda Team**	69	(United States) Nicky Hayden	10	4	Ret	6	8	13	8	7	4	13	5		DNS	2	5	3	4	5	155	6th
2008	**MI**	(San Marino) JiR Team Scot MotoGP	4	(Italy) Andrea Dovizioso	4	8	Ret	11	6	8	4	5	5	5	4	9	8	5	9	7	3	4	174	5th
2008	**MI**	(Monaco) LCR Honda MotoGP	14	(France) Randy de Puniet	9	Ret	15	13	9	Ret	Ret	12	Ret	8	6	16	Ret	13	12	9	10	15	61	15th
2008	**B**	(Italy) San Carlo Honda Gresini	15	(San Marino) Alex de Angelis	Ret	14	11	16	12	4	Ret	15	Ret	4	13	8	Ret	10	17	Ret	14	10	63	14th
2008	**B**	(Italy) San Carlo Honda Gresini	56	(Japan) Shinya Nakano	13	9	10	10	10	9	9	9	8	9	10	4	12	17	8	5	5	7	126	9th
2009	**B**				QAT	JPN	ESP	FRA	ITA	CAT	NED	USA	GER	GBR	CZE	IND	RSM	POR	AUS	MAL	VAL			
2009	**B**	(Japan) **Repsol Honda Team**	3	(Spain) Dani Pedrosa	11	3	2	**3**	Ret	6	Ret	1	3	9	2	**10**	3	3	3	2	1		**234**	**3rd**
2009	**B**	(Japan) **Repsol Honda Team**	4	(Italy) Andrea Dovizioso	5	5	8	4	4	4	Ret	Ret	Ret	1	4	4	4	7	6	Ret	8		160	6th
2009	**B**	(Monaco) LCR Honda MotoGP	14	(France) Randy de Puniet	10	11	4	14	8	8	7	9	Ret	3	10	12	12	11	8	Ret	11		106	11th
2009	**B**	(Italy) San Carlo Honda Gresini	15	(San Marino) Alex de Angelis	6	13	14	11	15	12	10	11	5	4	8	2	Ret	Ret	4	12	10		111	9th
2009	**B**	(Italy) San Carlo Honda Gresini	24	(Spain) Toni Elías	9	15	9	10	14	Ret	12	6	6	Ret	3	9	6	6	10	7	6		115	7th
2009	**B**	(San Marino) Scot Racing Team	41	(Hungary) Gábor Talmácsi						17	16	Ret	15	12	13	14	14	14	13	14	16		19	17th
2009	**B**	(San Marino) Scot Racing Team	72	(Japan) Yuki Takahashi	15	Ret	12	13	Ret	Ret	15												9	21st
2010	**B**				QAT	ESP	FRA	ITA	GBR	NED	CAT	GER	USA	CZE	IND	RSM	ARA	JPN	MAL	AUS	POR	VAL		
2010	**B**	(Japan) **Repsol Honda Team**	4	(Italy) Andrea Dovizioso	3	6	3	3	2	5	14	5	4	Ret	5	4	Ret	**2**	2	Ret	3	5	206	5th
2010	**B**	(Japan) **Repsol Honda Team**	26	(Spain) Dani Pedrosa	7	**2**	5	**1**	8	2	2	1	Ret	**2**	1	**1**	2	DNS		DNS	8	7	**245**	**2nd**
2010	**B**	(Switzerland) Interwetten Honda MotoGP Team	7	(Japan) Hiroshi Aoyama	10	14	11	11	DNS						12	12	13	10	7	13	12	14	53	15th
2010	**B**	(Switzerland) Interwetten Honda MotoGP Team	15	(San Marino) Alex de Angelis								12	12	13									11	18th
2010	**B**	(Switzerland) Interwetten Honda MotoGP Team	64	(Japan) Kousuke Akiyoshi (Note: Kousuke Akiyoshi stood in for the injured Hiroshi Aoyama at the Interwetten Honda team.)						15	13												4	20th
2010	**B**	(Monaco) LCR Honda MotoGP	14	(France) Randy de Puniet	6	9	7	6	6	6	4	Ret		10	13	13	Ret	9	10	10	6	10	116	9th
2010	**B**	(Monaco) LCR Honda MotoGP	95	(United States) Roger Lee Hayden									11										5	19th
2010	**B**	(Italy) San Carlo Honda Gresini	33	(Italy) Marco Melandri	13	8	6	5	Ret	DNS	9	10	8	8	Ret	10	9	11	9	9	9	13	103	10th
2010	**B**	(Italy) San Carlo Honda Gresini	58	(Italy) Marco Simoncelli	11	11	10	9	7	9	Ret	6	Ret	11	7	14	7	6	8	6	4	6	125	8th
2011	**B**				QAT	ESP	POR	FRA	CAT	GBR	NED	ITA	GER	USA	CZE	IND	RSM	ARA	JPN	AUS	MAL	VAL		
2011	**B**	(Japan) **Repsol Honda Team**	4	(Italy) Andrea Dovizioso	4	12	4	2	4	2	3	2	4	5	2	5	5	Ret	5	3	C	3	**228**	**3rd**
2011	**B**	(Japan) **Repsol Honda Team**	7	(Japan) Hiroshi Aoyama (Note: Aoyama replaced Dani Pedrosa on the factory-spec Repsol Honda bike for the Dutch TT in Assen, after Pedrosa's injury at the French Grand Prix)							8												8 (98)	10th
2011	**B**	(Japan) **Repsol Honda Team**	26	(Spain) Dani Pedrosa	3	2	1	Ret				8	1	3	**Ret**	2	2	2	1	4	**C**	5	219	4th
2011	**B**	(Japan) **Repsol Honda Team**	27	(Australia) Casey Stoner	**1**	**Ret**	3	**1**	1	**1**	2	**3**	**3**	1	1	**1**	**3**	**1**	**3**	**1**	C	**1**	**350**	**1st**
2011	**B**	(Japan) Honda Racing Team	72	(Japan) Shinichi Ito (Note: At the Motegi GP in Japan in 2011, Ito and countryman Kousuke Akiyoshi were given wildcard rides in order to "bring courage and show support for the East Japan area", which has been suffering greatly in the aftermath of the 2011 Tōhoku earthquake and tsunami. Ito will racing for HRC Honda - rode a factory-spec Honda RC212V bike.)															13				3	22nd
2011	**B**	(Italy) San Carlo Honda Gresini	7	(Japan) Hiroshi Aoyama	10	4	7	8	Ret	9		11	15	10	9	9	11	11	9	Ret	C	12	90 (98)	10th
2011	**B**	(Italy) San Carlo Honda Gresini	58	(Italy) **Marco Simoncelli**	5	Ret	Ret	5	**6**	Ret	**9**	5	6	Ret	3	12	4	4	4	2	C (Note: Marco Simoncelli was fatally injured during the Malaysian Grand Prix and the race was abandoned as a result.)		139	6th
2011	**B**	(Italy) San Carlo Honda Gresini	64	(Japan) Kousuke Akiyoshi (Note: Akiyoshi replaced Aoyama once again at the Gresini Racing team for the 2011 Dutch TT, however not through injury, as Aoyama himself replaced the injured Dani Pedrosa at Repsol Honda.)							13												3 (7)	20th
2011	**B**	(Monaco) LCR Honda MotoGP	23	(United States) Ben Bostrom										Ret									0	NC
2011	**B**	(Monaco) LCR Honda MotoGP	24	(Spain) Toni Elías	Ret	9	11	11	13	8	10	15	16	13	11	13	15	Ret	Ret	8	C	10	61	15th
2011	**B**	(Monaco) LCR Honda MotoGP	64	(Japan) Kousuke Akiyoshi (Note: Akiyoshi also competed at the Japanese Grand Prix as a wildcard entry with LCR Honda – along with Shinichi Ito, racing for HRC Honda – as a gesture of support for those affected by the March 2011 Tōhoku earthquake and tsunami.)															12				4 (7)	20th
