= John Hopkins (motorcyclist) =

American motorcycle racer

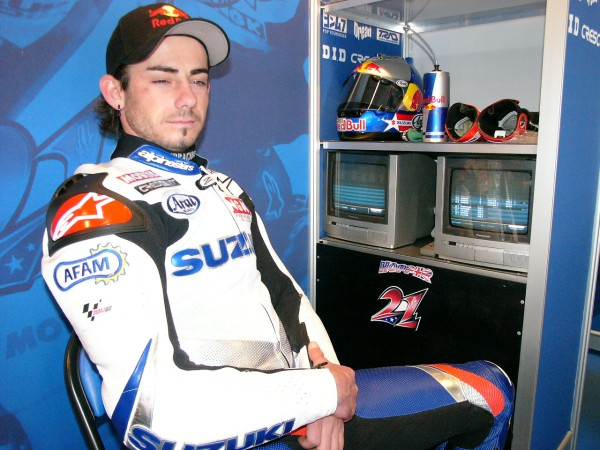
- Nationality: American
- Born: 22 May 1983 (age 43); Ramona, California, U.S.
Motorcycle racing career statistics
MotoGP World Championship
Active years	2002–2008, 2011
Manufacturers	Yamaha, Suzuki, Kawasaki
Championships	0
2011 championship position	21st (6 pts)
Starts / Wins / Podiums / Poles / F. laps / Points; 112 / 0 / 4 / 1 / 2 / 563
Superbike World Championship
Active years	2009, 2011–2012
Manufacturers	Honda, Suzuki
Championships	0
2012 championship position	19th (44 pts)
Starts / Wins / Podiums / Poles / F. laps / Points; 28 / 0 / 0 / 1 / 0 / 81
British Superbike Championship
Active years	2011
Manufacturers	Suzuki
Championships	0
2011 championship position	2nd (645 pts)
Starts / Wins / Podiums / Poles / F. laps / Points; 23 / 5 / 16 / 3 / 2 / 645

John "Hopper" Hopkins (born May 22, 1983) is an American former motorcycle road racer. He recently competed in the British Superbike Championship aboard a Ducati 1199 Panigale for Moto Rapido Racing.

== Early life ==
Hopkins was born to parents from Acton. He began riding Motocross bikes as a child and won his first race on a MiniBike in 1986, switching to road racing full-time in 1999 in MotoAmerica, winning titles in AMA Supersport and Formula Xtreme. Hopkins proposed to his girlfriend Ashleigh in the summer of 2007 on her 21st birthday. They married in Las Vegas in December 2007.

Hopkins is featured in the 2003 documentary film, Faster, and the film The Doctor, the Tornado and the Kentucky Kid (2006).

In a 2007 interview, Hopkins was questioned about being regarded as Anglo-American, with the interviewer commenting: "A lot of people don't understand your being British. As I understand it, your entire family moved over here from England, and you were raised here as a British family in America".

== Career ==
=== MotoGP World Championship ===
==== 2002 ====
The 2002 season saw Hopkins join the WCM RedBull Yamaha team alongside multiple race winner Garry McCoy. The team was using Yamaha YZR500 motorcycles on lease from Yamaha. Overall the YZR500 was considered to be uncompetitive that year, due to a change in the regulations allowing 990 cc four-stroke motorcycles to race against 500 cc two-stroke motorcycles. Although the two-strokes held (on average) a 10 kg weight advantage over the four-strokes, they had between 30 and 50 less hp depending on the engine configuration used for the racetrack. Hopkins finished the season ranked 15th, with 58 points, which put him 25 points clear of his teammate McCoy.

==== 2003 ====
In 2003, Hopkins joined the Suzuki factory racing team. This year he would ride a 990 cc V4 four-stroke. In 2003, he was teamed with 2000 500cc world champion Kenny Roberts Jr. Although he was racing a four-stroke this year, the results did not seem to come as one would have expected. There are many theories for this, including the Suzuki's lack of power and its tendency to wear out tires faster than other bikes. This year also saw Hopkins involved in a turn 1 crash at the Pacific Grand Prix at Motegi; he was accused of causing this crash, and was suspended for one race. This suspension resulted in a DNS (did not start) at the Malaysian Grand Prix. Also noteworthy for the 2003 season was the crash in Italy where Roberts' GSV-R Suzuki suffered an engine management failure and the bike launched into Hopkins, putting both GSV-R's out of the race. At the end of the season, Hopkins finished in 17th place with 29 points. This finish put him two places and seven points ahead of his teammate Roberts.

==== 2004 ====
The technology and technical advancement of the GSV-R was further developed in 2004. Most of the refinements took place in the engine management package, making the bike easier to ride. Towards the end of the year, the GSV-R was showing clear improvements, allowing Hopkins to move up the standings. Unfortunately it also saw several mechanical failures, which effectively undid the hard work to develop the motorcycle. Having qualified on the front row at Motegi, he was eliminated in a first-corner crash. Overall, he finished 16th.

==== 2005 ====
Hopkins continued with Suzuki in 2005, as the team showed promising signs after the arrival of Paul Denning as team boss following Denning's success with Suzuki's British Superbike team. Hopkins briefly led at Donington, but his best result was a fifth place at Motegi, and he was 14th overall. Qualifying results were often better than race results, largely due to Bridgestone tires being better suited to short runs.

==== 2006 ====
Hopkins remained at Suzuki, now backed by Rizla, where he was joined by new teammate Chris Vermeulen. He enjoyed his best season yet. Hopkins finished the 2006 season in tenth place overall with 116 points. Hopkins had one pole position this season, at Assen. His best finishes were in China and in Catalunya, where he finished fourth.

==== 2007 ====
Continuing with Rizla Suzuki, Hopkins set near-lap-record times aboard the new 800 cc motorcycle, and was labeled the dark horse by Colin Edwards. On February 15, 2007, he fractured his wrist after falling while testing at the Jerez circuit in Spain, but returned for the start of the season.

Hopkins completed his first MotoGP podium finish at the Shanghai circuit in China, finishing in third place – 3.6 seconds behind Valentino Rossi but 7.6 seconds ahead of 2006 event winner Dani Pedrosa. He finished as fourth overall in the 2007 season, two places ahead of Vermeulen and one behind Rossi.

==== 2008 ====
For 2008, Hopkins joined Kawasaki Racing Team. Explaining the decision, Rizla Suzuki boss Paul Denning suggested that "There are reasons for that other than performance," highlighting commercial concerns in particular. Hopkins crashed heavily at Assen, fracturing his ankle.

Prior to 2009 season, Kawasaki made the decision to halt MotoGP racing activities because of the global economic crisis, meaning that Hopkins would not have a ride for the 2009 season.

==== 2011 ====
Hopkins returned to MotoGP in the Spanish motorcycle Grand Prix in April 2011 as a temporary replacement for Álvaro Bautista in the Suzuki team.

=== Superbike World Championship ===
==== 2009 ====
After the Kawasaki team pulled out of MotoGP, Hopkins secured a mid season ride on the Stiggy Racing Honda replacing Roberto Rolfo. Hopkins scored points during his first round in Valencia. At the next round in Assen, Hopkins would fall and dislocate his hip, Hopkins then wouldn't return until San Marino where he couldn't complete the weekend's racing. After a career best finish in the first race at Donington, Hopkins, who was still hurt, couldn't complete the second race. Following two retirements at the Brno round, Hopkins would suffer a horror crash at the Nürburgring, being run over after he was taken out by Makoto Tamada and Broc Parkes, Hopkins was unconscious for ten minutes but luckily sustained no serious injuries. The Stiggy Honda team then withdrew from the World Superbike paddock leaving Hopkins once again without a ride for 2010.

==== 2011 ====
In 2011, Hopkins rode his Samsung Crescent Suzuki at the Silverstone World Superbike round. Hopkins was fast from the start being fastest in free practice sessions, capturing his first Superbike World Championship pole position with a new circuit record lap.

==== 2012 ====
In January 2012, Hopkins had his right ring-finger amputated just above the first joint up from the knuckle.

Hopkins missed the first race of the season after a testing crash, ironically breaking the knuckle below the stump from the finger he had chopped off at the start of the year.

==== 2013 ====
In October 2012, Hopkins announced that he would be taking the 2013 season off to recover from his injuries. In April 2013, Hopkins had hip replacement surgery following a heavy crash at Monza, but announced at the Le Mans MotoGP event in May that he would be testing again within two months.

=== AMA Superbike Championship ===
==== 2010 ====
After one season in SBK, Hopkins returned to United States racing - he was considered a superstar in the AMA. He raced for the M4 Monster Suzuki team.

=== British Superbike Championship ===
==== 2011 ====
For the 2011 season, Hopkins raced in the British Superbike Championship. He rode for the Crescent Suzuki team. At Oulton Park, he won the second race making history, being the first American to win a British Superbike race. Hopkins made history yet again at the new Snetterton 300 where he won the first British Superbike race.

Hopkins came within 0.006 seconds of winning the title, losing out to Tommy Hill on the last lap of the final round at Brands Hatch.

==== 2014 ====
On October 29, 2013, it was announced that Hopkins, after taking a year out to recover from multiple injuries, would return to the British Superbike Championship for 2014 having signed to ride for Tyco Suzuki.

==== 2015 ====
In July 2015; Hopkins joined the MCE British Superbike Championship, replacing Jakub Smrz for the Lloyds British Moto Rapido Ducati. His first race took place at Brands Hatch (Round 6) where he placed 6th in Race 1 and had a DNF in Race 2.

== Life after racing ==
=== Coaching career ===
After injuries prevented Hopkins from a comeback in racing he was offered a position as the riders' coach and race director for the American Racing team in Moto2 for the 2020 season.

Hopkins arrival had an immediate impact upon American Racing's Joe Roberts, who at the time was the only American racing in any motorcycle road racing world championship. Roberts would take his first two pole positions, his first podium finish, and would be a consistent top ten finisher under Hopkins' tutelage. Hopkins nearly moved back to up to MotoGP when Roberts was in negotiations with Aprilia, with Aprilia making a concession to allow Hopkins to remain Roberts' rider coach should Roberts move up to MotoGP. Roberts ultimately declined the move to MotoGP and Hopkins stayed with American Racing.

Hopkins was the riders' coach for series veteran Marcos Ramirez and American Cameron Beaubier during his Moto2 stint.

=== Autobiography ===
Hopkins' autobiography Leathered was released in September 2021.

== Career statistics ==
=== Grand Prix motorcycle racing ===
==== By season ====
Season	Class	Motorcycle	Team	Number	Race	Win	Podium	Pole	FLap	Pts	Plcd	WCh
2002	MotoGP	Yamaha YZR500	Red Bull Yamaha WCM	21	15	0	0	0	0	58	15th	–
2003	MotoGP	Suzuki GSV-R	Suzuki Grand Prix Team	21	14	0	0	0	0	29	17th	–
2004	MotoGP	Suzuki GSV-R	Team Suzuki MotoGP	21	15	0	0	0	0	45	16th	–
2005	MotoGP	Suzuki GSV-R	Team Suzuki MotoGP	21	17	0	0	0	0	63	14th	–
2006	MotoGP	Suzuki GSV-R	Rizla Suzuki MotoGP	21	17	0	0	1	0	116	10th	–
2007	MotoGP	Suzuki GSV-R	Rizla Suzuki MotoGP	21	18	0	4	0	2	189	4th	–
2008	MotoGP	Kawasaki Ninja ZX-RR	Kawasaki Racing Team	21	15	0	0	0	0	57	16th	–
2011	MotoGP	Suzuki GSV-R	Rizla Suzuki MotoGP	21	1	0	0	0	0	6	21st	–
Total					**112**	**0**	**4**	**1**	**2**	**563**		**0**

==== By class ====
Class	Seasons	1st GP	1st Pod	1st Win	Race	Win	Podiums	Pole	FLap	Pts	WChmp
MotoGP	2002–2008, 2011	2002 Japan	2007 China		112	0	4	1	2	563	0
Total	2002–2008, 2011				**112**	**0**	**4**	**1**	**2**	**563**	**0**

==== Races by year ====
(key) (Races in bold indicate pole position, races in italics indicate fastest lap)

Year	Class	Bike	1	2	3	4	5	6	7	8	9	10	11	12	13	14	15	16	17	18	Pos	Pts
2002	MotoGP	Yamaha	JPN; 12	RSA; 13	SPA; 14	FRA; 11	ITA; 12	CAT; 10	NED; 7	GBR; 8	GER	CZE; Ret	POR; 8	BRA; 14	PAC; 14	MAL; 18	AUS; 16	VAL; 11			15th	58
2003	MotoGP	Suzuki	JPN; 13	RSA; 13	SPA; 7	FRA; Ret	ITA; Ret	CAT; 15	NED; 15	GBR; 11	GER; Ret	CZE; 17	POR; 18	BRA	PAC; Ret	MAL	AUS; 12	VAL; 13			17th	29
2004	MotoGP	Suzuki	RSA; 13	SPA; 15	FRA; Ret	ITA	CAT; Ret	NED; 14	BRA; 15	GER; 9	GBR; 8	CZE; Ret	POR; 6	JPN; Ret	QAT; 8	MAL; Ret	AUS; 15	VAL; 12			16th	45
2005	MotoGP	Suzuki	SPA; 14	POR; Ret	CHN; 7	FRA; 16	ITA; 11	CAT; Ret	NED; 14	USA; 8	GBR; 11	GER; DNS	CZE; 14	JPN; 5	MAL; 9	QAT; 17	AUS; 10	TUR; 15	VAL; 13		14th	63
2006	MotoGP	Suzuki	SPA; 9	QAT; Ret	TUR; 17	CHN; 4	FRA; 15	ITA; 10	CAT; 4	**NED**; 6	GBR; 8	GER; 10	USA; 6	CZE; 7	MAL; 6	AUS; 12	JPN; 12	POR; 6	VAL; 11		10th	116
2007	MotoGP	Suzuki	QAT; 4	SPA; 19	TUR; 6	CHN; 3	FRA; 7	ITA; 5	CAT; 4	GBR; 5	NED; 5	GER; 7	USA; 15	CZE; 2	RSM; 3	POR; 6	JPN; 10	AUS; 7	MAL; 8	VAL; 3	4th	189
2008	MotoGP	Kawasaki	QAT; 12	SPA; 7	POR; 5	CHN; 14	FRA; Ret	ITA; Ret	CAT; 10	GBR; Ret	NED; DNS	GER	USA	CZE; 11	RSM; 14	INP; 14	JPN; 10	AUS; 13	MAL; 11	VAL; 14	16th	57
2011	MotoGP	Suzuki	QAT	SPA; 10	POR	FRA	CAT	GBR	NED	ITA	GER	USA	CZE; DNS	INP	RSM	ARA	JPN	AUS	MAL; C	VAL	21st	6

=== Superbike World Championship ===
==== Races by year ====
(key) (Races in bold indicate pole position, races in italics indicate fastest lap)

Year	Bike	1		2		3		4		5		6		7		8		9		10		11		12		13		14		Pos	Pts
Year	Bike	R1	R2	R1	R2	R1	R2	R1	R2	R1	R2	R1	R2	R1	R2	R1	R2	R1	R2	R1	R2	R1	R2	R1	R2	R1	R2	R1	R2	Pos	Pts
2009	Honda	AUS	AUS	QAT	QAT	SPA; 11	SPA; 12	NED	NED	ITA	ITA	RSA	RSA	USA	USA	SMR; DNS	SMR; DNS	GBR; 8	GBR; DNS	CZE; Ret	CZE; Ret	GER; Ret	GER; DNS	ITA	ITA	FRA	FRA	POR	POR	23rd	17
2011	Suzuki	AUS	AUS	EUR	EUR	NED	NED	ITA	ITA	USA	USA	SMR	SMR	SPA	SPA	CZE	CZE	**GBR**; 5	**GBR**; 7	GER	GER	ITA	ITA	FRA	FRA	POR	POR			19th	20
2012	Suzuki	AUS	AUS	ITA; 13	ITA; Ret	NED; Ret	NED; 11	ITA; C	ITA; DNS	EUR	EUR	USA; Ret	USA; 16	SMR; 17	SMR; 14	SPA; 15	SPA; Ret	CZE; 15	CZE; 14	GBR; Ret	GBR; 10	RUS; 9	RUS; 12	GER; 13	GER; 13	POR; 12	POR; 11	FRA; DNS	FRA; DNS	19th	44

=== AMA Superbike Championship ===
==== Races by year ====
(key)

Year	Bike	1		2		3		4		5		6		7	8		9		10		Pos	Pts	Ref
Year	Bike	R1	R2	R1	R2	R1	R2	R1	R2	R1	R2	R1	R2	R1	R1	R2	R1	R2	R1	R2	Pos	Pts	Ref
2010	Suzuki	DAY; DNS	DAY; Ret	FON; 7	FON; 5	RAT; 5	RAT; 5	INF	INF	RAM	RAM	M-O	M-O	LAG	VIR; 15	VIR; DNS	N-J; 5	N-J; 3	BAR; 3	BAR; 2	10th	151	

=== British Superbike Championship ===
==== Races by year ====
(key) (Races in bold indicate pole position, races in italics indicate fastest lap)

Year	Bike	1		2		3		4		5		6		7		8			9			10		11		12			Pos	Pts	Ref
Year	Bike	R1	R2	R1	R2	R1	R2	R1	R2	R1	R2	R1	R2	R1	R2	R1	R2	R3	R1	R2	R3	R1	R2	R1	R2	R1	R2	R3	Pos	Pts	Ref
2011	Suzuki	BHI; 17	BHI; 5	OUL; 2	OUL; 1	CRO; 2	CRO; 3	THR; 4	THR; 3	KNO; 2	KNO; Ret	**SNE**; 1	SNE; 3	**OUL**; Ret	OUL; C	BHGP; 4	BHGP; 3	BHGP; 2	CAD^{1}	CAD^{1}	CAD^{1}	DON; 1	**DON**; 1	SIL; 1	SIL; 3	BHGP; 3	BHGP; 12	BHGP; 3	**2nd**	**645**^{2}	

Year	Make	1			2			3			4			5			6			7			8			9			10			11			12			Pos	Pts
Year	Make	R1	R2	R3	R1	R2	R3	R1	R2	R3	R1	R2	R3	R1	R2	R3	R1	R2	R3	R1	R2	R3	R1	R2	R3	R1	R2	R3	R1	R2	R3	R1	R2	R3	R1	R2	R3	Pos	Pts
2014	Suzuki	BHI; 5	BHI; 11		OUL; Ret	OUL; 9		SNE; 9	SNE; 7		KNO; 9	KNO; 11		BHGP; 9	BHGP; 10		THR; 8	THR; 8		OUL; 6	OUL; Ret	OUL; Ret	CAD; 13	CAD; DNS		**DON**; Ret	DON; 9		ASS; Ret	ASS; 5		SIL; Ret	SIL; DNS		BHGP; Ret	BHGP; 10	BHGP; 8	10th	125

Year	Make	1		2		3			4		5		6			7		8			9			10		11		12			Pos	Pts
Year	Make	R1	R2	R1	R2	R1	R2	R3	R1	R2	R1	R2	R1	R2	R3	R1	R2	R1	R2	R3	R1	R2	R3	R1	R2	R1	R2	R1	R2	R3	Pos	Pts
2015	Suzuki	DON	DON	BHI	BHI	OUL	OUL		SNE	SNE	KNO	KNO	BHGP; 6	BHGP; Ret		THR; Ret	THR; Ret	CAD; 16	CAD; Ret		OUL; Ret	OUL; Ret	OUL; Ret	ASS; 5	ASS; 11	SIL; 4	SIL; Ret	BHGP; 3	BHGP; 4	BHGP; 8	17th	76
2016	Yamaha	SIL; 9	SIL; Ret	OUL; 11	OUL; Ret	BHI; 12	BHI; 11		KNO; 4	KNO; Ret	SNE	SNE	THR	THR		BHGP; 15	BHGP; Ret	CAD; 14	CAD; 15		OUL; 12	OUL; Ret	OUL; Ret	DON; 9	DON; Ret	ASS; 10	ASS; 15	BHGP; 7	BHGP; 2	BHGP; 2	14th	105
2017	Ducati	DON; Ret	DON; 13	BHI; 13	BHI; 9	OUL; 14	OUL; 9		KNO; 7	KNO; 17	SNE; 8	SNE; 5	BHGP; 9	BHGP; 11		THR; 9	THR; Ret	CAD; DNS	CAD; DNS		SIL; 3	SIL; 10	SIL; Ret	OUL; 2	OUL; Ret	ASS; 9	ASS; 12	BHGP; DNS	BHGP; DNS	BHGP; DNS	15th	122

1. – Hopkins was not entered for the Cadwell race due to an injury he sustained during his wildcard ride for Suzuki at the MotoGP event in Brno.

2. – Hopkins qualified for "The Showdown" part of the BSB season, thus before the Donington Park round he was awarded 500 points plus the podium credits he had gained throughout the season. Podium credits are given to anyone finishing 1st, 2nd or 3rd, with 3,2 and 1 points awarded respectively.

== Bibliography ==
- Hopkins, John (September 1, 2021). Leathered: A Life Taken to Extremes... on and Off the Bike. Cassell. ISBN 978-1788402774.
