= Maverick Viñales =

Spanish motorcycle racer (born 1995)

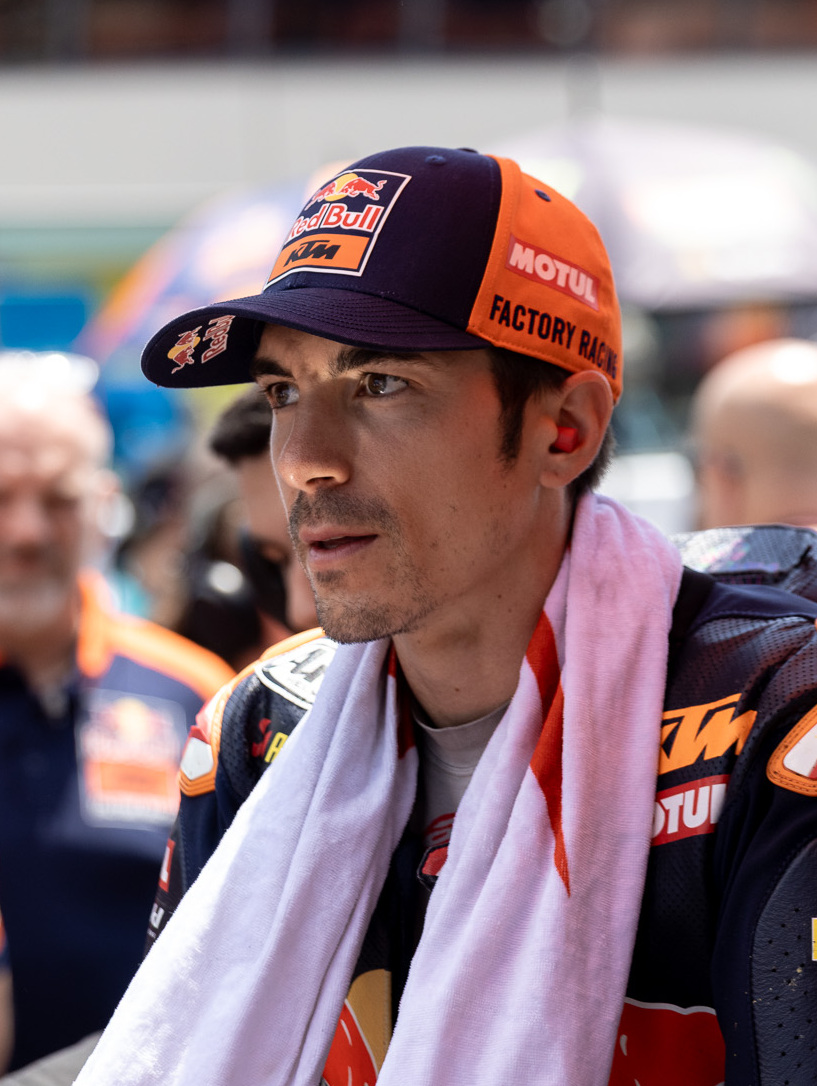
- Viñales at the 2025 Italian Grand Prix
- Nationality: Spanish
- Born: 12 January 1995 (age 31); Figueres, Spain
- Current team: Red Bull KTM Tech3
- Bike number: 12
Motorcycle racing career statistics
MotoGP World Championship
Active years	2015–
Manufacturers	Suzuki (2015–2016); Yamaha (2017–2021); Aprilia (2021–2024); KTM (2025–)
Championships	0
2025 championship position	18th (72 pts)
Starts / Wins / Podiums / Poles / F. laps / Points; 200 / 10 / 35 / 15 / 12 / 1771
Moto2 World Championship
Active years	2014
Manufacturers	Kalex
Championships	0
2014 championship position	3rd (274 pts)
Starts / Wins / Podiums / Poles / F. laps / Points; 18 / 4 / 9 / 1 / 5 / 274
Moto3 World Championship
Active years	2012–2013
Manufacturers	FTR Honda (2012); KTM (2013)
Championships	1 (2013)
2013 championship position	1st (323 pts)
Starts / Wins / Podiums / Poles / F. laps / Points; 32 / 8 / 22 / 7 / 4 / 530
125cc World Championship
Active years	2011
Manufacturers	Aprilia
Championships	0
2011 championship position	3rd (248 pts)
Starts / Wins / Podiums / Poles / F. laps / Points; 17 / 4 / 9 / 3 / 3 / 248

Maverick Viñales Ruiz (Spanish pronunciation: [biˈɲales ˈrwiθ]; born 12 January 1995) is a Spanish Grand Prix motorcycle racer, riding for Red Bull KTM Tech3 in the MotoGP class. He won the 2013 Moto3 World Championship. After five seasons as a MotoGP factory rider with the Yamaha Factory Racing team, his contract was terminated by mutual consent midway through the 2021 season. He raced with the Aprilia Racing team in the 2022-2024 seasons before moving to Red Bull KTM Tech3 in 2025.

== Career ==
=== Early career ===
Born in Figueres, Alt Empordà, Viñales began competitive racing at the age of three in minimotos before moving onto motocross and eventually to circuit racing in 2002, competing in the Catalan 50cc Championship, before several successful seasons in 70cc "metrakit" bikes. In 2007, he became champion of the Catalan 125cc Championship, and repeated the feat in 2008, as well as winning the Mediterranean Trophy. Also in 2008, he competed at selected events in the German IDM 125GP Championship for RZT Racing aboard an Aprilia RS 125 R, achieving a best result of seventh. He moved up to the CEV Buckler 125GP series in 2009, with the Blusens-BQR team, partnering Miguel Oliveira in the team. Viñales finished the season as Rookie of the Year as he finished as the runner-up to Alberto Moncayo in the championship standings, by just four points. Viñales claimed four successive podiums during the season, including a victory at Jerez. In 2010, Viñales and Oliveira joined different teams from Blusens and battled it out for the championship title and despite winning only two races – both at Albacete – compared to Oliveira's four wins and two second places, Viñales took the title by just two points after finishing each of the season's seven races on the podium as Oliveira crashed out of one race at Albacete. The single race for the 2010 European Championship title was also taking place at Viñales's winning circuit Albacete where he narrowly took his third victory of the year at the same venue.

=== 125cc World Championship ===
==== Blusens-BQR Team (2011) ====
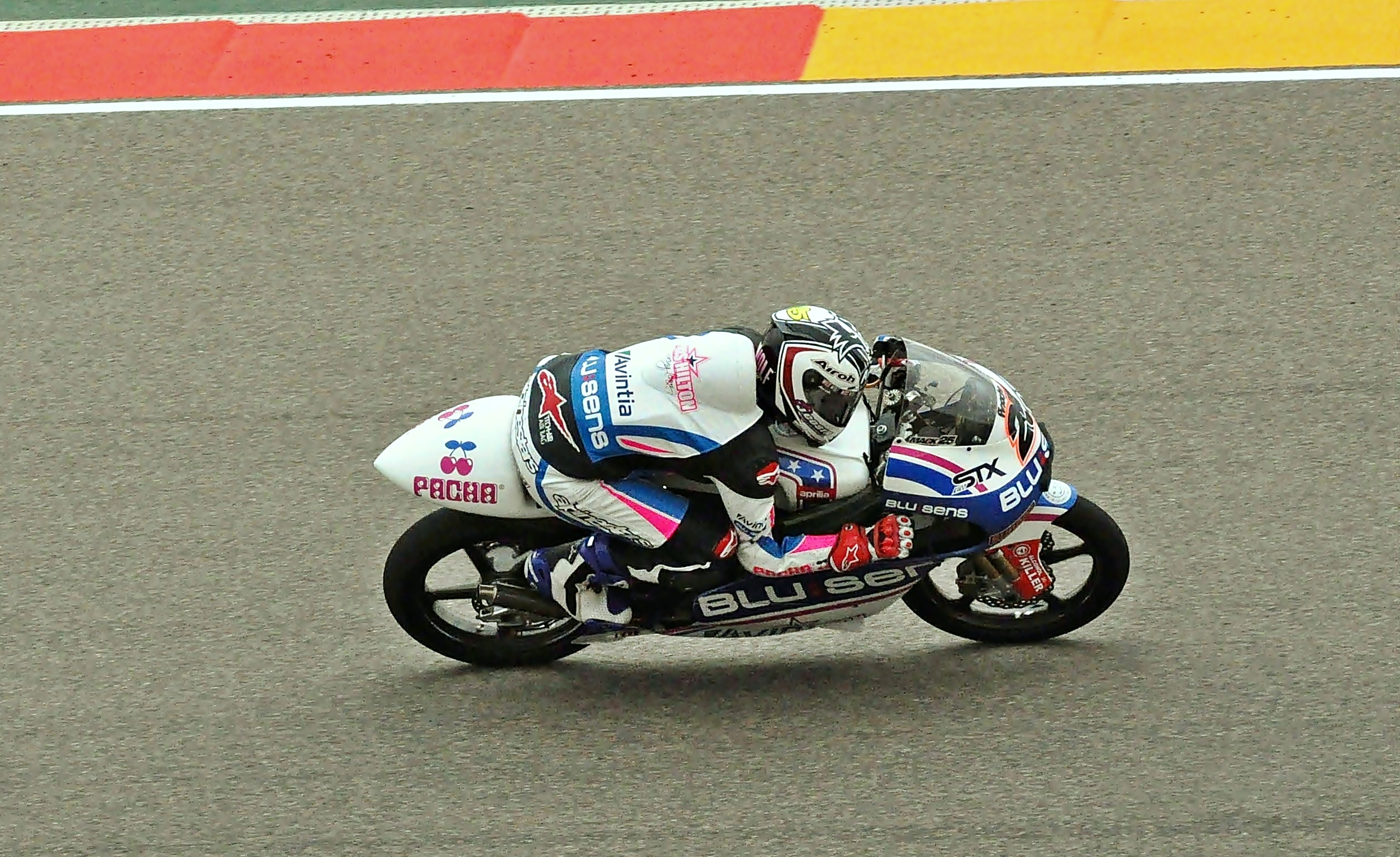
Viñales at the 2011 Aragon Grand Prix

Viñales moved to the 125cc World Championship ahead of the 2011 season, partnering category veteran Sergio Gadea, who returned to the 125cc class after a season in Moto2, at the SuperMartxé VIP team after the Blusens-BQR team joined forces with American socialite Paris Hilton. He impressed during pre-season testing at Valencia, and finished ninth on his Grand Prix début in Qatar. After retiring at Jerez due to brake failure, Viñales finished fourth at Estoril, narrowly missing out on a podium to Johann Zarco in a photo-finish with the margin between the pair being 0.002 seconds. Two weeks later at Le Mans, Viñales took his first front-row grid start with third place, and after a race-long battle with championship leader Nicolás Terol, Terol made a mistake at the penultimate corner and Viñales cut inside him and took the victory by 0.048 seconds. His victory, at the age of 16 years, 123 days, made him the third-youngest rider to win a Grand Prix race behind Scott Redding and Marco Melandri. Three further victories during the season enabled Viñales to finish his rookie season in third place in the championship rankings and he won the Rookie of the Year award.

=== Moto3 World Championship ===
==== Blusens Avintia (2012) ====
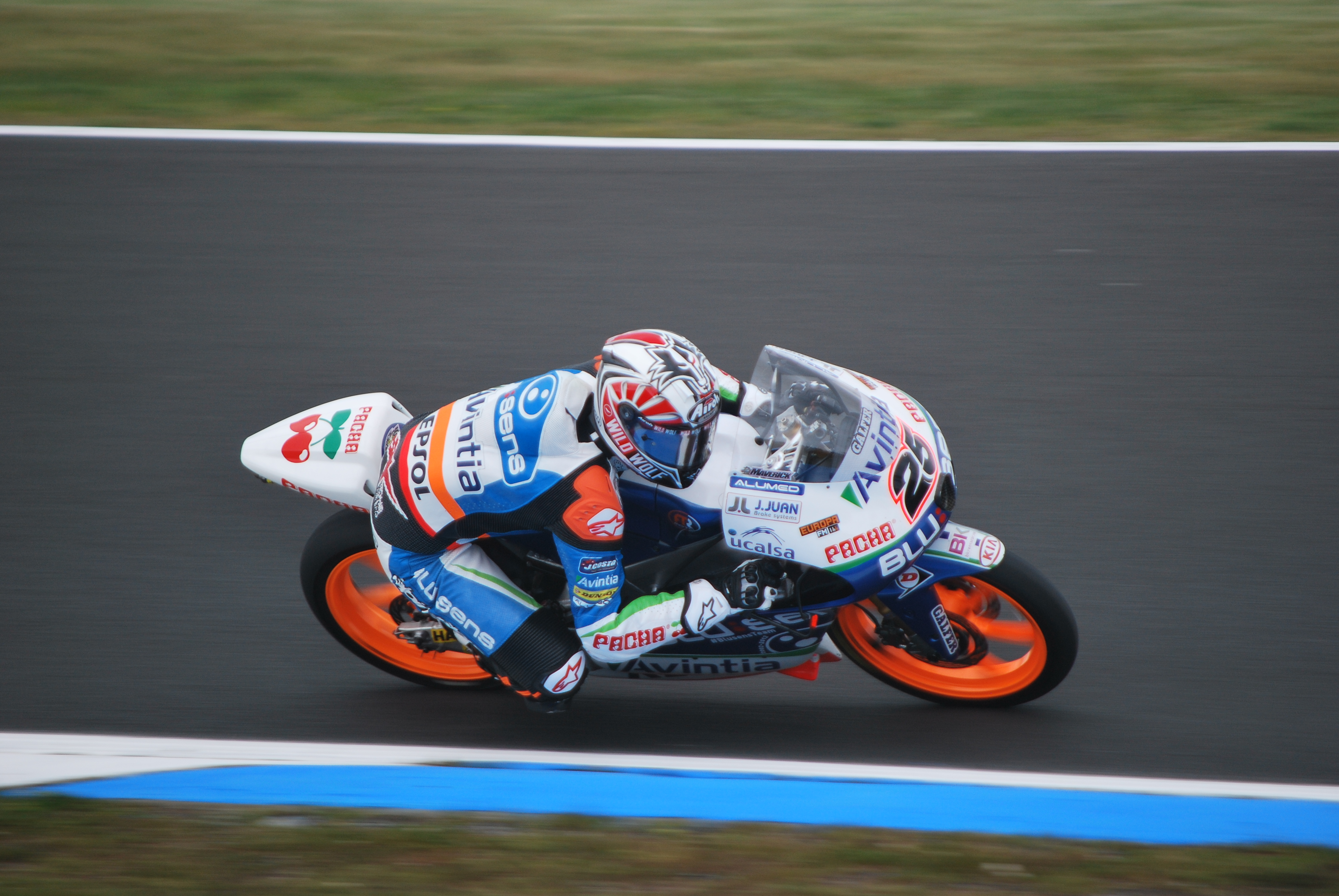
Viñales at the 2012 Australian Grand Prix

Viñales went into the 2012 season as title favourite in the newly formed Moto3 championship. He won five races early on in the season, but a lack of consistency with several crashes meant that he was not able to keep up with Sandro Cortese. Going into Malaysia still with a slim chance of winning the title, he shocked fans and media when he angrily left his team and flew back home, withdrawing from the race. Cortese won the race and the title with Luis Salom moving into second place. Viñales later stated that he had not been informed of offers from other Moto3 teams, that the team refused to move him up into Moto2 and instead made him sign an extension to his contract into 2014 and that he was unable to win with them as it was a "second division team". Viñales eventually apologized and returned to the team for the final two races of the season, securing third in the standings, but losing the runner-up spot to Salom.

==== Team Calvo (2013) ====
Viñales moved to Team Calvo for 2013, riding alongside Ana Carrasco. Sorting out his new contract after his walkout in Malaysia supposedly was a very delicate affair which included a high release fee having to be paid to his former team and interest also being expressed by the Marc VDS Moto3 team. He won his first two races with Team Calvo back-to-back at round three and four, the Spanish and French Grand Prix. In later races he had several opportunities to win as he was leading the last laps at San Marino, Aragon and Philip Island, but on all occasions he was eventually overtaken by fellow Spanish rider Álex Rins. He was starting to fade from the title fight with two races to go and only a slim chance left to win, but at Motegi both championship front runners Luis Salom and Alex Rins didn't score any points as both crashed out of the race, Salom being taken out by Viñales' cousin Isaac Viñales. Viñales finished second behind rookie Álex Márquez, putting him back into the title fight. The three riders went into the final round with a gap of just five points between them. As Salom crashed out and rejoined to finish 14th, Rins and Viñales continued battling until the last corner. In the end, Viñales narrowly took the victory and Moto3 World Championship with Rins finishing runner-up.

=== Moto2 World Championship ===
==== Pons Racing (2014) ====
===== 2014 =====
Viñales signed a two-year contract with Pons Racing, due to expire at the end of 2015. He joined former title rival Luis Salom in the team. He took his first intermediate class victory at the Circuit of the Americas on 13 April 2014. He ultimately finished the season in third place in the riders' championship with four wins and nine podiums. He also won the Rookie of the Year award.

=== MotoGP World Championship ===
==== Team Suzuki Ecstar (2015–2016) ====
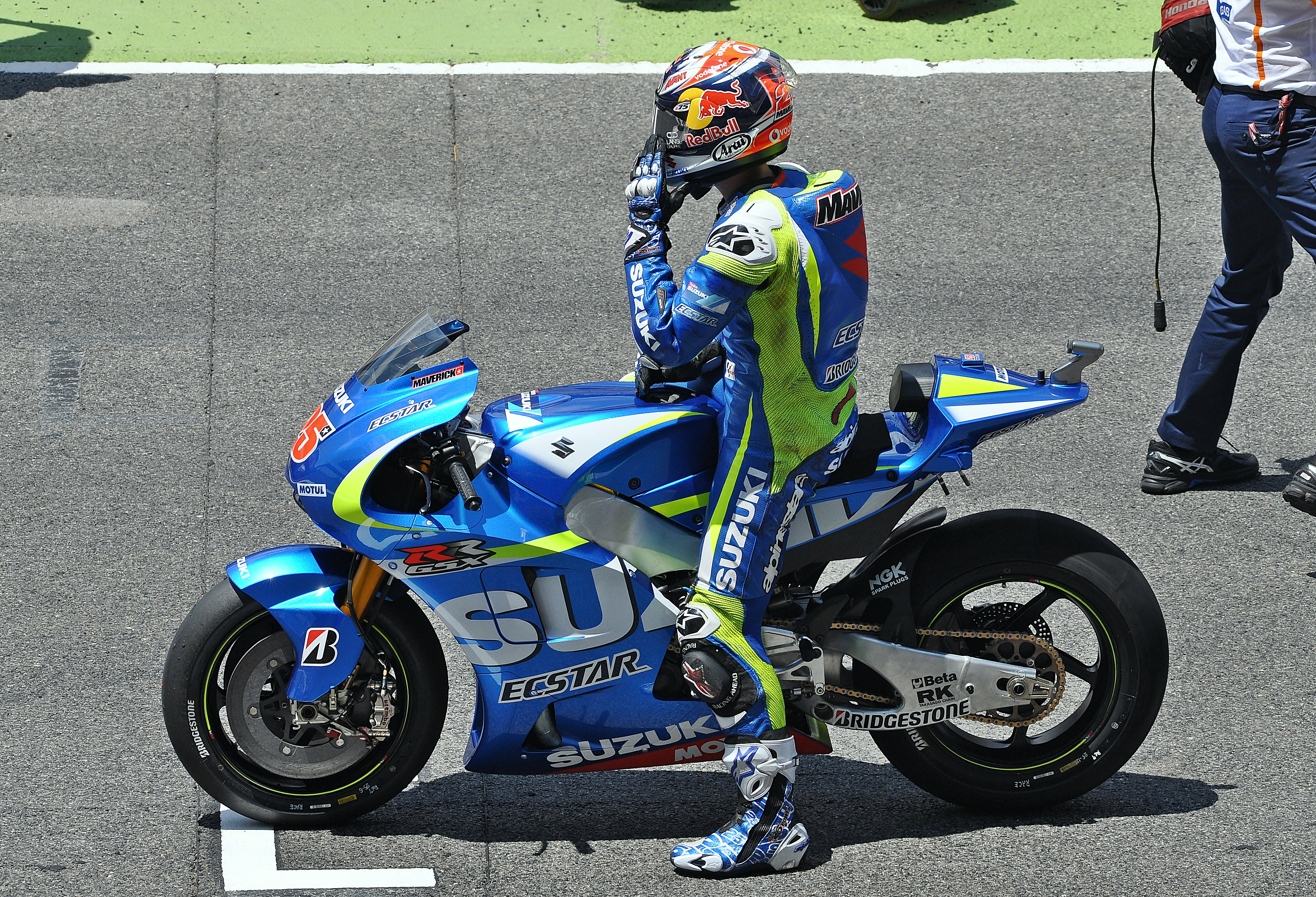
Viñales at the 2015 Catalan Grand Prix

In September 2014, it was announced that Viñales would move up to the MotoGP class for the 2015 season, riding for the factory Suzuki team on their return to the class. He partnered Aleix Espargaró at the team. Viñales became the first rider to move up to MotoGP after just one lone season in Moto2, even all-time greats like Valentino Rossi and Marc Márquez spent two years in the intermediate category.

===== 2015 =====
Viñales had a decent debut season with the factory Suzuki team. As it was the comeback year for the Japanese manufacturer, they received various concessions for development, and the bike underwent several changes during the season. Viñales finished 16 out of 18 races, scoring six top-ten results along the way, once again showing consistency as his strength. He ended the season in 12th place, winning the Rookie of the Year award.

===== 2016 =====
The 2016 season saw an improved bike and almost immediate success for Viñales and the factory Suzuki team. Viñales took his first MotoGP podium with third place in France. and his first ever MotoGP win at the British Grand Prix and Suzuki's first win since Chris Vermeulen's win in France in 2007, moving him to fourth place in the championship.

==== Monster Energy Yamaha MotoGP (2017–2021) ====
After Jorge Lorenzo announced his move to the Ducati team, Viñales was signed to replace him at the factory Yamaha team in 2017 and 2018.

===== 2017 =====
Viñales' 2017 MotoGP campaign started with victory in Qatar making him the first rider to win on debut for Yamaha since Valentino Rossi in 2004 and the first rider to win on a debut for any team since Casey Stoner in 2011. His strong start to the season continued with victory in Argentina, leading to many tipping Viñales as a championship contender. In the following race in the USA, there was disappointment when Viñales was forced to retire, crashing after only two laps from fourth place. Viñales followed this up with a sixth-place finish in Jerez and a hard-fought victory over Rossi at Le Mans. However, this was to be his last victory of the season. Viñales went on to take third in the rider's championship, finishing the season on 230 points, 22 points ahead of this teammate.

===== 2018 =====
At the Yamaha official season launch in January 2018, Viñales announced that he had signed a two-year contract extension, guaranteeing his factory seat through the 2020 season. The 2018 season was difficult for Viñales and a struggling Yamaha team. Despite a number of early season podiums for Viñales and his teammate Rossi, Yamaha set a new record winless streak of 25 races before Viñales scored a win at Phillip Island. Viñales finished the season with 193 points in fourth place of the rider's championship, five points behind his teammate.

===== 2019 =====
In November 2018, as the provisional 2019 entry list was published, Viñales confirmed he would be switching from his traditional race number 25 to the number 12 previously used by Troy Bayliss. Viñales claimed the change was because he "felt that [he] needed to do something different" and had previously used the number 12 in motocross as a youth, since his birthday is 12 January. Viñales won the Dutch TT and Malaysia, and took third in the rider's championship, finishing the season on 211 points.

===== 2020 =====
The 2020 season was shortened by the COVID-19 pandemic. Viñales started strongly in the Spanish opening double-header, with two second-place finishes. At the fifth round in Styria, Viñales suffered a brake malfunction on the 17th lap, forcing him to leap from the bike at high speed at the end of the start-finish straight, leading to a fiery crash and a red flag of the race. He struggled in later races, scoring one win in Emilia Romagna but only managing one other top-five finish in Aragon, before ending the season sixth overall in the championship standings.

===== 2021 =====
After struggling for consistency during the pandemic-shortened 2020 season, Viñales started 2021 with a dominating win in Qatar. Results in the following races were disappointing – while teammate Fabio Quartararo performed strongly to become a title favourite – culminating in the German Grand Prix where Viñales recorded his worst MotoGP weekend, qualifying 21st on the grid and finishing last of all classified riders. His fortunes looked to be improving at the subsequent Dutch TT, where he qualified on pole, but ultimately finished second behind teammate Quartararo to score just his second podium finish of the season. The following day on June 28, 2021, Viñales made the shock announcement that he had terminated his contract with Yamaha and would leave the factory team after the 2021 season prematurely and not see out the full term until the end of 2022.

Prior to the Austrian Grand Prix, Yamaha withdrew Viñales' entry citing telemetry data indicating "unexplained irregular operation of the motorcycle" during the Styrian Grand Prix. These irregularities led to his suspension by the team, as it was thought his actions could potentially have damaged the engine, putting himself and other riders at serious risk.

==== Aprilia Racing (2021–2024) ====
In August 2021, it was announced that Viñales would join the factory Aprilia racing team from 2022, initially on a one-year contract, joining existing rider Aleix Espargaró. On 20 August 2021, Yamaha and Viñales ended their contract with immediate effect, opening the door for Viñales to make an early debut with Aprilia at the Aragon Grand Prix on 12 September. Viñales took the place of regular team rider Lorenzo Savadori, who was injured in August and will continue to act as the team's test rider. Viñales finished the season tenth in the rider's standings, with 106 points.

===== 2022 =====
Viñales' first podium with Aprilia came at the Dutch TT. Then, he finished second in the British Grand Prix. He finished third for his third podium in four races at the San Marino Grand Prix.

===== 2023 =====
On 26 May 2022, Viñales signed a contract extension with the team for 2023 and 2024, still teaming up with Aleix Espargaró.

In the opening round of the 2023 season, Viñales scored his and Aprilia's first podium of the season at the Portuguese Grand Prix. His next podium was in Barcelona, where he finished behind teammate Aleix Espargaró in the first ever 1-2 finish for the factory Aprilia team in MotoGP. In the last race of the season, Viñales scored his first Aprilia pole position. He ended the season in seventh, only two points adrift of his teammate.

===== 2024 =====
In the 2024 Grand Prix of the Americas, Viñales scored, after winning the sprint race, his tenth win in his MotoGP career, making him the first MotoGP rider ever to win on three different manufacturers in the MotoGP era, with race wins on Suzuki, Yamaha and Aprilia bikes. This was also the last non-Ducati race victory until Johann Zarco won the 2025 French Grand Prix more than a year later.

==== Red Bull KTM Tech 3 (2025–2026) ====
On 13 June 2024, it was announced that Viñales signed for the Red Bull KTM Tech3 as an official factory rider, alongside former Ducati rider Enea Bastianini.

===== 2025 =====
Viñales briefly led the Qatar Grand Prix, making him the first rider ever to lead a race with four different manufacturers, finishing second on the road, only to lose the podium to a tyre pressure penalty which dropped him to 14th.

Viñales sustained an injury during the second qualifying session (Q2) of the German Grand Prix. He suffered a severe fall just minutes into Q2. Initial examinations at the medical center revealed a dislocated left shoulder. However, a more thorough examination determined that Viñales also had a fracture and a torn supraspinatus ligament, which supports shoulder movement. He successfully underwent surgery in Italy on Sunday, July 13, 2025. Viñales missed the Czech, Austrian, and Hungarian rounds of the championship as a result.

==== 2026 ====
After a three month hiatus, Viñales returned to racing at the Japanese Grand Prix. Viñales is set to leave Tech3 at the end of the 2026 season.

== Personal life ==
Viñales was named Maverick at birth because his father was a fan of Top Gun.

Viñales' cousin, Isaac, is also a motorcycle racer who has competed in the 125cc, Moto3 and Moto2 World Championships. As of 2023, Isaac races in World Superbike for Kawasaki. His other cousin, Dean Berta, was also a motorcycle racer; he died aged 15 on 25 September 2021 in a Supersport 300 race at Jerez after being involved in a collision.

== Career statistics ==
=== Grand Prix motorcycle racing ===
==== By season ====
Season	Class	Motorcycle	Team	Race	Win	Podium	Pole	FLap	Pts	Plcd	WCh
2011	125cc	Aprilia RSA 125	Blusens by Paris Hilton Racing	17	4	9	3	3	248	**3rd**	–
2012	Moto3	FTR M312	Blusens Avintia	15	5	7	5	1	207	**3rd**	–
2013	Moto3	KTM RC250GP	Team Calvo	17	3	15	2	3	323	**1st**	1
2014	Moto2	Kalex Moto2	Paginas Amarillas HP 40	18	4	9	1	5	274	**3rd**	–
2015	MotoGP	Suzuki GSX-RR	Team Suzuki Ecstar	18	0	0	0	0	97	12th	–
2016	MotoGP	Suzuki GSX-RR	Team Suzuki Ecstar	18	1	4	0	2	202	4th	–
2017	MotoGP	Yamaha YZR-M1	Movistar Yamaha MotoGP	18	3	7	5	4	230	**3rd**	–
2018	MotoGP	Yamaha YZR-M1	Movistar Yamaha MotoGP	18	1	5	1	2	193	4th	–
2019	MotoGP	Yamaha YZR-M1	Monster Energy Yamaha MotoGP	19	2	7	3	1	211	**3rd**	–
2020	MotoGP	Yamaha YZR-M1	Monster Energy Yamaha MotoGP	14	1	3	3	0	132	6th	–
2021	MotoGP	Yamaha YZR-M1	Monster Energy Yamaha MotoGP	10	1	2	1	1	95	10th	–
2021	MotoGP	Aprilia RS-GP	Aprilia Racing Team Gresini	5	0	0	0	0	11	10th	–
2022	MotoGP	Aprilia RS-GP	Aprilia Racing	20	0	3	0	0	122	11th	–
2023	MotoGP	Aprilia RS-GP	Aprilia Racing	20	0	3	1	1	204	7th	–
2024	MotoGP	Aprilia RS-GP	Aprilia Racing	20	1	1	1	1	190	7th	–
2025	MotoGP	KTM RC16	Red Bull KTM Tech3	14	0	0	0	0	72	18th	–
2026	MotoGP	KTM RC16	Red Bull KTM Tech3	10	0	0	0	0	12*	22nd*	–
Total				**266**	**26**	**75**	**26**	**24**	**2816**		**1**

==== By class ====
Class	Seasons	1st GP	1st pod	1st win	Race	Win	Podiums	Pole	FLap	Pts	WChmp
125cc	2011	2011 Qatar	2011 France	2011 France	17	4	9	3	3	248	0
Moto3	2012–2013	2012 Qatar	2012 Qatar	2012 Qatar	32	8	22	7	4	530	1
Moto2	2014	2014 Qatar	2014 Americas	2014 Americas	18	4	9	1	5	274	0
MotoGP	2015–present	2015 Qatar	2016 France	2016 Great Britain	199	10	35	15	12	1769	0
Total	2011–present				**266**	**26**	**75**	**26**	**24**	**2816**	**1**

==== Races by year ====
(key) (Races in bold indicate pole position, races in italics indicate fastest lap)

Year	Class	Bike	1	2	3	4	5	6	7	8	9	10	11	12	13	14	15	16	17	18	19	20	21	22	Pos	Pts
2011	125cc	Aprilia	QAT; 9	SPA; Ret	POR; 4	FRA; 1	CAT; 2	**GBR**; Ret	**NED**; 1	ITA; 3	**GER**; 3	CZE; 6	INP; 2	RSM; 7	ARA; 3	JPN; 4	AUS; 8	MAL; 1	VAL; 1						3rd	248
2012	Moto3	FTR Honda	QAT; 1	SPA; 6	POR; 2	**FRA**; Ret	**CAT**; 1	**GBR**; 1	NED; 1	GER; 17	**ITA**; 1	INP; Ret	**CZE**; 4	RSM; 5	ARA; DNS	JPN; 2	MAL; WD	AUS; Ret	VAL; 8						3rd	207
2013	Moto3	KTM	QAT; 2	AME; 2	SPA; 1	**FRA**; 1	ITA; 3	CAT; 3	NED; 2	GER; 3	INP; 3	CZE; 2	**GBR**; 4	RSM; 2	ARA; 2	MAL; 5	AUS; 2	JPN; 2	VAL; 1						1st	323
2014	Moto2	Kalex	QAT; 4	AME; 1	ARG; Ret	SPA; 5	FRA; 4	ITA; 9	CAT; 2	NED; 2	GER; 5	INP; 2	CZE; 6	GBR; 3	RSM; 4	**ARA**; 1	JPN; 2	AUS; 1	MAL; 1	VAL; Ret					3rd	274
2015	MotoGP	Suzuki	QAT; 14	AME; 9	ARG; 10	SPA; 11	FRA; 9	ITA; 7	CAT; 6	NED; 10	GER; 11	INP; 11	CZE; Ret	GBR; 11	RSM; 14	ARA; 11	JPN; Ret	AUS; 6	MAL; 8	VAL; 11					12th	97
2016	MotoGP	Suzuki	QAT; 6	ARG; Ret	AME; 4	SPA; 6	FRA; 3	ITA; 6	CAT; 4	NED; 9	GER; 12	AUT; 6	CZE; 9	GBR; 1	RSM; 5	ARA; 4	JPN; 3	AUS; 3	MAL; 6	VAL; 5					4th	202
2017	MotoGP	Yamaha	**QAT**; 1	ARG; 1	AME; Ret	SPA; 6	**FRA**; 1	**ITA**; 2	CAT; 10	NED; Ret	GER; 4	CZE; 3	AUT; 6	GBR; 2	**RSM**; 4	**ARA**; 4	JPN; 9	AUS; 3	MAL; 9	VAL; 12					3rd	230
2018	MotoGP	Yamaha	QAT; 6	ARG; 5	AME; 2	SPA; 7	FRA; 7	ITA; 8	CAT; 6	NED; 3	GER; 3	CZE; Ret	AUT; 12	GBR; C	RSM; 5	ARA; 10	THA; 3	JPN; 7	AUS; 1	MAL; 4	**VAL**; Ret				4th	193
2019	MotoGP	Yamaha	**QAT**; 7	ARG; Ret	AME; 11	SPA; 3	FRA; Ret	ITA; 6	CAT; Ret	NED; 1	GER; 2	CZE; 10	AUT; 5	GBR; 3	**RSM**; 3	ARA; 4	THA; 3	JPN; 4	**AUS**; Ret	MAL; 1	VAL; 6				3rd	211
2020	MotoGP	Yamaha	SPA; 2	ANC; 2	CZE; 14	**AUT**; 10	STY; Ret	**RSM**; 6	**EMI**; 1	CAT; 9	FRA; 10	ARA; 4	TER; 7	EUR; 13	VAL; 10	POR; 11									6th	132
2021	MotoGP	Yamaha	QAT; 1	DOH; 5	POR; 11	SPA; 7	FRA; 10	ITA; 8	CAT; 5	GER; 19	**NED**; 2	STY; NC	AUT	GBR											10th	106
2021	MotoGP	Aprilia													ARA; 18	RSM; 13	AME	EMI; 8	ALR; 16	VAL; 16					10th	106
2022	MotoGP	Aprilia	QAT; 12	INA; 16	ARG; 7	AME; 10	POR; 10	SPA; 14	FRA; 10	ITA; 12	CAT; 7	GER; Ret	NED; 3	GBR; 2	AUT; 13	RSM; 3	ARA; 13	JPN; 7	THA; 7	AUS; 17	MAL; 16	VAL; Ret			11th	122
2023	MotoGP	Aprilia	POR; 2^{5}	ARG; 12^{7}	AME; 4	SPA; Ret^{7}	FRA; Ret^{9}	ITA; 12	GER; Ret	NED; Ret^{7}	GBR; 5^{3}	AUT; 6^{8}	CAT; 2^{3}	RSM; 5^{6}	IND; 8^{8}	JPN; 19^{9}	INA; 2^{4}	AUS; 11	THA; Ret	MAL; 11	QAT; 4^{6}	**VAL**; 10^{4}			7th	204
2024	MotoGP	Aprilia	QAT; 10^{9}	POR; Ret^{1}	**AME**; 1^{1}	SPA; 9	FRA; 5^{3}	CAT; 12^{8}	ITA; 8^{5}	NED; 5^{3}	GER; 12^{7}	GBR; 13^{8}	AUT; 7	ARA; Ret	RSM; 16	EMI; 6	INA; 6^{7}	JPN; Ret^{9}	AUS; 8	THA; 7	MAL; 7	SLD; 15			7th	190
2025	MotoGP	KTM	THA; 16	ARG; 12	AME; 14	QAT; 14	SPA; 4^{7}	FRA; 5^{5}	GBR; 11	ARA; 18^{7}	ITA; Ret^{4}	NED; 5^{6}	GER; DNS	CZE	AUT; DNS	HUN	CAT; 13	RSM; Ret	JPN; 16	INA; DNS	AUS	MAL	POR	VAL; Ret	18th	72
2026	MotoGP	KTM	THA; 16	BRA; 18	USA; DNS	SPA	FRA	CAT; 11	ITA; 17	HUN; 15	CZE; 15	NED; 13	GER; Ret	GBR	ARA	RSM	AUT	JPN; 14	INA; 17	AUS	MAL	QAT	POR	VAL	22nd*	12*

* Season still in progress.

Sporting positions
Preceded by Alberto Moncayo	CEV Buckler 125GP champion 2010	Succeeded by Álex Rins
