= Suzuki MotoGP =

Team of Suzuki in the MotoGP World Championship

- 2022 name: Team Suzuki Ecstar
- Base: Hamamatsu, Japan; Cambiago, Milan, Italy
- Riders' Championships: 5; 1976, 1977 - Barry Sheene; 1993 - Kevin Schwantz; 2000 - Kenny Roberts Jr. 2020 - Joan Mir
- Teams' Championships: 1; 2020

Suzuki MotoGP was the factory-backed team of Japanese motorcycle manufacturer Suzuki in the MotoGP World Championship, most recently using the name Team Suzuki Ecstar for sponsorship purposes. Suzuki withdrew from MotoGP competition at the conclusion of the 2022 season, winning their final race with Álex Rins.

== History ==
=== 1970s ===
In 1971, Grand Prix racer Jack Findlay and his business partner Daniele Fontana constructed a racing motorcycle using a Suzuki T series engine with a chassis of their own design. Findlay rode the motorcycle to victory in the 1971 Ulster Grand Prix marking the first victory for a Suzuki motorcycle in the premier 500cc class, as well as the first-ever 500cc class victory for a motorcycle powered by a two stroke engine.

Suzuki first entered a works team in the 500cc Grand Prix World Championship in 1974 with riders Barry Sheene and Findlay riding the Suzuki RG500. The motorcycle was designed by Makoto Hase using the proven square-four, two stroke engine architecture that Suzuki had developed during their successful Grand Prix racing program in the 1960s. The RG 500 was proven successful in its first race at the 1974 500cc French Grand Prix when, Barry Sheene finished in second place behind the defending world champion, Phil Read. The team's first victory came in 1975, a pole-to-finish win by Barry Sheene at the Dutch TT. Sheene finished the season 6th overall with two wins.

Having developed the RG500, Suzuki ceded direct control of their Grand Prix racing program to their British importer, Suzuki GB in 1976 so that, they could concentrate on developing they first four stroke motorcycle, the Suzuki GS series. Barry Sheene won the riders' championship in 1976 with a total of five wins. Sheene's second 500cc riders' championship came in 1977 with six wins. Teammate Steve Parrish was fifth.

In 1978 with two wins on the new Suzuki RGA, Sheene finished second in the championship behind Yamaha rider Kenny Roberts. Teammate Wil Hartog was fourth overall, also won two races. The 1979 championship was again won by Roberts with Virginio Ferrari finishing second, Barry Sheene third and Wil Hartog fourth, all riding the new Suzuki RGB.

=== 1980s ===
Randy Mamola and Graeme Crosby joined Suzuki in 1980. While Yamaha rider Roberts won his third title, Suzuki riders Mamola was second, and Marco Lucchinelli third. Lucchinelli became the 500cc World Champion in 1981 riding the new Suzuki RG 500 gamma for the Roberto Gallina racing team.

Lucchinelli left Suzuki to join Honda in 1982. He was replaced on the Gallina team by Franco Uncini who went on to win the World Championship with five wins. Uncini was severely injured at the Dutch TT at Assen in 1983 and was unable to defend his title. Suzuki withdrew factory support at the end of the season.

After three years away Suzuki returned in 1987 with factory supported entries. While not a full-time return, riders Takumi Itoh and Kevin Schwantz had some good results aboard the new Suzuki RGV500. Suzuki made a full return to racing in 1988 with Schwantz finishing 8th overall with two wins whilst teammate Rob McElnea finished the season in 10th place. With a total of six wins, Schwantz was ranked fourth for the 1989 season.

=== 1990s ===
In 1990 Schwantz was second overall with five wins while teammate Niall Mackenzie was 4th. Another five wins ranked Schwantz third overall in 1991. Doug Chandler became Schwantz's teammate for 1992 during which Schwantz enjoyed one win to finish the season fourth followed by Chandler's fifth place overall.

Schwantz won his long-awaited first World Championship in 1993 with four race wins. His new teammate Alex Barros also scored a win and finished 6th overall.

In 1994, Schwantz was 4th overall with two wins whilst Barros was 8th. Early in the 1995 season, Schwantz decided to retire from motorcycle competition. The other Suzuki rider Daryl Beattie finished the season second with two race wins.

Scott Russell joined Beattie in 1996. Russell finished the season 6th while Beattie suffered serious injuries pre-season and did not have his previous form. He finished 18th. Beattie was joined by Anthony Gobert in 1997. Beattie finished the season 11th and Gobert 15th. A fifth-place finish by Beattie was the team's best result that season.

Suzuki entered an all Japanese riders lineup in 1998 with Nobuatsu Aoki and Katsuaki Fujiwara. Fujiwara however was injured during pre-season tests and Aoki contested the world championship alone. He finished 9th for the season with a best result of 4th place. New rider Kenny Roberts Jr. joined Aoki in 1999. Roberts Jr. took Suzuki's first win in the four years since 1995. His four wins gave him second place in the championship. Aoki was 13th.

=== 2000s ===
Roberts became World Champion in 2000 with a total of four victories, Aoki was 10th overall.

In 2001 Sete Gibernau joined Roberts riding the Suzuki RGV500. Gibernau finished ninth overall and Roberts 11th.

In 2002, the debut year of the new MotoGP class, Roberts and Gibernau rode the new Suzuki GSV-R four-stroke motorcycle. The team's best result was a 3rd-place podium finish by Roberts at the Brazilian Grand Prix. Overall, Roberts finished 9th and Gibernau 16th.

John Hopkins joined Roberts in 2003. Hopkins came seventh at the Spanish Grand Prix. However, Roberts missed three races due to a crash in the Italian Grand Prix and finished the season 19th two places behind Hopkins in 17th place. The rider line-up remained the same for 2004 while Bridgestone replaced Michelin as the team's tyre supplier. Hopkins finished the season 16th with Roberts Jr. again two places behind in 18th.

Once again the rider line-up remained the same for 2005, while Englishman Paul Denning became the new team manager taking over the position of Garry Taylor. Roberts took a second place podium-finish in the wet British Grand Prix but finished the season 13th. Hopkins finished 14th for the season.

Chris Vermeulen joined Hopkins in 2006. Hopkins finished the season 10th while Vermeulen finished 11th with a 2nd place podium-finish at the 2006 Australian Grand Prix.

Both riders stayed with the team in 2007 and raced the new 800cc Suzuki GSV-R. Vermeulen took Suzuki's first win since the advent of four-stroke regulations and finished the season 6th overall. Hopkins finished 4th with four podium finishes.

For 2008, Chris Vermeulen was joined by Loris Capirossi as the rider lineup and the same lineup remained in 2009.

=== 2010s ===
For the 2010 season Álvaro Bautista joined the team.

For the 2011 season, the team fielded only one GSV-R for Bautista with no replacement for Loris Capirossi, who moved to the Pramac Racing team. At the end of 2011, Suzuki pulled out of MotoGP citing the need to reduce costs amid the global economic downturn.

In June 2013, Suzuki announced that they would return to MotoGP with a factory team in 2015. On 30 September 2014, Suzuki confirmed that it would participate in MotoGP from 2015, with Aleix Espargaró and Maverick Viñales as their two riders. They raced a newly developed MotoGP machine, the GSX-RR, with a restructured team organisation led by Davide Brivio.

=== 2020s ===
In 2020, Suzuki secured the team's title for the first time, while rider Joan Mir secured the rider's title, becoming the first Suzuki rider to do so since Kenny Roberts Jr. in 2000.

On 12 May 2022, Suzuki announced they were "...in discussions with Dorna regarding the possibility of ending its participation in MotoGP at the end of 2022". Suzuki were reported to have contractual obligations to participate until 2026. Suzuki won two of their final three races in Australia and Valencia.

== MotoGP results ==
=== By rider ===
Year	Class	Team name	Bike	Riders	Races	Wins	Podiums	Poles	F. laps	Points	Pos.
2022	MotoGP	Team Suzuki Ecstar	Suzuki GSX-RR	(Spain) Joan Mir	16	0	0	0	0	87	15th
2022	MotoGP	Team Suzuki Ecstar	Suzuki GSX-RR	(Spain) Álex Rins	19	2	4	0	0	173	7th
2022	MotoGP	Team Suzuki Ecstar	Suzuki GSX-RR	(Japan) Kazuki Watanabe	1	0	0	0	0	0	31st
2022	MotoGP	Team Suzuki Ecstar	Suzuki GSX-RR	(Japan) Takuya Tsuda	1	0	0	0	0	0	NC
2022	MotoGP	Team Suzuki Ecstar	Suzuki GSX-RR	(Italy) Danilo Petrucci	1	0	0	0	0	0	NC

=== By year ===
(key)

Year	Team	Motorcycle	Tyres	No.	Riders	1	2	3	4	5	6	7	8	9	10	11	12	13	14	15	16	17	18	Points	RC	Points	TC	Points	MC
2002	Telefónica Movistar Suzuki	Suzuki GSV-R	D M			JPN	SAF	SPA	FRA	ITA	CAT	NED	GBR	GER	CZE	POR	RIO	PAC	MAL	AUS	VAL								
2002	Telefónica Movistar Suzuki	Suzuki GSV-R	D M	15	(Spain) Sete Gibernau	Ret	16	9	12	Ret	Ret	Ret	6	Ret	4	Ret	8	Ret	14	12	13			51	16th	150	4th	143	3rd
2002	Telefónica Movistar Suzuki	Suzuki GSV-R	D M	10	(United States) Kenny Roberts Jr.	Ret	Ret	8	5	Ret	7	6	14		11	4	3	6	8	9	Ret			99	9th	150	4th	143	3rd
2002	Telefónica Movistar Suzuki	Suzuki GSV-R	D M	51	(Japan) Yukio Kagayama									Ret										0	NC	150	4th	143	3rd
2002	Team Suzuki Test	Suzuki GSV-R	D M	33	(Japan) Akira Ryō	2					11	15	13	11	14				11					41	18th	—N/a		143	3rd
2003	Suzuki Grand Prix Team	Suzuki GSV-R	M			JPN	SAF	SPA	FRA	ITA	CAT	NED	GBR	GER	CZE	POR	RIO	PAC	MAL	AUS	VAL								
2003	Suzuki Grand Prix Team	Suzuki GSV-R	M	21	(United States) John Hopkins	13	13	7	Ret	Ret	15	15	11	Ret	17	18	DNS	Ret		12	13			29	17th	55	10th	43	5th
2003	Suzuki Grand Prix Team	Suzuki GSV-R	M	10	(United States) Kenny Roberts Jr.	14	15	13	16	Ret				15	20	17	17	15	14	9	11			22	19th	55	10th	43	5th
2003	Suzuki Grand Prix Team	Suzuki GSV-R	M	71	(Japan) Yukio Kagayama							Ret	12											4	25th	55	10th	43	5th
2003	Suzuki Grand Prix Team	Suzuki GSV-R	M	43	(Japan) Akira Ryō														20					0 (6)	24th	55	10th	43	5th
2003	Team Suzuki Test	Suzuki GSV-R	M	43	(Japan) Akira Ryō													10						6	24th	—N/a		43	5th
2004	Team Suzuki MotoGP	Suzuki GSV-R	B			SAF	SPA	FRA	ITA	CAT	NED	RIO	GER	GBR	CZE	POR	JPN	QAT	MAL	AUS	VAL								
2004	Team Suzuki MotoGP	Suzuki GSV-R	B	21	(United States) John Hopkins	13	15	Ret		Ret	14	15	9	8	Ret	6	Ret	8	Ret	15	12			45	16th	89	9th	73	5th
2004	Team Suzuki MotoGP	Suzuki GSV-R	B	10	(United States) Kenny Roberts Jr.	Ret	8	12	Ret	17	16	7	8	17	10	14	Ret							37	18th	89	9th	73	5th
2004	Team Suzuki MotoGP	Suzuki GSV-R	B	32	(Spain) Gregorio Lavilla															16	17			0	NC	89	9th	73	5th
2004	Team Suzuki MotoGP	Suzuki GSV-R	B	71	(Japan) Yukio Kagayama													11	14					7	23rd	89	9th	73	5th
2004	Team Suzuki Test	Suzuki GSV-R	B	32	(Spain) Gregorio Lavilla					Ret					Ret									0	NC	—N/a		73	5th
2005	Team Suzuki MotoGP Red Bull Suzuki (Rd. 8)	Suzuki GSV-R	B			SPA	POR	CHN	FRA	ITA	CAT	NED	USA	GBR	GER	CZE	JPN	MAL	QAT	AUS	TUR	VAL							
2005	Team Suzuki MotoGP Red Bull Suzuki (Rd. 8)	Suzuki GSV-R	B	21	(United States) John Hopkins	14	Ret	7	16	11	Ret	14	8	11	Ret	14	5	9	17	10	15	13		63	14th	126	8th	100	5th
2005	Team Suzuki MotoGP Red Bull Suzuki (Rd. 8)	Suzuki GSV-R	B	10	(United States) Kenny Roberts Jr.	Ret	12	Ret	13	15	15	16	14	2	11	11	8	7	11					63	13th	126	8th	100	5th
2005	Team Suzuki MotoGP Red Bull Suzuki (Rd. 8)	Suzuki GSV-R	B	9	(Japan) Nobuatsu Aoki											16						Ret		0	NC	126	8th	100	5th
2006	Rizla Suzuki MotoGP	Suzuki GSV-R	B			SPA	QAT	TUR	CHN	FRA	ITA	CAT	NED	GBR	GER	USA	CZE	MAL	AUS	JPN	POR	VAL							
2006	Rizla Suzuki MotoGP	Suzuki GSV-R	B	21	(United States) John Hopkins	9	Ret	17	4	15	10	4	6	8	10	6	7	6	12	12	6	11		116	10th	214	5th	151	4th
2006	Rizla Suzuki MotoGP	Suzuki GSV-R	B	71	(Australia) Chris Vermeulen	12	Ret	7	Ret	10	14	6	10	16	7	5	12	11	2	11	9	Ret		98	11th	214	5th	151	4th
2006	Team Suzuki Test	Suzuki GSV-R	B	64	(Japan) Kousuke Akiyoshi																13			3	21st	—N/a		151	4th
2007	Rizla Suzuki MotoGP	Suzuki GSV-R	B			QAT	SPA	TUR	CHN	FRA	ITA	CAT	GBR	NED	GER	USA	CZE	SMR	POR	JPN	AUS	MAL	VAL						
2007	Rizla Suzuki MotoGP	Suzuki GSV-R	B	21	(United States) John Hopkins	4	19	6	3	7	5	4	5	5	7	15	2	3	6	10	7	8	3	189	4th	368	3rd	241	4th
2007	Rizla Suzuki MotoGP	Suzuki GSV-R	B	71	(Australia) Chris Vermeulen	7	9	11	7	1	8	7	3	16	11	2	5	2	13	11	8	7	6	179	6th	368	3rd	241	4th
2007	Team Suzuki Test	Suzuki GSV-R	B	64	(Japan) Kousuke Akiyoshi		17													Ret				0	NC	—N/a		241	4th
2007	Team Suzuki Test	Suzuki GSV-R	B	9	(Japan) Nobuatsu Aoki																	13		3	25th	—N/a		241	4th
2008	Rizla Suzuki MotoGP	Suzuki GSV-R	B			QAT	SPA	POR	CHN	FRA	ITA	CAT	GBR	NED	GER	USA	CZE	SMR	IND	JPN	AUS	MAL	VAL						
2008	Rizla Suzuki MotoGP	Suzuki GSV-R	B	7	(Australia) Chris Vermeulen	17	10	8	Ret	5	10	7	8	7	3	3	6	5	9	Ret	15	9	13	128	8th	248	5th	181	4th
2008	Rizla Suzuki MotoGP	Suzuki GSV-R	B	65	(Italy) Loris Capirossi	8	5	9	9	7	7	Ret		WD	7	15	3	7	16	6	10	7	9	118	10th	248	5th	181	4th
2008	Rizla Suzuki MotoGP	Suzuki GSV-R	B	11	(United States) Ben Spies								14											2 (20)	19th	248	5th	181	4th
2008	Team Suzuki Test	Suzuki GSV-R	B	11	(United States) Ben Spies											8			6					18 (20)	19th	—N/a		181	4th
2008	Team Suzuki Test	Suzuki GSV-R	B	64	(Japan) Kousuke Akiyoshi															Ret				0	NC	—N/a		181	4th
2008	Team Suzuki Test	Suzuki GSV-R	B	9	(Japan) Nobuatsu Aoki																	17		0	NC	—N/a		181	4th
2009	Rizla Suzuki MotoGP	Suzuki GSV-R	B			QAT	JPN	SPA	FRA	ITA	CAT	NED	USA	GER	GBR	CZE	IND	SMR	POR	AUS	MAL	VAL							
2009	Rizla Suzuki MotoGP	Suzuki GSV-R	B	7	(Australia) Chris Vermeulen	7	10	10	6	10	11	5	8	13	13	11	11	9	10	11	6	15		106	12th	216	6th	133	4th
2009	Rizla Suzuki MotoGP	Suzuki GSV-R	B	65	(Italy) Loris Capirossi	Ret	7	6	8	5	5	9	Ret	11	11	5	7	5	Ret	12	9	14		110	9th	216	6th	133	4th
2010	Rizla Suzuki MotoGP	Suzuki GSV-R	B			QAT	SPA	FRA	ITA	GBR	NED	CAT	GER	USA	CZE	IND	SMR	ARA	JPN	MAL	AUS	POR	VAL						
2010	Rizla Suzuki MotoGP	Suzuki GSV-R	B	19	(Spain) Álvaro Bautista	Ret	10	DNS	14	12	14	5	Ret	Ret	Ret	8	8	8	7	5	12	11	9	85	13th	129	6th	108	6th
2010	Rizla Suzuki MotoGP	Suzuki GSV-R	B	65	(Italy) Loris Capirossi	9	Ret	Ret	10	Ret	13	7	11	10	Ret	11	Ret		Ret	Ret	DNS	13	Ret	44	16th	129	6th	108	6th
2011	Rizla Suzuki MotoGP	Suzuki GSV-R	B			QAT	SPA	POR	FRA	CAT	GBR	NED	ITA	GER	USA	CZE	IND	SMR	ARA	JPN	AUS	MAL	VAL						
2011	Rizla Suzuki MotoGP	Suzuki GSV-R	B	19	(Spain) Álvaro Bautista	DNS		13	12	12	5	11	13	7	Ret	Ret	6	8	6	Ret	Ret	C	Ret	67	13th	73	8th	73	4th
2011	Rizla Suzuki MotoGP	Suzuki GSV-R	B	21	(United States) John Hopkins		10									DNS						C		6	21st	73	8th	73	4th

Year	Team	Motorcycle	Tyres	No.	Riders	1	2	3	4	5	6	7	8	9	10	11	12	13	14	15	16	17	18	19	20	Points	RC	Points	TC	Points	MC
2014	Team Suzuki MotoGP	Suzuki GSX-RR	B			QAT	AME	ARG	SPA	FRA	ITA	CAT	NED	GER	IND	CZE	GBR	SMR	ARA	JPN	AUS	MAL	VAL								
2014	Team Suzuki MotoGP	Suzuki GSX-RR	B	14	(France) Randy de Puniet																		Ret			0	NC	0	NC	0	NC
2015	Team Suzuki Ecstar	Suzuki GSX-RR	B			QAT	AME	ARG	SPA	FRA	ITA	ESP	NED	GER	USA	CZE	GBR	SMR	ARA	JPN	AUS	MAL	VAL								
2015	Team Suzuki Ecstar	Suzuki GSX-RR	B	25	(Spain) Maverick Viñales	14	9	10	11	9	7	6	10	11	11	Ret	11	14	11	Ret	6	8	11			97	12th	202	5th	137	4th
2015	Team Suzuki Ecstar	Suzuki GSX-RR	B	41	(Spain) Aleix Espargaró	11	8	7	7	Ret	Ret	Ret	9	10	14	9	9	10	6	11	9	7	8			105	11th	202	5th	137	4th
2016	Team Suzuki Ecstar	Suzuki GSX-RR	M			QAT	ARG	AME	SPA	FRA	ITA	CAT	NED	GER	AUT	CZE	GBR	RSM	ARA	JPN	AUS	MAL	VAL								
2016	Team Suzuki Ecstar	Suzuki GSX-RR	M	25	(Spain) Maverick Viñales	6	Ret	4	6	3	6	4	9	12	6	9	1	5	4	3	3	6	5			202	4th	295	4th	208	4th
2016	Team Suzuki Ecstar	Suzuki GSX-RR	M	41	(Spain) Aleix Espargaró	11	11	5	5	6	9	Ret	Ret	14	Ret	Ret	7	Ret	7	4	Ret	13	8			93	11th	295	4th	208	4th
2017	Team Suzuki Ecstar	Suzuki GSX-RR	M			QAT	ARG	AME	SPA	FRA	ITA	CAT	NED	GER	CZE	AUT	GBR	RSM	ARA	JPN	AUS	MAL	VAL								
2017	Team Suzuki Ecstar	Suzuki GSX-RR	M	29	(Italy) Andrea Iannone	Ret	16	7	Ret	10	10	16	9	Ret	19	11	Ret	Ret	12	4	6	17	6			70	13th	130	6th	100	4th
2017	Team Suzuki Ecstar	Suzuki GSX-RR	M	42	(Spain) Álex Rins	9	Ret	DNS					17	21	11	16	9	8	17	5	8	DSQ	4			59	16th	130	6th	100	4th
2017	Team Suzuki Ecstar	Suzuki GSX-RR	M	12	(Japan) Takuya Tsuda				17																	0	NC	130	6th	100	4th
2017	Team Suzuki Ecstar	Suzuki GSX-RR	M	50	(France) Sylvain Guintoli					15	17	17														1	27th	130	6th	100	4th
2018	Team Suzuki Ecstar	Suzuki GSX-RR	M			QAT	ARG	AME	SPA	FRA	ITA	CAT	NED	GER	CZE	AUT	GBR	RSM	ARA	THA	JPN	AUS	MAL	VAL							
2018	Team Suzuki Ecstar	Suzuki GSX-RR	M	29	(Italy) Andrea Iannone	9	8	3	3	Ret	4	10	11	12	10	13	C	8	3	11	Ret	2	Ret	Ret		133	10th	302	4th	233	4th
2018	Team Suzuki Ecstar	Suzuki GSX-RR	M	42	(Spain) Álex Rins	Ret	3	Ret	Ret	10	5	Ret	2	Ret	11	8	C	4	4	6	3	5	2	2		169	5th	302	4th	233	4th
2018	Team Suzuki Ecstar	Suzuki GSX-RR	M	50	(France) Sylvain Guintoli							Ret			19						21					0	NC	—N/a		233	4th
2019	Team Suzuki Ecstar	Suzuki GSX-RR	M			QAT	ARG	AME	SPA	FRA	ITA	CAT	NED	GER	CZE	AUT	GBR	RSM	ARA	THA	JPN	AUS	MAL	VAL							
2019	Team Suzuki Ecstar	Suzuki GSX-RR	M	36	(Spain) Joan Mir	8	Ret	17	Ret	16	12	6	8	7	Ret			8	14	7	8	5	10	7		92	12th	301 (304)	5th	234	4th
2019	Team Suzuki Ecstar	Suzuki GSX-RR	M	42	(Spain) Álex Rins	4	5	1	2	10	4	4	Ret	Ret	4	6	1	Ret	9	5	7	9	5	5		205	4th	301 (304)	5th	234	4th
2019	Team Suzuki Ecstar	Suzuki GSX-RR	M	50	(France) Sylvain Guintoli							13			20		12				20					7	25th	301 (304)	5th	234	4th
2020	Team Suzuki Ecstar	Suzuki GSX-RR	M			SPA	ANC	CZE	AUT	STY	RSM	EMI	CAT	FRA	ARA	TER	EUR	VAL	POR												
2020	Team Suzuki Ecstar	Suzuki GSX-RR	M	36	(Spain) Joan Mir	Ret	5	Ret	2	4	3	2	2	11	3	3	1	7	Ret							171	1st	310	1st	202	3rd
2020	Team Suzuki Ecstar	Suzuki GSX-RR	M	42	(Spain) Álex Rins	DNS	10	4	Ret	6	5	12	3	NC	1	2	2	4	15							139	3rd	310	1st	202	3rd
2021	Team Suzuki Ecstar	Suzuki GSX-RR	M			QAT	DOH	POR	SPA	FRA	ITA	CAT	GER	NED	STY	AUT	GBR	ARA	RSM	AME	EMI	ALR	VAL								
2021	Team Suzuki Ecstar	Suzuki GSX-RR	M	36	(Spain) Joan Mir	4	7	3	5	Ret	3	4	9	3	2	4	9	3	6	8	Ret	2	5			208	3rd	307	3rd	240	3rd
2021	Team Suzuki Ecstar	Suzuki GSX-RR	M	42	(Spain) Álex Rins	6	4	Ret	20	Ret	Ret		11	11	7	14	2	11	Ret	4	6	8	Ret			99	13th	307	3rd	240	3rd
2022	Team Suzuki Ecstar	Suzuki GSX-RR	M			QAT	INA	ARG	AME	POR	SPA	FRA	ITA	CAT	GER	NED	GBR	AUT	RSM	ARA	JPN	THA	AUS	MAL	VAL						
2022	Team Suzuki Ecstar	Suzuki GSX-RR	M	9	(Italy) Danilo Petrucci																	20				0	30th	260	6th	199	5th
2022	Team Suzuki Ecstar	Suzuki GSX-RR	M	36	(Spain) Joan Mir	6	6	4	4	Ret	6	Ret	Ret	4	Ret	8	Ret	Ret		DNS			18	19	6	87	15th	260	6th	199	5th
2022	Team Suzuki Ecstar	Suzuki GSX-RR	M	42	(Spain) Álex Rins	7	5	3	2	4	19	Ret	Ret	Ret	DNS	10	7	8	7	9	Ret	12	1	5	1	173	7th	260	6th	199	5th
2022	Team Suzuki Ecstar	Suzuki GSX-RR	M	85	(Japan) Takuya Tsuda																Ret					0	NC	260	6th	199	5th
2022	Team Suzuki Ecstar	Suzuki GSX-RR	M	92	(Japan) Kazuki Watanabe														21							0	31st	260	6th	199	5th
