= Suzuki GSX-RR =

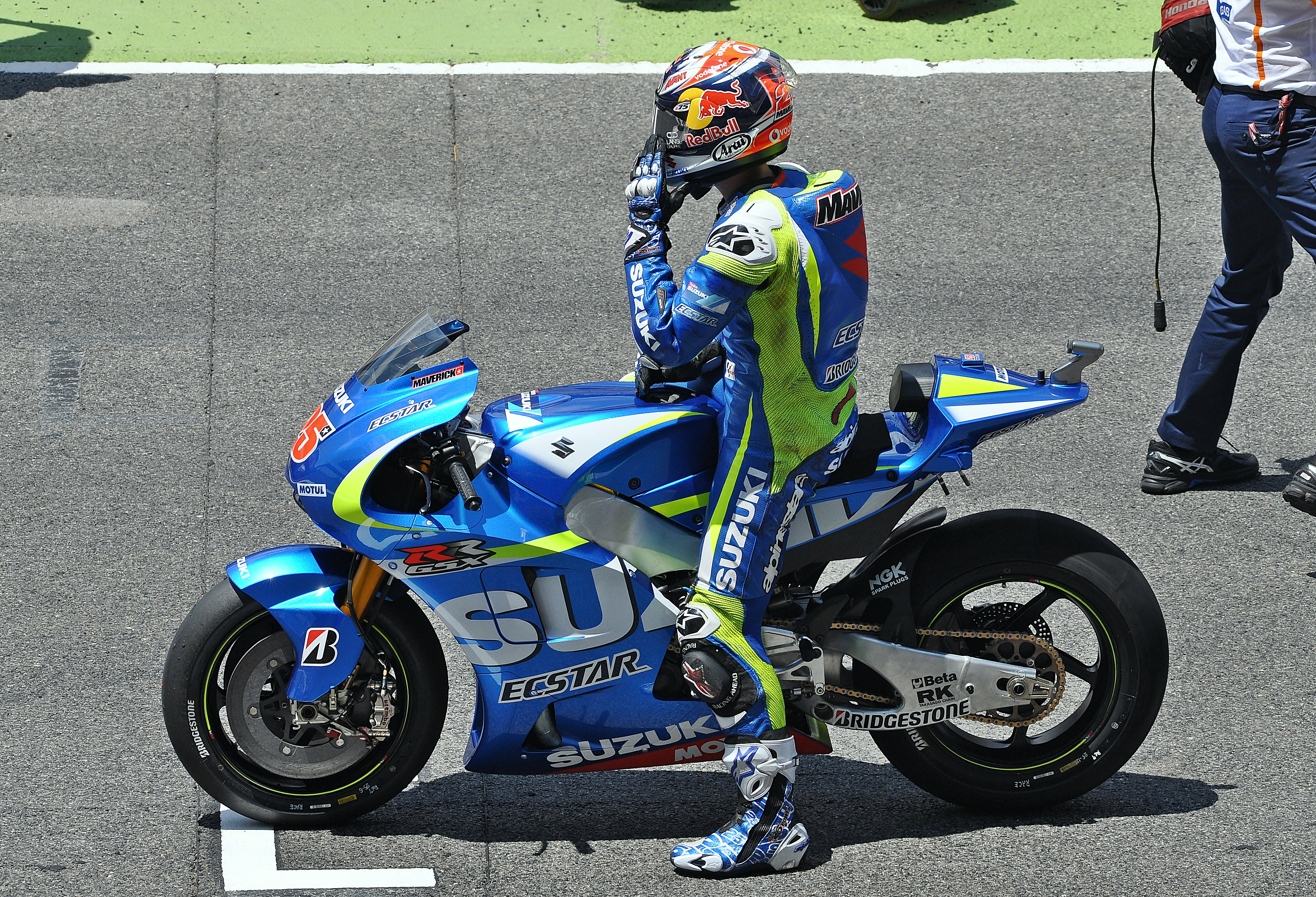
- Maverick Viñales, riding a Suzuki GSX-RR, at the 2015 Catalan Grand Prix.
- Manufacturer: Suzuki
- Production: 2014–2022
- Predecessor: Suzuki GSV-R
- Class: MotoGP prototype
- Engine: 998.8 cc (61 cu in) four-stroke I4
- Transmission: 6-speed cassette type
- Frame type: Aluminium twin-spar
- Wheelbase: 1,457 mm (57.4 in)
- Dimensions: L: 2,096 mm (82.5 in); W: 720 mm (28.3 in); H: 1,140 mm (44.9 in)
- Weight: 157 kg (dry)
- Fuel capacity: 22 litres

The Suzuki GSX-RR was a road racing motorcycle developed to race in the 1,000 cc (61 cu in) MotoGP series. Officially introduced on 30 September 2014 as the GSV-R replacement, it was developed by Suzuki since 2012.

== History ==
=== Early development (2012–2013) ===
Suzuki suspended its MotoGP activities at the end of 2011 season, citing the global economic crisis, but since 2012 a prototype was spotted testing in several occasions. Initially the prototype was dubbed GSV-R by the media, like its predecessor.

In 2013 it started to take part in official tests, with Randy de Puniet and Nobuatsu Aoki as development and test riders. The machine was now internally codenamed XRH-1.

=== First race (2014) ===
It began officially racing at the last event of the 2014 season, the Valencian Grand Prix at Circuit Ricardo Tormo, Valencia, Spain, ridden by Randy de Puniet as a wild-card entry, who failed to complete more than half of the race.

=== 2015 season ===
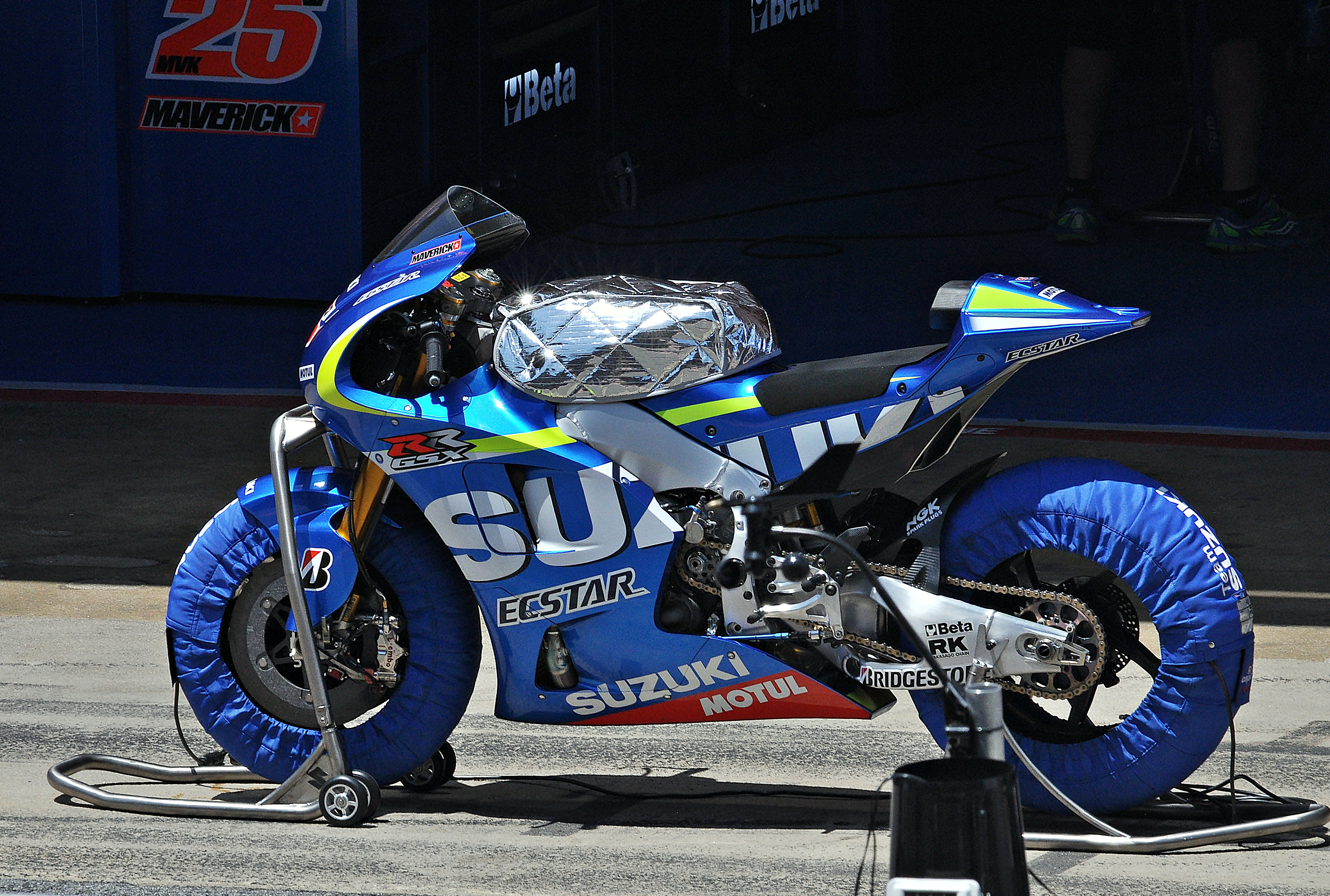
The GSX-RR of Maverick Viñales at the 2015 Catalan Grand Prix

On September 30, 2014, at the Intermot fair, Suzuki officially announced to return in the Premier class in 2015, with Aleix Espargaró and Maverick Viñales as regular riders. Also, the prototype was publicly named GSX-RR.

On March 6, 2015, prior to the beginning of the 2015 season, Suzuki unveiled its MotoGP team name as Team SUZUKI ECSTAR.

At the 2015 Indianapolis Grand Prix, the GSX-RR received a new exhaust from Akrapovič.

=== 2016 season ===
On February 26, Suzuki debuted the 2016-spec GSX-RR. The new model has an improved engine, with an increase in power by 7 kW (9.4 hp), and adopts the standard Magneti Marelli ECU while the dimensions remained unchanged from the previous version. The team also had sponsorship from PT Suzuki Indomobil Motor, through their Satria F150 and Nyalakan Nyali brands.

During the off-season 3-day test in Qatar the factory team evaluated for the first time the full seamless gearbox, which until then was a major technical lack compared to the other manufacturers. Maverick Viñales and Aleix Espargaró stayed for another season with the team

In the 12th round of the season at Silverstone, Viñales started from 3rd and broke away from Valentino Rossi, Marc Márquez and Cal Crutchlow and established a lead while the others battled. Viñales took his first victory in MotoGP and the first since Moto2 Malaysia 2014. This race marked Suzuki's first victory since the 2007 French Grand Prix.

== Specifications ==
| | 2014 | 2015 | 2016 | 2017 | 2018 | 2019 | 2020 |
| Overall length | 2,096 mm (82.5 in) | | | | | | |
| Overall width | 720 mm (28.3 in) | | | | | | |
| Overall height | 1,140 mm (44.9 in) | | | | | | |
| Wheelbase | 1,457 mm (57.4 in) | | | | | | |
| Weight | Over 160 kg (353 lb) | | Over 157 kg (346 lb) | | | | |
| Engine Type | Water-cooled, Four-stroke, DOHC 16-valve, Crossplane crankshaft, Inline-four engine | | | | | | |
| Displacement | 999 cc (61 cu in) | | | | | 998.8 cc (61 cu in) | |
| Max Power | Over 230 PS (227 hp; 169 kW) | | Over 240 PS (237 hp; 177 kW) | | | | |
| Top Speed | Over 330 kilometres per hour (205 mph) | | | | | Over 354 kilometres per hour (220 mph) | |
| Fuel Capacity | 24 L (5.3 imp gal; 6.3 US gal) | | 22 L (4.8 imp gal; 5.8 US gal) | | | | |
| Frame Type | Aluminum Twin Spar | | | | | | |
| Suspension | Front: Inverted telescopic fork (Öhlins); Rear: Link type (Öhlins) | | | | | | |
| Brakes | Front: Double carbon disk/steel disk (Brembo); Rear: Single steel disk (Brembo) | | | | | | |
| Wheels | Front: 16.5 inch Rear: 16.5 inch | | Front: 17 inch Rear: 17 inch | | | | |
| Tyres | Bridgestone | | Michelin | | | | |

== Complete MotoGP results ==
=== Motorcycle summary ===
- World Championship titles: 2

Riders: 1 (Joan Mir: 2020)
Teams: 1 (Team Suzuki Ecstar: 2020)

- Races won: 7

2016: Viñales 1 (1 in total)
2019: Rins 2 (2 in total)
2020: Rins 1, Mir 1 (2 in total)
2022: Rins 2 (2 in total)

- Podiums: 38

2016: Viñales 4 (4 in total)
2018: Iannone 4, Rins 5 (9 in total)
2019: Rins 3 (3 in total)
2020: Mir 7, Rins 4 (11 in total)
2021: Mir 6, Rins 1 (7 in total)
2022: Rins 4 (4 in total)

- Poles: 1

2015: A. Espargaró 1 (1 in total)

=== GSX-RR results ===
(key) (results in bold indicate pole position; results in italics indicate fastest lap)

| Year | Tyres | Team | No. | Rider | 1 | 2 | 3 | 4 | 5 | 6 | 7 | 8 | 9 | 10 | 11 | 12 | 13 | 14 | 15 | 16 | 17 | 18 | 19 | 20 | Points | RC | Points | TC | Points | MC |
|---|---|---|---|---|---|---|---|---|---|---|---|---|---|---|---|---|---|---|---|---|---|---|---|---|---|---|---|---|---|---|
| 2014 | B | | | | QAT | AME | ARG | ESP | FRA | ITA | CAT | NED | GER | IND | CZE | GBR | RSM | ARA | JPN | AUS | MAL | VAL | | | | | | | | |
| 2014 | B | (Japan) Team Suzuki MotoGP | 14 | (France) Randy de Puniet | | | | | | | | | | | | | | | | | | Ret | | | 0 | NC | 0 | NC | 0 | NC |
| 2015 | B | | | | QAT | AME | ARG | ESP | FRA | ITA | CAT | NED | GER | IND | CZE | GBR | RSM | ARA | JPN | AUS | MAL | VAL | | | | | | | | |
| 2015 | B | (Japan) Team SUZUKI ECSTAR | 25 | (Spain) Maverick Viñales | 14 | 9 | 10 | 11 | 9 | 7 | 6 | 10 | 11 | 11 | Ret | 11 | 14 | 11 | Ret | 6 | 8 | 11 | | | 97 | 12th | 202 | 5th | 137 | 4th |
| 2015 | B | (Japan) Team SUZUKI ECSTAR | 41 | (Spain) Aleix Espargaró | 11 | 8 | 7 | 7 | Ret | Ret | **Ret** | 9 | 10 | 14 | 9 | 9 | 10 | 6 | 11 | 9 | 7 | 8 | | | 105 | 11th | 202 | 5th | 137 | 4th |
| 2016 | MI | | | | QAT | ARG | AME | ESP | FRA | ITA | CAT | NED | GER | AUS | CZE | GBR | RSM | ARA | JPN | AUS | MAL | VAL | | | | | | | | |
| 2016 | MI | (Japan) Team SUZUKI ECSTAR | 25 | (Spain) Maverick Viñales | 6 | Ret | 4 | 6 | 3 | 6 | 4 | 9 | 12 | 6 | 9 | 1 | 5 | 4 | 3 | 3 | 6 | 5 | | | 202 | 4th | 295 | 4th | 208 | 4th |
| 2016 | MI | (Japan) Team SUZUKI ECSTAR | 41 | (Spain) Aleix Espargaró | 11 | 11 | 5 | 5 | 6 | 9 | Ret | Ret | 14 | Ret | Ret | 7 | Ret | 7 | 4 | Ret | 13 | 8 | | | 93 | 11th | 295 | 4th | 208 | 4th |
| 2017 | MI | | | | QAT | ARG | AME | ESP | FRA | ITA | CAT | NED | GER | CZE | AUS | GBR | RSM | ARA | JPN | AUS | MAL | VAL | | | | | | | | |
| 2017 | MI | (Japan) Team SUZUKI ECSTAR | 12 | (Japan) Takuya Tsuda | | | | 17 | | | | | | | | | | | | | | | | | 0 | NC | 130 | 6th | 100 | 4th |
| 2017 | MI | (Japan) Team SUZUKI ECSTAR | 29 | (Italy) Andrea Iannone | Ret | 16 | 7 | Ret | 10 | 10 | 16 | 9 | Ret | 19 | 11 | Ret | Ret | 12 | 4 | 6 | 17 | 6 | | | 70 | 13th | 130 | 6th | 100 | 4th |
| 2017 | MI | (Japan) Team SUZUKI ECSTAR | 42 | (Spain) Álex Rins | 9 | Ret | DNS | | | | | 17 | 21 | 11 | 16 | 9 | 8 | 17 | 5 | 8 | DSQ | 4 | | | 59 | 16th | 130 | 6th | 100 | 4th |
| 2017 | MI | (Japan) Team SUZUKI ECSTAR | 50 | (France) Sylvain Guintoli | | | | | 15 | 17 | 17 | | | | | | | | | | | | | | 1 | 27th | 130 | 6th | 100 | 4th |
| 2018 | MI | | | | QAT | ARG | AME | ESP | FRA | ITA | CAT | NED | GER | CZE | AUS | GBR | RSM | ARA | THA | JPN | AUS | MAL | VAL | | | | | | | |
| 2018 | MI | (Japan) Team SUZUKI ECSTAR | 29 | (Italy) Andrea Iannone | 9 | 8 | 3 | 3 | Ret | 4 | 10 | 11 | 12 | 10 | 13 | C | 8 | 3 | 11 | Ret | 2 | Ret | Ret | | 133 | 10th | 302 | 4th | 233 | 4th |
| 2018 | MI | (Japan) Team SUZUKI ECSTAR | 42 | (Spain) Álex Rins | Ret | 3 | Ret | Ret | 10 | 5 | Ret | 2 | Ret | 11 | 8 | C | 4 | 4 | 6 | 3 | 5 | 2 | 2 | | 169 | 5th | 302 | 4th | 233 | 4th |
| 2018 | MI | (Japan) Team SUZUKI ECSTAR | 50 | (France) Sylvain Guintoli | | | | | | | Ret | | | 19 | | | | | | 21 | | | | | 0 | NC | 302 | 4th | 233 | 4th |
| 2019 | MI | | | | QAT | ARG | AME | ESP | FRA | ITA | CAT | NED | GER | CZE | AUS | GBR | RSM | ARA | THA | JPN | AUS | MAL | VAL | | | | | | | |
| 2019 | MI | (Japan) Team SUZUKI ECSTAR | 36 | (Spain) Joan Mir | 8 | Ret | 17 | Ret | 16 | 12 | 6 | 8 | 7 | Ret | | | 8 | 14 | 7 | 8 | 5 | 10 | 7 | | 92 | 12th | 301 (304) | 5th | 234 | 4th |
| 2019 | MI | (Japan) Team SUZUKI ECSTAR | 42 | (Spain) Álex Rins | 4 | 5 | 1 | 2 | 10 | 4 | 4 | Ret | Ret | 4 | 6 | 1 | Ret | 9 | 5 | 7 | 9 | 5 | 5 | | 205 | 4th | 301 (304) | 5th | 234 | 4th |
| 2019 | MI | (Japan) Team SUZUKI ECSTAR | 50 | (France) Sylvain Guintoli | | | | | | | 13 | | | 20 | | 12 | | | | 20 | | | | | 7 | 25th | 301 (304) | 5th | 234 | 4th |
| 2020 | MI | | | | SPA | ANC | CZE | AUT | STY | RSM | EMI | CAT | FRA | ARA | TER | EUR | VAL | POR | | | | | | | | | | | | |
| 2020 | MI | (Japan) Team SUZUKI ECSTAR | 36 | (Spain) Joan Mir | Ret | 5 | Ret | 2 | 4 | 3 | 2 | 2 | 11 | 3 | 3 | 1 | 7 | Ret | | | | | | | 171 | 1st | 310 | 1st | 202 | 3rd |
| 2020 | MI | (Japan) Team SUZUKI ECSTAR | 42 | (Spain) Álex Rins | DNS | 10 | 4 | Ret | 6 | 5 | 12 | 3 | NC | 1 | 2 | 2 | 4 | 15 | | | | | | | 139 | 3rd | 310 | 1st | 202 | 3rd |
| 2021 | MI | | | | QAT | DOH | POR | SPA | FRA | ITA | CAT | GER | NED | STY | AUT | GBR | ARA | RSM | AME | MAL | ALR | VAL | | | | | | | | |
| 2021 | MI | (Japan) Team SUZUKI ECSTAR | 36 | (Spain) Joan Mir | 4 | 7 | 3 | 5 | Ret | 3 | 4 | 9 | 3 | 2 | 4 | 9 | 3 | 6 | 8 | Ret | 2 | 4 | | | 208 | 3rd | 307 | 3rd | 240 | 3rd |
| 2021 | MI | (Japan) Team SUZUKI ECSTAR | 42 | (Spain) Álex Rins | 6 | 4 | Ret | 20 | Ret | Ret | | 11 | 11 | 7 | 14 | 2 | 12 | Ret | 4 | 6 | 8 | Ret | | | 99 | 13th | 307 | 3rd | 240 | 3rd |
| 2022 | MI | | | | QAT | INA | ARG | AME | POR | SPA | FRA | ITA | CAT | GER | NED | GBR | AUT | RSM | ARA | JPN | THA | AUS | MAL | VAL | | | | | | |
| 2022 | MI | (Japan) Team SUZUKI ECSTAR | | | | | | | | | | | | | | | | | | | | | | | | | | | | |
| 2022 | MI | (Japan) Team SUZUKI ECSTAR | 9 | (Italy) Danilo Petrucci | | | | | | | | | | | | | | | | | 20 | | | | 0 | 30th | 260 | 6th | 199 | 5th |
| 2022 | MI | (Japan) Team SUZUKI ECSTAR | 36 | (Spain) Joan Mir | 6 | 6 | 4 | 4 | Ret | 6 | Ret | Ret | 4 | Ret | 8 | Ret | Ret | | DNS | | | 18 | 19 | 6 | 87 | 15th | 260 | 6th | 199 | 5th |
| 2022 | MI | (Japan) Team SUZUKI ECSTAR | 42 | (Spain) Álex Rins | 7 | 5 | 3 | 2 | 4 | 19 | Ret | Ret | Ret | DNS | 10 | 7 | 8 | 7 | 9 | Ret | 12 | 1 | 5 | 1 | 173 | 7th | 260 | 6th | 199 | 5th |
| 2022 | MI | (Japan) Team SUZUKI ECSTAR | 85 | (Japan) Takuya Tsuda | | | | | | | | | | | | | | | | Ret | | | | | 0 | NC | 260 | 6th | 199 | 5th |
| 2022 | MI | (Japan) Team SUZUKI ECSTAR | 92 | (Japan) Kazuki Watanabe | | | | | | | | | | | | | | | 21 | | | | | | 0 | 31st | 260 | 6th | 199 | 5th |

== See also ==
- KTM RC16
- Aprilia RS-GP
- Honda RC213V
- Yamaha YZR-M1
- Ducati Desmosedici
