= Nobuatsu Aoki =

Japanese motorcycle racer

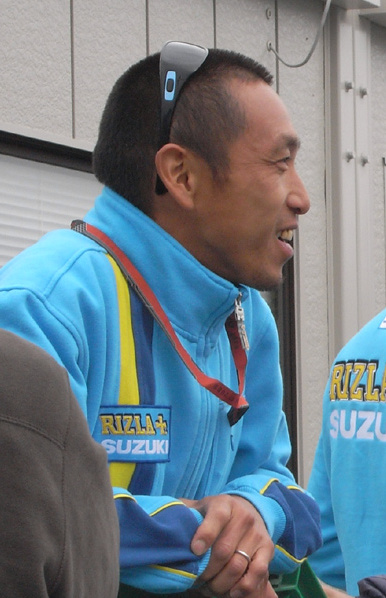
- Aoki at the 2009 Japanese Grand Prix
- Nationality: Japanese
Motorcycle racing career statistics
Grand Prix motorcycle racing
| Active years | 1990 - 2008 |
| First race | 1990 250cc Japanese Grand Prix |
| Last race | 2008 MotoGP Malaysian Grand Prix |
| First win | 1993 250cc Malaysian Grand Prix |
| Last win | 1993 250cc Malaysian Grand Prix |
| Team(s) | Honda, Suzuki, Proton |
Starts / Wins / Podiums / Poles / F. laps / Points; 167 / 1 / 7 / 1 / 1 / 1005

Nobuatsu Aoki (青木 宣篤, Aoki Nobuatsu; born August 31, 1971 in Sumaga) is a former Grand Prix motorcycle road racer. Aoki began his Grand Prix career in 1990 and won his first and only Grand Prix at the 250cc Malaysian Grand Prix. His best season was in 1997, when he finished third in the 500cc world championship behind Mick Doohan and Tadayuki Okada. In 2009, he teamed with Daisaku Sakai and Kazuki Tokudome on a Suzuki GSX-R1000 to win the Suzuka 8 Hours endurance race. He is the oldest of three Aoki brothers who have competed in motorcycle Grand Prix races.

== Grand Prix career results ==
Points system from 1988 to 1992:

| **Position** | 1 | 2 | 3 | 4 | 5 | 6 | 7 | 8 | 9 | 10 | 11 | 12 | 13 | 14 | 15 |
| **Points** | 20 | 17 | 15 | 13 | 11 | 10 | 9 | 8 | 7 | 6 | 5 | 4 | 3 | 2 | 1 |

Points system from 1993 onwards:

| **Position** | 1 | 2 | 3 | 4 | 5 | 6 | 7 | 8 | 9 | 10 | 11 | 12 | 13 | 14 | 15 |
| **Points** | 25 | 20 | 16 | 13 | 11 | 10 | 9 | 8 | 7 | 6 | 5 | 4 | 3 | 2 | 1 |

(key) (Races in bold indicate pole position, races in italics indicate fastest lap)

| Year | Class | Team | Machine | 1 | 2 | 3 | 4 | 5 | 6 | 7 | 8 | 9 | 10 | 11 | 12 | 13 | 14 | 15 | 16 | 17 | 18 | Points | Rank | Wins |
|---|---|---|---|---|---|---|---|---|---|---|---|---|---|---|---|---|---|---|---|---|---|---|---|---|
| 1990 | 250cc | Cup Noodle-Honda | NSR250 | JPN; 8 | USA - | ESP - | NAT - | GER - | AUT - | YUG - | NED - | BEL - | FRA - | GBR - | SWE - | CZE - | HUN - | AUS - | | | | 8 | 29th | 0 |
| 1991 | 250cc | Cup Noodle-Honda | NSR250 | JPN; 5 | AUS - | USA - | ESP - | ITA - | GER - | AUT - | EUR - | NED - | FRA - | GBR - | RSM - | CZE - | VDM - | MAL - | | | | 11 | 23rd | 0 |
| 1992 | 250cc | Cup Noodle-Honda | NSR250 | **JPN**; 3 | AUS - | MAL - | ESP - | ITA - | EUR - | GER - | NED - | HUN - | FRA - | GBR - | BRA - | RSA - | | | | | | 12 | 14th | 0 |
| 1993 | 250cc | Kanemoto-Honda | NSR250 | AUS; 5 | MAL; 1 | JPN; 4 | ESP; Ret | AUT; Ret | GER; DNS | NED; 10 | EUR; 4 | RSM; 9 | GBR; Ret | CZE; 10 | ITA; 6 | USA; 7 | FIM; Ret | | | | | 100 | 11th | 1 |
| 1994 | 250cc | Blumex Rheos-Honda | NSR250 | AUS; 6 | MAL; Ret | JPN; 8 | ESP; 5 | AUT; Ret | GER; 4 | NED; 5 | ITA; Inj | FRA; 6 | GBR; 8 | CZE; 4 | USA; 5 | ARG; 21 | EUR; Ret | | | | | 95 | 10th | 0 |
| 1995 | 250cc | Blumex Rheos-Honda | NSR250 | AUS; 5 | MAL; 7 | JPN; 2 | ESP; 8 | GER; 8 | ITA; 7 | NED; 7 | FRA; Ret | GBR; 10 | CZE; 9 | BRA; 8 | ARG; Ret | EUR; 6 | | | | | | 105 | 6th | 0 |
| 1996 | 250cc | Blumex Rheos-Honda | NSR250 | MAL; 6 | INA; 5 | JPN; 6 | ESP; Ret | ITA; 8 | FRA; 5 | NED; 7 | GER; 11 | GBR; 8 | AUT; 6 | CZE; 11 | IMO; Ret | CAT; 7 | BRA; Ret | AUS; 7 | | | | 105 | 7th | 0 |
| 1997 | 500cc | Rheos Elf-Honda | NSR500 | MAL; 3 | JPN; 5 | ESP; 5 | ITA; 3 | AUT; 4 | FRA; Ret | NED; 4 | IMO; 2 | GER; 4 | BRA; 4 | GBR; 4 | CZE; 3 | CAT; 5 | INA; 4 | AUS; Ret | | | | **179** | **3rd** | **0** |
| 1998 | 500cc | Suzuki Grand Prix | RGV500 | JPN; 6 | MAL; Ret | ESP; 8 | ITA; 8 | FRA; 8 | MAD; 4 | NED; 7 | GBR; 7 | GER; 10 | CZE; 12 | IMO; 9 | CAT; 11 | AUS; 6 | ARG; 12 | | | | | 101 | 9th | 0 |
| 1999 | 500cc | Suzuki Grand Prix | RGV500 | MAL; 9 | JPN; 10 | ESP; Ret | FRA; Inj | ITA; Inj | CAT; 11 | NED; 4 | GBR; Ret | GER; Ret | CZE; 6 | IMO; 7 | VAL; 12 | AUS; 8 | RSA; 7 | BRA; 9 | ARG; Ret | | | 78 | 13th | 0 |
| 2000 | 500cc | Suzuki Grand Prix | RGV500 | RSA; 8 | MAL; 5 | JPN; 4 | ESP; 7 | FRA; 11 | ITA; 4 | CAT; 4 | NED; 13 | GBR; 16 | GER; 13 | CZE; 8 | POR; Ret | VAL; 4 | BRA; 12 | PAC; 9 | AUS; 10 | | | 116 | 10th | 0 |
| 2002 | MotoGP | Proton-Team KR | Proton KR3 | JPN; 7 | RSA; Ret | ESP; 7 | FRA; 6 | ITA; Ret | CAT; Ret | NED; Ret | GBR; 9 | GER; 8 | CZE; Ret | POR; Ret | BRA; 12 | PAC; 9 | MAL; Ret | AUS; 7 | VAL; Ret | | | 63 | 12th | 0 |
| 2003 | MotoGP | Proton-Team KR | Proton KR3 | JPN; Ret | RSA; 12 | ESP; 9 | FRA; Ret | | | | | | | | | | | | | | | 19 | 21st | 0 |
| 2003 | MotoGP | Proton-Team KR | Proton KR5 | | | | | ITA; Ret | CAT; 16 | NED; Ret | GBR; 15 | GER; 11 | CZE; Ret | POR; 20 | BRA; Ret | PAC; 14 | MAL; 18 | AUS; 18 | VAL; 17 | | | 19 | 21st | 0 |
| 2004 | MotoGP | Proton-Team KR | Proton KR5 | RSA; 17 | ESP; 14 | FRA; 17 | ITA; 13 | CAT; 15 | NED; Ret | BRA; 18 | GER; Ret | GBR; 18 | CZE; 15 | POR; 15 | JPN; 14 | QAT; Ret | MAL; 17 | AUS; 19 | VAL; 18 | | | 10 | 21st | 0 |
| 2005 | MotoGP | Suzuki MotoGP | GSV-R | ESP - | POR - | CHN - | FRA - | ITA - | CAT - | NED - | USA - | GBR - | GER - | CZE; 16 | JPN - | MAL - | QAT - | AUS - | TUR - | VAL; Ret | | 0 | - | 0 |
| 2007 | MotoGP | Suzuki MotoGP | GSV-R | QAT - | ESP - | TUR - | CHN - | FRA - | ITA - | CAT - | GBR - | NED - | GER - | USA - | CZE - | RSM - | POR - | JPN - | AUS - | MAL; 13 | VAL - | 3 | 25th | 0 |
| 2008 | MotoGP | Suzuki MotoGP | GSV-R | QAT - | ESP - | POR - | CHN - | FRA - | ITA - | CAT - | GBR - | NED - | GER - | USA - | CZE - | RSM - | INP - | JPN - | AUS - | MAL; 17 | VAL - | 0 | - | 0 |

=== Suzuka 8 Hours results ===
| Year | Team | Co-Rider | Bike | Pos |
|---|---|---|---|---|
| 2009 | (Japan) Yoshimura Suzuki with JOMO | (Japan) Daisaku Sakai (Japan) Kazuki Tokudome (Japan) Nobuatsu Aoki | S-GSX-R1000 | 1st |
