= Chris Vermeulen =

Australian motorcycle racer

- Vermeulen in 2006
- Nationality: Australian
- Born: 19 June 1982 (age 44); Brisbane, Queensland, Australia
- Website: chrisvermeulen.com
Motorcycle racing career statistics
MotoGP World Championship
Active years	2005–2009, 2012
Manufacturers	Honda, Suzuki, Suter
Championships	0
2012 championship position	NC (0 pts)
Starts / Wins / Podiums / Poles / F. laps / Points; 73 / 1 / 7 / 3 / 1 / 521
Superbike World Championship
Active years	2004–2005, 2010–2011
Manufacturers	Honda, Kawasaki
Championships	0
2011 championship position	20th (14 pts)
Starts / Wins / Podiums / Poles / F. laps / Points; 66 / 10 / 23 / 3 / 7 / 661
Supersport World Championship
Active years	2000–2003
Manufacturers	Honda
Championships	1 (2003)
2003 championship position	1st (201 pts)
Starts / Wins / Podiums / Poles / F. laps / Points; 37 / 4 / 10 / 5 / 3 / 334

Christopher Vermeulen (born 19 June 1982) is an Australian retired motorcycle racer. He competed in the Supersport World Championship and the Superbike World Championship before racing in the premier MotoGP class between 2005 and 2009, most prominently as a member of the Suzuki MotoGP team, winning the 2007 French Grand Prix.

Vermeulen won the World Supersport Championship for the Ten Kate Honda team in 2003. He then raced in the Superbike class in 2004 and 2005 for the Ten Kate Honda team, finishing as series runner-up in 2005. From 2006, he joined the elite MotoGP series, for the Rizla Suzuki MotoGP Team. During his career, Vermeulen was regarded as a wet-weather expert and is affectionately nicknamed 'Vermin' on account of his last name.

== Career ==
=== Early career ===
Vermeulen was born in Brisbane, Australia on June 19, 1982. In 1999, he raced in the Australian Superbike Championship, despite only having participated in a handful of professional races beforehand. He took his Yamaha to eighth in the championship, with a best result of fourth, and the privateer championship for non-factory riders. His mentor Barry Sheene then arranged rides for him in Britain in their Supersport and Superstock classes, and success in these gave him his World Supersport break with Castrol Honda.

Initial success in a few late-2000 races did not translate into a successful 2001, as Vermeulen only managed a single top-five finish. However in 2002, he linked up with Dutch team owner Gerrit Ten Kate, taking his first poles and podiums en route to seventh in the championship in the 2002 season. He became the team's lead rider for 2003, and became series champion comfortably with four victories, becoming the youngest ever winner.

=== Superbike World Championship ===
When Ten Kate arranged a deal to run a Honda Fireblade in World Superbikes for 2004, Vermeulen was the natural choice to ride it. The team did their own development on the bike (in its first test they still used a road-bike clutch), but he still won four races and briefly led the championship before finishing fourth, as the only non-Ducati in the top-eight.

For 2005, the championship had many Yamaha and Suzuki bikes, as well as four more Hondas, including a second Ten Kate entry for Karl Muggeridge. Vermeulen continued to record victories, and took his first pole at Assen in the Netherlands, the country in which his grandfather was born. Victory in the first race at Imola took him to within 55 points of veteran compatriot Troy Corser's lead, but the cancellation of the second race due to heavy rain meant that only 50 points were still available from the remaining round's two races. He still comfortably finished as series runner-up.

=== MotoGP World Championship ===
Vermeulen rode factory bikes for Honda in the Suzuka 8 Hours race and, because of sponsorship and manufacturer relationships (Japan Tobacco and Honda, as the Ten Kate Honda team was sponsored by Winston a Japan Tobacco brand), also rode a Camel Pons Honda GP bike at the tail end of the 2005 season.

Vermeulen's progress towards a factory Honda ride seemed assured but Honda were only offering him another year in World Superbike, and Japan Tobacco had switched to Yamaha in MotoGP, so he made the bold decision to quit HRC and go with team Suzuki who signed him in 2006 alongside fellow youngster John Hopkins.

==== 2006 ====
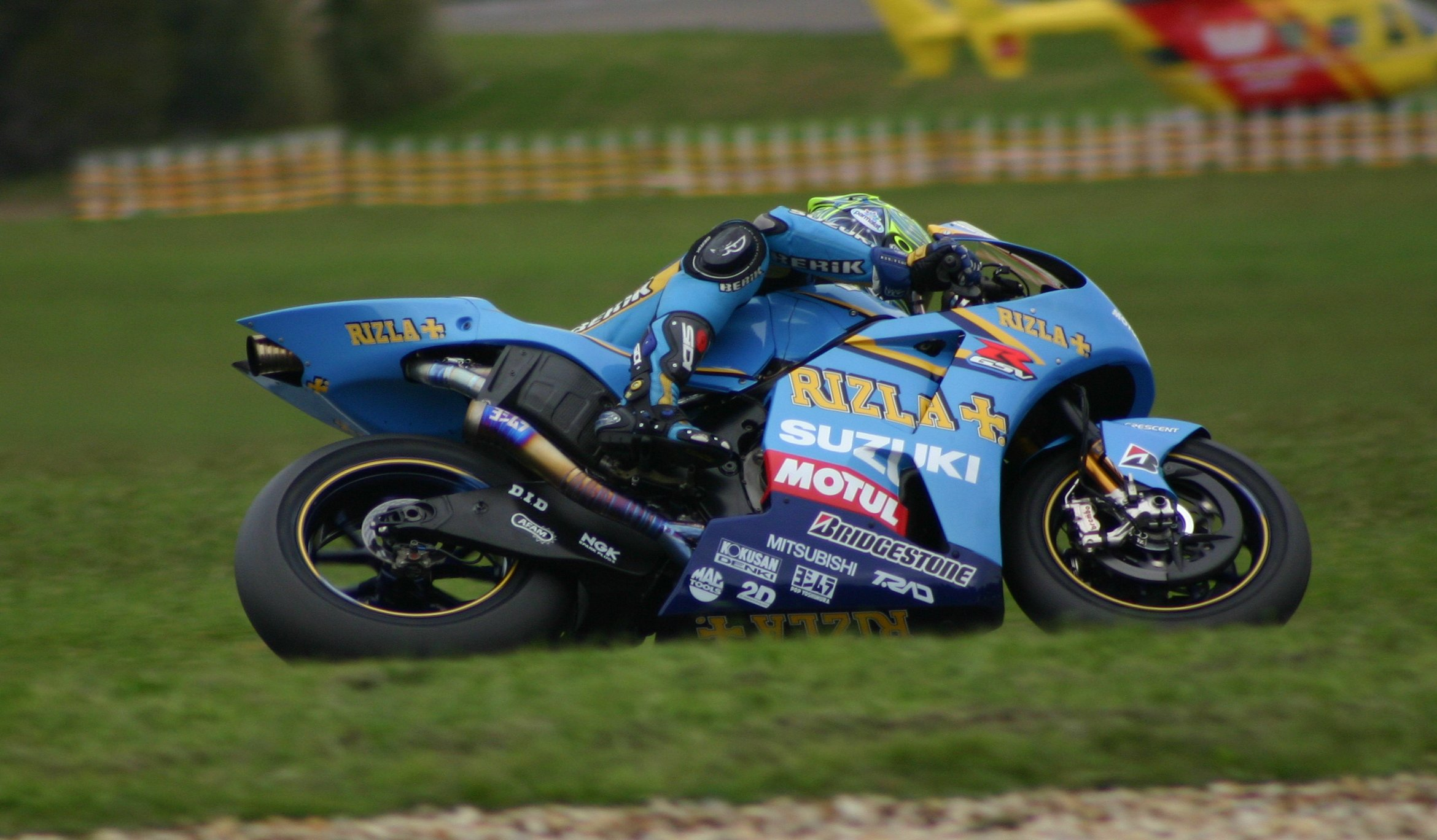
Vermeulen on Suzuki GSV-R at the 2006 Australian Grand Prix

Vermeulen scored his first MotoGP pole in Turkey after a stunning ride in the wet, coincidentally one round after fellow Australian rookie Casey Stoner scored his maiden pole. After the Sachsenring race he was 14th in the championship on 46 points, four places and eighteen points behind Hopkins. At the following round at Laguna Seca, Vermeulen took pole position, one of only two non-Americans in the first two rows of the grid. Vermeulen was one of the few riders to have experience of the circuit, due to it being a former circuit of World Superbikes, and was holding its first Grand Prix race since 1993. He had a technical problem while running third. In his home race at Philip Island, he was the fastest man once the field had changed to wet tyres, and charged through the field to finish 2nd.

==== 2007 ====
The 2007 season saw the introduction of the 800cc GP bikes. Vermeulen made the transition well, achieving a modestly competitive start to his 2007 campaign, with two seventh places, a ninth and an 11th place in the first four GPs of the season, consistently racking up points which saw him place inside the top-ten riders for the season. His season came alive on 20 May 2007 at the Bugatti Circuit Le Mans, where, in a wet race, Vermuelen rode from 12th on the grid to take his maiden victory in MotoGP. He followed the victory up with an impressive third place at the British GP, again from 12th on the grid in the wet behind winner and fellow countryman Casey Stoner, and pole position in the wet at Assen. He shone in the dry by starting third and finishing second at the US GP (Mazda Raceway Laguna Seca), again behind Stoner. At this meeting, he was confirmed as a Suzuki rider for 2008.

==== 2008 ====
Suzuki struggled to compete in the 2008 MotoGP Championship, with neither Vermeulen or teammate Loris Capirossi able to secure a race victory. Vermeulen did however secure back-to-back podiums in the German Grand Prix and US Grand Prix before finishing the season in eighth place in the rider's standings.

==== 2009 ====
Although Vermeulen finished every race in 2009, he took just one top-five finish and was generally outpaced by Capirossi. After another difficult season, Vermeulen was told by Suzuki that he would not be offered a new contract for 2010. Álvaro Bautista took his place in the team.

=== Return to Superbike ===
After failing to secure a contract to remain in MotoGP for the 2010 Championship, Vermeulen sought a return to the Superbike World Championship.

On 6 October 2009, it was confirmed that Vermeulen had signed a contract with the Kawasaki Superbike Team for the 2010 Superbike World Championship season, replacing Makoto Tamada. Vermeulen injured his knee in a crash at the season-opening round at Phillip Island, forcing him to miss the next two races. He continued to struggle throughout the season, and reinjured the knee in a first-lap pile-up at Brno. Following medical advice, he then chose to sit out the remainder of the season in order to regain full fitness.

== Personal life ==
In 2011, Vermeulen married his longtime girlfriend, the English model turned photographer Toni Pinion, they have two daughters, Georgia and Matilda. All his racing numbers have the digit "7" as a tribute to his mentor Barry Sheene. He has a penchant for collecting old American Hot Rod cars and has a few in his collection. Currently, Vermeulen works as an analyst and commentator for MotoGP on Fox Sports Australia.

== Career statistics ==
=== Superstock European Championship ===
==== Races by year ====
(key) (Races in bold indicate pole position) (Races in italics indicate fastest lap)

Year	Bike	1	2	3	4	5	6	7	8	9	Pos	Pts
2000	Honda	DON; 1	MNZ	HOC	SMR	VAL	BRA; WD	OSC	NED	BRA2	19th	25

=== Superbike World Championship ===
==== Races by year ====
(key) (Races in bold indicate pole position, races in italics indicate fastest lap)

Year	Bike	1		2		3		4		5		6		7		8		9		10		11		12		13		Pos	Pts	Ref
Year	Bike	R1	R2	R1	R2	R1	R2	R1	R2	R1	R2	R1	R2	R1	R2	R1	R2	R1	R2	R1	R2	R1	R2	R1	R2	R1	R2	Pos	Pts	Ref
2004	Honda	SPA; 12	SPA; 5	AUS; 2	AUS; 2	SMR; 5	SMR; 12	ITA; 4	ITA; DSQ	GER; 15	GER; 8	GBR; 2	GBR; 1	USA; 1	USA; 1	EUR; 4	EUR; 3	NED; 5	NED; 1	ITA; 2	ITA; 6	FRA; Ret	FRA; Ret					4th	282	
2005	Honda	QAT; 8	QAT; 4	AUS; 3	AUS; 4	SPA; 2	SPA; 2	ITA; Ret	ITA; 1	EUR; 4	EUR; 4	SMR; 2	SMR; 2	CZE; 8	CZE; 3	GBR; 4	GBR; 3	**NED**; 1	**NED**; 1	GER; 1	GER; 2	**ITA**; 1	**ITA**; C	**FRA**; 1	**FRA**; Ret			**2nd**	**379**	
2010	Kawasaki	AUS; Ret	AUS; Ret	POR; DNS	POR; DNS	SPA	SPA	NED; 17	NED; 14	ITA; 18	ITA; 13	RSA; 18	RSA; 16	USA; 15	USA; 13	SMR; 16	SMR; 15	CZE; Ret	CZE; Ret	GBR	GBR	GER	GER	ITA	ITA	FRA	FRA	20th	10	
2011	Kawasaki	AUS	AUS	GBR; DNS	GBR; DNS	NED; Ret	NED; DNS	ITA; DNS	ITA; DNS	USA	USA	SMR; 14	SMR; 10	SPA; 12	SPA; 14	CZE; 18	CZE; DNS	GBR	GBR	GER	GER	ITA	ITA	FRA	FRA	POR	POR	20th	14	

=== Grand Prix motorcycle racing ===
==== By season ====
Season	Class	Motorcycle	Team	Number	Race	Win	Podium	Pole	FLap	Pts	Plcd	WCh
2005	MotoGP	Honda RC211V	Camel Honda	17	2	0	0	0	0	10	21st	–
2006	MotoGP	Suzuki GSV-R	Rizla Suzuki MotoGP	71	17	0	1	2	0	98	11th	–
2007	MotoGP	Suzuki GSV-R	Rizla Suzuki MotoGP	71	18	1	4	1	1	179	6th	–
2008	MotoGP	Suzuki GSV-R	Rizla Suzuki MotoGP	7	18	0	2	0	0	128	8th	–
2009	MotoGP	Suzuki GSV-R	Rizla Suzuki MotoGP	7	17	0	0	0	0	106	12th	–
2012	MotoGP	Suter MMX1	Forward Racing	7	1	0	0	0	0	0	NC	–
Total					**73**	**1**	**7**	**3**	**1**	**521**		**0**

==== By class ====
Class	Seasons	1st GP	1st Pod	1st Win	Race	Win	Podiums	Pole	FLap	Pts	WChmp
MotoGP	2005–2009, 2012	2005 Australia	2006 Australia	2007 France	73	1	7	3	1	521	0
Total	2005–2009, 2012				**73**	**1**	**7**	**3**	**1**	**521**	**0**

==== Races by year ====
(key) (Races in bold indicate pole position, races in italics indicate fastest lap)

Year	Class	Bike	1	2	3	4	5	6	7	8	9	10	11	12	13	14	15	16	17	18	Pos	Pts
2005	MotoGP	Honda	SPA	POR	CHN	FRA	ITA	CAT	NED	USA	GBR	GER	CZE	JPN	MAL	QAT	AUS; 11	TUR; 11	VAL		21st	10
2006	MotoGP	Suzuki	SPA; 12	QAT; Ret	**TUR**; 7	CHN; Ret	FRA; 10	ITA; 14	CAT; 6	NED; 10	GBR; 16	GER; 7	**USA**; 5	CZE; 12	MAL; 11	AUS; 2	JPN; 11	POR; 9	VAL; Ret		11th	98
2007	MotoGP	Suzuki	QAT; 7	SPA; 9	TUR; 11	CHN; 7	FRA; 1	ITA; 8	CAT; 7	GBR; 3	**NED**; 16	GER; 11	USA; 2	CZE; 5	SMR; 2	POR; 13	JPN; 11	AUS; 8	MAL; 7	VAL; 6	6th	179
2008	MotoGP	Suzuki	QAT; 17	SPA; 10	POR; 8	CHN; Ret	FRA; 5	ITA; 10	CAT; 7	GBR; 8	NED; 7	GER; 3	USA; 3	CZE; 6	SMR; 5	INP; 9	JPN; Ret	AUS; 15	MAL; 9	VAL; 13	8th	128
2009	MotoGP	Suzuki	QAT; 7	JPN; 10	SPA; 10	FRA; 6	ITA; 10	CAT; 11	NED; 5	USA; 8	GER; 13	GBR; 13	CZE; 11	INP; 11	SMR; 9	POR; 10	AUS; 11	MAL; 6	VAL; 15		12th	106
2012	MotoGP	Suter	QAT	SPA	POR	FRA; 17	CAT	GBR	NED	GER	ITA	USA	INP	CZE	RSM	ARA	JPN	MAL	AUS	VAL	NC	0
