= Suzuki GSV-R =

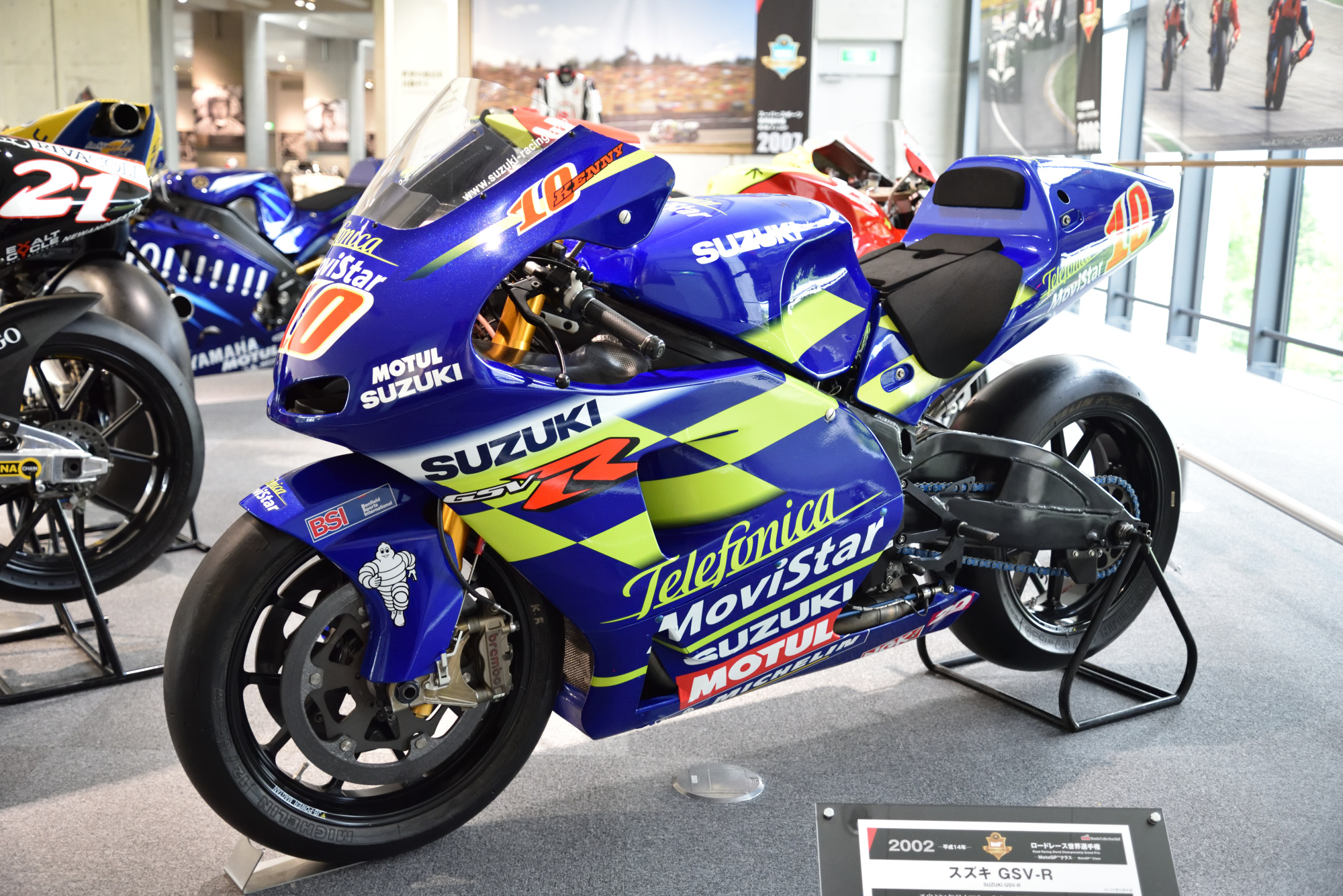
- 2002 Suzuki GSV-R
- Manufacturer: Suzuki
- Also called: Suzuki GSV-R800 (2007–2011)
- Production: 2002–2011
- Predecessor: Suzuki RGV500
- Successor: Suzuki GSX-RR
- Class: MotoGP prototype

The Suzuki GSV-R is the name of the series of four-stroke V4 prototype motorcycles developed by Suzuki to compete in the MotoGP World Championship. The GSV-R replaced Suzuki's 500 cc two-stroke V4 RGV500 which was ridden by Kenny Roberts Jr. to win the 500cc World Championship in 2000.

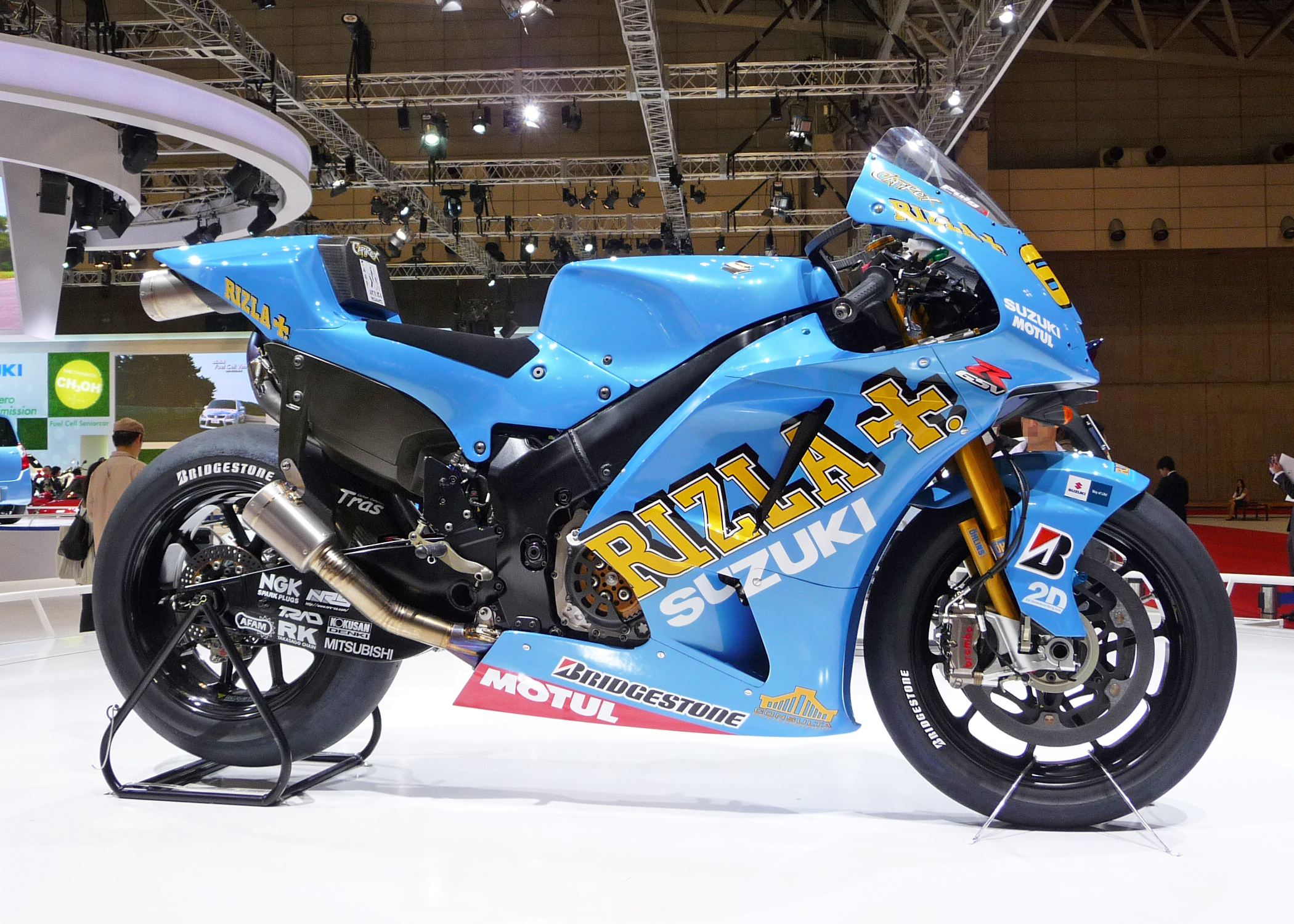
2009 Suzuki GSV-R

== History ==
The first-generation GSV-R, the XRE0, was introduced in 2002 (Suzuki originally planned to wait until the following year), with regulations for that season designed for 990cc four-stroke engines in mind. Despite the use of a new, larger, engine, the XRE0 continued to use the old RGV500 Gamma chassis (including tires and fairings), which led to stability issues throughout the year. Despite all of that, XRE0 was able to taste its first podium (a second place) on the opening round at Suzuka and managed to get a third place at Rio in the same year. The XRE0 achievements however were inconsistent, as the riders often fell down, crashed, or were forced to retire by technical failures. The top XRE0 rider by the end of the 2002 MotoGP Championship was Kenny Roberts Jr. in ninth place overall. For 2003's XRE1, several changes were made, including a switch from a 60° engine to a 65° one.

For 2007, MotoGP rules were changed to allow a maximum displacement of 800 cc. Suzuki introduced an 800 cc version of the GSV-R also known as GSV-R800. The GSV-R800 was codenamed XRG0 because of its newly redesigned engine based on displacement limitations. The new XRG0 engine was based from the layout of the 2006 990 cc GSV-R however, the XRG0 engines bore, stroke, and cylinder pitch had been redesigned to better suit the 800 cc engine displacement. The factory Rizla Suzuki MotoGP team stated the new engines aim was to ‘achieve the best possible horsepower and reliable high rpm operation, and to provide the riders with user friendly power delivery and predictable engine character.’ The XRG0 was also equipped with a redesigned engine control unit supplied by Mitsubishi, capable of producing 220 horsepower at 17,500 rpm. The chassis layout and wheelbase length from the 2006 GSV-R XRE4 used in the 2006 MotoGP season remained on the new model, however the fairing design had been updated to better accommodate high speed stability.

The 2008 MotoGP season brought another redesigned GSV-R800 that Suzuki codenamed XRG1 as the successor to the XRG0 of the previous year. This second generation 800 cc four-stroke prototype was the most complex and technically advanced racing motorcycle Suzuki had ever produced at its time. The XRG1 had been developed closely with team riders Chris Vermeulen and Loris Capirossi and the feedback from the MotoGP team and Suzuki test engineers. A key focus area in refining the XRG1 was improving acceleration. This was accomplished by refining every detail of the 2007 XRG0 engine and an updated Mitsubishi ECU. The resulted engine redesigning provided lower fuel consumption and increased usability. Further refinements of the XRG0 chassis for the 2008 XRG1 allowed for better cornering performance and change of direction. Along with the chassis refinements, a newly designed fairing was developed to reduce wind resistance to enhance handling characteristics.

At the end of 2011 Suzuki pulled out of MotoGP until at least 2014, citing the need to reduce costs amid the global economic downturn. Upon their return in 2014, the GSV-R designation was replaced with the Suzuki GSX-RR.

== Specifications ==
	GSV-R XRE0 (2002)	GSV-R XRE1 (2003)	GSV-R XRE2 (2004)	GSV-R XRE3 (2005)	GSV-R XRE4 (2006)	GSV-R XRG0 (2007)	GSV-R XRG1 (2008)	GSV-R XRG2 (2009)
Engine type	60° 4-stroke V4	65° 4-stroke water-cooled V4				60° 4-stroke water-cooled V4		
Displacement	990 cc (60 cu in)					800 cc (49 cu in)		
Max power	225 hp (168 kW)	225 hp (168 kW)	225 hp (168 kW)	225 hp (168 kW)	225 hp (168 kW)	225 hp (168 kW)	225 hp (168 kW)	225 hp (168 kW)
Valve control and type	DOHC four-valve					Pneumatic (air control), DOHC four-valve		
Carburation type	Fuel injection							
Lubrication system	Wet sump							Wet sump (MOTUL Lubricants)
Clutch	Dry multi plates (back torque reduce type)							
Transmission	Six-speed constant mesh manual					Six-speed low-friction constant mesh manual		
Final drive	Chain							
Frame type	Twin spar aluminum alloy frame							
Suspension	Front: inverted type telescopic Rear: Link type					Front: inverted type telescopic (Öhlins); Rear: link type (Öhlins)		
Tyres	Dunlop/Michelin	Michelin	Bridgestone					
Wheels	Front: 16.5 inches Rear: 16.5 inches	Front: 17 inches Rear: 16.5 inches	Front: 16.5 inches Rear: 16.5 inches					
Brake system	Front: double carbon disc Rear: single disc steel or carbon					Front: double carbon disc (Brembo); Rear: single steel disc (Brembo)		
Overall length	2,030 mm (80 in)		2,060 mm (81 in)				2,080 mm (82 in)	
Overall width			660 mm (26 in)					
Overall height	1,150 mm (45 in)		1,150 mm (45 in)					
Wheelbase	1,420 mm (56 in)		1,450 mm (57 in)					
Weight	330 lb (150 kg)			330 lb (150 kg)		330 lb (150 kg)	330 lb (150 kg)	330 lb (150 kg)
Fuel tank	24 L (5.3 imp gal; 6.3 US gal)			22 L (4.8 imp gal; 5.8 US gal)		21 L (4.6 imp gal; 5.5 US gal)		

== See also ==
- Honda RC212V
- Yamaha YZR-M1
- Aprilia RS Cube
- Ducati Desmosedici
- Kawasaki Ninja ZX-RR
