= 2008 United States motorcycle Grand Prix =

Coordinates: 36°35′3.4″N 121°45′11.8″W

2008 United States Grand Prix
Race details
- Race 11 of 18 races in the 2008 Grand Prix motorcycle racing season
- Date: July 20, 2008
- Official name: Red Bull U.S. Grand Prix
- Location: Mazda Raceway Laguna Seca
- Course: Permanent racing facility; 3.610 km (2.243 mi)

MotoGP
Pole position
- Rider: (Australia) Casey Stoner
- Time: 1:20.700
Fastest lap
- Rider: (Australia) Casey Stoner
- Time: 1:21.488
Podium
- First: (Italy) Valentino Rossi
- Second: (Australia) Casey Stoner
- Third: (Australia) Chris Vermeulen

The 2008 United States motorcycle Grand Prix was the eleventh round of the 2008 MotoGP championship. It took place on the weekend of July 18–20, 2008, at the Mazda Raceway Laguna Seca. It was an eventful race between Valentino Rossi and Casey Stoner where the lead was hotly contested between the two. On lap 23, with Rossi leading after a controversial pass down the corkscrew, Stoner entered into the last corner too deep and ended up in the gravel trap. Rossi retained his lead for the remainder of the race while Stoner managed to finish in second place despite his mistake. Rossi won for the first time at Laguna Seca and Stoner set a new lap record with a time of 1:21.488.

As usual, only the MotoGP class was permitted to race at Laguna Seca due to the Californian air pollution law prohibiting two-stroke engines in the state.

== MotoGP classification ==
Pos.	No.	Rider	Team	Manufacturer	Laps	Time/Retired	Grid	Points
1	46	(Italy) Valentino Rossi	Fiat Yamaha Team	Yamaha	32	44:04.311	2	25
2	1	(Australia) Casey Stoner	Ducati Team	Ducati	32	+13.001	1	20
3	7	(Australia) Chris Vermeulen	Rizla Suzuki MotoGP	Suzuki	32	+26.609	8	16
4	4	(Italy) Andrea Dovizioso	JiR Team Scot MotoGP	Honda	32	+34.901	9	13
5	69	(United States) Nicky Hayden	Repsol Honda Team	Honda	32	+35.663	3	11
6	14	(France) Randy de Puniet	LCR Honda MotoGP	Honda	32	+37.668	6	10
7	24	(Spain) Toni Elías	Alice Team	Ducati	32	+41.629	10	9
8	11	(United States) Ben Spies	Rizla Suzuki MotoGP	Suzuki	32	+41.927	13	8
9	52	(United Kingdom) James Toseland	Tech 3 Yamaha	Yamaha	32	+43.019	5	7
10	56	(Japan) Shinya Nakano	San Carlo Honda Gresini	Honda	32	+44.391	12	6
11	12	(United States) Jamie Hacking	Kawasaki Racing Team	Kawasaki	32	+46.258	17	5
12	50	(France) Sylvain Guintoli	Alice Team	Ducati	32	+55.273	14	4
13	15	(San Marino) Alex de Angelis	San Carlo Honda Gresini	Honda	32	+55.521	16	3
14	5	(United States) Colin Edwards	Tech 3 Yamaha	Yamaha	32	+1:02.380	7	2
15	65	(Italy) Loris Capirossi	Rizla Suzuki MotoGP	Suzuki	32	+1:08.207	11	1
16	33	(Italy) Marco Melandri	Ducati Team	Ducati	32	+1:10.962	15	
17	13	(Australia) Anthony West	Kawasaki Racing Team	Kawasaki	31	+1 lap	18	
Ret	48	(Spain) Jorge Lorenzo	Fiat Yamaha Team	Yamaha	0	Accident	4	
WD	2	(Spain) Dani Pedrosa	Repsol Honda Team	Honda		Withdrew		

== Championship standings after the race (MotoGP) ==
Below are the standings for the top five riders and constructors after round eleven has concluded.

Riders' Championship standings

Pos.	Rider	Points
1	(Italy) Valentino Rossi	212
2	(Australia) Casey Stoner	187
3	(Spain) Dani Pedrosa	171
4	(Spain) Jorge Lorenzo	114
5	(Italy) Andrea Dovizioso	103

Constructors' Championship standings

Pos.	Constructor	Points
1	(Japan) Yamaha	241
2	(Japan) Honda	197
3	(Italy) Ducati	192
4	(Japan) Suzuki	112
5	(Japan) Kawasaki	52

- Note: Only the top five positions are included for both sets of standings.

Previous race: 2008 German Grand Prix	FIM Grand Prix World Championship; 2008 season	Next race: 2008 Czech Republic Grand Prix
Previous race: 2007 United States Grand Prix	United States motorcycle Grand Prix	Next race: 2009 United States Grand Prix
