= MotoGP Rookie of the Year =

Rookie Award in MotoGP

The Rookie of the Year Award has been given to the newcomer in the premier class – MotoGP (current top division of the Grand Prix motorcycle racing is known as MotoGP since 2002 when the four-stroke era began) who collects the most World Championship points during his first season of competition. Prior to that, the largest class was 500cc.

== MotoGP Rookie of the Year winners ==
The following list compiling all the winners of the Rookie of the Year Award in the premier class - MotoGP from 2002 season to the present day.

Season	No.	Rider	Rider standings	Wins	Team	Bike	Tyres
2002	74	(Japan) Daijiro Kato	7		Gresini Racing	Honda NSR500 (1–9); Honda RC211V (10–16)	M
2003	69	(United States) Nicky Hayden	5		Repsol Honda	Honda RC211V	M
2004	11	(Spain) Rubén Xaus	11		Pramac Racing	Ducati Desmosedici GP3	M
2005	24	(Spain) Toni Elías	12		Tech3	Yamaha YZR-M1	M
2006	26	(Spain) Dani Pedrosa	5	2	Repsol Honda	Honda RC211V	M
2007	50	(France) Sylvain Guintoli*	16		Tech3	Yamaha YZR-M1	D
2008	48	(Spain) Jorge Lorenzo	4	1	Yamaha Motor Racing	Yamaha YZR-M1	M
2009	36	(Finland) Mika Kallio	15		Pramac Racing 1–10, 14–17; Ducati Corse 11–13	Ducati Desmosedici GP9	B
2010	11	(United States) Ben Spies	6		Tech3	Yamaha YZR-M1	B
2011	35	(United Kingdom) Cal Crutchlow	12		Tech3	Yamaha YZR-M1	B
2012	6	(Germany) Stefan Bradl	8		LCR Team	Honda RC213V	B
2013	93	(Spain) Marc Márquez	Champion	6	Repsol Honda	Honda RC213V	B
2014	44	(Spain) Pol Espargaró	6		Tech3	Yamaha YZR-M1	B
2015	25	(Spain) Maverick Viñales	12		Suzuki MotoGP	Suzuki GSX-RR	B
2016	53	(Spain) Tito Rabat*	21		Marc VDS Racing Team	Honda RC213V	M
2017	5	(France) Johann Zarco	6		Tech3	Yamaha YZR-M1	M
2018	21	(Italy) Franco Morbidelli	15		Marc VDS Racing Team	Honda RC213V	M
2019	20	(France) Fabio Quartararo	5		Sepang Racing Team	Yamaha YZR-M1	M
2020	33	(South Africa) Brad Binder	11	1	KTM Factory Racing	KTM RC16	M
2021	89	(Spain) Jorge Martín	9	1	Pramac Racing	Ducati Desmosedici GP21	M
2022	72	(Italy) Marco Bezzecchi	14		VR46 Racing Team	Ducati Desmosedici GP21	M
2023	37	(Spain) Augusto Fernández*	17		Tech3	KTM RC16	M
2024	31	(Spain) Pedro Acosta*	6		Tech3	KTM RC16	M
2025	54	(Spain) Fermín Aldeguer	8	1	Gresini Racing	Ducati Desmosedici GP24	M
2026	11	(Brazil) Diogo Moreira	15*		LCR Team	Honda RC213V	M

- Sylvain Guintoli who finished 16th overall in 2007, Tito Rabat who finished 21st in 2016, Augusto Fernández who finished 17th in 2023, and Pedro Acosta who finished 6th in 2024 were the only rookies in the MotoGP grid that year.

== Moto2 Rookie of the Year winners ==
The following list compiling all the winners of the Rookie of the Year Award in Moto2 class from 2011 to the present day.

Season	No.	Rider	Rider standings	Wins	Team	Bike	Tyres
2011	93	(Spain) Marc Márquez	Second	7	Emilio Alzamora Racing	Suter MMXI Honda CBR600RR	D
2012	5	(France) Johann Zarco	10		Japan Italy Racing	Motobi TSR6 Honda CBR600RR	D
2013	81	(Spain) Jordi Torres	10	1	Aspar Team	Suter MMX2 Honda CBR600RR	D
2014	40	(Spain) Maverick Viñales	Third	4	Pons Racing	Kalex Moto2 Honda CBR600RR	D
2015	40	(Spain) Álex Rins	Second	2	Pons Racing	Kalex Moto2 Honda CBR600RR	D
2016	97	(Spain) Xavi Vierge	20		Tech3	Tech3 Mistral 610 Honda CBR600RR	D
2017	42	(Italy) Francesco Bagnaia	5		VR46 Racing Team	Kalex Moto2 Honda CBR600RR	D
2018	36	(Spain) Joan Mir	6		Marc VDS Racing Team	Kalex Moto2 Honda CBR600RR	D
2019	21	(Italy) Fabio Di Giannantonio	9		Speed Up Racing	Speed Up SF19T Triumph 765cc	D
2020	44	(Spain) Arón Canet	14		Aspar Team	Speed Up SF20T Triumph 765cc	D
2021	25	(Spain) Raúl Fernández	Second	8	Ajo Motorsport	Kalex Moto2 Triumph 765cc	D
2022	51	(Spain) Pedro Acosta	5	3	Ajo Motorsport	Kalex Moto2 Triumph 765cc	D
2023	11	(Spain) Sergio García	15		Pons Racing	Kalex Moto2 Triumph 765cc	D
2024	10	(Brazil) Diogo Moreira	13		Italtrans Racing Team	Kalex Moto2 Triumph 765cc	P
2025	27	(Spain) Daniel Holgado	6	2	Aspar Team	Kalex Moto2 Triumph 765cc	P
2026	98	(Spain) José Antonio Rueda	16*		Ajo Motorsport	Kalex Moto2 Triumph 765cc	P

== Moto3 Rookie of the Year winners ==
The following list compiling all the winners of the Rookie of the Year Award in Moto3 class from 2012 season to the present day.

Season	No.	Rider	Rider standings	Wins	Team	Bike	Tyres
2012	42	(Spain) Álex Rins	5		Emilio Alzamora Racing	Suter MMX3 Honda NSF250RW	D
2013	65	(Germany) Philipp Öttl	18		Paddock Grand Prix	Kalex KTM RC250GP	D
2014	33	(Italy) Enea Bastianini	9		Gresini Racing	KTM RC250GP	D
2015	09	(Spain) Jorge Navarro	7		Emilio Alzamora Racing	Honda NSF250RW	D
2016	36	(Spain) Joan Mir	5	1	Leopard Racing	KTM RC250GP	D
2017	71	(Japan) Ayumu Sasaki	20		Sepang Racing Team	Honda NSF250RW	D
2018	5	(Spain) Jaume Masiá	13		Bester Capital Dubai	KTM RC250GP	D
2019	13	(Italy) Celestino Vietti	6		VR46 Racing Team	KTM RC250GP	D
2020	52	(Spain) Jeremy Alcoba	11		Gresini Racing	Honda NSF250RW	D
2021	37	(Spain) Pedro Acosta	Champion	6	Ajo Motorsport	KTM RC250GP	D
2022	10	(Brazil) Diogo Moreira	8		MT Helmets - MSi	KTM RC250GP	D
2023	80	(Colombia) David Alonso	Third	4	Aspar Team	GasGas RC250GP	D
2024	36	(Spain) Ángel Piqueras	8	1	Leopard Racing	Honda NSF250RW	P
2025	28	(Spain) Máximo Quiles	Third	3	Aspar Team	KTM RC250GP	P
2026	51	(Spain) Brian Uriarte	4*	2*	Ajo Motorsport	KTM RC250GP	P

== 500cc Rookie of the Year riders ==
The following list compiling the rookie riders in the 500cc class who collects the most World Championship points during their first season of competition from 1976 to the 2001 season.

Season	No.	Rider	Rider standings	Wins	Team	Bike	Tyres
1976		(United States) Pat Hennen	Third	1	Colemans Racing	Suzuki RG 500	
1977	32	(United States) Steve Baker	Second		Yamaha International	Yamaha YZR500	D
1978	80	(United States) Kenny Roberts	Champion	4	Yamaha USA	Yamaha YZR500	G
1979		(Italy) Franco Uncini	5		Franco Uncini Racing	Zago Suzuki RG 500	M
1980		(New Zealand) Graeme Crosby	8		Suzuki GB	Heron Suzuki RG 500	
1981		(France) Marc Fontan	9		Sonauto	Sonauto Yamaha YZR500	
1982	40	(United States) Freddie Spencer	Third	2	Honda Racing	Honda NS500	M
1983	27	(United States) Eddie Lawson	4		Yamaha Motor Racing	Yamaha YZR500	D
1984		(Australia) Wayne Gardner	7		Honda Britain Racing	Honda NS500	D
1985		(France) Pierre-Étienne Samin	12		Honda Benelux	Honda RS500	M
1986		(Italy) Pierfrancesco Chili	10		Roberto Gallina Racing	Suzuki RG 500	M
1987	18	(United Kingdom) Kenny Irons	14		Heron Suzuki GB	Suzuki RGV500	M
1988	14	(France) Patrick Igoa	14		Sonauto	Yamaha YZR500	M
1989	27	(Australia) Mick Doohan	9		Honda Racing	Honda NSR500	M
1990	14	(France) Jean-Philippe Ruggia	8		Sonauto	Yamaha YZR500	D
1991	19	(United States) John Kocinski	4	1	Team Roberts	Yamaha YZR500	D
1992	28	(Spain) Àlex Crivillé	8	1	Pons Racing	Honda NSR500	M
1993	7	(Italy) Luca Cadalora	5	2	Team Roberts	Yamaha YZR500	D
1994	17	(Spain) Alberto Puig	5		Pons Racing	Honda NSR500	M
1995	65	(Italy) Loris Capirossi	6		Team Pileri	Honda NSR500	M
1996	11	(United States) Scott Russell	6		Suzuki MotGP	Suzuki RGV500	M
1997	18	(Japan) Nobuatsu Aoki	Third		Technical Sports Racing	Honda NSR500	M
1998	6	(Italy) Max Biaggi	Second	2	Team Kanemoto	Honda NSR500	M
1999	31	(Japan) Tetsuya Harada	10		Aprilia Racing	Aprilia RSW-2 500	D
2000	46	(Italy) Valentino Rossi	Second	2	Nastro Azzurro	Honda NSR500	M
2001	56	(Japan) Shinya Nakano	5		Tech3	Yamaha YZR500	M

== 250cc Rookie of the Year riders ==
The following list compiling the rookie riders who collects the most World Championship points during their first season of competition in the 250cc class from 2002 to the 2009 season.

Season	No.	Rider	Rider standings	Wins	Team	Bike	Tyres
2002	24	(Spain) Toni Elías	4	1	Telefónica Movistar	Aprilia RSV 250	D
2003	54	(San Marino) Manuel Poggiali	Champion	4	MS Aprilia Team	Aprilia RSV 250	D
2004	54	(Spain) Dani Pedrosa	Champion	7	Telefónica Movistar Honda	Honda RS250RW	D
2005	34	(Italy) Andrea Dovizioso	Third		Team Scot	Honda RS250RW	D
2006	73	(Japan) Shuhei Aoyama	8		Repsol Honda	Honda RS250RW	D
2007	19	(Spain) Álvaro Bautista	4	2	Master MVA Aspar Team	Aprilia RSA 250	D
2008	75	(Italy) Mattia Pasini	8	1	Polaris World	Aprilia RSA 250	D
2009	35	(Italy) Raffaele De Rosa	6		Scot Racing Team	Honda RS250RW	D

== 125cc Rookie of the Year riders ==
The following list compiling the rookie riders who collects the most World Championship points during their first season of competition in the 125cc class from 1990 to the 2011 season.

Season	No.	Rider	Rider standings	Wins	Team	Bike	Tyres
1990	65	(Italy) Loris Capirossi	Champion	3	Polini Racing	Honda RS125	D
1991	56	(Japan) Noboru Ueda	5	2	Hero Sports TS	Honda RS125	B
1992	31	(Spain) Carlos Giro Jr.	12		Carlos Giró Team	Aprilia RS125R	D
1993	36	(Japan) Takeshi Tsujimura	Third	1	F.C.C. Technical Sports	Honda RS125R	B
1994	32	(Italy) Stefano Perugini	7		Ipa Corse FMI Aprilia	Aprilia RS125R	D
1995	20	(Japan) Tomomi Manako	8		FCC Technical Sports	Honda RS125R	B
1996	46	(Italy) Valentino Rossi	9	1	Scuderia AGV	Aprilia RS125R	D
1997	15	(Italy) Roberto Locatelli	8		Team Axo Inoxmacel	Honda RS125R	D
1998	13	(Italy) Marco Melandri	Third	2	Matteoni Racing	Honda RS125R	D
1999	16	(Italy) Simone Sanna	8		Polini Racing	Honda RS125R	D
2000	15	(San Marino) Alex De Angelis	18		Matteoni Racing	Honda RS125R	D
2001	26	(Spain) Dani Pedrosa	8		Honda Racing	Honda RS125R	D
2002	36	(Finland) Mika Kallio	11		Ajo Motorsport	Honda RS125R	D
2003	27	(Australia) Casey Stoner	8	1	LCR Team	Aprilia RS125R	D
2004	54	(Italy) Mattia Pasini	15		LCR Team	Aprilia RS125R	D
2005	71	(Japan) Tomoyoshi Koyama	8		Ajo Motorsport	Honda RS125R	D
2006	38	(United Kingdom) Bradley Smith	19		Honda Racing	Honda RS125R	D
2007	44	(Spain) Pol Espargaró	9		Campetella Racing	Aprilia RS125R	D
2008	45	(United Kingdom) Scott Redding	11	1	Esponsorama Racing	Aprilia RS125R	D
2009	94	(Germany) Jonas Folger	12		Ongetta Team I.S.P.A.	Aprilia RS125R	D
2010	39	(Spain) Luis Salom	12		Lambretta (1–2), Molenaar Racing (3–17)	Lambretta 125 (1–2), Aprilia RSA 125 (3–17)	D
2011	25	(Spain) Maverick Viñales	Third	4	Esponsorama Racing	Aprilia RSA 125	D
