= Esponsorama Racing =

European motorcycle racing team

- 2022 name: Moto3: QJMotor Avintia Racing Team; MotoE: Avintia Esponsorama Racing
- Base: Madrid, Spain
- Principal: Raúl Romero
- Motorcycle: Moto3: KTM RC250GP; MotoE: Energica Ego Corsa
- Riders' Championships: CEV Fórmula Extreme: 2003: José David de Gea; 2005: José David de Gea; 2006: José David de Gea; Spanish 125GP Championship: 2007: Stefan Bradl; 2008: Efrén Vázquez

Esponsorama Racing was a motorcycle racing team who formerly competed in the various categories of Grand Prix road racing from 2000 to 2022.

The team was established in 1994 by Raúl Romero and Josep Oliva as By Queroseno Racing, also known as Team BQR. In 2012 the team changed its name to Avintia Racing, following an alliance between BQR and the Grupo Avintia. In 2020 the team rebranded itself as Esponsorama Racing, in line with their registered company name, though Grupo Avintia remained as a main sponsor.

At the end of the 2022 season, the team left the Grand Prix racing paddock after 23 seasons.

== History ==
=== Domestic racing ===
Team BQR started competing in the Spanish Road Racing Championship (Campeonato de España de Velocidad). Between 2005 and 2008 the team won three Fórmula Extreme titles with José David de Gea and two 125GP class titles with Stefan Bradl and Efrén Vázquez.

=== Grand Prix racing ===
==== 125 and 250 cc classes ====
After many World Championship wildcard appearances, BQR became a full entry in the 2001 season using Honda bikes in the 250 cc class. In 2007 the team switched to Aprilia machinery. BQR won its first World Championship race with Scott Redding riding an Aprilia 125 at the 2008 British Grand Prix.

==== Moto2 ====
The team unveiled the first Moto2 bike in February 2009 and fielded a prototype in the 2009 Spanish Road Racing Championship. In 2010, they participated in the new Moto2 World Championship, with Yonny Hernández and Mashel Al Naimi as riders. The team continued in Moto2 until the conclusion of the 2013 season. In 2018, the team made a significant number of wildcard entries with rider Xavi Cardelús.

==== MotoGP ====
In 2012 the team debuted in the MotoGP class as a Claiming Rule Team using both FTR Moto and Inmotec frames badged as BQR, powered by Kawasaki engines. The riders were Iván Silva and Yonny Hernández. In 2013 Avintia entered the MotoGP class with Kawasaki-engined FTR frames, fielding two bikes for Hiroshi Aoyama and Héctor Barberá.

For the 2014 season Aoyama was replaced by Mike Di Meglio and the team fielded a new bike badged as the Avintia GP14, reportedly based on the 2007-2009 Kawasaki Ninja ZX-RR with some input from Kawasaki. Following a mid-season agreement between Avintia and Ducati, Barberá received an Open-specification Ducati Desmosedici for the last five rounds.

In 2015 the team entered two Open class Desmosedici GP14 motorcycles, for Barberá and Di Meglio. For 2016 Di Meglio was replaced by Loris Baz. In 2017 the team changed its name to Reale Esponsorama Racing.

In 2018, two bikes were fielded for Tito Rabat and Xavier Siméon. Former rider Rubén Xaus joined the team as Siméon's coach. At the British Grand Prix, Rabat's major crash with Franco Morbidelli at Stowe corner was a contributing factor in the decision to cancel the race due to unsafe conditions. As a result of the triple fracture he sustained to his right leg, Rabat missed the remaining 7 races of the 2018 season, and was replaced by Christophe Ponsson and Jordi Torres. For 2019, Rabat returned and was partnered by Czech rider Karel Abraham.

In 2020 the team now known as Esponsorama Racing retained Tito Rabat, this time paired with KTM factory exile Johann Zarco. They also received a factory-support from Ducati - with the one-year old Desmosedici-spec bikes - because of the direct contract from Ducati for Zarco. For 2021, 2020 Moto2 World Champion Enea Bastianini and Luca Marini joined the team, both using a 2019-specification Ducati Desmosedici. The riders had different liveries on their bike, as Marini used the Sky Racing Team VR46 livery, entered under the Italian flag, in an agreement with VR46. At the end of the 2021 season, Esponsorama announced they would be leaving the MotoGP class after 10 seasons, with the VR46 team taking their grid slots, and focusing on their Moto3 and MotoE activities.

==== Moto3 ====
In 2017, Avintia debuted in the Moto3 class entering a KTM for Vicente Pérez in two races as a wildcard. For 2018 the team entered a single full-season entry, beginning the season with Livio Loi for the first seven rounds and replacing him with Pérez for the remainder of the season. In 2019 the team began with Pérez for the first seven rounds, but replacing him with Stefano Nepa for the remaining races, and addition to a number of wildcard entries for Nepa, Meikon Kawakami, and Carlos Tatay. In 2020, Avintia entered reigning Red Bull Rookies champion Tatay as their sole full-season entry in the class.

==== MotoE ====
As a satellite team in MotoGP, Avintia was given an entry in the inaugural MotoE World Cup in 2019. The team achieved two wins with Eric Granado and two podiums with their former MotoGP rider Xavier Siméon, good for third and sixth place in the championship, respectively. For the 2020 season, the team retained Granado and partnered him with their former Moto2 rider, Andorran Xavier Cardelús.

== Results ==
Year	Class	Team name	Motorcycle	Riders	Races	Wins	Podiums	Poles	F. laps	Points	Pos.
2003	250cc	Troll Honda BQR	Honda RS250R	(Spain) Alex Debón	16	0	0	0	0	81	11th
2003	250cc	Troll Honda BQR	Honda RS250R	(Andorra) Eric Bataille	15	0	0	0	0	28	19th
2004	250cc	Würth Honda BQR	Honda RS250R	(Spain) Alex Debón	15	0	0	0	0	82	12th
2004	250cc	Würth Honda BQR	Honda RS250R	(Spain) José David de Gea	5	0	0	0	0	8	27th
2004	250cc	Würth Honda BQR	Honda RS250R	(Andorra) Eric Bataille	10	0	0	0	0	12	24th
2005	250cc	Würth Honda BQR	Honda RS250R	(Spain) Alex Debón	16	0	0	0	0	67	12th
2005	250cc	Würth Honda BQR	Honda RS250R	(Spain) Arturo Tizón	3	0	0	0	0	0	NC
2005	250cc	Würth Honda BQR	Honda RS250R	(Australia) Anthony West	1 (7) (Note: Non-bracketed number refers to the number accumulated with team, with number in brackets referring to the total accumulated for the season.)	0	0	0	0	0 (30)	17th
2005	250cc	Würth Honda BQR	Honda RS250R	(Czech Republic) Radomil Rous	11	0	0	0	0	11	25th
2005	125cc	Würth Honda BQR	Honda RS125R	(Spain) Tito Rabat	1	0	0	0	0	0	NC
2006	250cc	Würth Honda BQR	Honda RS250R	(Spain) Arturo Tizón	16	0	0	0	0	11	23rd
2006	250cc	Würth Honda BQR	Honda RS250R	(Colombia) Martín Cárdenas	7 (11)	0	0	0	0	28 (37)	15th
2006	250cc	Würth Honda BQR	Honda RS250R	(Turkey) Sinan Sofuoğlu	1	0	0	0	0	0	NC
2006	250cc	Würth Honda BQR	Honda RS250R	(Spain) Aleix Espargaró	9	0	0	0	0	20	19th
2006	125cc	Würth Honda BQR	Honda RS125R	(Spain) Tito Rabat	11	0	0	0	0	11	23rd
2006	125cc	Würth Honda BQR	Honda RS125R	(Spain) Aleix Espargaró	6	0	0	0	0	0	NC
2007	250cc	Blusens Aprilia; Blusens Aprilia Germany	Aprilia RSV 250	(Spain) Arturo Tizón	6	0	0	0	0	1	30th
2007	250cc	Blusens Aprilia; Blusens Aprilia Germany	Aprilia RSV 250	(Spain) Efrén Vázquez	10	0	0	0	0	1	29th
2007	250cc	Blusens Aprilia; Blusens Aprilia Germany	Aprilia RSV 250	(Spain) Aleix Espargaró	17	0	0	0	0	47	15th
2007	125cc	Blusens Aprilia; Blusens Aprilia Germany	Aprilia RS 125	(Spain) Pablo Nieto	17	0	0	0	0	57	15th
2007	125cc	Blusens Aprilia; Blusens Aprilia Germany	Aprilia RS 125	(Netherlands) Hugo van den Berg	12	0	0	0	0	0	NC
2007	125cc	Blusens Aprilia; Blusens Aprilia Germany	Aprilia RS 125	(Germany) Stefan Bradl	9	0	0	0	0	39	18th
2008	250cc	Blusens Aprilia	Aprilia RSV 250	(Spain) Russell Gómez	9	0	0	0	0	0	NC
2008	250cc	Blusens Aprilia	Aprilia RSV 250	(Spain) Manuel Hernández	7	0	0	0	0	5	23rd
2008	250cc	Blusens Aprilia	Aprilia RSV 250	(Republic of Ireland) Eugene Laverty	12	0	0	0	0	8	21st
2008	250cc	Blusens Aprilia	Aprilia RSV 250	(Spain) Daniel Arcas	4 (5)	0	0	0	0	2	25th
2008	125cc	Blusens Aprilia Junior	Aprilia RS 125	(Spain) Efrén Vázquez	15	0	0	0	1	31	20th
2008	125cc	Blusens Aprilia Junior	Aprilia RS 125	(United Kingdom) Scott Redding	17	1	1	0	2	105	11th
2008	125cc	BQR Blusens	Aprilia RS 125	(Italy) Dino Lombardi	2	0	0	0	0	0	NC
2009	250cc	Aeropuerto-Castello-Blusens	Aprilia RSA 250	(Spain) Alex Debón	16	0	1	0	1	101	10th
2009	125cc	Blusens-Aprilia	Aprilia RSA 125	(Spain) Esteve Rabat	16	0	0	0	0	37	18th
2009	125cc	Blusens-Aprilia	Aprilia RSA 125	(United Kingdom) Scott Redding	16	0	1	0	0	50.5	15th
2009	125cc	Blusens-Aprilia	Aprilia RS 125	(Spain) Johnny Rosell	2	0	0	0	0	0	NC
2010	Moto2	Blusens-STX	BQR-Moto2	(Spain) Dani Rivas	1 (2)	0	0	0	0	0	NC
2010	Moto2	Blusens-STX	BQR-Moto2	(Colombia) Yonny Hernández	17	0	0	0	0	32	21st
2010	Moto2	Blusens-STX	BQR-Moto2	(Qatar) Mashel Al Naimi	15	0	0	0	0	0	NC
2010	Moto2	Blusens-STX	BQR-Moto2	(France) Anthony Delhalle	2 (3)	0	0	0	0	0	NC
2010	125cc	Blusens-STX	Aprilia RSA 125	(Spain) Esteve Rabat	17	0	2	0	0	147	6th
2011	Moto2	Blusens-STX	FTR M211	(Spain) Joan Olivé	1 (6)	0	0	0	0	0	NC
2011	Moto2	Blusens-STX	FTR M211	(United States) Kenny Noyes	17	0	0	0	0	11	28th
2011	Moto2	Blusens-STX	FTR M211	(Colombia) Martín Cárdenas	1	0	0	0	0	0	NC
2011	Moto2	Blusens-STX	FTR M211	(Spain) Esteve Rabat	17	0	1	0	0	79	10th
2011	Moto2	Blusens-STX	FTR M211	(Colombia) Yonny Hernández	14	0	0	0	1	43	19th
2011	125cc	Blusens by Paris Hilton Racing	Aprilia RSA 125	(Spain) Maverick Viñales	17	4	9	3	3	248	3rd
2011	125cc	Blusens by Paris Hilton Racing	Aprilia RSA 125	(Spain) Josep Rodríguez	5 (8)	0	0	0	0	2 (3)	32nd
2011	125cc	Blusens by Paris Hilton Racing	Aprilia RSA 125	(Spain) Sergio Gadea	12	0	2	0	0	103	9th
2012	MotoGP	Avintia Blusens	BQR-Kawasaki	(Spain) Iván Silva	16	0	0	0	0	12	23rd
2012	MotoGP	Avintia Blusens	BQR-Kawasaki	(Colombia) Yonny Hernández	15	0	0	0	0	28	17th
2012	MotoGP	Avintia Blusens	BQR-Kawasaki	(Spain) David Salom	2	0	0	0	0	1	27th
2012	MotoGP	Avintia Blusens	BQR-Kawasaki	(Australia) Kris McLaren	0	0	0	0	0	0	NC
2012	MotoGP	Avintia Blusens	BQR-Kawasaki	(Japan) Hiroshi Aoyama	1	0	0	0	0	3	25th
2012	MotoGP	Avintia Blusens	Inmotec-Kawasaki	(Italy) Claudio Corti	1	0	0	0	0	0	NC
2012	Moto2	Avintia Blusens	FTR Moto M212; Suter MMX2	(Spain) Julián Simón	17	0	2	0	0	81	13th
2013	MotoGP	Avintia Blusens	FTR MGP13	(Japan) Hiroshi Aoyama	16	0	0	0	0	13	20th
2013	MotoGP	Avintia Blusens	FTR MGP13	(Spain) Héctor Barberá	18	0	0	0	0	35	16th
2013	MotoGP	Avintia Blusens	FTR MGP13	(Spain) Iván Silva	1	0	0	0	0	0	NC
2013	MotoGP	Avintia Blusens	FTR MGP13	(Spain) Javier del Amor	1	0	0	0	0	1	27th
2013	Moto2	Avintia Blusens	Kalex	(United Kingdom) Kyle Smith	9	0	0	0	0	0	NC
2013	Moto2	Avintia Blusens	Kalex	(Spain) Toni Elías	11	0	0	0	0	22	18th
2013	Moto2	Avintia Blusens	Kalex	(Spain) Dani Rivas	1 (3)	0	0	0	0	0	NC
2013	Moto2	Avintia Blusens	Kalex	(Argentina) Ezequiel Iturrioz	6	0	0	0	0	0	NC
2013	Moto2	Avintia Blusens	Kalex	(Spain) Álex Mariñelarena	4 (6)	0	0	0	0	2	27th
2014	MotoGP	Avintia Racing	Avintia GP14; Ducati Desmosedici GP14	(Spain) Héctor Barberá	18	0	0	0	0	26	18th
2014	MotoGP	Avintia Racing	Avintia GP14; Ducati Desmosedici GP14	(France) Mike Di Meglio	18	0	0	0	0	9	25th
2015	MotoGP	Avintia Racing	Ducati Desmosedici GP14	(Spain) Héctor Barberá	18	0	0	0	0	33	15th
2015	MotoGP	Avintia Racing	Ducati Desmosedici GP14	(France) Mike Di Meglio	18	0	0	0	0	8	24th
2016	MotoGP	Avintia Racing	Ducati Desmosedici GP14	(Spain) Héctor Barberá	16 (18)	0	0	0	0	102	10th
2016	MotoGP	Avintia Racing	Ducati Desmosedici GP14	(France) Loris Baz	15	0	0	0	0	35	20th
2016	MotoGP	Avintia Racing	Ducati Desmosedici GP14	(Italy) Michele Pirro	2 (7)	0	0	0	0	1 (36)	19th
2016	MotoGP	Avintia Racing	Ducati Desmosedici GP14	(Spain) Javier Forés	1	0	0	0	0	0	NC
2016	MotoGP	Avintia Racing	Ducati Desmosedici GP14	(Australia) Mike Jones	2	0	0	0	0	1	27th
2017	MotoGP	Reale Avintia Racing	Ducati Desmosedici GP16	(Spain) Héctor Barberá	18	0	0	0	0	28	22nd
2017	MotoGP	Reale Avintia Racing	Ducati Desmosedici GP15	(France) Loris Baz	18	0	0	0	0	45	18th
2017	Moto3	Reale Avintia Academy	KTM RC250GP	(Spain) Vicente Pérez	2	0	0	0	0	0	NC
2018	MotoGP	Reale Avintia Racing	Ducati Desmosedici GP16; Ducati Desmosedici GP17	(Belgium) Xavier Siméon	18	0	0	0	0	1	26th
2018	MotoGP	Reale Avintia Racing	Ducati Desmosedici GP16	(France) Christophe Ponsson	1	0	0	0	0	0	NC
2018	MotoGP	Reale Avintia Racing	Ducati Desmosedici GP17	(Spain) Tito Rabat	12	0	0	0	0	35	17th
2018	MotoGP	Reale Avintia Racing	Ducati Desmosedici GP16	(Spain) Jordi Torres	5	0	0	0	0	0	NC
2018	Moto2	Reale Avintia Stylobike	Kalex Moto2	(Andorra) Xavier Cardelús	12	0	0	0	0	0	NC
2018	Moto3	Reale Avintia Academy 77	KTM RC250GP	(Belgium) Livio Loi	8	0	0	0	0	8	30th
2018	Moto3	Reale Avintia Academy 77	KTM RC250GP	(Spain) Vicente Pérez	9	0	0	0	0	26	16th
2019	MotoGP	Reale Avintia Racing	Ducati Desmosedici GP18	(Czech Republic) Karel Abraham	19	0	0	0	0	9	24th
2019	MotoGP	Reale Avintia Racing	Ducati Desmosedici GP18	(Spain) Tito Rabat	18	0	0	0	0	23	20th
2019	Moto3	Reale Avintia Arizona 77; Fundacion Andreas Perez 77	KTM RC250GP	(Spain) Vicente Pérez	7	0	0	0	0	0	NC
2019	Moto3	Reale Avintia Arizona 77; Fundacion Andreas Perez 77	KTM RC250GP	(Italy) Stefano Nepa	13	0	0	0	0	24	25th
2019	Moto3	Reale Avintia Arizona 77; Fundacion Andreas Perez 77	KTM RC250GP	(Brazil) Meikon Kawakami	2	0	0	0	0	0	NC
2019	Moto3	Reale Avintia Arizona 77; Fundacion Andreas Perez 77	KTM RC250GP	(Spain) Carlos Tatay	3	0	0	0	0	8	30th
2019	MotoE	Avintia Esponsorama Racing	Energica Ego Corsa	(Belgium) Xavier Siméon	6	0	2	0	0	58	6th
2019	MotoE	Avintia Esponsorama Racing	Energica Ego Corsa	(Brazil) Eric Granado	6	2	2	2	2	71	3rd
2020	MotoGP	Hublot Reale Avintia Racing; Hublot Reale Avintia; Esponsorama Racing	Ducati Desmosedici GP19	(France) Johann Zarco	14	0	1	1	1	77	13th
2020	MotoGP	Hublot Reale Avintia Racing; Hublot Reale Avintia; Esponsorama Racing	Ducati Desmosedici GP19	(Spain) Tito Rabat	14	0	0	0	0	10	22nd
2020	Moto3	Hublot Reale Avintia Racing; Hublot Reale Avintia; Esponsorama Racing	KTM RC250GP	(Spain) Carlos Tatay	15	0	0	0	0	26	22nd
2020	MotoE	Avintia Esponsorama Racing	Energica Ego Corsa	(Andorra) Xavier Cardelús	7	0	0	0	0	34	15th
2020	MotoE	Avintia Esponsorama Racing	Energica Ego Corsa	(Brazil) Eric Granado	7	1	1	1	2	53	7th
2021	MotoGP	Sky VR46 Esponsorama; Sky VR46 Avintia; Esponsorama Racing; Avintia Esponsorama	Ducati Desmosedici GP19	(Italy) Luca Marini	18	0	0	0	0	41	19th
2021	MotoGP	Sky VR46 Esponsorama; Sky VR46 Avintia; Esponsorama Racing; Avintia Esponsorama	Ducati Desmosedici GP19	(Italy) Enea Bastianini	18	0	2	0	1	102	11th
2021	Moto3	Avintia VR46; Avintia VR46 Academy; Avintia Esponsorama Racing	KTM RC250GP	(Italy) Ellia Bartolini	4	0	0	0	0	7	27th
2021	Moto3	Avintia VR46; Avintia VR46 Academy; Avintia Esponsorama Racing	KTM RC250GP	(Italy) Niccolò Antonelli	16	0	4	1	0	152	6th
2021	Moto3	Avintia VR46; Avintia VR46 Academy; Avintia Esponsorama Racing	KTM RC250GP	(Spain) Carlos Tatay	14	0	0	0	0	40	21st
2021	MotoE	Avintia Esponsorama Racing	Energica Ego Corsa	(Portugal) André Pires	6	0	0	0	0	12	18th
2021	MotoE	Avintia Esponsorama Racing	Energica Ego Corsa	(Andorra) Xavier Cardelús	7	0	0	0	0	21	16th
2022	Moto3	QJmotor Avintia Racing Team	KTM RC250GP	(Italy) Matteo Bertelle	10	0	0	0	0	16	24th
2022	Moto3	QJmotor Avintia Racing Team	KTM RC250GP	(Italy) Elia Bartolini	20	0	0	0	0	27	22nd
2022	Moto3	QJmotor Avintia Racing Team	KTM RC250GP	(Italy) Luca Lunetta	1	0	0	0	0	0	35th
2022	Moto3	QJmotor Avintia Racing Team	KTM RC250GP	(Italy) Nicola Carraro	9	0	0	0	0	0	29th
2022	MotoE	Avintia Esponsorama Racing	Energica Ego Corsa	(Andorra) Xavier Cardelús	6	0	0	0	0	31	15th
2022	MotoE	Avintia Esponsorama Racing	Energica Ego Corsa	(Spain) Yeray Ruiz	2	0	0	0	0	0	23rd
2022	MotoE	Avintia Esponsorama Racing	Energica Ego Corsa	(Spain) Unai Orradre	2	0	0	0	0	2	22nd

Notes

* Season still in progress.

== MotoGP results ==
(key) (Races in bold indicate pole position; races in italics indicate fastest lap)

Year	Tyres	Constructor	Team	No.	Riders	Race																				Rider's standings		Team standings		Manufactures standings	
Year	Tyres	Constructor	Team	No.	Riders	1	2	3	4	5	6	7	8	9	10	11	12	13	14	15	16	17	18	19	20	Pts	Pos	Pts	Pos	Pts	Pos
2012	B					QAT	SPA	POR	FRA	CAT	GBR	NED	GER	ITA	USA	IND	CZE	RSM	ARA	JPN	MAL	AUS	VAL								
2012	B	BQR-FTR Kawasaki	(Spain) Avintia Blusens	22	(Spain) Iván Silva	16																				0 (12) (Note: Non-bracketed number refers to the number accumulated with the motorcycle, with number in brackets referring to the total accumulated for the season.)	23rd	44	10th	2	11th
2012	B	BQR-FTR Kawasaki	(Spain) Avintia Blusens	68	(Colombia) Yonny Hernández	14																				2 (28)	17th	44	10th	2	11th
2012	B	BQR Kawasaki	(Spain) Avintia Blusens	22	(Spain) Iván Silva		15	Ret	18	20	18	12	18	16	14	12	Ret			Ret	Ret	15	Ret			12 (12)	23rd	44	10th	35	6th
2012	B	BQR Kawasaki	(Spain) Avintia Blusens	43	(Australia) Kris McLaren																	DNQ				0	NC	44	10th	35	6th
2012	B	BQR Kawasaki	(Spain) Avintia Blusens	44	(Spain) David Salom													15	Ret							1	27th	44	10th	35	6th
2012	B	BQR Kawasaki	(Spain) Avintia Blusens	68	(Colombia) Yonny Hernández		Ret	Ret	15	18	15	Ret	14	Ret	12	9	12	12	13	Ret	DNS					26 (28)	17th	44	10th	35	6th
2012	B	BQR Kawasaki	(Spain) Avintia Blusens	73	(Japan) Hiroshi Aoyama																		13			3	25th	44	10th	35	6th
2013	B					QAT	AME	SPA	FRA	ITA	CAT	NED	GER	USA	IND	CZE	GBR	RSM	ARA	MAL	AUS	JPN	VAL								
2013	B	FTR Kawasaki	(Spain) Avintia Blusens	7	(Japan) Hiroshi Aoyama	15	17	18	19	Ret	WD		17	16	15	14	18	14	14	11	20	17	16			13	20th	49	10th	46	5th
2013	B	FTR Kawasaki	(Spain) Avintia Blusens	8	(Spain) Héctor Barberá	13	18	12	18	10	Ret	20	11	10	16	Ret	13	Ret	Ret	14	14	16	12			35	16th	49	10th	46	5th
2013	B	FTR Kawasaki	(Spain) Avintia Blusens	22	(Spain) Iván Silva							23														0	NC	49	10th	46	5th
2013	B	FTR Kawasaki	(Spain) Avintia Blusens	77	(Spain) Javier del Amor						15															1	27th	49	10th	46	5th
2014	B					QAT	AME	ARG	SPA	FRA	ITA	CAT	NED	GER	IND	CZE	GBR	RSM	ARA	JPN	AUS	MAL	VAL								
2014	B	Ducati	(Spain) Avintia Racing	8	(Spain) Héctor Barberá														19	15	5	9	11			24 (26)	18th	35	10th	211	3rd
2014	B	Avintia	(Spain) Avintia Racing	8	(Spain) Héctor Barberá	Ret	15	16	15	Ret	Ret	19	18	18	Ret	17	19	19								2 (26)	18th	35	10th	11	7th
2014	B	Avintia	(Spain) Avintia Racing	63	(France) Mike Di Meglio	17	18	19	Ret	19	18	Ret	20	22	12	18	20	Ret	17	19	14	13	21			9	25th	35	10th	11	7th
2015	B					QAT	AME	ARG	SPA	FRA	ITA	CAT	NED	GER	IND	CZE	GBR	RSM	ARA	JPN	AUS	MAL	VAL								
2015	B	Ducati	(Spain) Avintia Racing	8	(Spain) Héctor Barberá	15	12	13	14	13	13	16	Ret	13	15	16	13	18	16	9	16	13	16			33	15th	41	9th	256	3rd
2015	B	Ducati	(Spain) Avintia Racing	63	(France) Mike Di Meglio	19	Ret	18	22	Ret	16	14	18	Ret	17	18	14	13	20	15	20	18	Ret			8	24th	41	9th	256	3rd
2016	M					QAT	ARG	AME	SPA	FRA	ITA	CAT	NED	GER	GBR	AUT	CZE	RSM	ARA	MAL	JPN	AUS	VAL								
2016	M	Ducati	(Spain) Avintia Racing	7	(Australia) Mike Jones															16	15					1	27th	139	9th	261	3rd
2016	M	Ducati	(Spain) Avintia Racing	8	(Spain) Héctor Barberá	9	5	9	10	8	12	11	6	9	DSQ	5	14	13	13			4	11			102	10th	139	9th	261	3rd
2016	M	Ducati	(Spain) Avintia Racing	12	(Spain) Javier Forés													Ret								0	NC	139	9th	261	3rd
2016	M	Ducati	(Spain) Avintia Racing	51	(Italy) Michele Pirro							15	Ret													1 (36)	19th	139	9th	261	3rd
2016	M	Ducati	(Spain) Avintia Racing	76	(France) Loris Baz	Ret	Ret	15	13	12	Ret			17	13	14	DNS		18	16	Ret	13	18			35	20th	139	9th	261	3rd
2017	M					QAT	ARG	AME	SPA	FRA	ITA	CAT	NED	GER	CZE	AUT	GBR	RSM	ARA	JPN	AUS	MAL	VAL								
2017	M	Ducati	(Spain) Reale Avintia Racing	8	(Spain) Héctor Barberá	13	13	14	12	Ret	14	9	16	DSQ	20	17	14	Ret	18	14	20	14	15			28	22nd	73	11th	310	3rd
2017	M	Ducati	(Spain) Reale Avintia Racing	76	(France) Loris Baz	12	11	Ret	13	9	18	12	8	19	Ret	9	15	16	21	10	18	Ret	16			45	18th	73	11th	310	3rd
2018	M					QAT	ARG	AME	SPA	FRA	ITA	CAT	NED	GER	CZE	AUT	GBR	RSM	ARA	THA	JPN	AUS	MAL	VAL							
2018	M	Ducati	(Spain) Reale Avintia Racing	10	(Belgium) Xavier Siméon	21	21	20	17	18	17	Ret	Ret	19	20	Ret	C	Ret	19	18	16	15	17	DNS		1	27th	37	12th	335	2nd
2018	M	Ducati	(Spain) Reale Avintia Racing	23	(France) Christophe Ponsson													23								0	NC	37	12th	335	2nd
2018	M	Ducati	(Spain) Reale Avintia Racing	53	(Spain) Tito Rabat	11	7	8	14	Ret	13	Ret	16	13	Ret	11	C									35	19th	37	12th	335	2nd
2018	M	Ducati	(Spain) Reale Avintia Racing	81	(Spain) Jordi Torres														20	19	17	17	DNS	14		1	28th	37	12th	335	2nd
2019	M					QAT	ARG	AME	SPA	FRA	ITA	CAT	NED	GER	CZE	AUT	GBR	RSM	ARA	THA	JPN	AUS	MAL	VAL							
2019	M	Ducati	(Spain) Reale Avintia Racing	17	(Czech Republic) Karel Abraham	18	Ret	16	16	DSQ	14	Ret	17	15	19	15	15	17	18	19	18	14	17	14		9	24th	32	11th	318	3rd
2019	M	Ducati	(Spain) Reale Avintia Racing	53	(Spain) Tito Rabat	19	Ret	15	15	Ret	Ret	9	16	11	16	Ret	16	13	15	17	DNS	Ret		11		23	20th	32	11th	318	3rd
2020	M					SPA	ANC	CZE	AUT	STY	RSM	EMI	CAT	FRA	ARA	TER	EUR	VAL	POR												
2020	M	Ducati	(Spain) Hublot Reale Avintia Racing (Spain) Hublot Reale Avintia (Spain) Esponsorama Racing	5	(France) Johann Zarco	11	9	**3**	Ret	14	15	11	Ret	5	10	5	9	Ret	10							77	13th	87	10th	221	1st
2020	M	Ducati	(Spain) Hublot Reale Avintia Racing (Spain) Hublot Reale Avintia (Spain) Esponsorama Racing	53	(Spain) Tito Rabat	14	11	16	16	21	Ret	Ret	15	Ret	20	14	Ret	17	18							10	22nd	87	10th	221	1st
2021	M					QAT	DOH	POR	SPA	FRA	ITA	CAT	GER	NED	STY	AUT	GBR	ARA	RSM	AME	EMI	ALR	VAL								
2021	M	Ducati	(Italy) Sky VR46 Esponsorama (Spain) Esponsorama Racing	10	(Italy) Luca Marini	16	18	12	15	12	17	12	15	18	14	5	15	20	19	14	9	12	17			41	19th	143	8th	357	1st
2021	M	Ducati	(Italy) Sky VR46 Esponsorama (Spain) Esponsorama Racing	23	(Italy) Enea Bastianini	10	11	9	Ret	14	Ret	10	16	15	12	Ret	12	6	3	6	3	9	8			102	11th	143	8th	357	1st
