= Paddock Grand Prix =

- 2014 name: Interwetten Paddock Moto2 Racing (Moto2); Interwetten Paddock Moto3 (Moto3)
- Base: Switzerland
- Principal: Daniel Epp
- Rider(s): 12. Thomas Lüthi (Moto2); 65. Philipp Öttl (Moto3)
- Motorcycle: Suter MMX (Moto2); Kalex KTM (Moto3)
- Tyres: Dunlop
- Riders' Championships: 125cc: Thomas Lüthi (2005)

Paddock Grand Prix was a Grand Prix motorcycle racing team from Switzerland who competed in the FIM Road Racing World Championship from 2002 until 2014, before being acquired by team Technomag. In 2005, Paddock's rider Thomas Lüthi won the 125cc title.

== History ==
The team began racing as Elit Grand Prix in the 2002 season with Czech rider Jakub Smrž on a Honda RS125R.

At the 2005 French Grand Prix the Paddock team achieved its first victory thanks to Thomas Lüthi who won the 125cc race. At the end of the season he secured the world championship title in the 125cc class. In the 2007 season the team, known as Emmi - Caffè Latte Racing Team, switched to Aprilia bikes with rider Sandro Cortese on an Aprilia RS 125 R in the 125 class and Thomas Lüthi on an Aprilia RSV 250 in the 250 division.

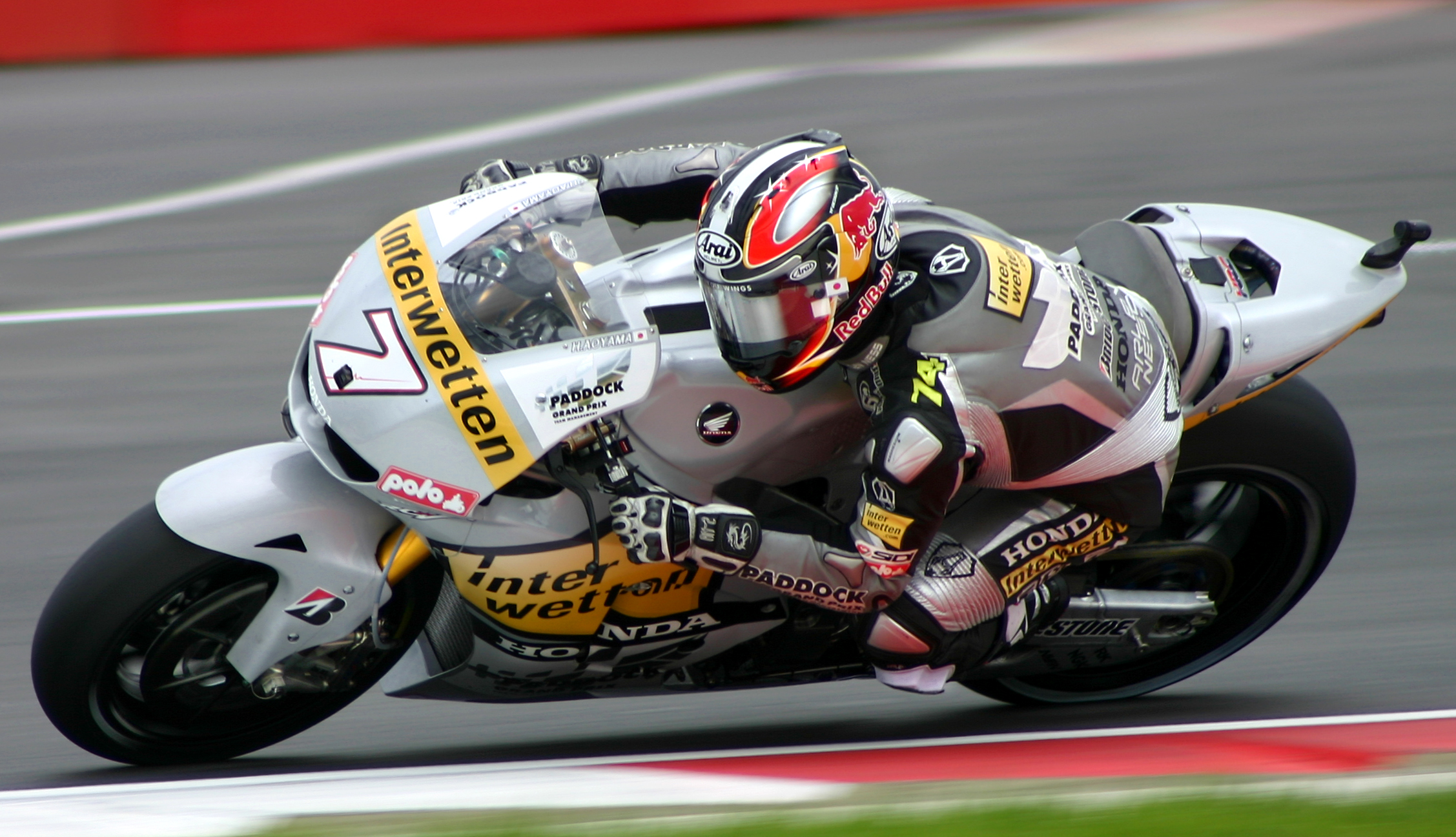
Hiroshi Aoyama at the 2010 British Grand Prix

For the 2010 season, the team was renamed Interwetten Racing. Lüthi finished the season in fourth place in the inaugural Moto2 campaign, riding a Honda-powered Moriwaki chassis. The Interwetten team also fielded a bike in the MotoGP class for the first time with former 250cc world champion Hiroshi Aoyama finishing in 15th place aboard a Honda RC212V. Interwetten rider Marcel Schrötter finished 18th in the 125cc class on a Honda RS125R.

Between 2011 and 2014 the Interwetten Paddock team fielded a Suter bike for Thomas Lüthi in the Moto2 class. Since 2013 the team expanded its activities to the Moto3 class with a Kalex-KTM bike for Philipp Öttl.

For 2015 the Paddock team was acquired by the Technomag team and its base was relocated in France on the CGBM Evolution premises, near the Paul Ricard Circuit.

== Results ==
Year	Class	Team name	Bike	Riders	Races	Wins	Podiums	Poles	F. laps	Points	Pos.
2002	125cc	Elit Grand Prix	Honda	(Czech Republic) Jakub Smrž	7	0	0	0	0	3	32nd
2002	125cc	Elit Grand Prix	Honda	(Switzerland) Thomas Lüthi	7	0	0	0	0	7	27th
2002	125cc	Elit Grand Prix	Honda	(Japan) Hideyuki Nakajo	1	0	0	0	0	6	28th
2003	250cc	Elit Grand Prix	Honda	(Czech Republic) Jakub Smrž	13	0	0	0	0	14	24th
2003	250cc	Elit Grand Prix	Honda	(Czech Republic) Jaroslav Huleš	5 (9) (Note: Non-bracketed number refers to the number accumulated with team, with number in brackets referring to the total accumulated for the season.)	0	0	0	0	10 (10)	25th
2003	125cc	Elit Grand Prix	Honda	(Switzerland) Thomas Lüthi	16	0	1	0	0	68	15th
2004	125cc	Elit Grand Prix	Honda	(Switzerland) Thomas Lüthi	13	0	0	0	0	14	25th
2004	125cc	Elit Grand Prix	Honda	(Germany) Dario Giuseppetti	13	0	0	0	0	8	26th
2004	125cc	Elit Grand Prix	Honda	(Czech Republic) Václav Bittman	3	0	0	0	0	0	–
2005	125cc	Elit Grand Prix	Honda	(Switzerland) Thomas Lüthi	16	4	8	5	1	242	1st
2006	125cc	Elit – Caffé Latte	Honda	(Switzerland) Thomas Lüthi	16	1	1	0	0	113	8th
2006	125cc	Elit – Caffé Latte	Honda	(Germany) Sandro Cortese	16	0	0	0	0	23	17th
2007	250cc	Emmi – Caffé Latte	Aprilia	(Switzerland) Thomas Lüthi	17	0	0	0	0	133	8th
2007	125cc	Emmi – Caffé Latte	Aprilia	(Germany) Sandro Cortese	17	0	0	0	0	66	14th
2008	250cc	Emmi – Caffé Latte	Aprilia	(Switzerland) Thomas Lüthi	14	0	2	0	0	108	11th
2008	250cc	Auto Kelly – CP	Aprilia	(Czech Republic) Lukáš Pešek	16	0	0	0	0	43	15th
2008	125cc	Emmi – Caffé Latte	Aprilia	(Germany) Sandro Cortese	17	0	0	0	1	141	8th
2009	250cc	Emmi – Caffé Latte	Aprilia	(Switzerland) Thomas Lüthi	16	0	0	0	0	120	7th
2009	250cc	Auto Kelly – CP	Aprilia	(Czech Republic) Lukáš Pešek	16	0	0	0	0	74	15th
2009	250cc	Paddock GP Racing	Aprilia	(Italy) Mattia Pasini	3 (16)	0 (1)	0 (5)	0	0	0 (128)	5th
2010	MotoGP	Interwetten Honda MotoGP	Honda	(Japan) Hiroshi Aoyama	13	0	0	0	0	53	15th
2010	MotoGP	Interwetten Honda MotoGP	Honda	(San Marino) Alex de Angelis	3	0	0	0	0	11	18th
2010	MotoGP	Interwetten Honda MotoGP	Honda	(Japan) Kousuke Akiyoshi	2	0	0	0	0	4	20th
2010	Moto2	Interwetten Moriwaki Moto2	Moriwaki	(Switzerland) Thomas Lüthi	17	0	5	0	2	156	4th
2010	125cc	Interwetten Honda 125	Honda	(Germany) Marcel Schrötter	17	0	0	0	0	27	18th
2011	Moto2	Interwetten Paddock Moto2	Suter	(Switzerland) Thomas Lüthi	17	1	4	1	0	151	5th
2012	Moto2	Interwetten-Paddock	Suter	(Switzerland) Thomas Lüthi	17	1	6	1	3	191	4th
2013	Moto2	Interwetten Paddock Moto2	Suter	(Switzerland) Thomas Lüthi	15	0	6	0	1	155	6th
2013	Moto2	Interwetten Paddock Moto2	Suter	(Spain) Sergio Gadea	1	0	0	0	0	0	–
2013	Moto3	Interwetten Paddock Moto3	Kalex KTM	(Germany) Philipp Öttl	17	0	0	0	1	34	18th
2014	Moto2	Interwetten Paddock Moto2	Suter	(Switzerland) Thomas Lüthi	18	2	4	0	2	194	4th
2014	Moto3	Interwetten Paddock Moto3	Kalex KTM	(Germany) Philipp Öttl	18	0	0	0	0	10	24th
