= Kawasaki KR-1/KR-1S =

Japanese motorcycle

Kawasaki KR-1
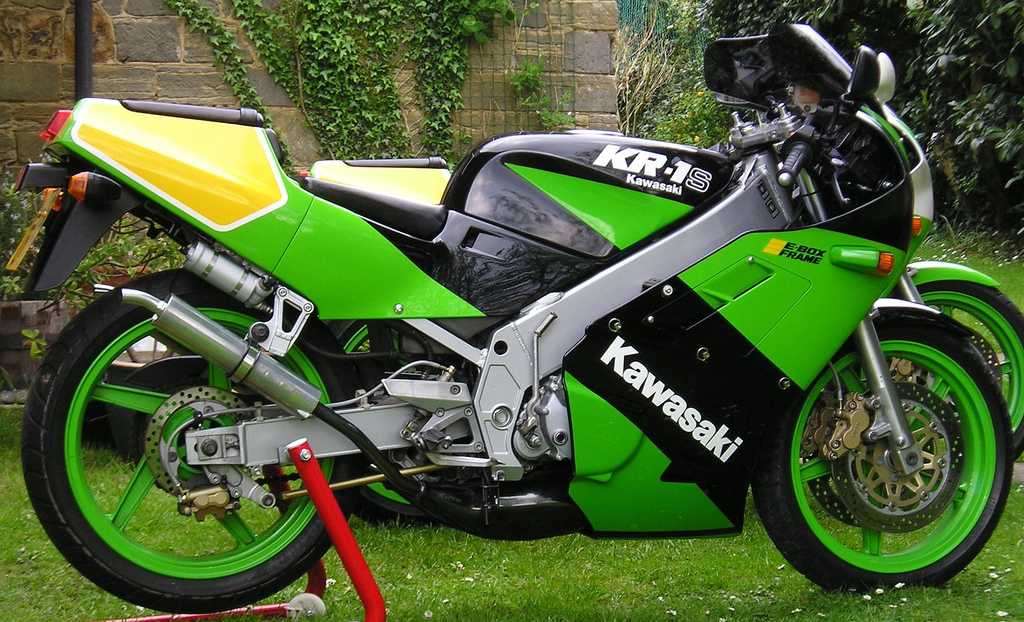
- Manufacturer: Kawasaki Motors
- Parent company: Kawasaki Heavy Industries
- Production: 1988–1992
- Class: Sport bike
- Engine: 249 cc (15.2 cu in) liquid cooled, two stroke parallel 2-cylinder
- Transmission: 6-speed manual
- Wheelbase: 1,360 mm
- Dimensions: L: 2,005 mm W: 690 mm
- Seat height: 750 mm
- Weight: 123 kg (dry)
- Fuel capacity: 16 litres

The Kawasaki KR-1 and KR-1S are road-oriented 249 cc (15.2 cu in) two-stroke sports bikes introduced between 1988 and 1992 by Kawasaki Heavy Industries.

== Model history ==
In 1988, Kawasaki produced a road racing replica motorcycle. The initial models were the B1, B2 series of the KR-1. In 1989, due to the sales success and updated models of competing manufacturers (RGV, NSR, TZR) the KR-1 (B series) evolved into the KR-1S and KR-1R (C, D series). The C1, C2, C3 and D1, D2 models shared the same engine (minor updates) and bodywork (different colour schemes) of the previous KR-1. The S and R models differed slightly in construction of frame, wheels, brakes, and colour schemes.

The engine for all KR-1 models was a two-cylinder, reed valve induction two-stroke motor of 249 cc (15.2 cu in) (somewhat based on the previous Yamaha TZ/TZR configurations). The 180° firing parallel twin configuration featured a crank driven balance shaft. The power delivery was broadened with the use of the Kawasaki Integrated Powervalve System (K.I.P.S.) arrangement shared by other Kawasaki two-strokes.

Total production of all models in KR-1 (B/C/D) series was less than 10,000 units worldwide. The low production numbers has increased collectibility. Worldwide markets for sales were Japan, United Kingdom, Europe, Australia, New Zealand, South Africa (excluded USA due to emissions restrictions). Considered to be least successful of the four Japanese 250 two-stroke race replicas (in terms of sales), the KR-1 series was notable for excellent handling, due to its light weight and steering geometry and least difficult to modify and increase the power output of the engine. Proven to be fastest of all 250 cc models (Suzuki RGV250, Yamaha TZR250, Honda NSR250R, Aprilia RS250) with a top speed of 139 mph (225 km/h) - tested by Performance Bikes Magazine and subsequently at Bonneville Speedway (World's Fastest Production 250 cc).

Unlike the competing TZR, NSR, and RGV ranges, the KR-1 was not inspired by a Kawasaki production race bike. Kawasaki conceived the KR-1 to tap the incredibly competitive quarter-liter two-stroke market; the most important JDM motorcycle class in the late 1980s and early 1990s.

Kawasaki was the first of the Japanese 'big four' to cease production of its road-going 250 two-stroke, when it closed manufacturing the KR-1 in 1992.

They were also the only manufacturer not to eventually produce a V-twin for this class, the KR-1 retaining its parallel twin throughout its short production. The bike never received a major update.

== Public reception ==
The KR-1 was touted as the fastest in class, as well as the easiest to tune, making it a highly popular race bike.

Its dicey, prone to head-shake handling and unreliability were somewhat overlooked or rather fixed.

KR-1s in good condition have become rare, with the KR-1R maybe the rarest of all the road-going 250cc two-strokes.

== Special models ==
The KR-1R (D1, D2 models) was intended to compete with the more racetrack oriented 'SP' 250 two stroke models being produced by competing Japanese factories Honda, Yamaha, and Suzuki. It was sold only within the Japanese domestic market and retailed for some 599,000yen (559,000yen for S model). The 'R' featured larger 35mm carburetors, a close ratio gearbox, improved internal suspension components, different wheel rims, and came only in an Ebony/Green(Black/Green) color scheme - unique to the R. Total production is estimated at 180 units and subsequently they are extremely collectible.

In New Zealand, specifically for production racing, the Sports Production (SP/C3A) variant of the S model was produced. In very limited numbers, (less than 12 units) the SP was the based on a 'S' model and fitted with the 35 mm carburetors from the R model, and modified cylinder porting and compression ratio.

== Standard colour choice ==
Lime Green/Polar White (B1, B2)
Firecracker Red/Polar White (B1, B2)
Ebony/Metallic Zeus Blue (C1)
Ebony/Lime Green (C1, C2)
Lime Green/Blue 24/Pearl Alpine White (C2, C3, C3A)
Firecracker Red/Pearl Gentry Gray (C3)
Lime Green/Pearl Alpine White (C3)
Ebony/Lime Green (D1, D2)

== Specifications ==
=== KR-1 specifications ===
Engine type: 2-stroke, parallel 2-cylinder, liquid-cooled
Frame: Aluminium extruded E-Box frame Electronic variable exhaust valve ( KIPS ) equipment
Total Capacity: 249 cc
Bore × stroke: 56 × 50.6 mm
Maximum output: 55 ps / 10,500 rpm
Maximum torque: 3.7 kg-m / 8,500 rpm
Length: 2,005 mm
Width: 690 mm
Overall height: 1,105 mm
Seat height: 750 mm
Wheelbase: 1,360 mm
Dry weight: 123 kg
Radiator fluid capacity: 1500 cc
Starting system: Kick
Ignition system: CDI
Transmission: 6-speed
Transmission Oil: SE grade 10W30/10W40 850ml
Clutch: Wet multi-plate
Fuel tank capacity: 16 L
Engine oil capacity: 1200 cc 2-stroke oil injection
Caster angle: 24 degrees
Brakes Front: 2POT dia280 mm × 2 disc, 2 pot calipers
Brakes Rear: 200 mm disc,2 pot caliper
Tire size Front: 100/70-17
Tire size Rear: 130/60-18
Carburetor: KEIHIN PWK28Φ (MJ # 135, PJ # 38, JN N68A)
AS 1 +1 / idling back 2: 900 ~ 1100 rpm
Chain: 520, 108 link
Sprocket Front: 14 tooth (varied 13, 14, 15)
Sprocket Rear: 41 tooth (varied)
Spark plug: NGK BR9ES / ND W27ESR (standard heat value)
Battery: 12V 4Ah (YB4L-B)
Headlight: 60/55W
Tail / brake light: 8/27W
Turn indicators: 23W x4
Fork Diameter: Inner fork upright 41Φ
Fork oil: 10W20 355ml/OH 421 ± 4ml at level: 125 ± 2 mm Rear suspension: mono shock with Rizabatanku

=== KR-1S specifications ===
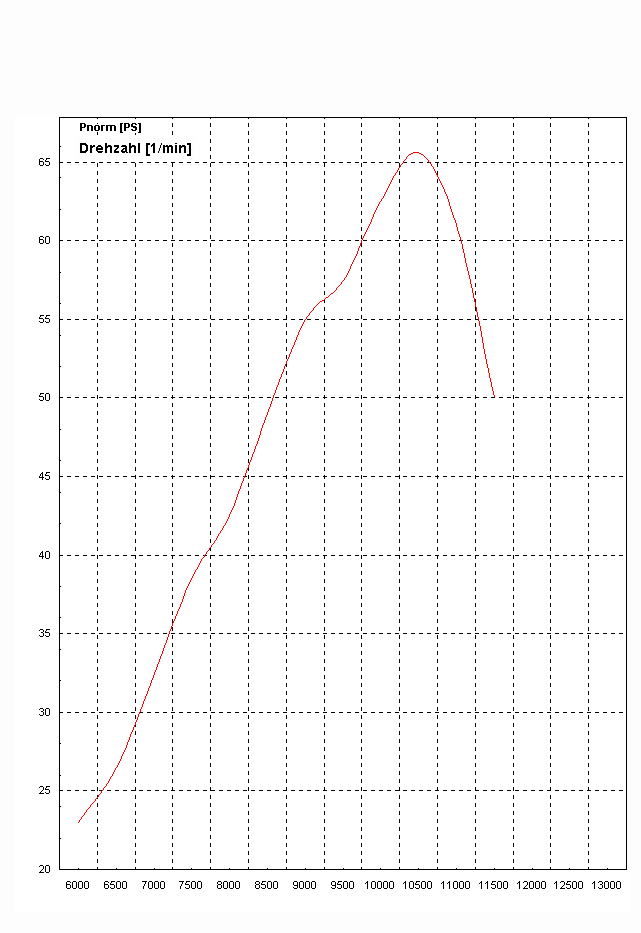
65.6 HP / 10466 rpm 44.4 Nm / 10431 rpm

Engine type: 2-stroke, parallel twin cylinder, liquid-cooled
Frame: Aluminium extruded E-Box frame Electronic variable exhaust valve ( KIPS ) equipment
Total Capacity: 249 cc
Bore × stroke: 56 × 50.6 mm
Maximum output: 65 ps / 10,500 rpm
Maximum torque: 3.7 kg-m / 8,500 rpm
Length: 2,005 mm
Width: 695 mm
Overall height: 1,105 mm
Seat height: 755 mm
Wheelbase: 1,370 mm
Dry weight: 131 kg
Engine type: 2-stroke, parallel twin cylinder, liquid-cooled
Water radiator: 1500 cc
Starting system: Kick
Ignition system: CDI
Transmission: 6-speed
Clutch: Wet multi-plate
Transmission Oil: SE grade 10W30/10W40 850ml
Fuel tank capacity: 16 L
Engine oil capacity: 1200 cc
Caster angle: 24 degrees
Brakes Front: 4POT dia300 mm × 2 disc, 4 pot calipers
Brakes Rear: 200 mm disc, 2 pot caliper
Tire size Front: 110/70-17
Tire size Rear: 140/60-18
Carburetor: Keihin Pwk28Φ
MJ # 140, PJ # 38, JN N68AAS 1 +1 / idling back 2: 1100 ~ 1300 rpm Chain: 520/108L
Sprocket
F: Ding 15
R: 40th
Spark plug: NGK Br10Es / DENSO W31Esr (standard heat value) Battery: 12V 4Ah (YB4L-B)
Headlight: 60/55W
Tail / brake light: 8/27W
Winker: 23W x4
Fork Diameter: Inner fork upright 41Φ
Fork oil: 10W20 335ml ± 4ml / OH 396 ± 4ml at level: 150 ± 2 mm
Fokuajasuta: standard 20 mm projection
Rear suspension: 21 stage with partial pressure side damping Rizabatanku / mono shock attenuation extensor surfaces of four stages Standard position rear shock damping adjustment: 09 steps back from the best partial pressure side / side stretch II Gas pressure shock: 10 kg/cm ²

=== KR-1R specifications ===
see KR-1S above Carburetor: Keihin Pwk35
[MJ # 145, PJ # 40, JN R1372J]
Gearbox: 6-speed, CLOSE RATIO
