= Gilera GFR 250 =

- Manufacturer: Gilera
- Production: 1992–1993
- Engine: 249 cc (15.2 cu in) two-stroke engine 75° V2
- Bore / stroke: 56 mm × 50.7 mm (2.20 in × 2.00 in)
- Power: 86.5 hp (64.5 kW) @ 12,750 rpm (1992); 94 hp (70 kW) @ 12,800 rpm (1993)
- Transmission: 6-speed, Chain
- Frame type: Double-inclined beam, in aluminum alloy
- Suspension: Fully-adjustable shock absorber with titanium spring
- Brakes: Dual discs, one 290 mm steel disc and one 272 mm carbon disc with Brembo 4-piston calipers of different diameters (front); Single 190 mm carbon steel disc with Brembo 2-piston caliper (rear)
- Tires: 120/60 17" (front); 150/61 17" (rear) on Marchesini rims 3.50-17 (front); 5.50-17 (rear)
- Wheelbase: 1,320 mm (52 in)
- Weight: 95 kg (209 lb) (dry)
- Fuel capacity: 23 L (5.1 imp gal; 6.1 US gal)

The Gilera GFR 250 (which stands for Gilera Formula Racing) is a racing motorcycle designed, developed and built by Gilera which made its debut in the 250cc class of the world championship in 1992.

== See also ==
- Aprilia RS250
- Honda NSR250
- Honda RS250R
- KTM 250 FRR
- Suzuki RGV250
- Aprilia RSV 250
- Kawasaki KR250
- Yamaha YZR 250
