= KTM 250 FRR =

Racing motorcycle

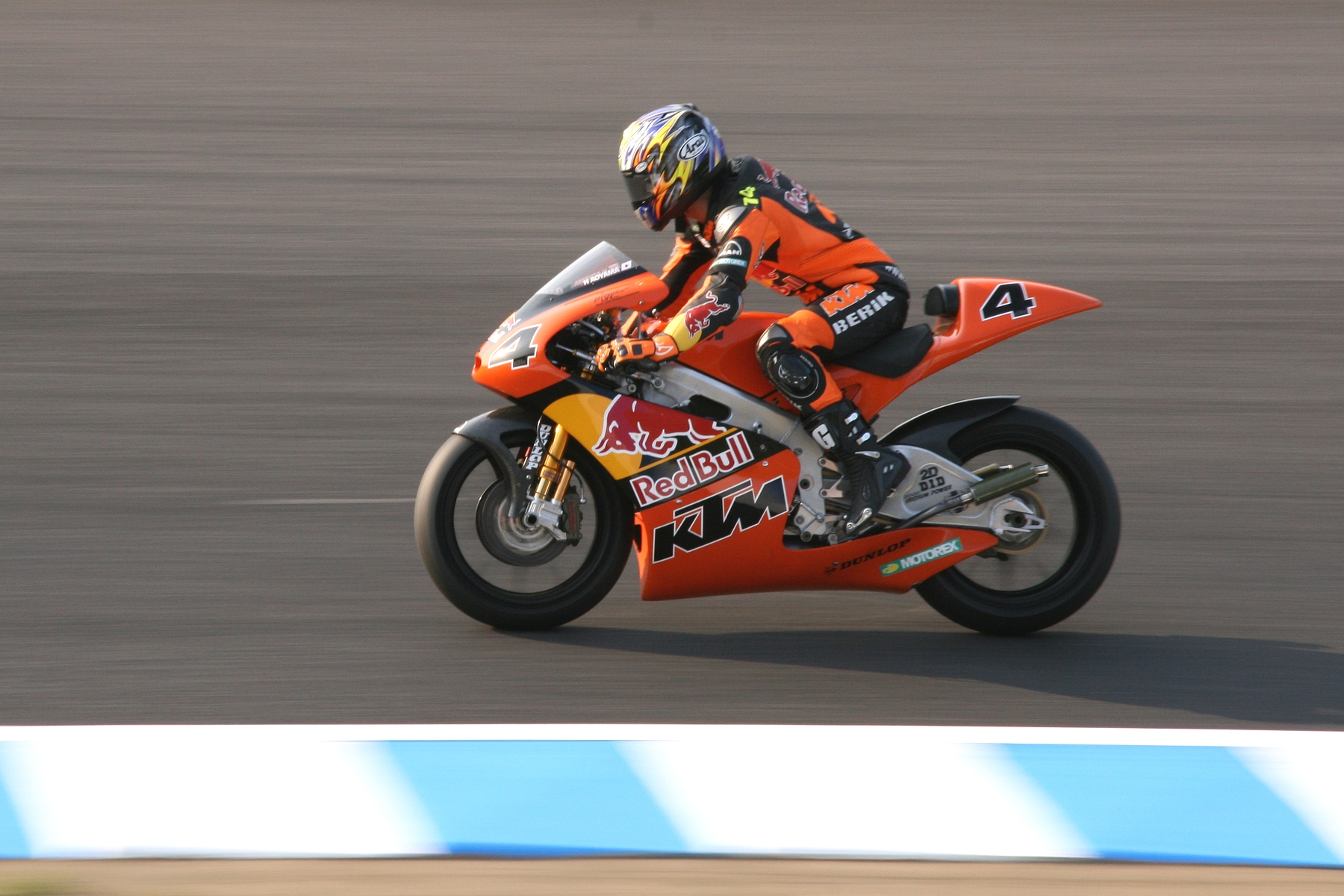
- Hiroshi Aoyama, riding the KTM 250 FRR at the 2007 Japanese Grand Prix
- Manufacturer: KTM
- Production: 2005–2008
- Successor: KTM RC Moto2 (2017–2019)
- Class: 250 cc
- Engine: 249.6 cc (15.23 cu in) two-stroke twin-cylinder inline
- Bore / stroke: 54 mm × 54.5 mm (2.13 in × 2.15 in)
- Compression ratio: 9:1
- Power: 110 hp (82 kW) @ 13,000 rpm
- Transmission: Chain
- Weight: 101 kg (dry)
- Fuel capacity: About 23 Liters
- Related: KTM 125 FRR

The KTM 250 FRR was a racing motorcycle made by KTM, which was used in the 250cc class of Grand Prix motorcycle racing from 2005 until 2008.

== History ==
The bike was created as a 250cc variant to the already existing KTM 125 FRR that KTM participated with in the 125cc. The plans to create this bike also came when the company had plans to participate with a Factory team in the 250cc class in 2005. The bike was equipped with a two-cylinder engine with the arrangement of the front-facing cylinders.

== Season progress ==
=== 2005 ===
The bike and team debuted relatively late in the year with Australian rider Anthony West.

On its debut, West shocked many when he scored an impressive second place in a wet British grand prix, fighting for the lead after then-leader Hiroshi Aoyama crashed out with fifteen laps to go. However, the results after were lacklustre and West was not able to score any more podiums for the remainder of the season.

Overall, the team scored 30 points, getting a best-place finish of second, and finished third in the constructors championship.

=== 2006 ===
The next season, the team expanded to two riders as West departed as the team brought on Hiroshi Aoyama and Manuel Poggiali.

The team initially scored decent point results, but Aoyama impressed when he won KTM's first 250cc race at only the third round of the season in Turkey, fighting with Alex de Angelis and Héctor Barberá on the flat-out charge to the final chicane on the last lap. He continued to impress by finishing third at the next race in China and repeated the feat in Great Britain.

Aoyama's good form continued on after the summer break. He narrowly snatched second from Andrea Dovizioso at the Czech round and finished third once more in Australia. Aoyama then scored an emotional home victory in Japan, picking up the fastest lap also. In Portugal, Aoyama narrowly missed out on the win, finishing second 0.015 seconds behind Andrea Dovizioso. At the final race in Valencia, Aoyama took the first and last pole of the season on Saturday, but crashed out of the race on Sunday, causing him to end fourth in the drivers championship. Compared to Hiroshi Aoyama, Manuel Poggiali frequently struggled on the bike and failed to score any podiums of victories, instead only scoring a decent haul of points this season.

Overall, the team scored 205 points, seven podiums - two of which were victories - and finished third in the constructors championship.

=== 2007 ===
After the impressive 2006 season, KTM continued to impress in 2007. Poggiali left the team and Kallio moved up from the 125cc to the 250cc KTM team.

Compared to last year, the team struggled more in the first few races, initially only scoring point finishes. The breakthrough came when Aoyama scored KTM's first podium of the season in Great Britain in the form of third. However, it was in Germany where the team scored its first 1-2 finish, Aoyama finishing ahead of Kallio, the latter scoring KTM's first pole of the season on Saturday.

After the summer break, Kallio continued to impress by finishing in third place at the Czech round. In San Marino however, it was Aoyama who picked up another KTM podium after he finished second behind Jorge Lorenzo. After a double retirement in Portugal, Kallio took his first win of the year as a rookie in Japan. Aoyama then took a pole-win at the penultimate race in Malaysia, Kallio finishing second on Saturday. At the final race of the season in Valencia, it was Kallio who took the spoils on Saturday and Sunday, taking the pole on Saturday and winning the race on Sunday.

Overall, the team scored 226 points, eight podiums - four of which were victories - and finished third in the constructors championship.

=== 2008 ===
This was the final year for the team and the bike, as KTM had announced their withdrawal from the 250cc at the end of this season. The rider line-up was expanded upon as Julián Simón joined the Repsol KTM team.

In the team's final year, the team continued to do well. Mika Kallio scored a third-place finish at the opening round in Qatar and improved upon his efforts at the next round in Spain by scoring the team's first victory of the season, profiting from a last-lap collision between Marco Simoncelli and Álvaro Bautista. Kallio then took another third place when he narrowly missed out on second in Portugal, then took another win in China, as well as fastest lap, with Aoyama finishing second - his first podium of the season and KTM's first and only 1-2 finish of the year. After a few lacklustre races, Kallio's third victory arrived in Great Britain, beating Simoncelli by 0.353 seconds. Kallio then continued to impress, but failed to score any podiums until he finished third in Australia. Aoyama scored KTM's final pole position on Saturday and second place podium finish at the Malaysian round, before the team's permanent departure from the 250cc class.

Overall, the team scored 245 points, eight podiums - three of which were victories - and finished third in the constructors championship.

== Specifications ==
KTM 250 FRR Specifications (2008)
Engine
Engine type:	Twin-cylinder, 2-stroke
Displacement:	249.6 cm^{3} (Bore 54 x Stroke 54.5 mm)
Ignition:	Digital CDI with battery
Fuel System:	
Fuel:	
Lubricants:	
Lubrication system:	
Data recording:	
Maximum power:	About 110 hp at 13.000 rpm
Maximum speed:	
Exhaust:	
Transmission
Type:	6-speed removable sequential (always in gear)
Primary drive:	Gear
Clutch:	Dry multi-disc
Final drive:	Chain
Chassis and running gear
Frame type:	Double inclined beam, in aluminum
Front suspension:	Fully adjustable Öhlins upside down fork
Rear suspension:	Fully adjustable Öhlins shock absorber
Front/rear wheels:	Marchesini rims
Front/rear tyres:	Front: 17" / Rear: 17" Dunlop tyres
Front brake:	Single carbon steel disc with Brembo caliper with 4 differentiated diameter pistons
Rear brake:	Single disc with Brembo 2-piston caliper
Weight:	101 kg/ 223 lbs
Fuel capacity:	About 23 Liters

== See also ==
- Honda NSR250
- Honda RS250R
- Gilera GFR 250
- Aprilia RSV 250
- Suzuki RGV250
- Yamaha YZR 250
