= Honda MT125R =

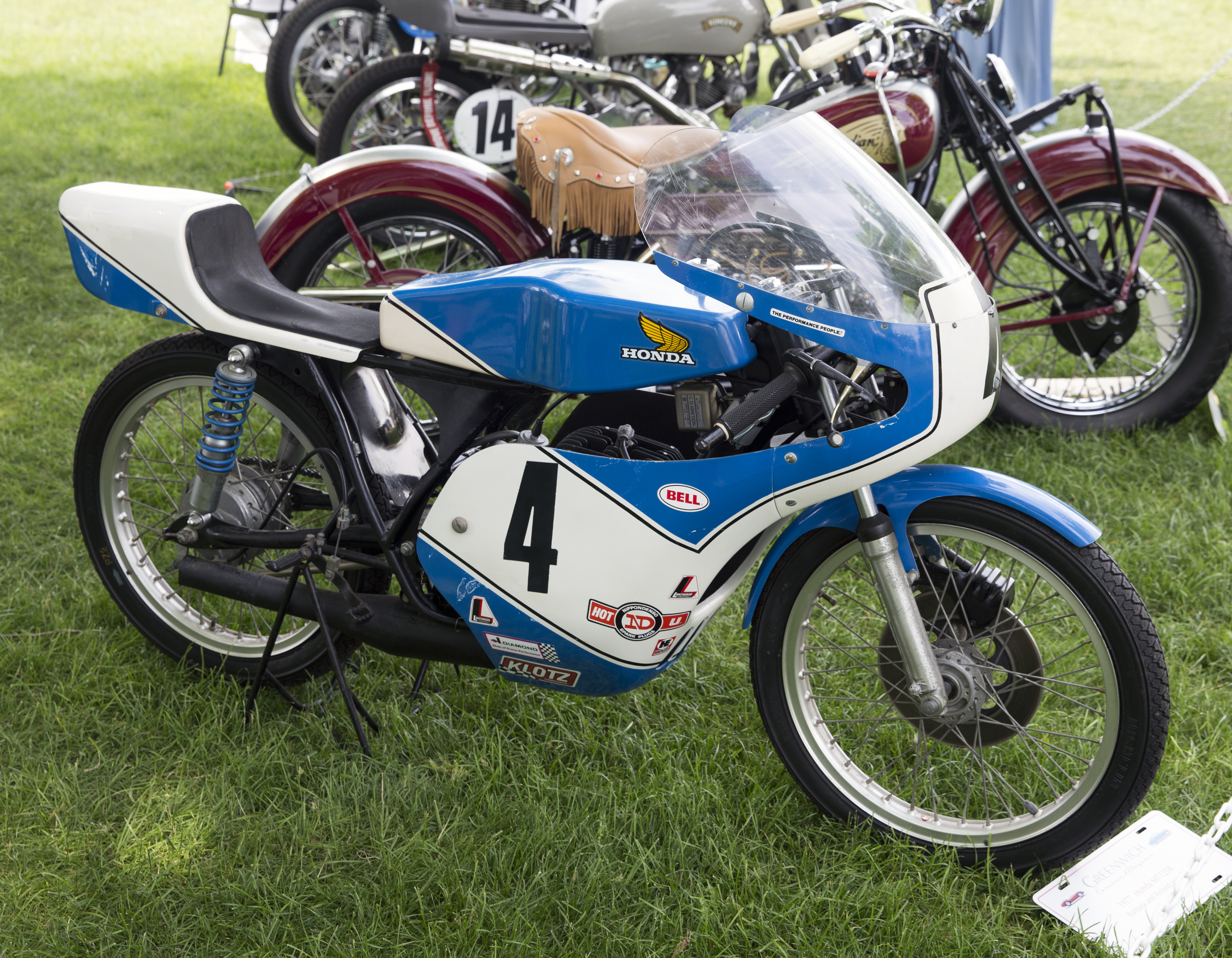
- Manufacturer: Honda Racing Service Center
- Production: 1976–1979
- Predecessor: Honda CR93; Honda RC149
- Successor: Honda RS125R
- Engine: 124.9 cc (7.62 cu in) two-stroke single
- Bore / stroke: 56 mm × 50.7 mm (2.20 in × 2.00 in)
- Power: 25bhp@10,500rpm
- Torque: 12.2ftlb@10,500rpm

The Honda MT125R was a production Grand Prix motorcycle racing roadracer designed for closed-course competition roadracing. It was produced by Honda Racing Service Center (RSC) and made available to the general public. It was also marketed for the U.S. market in the years 1977–1978 through the American Honda Motorcycle dealer network and in Canada through Canadian Honda Motors Ltd., (later Honda Canada Inc.)

For many champion motorcycle roadracers, the road to the top started on a small engine capacity two-cycle motorcycle. Top roadracers like Randy Mamola got their start on a 125 cc GP racer. Others like Ángel Nieto spent their entire careers racing in the 50 cc, 80 cc and 125 cc classes.

== 1977 - MT125R ==
Product code: 325

=== Serial number ranges ===
- Frame: MT125R2F-1001~ (MT125R)
- Engine: MT125R2E-1001~
- Frame: MT125R2F-1081~ (MT125RII)
- Engine: MT125R2E-1081~

=== Features ===
- Engine - 123 cc 2-stroke air-cooled single-cylinder, 6-speed, power 26HP
- Chassis - fiberglass tank, fairing, front fender and seat cowl
- Other - tachometer, mechanical front disc brake, and rear cable operated drum brake

== 1978 - MT125R ==
Product code: 325

=== Serial number ranges ===
- Frame: MT125R2F-1591~
- Engine: MT125R2E-1591~

=== Features ===
- Engine - 123 cc 2-stroke air-cooled single-cylinder, 6-speed, (1978 change), power 28 (1978 change)

Expansion chamber redesigned

- Chassis - fiberglass tank, fairing, fender and seat cowl
- Other - tachometer, (1978 change) - hydraulic front disc brake, rear cable operated drum brake

== Overview ==
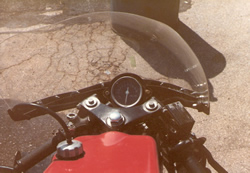

Good examples of this model will have the original "RSC" tachometer, factory prop stand which lifts at the footrests, owners/service manual.

A liquid-cooled kit was available from RSC which included: liquid-cooled cylinder, cylinder head, water pump, hoses, hardware, temperature gauge and radiator. This option is fairly rare.

The MT125R shares many parts with the CR125 engine. The CR versions were motocross bikes with similar specifications. One notable difference was the shift pattern on the transmission. Both had the standard 1 down 5 up pattern. On MT125R versions the shift lever was flipped over rearward to accommodate the rearset footpegs of the MT roadracer. To maintain the widely used 1 down 5 up pattern a different shift linkage was used behind the engine cover.

MT125Rs used a different cylinder than the CR versions when they were originally produced. At some point the part numbers were superseded by part numbers shared by both the MT125R and the CR125m Elsinore models.

Owners in search of parts after production stopped often substituted complete CR125M motors for their MT125R motors. The first clue is a reversed shift pattern from a stock MT125R (1 up 5 down).

== Performance and riding the MT125R ==
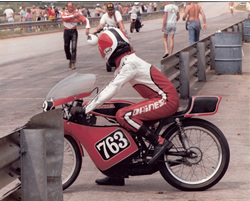

Dyno test of Honda MT125 R-3

| RPM | Standard HP | Standard torque (lb/ft) | Standard speed (6th gear) | Modified speed (6th gear) | Modified HP | Modified torque (lb/ft) |
|---|---|---|---|---|---|---|
| 8500 | 16.67 | 10.3 | 88 | 88 | 14.16 | 8.75 |
| 9000 | 18.21 | 10.3 | 93 | 93 | 17.03 | 9.94 |
| 9500 | 19.9 | 11.0 | 98 | 98 | 19.54 | 10.80 |
| 10000 | 21.95 | 11.53 | 103 | 103 | 22.37 | 11.75 |
| 10500 | 24.39 | 12.20 | 108 | 108 | 25.01 | 12.51 |
| 11000 | 10.05 | 4.80 | 114 | 114 | 18.64 | 8.90 |
| 11250 | n/a | n/a | n/a | 116 | 17.07 | 6.57 |
| 11500 | n/a | n/a | n/a | 119 | 8.58 | 3.92 |

As with any 125 cc roadracer, it was best suited for smaller riders. After bump starting the engine a good start required patience and finesse. To characterize the personality of the 125 cc two-stroke look at the RSC factory tachometer. It did not move or display engine rpm until 5,000 rpm and registered up to 14,000 rpm. With the tall gearing needed for top speed performance it would not pull its own weight until the tachometer was showing at least 9,000 rpm. The engine was in its peak powerband or, "on the pipe" from just below 10,000 rpm and went out of the powerband a little past 11,000 (depending on jetting and modifications).

To achieve a good start the rider needed to hold the throttle wide open and begin feathering the clutch as fast as possible while keeping the rpm between 10,000 and 11,000 rpm. If the tachometer dropped below 10,000 RPMs the rider needed to pull the clutch in, rev the motor and begin the process again. If the clutch was engaged too quickly the engine could "bog" or even stall while the rest of the starting field rode away. Even with the lightest of riders, the MT125R required slipping the clutch for 40 or more feet. The rewards for a successful launch were full throttle with quick shifts (approximately every 1,000 rpm) up through the six gears. At the end of sixth gear the hard-working 123 cc engine would be pulling along a straight stretch between 110 and 120 mph.
