= Hiroshi Aoyama =

Japanese motorcycle racer

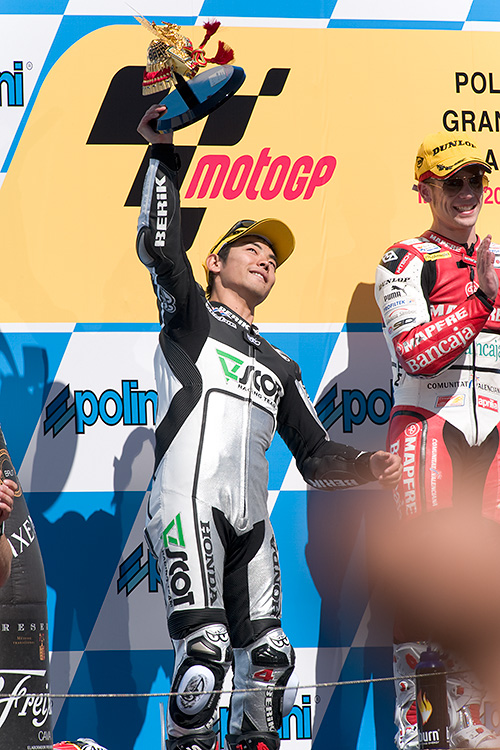
- Aoyama at the 2009 Japanese Grand Prix
- Nationality: Japanese
- Born: October 25, 1981 (age 45); Ichihara, Chiba, Japan
- Website: hiro-aoyama.com
Motorcycle racing career statistics
MotoGP World Championship
Active years	2010–2017
Manufacturers	Honda, BQR, FTR
Championships	0
2017 championship position	30th (0 pts)
Starts / Wins / Podiums / Poles / F. laps / Points; 70 / 0 / 0 / 0 / 0 / 241
250cc World Championship
Active years	2000–2009
Manufacturers	Honda, KTM
Championships	1 (2009)
2009 championship position	1st (261 pts)
Starts / Wins / Podiums / Poles / F. laps / Points; 104 / 9 / 27 / 8 / 11 / 1112
Superbike World Championship
Active years	2012
Manufacturers	Honda
Championships	0
2012 championship position	18th (61.5 pts)
Starts / Wins / Podiums / Poles / F. laps / Points; 27 / 0 / 0 / 0 / 0 / 61.5

Hiroshi Aoyama (青山 博一, Aoyama Hiroshi; born October 25, 1981) is a Japanese retired Grand Prix motorcycle road racer, and current team principal of Honda Team Asia. Aoyama is best known for winning the 2009 250cc World Championship title. He is the older brother of former 250cc and World Superbike rider, Shuhei Aoyama.

In his six seasons in the 250cc World Championship, Aoyama raced Honda and KTM machinery in an Aprilia-dominated class. He took nine victories and never finished lower than seventh overall. By winning the 2009 250cc World Championship, Aoyama become the last winner of this class before its replacement by the Moto2 class in 2010. In 2010, he moved up to the premier class with Interwetten Racing. He stopped competing in MotoGP after the 2014 season and took on the role of HRC test rider and advisor to riders in the Shell Advance Asia Talent Cup.

== Career ==
=== Early career ===
Born in Ichihara, Chiba, Aoyama first raced in MiniMoto at the age of four, racing against Yuki Takahashi, who he has raced against for most of his career. In 2008, he referred to Takahashi as a "respected rival".

Aoyama rode in the All-Japan Road Racing Championship until 2003, when he won the 250cc championship with Honda. He also rode a couple of events as wildcard rider in the Grand Prix World Championships, finishing second in the 2003 Japanese Grand Prix at Suzuka.

=== 250cc & MotoGP World Championship ===
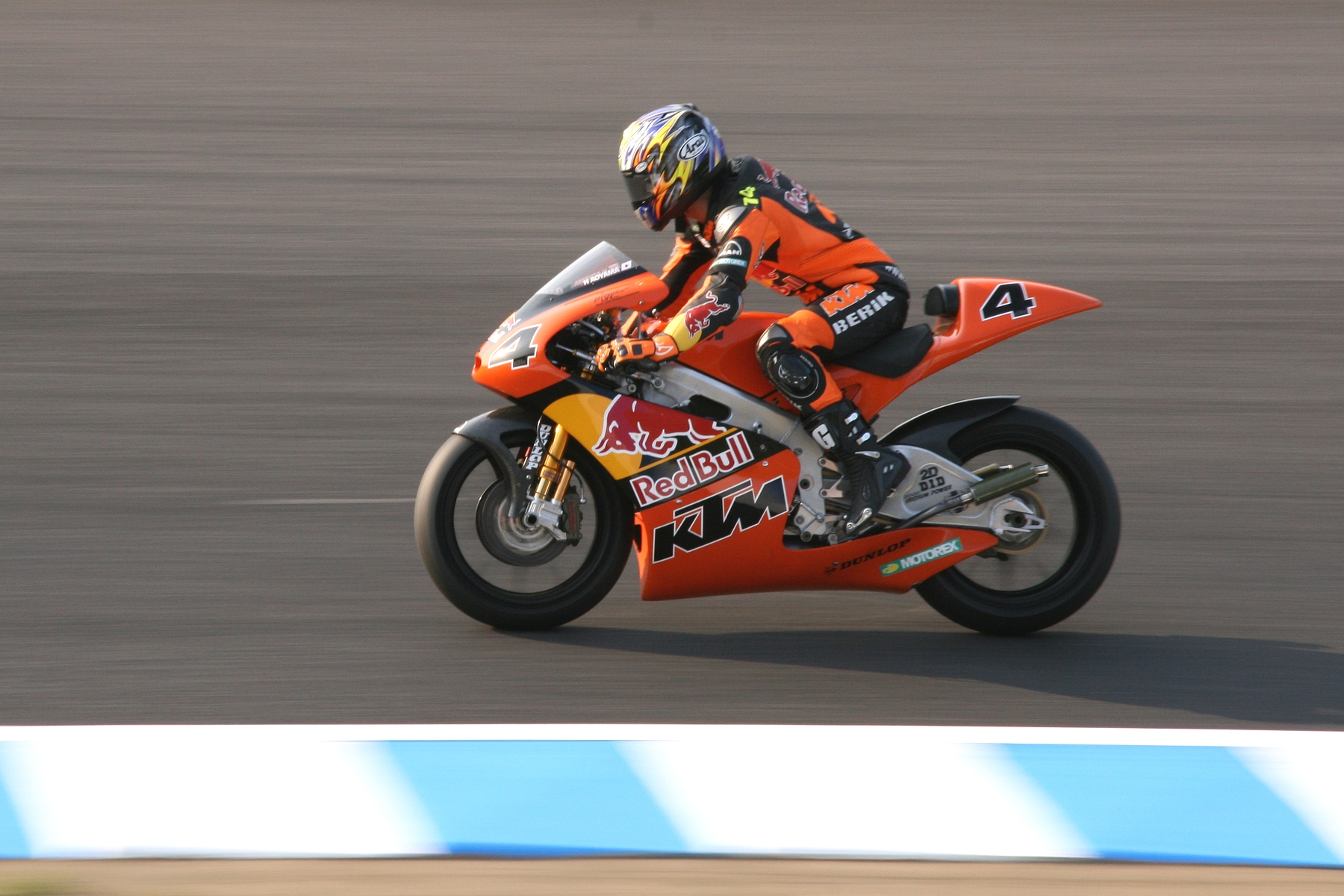
Aoyama, riding a KTM, at the 2007 Japanese Grand Prix

In 2004, Aoyama joined the 250cc World Championship full-time, still racing for Honda. His debut season gave him two third places and sixth place in the championship. In the following year, he scored his maiden victory in his home race at Motegi and finished the championship in fourth place.

However, Aoyama was not able to stay on at Honda, so he moved to KTM for 2006 season. He brought them victories in Istanbul and Motegi, the first two for the manufacturer in the class. For the second year in row, he was fourth in overall standings.

Aoyama ended the 2007 season in sixth place in the 250 championship with victories in Germany and Malaysia. He remained with KTM for the 2008 season and finished the season in seventh place with two second-place finishes.

After KTM's withdrawal from 250cc class, Aoyama returned to Honda with Team Scot replacing his rival Yuki Takahashi who briefly moved up to MotoGP class. The 2009 season went well as he scored four wins, three second places and finished every other race in the points. At the last race of the season, Aoyama became the world champion.

Aoyama stepped up to MotoGP in 2010 on board the Emmi-Caffè Latte Team Honda RC212V. In initial testing the team (which is itself new to MotoGP) opted not to use the electronic rider aids, despite the bikes being designed around them. The team's technical director Tom Jojic explained that he wanted Aoyama to experience the bike's true nature, and believes that he is good enough to be competitive on it. His season was wrecked by a fractured vertebra sustained in a practice crash at Silverstone, eliminating him for much of the season.

Aoyama was a consistent race finisher in 2011, mainly finishing in the bottom end of the top-ten, but finished fourth in the Spanish Grand Prix. Aoyama also replaced Dani Pedrosa on the factory-spec Repsol Honda bike for the Dutch TT in Assen, after Pedrosa's injury at the French Grand Prix. Aoyama moved to World Superbikes for the 2012 season, joining Jonathan Rea at Castrol Honda.

== Career statistics ==
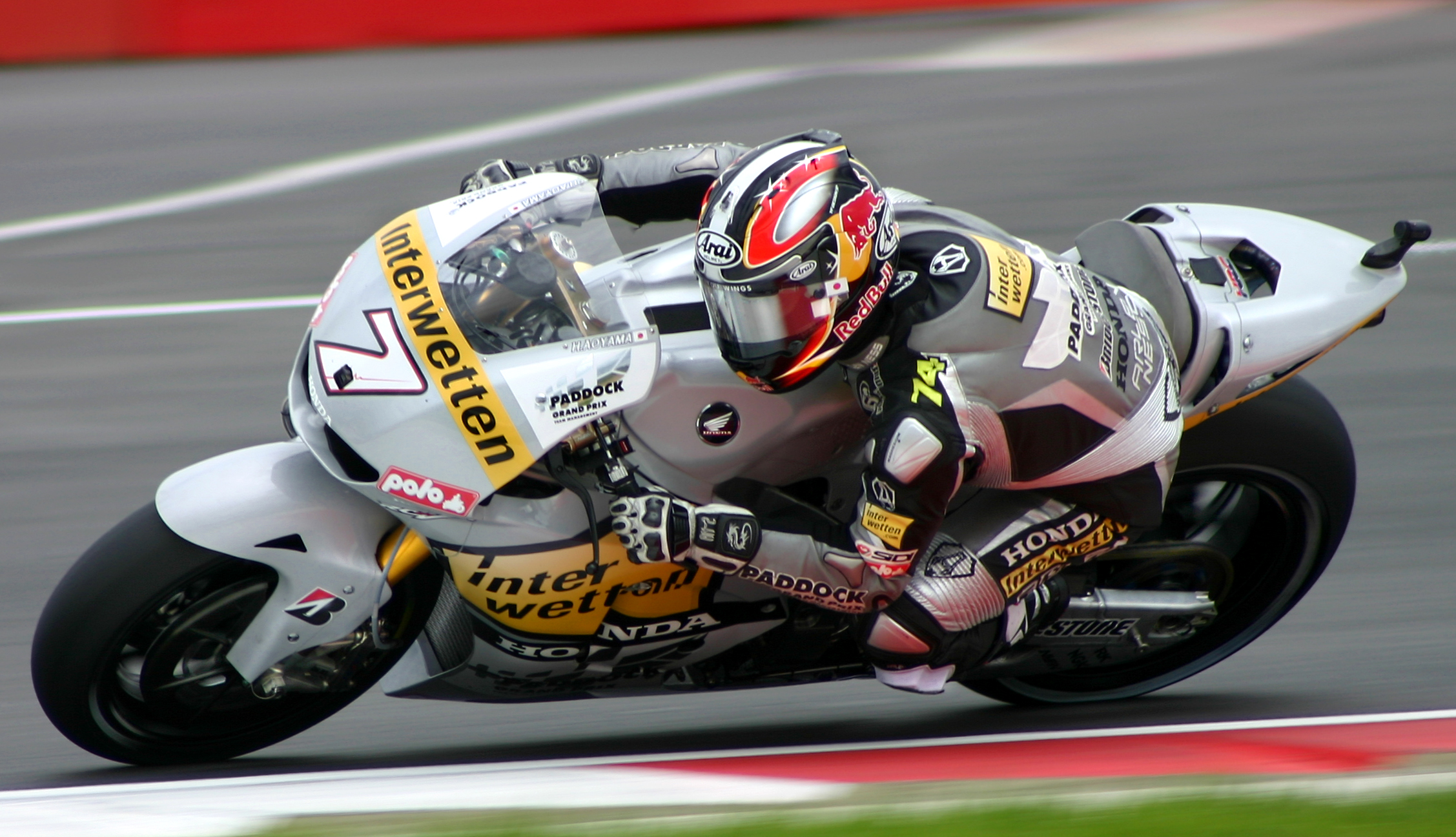
Aoyama at the 2010 British Grand Prix

=== Grand Prix motorcycle racing ===
==== By season ====
Season	Class	Motorcycle	Team	Race	Win	Podium	Pole	FLap	Pts	Plcd	WCh
2000	250cc	Honda NSR250	Team Harc-Pro	1	0	0	0	0	8	28th	–
2001	250cc	Honda NSR250	Team Harc-Pro	2	0	0	0	0	3	28th	–
2002	250cc	Honda NSR250	Team Harc-Pro	2	0	0	0	0	9	27th	–
2003	250cc	Honda NSR250	Team Harc-Pro	2	0	1	1	1	31	15th	–
2004	250cc	Honda RS250RW	Telefónica Movistar Honda 250cc	16	0	2	0	0	128	6th	–
2005	250cc	Honda RS250RW	Telefónica Movistar Honda 250cc	16	1	4	2	0	180	4th	–
2006	250cc	KTM 250 FRR	Red Bull KTM 250	16	2	7	1	4	193	4th	–
2007	250cc	KTM 250 FRR	Red Bull KTM 250	17	2	4	1	2	160	6th	–
2008	250cc	KTM 250 FRR	Red Bull KTM 250	16	0	2	1	0	139	7th	–
2009	250cc	Honda RS250RW	Scot Racing Team 250cc	16	4	7	2	4	261	**1st**	1
2010	MotoGP	Honda RC212V	Interwetten Honda MotoGP	12	0	0	0	0	53	15th	–
2011	MotoGP	Honda RC212V	San Carlo Honda Gresini	17	0	0	0	0	98	10th	–
2011	MotoGP	Honda RC212V	Repsol Honda Team	17	0	0	0	0	98	10th	–
2012	MotoGP	BQR	Avintia Blusens	1	0	0	0	0	3	25th	–
2013	MotoGP	FTR MGP13	Avintia Blusens	16	0	0	0	0	13	20th	–
2014	MotoGP	Honda RCV1000R	Drive M7 Aspar	18	0	0	0	0	68	14th	–
2015	MotoGP	Honda RC213V	Repsol Honda Team	4	0	0	0	0	5	25th	–
2015	MotoGP	Honda RC213V-RS	AB Motoracing	4	0	0	0	0	5	25th	–
2016	MotoGP	Honda RC213V	Repsol Honda Team	2	0	0	0	0	1	25th	–
2017	MotoGP	Honda RC213V	EG 0,0 Marc VDS	1	0	0	0	0	0	30th	–
Total				**175**	**9**	**27**	**8**	**11**	**1353**		**1**

==== By class ====
Class	Seasons	1st GP	1st Pod	1st Win	Race	Win	Podiums	Pole	FLap	Pts	WChmp
250cc	2000–2009	2000 Pacific	2003 Japan	2005 Japan	104	9	27	8	11	1112	1
MotoGP	2010–2017	2010 Qatar			71	0	0	0	0	241	0
Total	2000–2017				**175**	**9**	**27**	**8**	**11**	**1353**	**1**

==== Races by year ====
(key) (Races in bold indicate pole position, races in italics indicate fastest lap)

Year	Class	Bike	1	2	3	4	5	6	7	8	9	10	11	12	13	14	15	16	17	18	Pos	Pts
2000	250cc	Honda	RSA	MAL	JPN	SPA	FRA	ITA	CAT	NED	GBR	GER	CZE	POR	VAL	BRA	PAC; 8	AUS			28th	8
2001	250cc	Honda	JPN; 13	RSA	SPA	FRA	ITA	CAT	NED	GBR	GER	CZE	POR	VAL	PAC; 21	AUS	MAL	BRA			28th	3
2002	250cc	Honda	JPN; 12	RSA	SPA	FRA	ITA	CAT	NED	GBR	GER	CZE	POR	BRA	PAC; 11	MAL	AUS	VAL			27th	9
2003	250cc	Honda	**JPN**; 2	RSA	SPA	FRA	ITA	CAT	NED	GBR	GER	CZE	POR	BRA	PAC; 5	MAL	AUS	VAL			15th	31
2004	250cc	Honda	RSA; 11	SPA; Ret	FRA; 4	ITA; 9	CAT; 6	NED; 10	BRA; 6	GER; 4	GBR; 9	CZE; 7	POR; 9	JPN; 3	QAT; 3	MAL; Ret	AUS; 7	VAL; DSQ			6th	128
2005	250cc	Honda	SPA; Ret	POR; 6	CHN; 3	FRA; 6	ITA; 7	CAT; 4	NED; 4	GBR; Ret	GER; 3	CZE; 5	**JPN**; 1	**MAL**; 5	QAT; 6	AUS; 6	TUR; 3	VAL; 6			4th	180
2006	250cc	KTM	SPA; 6	QAT; 5	TUR; 1	CHN; 3	FRA; 4	ITA; Ret	CAT; 6	NED; 9	GBR; 3	GER; 8	CZE; 3	MAL; Ret	AUS; 3	JPN; 1	POR; 2	**VAL**; Ret			4th	193
2007	250cc	KTM	QAT; Ret	SPA; 6	TUR; Ret	CHN; 9	FRA; Ret	ITA; 21	CAT; 7	GBR; 3	NED; 5	GER; 1	CZE; 6	RSM; 2	POR; Ret	JPN; 8	AUS; 4	**MAL**; 1	VAL; 10		6th	160
2008	250cc	KTM	QAT; 16	SPA; 4	POR; 5	CHN; 2	FRA; 7	ITA; 8	CAT; 7	GBR; 6	NED; 6	GER; 8	CZE; 13	RSM; Ret	INP; C	JPN; 9	AUS; Ret	**MAL**; 2	VAL; 5		7th	139
2009	250cc	Honda	QAT; 4	JPN; 2	SPA; 1	FRA; 8	ITA; 6	CAT; 2	NED; 1	GER; 4	GBR; 1	CZE; 4	INP; 2	**RSM**; 4	POR; 4	AUS; 7	**MAL**; 1	VAL; 7			**1st**	**261**
2010	MotoGP	Honda	QAT; 10	SPA; 14	FRA; 11	ITA; 11	GBR; DNS	NED	CAT	GER	USA	CZE	INP; 12	RSM; 12	ARA; 13	JPN; 10	MAL; 7	AUS; 13	POR; 12	VAL; 14	15th	53
2011	MotoGP	Honda	QAT; 10	SPA; 4	POR; 7	FRA; 8	CAT; Ret	GBR; 9	NED; 8	ITA; 11	GER; 15	USA; 10	CZE; 9	INP; 9	RSM; 11	ARA; 11	JPN; 9	AUS; Ret	MAL; C	VAL; 12	10th	98
2012	MotoGP	BQR	QAT	SPA	POR	FRA	CAT	GBR	NED	GER	ITA	USA	INP	CZE	RSM	ARA	JPN	MAL	AUS	VAL; 13	25th	3
2013	MotoGP	FTR	QAT; 15	AME; 17	SPA; 18	FRA; 19	ITA; Ret	CAT; WD	NED	GER; 17	USA; 16	INP; 15	CZE; 14	GBR; 18	RSM; 14	ARA; 14	MAL; 11	AUS; 20	JPN; 17	VAL; 16	20th	13
2014	MotoGP	Honda	QAT; 11	AME; 12	ARG; 10	SPA; 12	FRA; 14	ITA; 14	CAT; 15	NED; 16	GER; 12	INP; 10	CZE; 13	GBR; 14	RSM; 12	ARA; 8	JPN; 13	AUS; 8	MAL; 11	VAL; 15	14th	68
2015	MotoGP	Honda	QAT	AME; 11	ARG; Ret	SPA; Ret	FRA	ITA	CAT	NED	GER; Ret	INP	CZE	GBR	RSM	ARA	JPN	AUS	MAL	VAL	25th	5
2016	MotoGP	Honda	QAT	ARG	AME	SPA	FRA	ITA	CAT	NED	GER	AUT	CZE	GBR	RSM	ARA	JPN; 15	AUS	MAL; 16	VAL	25th	1
2017	MotoGP	Honda	QAT	ARG	AME	SPA	FRA	ITA	CAT	NED	GER	CZE	AUT	GBR	RSM	ARA	JPN; 18	AUS	MAL	VAL	30th	0

=== Superbike World Championship ===
==== By season ====
Season	Motorcycle	Team	Race	Win	Podium	Pole	FLap	Pts	Plcd
2012	Honda CBR1000RR	Honda World Superbike Team	27	0	0	0	0	61.5	18th
Total			**27**	**0**	**0**	**0**	**0**	**61.5**	

==== Races by year ====
(key) (Races in bold indicate pole position, races in italics indicate fastest lap)

Year	Bike	1		2		3		4		5		6		7		8		9		10		11		12		13		14		Pos	Pts
Year	Bike	R1	R2	R1	R2	R1	R2	R1	R2	R1	R2	R1	R2	R1	R2	R1	R2	R1	R2	R1	R2	R1	R2	R1	R2	R1	R2	R1	R2	Pos	Pts
2012	Honda	AUS; 8	AUS; 9	ITA; 18	ITA; Ret	NED; 12	NED; 13	ITA; C	ITA; 11	EUR; 17	EUR; 10	USA; 17	USA; Ret	SMR; 16	SMR; 12	SPA; 14	SPA; 15	CZE; Ret	CZE; Ret	GBR; 13	GBR; 14	RUS; 13	RUS; Ret	GER; 10	GER; 15	POR; 8	POR; Ret	FRA; Ret	FRA; 14	18th	61.5
