= Honda NSR250R =

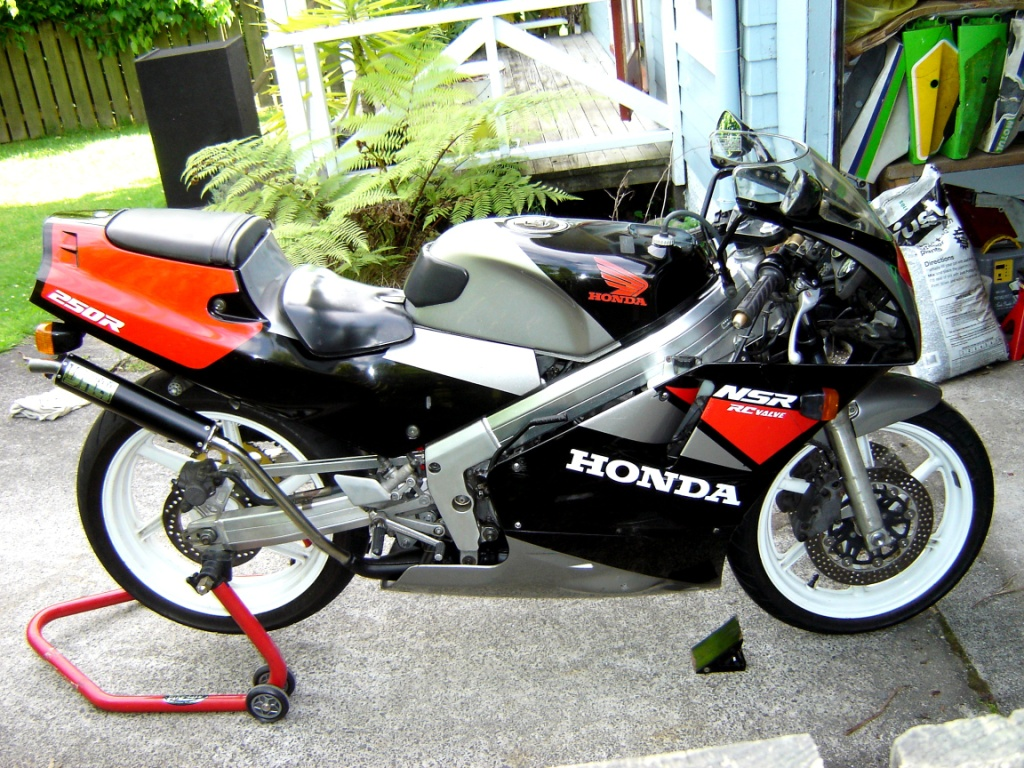
- 1989 Honda NSR250R (MC18 R5k in SEED livery)
- Manufacturer: Honda
- Production: 1987–1999
- Predecessor: Honda NS250
- Class: Sport bike
- Engine: 249 cc (15.2 cu in), liquid Cooled, two-stroke, 90° V-Twin; Crankcase Reed Valve Induction
- Bore / stroke: 54 mm × 54.5 mm (2.13 in × 2.15 in)
- Power: 57 hp (43 kW) (unrestricted)
- Transmission: Six Speed constant mesh manual chain drive
- Brakes: Drilled vented discs front and rear
- Tires: Front: 110/70 × 17"; Rear: 150/60 × 18"
- Rake, trail: 23° 15', 87mm
- Wheelbase: 1,345 mm (53.0 in)
- Dimensions: L: 1,980 mm (78 in); W: 650 mm (26 in); H: 1,060 mm (42 in)
- Seat height: 780 mm (31 in)
- Weight: 290 lb (132 kg) (dry); 330 lb (150 kg) (wet)
- Fuel capacity: 17.2 L (3.8 imp gal; 4.5 US gal)
- Oil capacity: 2.1 L (0.46 imp gal; 0.55 US gal)

The Honda NSR250R is a street-legal road-orientated 249cc two stroke sport bike produced by Honda Motor Co., Ltd between 1987 and 1999.

It evolved from the popular NS250R MC11 and was produced over four distinct generations, each powered by liquid-cooled, reed valve inducted 249cc 90° V-twin two stroke engines. All engines incorporated the Honda RC-Valve power valve system, and nikasil-sulfur lined cylinder bores (hence the 'NS' in 'NSR').

The road going NSRs were built in the image of the Honda RS250R (also known as the NSR250) production race motorcycle series, although they shared no mechanical parts. This was in the style of competing factories Yamaha and Aprilia.

== MC16 ==
1987 NSR250R MC16

1987 Ignition System: CDI
1987 Swing-Arm: Straight with Rear Brake Lug

== MC18 ==
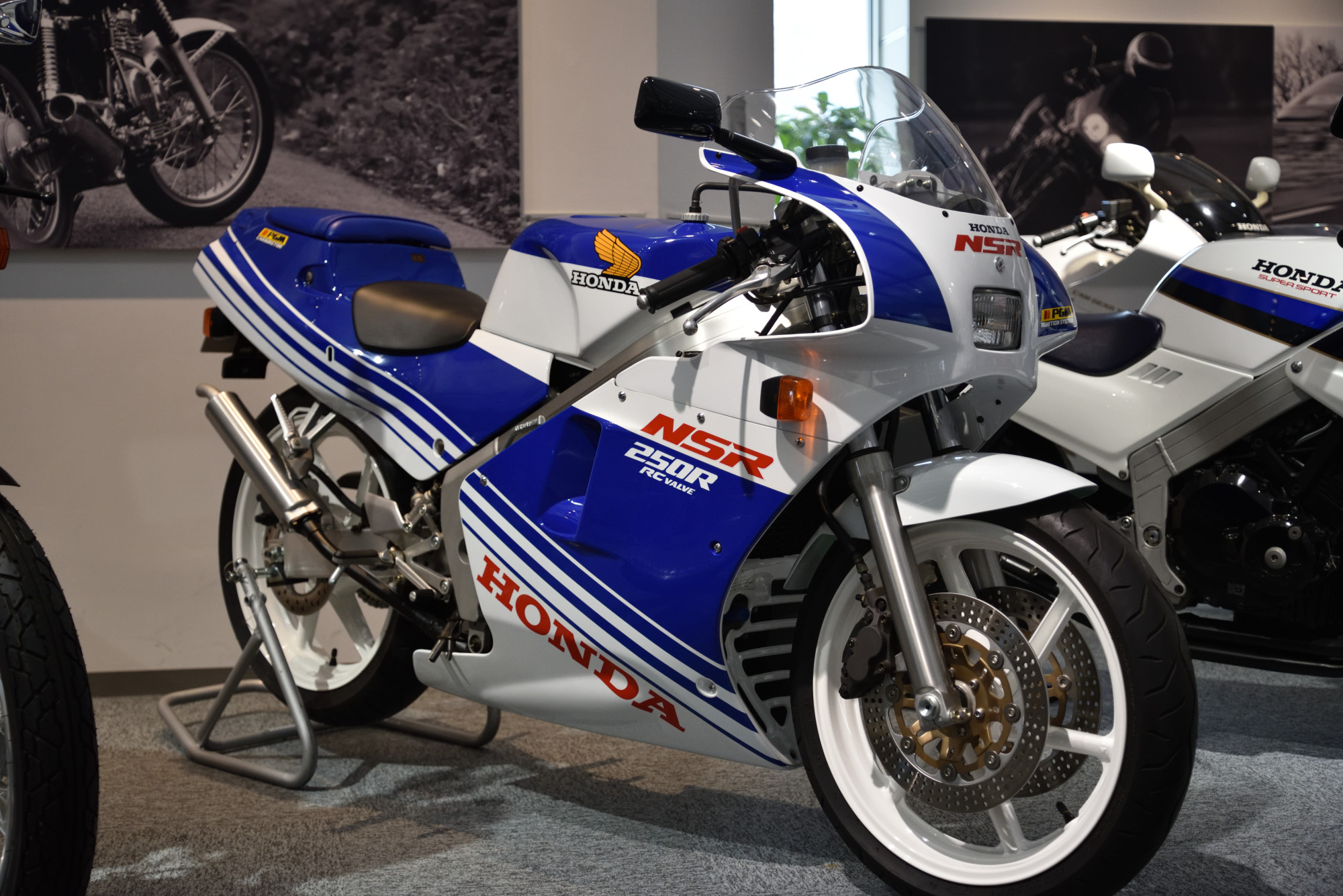
1988 NSR250R

1988 NSR250R MC18 R2j
1988 NSR250R SP R4j Rothmans MC18

1988 Ignition System: PGM-I
1988 Swing-Arm: Straight with Rear Brake Lug

1989 NSR250R MC18 R5k
1989 NSR250R SP MC18 R6k

1989 Ignition System: PGM-II
1989 Swing-Arm: Straight (Rear Brake Arm used, so no lug)

=== Engine/Gearbox ===
Exploded view of MC21 crankshaft

=== MC18 R5k ===
The engine is a 249cc 90° V-twin liquid-cooled two-stroke with crankcase reed valve induction via twin naturally aspirated carburetors.
Bore and Stroke: 54mm × 54.5mm The gearbox is a six-speed constant mesh cassette type with multi-plate wet clutch.

=== MC18 R6k ===
The engine is the same as the R5k. The only difference is that it has a dry multi-plate clutch.

=== MC18 R5k ===
Front: Twin telescopic forks. Oil-filled damper with spring preload adjustment only.
Rear: Single rising rate shock. Pro-Link with external coil. Variable spring preload adjustment only.

=== MC18 R6k ===
Front: Twin telescopic forks. Oil-filled damper cartridge with spring preload and rebound damping adjustment.
Rear: Single rising rate rear shock. Pro-Link with external coil. Gas/oil damper with variable spring preload. Rebound and compression damping adjustment.

== MC21 ==
1990 NSR250R MC21
1990 NSR250R SP MC21
1991 NSR250R MC21
1991 NSR250SE MC21
1992 NSR250R MC21
1992 NSR250R SP MC21
1992 NSR250SP Rothmans MC21
1993 NSR250SE MC21

1991-93 Ignition System: PGM-III
1991-93 Swing Arm: "Gull Arm" Right side curved to accommodate exhaust pipes

== MC28 ==
1994 NSR250R MC28
1994 NSR250R SP Rothmans
1994 NSR250SE MC28
1995 NSR250R SP HRC
1996 NSR250R SP Repsol
1996 NSR250SE MC28

1994-96 Ignition System: PGM-IV
1994-96 Swing-Arm: "Pro-Arm" single sided.
