= Aprilia RSV 250 =

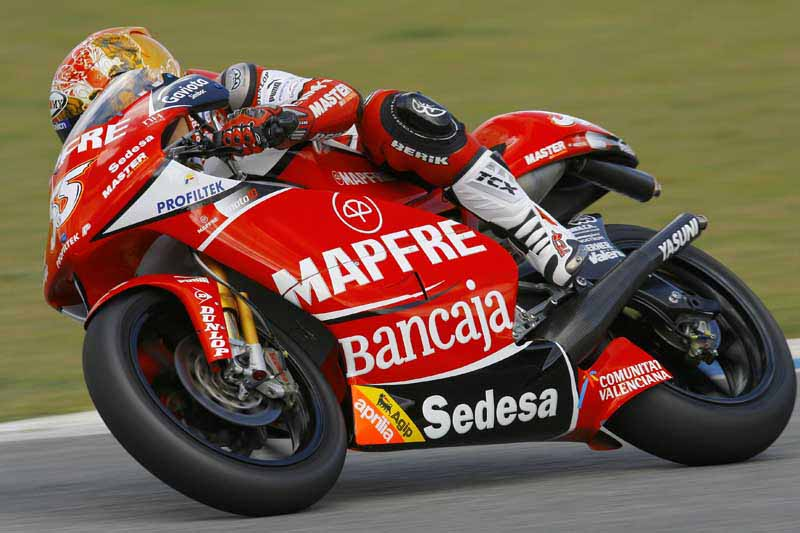
- Manufacturer: Aprilia
- Production: 1991–2009
- Predecessor: Aprilia AF1
- Engine: 249.6 cc (15.23 cu in) two-stroke engine 90° v2
- Bore / stroke: 54 mm × 54.5 mm (2.13 in × 2.15 in)
- Power: 105 hp (78 kW) @ 12,700 rpm
- Transmission: Chain
- Wheelbase: 1,270–1,345 mm (50.0–53.0 in)
- Weight: 100 kg (220 lb) (dry)
- Fuel capacity: 23 L (5.1 imp gal; 6.1 US gal)
- Related: Aprilia RSW-2 500

The Aprilia RSV 250 was a race motorcycle manufactured by Aprilia to compete in the Grand Prix motorcycle World Championship until a change of rules ended the engine-class in 2010. From its debut in 1991 it underwent several modifications and upgrades, which culminated in the last version, the RSA 250. Since its inception, the bike won ten World Championships (one as Gilera, using rebranded Aprilia bikes) making it one of the most successful racing bikes of its category.

== 1991–2007: RSV and RSW ==
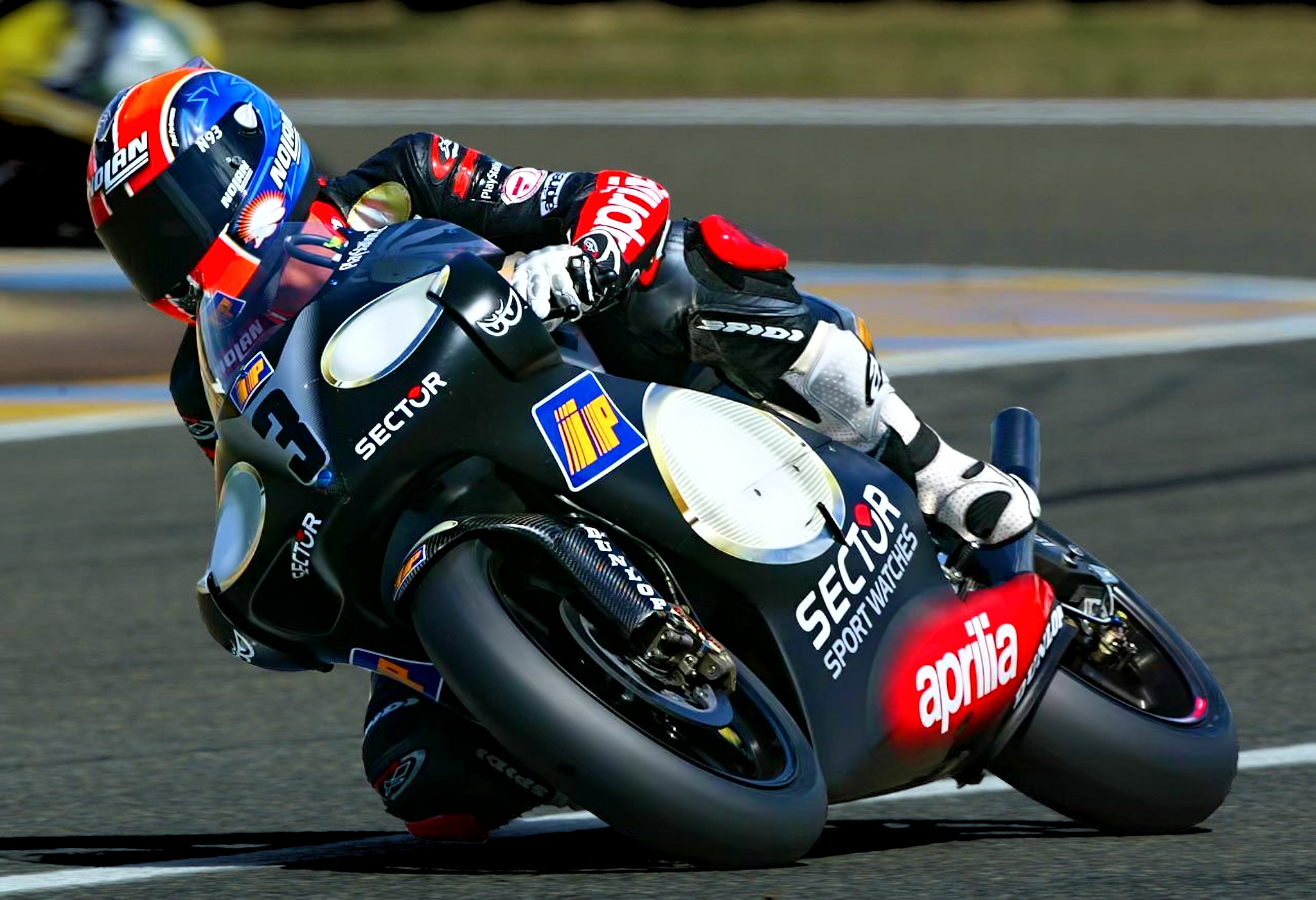
2002 Aprilia RSV 250

From 1991 to 2007 the bike was used in two different configurations: first the original RSV 250, then the RSW 250, a new version of the RSV used by factory teams and riders. The RSW 250 publicly debuted in late 2006. Another version named RSW 250 LE was raced by semi-works teams while privateer riders usually raced the RSV 250 kit production racer.

Initially the front braking system was available either with 273mm carbon discs or in 300mm carbon steel, then from 1994 onwards the only version used was the double carbon disc, either with 255mm or 273mm length. The rear braking system was one-disc carbon steel, initially at 184mm, then from 1996 at 190mm.

== 2007–2009: RSA ==
In 2007 the bike was made available in a new version, amended to RSA 250, characterized by many different details from previously, including a revised intake system and the new disposition of the gear unit and of thermal groups. The measurements of the frame changed to use a longer swingarm, and obtain benefits both in acceleration and traction. Another change involved use of three accelerometers to get more data for the management of the power of motion in situations of low adhesion in order to speed up the development of Aprilia RSV 4 which entered the Superbike World Championship in 2009.

The new engine was more powerful with a wider operational period, between 6,000 rpm to 13,500 rpm for maximum power.

The RSA (and the "evolution" version of the RSW) were used not only by Aprilia, but also by Gilera and Derbi (rebranded as such), since all three brands belong to the Piaggio group.

== See also ==
- Aprilia RS250
- Honda NSR250
- Honda RS250R
- KTM 250 FRR
- Suzuki RGV250
- Kawasaki KR250
- Gilera GFR 250
- Yamaha YZR 250
