= Honda RS250R =

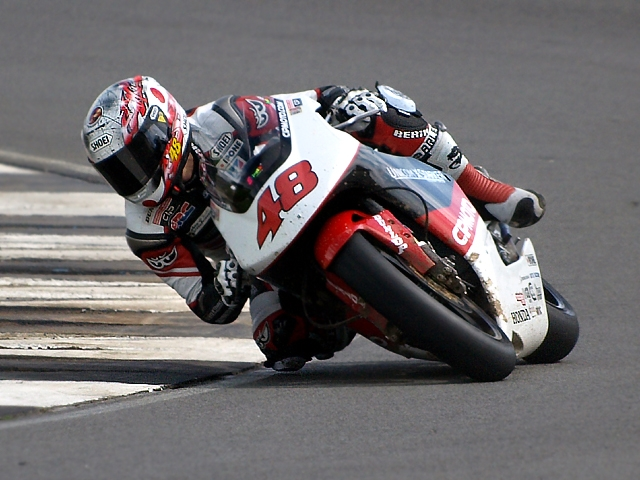
- Manufacturer: Honda
- Production: 1984–2009
- Predecessor: NSR250
- Successor: Kalex Moto2
- Class: 250 cc
- Engine: 249 cc (15.2 cu in) two-stroke engine 75° V-twin
- Bore / stroke: 54 mm × 54.5 mm (2.13 in × 2.15 in)
- Power: 118 hp (88 kW) @ 12,900 rpm
- Wheelbase: 1,340 mm (53 in)
- Dimensions: L: 1,954 mm (76.9 in); W: 640 mm (25 in); H: 1,090 mm (43 in)
- Weight: 91 kg (201 lb) (dry)
- Fuel capacity: 21 L (4.6 imp gal; 5.5 US gal)
- Related: Honda RS125R

The Honda RS250R was a race motorcycle manufactured by Honda to race in the 250cc class of the Grand Prix motorcycle World Championship. It was conceived as a production racer for customer teams and privateer riders, while factory-supported teams raced the works bikes RS250RW and NSR250.

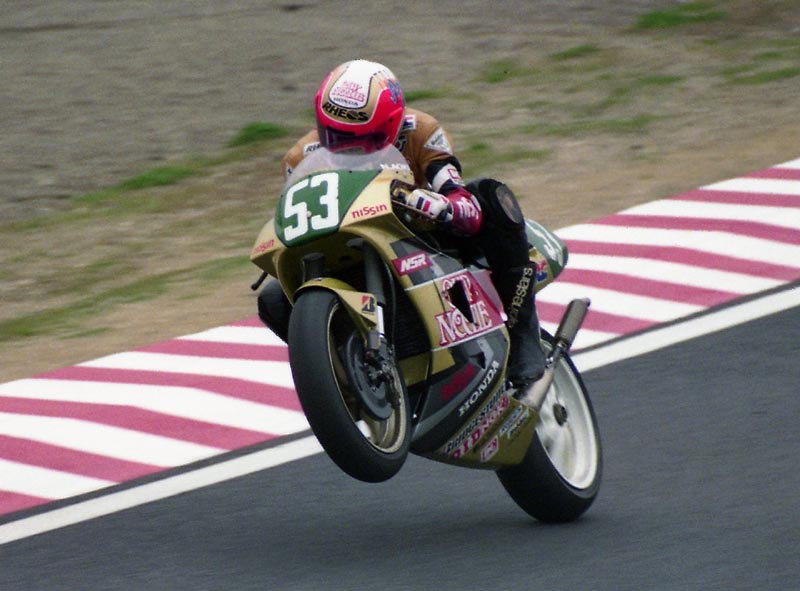
1992 Honda RS250R

The RS250R debuted in 1984 as a development prototype, racing in the domestic All Japan Road Race Championship and entering some rounds in the World Championship. It was put on sale for customer teams for the 1985 season onwards.

The Honda RS250R featured a V-twin 250 cc two-stroke engine with a V-angle of 90 degrees. A new 75 degrees V-twin was introduced in 1993.

Between 1984 and 2009 the RS250R has been produced in four different generations, named: ND5 (1984), NF5 (1987), NX5 (1993) and NXA (2001).

The bike should not be confused with the RS250RW, which was the name adopted for factory bikes in 1985 and from 2003 to 2009. Between 1986 and 2002 the factory bikes were named NSR250.

== See also ==
- Honda NSR250
- KTM 250 FRR
- Aprilia RSV 250
- Suzuki RGV250
- Kawasaki KR250
- Gilera GFR 250
- Yamaha YZR 250
