= Honda RS125R =

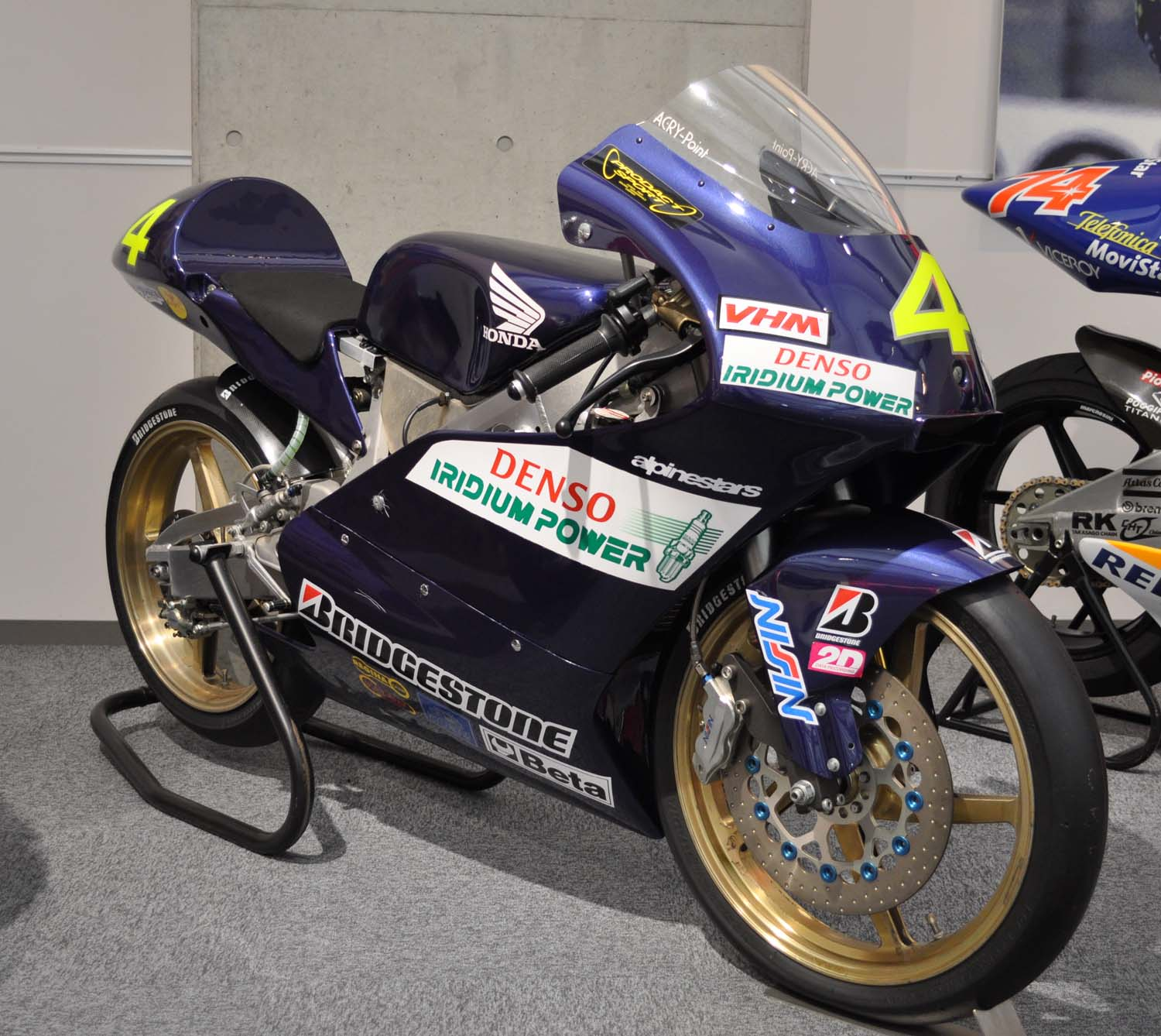
- Manufacturer: Honda Racing Corporation
- Production: 1980–2011
- Predecessor: Honda MT125R
- Successor: Honda NSF250R
- Engine: 124.8 cc (7.62 cu in) two-stroke single
- Bore / stroke: 54 mm × 54.5 mm (2.13 in × 2.15 in)
- Power: 32.3 kW (43.3 hp) @ 12,250 rpm
- Transmission: constant-mesh sequential manual
- Related: Honda RS250R

The Honda RS125R was a 125 cc two-stroke Grand Prix racing motorcycle manufactured by Honda Racing Corporation for racing purposes only.

It debuted in 1980, racing in the All Japan Road Race Championship.

In 1987 a redesigned version was entered in the World Championship ridden by Ezio Gianola; since 1988 the new bikes were manufactured also for customer teams.

The Honda RS125R has won nine World Championship titles for riders, with Loris Capirossi, Dirk Raudies, Haruchika Aoki, Emilio Alzamora, Dani Pedrosa, Andrea Dovizioso and Thomas Lüthi, while Honda was crowned Constructors' World Champion eleven times.

== 1995 Honda RS125R specifications ==
Model	RS125R
Type	JR01
Length × width × height	1800 mm × 570 mm × 995 mm
Wheelbase	1215 mm
Ground clearance	110 mm
Seat height	700 mm
Caster angle	23° 30'
Weight (semi dry)	71.5 kg
Engine type	Liquid cooled two stroke single
Displacement	124 cc
Bore and stroke	54 × 54.5 mm
Max power	32.3 / 12250 (kw/RPM); [44/12250] (ps/RPM)
Max torque	24.5 / 12255 (Nm/RPM); [2.5 / 12250] (kgf•m/RPM)
Carburetor	Keihin PJ35 (TH sensor & PWJ)
Ignition	Digital CDI
Transmission	6-speed constant-mesh sequential manual
Clutch	Wet multi-plate
Fuel tank capacity	14 liter
Engine oil capacity	0.5 liter
Frame type	Aluminum twin-tube
Brake	Front : 296 mm single disc; Rear : 186 mm single disc
Wheel	Front : 2.50-17; Rear : 3.50-17
Suspension	Front : Inverted telescopic fork; Rear : Swingarm
