= Honda NSR250 =

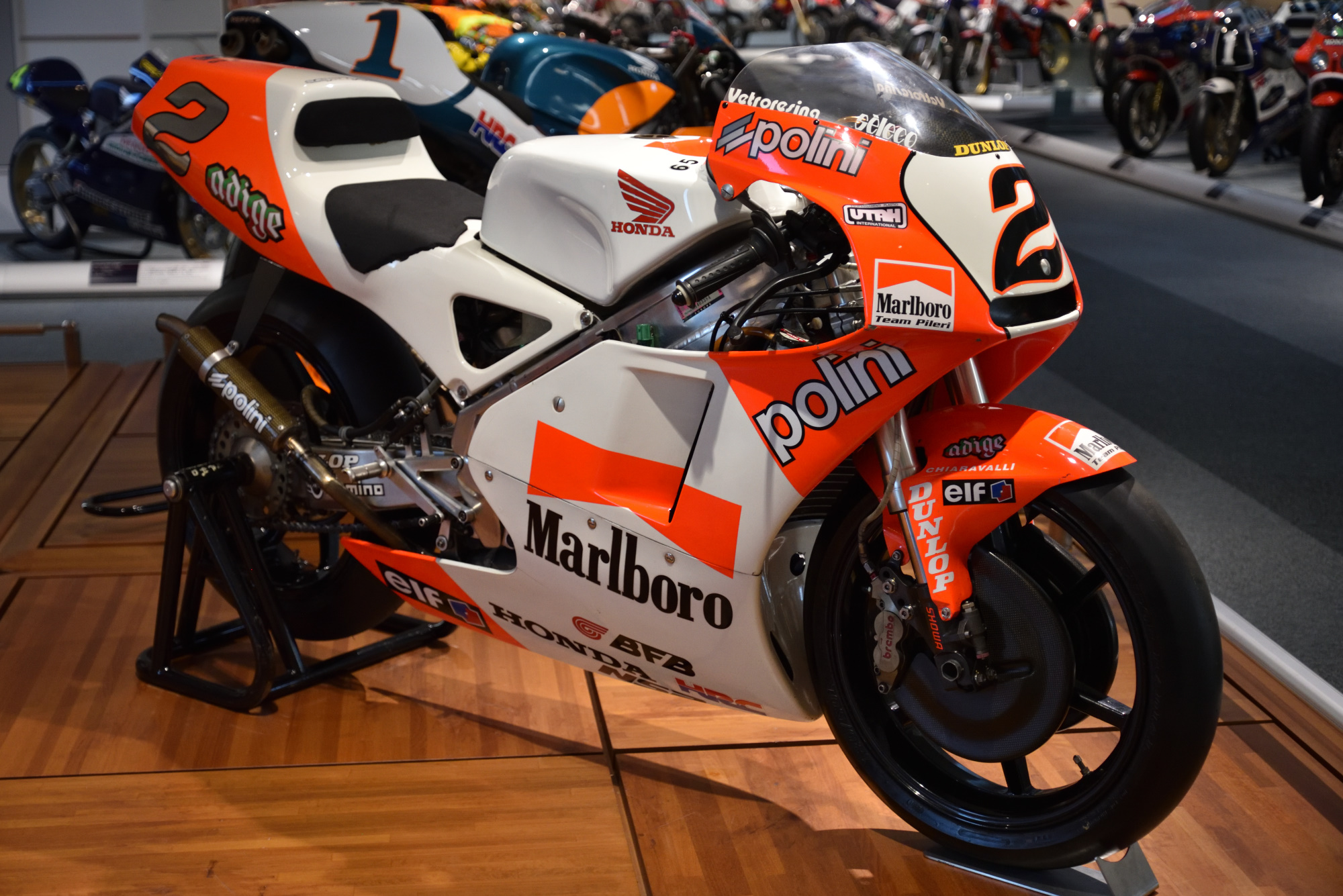
- 1994 Honda NSR250
- Manufacturer: Honda Racing Corporation
- Also called: Honda RS250RW
- Production: 1985–2009
- Predecessor: Honda RC166
- Class: 250 cc
- Engine: 249 cc (15.2 cu in) two-stroke engine 90° V-twin
- Bore / stroke: 54 mm × 54.5 mm (2.13 in × 2.15 in)
- Related: Honda RS250R

The Honda NSR250 and Honda RS250RW were race motorcycles manufactured by Honda Racing Corporation. They raced in the 250cc class of the Grand Prix motorcycle World Championship. Both names identified the factory specification bikes entrusted to works teams, while customer teams used the production racer Honda RS250R.

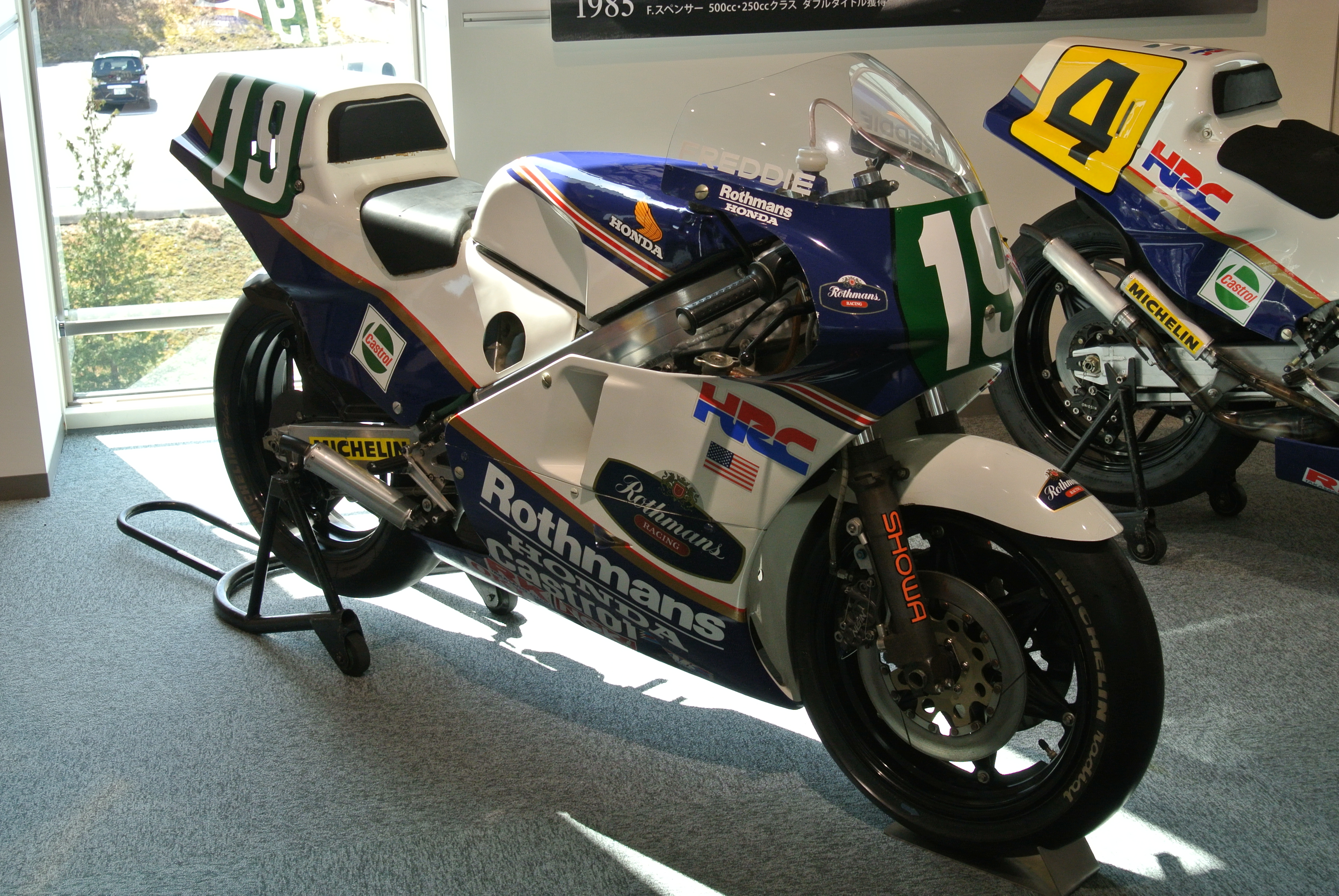
1985 Honda RS250RW

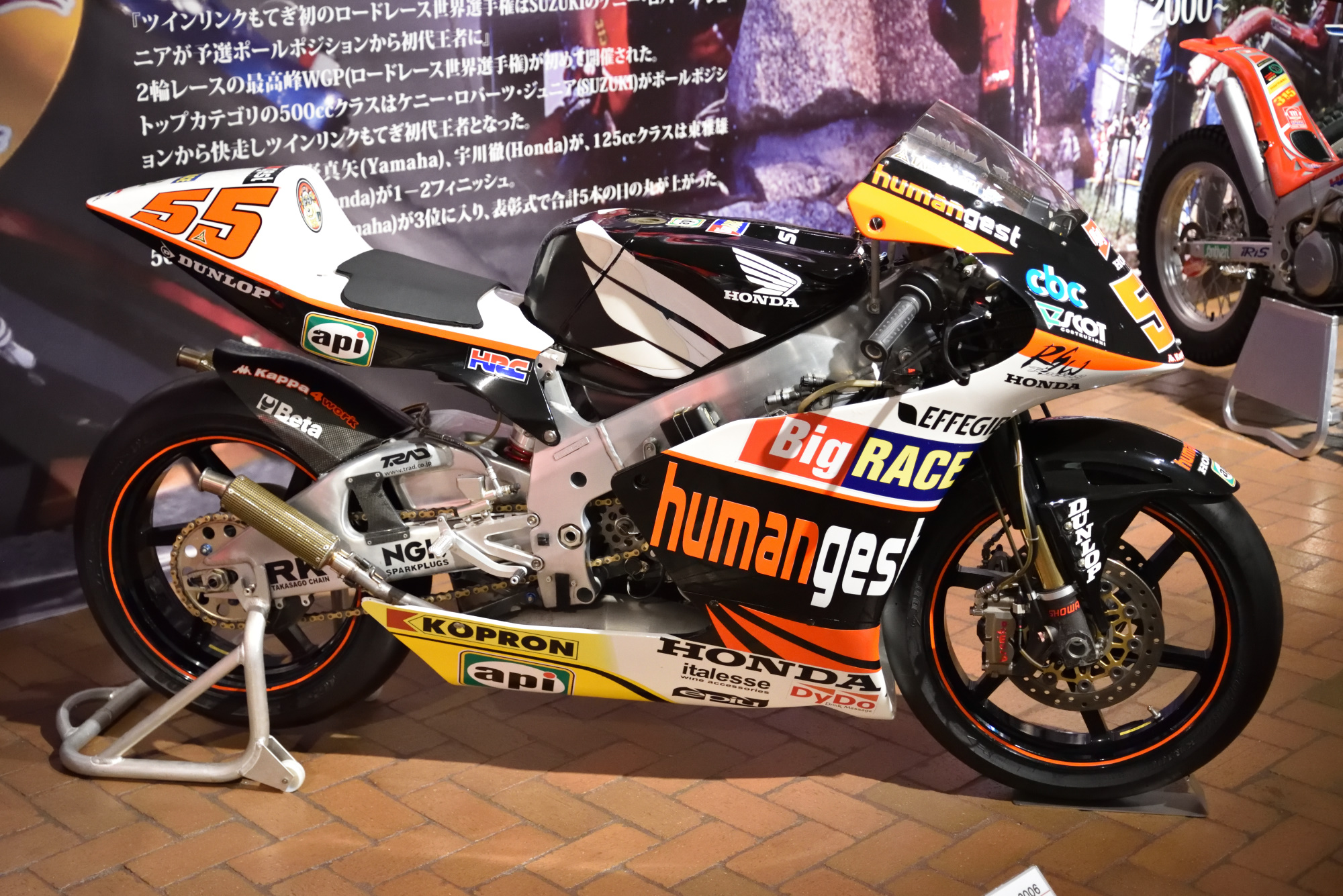
2006 RS250RW

The first bike debuted in 1985 as Honda RS250RW, then from 1986 to 2002 the factory bikes were named NSR250. In 2003 the RS250RW name was resurrected until the demise of the 250 cc class.

The 250 cc class world championship was won 11 times by riders riding the Honda RS250RW and NSR250: Freddie Spencer (1985), Anton Mang (1987), Sito Pons (1988, 1989), Luca Cadalora (1991, 1992), Max Biaggi (1997), Daijiro Kato (2001), Dani Pedrosa (2004, 2005) and Hiroshi Aoyama (2009).

Honda also mass-produced a road legal Honda NSR250R.

== See also ==
- Honda NSR250R, The road legal race replica.
