= Marco Durante =

Marco Durante may refer to:

- Marco Durante (golfer) (born 1962), Italian golfer
- Marco Durante (physicist) (born 1965), Italian physicist
- Marco Maria Durante (born 1965), Italian entrepreneur, media strategist and academic
