= John W. Drake =

American microbiologist and geneticist (1932–2020)

- Born: February 10, 1932
- Died: February 2, 2020 (aged 87)
- Citizenship: United States of America
- Education: Caltech
- Scientific career
- Fields: mutagenesis and DNA repair and genetics
- Workplaces: NIEHS
- Doctoral advisor: Renato Dulbecco

John W. Drake (February 10, 1932 – February 2, 2020) was an American microbiologist and geneticist, working for over half a century in the field of mutagenesis and DNA repair.

== Education and early career ==
His interest in embryology led him to take his PhD at the California Institute of Technology in 1958 where he studied alongside Howard Temin in the laboratory of Renato Dulbecco.

== Research interests and career ==
Based on earlier observations on the mutation frequencies of the bacteriophage T4, Drake in the early 1960s began to study the biochemical activities of the T4 polymerase. For this, he established a phage genetics laboratory at the University of Illinois. Together with his coworkers he could dissect both pro- and anti-mutagenic activities of the T4 DNA polymerases during viral replication. To describe the mutation rate in a quantitative way for different organisms, Drake postulated that the mutation rate (per base position and per replication cycle) is proportional to the total genome size of a DNA-based microorganism ("Drakes Law"). His own discovery of mutator phenotypes (i.e. bacterial or phage strains which display an exceptionally high mutation rate), however demonstrated that there can be deviations (hypermutability) from this general rule.

As an early member of the Environmental Mutagen Society, John W. Drake chaired its "Committee 17" which published an influential position paper; “Environmental Mutagenic Hazards”, in Science in 1975. This described the research needs and regulatory responsibility for managing potential mutagenic compounds in the environment. It significantly influenced research direction, regulatory procedures and mutagenicity testing within industry within the United States and internationally.

Later, he pioneered research on the mutational processes during replication of RNA viruses and RNA bacteriophages. Results from these studies had far reaching consequences for the understanding of the mechanisms that drive viral evolution of human pathogens such as Influenza A virus, Hepatitis C virus and SARS coronavirus 2.

As editor-in-chief of GENETICS from 1982 to 1996, Jan Drake helped to make the journal a first-choice for scientific publications from all over the world. In the last years of his academic and scientific career, John W. Drake headed the Spontaneous Mutation and DNA Repair Group within the Laboratory of Molecular Genetics at the National Institute of Environmental Health Sciences. He was fellow of the John Simon Guggenheim Memorial Foundation.

== Selected publications ==
- Drake, John W. (2006). Cigna, Arrigo A.; Durante, Marco (eds.). "Mutation and DNA repair: from the Green Pamphlet to 2005". Radiation Risk Estimates in Normal and Emergency Situations. NATO Security through Science Series. Springer: 271–281. doi:10.1007/1-4020-4956-0_27. ISBN 978-1-4020-4955-2.
- Drake, John W. (1958). Intracellular Interactions of Polioviruses: Interference and Multiplicity Reactivation (PDF) (Thesis). Caltech.
