= 2018 French motorcycle Grand Prix =

(France) 2018 French Grand Prix
Race details
- Race 5 of 19 races in the 2018 Grand Prix motorcycle racing season
- Date: 20 May 2018
- Official name: HJC Helmets Grand Prix de France
- Location: Bugatti Circuit, Le Mans, France
- Course: Permanent racing facility; 4.185 km (2.600 mi)

MotoGP
Pole position
Rider	(France) Johann Zarco	Yamaha
Time	1:31.185	
Fastest lap
Rider	(Spain) Marc Márquez	Honda
Time	1:32.312 on lap 17	
Podium
First	(Spain) Marc Márquez	Honda
Second	(Italy) Danilo Petrucci	Ducati
Third	(Italy) Valentino Rossi	Yamaha

Moto2
Pole position
Rider	(Italy) Francesco Bagnaia	Kalex
Time	1:36.188	
Fastest lap
Rider	(Italy) Lorenzo Baldassarri	Kalex
Time	1:36.959 on lap 7	
Podium
First	(Italy) Francesco Bagnaia	Kalex
Second	(Spain) Álex Márquez	Kalex
Third	(Spain) Joan Mir	Kalex

Moto3
Pole position
Rider	(Spain) Jorge Martín	Honda
Time	1:42.039	
Fastest lap
Rider	(Spain) Jorge Martín	Honda
Time	1:41.754 on lap 7	
Podium
First	(Spain) Albert Arenas	KTM
Second	(Italy) Andrea Migno	KTM
Third	(Spain) Marcos Ramírez	KTM

The 2018 French motorcycle Grand Prix was the fifth round of the 2018 MotoGP season. It was held at the Bugatti Circuit in Le Mans on 20 May 2018.

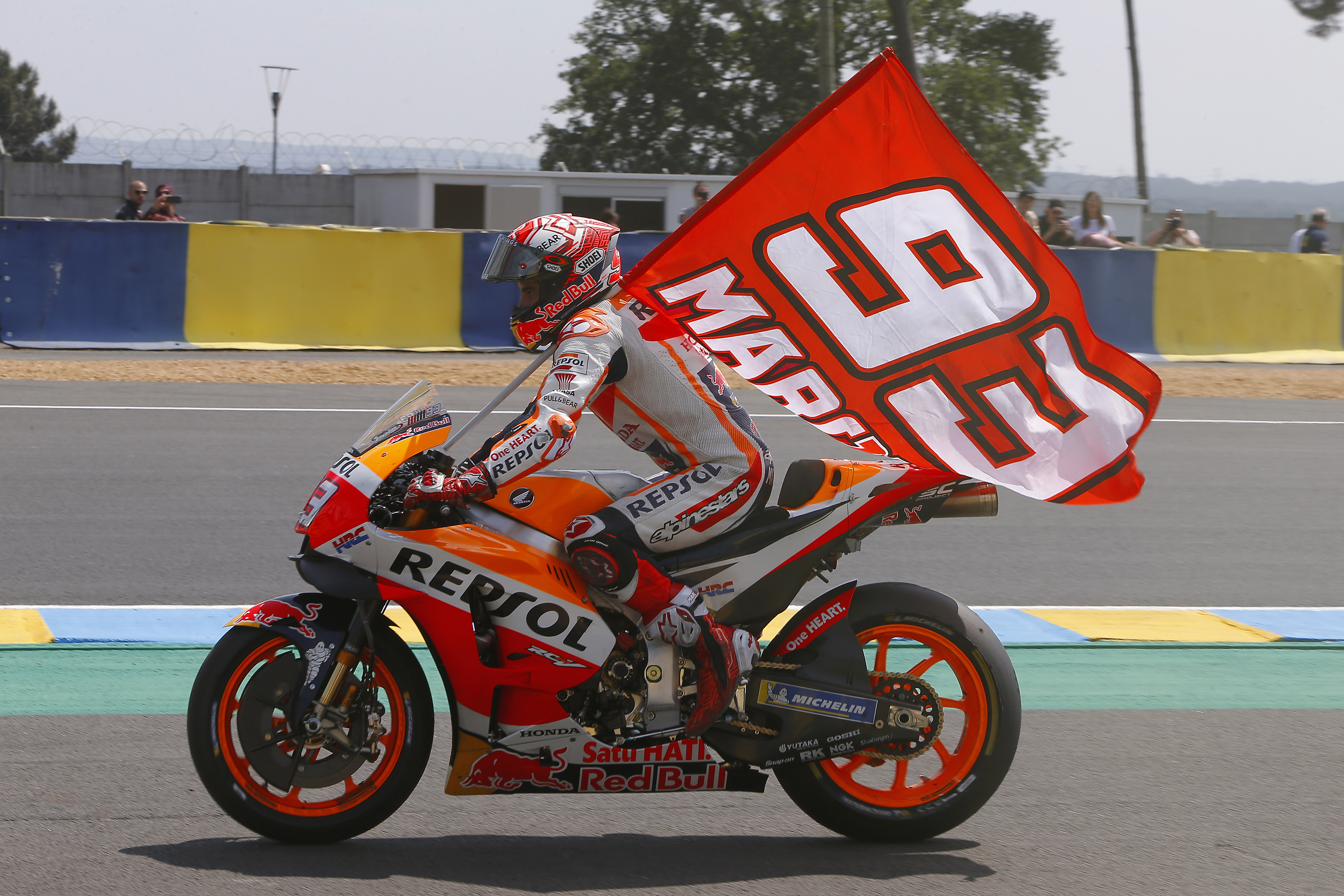
Marc Márquez, celebrating with his flag after winning the MotoGP race.

== Classification ==
=== MotoGP ===
Pos.	No.	Rider	Team	Manufacturer	Laps	Time/Retired	Grid	Points
1	93	(Spain) Marc Márquez	Repsol Honda Team	Honda	27	41:49.773	2	25
2	9	(Italy) Danilo Petrucci	Alma Pramac Racing	Ducati	27	+2.310	3	20
3	46	(Italy) Valentino Rossi	Movistar Yamaha MotoGP	Yamaha	27	+5.350	9	16
4	43	(Australia) Jack Miller	Alma Pramac Racing	Ducati	27	+6.314	7	13
5	26	(Spain) Dani Pedrosa	Repsol Honda Team	Honda	27	+7.419	10	11
6	99	(Spain) Jorge Lorenzo	Ducati Team	Ducati	27	+10.355	6	10
7	25	(Spain) Maverick Viñales	Movistar Yamaha MotoGP	Yamaha	27	+23.758	8	9
8	35	(United Kingdom) Cal Crutchlow	LCR Honda Castrol	Honda	27	+25.795	13	8
9	41	(Spain) Aleix Espargaró	Aprilia Racing Team Gresini	Aprilia	27	+26.206	12	7
10	42	(Spain) Álex Rins	Team Suzuki Ecstar	Suzuki	27	+27.937	15	6
11	44	(Spain) Pol Espargaró	Red Bull KTM Factory Racing	KTM	27	+32.304	18	5
12	55	(Malaysia) Hafizh Syahrin	Monster Yamaha Tech 3	Yamaha	27	+34.962	14	4
13	21	(Italy) Franco Morbidelli	EG 0,0 Marc VDS	Honda	27	+37.881	16	3
14	38	(United Kingdom) Bradley Smith	Red Bull KTM Factory Racing	KTM	27	+38.299	17	2
15	30	(Japan) Takaaki Nakagami	LCR Honda Idemitsu	Honda	27	+41.986	19	1
16	12	(Switzerland) Thomas Lüthi	EG 0,0 Marc VDS	Honda	27	+45.260	21	
17	17	(Czech Republic) Karel Abraham	Ángel Nieto Team	Ducati	27	+56.872	24	
18	10	(Belgium) Xavier Siméon	Ángel Nieto Team	Ducati	27	+1:12.117	23	
Ret	45	(United Kingdom) Scott Redding	Aprilia Racing Team Gresini	Aprilia	10	Accident	22	
Ret	53	(Spain) Tito Rabat	Reale Avintia Racing	Ducati	10	Accident	11	
Ret	5	(France) Johann Zarco	Monster Yamaha Tech 3	Yamaha	8	Accident	1	
Ret	4	(Italy) Andrea Dovizioso	Ducati Team	Ducati	4	Accident	5	
Ret	19	(Spain) Álvaro Bautista	Ángel Nieto Team	Ducati	1	Accident	20	
Ret	29	(Italy) Andrea Iannone	Team Suzuki Ecstar	Suzuki	0	Accident	4	

=== Moto2 ===
Pos.	No.	Rider	Manufacturer	Laps	Time/Retired	Grid	Points
1	42	(Italy) Francesco Bagnaia	Kalex	25	40:40.162	1	25
2	73	(Spain) Álex Márquez	Kalex	25	+2.709	6	20
3	36	(Spain) Joan Mir	Kalex	25	+4.865	4	16
4	23	(Germany) Marcel Schrötter	Kalex	25	+7.041	5	13
5	97	(Spain) Xavi Vierge	Kalex	25	+9.811	2	11
6	44	(Portugal) Miguel Oliveira	KTM	25	+9.943	10	10
7	13	(Italy) Romano Fenati	Kalex	25	+12.293	12	9
8	20	(France) Fabio Quartararo	Speed Up	25	+14.585	14	8
9	41	(South Africa) Brad Binder	KTM	25	+15.429	8	7
10	62	(Italy) Stefano Manzi	Suter	25	+17.228	23	6
11	40	(Spain) Héctor Barberá	Kalex	25	+18.809	13	5
12	5	(Italy) Andrea Locatelli	Kalex	25	+19.541	16	4
13	22	(United Kingdom) Sam Lowes	KTM	25	+21.112	7	3
14	24	(Italy) Simone Corsi	Kalex	25	+23.510	9	2
15	89	(Malaysia) Khairul Idham Pawi	Kalex	25	+25.996	18	1
16	64	(Netherlands) Bo Bendsneyder	Tech 3	25	+29.267 (Note: 1.7-second penalty.)	21	
17	4	(South Africa) Steven Odendaal	NTS	25	+32.493	25	
18	54	(Italy) Mattia Pasini	Kalex	25	+44.006	11	
19	16	(United States) Joe Roberts	NTS	25	+45.609	17	
20	95	(France) Jules Danilo	Kalex	25	+45.840	27	
21	52	(United Kingdom) Danny Kent	Speed Up	25	+46.052	31	
22	66	(Finland) Niki Tuuli	Kalex	25	+48.371	29	
23	3	(Germany) Lukas Tulovic	KTM	25	+54.304	24	
24	19	(France) Corentin Perolari	TransFIORmers	25	+57.478	32	
25	45	(Japan) Tetsuta Nagashima	Kalex	25	+1:07.712	22	
26	18	(Andorra) Xavi Cardelús	Kalex	25	+1:21.756	33	
27	80	(France) Cédric Tangre	Tech 3	25	+1:36.542	35	
Ret	21	(Italy) Federico Fuligni	Kalex	10	Accident	28	
Ret	14	(Spain) Héctor Garzó	Tech 3	10	Accident	26	
Ret	7	(Italy) Lorenzo Baldassarri	Kalex	8	Accident Damage	3	
Ret	27	(Spain) Iker Lecuona	KTM	6	Accident Damage	20	
Ret	9	(Spain) Jorge Navarro	Kalex	5	Accident Damage	15	
Ret	51	(Brazil) Eric Granado	Suter	1	Accident	34	
Ret	10	(Italy) Luca Marini	Kalex	1	Shoulder Pain	30 (Note: 6-place grid penalty.)	
Ret	32	(Spain) Isaac Viñales	Kalex	0	Retired	19	
OFFICIAL MOTO2 REPORT

=== Moto3 ===
Pos.	No.	Rider	Manufacturer	Laps	Time/Retired	Grid	Points
1	75	(Spain) Albert Arenas	KTM	22	37:40.056	5	25
2	16	(Italy) Andrea Migno	KTM	22	+0.160	9	20
3	42	(Spain) Marcos Ramírez	KTM	22	+0.709	4	16
4	21	(Italy) Fabio Di Giannantonio	Honda	22	+0.811 (Note: 2-second penalty.)	8	13
5	23	(Italy) Niccolò Antonelli	Honda	22	+2.305 (Note: 1.8-second penalty.)	7	11
6	84	(Czech Republic) Jakub Kornfeil	KTM	22	+5.487 (Note: 1.3-second penalty.)	2	10
7	14	(Italy) Tony Arbolino	Honda	22	+7.577	13	9
8	44	(Spain) Arón Canet	Honda	22	+11.190	28 (Note: Back of the grid start penalty.)	8
9	24	(Japan) Tatsuki Suzuki	Honda	22	+11.517	14	7
10	5	(Spain) Jaume Masiá	KTM	22	+11.704	19	6
11	40	(South Africa) Darryn Binder	KTM	22	+12.011	12	5
12	17	(United Kingdom) John McPhee	KTM	22	+12.073	27	4
13	76	(Kazakhstan) Makar Yurchenko	KTM	22	+12.358	18	3
14	10	(Italy) Dennis Foggia	KTM	22	+12.481	21	2
15	65	(Germany) Philipp Öttl	KTM	22	+12.746	11	1
16	71	(Japan) Ayumu Sasaki	Honda	22	+12.808	24	
17	27	(Japan) Kaito Toba	Honda	22	+14.397	25	
18	22	(Japan) Kazuki Masaki	KTM	22	+28.015	16	
19	72	(Spain) Alonso López	Honda	22	+36.479	17	
20	41	(Thailand) Nakarin Atiratphuvapat	Honda	22	+59.917	23	
21	11	(Belgium) Livio Loi	KTM	22	+1:07.363	20	
Ret	12	(Italy) Marco Bezzecchi	KTM	21	Collision	6	
Ret	88	(Spain) Jorge Martín	Honda	21	Collision	1	
Ret	7	(Malaysia) Adam Norrodin	Honda	21	Accident	26	
Ret	33	(Italy) Enea Bastianini	Honda	20	Accident	3	
Ret	48	(Italy) Lorenzo Dalla Porta	Honda	14	Accident Damage	10	
Ret	8	(Italy) Nicolò Bulega	KTM	9	Accident	15	
Ret	19	(Argentina) Gabriel Rodrigo	KTM	3	Accident	22	
OFFICIAL MOTO3 REPORT

== Championship standings after the race ==
=== MotoGP ===
Pos.	Rider	Points
1	(Spain) Marc Márquez	95
2	(Spain) Maverick Viñales	59
3	(France) Johann Zarco	58
4	(Italy) Valentino Rossi	56
5	(Italy) Danilo Petrucci	54
6	(Australia) Jack Miller	49
7	(Italy) Andrea Iannone	47
8	(United Kingdom) Cal Crutchlow	46
9	(Italy) Andrea Dovizioso	46
10	(Spain) Dani Pedrosa	29

=== Moto2 ===
Pos.	Rider	Points
1	(Italy) Francesco Bagnaia	98
2	(Portugal) Miguel Oliveira	73
3	(Spain) Álex Márquez	67
4	(Italy) Lorenzo Baldassarri	64
5	(Italy) Mattia Pasini	58
6	(Spain) Xavi Vierge	52
7	(Spain) Joan Mir	48
8	(Germany) Marcel Schrötter	37
9	(South Africa) Brad Binder	37
10	(Spain) Iker Lecuona	23

=== Moto3 ===
Pos.	Rider	Points
1	(Italy) Marco Bezzecchi	63
2	(Italy) Fabio Di Giannantonio	59
3	(Spain) Arón Canet	56
4	(Spain) Jorge Martín	55
5	(Italy) Andrea Migno	45
6	(Spain) Marcos Ramírez	37
7	(Italy) Niccolò Antonelli	37
8	(Germany) Philipp Öttl	36
9	(Czech Republic) Jakub Kornfeil	36
10	(Italy) Enea Bastianini	33

== Notes ==
Previous race: 2018 Spanish Grand Prix	FIM Grand Prix World Championship; 2018 season	Next race: 2018 Italian Grand Prix
Previous race: 2017 French Grand Prix	French motorcycle Grand Prix	Next race: 2019 French Grand Prix
