= Environmental Mutagenesis and Genomics Society =

Genome research institute

- Founded: 1969
- Type: Scientific society
- Purpose: Mutagenesis, DNA damage and repair
- Region served: USA
- Website: http://www.emgs-us.org

The Environmental Mutagenesis and Genomics Society (EMGS) is a scientific society "dedicated to understanding and mitgating the impacts of environmental exposures on the genome to protect human health through diverse and inclusive leadership in research, professional development, and collaboration."

The society promotes scientific research into the causes of DNA damage and repair and the relevance of these to disease. It also promotes the application and communication of this knowledge, especially through education, to help protect human health and the environment.

== History ==
The society, originally founded as the Environmental Mutagen Society (EMS) was formed in the USA in 1969 by Drs. Alexander Hollaender, Joshua Lederberg, James Crow, Ernst Freese, James Neel, William Russell, Heinrich Malling, Frederick J. de Serres, Matthew Meselson, and others. The initial aim was to support the study of environmental mutagenesis, originally in germ-cell mutagenesis, but the scope soon expanded to include all areas of mutagenesis, including mutational mechanisms, test methods, molecular epidemiology, biomarkers, and risk assessment. As a result of this change in scope, in 2012 the society's name was changed to better encompass the broadened reach of the organization.

== Activities and achievements ==
In 1969, the EMS established the Environmental Mutagen Information Center (EMIC) at the Oak Ridge National Laboratory, which developed the first bibliographic database on environmental mutagenesis, facilitating research throughout the 1970s and early 1980s, particularly the development of tests for genetic toxicology, through the establishment of a register of substances tested for toxicity. This, in turn, contributed significantly to the GENE-TOX program, established by Drs. Angela Auletta and Michael D. Waters at the US EPA and it now forms part of TOXNET.

During the early 1970s, the society played a significant part in the development of the US Toxic Substances Control Act of 1976, enabling the United States Environmental Protection Agency to include mutagenicity data in regulatory decisions.

The EMS "Committee 17", chaired by John W. Drake, published an influential position paper; “Environmental Mutagenic Hazards”, in Science in 1975. This described the research needs and regulatory responsibility for managing potential mutagenic compounds in the environment. It influenced research direction, regulatory procedures and mutagenicity testing within industry.

=== Publications ===
In 1970 the EMS established the book series "Chemical Mutagens: Principles and Methods for Their Detection" and the first volume was published in the following year. This has included a number of influential papers, from the first by Dr. Bruce N. Ames on the Salmonella (Ames) mutagenicity assay.

In 1979, the EMS began publishing its own journal, Environmental Mutagenesis, renamed Environmental and Molecular Mutagenesis in 1987.

=== Meetings ===
The society has met annually since its formation. The next annual meeting will be the 54th and will be held in Chicago, Illinois, September 9–13, 2023.

=== Awards and honors ===
The EMS makes three major awards. Every year it awards the EMS Award in recognition of "outstanding research contributions in the area of environmental mutagenesis" and the Alexander Hollaender Award in recognition of "outstanding contributions in the application of the principles and techniques of environmental mutagenesis to the protection of human health". From time to time it also awards the EMS Service Award in recognition of "long-standing dedication and service to the Society".

The EMS also makes a number of student and travel awards to promote and support the interests of the society.

=== Collaboration and partnership ===
The EMS is a member organisation of the International Association of Environmental Mutagen Societies (IAEMS) and the Federation of American Societies for Experimental Biology.
