= 2005 Catalan motorcycle Grand Prix =

(Catalonia) 2005 Catalan Grand Prix
Race details
- Race 6 of 17 races in the 2005 Grand Prix motorcycle racing season
- Date: 12 June 2005
- Official name: Gran Premi Gauloises de Catalunya
- Location: Circuit de Catalunya
- Course: Permanent racing facility; 4.727 km (2.937 mi)

MotoGP
Pole position
- Rider: (Spain) Sete Gibernau
- Time: 1:42.337
Fastest lap
- Rider: (Italy) Valentino Rossi
- Time: 1:43.195 on lap 23
Podium
- First: (Italy) Valentino Rossi
- Second: (Spain) Sete Gibernau
- Third: (Italy) Marco Melandri

250cc
Pole position
- Rider: (Spain) Daniel Pedrosa
- Time: 1:46.238
Fastest lap
- Rider: (Spain) Daniel Pedrosa
- Time: 1:47.373 on lap 5
Podium
- First: (Spain) Daniel Pedrosa
- Second: (Australia) Casey Stoner
- Third: (Italy) Andrea Dovizioso

125cc
Pole position
- Rider: (Finland) Mika Kallio
- Time: 1:51.451
Fastest lap
- Rider: (Finland) Mika Kallio
- Time: 1:51.744 on lap 6
Podium
- First: (Italy) Mattia Pasini
- Second: (Italy) Marco Simoncelli
- Third: (Finland) Mika Kallio

The 2005 Catalan motorcycle Grand Prix was the sixth round of the 2005 MotoGP Championship. It took place on the weekend of 10–12 June 2005 at the Circuit de Catalunya located in Montmeló, Catalonia, Spain.

== MotoGP classification ==
Pos.	No.	Rider	Team	Manufacturer	Laps	Time/Retired	Grid	Points
1	46	(Italy) Valentino Rossi	Gauloises Yamaha Team	Yamaha	25	43:16.487	3	25
2	15	(Spain) Sete Gibernau	Movistar Honda MotoGP	Honda	25	+1.094	1	20
3	33	(Italy) Marco Melandri	Movistar Honda MotoGP	Honda	25	+7.810	2	16
4	4	(Brazil) Alex Barros	Camel Honda	Honda	25	+8.204	9	13
5	69	(United States) Nicky Hayden	Repsol Honda Team	Honda	25	+8.273	5	11
6	3	(Italy) Max Biaggi	Repsol Honda Team	Honda	25	+12.051	4	10
7	5	(United States) Colin Edwards	Gauloises Yamaha Team	Yamaha	25	+18.762	7	9
8	12	(Australia) Troy Bayliss	Camel Honda	Honda	25	+42.631	15	8
9	56	(Japan) Shinya Nakano	Kawasaki Racing Team	Kawasaki	25	+46.638	12	7
10	11	(Spain) Rubén Xaus	Fortuna Yamaha Team	Yamaha	25	+46.692	16	6
11	7	(Spain) Carlos Checa	Ducati Marlboro Team	Ducati	25	+1:00.357	8	5
12	65	(Italy) Loris Capirossi	Ducati Marlboro Team	Ducati	25	+1:03.864	6	4
13	94	(Spain) David Checa	Fortuna Yamaha Team	Yamaha	25	+1:03.985	18	3
14	44	(Italy) Roberto Rolfo	Team d'Antin Pramac	Ducati	25	+1:10.258	17	2
15	10	(United States) Kenny Roberts Jr.	Team Suzuki MotoGP	Suzuki	25	+1:23.731	13	1
16	67	(United Kingdom) Shane Byrne	Team Roberts	Proton KR	25	+1:34.624	19	
17	66	(Germany) Alex Hofmann	Kawasaki Racing Team	Kawasaki	24	+1 lap	14	
18	77	(United Kingdom) James Ellison	Blata WCM	Blata	24	+1 lap	20	
19	27	(Italy) Franco Battaini	Blata WCM	Blata	24	+1 lap	21	
Ret	21	(United States) John Hopkins	Team Suzuki MotoGP	Suzuki	16	Retirement	11	
Ret	6	(Japan) Makoto Tamada	Konica Minolta Honda	Honda	5	Accident	10	

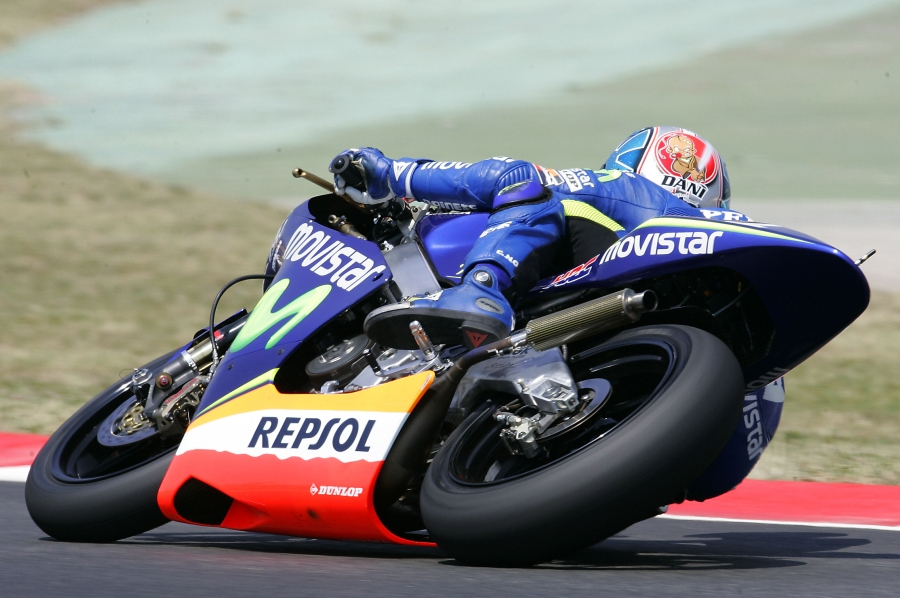
Dani Pedrosa, riding his Honda in the 250cc race, which he eventually went on to win.

== 250 cc classification ==
Pos.	No.	Rider	Manufacturer	Laps	Time/Retired	Grid	Points
1	1	(Spain) Daniel Pedrosa	Honda	23	41:29.428	1	25
2	27	(Australia) Casey Stoner	Aprilia	23	+5.637	8	20
3	34	(Italy) Andrea Dovizioso	Honda	23	+10.597	9	16
4	73	(Japan) Hiroshi Aoyama	Honda	23	+17.638	5	13
5	24	(Italy) Simone Corsi	Aprilia	23	+19.499	10	11
6	7	(France) Randy de Puniet	Aprilia	23	+33.235	4	10
7	55	(Japan) Yuki Takahashi	Honda	23	+37.408	12	9
8	50	(France) Sylvain Guintoli	Aprilia	23	+37.530	11	8
9	32	(Italy) Mirko Giansanti	Aprilia	23	+42.814	16	7
10	25	(Italy) Alex Baldolini	Aprilia	23	+43.611	19	6
11	6	(Spain) Alex Debón	Honda	23	+43.891	18	5
12	15	(Italy) Roberto Locatelli	Aprilia	23	+45.800	22	4
13	63	(France) Erwan Nigon	Honda	23	+58.190	20	3
14	9	(France) Hugo Marchand	Aprilia	23	+1:04.356	21	2
15	38	(France) Grégory Leblanc	Aprilia	23	+1:04.399	23	1
16	80	(Spain) Héctor Barberá	Honda	23	+1:19.129	7	
17	36	(Colombia) Martín Cárdenas	Aprilia	23	+1:20.909	25	
18	18	(Sweden) Fredrik Watz	Yamaha	23	+1:35.685	26	
19	17	(Germany) Steve Jenkner	Aprilia	22	+1 lap	14	
20	12	(Hungary) Gábor Rizmayer	Yamaha	22	+1 lap	27	
21	20	(Italy) Gabriele Ferro	Fantic	22	+1 lap	28	
Ret	57	(United Kingdom) Chaz Davies	Aprilia	20	Retirement	15	
Ret	5	(San Marino) Alex de Angelis	Aprilia	10	Accident	6	
Ret	48	(Spain) Jorge Lorenzo	Honda	10	Accident	2	
Ret	8	(Italy) Andrea Ballerini	Aprilia	6	Accident	17	
Ret	96	(Czech Republic) Jakub Smrž	Honda	5	Accident	13	
Ret	21	(France) Arnaud Vincent	Fantic	2	Retirement	24	
Ret	19	(Argentina) Sebastián Porto	Aprilia	1	Accident	3	
DNS	64	(Czech Republic) Radomil Rous	Honda		Did not start		

== 125 cc classification ==
Pos.	No.	Rider	Manufacturer	Laps	Time/Retired	Grid	Points
1	75	(Italy) Mattia Pasini	Aprilia	22	41:15.125	2	25
2	58	(Italy) Marco Simoncelli	Aprilia	22	+9.034	3	20
3	36	(Finland) Mika Kallio	KTM	22	+12.408	1	16
4	14	(Hungary) Gábor Talmácsi	KTM	22	+18.256	6	13
5	71	(Japan) Tomoyoshi Koyama	Honda	22	+18.440	12	11
6	54	(San Marino) Manuel Poggiali	Gilera	22	+18.544	9	10
7	12	(Switzerland) Thomas Lüthi	Honda	22	+21.460	10	9
8	60	(Spain) Julián Simón	KTM	22	+21.566	13	8
9	8	(Italy) Lorenzo Zanetti	Aprilia	22	+29.029	4	7
10	32	(Italy) Fabrizio Lai	Honda	22	+29.471	8	6
11	29	(Italy) Andrea Iannone	Aprilia	22	+30.483	17	5
12	76	(Austria) Michael Ranseder	KTM	22	+35.214	21	4
13	33	(Spain) Sergio Gadea	Aprilia	22	+38.639	15	3
14	19	(Spain) Álvaro Bautista	Honda	22	+39.559	16	2
15	41	(Spain) Aleix Espargaró	Honda	22	+44.218	24	1
16	63	(France) Mike Di Meglio	Honda	22	+44.228	18	
17	25	(Germany) Dario Giuseppetti	Aprilia	22	+50.251	22	
18	10	(Italy) Federico Sandi	Honda	22	+51.219	34	
19	86	(Spain) Mateo Túnez	Aprilia	22	+51.227	23	
20	47	(Spain) Ángel Rodríguez	Honda	22	+55.449	32	
21	9	(Japan) Toshihisa Kuzuhara	Honda	22	+55.469	5	
22	35	(Italy) Raffaele De Rosa	Aprilia	22	+55.504	25	
23	11	(Germany) Sandro Cortese	Honda	22	+1:01.121	31	
24	49	(Spain) Daniel Sáez	Aprilia	22	+1:01.933	38	
25	16	(Netherlands) Raymond Schouten	Honda	22	+1:02.622	26	
26	43	(Spain) Manuel Hernández	Aprilia	22	+1:04.894	19	
27	28	(Spain) Jordi Carchano	Aprilia	22	+1:10.672	29	
28	42	(Italy) Gioele Pellino	Malaguti	22	+1:15.210	30	
29	78	(Netherlands) Hugo van den Berg	Aprilia	22	+1:47.881	39	
Ret	44	(Czech Republic) Karel Abraham	Aprilia	21	Retirement	41	
Ret	45	(Hungary) Imre Tóth	Aprilia	15	Retirement	40	
Ret	7	(France) Alexis Masbou	Honda	11	Accident	20	
Ret	55	(Spain) Héctor Faubel	Aprilia	10	Retirement	7	
Ret	52	(Czech Republic) Lukáš Pešek	Derbi	4	Retirement	14	
Ret	26	(Switzerland) Vincent Braillard	Aprilia	2	Accident	35	
Ret	77	(Germany) Stefan Bradl	KTM	2	Retirement	33	
Ret	22	(Spain) Pablo Nieto	Derbi	1	Accident	11	
Ret	51	(Spain) Enrique Jerez	Derbi	1	Retirement	37	
Ret	15	(Italy) Michele Pirro	Malaguti	0	Accident	36	
Ret	18	(Spain) Nicolás Terol	Derbi	0	Accident	28	
Ret	6	(Spain) Joan Olivé	Aprilia	0	Accident	27	

== Championship standings after the race (MotoGP) ==
Below are the standings for the top five riders and constructors after round six has concluded.

Riders' Championship standings

Pos.	Rider	Points
1	(Italy) Valentino Rossi	145
2	(Italy) Marco Melandri	87
3	(Italy) Max Biaggi	77
4	(Spain) Sete Gibernau	73
5	(Brazil) Alex Barros	65

Constructors' Championship standings

Pos.	Constructor	Points
1	(Japan) Yamaha	145
2	(Japan) Honda	121
3	(Japan) Kawasaki	60
4	(Italy) Ducati	51
5	(Japan) Suzuki	24

- Note: Only the top five positions are included for both sets of standings.

Previous race: 2005 Italian Grand Prix	FIM Grand Prix World Championship; 2005 season	Next race: 2005 Dutch TT
Previous race: 2004 Catalan Grand Prix	Catalan motorcycle Grand Prix	Next race: 2006 Catalan Grand Prix
