= 2019 Czech Republic motorcycle Grand Prix =

2019 Czech Republic Grand Prix
Race details
- Race 10 of 19 races in the 2019 Grand Prix motorcycle racing season
- Date: 4 August 2019
- Official name: Monster Energy Grand Prix České republiky
- Location: Brno Circuit, Brno, Czech Republic
- Course: Permanent racing facility; 5.403 km (3.357 mi)

MotoGP
Pole position
Rider	(Spain) Marc Márquez	Honda
Time	2:02.753	
Fastest lap
Rider	(Spain) Álex Rins	Suzuki
Time	1:56.912 on lap 3	
Podium
First	(Spain) Marc Márquez	Honda
Second	(Italy) Andrea Dovizioso	Ducati
Third	(Australia) Jack Miller	Ducati

Moto2
Pole position
Rider	(Spain) Álex Márquez	Kalex
Time	2:06.787	
Fastest lap
Rider	(Spain) Álex Márquez	Kalex
Time	2:01.463 on lap 2	
Podium
First	(Spain) Álex Márquez	Kalex
Second	(Italy) Fabio Di Giannantonio	Speed Up
Third	(Italy) Enea Bastianini	Kalex

Moto3
Pole position
Rider	(Italy) Tony Arbolino	Honda
Time	2:18.020	
Fastest lap
Rider	(Italy) Niccolò Antonelli	Honda
Time	2:08.451 on lap 4	
Podium
First	(Spain) Arón Canet	KTM
Second	(Italy) Lorenzo Dalla Porta	Honda
Third	(Italy) Tony Arbolino	Honda

The 2019 Czech Republic motorcycle Grand Prix was the tenth round of the 2019 MotoGP season. It was held at the Brno Circuit in Brno on 4 August 2019.

== Classification ==
=== MotoGP ===
Pos.	No.	Rider	Team	Manufacturer	Laps	Time/Retired	Grid	Points
1	93	(Spain) Marc Márquez	Repsol Honda Team	Honda	20	39:24.430	1	25
2	4	(Italy) Andrea Dovizioso	Ducati Team	Ducati	20	+2.452	4	20
3	43	(Australia) Jack Miller	Pramac Racing	Ducati	20	+3.497	2	16
4	42	(Spain) Álex Rins	Team Suzuki Ecstar	Suzuki	20	+4.858	6	13
5	35	(United Kingdom) Cal Crutchlow	LCR Honda Castrol	Honda	20	+6.007	11	11
6	46	(Italy) Valentino Rossi	Monster Energy Yamaha MotoGP	Yamaha	20	+9.083	7	10
7	20	(France) Fabio Quartararo	Petronas Yamaha SRT	Yamaha	20	+12.092	10	9
8	9	(Italy) Danilo Petrucci	Ducati Team	Ducati	20	+13.976	8	8
9	30	(Japan) Takaaki Nakagami	LCR Honda Idemitsu	Honda	20	+15.724	13	7
10	12	(Spain) Maverick Viñales	Monster Energy Yamaha MotoGP	Yamaha	20	+16.558	9	6
11	44	(Spain) Pol Espargaró	Red Bull KTM Factory Racing	KTM	20	+18.234	5	5
12	63	(Italy) Francesco Bagnaia	Pramac Racing	Ducati	20	+19.738	14	4
13	88	(Portugal) Miguel Oliveira	Red Bull KTM Tech3	KTM	20	+22.539	16	3
14	5	(France) Johann Zarco	Red Bull KTM Factory Racing	KTM	20	+30.459	3	2
15	6	(Germany) Stefan Bradl	Repsol Honda Team	Honda	20	+30.500	17	1
16	53	(Spain) Tito Rabat	Reale Avintia Racing	Ducati	20	+30.755	22	
17	29	(Italy) Andrea Iannone	Aprilia Racing Team Gresini	Aprilia	20	+37.170	23	
18	41	(Spain) Aleix Espargaró	Aprilia Racing Team Gresini	Aprilia	20	+37.343	18	
19	17	(Czech Republic) Karel Abraham	Reale Avintia Racing	Ducati	20	+44.296	20	
20	50	(France) Sylvain Guintoli	Team Suzuki Ecstar	Suzuki	20	+48.938	15	
Ret	55	(Malaysia) Hafizh Syahrin	Red Bull KTM Tech3	KTM	6	Accident	21	
Ret	21	(Italy) Franco Morbidelli	Petronas Yamaha SRT	Yamaha	0	Accident	12	
Ret	36	(Spain) Joan Mir	Team Suzuki Ecstar	Suzuki	0	Accident	19	

=== Moto2 ===
Khairul Idham Pawi was replaced by Jonas Folger after the Friday practice sessions due to injury.

Pos.	No.	Rider	Manufacturer	Laps	Time/Retired	Grid	Points
1	73	(Spain) Álex Márquez	Kalex	19	38:49.768	1	25
2	21	(Italy) Fabio Di Giannantonio	Speed Up	19	+3.018	5	20
3	33	(Italy) Enea Bastianini	Kalex	19	+4.158	18	16
4	9	(Spain) Jorge Navarro	Speed Up	19	+4.290	11	13
5	10	(Italy) Luca Marini	Kalex	19	+7.031	13	11
6	23	(Germany) Marcel Schrötter	Kalex	19	+8.847	7	10
7	11	(Italy) Nicolò Bulega	Kalex	19	+8.937	4	9
8	40	(Spain) Augusto Fernández	Kalex	19	+11.900	10	8
9	45	(Japan) Tetsuta Nagashima	Kalex	19	+12.896	17	7
10	27	(Spain) Iker Lecuona	KTM	19	+19.079	22	6
11	7	(Italy) Lorenzo Baldassarri	Kalex	19	+20.248	3	5
12	72	(Italy) Marco Bezzecchi	KTM	19	+21.424	6	4
13	88	(Spain) Jorge Martín	KTM	19	+23.119	19	3
14	5	(Italy) Andrea Locatelli	Kalex	19	+25.850	20	2
15	35	(Thailand) Somkiat Chantra	Kalex	19	+26.240	21	1
16	87	(Australia) Remy Gardner	Kalex	19	+26.714	15	
17	64	(Netherlands) Bo Bendsneyder	NTS	19	+28.917	8	
18	96	(United Kingdom) Jake Dixon	KTM	19	+32.573	9	
19	94	(Germany) Jonas Folger	Kalex	19	+32.979	28	
20	62	(Italy) Stefano Manzi	MV Agusta	19	+35.664	26	
21	77	(Switzerland) Dominique Aegerter	MV Agusta	19	+35.865	29	
22	4	(South Africa) Steven Odendaal	NTS	19	+46.357	24	
23	65	(Germany) Philipp Öttl	KTM	19	+50.454	30	
24	97	(Spain) Xavi Vierge	Kalex	19	+58.874	14	
25	18	(Andorra) Xavi Cardelús	KTM	19	+1:04.629	27	
Ret	41	(South Africa) Brad Binder	KTM	12	Accident	16	
Ret	22	(United Kingdom) Sam Lowes	Kalex	8	Accident	2	
Ret	54	(Italy) Mattia Pasini	Kalex	8	Accident	23	
Ret	12	(Switzerland) Thomas Lüthi	Kalex	3	Accident	12	
Ret	3	(Germany) Lukas Tulovic	KTM	3	Accident	25	
DNS	16	(United States) Joe Roberts	KTM		Did not start		
DNS	20	(Indonesia) Dimas Ekky Pratama	Kalex		Did not start		
OFFICIAL MOTO2 REPORT

- Joe Roberts suffered a dislocated shoulder in a crash during qualifying and was declared unfit to compete.
- Dimas Ekky Pratama was declared unfit to compete due to effects from a concussion sustained at Dutch TT.

=== Moto3 ===
Pos.	No.	Rider	Manufacturer	Laps	Time/Retired	Grid	Points
1	44	(Spain) Arón Canet	KTM	18	39:11.879	6	25
2	48	(Italy) Lorenzo Dalla Porta	Honda	18	+0.159	17	20
3	14	(Italy) Tony Arbolino	Honda	18	+0.217	1	16
4	5	(Spain) Jaume Masiá	KTM	18	+0.404	8	13
5	23	(Italy) Niccolò Antonelli	Honda	18	+0.499	3	11
6	79	(Japan) Ai Ogura	Honda	18	+0.530	9	10
7	16	(Italy) Andrea Migno	KTM	18	+0.715	15	9
8	55	(Italy) Romano Fenati	Honda	18	+0.737	11	8
9	84	(Czech Republic) Jakub Kornfeil	KTM	18	+1.063	20	7
10	40	(South Africa) Darryn Binder	KTM	18	+1.757	21	6
11	71	(Japan) Ayumu Sasaki	Honda	18	+3.863	24	5
12	25	(Spain) Raúl Fernández	KTM	18	+5.470	5	4
13	76	(Kazakhstan) Makar Yurchenko	KTM	18	+5.495	7	3
14	61	(Turkey) Can Öncü	KTM	18	+5.540	13	2
15	7	(Italy) Dennis Foggia	KTM	18	+8.259 (Note: 3-second penalty for exceeding track limits.)	22	1
16	42	(Spain) Marcos Ramírez	Honda	18	+9.056	18	
17	82	(Italy) Stefano Nepa	KTM	18	+23.010	30	
18	53	(Turkey) Deniz Öncü	KTM	18	+25.241	27	
19	13	(Italy) Celestino Vietti	KTM	18	+1:11.129	16	
Ret	22	(Japan) Kazuki Masaki	KTM	16	Accident	25	
Ret	21	(Spain) Alonso López	Honda	13	Accident	10	
Ret	27	(Japan) Kaito Toba	Honda	13	Accident	12	
Ret	11	(Spain) Sergio García	Honda	13	Accident	26	
Ret	75	(Spain) Albert Arenas	KTM	5	Accident	19	
Ret	54	(Italy) Riccardo Rossi	Honda	3	Accident	28	
Ret	12	(Czech Republic) Filip Salač	KTM	3	Accident Damage	14	
Ret	24	(Japan) Tatsuki Suzuki	Honda	1	Accident	4	
Ret	69	(United Kingdom) Tom Booth-Amos	KTM	1	Accident	29	
Ret	17	(United Kingdom) John McPhee	Honda	1	Accident Damage	2	
Ret	33	(Japan) Yuki Kunii	Honda	0	Accident	23	
DNS	19	(Argentina) Gabriel Rodrigo	Honda		Did not start		
OFFICIAL MOTO3 REPORT

- Gabriel Rodrigo suffered a broken pelvis in a crash during Friday practice and withdrew from the event.

== Championship standings after the race ==
=== MotoGP ===
Pos.	Rider	Points
1	(Spain) Marc Márquez	210
2	(Italy) Andrea Dovizioso	147
3	(Italy) Danilo Petrucci	129
4	(Spain) Álex Rins	114
5	(Spain) Maverick Viñales	91
6	(Italy) Valentino Rossi	90
7	(Australia) Jack Miller	86
8	(United Kingdom) Cal Crutchlow	78
9	(France) Fabio Quartararo	76
10	(Spain) Pol Espargaró	61

=== Moto2 ===
Pos.	Rider	Points
1	(Spain) Álex Márquez	161
2	(Switzerland) Thomas Lüthi	128
3	(Spain) Augusto Fernández	110
4	(Spain) Jorge Navarro	110
5	(Germany) Marcel Schrötter	107
6	(Italy) Lorenzo Baldassarri	102
7	(Italy) Luca Marini	101
8	(South Africa) Brad Binder	84
9	(Italy) Enea Bastianini	74
10	(Italy) Fabio Di Giannantonio	57

=== Moto3 ===
Pos.	Rider	Points
1	(Spain) Arón Canet	148
2	(Italy) Lorenzo Dalla Porta	145
3	(Italy) Niccolò Antonelli	98
4	(Italy) Tony Arbolino	93
5	(Spain) Jaume Masiá	78
6	(Spain) Marcos Ramírez	78
7	(United Kingdom) John McPhee	68
8	(Italy) Celestino Vietti	68
9	(Czech Republic) Jakub Kornfeil	59
10	(Japan) Ai Ogura	56

== Notes ==
Previous race: 2019 German Grand Prix	FIM Grand Prix World Championship; 2019 season	Next race: 2019 Austrian Grand Prix
Previous race: 2018 Czech Republic Grand Prix	Czech Republic motorcycle Grand Prix	Next race: 2020 Czech Republic Grand Prix
