= Marco Maria Durante =

Italian entrepreneur

- Born: March 24, 1962 (age 64); Turin, Italy
- Citizenship: Italy
- Occupations: Entrepreneur, University Lecturer
- Organization(s): LaPresse SpA (Founder, CEO & President)
- Spouse: Thea Aprea
- Children: 3
- Parent(s): Silvio Durante (father), Emma Rizzi (mother)
- Website: lapressemedia.it

Marco Maria Durante (born March 24, 1962) is an Italian entrepreneur, media strategist, and academic. He is the founder, CEO, and President of LaPresse SpA, an international multimedia news agency, and the first agency in the Word

== Early life and education ==
Durante was born in 1962, in Turin and raised between Italy and New York. His father, Silvio Durante, founded Publifoto Turin, a photojournalism agency. Marco attended Sacra Famiglia High School in Turin and graduated from ISEF in 1988 with a degree in motor sciences. He later pursued studies at Université Claude Bernard Lyon while teaching in France.

In 2013, he earned a master's in criminology and forensic law, and in 2015, he graduated in law from Naples. Durante also completed finance certifications at NYU (2020) and Yale (2021).

== Career ==
In 1992, Marco Maria Durante began his career at Publifoto Torino, the photo agency founded by his father.

In 1994, he co-founded LaPresse SpA with his brother, Massimo, initially as a photographic agency. Following Massimo’s death in 1996, Durante took charge of expanding the company.

In 2005, Marco Durante founded LaPresse Nuoto Torino, an Italian swimming club. He served as chairman, working with Vice Chairs Lapo Elkann and Cristiano Fiorio t. The club attracted international talent, including French swimmer Laure Manadou in 2007. However, following a disagreement with Manadou's team, Durante decided to dissolve the club.

In 2006, Marco Durante led the transformation of LaPresse SpA into a public limited company. By 2008, Durante initiated an international expansion, securing distribution rights for prominent content providers, including Associated Press, Reuters, and Agence France-Presse, expanding LaPresse's reach in Italy and globally.

During 2007–2009, Lapo Elkann and Marco Durante collaborated in managing media crises related to high-profile scandals such as Vallettopoli, with Durante's LaPresse agency handling public relations and media coverage. This included managing situations like Elkann's legal confrontations with Fabrizio Corona, where sensitive personal details were made public.

In 2015, LaPresse SpA expanded its operations by acquiring AGR and A.G.A. (Agenzia Giornali Associati). In 2017, the company entered a multi-year agreement with Agence France-Presse to distribute text, photos, and videos in Italy from 2018 to 2020. In 2018, the company acquired the photojournalistic, journalistic, film, audiovisual, and photographic branches of Olycom, Publifoto Notizie, Olimpia, Franca Speranza, Archivio Bungaro, Archivio Bernardi. In 2019, LaPresse signed a partnership with the Associated Press for Italian distribution of photos and videos.

From 1997 to 2017, LaPresse served as the official agency for Juventus FC and its Juventus Channel on Sky, later holding similar roles with AC Milan from 2018 to 2020, AS Roma from 2019 to 2022, Lazio FC from 2000 to 2005, and Torino FC starting in 2013.

In 2018, Durante established a dedicated television production division under Elisa Ambanelli, while also expanding its management segment to include figures like Barbara d'Urso, Belen Rodriguez, Adriana Volpe, Andrea Iannone, Rita Dalla Chiesa, Luana Ravegnini, Claudio Lippi, Licia Nunez, Elisabetta Gregoraci and Monica Bertini.

In 2020–2023, LaPresse expanded globally, opening offices in major cities such as New York, London, and Tokyo. In September 2021, Marco Durante received the Global Fellowship award from LUISS University. Additionally, in May 2022, he was recognized by Learn Italy, an international Italian communication and business agency, with a special award for his contributions.

Marco Durante had a personal and professional relationship with Silvio Berlusconi, including Berlusconi attending Durante’s 60th birthday celebration in March 2022. In October 2022, LaPresse, Durante’s agency, released audio leaks involving Berlusconi, drawing attention to their media and political connections.

By 2023, LaPresse further extended its reach to Latin American markets. On June 15, 2023, Marco Durante took over as CEO and president, managing operations from the New York headquarters and establishing relations across the U.S. In 2023, Durante received the Special Award for "Best Italian Entrepreneur in the United States of America" at the Business Care International Award ceremony held in New York.

At the same year, the documentary In Arte Avvocato was shown on RAI Tre, focusing on Gianni Agnelli's life and career. Marco Durante contributed to the production alongside RAI Documentari, presenting Agnelli as a businessman, style icon, and cultural figure.

=== Academia ===
In 2015, Marco Durante became a professor of business communication strategies at the Faculty of Business Economics at Pegaso Telematic University. He also teaches media and communications at Universitas Mercatorum, a private online university accredited by the University of Italian Chambers of Commerce.

== Personal life ==
Durante lives between Milan and New York. He is married to Thea Aprea, and they have three children: Vittoria, Edoardo, and Ginevra.
