= Marcos Ramírez (motorcyclist) =

Spanish motorcycle racer

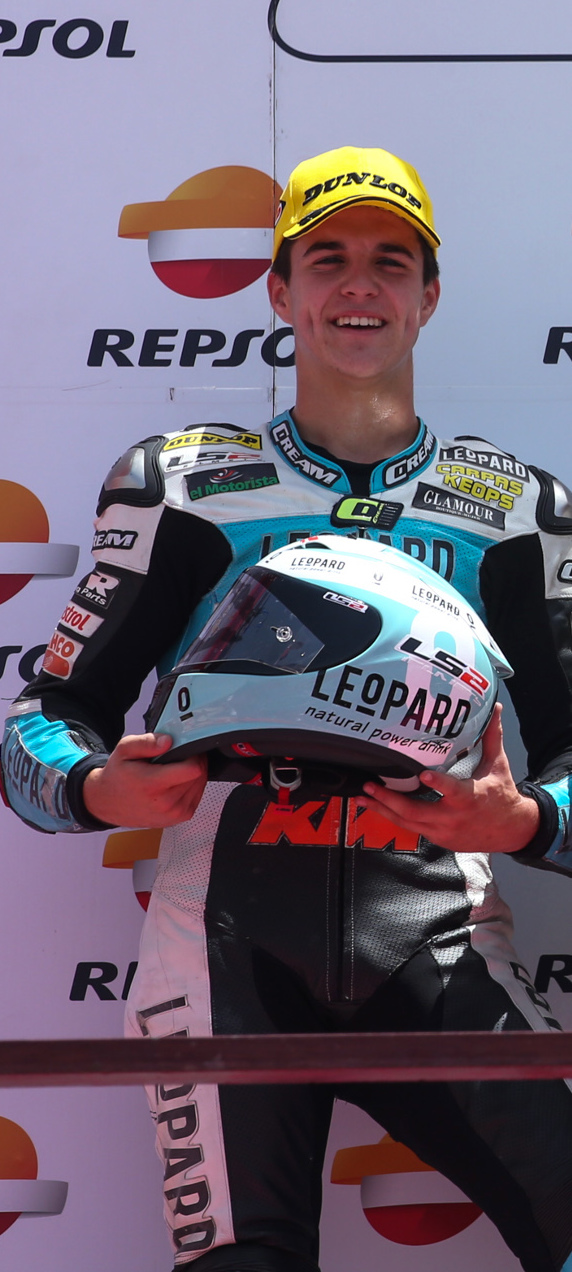
- Ramírez in 2016
- Nationality: Spanish
- Born: 16 December 1997 (age 28); Conil de la Frontera, Spain
- Current team: QJMotor Factory Racing
- Bike number: 24
Motorcycle racing career statistics
Moto2 World Championship
Active years	2020–
Manufacturers	Kalex (2020–2021, 2023–2026); MV Agusta (2022); Forward (2023)
2025 championship position	13th (100 pts)
Starts / Wins / Podiums / Poles / F. laps / Points; 117 / 0 / 2 / 0 / 0 / 362
Moto3 World Championship
Active years	2014, 2016–2019
Manufacturers	KTM (2014, 2017–2018); Mahindra (2016); Honda (2019)
Championships	0
2019 championship position	3rd (183 pts)
Starts / Wins / Podiums / Poles / F. laps / Points; 65 / 2 / 8 / 2 / 2 / 427
Supersport World Championship
Active years	2015, 2026–
Manufacturers	Kawasaki, Yamaha, Honda, QJMotor
Championships	0
2015 championship position	21st (12 pts)
Starts / Wins / Podiums / Poles / F. laps / Points; 9 / 0 / 0 / 0 / 0 / 12

Marcos Ramírez Fernández (born 16 December 1997) is a Spanish Grand Prix motorcycle racer, who last competed for QJMotor Factory Racing in the 2026 Supersport World Championship.

== Career ==
=== Junior career ===
In 2012, Ramírez was a competitor of the Red Bull MotoGP Rookies Cup, and qualified on pole position in his first ever race, the opening round in Jerez, eventually finishing the race in second. He would score two other second places in Assen and Aragon, finishing sixth in the championship with 153 points. In 2013, he would return, and score five third places in Assen, Silverstone, Misano, Aragon and Valencia, finishing fifth overall, with 145 points.

=== Moto3 Junior Championship ===
In 2014, Ramírez competed in the Moto3 Junior championship, and performed well. He was a regular point finisher, and scored a podium at Portimao. He was also given his Moto3 debut for a one-off wild card race, in his home country of Spain, for the Moto3 Grand Prix in Jerez, which he finished in 21st place.

For 2015, Ramírez would ride nine races in Moto3, on a Mahindra for the Motomex Team, but scored only 19 points, and would return to Moto3 Junior for the next season.

The 2016 season was Ramírez's breakout year. He won five races, more than anyone else that season, and finished on the podium another three times, on his way to becoming the runner-up to champion Lorenzo Dalla Porta, by merely nine points.

=== Moto3 World Championship ===
==== Platinum Bay Real Estate (2016–2017) ====
Ramírez's good performances the year prior earned him a full-ride for the 2017 Moto3 World Championship grid, riding full-time for the Motomex Team in Moto3, by now a KTM team. He had two podiums in Germany, and Valencia, and finished the season eighth in the final standings, with 123 points, 88 points in front of his teammate Darryn Binder.

==== Bester Capital Dubai (2018) ====
The 2018 season was much the same for Ramírez, two podiums again, this time in Jerez and Le Mans, and tenth place overall in the standings, with 102 points. His teammate was Jaume Masiá, who finished with 76 points, and won rookie of the year.

==== Leopard Racing (2019) ====
Ramírez would switch teams between seasons, riding for Leopard Racing in the 2019 Moto3 World Championship, partnered by Lorenzo Dalla Porta, who beat him to the title of the Junior Moto3 champion just three years prior. The duo would perform incredible, winning six races (two by Ramírez, four by eventual champion Dalla Porta), collecting 15 podiums, winning the team's championship by 210 points over the second placed team, and winning the constructor's championship for Honda. Ramírez won two races in Barcelona and Great Britain, finished second in Germany and Australia, and ended the season third in the standings with 183 points.

=== Moto2 World Championship ===
==== American Racing (2020–2021) ====
===== 2020 =====
Following their brilliant performance, both Ramírez and Dalla Porta were promoted to Moto2 for the 2020 Moto2 World Championship. Ramírez would partner Joe Roberts at American Racing team, in what was a mixed season. While Ramírez struggled, collecting just 37 points and finishing just 19th in the standings, his teammate Roberts grabbed a podium in Brno, and ended the season seventh in the standings, with 94 points. Dalla Porta also struggled, getting just five points throughout the year, at Italtrans.

===== 2021 =====
Ramírez's teammate Joe Roberts joined Italtrans to partner Dalla Porta in the 2021 Moto2 World Championship, creating an opening at American racing next to Ramírez. Cameron Beaubier joined, and the pair had a relatively similar season, Beaubier finishing with 50 points, Ramírez with 39, just two points better than his tally last season. Due to his lack of results, Ramírez was not offered a new contract at the end of 2021.

==== Forward Racing (2022–2023) ====
Following his departure from American Racing, Ramírez was offered a contract by MV Agusta Forward Racing, for the 2022 Moto2 World Championship, partnering Simone Corsi at the team.

==== Return to American Racing (2023–2025) ====
In August, Ramírez returned from Forward to American Racing, where he took over from Sean Dylan Kelly, who was booted out of the Austrian Motorcycle Grand Prix. Ramirez returned to his old strength on the Kalex. He was finished third on the podium for the first time in his Moto2 career at the Malaysian GP. Following his third place in Sepang, American Racing confirmed that Ramírez would complete the team in 2024 alongside returnee Joe Roberts.

== Career statistics ==
=== CEV Moto3 Championship ===
==== Races by year ====
(key) (Races in bold indicate pole position, races in italics indicate fastest lap)

Year	Bike	1	2	3	4	5	6	7	8	9	Pos	Pts
2012	FTR Honda	JER; 6	NAV; 5	ARA; 4	CAT; 5	ALB1; 4	ALB2; Ret	VAL; 11			5th	63
2013	KTM	CAT1; 4	CAT2; 5	ARA; 4	ALB1; 3	ALB2; 8	NAV; 3	VAL1; 4	VAL1; 12	JER; 2	2nd	114

=== Red Bull MotoGP Rookies Cup ===
==== Races by year ====
(key) (Races in bold indicate pole position, races in italics indicate fastest lap)

Year	1	2	3	4	5	6	7	8	9	10	11	12	13	14	15	Pos	Pts
2012	**SPA1**; 2	**SPA2**; 6	POR1; 7	POR2; Ret	GBR1; 14	GBR2; 9	NED1; 8	NED2; 2	GER1; 6	GER2; 5	CZE1; 4	CZE2; 12	RSM; 10	ARA1; 2	ARA2; 4	6th	153
2013	AME1; 8	AME2; 13	JER1; 12	JER2; 8	ASS1; 3	ASS2; 6	SAC1; 9	SAC2; 8	BRN; 7	SIL1; 3	SIL2; 3	MIS; 3	ARA1; 8	ARA2; 3		5th	145

=== FIM CEV Moto3 Junior World Championship ===
==== Races by year ====
(key) (Races in bold indicate pole position, races in italics indicate fastest lap)

Year	Bike	1	2	3	4	5	6	7	8	9	10	11	12	Pos	Pts
2014	KTM	JER1; 5	JER2; Ret	LMS; 6	ARA; 5	CAT1; 4	CAT2; 7	ALB; 7						5th	101
2014	Ioda								NAV; 8	ALG; 3	VAL1; 9	VAL1; 9		5th	101
2016	KTM	VAL1; 1	VAL2; 2	LMS; 4	ARA; 1	CAT1; 12	CAT2; Ret	ALB; 2	ALG; 1	JER1; 1	JER2; 2	**VAL1**; 1	VAL2; 13	2nd	205

=== FIM CEV Moto2 European Championship ===
==== Races by year ====
(key) (Races in bold indicate pole position, races in italics indicate fastest lap)

Year	Bike	1	2	3	4	5	6	7	8	9	10	11	Pos	Pts
2015	Yamaha	ALG1; 18	ALG2; 17	CAT	ARA1	ARA2	ALB; 14	NAV1; 8	NAV2; 11		VAL1; 12	VAL2; 16	15th	26
2015	Ariane									JER; 9			15th	26
2026	Forward	CAT1	CAT2	EST1	EST2	JER	MAG1	MAG2	VAL	ARA1	ARA2	MIS	NC*	0*

=== FIM CEV Superstock 600 Championship ===
==== Races by year ====
(key) (Races in bold indicate pole position) (Races in italics indicate fastest lap)

Year	Bike	1	2	3	4	5	6	7	8	9	10	11	Pos	Pts
2015	Yamaha	ALG1; 18	ALG2; 17	CAT	ARA1	ARA2	ALB; 14	NAV1; 8	NAV2; 11	JER	VAL1; 12	VAL2; 16	1st	175

=== Supersport World Championship ===
==== Races by year ====
(key) (Races in bold indicate pole position; races in italics indicate fastest lap)

Year	Bike	1	2	3	4	5	6	7	8	9	10	11	12	Pos	Pts
2015	Kawasaki	AUS; 19	THA											21st	12
2015	Yamaha			SPA; 14	NED	ITA								21st	12
2015	Honda						GBR; 17	POR; 11	ITA; Ret	MAL; 15	SPA; 12	FRA	QAT	21st	12

Year	Bike	1		2		3		4		5		6		7		8		9		10		11		12		Pos	Pts
Year	Bike	R1	R2	R1	R2	R1	R2	R1	R2	R1	R2	R1	R2	R1	R2	R1	R2	R1	R2	R1	R2	R1	R2	R1	R2	Pos	Pts
2026	QJMotor	AUS	AUS	POR	POR	NED; 17	NED; 20	HUN	HUN	CZE	CZE	ARA	ARA	EMI	EMI	GBR	GBR	FRA	FRA	ITA	ITA	POR	POR	SPA	SPA	24th*	0*

=== Grand Prix motorcycle racing ===
==== By season ====
Season	Class	Motorcycle	Team	Race	Win	Podium	Pole	FLap	Pts	Plcd
2014	Moto3	KTM	Team Laglisse Calvo	1	0	0	0	0	0	NC
2016	Moto3	Mahindra	Platinum Bay Real Estate	9	0	0	0	0	19	26th
2017	Moto3	KTM	Platinum Bay Real Estate	18	0	2	0	1	123	8th
2018	Moto3	KTM	Bester Capital Dubai	18	0	2	0	0	102	10th
2019	Moto3	Honda	Leopard Racing	19	2	4	2	1	183	**3rd**
2020	Moto2	Kalex	American Racing	15	0	0	0	0	37	19th
2021	Moto2	Kalex	American Racing	17	0	0	0	0	39	17th
2022	Moto2	MV Agusta	MV Agusta Forward Racing	20	0	0	0	0	5	30th
2023	Moto2	Forward	Forward Team	8	0	0	0	0	0	16th
2023	Moto2	Kalex	American Racing	11	0	1	0	0	65	16th
2024	Moto2	Kalex	OnlyFans American Racing	19	0	1	0	0	116	11th
2025	Moto2	Kalex	OnlyFans American Racing Team	22	0	0	0	0	100	13th
2026	Moto2	Kalex	QJMotor – MSi	2	0	0	0	0	0*	28th*
2026	Moto2	Forward	Klint Racing Team	3	0	0	0	0	0*	28th*
Total				**182**	**2**	**10**	**2**	**2**	**789**	

==== By class ====
Class	Seasons	1st GP	1st pod	1st win	Race	Win	Podiums	Pole	FLap	Pts	WChmp
Moto3	2014, 2016–2019	2014 Spain	2017 Germany	2019 Catalunya	65	2	8	2	2	427	0
Moto2	2020–2025	2020 Qatar	2023 Malaysia		117	0	2	0	0	362	0
Total	2014, 2016–2026				**182**	**2**	**10**	**2**	**2**	**789**	**0**

==== Races by year ====
(key) (Races in bold indicate pole position; races in italics indicate fastest lap)

Year	Class	Bike	1	2	3	4	5	6	7	8	9	10	11	12	13	14	15	16	17	18	19	20	21	22	Pos	Pts
2014	Moto3	KTM	QAT	AME	ARG	SPA; 21	FRA	ITA	CAT	NED	GER	IND	CZE	GBR	RSM	ARA	JPN	AUS	MAL	VAL					NC	0
2016	Moto3	Mahindra	QAT	ARG	AME	SPA	FRA	ITA	CAT	NED	GER	AUT; 26	CZE; 18	GBR; Ret	RSM; Ret	ARA; 27	JPN; 17	AUS; 7	MAL; 6	VAL; Ret					26th	19
2017	Moto3	KTM	QAT; 9	ARG; 13	AME; 16	SPA; 4	FRA; 4	ITA; 9	CAT; 6	NED; 6	GER; 3	CZE; 7	AUT; 12	GBR; Ret	RSM; 12	ARA; 7	JPN; 14	AUS; 21	MAL; 17	VAL; 3					8th	123
2018	Moto3	KTM	QAT; 15	ARG; 12	AME; Ret	SPA; 3	FRA; 3	ITA; 15	CAT; Ret	NED; 10	GER; 4	CZE; 7	AUT; 15	GBR; C	RSM; 16	ARA; 5	THA; 8	JPN; 12	AUS; Ret	MAL; 11	VAL; 9				10th	102
2019	Moto3	Honda	QAT; 4	ARG; 9	AME; 12	SPA; 23	FRA; Ret	ITA; Ret	CAT; 1	NED; 7	GER; 2	CZE; 16	AUT; 5	GBR; 1	RSM; 7	ARA; Ret	THA; 4	JPN; 8	**AUS**; 2	**MAL**; 6	VAL; 7				3rd	183
2020	Moto2	Kalex	QAT; Ret	SPA; 23	ANC; 15	CZE; 19	AUT; 18	STY; 16	RSM; 12	EMI; 17	CAT; 9	FRA; 13	ARA; 6	TER; 9	EUR; 16	VAL; Ret	POR; 11								19th	37
2021	Moto2	Kalex	QAT; Ret	DOH; WD	POR; 15	SPA; 11	FRA; 13	ITA; Ret	CAT; Ret	GER; 9	NED; 20	STY; 19	AUT; Ret	GBR; 20	ARA; 12	RSM; 14	AME; 9	EMI; 10	ALR; 14	VAL; 14					17th	39
2022	Moto2	MV Agusta	QAT; 17	INA; 17	ARG; 15	AME; 12	POR; Ret	SPA; Ret	FRA; Ret	ITA; Ret	CAT; 24	GER; Ret	NED; 17	GBR; Ret	AUT; 19	RSM; 16	ARA; 18	JPN; 20	THA; 23	AUS; 17	MAL; 17	VAL; 20			30th	5
2023	Moto2	Forward	POR; 21	ARG; 24	AME; Ret	SPA; 20	FRA; 17	ITA; Ret	GER; 20	NED; WD	GBR; 19														16th	65
2023	Moto2	Kalex										AUT; 14	CAT; 16	RSM; 14	IND; 9	JPN; 7	INA; 16	AUS; 10^{‡}	THA; 6	MAL; 3	QAT; 13	VAL; 4			16th	65
2024	Moto2	Kalex	QAT; 6	POR; 9	AME; 5	SPA; Ret	FRA; 15	CAT; DSQ	ITA; 10	NED; 7	GER; 18	GBR; 15	AUT; 6	ARA; 7	RSM; 15	EMI; 8	INA; 10	JPN; 19	AUS; 10	THA; 3	MAL; 6	SLD; 11			11th	116
2025	Moto2	Kalex	THA; 5	ARG; 5	AME; 11	QAT; 8	SPA; 12	FRA; 15	GBR; 9	ARA; 8	ITA; 10	NED; 6	GER; Ret	CZE; 7	AUT; 12	HUN; 11	CAT; 13	RSM; 19	JPN; 12	INA; Ret	AUS; Ret	MAL; 16	POR; Ret	VAL; 12	13th	100
2026	Moto2	Kalex	THA	BRA	USA	SPA; 16	FRA; 19	CAT	ITA	HUN	CZE	NED	GER	GBR											28th*	0*
2026	Moto2	Forward													ARA; 20	RSM; 16	AUT; 21	JPN	INA	AUS	MAL	QAT	POR	VAL	28th*	0*

^{‡} Half points awarded as less than half of the race distance (but at least three full laps) was completed.
* Season still in progress.
