= 2018 Italian motorcycle Grand Prix =

(Italy) 2018 Italian Grand Prix
Race details
- Race 6 of 19 races in the 2018 Grand Prix motorcycle racing season
- Date: 3 June 2018
- Official name: Gran Premio d'Italia Oakley
- Location: Autodromo Internazionale del Mugello, Scarperia, Italy
- Course: Permanent racing facility; 5.245 km (3.259 mi)

MotoGP
Pole position
Rider	(Italy) Valentino Rossi	Yamaha
Time	1:46.208	
Fastest lap
Rider	(Italy) Danilo Petrucci	Ducati
Time	1:48.001 on lap 3	
Podium
First	(Spain) Jorge Lorenzo	Ducati
Second	(Italy) Andrea Dovizioso	Ducati
Third	(Italy) Valentino Rossi	Yamaha

Moto2
Pole position
Rider	(Italy) Mattia Pasini	Kalex
Time	1:51.575	
Fastest lap
Rider	(Portugal) Miguel Oliveira	KTM
Time	1:52.337 on lap 2	
Podium
First	(Portugal) Miguel Oliveira	KTM
Second	(Italy) Lorenzo Baldassarri	Kalex
Third	(Spain) Joan Mir	Kalex

Moto3
Pole position
Rider	(Spain) Jorge Martín	Honda
Time	1:56.634	
Fastest lap
Rider	(Italy) Fabio Di Giannantonio	Honda
Time	1:56.628 on lap 2	
Podium
First	(Spain) Jorge Martín	Honda
Second	(Italy) Marco Bezzecchi	KTM
Third	(Italy) Fabio Di Giannantonio	Honda

The 2018 Italian motorcycle Grand Prix was the sixth round of the 2018 Grand Prix motorcycle racing season. It was held at the Autodromo Internazionale del Mugello in Scarperia on 3 June 2018.

== Classification ==
=== MotoGP ===
Pos.	No.	Rider	Team	Manufacturer	Laps	Time/Retired	Grid	Points
1	99	(Spain) Jorge Lorenzo	Ducati Team	Ducati	23	41:43.230	2	25
2	4	(Italy) Andrea Dovizioso	Ducati Team	Ducati	23	+6.370	7	20
3	46	(Italy) Valentino Rossi	Movistar Yamaha MotoGP	Yamaha	23	+6.629	1	16
4	29	(Italy) Andrea Iannone	Team Suzuki Ecstar	Suzuki	23	+7.885	4	13
5	42	(Spain) Álex Rins	Team Suzuki Ecstar	Suzuki	23	+7.907	10	11
6	35	(United Kingdom) Cal Crutchlow	LCR Honda Castrol	Honda	23	+9.120	8	10
7	9	(Italy) Danilo Petrucci	Alma Pramac Racing	Ducati	23	+10.898	5	9
8	25	(Spain) Maverick Viñales	Movistar Yamaha MotoGP	Yamaha	23	+11.060	3	8
9	19	(Spain) Álvaro Bautista	Ángel Nieto Team	Ducati	23	+11.154	16	7
10	5	(France) Johann Zarco	Monster Yamaha Tech 3	Yamaha	23	+17.644	9	6
11	44	(Spain) Pol Espargaró	Red Bull KTM Factory Racing	KTM	23	+20.256	15	5
12	55	(Malaysia) Hafizh Syahrin	Monster Yamaha Tech 3	Yamaha	23	+22.435	14	4
13	53	(Spain) Tito Rabat	Reale Avintia Racing	Ducati	23	+22.464	13	3
14	38	(United Kingdom) Bradley Smith	Red Bull KTM Factory Racing	KTM	23	+22.495	17	2
15	21	(Italy) Franco Morbidelli	EG 0,0 Marc VDS	Honda	23	+26.644	12	1
16	93	(Spain) Marc Márquez	Repsol Honda Team	Honda	23	+39.311	6	
17	10	(Belgium) Xavier Siméon	Reale Avintia Racing	Ducati	23	+1:01.211	24	
18	30	(Japan) Takaaki Nakagami	LCR Honda Idemitsu	Honda	18	+5 laps	18	
Ret	41	(Spain) Aleix Espargaró	Aprilia Racing Team Gresini	Aprilia	19	Rear Tyre Wear	21	
Ret	43	(Australia) Jack Miller	Alma Pramac Racing	Ducati	1	Accident	11	
Ret	12	(Switzerland) Thomas Lüthi	EG 0,0 Marc VDS	Honda	1	Accident	19	
Ret	26	(Spain) Dani Pedrosa	Repsol Honda Team	Honda	0	Accident	20	
Ret	17	(Czech Republic) Karel Abraham	Ángel Nieto Team	Ducati	0	Accident	22	
Ret	45	(United Kingdom) Scott Redding	Aprilia Racing Team Gresini	Aprilia	0	Accident	23	
DNS	51	(Italy) Michele Pirro	Ducati Team	Ducati		Did not start		
Sources:

- Michele Pirro suffered a concussion and dislocated shoulder in a crash during free practice and withdrew from the event.

=== Moto2 ===
Pos.	No.	Rider	Manufacturer	Laps	Time/Retired	Grid	Points
1	44	(Portugal) Miguel Oliveira	KTM	21	39:42.018	11	25
2	7	(Italy) Lorenzo Baldassarri	Kalex	21	+0.184	8	20
3	36	(Spain) Joan Mir	Kalex	21	+0.334	9	16
4	42	(Italy) Francesco Bagnaia	Kalex	21	+0.484	4	13
5	73	(Spain) Álex Márquez	Kalex	21	+3.537	3	11
6	41	(South Africa) Brad Binder	KTM	21	+5.985	19	10
7	10	(Italy) Luca Marini	Kalex	21	+9.908	7	9
8	5	(Italy) Andrea Locatelli	Kalex	21	+11.219	17	8
9	97	(Spain) Xavi Vierge	Kalex	21	+12.371	12	7
10	24	(Italy) Simone Corsi	Kalex	21	+12.675	5	6
11	20	(France) Fabio Quartararo	Speed Up	21	+17.843	16	5
12	77	(Switzerland) Dominique Aegerter	KTM	21	+20.353	26	4
13	27	(Spain) Iker Lecuona	KTM	21	+28.751	22	3
14	16	(United States) Joe Roberts	NTS	21	+32.436	28	2
15	4	(South Africa) Steven Odendaal	NTS	21	+32.465	25	1
16	32	(Spain) Isaac Viñales	Kalex	21	+33.054	24	
17	66	(Finland) Niki Tuuli	Kalex	21	+33.505	27	
18	89	(Malaysia) Khairul Idham Pawi	Kalex	21	+43.900	18	
19	51	(Brazil) Eric Granado	Suter	21	+47.264	30	
20	14	(Spain) Héctor Garzó	Tech 3	21	+56.603	32	
21	21	(Italy) Federico Fuligni	Kalex	21	+1:13.609	31	
22	18	(Andorra) Xavi Cardelús	Kalex	21	+1:27.927	33	
Ret	45	(Japan) Tetsuta Nagashima	Kalex	15	Collision	13	
Ret	40	(Spain) Héctor Barberá	Kalex	15	Collision	21	
Ret	54	(Italy) Mattia Pasini	Kalex	13	Accident Damage	1	
Ret	95	(France) Jules Danilo	Kalex	12	Retired	29	
Ret	62	(Italy) Stefano Manzi	Suter	10	Accident	20	
Ret	52	(United Kingdom) Danny Kent	Speed Up	9	Accident	15	
Ret	13	(Italy) Romano Fenati	Kalex	7	Mechanical	6	
Ret	22	(United Kingdom) Sam Lowes	KTM	6	Accident	14	
Ret	9	(Spain) Jorge Navarro	Kalex	4	Accident	10	
Ret	64	(Netherlands) Bo Bendsneyder	Tech 3	0	Clutch	23	
Ret	23	(Germany) Marcel Schrötter	Kalex	0	Accident	2	
OFFICIAL MOTO2 REPORT

=== Moto3 ===
Pos.	No.	Rider	Manufacturer	Laps	Time/Retired	Grid	Points
1	88	(Spain) Jorge Martín	Honda	20	39:20.810	1	25
2	12	(Italy) Marco Bezzecchi	KTM	20	+0.019	5	20
3	21	(Italy) Fabio Di Giannantonio	Honda	20	+0.043	6	16
4	19	(Argentina) Gabriel Rodrigo	KTM	20	+10.948	12	13
5	16	(Italy) Andrea Migno	KTM	20	+11.083	15	11
6	33	(Italy) Enea Bastianini	Honda	20	+11.165	14	10
7	14	(Italy) Tony Arbolino	Honda	20	+11.194	18	9
8	48	(Italy) Lorenzo Dalla Porta	Honda	20	+14.567	17	8
9	23	(Italy) Niccolò Antonelli	Honda	20	+14.676	7	7
10	96	(Italy) Manuel Pagliani	Honda	20	+14.682	24	6
11	44	(Spain) Arón Canet	Honda	20	+14.693	4	5
12	17	(United Kingdom) John McPhee	KTM	20	+14.720	19	4
13	40	(South Africa) Darryn Binder	KTM	20	+14.733	25	3
14	75	(Spain) Albert Arenas	KTM	20	+14.770	22	2
15	42	(Spain) Marcos Ramírez	KTM	20	+15.237	9	1
16	71	(Japan) Ayumu Sasaki	Honda	20	+15.271	3	
17	24	(Japan) Tatsuki Suzuki	Honda	20	+15.368	2	
18	72	(Spain) Alonso López	Honda	20	+15.631	26	
19	65	(Germany) Philipp Öttl	KTM	20	+15.953	20	
20	27	(Japan) Kaito Toba	Honda	20	+15.983	10	
21	8	(Italy) Nicolò Bulega	KTM	20	+16.030	16	
22	22	(Japan) Kazuki Masaki	KTM	20	+22.492	11	
23	84	(Czech Republic) Jakub Kornfeil	KTM	20	+22.520	21	
24	11	(Belgium) Livio Loi	KTM	20	+50.691	30	
25	41	(Thailand) Nakarin Atiratphuvapat	Honda	20	+1:23.045	28	
Ret	76	(Kazakhstan) Makar Yurchenko	KTM	18	Retired	23	
Ret	5	(Spain) Jaume Masiá	KTM	16	Accident	13	
Ret	10	(Italy) Dennis Foggia	KTM	6	Mechanical	27	
Ret	81	(Italy) Stefano Nepa	KTM	5	Accident	29	
Ret	7	(Malaysia) Adam Norrodin	Honda	2	Accident	8	
OFFICIAL MOTO3 REPORT

== Championship standings after the race ==
=== MotoGP ===
Pos.	Rider	Points
1	(Spain) Marc Márquez	95
2	(Italy) Valentino Rossi	72
3	(Spain) Maverick Viñales	67
4	(Italy) Andrea Dovizioso	66
5	(France) Johann Zarco	64
6	(Italy) Danilo Petrucci	63
7	(Italy) Andrea Iannone	60
8	(United Kingdom) Cal Crutchlow	56
9	(Australia) Jack Miller	49
10	(Spain) Jorge Lorenzo	41

=== Moto2 ===
Pos.	Rider	Points
1	(Italy) Francesco Bagnaia	111
2	(Portugal) Miguel Oliveira	98
3	(Italy) Lorenzo Baldassarri	84
4	(Spain) Álex Márquez	78
5	(Spain) Joan Mir	64
6	(Spain) Xavi Vierge	59
7	(Italy) Mattia Pasini	58
8	(South Africa) Brad Binder	47
9	(Germany) Marcel Schrötter	37
10	(Spain) Iker Lecuona	26

=== Moto3 ===
Pos.	Rider	Points
1	(Italy) Marco Bezzecchi	83
2	(Spain) Jorge Martín	80
3	(Italy) Fabio Di Giannantonio	75
4	(Spain) Arón Canet	61
5	(Italy) Andrea Migno	56
6	(Italy) Niccolò Antonelli	44
7	(Italy) Enea Bastianini	43
8	(Argentina) Gabriel Rodrigo	41
9	(Spain) Marcos Ramírez	38
10	(Germany) Philipp Öttl	36

Previous race: 2018 French Grand Prix	FIM Grand Prix World Championship; 2018 season	Next race: 2018 Catalan Grand Prix
Previous race: 2017 Italian Grand Prix	Italian motorcycle Grand Prix	Next race: 2019 Italian Grand Prix
