= Andrea Iannone =

Italian motorcycle racer (born 1989)

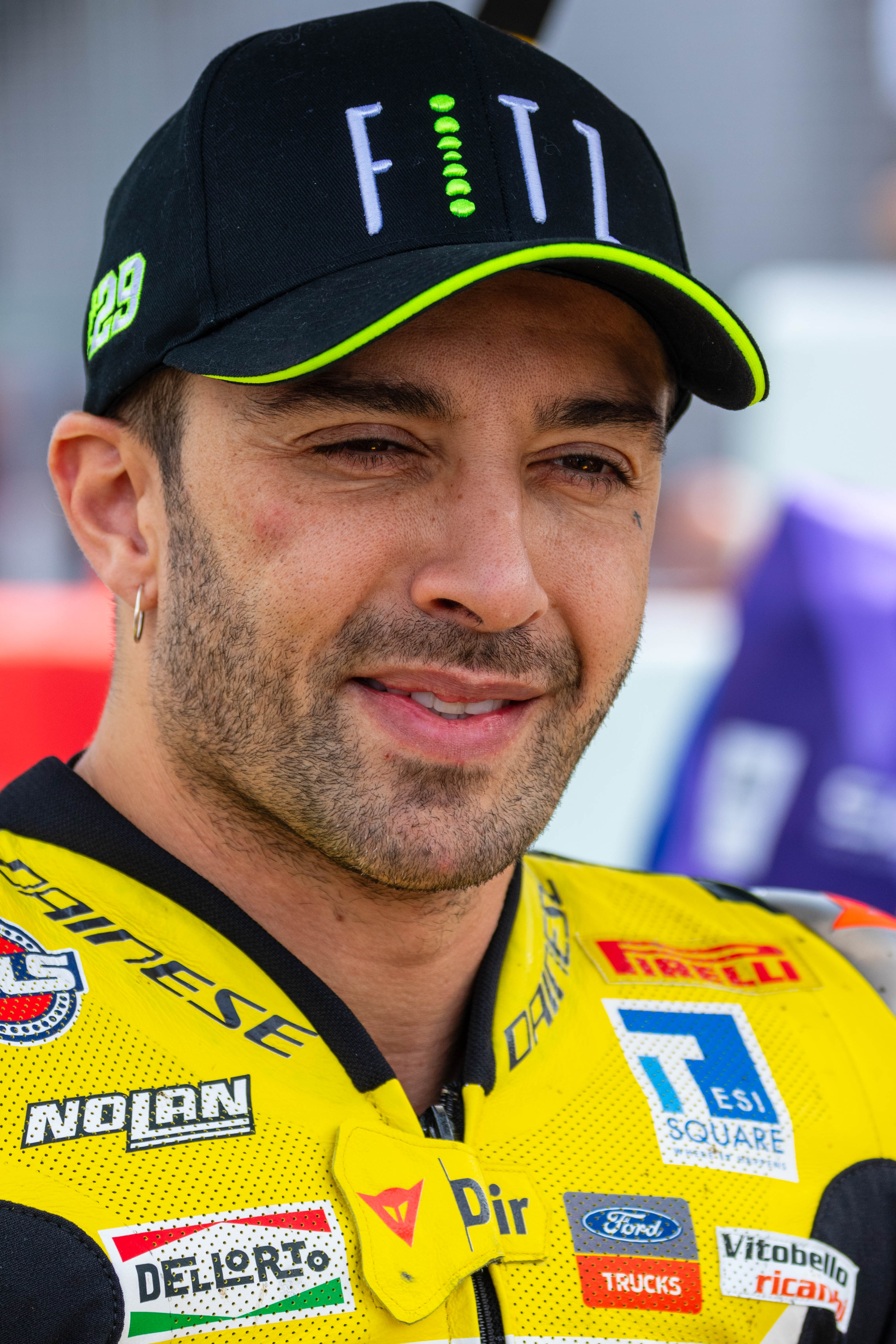
- Iannone in 2024 with Team Go Eleven
- Nationality: Italian
- Born: 9 August 1989 (age 37); Vasto, Italy
- Current team: Niti Racing
- Bike number: 29
Motorcycle racing career statistics
MotoGP World Championship
| Active years | 2013–2019, 2024 |
| Manufacturers | Ducati (2013–2016, 2024); Suzuki (2017–2018); Aprilia (2019) |
| Championships | 0 |
| 2024 championship position | 27th (0 pts) |
Starts / Wins / Podiums / Poles / F. laps / Points; 119 / 1 / 11 / 2 / 3 / 705
Moto2 World Championship
| Active years | 2010–2012 |
| Manufacturers | Speed Up (2010, 2012); Suter (2011) |
| Championships | 0 |
| 2012 championship position | 3rd (194 pts) |
Starts / Wins / Podiums / Poles / F. laps / Points; 51 / 8 / 19 / 5 / 13 / 570
125cc World Championship
| Active years | 2005–2009 |
| Manufacturers | Aprilia |
| Championships | 0 |
| 2009 championship position | 7th (125.5 pts) |
Starts / Wins / Podiums / Poles / F. laps / Points; 77 / 4 / 5 / 3 / 1 / 292.5
Superbike World Championship
| Active years | 2024–2025 |
| Manufacturers | Ducati |
| 2025 championship position | 9th (166 pts) |
Starts / Wins / Podiums / Poles / F. laps / Points; 67 / 1 / 8 / 0 / 2 / 397

Andrea Iannone (born 9 August 1989) is an Italian professional motorcycle racer currently riding in the Harley-Davidson Bagger World Cup for Niti Racing. He is most known for competing in the MotoGP World Championship from 2013 to 2019, winning the 2016 Austrian GP. Iannone has also raced in the Superbike World Championship from 2024 until 2025.

After winning four races in 125 cc World Championship and finishing seventh overall in 2009, Iannone made the move to Moto2 World Championship in 2010. A further eight race wins and three consecutive third-place finishes followed in Moto2. After this, Iannone made the move up to MotoGP in 2013 with Pramac Racing on a satellite Ducati.

After spending two seasons with Pramac, Iannone was moved up to the Factory Ducati Team in 2015, managing to get three podiums, a pole position and what proved to be his best ever championship position and points tally of fifth and 188. A further four podiums and a pole position followed in 2016 including a maiden MotoGP win in Austria. After the arrival of triple MotoGP World Champion Jorge Lorenzo to Ducati, Iannone made the move to Suzuki for 2017. After a difficult first season without a podium, he managed to get further four podium finishes with Suzuki in 2018.

In 2019, Iannone was given an 18-month ban by FIM and WADA for doping, which, after a failed appeal, was extended to four years by the Court of Arbitration for Sport, from 17 December 2019. He returned to racing in 2024, and was contracted by Ducati to race in World Superbikes for its satellite organisation Team Go Eleven.

== Early life ==
Iannone was born in the Adriatic coastal town of Vasto, on 9 August 1989. His interest in bikes came at a very early age with mini motos. Iannone has one older brother.

== Career ==
=== 125cc World Championship ===
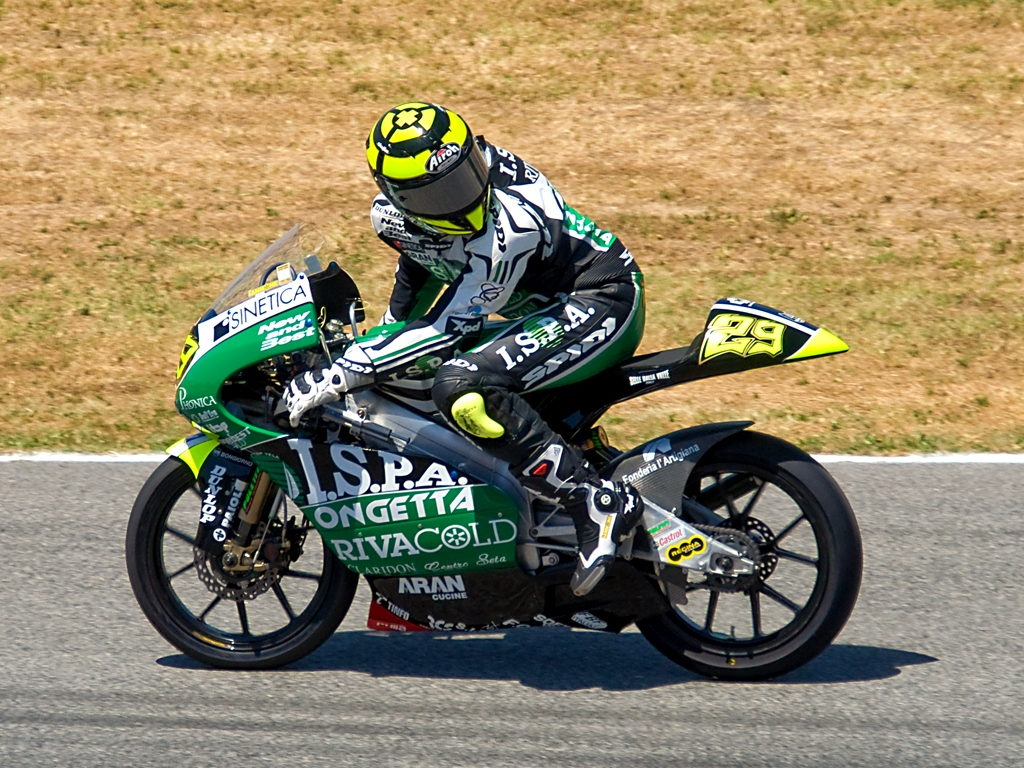
Iannone at the 2009 Catalan Grand Prix

Born in Vasto, Province of Chieti, Iannone started his career on pocket bikes and soon became a championship front runner. He participated in both the Italian and Spanish championships before moving to World Championship in 2005. On 4 May 2008, Iannone claimed his first win at the Chinese Grand Prix in Shanghai, in wet conditions. Prior to the victory, he had never finished higher than ninth, at the Turkish and French Grands Prix in 2007, although he had previously qualified as high as seventh. In the 2009 125 cc season, he won the first two races of the season, establishing himself as a championship contender, however he faded to seventh overall, with only one more win. During the race at Misano, Iannone provoked an accident with Pol Espargaró. After the incident, images showed the riders arguing in the gravel and Iannone headbutted Espargaró. This was heavily criticised by the media and lost Iannone some sponsorship; Iannone then apologised to Espargaró at the next race at Estoril.

=== Moto2 World Championship ===
In 2010, Iannone moved up to the new Moto2 series, his first time riding anything other than an Aprilia. After a slow start, he took victories at Mugello and Assen – both from pole – making him the first rider to take two poles in the class, to move up to fourth overall in the standings. He was also competitive in Barcelona, but received a ride-through penalty for overtaking Yuki Takahashi under yellow flag conditions. He then went on to win again at Motorland Aragón, a track which was new to the MotoGP calendar in 2010.

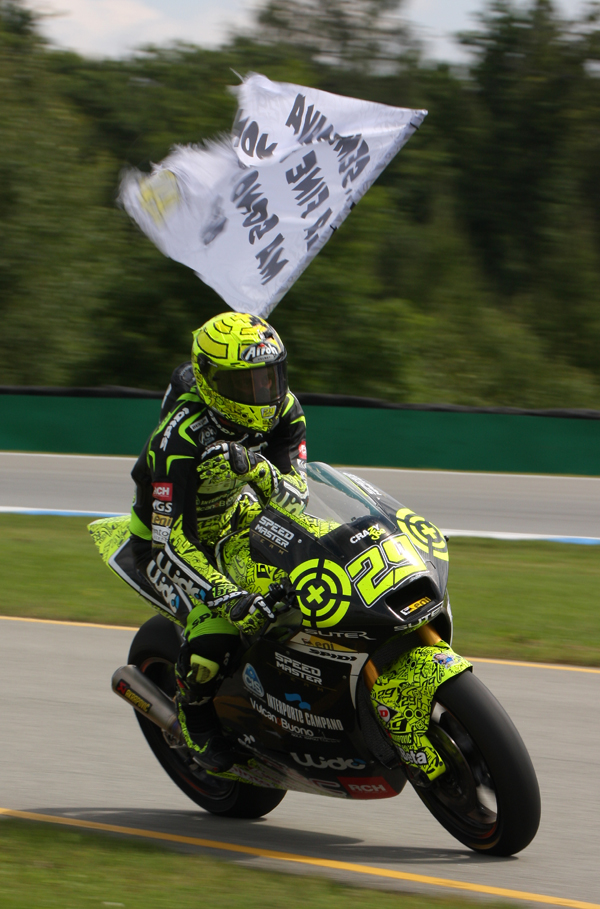
Iannone at the 2011 Czech Republic Grand Prix

2011 proved to be a very up and down season for Iannone, with inconsistency being his major downfall. Whilst being the only other rider besides Stefan Bradl and Marc Márquez to win more than one race, he would often find himself qualifying well outside the top-ten, but finished the season in third place after beating Alex de Angelis in the final race of the season in Valencia. On the Tuesday following the race, Iannone tested a MotoGP bike for Gresini Racing in Valencia.

Iannone remained in the class for the 2012 season, finishing second in the season-opening Qatar Grand Prix, having led the race out of the final corner and losing out to the straight line speed of Marc Márquez's bike. He finished 14th, fifth and fourth over the next three races, before taking his first victory of the season in the Catalan Grand Prix. He went on to get another podium at Assen. After this, he won his home race at Mugello wearing the colours of a nearby fire station.

=== MotoGP World Championship ===
==== Pramac Racing (2013–2014) ====
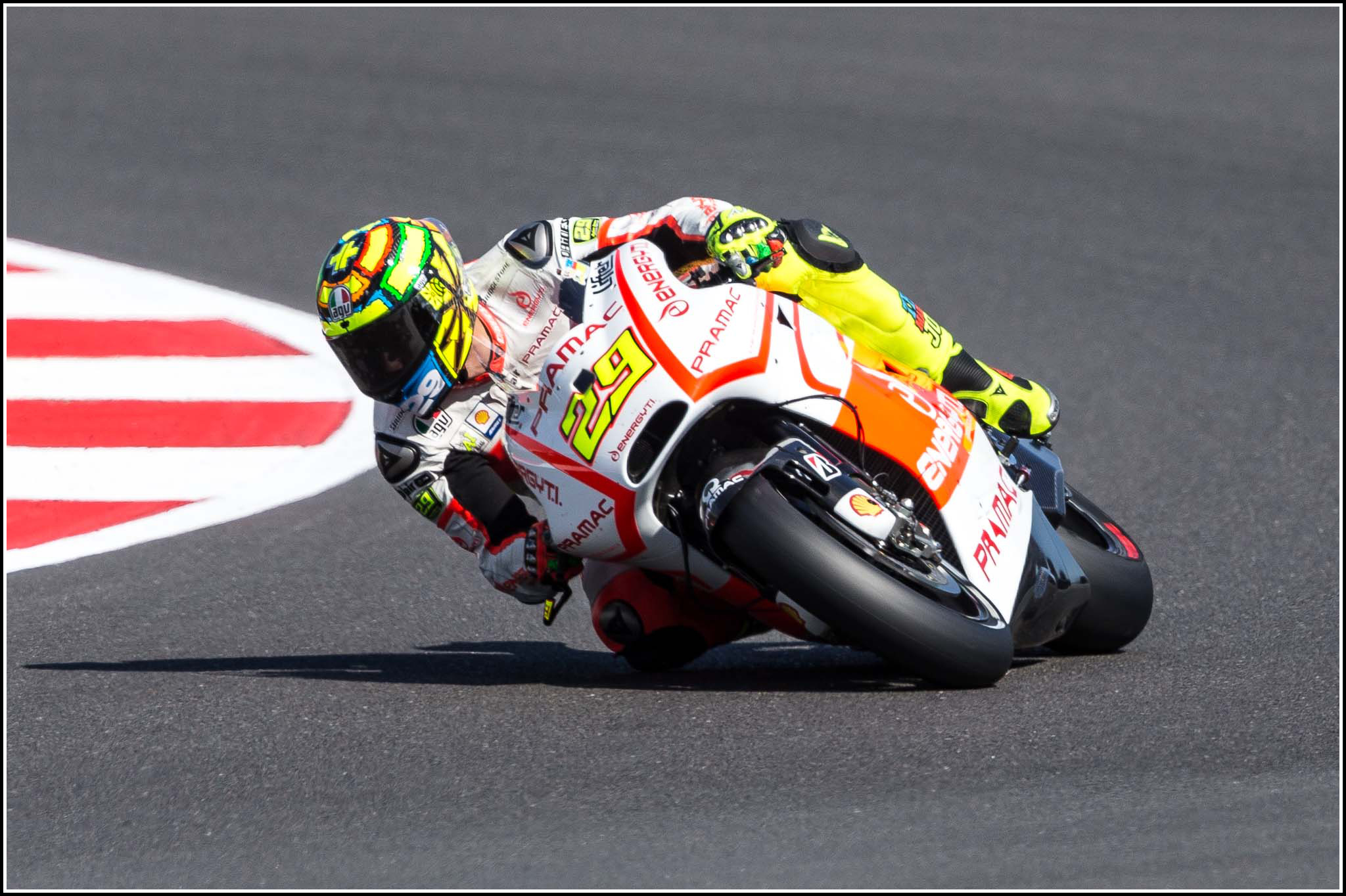
Iannone at the 2013 British Grand Prix

In 2013, after another third place in the Moto2 championship, Iannone moved up into MotoGP on a Ducati Desmosedici with Pramac Racing. He finished the season in 12th place with five top-ten finishes. His best result was an eighth place at the Australian Grand Prix at Phillip Island, but the second part of his season was affected by a shoulder injury suffered during free practice at the German Grand Prix. The injury also forced him to miss the United States Grand Prix at Laguna Seca.

In 2014, Iannone continued to race with Pramac Racing, with teammate Yonny Hernández.

==== Ducati Team (2015–2016) ====
For the 2015 season, Iannone replaced Cal Crutchlow at Ducati Corse, and partnered Andrea Dovizioso. Iannone achieved his first MotoGP podium on his Ducati début, finishing third in Qatar. At Austin, he finished in fifth place behind Jorge Lorenzo, and also recorded the first fastest lap of his MotoGP career. Iannone was on course for a second podium in Argentina, but was passed for third on the final lap, by Crutchlow. At Phillip Island, Iannone was involved in a lengthy four-way battle for first with three former world champions, Lorenzo, Marc Márquez, and Valentino Rossi. He finished third after overtaking Rossi on the final lap with three corners remaining.

Ducati kept their line up for 2016 and he began the season well, leading at Losail for six laps before low-siding, allowing his teammate to overtake. The following Grand Prix in Argentina saw Iannone in third before attempting a last lap overtake of his teammate Dovizioso, resulting in both riders falling. Iannone was penalised by Race Direction with a penalty point and three grid places at the next round in Austin. Despite these punishments, Iannone finished his first race of the season on the podium with third place, behind winner Marc Márquez and Jorge Lorenzo, ending his run of four consecutive race retirements starting at the previous years Malaysian Grand Prix. He scored points in Spain, retired in France before scoring the fastest lap en route to third at his home race at Mugello. He raced aggressively at Catalunya, and eliminated Lorenzo who was running in fifth place, giving winner Marquez a ten-point championship lead.

Iannone scored points at the Dutch TT and Germany, before his best race weekend of the season and of his career so far in Austria. His pace was evident throughout the weekend as he finished in the top two of every session apart from the first practice session, in which he was third. He started the race from pole position and although he briefly lost the lead at the end of lap one, he regained it before his teammate took it from him and led between laps 10 and 20. Iannone took the lead again and led until the finish winning from his teammate by 0.938 seconds whilst also claiming another fastest lap. It was Ducati's first MotoGP win since 2010 and Iannone's first MotoGP win, and to date is his only win. He finished eighth in Brno and then came the British round of the championship. At Silverstone, he qualified on the third row in eighth place and fought his way through the field. Around the halfway mark of the race, he began to have fatigue in his right forearm which made the bike difficult to control. He arrived at turn 17 on lap 14, turned late, hit a bump, and crashed out.

At the San Marino Grand Prix, Iannone had a low-side crash at the fast turn 15, he appeared unharmed but checks revealed he had fractured his T3 vertebrae which ruled him out of the rest of the weekend. He took part in practice 1 at the following race two weeks later in Aragon after being cleared to race, but was still having pain so decided to withdraw from the race weekend. He still wasn't 100% fit to race in both Japan and Australia. In total, he missed four races and returned in Malaysia where he crashed out from third on lap 12. It was the fourth time he had retired from a podium position in 2016. He finished the year strongly with a podium in his final race for Ducati. He showed pace throughout the season but lacked consistency and even with missing four races, he finished ninth in standings with 112 points.

==== Team Suzuki Ecstar (2017–2018) ====
On 19 May 2016, Team Suzuki Ecstar announced that Iannone had signed with the outfit for two seasons as a factory rider. Iannone paired at Suzuki with MotoGP rookie Álex Rins. He finished the season with 70 points, 13th in the championship and ahead of his teammate. In 2018, Iannone nearly doubled his points tally to 133 with four podium finishes, however it was only sufficient for tenth place in the championship in a tight mid-field battle.

In 2018, ahead of his home Italian Grand Prix, Iannone announced that he and Suzuki would part ways at the end of the season.

==== Aprilia Racing Team Gresini (2019) ====
During the 2018 season, Iannone signed with the Aprilia factory-supported Aprilia Racing Team Gresini on a two-year deal partnering incumbent rider Aleix Espargaró. Iannone finished his debut season with Aprilia with 43 points in 16th place in the riders' championship, outscored by teammate Espargaró.

=== Return to MotoGP ===
==== Pertamina Enduro VR46 Racing Team (2024) ====
Iannone returned to MotoGP as a temporary racer for the Pertamina Enduro VR46 Racing Team in the Malaysian round, after five seasons away from the MotoGP event. He would replace Fabio Di Giannantonio, who was sidelined due to undergoing surgery on an injured left shoulder. The owner of the team, Valentino Rossi, decided to hire him as a replacement for Di Giannantonio, and Rossi's decision received approval from Ducati Corse.

=== Doping ban ===
In December 2019, Iannone was provisionally suspended from motorcycle racing after a positive drug test. He was later retroactively disqualified from the final two rounds of the 2019 season and handed a retroactive 18-month ban in March 2020. He was initially replaced by Bradley Smith as he awaited his appeal, and later by Lorenzo Savadori.

On 10 November 2020, Iannone was sentenced a four-year ban after losing his appeal. The Court of Arbitration for Sport (CAS) handed the Italian a four-year suspension after being found guilty of violating World Anti-Doping Agency (WADA) regulations on the prohibited substance Drostanolone. Iannone claimed an unintentional violation as result of unknowingly eating contaminated meat in Malaysia and a "lack of incentive to dope", but the CAS found his arguments "were insufficient to establish, on a balance of probability that [his violation] was not intentional". The CAS decision superseded the 18-month ban initially applied by the FIM International Disciplinary Court with the four-year ban appealed by WADA.

=== Superbike World Championship ===
==== Team GoEleven (2024–2025) ====
Iannone officially joined Team GoEleven to compete in the 2024 Superbike World Championship, riding a Ducati Panigale V4 R. He returned to competition after a four-year absence, following a ban dating from 2019, due to a doping violation. He completed his first official test, allowed whilst still technically under the ban, at Jerez in late October/early November, stating that his arms were out-of-condition. He had some success in the season finishing eighth overall with five podiums including one win.

The team now under the PATA GoEleven name retained Iannone for 2025 and despite significantly lower points still managed a ninth place finish.

=== Harley-Davidson Bagger World Cup ===
==== Cecchini Racing (2026) ====
Iannone joined Cecchini Racing in the inaugural Harley-Davidson Bagger World Cup after his effort to launch his own World Superbike squad by the start of the 2026 season was unsuccessful.

==== Niti Racing BWC (2026) ====
Iannone would join Niti Racing BWC for the 2026 FIM Harley-Davidson Bagger World Cup. Iannone would join Óscar Gutiérrez and Dimas Ekky Pratama. with his first start being at the Mugello round.

== Nicknames ==
The first notable nickname Iannone had was during the 2010 Misano Circuit Moto2 race where he wore a helmet inspired by the Incredible Hulk. The writing on the back of the helmet read "The Incredible Iannhulk". In 2011, Iannone sported the nickname "Crazy Joe" on the back of his leathers, a nickname his friends had given him - he is called this because of his aggressive racing manoeuvres. In 2012, "Crazy Joe" had changed to "The Maniac Joe" to emphasize the first nickname even further. At Mugello, Iannone used the colour scheme of a nearby fire station and for that race alone gained the nickname "Joe the Firefighter".

During his latter years of motorcycle racing, Iannone was known as "The Maniac".

== Career statistics ==
=== CIV Championship (Campionato Italiano Velocita) ===
==== Races by year ====
(key) (Races in bold indicate pole position; races in italics indicate fastest lap)

| Year | Class | Bike | 1 | 2 | 3 | 4 | 5 | Pos | Pts |
|---|---|---|---|---|---|---|---|---|---|
| 2004 | 125cc | Aprilia | MUG; Ret | IMO; Ret | VAL1; Ret | MIS; 5 | VAL2; Ret | 20th | 11 |

=== Grand Prix motorcycle racing ===
==== By season ====
| Season | Class | Motorcycle | Type | Team | Race | Win | Podium | Pole | FLap | Pts | Plcd |
|---|---|---|---|---|---|---|---|---|---|---|---|
| 2005 | 125cc | Aprilia | Aprilia RS 125 | Abruzzo Racing Team | 16 | 0 | 0 | 0 | 0 | 20 | 20th |
| 2006 | 125cc | Aprilia | Aprilia RS 125 | TicinoHosting Campetella Junior Team | 11 | 0 | 0 | 0 | 0 | 15 | 22nd |
| 2007 | 125cc | Aprilia | Aprilia RS 125 | WTR Blauer USA | 17 | 0 | 0 | 0 | 0 | 26 | 20th |
| 2008 | 125cc | Aprilia | Aprilia RSV 125 | I.C. Team | 17 | 1 | 1 | 1 | 0 | 106 | 10th |
| 2009 | 125cc | Aprilia | Aprilia RSA 125 | Ongetta Team I.S.P.A | 16 | 3 | 4 | 2 | 1 | 125.5 | 7th |
| 2010 | Moto2 | Speed Up | FTR Moto M210 | Fimco Speed Up | 17 | 3 | 8 | 5 | 6 | 199 | **3rd** |
| 2011 | Moto2 | Suter | Suter MMXI | Speed Master | 17 | 3 | 6 | 0 | 7 | 177 | **3rd** |
| 2012 | Moto2 | Speed Up | Speed Up S12 | Speed Master | 17 | 2 | 5 | 0 | 0 | 194 | **3rd** |
| 2013 | MotoGP | Ducati | Ducati GP13 | Pramac Racing | 16 | 0 | 0 | 0 | 0 | 57 | 12th |
| 2014 | MotoGP | Ducati | Ducati GP14 | Pramac Racing | 17 | 0 | 0 | 0 | 0 | 102 | 10th |
| 2015 | MotoGP | Ducati | Ducati GP15 | Ducati Team | 18 | 0 | 3 | 1 | 1 | 188 | 5th |
| 2016 | MotoGP | Ducati | Ducati GP16 | Ducati Team | 14 | 1 | 4 | 1 | 2 | 112 | 9th |
| 2017 | MotoGP | Suzuki | Suzuki GSX-RR | Team Suzuki Ecstar | 18 | 0 | 0 | 0 | 0 | 70 | 13th |
| 2018 | MotoGP | Suzuki | Suzuki GSX-RR | Team Suzuki Ecstar | 18 | 0 | 4 | 0 | 0 | 133 | 10th |
| 2019 | MotoGP | Aprilia | Aprilia RS-GP | Aprilla Racing Team Gresini | 17 | 0 | 0 | 0 | 0 | 43 | 16th |
| 2024 | MotoGP | Ducati | Ducati GP23 | Pertamina Enduro VR46 Racing Team | 1 | 0 | 0 | 0 | 0 | 0 | 27th |
| Total | | | | | **247** | **13** | **35** | **10** | **17** | **1567.5** | |

==== By class ====
| Class | Seasons | 1st GP | 1st Pod | 1st Win | Race | Win | Podiums | Pole | FLap | Pts | WChmp |
|---|---|---|---|---|---|---|---|---|---|---|---|
| 125cc | 2005–2009 | 2005 Spain | 2008 China | 2008 China | 77 | 4 | 5 | 3 | 1 | 292.5 | 0 |
| Moto2 | 2010–2012 | 2010 Qatar | 2010 Italy | 2010 Italy | 51 | 8 | 19 | 5 | 13 | 570 | 0 |
| MotoGP | 2013–2019, 2024 | 2013 Qatar | 2015 Qatar | 2016 Austria | 119 | 1 | 11 | 2 | 3 | 705 | 0 |
| Total | 2005–2019, 2024 | | | | **247** | **13** | **35** | **10** | **17** | **1567.5** | **0** |

==== Races by year ====
(key) (Races in bold indicate pole position, races in italics indicate fastest lap)

| Year | Class | Bike | 1 | 2 | 3 | 4 | 5 | 6 | 7 | 8 | 9 | 10 | 11 | 12 | 13 | 14 | 15 | 16 | 17 | 18 | 19 | 20 | Pos | Pts |
|---|---|---|---|---|---|---|---|---|---|---|---|---|---|---|---|---|---|---|---|---|---|---|---|---|
| 2005 | 125cc | Aprilia | SPA; 21 | POR; 26 | CHN; 18 | FRA; 23 | ITA; 16 | CAT; 11 | NED; 26 | GBR; Ret | GER; Ret | CZE; 11 | JPN; 13 | MAL; 18 | QAT; 19 | AUS; Ret | TUR; 10 | VAL; 15 | | | | | 20th | 20 |
| 2006 | 125cc | Aprilia | SPA; 15 | QAT; 13 | TUR; 15 | CHN; 13 | FRA; 9 | ITA; DSQ | CAT; 17 | NED; Ret | GBR; 17 | GER; 24 | CZE | MAL; Ret | AUS | JPN | POR | VAL | | | | | 22nd | 15 |
| 2007 | 125cc | Aprilia | QAT; 15 | SPA; 12 | TUR; 9 | CHN; 11 | FRA; Ret | ITA; Ret | CAT; 17 | GBR; 15 | NED; 20 | GER; 24 | CZE; Ret | RSM; 14 | POR; 18 | JPN; 10 | AUS; 20 | MAL; 18 | VAL; 20 | | | | 20th | 26 |
| 2008 | 125cc | Aprilia | QAT; 14 | SPA; 18 | POR; 11 | CHN; 1 | FRA; 5 | ITA; 12 | CAT; Ret | GBR; Ret | NED; 8 | GER; 11 | CZE; 9 | RSM; 6 | INP; Ret | JPN; Ret | AUS; 4 | **MAL**; 10 | VAL; 6 | | | | 10th | 106 |
| 2009 | 125cc | Aprilia | QAT; 1 | **JPN**; 1 | SPA; 19 | FRA; 7 | ITA; Ret | CAT; 1 | NED; 4 | GER; 7 | GBR; Ret | **CZE**; 3 | INP; Ret | RSM; Ret | POR; Ret | AUS; 8 | MAL; 8 | VAL; Ret | | | | | 7th | 125.5 |
| 2010 | Moto2 | Speed Up | QAT; 19 | SPA; Ret | FRA; 4 | **ITA**; 1 | GBR; 12 | **NED**; 1 | **CAT**; 13 | **GER**; 2 | CZE; 3 | INP; 4 | RSM; Ret | **ARA**; 1 | JPN; 13 | MAL; 3 | AUS; 3 | POR; 21 | VAL; 2 | | | | 3rd | 199 |
| 2011 | Moto2 | Suter | QAT; 2 | SPA; 1 | POR; 13 | FRA; Ret | CAT; 15 | GBR; 16 | NED; 12 | ITA; 5 | GER; 14 | CZE; 1 | INP; 11 | RSM; 3 | ARA; 2 | JPN; 1 | AUS; 8 | MAL; 9 | VAL; 11 | | | | 3rd | 177 |
| 2012 | Moto2 | Speed Up | QAT; 2 | SPA; 14 | POR; 5 | FRA; 4 | CAT; 1 | GBR; 4 | NED; 2 | GER; 16 | ITA; 1 | INP; 9 | CZE; 4 | RSM; 3 | ARA; 4 | JPN; 17 | MAL; 5 | AUS; Ret | VAL; 11 | | | | 3rd | 194 |
| 2013 | MotoGP | Ducati | QAT; 9 | AME; 10 | SPA; Ret | FRA; 11 | ITA; 13 | CAT; Ret | NED; 13 | GER; DNS | USA | INP; 11 | CZE; 9 | GBR; 11 | RSM; Ret | ARA; 10 | MAL; Ret | AUS; 8 | JPN; 14 | VAL; Ret | | | 12th | 57 |
| 2014 | MotoGP | Ducati | QAT; 10 | AME; 7 | ARG; 6 | SPA; Ret | FRA; Ret | ITA; 7 | CAT; 9 | NED; 6 | GER; 5 | INP; Ret | CZE; 5 | GBR; 8 | RSM; 5 | ARA; Ret | JPN; 6 | AUS; Ret | MAL; DNS | VAL; 22 | | | 10th | 102 |
| 2015 | MotoGP | Ducati | QAT; 3 | AME; 5 | ARG; 4 | SPA; 6 | FRA; 5 | **ITA**; 2 | CAT; 4 | NED; 4 | GER; 5 | INP; 5 | CZE; 4 | GBR; 8 | RSM; 7 | ARA; 4 | JPN; Ret | AUS; 3 | MAL; Ret | VAL; Ret | | | 5th | 188 |
| 2016 | MotoGP | Ducati | QAT; Ret | ARG; Ret | AME; 3 | SPA; 7 | FRA; Ret | ITA; 3 | CAT; Ret | NED; 5 | GER; 5 | **AUT**; 1 | CZE; 8 | GBR; Ret | RSM; DNS | ARA; WD | JPN | AUS | MAL; Ret | VAL; 3 | | | 9th | 112 |
| 2017 | MotoGP | Suzuki | QAT; Ret | ARG; 16 | AME; 7 | SPA; Ret | FRA; 10 | ITA; 10 | CAT; 16 | NED; 9 | GER; Ret | CZE; 19 | AUT; 11 | GBR; Ret | RSM; Ret | ARA; 12 | JPN; 4 | AUS; 6 | MAL; 17 | VAL; 6 | | | 13th | 70 |
| 2018 | MotoGP | Suzuki | QAT; 9 | ARG; 8 | AME; 3 | SPA; 3 | FRA; Ret | ITA; 4 | CAT; 10 | NED; 11 | GER; 12 | CZE; 10 | AUT; 13 | GBR; C | RSM; 8 | ARA; 3 | THA; 11 | JPN; Ret | AUS; 2 | MAL; Ret | VAL; Ret | | 10th | 133 |
| 2019 | MotoGP | Aprilia | QAT; 14 | ARG; 17 | AME; 12 | SPA; DNS | FRA; Ret | ITA; 15 | CAT; 11 | NED; 10 | GER; 13 | CZE; 17 | AUT; 16 | GBR; 10 | RSM; DNS | ARA; 11 | THA; 15 | JPN; Ret | AUS; 6 | MAL; DSQ | VAL; DSQ | | 16th | 43 |
| 2024 | MotoGP | Ducati | QAT | POR | AME | SPA | FRA | CAT | ITA | NED | GER | GBR | AUT | ARA | RSM | EMI | INA | JPN | AUS | THA | MAL; 17 | SLD | 27th | 0 |

=== Superbike World Championship ===
==== By season ====
| Season | Motorcycle | Team | Race | Win | Podium | Pole | FLap | Pts | Plcd |
|---|---|---|---|---|---|---|---|---|---|
| 2024 | Ducati Panigale V4 R | Team GoEleven | 36 | 1 | 5 | 0 | 2 | 231 | 8th |
| 2025 | Ducati Panigale V4 R | Team GoEleven | 31 | 0 | 3 | 0 | 0 | 166 | 9th |
| Total | | | **67** | **1** | **8** | **0** | **2** | **397** | |

==== Races by year ====
(key) (Races in bold indicate pole position) (Races in italics indicate fastest lap)

| Year | Bike | 1 | | | 2 | | | 3 | | | 4 | | | 5 | | | 6 | | | 7 | | | 8 | | | 9 | | | 10 | | | 11 | | | 12 | | | Pos | Pts |
| Year | Bike | R1 | SR | R2 | R1 | SR | R2 | R1 | SR | R2 | R1 | SR | R2 | R1 | SR | R2 | R1 | SR | R2 | R1 | SR | R2 | R1 | SR | R2 | R1 | SR | R2 | R1 | SR | R2 | R1 | SR | R2 | R1 | SR | R2 | Pos | Pts |
|---|---|---|---|---|---|---|---|---|---|---|---|---|---|---|---|---|---|---|---|---|---|---|---|---|---|---|---|---|---|---|---|---|---|---|---|---|---|---|---|
| 2024 | Ducati | AUS; 3 | AUS; 14 | AUS; 4 | BAR; 4 | BAR; 2 | BAR; Ret | NED; Ret | NED; 15 | NED; 4 | MIS; 7 | MIS; 5 | MIS; 11 | GBR; 11 | GBR; 7 | GBR; Ret | CZE; 3 | CZE; 7 | CZE; 8 | POR; Ret | POR; 9 | POR; 4 | FRA; 5 | FRA; 11 | FRA; 12 | ITA; Ret | ITA; 3 | ITA; Ret | ARA; 1 | ARA; 4 | ARA; 4 | EST; 9 | EST; 9 | EST; 8 | SPA; 12 | SPA; 7 | SPA; 4 | 8th | 231 |
| 2025 | Ducati | AUS; 6 | AUS; 2 | AUS; 3 | POR; 7 | POR; 12 | POR; Ret | NED; Ret | NED; Ret | NED; 9 | ITA; 4 | ITA; 8 | ITA; 14 | CZE; WD | CZE; WD | CZE; WD | EMI; Ret | EMI; 17 | EMI; Ret | GBR; 10 | GBR; 9 | GBR; 7 | HUN; 13 | HUN; DNS | HUN; DNS | FRA; Ret | FRA; 6 | FRA; 16 | ARA; 6 | ARA; 4 | ARA; 4 | POR; 8 | POR; 5 | POR; 12 | SPA; 4 | SPA; 3 | SPA; 7 | 9th | 166 |

=== FIM Harley-Davidson Bagger World Cup ===
==== Races by year ====
(key) (Races in bold indicate pole position, races in italics indicate fastest lap)

| Year | 1 | | 2 | | 3 | | 4 | | 5 | | 6 | | Pos | Pts |
| Year | R1 | R2 | R1 | R2 | R1 | R2 | R1 | R2 | R1 | R2 | R1 | R2 | Pos | Pts |
|---|---|---|---|---|---|---|---|---|---|---|---|---|---|---|
| 2026 | USA | USA | ITA; 4 | ITA; 1 | NED; 3 | NED; 2 | GBR; 4 | GBR; 6 | SPA; 1 | SPA; 1 | AUT; Ret | AUT; 6 | 4th | 157 |
