= Marco Durante (physicist) =

Italian physicist

- Marco Durante in Cave M - 2025 - J. Hosan
- Born: 1965 (age 60–61)
- Education: University of Naples Federico II
- Scientific career
- Fields: Radiation biophysics, space radiation
- Workplaces: GSI Helmhotzzentrum für Schwerionenforschung, Technische Universität Darmstadt; University of Naples Federico II

Marco Durante (born in 1965 in Naples, Italy) is an Italian physicist known for his contributions to radiation biophysics, space radiation protection, and charged particle cancer therapy. He is Director of the Biophysics Department at the GSI Helmhotzzentrum für Schwerionenforschung, in Darmstadt, Germany, Full Professor of Physics at Technische Universität Darmstadt and part-time at the University of Naples Federico II in Italy.

== Education ==
Durante obtained a Laurea (Master’s degree) in physics from the University of Naples Federico II in 1988, and completed a PhD in physics at the same institution in 1992, performing part of the research activity at the Lawrence Berkeley Laboratory in Berkeley.

== Career ==
Since 2008, Durante has been Full Professor of Physics at Technische Universität Darmstadt, Germany. In 2018, he was appointed Director of the Biophysics Department at the GSI Helmholtzzentrum für Schwerionenforschung in Darmstadt.

Previously, Durante served as Director of the Trento Institute for Fundamental Physics and Applications (TIFPA) of the Italian National Institute for Nuclear Physics (INFN) from 2015 to 2018. He had earlier been Research Fellow at the Frankfurt Institute for Advanced Studies (FIAS) from 2009 to 2014.

From 2005 to 2013, he was Adjunct Professor in the Faculty of Sciences at Temple University in Philadelphia, United States. Before that, he served as Associate Professor of Physics at the University of Naples Federico II from 2000 to 2006.

During his early career, Durante held several international research fellowships and visiting appointments. He was Visiting Scientist at the National Institute for Radiological Sciences in Chiba, Japan, from 2002 to 2003, and previously from 1997 to 1998. He was also Visiting Scientist at the University Space Research Association at the NASA Lyndon B. Johnson Space Center in Houston, Texas, from 1999 to 2000, and earlier a postdoctoral researcher at the same center from 1994 to 1995.

He served as President of the International Association for Radiation Research (IARR) and as a member of advisory committees for organizations such as the European Space Agency (ESA) and international particle accelerator research centers. He also participates on editorial boards of multiple scientific journals. He currently serves as President of the Particle Therapy Co-Operative Group.

== Research ==
Durante’s research spans radiation biophysics, medical physics, particle radiotherapy, and space radiation protection. He has co-authored hundreds of peer-reviewed scientific papers on the physical and biological effects of high-energy charged particles, biodosimetry methods, and optimization of particle therapy. His work has contributed to improved understanding of how heavy ions and protons interact with biological tissues, leading to advanced strategies in cancer particle therapy and radioprotective measures for spaceflight.

During his post-doc at NIRS in Japan, Durante demonstrated that heavy charged particles such as carbon ions result in reduced lymphocyte damage compared with conventional X-ray therapy, an effect linked to dosimetric advantages of particle beams. Subsequent studies have confirmed that particle therapy reduces lymphopenia compared to conventional X-ray treatments. His Kaplan Lecture 2023 summarizes this work and its implications for combining particle therapy with immunotherapy.

=== Impact on Particle Therapy and Radiation Oncology ===
Durante is a leading voice in the field of particle therapy, including research into advanced heavy ion modalities and high-dose-rate techniques such as FLASH radiotherapy. In 2020 he was awarded a European Research Council (ERC) Advanced Grant to study therapeutic applications of radioactive ion beams and in 2025 he got a second ERC to support innovative research on ultra-high-dose-rate heavy ion beams aimed at enhancing treatment efficacy while minimizing healthy tissue damage. The results of the first ERC project led to the first demonstration of tumor treatment in an animal model with high-energy radioactive ions. He is also very active in mathematical modelling of radiation effects. The agent-based model of radiation-induced fibrosis, developed by Durante with his Ph.D. student Niccolo’ Cogno in collaboration with the University of Surrey, was selected as one of the Top 10 breakthrough in Physics 2024 according to the Institute of Physics (IOP).

=== Space Radiation Protection ===
Beyond cancer therapy, Durante’s work includes experimental and theoretical studies of cosmic radiation and shielding effectiveness, advancing risk assessment for human space exploration. He performed several experiments on space radiation shielding and radiobiology at the NASA Space Radiation Laboratory (NSRL) in the USA and has promoted the construction of the first galactic cosmic ray simulator in Europe, installed at the GSI accelerator. He has collaborated on analyses of heavy ion carcinogenesis and spaceflight radiation effects, and is working in the Task Group 115 of the International Council for Radiological Protection (ICRP) to harmonize the dose limits for astronauts issued by different space agencies.

== Awards ==
- British Institute of Radiology, Medal for Outstanding International Achievement, 2025
- Norwegian Academy of Sciences, Ellen Gleditsch award 2024
- International Association for Radiation Research 2023 Henry S. Kaplan award
- Radiation Research Society 2020 Gioacchino Failla award
- Bacq & Alexander award of the European Radiation Research Society 2013 (ERRS).
- European Physical Society award for Applied Nuclear Science and Nuclear Methods in Medicine from the European Physics Society (2013).
- 8th Warren K. Sinclair Award of the US National Academy of Sciences (2011).
- Galileo Galilei prize from the European Federation of Organizations for Medical Physics (2005).

== Publications ==
Durante is co-author of over 500 papers in peer-reviewed scientific journals (Scopus h-index=72), including high-impact factor reviews on Nature Journal, Lancet Oncology, PNAS, and Reviews of Modern Physics, and is member of the Editorial Board of several of them.

=== Selected recent publications ===
- N. Cogno, R. Bauer, M. Durante, Mechanistic model of radiotherapy-induced lung fibrosis using coupled 3D agent-based and Monte Carlo simulations, Commun. Med. 4 (2024) 16. Top 10 Breakthroughs of the Year in Physics for 2024 ()
- C. Graeff, L. Volz, M. Durante, Emerging technologies for cancer therapy using accelerated particles, Prog. Part. Nucl. Phys. 131 (2023) 104046.
- M.-C. Vozenin, J. Bourhis, M. Durante, Towards clinical translation of FLASH radiotherapy, Nat. Rev. Clin. Oncol. 19 (2022) 791–803.
- M. Durante, J. Debus, J.S. Loeffler, Physics and biomedical challenges of cancer therapy with accelerated heavy ions, Nat. Rev. Phys. 3 (2021) 777–790.
- M. Durante, A. Golubev, W.-Y. Park, C. Trautmann, Applied nuclear physics at the new high-energy particle accelerator facilities, Phys. Rep. 800 (2019) 1–37.
- M. Durante, R. Orecchia, J.S. Loeffler, Charged-particle therapy in cancer: clinical uses and future perspectives, Nat. Rev. Clin. Oncol. 14 (2017) 483–495.
- F. Natale, A. Rapp, W. Yu, A. Maiser, H. Harz, A. Scholl, S. Grulich, T. Anton, D. Hörl, W. Chen, M. Durante, G. Taucher-Scholz, H. Leonhardt, M.C. Cardoso, Identification of the elementary structural units of the DNA damage response, Nat. Commun. 8 (2017).
- R.L. Hughson, A. Helm, M. Durante, Heart in space: effect of the extraterrestrial environment on the cardiovascular system, Nat. Rev. Cardiol. 15 (2017)
- J. Mirsch, F. Tommasino, A. Frohns, S. Conrad, M. Durante, M. Scholz, T. Friedrich, M. Löbrich, Direct measurement of the 3-dimensional DNA lesion distribution induced by energetic charged particles in a mouse model tissue, Proc. Natl. Acad. Sci. USA. 112 (2015) 12396–12401.
- Durante M., Reppingen N., Held KD. Immunologically augmented cancer treatment using modern radiotherapy Trends Mol. Med. 19 (2013) 565-582.
- Loeffler JS., Durante M. Charged particle therapy - optimization, challenges and future directions Nat. Rev. Clin. Oncol. 10 (2013) 411-424.
- Pignalosa D., Durante M. Overcoming resistance of cancer stem cells Lancet Oncol. 13 (2012) e187- e188.
- Durante M., Cucinotta FA. Physical basis of radiation protection in space travel Rev. Mod. Phys. 83 (2011) 1245-1281.
- Newhauser WD., Durante M. Assessing the risk of second malignancies after modern radiotherapy Nat. Rev. Cancer 11 (2011) 438-448.
- Durante M., Loeffler JS. Charged particles in radiation oncology Nat. Rev. Clin. Oncol. 7 (2010) 37- 43.
- Jakob B., Splinter J., Durante M., Taucher-Scholz G. Live cell microscopy analysis of radiation-induced DNA double-strand break motion Proc. Natl. Acad. Sci. USA 106 (2009) 3172-3177.
- Durante M., Cucinotta FA. Heavy ion carcinogenesis and human space exploration Nat. Rev. Cancer 8 (2008) 465-472.
- Cucinotta FA., Durante M. Cancer risk from exposure to galactic cosmic rays: implications for space exploration by human beings Lancet Oncol. 7 (2006) 431-435
