= Lincoln Gilding =

Australian motorcycle racer (b. 1992)

- Nationality: Australian
- Born: 16 March 1992 (age 34); Buderim, Australia
- Bike number: 75
Motorcycle racing career statistics
Moto3 World Championship
Active years	2012
Manufacturers	Honda
2012 championship position	NC (0 pts)
Starts / Wins / Podiums / Poles / F. laps / Points; 1 / 0 / 0 / 0 / 0 / 0

Lincoln Gilding (born 16 March 1992) is an Australian motorcycle racer. In 2012 he participated in the Australian Grand Prix at Phillip Island. He also competed in the 2013 Spanish CEV Repsol Championship on board a KTM Moto3 for Motorrika Chronos Corse Team.

== Career statistics ==
=== FIM CEV Moto3 Championship ===
==== Races by year ====
(key) (Races in bold indicate pole position; races in italics indicate fastest lap)

Year	Bike	1	2	3	4	5	6	7	8	9	Pos	Pts
2013	KTM	CAT1; 12	CAT2; Ret	ARA; 23	ALB1; 17	ALB2	NAV	VAL1	VAL1	JER	33rd	4

=== Grand Prix motorcycle racing ===
==== By season ====
Season	Class	Motorcycle	Team	Number	Race	Win	Podium	Pole	FLap	Pts	Plcd
2012	Moto3	Honda	K1 Racing	75	1	0	0	0	0	0	NC
Total					**1**	**0**	**0**	**0**	**0**	**0**	

==== Races by year ====
(key)

Year	Class	Bike	1	2	3	4	5	6	7	8	9	10	11	12	13	14	15	16	17	Pos.	Pts
2012	Moto3	Honda	QAT	SPA	POR	FRA	CAT	GBR	NED	GER	ITA	INP	CZE	RSM	ARA	JPN	MAL	AUS; 23	VAL	NC	0
