= 2013 FIM CEV Moto3 International Championship =

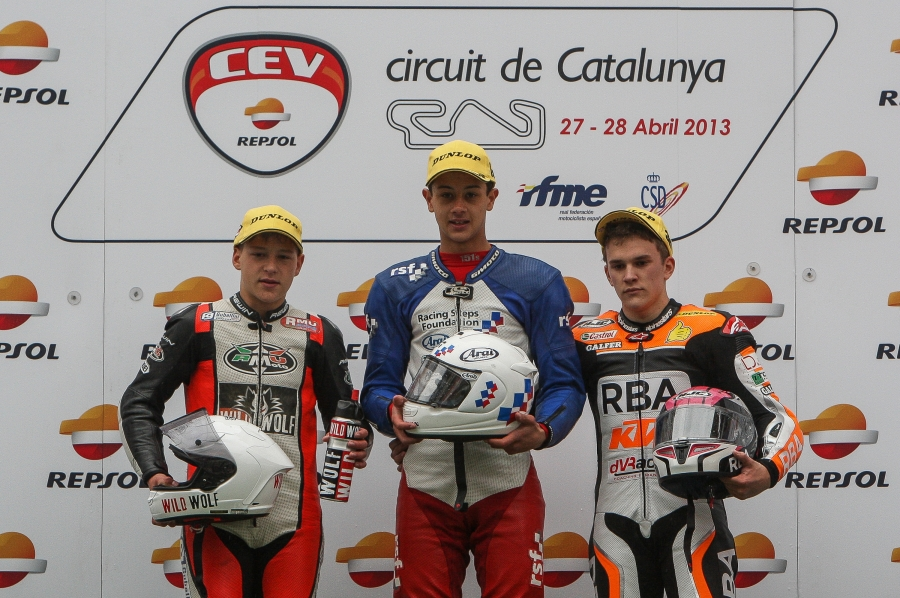
Podio CEV Moto3 Catalan1

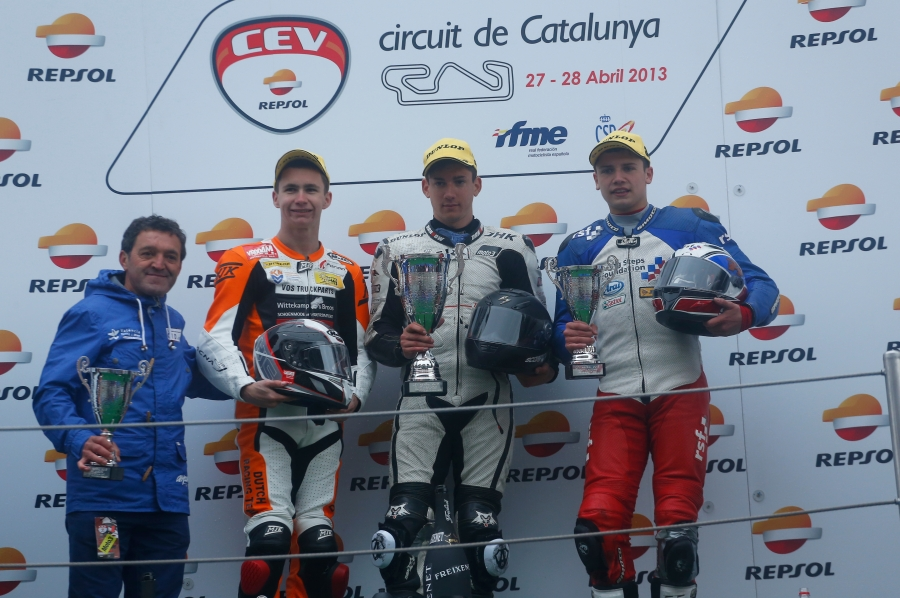
Podio CEV Moto3 Catalan2

The 2013 CEV Moto3 International Championship was the second season using Moto3 bikes, the title was claimed by 14-year-old Frenchman Fabio Quartararo by a single point from Marcos Ramírez. María Herrera became the first female rider to win a CEV race.

== Calendar ==
2013 calendar
Round	Date	Circuit	Pole position	Fastest lap	Race winner	Winning team	Sources
1	28 April	(Spain) Catalunya	(Spain) Adrián Martín	(United Kingdom) Wayne Ryan	(United Kingdom) Wayne Ryan	KRP/Racing Steps Foundation	
1	28 April	(Spain) Catalunya	(Spain) Adrián Martín	(Germany) Luca Amato	(Spain) Adrián Martín	O.I.D. Team Aspar	
2	26 May	(Spain) Aragon	(Spain) Adrián Martín	(Spain) Jorge Navarro	(Spain) María Herrera	Junior Team Estrella Galicia 0,0	
3	23 June	(Spain) Albacete	(Germany) Luca Amato	(Germany) Luca Amato	(Spain) Albert Arenas	Team Stylobike	
4	8 September	(Spain) Albacete	(Italy) Andrea Migno	(Spain) Alejandro Medina	(Spain) Adrián Martín	O.I.D. Aspar Team	
5	22 September	(Spain) Navarra	(France) Fabio Quartararo	(Spain) Marcos Ramírez	(Spain) María Herrera	Junior Team Estrella Galicia 0,0	
6	17 November	(Spain) Valencia	(France) Fabio Quartararo	(France) Fabio Quartararo	(France) Fabio Quartararo	Wild Wolf Racing	
6	17 November	(Spain) Valencia	(France) Fabio Quartararo	(Spain) Adrián Martín	(France) Fabio Quartararo	Wild Wolf Racing	
7	24 November	(Spain) Jerez	(France) Fabio Quartararo	(France) Fabio Quartararo	(France) Fabio Quartararo	Wild Wolf Racing	

== Teams and Riders ==
Team	Constructor	No.	Rider	Rounds
(Spain) Team Stratos	Ariane	44	(Spain) Arón Canet	6–7
(Andorra) Cardelús Racing Team	FTR Honda	99	(Andorra) Xavier Cardelús	All
(Germany) Caretta Technology-RTG	FTR Honda	72	(Germany) Christoph Beinlich	7
(Germany) Caretta Technology-RTG	FTR Honda	79	(Germany) Maximilian Kappler	6–7
(Australia) Corza Racing FTR	FTR Honda	52	(Australia) Corey Turner	6–7
(Netherlands) Dutch Racing Team	FTR Honda	15	(Netherlands) Bryan Schouten	All
(Italy) Elle2 Ciatti	FTR Honda	3	(Czech Republic) Miroslav Popov	4
(Italy) Elle2 Ciatti	FTR Honda	39	(Italy) Federico Fuligni	1, 3–4
(Italy) Elle2 Ciatti	FTR Honda	58	(Italy) Manuel Pagliani	3
(Italy) Elle2 Ciatti	FTR Honda	93	(Italy) Lorenzo Petrarca	6–7
(Italy) GMT Racing	FTR Honda	16	(Italy) Andrea Migno	1–4, 6–7
(Spain) Halcourier MS; Halcourier Spiel–Kiste MS	FTR Honda	13	(Italy) Luigi Morciano	1–2
(Spain) Halcourier MS; Halcourier Spiel–Kiste MS	FTR Honda	22	(Germany) Luca Amato	1–2
(Spain) Halcourier MS; Halcourier Spiel–Kiste MS	FTR Honda	49	(Spain) Borja Quero	6
(Spain) Larresport FTR Honda	FTR Honda	52	(Australia) Corey Turner	1–5
(Spain) Team Stylobike	FTR Honda	11	(Spain) Albert Arenas	All
(Italy) Twelve Racing	FTR Honda	67	(Italy) Luca Marini	4
(Spain) Wild Wolf Racing	FTR Honda	20	(France) Fabio Quartararo	All
(France) 2.0 Racing Team	Honda	44	(France) Hugo Casadesus	1–2, 4, 6–7
(Germany) ADAC Sachsen Leistungszentrum	Honda	36	(Germany) Max Enderlein	All
(Germany) ADAC Sachsen Leistungszentrum	Honda	73	(Germany) Klaus Heidel	1–4
(Spain) BMS	Honda	41	(Spain) Marc García	6–7
(France) CIPMoto	Honda	38	(Japan) Tatsuki Suzuki	6–7
(France) CIPMoto	Honda	74	(France) Enzo Boulom	3
(Austria) Cofain Racing Team	Honda	56	(Austria) Thomas Gradinger	6–7
(Spain) Costa Competicion	Honda	18	(Spain) Josep Rodríguez	2
(Spain) Costa Competicion	Honda	27	(Spain) Alexandre Sirerol	All
(Spain) Costa Competicion	Honda	61	(Spain) Montserrat Costa	1–6
Equipe De France	Honda	5	(France) Corentin Perolari	6
Equipe De France	Honda	90	(France) Enzo Boulom	6–7
(Spain) H43 Team Nobby Talasur Blumaq	Honda	43	(Japan) Ren Toba	All
(Spain) H43 Team Nobby Talasur Blumaq	Honda	53	(Spain) Illán Fernandez	3–5
(Spain) H43 Team Nobby Talasur Blumaq	Honda	89	(United Kingdom) Fraser Rogers	1
(France) La Salle Des Moteurs	Honda	68	(France) Christophe Rafael	1–3
(Spain) Larresport Honda	Honda	28	(United Kingdom) Bradley Ray	All
(Spain) Larresport Honda	Honda	64	(Spain) Sara Sánchez	All
(Belgium) LC84 Promotion	Honda	84	(Belgium) Loris Cresson	4, 6–7
(Spain) MR Griful	Honda	10	(Spain) Agusti Levy	1, 3–6
(Australia) Olly Simpson Racing	Honda	45	(Australia) Olly Simpson	1, 3
(France) PP Promotion	Honda	78	(France) Pierre Ginieys	1
(France) PP Promotion	Honda	96	(Belgium) Amaury Jakab	1–4, 7
(Spain) Promoracing	Honda	32	(Argentina) Fausto Grantón	3–5
(Italy) Racing Team AX52	Honda	34	(Italy) Stefano Valtulini	4
(Netherlands) RV Racing	Honda	42	(Netherlands) Jorel Boerboom	6–7
(Spain) Team JJ Saez	Honda	26	(Spain) Daniel Sáez	All
(Spain) Team JJ Saez	Honda	29	(Spain) Juan Jose Nuñez	1–4, 6–7
(Spain) Team Machado	Honda	31	(Spain) Vicente Pérez	4, 6–7
(Spain) Team Quinto	Honda	41	(Spain) Aitor Cremades	1–4
Team Venezuela	Honda	4	(Venezuela) Gabriel Ramos	All
Team Venezuela	Honda	17	(Venezuela) Edgar Gallipoli	All
Team Venezuela	Honda	23	(Venezuela) Marlon Velandia	1–5
Team Venezuela	Honda	97	(Spain) Xavi Vierge	All
(United Kingdom) Watson Work Racing	Honda	81	(United Kingdom) Ryan Watson	All
(France) Cygnet Racing - Furygan	Kalex KTM	95	(France) Jules Danilo	1–4, 7
(Belgium) Marc VDS Racing Team	Kalex KTM	57	(Belgium) Livio Loi	1, 6–7
(France) Provence Moto Sport	Kalex KTM	60	(France) Anthony Dumont	6
(France) Provence Moto Sport	Kalex KTM	90	(France) Enzo Boulom	4
(Netherlands) RW Racing GP	Kalex KTM	59	(Netherlands) Scott Deroue	5–6
(Spain) O.I.D. Team Aspar	Kalex KTM	30	(Spain) David Sanchis	4–7
(Spain) O.I.D. Team Aspar	Kalex KTM	62	(Spain) Adrián Martín	All
(Spain) O.I.D. Team Aspar	Kalex KTM	67	(Italy) Luca Marini	7
(United Kingdom) KRP Racing Steps Foundation	KRP Honda	66	(Spain) Eduardo Alayon	1–4
(United Kingdom) KRP Racing Steps Foundation	KRP Honda	77	(United Kingdom) Kyle Ryde	All
(United Kingdom) KRP Racing Steps Foundation	KRP Honda	98	(United Kingdom) Wayne Ryan	All
(Italy) Carpimotor Team	KTM	8	(Italy) Cristiano Carpi	1
(Spain) DVRacing-RBA	KTM	91	(Argentina) Gabriel Rodrigo	All
(Germany) Freudenberg Racing Team	KTM	94	(Germany) Luca Grünwald	6–7
(Spain) Junior Team Estrella Galicia 0,0	KTM	6	(Spain) María Herrera	All
(Spain) Junior Team Estrella Galicia 0,0	KTM	21	(Italy) Alessio Castelli	All
(Spain) Junior Team Estrella Galicia 0,0	KTM	24	(Spain) Marcos Ramírez	All
(Spain) Junior Team Estrella Galicia 0,0	KTM	69	(India) Sarath Kumar	1
(Spain) / (Japan) H43 Team Nobby Talasur Blumaq	KTM	63	(Japan) Soushi Mihara	4–7
(Russia) Motorrika	KTM	3/33	(Italy) Luigi Morciano	4–6
(Russia) Motorrika	KTM	71	(Australia) Lincoln Gilding	1–3
(Russia) Motorrika	KTM	89	(Italy) Manuel Pagliani	7
(France) Provence Moto Sport	KTM	5	(France) Corentin Perolari	1
(Spain) Team Calvo	KTM	25	(Argentina) Emiliano Lancioni	All
(Spain) Team Calvo	KTM	55	(Spain) Alejandro Medina	All
(Spain) Team Calvo	KTM	87	(Australia) Remy Gardner	1–2, 4–7
(Finland) / (Malaysia) Touchline-SIC-Ajo	KTM	7	(Malaysia) Aizat Malik	All
(Finland) / (Malaysia) Touchline-SIC-Ajo	KTM	80	(Malaysia) Hafiq Azmi	All
(India) Mahindra Racing	Mahindra	12	(Italy) Michael Ruben Rinaldi	4
(India) Mahindra Racing	Mahindra	35	(Italy) Andrea Locatelli	4
(Spain) Stylobike-Mahindra	Mahindra	22	(Germany) Luca Amato	3
(Spain) Cuna De Campeones	MIR Racing	9	(Spain) Jorge Navarro	All
(Spain) MIR Racing	MIR Racing	37	(Spain) Joan Mir	6–7
(Spain) MIR Racing	MIR Racing	40	(Spain) Julián Miralles	7
(Spain) MIR Racing	MIR Racing	49	(Spain) Borja Quero	1–4, 7
(Belgium) Bruno Performance F.C.C. TSR	TSR Honda	84	(Belgium) Loris Cresson	1–2
(Japan) F.C.C. TSR Honda	TSR Honda	51	(Japan) Kenta Fujii	1–3, 5–7
(Japan) Honda Team Asia	TSR Honda	91	(Japan) Hiroki Ono	6

== Championship standings ==
Scoring system

Points are awarded to the top fifteen finishers. A rider has to finish the race to earn points.

Position	**1st**	**2nd**	**3rd**	**4th**	**5th**	**6th**	**7th**	**8th**	**9th**	**10th**	**11th**	**12th**	**13th**	**14th**	**15th**
Points	25	20	16	13	11	10	9	8	7	6	5	4	3	2	1

Pos	Rider	Bike	CAT (Spain)		ARA (Spain)	ALB1 (Spain)	ALB2 (Spain)	NAV (Spain)	VAL (Spain)		JER (Spain)	Pts
1	(France) Fabio Quartararo	FTR Honda	2	6	12	EX	Ret	10	1	1	1	115
2	(Spain) Marcos Ramírez	KTM	4	5	4	3	8	3	4	12	2	114
3	(Spain) Adrián Martín	Kalex KTM	Ret	1	Ret	Ret	1	6	3	3	3	108
4	(Spain) María Herrera	KTM	11	13	1	6	13	1	5	2	Ret	102
5	(Spain) Alejandro Medina	KTM	9	7	3	Ret	3	2	2	4	Ret	101
6	(Spain) Jorge Navarro	MIR Racing	Ret	Ret	2	4	2	4	7	5	5	97
7	(Netherlands) Bryan Schouten	FTR Honda	6	2	Ret	2	4	5	14	10	6	92
8	(Italy) Andrea Migno	FTR Honda	Ret	8	6	Ret	6		6	6	Ret	48
9	(United Kingdom) Wayne Ryan	KRP Honda	1	Ret	9	7	Ret	Ret	Ret	Ret	12	45
10	(Spain) Albert Arenas	FTR Honda	Ret	Ret	8	1	Ret	Ret	23	14	9	42
11	(Argentina) Gabriel Rodrigo	KTM	3	Ret	10	Ret	18	EX	13	9	10	38
12	(Belgium) Livio Loi	Kalex KTM	10	10					8	7	8	37
13	(United Kingdom) Kyle Ryde	KRP Honda	Ret	3	18	18	23	9	15	Ret	7	33
14	(Venezuela) Gabriel Ramos	Honda	Ret	Ret	11	5	Ret	14	35	8	11	31
15	(United Kingdom) Bradley Ray	Honda	7	9	17	10	17	15	Ret	20	13	26
16	(Australia) Remy Gardner	KTM	Ret	20	Ret		5	7	11	Ret	24	25
17	(Malaysia) Hafiq Azmi	KTM	Ret	15	Ret	9	Ret	13	DNS	DNS	4	24
18	(Japan) Kenta Fujii	TSR Honda	8	11	13	11		19	27	30	31	21
19	(France) Jules Danilo	Kalex KTM	Ret	DNS	5	20	10				Ret	17
20	(Germany) Luca Amato	FTR Honda	Ret	4	15							14
20	(Germany) Luca Amato	Mahindra				Ret						14
21	(Italy) Luigi Morciano	KTM	Ret	Ret	7		11	20	21	26		14
22	(Spain) David Sanchis	Kalex KTM					12	8	Ret	Ret	16	12
23	(Germany) Luca Grünwald	KTM							9	11	20	12
24	(United Kingdom) Fraser Rogers	Honda	5	Ret								11
25	(Italy) Luca Marini	FTR Honda					7					11
25	(Italy) Luca Marini	Kalex KTM									14	11
26	(Italy) Manuel Pagliani	Honda				8					15	9
27	(Spain) Xavi Vierge	Honda	Ret	12	Ret	Ret	15	Ret	12	Ret	17	9
28	(Netherlands) Scott Deroue	Kalex KTM						11	Ret	13		8
29	(Italy) Michael Ruben Rinaldi	Mahindra					9					7
30	(Japan) Hiroki Ono	Honda							10	Ret		6
31	(Spain) Eduardo Alayon	KRP Honda	14	Ret	14	Ret	14					6
32	(Spain) Borja Quero	MIR Racing	DNQ	DNQ	20	12	19				Ret	4
32	(Spain) Borja Quero	FTR Honda							34	17		4
33	(Australia) Lincoln Gilding	KTM	12	Ret	23	17						4
34	(Japan) Soushi Mihara	KTM					DNQ	12	20	28	18	4
35	(Australia) Olly Simpson	Honda	13	Ret		26						3
36	(Argentina) Fausto Granton	Honda				13	DNQ	Ret				3
37	(Italy) Alessio Castelli	KTM	Ret	14	19	15	17	24	19	24	25	3
38	(Argentina) Emiliano Lancioni	KTM	20	23	Ret	14	Ret	16	17	Ret	22	2
39	(Malaysia) Aizat Malik	KTM	15	Ret	DNS	24	26	17	28	22	Ret	1
40	(Spain) Joan Mir	MIR Racing							26	15	36	1
	(Andorra) Xavier Cardelús	FTR Honda	Ret	24	16	16	21	21	Ret	29	Ret	0
	(Spain) Daniel Sáez	Honda	19	17	Ret	28	DNQ	32	16	18	30	0
	(Japan) Tatsuki Suzuki	Honda							18	16	29	0
	(Italy) Cristiano Carpi	KTM	16	19								0
	(Italy) Federico Fuligni	FTR Honda	Ret	16		Ret	30					0
	(Italy) Stefano Valtulini	Honda					16					0
	(Spain) Aitor Cremades	Honda	17	Ret	28	20	DNQ					0
	(Spain) Sara Sánchez	Honda	18	18	25	22	Ret	24	33	31	35	0
	(Germany) Max Enderlein	Honda	Ret	22	21	Ret	20	22	Ret	19	19	0
	(Germany) Klaus Heidel	Honda	DNQ	DNQ	27	19	22					0
	(Germany) Maximilian Kappler	FTR Honda							22	21	28	0
	(Japan) Ren Toba	Honda	21	25	24	29	DNQ	30	DNQ	DNQ	DNQ	0
	(Belgium) Loris Cresson	TSR Honda	Ret	21	29							0
	(Belgium) Loris Cresson	Honda					28		31	Ret	DNQ	0
	(Spain) Josep Rodríguez	Honda			22							0
	(France) Enzo Boulom	Honda				DNQ			24	23	27	0
	(France) Enzo Boulom	Kalex KTM					27					0
	(Spain) Illán Fernandez	Honda				23	DNQ	27				0
	(Venezuela) Marlon Velandia	Honda	Ret	Ret	Ret	DNQ	DNQ	23				0
	(Spain) Vicente Pérez	Honda					DNS		DNQ	DNQ	23	0
	(Italy) Lorenzo Petrarca	FTR Honda							25	25	26	0
	(Venezuela) Edgar Gallipoli	Honda	DNQ	DNQ	34	25	DNQ	25	Ret	Ret	DNQ	0
	(Spain) Alexandre Sirerol	Honda	Ret	Ret	Ret	30	25	29	DNQ	DNQ	33	0
	(United Kingdom) Ryan Watson	Honda	Ret	DNS	26	27	29	26	30	33	DNQ	0
	(France) Hugo Casadesus	Honda	Ret	26	30		DNQ		DNQ	DNQ	DNQ	0
	(Spain) Marc García	Honda							29	27	DNQ	0
	(Spain) Agusti Levy	Honda	DNQ	DNQ		DNQ	DNQ	28	DNQ	DNQ		0
	(Spain) Montserrat Costa	Honda	DNQ	DNQ	35	DNQ	DNQ	31	DNQ	DNQ		0
	(Belgium) Amaury Jakab	Honda	DNQ	DNQ	31	DNQ	DNQ				DNQ	0
	(Australia) Corey Turner	FTR Honda	DNQ	DNQ	32	DNQ	DNQ	Ret	32	32	34	0
	(Spain) Juan Jose Nuñez	Honda	DNQ	DNQ	33	DNQ	DNQ		DNQ	DNQ	DNQ	0
	(Spain) Arón Canet	Ariane							Ret	DNS	37	0
	(Netherlands) Jorel Boerboom	Honda							DNQ	DNQ	38	0
	(France) Corentin Perolari	KTM	Ret	Ret								0
	(France) Corentin Perolari	Honda							DNQ	DNQ		0
	(France) Christophe Rafael	Honda	Ret	Ret	DNQ	DNQ						0
	(Italy) Andrea Locatelli	Mahindra					Ret					0
	(Czech Republic) Miroslav Popov	FTR Honda					Ret					0
	(Austria) Thomas Gradinger	Honda							DNQ	DNQ	DNQ	
	(France) Pierre Ginieys	Honda	DNQ	DNQ								
	(India) Sarath Kumar	KTM	DNQ	DNQ								
	(France) Anthony Dumont	Kalex KTM							DNQ	DNQ		
	(Germany) Christoph Beinlich	FTR Honda									DNQ	
	(Spain) Julián Miralles	MIR Racing									DNQ	
Pos	Rider	Bike	CAT (Spain)		ARA (Spain)	ALB1 (Spain)	ALB2 (Spain)	NAV (Spain)	VAL (Spain)		JER (Spain)	Pts

Colour	Result
Gold	Winner
Silver	Second place
Bronze	Third place
Green	Points classification
Blue	Non-points classification
Blue	Non-classified finish (NC)
Purple	Retired, not classified (Ret)
Red	Did not qualify (DNQ)
Red	Did not pre-qualify (DNPQ)
Black	Disqualified (DSQ)
White	Did not start (DNS)
White	Withdrew (WD)
White	Race cancelled (C)
Blank	Did not practice (DNP)
Blank	Did not arrive (DNA)
Blank	Excluded (EX)

**Bold** – Pole position
Italics – Fastest lap
Source :
