= Aspar Team =

Spanish motorcycle racing team

- 2026 name: Moto2: CFMoto Aspar Team; Moto3: CFMoto Aspar Team
- Base: Spain
- Principal: Ángel Nieto Jr.
- Rider(s): Moto2: 27. Daniel Holgado; 80. David Alonso; Moto3: 28. Máximo Quiles; 95. Marco Morelli
- Motorcycle: Moto2: Kalex Moto2; Moto3: CFMoto Moto3
- Tyres: Moto2: Pirelli; Moto3: Pirelli
- Riders' Championships: 125cc: 2006: Álvaro Bautista; 2007: Gábor Talmácsi; 2009: Julián Simón; 2011: Nicolás Terol; Moto3: 2020: Albert Arenas; 2022: Izan Guevara; 2024: David Alonso; 2026: Máximo Quiles; JuniorGP: 2018: Raúl Fernández; 2020: Izan Guevara; 2021: Daniel Holgado; 2026: Carlos Cano; Moto4 European Cup: 2020: David Alonso; 2023: Máximo Quiles; 2026: Álvaro Lucas
- Teams' Championships: Moto3: 2022; 2024; 2026

Aspar Team (formerly Ángel Nieto Team) is a Grand Prix motorcycle racing team from Spain, competing in the Moto2 and Moto3.

== History ==
The team was created by former world champion Jorge Martínez in 1992, when he was still riding a Honda RS125R. For 1993 Martínez expanded his operations into the 250cc class debuting with Juan Borja. For the next two seasons the Aspar team switched to Yamaha TZ125 bikes leaving the 250cc division. In 1996 Aspar started an 18-year relationship with Aprilia; in those years he fielded riders like Fonsi Nieto and Arnaud Vincent before entering the 250cc class again, in 2000 with Alex Debón. Between 2006 and 2011 the Aspar team won four World Championship titles in the 125cc class with Álvaro Bautista, Gábor Talmácsi, Julián Simón and Nicolás Terol. Riders that competed with the team in the 250cc class included Toni Elías, Alex de Angelis, Sebastián Porto and Randy de Puniet.

In the 2010 season the Aspar team entered the MotoGP class with Héctor Barberá, who finished in twelfth place aboard a Ducati Desmosedici GP10. Simón finished in second place in the inaugural Moto2 campaign, with teammate Mike Di Meglio finishing in twentieth place. Both riders started the season on Honda-powered RSV Motors frames, switching to a Suter chassis after two races. Nicolás Terol finished in second place in the 125cc class while his teammate Bradley Smith finished fourth, both riding Aprilia RSA 125 motorcycles.

Barberá remained with the team for 2011, recording a best result of 6th at the Spanish Grand Prix. The team expanded to two bikes in 2012, switching from Ducati to ART. Aleix Espargaró and Randy de Puniet dominated the recently created CRT (Claiming Rule Teams) class for two straight years. In 2014, Aspar entered two Honda bikes, after hiring former World Champion Nicky Hayden to partner Hiroshi Aoyama. The duo scored points regularly, but Espargaró claimed a 3rd straight title in the CRT class with Forward Racing. Irishman Eugene Laverty joined the team in 2015, the last year for Hayden in the World Championship before switching to the Superbike World Championship.

Before the 2018 season began, the team changed their name from Aspar Racing Team to Ángel Nieto Team, as a tribute by former team principal Jorge Fernandez to his late compatriot Ángel Nieto. The team also announced Ángel's son Gelete as the new team principal. At the start of the 2020 season, the team returned to its original name.

The team joined the newly formed MotoE World Championship in 2019 with Nicolás Terol and María Herrera.

Aspar secured their first world championship since 2011 in 2020 with Albert Arenas in the Moto3 class. They then won Moto3 in 2022 with Izan Guevara and again with David Alonso in 2024. In that season, Alonso set the record for most overall Moto3 wins, most consecutive Moto3 wins, and most wins in a single season across all classes.

In 2024, the team began a partnership with Chinese motorcycle manufacturer CFMoto, which has since been extended until 2031.

== Results ==
| Year | Class | Team name | Motorcycle | No. | Riders | Races | Wins | Podiums | Poles | F. laps | Points | Pos. |
|---|---|---|---|---|---|---|---|---|---|---|---|---|
| 1992 | 125cc | Coronas Elf | Honda RS125R | 6 | (Spain) Jorge Martínez | 13 | 1 | 2 | 0 | 0 | 83 | 7th |
| 1992 | 125cc | Coronas Elf | Honda RS125R | 11 | (Switzerland) Heinz Lüthi | 13 | 0 | 0 | 0 | 0 | 1 | 22nd |
| 1992 | 125cc | Coronas Aspar | Honda RS125R | 64 | (Spain) Juan Borja | 1 | 0 | 0 | 0 | 0 | 0 | NC |
| 1993 | 250cc | Team Aspar | Honda RS250R | 30 | (Spain) Juan Borja | 12 | 0 | 0 | 0 | 0 | 5 | 29th |
| 1993 | 250cc | Team Aspar | Honda RS250R | 45 | (Spain) Jorge Martínez | 1 | 0 | 0 | 0 | 0 | 0 | NC |
| 1993 | 250cc | Team Aspar | Honda RS250R | 36 | (Spain) Pere Riba Cabana | 5 (6) | 0 | 0 | 0 | 0 | 0 | NC |
| 1993 | 125cc | Team Aspar | Honda RS125R | 6 | (Spain) Jorge Martínez | 13 | 0 | 0 | 0 | 0 | 74 | 8th |
| 1994 | 125cc | Team Aspar | Yamaha TZ125 | 5 | (Spain) Jorge Martínez | 14 | 1 | 3 | 0 | 0 | 135 | 6th |
| 1994 | 125cc | Team Aspar | Yamaha TZ125 | 19 | (Japan) Yoshiaki Katoh | 7 | 0 | 0 | 0 | 0 | 8 | 26th |
| 1994 | 125cc | Team Aspar | Yamaha TZ125 | | (Spain) Juan Enrique Maturana | 6 | 0 | 0 | 0 | 0 | 4 | 32nd |
| 1995 | 125cc | Team Aspar Cepsa | Yamaha TZ125 | 5 | (Spain) Jorge Martínez | 13 | 0 | 0 | 0 | 0 | 27 | 18th |
| 1995 | 125cc | Team Aspar Cepsa | Yamaha TZ125 | 19 | (Japan) Yoshiaki Katoh | 12 | 0 | 0 | 0 | 0 | 55 | 14th |
| 1995 | 125cc | Team Aspar Cepsa | Yamaha TZ125 | 51 | (Spain) Ángel Nieto Jr. | 1 | 0 | 0 | 0 | 0 | 0 | NC |
| 1996 | 125cc | Team Aspar | Aprilia RS125R | | (Spain) Jorge Martínez | 15 | 0 | 2 | 3 | 1 | 131 | 5th |
| 1996 | 125cc | Team Aspar | Aprilia RS125R | | (France) Arnaud Vincent | 1 | 0 | 0 | 0 | 0 | 0 | NC |
| 2000 | 250cc | CC Valencia Airtel Aspar | Aprilia RSV 250 | 30 | (Spain) Alex Debón | 16 | 0 | 0 | 0 | 0 | 32 | 15th |
| 2000 | 250cc | CC Valencia Airtel Aspar | Aprilia RSV 250 | 20 | (Spain) Jerónimo Vidal | 2 (8) | 0 | 0 | 0 | 0 | 2 | 37th |
| 2000 | 125cc | Circuito Valencia Aspar Aprilia | Aprilia RS125R | 21 | (France) Arnaud Vincent | 16 | 1 | 2 | 0 | 1 | 132 | 7th |
| 2000 | 125cc | Circuito Valencia Aspar Aprilia | Aprilia RS125R | 44 | (Spain) Héctor Faubel | 2 | 0 | 0 | 0 | 0 | 0 | NC |
| 2001 | 250cc | Valência Circuit - Aspar Team | Aprilia RSV 250 | 6 | (Spain) Alex Debón | 16 | 0 | 0 | 0 | 0 | 60 | 11th |
| 2001 | 250cc | Valência Circuit - Aspar Team | Aprilia RSV 250 | 10 | (Spain) Fonsi Nieto | 15 | 0 | 2 | 2 | 0 | 167 | 5th |
| 2001 | 125cc | Valência Circuit - Aspar Team | Aprilia RS125R | 31 | (Spain) Ángel Rodríguez | 15 | 0 | 0 | 0 | 0 | 27 | 20th |
| 2001 | 125cc | Valência Circuit - Aspar Team | Aprilia RS125R | 44 | (Spain) Héctor Faubel | 2 | 0 | 0 | 0 | 0 | 0 | NC |
| 2002 | 125cc | Master – Aspar Team | Aprilia RS125R | 22 | (Spain) Pablo Nieto | 16 | 0 | 3 | 1 | 0 | 145 | 6th |
| 2002 | 125cc | Master – Aspar Team | Aprilia RS125R | 47 | (Spain) Ángel Rodríguez | 9 | 0 | 0 | 0 | 0 | 17 | 24th |
| 2002 | 125cc | Master – Aspar Team | Aprilia RS125R | 80 | (Spain) Héctor Barberá | 15 | 0 | 0 | 0 | 0 | 50 | 14th |
| 2003 | 250cc | Aspar Junior Team | Aprilia RSV 250 | 11 | (Spain) Joan Olivé | 16 | 0 | 0 | 0 | 0 | 38 | 12th |
| 2003 | 250cc | Aspar Junior Team | Aprilia RSV 250 | 33 | (Spain) Héctor Faubel | 16 | 0 | 0 | 0 | 0 | 34 | 13th |
| 2003 | 125cc | Master - Mx Onda - Aspar | Aprilia RS125R | 22 | (Spain) Pablo Nieto | 16 | 1 | 3 | 2 | 1 | 148 | 7th |
| 2003 | 125cc | Master - Mx Onda - Aspar | Aprilia RS125R | 80 | (Spain) Héctor Barberá | 16 | 2 | 5 | 0 | 2 | 164 | 3rd |
| 2004 | 250cc | Repsol – Aspar Team 250cc | Aprilia RSV 250 | 10 | (Spain) Fonsi Nieto | 16 | 0 | 1 | 0 | 0 | 124 | 7th |
| 2004 | 250cc | Repsol – Aspar Team 250cc | Aprilia RSV 250 | 19 | (Argentina) Sebastián Porto | 16 | 5 | 10 | 7 | 5 | 256 | 2nd |
| 2004 | 250cc | Grefusa – Aspar Team 250cc | Aprilia RSV 250 | 28 | (Germany) Dirk Heidolf | 15 | 0 | 0 | 0 | 0 | 13 | 23rd |
| 2004 | 250cc | Grefusa – Aspar Team 250cc | Aprilia RSV 250 | 33 | (Spain) Héctor Faubel | 14 | 0 | 0 | 0 | 0 | 31 | 17th |
| 2004 | 250cc | Grefusa – Aspar Team 250cc | Aprilia RSV 250 | 22 | (Spain) Iván Silva | 1 | 0 | 0 | 0 | 0 | 0 | NC |
| 2004 | 125cc | Master – Repsol Team 125cc | Aprilia RS 125 R | 22 | (Spain) Pablo Nieto | 16 | 0 | 2 | 0 | 2 | 138 | 6th |
| 2004 | 125cc | Master – Repsol Team 125cc | Aprilia RS 125 R | 33 | (Spain) Sergio Gadea | 16 | 0 | 0 | 0 | 0 | 29 | 19th |
| 2005 | 250cc | Aprilia Aspar 250cc | Aprilia RSV 250 | 7 | (France) Randy de Puniet | 16 | 1 | 3 | 1 | 2 | 138 | 8th |
| 2005 | 250cc | Aprilia Aspar 250cc | Aprilia RSV 250 | 19 | (Argentina) Sebastián Porto | 15 | 1 | 4 | 0 | 2 | 152 | 6th |
| 2005 | 125cc | Master Aspar | Aprilia RS125R | 33 | (Spain) Sergio Gadea | 16 | 0 | 1 | 1 | 2 | 68 | 12th |
| 2005 | 125cc | Master Aspar | Aprilia RS125R | 55 | (Spain) Héctor Faubel | 16 | 0 | 3 | 0 | 3 | 113 | 9th |
| 2005 | 125cc | MVA Aspar | Aprilia RS125R | 28 | (Spain) Jordi Carchano | 16 | 0 | 0 | 0 | 0 | 6 | 29th |
| 2005 | 125cc | MVA Aspar | Aprilia RS125R | 84 | (Spain) Julián Miralles | 6 | 0 | 0 | 0 | 0 | 0 | NC |
| 2005 | 125cc | Aspar Team; MVA Aspar | Aprilia RS125R | 86 | (Spain) Mateo Túnez | 2 | 0 | 0 | 0 | 0 (1) | 0 | NC |
| 2005 | 125cc | Aspar Team; MVA Aspar | Aprilia RS125R | 46 | (Spain) Mateo Túnez | 9 | 0 | 0 | 0 | 1 | 0 | NC |
| 2006 | 250cc | Master - MVA Aspar Team | Aprilia RSW 250 | 7 | (San Marino) Alex de Angelis | 16 | 1 | 11 | 0 | 5 | 228 | 3rd |
| 2006 | 125cc | Master - MVA Aspar | Aprilia RS 125 R | 19 | (Spain) Álvaro Bautista | 16 | 8 | 14 | 8 | 7 | 338 | 1st |
| 2006 | 125cc | Master - MVA Aspar | Aprilia RS 125 R | 21 | (Spain) Mateo Túnez | 12 | 0 | 0 | 0 | 0 | 0 | NC |
| 2006 | 125cc | Master - MVA Aspar | Aprilia RS 125 R | 33 | (Spain) Sergio Gadea | 15 | 0 | 5 | 0 | 2 | 160 | 5th |
| 2006 | 125cc | Master - MVA Aspar | Aprilia RS 125 R | 55 | (Spain) Héctor Faubel | 16 | 2 | 5 | 0 | 2 | 197 | 3rd |
| 2006 | 125cc | Master - MVA Aspar | Aprilia RS 125 R | 75 | (Italy) Mattia Pasini | 16 | 2 | 6 | 2 | 2 | 192 | 4th |
| 2007 | 250cc | Master MVA Aspar Team | Aprilia RSA 250 | 3 | (San Marino) Alex de Angelis | 17 | 0 | 8 | 1 | 5 | 235 | 3rd |
| 2007 | 250cc | Master MVA Aspar Team | Aprilia RSA 250 | 19 | (Spain) Álvaro Bautista | 17 | 2 | 7 | 1 | 1 | 181 | 4th |
| 2007 | 125cc | Bancaja Aspar | Aprilia RS 125 R | 14 | (Hungary) Gábor Talmácsi | 17 | 3 | 10 | 5 | 6 | 282 | 1st |
| 2007 | 125cc | Bancaja Aspar | Aprilia RSA 125 | 33 | (Spain) Sergio Gadea | 17 | 1 | 3 | 0 | 1 | 160 | 7th |
| 2007 | 125cc | Bancaja Aspar | Aprilia RSA 125 | 55 | (Spain) Héctor Faubel | 17 | 5 | 13 | 2 | 2 | 277 | 2nd |
| 2008 | 250cc | Mapfre Aspar Team | Aprilia RSA 250 | 19 | (Spain) Álvaro Bautista | 16 | 4 | 11 | 5 | 7 | 244 | 2nd |
| 2008 | 250cc | Mapfre Aspar Team | Aprilia RSA 250 | 55 | (Spain) Héctor Faubel | 16 | 0 | 0 | 0 | 0 | 64 | 14th |
| 2008 | 125cc | Bancaja Aspar Team | Aprilia RSA 125 | 1 | (Hungary) Gábor Talmácsi | 17 | 3 | 9 | 4 | 2 | 206 | 3rd |
| 2008 | 125cc | Bancaja Aspar Team | Aprilia RSA 125 | 33 | (Spain) Sergio Gadea | 17 | 1 | 1 | 1 | 0 | 83 | 12th |
| 2008 | 125cc | Bancaja Aspar Team | Aprilia RS 125 R | 30 | (Spain) Pere Tutusaus | 12 | 0 | 0 | 0 | 0 | 9 | 26th |
| 2008 | 125cc | Bancaja Aspar Team | Aprilia RS 125 R | 26 | (Spain) Adrián Martín | 5 | 0 | 0 | 0 | 0 | 1 | 33rd |
| 2008 | 125cc | Bancaja Aspar Team | Aprilia RS 125 R | 54 | (United States) PJ Jacobsen | 1 | 0 | 0 | 0 | 0 | 0 | NC |
| 2009 | 250cc | Mapfre Aspar Team 250cc | Aprilia RSA 250 | 19 | (Spain) Álvaro Bautista | 16 | 2 | 10 | 3 | 4 | 218 | 4th |
| 2009 | 250cc | Mapfre Aspar Team 250cc | Aprilia RSW 250 LE; Aprilia RSA 250 | 63 | (France) Mike Di Meglio | 16 | 0 | 2 | 1 | 0 | 107 | 8th |
| 2009 | 125cc | Bancaja Aspar Team 125cc | Aprilia RSA 125 | 33 | (Spain) Sergio Gadea | 16 | 1 | 5 | 0 | 1 | 141 | 5th |
| 2009 | 125cc | Bancaja Aspar Team 125cc | Aprilia RSA 125 | 38 | (United Kingdom) Bradley Smith | 16 | 2 | 9 | 3 | 3 | 223.5 | 2nd |
| 2009 | 125cc | Bancaja Aspar Team 125cc | Aprilia RSA 125 | 60 | (Spain) Julián Simón | 16 | 7 | 12 | 7 | 7 | 289 | 1st |
| 2010 | MotoGP | Páginas Amarillas Aspar | Ducati Desmosedici GP10 | 40 | (Spain) Héctor Barberá | 18 | 0 | 0 | 0 | 0 | 90 | 12th |
| 2010 | Moto2 | Mapfre Aspar Team | RSV Motor DR600; Suter MMX | 60 | (Spain) Julián Simón | 17 | 0 | 8 | 3 | 3 | 201 | 2nd |
| 2010 | Moto2 | Mapfre Aspar Team | RSV Motor DR600; Suter MMX | 63 | (France) Mike Di Meglio | 16 | 0 | 0 | 0 | 0 | 34 | 20th |
| 2010 | 125cc | Bancaja Aspar Team | Aprilia RSA 125 | 38 | (United Kingdom) Bradley Smith | 17 | 1 | 6 | 3 | 1 | 223 | 4th |
| 2010 | 125cc | Bancaja Aspar Team | Aprilia RSA 125 | 40 | (Spain) Nicolás Terol | 16 | 3 | 14 | 1 | 2 | 296 | 2nd |
| 2011 | MotoGP | Mapfre Aspar Team MotoGP | Ducati Desmosedici GP11 | 8 | (Spain) Héctor Barberá | 16 | 0 | 0 | 0 | 0 | 82 | 11th |
| 2011 | Moto2 | Mapfre Aspar Team Moto2 | Suter MMXI | 21 | (Spain) Javier Forés | 7 | 0 | 0 | 0 | 0 | 0 | NC |
| 2011 | Moto2 | Mapfre Aspar Team Moto2 | Suter MMXI | 60 | (Spain) Julián Simón | 10 | 0 | 1 | 0 | 0 | 68 | 14th |
| 2011 | Moto2 | Mapfre Aspar Team Moto2 | Suter MMXI | 18 | (Spain) Jordi Torres | 10 | 0 | 0 | 0 | 0 | 0 | NC |
| 2011 | Moto2 | Mapfre Aspar Team Moto2 | Suter MMXI | 35 | (Italy) Raffaele De Rosa | 1 (13) | 0 | 0 | 0 | 0 | 0 | NC |
| 2011 | Moto2 | Mapfre Aspar Team Moto2 | Suter MMXI | 82 | (Spain) Elena Rosell | 2 | 0 | 0 | 0 | 0 | 0 | NC |
| 2011 | Moto2 | Mapfre Aspar Team Moto2 | Suter MMXI | 20 | (Spain) Iván Moreno | 2 | 0 | 0 | 0 | 0 | 0 | NC |
| 2011 | 125cc | Bankia Aspar Team | Aprilia RSA 125 | 18 | (Spain) Nicolás Terol | 16 | 8 | 11 | 7 | 5 | 302 | 1st |
| 2011 | 125cc | Bankia Aspar Team | Aprilia RSA 125 | 26 | (Spain) Adrián Martín | 17 | 0 | 0 | 0 | 0 | 45 | 13th |
| 2011 | 125cc | Bankia Aspar Team | Aprilia RSA 125 | 55 | (Spain) Héctor Faubel | 17 | 1 | 4 | 1 | 2 | 177 | 5th |
| 2012 | MotoGP | Power Electronics Aspar | Aprilia-ART GP12 | 14 | (France) Randy de Puniet | 18 | 0 | 0 | 0 | 0 | 62 | 13th |
| 2012 | MotoGP | Power Electronics Aspar | Aprilia-ART GP12 | 41 | (Spain) Aleix Espargaró | 18 | 0 | 0 | 0 | 0 | 74 | 12th |
| 2012 | Moto2 | Mapfre Aspar Team Moto2 | Suter MMX2 | 18 | (Spain) Nicolás Terol | 17 | 0 | 1 | 0 | 0 | 37 | 17th |
| 2012 | Moto2 | Mapfre Aspar Team Moto2 | Suter MMX2 | 24 | (Spain) Toni Elías | 9 (13) | 0 | 0 | 0 | 0 | 35 (50) | 16th |
| 2012 | Moto2 | Mapfre Aspar Team Moto2 | Suter MMX2 | 81 | (Spain) Jordi Torres | 8 (9) | 0 | 0 | 0 | 0 | 31 | 19th |
| 2012 | Moto3 | Bankia Aspar Team; Mapfre Aspar Team Moto3 | Kalex-KTM | 23 | (Spain) Alberto Moncayo | 9 (16) | 0 | 1 | 0 | 0 | 36 (52) | 17th |
| 2012 | Moto3 | Bankia Aspar Team; Mapfre Aspar Team Moto3 | Kalex-KTM | 55 | (Spain) Héctor Faubel | 11 (12) | 0 | 0 | 0 | 0 | 52 (63) | 16th |
| 2012 | Moto3 | Bankia Aspar Team; Mapfre Aspar Team Moto3 | Kalex-KTM | 94 | (Germany) Jonas Folger | 8 (15) | 1 | 4 | 2 | 0 | 88 (93) | 9th |
| 2012 | Moto3 | Bankia Aspar Team; Mapfre Aspar Team Moto3 | Kalex-KTM | 29 | (Germany) Luca Amato | 5 | 0 | 0 | 0 | 0 | 0 | NC |
| 2013 | MotoGP | Power Electronics Aspar | Aprilia-ART GP13 | 14 | (France) Randy de Puniet | 18 | 0 | 0 | 0 | 0 | 36 | 15th |
| 2013 | MotoGP | Power Electronics Aspar | Aprilia-ART GP13 | 41 | (Spain) Aleix Espargaró | 18 | 0 | 0 | 0 | 0 | 93 | 11th |
| 2013 | Moto2 | Mapfre Aspar Team Moto2; Aspar Team Moto2 | Suter MMX2 | 18 | (Spain) Nicolás Terol | 17 | 3 | 4 | 1 | 1 | 150 | 7th |
| 2013 | Moto2 | Mapfre Aspar Team Moto2; Aspar Team Moto2 | Suter MMX2 | 81 | (Spain) Jordi Torres | 17 | 1 | 3 | 0 | 1 | 128 | 10th |
| 2013 | Moto3 | Mapfre Aspar Team Moto3 | Kalex-KTM | 57 | (Brazil) Eric Granado | 17 | 0 | 0 | 0 | 0 | 7 | 25th |
| 2013 | Moto3 | Mapfre Aspar Team Moto3 | Kalex-KTM | 94 | (Germany) Jonas Folger | 16 | 0 | 4 | 2 | 1 | 183 | 5th |
| 2014 | MotoGP | Drive M7 Aspar | Honda RC213V-RS; Honda RCV1000R | 7 | (Japan) Hiroshi Aoyama | 18 | 0 | 0 | 0 | 0 | 68 | 14th |
| 2014 | MotoGP | Drive M7 Aspar | Honda RCV1000R | 69 | (United States) Nicky Hayden | 13 | 0 | 0 | 0 | 0 | 47 | 16th |
| 2014 | MotoGP | Drive M7 Aspar | Honda RCV1000R | 2 | (United Kingdom) Leon Camier | 4 | 0 | 0 | 0 | 0 | 1 | 27th |
| 2014 | Moto2 | Mapfre Aspar Team Moto2 | Suter MMX2 | 18 | (Spain) Nicolás Terol | 16 | 0 | 0 | 0 | 0 | 2 | 28th |
| 2014 | Moto2 | Mapfre Aspar Team Moto2 | Suter MMX2 | 81 | (Spain) Jordi Torres | 18 | 0 | 0 | 0 | 0 | 57 | 16th |
| 2014 | Moto2 | Mapfre Aspar Team Moto2 | Suter MMX2 | 80 | (Belgium) Dakota Mamola | 1 | 0 | 0 | 0 | 0 | 0 | NC |
| 2014 | Moto3 | Mapfre Aspar Team Moto3 | Kalex-KTM | 58 | (Spain) Juan Francisco Guevara | 18 | 0 | 0 | 0 | 0 | 46 | 17th |
| 2015 | MotoGP | Aspar MotoGP Team | Honda RC213V-RS | 50 | (Republic of Ireland) Eugene Laverty | 18 | 0 | 0 | 0 | 0 | 9 | 22nd |
| 2015 | MotoGP | Aspar MotoGP Team | Honda RC213V-RS | 69 | (United States) Nicky Hayden | 18 | 0 | 0 | 0 | 0 | 16 | 20th |
| 2015 | Moto3 | Mapfre Team Mahindra | Mahindra MGP3O | 21 | (Italy) Francesco Bagnaia | 18 | 0 | 1 | 0 | 0 | 76 | 14th |
| 2015 | Moto3 | Mapfre Team Mahindra | Mahindra MGP3O | 58 | (Spain) Juan Francisco Guevara | 17 | 0 | 0 | 0 | 0 | 15 | 24th |
| 2015 | Moto3 | Mapfre Team Mahindra | Mahindra MGP3O | 88 | (Spain) Jorge Martín | 18 | 0 | 0 | 0 | 0 | 45 | 17th |
| 2016 | MotoGP | Aspar Team MotoGP; Pull & Bear Aspar Team | Ducati Desmosedici GP14 | 50 | (Republic of Ireland) Eugene Laverty | 18 | 0 | 0 | 0 | 0 | 77 | 13th |
| 2016 | MotoGP | Aspar Team MotoGP; Pull & Bear Aspar Team | Ducati Desmosedici GP14 | 68 | (Colombia) Yonny Hernández | 18 | 0 | 0 | 0 | 0 | 20 | 22nd |
| 2016 | Moto3 | Aspar Mahindra Team Moto3; Pull & Bear Aspar Mahindra Team | Mahindra MGP3O | 21 | (Italy) Francesco Bagnaia | 18 | 2 | 6 | 1 | 0 | 145 | 4th |
| 2016 | Moto3 | Aspar Mahindra Team Moto3; Pull & Bear Aspar Mahindra Team | Mahindra MGP3O | 88 | (Spain) Jorge Martín | 16 | 0 | 1 | 0 | 0 | 72 | 16th |
| 2016 | Moto3 | MRW Mahindra Aspar Team; Aspar Mahindra Team Moto3 | Mahindra MGP3O | 12 | (Spain) Albert Arenas | 2 (12) | 0 | 0 | 0 | 0 | 0 (2) | 35th |
| 2016 | Moto3 | MRW Mahindra Aspar Team; Aspar Mahindra Team Moto3 | Mahindra MGP3O | 12 | (Spain) Albert Arenas | 1 (12) | 0 | 0 | 0 | 0 | 0 (2) | 35th |
| 2017 | MotoGP | Pull&Bear Aspar Team | Ducati Desmosedici GP16 | 19 | (Spain) Álvaro Bautista | 18 | 0 | 0 | 0 | 0 | 75 | 12th |
| 2017 | MotoGP | Pull&Bear Aspar Team | Ducati Desmosedici GP15 | 17 | (Czech Republic) Karel Abraham | 18 | 0 | 0 | 0 | 0 | 32 | 20th |
| 2017 | Moto3 | Mahindra Motard Aspar; Aspar Mahindra Moto3; Mahindra MRW Aspar Team | Mahindra MGP3O | 48 | (Italy) Lorenzo Dalla Porta | 18 | 0 | 0 | 0 | 0 | 9 | 28th |
| 2017 | Moto3 | Mahindra Motard Aspar; Aspar Mahindra Moto3; Mahindra MRW Aspar Team | Mahindra MGP3O | 75 | (Spain) Albert Arenas | 12 | 0 | 0 | 0 | 0 | 14 | 26th |
| 2017 | Moto3 | Mahindra Motard Aspar; Aspar Mahindra Moto3; Mahindra MRW Aspar Team | Mahindra MGP3O | 31 | (Spain) Raúl Fernández | 1 | 0 | 0 | 0 | 0 | 0 | 40th |
| 2017 | Moto3 | Mahindra Motard Aspar; Aspar Mahindra Moto3; Mahindra MRW Aspar Team | Mahindra MGP3O | 31 | (Spain) Raúl Fernández | 2 | 0 | 0 | 0 | 0 | 0 | 40th |
| 2017 | Moto3 | Mahindra Motard Aspar; Aspar Mahindra Moto3; Mahindra MRW Aspar Team | Mahindra MGP3O | 6 | (Spain) María Herrera | 2 (15) | 0 | 0 | 0 | 0 | 0 (1) | 35th |
| 2018 | MotoGP | Ángel Nieto Team | Ducati Desmosedici GP17 | 19 | (Spain) Álvaro Bautista | 17 (18) | 0 | 0 | 0 | 0 | 92 (105) | 12th |
| 2018 | MotoGP | Ángel Nieto Team | Ducati Desmosedici GP17; Ducati Desmosedici GP16 | 17 | (Czech Republic) Karel Abraham | 18 | 0 | 0 | 0 | 0 | 12 | 23rd |
| 2018 | MotoGP | Ángel Nieto Team | Ducati Desmosedici GP16 | 7 | (Australia) Mike Jones | 1 | 0 | 0 | 0 | 0 | 0 | 30th |
| 2018 | Moto3 | Ángel Nieto Team Moto3 | KTM RC250GP | 16 | (Italy) Andrea Migno | 18 | 0 | 1 | 0 | 0 | 84 | 11th |
| 2018 | Moto3 | Ángel Nieto Team Moto3 | KTM RC250GP | 75 | (Spain) Albert Arenas | 17 | 2 | 2 | 0 | 0 | 107 | 9th |
| 2018 | Moto3 | Ángel Nieto Team Moto3 | KTM RC250GP | 25 | (Spain) Raúl Fernández | 3 (4) | 0 | 0 | 0 | 0 | 9 (16) | 28th |
| 2019 | Moto2 | Gaviota Ángel Nieto Team; Sama Qatar Ángel Nieto Team; Inde Ángel Nieto Team | KTM Moto2 | 18 | (Andorra) Xavier Cardelús | 19 | 0 | 0 | 0 | 0 | 0 | 35th |
| 2019 | Moto2 | Gaviota Ángel Nieto Team; Sama Qatar Ángel Nieto Team; Inde Ángel Nieto Team | KTM Moto2 | 96 | (United Kingdom) Jake Dixon | 17 | 0 | 0 | 0 | 0 | 7 | 25th |
| 2019 | Moto2 | Gaviota Ángel Nieto Team; Sama Qatar Ángel Nieto Team; Inde Ángel Nieto Team | KTM Moto2 | 54 | (Italy) Mattia Pasini | 1 (12) | 0 | 0 | 0 | 0 | 0 (35) | 20th |
| 2019 | Moto3 | Gaviota Ángel Nieto Team; Sama Qatar Ángel Nieto Team; Valresa Ángel Nieto Team | KTM RC250GP | 25 | (Spain) Raúl Fernández | 19 | 0 | 0 | 0 | 0 | 60 | 21st |
| 2019 | Moto3 | Gaviota Ángel Nieto Team; Sama Qatar Ángel Nieto Team; Valresa Ángel Nieto Team | KTM RC250GP | 75 | (Spain) Albert Arenas | 17 | 1 | 3 | 0 | 0 | 108 | 11th |
| 2019 | Moto3 | Gaviota Ángel Nieto Team; Sama Qatar Ángel Nieto Team; Valresa Ángel Nieto Team | KTM RC250GP | 81 | (Spain) Aleix Viu | 2 | 0 | 0 | 0 | 0 | 0 | 42nd |
| 2019 | Moto3 | Gaviota Ángel Nieto Team; Sama Qatar Ángel Nieto Team; Valresa Ángel Nieto Team | KTM RC250GP | 73 | (Austria) Maximilian Kofler | 2 | 0 | 0 | 0 | 0 | 0 | 43rd |
| 2019 | MotoE | Openbank Ángel Nieto Team | Energica Ego Corsa | 6 | (Spain) María Herrera | 6 | 0 | 0 | 0 | 0 | 27 | 14th |
| 2019 | MotoE | Openbank Ángel Nieto Team | Energica Ego Corsa | 18 | (Spain) Nicolás Terol | 6 | 0 | 0 | 0 | 0 | 33 | 12th |
| 2020 | Moto2 | Aspar TeamInde Aspar Team Moto2; Openbank Aspar Team Moto2; Oceanica Aspar Team Moto2; Kipin Energy Aspar Team Moto2; Pull&Bear Aspar Team Moto2 | Speed Up SF20T | 44 | (Spain) Arón Canet | 12 | 0 | 0 | 0 | 0 | 67 | 14th |
| 2020 | Moto2 | Aspar TeamInde Aspar Team Moto2; Openbank Aspar Team Moto2; Oceanica Aspar Team Moto2; Kipin Energy Aspar Team Moto2; Pull&Bear Aspar Team Moto2 | Speed Up SF20T | 55 | (Malaysia) Hafizh Syahrin | 14 | 0 | 0 | 0 | 0 | 21 | 21st |
| 2020 | Moto2 | Aspar TeamInde Aspar Team Moto2; Openbank Aspar Team Moto2; Oceanica Aspar Team Moto2; Kipin Energy Aspar Team Moto2; Pull&Bear Aspar Team Moto2 | Speed Up SF20T | 5 | (Spain) Alejandro Medina | 1 | 0 | 0 | 0 | 0 | 0 | 35th |
| 2020 | Moto2 | Aspar TeamInde Aspar Team Moto2; Openbank Aspar Team Moto2; Oceanica Aspar Team Moto2; Kipin Energy Aspar Team Moto2; Pull&Bear Aspar Team Moto2 | Speed Up SF20T | 18 | (Andorra) Xavier Cardelús | 2 | 0 | 0 | 0 | 0 | 0 | 34th |
| 2020 | Moto3 | Aspar Team Gaviota; Gaviota Aspar Team Moto3; Solunion Aspar Team Moto3; Valresa Aspar Team; Pull&Bear Aspar Team Moto3 | KTM RC250GP | 75 | (Spain) Albert Arenas | 15 | 3 | 5 | 0 | 1 | 174 | 1st |
| 2020 | Moto3 | Aspar Team Gaviota; Gaviota Aspar Team Moto3; Solunion Aspar Team Moto3; Valresa Aspar Team; Pull&Bear Aspar Team Moto3 | KTM RC250GP | 82 | (Italy) Stefano Nepa | 15 | 0 | 0 | 0 | 0 | 38 | 20th |
| 2020 | MotoE | Openbank Aspar Team | Energica Ego Corsa | 6 | (Spain) María Herrera | 7 | 0 | 0 | 0 | 0 | 33 | 17th |
| 2020 | MotoE | Openbank Aspar Team | Energica Ego Corsa | 55 | (Spain) Alejandro Medina | 7 | 0 | 0 | 0 | 0 | 36 | 13th |
| 2021 | Moto2 | Inde Aspar Team; Solunion Aspar Team; Kipin Energy Aspar Team; Aspar Team Moto2; QuieroCorredor Aspar Team | Boscoscuro B-21 | 44 | (Spain) Arón Canet | 18 | 0 | 5 | 0 | 0 | 164 | 6th |
| 2021 | Moto2 | Inde Aspar Team; Solunion Aspar Team; Kipin Energy Aspar Team; Aspar Team Moto2; QuieroCorredor Aspar Team | Boscoscuro B-21 | 75 | (Spain) Albert Arenas | 18 | 0 | 0 | 0 | 0 | 28 | 21st |
| 2021 | Moto3 | GasGas Gaviota Aspar; GasGas Valresa Aspar Team; Solunion GasGas Aspar Team; Gaviota GasGas Aspar Team; Santander Consumer GasGas; Valresa GasGas Aspar Team; MuchoNeumatico GasGas Aspar Team | GasGas RC250GP | 11 | (Spain) Sergio García | 16 | 3 | 6 | 1 | 1 | 188 | 3rd |
| 2021 | Moto3 | GasGas Gaviota Aspar; GasGas Valresa Aspar Team; Solunion GasGas Aspar Team; Gaviota GasGas Aspar Team; Santander Consumer GasGas; Valresa GasGas Aspar Team; MuchoNeumatico GasGas Aspar Team | GasGas RC250GP | 28 | (Spain) Izan Guevara | 18 | 1 | 1 | 0 | 4 | 125 | 8th |
| 2021 | Moto3 | GasGas Gaviota Aspar; GasGas Valresa Aspar Team; Solunion GasGas Aspar Team; Gaviota GasGas Aspar Team; Santander Consumer GasGas; Valresa GasGas Aspar Team; MuchoNeumatico GasGas Aspar Team | GasGas RC250GP | 80 | (Colombia) David Alonso | 1 | 0 | 0 | 0 | 0 | 0 | 38th |
| 2021 | MotoE | OpenBank Aspar Team | Energica Ego Corsa | 6 | (Spain) María Herrera | 7 | 0 | 0 | 0 | 0 | 27 | 15th |
| 2021 | MotoE | OpenBank Aspar Team | Energica Ego Corsa | 54 | (Spain) Fermín Aldeguer | 7 | 0 | 0 | 1 | 0 | 51 | 9th |
| 2022 | Moto2 | GasGas Aspar Team | Kalex Moto2 | 75 | (Spain) Albert Arenas | 20 | 0 | 0 | 0 | 0 | 90 | 12th |
| 2022 | Moto2 | GasGas Aspar Team | Kalex Moto2 | 96 | (United Kingdom) Jake Dixon | 20 | 0 | 6 | 2 | 0 | 168.5 | 6th |
| 2022 | Moto2 | GasGas Aspar Team | Kalex Moto2 | 11 | (Italy) Mattia Pasini | 2 (3) | 0 | 0 | 0 | 0 | 1 | 33rd |
| 2022 | Moto3 | GasGas Aspar Team | GasGas RC250GP | 11 | (Spain) Sergio García | 19 | 3 | 10 | 1 | 0 | 257 | 2nd |
| 2022 | Moto3 | GasGas Aspar Team | GasGas RC250GP | 28 | (Spain) Izan Guevara | 20 | 7 | 12 | 5 | 2 | 319 | 1st |
| 2022 | Moto3 | GasGas Aspar Team | GasGas RC250GP | 80 | (Colombia) David Alonso | 1 | 0 | 0 | 0 | 0 | 0 | 44th |
| 2022 | Moto3 | GasGas Aspar Team | GasGas RC250GP | 77 | (Italy) Filippo Farioli | 1 | 0 | 0 | 0 | 0 | 0 | 33rd |
| 2022 | MotoE | OpenBank Aspar Team | Energica Ego Corsa | 6 | (Spain) María Herrera | 12 | 0 | 0 | 0 | 0 | 21 | 17th |
| 2022 | MotoE | OpenBank Aspar Team | Energica Ego Corsa | 70 | (Spain) Marc Alcoba | 12 | 0 | 0 | 0 | 0 | 46.5 | 13th |
| 2023 | Moto2 | GasGas Aspar Team | Kalex Moto2 | 28 | (Spain) Izan Guevara | 18 | 0 | 0 | 0 | 0 | 20 | 22nd |
| 2023 | Moto2 | GasGas Aspar Team | Kalex Moto2 | 96 | (United Kingdom) Jake Dixon | 19 | 2 | 5 | 2 | 1 | 204 | 4th |
| 2023 | Moto2 | GasGas Aspar Team | Kalex Moto2 | 81 | (Spain) Jordi Torres | 2 | 0 | 0 | 0 | 0 | 0 | 32nd |
| 2023 | Moto3 | GasGas Aspar Team | GasGas RC250GP | 6 | (Japan) Ryusei Yamanaka | 20 | 0 | 0 | 0 | 1 | 84 | 13th |
| 2023 | Moto3 | GasGas Aspar Team | GasGas RC250GP | 80 | (Colombia) David Alonso | 20 | 4 | 8 | 0 | 3 | 245 | 3rd |
| 2023 | MotoE | Openbank Aspar Team | Ducati V21L | 6 | (Spain) María Herrera | 16 | 0 | 0 | 0 | 0 | 17 | 18th |
| 2023 | MotoE | Openbank Aspar Team | Ducati V21L | 81 | (Spain) Jordi Torres | 16 | 2 | 6 | 4 | 3 | 217 | 2nd |
| 2024 | Moto2 | CFMoto Aspar Team; CFMoto Inde Aspar Team; CFMoto Asterius Aspar Team; CFMoto Polarcube Aspar Team; CFMoto RCB Aspar Team | Kalex Moto2 | 28 | (Spain) Izan Guevara | 19 | 0 | 1 | 0 | 0 | 69 | 17th |
| 2024 | Moto2 | CFMoto Aspar Team; CFMoto Inde Aspar Team; CFMoto Asterius Aspar Team; CFMoto Polarcube Aspar Team; CFMoto RCB Aspar Team | Kalex Moto2 | 96 | (United Kingdom) Jake Dixon | 18 | 2 | 5 | 2 | 1 | 155 | 8th |
| 2024 | Moto3 | CFMoto Aspar Racing Team; CFMoto Gaviota Aspar Team; CFMoto Valresa Aspar Team | CFMoto Moto3 | 78 | (Spain) Joel Esteban | 19 | 0 | 0 | 0 | 1 | 45 | 17th |
| 2024 | Moto3 | CFMoto Aspar Racing Team; CFMoto Gaviota Aspar Team; CFMoto Valresa Aspar Team | CFMoto Moto3 | 80 | (Colombia) David Alonso | 20 | 14 | 15 | 6 | 3 | 421 | 1st |
| 2024 | Moto3 | CFMoto Aspar Racing Team; CFMoto Gaviota Aspar Team; CFMoto Valresa Aspar Team | CFMoto Moto3 | 89 | (Spain) Marcos Uriarte | 1 | 0 | 0 | 0 | 0 | 0 | 35th |
| 2024 | MotoE | Openbank Aspar Team | Ducati V21L | 21 | (Italy) Kevin Zannoni | 16 | 2 | 5 | 0 | 1 | 191 | 4th |
| 2024 | MotoE | Openbank Aspar Team | Ducati V21L | 81 | (Spain) Jordi Torres | 16 | 0 | 2 | 0 | 0 | 152 | 6th |
| 2025 | Moto2 | CFMoto Aspar Team; CFMoto Inde Aspar Team; CFMoto Power Electronics Aspar Team; CFMoto Gaviota Aspar Team; CFMoto European Privilege Aspar Team; CFMoto Impulse Aspar Team | Kalex Moto2 | 27 | (Spain) Daniel Holgado | 22 | 2 | 4 | 4 | 2 | 208 | 6th |
| 2025 | Moto2 | CFMoto Aspar Team; CFMoto Inde Aspar Team; CFMoto Power Electronics Aspar Team; CFMoto Gaviota Aspar Team; CFMoto European Privilege Aspar Team; CFMoto Impulse Aspar Team | Kalex Moto2 | 80 | (Colombia) David Alonso | 22 | 1 | 5 | 0 | 2 | 153 | 9th |
| 2025 | Moto3 | CFMoto Aspar Team; CFMoto Gaviota Aspar Team; CFMoto Valresa Aspar Team; CFMoto Viel Aspar Team | CFMoto Moto3 | 28 | (Spain) Máximo Quiles | 18 | 3 | 9 | 2 | 0 | 274 | 3rd |
| 2025 | Moto3 | CFMoto Aspar Team; CFMoto Gaviota Aspar Team; CFMoto Valresa Aspar Team; CFMoto Viel Aspar Team | CFMoto Moto3 | 71 | (Italy) Dennis Foggia | 20 | 0 | 1 | 0 | 0 | 96 | 14th |
| 2025 | Moto3 | CFMoto Aspar Team; CFMoto Gaviota Aspar Team; CFMoto Valresa Aspar Team; CFMoto Viel Aspar Team | CFMoto Moto3 | 34 | (Austria) Jakob Rosenthaler | 2 (5) | 0 | 0 | 0 | 0 | 0 | 35th |
| 2025 | Moto3 | CFMoto Aspar Team; CFMoto Gaviota Aspar Team; CFMoto Valresa Aspar Team; CFMoto Viel Aspar Team | CFMoto Moto3 | 78 | (Spain) Joel Esteban | 4 (7) | 0 | 0 | 0 | 0 | 0 (33) | 19th |
| 2025 | MotoE | Power Electronics Aspar Team | Ducati V21L | 21 | (Italy) Kevin Zannoni | 14 | 0 | 1 | 0 | 0 | 122 | 8th |
| 2025 | MotoE | Power Electronics Aspar Team | Ducati V21L | 81 | (Spain) Jordi Torres | 14 | 0 | 2 | 0 | 0 | 104 | 11th |
| 2026 | Moto2 | CFMoto Aspar Team; CFMoto Inde Aspar Team; CFMoto Power Electronics Aspar Team; CFMoto Gaviota Aspar Team; CFMoto Impulse Aspar Team | Kalex Moto2 | 27 | (Spain) Daniel Holgado | 18 | 2 | 7 | 2 | 2 | 215* | 4th* |
| 2026 | Moto2 | CFMoto Aspar Team; CFMoto Inde Aspar Team; CFMoto Power Electronics Aspar Team; CFMoto Gaviota Aspar Team; CFMoto Impulse Aspar Team | Kalex Moto2 | 80 | (Colombia) David Alonso | 18 | 2 | 5 | 2 | 2 | 204* | 5th* |
| 2026 | Moto3 | CFMoto Aspar Team; CFMoto Gaviota Aspar Team; CFMoto Valresa Aspar Team | CFMoto Moto3 | 28 | (Spain) Máximo Quiles | 18 | 11 | 17 | 4 | 3 | 392* | 1st |
| 2026 | Moto3 | CFMoto Aspar Team; CFMoto Gaviota Aspar Team; CFMoto Valresa Aspar Team | CFMoto Moto3 | 95 | (Argentina) Marco Morelli | 19 | 0 | 3 | 0 | 2 | 141* | 7th* |

Key
Regular rider
Replacement rider
Wildcard rider
Replacement/wildcard rider

Notes

* Season still in progress.

== MotoGP results ==
(key) (Races in bold indicate pole position; races in italics indicate fastest lap)

| Year | Team | Motorcycle | Tyres | No. | Riders | 1 | 2 | 3 | 4 | 5 | 6 | 7 | 8 | 9 | 10 | 11 | 12 | 13 | 14 | 15 | 16 | 17 | 18 | 19 | Points | Pos. |
|---|---|---|---|---|---|---|---|---|---|---|---|---|---|---|---|---|---|---|---|---|---|---|---|---|---|---|
| 2010 | Páginas Amarillas Aspar Racing Team | Ducati Desmosedici GP10 | B | | | QAT | ESP | FRA | ITA | GBR | NED | CAT | GER | USA | CZE | IND | SMR | ARA | JPN | MAL | AUS | POR | VAL | | 90 | 9th |
| 2010 | Páginas Amarillas Aspar Racing Team | Ducati Desmosedici GP10 | B | 40 | (Spain) Héctor Barberá | 12 | 13 | 8 | 12 | 11 | 12 | 10 | 9 | Ret | 9 | 10 | 9 | 11 | 13 | 11 | 14 | 10 | 8 | | 90 | 9th |
| 2011 | Mapfre Aspar Team MotoGP | Ducati Desmosedici GP11 | B | | | QAT | ESP | POR | FRA | CAT | GBR | NED | ITA | GER | USA | CZE | IND | SMR | ARA | JPN | AUS | MAL | VAL | | 82 | 7th |
| 2011 | Mapfre Aspar Team MotoGP | Ducati Desmosedici GP11 | B | 8 | (Spain) Héctor Barberá | 12 | 6 | Ret | 9 | 11 | 11 | 12 | 7 | 11 | 9 | 10 | Ret | 9 | 8 | Ret | | C | 11 | | 82 | 7th |
| 2011 | Mapfre Aspar Team MotoGP | Ducati Desmosedici GP11 | B | 6 | (Australia) Damian Cudlin | | | | | | | | | | | | | | | Ret | DNS | | | | 82 | 7th |
| 2012 | Power Electronics Aspar | ART GP12 | B | | | QAT | ESP | POR | FRA | CAT | GBR | NED | GER | ITA | USA | IND | CZE | SMR | ARA | JPN | MAL | AUS | VAL | | 136 | 6th |
| 2012 | Power Electronics Aspar | ART GP12 | B | 14 | (France) Randy de Puniet | 13 | Ret | 13 | Ret | 15 | 12 | 8 | 11 | 12 | 11 | Ret | 8 | 9 | 11 | Ret | Ret | 11 | 12 | | 136 | 6th |
| 2012 | Power Electronics Aspar | ART GP12 | B | 41 | (Spain) Aleix Espargaró | 15 | 12 | 12 | 13 | 13 | 11 | Ret | 13 | 13 | 9 | 10 | 10 | Ret | 10 | 12 | 8 | 10 | 11 | | 136 | 6th |
| 2013 | Power Electronics Aspar | ART GP13 | B | | | QAT | AME | ESP | FRA | ITA | CAT | NED | GER | USA | IND | CZE | GBR | SMR | ARA | MAL | AUS | JPN | VAL | | 129 | 7th |
| 2013 | Power Electronics Aspar | ART GP13 | B | 14 | (France) Randy de Puniet | 12 | 14 | Ret | Ret | 11 | Ret | 12 | 12 | Ret | Ret | 15 | 16 | 17 | 13 | 12 | 10 | 13 | Ret | | 129 | 7th |
| 2013 | Power Electronics Aspar | ART GP13 | B | 41 | (Spain) Aleix Espargaró | 11 | 11 | 9 | 13 | 8 | 8 | 8 | 8 | Ret | 12 | 10 | 10 | 13 | 11 | 9 | 11 | Ret | 11 | | 129 | 7th |
| 2014 | Drive M7 Aspar | Honda RCV1000R | B | | | QAT | AME | ARG | ESP | FRA | ITA | CAT | NED | GER | IND | CZE | GBR | SMR | ARA | JPN | AUS | MAL | VAL | | 116 | 9th |
| 2014 | Drive M7 Aspar | Honda RCV1000R | B | 2 | (United Kingdom) Leon Camier | | | | | | | | | | Ret | 15 | 16 | 16 | | | | | | | 116 | 9th |
| 2014 | Drive M7 Aspar | Honda RCV1000R | B | 69 | (United States) Nicky Hayden | 8 | 11 | 11 | 11 | Ret | DNS | 12 | 17 | 14 | | | | | 9 | 14 | 10 | Ret | 13 | | 116 | 9th |
| 2014 | Drive M7 Aspar | Honda RCV1000R | B | 7 | (Japan) Hiroshi Aoyama | 11 | 12 | 10 | 12 | 14 | 14 | 15 | 16 | 12 | 10 | 13 | 14 | 12 | 8 | 13 | 8 | 11 | | | 116 | 9th |
| 2014 | Drive M7 Aspar | Honda RC213V-S | B | 7 | (Japan) Hiroshi Aoyama | | | | | | | | | | | | | | | | | | 15 | | 116 | 9th |
| 2015 | Aspar MotoGP Team | Honda RC213V-S | B | | | QAT | AME | ARG | ESP | FRA | ITA | CAT | NED | GER | IND | CZE | GBR | SMR | ARA | JPN | AUS | MAL | VAL | | 25 | 12th |
| 2015 | Aspar MotoGP Team | Honda RC213V-S | B | 50 | (Republic of Ireland) Eugene Laverty | 18 | 16 | 17 | 18 | 14 | 15 | 12 | Ret | 17 | 19 | Ret | 17 | 19 | 14 | 17 | 19 | 19 | Ret | | 25 | 12th |
| 2015 | Aspar MotoGP Team | Honda RC213V-S | B | 69 | (United States) Nicky Hayden | 17 | 13 | 16 | 17 | 11 | Ret | Ret | 16 | 16 | 16 | 17 | 12 | 17 | 15 | 13 | Ret | 16 | 17 | | 25 | 12th |
| 2016 | Aspar Team MotoGP (Rd. 1 - 8); Pull & Bear Aspar Team (Rd. 9 - 18) | Ducati Desmosedici GP14 | M | | | QAT | ARG | AME | ESP | FRA | ITA | CAT | NED | GER | AUT | CZE | GBR | SMR | ARA | JPN | AUS | MAL | VAL | | 97 | 10th |
| 2016 | Aspar Team MotoGP (Rd. 1 - 8); Pull & Bear Aspar Team (Rd. 9 - 18) | Ducati Desmosedici GP14 | M | 50 | (Republic of Ireland) Eugene Laverty | 12 | 4 | 12 | 9 | 11 | 13 | 13 | 7 | 11 | 18 | 6 | 12 | 14 | 14 | Ret | 14 | 12 | 16 | | 97 | 10th |
| 2016 | Aspar Team MotoGP (Rd. 1 - 8); Pull & Bear Aspar Team (Rd. 9 - 18) | Ducati Desmosedici GP14 | M | 68 | (Colombia) Yonny Hernández | Ret | Ret | 14 | 15 | Ret | 16 | 17 | Ret | 18 | 17 | 11 | 11 | 16 | 16 | 12 | 13 | Ret | Ret | | 97 | 10th |
| 2017 | Pull&Bear Aspar Team | Ducati Desmosedici GP15 | M | | | QAT | ARG | AME | ESP | FRA | ITA | CAT | NED | GER | CZE | AUT | GBR | SMR | ARA | JPN | AUS | MAL | VAL | | 107 | 9th |
| 2017 | Pull&Bear Aspar Team | Ducati Desmosedici GP15 | M | 17 | (Czech Republic) Karel Abraham | 14 | 10 | Ret | 15 | Ret | 16 | 14 | 7 | 17 | 13 | 14 | 13 | 17 | Ret | Ret | 14 | Ret | 14 | | 107 | 9th |
| 2017 | Pull&Bear Aspar Team | Ducati Desmosedici GP16 | M | 19 | (Spain) Álvaro Bautista | Ret | 4 | 15 | Ret | Ret | 5 | 7 | Ret | 6 | Ret | 8 | 10 | 12 | 8 | Ret | 17 | 11 | Ret | | 107 | 9th |
| 2018 | Ángel Nieto Team | Ducati Desmosedici GP16 | M | | | QAT | ARG | AME | ESP | FRA | ITA | CAT | NED | GER | CZE | AUT | GBR | SMR | ARA | THA | JPN | AUS | MAL | VAL | 104 | 8th |
| 2018 | Ángel Nieto Team | Ducati Desmosedici GP16 | M | 7 | (Australia) Mike Jones | | | | | | | | | | | | | | | | | 18 | | | 104 | 8th |
| 2018 | Ángel Nieto Team | Ducati Desmosedici GP16 | M | 17 | (Czech Republic) Karel Abraham | 15 | 20 | Ret | 18 | 17 | Ret | 13 | Ret | 18 | 18 | 21 | C | 20 | 15 | 17 | Ret | 11 | Ret | 14 | 104 | 8th |
| 2018 | Ángel Nieto Team | Ducati Desmosedici GP17 | M | 19 | (Spain) Álvaro Bautista | 13 | 16 | 15 | 8 | Ret | 9 | 9 | 9 | 5 | 9 | 10 | C | 9 | Ret | 8 | 5 | | 7 | Ret | 104 | 8th |

Notes

* Season still in progress.

== See also ==
- Onde 2000
