= Adrián Martín (motorcyclist) =

Spanish motorcycle racer

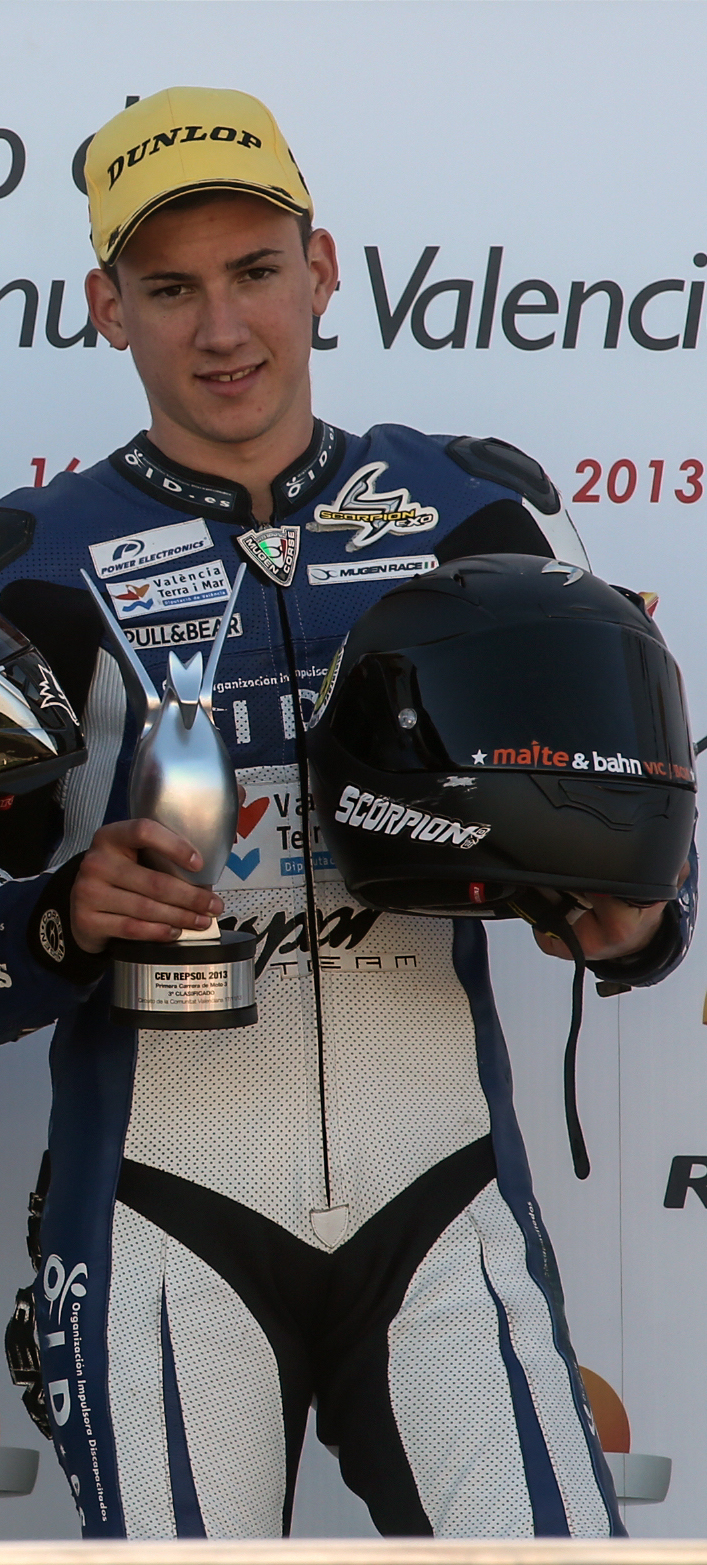
- Martín in 2013
- Nationality: Spanish
- Born: 9 July 1992 (age 34); Valencia, Spain
Motorcycle racing career statistics
Moto3 World Championship
| Active years | 2012 |
| Manufacturers | Honda, FTR Honda |
| 2012 championship position | 24th (16 pts) |
Starts / Wins / Podiums / Poles / F. laps / Points; 16 / 0 / 0 / 0 / 0 / 16
125cc World Championship
| Active years | 2008, 2010–2011 |
| Manufacturers | Aprilia |
| 2011 championship position | 13th (45 pts) |
Starts / Wins / Podiums / Poles / F. laps / Points; 38 / 0 / 0 / 0 / 1 / 81

Adrián Martín Lucas (born 9 July 1992) is a Spanish Grand Prix motorcycle racer. He has previously competed in the Spanish 125GP championship and the Spanish Moto3 Championship.

== Career statistics ==
=== CEV Buckler Moto3 Championship ===
| Year | Bike | 1 | 2 | 3 | 4 | 5 | 6 | 7 | 8 | 9 | 10 | 11 | Pos | Pts |
|---|---|---|---|---|---|---|---|---|---|---|---|---|---|---|
| 2013 | Kalex KTM | **CAT1**; Ret | **CAT2**; 1 | **ARA**; Ret | ALB1; Ret | ALB2; 1 | NAV; 6 | VAL1; 3 | VAL1; 3 | JER; 3 | | | 3rd | 108 |
| 2014 | KTM | JER1 | JER2 | LMS | ARA; Ret | CAT1; 13 | CAT2; 17 | ALB; 13 | NAV | ALG | VAL1 | VAL1 | 28th | 6 |

=== Grand Prix motorcycle racing ===
==== By season ====
| Season | Class | Motorcycle | Team | Number | Race | Win | Podium | Pole | FLap | Pts | Plcd |
|---|---|---|---|---|---|---|---|---|---|---|---|
| 2008 | 125 cc | Aprilia | Bancaja Aspar Team | 26 | 5 | 0 | 0 | 0 | 0 | 1 | 33rd |
| 2010 | 125 cc | Aprilia | Aeroport de Castello-Ajo | 26 | 16 | 0 | 0 | 0 | 0 | 35 | 15th |
| 2011 | 125 cc | Aprilia | Bankia Aspar Team 125cc | 26 | 17 | 0 | 0 | 0 | 1 | 45 | 13th |
| 2012 | Moto3 | Honda | JHK T-Shirt Laglisse | 26 | 16 | 0 | 0 | 0 | 0 | 16 | 24th |
| 2012 | Moto3 | FTR Honda | JHK T-Shirt Laglisse | 26 | 16 | 0 | 0 | 0 | 0 | 16 | 24th |
| Total | | | | | **54** | **0** | **0** | **0** | **1** | **97** | |

==== By class ====
| Class | Seasons | 1st GP | 1st Pod | 1st Win | Race | Win | Podiums | Pole | FLap | Pts |
|---|---|---|---|---|---|---|---|---|---|---|
| 125 cc | 2008, 2010–2011 | 2008 San Marino | | | 38 | 0 | 0 | 0 | 1 | 81 |
| Moto3 | 2012 | 2012 Qatar | | | 16 | 0 | 0 | 0 | 0 | 16 |
| Total | 2008, 2010–2012 | | | | **54** | **0** | **0** | **0** | **1** | **97** |

==== Races by year ====
(key) (Races in bold indicate pole position)

| Yr | Class | Bike | 1 | 2 | 3 | 4 | 5 | 6 | 7 | 8 | 9 | 10 | 11 | 12 | 13 | 14 | 15 | 16 | 17 | Final Pos | Pts |
|---|---|---|---|---|---|---|---|---|---|---|---|---|---|---|---|---|---|---|---|---|---|
| 2008 | 125 cc | Aprilia | QAT | SPA | POR | CHN | FRA | ITA | CAT | GBR | NED | GER | CZE | RSM; Ret | INP | JPN; 25 | AUS; 17 | MAL; 15 | VAL; Ret | 33rd | 1 |
| 2010 | 125 cc | Aprilia | QAT; 20 | SPA; 13 | FRA; 15 | ITA; WD | GBR; 16 | NED; 16 | CAT; 11 | GER; Ret | CZE; 11 | INP; Ret | RSM; 15 | ARA; 11 | JPN; 9 | MAL; 13 | AUS; 11 | POR; Ret | VAL; Ret | 15th | 35 |
| 2011 | 125 cc | Aprilia | QAT; 28 | SPA; 12 | POR; 9 | FRA; 14 | CAT; 9 | GBR; 6 | NED; 33 | ITA; Ret | GER; Ret | CZE; Ret | INP; Ret | RSM; 26 | ARA; 9 | JPN; 8 | AUS; 27 | MAL; Ret | VAL; NC | 13th | 45 |
| 2012 | Moto3 | Honda | QAT; 20 | | | | | | | | | | | | | | | | | 24th | 16 |
| 2012 | Moto3 | FTR Honda | | SPA; Ret | POR; Ret | FRA; Ret | CAT; 17 | GBR; Ret | NED; 18 | GER; Ret | ITA; 13 | INP; Ret | CZE; 13 | RSM; DNS | ARA; Ret | JPN; 17 | MAL; 10 | AUS; 12 | VAL; Ret | 24th | 16 |
