= Luca Amato =

German motorcycle racer (born 1996)

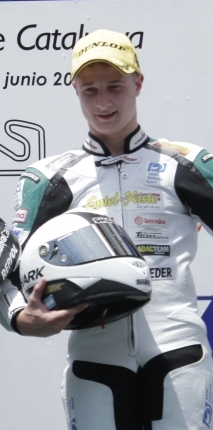
- Amato in 2012
- Nationality: German
- Born: 24 August 1996 (age 30); Bergisch Gladbach, Germany
Motorcycle racing career statistics
Moto3 World Championship
Active years	2012–2013
Manufacturers	Mahindra, Kalex KTM, Suter Honda
2013 championship position	NC (0 pts)
Starts / Wins / Podiums / Poles / F. laps / Points; 14 / 0 / 0 / 0 / 0 / 0

Luca Amato (born 24 August 1996) is a German former Grand Prix motorcycle racer.

== Career ==
=== Early career ===
Amato was born in Bergisch Gladbach, Germany. He started riding a minicross motorbike at the age of eight. He later switched to road racing and was crowned German Mini-Bike champion in 2007 and 2008. Amato also won the ADAC-promoted 125cc Junior Cup. After this, he was given financial support through the ADAC Foundation. In 2012, Amato joined the Spanish CEV Moto3 Championship, where he claimed one win at Motorland Aragón, as well as three podiums in total. This placed him as championship runner-up in the overall results at the end of the season, behind Álex Márquez and in front for 2022 and 2023 MotoGP World Champion Francesco Bagnaia.

=== Moto3 World Championship ===
==== Aspar Team (2012) ====
Amato made his Grand Prix debut at the 2012 Aragon motorcycle Grand Prix with Aspar Team, and would go on to finish the remainder of the season with the same team.

==== Ambrogio Racing (2013) ====
In 2013, Amato signed with Ambrogio Racing to replace Danny Webb from the tenth round onwards, on board a Mahindra, after a switch from Suter Honda.

After failing to show improvement in 2012 and 2013, Amato was left without a seat for 2014, and bowed out of motorcycle racing due to lack of funding.

== Career statistics ==
=== CEV Buckler Moto3 Championship ===
==== Races by year ====
(key) (Races in bold indicate pole position, races in italics indicate fastest lap)

Year	Bike	1	2	3	4	5	6	7	8	9	Pos	Pts
2012	FTR Honda	JER; Ret	NAV; 4	ARA; 1	CAT; 3	ALB1; 2	ALB2; Ret	VAL; 12			2nd	78
2013	FTR Honda	CAT1; Ret	CAT2; 4	ARA; 15	**ALB1**; Ret	ALB2	NAV	VAL1	VAL1	JER	20th	14

=== Grand Prix motorcycle racing ===
==== By season ====
Season	Class	Motorcycle	Team	Race	Win	Podium	Pole	FLap	Pts	Plcd
2012	Moto3	Kalex KTM	Mapfre Aspar Team Moto3	5	0	0	0	0	0	NC
2013	Moto3	Mahindra	Mahindra Spiel-Kiste	9	0	0	0	0	0	NC
2013	Moto3	Suter Honda	Ambrogio Racing	9	0	0	0	0	0	NC
2013	Moto3	Mahindra	Ambrogio Racing	9	0	0	0	0	0	NC
Total				**14**	**0**	**0**	**0**	**0**	**0**	

==== By class ====
Class	Seasons	1st GP	1st Pod	1st Win	Race	Win	Podiums	Pole	FLap	Pts
Moto3	2012–2013	2012 Aragon			14	0	0	0	0	0
Total	2012–2013				**14**	**0**	**0**	**0**	**0**	**0**

==== Races by year ====
Year	Class	Bike	1	2	3	4	5	6	7	8	9	10	11	12	13	14	15	16	17	Pos	Points
2012	Moto3	Kalex KTM	QAT	SPA	POR	FRA	CAT	GBR	NED	GER	ITA	INP	CZE	RSM	ARA; 20	JPN; 22	MAL; 24	AUS; Ret	VAL; 22	NC	0
2013	Moto3	Mahindra	QAT	AME	SPA	FRA	ITA	CAT	NED	GER; Ret	INP			RSM; 24	ARA; 25	MAL; 20	AUS; 28	JPN; Ret	VAL; Ret	NC	0
2013	Moto3	Suter Honda										CZE; 30	GBR; 26							NC	0
