= Julián Simón =

Spanish motorcycle racer (born 1987)

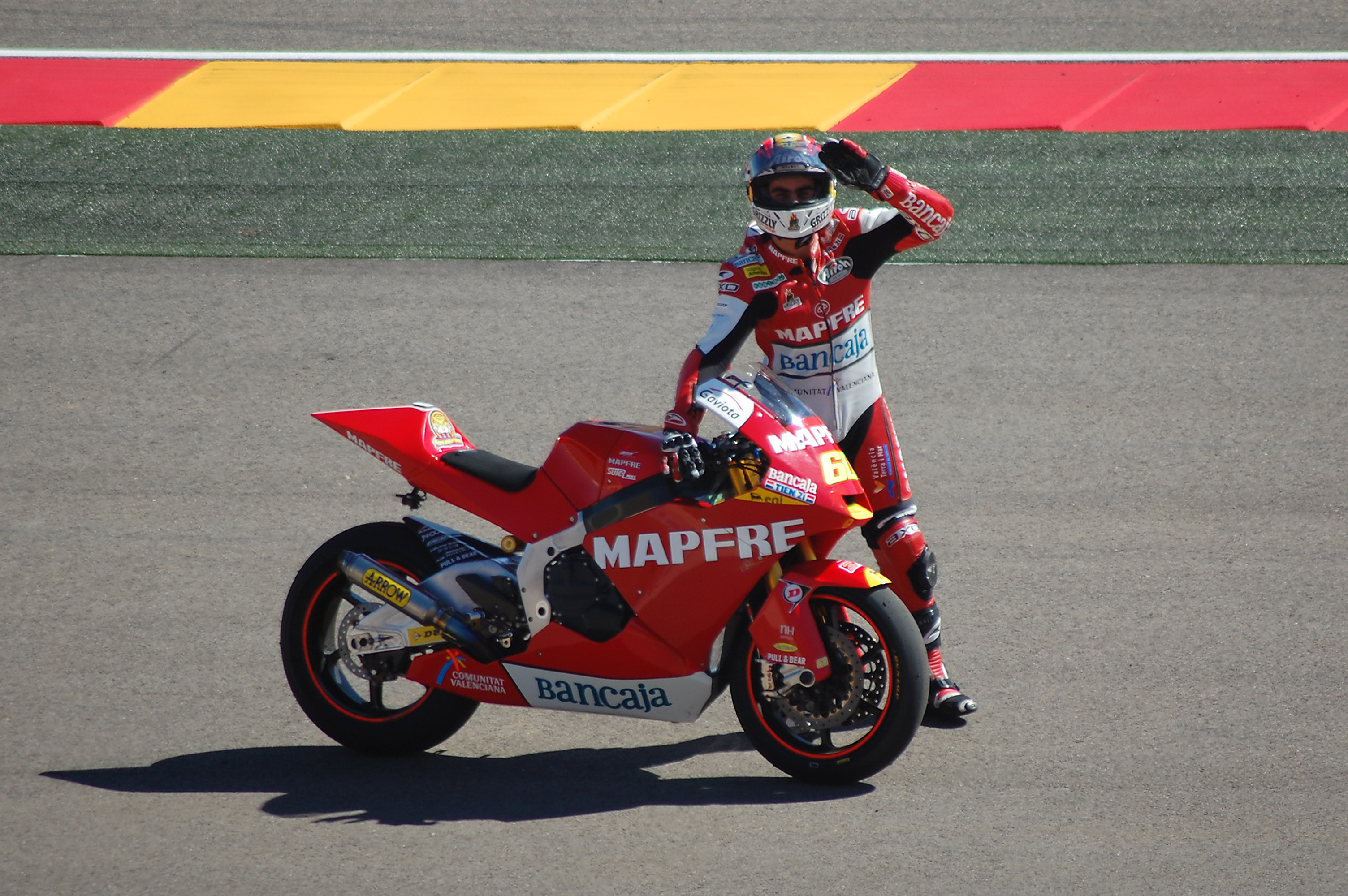
- Simón at the 2010 Aragon Grand Prix
- Nationality: Spanish
- Born: 3 April 1987 (age 39); Villacañas, Spain
Motorcycle racing career statistics
Moto2 World Championship
| Active years | 2010–2017 |
| Manufacturers | RSV, Suter, FTR, Kalex, Speed Up, Tech 3 |
| Championships | 0 |
| 2017 championship position | 40th (0 pts) |
Starts / Wins / Podiums / Poles / F. laps / Points; 116 / 0 / 12 / 3 / 5 / 585
250cc World Championship
| Active years | 2007–2008 |
| Manufacturers | Honda, KTM |
| Championships | 0 |
| 2008 championship position | 10th (109 pts) |
Starts / Wins / Podiums / Poles / F. laps / Points; 33 / 0 / 0 / 0 / 0 / 232
125cc World Championship
| Active years | 2002–2006, 2009 |
| Manufacturers | Honda, Malaguti, KTM, Aprilia |
| Championships | 1 (2009) |
| 2009 championship position | 1st (289 pts) |
Starts / Wins / Podiums / Poles / F. laps / Points; 78 / 8 / 14 / 7 / 7 / 575
Superbike World Championship
| Active years | 2017 |
| Manufacturers | Aprilia |
| Championships | 0 |
| 2017 championship position | 34th (4 pts) |
Starts / Wins / Podiums / Poles / F. laps / Points; 2 / 0 / 0 / 0 / 0 / 4

Julián Simón Sesmero (born 3 April 1987) is a Spanish motorcycle racer. He is best known for winning the 2009 125cc World Championship.

== Career ==
=== 125cc World Championship ===
Born in Villacañas, Toledo, Spain, Simón began his racing career racing for Honda in the 2002 Grand Prix motorcycle racing season at the Spanish Grand Prix. In 2003 he raced for Malaguti before switching to Aprilia in 2004 and KTM in 2005. He won the 2005 125cc British Grand Prix.

=== 250cc World Championship ===
In 2007, Simón raced in the 250cc class for the Repsol Honda team, before riding a KTM in 2008.

=== Return to 125cc ===
In 2009, Simón signed with the Mapfre Aspar team to compete in the 125 class. He famously celebrated winning a race a lap before the race finished, allowing himself to be overtaken. He eventually finished fourth. He was dominant at the subsequent Sachsenring race, dominating both wet qualifying and the dry race. This set the tone for a dominant season in which he clinched the title by overtaking closest rival Bradley Smith on the final lap at Phillip Island. He then also beat Smith to win the final two races of the year.

=== Moto2 World Championship ===
For 2010, Simón stepped up to the new Moto2 class with Mapfre Aspar, initially on an RSV chassis but switching to Suter after the first two rounds. He scored his first podium – and his team's first podium – in the class at the French round at Le Mans, moving into fourth place in the championship standings.

== Career statistics ==
=== Grand Prix motorcycle racing ===
==== By season ====
| Season | Class | Motorcycle | Team | Race | Win | Podium | Pole | FLap | Pts | Plcd |
|---|---|---|---|---|---|---|---|---|---|---|
| 2002 | 125cc | Honda | Telefónica MoviStar Junior Team | 4 | 0 | 0 | 0 | 0 | 2 | 37th |
| 2003 | 125cc | Malaguti | Semprucci Angaia Malaguti | 16 | 0 | 0 | 0 | 0 | 4 | 29th |
| 2004 | 125cc | Honda | Angaia Racing | 14 | 0 | 0 | 0 | 0 | 60 | 14th |
| 2005 | 125cc | KTM | Red Bull KTM GP125 | 15 | 1 | 1 | 0 | 0 | 123 | 7th |
| 2006 | 125cc | KTM | Red Bull KTM GP 125 | 13 | 0 | 1 | 0 | 0 | 97 | 9th |
| 2007 | 250cc | Honda | Repsol Honda 250cc | 17 | 0 | 0 | 0 | 0 | 123 | 9th |
| 2008 | 250cc | KTM | Repsol KTM 250cc | 16 | 0 | 0 | 0 | 0 | 109 | 10th |
| 2009 | 125cc | Aprilia | Bancaja Aspar Team 125cc | 16 | 7 | 12 | 7 | 7 | 289 | **1st** |
| 2010 | Moto2 | RSV | Mapfre Aspar Team | 17 | 0 | 8 | 3 | 3 | 201 | **2nd** |
| 2010 | Moto2 | Suter | Mapfre Aspar Team | 17 | 0 | 8 | 3 | 3 | 201 | **2nd** |
| 2011 | Moto2 | Suter | Mapfre Aspar Team Moto2 | 10 | 0 | 1 | 0 | 0 | 68 | 14th |
| 2012 | Moto2 | FTR | Blusens Avintia | 17 | 0 | 2 | 0 | 0 | 81 | 13th |
| 2012 | Moto2 | Suter | Blusens Avintia | 17 | 0 | 2 | 0 | 0 | 81 | 13th |
| 2013 | Moto2 | Kalex | Italtrans Racing Team | 17 | 0 | 0 | 0 | 2 | 81 | 13th |
| 2014 | Moto2 | Kalex | Italtrans Racing Team | 18 | 0 | 0 | 0 | 0 | 56 | 17th |
| 2015 | Moto2 | Speed Up | QMMF Racing Team | 18 | 0 | 0 | 0 | 0 | 58 | 18th |
| 2016 | Moto2 | Speed Up | QMMF Racing Team | 16 | 0 | 1 | 0 | 0 | 40 | 18th |
| 2017 | Moto2 | Kalex | Garage Plus Interwetten | 3 | 0 | 0 | 0 | 0 | 0 | 40th |
| 2017 | Moto2 | Tech 3 | Tech 3 Racing | 3 | 0 | 0 | 0 | 0 | 0 | 40th |
| Total | | | | **227** | **8** | **26** | **10** | **12** | **1392** | |

==== By class ====
| Class | Seasons | 1st GP | 1st Pod | 1st Win | Race | Win | Podiums | Pole | FLap | Pts | WChmp |
|---|---|---|---|---|---|---|---|---|---|---|---|
| 125cc | 2002–2006, 2009 | 2002 Spain | 2005 Great Britain | 2005 Great Britain | 78 | 8 | 14 | 7 | 7 | 575 | 1 |
| 250cc | 2007–2008 | 2007 Qatar | | | 33 | 0 | 0 | 0 | 0 | 232 | 0 |
| Moto2 | 2010–2017 | 2010 Qatar | 2010 France | | 116 | 0 | 12 | 3 | 5 | 585 | 0 |
| Total | 2002–2017 | | | | **227** | **8** | **26** | **10** | **12** | **1392** | **1** |

==== Races by year ====
(key) (Races in bold indicate pole position; races in italics indicate fastest lap)

| Year | Class | Bike | 1 | 2 | 3 | 4 | 5 | 6 | 7 | 8 | 9 | 10 | 11 | 12 | 13 | 14 | 15 | 16 | 17 | 18 | Pos | Pts |
|---|---|---|---|---|---|---|---|---|---|---|---|---|---|---|---|---|---|---|---|---|---|---|
| 2002 | 125cc | Honda | JPN | RSA | SPA; Ret | FRA | ITA | CAT; 22 | NED | GBR | GER | CZE | POR; 14 | BRA | PAC | MAL | AUS | VAL; Ret | | | 37th | 2 |
| 2003 | 125cc | Malaguti | JPN; 19 | RSA; 27 | SPA; Ret | FRA; 20 | ITA; Ret | CAT; 24 | NED; 17 | GBR; 18 | GER; 20 | CZE; 22 | POR; Ret | BRA; 25 | PAC; 24 | MAL; 25 | AUS; 12 | VAL; 19 | | | 29th | 4 |
| 2004 | 125cc | Honda | RSA; 11 | SPA; 11 | FRA; 13 | ITA; 20 | CAT; 14 | NED; 19 | BRA; 14 | GER; 9 | GBR; 8 | CZE; 10 | POR; WD | JPN | QAT; 7 | MAL; 6 | AUS; 20 | VAL; 13 | | | 14th | 60 |
| 2005 | 125cc | KTM | SPA; 9 | POR; 9 | CHN; 10 | FRA; 8 | ITA; 7 | CAT; 8 | NED; 6 | GBR; 1 | GER; 5 | CZE; 10 | JPN; Ret | MAL; 6 | QAT; 8 | AUS; Ret | TUR | VAL; 8 | | | 7th | 123 |
| 2006 | 125cc | KTM | SPA; 5 | QAT; 10 | TUR; 11 | CHN; 5 | FRA; 12 | ITA; 7 | CAT; Ret | NED | GBR | GER | CZE; Ret | MAL; 4 | AUS; 5 | JPN; 3 | POR; 5 | VAL; Ret | | | 9th | 97 |
| 2007 | 250cc | Honda | QAT; 8 | SPA; Ret | TUR; 7 | CHN; 7 | FRA; 5 | ITA; 7 | CAT; 10 | GBR; 7 | NED; Ret | GER; Ret | CZE; 8 | RSM; 10 | POR; 8 | JPN; 6 | AUS; 6 | MAL; 6 | VAL; 6 | | 9th | 123 |
| 2008 | 250cc | KTM | QAT; 11 | SPA; 7 | POR; 7 | CHN; Ret | FRA; 8 | ITA; 11 | CAT; 9 | GBR; 8 | NED; 10 | GER; 5 | CZE; 12 | RSM; 5 | INP; C | JPN; 4 | AUS; 4 | MAL; Ret | VAL; Ret | | 10th | 109 |
| 2009 | 125cc | Aprilia | **QAT**; 2 | JPN; 2 | **SPA**; Ret | FRA; 1 | ITA; 3 | **CAT**; 4 | NED; 2 | **GER**; 1 | GBR; 1 | CZE; 2 | **INP**; 5 | RSM; 1 | **POR**; 12 | AUS; 1 | MAL; 1 | **VAL**; 1 | | | **1st** | **289** |
| 2010 | Moto2 | RSV | QAT; Ret | SPA; 8 | | | | | | | | | | | | | | | | | **2nd** | **201** |
| 2010 | Moto2 | Suter | | | FRA; 2 | ITA; 9 | GBR; 3 | NED; 6 | CAT; 3 | GER; Ret | CZE; 5 | **INP**; 2 | RSM; 2 | ARA; 2 | **JPN**; 2 | **MAL**; 21 | AUS; 4 | POR; 12 | VAL; 3 | | **2nd** | **201** |
| 2011 | Moto2 | Suter | QAT; 10 | SPA; 6 | POR; 2 | FRA; 4 | CAT; Ret | GBR | NED | ITA | GER; Ret | CZE; DNS | INP; 7 | RSM; 12 | ARA; 17 | JPN | AUS | MAL | VAL; 10 | | 14th | 68 |
| 2012 | Moto2 | FTR | QAT; 15 | | | | | | | | | | | | | | | | | | 13th | 81 |
| 2012 | Moto2 | Suter | | SPA; 23 | POR; 8 | FRA; 12 | CAT; Ret | GBR; 22 | NED; 14 | GER; 15 | ITA; 14 | INP; 3 | CZE; 11 | RSM; 12 | ARA; 17 | JPN; 11 | MAL; 4 | AUS; Ret | VAL; 2 | | 13th | 81 |
| 2013 | Moto2 | Kalex | QAT; 6 | AME; 19 | SPA; 16 | FRA; 8 | ITA; 17 | CAT; 15 | NED; 10 | GER; 4 | INP; 11 | CZE; Ret | GBR; 12 | RSM; 12 | ARA; 8 | MAL; 10 | AUS; Ret | JPN; 5 | VAL; 11 | | 13th | 81 |
| 2014 | Moto2 | Kalex | QAT; 16 | AME; 23 | ARG; 17 | SPA; 14 | FRA; Ret | ITA; 22 | CAT; 12 | NED; 7 | GER; 16 | INP; Ret | CZE; 7 | GBR; 12 | RSM; 8 | ARA; 16 | JPN; 6 | AUS; 20 | MAL; 6 | VAL; Ret | 17th | 56 |
| 2015 | Moto2 | Speed Up | QAT; 13 | AME; 9 | ARG; 26 | SPA; 11 | FRA; 6 | ITA; 7 | CAT; 15 | NED; 11 | GER; 9 | INP; Ret | CZE; 18 | GBR; 18 | RSM; 5 | ARA; Ret | JPN; 16 | AUS; 18 | MAL; 25 | VAL; 18 | 18th | 58 |
| 2016 | Moto2 | Speed Up | QAT; Ret | ARG; 19 | AME; 9 | SPA; DNS | FRA; Ret | ITA; 17 | CAT; 13 | NED; 16 | GER; 3 | AUT; 15 | CZE; 13 | GBR; 14 | RSM; Ret | ARA; 21 | JPN; 8 | AUS; Ret | MAL; WD | VAL; 23 | 18th | 40 |
| 2017 | Moto2 | Kalex | QAT; 23 | ARG; 18 | | | | | | | | | | | | | | | | | 40th | 0 |
| 2017 | Moto2 | Tech 3 | | | AME; Ret | SPA | FRA | ITA | CAT | NED | GER | CZE | AUT | GBR | RSM | ARA | JPN | AUS | MAL | VAL | 40th | 0 |

=== Superbike World Championship ===
==== Races by year ====
(key) (Races in bold indicate pole position; races in italics indicate fastest lap)

| Year | Bike | 1 | | 2 | | 3 | | 4 | | 5 | | 6 | | 7 | | 8 | | 9 | | 10 | | 11 | | 12 | | 13 | | Pos | Pts |
| Year | Bike | R1 | R2 | R1 | R2 | R1 | R2 | R1 | R2 | R1 | R2 | R1 | R2 | R1 | R2 | R1 | R2 | R1 | R2 | R1 | R2 | R1 | R2 | R1 | R2 | R1 | R2 | Pos | Pts |
|---|---|---|---|---|---|---|---|---|---|---|---|---|---|---|---|---|---|---|---|---|---|---|---|---|---|---|---|---|---|
| 2017 | Aprilia | AUS | AUS | THA | THA | SPA; 13 | SPA; 15 | NED | NED | ITA | ITA | GBR | GBR | ITA | ITA | USA | USA | GER | GER | POR | POR | FRA | FRA | SPA | SPA | QAT | QAT | 34th | 4 |
