= 2012 Australian motorcycle Grand Prix =

(Australia) 2012 Australian Grand Prix
Race details
- Race 17 of 18 races in the 2012 Grand Prix motorcycle racing season
- Date: 28 October 2012
- Official name: AirAsia Australian Motorcycle Grand Prix
- Location: Phillip Island Grand Prix Circuit
- Course: Permanent racing facility; 4.448 km (2.764 mi)

MotoGP
Pole position
Rider	(Australia) Casey Stoner	Honda
Time	1:29.623	
Fastest lap
Rider	(Australia) Casey Stoner	Honda
Time	1:30.191	
Podium
First	(Australia) Casey Stoner	Honda
Second	(Spain) Jorge Lorenzo	Yamaha
Third	(United Kingdom) Cal Crutchlow	Yamaha

Moto2
Pole position
Rider	(Spain) Pol Espargaró	Kalex
Time	1:33.705	
Fastest lap
Rider	(Spain) Pol Espargaró	Kalex
Time	1:33.729	
Podium
First	(Spain) Pol Espargaró	Kalex
Second	(Spain) Marc Márquez	Suter
Third	(United Kingdom) Scott Redding	Kalex

Moto3
Pole position
Rider	(Germany) Sandro Cortese	KTM
Time	1:38.334	
Fastest lap
Rider	(Italy) Alessandro Tonucci	FTR Honda
Time	1:38.447	
Podium
First	(Germany) Sandro Cortese	KTM
Second	(Portugal) Miguel Oliveira	Suter Honda
Third	(Australia) Arthur Sissis	KTM

The 2012 Australian motorcycle Grand Prix was the seventeenth and penultimate round of the 2012 Grand Prix motorcycle racing season. It took place on the weekend of 26–28 October 2012 at the Phillip Island Grand Prix Circuit.

== MotoGP race report ==
This race was most notable for the last victory of Casey Stoner before he chose to retire, as well as his final win on home soil.

Jorge Lorenzo leads the standings with 330 points, followed by Dani Pedrosa with 307 and Casey Stoner with 213 points. Pedrosa has a 23-point deficit to Lorenzo, and if he scores three or more points in this race, he will be crowned the 2012 MotoGP world champion. Australian Kris McLaren was not able to qualify for the race in his Avintia Bluesens, therefor he did not start the race.

Home hero Casey Stoner took pole on Saturday with a time of 1:29.623. Second is Jorge Lorenzo and third is Dani Pedrosa. The second row of the grid consists out of Cal Crutchlow, Stefan Bradl and Andrea Dovizioso.

All the riders do their usual warm-up lap, then line up on their respective grid slots. As the lights go out, Lorenzo and Pedrosa manage to pass Stoner who gets demoted to third as the pack goes into Doohan Corner (Turn 1) on the opening lap. Behind the trio, Crutchlow has not gained or lost any positions, Dovizioso took one place while Bradl lost one to the Italian. Going into the Honda Corner (Turn 4), Dani Pedrosa lunges down the inside of Lorenzo to take over the lead. The top three already has pulled a significant gap to Crutchlow by now.

Lap two starts and Stoner manages to get a great drive out of Turn 12 to go side-by-side with Lorenzo on the straight. He manages to get past going into Doohan Corner, promoting him to second. As the trio goes into the Honda Hairpin, Pedrosa loses the front of his bike and slides out of the lead, as well as the title upon acceleration. A confused and defeated Pedrosa tries to rejoin the race, but to no avail as he is dead last and a long way back to his title rival. The Yamaha pit box rushes to put on the message 'PEDROSA OUT' on the pit board.

As lap three begins, the gap Stoner has to Lorenzo has increased, as did the gap Lorenzo has to now third place Crutchlow. Pedrosa comes into the pits to officially retire from the race.

Lap four and Stoner now sets the fastest lap of the race. Behind the duo meanwhile a battle for third emerges, consisting out of Crutchlow, Dovizioso, Bautista and Bradl.

Exiting Turn 12, Stoner has a big wobble before he starts lap five. The group of four behind Lorenzo are still bunched up but no one has made a move so far.

On lap six, the gap Stoner has to Lorenzo is +1.750 seconds. The group of four who was fighting for third has spread out a bit by now.

Lap seven and the gap Stoner has to Lorenzo has increased to +1.983 seconds. James Ellison in the back crashed out of the race - rider is okay.

On lap eight, no overtakes happened in the top six positions. The gaps are stable for now.

Lap nine and the gap Stoner has to Lorenzo has increased even more - it is now +3.038 seconds. Third place Crutchlow has also opened up a gap to his Tech 3 teammate Dovizioso and it's now +1.050 seconds. Backmarker Colin Edwards has also retired from the race due to technical problems.

On lap ten, the gap Stoner has to Lorenzo is more or less stable and sits at around +3.074 seconds. In sector one, the gap has decreased slightly to +2.996. Dovizioso and Bautista meanwhile are also fighting for fourth, the Spaniard shadowing Dovizioso to find a gap. In sector two, the gap has increased again to +3.224 seconds. In sector three, the gap increases slightly once more to +3.283 seconds.

As Stoner crosses the line to start lap eleven, the gap he has to Lorenzo is more or less stable with +3.328 seconds. Further back, Bautista is still harassing Dovizioso and even further back Karel Abraham is sandwiched between the Factory Ducati pair of Valentino Rossi in seventh and Nicky Hayden in ninth.

On lap twelve, Bautista finally makes his move at the Honda Corner, lunging down the inside of Dovizioso and snatching away fourth. This has allowed Bradl - who was a bit further back, to immediately close the gap and join the battle.

Lap thirteen and Bradl also makes his move on Dovizioso, going up his inside at the fast Southern Loop (Turn 2) for fifth position.

As the midfield trio of Bautista, Bradl and Dovizioso cross the line to begin lap fourteen - the halfway point of the race - the German uses his superior exit of Turn 12 to go alongside Bautista and move up into fourth before Doohan Corner. Dovizioso uses the situation to sneak up on Bautista at the Southern Loop by going up his inside and retaking fifth. However, the Italian goes slightly wide, allowing Bautista to retake the place. At the Honda Corner, Dovizioso tries again - this time successfully taking the place after he went up the inside of Bautista's San Carlo Gresini Honda. The gap Stoner has to Lorenzo meanwhile has increased to +4.127 seconds.

On lap fifteen, the gap has decreased somewhat to +3.992 seconds. In sector 1, the gap increases to +4.133 seconds.

Lap sixteen and the midfield runners are still relatively close to each other, with Bautista right behind Dovizioso who himself is a bit further back to Bradl. Dani Pedrosa is now giving an interview for the Spanish television about what exactly happened.

On lap seventeen, the gap Stoner has to Lorenzo has increased again and is now +4.767 seconds. Further back, the trio of Bradl, Dovizioso and Bautista are closing up again and even further back, Hayden passed Abraham for eighth place and is now behind his teammate Rossi.

Lap eighteen and the top three is still very much stable, consisting out of Stoner, Lorenzo and Crutchlow.

On lap nineteen, the trio of Bradl, Dovizioso and Bautista are still relatively close but no one has made a move so far.

Going into lap twenty, Bautista is very close to Dovizioso and looks to make a move, but stays back for the time being. As they both go into Doohan Corner, Dovizioso runs slightly wide, causing Bautista to run wide as well.

As lap twenty-one starts, Roberto Rolfo has retired from the race with technical problems as he is seen pushing his bike on the grass with the marshalls surrounding him. Bautista looks up the inside of Dovizioso at the start/finish straight but does not make the move going into Doohan corner. Further back, Aleix Espargaró has overtaken his Aspar teammate Randy de Puniet for tenth position after the Frenchman went wide at the Honda Corner.

On lap twenty-two, Bautista managed to pass Dovizioso before the start/finish straight but the Italian dived down the inside at the Doohan corner and retakes fifth place as a result. Bradl starts to struggle a bit now and the two behind him close the small gap, with Bautista harassing Dovizioso all throughout the lap.

Lap twenty-three and Dovizioso has passed Bradl for fourth. Backmarker Iván Silva lets Lorenzo past without any problems as the midfield trio of Dovizioso, Bradl and Bautista are still close to each other and fighting for positions.

On lap twenty-four, Bautista takes fifth place by going down the inside of Bradl - who was taking a wider line - at Honda Corner.

Lap twenty-five and Dovizioso and Bautista have pulled a slight gap to the now struggling Bradl. He shadows the Italian but so far refrains from making any moves.

On lap twenty-six, the penultimate lap, Stoner passes backmarker Michele Pirro midway through Doohan Corner without any problems. Further behind, Bradl has closed up the small gap to Bautista again and even further back, Hayden starts to put some pressure on Rossi for seventh position. Bautista has now taken fourth from Dovizioso, with Bradl doing likewise after he dives down the inside of the Tech 3 rider at Turn 10. Dovizioso has lost two places in one lap

The final lap - lap twenty-seven - begins and Dovizioso uses his good acceleration to pass Bradl on the start/finish straight, then makes a late lunge up on the inside of Bautista to take fourth place back. Exiting the Southern Loop, Bautista's knee hit a bit of dirt on the edge of the circuit, causing him to wobble slightly. Stoner meanwhile has no problems as he calmly crosses the line to win the race - his final win of his career, as well as his sixth and final win on home soil. Lorenzo does a big wheelie as he crosses the finish line to come home in second place, making him the 2012 MotoGP world champion. A happy Crutchlow comes home third to take his second podium of the season and the trio behind him still fight for positions, Dovizioso pulling enough of a gap to come home in a respectable fourth place. Bradl tries to attack Bautista on the last corner but isn't able to, meaning that Bautista finishes in fifth and Bradl in sixth place. The Factory Yamaha pit box meanwhile rejoices as they celebrate Lorenzo's title. Rossi finishes a distant seventh and Hayden eighth.

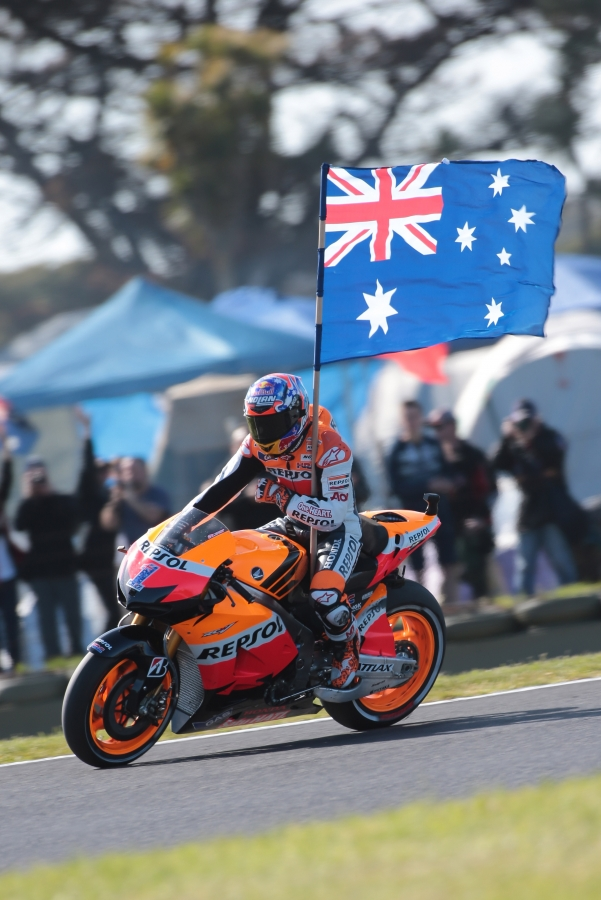
Race winner Casey Stoner, celebrating his last MotoGP win with the Australian flag.

During the parade lap on the way back to parc fermé, one of the Yamaha crewmembers congratulates Lorenzo with him holding a Spanish flag. Lorenzo puts his arms up in the air in jubilation as the crewmembers puts the flag behind his back. Doohan also has his own Australian flag, waving it for all the majority Australian crowd to see. He also waves at the fans as Lorenzo now holds the Spanish flag and punches the air in a joyful manner. The fans now start to invade the track as Crutchlow also rides back to parc fermé, the fans congratulating him also.

Stoner is the first one to arrive at parc fermé, being congratulated by one of his Repsol Honda crewmembers. Lorenzo is the second to arrive, doing a burnout to celebrate his second MotoGP world championship title. Some of his crewmembers hug him after he's done, the Spaniard still celebrating whilst on the bike. He then goes to his crew at the fence to celebrate with them. Crutchlow meanwhile has also arrived and is talking to his own crewmembers about the race result. Espargaró and Stoner both shake hands with the new world champion, the latter also hugging him. Lorenzo then gets interviewed by the Spanish television before posing with his team once more for the press.

The trio make their way up to the podium but before that, Stoner has an intimate moment with his wife Adriana Tuchyna and his first child Alessandra Maria in the box. The trio then make their way onto the podium, beginning with Crutchlow, then Lorenzo and then - under a loud applause and many cheers from the crowd - Stoner. The trio stand on their respective podium places as the trophies get handed out, the crowd cheering loudly once more as Stoner receives his winners trophy.

The Australian national anthem plays and once it stops, Lorenzo steps off the podium, much to the confusion of the other tro riders. The respective figures still hand out the champagne to Crutchlow and Stoner and the duo start spraying each other. Lorenzo meanwhile, holding the bottle in his hand, went down to celebrate with his team as he sprays them with the champagne instead. Stoner shakes hands with Crutchlow after the champagne shower has finished, then gets off the podium also. Crutchlow - the only one still on the podium - hands his team below the bottle, then takes his helmet, drink and trophy to move it somewhere else. Lorenzo and Stoner return to the podium, the Australian throwing his kneesliders in the audience as a gift. The trio then step onto the podium for the last time for the press photo's.

Stoner's win, Lorenzo's second place and Pedrosa's retirement change the standings once more. Lorenzo now has 350 points, an unassailable lead by now, with Pedrosa second with 307 points - a 43-point deficit - and Stoner third with 238 points, which is a deficit of 112 points.

== Moto2 race report ==
Marc Márquez won the Moto2 title by finishing third in his race behind winner and championship rival Pol Espargaró and the second placed Anthony West (who would eventually be removed from the results in November 2013 promoting Marquez to 2nd place).

== Moto3 race report ==
Sandro Cortese won the race, ahead of Miguel Oliveira and Australian Arthur Sissis. This meant that all three riders' titles had been decided with Cortese having secured his title the previous round in Malaysia.

== Classification ==
=== MotoGP ===
Pos.	No.	Rider	Team	Manufacturer	Laps	Time/Retired	Grid	Points
1	1	(Australia) Casey Stoner	Repsol Honda Team	Honda	27	41:01.324	1	25
2	99	(Spain) Jorge Lorenzo	Yamaha Factory Racing	Yamaha	27	+9.223	2	20
3	35	(United Kingdom) Cal Crutchlow	Monster Yamaha Tech 3	Yamaha	27	+14.570	4	16
4	4	(Italy) Andrea Dovizioso	Monster Yamaha Tech 3	Yamaha	27	+23.303	6	13
5	19	(Spain) Álvaro Bautista	San Carlo Honda Gresini	Honda	27	+23.432	7	11
6	6	(Germany) Stefan Bradl	LCR Honda MotoGP	Honda	27	+23.467	5	10
7	46	(Italy) Valentino Rossi	Ducati Team	Ducati	27	+37.113	8	9
8	69	(United States) Nicky Hayden	Ducati Team	Ducati	27	+38.387	10	8
9	17	(Czech Republic) Karel Abraham	Cardion AB Motoracing	Ducati	27	+52.613	11	7
10	41	(Spain) Aleix Espargaró	Power Electronics Aspar	ART	27	+1:00.299	12	6
11	14	(France) Randy De Puniet	Power Electronics Aspar	ART	27	+1:00.342	9	5
12	8	(Spain) Héctor Barberá	Pramac Racing Team	Ducati	27	+1:21.951	13	4
13	9	(Italy) Danilo Petrucci	Came IodaRacing Project	Ioda-Suter	27	+1:27.857	15	3
14	51	(Italy) Michele Pirro	San Carlo Honda Gresini	FTR	26	+1 lap	14	2
15	22	(Spain) Iván Silva	Avintia Blusens	BQR	26	+1 lap	19	1
Ret	84	(Italy) Roberto Rolfo	Speed Master	ART	18	Retirement	18	
Ret	5	(United States) Colin Edwards	NGM Mobile Forward Racing	Suter	6	Retirement	16	
Ret	77	(United Kingdom) James Ellison	Paul Bird Motorsport	ART	5	Accident	17	
Ret	26	(Spain) Dani Pedrosa	Repsol Honda Team	Honda	1	Retirement	3	
DNQ	43	(Australia) Kris McLaren	Avintia Blusens	BQR		Did not qualify		

=== Moto2 ===
Pos	No	Rider	Manufacturer	Laps	Time/Retired	Grid	Points
1	40	(Spain) Pol Espargaró	Kalex	25	39:26.486	1	25
2	93	(Spain) Marc Márquez	Suter	25	+16.837	3	20
3	45	(United Kingdom) Scott Redding	Kalex	25	+16.957	2	16
4	77	(Switzerland) Dominique Aegerter	Suter	25	+26.018	12	13
5	5	(France) Johann Zarco	Motobi	25	+26.028	7	11
6	3	(Italy) Simone Corsi	FTR	25	+26.091	11	10
7	80	(Spain) Esteve Rabat	Kalex	25	+26.372	10	9
8	4	(Switzerland) Randy Krummenacher	Kalex	25	+26.474	6	8
9	30	(Japan) Takaaki Nakagami	Kalex	25	+26.580	5	7
10	81	(Spain) Jordi Torres	Suter	25	+36.520	20	6
11	38	(United Kingdom) Bradley Smith	Tech 3	25	+36.565	15	5
12	24	(Spain) Toni Elías	Kalex	25	+36.870	18	4
13	19	(Belgium) Xavier Siméon	Tech 3	25	+38.220	16	3
14	63	(France) Mike Di Meglio	Kalex	25	+44.350	19	2
15	72	(Japan) Yuki Takahashi	FTR	25	+48.586	27	1
16	88	(Spain) Ricard Cardús	AJR	25	+48.763	21	
17	18	(Spain) Nicolás Terol	Suter	25	+48.768	25	
18	14	(Thailand) Ratthapark Wilairot	Suter	25	+52.487	22	
19	23	(Germany) Marcel Schrötter	Bimota	25	+52.569	24	
20	8	(United Kingdom) Gino Rea	Suter	25	+52.707	23	
21	75	(Japan) Tomoyoshi Koyama	Suter	25	+1:12.087	28	
22	22	(Italy) Alessandro Andreozzi	Speed Up	25	+1:21.455	26	
23	82	(Spain) Elena Rosell	Speed Up	24	+1 lap	29	
24	10	(Switzerland) Marco Colandrea	FTR	24	+1 lap	30	
25	57	(Brazil) Eric Granado	Motobi	23	+2 laps	31	
DSQ	95	(Australia) Anthony West	Speed Up	25	(+16.811)	9	
Ret	36	(Finland) Mika Kallio	Kalex	23	Accident	14	
Ret	49	(Spain) Axel Pons	Kalex	23	Accident	13	
Ret	60	(Spain) Julián Simón	Suter	23	Retirement	17	
Ret	12	(Switzerland) Thomas Lüthi	Suter	17	Retirement	4	
Ret	29	(Italy) Andrea Iannone	Speed Up	4	Retirement	8	
DNS	15	(San Marino) Alex De Angelis	FTR				

=== Moto3 ===
Pos	No	Rider	Manufacturer	Laps	Time/Retired	Grid	Points
1	11	(Germany) Sandro Cortese	KTM	23	38:20.014	1	25
2	44	(Portugal) Miguel Oliveira	Suter Honda	23	+2.108	6	20
3	61	(Australia) Arthur Sissis	KTM	23	+5.031	7	16
4	42	(Spain) Álex Rins	Suter Honda	23	+5.084	16	13
5	52	(United Kingdom) Danny Kent	KTM	23	+5.107	4	11
6	5	(Italy) Romano Fenati	FTR Honda	23	+5.109	14	10
7	19	(Italy) Alessandro Tonucci	FTR Honda	23	+5.374	10	9
8	7	(Spain) Efrén Vázquez	FTR Honda	23	+5.894	3	8
9	12	(Spain) Álex Márquez	Suter Honda	23	+30.783	19	7
10	32	(Spain) Isaac Viñales	FTR Honda	23	+30.911	18	6
11	94	(Germany) Jonas Folger	Kalex KTM	23	+32.803	2	5
12	26	(Spain) Adrián Martín	FTR Honda	23	+33.302	17	4
13	84	(Czech Republic) Jakub Kornfeil	FTR Honda	23	+33.479	13	3
14	41	(South Africa) Brad Binder	Kalex KTM	23	+34.102	20	2
15	39	(Spain) Luis Salom	Kalex KTM	23	+43.749	9	1
16	89	(France) Alan Techer	TSR Honda	23	+43.827	24	
17	23	(Spain) Alberto Moncayo	FTR Honda	23	+49.394	11	
18	80	(Italy) Armando Pontone	Ioda	23	+1:06.551	21	
19	17	(United Kingdom) John McPhee	KRP Honda	23	+1:06.588	22	
20	96	(France) Louis Rossi	FTR Honda	23	+1:08.801	12	
21	8	(Australia) Jack Miller	Honda	23	+1:08.908	23	
22	51	(Japan) Kenta Fujii	TSR Honda	23	+1:10.030	26	
23	30	(Switzerland) Giulian Pedone	Suter Honda	23	+1:10.411	25	
24	75	(Australia) Lincoln Gilding	Honda	23	+1:33.510	28	
25	36	(Australia) Sam Clarke	Honda	22	+1 lap	31	
Ret	63	(Malaysia) Zulfahmi Khairuddin	KTM	19	Accident	5	
Ret	9	(Germany) Toni Finsterbusch	Honda	16	Retirement	30	
Ret	25	(Spain) Maverick Viñales	FTR Honda	14	Retirement	8	
Ret	31	(Finland) Niklas Ajo	KTM	11	Accident	15	
Ret	29	(Germany) Luca Amato	Kalex KTM	8	Retirement	27	
Ret	20	(Italy) Riccardo Moretti	Mahindra	1	Retirement	29	
DNS	28	(Spain) Josep Rodríguez	FGR Honda				
DNS	27	(Italy) Niccolò Antonelli	FTR Honda				
DNS	99	(United Kingdom) Danny Webb	Mahindra				

== Championship standings after the race (MotoGP) ==
Below are the standings for the top five riders and constructors after round seventeen has concluded.

Riders' Championship standings

Pos.	Rider	Points
1	(Spain) Jorge Lorenzo	350
2	(Spain) Dani Pedrosa	307
3	(Australia) Casey Stoner	238
4	(Italy) Andrea Dovizioso	208
5	(Spain) Álvaro Bautista	165

Constructors' Championship standings

Pos.	Constructor	Points
1	(Japan) Honda	387
2	(Japan) Yamaha	366
3	(Italy) Ducati	183
4	(Italy) ART	93
5	(United Kingdom) FTR	32

- Note: Only the top five positions are included for both sets of standings.

Previous race: 2012 Malaysian Grand Prix	FIM Grand Prix World Championship; 2012 season	Next race: 2012 Valencian Grand Prix
Previous race: 2011 Australian Grand Prix	Australian motorcycle Grand Prix	Next race: 2013 Australian Grand Prix
