= 2012 Valencian Community motorcycle Grand Prix =

2012 Valencian Community Grand Prix
Race details
- Race 18 of 18 races in the 2012 Grand Prix motorcycle racing season
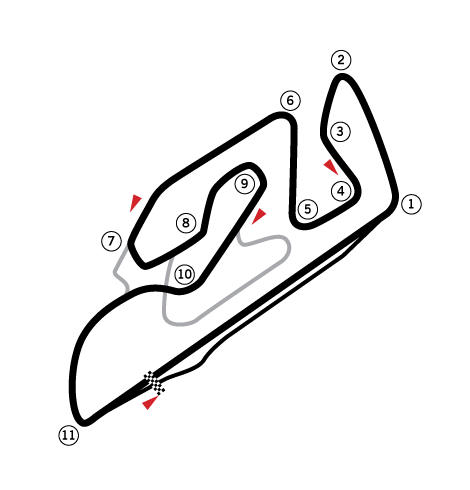
- Date: 11 November 2012
- Official name: Gran Premio Generali de la Comunitat Valenciana
- Location: Circuit Ricardo Tormo
- Course: Permanent racing facility; 4.005 km (2.489 mi)

MotoGP
Pole position
Rider	(Spain) Dani Pedrosa	Honda
Time	1:30.844	
Fastest lap
Rider	(Spain) Dani Pedrosa	Honda
Time	1:33.119	
Podium
First	(Spain) Dani Pedrosa	Honda
Second	(Japan) Katsuyuki Nakasuga	Yamaha
Third	(Australia) Casey Stoner	Honda

Moto2
Pole position
Rider	(Spain) Pol Espargaró	Kalex
Time	1:35.191	
Fastest lap
Rider	(Spain) Marc Márquez	Suter
Time	1:46.440	
Podium
First	(Spain) Marc Márquez	Suter
Second	(Spain) Julián Simón	Suter
Third	(Spain) Nicolás Terol	Suter

Moto3
Pole position
Rider	(Germany) Jonas Folger	Kalex-KTM
Time	1:41.263	
Fastest lap
Rider	(Malaysia) Zulfahmi Khairuddin	KTM
Time	1:49.622	
Podium
First	(United Kingdom) Danny Kent	KTM
Second	(Germany) Sandro Cortese	KTM
Third	(Malaysia) Zulfahmi Khairuddin	KTM

The 2012 Valencian Community motorcycle Grand Prix was the eighteenth and final round of the 2012 Grand Prix motorcycle racing season. It took place on the weekend of 9–11 November 2012 at the Circuito Ricardo Tormo.

The race was Casey Stoner's last before his retirement from the sport, and he took a third place podium finish. Dani Pedrosa won the race for Honda. Newly crowned MotoGP champion Jorge Lorenzo retired from the race, and finished the season 18 points ahead of runner-up Pedrosa in the standings. The result meant that Pedrosa had won 6 of the season's last 8 races, and that Lorenzo maintained his record of finishing first or second in every race he finished in 2012. Katsuyuki Nakasuga made just his second appearance in 2012 in place of the injured Ben Spies at Yamaha, and took advantage of the wet conditions to finish in second place (the only podium for a Japanese rider in any class in 2012).

Marc Márquez won the Moto2 race, despite starting from last place on the grid. It was Márquez's last Moto2 race, as he would replace Stoner at the Honda team for the 2013 season. Polesitter Pol Espargaró secured second in the championship behind Márquez by finishing in eighth. In Moto3, Danny Kent took his second victory of the season in front of champion Sandro Cortese and Zulfahmi Khairuddin to complete an all-KTM podium.

== Report ==
=== Moto2 ===
During a Friday practice session, newly crowned Moto2 champion Marc Márquez knocked Simone Corsi off his bike while attempting an overtake and was penalised for riding in an irresponsible manner by Race Direction. He was told to start the race from 33rd and last place on the grid. Pol Espargaró took pole position, and was joined on the front row by Thomas Lüthi and Takaaki Nakagami.

Within the first three corners of the race, Márquez had overtaken twenty riders and moved up to 13th place; by the end of the first lap, he was running in 11th. Espargaró got away from the line cleanly but struggled to maintain pace in the wet conditions, and quickly began to cede positions. Aspar rider Nicolás Terol took the race lead, and quickly set a gap from the rest of the field. On lap 9 he was caught by Julián Simón, who then stretched out his own gap ahead of Terol. Márquez became embroiled in a midfield battle with Dominique Aegerter and Gino Rea, who crashed out at the halfway point. Márquez began to lap over a second faster than any other rider on track. During the last laps of the race he hunted down first Terol and then Simón, who had seemed on course for his first Moto2 race win. Márquez ultimately claimed his ninth victory of the season by +1.256 seconds on Simón. Third-placed Terol finished over eleven seconds off the pace.

This was Márquez's last race in Moto2, as he moved into MotoGP for the 2013 season. Espargaró secured second in the championship behind Márquez by finishing in eighth. Simón and Terol (who took his first Moto2 podium) completed an all-Spanish podium.

== Classification ==
=== MotoGP ===
Pos.	No.	Rider	Team	Manufacturer	Laps	Time/Retired	Grid	Points
1	26	(Spain) Dani Pedrosa	Repsol Honda Team	Honda	30	48:23.819	1	25
2	21	(Japan) Katsuyuki Nakasuga	Yamaha Factory Racing	Yamaha	30	+37.661	16	20
3	1	(Australia) Casey Stoner	Repsol Honda Team	Honda	30	+1:00.633	3	16
4	19	(Spain) Álvaro Bautista	San Carlo Honda Gresini	Honda	30	+1:02.811	8	13
5	51	(Italy) Michele Pirro	San Carlo Honda Gresini	FTR	30	+1:26.608	15	11
6	4	(Italy) Andrea Dovizioso	Monster Yamaha Tech 3	Yamaha	30	+1:30.423	6	10
7	17	(Czech Republic) Karel Abraham	Cardion AB Motoracing	Ducati	30	+1:31.789	13	9
8	9	(Italy) Danilo Petrucci	Came IodaRacing Project	-Ioda-Suter	29	+1 lap	17	8
9	77	(United Kingdom) James Ellison	Paul Bird Motorsport	ART	29	+1 lap	20	7
10	46	(Italy) Valentino Rossi	Ducati Team	Ducati	29	+1 lap	11	6
11	41	(Spain) Aleix Espargaró	Power Electronics Aspar	ART	29	+1 lap	10	5
12	14	(France) Randy de Puniet	Power Electronics Aspar	ART	28	+2 laps	12	4
13	73	(Japan) Hiroshi Aoyama	Avintia Blusens	BQR	28	+2 laps	21	3
14	5	(United States) Colin Edwards	NGM Mobile Forward Racing	Suter	27	+3 laps	14	2
Ret	35	(United Kingdom) Cal Crutchlow	Monster Yamaha Tech 3	Yamaha	22	Accident	4	
Ret	71	(Italy) Claudio Corti	Avintia Blusens	Inmotec	17	Accident	22	
Ret	8	(Spain) Héctor Barberá	Pramac Racing Team	Ducati	16	Accident	9	
Ret	99	(Spain) Jorge Lorenzo	Yamaha Factory Racing	Yamaha	13	Accident	2	
Ret	6	(Germany) Stefan Bradl	LCR Honda MotoGP	Honda	9	Accident	5	
Ret	84	(Italy) Roberto Rolfo	Speed Master	ART	6	Accident	19	
Ret	22	(Spain) Iván Silva	Avintia Blusens	BQR	2	Accident	18	
Ret	69	(United States) Nicky Hayden	Ducati Team	Ducati	2	Accident	7	

=== Moto2 ===
Pos	No	Rider	Manufacturer	Laps	Time/Retired	Grid	Points
1	93	(Spain) Marc Márquez	Suter	27	48:50.706	33	25
2	60	(Spain) Julián Simón	Suter	27	+1.256	11	20
3	18	(Spain) Nicolás Terol	Suter	27	+11.372	4	16
4	12	(Switzerland) Thomas Lüthi	Suter	27	+13.006	2	13
5	77	(Switzerland) Dominique Aegerter	Suter	27	+13.825	6	11
6	81	(Spain) Jordi Torres	Suter	27	+27.911	5	10
7	36	(Finland) Mika Kallio	Kalex	27	+36.338	15	9
8	40	(Spain) Pol Espargaró	Kalex	27	+38.335	1	8
9	24	(Spain) Toni Elías	Kalex	27	+39.419	14	7
10	80	(Spain) Esteve Rabat	Kalex	27	+39.476	13	6
11	29	(Italy) Andrea Iannone	Speed Up	27	+40.207	9	5
12	8	(United Kingdom) Gino Rea	Suter	27	+41.197	19	4
13	17	(Spain) Dani Rivas	Kalex	27	+41.768	26	3
14	72	(Japan) Yuki Takahashi	FTR	27	+41.943	17	2
15	88	(Spain) Ricard Cardús	AJR	27	+42.303	28	1
16	38	(United Kingdom) Bradley Smith	Tech 3	27	+43.064	21	
17	3	(Italy) Simone Corsi	FTR	27	+49.970	8	
18	75	(Japan) Tomoyoshi Koyama	Suter	27	+51.639	27	
19	4	(Switzerland) Randy Krummenacher	Kalex	27	+53.198	18	
20	49	(Spain) Axel Pons	Kalex	27	+54.632	25	
21	23	(Germany) Marcel Schrötter	Bimota	27	+56.401	24	
22	45	(United Kingdom) Scott Redding	Kalex	27	+56.974	7	
23	22	(Italy) Alessandro Andreozzi	Speed Up	27	+59.679	29	
24	14	(Thailand) Ratthapark Wilairot	Suter	27	+1:16.201	23	
25	54	(Italy) Mattia Pasini	FTR	27	+1:16.352	22	
26	28	(Spain) Román Ramos	FTR	27	+1:18.354	20	
27	19	(Belgium) Xavier Siméon	Tech 3	27	+1:26.234	12	
28	63	(France) Mike Di Meglio	Kalex	27	+1:29.530	16	
29	57	(Brazil) Eric Granado	Motobi	26	+1 lap	31	
30	97	(Indonesia) Rafid Topan Sucipto	Speed Up	25	+2 laps	30	
Ret	82	(Spain) Elena Rosell	Speed Up	17	Accident	32	
Ret	30	(Japan) Takaaki Nakagami	Kalex	14	Retirement	3	
Ret	5	(France) Johann Zarco	Motobi	10	Accident	10	

=== Moto3 ===
Pos	No	Rider	Manufacturer	Laps	Time/Retired	Grid	Points
1	52	(United Kingdom) Danny Kent	KTM	24	45:05.891	7	25
2	11	(Germany) Sandro Cortese	KTM	24	+0.056	4	20
3	63	(Malaysia) Zulfahmi Khairuddin	KTM	24	+0.114	17	16
4	41	(South Africa) Brad Binder	Kalex KTM	24	+0.431	15	13
5	55	(Spain) Héctor Faubel	FTR Honda	24	+4.371	16	11
6	96	(France) Louis Rossi	FTR Honda	24	+7.605	9	10
7	84	(Czech Republic) Jakub Kornfeil	FTR Honda	24	+14.931	14	9
8	25	(Spain) Maverick Viñales	FTR Honda	24	+18.495	5	8
9	31	(Finland) Niklas Ajo	KTM	24	+23.180	22	7
10	39	(Spain) Luis Salom	Kalex KTM	24	+23.245	3	6
11	65	(Germany) Philipp Öttl	Kalex KTM	24	+27.532	26	5
12	58	(Spain) Juan Francisco Guevara	FTR Honda	24	+30.331	21	4
13	27	(Italy) Niccolò Antonelli	FTR Honda	24	+31.255	8	3
14	19	(Italy) Alessandro Tonucci	FTR Honda	24	+34.660	10	2
15	28	(Spain) Josep Rodríguez	FGR Honda	24	+50.522	30	1
16	42	(Spain) Álex Rins	Suter Honda	24	+50.554	18	
17	30	(Switzerland) Giulian Pedone	Suter Honda	24	+51.725	28	
18	5	(Italy) Romano Fenati	FTR Honda	24	+51.826	11	
19	61	(Australia) Arthur Sissis	KTM	24	+52.970	19	
20	32	(Spain) Isaac Viñales	FTR Honda	24	+57.930	23	
21	89	(France) Alan Techer	TSR Honda	24	+1:00.758	24	
22	29	(Germany) Luca Amato	Kalex KTM	24	+1:47.794	20	
23	51	(Japan) Kenta Fujii	TSR Honda	24	+1:47.977	33	
24	80	(Italy) Armando Pontone	Ioda	23	+1 lap	31	
Ret	8	(Australia) Jack Miller	Honda	19	Accident	25	
Ret	9	(Germany) Toni Finsterbusch	Honda	19	Accident	27	
Ret	99	(United Kingdom) Danny Webb	Mahindra	18	Retirement	34	
Ret	44	(Portugal) Miguel Oliveira	Suter Honda	15	Accident	2	
Ret	7	(Spain) Efrén Vázquez	FTR Honda	15	Accident	6	
Ret	95	(Czech Republic) Miroslav Popov	Mahindra	9	Retirement	35	
Ret	17	(United Kingdom) John McPhee	KRP Honda	9	Retirement	29	
Ret	94	(Germany) Jonas Folger	Kalex KTM	7	Retirement	1	
Ret	26	(Spain) Adrián Martín	FTR Honda	7	Retirement	13	
Ret	3	(Italy) Luigi Morciano	Ioda	4	Retirement	32	
Ret	12	(Spain) Álex Márquez	Suter Honda	3	Accident	12	

== Notes ==
Marc Márquez's comeback from 33rd to the win was the biggest comeback in all of the history in the Championship.

Dani Pedrosa, who made the pole position in MotoGP, started the race from the pit lane because he entered to the boxes for a bike change because the tarmac was drying, like Alvaro Bautista, Nicky Hayden and Cal Crutchlow. The Spanish rider, despite this, won the race after Jorge Lorenzo crashed heavily when the Yamaha rider tried to lap James Ellison.

== Championship standings after the race (MotoGP) ==
Below are the standings for the top five riders and constructors after round eighteen has concluded.

Riders' Championship standings

Pos.	Rider	Points
1	(Spain) Jorge Lorenzo	350
2	(Spain) Dani Pedrosa	332
3	(Australia) Casey Stoner	254
4	(Italy) Andrea Dovizioso	218
5	(Spain) Álvaro Bautista	178

Constructors' Championship standings

Pos.	Constructor	Points
1	(Japan) Honda	412
2	(Japan) Yamaha	386
3	(Italy) Ducati	192
4	(Italy) ART	100
5	(United Kingdom) FTR	43

- Note: Only the top five positions are included for both sets of standings.

Previous race: 2012 Australian Grand Prix	FIM Grand Prix World Championship; 2012 season	Next race: 2013 Qatar Grand Prix
Previous race: 2011 Valencian Grand Prix	Valencian Community motorcycle Grand Prix	Next race: 2013 Valencian Grand Prix
