= 2015 Malaysian motorcycle Grand Prix =

Sporting event

(Malaysia) 2015 Malaysian Grand Prix
Race details
- Race 17 of 18 races in the 2015 Grand Prix motorcycle racing season
- Date: 25 October 2015
- Official name: Shell Malaysia Motorcycle Grand Prix
- Location: Sepang International Circuit
- Course: Permanent racing facility; 5.543 km (3.444 mi)

MotoGP
Pole position
Rider	(Spain) Dani Pedrosa	Honda
Time	1:59.053	
Fastest lap
Rider	(Spain) Jorge Lorenzo	Yamaha
Time	2:00.606 on lap 2	
Podium
First	(Spain) Dani Pedrosa	Honda
Second	(Spain) Jorge Lorenzo	Yamaha
Third	(Italy) Valentino Rossi	Yamaha

Moto2
Pole position
Rider	(Switzerland) Thomas Lüthi	Kalex
Time	2:06.383	
Fastest lap
Rider	(Switzerland) Thomas Lüthi	Kalex
Time	2:07.321 on lap 2	
Podium
First	(France) Johann Zarco	Kalex
Second	(Switzerland) Thomas Lüthi	Kalex
Third	(Germany) Jonas Folger	Kalex

Moto3
Pole position
Rider	(Italy) Niccolò Antonelli	Honda
Time	2:12.653	
Fastest lap
Rider	(South Africa) Brad Binder	KTM
Time	2:13.571 on lap 3	
Podium
First	(Portugal) Miguel Oliveira	KTM
Second	(South Africa) Brad Binder	KTM
Third	(Spain) Jorge Navarro	Honda

The 2015 Malaysian motorcycle Grand Prix (formally the Shell Malaysia Motorcycle Grand Prix) was the seventeenth (and penultimate round) of eighteen motorcycle races of the 2015 MotoGP season. It was held before a crowd of 88,832 people at the Sepang International Circuit in the Malaysian district of Sepang in Selangor on 25 October 2015. Dani Pedrosa of Honda won the 20-lap race from pole position. Yamaha rider Jorge Lorenzo finished second and his teammate Valentino Rossi came in third. In the junior classes, Johann Zarco won the Moto2 race on a Kalex bike and KTM's Miguel Oliveira won in Moto3.

Pedrosa won the pole position by recording the fastest lap in qualifying and maintained his start line advantage going into the first corner. The race was, however, overshadowed by the three-lap duel for third place between Honda rider Marc Márquez and his rival Rossi as the two traded position several times per lap. The tension between the two was high when Márquez and Rossi duelled each other in Argentina and the Netherlands and Rossi accused Márquez of helping teammate Lorenzo in Australia which both riders denied. The duel ended with Márquez and Rossi colliding at turn fourteen on lap seven. Although Rossi continued, Márquez fell from his bike and retired in the pit lane after remounting his bike. Pedrosa meanwhile led every lap to take his second victory of the season, his 28th in MotoGP and the 51st of his career by almost four seconds over Lorenzo. Rossi was issued three penalty points and was required to start from the rear of the grid at the season-ending Valencian Community Grand Prix since he had another penalty point from earlier in the season and he withdrew a subsequent appeal with the Court of Arbitration for Sport in December 2015.

In the junior classes, Thomas Lüthi started from pole position in Moto2 with a new class lap record. Lüthi and Zarco traded places on the first lap and then both riders were able to establish a small advantage at the front of the field. Zarco began closing up to Lüthi with seven laps left but Lüthi responded by seeing a pit board message that encouraged him to increase his pace. Zarco however conserved the life of his tyres in the closing stages of the race and passed Lüthi at turn two on the final lap to win for the eighth time in the season. Niccolò Antonelli began the Moto3 race from pole position but got involved in a multi-rider duel which had the lead swapped hands in almost every lap of the round. In the end, Miguel Oliveira ended up drafting his teammate Brad Binder on the back straight and overtook him at the final corner. Oliviera fended Binder off to win his fifth race of the season. Danny Kent had the possibility to win the Riders' Championship at Sepang if he came fifth regardless where Oliviera came but was unable to do so when he took seventh.

The consequence of the race meant Lorenzo was now trailing Rossi by seven points in the Riders' Championship and Márquez retained third place despite his retirement. Pedrosa's victory allowed him to move into fourth after Andrea Iannone retired from a punctured radiator on the second lap of the race. In the Teams' Championship, Yamaha increased their unassailable lead to 200 points over Honda and Ducati retained third despite both their riders not reaching the end of the event. Tech 3 and Suzuki completed the top five. Yamaha still led the Constructors' Championship on 382 points; Honda and Ducati were second and third with one round left in the season.

== Report ==
=== Background ===
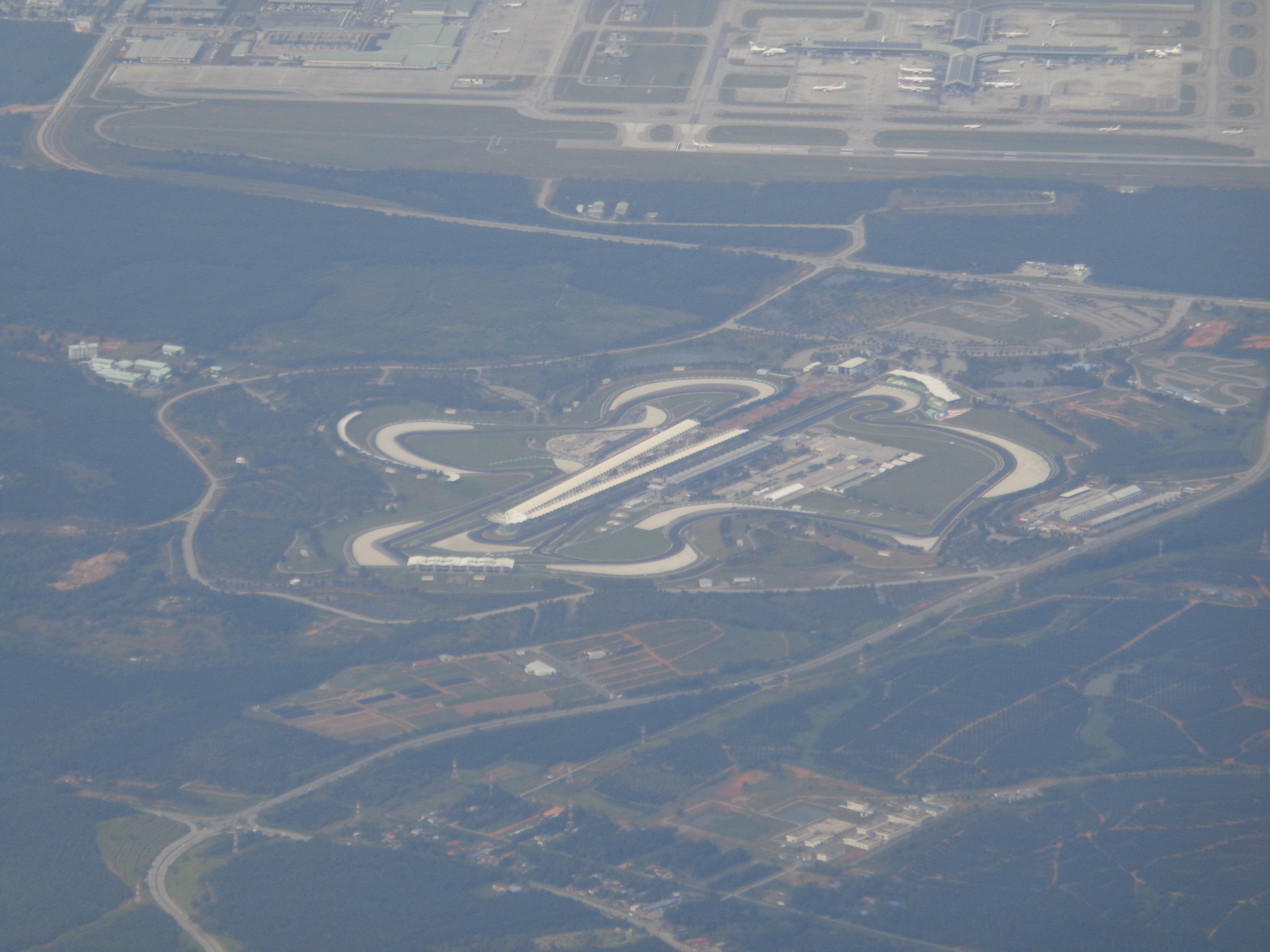
An aerial photograph of the Sepang International Circuit in 2016.

The 2015 Malaysian motorcycle Grand Prix was announced as part of MotoGP's 2015 schedule by the world governing body of motorcycle racing, the Fédération Internationale de Motocyclisme (FIM) in September 2014. It was the twenty-fifth consecutive Grand Prix to be held in Malaysia and the sixteenth straight race at the fifteen-turn 5.543 km (3.444 mi) Sepang International Circuit. The Grand Prix was the seventeenth scheduled round of the 2015 MotoGP season by FIM and was held on 25 October after two preceding days of practice and qualifying. With forest fires continuing to burn in neighboring Indonesia, heavy smog was a concern for the race. Unhealthy levels affected the Formula One Singapore Grand Prix two months earlier and Sepang International Circuit managing director Razlan Razali negotiated with MotoGP's promoter Dorna Sports and the International Road Racing Teams Association about shortening the meeting if required. It was later confirmed that the event would proceed without any restrictions due to the championship situation, and monitoring equipment was installed at the circuit to measure the local air quality.

Coming into the race from Australia one week earlier, Yamaha rider Valentino Rossi was leading the Riders' Championship with 296 points and his nearest championship rival was teammate Jorge Lorenzo was a further eleven points behind in second. Repsol Honda's Marc Márquez placed third with 222 points and Andrea Iannone of Ducati followed in fourth with 188 points. Dani Pedrosa, the second Honda factory rider, rounded out the top five with 165 points. In the Teams' Championship, Yamaha MotoGP topped the standings with 581 points. Repsol Honda (392 points) and Ducati (341) were closer to each other in the battle for second while Tech 3 and Suzuki MotoGP completed the top five with 254 and 172 points respectively. Yamaha led the Constructors' Championship with 362 points: Honda, Ducati, Suzuki and Yamaha Forward followed in the next four placings with a respective 310, 237, 120 and 33 points accrued. 50 points were available for the final two rounds of the season which meant Rossi could win his eighth MotoGP championship in Sepang. Rossi needed to score fifteen more points than Lorenzo if the latter finished sixth or lower.

The tension was high between Rossi and Márquez going into the weekend because the duo had engaged in a battle at the Argentine Grand Prix that left Márquez crashing out of the race after colliding with the rear of Rossi's bike and the Dutch TT later that year when the pair got involved in a duel for the win that ended in Rossi's favour despite a collision with Márquez at the track's final chicane on the final lap of the event. In the pre-race press conference, Rossi accused Márquez of aiding his championship rival Lorenzo in Australia which both riders denied. Rossi continued and stated his belief Márquez was not a fan of his when growing up, a comment that angered Márquez. Meanwhile, Pedrosa aimed to return to the podium after stating his happiness over his fifth-place finish at the Australian Grand Prix and wanted to give himself the best opportunity of securing a strong result and noted the physical and mental demands placed on the rider due to Malaysia's warm climate.

=== Practice and qualifying ===
Four practice sessions – two for both Friday and Saturday – were held before the race on Sunday. The first two on Friday ran for 45 minutes each with a third identically timed practice session held on Saturday morning. The final session on Saturday afternoon lasted half an hour. Pedrosa set the fastest time of the first practice session in hot weather conditions early on with a two minutes and 00.412 seconds lap. Lorenzo followed two-seconds of a second adrift in second and Márquez followed in third. The rest of the top ten was completed by Rossi, Scott Redding, Cal Crutchlow, Iannone, Héctor Barberá, Aleix Espargaró and Andrea Dovizioso. The track had a large amount of dust but had just two riders crash in the final twelve minutes: Crutchlow went off at turn five while Alvaro Bautista fell off his bike at the turn fifteen hairpin; both incidents occurred concurrently and the duo returned to the pit lane to mount onto their spare bikes. In the second practice session, Lorenzo recorded the fastest lap of the day at two minutes and 00.246 seconds with four minutes remaining. His fellow Spaniards Pedrosa and Márquez were second and third. Iannone, Crutchlow, Aleix Espargaró, Dovizioso, Danilo Petrucci and Redding followed in the top ten. The sole incident of second practice happened seven minutes in when Iannone crashed at turn eight.

Hazy weather conditions continued to affect Sepang heading into the third practice session which had Lorenzo improve on his previous best time from the day prior to record the fastest lap of the weekend so far late in practice at one minute and 59.544 seconds with Márquez following 0.142 seconds behind in second. Pedrosa was third-fastest, Rossi placed fourth and Barberá fifth. Crutchlow, Aleix Espargaró, Dovizioso, Pol Espargaró and Maverick Viñales occupied positions six through ten. Late in the session, Petrucci lost control of the front of his bike and crashed out at turn seven. Petrucci was unhurt. Pedrosa topped the time sheets in the fourth practice session with a lap time of two minutes and 00.471 seconds. Márquez was 0.322 seconds slower in second place and Iannone was running stronger and set the third-fastest lap. Lorenzo was fourth-quickest; Rossi was fifth and Dovizioso sixth. Aleix Espargaró placed seventh, his brother Pol Espargaró was eighth, Redding ninth and Bradley Smith completed the top ten ahead of qualifying. The sole incident of the session occurred halfway through when the front of Lorenzo's bike got loose and slid into the gravel trap at the final corner.

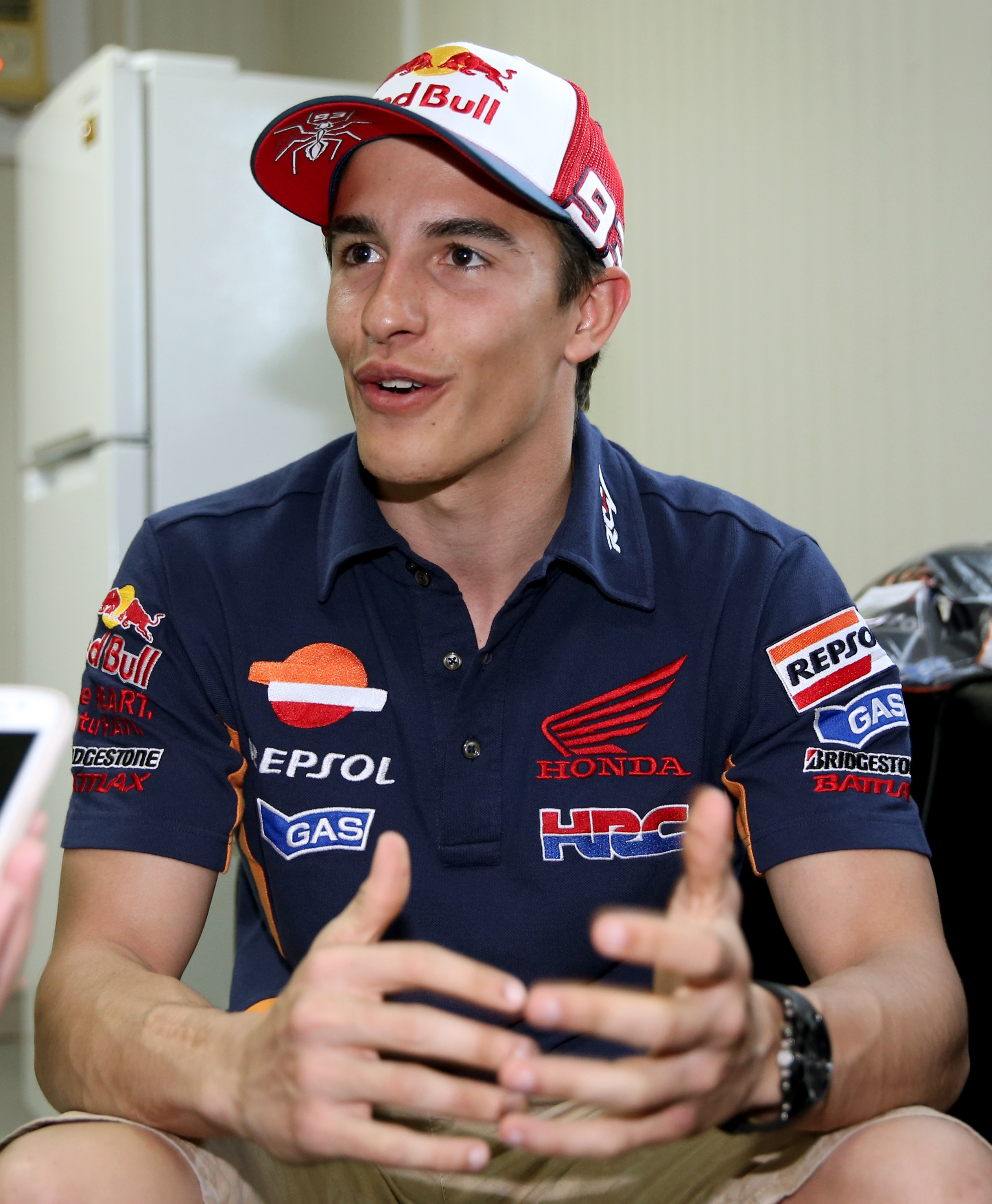
Marc Márquez qualified on the front row of the grid in second place during qualifying.

Saturday afternoon's qualifying session was divided into two parts. The two sessions lasted 15 minutes and had the slowest riders in the first three practice sessions compete in the first part with the second session composing the top ten quickest participants from the opening trio of practice sessions. The first session had the fastest two competitors progress into the second session which determined pole position through to twelfth. While most riders opted for three timed runs, Pedrosa chose to perform two and ventured onto the track later so he would not be impeded by traffic. This enabled Pedrosa to clinch his first pole position of the season, his first since the 2014 Catalan Grand Prix, and broke Márquez's lap record of the Sepang International Circuit from the previous year with a time of one minute and 59.053 seconds. He was joined on the front row of the grid by Márquez whose fastest lap was four-tenths of a second off Pedrosa's pace and avoided crashing on his second run after making a rider error. Rossi joined the duo in third but was initially a second slower despite slipstreaming Iannone but achieved his fastest time without drafting anyone on his final attempt. Lorenzo was fourth after believing he had qualified in the top three and was observed riding towards parc fermé but was redirected to his garage. Crutchlow secured fifth place in the closing minutes and demoted Iannone to sixth who had steering issues with his bike while Dovizioso took seventh. Viñales and Smith progressed into the second qualifying session, placing eighth and ninth and Barberá rounded out the top ten with his time matched by Aleix Espargaró who crashed in qualifying's closing seconds. Pol Espargaró was the slowest rider of the twelve that competed in the first qualifying session.

Petrucci was the fastest driver not to progress beyond the first qualifying session; his fastest time of two minutes and 1.346 seconds was almost 2.3 seconds off Pedrosa's pace Stefan Bradl was 14th and he attributed this to a minor rider error at the final corner. Redding struggled to locate the feel for his bike and lost some time on the two long straights for unknown reasons, restricting him to 15th. 16th-place qualifier Jack Miller's bike caught fire and was thrown from it hike as the machine flipped over and rested in the turn seven gravel trap. Miller was unhurt. Bautista took 17th place as he struggled with the grip of his bike while rider errors meant Yonny Hernández started the race from 18th position. Nicky Hayden slipstreamed up behind another bike but this did not significantly aid him enough to improve his best effort and took 19th while 20th-placed Loris Baz struggled with getting the correct amount of grip from his tyres and this meant he could not push any harder than he could. Similarly, his teammate Toni Elías secured 21st after he was unable to find the grip within his tyres on his first laps. Eugene Laverty was 22nd and Mike Di Meglio had issues with his front tyre that prevented him from pushing more aggressively and placed 23rd. Australians Anthony West and Damian Cudlin occupied the final positions on the grid in 24th and 25th.

=== Warm-up ===
The riders took to the track in hot ambient and track temperatures at 09:40 Malaysian Standard Time (UTC–08:00) for a twenty-minute warm-up session. Márquez continued his quick pace by setting the fastest lap of the session of two minutes and 00.186 seconds. He was 0.319 seconds quicker than Lorenzo in second. Rossi placed third with Pedrosa and Iannone fourth and fifth. Aleix Espargaró, Viñales, Crutchlow, Pol Espargaró and Dovizioso completed the top ten fastest riders. Barberá clashed with the front wheel on Pol Espargaró's bike at turn one and both riders fell. Di Meglio crashed at turn five and could not get back to the pit lane despite escaping with no injuries. Miller crashed at turn nine with two minutes left and his session was ended prematurely. After warm-up, race direction issued one penalty point to Barberá for his clash with Pol Espargaró. Barberá thus accumulated his fourth penalty point of the season, and he was ordered to start at the back of the grid.

=== Race ===
The race began before a crowd of 88,832 people at 14:00 local time. Weather conditions at the start of the race were dry and cloudy. The air temperature was 35 °C (95 °F) and the track temperature was 47 °C (117 °F); a 30% probability of rain was forecast. The Honda factory duo of Pedrosa and Márquez maintained the first two positions heading into the first corner with Rossi third. Lorenzo made a poor getaway and was overtaken by the Ducatis of Dovizioso and Iannone but returned to fourth place after passing both riders at turn four. Rossi used the slipstream of the factory Hondas to keep in the lead group but his teammate Lorenzo was close by. Before the first lap ended, Cudlin lost control of the rear of his bike coming onto the back straight and crashed out of the Grand Prix. Lorenzo out-braked teammate Rossi on the outside line into turn one to move into third at the start of the second lap. Lorenzo then prevented Rossi from retaking third by staying on the racing line and this caused Rossi to slow so he would avoid glancing Lorenzo's bike. Further down the order, Bradl was passed by Crutchlow for seventh position. Baz became the second retiree of the race when he crashed on the start of the same lap at turn one.

Soon after, Iannone retired in the pit lane with a damaged radiator which was caused by another rider kicking up a stone with one of his tyres at the start of the race and it punctured a hole in the bike component. Due to his crash in the warm-up session, Pol Espargaró was riding in severe pain with a fractured vertebrae and felt dizzy during certain points in the race which left him vulnerable to being overtaken by other riders. This was evident when Crutchlow and Smith moved past him for sixth and seventh on the second and third laps. Márquez was struggling to control the front of his bike and was losing ground to teammate Pedrosa and Lorenzo was closing up to him. Approaching turn four on lap three, Márquez made a mistake under braking and he skimmed along the edge of the rumble strips but managed to avoid running onto grass. This enabled Lorenzo to overtake Márquez for second place and went about trying to reduce Pedrosa's advantage at the front of the field. That same lap, Elías lost two positions when Barberá and Laverty got past him. Rossi observed Márquez's error at turn four and was close behind him entering the final corner but could not effect a successful overtaking manoeuvre.

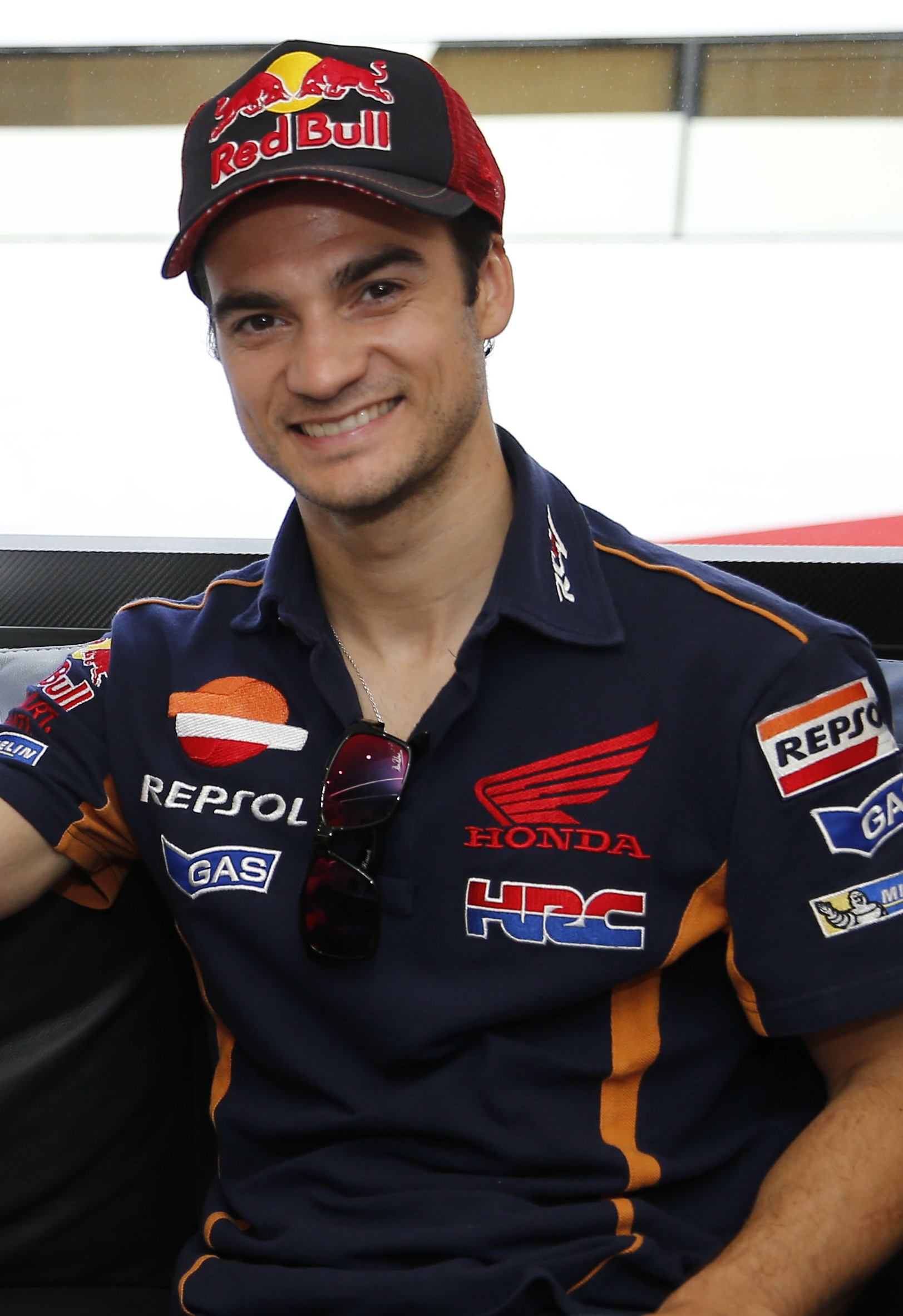
Dani Pedrosa (pictured in 2016) started from pole position and led every lap of the race to claim his second victory of the season, his 28th in MotoGP and the 51st of his career.

Márquez went off the racing line into turn four and Rossi overtook him for third on lap four with the latter unable to respond. Márquez then planned his counter-attack but continued to have problems with controlling the rear of his bike. Márquez began a duel that lasted three laps as he tried to retake third from Rossi at turn fifteen but went wide. At turn one at the start of lap five, Márquez did get past Rossi under braking but again ran wide which allowed Rossi to reclaim third. Márquez made a third passing try on Rossi entering turn four but the latter got back through when the former drifted wide. Márquez got through at turn five but lost third four corners later with the position changing hands at each corner. Márquez ended up holding third over Rossi on the back straight and the two riders overtook each other a total of ten times on lap five. Rossi's foot slipped three times off his footpeg but was able to regain control of his bike each time and avoid crashing. Rossi barged Márquez at turn seven on lap six but Márquez out-braked Rossi at turn fourteen later in the lap. Rossi grew increasingly frustrated with the battle for third and turned backwards to gesticulate to Márquez which was interpreted as a signal that the pair should stop duelling and slipstream one another to get back to Pedrosa and Lorenzo who were pulling away.

After some close passes through the section of the track entering turn nine on lap seven, Rossi was on the inside line through the turn thirteen long-right hander with Márquez to his left. Rossi appeared to slow deliberately and push Márquez ever wider as they went into turn fourteen. This caused Rossi to adopt a jerky motion which had him adjust his bike's turning movements and position. Márquez was pushed off the racing line as he was pushed more wider by Rossi as he leaned in and the latter moved out after Rossi looked directly at Márquez. Doing this caused Márquez and Rossi to collide; Márquez's helmet hit Rossi's kneeslider, knocking his leg out of position, and subsequently contacted his handlebars. Márquez spun and fell from his bike as he crashed lowside but remounted. Márquez then rode into the pit lane and retired from the Grand Prix. Race direction announced on lap nine that the clash between Márquez and Rossi would be investigated after the race.

On the eleventh lap, Crutchlow (despite a brake lever problem) was battling Dovizioso for fourth position at turns five and six when the two made contact during the change of direction. Dovizioso fell from his bike and retired but accepted an apology from Crutchlow after the race. Crutchlow later ran wide at the final corner on lap twelve, allowing Smith to overtake him for fourth place. On lap thirteen, Hayden was passed by Elías for fifteenth place and Petrucci overtook Aleix Espargaró for seventh position three laps later. Bautista fell to thirteenth on the same lap when Hernández and Barberá moved past him while Miller overtook Hayden to move into sixteenth but Hayden reclaimed the place on the final lap. Pedrosa opened his advantage at the front of the field to 3.6 seconds over Lorenzo and crossed the start/finish line after twenty laps to claim his second victory of the season, his 28th in MotoGP and the 51st of his career. Rossi was third and Smith and Crutchlow were fourth and fifth. Petrucci, Aleix Espargaró, Viñales, Pol Espargaró, Bradl, Redding, Hernández, Barberá, Elías, Bautista, Hayden, Miller, Di Meglio, Laverty and West were the last of the classified finishers.

=== Post-race ===
On the post-race podium, Lorenzo was booed by the crowd as he collected his second-place trophy and his teammate Rossi declined to speak to the media in the later press conference. Lorenzo then proceeded to leave the podium and later explained to the press that this was not because of the booing but due to him suffering from exhaustion from the high ambient temperatures and humidity that is often dealt with in Malaysia. Two weeks later at the season-ending Valencian Community Grand Prix, Lorenzo apologised for appearing to make a thumbs down gesture at teammate Rossi on the podium, "I regret that. It's not a sporting example, especially for young people watching MotoGP around the world." Pedrosa spoke about his happiness over taking his second victory of the season and stated that he set-up his bike similar to that of the pre-season test session at Sepang in February, "We had a good feeling from Friday, we were able to manage the weekend well and above all we had a bike that worked very well during every practice.", and, "I am especially pleased to finish the season very positively, as it has been a hard year but we are now recovering well and we're in good form."

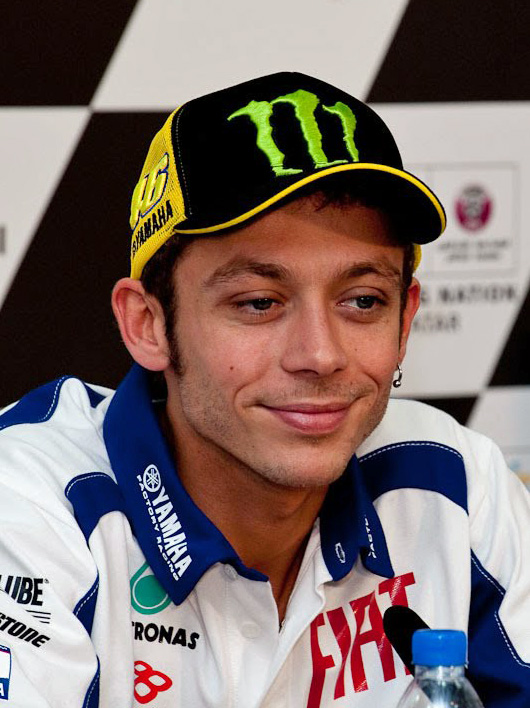
Valentino Rossi (pictured in 2010) was handed three penalty points on his race licence for his collision with Marc Márquez and lost a subsequent appeal with the Court of Arbitration for Sport which he withdrew in December 2015.

The collision between Rossi and Márquez at turn fourteen on lap seven overshadowed the race. Márquez expressed his shock over what had happened and that he did not foresee it happening and was annoyed at being caught up in the crash. He stated his belief that Rossi had violated MotoGP regulations, "For me it doesn't matter if you are Valentino or another rider, [in] this type of incident you are out of control. To take a leg off and push another rider out, it is difficult think like this on the bike." Rossi defended his actions, arguing that the collision was not done with malice and protested his innocence. He said that he did not regret the comments he made about Márquez and had lost all respect for Márquez and teammate Lorenzo due to the incident. Rossi also theorised that Marquez was still resentful from the incidents at the Argentine Grand Prix and the Dutch TT and that he was seeking revenge from what had happened, "He decided the championship and he made me lose the championship. I think that he will be very happy."

Race direction requested Rossi and Márquez to visit the stewards after the race where they provided testimony and video evidence was reviewed. Both riders exchanged words in a heated confrontation with nothing of what was said disclosed to the media. The stewards deemed Rossi to have "deliberately ran wide on Turn 14 in order to force another rider off line, resulting in contact causing the other rider to crash" and issued him three penalty points for transgressing Article 1.21.2 of the FIM Road Racing World Championship Grand Prix Regulations and was ordered to start at the back of the grid for the Valencian Community Grand Prix because he already had another penalty point from earlier in the season. After Yamaha had their appeal rejected by the FIM, Rossi lodged one with the Court of Arbitration for Sport (CAS) on 30 October and sought either the annulment or reduction of the penalty and it was suspended until the CAS heard his case. Lawyers acting on Lorenzo's behalf filed a Request for Intervention three days later so they could act on his behalf but the CAS told them of their rejection of this move. On 4 November, a preliminary hearing was held at the CAS headquarters in Lausanne and an order undertaken by CAS arbitrator Ulrich Haas dismissing the stay filed by Rossi meant his penalty stood. Rossi told the CAS that he was withdrawing the appeal on 10 December and the case was subsequently closed.

The result of the race meant Lorenzo reduced Rossi's advantage at the top of the Riders' Championship to seven points. Despite failing to finish the race, Márquez maintained third position with 222 points and his teammate Pedrosa moved past the non-finishing Iannone for fourth because of his victory. Yamaha MotoGP increased their unassailable lead at the top of the Teams' Championship to 200 points over Repsol Honda. With Ducati unable to finish the Grand Prix, they fell further back from Repsol Honda with 341 points but still retained third position. Tech 3 and Suzuki MotoGP kept fourth and fifth with a respective 274 and 189 points. Yamaha continued to lead the Constructors' Championship but their advantage over Honda had been lowered to 47 points. Ducati, Suzuki and Yamaha Forward completed the top five with round of the season left.

== Reaction to the Rossi–Márquez collision ==
Both Rossi and Márquez were criticized for their actions with former MotoGP riders Ben Spies, Jeremy McWilliams and retired World Superbike champion Troy Bayliss expressing their displeasure with the incident and that both riders were to blame. Double MotoGP World Champion Casey Stoner and retired World Superbike Champion Carl Fogarty were critical of Rossi's move and the penalty that was given, with both claiming that had any rider other than Rossi done the same thing, they would have been disqualified immediately. Lorenzo also criticized the move by his teammate Rossi and said the penalty given to him afterwards was a case of receiving preferable treatment as the sport's biggest rider, "If another rider did what Valentino did today, he would do minimum a ride through, minimum a black flag, minimum a race of penalization. But it didn't happen, and I'm disappointed, very disappointed." However, Franco Uncini, MotoGP's safety director, played down suggestions that Rossi's status had been influential in deciding the penalty and stated the severity of the incident called for a retrospective review rather than an imminent decision."

Pedrosa was critical of Rossi's response to the collision and stated, "Valentino [is always] saying, well, this is racing, and racing is like this, and we should fight, and now he is changing his comment. A little bit of [a] contradiction at this moment of what he said then, and what he is saying now." Fifteen-time World Champion Giacomo Agostini told Italian sports newspaper La Gazzetta dello Sport that Rossi had fallen into Márquez's trap which led him to believe he was the more intelligent rider and that the reaction given to him by Márquez during the race was an expected one, "I'm convinced that Valentino was angry, exhausted and frustrated, but until that turn it had been a great fight. But Valentino was surprised. He is a great professional." Michael Laverty criticised Márquez on Twitter, "Marc [Marquez] broke the unwritten rule, always respect those fighting for a championship when you're not" with Colin Edwards expressing a similar statement.

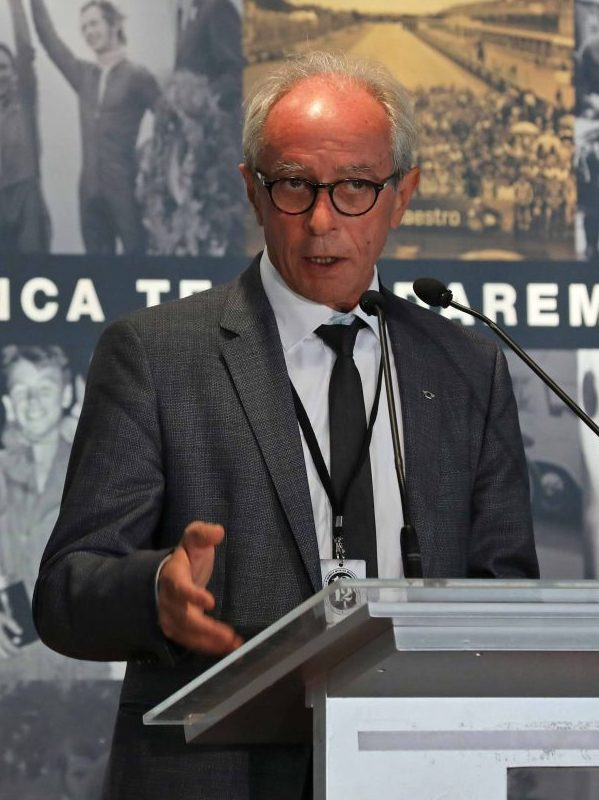
FIM president Vito Ippolito (pictured in 2017) wrote an open letter to the MotoGP community that said the Rossi-Márquez collision had "poisoned the atmosphere around the sport"

The FIM president Vito Ippolito wrote an open letter to the MotoGP community, saying the events had "a damaging effect on the staging of our competitions and poisoned the atmosphere around the sport", and, "We are moving away from the tradition of pride in sportsmanship that is part of the heritage of motorcycling." Thirteen-time champion Ángel Nieto wrote to Rossi and Márquez and called for both riders to resume "the harmony and the respect that has characterised throughout your successful career, in which you were an idol for one another. Respect is something that you should never lose and It should be an example for the millions of fans who love the sport." Carmelo Ezpeleta, the CEO of Dorna Sports, privately met with Lorenzo, Rossi and Márquez and later told the press at Valencia that Ippolito believed mistakes had been made and cooperation with the MotoGP community was needed to correct them, "We've done a lot of self-analysis and few people know the situation better than us. I've never had any qualms about accepting that when things go wrong, our mission is to try to see what we can do to improve things in the future.

Reactions from the Formula One community were mixed. Four-time World Champion Sebastian Vettel spoke of his belief that Rossi had committed no infraction and 2008 runner-up Felipe Massa apportioned blame onto Rossi whom he felt made a mistake. Figures from the political world also had their say with Spanish Prime Minister Mariano Rajoy tweeting, "In sport as in politics, not everything is permissible", and the Prime Minister of Italy Matteo Renzi telephoned Rossi to offer his support. Members of the media also came under scrutiny by creating allegations that Lorenzo stormed into the Race Direction hearing and pleaded that Rossi be disqualified and "launched into a tirade". Lorenzo then wrote on Twitter and debunked the allegations by stating he was at the press conference with Pedrosa and that the alleged tirade could have never existed. The members of the media that posted the articles later retracted and deleted their statements. Journalists from the Italian media also came under significant criticism after being found to have trespassed onto Márquez's home property in Barcelona, which included physical attacks and abuse on both Márquez and his family, resulting in a legal complaint being filed by Márquez, as well as a police investigation. The incident in Barcelona, along with an ongoing protest to eradicate Rossi's penalty, forced Ezpeleta to cancel the pre-race press conference in Valencia to address any ongoing concerns the riders, teams and constructors throughout the entire paddock felt hadn't been addressed, while ensuring the safety of the three main riders caught up in the controversy.

The Spanish press were critical of Rossi's actions and fans on social media compared it to those committed by Italian defender Mauro Tassotti who elbowed Luis Enrique during the quarter-finals of the 1994 FIFA World Cup and the kick to the chest committed by defensive midfielder Nigel de Jong on central midfielder Xabi Alonso in the 2010 FIFA World Cup Final. Journalist Mat Oxley summarised the controversy in a self-penned article for Motor Sport,

Many people believe that [Rossi's] actions were justified because of Marquez's onslaught, just as many believe Zinedine Zidane was justified in head-butting an opponent in the 2006 World Cup Final, or that David Beckham was justified in kicking another player in the 1998 World Cup. But you can't do that."

== Aftermath of the incident ==
The aftermath of the incident left a lingering effect on the sport, particularly Lorenzo and Márquez who were given extra security during the Italian and San Marino rounds of the 2016 season after an increasing amount of serious threats towards them by Rossi's fan base. Both men continuously received a chorus of boos from Rossi's fan base whenever they were seen on track and television screens throughout the entirety of the season. Márquez notably used the hostile reaction from the fans as fuel to continue to compete, winning the next four championships after the 2015 season, with another clash with Rossi during the qualifying session for the 2019 San Marino Grand Prix and would go onto win the race, Márquez publicly stating his motivation was based on the incident during qualifying. Prior to the 2020 season, then team-principal Livio Suppo reflected on the incident and the impact it had on both Márquez and sport itself, "There was a big confusion among some of Valentino's friends, they came into the garage shouting and were really aggressive with Marc [...], it was an unforgettable weekend. The biggest thing about Marc is his character, he's always positive, always smiling; Valentino is such a big hero that it has bought some hooligans to the sport, while growing fans is good for the sport it has consequences, it comes with a lot of people who don't understand the rules. Marc was able to manage the situation and come back stronger." Journalist Suzi Perry praising Marquez's calm demeanour throughout, "It's incredible to think Marc kept a level head during that time, because he was so young. When he came to Valencia you didn't see any differences in his character at all." Despite this, Marquez and Rossi have never resumed their friendship, which was confirmed by Rossi in 2021, although according to Lorenzo the estrangement between them began during their incident in Argentina, not during the Malaysian press conference.

During Lorenzo's championship victory in the 2015 season, Yamaha's celebrations were quiet in comparison to previous years, which prompted the Mission Winnow Ducati Team to sign him on a 2-year deal for the 2017 and 2018 seasons, ending a 9-year partnership between himself and the Movistar Yamaha Factory Team, a split that heavily affected both sides. Movistar Yamaha signed Maverick Viñales to fill Lorenzo's seat and resigned Rossi whilst their results began to decline, the factory Yamaha team have only won four races in three years since Rossi's final career victory at the 2017 Dutch TT - with all wins courtesy of Viñales, who himself being ousted from the team midway through 2021 after a further win - and have finished third in the teams championship between 2017 and 2019 behind Repsol Honda and Mission Winnow Ducati. While the Yamaha M1 continued to sustain problems and was unable to keep up with the horsepower the Ducati Desmosedici and the Honda RC213V, with most victories in the 2018 and 2019 seasons coming on either a Ducati or a Honda, and either of the two won the constructors' championship from 2016 onwards.

After joining Ducati, Lorenzo had a lacklustre 2017 season, with injuries, despite three victories in 2018 at Italy, Barcelona and Austria, a crash in Thailand ended his season five rounds early. Lorenzo would sign with Repsol Honda in 2019 and announce his retirement the same year in Valencia after losing motivation to compete in the field, as well as the continuous injuries sustained and last three seasons left him with a decreasing ability to be competitive with the rest of the field. Lorenzo would return to Yamaha as their test rider from the 2020 season, four years after leaving the company, before being replaced by Cal Crutchlow for 2021. When speaking to British broadcaster BT Sport in May 2020, Lorenzo remarked the heartbreak of feeling his title was not a deserved victory by some MotoGP fans, stating that he achieved the most victories, pole positions and fastest laps throughout the season, "me and my team, we were in our own little world, our own bubble, we know the value of that championship and I think we were the worthy champions".

Rossi's legacy has been impacted since the incident, with many questions about where the "Spanish conspiracy" had emerged from, whether it was a psychological tactic that went awry, if friends from his personal circle had fuelled the idea or if he had simply crumbled under the pressure of an eighth world title; although his personal records continue to maintain a positive impact. After the Valencian race when he lost the championship to teammate Lorenzo, Rossi told reporters he felt that making the comments during the Malaysian press conference and the decision to attack Márquez during the race were mistakes, although he refused to apologise for it and has not addressed the incident publicly since.

== Moto2 ==
Entering the Moto2 race, Petronas AHM Malaysia announced that they would field Ramdan Rosli as a wild card rider, the third time he raced under this method in Grand Prix motorcycle racing. Tito Rabat missed the race as he was recovering from a broken radius in his left arm. Thomas Lüthi was in the top three in all trio of practice sessions and carried his strong form into qualifying where he took his eighth career pole position with a time of two minutes and 6.383 seconds and no one could better his effort because of rain. Lüthi's time eclipsed Pol Espargaro's class lap record of the Sepang International Circuit in 2012. Moto2 champion Johann Zarco joined Lüthi on the front row of the grid and Álex Rins started alongside the two in third. Lüthi held the lead going into the first corner. Although he lost the position to Zarco at turn four, Lüthi retook it at the final turn. Lüthi then tried to create a small advantage at the front of the field with Zarco close by. Both riders successfully opened up a healthy lead at the front of the pack and Lüthi's advantage over Zarco was up to one second by the start of lap eleven. With seven laps to go, Zarco lowered Lüthi's lead to half a second but it returned to one second three laps later when Lüthi received a message on his pit board encouraging him to increase his pace.

Zarco conserved the life of his tyres and began reducing Lüthi's lead in preparation for a final attack on him for the victory with three laps remaining. The lead was down to two-tenths of a second at the start of the final lap and Zarco took first from Lüthi at turn two. Zarco then fended off a comeback from Lüthi and held the lead for the rest of the race to secure the tenth victory of his career by half a second and he equalled Rabat and Márquez's joint record of the number of Moto2 podiums scored in one season with his fourteenth of 2015. Jonas Folger was battling Rins for third until the latter crashed at turn nine on lap ten and was untroubled thereafter. Takaaki Nakagami was a distant fourth and overtook Lorenzo Baldassarri in the closing laps of the race to demote him to fifth. Luis Salom found some pace around the same period of the event to claim sixth. The top ten was completed by Sandro Cortese, Hafizh Syahrin, Simone Corsi and Xavier Siméon. Axel Pons came eleventh after coming close to passing Siméon on the final lap with Mika Kallio twelfth. Thirteenth-placed and Sam Lowes struggled with grip in the race's closing stages which lost him five seconds per lap, and Ricard Cardús and Franco Morbidelli were the final two points scorers. Álex Márquez and Marcel Schrötter were the other retirements of the race due to separate crashes within the first nine laps.

== Moto3 ==
Going into the weekend in Moto3, Danny Kent needed to finish in the top five regardless of where his championship rival Miguel Oliviera came or finish ahead of the latter in order to clinch the Riders' Championship and become the first British rider to do since Barry Sheene in 1977. Andrea Locatelli withdrew after injuring his coccyx in the first practice session and his fellow Italian Alessandro Tonucci was ruled unfit to compete after crashing in the second practice session. Heavy traffic affected qualifying and pole position was taken by Niccolò Antonelli for the third time in his career and his second of the season with a time of two minutes and 12.653 seconds. Antonelli was joined on the front row of the grid by Jorge Navarro in second and Oliviera in third. Kent took sixth but he was demoted to ninth after being found to ride slowly on the racing line due to him being unable to draft other riders. Oliviera made the best start in the field but was involved in a multi-rider battle involving Brad Binder, Navarro, Antonelli, Romano Fenati, Francesco Bagnaia and Jakub Kornfeil. Meanwhile, Kent fell seven places to be 16th at the end of the first lap but began recovering lost ground when some riders, including his teammates Hiroki Ono and Efrén Vázquez, clashed with each other and was in seventh place behind Antonelli by lap nine.

The lead swapped hands repeatedly almost every lap as the race drew on because of the slipstream effect down the two long straights of the circuit. With three laps remaining, Kent's recovery was helped when Bagania crashed at the final corner and nudged Antonelli wide to move into fifth the lap after and it appeared that he would win the championship. As the field began the final lap, Kent overtook Fenati for fourth at the first turn but was exposed to Antonelli who retook fifth shortly after. Kent then got back past Antonelli at the fourth corner but the latter responded by re-passing him at turn nine. The race was decided in the final moments when Oliviera drafted Binder on the back straight and passed him at the final corner. Oliviera successfully fended Binder off to clinch his fifth victory of the season and his second in a row. Navarro took third, Antonelli finished fourth for the second consecutive race, Fenati placed fifth and Kornfeil was sixth. Kent ran wide at the final corner and took seventh which meant he was now 24 points ahead of Oliviera and the championship would be decided at the season-closing round at Valencia and Kent needed to score two points to win the title. Enea Bastianini was four seconds behind Kent in eighth and Alexis Masbou and John McPhee rounded out the top ten.

== Classification ==
=== MotoGP ===
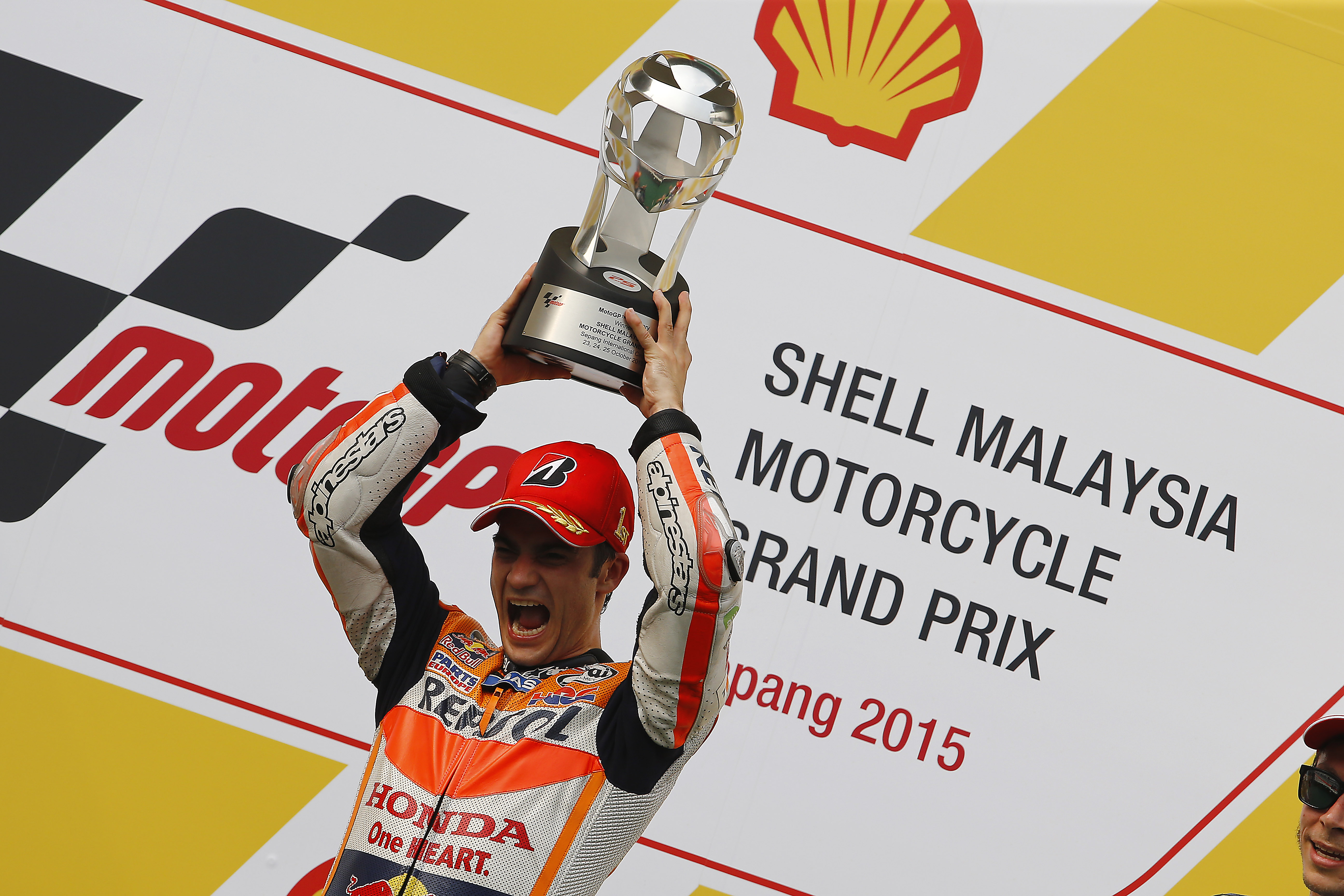
Dani Pedrosa, celebrating on the podium after winning the MotoGP race. The race was controversial due to the collision between Marc Márquez and Valentino Rossi.

Pos.	No.	Rider	Team	Manufacturer	Laps	Time/Retired	Grid	Points
1	26	(Spain) Dani Pedrosa	Repsol Honda Team	Honda	20	40:37.691	1	25
2	99	(Spain) Jorge Lorenzo	Movistar Yamaha MotoGP	Yamaha	20	+3.612	4	20
3	46	(Italy) Valentino Rossi	Movistar Yamaha MotoGP	Yamaha	20	+13.724	3	16
4	38	(United Kingdom) Bradley Smith	Monster Yamaha Tech 3	Yamaha	20	+23.995	9	13
5	35	(United Kingdom) Cal Crutchlow	LCR Honda	Honda	20	+28.721	5	11
6	9	(Italy) Danilo Petrucci	Octo Pramac Racing	Ducati	20	+36.372	12	10
7	41	(Spain) Aleix Espargaró	Team Suzuki Ecstar	Suzuki	20	+39.290	10	9
8	25	(Spain) Maverick Viñales	Team Suzuki Ecstar	Suzuki	20	+39.436	8	8
9	44	(Spain) Pol Espargaró	Monster Yamaha Tech 3	Yamaha	20	+42.462	11	7
10	6	(Germany) Stefan Bradl	Aprilia Racing Team Gresini	Aprilia	20	+44.601	13	6
11	45	(United Kingdom) Scott Redding	EG 0,0 Marc VDS	Honda	20	+47.690	14	5
12	68	(Colombia) Yonny Hernández	Octo Pramac Racing	Ducati	20	+52.112	17	4
13	8	(Spain) Héctor Barberá	Avintia Racing	Ducati	20	+52.360	25	3
14	24	(Spain) Toni Elías	Forward Racing	Yamaha Forward	20	+53.619	20	2
15	19	(Spain) Álvaro Bautista	Aprilia Racing Team Gresini	Aprilia	20	+53.631	16	1
16	69	(United States) Nicky Hayden	Aspar MotoGP Team	Honda	20	+1:01.431	18	
17	43	(Australia) Jack Miller	LCR Honda	Honda	20	+1:02.828	15	
18	63	(France) Mike Di Meglio	Avintia Racing	Ducati	20	+1:05.075	22	
19	50	(Republic of Ireland) Eugene Laverty	Aspar MotoGP Team	Honda	20	+1:09.877	21	
20	13	(Australia) Anthony West	AB Motoracing	Honda	20	+1:24.749	23	
Ret	4	(Italy) Andrea Dovizioso	Ducati Team	Ducati	10	Accident Damage	7	
Ret	93	(Spain) Marc Márquez	Repsol Honda Team	Honda	7	Collision Damage	2	
Ret	76	(France) Loris Baz	Forward Racing	Yamaha Forward	2	Accident Damage	19	
Ret	29	(Italy) Andrea Iannone	Ducati Team	Ducati	1	Radiator	6	
Ret	55	(Australia) Damian Cudlin	E-Motion IodaRacing Team	ART	0	Accident	24	

=== Moto2 ===
Pos.	No.	Rider	Manufacturer	Laps	Time/Retired	Grid	Points
1	5	(France) Johann Zarco	Kalex	19	40:37.772	2	25
2	12	(Switzerland) Thomas Lüthi	Kalex	19	+0.598	1	20
3	94	(Germany) Jonas Folger	Kalex	19	+9.846	4	16
4	30	(Japan) Takaaki Nakagami	Kalex	19	+14.139	7	13
5	7	(Italy) Lorenzo Baldassarri	Kalex	19	+16.440	5	11
6	39	(Spain) Luis Salom	Kalex	19	+22.294	13	10
7	11	(Germany) Sandro Cortese	Kalex	19	+22.708	6	9
8	55	(Malaysia) Hafizh Syahrin	Kalex	19	+26.685	18	8
9	3	(Italy) Simone Corsi	Kalex	19	+28.556	11	7
10	19	(Belgium) Xavier Siméon	Kalex	19	+30.081	10	6
11	49	(Spain) Axel Pons	Kalex	19	+30.873	16	5
12	36	(Finland) Mika Kallio	Speed Up	19	+31.787	14	4
13	22	(United Kingdom) Sam Lowes	Speed Up	19	+33.844	8	3
14	88	(Spain) Ricard Cardús	Suter	19	+33.886	24	2
15	21	(Italy) Franco Morbidelli	Kalex	19	+38.087	19	1
16	25	(Malaysia) Azlan Shah	Kalex	19	+41.612	15	
17	4	(Switzerland) Randy Krummenacher	Kalex	19	+42.239	23	
18	96	(France) Louis Rossi	Tech 3	19	+44.576	22	
19	70	(Switzerland) Robin Mulhauser	Kalex	19	+46.312	21	
20	57	(Spain) Edgar Pons	Kalex	19	+49.357	26	
21	2	(Switzerland) Jesko Raffin	Kalex	19	+56.476	28	
22	97	(Spain) Xavi Vierge	Tech 3	19	+1:17.119	25	
23	16	(Australia) Joshua Hook	Kalex	19	+1:18.343	29	
24	93	(Malaysia) Ramdan Rosli	Kalex	19	+1:18.534	30	
25	60	(Spain) Julián Simón	Speed Up	19	+1:20.599	12	
26	66	(Germany) Florian Alt	Suter	19	+1:37.028	27	
27	10	(Thailand) Thitipong Warokorn	Kalex	19	+1:51.965	20	
Ret	40	(Spain) Álex Rins	Kalex	9	Accident	3	
Ret	23	(Germany) Marcel Schrötter	Tech 3	8	Accident Damage	17	
Ret	73	(Spain) Álex Márquez	Kalex	5	Accident Damage	9	

=== Moto3 ===
Pos.	No.	Rider	Manufacturer	Laps	Time/Retired	Grid	Points
1	44	(Portugal) Miguel Oliveira	KTM	18	40:33.277	3	25
2	41	(South Africa) Brad Binder	KTM	18	+0.089	15	20
3	9	(Spain) Jorge Navarro	Honda	18	+0.273	2	16
4	23	(Italy) Niccolò Antonelli	Honda	18	+0.305	1	13
5	5	(Italy) Romano Fenati	KTM	18	+0.416	5	11
6	84	(Czech Republic) Jakub Kornfeil	KTM	18	+0.530	4	10
7	52	(United Kingdom) Danny Kent	Honda	18	+0.590	9	9
8	33	(Italy) Enea Bastianini	Honda	18	+4.004	8	8
9	10	(France) Alexis Masbou	Honda	18	+6.990	19	7
10	17	(United Kingdom) John McPhee	Honda	18	+10.030	12	6
11	95	(France) Jules Danilo	Honda	18	+16.128	28	5
12	88	(Spain) Jorge Martín	Mahindra	18	+18.995	13	4
13	29	(Italy) Stefano Manzi	Mahindra	18	+18.999	16	3
14	32	(Spain) Isaac Viñales	KTM	18	+19.129	18	2
15	65	(Germany) Philipp Öttl	KTM	18	+19.153	17	1
16	48	(Italy) Lorenzo Dalla Porta	Husqvarna	18	+19.592	23	
17	21	(Italy) Francesco Bagnaia	Mahindra	18	+32.053	6	
18	6	(Spain) María Herrera	Husqvarna	18	+32.882	24	
19	11	(Belgium) Livio Loi	Honda	18	+32.924	25	
20	58	(Spain) Juan Francisco Guevara	Mahindra	18	+33.307	22	
21	24	(Japan) Tatsuki Suzuki	Mahindra	18	+34.453	26	
22	2	(Australia) Remy Gardner	Mahindra	18	+55.705	31	
23	22	(Spain) Ana Carrasco	KTM	18	+57.562	29	
24	16	(Italy) Andrea Migno	KTM	18	+1:46.290	27	
25	91	(Argentina) Gabriel Rodrigo	KTM	17	+1 lap	20	
Ret	98	(Czech Republic) Karel Hanika	KTM	6	Accident	14	
Ret	96	(Italy) Manuel Pagliani	Mahindra	6	Accident	30	
Ret	7	(Spain) Efrén Vázquez	Honda	5	Accident	7	
Ret	76	(Japan) Hiroki Ono	Honda	5	Accident	11	
Ret	63	(Malaysia) Zulfahmi Khairuddin	KTM	5	Accident Damage	10	
Ret	40	(South Africa) Darryn Binder	Mahindra	2	Retirement	21	
DNS	19	(Italy) Alessandro Tonucci	Mahindra		Did not start		
DNS	55	(Italy) Andrea Locatelli	Honda		Did not start		

== Championship standings after the race (MotoGP) ==
Below are the standings for the top five riders and constructors after round seventeen has concluded.

Riders' Championship standings

Pos.	Rider	Points
1	(Italy) Valentino Rossi	312
2	(Spain) Jorge Lorenzo	305
3	(Spain) Marc Márquez	222
4	(Spain) Dani Pedrosa	190
5	(Italy) Andrea Iannone	188

Constructors' Championship standings

Pos.	Constructor	Points
1	(Japan) Yamaha	382
2	(Japan) Honda	335
3	(Italy) Ducati	247
4	(Japan) Suzuki	129
5	(Switzerland) Yamaha Forward	35

Teams' Championship standings

Pos.	Team	Points
1	(Japan) Movistar Yamaha MotoGP	617
2	(Japan) Repsol Honda Team	417
3	(Italy) Ducati Team	341
4	(France) Monster Energy Tech 3	274
5	(Japan) Team Suzuki Ecstar	189

- Note: Only the top five positions are included for all sets of standings.

Previous race: 2015 Australian Grand Prix	FIM Grand Prix World Championship; 2015 season	Next race: 2015 Valencian Grand Prix
Previous race: 2014 Malaysian Grand Prix	Malaysian motorcycle Grand Prix	Next race: 2016 Malaysian Grand Prix
