= List of Grand Prix motorcycle racing World Constructors' Champions =

Grand Prix motorcycle racing is the premier championship of motorcycle road racing, which has been divided into three classes: MotoGP, Moto2, and Moto3. Former classes that have been discontinued include 350cc, 250cc, 125cc, 50cc/80cc, MotoE, and Sidecar. The Grand Prix Road-Racing World Championship was established in 1949 by the sport's governing body, the Fédération Internationale de Motocyclisme (FIM), and is the oldest motorsport world championship in existence.

There were five classes when the championship started in 1949: 500cc, 350cc, 250cc, 125cc, and sidecar (600cc). The 50cc class was introduced in 1962. Due to escalating costs that resulted in a number of manufacturers leaving the championship, the FIM limited the 50cc bikes to a single cylinder, the 125cc and 250cc bikes were limited to two cylinders, and the 350cc and 500cc bikes were limited to four cylinders. The 350cc class was discontinued after 1982, two years later the 50cc class was replaced with an 80cc class, which was discontinued after 1989. The sidecar class left the series to form its own championship after 1996. In 2002, 990cc bikes replaced the 500cc bikes and the class was renamed as MotoGP. 600cc bikes replaced the 250cc bikes in 2010, with the class rebranded as Moto2. Starting 2012, the Moto3 class (250cc one cylinder) replaced the 125cc class.

The 750cc was never part of the Grand Prix motorcycle racing series.

The Constructors' World Championship is awarded to the most successful constructor over a season, as determined by a points system based on Grand Prix results. Only the highest-scoring rider in each race for each constructor contributing points towards the Championship. The winner of the constructors' world championship is not necessarily the bike used by the riders' world champion. For example, in 2004, Valentino Rossi who rode a Yamaha bike won the riders' world championship, but in the constructors' standings, Honda have higher points than Yamaha, therefore Honda won constructors' world championship.

For the sidecar class, the constructors championship went to the engine manufacturer, not the chassis manufacturer. For the Moto2 class, the championship goes to the chassis manufacturer, not the engine manufacturer, since all competitors are required to use spec engines provided by Triumph (Honda from 2010 until 2018).

== By year ==
Key
(X)	Denotes the number of times the constructor has won the championship for that class
*	Winning constructor is different from the bike manufacturer of the Riders' Champion that year
Constructor	Championship is not officially recognized

Year	500cc	350cc	250cc	125cc	Sidecar
1949	(United Kingdom) AJS (1)	(United Kingdom) Velocette (1)	(Italy) Moto Guzzi (1)	(Italy) Mondial (1)	(United Kingdom) Norton (1)
1950	(United Kingdom) Norton* (1)	(United Kingdom) Velocette (2)	(Italy) Benelli (1)	(Italy) Mondial (2)	(United Kingdom) Norton (2)
1951	(United Kingdom) Norton (2)	(United Kingdom) Norton (1)	(Italy) Moto Guzzi (2)	(Italy) Mondial (3)	(United Kingdom) Norton (3)
1952	(Italy) Gilera (1)	(United Kingdom) Norton (2)	(Italy) Moto Guzzi (3)	(Italy) MV Agusta (1)	(United Kingdom) Norton (4)
1953	(Italy) Gilera (2)	(Italy) Moto Guzzi (1)	(West Germany) NSU (1)	(Italy) MV Agusta* (2)	(United Kingdom) Norton (5)
1954 (Note: Constructors' titles for all classes were not recognized by the FIM following a political crisis with the constructors (represented by the International Permanent Bureau of Motorcycle Manufacturers) concerning the number of races to be held during the season and the abolition of the riders' championship.)	(Italy) Gilera	(Italy) Moto Guzzi	(West Germany) NSU	(West Germany) NSU	(United Kingdom) Norton
1955	(Italy) Gilera (3)	(Italy) Moto Guzzi (2)	(Italy) MV Agusta* (1)	(Italy) MV Agusta (3)	(West Germany) BMW (1)
1956	(Italy) MV Agusta (1)	(Italy) Moto Guzzi (3)	(Italy) MV Agusta (2)	(Italy) MV Agusta (4)	(West Germany) BMW (2)
1957	(Italy) Gilera (4)	(Italy) Gilera* (1)	(Italy) Mondial (1)	(Italy) Mondial (4)	(West Germany) BMW (3)
1958	(Italy) MV Agusta (2)	(Italy) MV Agusta (1)	(Italy) MV Agusta (3)	(Italy) MV Agusta (5)	(West Germany) BMW (4)
1959	(Italy) MV Agusta (3)	(Italy) MV Agusta (2)	(Italy) MV Agusta (4)	(Italy) MV Agusta (6)	(West Germany) BMW (5)
1960	(Italy) MV Agusta (4)	(Italy) MV Agusta (3)	(Italy) MV Agusta (5)	(Italy) MV Agusta (7)	(West Germany) BMW (6)
1961	(Italy) MV Agusta (5)	(Italy) MV Agusta (4)	(Japan) Honda (1)	(Japan) Honda (1)	(West Germany) BMW (7)

Year	500cc	350cc	250cc	125cc	50cc	Sidecar
1962	(Italy) MV Agusta (6)	(Japan) Honda (1)	(Japan) Honda (2)	(Japan) Honda (2)	(Japan) Suzuki (1)	(West Germany) BMW (8)
1963	(Italy) MV Agusta (7)	(Japan) Honda (2)	(Japan) Honda (3)	(Japan) Suzuki (1)	(Japan) Suzuki (2)	(West Germany) BMW (9)
1964	(Italy) MV Agusta (8)	(Japan) Honda (3)	(Japan) Yamaha (1)	(Japan) Honda (3)	(Japan) Suzuki (3)	(West Germany) BMW (10)
1965	(Italy) MV Agusta (9)	(Japan) Honda (4)	(Japan) Yamaha (2)	(Japan) Suzuki (2)	(Japan) Honda (1)	(West Germany) BMW (11)
1966	(Japan) Honda* (1)	(Japan) Honda (5)	(Japan) Honda (4)	(Japan) Honda (4)	(Japan) Honda* (2)	(West Germany) BMW (12)
1967	(Italy) MV Agusta (10)	(Japan) Honda (6)	(Japan) Honda (5)	(Japan) Yamaha (1)	(Japan) Suzuki (4)	(West Germany) BMW (13)
1968	(Italy) MV Agusta (11)	(Italy) MV Agusta (5)	(Japan) Yamaha (3)	(Japan) Yamaha (2)	(Japan) Suzuki (5)	(West Germany) BMW (14)
1969	(Italy) MV Agusta (12)	(Italy) MV Agusta (6)	(Italy) Benelli (2)	(Japan) Kawasaki (1)	(Spain) Derbi (1)	(West Germany) BMW (15)
1970	(Italy) MV Agusta (13)	(Italy) MV Agusta (7)	(Japan) Yamaha (4)	(Japan) Suzuki (3)	(Spain) Derbi (2)	(West Germany) BMW (16)
1971	(Italy) MV Agusta (14)	(Italy) MV Agusta (8)	(Japan) Yamaha (5)	(Spain) Derbi (1)	(West Germany) Kreidler (1)	(West Germany) BMW (17)
1972	(Italy) MV Agusta (15)	(Italy) MV Agusta (9)	(Japan) Yamaha (6)	(Spain) Derbi (2)	(West Germany) Kreidler* (2)	(West Germany) BMW (18)
1973	(Italy) MV Agusta (16)	(Japan) Yamaha* (1)	(Japan) Yamaha (7)	(Japan) Yamaha (3)	(Germany) Kreidler (3)	(West Germany) BMW (19)
1974	(Japan) Yamaha* (1)	(Japan) Yamaha (2)	(Japan) Yamaha* (8)	(Japan) Yamaha (4)	(West Germany) Kreidler (4)	(West Germany) König (1)
1975	(Japan) Yamaha (2)	(Japan) Yamaha (3)	(United States) Harley-Davidson (1)	(Italy) Morbidelli (1)	(West Germany) Kreidler (5)	(West Germany) König (2)
1976	(Japan) Suzuki (1)	(Japan) Yamaha* (4)	(United States) Harley-Davidson (Note: Championship not officially awarded due to Harley Davidson's non-compliance with FIM Regulations.)	(Italy) Morbidelli (2)	(Spain) Bultaco (1)	(Germany) König (3)
1977	(Japan) Suzuki (2)	(Japan) Yamaha (5)	(Japan) Yamaha* (9)	(Italy) Morbidelli (3)	(Spain) Bultaco (2)	(Japan) Yamaha (1)
1978	(Japan) Suzuki* (3)	(Japan) Kawasaki (1)	(Japan) Kawasaki (1)	(Italy) Minarelli (Note: Championship not officially recognized.)	(Spain) Bultaco (3)	(Japan) Yamaha (2)

Year	500cc	350cc	250cc	125cc	50cc	Sidecar B2A	Sidecar B2B
1979	(Japan) Suzuki* (4)	(Japan) Kawasaki (2)	(Japan) Kawasaki (2)	(Italy) Minarelli (1)	(West Germany) Kreidler (6)	(Japan) Yamaha (3)	(Japan) Yamaha (4)

Year	500cc	350cc	250cc	125cc	50cc	Sidecar
1980	(Japan) Suzuki* (5)	(Italy) Bimota-Yamaha (1)	(Japan) Kawasaki (3)	(Italy) Minarelli* (2)	(West Germany) Kreidler (7)	(Japan) Yamaha (5)
1981	(Japan) Suzuki (6)	(Japan) Kawasaki (3)	(Japan) Kawasaki (4)	(Italy) Minarelli (3)	(Spain) Bultaco (4)	(Japan) Yamaha (6)

Year	500cc	350cc	250cc	125cc	Sidecar
1982 (Note: 50cc Constructors' Championship not awarded.)	(Japan) Suzuki (7)	(Japan) Kawasaki (4)	(Japan) Yamaha (10)	(Italy) Garelli (1)	(Japan) Yamaha (7)

Year	500cc	250cc	125cc	50cc	Sidecar
1983	(Japan) Honda (2)	(Japan) Yamaha (11)	(Italy) MBA* (1)	(Italy) Garelli* (1)	(Japan) Yamaha (8)

Year	500cc	250cc	125cc	80cc	Sidecar
1984	(Japan) Honda* (3)	(Japan) Yamaha (12)	(Italy) Garelli (2)	(West Germany) Zündapp (1)	(Japan) Yamaha (9)
1985	(Japan) Honda (4)	(Japan) Honda (6)	(Italy) MBA* (2)	(West Germany) Krauser (1)	(Japan) Yamaha (10)
1986	(Japan) Yamaha (3)	(Japan) Honda* (7)	(Italy) Garelli (3)	(Spain) Derbi (1)	(Japan) Yamaha (11)
1987	(Japan) Yamaha* (4)	(Japan) Honda (8)	(Italy) Garelli (4)	(Spain) Derbi (2)	(West Germany) Krauser (1)
1988	(Japan) Yamaha (5)	(Japan) Honda (9)	(Spain) Derbi (3)	(Spain) Derbi (3)	(West Germany) Krauser (2)
1989	(Japan) Honda (5)	(Japan) Honda (10)	(Japan) Honda* (5)	(West Germany) Krauser* (2)	(West Germany) Krauser (3)

Year	500cc	250cc	125cc	Sidecar
1990	(Japan) Yamaha (6)	(Japan) Yamaha (13)	(Japan) Honda (6)	(West Germany) Krauser (4)
1991	(Japan) Yamaha (7)	(Japan) Honda (11)	(Japan) Honda (7)	(Germany) Krauser (5)
1992	(Japan) Honda* (6)	(Japan) Honda (12)	(Japan) Honda* (8)	(Germany) Krauser (6)
1993	(Japan) Yamaha* (8)	(Japan) Honda* (13)	(Japan) Honda (9)	(Germany) Krauser (7)
1994	(Japan) Honda (7)	(Japan) Honda* (14)	(Japan) Honda* (10)	(Switzerland) LCR-ADM (1)
1995	(Japan) Honda (8)	(Italy) Aprilia (1)	(Japan) Honda (11)	(Switzerland) LCR-ADM (2)
1996	(Japan) Honda (9)	(Japan) Honda* (15)	(Italy) Aprilia* (1)	(Switzerland) LCR-ADM (3)

Year	500cc	250cc	125cc
1997	(Japan) Honda (10)	(Japan) Honda (16)	(Italy) Aprilia (2)
1998	(Japan) Honda (11)	(Italy) Aprilia (2)	(Japan) Honda* (12)
1999	(Japan) Honda (12)	(Italy) Aprilia (3)	(Japan) Honda (13)
2000	(Japan) Yamaha* (9)	(Japan) Yamaha (14)	(Japan) Honda* (14)
2001	(Japan) Honda (13)	(Japan) Honda (17)	(Japan) Honda* (15)

Year	MotoGP	250cc	125cc
2002	(Japan) Honda (14)	(Italy) Aprilia (4)	(Italy) Aprilia (3)
2003	(Japan) Honda (15)	(Italy) Aprilia (5)	(Italy) Aprilia* (4)
2004	(Japan) Honda* (16)	(Japan) Honda (18)	(Italy) Aprilia* (5)
2005	(Japan) Yamaha (10)	(Japan) Honda (19)	(Austria) KTM* (1)
2006	(Japan) Honda (17)	(Italy) Aprilia (6)	(Italy) Aprilia (6)
2007	(Italy) Ducati (1)	(Italy) Aprilia (7)	(Italy) Aprilia (7)
2008	(Japan) Yamaha (11)	(Italy) Aprilia* (8)	(Italy) Aprilia* (8)
2009	(Japan) Yamaha (12)	(Italy) Aprilia* (9)	(Italy) Aprilia (9)

Year	MotoGP	Moto2	125cc
2010	(Japan) Yamaha (13)	(Switzerland) Suter* (1)	(Spain) Derbi (4)
2011	(Japan) Honda (18)	(Switzerland) Suter* (2)	(Italy) Aprilia (10)

Year	MotoGP	Moto2	Moto3
2012	(Japan) Honda* (19)	(Switzerland) Suter (3)	(Austria) KTM (1)
2013	(Japan) Honda (20)	(Germany) Kalex (1)	(Austria) KTM (2)
2014	(Japan) Honda (21)	(Germany) Kalex (2)	(Austria) KTM* (3)
2015	(Japan) Yamaha (14)	(Germany) Kalex (3)	(Japan) Honda (1)
2016	(Japan) Honda (22)	(Germany) Kalex (4)	(Austria) KTM (4)
2017	(Japan) Honda (23)	(Germany) Kalex (5)	(Japan) Honda (2)
2018	(Japan) Honda (24)	(Germany) Kalex (6)	(Japan) Honda (3)
2019	(Japan) Honda (25)	(Germany) Kalex (7)	(Japan) Honda (4)
2020	(Italy) Ducati* (2)	(Germany) Kalex (8)	(Japan) Honda* (5)
2021	(Italy) Ducati* (3)	(Germany) Kalex (9)	(Austria) KTM (5)
2022	(Italy) Ducati (4)	(Germany) Kalex (10)	(Spain) GasGas (1)
2023	(Italy) Ducati (5)	(Germany) Kalex (11)	(Austria) KTM* (6)
2024	(Italy) Ducati (6)	(Germany) Kalex* (12)	(China) CFMoto (1)
2025	(Italy) Ducati (7)	(Germany) Kalex (13)	(Austria) KTM (7)
2026		(Germany) Kalex (14)	(Austria) KTM (8)

== By constructor ==
Constructors in bold are participating in any of the classes of the 2026 World Championship. Unrecognized titles are not counted.

Constructor	MotoGP / 500cc	Moto2	Moto3	350cc	250cc	125cc	80cc	50cc	Sidecar / B2A / B2B	Total
(Japan) **Honda**	25		5	6	19	15		2		72
(Japan) **Yamaha**	14			5	14	4			11	48
(Italy) MV Agusta	16			9	5	7				37
(Italy) **Aprilia**					9	10				19
(Germany) BMW									19	19
(Japan) Suzuki	7					3		5		15
(Germany) **Kalex**		14								14
(United Kingdom) Norton	2			2					5	9
(Austria) **KTM**			8			1				9
(Japan) Kawasaki				4	4	1				9
(Spain) Derbi						4	3	2		9
(Germany) Krauser							2		7	9
(Italy) **Ducati**	7									7
(Germany) Kreidler								7		7
(Italy) Moto Guzzi				3	3					6
(Italy) Gilera	4			1						5
(Italy) Mondial					1	4				5
(Italy) Garelli						4		1		5
(Spain) Bultaco								4		4
(Switzerland) Suter		3								3
(Italy) Morbidelli						3				3
(Italy) Minarelli						3				3
(Germany) König									3	3
(Switzerland) LCR-ADM									3	3
(United Kingdom) Velocette				2						2
(Italy) Benelli					2					2
(Italy) MBA						2				2
(United Kingdom) AJS	1									1
(Spain) GasGas			1							1
(China) CFMoto			1							1
(Italy) Bimota-Yamaha				1						1
(Germany) NSU					1					1
(United States) Harley-Davidson					1					1
(Germany) Zündapp							1			1
Total	76	17	15	33	59	61	6	21	48	336

== By country ==
Countries in bold have a constructor of that nationality participating in any of the classes of the 2026 World Championship.

Country	MotoGP / 500cc	Moto2	Moto3	350cc	250cc	125cc	80cc	50cc	Sidecar / B2A / B2B	Total
**Japan**	46		5	15	37	23		7	11	144
**Italy**	27			14	20	33		1		95
**Germany**		14			1		3	7	29	54
Spain			1			4	3	6		14
United Kingdom	3			4					5	12
**Austria**			8			1				9
Switzerland		3							3	6
China			1							1
United States					1					1
Total	76	17	15	33	59	61	6	21	48	336
