= List of American Championship car racing points scoring systems =

This is a list of points scoring systems used to determine the outcome of American open-wheel car racing (often referred to colloquially as Indy car racing) championships in 1905, 1916, and from 1920 onwards. The championships were awarded each year to the driver who accumulated the most championship points during the course of the season.

== Inaugural points scoring system ==
=== AAA Championship 1905 ===
- Barney Oldfield was the points champion of the inaugural American Automobile Association (AAA) sanctioned season in 1905, organized by the AAA Racing Board. Following the 1905 season, the AAA sanctioned no further races until 1909, by which time the Racing Board had been reorganized by the AAA into the Contest Board.
- Despite the resumption of sanctioned racing, the Contest Board did not award points towards a championship again until 1916.

== Mileage based points scoring systems ==
=== AAA Championship 1916 ===
- Dario Resta was the champion of the 1916 season, during which the Contest Board awarded championship points to the first ten drivers in each race. There were only points for ranks in races, no bonus points. The points system was based in general on race distance but not on mileage factor.
- Drivers had to be running at the finish in order to score points. Points were moved to the next eligible driver if a finisher completed fewer laps than a non-finisher. Points scored by drivers sharing a car were split according to the respective percentage of the race those drivers had driven. Drivers who started a race were not allowed to score points as relief drivers; a race-starter finishing a race driving a different car from that in which they had started would accumulate no points, even if they had driven the latter car to what would normally have been a points-paying finish.
- While the Contest Board continued sanctioning Championship car races after 1916, they did not award points towards another championship until 1920.

Race distance	1st	2nd	3rd	4th	5th	6th	7th	8th	9th	10th
100 miles	500	260	140	80	50	30	15	10	0	0
150 miles	600	320	170	90	55	35	20	15	0	0
200 miles	700	360	190	100	60	40	25	20	10	0
250 miles	800	420	220	120	70	45	30	25	15	10
300 miles	900	470	240	130	80	50	40	30	25	20
350 miles or higher	1000	520	270	140	90	60	50	40	30	25

=== AAA Championships 1920–1929 ===
- From 1920 through 1929, championship points were awarded to the first ten drivers. There were only points for ranks in races, no bonus points. The points system was based on mileage factor. The winner received 2 points per mile.
- Drivers had to be running at the finish to score points. Points scored by drivers sharing a ride were split according to percentage of race driven. Starters were not allowed to score points as relief drivers (except 1920), if a race starter finished the race in another car in a points-scoring position those points were not awarded.

Race distance	1st	2nd	3rd	4th	5th	6th	7th	8th	9th	10th
40 miles	80	45	25	15	10	0	0	0	0	0
50 miles	100	55	30	20	10	5	0	0	0	0
60 miles	120	65	35	25	15	0	0	0	0	0
80 miles	160	80	45	30	20	0	0	0	0	0
100 miles	200	110	60	35	20	15	10	5	0	0
150 miles	300	160	90	50	30	20	15	10	0	0
200 miles	400	210	110	60	40	25	15	10	0	0
250 miles	500	260	140	80	50	35	25	15	10	5
300 miles	600	420	220	120	70	45	35	25	15	10
400 miles	800	420	220	120	70	45	35	25	15	10
500 miles	1000	520	270	140	90	60	50	40	35	30

=== AAA Championships 1930–1936 ===
- Between 1930 and 1936, the Championship points were awarded to the first ten drivers. There were only points for ranks in races, no bonus points. The points system was based on mileage factor. The winner receive 1.2 points per mile. The points gaps between the ranks were also changed from a relatively arbitrary scheme to a uniform allocation.
- Drivers had to be running at the finish to score points. Points scored by drivers sharing a ride were split according to percentage of race driven. Starters were not allowed to score points as relief drivers, if a race starter finished the race in another car in a points-scoring position those points were not awarded.

Race distance	1st	2nd	3rd	4th	5th	6th	7th	8th	9th	10th
25 miles	30	22.5	20	17.5	15	12.5	10	7.5	5	2.5
100 miles	120	90	80	70	60	50	40	30	20	10
150 miles	180	135	120	105	90	75	60	45	30	15
200 miles	240	180	160	140	120	100	80	60	40	20
300 miles	360	270	240	210	180	150	120	90	60	30
500 miles	600	450	400	350	300	250	200	150	100	50

=== AAA Championships 1937–1941 ===
- Between 1937 and 1941, the Championship points were awarded to the first twelve drivers. There were only points for ranks in races, no bonus points. The points system was based on mileage factor. The winner received 2 points per mile.
- Drivers had to complete 50% of the race distance to score points. Points scored by drivers sharing a ride were split according to percentage of race driven. Starters were not allowed to score points as relief drivers, if a race starter finished the race in another car in a points-scoring position those points were not awarded.

Race distance	1st	2nd	3rd	4th	5th	6th	7th	8th	9th	10th	11th	12th
100 miles	200	165	135	110	90	75	65	55	45	35	25	15
300 miles	600	495	405	330	270	225	195	165	135	105	75	45
500 miles	1000	825	675	550	450	375	325	275	225	175	125	75

=== AAA Championships 1946–1955 and USAC Championships 1956–1977 ===
- Between 1946 and 1977, AAA and USAC awarded the Championship points to the first twelve drivers. There were only points for ranks in races, no bonus points. The points system was based on mileage factor. The winner received 2 points per mile. This is the most common points system in IndyCar, used over 3 decades of racing.
- Points scored by drivers sharing a ride were split according to percentage of race driven. Drivers who started in one car were allowed to score points in another as a relief driver.

Race distance	1st	2nd	3rd	4th	5th	6th	7th	8th	9th	10th	11th	12th
50 miles	100	80	70	60	50	40	30	25	20	15	10	5
100 miles	200	160	140	120	100	80	60	50	40	30	20	10
150 miles	300	240	210	180	150	120	90	75	60	45	30	15
200 miles	400	320	280	240	200	160	120	100	80	60	40	20
250 miles	500	400	350	300	250	200	150	125	100	75	50	25
300 miles	600	480	420	360	300	240	180	150	120	90	60	30
400 miles	800	640	560	480	400	320	240	200	160	120	80	40
500 miles	1000	800	700	600	500	400	300	250	200	150	100	50

=== USAC/CART Championships 1978–1980 ===
- One year before the split with CART, USAC extended their points scoring system to award points to all race entrants. CART continued to use this modified USAC points scoring system in the following seasons (1979 and 1980).
- There were only points for ranks in races, no bonus points. The points system was based on a mileage factor, the winner receiving 2 points per mile.
- Points scored by drivers sharing a ride were split according to percentage of race driven. Drivers who started in one car were allowed to score points in another as a relief driver.

Race distance	1st	2nd	3rd	4th	5th	6th	7th	8th	9th	10th	11th	12th	13th–16th	17th–20th	21st–24th	25th–28th	29th+
100 miles	200	160	140	120	100	80	60	50	40	30	20	10	5	4	3	2	1
150 miles	300	240	210	180	150	120	90	75	60	45	30	15	8	6	5	3	2
200 miles	400	320	280	240	200	160	120	100	80	60	40	20	10	8	6	4	2
250 miles	500	400	350	300	250	200	150	125	100	75	50	25	12	10	8	5	3
300 miles	600	480	420	360	300	240	180	150	120	90	60	30	15	12	9	6	3
400 miles	800	640	560	480	400	320	240	200	160	120	80	40	20	16	12	8	4
500 miles	1000	800	700	600	500	400	300	250	200	150	100	50	25	20	15	10	5

=== USAC Gold Crown Championship 1981–1995 ===
- After the split with CART, USAC continued to use their points system to award championship points for their "Gold Crown Championship". They used the 200-mile points scheme for 100-mile dirt track races and the 500-mile points scheme for the Indianapolis 500.

Type of race	1st	2nd	3rd	4th	5th	6th	7th	8th	9th	10th	11th	12th	13th–16th	17th–20th	21st–24th	25th–28th	29th+
Dirt track	400	320	280	240	200	160	120	100	80	60	40	20	10	8	6	4	2
Indy 500	1000	800	700	600	500	400	300	250	200	150	100	50	25	20	15	10	5

=== CART Championships 1981 and 1982 ===
- For the 1981 and 1982 seasons CART continued to use the USAC points scoring system, but they divided the points values by 10, so the winner received only 0.2 points per mile.
- For the first time, there were bonus points. The driver with the fastest qualifying lap, usually on pole position, and the driver with the most laps led received bonus points in addition to their finishing order points. Bonus points multiplied by a mileage factor the same as the race points.
- In 1982, CART awarded 300 mile points for 300-, 400-, and 500-mile races.

Race distance	1st	2nd	3rd	4th	5th	6th	7th	8th	9th	10th	11th	12th–20th	Most laps led	Pole position
100 miles	20	16	14	12	10	8	6	5	4	3	2	1	1	1
200 miles	40	32	28	24	20	16	12	10	8	6	4	2	2	2
300 miles	60	48	42	36	30	24	18	15	12	9	6	3	3	3
400 miles	80	64	56	48	40	32	24	20	16	12	8	4	4	4
500 miles	100	80	70	60	50	40	30	25	20	15	10	5	5	5

== Equal points per race ==
=== Ranking points ===
- Beginning with the 1983 season, CART used their own scoring system. As previously, only the first twelve drivers finishing each race were awarded points. All races got the same number of points, based on the 100 mile points scheme from USAC with the points values divided by 10.

Championship	1st	2nd	3rd	4th	5th	6th	7th	8th	9th	10th	11th	12th
CART 1983–2003	20	16	14	12	10	8	6	5	4	3	2	1

- After CART had been replaced in 2004 by the Champ Car World Series, a new points system was also introduced. The first 20 drivers finishing each race were awarded points. The points scoring system is similar to the original CART points scoring system.

Championship	1st	2nd	3rd	4th	5th	6th	7th	8th	9th	10th	11th	12th	13th	14th	15th	16th	17th	18th	19th	20th
CCWS 2004–2007	31	27	25	23	21	19	17	15	13	11	10	9	8	7	6	5	4	3	2	1

- Although the Indy Racing League commissioned USAC to perform the races, the old USAC points system was not reused. Instead, IRL used its own simple points scoring system for all races, regardless of the distance. The first 33 drivers finishing the race were awarded points, starting with 2 points for position 33. Between the winner and second place was a 2-point gap, between all other ranks a 1-point gap.
- In the 1996 season, there was a multiplier for awarding points in the second (Phoenix) and third (Indianapolis) races of the season. Drivers were credited with overall points multiplied by the number of races they had competed in. For example, Scott Sharp had scored a sum of 82 points in the first three race, so he was awarded 246 championship points (82 multiplied by 3) at the end of the season.
- In the 1997 season, there wasn't a multiplier, but an additional point was awarded for positions 34 and 35 because of the extended Indy 500 entry list.

Championship	1st	2nd	3rd	4th	5th	6th	7th	8th	9th	10th	11th	12th	13th	14th	15th	16th	17th	18th	19th	20th	21st	22nd	23rd	24th	25th	26th	27th	28th	29th	30th	31st	32nd	33rd	34th	35th
IRL 1996–1997	35	33	32	31	30	29	28	27	26	25	24	23	22	21	20	19	18	17	16	15	14	13	12	11	10	9	8	7	6	5	4	3	2	1	1

- After taking over the driving operation from USAC in 1998, IRL also changed its points system. All participants of a race were eligible for championship points, even non-starters received points starting in 1999. The points scoring system applied to all races, regardless of race length or importance.
- In 2004, IRL modified their points scoring system again. Positions from 18 to 24 received the same number of 12 points instead of a decreasing score, where positions 25 to 33 received 10 points. This was a consequence of the introduction of shorter twin races, in which only half the number of points was awarded and the point structure ws easier to divide by 2 eliminating 0.5 points.
- Non-starters received full race points in 2004 and 2005, and half race points beginning with 2006.
- In 2013, the ICS modified the points awarded to positions 19–25. It essentially corresponds to the decreasing points scheme of 2003, but with 5 points for all ranks beginning with 25th position. This system is still in use as of 2025.

Championship	1st	2nd	3rd	4th	5th	6th	7th	8th	9th	10th	11th	12th	13th	14th	15th	16th	17th	18th	19th	20th	21st	22nd	23rd	24th	25th	26th	27th	28th	29th	30th	31st	32nd	33rd
IRL 1998–2003	50	40	35	32	30	28	26	24	22	20	19	18	17	16	15	14	13	12	11	10	9	8	7	6	5	4	3	2	1	1	1	1	1
ICS 2004–2012	50	40	35	32	30	28	26	24	22	20	19	18	17	16	15	14	13	12	12	12	12	12	12	12	10	10	10	10	10	10	10	10	10
ICS 2013–present	50	40	35	32	30	28	26	24	22	20	19	18	17	16	15	14	13	12	11	10	9	8	7	6	5	5	5	5	5	5	5	5	5

=== Bonus points ===
Championship	Leading a lap	Most laps led	Fastest race lap	Most positions improved	Leading slowest qualifying group	Final qualification Pole Position
CART 1983–2001	0	1	0	0	0	1
CART 2002–2003	0	1	0	0	1	1
CCWS 2004–2006	1	0	1	1	1	1
CCWS 2007	0	0	1	1	1	1
IRL 1997	0	1	0	0	0	2
IRL 1998–2000	0	2	0	0	0	3; 2; 1
IRL 2001–2003	0	2	0	0	0	0
ICS 2004–2008	0	3	0	0	0	0
ICS 2009–2012	0	2	0	0	0	1
ICS 2013–present	1	2	0	0	0	1

== Special Events ==
=== Indy qualifying and other qualifying races ===
- Starting with the 2010 season, IndyCar introduced a points scoring system for the Indy 500 qualification. As a result, no additional bonus point for the pole position is awarded for this race.
- In 2013, there was a qualifying race in Iowa instead of a qualifying practice. For this race, nine points were awarded down to one point for the first twelve finishers.
- In 2014 points were awarded on both Indy qualifying days: on Saturday points were awarded to all 33 drivers, on Sunday only the Fast Nine Qualifiers were awarded points.
- In 2015 no points were awarded due to last minute changes to the qualifying rules.
- In 2016 the separated points schemes from 2014 were added together and all drivers who started the race were awarded points after the last qualifying round.
- Between 2018 and 2021 points were awarded only for the Fast Nine Qualifiers.
- Since 2022, the top twelve qualifying positions receive points.

Year	1st	2nd	3rd	4th	5th	6th	7th	8th	9th	10th	11th	12th	13th	14th	15th	16th	17th	18th	19th	20th	21st	22nd	23rd	24th	25th	26th	27th	28th	29th	30th	31st	32nd	33rd
2010–2013	15	13	12	11	10	9	8	7	6	4	4	4	4	4	4	4	4	4	4	4	4	4	4	4	3	3	3	3	3	3	3	3	3
2013 Iowa qualifying race	9	8	7	6	5	4	3	3	2	2	1	1	0	0	0	0	0	0	0	0	0	0	0	0	0	0	0	0	0	0	0	0	0
2014 (Sat.)	33	32	31	30	29	28	27	26	25	24	23	22	21	20	19	18	17	16	15	14	13	12	11	10	9	8	7	6	5	4	3	2	1
2014 (Sun.)	9	8	7	6	5	4	3	2	1	0	0	0	0	0	0	0	0	0	0	0	0	0	0	0	0	0	0	0	0	0	0	0	0
2016–2017	42	40	38	36	34	32	30	28	26	24	23	22	21	20	19	18	17	16	15	14	13	12	11	10	9	8	7	6	5	4	3	2	1
2018–2021	9	8	7	6	5	4	3	2	1	0	0	0	0	0	0	0	0	0	0	0	0	0	0	0	0	0	0	0	0	0	0	0	0
2022–present	12	11	10	9	8	7	6	5	4	3	2	1	0	0	0	0	0	0	0	0	0	0	0	0	0	0	0	0	0	0	0	0	0

=== Twin races with half points 2011 ===
- In 2011, the race at Texas Motor Speedway was divided into two short races. Rounded half points were awarded for both races.

Event	1st	2nd	3rd	4th	5th	6th	7th	8th	9th	10th	11th	12th	13th	14th	15th	16th	17th	18th	19th	20th	21st	22nd	23rd	24th	25th+	Non-starters
2011 Twin races in Texas	25	20	18	16	15	14	13	12	11	10	9	9	8	8	7	7	6	6	6	6	6	6	6	6	5	3

=== Double point events 2014–2022 ===
- From 2014–2022, double points were awarded for the Indianapolis 500.
- In 2014, double points were awarded for all 500-mile events — the Indianapolis 500, as well as events held at Pocono and Fontana.
- From 2015–2019, double points were awarded for the season finale, regardless of race length or type of track.
- In 2023, the double points were dropped and all races awarded the same amount of points.

Event	1st	2nd	3rd	4th	5th	6th	7th	8th	9th	10th	11th	12th	13th	14th	15th	16th	17th	18th	19th	20th	21st	22nd	23rd	24th	25th+	Non-starters
Double points events	100	80	70	64	60	56	52	48	44	40	38	36	34	32	30	28	26	24	22	20	18	16	14	12	10	5

== See also ==
- List of NASCAR points scoring systems
- List of Formula One World Championship points scoring systems
- List of FIM World Championship points scoring systems
