= List of NASCAR points scoring systems =

This is a list of points scoring systems used to determine the outcome of the NASCAR Championships since 1949. The Championships are awarded each year to the driver who accumulate the most championship points over the course of the Championship season.

== Determined by money ==
=== 1949–1951 ===
- Points based on amount of prize money paid.
- Points scale pays to the top 14, with occasional small amounts of points below 14th on an inconsistent basis. 1st place is worth 50 for every $1,000, or 25 every $500. Half points are common.
- Reported prize money never quite exactly matches: i.e. the first three races in 1949 are all listed as $5,000, but one pays 250 to win, one is 225, another is 200.
- Most races are 200 points, but the Southern 500 is worth $25,000 and has a large impact on the final standings.

| Prize money | 1st | 2nd | 3rd | 4th | 5th | 6th | 7th | 8th | 9th | 10th | 11th | 12th | 13th | 14th |
|---|---|---|---|---|---|---|---|---|---|---|---|---|---|---|
| $500 | 25 | 22.5 | 20 | 17.5 | 15 | 12.5 | 10 | 7.5 | 5 | 2.5 | 2 | 1.5 | 1 | .5 |
| $1,000 | 50 | 45 | 40 | 35 | 30 | 25 | 20 | 15 | 10 | 5 | 4 | 3 | 2 | 1 |
| $4,000 | 200 | 180 | 160 | 140 | 120 | 100 | 80 | 60 | 40 | 20 | 16 | 12 | 8 | 4 |
| $6,000 | 300 | 270 | 240 | 210 | 180 | 150 | 120 | 90 | 60 | 30 | 24 | 18 | 12 | 6 |
| $25,000 | 1250 | 1125 | 1000 | 875 | 750 | 625 | 500 | 375 | 250 | 125 | 100 | 75 | 50 | 25 |

=== 1952–1967 ===
The scale changes to spread out evenly across the top 25, and half points are eliminated. Prize money is usually rounded to the nearest thousand: i.e. a race paying $3,950 would count as 200 points.

| Prize money | 1st | 2nd | 3rd | 4th | 5th | 6th | 7th | 8th | 9th | 10th | 11th | 12th | 13th | 14th | 15th | 16th | 17th | 18th | 19th | 20th | 21st | 22nd | 23rd | 24th | 25th+ |
|---|---|---|---|---|---|---|---|---|---|---|---|---|---|---|---|---|---|---|---|---|---|---|---|---|---|
| $4000 | 200 | 192 | 184 | 176 | 168 | 160 | 152 | 144 | 136 | 128 | 120 | 112 | 104 | 96 | 88 | 80 | 72 | 64 | 56 | 48 | 40 | 32 | 24 | 16 | 8 |
| $6000 | 400 | 384 | 368 | 352 | 336 | 320 | 304 | 288 | 272 | 256 | 240 | 224 | 208 | 192 | 176 | 160 | 144 | 128 | 112 | 96 | 80 | 64 | 48 | 32 | 16 |
| $10000 | 500 | 480 | 460 | 440 | 420 | 400 | 380 | 360 | 340 | 320 | 300 | 280 | 260 | 240 | 220 | 200 | 180 | 160 | 140 | 120 | 100 | 80 | 60 | 40 | 20 |
| $20000 | 1000 | 960 | 920 | 880 | 840 | 800 | 760 | 720 | 680 | 640 | 600 | 560 | 520 | 480 | 440 | 400 | 360 | 320 | 280 | 240 | 200 | 160 | 120 | 80 | 40 |
| $25000 | 1250 | 1200 | 1150 | 1100 | 1050 | 1000 | 950 | 900 | 850 | 800 | 750 | 700 | 650 | 600 | 550 | 500 | 450 | 400 | 350 | 300 | 250 | 200 | 150 | 100 | 50 |

=== 1974 ===
- Money (dollars) winnings from track purses (qualifying and contingency awards did not count), multiplied by the number of races started.
- The resulting figure divided by 1,000 determined the number of points earned.

== Determined by mileage ==
=== 1968–1971 ===
- Instead of using money, the championship points now determined by the length of the race.
- There was no special award for race winner, a constant gap of points was used between all ranks.

| Event Length | 1st | 2nd | 3rd | 4th | 5th | 6th | 7th | 8th | 9th | 10th | 11th | 12th | 13th | 14th | 15th | 16th | 17th | 18th | 19th | 20th | 21st | 22nd | 23rd | 24th | 25th | 26th | 27th | 28th | 29th | 30th | 31st | 32nd | 33rd | 34th | 35th | 36th | 37th | 38th | 39th | 40th | 41st | 42nd | 43rd | 44th | 45th | 46th | 47th | 48th | 49th | 50th |
|---|---|---|---|---|---|---|---|---|---|---|---|---|---|---|---|---|---|---|---|---|---|---|---|---|---|---|---|---|---|---|---|---|---|---|---|---|---|---|---|---|---|---|---|---|---|---|---|---|---|---|
| < 250 miles | 50 | 49 | 48 | 47 | 46 | 45 | 44 | 43 | 42 | 41 | 40 | 39 | 38 | 37 | 36 | 35 | 34 | 33 | 32 | 31 | 30 | 29 | 28 | 27 | 26 | 25 | 24 | 23 | 22 | 21 | 20 | 19 | 18 | 17 | 16 | 15 | 14 | 13 | 12 | 11 | 10 | 9 | 8 | 7 | 6 | 5 | 4 | 3 | 2 | 1 |
| 250–399 miles | 100 | 98 | 96 | 94 | 92 | 90 | 88 | 86 | 84 | 82 | 80 | 78 | 76 | 74 | 72 | 70 | 68 | 66 | 64 | 62 | 60 | 58 | 56 | 54 | 52 | 50 | 48 | 46 | 44 | 42 | 40 | 38 | 36 | 34 | 32 | 30 | 28 | 26 | 24 | 22 | 20 | 18 | 16 | 14 | 12 | 10 | 8 | 6 | 4 | 2 |
| > 399 miles | 150 | 147 | 144 | 141 | 138 | 135 | 132 | 129 | 126 | 123 | 120 | 117 | 114 | 111 | 108 | 105 | 102 | 99 | 96 | 93 | 90 | 87 | 84 | 81 | 78 | 75 | 72 | 69 | 66 | 63 | 60 | 57 | 54 | 51 | 48 | 45 | 42 | 39 | 36 | 33 | 30 | 27 | 24 | 21 | 18 | 15 | 12 | 9 | 6 | 3 |

=== 1972–1973 ===
Two different scoring systems were combined between 1972 and 1973. A points system for rank in the race and another point system for points based on the length of the race and the distance covered by the driver. For Example: The winner of the Daytona 500 in 1972 received a total of 350 points, 100 points for first place and an additional 250 points (1.25 points per lap * 200 laps) for race distance completed.

Rank points were awarded to the top 50 placing drivers in every race, using the following structure:

| Season | 1st | 2nd | 3rd | 4th | 5th | 6th | 7th | 8th | 9th | 10th | 11th | 12th | 13th | 14th | 15th | 16th | 17th | 18th | 19th | 20th | 21st | 22nd | 23rd | 24th | 25th | 26th | 27th | 28th | 29th | 30th | 31st | 32nd | 33rd | 34th | 35th | 36th | 37th | 38th | 39th | 40th | 41st | 42nd | 43rd | 44th | 45th | 46th | 47th | 48th | 49th | 50th |
| 1972 | 100 | 98 | 96 | 94 | 92 | 90 | 88 | 86 | 84 | 82 | 80 | 78 | 76 | 74 | 72 | 70 | 68 | 66 | 64 | 62 | 60 | 58 | 56 | 54 | 52 | 50 | 48 | 46 | 44 | 42 | 40 | 38 | 36 | 34 | 32 | 30 | 28 | 26 | 24 | 22 | 20 | 18 | 16 | 14 | 12 | 10 | 8 | 6 | 4 | 2 |
| 1973 | 125 | 98 | 96 | 94 | 92 | 90 | 88 | 86 | 84 | 82 | 80 | 78 | 76 | 74 | 72 | 70 | 68 | 66 | 64 | 62 | 60 | 58 | 56 | 54 | 52 | 50 | 48 | 46 | 44 | 42 | 40 | 38 | 36 | 34 | 32 | 30 | 28 | 26 | 24 | 22 | 20 | 18 | 16 | 14 | 12 | 10 | 8 | 6 | 4 | 2 |

Additionally, points for laps completed were awarded per the following schedule:

| Track lap distance | Points per number of laps completed |
|---|---|
| < 1 mile | 0.25 |
| 1 mile | 0.50 |
| 1.3 miles | 0.70 |
| 1.5 miles | 0.75 |
| 2 miles | 1.00 |
| 2.5 miles | 1.25 |

== Equal points per race ==
=== 1975–2010 ===
- In the 1975 season, a new scoring system was introduced, created by Bob Latford. Equal points are awarded in all races, regardless of their length or purse.
- Between rank 1 and 6, starting with 175 to the winner, there were 5 points gaps, between rank 6 and 11 were 4 points gaps and below rank 11 were 3 points gaps respectively.
- In the point scoring system there were points down to 54th place. These were not all awarded to drivers (drivers points were only awarded to drivers who qualified for a race, so depending on the race and year anywhere from 30-something up to 43 drivers might score points). Points were also awarded to owners, and these were awarded in order of qualifying time to cars which did not qualify for a race (e.g. if 43 cars qualify, and 3 DNQ, those 3 cars would get 40, 37, and 34 points). Owner points were used to determine provisional starting positions, which is the starting order when qualifying is rained out, etc.
- Along with the points based on the finishing position, a driver who leads at least one lap in a race would be credited 5 bonus points. Along with the 5 bonus points, only one driver in a race would receive an additional 5 bonus points for leading the most laps, so the driver who led the most would receive 10 bonus points altogether.
- In 2004 NASCAR introduced a new playoff format, but still using the old points scoring scheme.
- In 2004, 1st place was increased 5 points to 180, and another 5 points in 2007, to 185. So the gap between 1st and 2nd was extended to 10 and then to 15 points respectively.

| Year | 1st | 2nd | 3rd | 4th | 5th | 6th | 7th | 8th | 9th | 10th | 11th | 12th | 13th | 14th | 15th | 16th | 17th | 18th | 19th | 20th | 21st | 22nd | 23rd | 24th | 25th | 26th | 27th | 28th | 29th | 30th | 31st | 32nd | 33rd | 34th | 35th | 36th | 37th | 38th | 39th | 40th | 41st | 42nd | 43rd | 44th | 45th | 46th | 47th | 48th | 49th | 50th | 51st | 52nd | 53rd | 54th | Lead a Lap | Lead the Most Laps |
|---|---|---|---|---|---|---|---|---|---|---|---|---|---|---|---|---|---|---|---|---|---|---|---|---|---|---|---|---|---|---|---|---|---|---|---|---|---|---|---|---|---|---|---|---|---|---|---|---|---|---|---|---|---|---|---|---|
| 1975–2003 | 175 | 170 | 165 | 160 | 155 | 150 | 146 | 142 | 138 | 134 | 130 | 127 | 124 | 121 | 118 | 115 | 112 | 109 | 106 | 103 | 100 | 97 | 94 | 91 | 88 | 85 | 82 | 79 | 76 | 73 | 70 | 67 | 64 | 61 | 58 | 55 | 52 | 49 | 46 | 43 | 40 | 37 | 34 | 31 | 28 | 25 | 20 | 15 | 10 | 8 | 6 | 4 | 2 | 1 | 5 | 5 |
| 2004–2006 | 180 | 170 | 165 | 160 | 155 | 150 | 146 | 142 | 138 | 134 | 130 | 127 | 124 | 121 | 118 | 115 | 112 | 109 | 106 | 103 | 100 | 97 | 94 | 91 | 88 | 85 | 82 | 79 | 76 | 73 | 70 | 67 | 64 | 61 | 58 | 55 | 52 | 49 | 46 | 43 | 40 | 37 | 34 | 31 | 28 | 25 | 20 | 15 | 10 | 8 | 6 | 4 | 2 | 1 | 5 | 5 |
| 2007–2010 | 185 | 170 | 165 | 160 | 155 | 150 | 146 | 142 | 138 | 134 | 130 | 127 | 124 | 121 | 118 | 115 | 112 | 109 | 106 | 103 | 100 | 97 | 94 | 91 | 88 | 85 | 82 | 79 | 76 | 73 | 70 | 67 | 64 | 61 | 58 | 55 | 52 | 49 | 46 | 43 | 40 | 37 | 34 | 31 | 28 | 25 | 20 | 15 | 10 | 8 | 6 | 4 | 2 | 1 | 5 | 5 |

=== 2011–2015 ===
- In 2010, a new scoring system for 2011 was developed. Equal points are awarded in all races, regardless of their length.
- In contrast to the previous point system, there are only steps of 1 point between all ranks, beginning with 1 point for rank 43.
- A driver receives 1 point for leading a lap.
- The winner automatically receives an additional 3-point bonus for winning a race and the 1 point bonus for leading the final lap. A driver receives 47 points at minimum for winning a race. If a driver leads the most laps and wins, they receive a maximum number of 48 points.
- In 2014 and 2015, bonus points for laps led and for the win were not awarded to Championship 4 drivers in the season finale, which was the final round of the elimination-style Chase for the Cup format.
- As a "Buschwhacking" prevention measure, drivers must declare which series they will earn championship points and cannot earn points in other series than the one that they have declared. This rule does not apply for owners, as their drivers' finishing positions will score owner points, regardless of the driver being eligible for points in that series or not. Ineligible drivers do not score any driver points in a race, but the owner will still score points.

| 1st | 2nd | 3rd | 4th | 5th | 6th | 7th | 8th | 9th | 10th | 11th | 12th | 13th | 14th | 15th | 16th | 17th | 18th | 19th | 20th | 21st | 22nd | 23rd | 24th | 25th | 26th | 27th | 28th | 29th | 30th | 31st | 32nd | 33rd | 34th | 35th | 36th | 37th | 38th | 39th | 40th | 41st | 42nd | 43rd | Lead a Lap | Lead the Most Laps |
|---|---|---|---|---|---|---|---|---|---|---|---|---|---|---|---|---|---|---|---|---|---|---|---|---|---|---|---|---|---|---|---|---|---|---|---|---|---|---|---|---|---|---|---|---|
| 43 (+3) | 42 | 41 | 40 | 39 | 38 | 37 | 36 | 35 | 34 | 33 | 32 | 31 | 30 | 29 | 28 | 27 | 26 | 25 | 24 | 23 | 22 | 21 | 20 | 19 | 18 | 17 | 16 | 15 | 14 | 13 | 12 | 11 | 10 | 9 | 8 | 7 | 6 | 5 | 4 | 3 | 2 | 1 | 1 | 1 |

=== 2016 ===
- In 2016, the number of cars was reduced to 40 per race, so the points scoring system was modified to reflect this change.
- A driver receives 1 point for leading a lap.
- The winner automatically receives the 3 points bonus for winning the race and the 1 point bonus for leading the final lap. The winner would normally receive 44 points, with a maximum point total of 45 if the driver led the most laps.
- Championship 4 drivers do not earn bonus points in the championship-deciding season finale. Jimmie Johnson won the 2016 Ford EcoBoost 400 to clinch his seventh championship, and earned only 40 points as a result. Race runner-up Kyle Larson, who was not one of the Championship 4, received 41 points after two point bonuses for leading a lap and leading the most laps of the race.

| 1st | 2nd | 3rd | 4th | 5th | 6th | 7th | 8th | 9th | 10th | 11th | 12th | 13th | 14th | 15th | 16th | 17th | 18th | 19th | 20th | 21st | 22nd | 23rd | 24th | 25th | 26th | 27th | 28th | 29th | 30th | 31st | 32nd | 33rd | 34th | 35th | 36th | 37th | 38th | 39th | 40th | Lead a Lap | Lead the most Laps |
|---|---|---|---|---|---|---|---|---|---|---|---|---|---|---|---|---|---|---|---|---|---|---|---|---|---|---|---|---|---|---|---|---|---|---|---|---|---|---|---|---|---|
| 40 (+3) | 39 | 38 | 37 | 36 | 35 | 34 | 33 | 32 | 31 | 30 | 29 | 28 | 27 | 26 | 25 | 24 | 23 | 22 | 21 | 20 | 19 | 18 | 17 | 16 | 15 | 14 | 13 | 12 | 11 | 10 | 9 | 8 | 7 | 6 | 5 | 4 | 3 | 2 | 1 | 1 | 1 |

== Stage points added ==
=== 2017–2019 ===
For all series in NASCAR, there is both a drivers and an owners championship, with the system based on finishing positions equal in both championships. Since 2011 in the National Series competition and 2012 in the Regional Series competition, the points system has been a one-point per position system except between the winner and second-place finisher, where the difference is five points. In all series except the Whelen All-American Series, a driver who leads a lap during the race will earn one bonus point (the only place leading counts is at the start/finish line). Under NASCAR's charter system beginning in 2016, the last place finisher will earn 1 point (previously the last place driver earned 1 point for the 40-car field has been used).

A new NASCAR Point System was announced for the 2017 season:

For the first time since 1971, the Duel qualifying races prior to the Daytona 500 became points paying races with the top-10 finishers earning points.

In the NASCAR Craftsman Truck Series, there are only 32 competitors, so the last-place driver receives five points. Teams must submit an entry form to NASCAR 13 days prior to the event with the race's entry fee, or they are deemed ineligible for points.

Most races are now divided into 3 "stages" with additional points available for position at the end of the first 2 stages and finishing points for the final stage. Stage 1 is roughly the first quarter of the race distance, Stage 2 is roughly the 2nd quarter and Stage 3 is roughly the last half of the race. Drivers can earn race points through their performances in Stage 1 and 2. Drivers who are running first through 10th at the conclusion of Stage 1 and/or Stage 2 will receive points according to the table below.

Points are awarded to the drivers in the first two stages:

| Position | 1 | 2 | 3 | 4 | 5 | 6 | 7 | 8 | 9 | 10 | S1WIN | S2WIN | S3WIN (Note: Only for Coca-Cola 600) |
|---|---|---|---|---|---|---|---|---|---|---|---|---|---|
| NCS | 10 | 9 | 8 | 7 | 6 | 5 | 4 | 3 | 2 | 1 | 1 | 1 | 1 |
| NXS | 10 | 9 | 8 | 7 | 6 | 5 | 4 | 3 | 2 | 1 | 1 | 1 | - |
| NCTS | 10 | 9 | 8 | 7 | 6 | 5 | 4 | 3 | 2 | 1 | 1 | 1 | - |

Notes

The only exception to the 3 stage race is for the NASCAR Cup Series's longest race, the Coca-Cola 600 which has 4 stages that are divided into 4 equal 100 lap quarters with points awarded for stage 3 position.

Points are awarded to drivers and owners in the three national series in the final stage:

| Position | 1 | 2 | 3 | 4 | 5 | 6 | 7 | 8 | 9 | 10 | 11 | 12 | 13 | 14 | 15 | 16 | 17 | 18 | 19 | 20 | 21 | 22 | 23 | 24 | 25 | 26 | 27 | 28 | 29 | 30 | 31 | 32 | 33 | 34 | 35 | 36 | 37 | 38 | 39 | 40 | LAP | PWIN |
|---|---|---|---|---|---|---|---|---|---|---|---|---|---|---|---|---|---|---|---|---|---|---|---|---|---|---|---|---|---|---|---|---|---|---|---|---|---|---|---|---|---|---|
| NCS | 40 | 35 | 34 | 33 | 32 | 31 | 30 | 29 | 28 | 27 | 26 | 25 | 24 | 23 | 22 | 21 | 20 | 19 | 18 | 17 | 16 | 15 | 14 | 13 | 12 | 11 | 10 | 9 | 8 | 7 | 6 | 5 | 4 | 3 | 2 | 1 | 1 | 1 | 1 | 1 | 1 | 5 |
| NXS | 40 | 35 | 34 | 33 | 32 | 31 | 30 | 29 | 28 | 27 | 26 | 25 | 24 | 23 | 22 | 21 | 20 | 19 | 18 | 17 | 16 | 15 | 14 | 13 | 12 | 11 | 10 | 9 | 8 | 7 | 6 | 5 | 4 | 3 | 2 | 1 | 1 | 1 | | | 1 | 5 |
| NCTS | 40 | 35 | 34 | 33 | 32 | 31 | 30 | 29 | 28 | 27 | 26 | 25 | 24 | 23 | 22 | 21 | 20 | 19 | 18 | 17 | 16 | 15 | 14 | 13 | 12 | 11 | 10 | 9 | 8 | 7 | 6 | 5 | 4 | 3 | 2 | 1 | | | | | 1 | 5 |

=== 2020–2024 ===
Following the suspension of the 2020 season due to the COVID-19 pandemic, NASCAR altered the field size for the Xfinity Series and Truck Series, allowing fields of up to 40 competitors after practice and qualifying sessions were removed from race weekends. The Xfinity Series followed the Cup series point format with drivers finishing between 37th and 40th scoring 1 point. The Truck Series awarded 5 points to drivers finishing between 33rd and 40th.

=== 2025 ===
On February 4, NASCAR announced there would be an additional point for the driver and owner who achieved the fastest lap in each race in the top 3 series. This is called the Xfinity Fastest Lap and the driver who earns the most throughout the season in their respective series will receive a donation to the charity of their choice.

=== 2026 ===
For 2026, 15 additional points for the winner were added. Playoff bonus points were dropped. NASCAR also added guardrails around the fastest lap point, preventing teams whose car has entered the garage from earning the point after they come back onto the track. They would still get the fastest lap bonus point if they set the lap before going to the garage. Points are awarded to drivers and owners in the three national series in the final stage:

| Position | 1 | 2 | 3 | 4 | 5 | 6 | 7 | 8 | 9 | 10 | 11 | 12 | 13 | 14 | 15 | 16 | 17 | 18 | 19 | 20 | 21 | 22 | 23 | 24 | 25 | 26 | 27 | 28 | 29 | 30 | 31 | 32 | 33 | 34 | 35 | 36 | 37 | 38 | 39 | 40 |
|---|---|---|---|---|---|---|---|---|---|---|---|---|---|---|---|---|---|---|---|---|---|---|---|---|---|---|---|---|---|---|---|---|---|---|---|---|---|---|---|---|
| NCS | 55 | 35 | 34 | 33 | 32 | 31 | 30 | 29 | 28 | 27 | 26 | 25 | 24 | 23 | 22 | 21 | 20 | 19 | 18 | 17 | 16 | 15 | 14 | 13 | 12 | 11 | 10 | 9 | 8 | 7 | 6 | 5 | 4 | 3 | 2 | 1 | 1 | 1 | 1 | 1 |
| NOAPS | 55 | 35 | 34 | 33 | 32 | 31 | 30 | 29 | 28 | 27 | 26 | 25 | 24 | 23 | 22 | 21 | 20 | 19 | 18 | 17 | 16 | 15 | 14 | 13 | 12 | 11 | 10 | 9 | 8 | 7 | 6 | 5 | 4 | 3 | 2 | 1 | 1 | 1 | | |
| NCTS | 55 | 35 | 34 | 33 | 32 | 31 | 30 | 29 | 28 | 27 | 26 | 25 | 24 | 23 | 22 | 21 | 20 | 19 | 18 | 17 | 16 | 15 | 14 | 13 | 12 | 11 | 10 | 9 | 8 | 7 | 6 | 5 | 4 | 3 | 2 | 1 | | | | |

== 2017–2025 Playoff rules ==
In NASCAR's top three national series, there is a playoff format contested over the final races of the season. When Sprint Nextel was the title sponsor of NASCAR's premiere series it was known as the Chase. Starting in 2017 it is simply known as the playoffs. 2025 was the last season with a playoff format. Starting with 2026 there are a new chase format without playoff bonus points and without elimination rounds.

=== Qualification ===
The top 16 drivers with the most wins over the first 26 races qualify for the Playoffs, provided they attempted to qualify for every race. A driver may be exempt from the requirement to start every race if he has to miss races because of injuries, is on family leave, or under extenuating circumstances by NASCAR.

If there are fewer than 16 different race winners in the first 26 races, the remaining positions will be determined by drivers highest in points standings. All ties will be broken by drivers' point standings.

Drivers who qualify for the playoffs will have their points reset to 2,000 points, along with one point for each stage won during the regular season, and five points for each race win. Also, more bonus points for Top-10 in points standings at the end of the regular season:

| Position | 1 | 2 | 3 | 4 | 5 | 6 | 7 | 8 | 9 | 10 |
|---|---|---|---|---|---|---|---|---|---|---|
| Additional playoff points | 15 | 10 | 8 | 7 | 6 | 5 | 4 | 3 | 2 | 1 |

=== Advancement model during the Playoffs ===
- The first three races of the Playoffs (27–29) will be known as the Round of 16, races 30–32 will be known as the Round of 12, races 33–35 will be the Round of 8, and race No. 36 will be the NASCAR Cup Series Championship.
- In the first two years of the Playoffs, the rounds were known as the Challenger, Contender, and Eliminator Round, but those names were dropped for 2016.
- The number of championship drivers in contention for the NASCAR Cup Series championship will decrease after every three Playoff races, from 16 to start; 12 after Playoff race 3; eight after Playoff race 6; and four after Playoff race 9.
- After the first cut (Race 29), the 12 drivers that remain will have their points reset at 3,000 at the start of Race 30. After the second cut (Race 32), the top eight drivers will have their points reset to 4,000 at the start of Race 33. After the third cut (Race 35), the top four drivers will have their points reset to 5,000 at the start of Race 36.
- Starting in 2017, stage wins earn 1 playoff point which will be added to each driver's total with a race win earning 5 playoff points. Further, the regular season champion will receive 15 bonus playoff points with, second place driver in regular season standings earning 10 playoff points, and the third place driver earning 8 playoff points, and each subsequent drivers in the top 10 earning a descending number of points with the tenth place driver in regular season standings earning 1 playoff point. These points will be added to each drivers total and carry through the first three rounds of the NASCAR Cup Series playoff and the first two rounds of the NASCAR Xfinity Series & NASCAR Camping World Truck Series playoffs.
- A win by a championship-eligible driver in any Playoff race automatically clinches the winning driver a spot in the next playoff round.
- The Xfinity Series Chase will only have 12 drivers and 3 rounds consisting of 7 total races. The Gander Outdoors Truck Series Playoffs will only have 10 drivers, with 2 drivers eliminated after the Round of 10 and 4 after the Round of 8.

=== Finishing fifth ===
- Drivers that miss the cut at the end of each elimination race will race for fifth place in the NASCAR Cup Series standings.
- After the first cut, eliminated drivers will keep their points after Race 29, and accumulate points for the remaining seven races, with points added to points as of Race 29.
- For subsequent cuts, the eliminated driver's base score reverts to the start of the Playoffs (Race 27), and points earned in each race (in Races 27–35) will be accumulated and added to the driver's base score.
- The driver highest in points of the 12 eliminated drivers at the end of the 36th race will finish fifth. Positions 5–16 will be determined by the driver's base score at the start of the Playoffs and all points accumulated in the final ten races.

=== Championship finale ===
The four drivers remaining in the playoffs are the Championship Four. They compete for the NASCAR Cup Championship at the 36th and final race of the season, currently held at Phoenix Raceway. Points are reset at 5,000 for all 4 drivers. The Championship Four drivers do not receive points for finishing position at the end of each stage. Only official finishing position alone will decide the champion, the highest finisher wins the championship. 2023 was the first year that the champion didn’t win the race itself.

== See also ==
- List of American Championship car racing points scoring systems
- List of Formula One World Championship points scoring systems
- List of FIM World Championship points scoring systems
