= List of Formula One points systems =

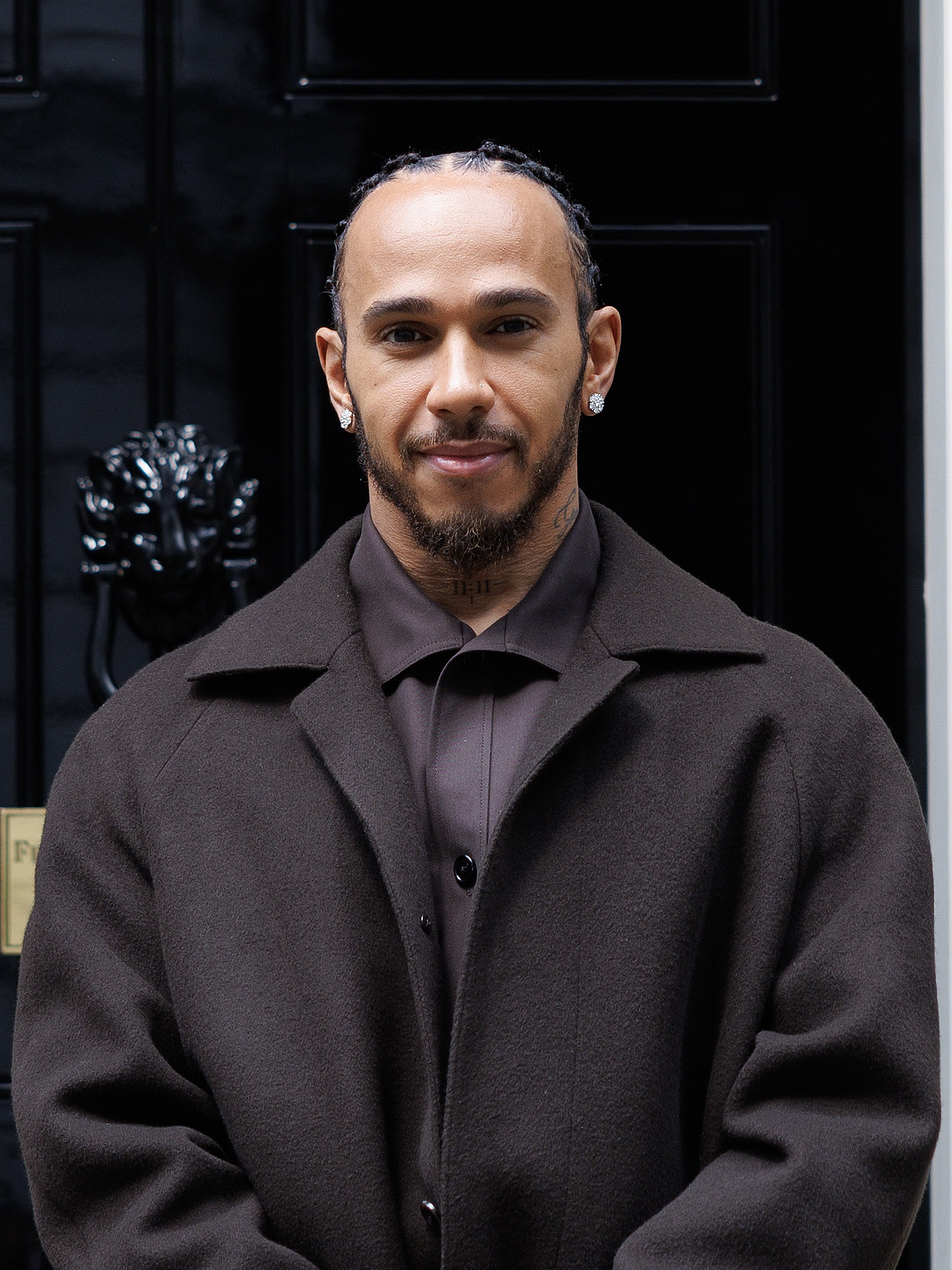
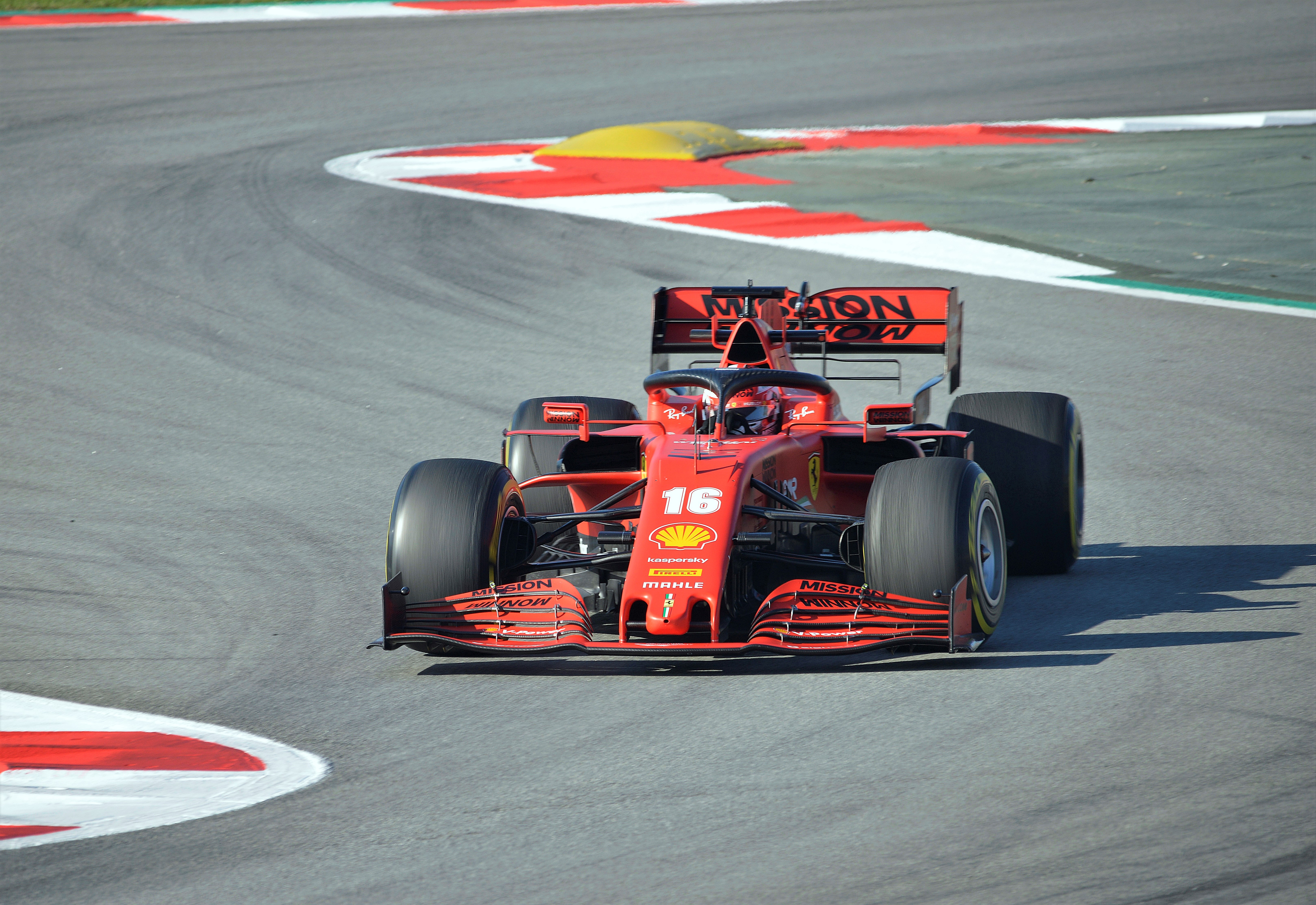
Lewis Hamilton (left) holds the record for the highest number of World Drivers' Championship points scored, and Scuderia Ferrari (right) maintains the record for the highest number of points attained in the World Constructors' Championship. However, the number of points awarded for identical results, as well as the number of races per season, have changed over the years, so comparison between drivers or teams cannot be done by points alone.

Formula One (F1) is the highest class of open-wheeled auto racing series administered by the Fédération Internationale de l'Automobile (FIA), motorsport's world governing body. The "formula" in the name alludes to a series of rules set by the FIA to which all participants and vehicles are required to conform. The F1 World Championship season consists of a series of races, known as Grands Prix, usually held on purpose-built circuits, and in a few cases on closed city streets. A points scoring system is used for each Grand Prix held over the course of the F1 season to determine the outcome of two annual championships, one for drivers (World Drivers' Championship) since 1950, and one for constructors (World Constructors' Championship) since 1958. Each driver accumulates championship points individually in the World Drivers' Championship and collectively for the team they compete for in the World Constructors' Championship. Both championships are formally awarded at the end-of-season FIA Prize Giving Ceremony to the driver and team with the most points.

As of the 2026 São Paulo Grand Prix, 358 drivers have scored Drivers' Championship points, and 74 out of 172 teams have scored Constructors' Championship points, in 1,169 World Championship races. Lewis Hamilton has the highest Drivers' Championship points total with 5279.5, Max Verstappen is second with 3723.5 and Sebastian Vettel is third with 3098. Scuderia Ferrari holds the record for the highest Constructors' Championship points total with 11232, Mercedes is second with 8801.5, and Red Bull Racing is third with 8703. Drivers received an equal points distribution share if they shared a car with another or set the same fastest lap as another between 1950 and 1957. Second drivers of teams who officially entered only one car were ineligible for points on two occasions involving three drivers.

== History ==
The points scoring has been changed several times throughout F1 history. Participants in every season until 1990 could only achieve Drivers' Championship points for their best-placed finishes in a specified maximum number of races. Up until 1979, most years saw only the highest-scoring participant in each Grand Prix for each constructor contributing points towards the Constructors' title. From 1950 to 1959, the top five finishers of each race plus the fastest lap setter tallied points. The format was expanded to include the first six finishers of each event between 1960 and 2002 but with no point for fastest lap. In 2003, the FIA revised the structure to the top eight finishers of each race. The FIA extended the system again to include the first ten Grand Prix finishers in 2010. Each Grand Prix winner tallied 8 points from 1950 to 1960, 9 from 1961 to 1990, 10 between 1991 and 2009, and 25 since 2010.

Half points were awarded for six Grands Prix that were red-flagged before a certain threshold in a race progression was reached (at different times being either 60% or 75% of the scheduled race distance); starting from around 1977 to 1980 until the end of the 2021 season, no points were able to be accumulated should a race conclude early with the leader having completed two or fewer laps. Following the 2021 Belgian Grand Prix in which half points were awarded to the first ten finishers despite no racing laps being completed, the standards by which a driver can tally championship points should a Grand Prix be suspended before full distance is covered and not be restarted, were changed to a gradual scale system beginning in 2022. No points are awarded unless the race leader completes two or more racing laps without the intervention of a safety car or virtual safety car. Only the top five finishers are eligible for championship points if the race leader completes more than two racing laps but covers less than 25% of the race distance. That switches to the top nine places should the race leader complete between 25% and 50% of race distance. If the race leader covers between 50% and 75% of race distance then participants finishing in the top ten positions tally points. Full championship points are tallied should the race leader complete 75% or more of the scheduled race distance. Following initial confusion over how points were awarded at the 2022 Japanese Grand Prix, the FIA clarified the drivers are also eligible for full points if the race finishes under green flag conditions regardless of the percentage of the scheduled race distance that has been covered. In 2023, the FIA clarified that shortened races would be subject to the gradual scale system "if the race distance from the start signal to the end-of-session signal is less than the scheduled race distance."

Sprint qualifying was introduced in 2021 to set the starting order at three Grands Prix that season and the top three finishers of each of these mini-races received points. The first eight drivers were awarded points in three sprint races in 2022, and in six sprint races in 2023.

The fastest lap bonus point was re-introduced in 2019, however only drivers and constructors who finished in the top ten were eligible to score the point. From 2022, the fastest lap point was only awarded if 50% or more of the scheduled race distance was completed. The FIA abolished the fastest lap point rule for the 2025 season onwards. Unlike various other motor racing series, F1 has never awarded bonus points to drivers for leading the most laps (e.g., the IndyCar Series) or qualifying on pole position (e.g., the F1 feeder series, such as Formula 2 and Formula 3).

== Points scoring systems ==
List of Formula One World Championship points scoring systems used throughout history
Seasons	1st	2nd	3rd	4th	5th	6th	7th	8th	9th	10th	Fastest lap	Towards WDC	Towards WCC	Notes
1950–1953	8	6	4	3	2	–	–	–	–	–	1	4	N/A	(Note: The World Constructors' Championship was not awarded from 1950 to 1957.) (Note: Points for shared drives were shared equally between the drivers, regardless of how many laps each driver completed.)
1954	8	6	4	3	2	–	–	–	–	–	1	5	N/A	(Note: Points were shared equally between drivers who set the same fastest lap time (an extreme example of which happened in the 1954 British Grand Prix where seven drivers set the same fastest lap time, and each received 1/7 of a point).)
1955	8	6	4	3	2	–	–	–	–	–	1	5	N/A	(Note: Points for shared drives were shared equally between the drivers, even if they drove more than one points-scoring car (e.g. 1955 Argentine Grand Prix), unless one driver was deemed to have completed "insufficient distance" (e.g. 1957 British Grand Prix).)
1956–1957	8	6	4	3	2	–	–	–	–	–	1	5	N/A	(Note: Drivers who shared more than one car in a race only received points for their highest finish (e.g. 1956 Monaco Grand Prix).) (Note: Formula 2 cars raced with Formula One cars in the following Grands Prix, but were ineligible for World Championship points: 1957 German Grand Prix; 1958 German Grand Prix; 1958 Moroccan Grand Prix; 1966 German Grand Prix; 1967 German Grand Prix; 1969 German Grand Prix)
1958	8	6	4	3	2	–	–	–	–	–	1	6		(Note: Points were no longer awarded for shared race drives (e.g. 1958 Italian Grand Prix, 1960 Argentine Grand Prix).) (Note: Only the points of the highest-scoring driver for each constructor at each race (including privateer entries) were counted towards the Constructors' Championship.) (Note: The point for fastest lap was only awarded to drivers, not constructors.) (Note: The points in the Indianapolis 500 were only awarded only to drivers and not constructors.)
1959	8	6	4	3	2	–	–	–	–	–	1	5		
1960	8	6	4	3	2	1	–	–	–	–	–	6		
1961	9 (D)	6	4	3	2	1	–	–	–	–	–	5		(Note: Points were awarded on a 9–6–4–3–2–1 basis for the 1961 Drivers' title, and on an 8–6–4–3–2–1 basis for the 1961 Constructors' title.)
1961	8 (C)	6	4	3	2	1	–	–	–	–	–	5		(Note: Points were awarded on a 9–6–4–3–2–1 basis for the 1961 Drivers' title, and on an 8–6–4–3–2–1 basis for the 1961 Constructors' title.)
1962	9	6	4	3	2	1	–	–	–	–	–	5		
1963–1965	9	6	4	3	2	1	–	–	–	–	–	6		
1966	9	6	4	3	2	1	–	–	–	–	–	5		(Note: Drivers who were not classified (i.e. did not complete a specified amount of race distance) did not score points, even if they finished in the top six places.)
1967	9	6	4	3	2	1	–	–	–	–	–	9 (5 from first 6, 4 from last 5)		(Note: Drivers who were not classified (i.e. did not complete a specified amount of race distance) did not score points, even if they finished in the top six places.)
1968	9	6	4	3	2	1	–	–	–	–	–	10 (5 each from first and last 6)		
1969	9	6	4	3	2	1	–	–	–	–	–	9 (5 from first 6, 4 from last 5)		
1970	9	6	4	3	2	1	–	–	–	–	–	11 (6 from first 7, 5 from last 6)		
1971	9	6	4	3	2	1	–	–	–	–	–	9 (5 from first 6, 4 from last 5)		
1972	9	6	4	3	2	1	–	–	–	–	–	10 (5 each from first and last 6)		
1973–1974	9	6	4	3	2	1	–	–	–	–	–	13 (7 from first 8, 6 from last 7)		
1975	9	6	4	3	2	1	–	–	–	–	–	12 (6 each from first and last 7)		
1976	9	6	4	3	2	1	–	–	–	–	–	14 (7 each from first and last 8)		
1977	9	6	4	3	2	1	–	–	–	–	–	15 (8 from first 9, 7 from last 8)		
1978	9	6	4	3	2	1	–	–	–	–	–	14 (7 each from first and last 8)		
1979	9	6	4	3	2	1	–	–	–	–	–	8 (4 from first 7, 4 from last 8)	All	–
1980	9	6	4	3	2	1	–	–	–	–	–	10 (5 each from first and last 7)	All	–
1981	9	6	4	3	2	1	–	–	–	–	–	10	All	(Note: Second drivers of teams that officially entered only one car were not eligible for points. This affected Jo Gartner (Osella) and Gerhard Berger (ATS) who finished fifth and sixth at the 1984 Italian Grand Prix, and Yannick Dalmas (Larrousse) who finished fifth at the 1987 Australian Grand Prix. Their points were not redistributed.)
1982–1990	9	6	4	3	2	1	–	–	–	–	–	11	All	(Note: Second drivers of teams that officially entered only one car were not eligible for points. This affected Jo Gartner (Osella) and Gerhard Berger (ATS) who finished fifth and sixth at the 1984 Italian Grand Prix, and Yannick Dalmas (Larrousse) who finished fifth at the 1987 Australian Grand Prix. Their points were not redistributed.)
1991–2002	10	6	4	3	2	1	–	–	–	–	–	All		–
2003–2009	10	8	6	5	4	3	2	1	–	–	–	All		–
2010–2018	25	18	15	12	10	8	6	4	2	1	–	All		(Note: In 2014, double points were awarded in the last race of the season.)
2019–2024	25	18	15	12	10	8	6	4	2	1	1	All		(Note: The point for fastest lap was only awarded if the driver was classified in the top 10 in the race.) (Note: No official fastest lap was awarded at the 2021 Belgian Grand Prix.)
2025 onwards	25	18	15	12	10	8	6	4	2	1	–	All		–

=== Special cases ===
==== Sprint races ====
Since 2021, select events have held an additional sprint race, which has awarded points as follows:

Sprint qualifying and the sprints
Seasons	1st	2nd	3rd	4th	5th	6th	7th	8th
2021	3	2	1	–	–	–	–	–
2022 onwards	8	7	6	5	4	3	2	1

==== Shortened races ====
Shortened race points criteria
Seasons	Race length completed	1st	2nd	3rd	4th	5th	6th	7th	8th	9th	10th	Fastest lap	Notes
1975–1976	Less than 30%	–										–	(Note: The first race for which half-points were awarded was the 1975 Spanish Grand Prix.) (Note: The requirement to complete two laps is believed to have been implemented between 1977 and 1980.)
1975–1976	Between 30% and 60%	Half										–	(Note: The first race for which half-points were awarded was the 1975 Spanish Grand Prix.) (Note: The requirement to complete two laps is believed to have been implemented between 1977 and 1980.)
1975–1976	Between 60% and 100%	Full										–	(Note: The first race for which half-points were awarded was the 1975 Spanish Grand Prix.) (Note: The requirement to complete two laps is believed to have been implemented between 1977 and 1980.)
1980–2021	Less than two laps	–										–	(Note: The regulation regarding half-points in the case of exactly two laps being completed was slightly amended in 2016; no race was affected by this amendment.)
1980–2021	Between two laps and 75%	Half										–	(Note: The regulation regarding half-points in the case of exactly two laps being completed was slightly amended in 2016; no race was affected by this amendment.)
1980–2021	75% – 100%	Full										1 (Note: Points were only awarded from 2019 to 2024.)	(Note: The regulation regarding half-points in the case of exactly two laps being completed was slightly amended in 2016; no race was affected by this amendment.)
2022 onwards	Less than two full racing laps	–										–	(Note: In 2022, if a Grand Prix was restarted but was subsequently shortened due to reaching the regulations-imposed time limit – as had happened at the 2022 Japanese Grand Prix – then full points were awarded.) (Note: Starting in 2023, the number of points awarded is based on percentage of distance covered regardless of whether a race is ended under a red flag, or is restarted and then subsequently shortened due to reaching the regulations-imposed time limit. This change to the regulations was made in order to correct a drafting error in the 2022 regulations, which saw full points unexpectedly awarded at the 2022 Japanese Grand Prix, which only saw 28 laps completed before the time limit expired.)
2022 onwards	Between two full racing laps and 25%	6	4	3	2	1	–	–	–	–	–	–	
2022 onwards	Between 25% and 50%	13	10	8	6	5	4	3	2	1	–	–	
2022 onwards	Between 50% and 75%	19	14	12	10	8	6	4	3	2	1	1	
2022 onwards	Between 75% and 100%	Full										1	

== Records and achievements ==
Jim Clark is the only driver to score maximum points in a season, claiming 54 points in both 1963 and 1965, when only the best six results counted towards the championship—Clark won seven and six Grands Prix, respectively. More recently, Michael Schumacher finished on the podium in every race in the 2002 season, earning 144 of a possible 170 points (84.70%). Max Verstappen set numerous points-related records in his 2023 campaign, scoring a record 575 of 620 available (92.74%), which eclipsed his previous numerical record of 454 from 2022. The most dominant World Constructors' Champion in recent times was McLaren in 1988, scoring 199 of a maximum 240 points and finishing 134 points ahead of its nearest rival. In 2002, Ferrari scored 221 points, as many as all the other teams combined.

Robert Kubica has the longest time between two successive points-scoring results: 8 years and 256 days (between the 2010 Abu Dhabi Grand Prix and the 2019 German Grand Prix). Fernando Alonso has the longest time between his first and last points-scoring results: he scored his first points in the 2003 Australian Grand Prix and his most recent at the 2026 Bahrain Grand Prix, a span of 23 years, 6 months, and 25 days. Hamilton holds the record for most consecutive points-scoring results at 48 Grands Prix: from the 2018 British Grand Prix to the 2020 Bahrain Grand Prix. Max Verstappen is the youngest driver to score a championship point; he finished seventh at the 2015 Malaysian Grand Prix when he was 17 years and 180 days old. Philippe Étancelin is the oldest driver to score a championship point; he was 53 years and 249 days old when he finished fifth at the 1950 Italian Grand Prix.

== See also ==
- List of American Championship car racing points scoring systems
- List of NASCAR points scoring systems
- List of FIM World Championship points scoring systems

== Bibliography ==
- Guichard, Ami; Wilkins, Gordon (1961). Automobile Year 1961/62. Lausanne, Switzerland: Edita S.A. ISBN 978-88-95234-53-3.
- Hayhoe, David (1989). Kimberley Grand Prix Data Book: Formula 1 Racing Facts and Figures 1950 to Date. Sparkford, England: Haynes Publishing. ISBN 0-946132-63-1 – via Open Library.
- Hughes, Mark; Tremayne, David (2002). The Concise Encyclopedia of Formula 1. Bath, England: Parragon. ISBN 0-75258-766-8 – via Open Library.
- Jones, Bruce (2015). World Formula 1 Records 2016 (Fifth ed.). London, England: SevenOaks. ISBN 978-1-78177-268-3.
- Arron, Simon; Dodgins, Tony (2022). Formula One: The Pinnacle: The Pivotal Events That Made Formula 1 Motorsport's Greatest Series. Brighton, England: Ivy Press. ISBN 978-0-7112-7420-4.
