= List of FIM World Championship points scoring systems =

This is a list of points scoring systems used to determine the outcome of the annual FIM Motorcycle Grand Prix World Championship and Constructors' Championship since 1949. The championship titles are awarded to the competitor and constructor who accumulate the most championship points over the course of the championship season.

== Points scoring systems ==
List of FIM World Championship points scoring systems used throughout history
Seasons	1st	2nd	3rd	4th	5th	6th	7th	8th	9th	10th	11th	12th	13th	14th	15th	Fastest lap	Best results counted (500cc or MotoGP class)	Notes
1949	10	8	7	6	5	–	–	–	–	–	–	–	–	–	–	1	3	
1950	8	6	4	3	2	1	–	–	–	–	–	–	–	–	–	–	4	
1951–1955	8	6	4	3	2	1	–	–	–	–	–	–	–	–	–	–	5	
1956–1960	8	6	4	3	2	1	–	–	–	–	–	–	–	–	–	–	4	
1961	8	6	4	3	2	1	–	–	–	–	–	–	–	–	–	–	6	
1962–1964	8	6	4	3	2	1	–	–	–	–	–	–	–	–	–	–	5	
1965	8	6	4	3	2	1	–	–	–	–	–	–	–	–	–	–	6	
1966	8	6	4	3	2	1	–	–	–	–	–	–	–	–	–	–	5	
1967–1968	8	6	4	3	2	1	–	–	–	–	–	–	–	–	–	–	6	
1969	15	12	10	8	6	5	4	3	2	1	–	–	–	–	–	–	7	
1970–1971	15	12	10	8	6	5	4	3	2	1	–	–	–	–	–	–	6	
1972	15	12	10	8	6	5	4	3	2	1	–	–	–	–	–	–	7	
1973–1975	15	12	10	8	6	5	4	3	2	1	–	–	–	–	–	–	6	
1976	15	12	10	8	6	5	4	3	2	1	–	–	–	–	–	–	6 (3 from first 5, 3 from last 5)	
1977–1987	15	12	10	8	6	5	4	3	2	1	–	–	–	–	–	–	All	
1988–1991	20	17	15	13	11	10	9	8	7	6	5	4	3	2	1	–	All	
1992	20	15	12	10	8	6	4	3	2	1	–	–	–	–	–	–	All	
1993–present	25	20	16	13	11	10	9	8	7	6	5	4	3	2	1	–	All	

=== Special cases ===
Sprints
Seasons	1st	2nd	3rd	4th	5th	6th	7th	8th	9th	Notes
2023–present	12	9	7	6	5	4	3	2	1	(Note: Only the MotoGP class has sprints starting in 2023.)

== See also ==
- List of Formula One World Championship points scoring systems
- List of American Championship car racing points scoring systems
- List of NASCAR points scoring systems
