= Marc VDS Racing Team =

Motorcycle racing team

- 2026 name: ELF Marc VDS Racing Team
- Base: Gosselies, Belgium
- Principal: Joan Olivé
- Rider(s): Moto2: 44. Arón Canet; 53. Deniz Öncü; WSBK: 14. Sam Lowes
- Rider coach: Leon Camier
- Motorcycle: Moto2: Boscoscuro B-26; WSBK: Ducati Panigale V4 R
- Tyres: Moto2: Pirelli; WSBK: Pirelli
- Riders' Championships: Moto2: 2014: Tito Rabat; 2017: Franco Morbidelli; 2019: Álex Márquez
- Teams' Championships: Moto2: 2014; 2017

Marc VDS Racing Team is a motorcycle racing team founded by Belgian owner Marc-Oswald van der Straten-Ponthoz, descendant of the founder of the Stella Artois brewery.

The team competes in motorcycle racing in the Moto2 World Championship under the name ELF Marc VDS Racing Team, and from 2024 in the Superbike World Championship. The team has previously competed in the MotoGP and MotoE classes. It also previously competed in many auto racing championships, particularly in grand touring classes - namely the FIA GT1 World Championship, the Blancpain Endurance Series, and the European Le Mans Series - as well as the NASCAR Whelen Euro Series. They have also previously contested in rallying at various rally raid events, such as the Dakar Rally.

== History ==
=== Mixed motorsport era ===
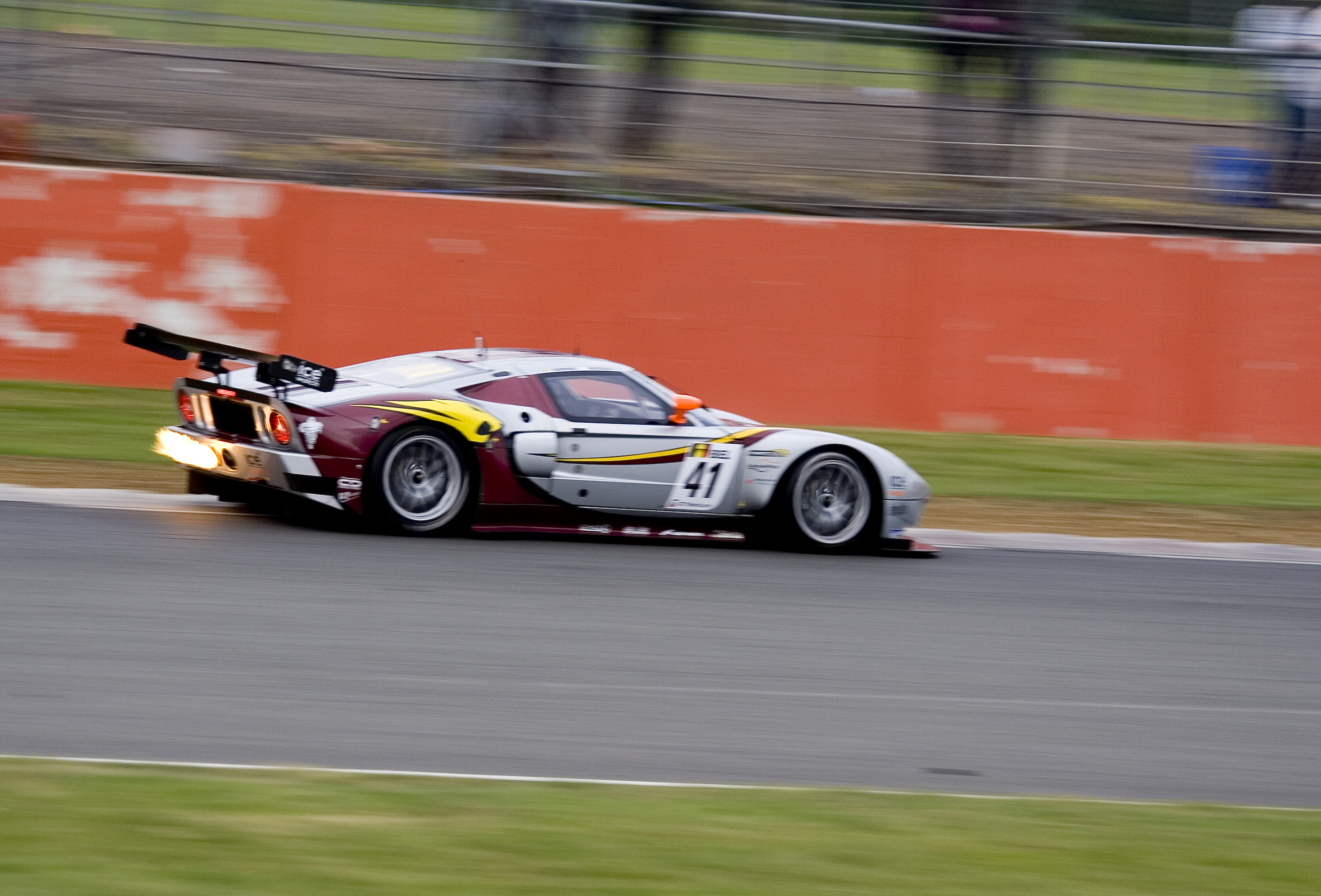
A Ford GT1 entered by Marc VDS in the FIA GT1 World Championship

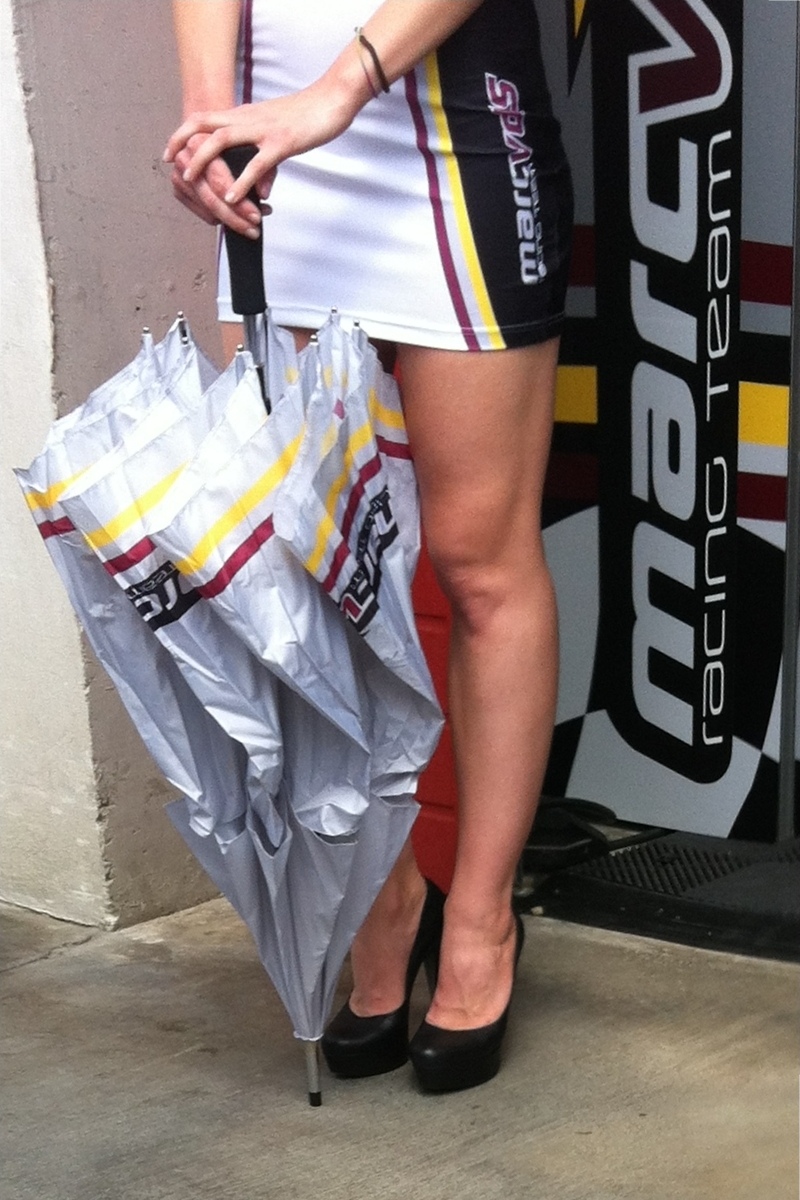
Marc VDS hospitality in the Le Mans Series

Based in Gosselies, Belgium, Marc VDS began competing in the Belcar series as part of the racing program for the Gillet Vertigo, a Belgian sports car, under the Belgian Racing title. By 2005 the Gillet program expanded to include the international FIA GT Championship, although the team was not allowed to compete for the season championship due to the low production of road legal Vertigos. Despite continued development for several years, the Gillet program ended in 2008 and van der Straten rebranded the team as Marc VDS for the 2009 season. The team however remained involved in the FIA GT Championship at the behest of Jean Michel Delporte and Bas Leinders by becoming one of two development teams for the Matech Ford GT, shifting the team to the GT1 category. Marc VDS also expanded their program through the purchase of a Volkswagen Buggy TDI Rally raid for the 2010 Dakar Rally.

After their year of development in FIA GT, Marc VDS was one of twelve teams granted entry in the inaugural FIA GT1 World Championship in 2010, where they would retain their Ford GT. The 2010 GT1 program also included an entry in the Le Mans Series' 1000 km of Spa as well as the 24 Hours of Le Mans. Shortly after entering FIA GT1, Marc VDS also announced their merger with Michael Bartholemy and Didier de Radiguès' entry in the new Moto2 category of Grand Prix motorcycle racing, where riders Scott Redding and Héctor Faubel would compete on Suter bikes. Marc VDS also added a fourth program to 2010 by co-developing a Ford Mustang with Multimatic Motorsports of Canada for use in the FIA GT3 European Championship.

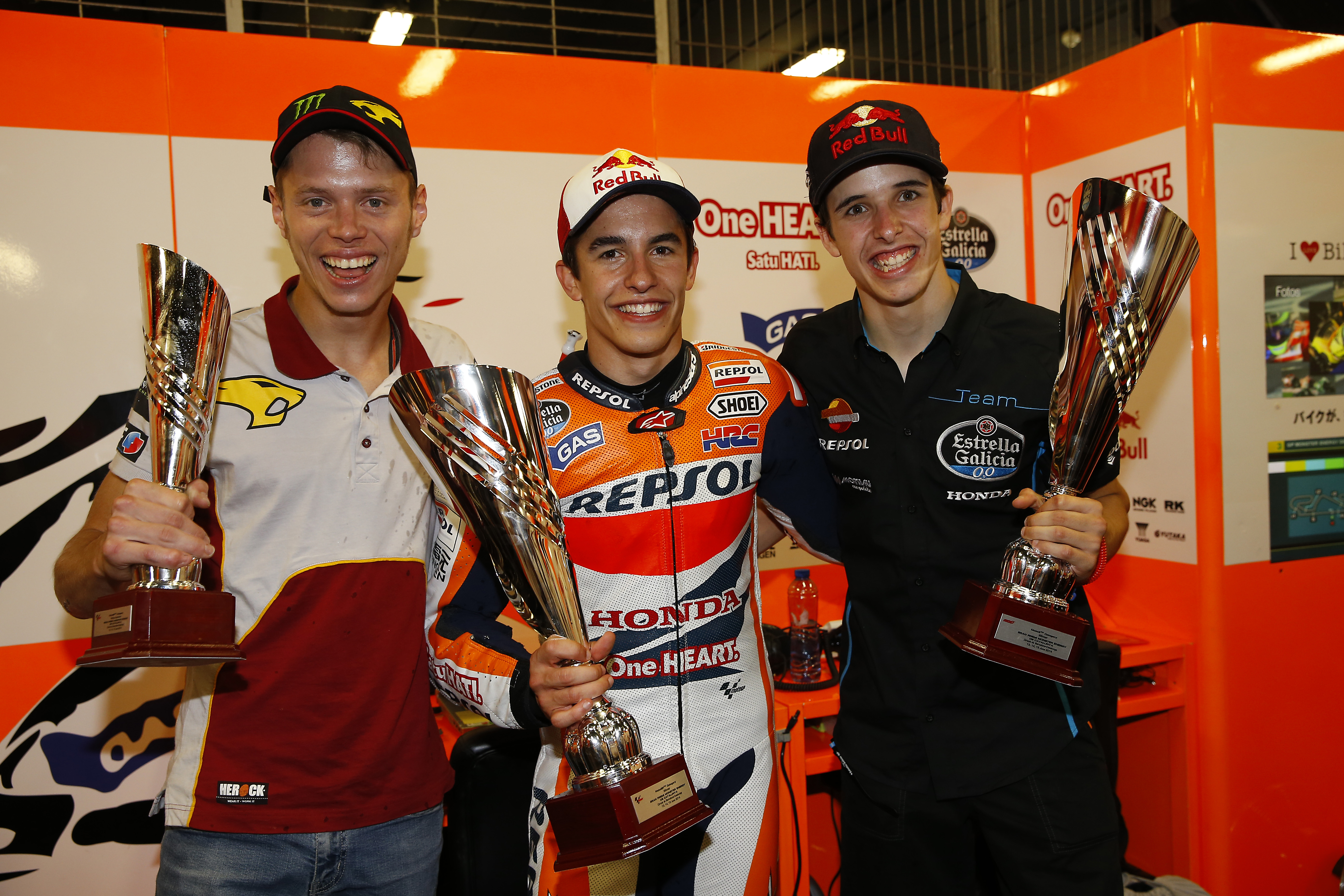
Tito Rabat celebrating winning his home GP in Barcelona with fellow Catalan winners of the other classes, brothers Álex and Marc Márquez, en route to his 2014 Moto2 championship

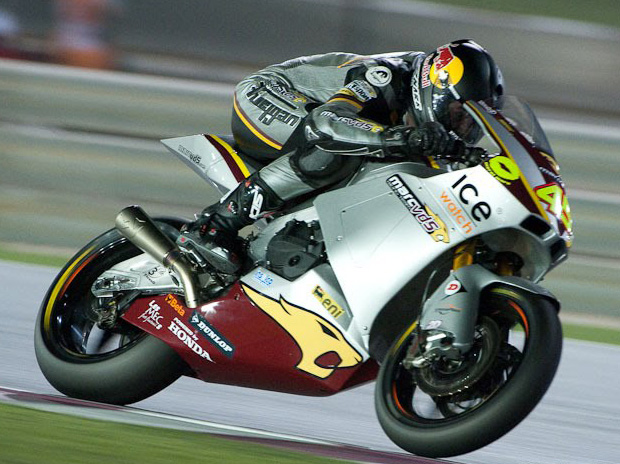
Scott Redding on the Marc VDS Suter MMX Moto2 motorcycle

In 2013, Marc VDS had a good showing in Moto2, with their riders Scott Redding and Mika Kallio finishing 2nd and 4th in the championship. The team also expanded their motorcycle grand prix programme into the Moto3 category with Kalex-built and KTM-powered machinery with Belgian rider Livio Loi. This expansion proved a challenge, with Loi and Marc VDS barely managing to finish in the points in 4 out of 15 entered races that season. The troubles continued the following season, and despite a good 4th place finish at the third race in Argentina, Livio failed to place better than 19th in the following 6 races. Livio was ultimately replaced mid-season with Spanish rider Jorge Navarro for the remainder of the season. 2014 was, however, the first taste of major success for Marc VDS in the Moto2 class, where their riders Tito Rabat and Mika Kallio finished 1st and 2nd respectively in the rider's championship.

For 2015, Marc VDS dropped their difficult Moto3 programme, as they were presented with the opportunity to run a satellite Honda bike in the premier MotoGP class. Former long-time Marc VDS rider Scott Redding returned for this season. Redding and Marc VDS were reasonably successful from the off, consistently finishing in points-scoring positions and even achieving a 3rd place podium position in San Marino. The team finished a respectable 8th in the team's championship, significantly ahead of even some teams who regularly fielded two riders.

In July 2015, Bas Leinders announced he had parted from the team. In October 2015, Marc van der Straten announced that the sportscar racing programme would end at the conclusion of the 2015 season. He claimed he had lost confidence in his managers because they had taken too great a risk with his money. In addition, the SRO Motorsports Group, organizer of the Blancpain GT Series, introduced a new regulation for the 24 Hours of Spa which stated that pro teams must compete in all races of the series to be eligible for the 24 Hours. Van der Straten did not like this decision, as the team only wished to participate in the 24 Hours of Spa. Accordingly, the Marc VDS Racing Team decided to concentrate solely on two-wheeled motorsports.

=== Motorcycle Grand Prix era ===
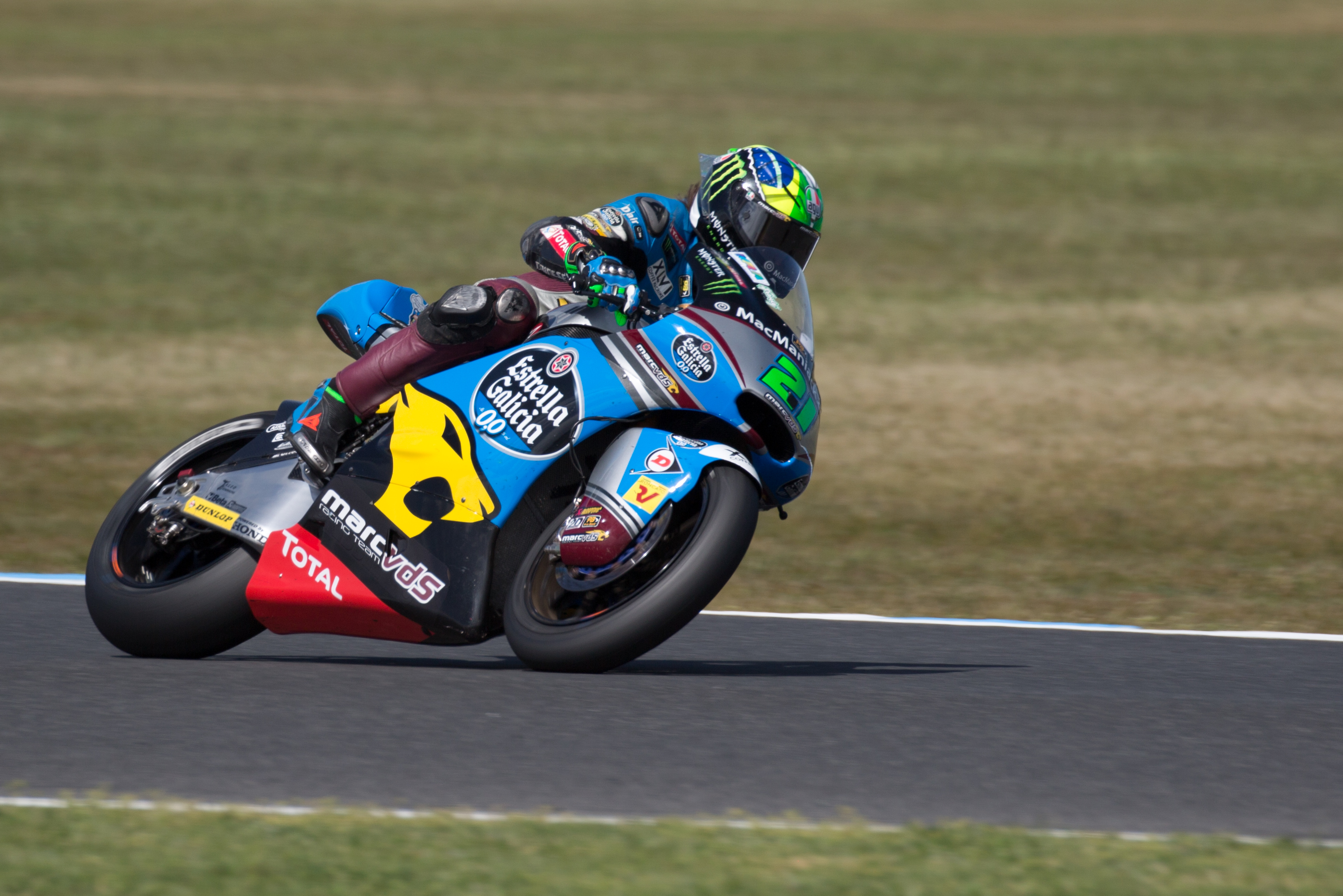
Franco Morbidelli on the Marc VDS Kalex Moto2 bike in 2016

In 2016, Marc VDS fielded two bikes in the MotoGP class, ridden by Australian Jack Miller and their former Moto2 champion Tito Rabat. Rabat was able to finish consistently in the points, but it was Jack Miller who gave the Marc VDS team their first taste of ultimate success at the pinnacle of motorcycle racing, by winning a rain-soaked Assen TT. The win was the first for a non-factory team in nearly a decade, dating back to the 2006 Portuguese GP.

2017 was another strong year for Marc VDS. In MotoGP, both riders continued with the team, and thanks to more consistent performances from both, Marc VDS finished 7th in the team's championship with 117 points, their best finish in the class to date. In the Moto2 class, rider Franco Morbidelli achieved 8 wins from 18 rounds, sealing another rider's championship for the team. Second rider Álex Márquez also managed three further wins, securing 4th place on the year.

For 2018, Morbidelli was promoted to the MotoGP squad alongside his Moto2 runner-up Thomas Lüthi. Morbidelli was able to consistently finish in the low point-scoring positions, thus being crowned rookie of the year, but Lüthi failed to score a single point that season. The team finished second-to-last in the team's championship in 11th. During the course of the season, team leader Bartholemy left the team by “mutual agreement”, according to a Marc VDS statement, after reports in German media claimed he had been embezzling team funds. As a result of this upheaval and a desire of the MotoGP commercial rights holder Dorna Sports to reduce grid sizes, Marc VDS was dropped from the MotoGP class at the end of 2018. In Moto2 the team finished 3rd in the team standings despite not earning a single win in the class, at the end of the season Joan Mir prematurely ended his three year contract with Marc VDS early to move up to the MotoGP class to take over the vacant Suzuki seat.

In 2019, Marc VDS returned to winning ways in Moto2 with Álex Márquez taking 5 wins and 10 podiums en route to the rider's championship. Teammate Xavi Vierge's inconsistent results however relegated the team to just 4th place in the team's championship. The team also joined in the inaugural MotoE season with Mike Di Meglio taking pole, fastest lap, and the win at the Austrian round.

In 2020, the team achieved second place in the Moto2 teams' championship on the backs of riders Sam Lowes' and Augusto Fernández's performances (3 wins, 4 further podiums and 6 further top 5 finishes). It was the team's best result since the teams' championship was counted in Moto2. In MotoE, Di Miglio achieved two podium finishes and ended the season in fourth position overall.

2021 saw Marc VDS and rider Di Meglio elect to leave the MotoE class, citing scheduling conflicts with Di Meglio's Endurance World Championship commitments. The team continued in Moto2 with Lowes and Fernández, the former sweeping both races of the season-opening double header from pole in Qatar. With a further win in Emilia-Romagna and two further podium finishes from Lowes and six podium finishes from Fernández, Marc VDS again achieved second place in the teams' championship.

=== World Superbike ===
Marc VDS entered the Superbike World Championship with long-time Moto2 rider Sam Lowes racing on a Ducati Panigale V4R, beginning from the 2024 season.

== Motorsports results ==
=== Grand Prix motorcycle racing ===
==== By rider ====
Year	Class	Team name	Bike	No.	Riders	Races	Wins	Podiums	Poles	F. laps	Points	Pos.
2010	Moto2	Marc VDS Racing Team	Suter MMX	45	(United Kingdom) Scott Redding	17	0	2	0	1	102	8th
2010	Moto2	Marc VDS Racing Team	Suter MMX	55	(Spain) Héctor Faubel	17	0	0	0	0	18	26th
2011	Moto2	Marc VDS Racing Team	Suter MMXI	36	(Finland) Mika Kallio	17	0	1	0	0	61	16th
2011	Moto2	Marc VDS Racing Team	Suter MMXI	45	(United Kingdom) Scott Redding	17	0	0	0	0	63	15th
2012	Moto2	Marc VDS Racing Team	Kalex Moto2	36	(Finland) Mika Kallio	17	0	1	0	0	130	6th
2012	Moto2	Marc VDS Racing Team	Kalex Moto2	45	(United Kingdom) Scott Redding	17	0	5	0	0	165	5th
2013	Moto2	Marc VDS Racing Team	Kalex Moto2	36	(Finland) Mika Kallio	17	1	4	1	1	188	4th
2013	Moto2	Marc VDS Racing Team	Kalex Moto2	45	(United Kingdom) Scott Redding	15	3	7	3	1	225	2nd
2013	Moto3	Marc VDS Racing Team	Kalex KTM	11	(Belgium) Livio Loi	15	0	0	0	0	8	22nd
2013	Moto3	Marc VDS Racing Team	Kalex KTM	95	(France) Jules Danilo	2	0	0	0	0	0	NC
2014	Moto2	Marc VDS Racing Team	Kalex Moto2	36	(Finland) Mika Kallio	18	3	10	3	3	289	2nd
2014	Moto2	Marc VDS Racing Team	Kalex Moto2	53	(Spain) Tito Rabat	18	7	14	11	5	346	1st
2014	Moto2	Marc VDS Racing Team	Kalex Moto2	41	(Australia) Aiden Wagner	1	0	0	0	0	0	NC
2014	Moto3	Marc VDS Racing Team	Kalex KTM Moto3	11	(Belgium) Livio Loi	8	0	0	0	0	17	21st
2014	Moto3	Marc VDS Racing Team	KTM RC250R	11	(Belgium) Livio Loi	1	0	0	0	0	17	21st
2014	Moto3	Marc VDS Racing Team	Kalex KTM Moto3	99	(Spain) Jorge Navarro	9	0	0	0	0	11	23rd
2015	MotoGP	EG 0,0 Marc VDS	Honda RC213V	45	(United Kingdom) Scott Redding	18	0	1	0	0	84	13th
2015	Moto2	EG 0,0 Marc VDS	Kalex Moto2	1	(Spain) Tito Rabat	15	3	10	3	3	231	3rd
2015	Moto2	EG 0,0 Marc VDS	Kalex Moto2	73	(Spain) Álex Márquez	18	0	0	0	0	73	14th
2016	MotoGP	EG 0,0 Marc VDS	Honda RC213V	43	(Australia) Jack Miller	13	1	1	0	0	57	18th
2016	MotoGP	EG 0,0 Marc VDS	Honda RC213V	53	(Spain) Tito Rabat	17	0	0	0	0	29	21st
2016	MotoGP	EG 0,0 Marc VDS	Honda RC213V	69	(United States) Nicky Hayden	1	0	0	0	0	1	26th
2016	Moto2	EG 0,0 Marc VDS	Kalex Moto2	21	(Italy) Franco Morbidelli	18	0	8	0	3	213	4th
2016	Moto2	EG 0,0 Marc VDS	Kalex Moto2	73	(Spain) Álex Márquez	17	0	1	0	0	69	13th
2017	MotoGP	EG 0,0 Marc VDS	Honda RC213V	43	(Australia) Jack Miller	17	0	0	0	0	82	11th
2017	MotoGP	EG 0,0 Marc VDS	Honda RC213V	53	(Spain) Tito Rabat	18	0	0	0	0	35	19th
2017	MotoGP	EG 0,0 Marc VDS	Honda RC213V	7	(Japan) Hiroshi Aoyama	1	0	0	0	0	0	30th
2017	Moto2	EG 0,0 Marc VDS	Kalex Moto2	21	(Italy) Franco Morbidelli	18	8	12	6	8	308	1st
2017	Moto2	EG 0,0 Marc VDS	Kalex Moto2	73	(Spain) Álex Márquez	17	3	6	3	3	201	4th
2018	MotoGP	EG 0,0 Marc VDS	Honda RC213V	12	(Switzerland) Thomas Lüthi	18	0	0	0	0	0	29th
2018	MotoGP	EG 0,0 Marc VDS	Honda RC213V	21	(Italy) Franco Morbidelli	16	0	0	0	0	50	15th
2018	MotoGP	EG 0,0 Marc VDS	Honda RC213V	6	(Germany) Stefan Bradl	1	0	0	0	0	0	24th
2018	Moto2	EG 0,0 Marc VDS	Kalex Moto2	36	(Spain) Joan Mir	18	0	4	0	1	155	6th
2018	Moto2	EG 0,0 Marc VDS	Kalex Moto2	73	(Spain) Álex Márquez	18	0	6	3	2	173	4th
2019	Moto2	EG 0,0 Marc VDS	Kalex Moto2	73	(Spain) Álex Márquez	19	5	10	6	5	262	1st
2019	Moto2	EG 0,0 Marc VDS	Kalex Moto2	97	(Spain) Xavi Vierge	18	0	0	1	0	81	13th
2019	MotoE	EG 0,0 Marc VDS	Energica Ego Corsa	63	(France) Mike Di Meglio	6	1	2	1	1	63	5th
2020	Moto2	EG 0,0 Marc VDS	Kalex Moto2	22	(United Kingdom) Sam Lowes	13	3	7	3	3	196	3rd
2020	Moto2	EG 0,0 Marc VDS	Kalex Moto2	37	(Spain) Augusto Fernández	14	0	0	0	1	71	13th
2020	MotoE	EG 0,0 Marc VDS	Energica Ego Corsa	63	(France) Mike Di Meglio	7	0	2	0	0	75	4th
2021	Moto2	Elf Marc VDS Racing Team	Kalex Moto2	22	(United Kingdom) Sam Lowes	18	3	5	6	3	190	4th
2021	Moto2	Elf Marc VDS Racing Team	Kalex Moto2	37	(Spain) Augusto Fernández	18	0	6	0	1	174	5th
2022	Moto2	Elf Marc VDS Racing Team	Kalex Moto2	8	(Australia) Senna Agius	4	0	0	0	0	7	26th
2022	Moto2	Elf Marc VDS Racing Team	Kalex Moto2	14	(Italy) Tony Arbolino	20	3	5	0	2	191.5	4th
2022	Moto2	Elf Marc VDS Racing Team	Kalex Moto2	22	(United Kingdom) Sam Lowes	20	0	2	0	0	55	19th
2023	Moto2	Elf Marc VDS Racing Team	Kalex Moto2	14	(Italy) Tony Arbolino	20	3	8	0	1	249.5	2nd
2023	Moto2	Elf Marc VDS Racing Team	Kalex Moto2	22	(United Kingdom) Sam Lowes	20	1	1	2	2	104	12th
2024	Moto2	Elf Marc VDS Racing Team	Kalex Moto2	12	(Czech Republic) Filip Salač	17	0	1	0	0	73	16th
2024	Moto2	Elf Marc VDS Racing Team	Kalex Moto2	14	(Italy) Tony Arbolino	20	0	3	1	1	148	10th
2025	Moto2	Elf Marc VDS Racing Team	Boscoscuro B-25	12	(Czech Republic) Filip Salač	21	0	0	0	0	85	17th
2025	Moto2	Elf Marc VDS Racing Team	Boscoscuro B-25	96	(United Kingdom) Jake Dixon	22	3	6	2	2	225	5th
2026	Moto2	Elf Marc VDS Racing Team	Boscoscuro B-26	44	(Spain) Arón Canet	17	0	0	0	0	17.5*	23rd*
2026	Moto2	Elf Marc VDS Racing Team	Boscoscuro B-26	53	(Turkey) Deniz Öncü	19	0	0	0	0	47.5*	17th*
2026	Moto2	Elf Marc VDS Racing Team	Boscoscuro B-26	22	(Australia) Jacob Roulstone	1	0	0	0	0	0*	33rd*

* Season still in progress.

==== By season ====
(key) (Races in bold indicate pole position; races in italics indicate fastest lap)

Year	Class	Motorcycle	Tyres	Riders	1	2	3	4	5	6	7	8	9	10	11	12	13	14	15	16	17	18	19	20	21	22	Pos.	Points
2010	Moto2	Suter MMX	D		QAT	ESP	FRA	ITA	GBR	NED	CAT	GER	CZE	IND	RSM	ARA	JPN	MAL	AUS	POR	VAL							
2010	Moto2	Suter MMX	D	(United Kingdom) Scott Redding	23	16	11	21	4	11	Ret	Ret	22	3	Ret	8	5	Ret	2	4	5						8th	120
2010	Moto2	Suter MMX	D	(Spain) Héctor Faubel	22	Ret	Ret	12	Ret	25	Ret	25	12	Ret	16	17	30	11	Ret	11	21						8th	120
2011	Moto2	Suter MMXI	D		QAT	ESP	POR	FRA	CAT	GBR	NED	ITA	GER	CZE	IND	RSM	ARA	JPN	AUS	MAL	VAL							
2011	Moto2	Suter MMXI	D	(Finland) Mika Kallio	20	17	Ret	Ret	8	Ret	Ret	17	Ret	13	9	15	10	10	16	6	2						11th	124
2011	Moto2	Suter MMXI	D	(United Kingdom) Scott Redding	31	23	25	16	11	5	24	27	7	26	5	5	15	20	7	10	30						11th	124
2012	Moto2	Kalex	D		QAT	ESP	POR	FRA	CAT	GBR	NED	GER	ITA	IND	CZE	RSM	ARA	JPN	MAL	AUS	VAL							
2012	Moto2	Kalex	D	(Finland) Mika Kallio	10	7	9	5	9	10	10	2	11	4	9	4	15	16	6	Ret	7						3rd	295
2012	Moto2	Kalex	D	(United Kingdom) Scott Redding	6	4	11	3	10	2	3	Ret	6	6	Ret	7	3	4	11	3	22						3rd	295
2013	Moto2	Kalex	D		QAT	AME	ESP	FRA	ITA	CAT	NED	GER	IND	CZE	GBR	RSM	ARA	MAL	AUS	JPN	VAL							
2013	Moto2	Kalex	D	(Finland) Mika Kallio	5	3	Ret	2	5	9	4	12	7	1	6	9	5	4	7	**2**	14						2nd	413
2013	Moto2	Kalex	D	(United Kingdom) Scott Redding	2	**5**	2	1	**1**	4	2	7	**3**	8	1	6	4	7	DNS	Ret	15						2nd	413
2013	Moto3	Kalex-KTM	D	(Belgium) Livio Loi			15	16	25	Ret	23	22	14	21	19	22	15	18	18	12	Ret						14th	8
2013	Moto3	Kalex-KTM	D	(France) Jules Danilo				Ret						24													14th	8
2014	Moto2	Kalex	D		QAT	AME	ARG	ESP	FRA	ITA	CAT	NED	GER	IND	CZE	GBR	RSM	ARA	JPN	AUS	MAL	VAL						
2014	Moto2	Kalex	D	(Finland) Mika Kallio	2	4	7	**1**	1	6	4	3	2	**1**	2	2	**2**	7	5	4	2	Ret					1st	635
2014	Moto2	Kalex	D	(Spain) Tito Rabat	**1**	**2**	**1**	4	3	**1**	**1**	**8**	4	4	**1**	1	1	2	**3**	**3**	**3**	**2**					1st	635
2014	Moto2	Kalex	D	(Australia) Aiden Wagner																26							1st	635
2014	Moto3	Kalex-KTM	D	(Belgium) Livio Loi	17	12	4	Ret	20	19	25	25															11th	28
2014	Moto3	KTM RC250GP	D	(Belgium) Livio Loi									Ret														11th	28
2014	Moto3	Kalex-KTM	D	(Spain) Jorge Navarro										14	Ret	27	15	Ret	Ret	12	12	Ret					11th	28
2015	MotoGP	Honda RC213V	B		QAT	AME	ARG	ESP	FRA	ITA	CAT	NED	GER	IND	CZE	GBR	RSM	ARA	JPN	AUS	MAL	VAL						
2015	MotoGP	Honda RC213V	B	(United Kingdom) Scott Redding	13	Ret	9	13	Ret	11	7	13	Ret	13	12	6	3	12	10	11	11	15					8th	84
2015	Moto2	Kalex	D	(Spain) Tito Rabat	Ret	4	12	**3**	2	1	3	2	Ret	5	2	3	2	**1**	DNS	DNS		**1**					3rd	304
2015	Moto2	Kalex	D	(Spain) Álex Márquez	11	15	15	9	Ret	12	11	9	18	10	4	4	Ret	Ret	18	9	Ret	12					3rd	304
2016	MotoGP	Honda RC213V	M		QAT	ARG	AME	ESP	FRA	ITA	CAT	NED	GER	AUT	CZE	GBR	RSM	ARA	JPN	AUS	MAL	VAL						
2016	MotoGP	Honda RC213V	M	(Australia) Jack Miller	14	Ret	DNS	17	Ret	Ret	10	1	7	DNS		16	DNS		Ret	10	8	15					11th	87
2016	MotoGP	Honda RC213V	M	(Spain) Tito Rabat	15	9	13	18	Ret	DNS	14	11	16	14	10	15	17	Ret	14	16	18	17					11th	87
2016	MotoGP	Honda RC213V	M	(United States) Nicky Hayden														15									11th	87
2016	Moto2	Kalex	D	(Italy) Franco Morbidelli	7	25	14	4	4	8	11	3	Ret	2	8	2	5	3	3	2	2	3					2nd	282
2016	Moto2	Kalex	D	(Spain) Álex Márquez	Ret	Ret	11	Ret	Ret	16	18	8	Ret	6	5	25	10	2	Ret	DNS	7	Ret					2nd	282
2017	MotoGP	Honda RC213V	M		QAT	ARG	AME	ESP	FRA	ITA	CAT	NED	GER	CZE	AUT	GBR	RSM	ARA	JPN	AUS	MAL	VAL						
2017	MotoGP	Honda RC213V	M	(Australia) Jack Miller	8	9	10	Ret	8	15	Ret	6	15	14	Ret	16	6	13		7	8	7					7th	117
2017	MotoGP	Honda RC213V	M	(Spain) Tito Rabat	15	12	13	Ret	11	11	15	12	18	17	19	12	Ret	15	15	16	18	10					7th	117
2017	MotoGP	Honda RC213V	M	(Japan) Hiroshi Aoyama															18								7th	117
2017	Moto2	Kalex	D	(Italy) Franco Morbidelli	**1**	1	**1**	Ret	1	**4**	5	**1**	**1**	8	1	3	Ret	1	8	3	**3**	2					1st	509
2017	Moto2	Kalex	D	(Spain) Álex Márquez	5	21	4	**1**	4	3	**1**	6	Ret	2	2	14	DNS	Ret	1	6	Ret	**5**					1st	509
2018	MotoGP	Honda RC213V	M		QAT	ARG	AME	ESP	FRA	ITA	CAT	NED	GER	CZE	AUT	GBR	RSM	ARA	THA	JPN	AUS	MAL	VAL					
2018	MotoGP	Honda RC213V	M	(Switzerland) Thomas Lüthi	16	17	18	Ret	16	Ret	Ret	20	17	16	22	C	22	17	20	20	16	16	Ret				11th	50
2018	MotoGP	Honda RC213V	M	(Italy) Franco Morbidelli	12	14	21	9	13	15	14	DNS	WD	13	19	C	12	11	14	11	8	12	Ret				11th	50
2018	MotoGP	Honda RC213V	M	(Germany) Stefan Bradl									16														11th	50
2018	Moto2	Kalex	D	(Spain) Joan Mir	11	7	4	11	3	3	Ret	5	2	Ret	8	C	5	6	Ret	11	2	10	Ret				3rd	328
2018	Moto2	Kalex	D	(Spain) Álex Márquez	**3**	5	**2**	Ret	2	5	3	3	13	Ret	Ret	C	18	4	Ret	4	7	**7**	3				3rd	328
2019	Moto2	Kalex	D		QAT	ARG	AME	ESP	FRA	ITA	CAT	NED	GER	CZE	AUT	GBR	RSM	ARA	THA	JPN	AUS	MAL	VAL					
2019	Moto2	Kalex	D	(Spain) Álex Márquez	7	3	5	24	1	1	1	Ret	**1**	**1**	2	**Ret**	3	3	5	6	8	**2**	30				4th	343
2019	Moto2	Kalex	D	(Spain) Xavi Vierge	10	**DNS**	Ret	6	5	12	8	Ret	Ret	24	Ret	10	8	10	Ret	Ret	Ret	4	7				4th	343
2019	MotoE	Energica Ego	M		GER	AUT	RSM		VAL																			
2019	MotoE	Energica Ego	M	(France) Mike Di Meglio	3	**1**	Ret	10	10	6																	—N/a	—N/a
2020	Moto2	Kalex	D		QAT	SPA	ANC	CZE	AUT	STY	RSM	EMI	CAT	FRA	ARA	TER	EUR	ARA	POR									
2020	Moto2	Kalex	D	(United Kingdom) Sam Lowes	DNS	4	4	2	4	DSQ	**8**	3	2	1	**1**	**1**	Ret	14	3								2nd	262
2020	Moto2	Kalex	D	(Spain) Augusto Fernández	Ret	13	13	5	8	Ret	5	18	Ret	4	11	8	DNS	15	8								2nd	262
2020	MotoE	Energica Ego	M		SPA	ANC	RSM	EMI		FRA																		
2020	MotoE	Energica Ego	M	(France) Mike Di Meglio	10	7	6	Ret	6	2	2																—N/a	—N/a
2021	Moto2	Kalex	D		QAT	DOH	POR	SPA	FRA	ITA	CAT	GER	NED	STY	AUT	GBR	ARA	RSM	AME	EMI	ALR	VAL						
2021	Moto2	Kalex	D	(United Kingdom) Sam Lowes	**1**	**1**	**Ret**	3	Ret	Ret	7	5	4	14	**4**	4	**Ret**	4	Ret	**1**	3	7					2nd	364
2021	Moto2	Kalex	D	(Spain) Augusto Fernández	14	6	5	Ret	Ret	Ret	5	Ret	3	3	3	6	3	6	4	2	9	3					2nd	364
2022	Moto2	Kalex	D		QAT	INA	ARG	AME	POR	SPA	FRA	ITA	CAT	GER	NED	GBR	AUT	RSM	ARA	JPN	THA	AUS	MAL	VAL				
2022	Moto2	Kalex	D	(Australia) Senna Agius																				9			5th	253.5
2022	Moto2	Kalex	D	(Italy) Tony Arbolino	5	8	6	1	Ret	3	Ret	4	10	10	7	12	Ret	7	5	6	1	Ret	1	3			5th	253.5
2022	Moto2	Kalex	D	(United Kingdom) Sam Lowes	3	4	10	Ret	Ret	Ret	DNS	Ret	Ret	3	Ret	DNS				DNS	19	12	DNS				5th	253.5
2023	Moto2	Kalex	D		POR	ARG	AME	SPA	FRA	ITA	GER	NED	GBR	AUT	CAT	RSM	IND	JPN	INA	AUS	THA	MAL	QAT	VAL				
2023	Moto2	Kalex	D	(Italy) Tony Arbolino	3	1	2	4	1	2	2	7	10	6	17	4	2	11	6	1	4	10	10	16			2nd	353.5
2023	Moto2	Kalex	D	(United Kingdom) Sam Lowes	7	10	13	**1**	**15**	Ret	7	11	7	Ret	9	Ret	19	Ret	10	Ret	14	7	12	7			2nd	353.5
2024	Moto2	Kalex	P		QAT	POR	AME	SPA	FRA	CAT	ITA	NED	GER	GBR	AUT	ARA	RSM	EMI	INA	JPN	AUS	THA	MAL	SLD				
2024	Moto2	Kalex	P	(Czech Republic) Filip Salač	21		15	11	12	12	Ret	DNS		Ret	10	11	7	10	15	3	14	14	15	5			7th	222
2024	Moto2	Kalex	P	(Italy) Tony Arbolino	20	12	11	7	8	9	16	6	9	Ret	5	2	**3**	3	7	11	8	Ret	5	13			7th	222
2025	Moto2	Boscoscuro B-25	P		THA	ARG	AME	QAT	SPA	FRA	GBR	ARA	ITA	NED	GER	CZE	AUT	HUN	CAT	RSM	JPN	INA	AUS	MAL	POR	VAL		
2025	Moto2	Boscoscuro B-25	P	(Czech Republic) Filip Salač	9	Ret	Ret	10	10	7	7	5	12	Ret	10	8	11	8	Ret	18	13	Ret	DNS	Ret	15	14	5th	310
2025	Moto2	Boscoscuro B-25	P	(United Kingdom) Jake Dixon	7	1	**1**	Ret	9	5	11	13	17	4	**3**	11	20	4	2	16	2	9	5	1	Ret	6	5th	310
2026	Moto2	Boscoscuro B-26	P		THA	BRA	AME	SPA	FRA	CAT	ITA	HUN	CZE	NED	GER	GBR	ARA	RSM	AUT	JPN	INA	AUS	MAL	QAT	POR	VAL		
2026	Moto2	Boscoscuro B-26	P	(Spain) Arón Canet	11	22	13	Ret	10	14	Ret	Ret	Ret	16	Ret	Ret	25	15	13	17	Ret	C					12th*	65*
2026	Moto2	Boscoscuro B-26	P	(Turkey) Deniz Öncü	9	20	20	13	13	22	10	17	18	Ret	17	8	8	20	9	7	22	C	Ret	21			12th*	65*
2026	Moto2	Boscoscuro B-26	P	(Australia) Jacob Roulstone																			Ret				12th*	65*

^{‡} Half points awarded as less than two thirds of the race distance (but at least three full laps) was completed.
* Season still in progress.

=== Superbike World Championship ===
==== Results by season ====
(key) (Races in bold indicate pole position; races in italics indicate fastest lap)

Year	Team	Bike	Tyres	No.	Riders	1			2			3			4			5			6			7			8			9			10			11			12			RC	Points	TC	Points	MC	Points
Year	Team	Bike	Tyres	No.	Riders	R1	SR	R2	R1	SR	R2	R1	SR	R2	R1	SR	R2	R1	SR	R2	R1	SR	R2	R1	SR	R2	R1	SR	R2	R1	SR	R2	R1	SR	R2	R1	SR	R2	R1	SR	R2	RC	Points	TC	Points	MC	Points
2024	Elf Marc VDS Racing Team	Ducati Panigale V4 R	**P**	14	(United Kingdom) Sam Lowes	AUS; 13	AUS; 8	AUS; 7	SPA; Ret	SPA; 11	SPA; 12	NED; 19	NED; 7	NED; 6	ITA; Ret	ITA; Ret	ITA; 13	GBR; 19	GBR; 8	GBR; 16	CZE; 12	CZE; Ret	CZE; DNS	POR	POR	POR	FRA; Ret	FRA; 16	FRA; Ret	ITA; Ret	ITA; 14	ITA; 11	SPA; Ret	SPA; DNS	SPA; DNS	POR; 13	POR; 15	POR; Ret	SPA; 13	SPA; 17	SPA; 14	18th	53	11th	53	1st	644
2025	Elf Marc VDS Racing Team	Ducati Panigale V4 R	**P**	14	(United Kingdom) Sam Lowes	AUS; 10	AUS; 5	AUS; 6	POR; Ret	POR; 6	POR; 11	**NED**; Ret	**NED**; 2	NED; 4	ITA; 12	ITA; 4	ITA; 5	CZE; 6	CZE; 4	CZE; 4	ITA; 7	ITA; 6	ITA; 7	GBR; Ret	GBR; 3	GBR; Ret	HUN; Ret	HUN; 2	HUN; 3	FRA; 9	FRA; Ret	FRA; Ret	SPA; 3	SPA; 5	SPA; 19	POR; WD	POR; WD	POR; WD	SPA; DNS	SPA; DNS	SPA; DNS	8th	184	8th	184	1st	647
2026	Elf Marc VDS Racing Team	Ducati Panigale V4 R	**P**	14	(United Kingdom) Sam Lowes	AUS; 5	AUS; 5	AUS; Ret	POR; 5	POR; 5	POR; 5	NED; 3	NED; 3	NED; 3	HUN; 9	HUN; 20	HUN; 6	CZE; Ret	CZE; 17	CZE; 12	ARA; 3	ARA; 3	ARA; 3	EMI; Ret	EMI; Ret	EMI; 10	GBR; 4	GBR; 3	GBR; 7	FRA; 3	FRA; Ret	FRA; 11	ITA; 3	ITA; 5	ITA; Ret	POR; 11	POR; 10	POR; 15	SPA; 2	SPA; 3	SPA; 3	4th	268	4th	268	1st	744

* Season still in progress.

=== FIM Endurance WC-Season in numbers ===
Season	Entrant	Bike	Tires	Points	Wins	Poles	FL	WC Standing	Riders
2025	Elf Marc VDS KM99	Yamaha YZF-R1	(France) Dunlop	37*	0	0	0	8th*	(France) Florian Marino (France) Randy de Puniet (France) Jérémy Guarnoni (Italy) Alessandro Del Bianco

=== Suzuka 8 Hours results ===
Year	Team	Riders	Bike	Pos	Ref
2025	(Belgium) Elf Marc VDS KM99	(France) Jérémy Guarnoni (France) Randy de Puniet (France) Florian Marino	Yamaha YZF-R1	9th	

=== Rally Raid ===
Year	Race	Class	Vehicle	Pilot Co-pilot	Class result
2010	Dakar	Car	VW Buggy TDI	(Belgium) Stéphane Henrard (Belgium) François Béguin	21

=== FIA GT1 World Championship ===
Year	Car	No.	Drivers																						
Year	Car	No.	Drivers	1		2		3		4		5		6		7		8		9		10		Points	Pos.
Year	Car	No.	Drivers	QR	CR	QR	CR	QR	CR	QR	CR	QR	CR	QR	CR	QR	CR	QR	CR	QR	CR	QR	CR	Points	Pos.
2010	Ford GT1	40	(Belgium) Bas Leinders (Belgium) Maxime Martin	6	13	19	8	16	Ret	20	4	9	Ret	Ret	11	Ret	5	3	5	11	5	3	Ret	62	8
2010	Ford GT1	41	(Finland) Markus Palttala (Belgium) Renaud Kuppens (1-7) (Italy) Matteo Bobbi (8-10)	Ret	DNS	18	10	18	15	22	14	14	15	12	17	19	15	12	10	20	15	15	Ret	62	8
2011	Ford GT1	40	(Belgium) Bas Leinders (Germany) Marc Hennerici (1-9) (Argentina) Ricardo Risatti (10)	11	DNS	Ret	10	Ret	10	Ret	8	11	6	12	10	Ret	12	10	10	Ret	Ret	Ret	9	132	6
2011	Ford GT1	41	(Belgium) Maxime Martin (France) Frédéric Makowiecki (1-2,4-5,7-8) (France) Yann Clairay (3, 10) (Belgium) Bertrand Baguette (6, 9)	1	8	5	8	6	Ret	1	Ret	NC	Ret	3	4	5	6	1	1	Ret	4	15	11	132	6

=== Blancplain Endurance Series results ===
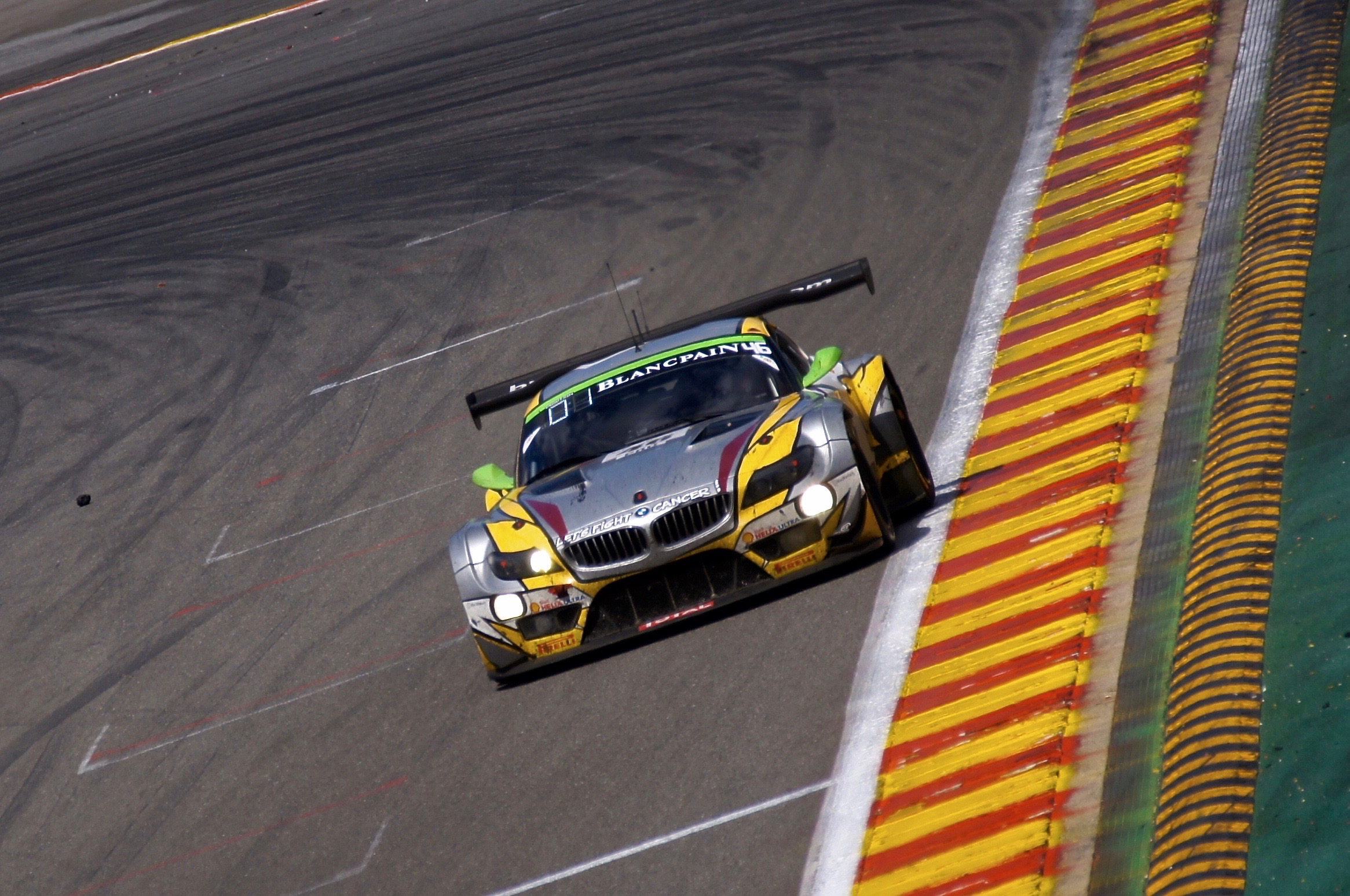
The Marc VDS Racing BMW Z4 GT3 that won the 2015 24 Hours of Spa

Year	Team	Class	Car	No.	Drivers	1	2	3	4	5	6	Points	Pos.
2011	(Belgium) Marc VDS Racing Team	Pro Cup	BMW Z4 GT3	40	(Belgium) Bas Leinders (Belgium) Maxime Martin (Finland) Markus Palttala (1-2, 4-5) (Germany) Marc Hennerici (3)			Ret	1	1		**85**	**2nd**
2011	(Belgium) Marc VDS Racing Team	Pro Cup	Ford GT3	40	(Belgium) Bas Leinders (Belgium) Maxime Martin (Finland) Markus Palttala (1-2, 4-5) (Germany) Marc Hennerici (3)	3	13					**85**	**2nd**
2011	(Belgium) Marc VDS Racing Team	Pro Cup	Ford GT3	41	(Finland) Markus Palttala (Switzerland) Jonathan Hirschi (France) Antoine Leclerc	DNS	DNS	11				**85**	**2nd**
2011	(Belgium) Marc VDS Racing Team	Pro Cup	Alpina B6 GT3	41	(Belgium) Dylan Derdaele (France) Dino Lunardi (Austria) Nikolaus Mayr-Melnhof					6		**85**	**2nd**
2011	(Belgium) Marc VDS Racing Team	Pro-Am Cup	Ford Mustang FR500 GT3	92	(Belgium) Éric Bachelart (Belgium) Marc Duez (Belgium) Jean-Michel Martin			28				-	-
2012	(Belgium) Marc VDS Racing Team	Pro Cup	BMW Z4 GT3	3	(Belgium) Bas Leinders (Belgium) Maxime Martin (Finland) Markus Palttala	1	1	2	4	Ret	4	**122**	**2nd**
2012	(Belgium) Marc VDS Racing Team	Pro Cup	BMW Z4 GT3	4	(Netherlands) Mike Hezemans (1-5) (Belgium) Bert Longin (Switzerland) Henri Moser (Netherlands) Nicky Catsburg (6)	11	Ret	6	15	8	12	**122**	**2nd**
2013	(Belgium) Marc VDS Racing Team	Pro Cup	BMW Z4 GT3	3	(Netherlands) Yelmer Buurman (Belgium) Bas Leinders (Belgium) Maxime Martin	10	Ret	1	Ret	3		**99**	**1st**
2013	(Belgium) Marc VDS Racing Team	Pro Cup	BMW Z4 GT3	4	(Netherlands) Nicky Catsburg (1-2, 4-5) (Switzerland) Henri Moser (Finland) Markus Palttala (Italy) Andrea Piccini (3)	36	5	21	Ret	7		**99**	**1st**
2013	(Belgium) Marc VDS Racing Team	Pro Cup	BMW Z4 GT3	14	(Germany) Jens Klingmann (Germany) Dirk Müller (Italy) Andrea Piccini				Ret			**99**	**1st**
2014	(Belgium) BMW Sports Trophy; Team Marc VDS	Pro Cup	BMW Z4 GT3	66	(Brazil) Augusto Farfus (Belgium) Maxime Martin (Germany) Jörg Müller				Ret			-	-
2014	(Belgium) BMW Sports Trophy; Team Marc VDS	Pro Cup	BMW Z4 GT3	77	(Germany) Lucas Luhr (Finland) Markus Palttala (Germany) Dirk Werner				2			-	-
2015	(Belgium) BMW Sports Trophy; Team Marc VDS	Pro Cup	BMW Z4 GT3	45	(Brazil) Augusto Farfus (Belgium) Maxime Martin (Germany) Dirk Werner				31			58	5th
2015	(Belgium) BMW Sports Trophy; Team Marc VDS	Pro Cup	BMW Z4 GT3	46	(Germany) Lucas Luhr (Belgium) Maxime Martin (3) (Finland) Markus Palttala (Netherlands) Nick Catsburg (4)			3	1			58	5th
Blancpain Endurance Series results

=== 24 Hours of Le Mans ===
Year	Entrant	No.	Car	Drivers	Class	Laps	Pos.	Class Pos.
2010	(Belgium) Marc VDS Racing Team	70	Ford GT1	(Belgium) Eric De Doncker (Belgium) Bas Leinders (Finland) Markus Palttala	LMGT1	26	DNF	DNF
2011	(Belgium) Kronos Racing (Belgium) Marc VDS Racing Team	22	Lola-Aston Martin B09/60	(Belgium) Vanina Ickx (Belgium) Bas Leinders (Belgium) Maxime Martin	LMP1	328	7th	7th
2024	(France) Panis Racing	65	Oreca 07-Gibson	(Switzerland) Mathias Beche (United States) Scott Huffaker (United States) Rodrigo Sales	LMP2 (Pro-Am)	293	23rd	4th
2025	(France) TDS Racing	29	Oreca 07-Gibson	(Switzerland) Mathias Beche (France) Clément Novalak (United States) Rodrigo Sales	LMP2 (Pro-Am)	365	22nd	**2nd**
2025	(France) VDS Panis Racing	48	Oreca 07-Gibson	(United Kingdom) Oliver Gray (France) Esteban Masson (France) Franck Perera	LMP2	367	19th	**2nd**

=== 24 Hours of Nürburgring ===
Year	Team	Driver	Car	Class	Laps	Overall result	Class result
2012	(Belgium) Marc VDS Racing	(Belgium) Maxime Martin (Belgium) Bas Leinders (Finland) Markus Palttala	BMW Z4 GT3	SP9	154	4	4
2013	(Belgium) Marc VDS Racing	(Belgium) Maxime Martin (Italy) Andrea Piccini (Netherlands) Yelmer Buurman (Sweden) Richard Göransson	BMW Z4 GT3	SP9	88	**2**	**2**
2014	(Belgium) BMW Sports Trophy; Team Marc VDS	(Belgium) Maxime Martin (Germany) Jörg Müller (Germany) Uwe Alzen (Germany) Marco Wittmann	BMW Z4 GT3	SP9 GT3	60	DNF	DNF
2014	(Belgium) BMW Sports Trophy; Team Marc VDS	(Belgium) Bas Leinders (Finland) Markus Palttala (Netherlands) Nick Catsburg (Germany) Dirk Adorf	BMW Z4 GT3	SP9 GT3	60	DNF	DNF
2015	(Belgium) BMW Sports Trophy; Team Marc VDS	(Belgium) Maxime Martin (Germany) Lucas Luhr (Finland) Markus Palttala (United Kingdom) Richard Westbrook	BMW Z4 GT3	SP9 GT3	156	**2**	**2**
2015	(Belgium) BMW Sports Trophy; Team Marc VDS	(Brazil) Augusto Farfus (Germany) Jörg Müller (Netherlands) Nick Catsburg (Germany) Dirk Adorf	BMW Z4 GT3	SP9 GT3	155	4	4

=== Complete NASCAR Whelen Euro Series results ===
(key) (Bold – Pole position awarded by qualifying time. Italics – Pole position earned by points standings or practice time. * – Most laps led.)

NASCAR Whelen Euro Series - Elite 1
Year	Car	No.	Drivers	1	2	3	4	5	6	7	8	9	10	11	12	Pos.	Pts
2014	Toyota Camry	32	(Belgium) Bas Leinders	VAL; 13	VAL; 18	BRH; 9	BRH; 5	TOU; 21	TOU; 7	NUR; 19	NUR; 19	UMB; 21	UMB; 21	BUG; 21	BUG; 5	14th	464
2014	Toyota Camry	46	(Finland) Markus Palttala	VAL	VAL	BRH; 8	BRH; 9	TOU	TOU	NUR; 6	NUR; 21	UMB	UMB	BUG	BUG	22nd	178
2014	Toyota Camry	46	(Luxembourg) Nathalie Maillet	VAL	VAL	BRH	BRH	TOU	TOU	NUR	NUR	UMB; DNS	UMB; DNS	BUG; DNS	BUG; DNS	32nd	106
NASCAR Whelen Euro Series - Elite 2
Year	Car	No.	Drivers	1	2	3	4	5	6	7	8	9	10	11	12	Pos.	Pts
2014	Toyota Camry	32	(Belgium) Denis Dupont	VAL; 10	VAL; DNS	BRH; 2	BRH; 22	TOU; 1*	**TOU**; 1*	NUR; 20	NUR; 18	UMB; 8	UMB; 18	BUG; 8	**BUG**; 3	5th	561
2014	Toyota Camry	46	(Luxembourg) Nathalie Maillet	VAL; 12	VAL; 16	BRH; 21	BRH; 12	TOU; 14	TOU; 17	NUR; 6	NUR; 19	UMB; DNS	UMB; DNS	BUG; 10	BUG; 6	12th	481

=== GT World Challenge Europe Endurance Cup ===
Year	Entrant	Car	No	Drivers	Class	1	2	3	4	5	6	7	Pos.	Pts
2024	(Belgium) Boutsen VDS	Mercedes-AMG GT3 Evo	9	(France) Thomas Drouet (Germany) Maximilian Götz (United Kingdom) Adam Christodoulou (Belgium) Ulysse de Pauw (Switzerland) Philip Ellis (Brazil) Sérgio Sette Câmara (Estonia) Ralf Aron	Pro	LEC; 16	SPA; 6H; 2	SPA; 12H; 9	SPA; 24H; 18	NUR; 7	MON; 6	JED; 12	8th	30
2024	(Belgium) Boutsen VDS	Mercedes-AMG GT3 Evo	10	(France) César Gazeau (France) Aurélien Panis (United States) Roee Meyuhas (France) Sébastien Baud (Belgium) Esteban Muth	Silver	LEC; 21	SPA; 6H; 27	SPA; 12H; 32	SPA; 24H; 40	**NUR**; 16	MON; NC	JED; 15	2nd	81
2025	(Belgium) Boutsen VDS	Mercedes-AMG GT3 Evo	9	(Germany) Maximilian Götz (Canada) Mikaël Grenier (Belgium) Maxime Martin	Pro	LEC; 28	MON; Ret	SPA; 6H; 39	SPA; 12H; 65†	SPA; 24H; Ret^{3}	NUR	CAT	23rd*	1*
2025	(Belgium) Boutsen VDS	Mercedes-AMG GT3 Evo	10	(France) Loris Cabirou (France) César Gazeau (France) Aurélien Panis (United Kingdom) Hugo Cook	Silver	LEC; 40	MON; 26	SPA; 6H; 18	SPA; 12H; 18	SPA; 24H; 27	NUR	CAT	NC*	0*

Notes:
† – Entry did not finish the race but was classified, as it completed more than 75% of the race distance.

=== GT World Challenge Europe Sprint Cup ===
Year	Entrant	Car	No	Drivers	Class	1	2	3	4	5	6	7	8	9	10	Pos.	Pts
2024	(Belgium) Boutsen VDS	Mercedes-AMG GT3 Evo	9	(Germany) Maximilian Götz (Andorra) Jules Gounon	Pro	BRH; 1 DNS	BRH; 2; 3	MIS; 1; 9	MIS; 2; 9	HOC; 1; 12	HOC; 2; 4	MAG; 1; 19	**MAG**; **2**; 3	CAT; 1; 1	CAT; 2; 5	5th	52
2024	(Belgium) Boutsen VDS	Mercedes-AMG GT3 Evo	10	(France) César Gazeau (France) Aurélien Panis	Silver	BRH; 1; 5	BRH; 2; 12	MIS; 1; 30	MIS; 2; 32	HOC; 1; 16	HOC; 2; 12	MAG; 1; 11	MAG; 2; 12	CAT; 1; 5	CAT; 2; 11	16th	10.5
2025	(Belgium) Boutsen VDS	Mercedes-AMG GT3 Evo	9	(Belgium) Maxime Martin (Germany) Luca Stolz	Pro	BRH; 1; 21	BRH; 2; 20	ZAN; 1; 8	ZAN; 2; 10	MIS; 1; 18	MIS; 2; 6	MAG; 1; 5	MAG; 2; 6	VAL; 1	VAL; 2	8th*	17.5*
2025	(Belgium) Boutsen VDS	Mercedes-AMG GT3 Evo	10	(France) César Gazeau (France) Aurélien Panis	Silver	BRH; 1; 13	BRH; 2; 10	ZAN; 1; 13	ZAN; 2; 12	MIS; 1 Ret	MIS; 2; 10	MAG; 1; 14	MAG; 2; 12	VAL; 1	VAL; 2	22nd*	1*
