= 2015 Moto2 World Championship =

6th running of the Moto2 World Championship

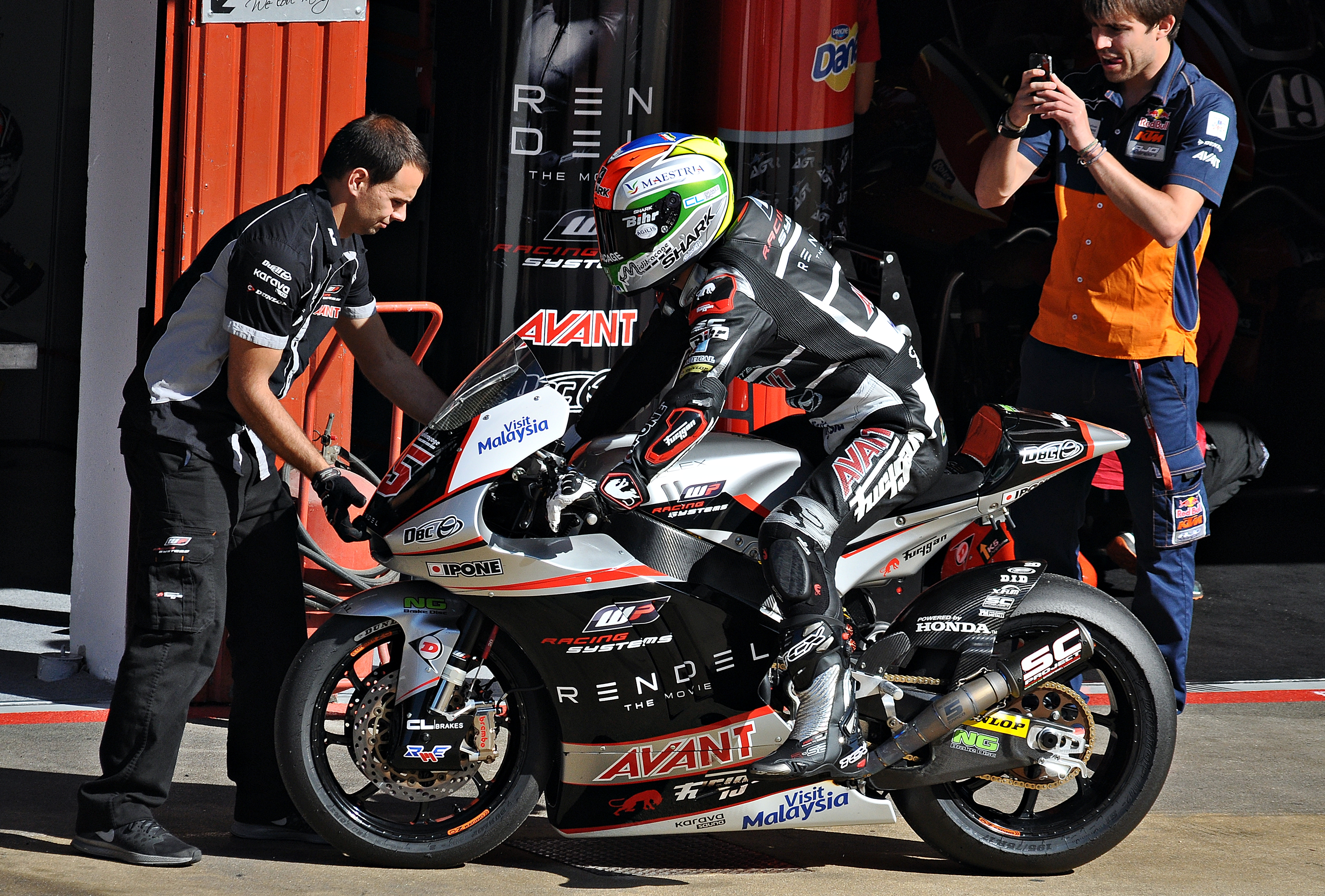
Johann Zarco was the 2015 Moto2 World Riders' Champion.

The 2015 FIM Moto2 World Championship was the intermediate class of the 67th Fédération Internationale de Motocyclisme (FIM) Road Racing World Championship season. Marc VDS Racing Team rider Tito Rabat started the season as the defending riders' champion, having won his first championship title in 2014.

Rabat had been trailing by 78 points going to the Japanese Grand Prix. However, he had to withdraw from the event with a fractured left radius. Therefore, Johann Zarco became World Champion – the ninth different world champion in the intermediate class in as many years. Ajo Motorsport rider Zarco won eight races during the season – to become the most successful French rider in Grand Prix racing – and with a tally of 352 points, set a record points total for the intermediate class; surpassing Rabat's 346 from 2014. With Rabat missing three races due to injury, rookie Álex Rins (Pons Racing) moved ahead in the standings, and despite Rabat winning the final race in Valencia, Rins finished second to seal the runner-up spot by three points. Rins won two races at Indianapolis, and Phillip Island, while Rabat added his Valencia success to wins at Mugello and Motorland Aragón.

On one of the few non-Kalex motorcycles on the grid, Sam Lowes finished fourth in the championship for Speed Up, taking a race win at Circuit of the Americas, holding off Derendinger Racing Interwetten's Thomas Lüthi, who won at Le Mans. The season's only other race winners were Jonas Folger, who won at Losail and Jerez for the AGR Team, and Xavier Siméon, who took his first win for Gresini Racing at the Sachsenring. Kalex comfortably won the manufacturers' championship; they won 17 of the season's 18 races, with only Lowes' success at Circuit of the Americas stopping a clean sweep of victories. Speed Up finished second in the championship, with 209 points to Kalex's 445.

The 2015 season was the last year that Eni was the sole fuel supplier for Moto2, as Total became the championship's fuel supplier in 2016.

== Calendar ==
The Fédération Internationale de Motocyclisme released an 18-race official calendar on 26 September 2014.

Round	Date	Grand Prix	Circuit
1	29 March ‡	Commercial Bank Grand Prix of Qatar	Lusail International Circuit, Lusail
2	12 April	(United States) Red Bull Grand Prix of the Americas	Circuit of the Americas, Austin
3	19 April	Gran Premio Red Bull de la República Argentina	Autódromo Termas de Río Hondo, Termas de Río Hondo
4	3 May	(Spain) Gran Premio bwin de España	Circuito de Jerez, Jerez de la Frontera
5	17 May	Monster Energy Grand Prix de France	Bugatti Circuit, Le Mans
6	31 May	(Italy) Gran Premio d'Italia TIM	Mugello Circuit, Scarperia e San Piero
7	14 June	(Catalonia) Gran Premi Monster Energy de Catalunya	Circuit de Barcelona-Catalunya, Montmeló
8	27 June ††	(Netherlands) Motul TT Assen	TT Circuit Assen, Assen
9	12 July	(Germany) GoPro Motorrad Grand Prix Deutschland	Sachsenring, Hohenstein-Ernstthal
10	9 August	Red Bull Indianapolis Grand Prix	Indianapolis Motor Speedway, Speedway
11	16 August	(Czech Republic) bwin Grand Prix České republiky	Brno Circuit, Brno
12	30 August	(United Kingdom) Octo British Grand Prix	Silverstone Circuit, Silverstone
13	13 September	Gran Premio TIM di San Marino e della Riviera di Rimini	Misano World Circuit, Misano Adriatico
14	27 September	(Aragon) Gran Premio Movistar de Aragón	MotorLand Aragón, Alcañiz
15	11 October	Motul Grand Prix of Japan	Motegi Circuit, Motegi
16	18 October	(Australia) Pramac Australian Motorcycle Grand Prix	Phillip Island Grand Prix Circuit, Phillip Island
17	25 October	Shell Malaysia Motorcycle Grand Prix	Sepang International Circuit, Sepang
18	8 November	(Valencian Community) Gran Premio Motul de la Comunitat Valenciana	Circuit Ricardo Tormo, Valencia

‡ = Night race
†† = Saturday race

=== Calendar changes ===
- The British Grand Prix had been scheduled to return to Donington Park for the first time since 2009, ahead of a planned move to the brand-new Circuit of Wales in 2016. However, Donington Park pulled out of hosting the event on 10 February 2015, citing financial delays. The following day, it was announced that Silverstone would host the British Grand Prix in 2015 and 2016.

== Teams and riders ==
A provisional entry list was released by the Fédération Internationale de Motocyclisme on 23 October 2014. An updated entry list was released on 2 February 2015. All Moto2 competitors raced with an identical CBR600RR inline-four engine developed by Honda. Teams competed with tyres supplied by Dunlop.

Team	Constructor	Motorcycle	No.	Rider	Rounds
(United Kingdom) FAB-Racing	FTR	FTR Moto M213	28	(United Kingdom) Bradley Ray	12
(Spain) AGR Team	Kalex	Kalex Moto2	44	(South Africa) Steven Odendaal	3
(Spain) AGR Team	Kalex	Kalex Moto2	49	(Spain) Axel Pons	1–2, 4–18
(Spain) AGR Team	Kalex	Kalex Moto2	94	(Germany) Jonas Folger	All
(Finland) Ajo Motorsport	Kalex	Kalex Moto2	5	(France) Johann Zarco	All
(Switzerland) Athinà Forward Racing (Switzerland) Forward Racing	Kalex	Kalex Moto2	3	(Italy) Simone Corsi	1–9, 11–18
(Switzerland) Athinà Forward Racing (Switzerland) Forward Racing	Kalex	Kalex Moto2	7	(Italy) Lorenzo Baldassarri	1–9, 11–18
(Switzerland) Derendinger Racing Interwetten (Switzerland) Technomag Racing Interwetten	Kalex	Kalex Moto2	12	(Switzerland) Thomas Lüthi	All
(Switzerland) Derendinger Racing Interwetten (Switzerland) Technomag Racing Interwetten	Kalex	Kalex Moto2	16	(Australia) Joshua Hook	15–18
(Switzerland) Derendinger Racing Interwetten (Switzerland) Technomag Racing Interwetten	Kalex	Kalex Moto2	70	(Switzerland) Robin Mulhauser	All
(Switzerland) Derendinger Racing Interwetten (Switzerland) Technomag Racing Interwetten	Kalex	Kalex Moto2	77	(Switzerland) Dominique Aegerter	1–14, 18
(Germany) Dynavolt Intact GP	Kalex	Kalex Moto2	11	(Germany) Sandro Cortese	All
(Belgium) EG 0,0 Marc VDS	Kalex	Kalex Moto2	1	(Spain) Tito Rabat	1–16, 18
(Belgium) EG 0,0 Marc VDS	Kalex	Kalex Moto2	73	(Spain) Álex Márquez	All
(Italy) Federal Oil Gresini Moto2 (Italy) Gresini Racing	Kalex	Kalex Moto2	19	(Belgium) Xavier Siméon	All
(Italy) Federal Oil Gresini Moto2 (Italy) Gresini Racing	Kalex	Kalex Moto2	54	(Italy) Mattia Pasini	6, 13
(Italy) Italtrans Racing Team	Kalex	Kalex Moto2	21	(Italy) Franco Morbidelli	1–11, 16–18
(Italy) Italtrans Racing Team	Kalex	Kalex Moto2	36	(Finland) Mika Kallio	1–13
(Italy) Italtrans Racing Team	Kalex	Kalex Moto2	57	(Spain) Edgar Pons	14–18
(Italy) Italtrans Racing Team	Kalex	Kalex Moto2	64	(Italy) Federico Caricasulo	12–14
(Japan) Idemitsu Honda Team Asia	Kalex	Kalex Moto2	25	(Malaysia) Azlan Shah	All
(Japan) Idemitsu Honda Team Asia	Kalex	Kalex Moto2	30	(Japan) Takaaki Nakagami	All
(Monaco) JiR Moto2	Kalex	Kalex Moto2	4	(Switzerland) Randy Krummenacher	All
(Spain) Paginas Amarillas HP 40 (Spain) Pons Racing Junior Team	Kalex	Kalex Moto2	9	(Italy) Luca Marini	13
(Spain) Paginas Amarillas HP 40 (Spain) Pons Racing Junior Team	Kalex	Kalex Moto2	39	(Spain) Luis Salom	All
(Spain) Paginas Amarillas HP 40 (Spain) Pons Racing Junior Team	Kalex	Kalex Moto2	40	(Spain) Álex Rins	All
(Spain) Paginas Amarillas HP 40 (Spain) Pons Racing Junior Team	Kalex	Kalex Moto2	57	(Spain) Edgar Pons	4, 7, 11
Petronas Raceline Malaysia; Petronas AHM Malaysia	Kalex	Kalex Moto2	55	(Malaysia) Hafizh Syahrin	All
Petronas Raceline Malaysia; Petronas AHM Malaysia	Kalex	Kalex Moto2	93	(Malaysia) Ramdan Rosli	7, 17
(Spain) Sports-Millions-Emwe-SAG (Spain) APH PTT The Pizza SAG	Kalex	Kalex Moto2	2	(Switzerland) Jesko Raffin	All
(Spain) Sports-Millions-Emwe-SAG (Spain) APH PTT The Pizza SAG	Kalex	Kalex Moto2	10	(Thailand) Thitipong Warokorn	All
(Japan) Moriwaki Racing	Moriwaki	Moriwaki MD600	72	(Japan) Yuki Takahashi	15
(Japan) NTS T.Pro Project	NTS	???	71	(Japan) Tomoyoshi Koyama	15
(Netherlands) Abbink GP	Speed Up	Speed Up SF14	13	(Netherlands) Jasper Iwema	8
(Qatar) QMMF Racing Team	Speed Up	Speed Up SF15	36	(Finland) Mika Kallio	14–18
(Qatar) QMMF Racing Team	Speed Up	Speed Up SF15	60	(Spain) Julián Simón	All
(Qatar) QMMF Racing Team	Speed Up	Speed Up SF15	95	(Australia) Anthony West	1–13
(Italy) Speed Up Racing	Speed Up	Speed Up SF15	22	(United Kingdom) Sam Lowes	All
JPMoto Malaysia	Suter	Suter MMX2	15	(Thailand) Ratthapark Wilairot	7–10
JPMoto Malaysia	Suter	Suter MMX2	51	(Malaysia) Zaqhwan Zaidi	1–6
JPMoto Malaysia	Suter	Suter MMX2	88	(Spain) Ricard Cardús	11–18
(Italy) Octo IodaRacing Project (Italy) E-Motion IodaRacing Team	Suter	Suter MMX2	66	(Germany) Florian Alt	All
(Italy) Team Ciatti	Suter	Suter MMX2	32	(Italy) Federico Fuligni	14, 18
(Italy) Tasca Racing Scuderia Moto2	Tech 3	Tech 3 Mistral 610	96	(France) Louis Rossi	All
(France) Tech 3	Tech 3	Tech 3 Mistral 610	23	(Germany) Marcel Schrötter	All
(France) Tech 3	Tech 3	Tech 3 Mistral 610	88	(Spain) Ricard Cardús	1–9
(France) Tech 3	Tech 3	Tech 3 Mistral 610	97	(Spain) Xavi Vierge	10–18
(France) Promoto Sport	TransFIORmers	???	20	(France) Louis Bulle	5
(France) Promoto Sport	TransFIORmers	???	90	(France) Lucas Mahias	18

Key
Regular rider
Wildcard rider
Replacement rider

=== Rider changes ===
- Álex Rins moved up to Moto2 with Páginas Amarillas HP 40, filling the seat vacated by Maverick Viñales who moved up to MotoGP with Team Suzuki Ecstar.
- After competing in the 2014 season with Tech 3 as a replacement rider, Ricard Cardús moved to a full-time ride with Tech 3.
- Lorenzo Baldassarri left Gresini Racing at the end of the 2014 season to join Forward Racing.
- Mika Kallio left Marc VDS Racing Team at the end of the 2014 season to join Italtrans Racing. Kallio's place at Marc VDS was taken by 2014 Moto3 winner Álex Márquez.
- Randy Krummenacher left IodaRacing Project at the end of the 2014 season to join JiR.
- Johann Zarco rode for Ajo Motorsport.
- Jesko Raffin made a full-time debut to Moto2 with SAG Team. Replacing Louis Rossi who joined to Tasca Racing Scuderia Moto2.
- Zaqhwan Zaidi made his Moto2 debut, joining JPMoto Malaysia.
- Julián Simón moved from Italtrans to QMMF Racing.
- Florian Alt made his Moto2 debut, joining IodaRacing Project.
- Jordi Torres, Nicolás Terol, and Román Ramos left Moto2 for Superbike World Championship.

== Results and standings ==
=== Grands Prix ===
Round	Grand Prix	Pole position	Fastest lap	Winning rider	Winning team	Winning constructor	Report
1	Qatar motorcycle Grand Prix	(United Kingdom) Sam Lowes	(France) Johann Zarco	(Germany) Jonas Folger	(Spain) AGR Team	(Germany) Kalex	Report
2	(United States) Motorcycle Grand Prix of the Americas	(Belgium) Xavier Siméon	(United Kingdom) Sam Lowes	(United Kingdom) Sam Lowes	(Italy) Speed Up Racing	(Italy) Speed Up	Report
3	(Argentina) Argentine Republic motorcycle Grand Prix	(France) Johann Zarco	(Germany) Jonas Folger	(France) Johann Zarco	(Finland) Ajo Motorsport	(Germany) Kalex	Report
4	(Spain) Spanish motorcycle Grand Prix	(Spain) Tito Rabat	(Spain) Álex Rins	(Germany) Jonas Folger	(Spain) AGR Team	(Germany) Kalex	Report
5	(France) French motorcycle Grand Prix	(Spain) Álex Rins	(Switzerland) Thomas Lüthi	(Switzerland) Thomas Lüthi	(Switzerland) Derendinger Racing Interwetten	(Germany) Kalex	Report
6	(Italy) Italian motorcycle Grand Prix	(United Kingdom) Sam Lowes	(Spain) Tito Rabat	(Spain) Tito Rabat	(Belgium) EG 0,0 Marc VDS	(Germany) Kalex	Report
7	(Catalonia) Catalan motorcycle Grand Prix	(France) Johann Zarco	(Spain) Álex Rins	(France) Johann Zarco	(Finland) Ajo Motorsport	(Germany) Kalex	Report
8	(Netherlands) Dutch TT	(France) Johann Zarco	(Spain) Tito Rabat	(France) Johann Zarco	(Finland) Ajo Motorsport	(Germany) Kalex	Report
9	(Germany) German motorcycle Grand Prix	(France) Johann Zarco	(Italy) Franco Morbidelli	(Belgium) Xavier Siméon	(Italy) Federal Oil Gresini Moto2	(Germany) Kalex	Report
10	Indianapolis motorcycle Grand Prix	(Spain) Álex Rins	(Italy) Franco Morbidelli	(Spain) Álex Rins	(Spain) Paginas Amarillas HP 40	(Germany) Kalex	Report
11	Czech Republic motorcycle Grand Prix	(France) Johann Zarco	(Switzerland) Thomas Lüthi	(France) Johann Zarco	(Finland) Ajo Motorsport	(Germany) Kalex	Report
12	(United Kingdom) British motorcycle Grand Prix	(United Kingdom) Sam Lowes	(Germany) Florian Alt	(France) Johann Zarco	(Finland) Ajo Motorsport	(Germany) Kalex	Report
13	San Marino and Rimini Riviera motorcycle Grand Prix	(France) Johann Zarco	(Germany) Jonas Folger	(France) Johann Zarco	(Finland) Ajo Motorsport	(Germany) Kalex	Report
14	Aragon motorcycle Grand Prix	(Spain) Tito Rabat	(Spain) Álex Rins	(Spain) Tito Rabat	(Belgium) EG 0,0 Marc VDS	(Germany) Kalex	Report
15	(Japan) Japanese motorcycle Grand Prix	(France) Johann Zarco	(Germany) Jonas Folger	(France) Johann Zarco	(Finland) Ajo Motorsport	(Germany) Kalex	Report
16	(Australia) Australian motorcycle Grand Prix	(Spain) Álex Rins	(Spain) Álex Rins	(Spain) Álex Rins	(Spain) Paginas Amarillas HP 40	(Germany) Kalex	Report
17	(Malaysia) Malaysian motorcycle Grand Prix	(Switzerland) Thomas Lüthi	(Switzerland) Thomas Lüthi	(France) Johann Zarco	(Finland) Ajo Motorsport	(Germany) Kalex	Report
18	Valencian Community motorcycle Grand Prix	(Spain) Tito Rabat	(Spain) Tito Rabat	(Spain) Tito Rabat	(Belgium) EG 0,0 Marc VDS	(Germany) Kalex	Report

=== Riders' standings ===
Scoring system

Points were awarded to the top fifteen finishers. A rider had to finish the race to earn points.

Position	**1st**	**2nd**	**3rd**	**4th**	**5th**	**6th**	**7th**	**8th**	**9th**	**10th**	**11th**	**12th**	**13th**	**14th**	**15th**
Points	25	20	16	13	11	10	9	8	7	6	5	4	3	2	1

Pos	Rider	Bike	QAT (Qatar)	AME (United States)	ARG (Argentina)	SPA (Spain)	FRA (France)	ITA (Italy)	CAT (Catalonia)	NED (Netherlands)	GER (Germany)	INP (Indianapolis)	CZE (Czech Republic)	GBR (United Kingdom)	RSM (San Marino)	ARA (Aragon)	JPN (Japan)	AUS (Australia)	MAL (Malaysia)	VAL (Valencian Community)	Pts
1	(France) Johann Zarco	Kalex	8	2	**1**	2	3	2	**1**	**1**	**2**	2	**1**	1	**1**	6	**1**	7	1	7	352
2	(Spain) Álex Rins	Kalex	4	3	2	18	**17**	11	2	4	3	**1**	3	2	DSQ	2	11	**1**	Ret	2	234
3	(Spain) Tito Rabat	Kalex	Ret	4	12	**3**	2	1	3	2	Ret	5	2	3	2	**1**	DNS	DNS		**1**	231
4	(United Kingdom) Sam Lowes	Speed Up	**Ret**	1	3	20	4	**4**	4	3	5	Ret	5	**6**	Ret	3	8	2	13	5	186
5	(Switzerland) Thomas Lüthi	Kalex	3	12	6	4	1	Ret	6	5	6	6	7	9	10	5	Ret	15	**2**	3	179
6	(Germany) Jonas Folger	Kalex	1	16	9	1	Ret	Ret	7	7	14	12	6	5	6	4	2	Ret	3	14	163
7	(Belgium) Xavier Siméon	Kalex	2	**Ret**	22	5	8	6	Ret	6	1	8	16	25	12	Ret	Ret	5	10	16	113
8	(Japan) Takaaki Nakagami	Kalex	14	10	20	17	7	13	20	13	7	9	12	14	3	8	22	4	4	11	100
9	(Italy) Lorenzo Baldassarri	Kalex	10	26	8	13	21	10	10	Ret	8		Ret	Ret	7	10	12	3	5	4	96
10	(Italy) Franco Morbidelli	Kalex	5	5	5	6	5	Ret	8	19	Ret	3	10					11	15	Ret	90
11	(Germany) Sandro Cortese	Kalex	7	14	7	Ret	14	8	Ret	17	11	Ret	8	8	8	13	3	Ret	7	13	90
12	(Italy) Simone Corsi	Kalex	Ret	11	Ret	8	18	Ret	13	10	4		11	Ret	4	9	7	13	9	9	86
13	(Spain) Luis Salom	Kalex	Ret	27	11	7	Ret	5	5	DNS	17	16	9	17	9	Ret	Ret	6	6	6	80
14	(Spain) Álex Márquez	Kalex	11	15	15	9	Ret	12	11	9	18	10	4	4	Ret	Ret	18	9	Ret	12	73
15	(Finland) Mika Kallio	Kalex	6	8	4	Ret	Ret	Ret	12	8	12	Ret	15	20	Ret						72
15	(Finland) Mika Kallio	Speed Up														11	15	8	12	10	72
16	(Malaysia) Hafizh Syahrin	Kalex	12	6	10	12	9	Ret	14	15	16	Ret	14	16	18	7	5	16	8	Ret	64
17	(Switzerland) Dominique Aegerter	Kalex	15	18	13	16	10	3	9	12	10	4	13	13	24	Ret				WD	62
18	(Spain) Julián Simón	Speed Up	13	9	26	11	6	7	15	11	9	Ret	18	18	5	Ret	16	18	25	18	58
19	(Spain) Axel Pons	Kalex	Ret	DNS		Ret	15	9	Ret	22	15	7	17	15	11	12	Ret	24	11	8	41
20	(Germany) Marcel Schrötter	Tech 3	16	13	16	10	13	16	16	18	Ret	14	19	11	17	15	9	12	Ret	15	32
21	(Switzerland) Randy Krummenacher	Kalex	17	21	21	14	12	14	18	14	13	Ret	20	12	14	17	10	10	17	21	31
22	(Australia) Anthony West	Speed Up	Ret	7	14	15	11	19	22	Ret	Ret	13	21	7	15						30
23	(Malaysia) Azlan Shah	Kalex	18	19	17	21	19	15	19	16	Ret	11	23	19	13	14	4	21	16	DNS	24
24	(Spain) Ricard Cardús	Tech 3	Ret	17	18	Ret	16	17	Ret	Ret	19										20
24	(Spain) Ricard Cardús	Suter											24	10	Ret	18	6	14	14	19	20
25	(France) Louis Rossi	Tech 3	9	22	Ret	DNS	Ret	20	23	Ret	Ret	Ret	Ret	27	19	23	20	23	18	DNS	7
26	(Japan) Tomoyoshi Koyama	NTS															13				3
27	(Japan) Yuki Takahashi	Moriwaki															14				2
28	(Switzerland) Robin Mulhauser	Kalex	20	20	23	23	20	22	Ret	20	20	15	Ret	23	Ret	19	23	Ret	19	22	1
	(Spain) Xavi Vierge	Tech 3										Ret	Ret	22	23	16	Ret	19	22	17	0
	(Italy) Mattia Pasini	Kalex						18							16						0
	(Switzerland) Jesko Raffin	Kalex	22	24	28	25	24	23	24	21	21	17	26	21	Ret	20	17	17	21	24	0
	(Spain) Edgar Pons	Kalex				19			17				22			Ret	19	22	20	Ret	0
	(Thailand) Thitipong Warokorn	Kalex	19	23	24	22	22	21	25	23	22	18	25	Ret	20	22	Ret	25	27	23	0
	(Germany) Florian Alt	Suter	21	25	25	24	23	24	21	Ret	DNS	19	Ret	24	22	21	21	Ret	26	20	0
	(South Africa) Steven Odendaal	Kalex			19																0
	(Australia) Joshua Hook	Kalex															Ret	20	23	26	0
	(Italy) Luca Marini	Kalex													21						0
	(Thailand) Ratthapark Wilairot	Suter							Ret	24	23	Ret									0
	(Malaysia) Zaqhwan Zaidi	Suter	23	Ret	27	26	25	Ret													0
	(Malaysia) Ramdan Rosli	Kalex							26										24		0
	(Italy) Federico Fuligni	Suter														Ret				25	0
	(Netherlands) Jasper Iwema	Speed Up								25											0
	(Italy) Federico Caricasulo	Kalex												26	Ret	DNS					0
	(France) Louis Bulle	TransFIORmers					26														0
	(France) Lucas Mahias	TransFIORmers																		Ret	0
	(United Kingdom) Bradley Ray	FTR												Ret							0
Pos	Rider	Bike	QAT (Qatar)	AME (United States)	ARG (Argentina)	SPA (Spain)	FRA (France)	ITA (Italy)	CAT (Catalonia)	NED (Netherlands)	GER (Germany)	INP (Indianapolis)	CZE (Czech Republic)	GBR (United Kingdom)	RSM (San Marino)	ARA (Aragon)	JPN (Japan)	AUS (Australia)	MAL (Malaysia)	VAL (Valencian Community)	Pts

Colour	Result
Gold	Winner
Silver	Second place
Bronze	Third place
Green	Points classification
Blue	Non-points classification
Blue	Non-classified finish (NC)
Purple	Retired, not classified (Ret)
Red	Did not qualify (DNQ)
Red	Did not pre-qualify (DNPQ)
Black	Disqualified (DSQ)
White	Did not start (DNS)
White	Withdrew (WD)
White	Race cancelled (C)
Blank	Did not practice (DNP)
Blank	Did not arrive (DNA)
Blank	Excluded (EX)

**Bold** – Pole
Italics – Fastest Lap
Light blue – Rookie

=== Constructors' standings ===
Each constructor received the same number of points as their best placed rider in each race.

Pos	Constructor	QAT (Qatar)	AME (United States)	ARG (Argentina)	SPA (Spain)	FRA (France)	ITA (Italy)	CAT (Catalonia)	NED (Netherlands)	GER (Germany)	INP (Indianapolis)	CZE (Czech Republic)	GBR (United Kingdom)	RSM (San Marino)	ARA (Aragon)	JPN (Japan)	AUS (Australia)	MAL (Malaysia)	VAL (Valencian Community)	Pts
1	(Germany) Kalex	1	2	1	1	1	1	1	1	1	1	1	1	1	1	1	1	1	1	445
2	(Italy) Speed Up	13	1	3	11	4	4	4	3	5	13	5	6	5	3	8	2	12	5	209
3	(France) Tech 3	9	13	16	10	13	16	16	18	19	14	19	11	17	15	9	12	18	15	39
4	(Switzerland) Suter	21	25	25	24	23	24	21	24	23	19	24	10	22	18	6	14	14	19	20
5	(Japan) NTS															13				3
6	(Japan) Moriwaki															14				2
	(France) TransFIORmers					26													Ret	0
	(United Kingdom) FTR												Ret							0
Pos	Constructor	QAT (Qatar)	AME (United States)	ARG (Argentina)	SPA (Spain)	FRA (France)	ITA (Italy)	CAT (Catalonia)	NED (Netherlands)	GER (Germany)	INP (Indianapolis)	CZE (Czech Republic)	GBR (United Kingdom)	RSM (San Marino)	ARA (Aragon)	JPN (Japan)	AUS (Australia)	MAL (Malaysia)	VAL (Valencian Community)	Pts
