= Mallory Park Race of the Year =

Motorcycle race

Race of the Year

Race information
- Venue: Mallory Park (1958–2018)
- First race: 1958
- Last race: 2018
- Most wins (rider): Mike Hailwood (5)
- Most wins (manufacturer): Suzuki (14)

The Race of the Year was a non-championship motorcycle race held at the Mallory Park circuit in Leicester, England between 1958 and 1981, and again between 1986 and 2008, with a one-off race in 2011.

It often attracted high quality entries from the MotoGP and Superbike World Championship. The first race was won by John Surtees, riding a MV Agusta. The 2011 running of the event was won by Sam Lowes on a Supersport Honda after hard-fought battle with CRT MotoGP rider, James Ellison on another Honda. The 2014 event was won by John Ingram.

== Winners of the Race of the Year ==
=== By Year ===
Year	Race	Rider	Manufacturer
1958	Race of the Year	(England) John Surtees	500cc MV Agusta
1959	Race of the Year	(Scotland) Bob McIntyre	500cc Norton
1960	Race of the Year	(England) Mike Hailwood	500cc Norton
1961	Race of the Year	(Rhodesia) Gary Hocking	500cc MV Agusta
1962	Race of the Year	(England) Derek Minter	500cc Norton
1963	Race of the Year	(England) Mike Hailwood	500cc MV Agusta
1964	Race of the Year	(England) Mike Hailwood	500cc MV Agusta
1965	Race of the Year	(England) John Cooper	500cc Norton
1966	Race of the Year	(Italy) Giacomo Agostini	500cc MV Agusta
1967	Race of the Year	(England) Mike Hailwood	297cc Honda
1968	Race of the Year	(England) Mike Hailwood	297cc Honda
1969	Race of the Year	(Italy) Giacomo Agostini	500cc MV Agusta
1970	Race of the Year	(England) John Cooper	350cc Yamsel
1971	Race of the Year	(England) John Cooper	750cc BSA
1972	Race of the Year	(Finland) Jarno Saarinen	350cc Yamaha
1973	Race of the Year	(England) Phil Read	500cc MV Agusta
1974	Race of the Year	(England) Barry Sheene	750cc Suzuki
1975	Race of the Year	(England) Barry Sheene	750cc Suzuki
1976	Race of the Year	(United States) Steve Baker	750cc Yamaha
1977	Race of the Year	(United States) Pat Hennen	653cc Suzuki
1978	Race of the Year	(England) Barry Sheene	500cc Suzuki
1979	Race of the Year	(United States) Kenny Roberts	500cc Yamaha
1980	Race of the Year	(United States) Randy Mamola	500cc Suzuki
1981	Race of the Year	(New Zealand) Graeme Crosby	500cc Suzuki
1986	Race of the Year	(England) Roger Marshall	500cc Honda
1987	Race of the Year	(England) Roger Marshall	1100cc Suzuki
1988	Race of the Year	(England) Jamie Whitham	750cc Suzuki
1989	Race of the Year	(England) Terry Rymer	750cc Yamaha
1990	Race of the Year	(England) Terry Rymer	750cc Yamaha
1991	Race of the Year	(England) Rob McElnea	750cc Yamaha
1992	Race of the Year	(England) John Reynolds	750cc Kawasaki
1994	Race of the Year	(England) Matt Llewellyn	926cc Ducati
1995	Race of the Year	(England) Chris Walker	250cc Honda
1996	Race of the Year	(England) Ray Stringer	750cc Kawasaki
1997	Race of the Year	(England) Jamie Vincent	500cc Honda
1998	Race of the Year	(England) Chris Walker	750cc Kawasaki
1999	Race of the Year	(England) Jamie Vincent	500cc Honda
2000	Race of the Year	(England) Steve Plater	750cc Kawasaki
2001	Race of the Year	(England) Michael Rutter	750cc Kawasaki
2002	Race of the Year	(Australia) Glen Richards	750cc Kawasaki
2003	Race of the Year	(England) Michael Rutter	998cc Ducati
2004	Race of the Year	(England) John Reynolds	1000cc Suzuki
2005	Race of the Year	(Australia) Glen Richards	1000cc Kawasaki
2006	Race of the Year	(England) Chris Walker	1000cc Suzuki
2007	Race of the Year	(England) Cal Crutchlow	1000cc Suzuki
2008	Race of the Year	(England) Tom Sykes	1000cc Suzuki
2011	Race of the Year	(England) Sam Lowes	600cc Honda
2014	Race of the Year	(England) John Ingram	1000cc Kawasaki
2015	Cancelled		
2016	Race of the Year	(Scotland) Taylor Mackenzie	1000cc BMW
2017	Race of the Year	(England) Bradley Ray	1000cc Suzuki
2018	Race of the Year	(England) Richard Cooper	1000cc Suzuki
2019	Cancelled		
