= 2011 Race of the Year =

Layout of the Mallory Park

The 2011 Race of the Year was a non-championship motorcycle race held at the Mallory Park circuit in Leicester, England.

== Race summary ==
Parkalgar Honda's Sam Lowes fought a hard battle to take victory on the 2011 Buildbase Mallory Park Race of the Year, setting a new Supersport lap record in the process, in very hot and slippery track conditions.

The first start was red-flagged on the second lap, when pole-sitter John Ingram crashed his BMW on the Stebbe Straight, removing Christian Iddon (Triumph) in the process. Both riders were unhurt and unable to take the restart.

It was Bogdanka PTR Honda of James Ellison who took control of the early stages of the race, quickly pulling out a gap on the chasing pack. Lowes was fourth on the opening lap, but moving up to second and set about hunting down Ellison, passing him into the hairpin on his Parkalgar Honda Supersport

Ellison looked to come straight back. Despite constant pressure for the rest of the race, it was Lowes who took the win by 2.4secs.

== Classification ==
Pos	Driver	Entrant / Bike	Laps	Time
1st	(England) Sam Lowes	Parkalgar Honda	18	
2nd	(England) James Ellison	Bogdanka PTR Honda	18	+ 2.471 s
3rd	(Australia) Billy McConnell	Triumph	18	+ 16.382s
