= Sam Lowes =

British motorcycle racer (born 1990)

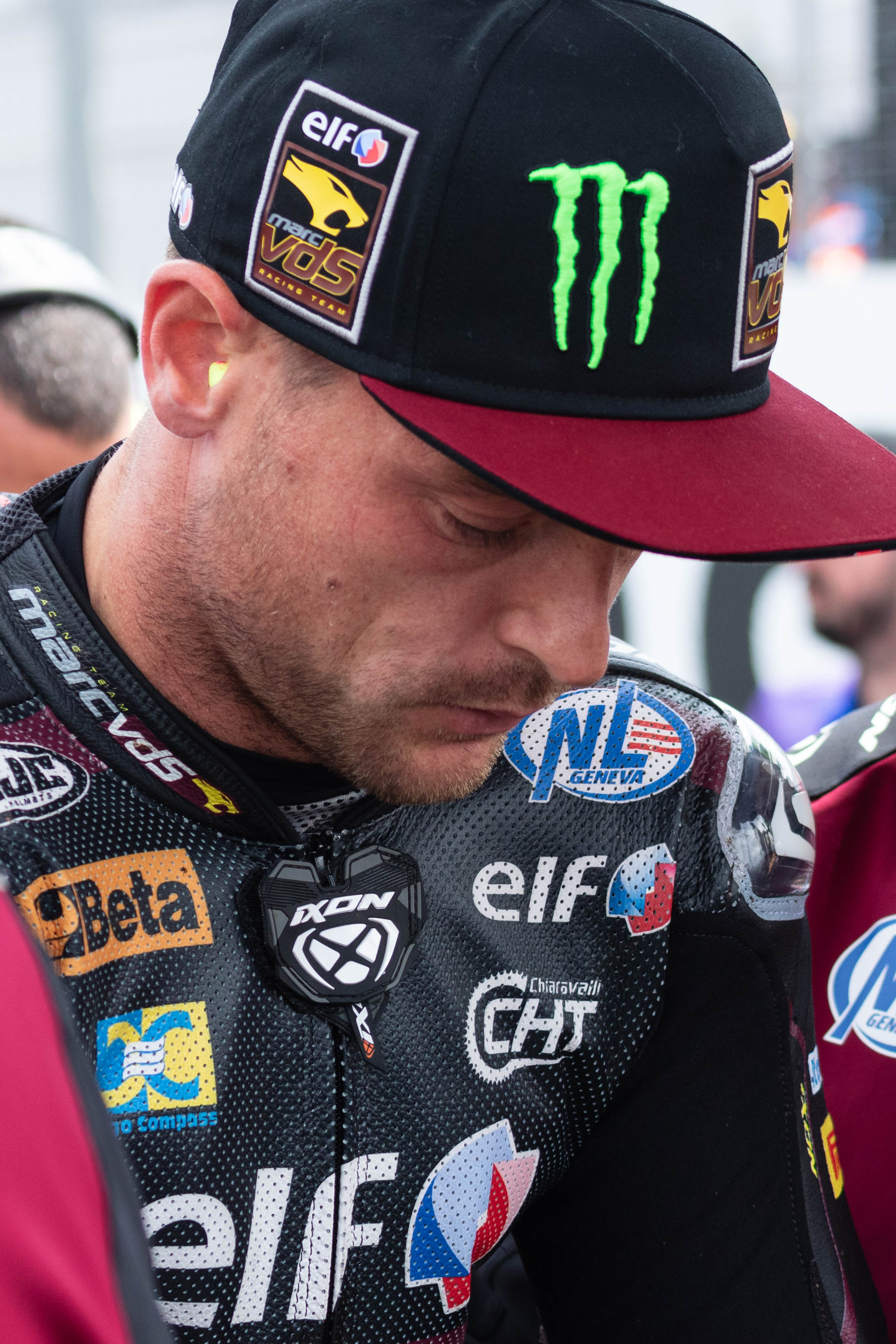
- Lowes in 2024
- Nationality: British
- Born: 14 September 1990 (age 36); Lincoln, Lincolnshire, England
- Current team: Elf Marc VDS Racing Team
- Bike number: 14
Motorcycle racing career statistics
MotoGP World Championship
Active years	2017
Manufacturers	Aprilia
Championships	0
2017 championship position	25th (5 pts)
Starts / Wins / Podiums / Poles / F. laps / Points; 18 / 0 / 0 / 0 / 0 / 5
Moto2 World Championship
Active years	2014–2016, 2018–2023
Manufacturers	Speed Up (2014–2015); Kalex (2016, 2019–2023); KTM (2018)
Championships	0
2023 championship position	12th (104 pts)
Starts / Wins / Podiums / Poles / F. laps / Points; 155 / 10 / 26 / 20 / 12 / 1090
Superbike World Championship
Active years	2024–
Manufacturers	Ducati
Championships	0
2026 championship position	4th (268 pts)
Starts / Wins / Podiums / Poles / F. laps / Points; 96 / 0 / 17 / 2 / 1 / 505
Supersport World Championship
Active years	2009–2013
Manufacturers	Honda (2009–2012); Yamaha (2013)
Championships	1 (2013)
2013 championship position	1st (250 pts)
Starts / Wins / Podiums / Poles / F. laps / Points; 43 / 8 / 23 / 13 / 9 / 557

Samuel Deane Lowes (born 14 September 1990) is a British motorcycle racer who competed in the Moto2 World Championship with ELF Marc VDS Racing Team aboard a Kalex since 2019. From 2024, Lowes remains with the same team ownership which moves into a new class of racing, World Superbikes, using a Ducati Panigale V4 R.

Lowes is the identical twin brother of World Superbike rider Alex Lowes, and in 2024, was the first time they have competed against one another on an international stage.

== Career ==
Lowes won the 2013 Supersport World Championship riding a Yamaha YZF-R6 for Russian team Yakhnich Motorsport, as well as the 2011 Race of the Year and the 2010 British Supersport Championship riding a Honda CBR600RR.

During his championship year in the British championship, Lowes scored five wins, including three consecutive wins and three pole positions, winning at Brands Hatch, Knockhill, Cadwell Park, Croft and Silverstone, along with five podium finishes. Afterwards, he moved to the Supersport World Championship full-time in 2011 signing for the Parkalgar Honda team. In his first complete year, he scored six podiums, finishing sixth overall with 129 points. In 2012, he moved to Bogdanka PTR Honda, a sister team of the Parkalgar Honda, and earned two wins at the Donington Park and Aragón rounds. In 2013, he moved to Yakhnich Motorsport riding a semi-works Yamaha.

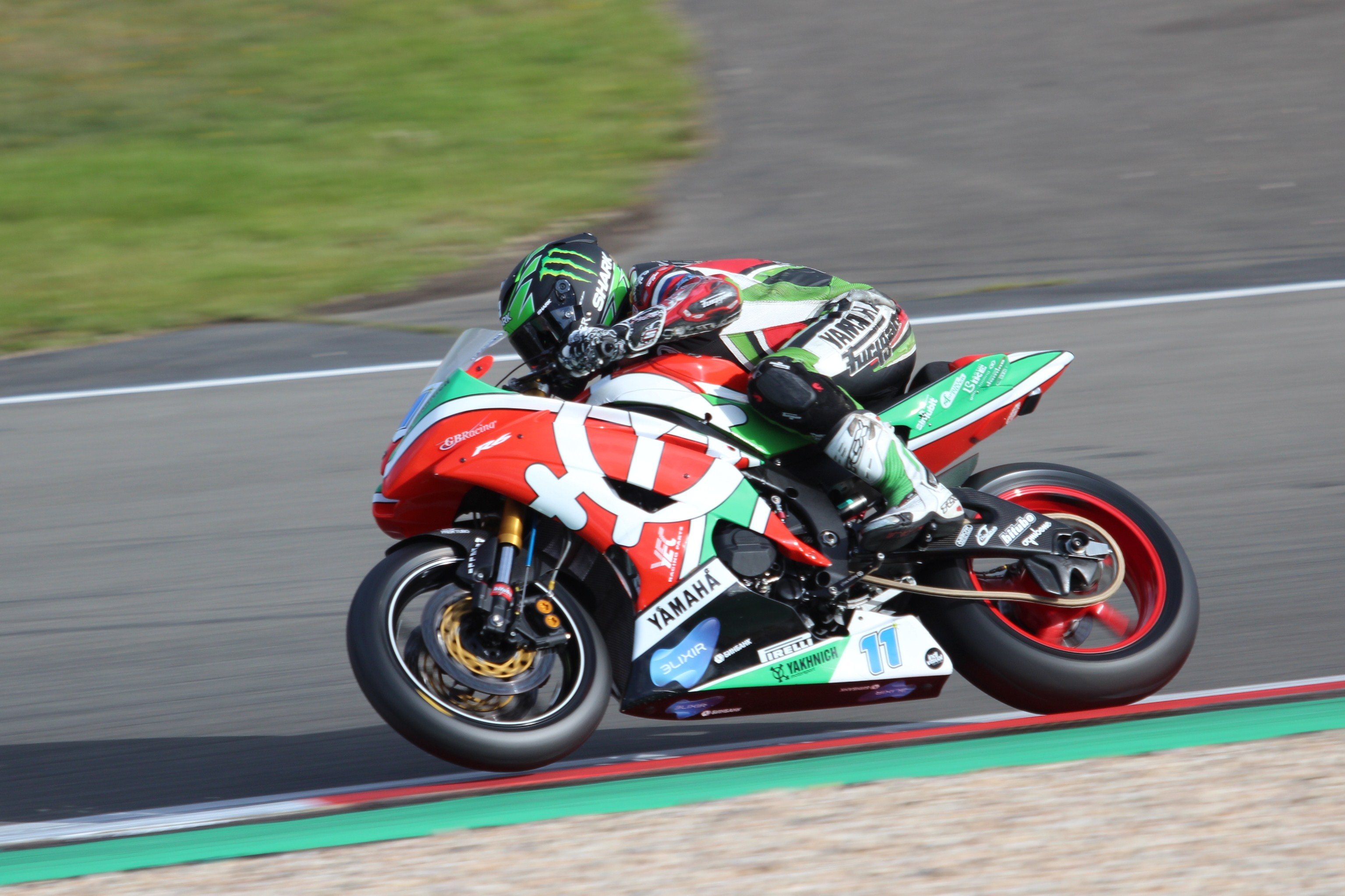
Lowes at the Nürburgring in 2013

Lowes claimed the World Supersport Championship in 2013 with one round remaining at Magny-Cours, finishing second in the race. He was scheduled to race in the World Superbike Championship in 2014 with Yakhnich, however, these plans fell through as the team decided to jump to the championship without Yamaha.

=== Moto2 World Championship ===
==== Speed Up Racing (2014–2015) ====
Instead, Lowes opted to join the Moto2 World Championship riding with the Speed Up team, signing a two-year deal with the team.

==== Federal Oil Gresini Moto2 (2016) ====
For 2016 onwards, Lowes signed a three-year contract backed by Aprilia, enabling him to continue in Moto2 for 2016 with the Gresini team and a change from Speed Up to Kalex chassis.

=== MotoGP World Championship ===
As well as this, Lowes had the added benefit of being Aprilia's official MotoGP test rider, but an anticipated move to compete for Aprilia in the premier MotoGP class for the 2017 and 2018 seasons was cut short by Aprilia exercising an early-release option announced half-way through the 2017 season, replacing him with Scott Redding for 2018.

=== Return to Moto2 ===
==== Swiss Innovative Investors (2018) ====
Lowes returned to Moto2 for the 2018 season, riding a KTM bike for the Swiss Innovative Investors team, partnering Iker Lecuona. He replaced Thomas Lüthi, who moved up to MotoGP with the EG 0,0 Marc VDS team. Lowes finished 16th in the riders' championship, scoring 49 points, and he failed to score a single fastest lap, podium, win, or pole position for the first time since he made his Moto2 début in 2014.

==== Return to Federal Oil Gresini Moto2 (2019) ====
On 21 August 2018, it was announced that Lowes would rejoin Gresini Racing for the 2019 season, replacing Jorge Navarro who will move to Speed Up.

==== Marc VDS Racing Team (2020–2023) ====
On 6 September 2019, it was announced Lowes would join Team Estrella Galicia 0,0 Marc VDS for 2020, where he would be partnering Alex Marquez. Alex Marquez eventually moved up to the MotoGP class and was replaced by Augusto Fernández.

Lowes suffered a significant shoulder injury at the British GP practice in August 2022, and was unable to race in October at the season penultimate event in Malaysia. He and his team decided to withdraw at the Sepang Circuit, and seek further advice from surgeon Lennard Funk, based in Manchester, England. It was confirmed in early November that Lowes would not compete at the last event of the 2022 season in Valencia, Spain.

=== Superbike World Championship ===
==== Marc VDS Racing Team (2024) ====
Lowes, along with Marc VDS, would compete in the Superbike World Championship in 2024 using a Ducati Panigale V4 R.

== Career statistics ==
2008 - 20th, European Superstock 600 Championship, Honda CBR600RR

=== European Superstock 600 ===
==== Races by year ====
(key) (Races in bold indicate pole position, races in italics indicate fastest lap)

Year	Bike	1	2	3	4	5	6	7	8	9	10	Pos	Pts
2008	Honda	VAL; 27	ASS; Ret	MNZ; 13	NÜR; 26	MIS; 20	BRN; 12	BRA; Ret	DON; 6	MAG; 22	POR; 28	20th	17

=== British Supersport Championship ===
==== Races by year ====
(key) (Races in bold indicate pole position, races in italics indicate fastest lap)

Year	Bike	1	2	3	4	5	6	7	8	9	10	11	12	Pos	Pts
2009	Honda	BHI; 10	OUL; Ret	DON; 13	THR; 19	SNE; 13	KNO; 10	MAL; 9	BHGP; 7	CAD; 6	CRO; DSQ	SIL	OUL; 10	14th	50
2010	Honda	BHI; 1	THR; Ret	OUL; 2	CAD; 3	MAL; 2	KNO; 1	SNE; 2	BHGP; 2	**CAD**; 1	**CRO**; 1	**SIL**; 1	OUL; 8	1st	229

=== Supersport World Championship ===
==== Races by year ====
(key) (Races in bold indicate pole position, races in italics indicate fastest lap)

Year	Bike	1	2	3	4	5	6	7	8	9	10	11	12	13	14	Pos	Pts
2009	Honda	AUS	QAT	SPA	NED	ITA	RSA	USA	SMR	GBR	CZE; 18	GER; 16	ITA; Ret	FRA; Ret	POR; Ret	NC	0
2010	Honda	AUS	POR	SPA	NED	ITA	RSA	USA	SMR	CZE	GBR; 10	GER	ITA	FRA		25th	6
2011	Honda	AUS; 3	EUR; Ret	NED; Ret	ITA; 5	**SMR**; 3	SPA; 2	CZE; 6	GBR; Ret	GER; 3	ITA; 2	FRA; 2	POR; Ret			6th	129
2012	Honda	AUS; 5	**ITA**; 2	**NED**; Ret	**ITA**; 2	EUR; 1	**SMR**; 18	SPA; 1	CZE; 4	GBR; 2	RUS; 12	GER; 13	POR; 5	FRA; 2		3rd	172
2013	Yamaha	**AUS**; 2	SPA; Ret	**NED**; 1	**ITA**; 1	**GBR**; 1	**POR**; 1	**ITA**; 2	RUS; C	**GBR**; 2	**GER**; 1	TUR; 2	FRA; 2	**SPA**; 1		1st	250

=== Superbike World Championship ===
==== Races by season ====
Season	Motorcycle	Team	Race	Win	Podium	Pole	FLap	Pts	Plcd
2024	Ducati Panigale V4 R	Elf Marc VDS Racing Team	30	0	0	0	0	53	18th
2025	Ducati Panigale V4 R	Elf Marc VDS Racing Team	30	0	5	2	0	184	8th
2026	Ducati Panigale V4 R	Elf Marc VDS Racing Team	36	0	12	0	1	268	4th
Total			**96**	**0**	**17**	**2**	**0**	**505**	

==== Races by year ====
(key) (Races in bold indicate pole position; races in italics indicate fastest lap)

Year	Bike	1			2			3			4			5			6			7			8			9			10			11			12			Pos	Pts
Year	Bike	R1	SR	R2	R1	SR	R2	R1	SR	R2	R1	SR	R2	R1	SR	R2	R1	SR	R2	R1	SR	R2	R1	SR	R2	R1	SR	R2	R1	SR	R2	R1	SR	R2	R1	SR	R2	Pos	Pts
2024	Ducati	AUS; 13	AUS; 8	AUS; 7	SPA; Ret	SPA; 11	SPA; 12	NED; 19	NED; 7	NED; 6	ITA; Ret	ITA; Ret	ITA; 13	GBR; Ret	GBR; Ret	GBR; 13	CZE; 12	CZE; Ret	CZE; DNS	POR	POR	POR	FRA; Ret	FRA; 16	FRA; Ret	ITA; Ret	ITA; 14	ITA; 11	SPA; Ret	SPA; DNS	SPA; DNS	POR; 13	POR; 15	POR; Ret	SPA; 13	SPA; 17	SPA; 14	18th	53
2025	Ducati	AUS; 10	AUS; 5	AUS; 6	POR; Ret	POR; 6	POR; 11	**NED**; Ret	**NED**; 2	NED; 4	ITA; 12	ITA; 4	ITA; 5	CZE; 6	CZE; 4	CZE; 4	EMI; 7	EMI; 6	EMI; 7	GBR; Ret	GBR; 3	GBR; Ret	HUN; Ret	HUN; 2	HUN; 3	FRA; 9	FRA; Ret	FRA; Ret	ARA; 3	ARA; 5	ARA; 19	POR; WD	POR; WD	POR; WD	SPA; DNS	SPA; DNS	SPA; DNS	8th	184
2026	Ducati	AUS; 5	AUS; 5	AUS; Ret	POR; 5	POR; 5	POR; 5	NED; 3	NED; 3	NED; 3	HUN; 9	HUN; 20	HUN; 6	CZE; Ret	CZE; 17	CZE; 12	ARA; 3	ARA; 3	ARA; 3	EMI; Ret	EMI; Ret	EMI; 10	GBR; 4	GBR; 3	GBR; 7	FRA; 3	FRA; Ret	FRA; 11	ITA; 3	ITA; 5	ITA; Ret	POR; 11	POR; 10	POR; 15	SPA; 2	SPA; 3	SPA; 3	4th	268

=== Grand Prix motorcycle racing ===
==== By season ====
Season	Class	Motorcycle	Team	Race	Win	Podium	Pole	FLap	Pts	Plcd
2014	Moto2	Speed Up	Speed Up Racing	18	0	0	0	0	69	13th
2015	Moto2	Speed Up	Speed Up Racing	18	1	5	3	1	186	4th
2016	Moto2	Kalex	Federal Oil Gresini Moto2	18	2	6	5	2	175	5th
2017	MotoGP	Aprilia	Aprilia Racing Team Gresini	18	0	0	0	0	5	25th
2018	Moto2	KTM	Swiss Innovative Investors	18	0	0	0	0	49	16th
2019	Moto2	Kalex	Federal Oil Gresini Moto2	19	0	0	0	0	66	16th
2020	Moto2	Kalex	EG 0,0 Marc VDS	14	3	7	3	3	196	**3rd**
2021	Moto2	Kalex	Elf Marc VDS Racing Team	18	3	5	6	3	190	4th
2022	Moto2	Kalex	Elf Marc VDS Racing Team	12	0	2	1	1	55	19th
2023	Moto2	Kalex	Elf Marc VDS Racing Team	20	1	1	2	2	104	12th
Total				**173**	**10**	**26**	**20**	**12**	**1095**	

==== By class ====
Class	Seasons	1st GP	1st pod	1st win	Race	Win	Podiums	Pole	FLap	Pts	WChmp
Moto2	2014–2016, 2018–2023	2014 Qatar	2015 Americas	2015 Americas	155	10	26	20	12	1090	0
MotoGP	2017	2017 Qatar			18	0	0	0	0	5	0
Total	2014–2023				**173**	**10**	**26**	**20**	**12**	**1095**	**0**

==== Races by year ====
(key) (Races in bold indicate pole position; races in italics indicate fastest lap)

Year	Class	Bike	1	2	3	4	5	6	7	8	9	10	11	12	13	14	15	16	17	18	19	20	Pos	Pts
2014	Moto2	Speed Up	QAT; 6	AME; 16	ARG; 8	SPA; Ret	FRA; 9	ITA; 8	CAT; Ret	NED; Ret	GER; 20	INP; 24	CZE; Ret	GBR; 7	RSM; 18	ARA; 9	JPN; Ret	AUS; 5	MAL; Ret	VAL; 7			13th	69
2015	Moto2	Speed Up	**QAT**; Ret	AME; 1	ARG; 3	SPA; 20	FRA; 4	**ITA**; 4	CAT; 4	NED; 3	GER; 5	INP; Ret	CZE; 5	**GBR**; 6	RSM; Ret	ARA; 3	JPN; 8	AUS; 2	MAL; 13	VAL; 5			4th	186
2016	Moto2	Kalex	QAT; 9	**ARG**; 2	AME; 2	**SPA**; 1	FRA; 6	**ITA**; 3	CAT; 6	NED; 4	GER; Ret	AUT; Ret	CZE; 3	**GBR**; 21	RSM; Ret	**ARA**; 1	JPN; Ret	AUS; Ret	MAL; Ret	VAL; 4			5th	175
2017	MotoGP	Aprilia	QAT; 18	ARG; Ret	AME; Ret	SPA; 16	FRA; 14	ITA; 19	CAT; 19	NED; Ret	GER; Ret	CZE; 18	AUT; 20	GBR; Ret	RSM; Ret	ARA; 22	JPN; 13	AUS; 19	MAL; Ret	VAL; Ret			25th	5
2018	Moto2	KTM	QAT; Ret	ARG; 13	AME; 24	SPA; 8	FRA; 13	ITA; Ret	CAT; 9	NED; 9	GER; 5	CZE; 9	AUT; Ret	GBR; C	RSM; Ret	ARA; 20	THA; Ret	JPN; 17	AUS; 14	MAL; 15	VAL; Ret		16th	49
2019	Moto2	Kalex	QAT; 6	ARG; Ret	AME; 7	SPA; Ret	FRA; Ret	ITA; 9	CAT; 9	NED; Ret	GER; 11	CZE; Ret	AUT; 24	GBR; Ret	RSM; 5	ARA; 5	THA; Ret	JPN; Ret	AUS; 20	MAL; Ret	VAL; 10		16th	66
2020	Moto2	Kalex	QAT; DNS	SPA; 4	ANC; 4	CZE; 2	AUT; 4	STY; DSQ	**RSM**; 8	EMI; 3	CAT; 2	FRA; 1	**ARA**; 1	**TER**; 1	EUR; Ret	VAL; 14	POR; 3						3rd	196
2021	Moto2	Kalex	**QAT**; 1	**DOH**; 1	**POR**; Ret	SPA; 3	FRA; Ret	ITA; Ret	CAT; 7	GER; 5	NED; 4	STY; 14	**AUT**; 4	GBR; 4	**ARA**; Ret	RSM; 4	AME; Ret	**EMI**; 1	ALR; 3	VAL; 7			4th	190
2022	Moto2	Kalex	QAT; 3	INA; 4	ARG; 10	AME; Ret	POR; Ret	SPA; Ret	FRA; DNS	ITA; Ret	CAT; Ret	**GER**; 3	NED; Ret	GBR; DNS	AUT	RSM	ARA	JPN; DNS	THA; 19	AUS; 12	MAL; DNS	VAL	19th	55
2023	Moto2	Kalex	POR; 7	ARG; 10	AME; 13	**SPA**; 1	**FRA**; 15	ITA; Ret	GER; 7	NED; 11	GBR; 7	AUT; Ret	CAT; 9	RSM; Ret	IND; 19	JPN; Ret	INA; 10	AUS; Ret	THA; 14	MAL; 7	QAT; 12	VAL; 7	12th	104
