= 2015 Motorcycle Grand Prix of the Americas =

(United States) 2015 Grand Prix of the Americas
Race details
- Race 2 of 18 races in the 2015 Grand Prix motorcycle racing season
- Date: April 12, 2015
- Official name: Red Bull Grand Prix of the Americas
- Location: Circuit of the Americas
- Course: Permanent racing facility; 5.513 km (3.426 mi)

MotoGP
Pole position
Rider	(Spain) Marc Márquez	Honda
Time	2:02.135	
Fastest lap
Rider	(Italy) Andrea Iannone	Ducati
Time	2:04.251 on lap 4	
Podium
First	(Spain) Marc Márquez	Honda
Second	(Italy) Andrea Dovizioso	Ducati
Third	(Italy) Valentino Rossi	Yamaha

Moto2
Pole position
Rider	(Belgium) Xavier Siméon	Kalex
Time	2:09.888	
Fastest lap
Rider	(United Kingdom) Sam Lowes	Speed Up
Time	2:10.578 on lap 18	
Podium
First	(United Kingdom) Sam Lowes	Speed Up
Second	(France) Johann Zarco	Kalex
Third	(Spain) Álex Rins	Kalex

Moto3
Pole position
Rider	(United Kingdom) Danny Kent	Honda
Time	2:15.344	
Fastest lap
Rider	(Portugal) Miguel Oliveira	KTM
Time	2:17.559 on lap 8	
Podium
First	(United Kingdom) Danny Kent	Honda
Second	(France) Fabio Quartararo	Honda
Third	(Spain) Efrén Vázquez	Honda

The 2015 Motorcycle Grand Prix of the Americas was the second round of the 2015 Grand Prix motorcycle racing season. It was held at the Circuit of the Americas in Elroy on April 12, 2015.

In the MotoGP class, Repsol Honda's Marc Márquez took his first pole position of the season, and he ultimately went on to win the race, his third victory in as many years at the circuit. For the first time since the 2014 Aragon Grand Prix, three different manufacturers were represented on the podium; behind Márquez was Ducati's Andrea Dovizioso, who prevailed in a battle with Yamaha's Valentino Rossi, who finished in third place. In his 200th premier class start, local hero Nicky Hayden could only finish in thirteenth, while numerous riders retired from the race – Pol Espargaró collided with Scott Redding, with caused both riders to retire from the race, while Yonny Hernández, Mike Di Meglio and Stefan Bradl all crashed before the halfway mark. In the Moto3 race, a young Fabio Quartararo achieved his first ever World Championship podium in his second race in debut season.

== Classification ==
=== MotoGP ===
The race start was delayed due to a water spillage at Turn 3, and ultimately started at 14:37 local time.

Pos.	No.	Rider	Team	Manufacturer	Laps	Time/Retired	Grid	Points
1	93	(Spain) Marc Márquez	Repsol Honda Team	Honda	21	43:47.150	1	25
2	4	(Italy) Andrea Dovizioso	Ducati Team	Ducati	21	+2.354	2	20
3	46	(Italy) Valentino Rossi	Movistar Yamaha MotoGP	Yamaha	21	+3.120	4	16
4	99	(Spain) Jorge Lorenzo	Movistar Yamaha MotoGP	Yamaha	21	+6.682	3	13
5	29	(Italy) Andrea Iannone	Ducati Team	Ducati	21	+7.584	7	11
6	38	(United Kingdom) Bradley Smith	Monster Yamaha Tech 3	Yamaha	21	+10.557	10	10
7	35	(United Kingdom) Cal Crutchlow	CWM LCR Honda	Honda	21	+16.967	5	9
8	41	(Spain) Aleix Espargaró	Team Suzuki Ecstar	Suzuki	21	+19.025	8	8
9	25	(Spain) Maverick Viñales	Team Suzuki Ecstar	Suzuki	21	+38.570	12	7
10	9	(Italy) Danilo Petrucci	Pramac Racing	Ducati	21	+41.796	11	6
11	7	(Japan) Hiroshi Aoyama	Repsol Honda Team	Honda	21	+47.199	18	5
12	8	(Spain) Héctor Barberá	Avintia Racing	Ducati	21	+47.339	13	4
13	69	(United States) Nicky Hayden	Aspar MotoGP Team	Honda	21	+56.484	22	3
14	43	(Australia) Jack Miller	CWM LCR Honda	Honda	21	+56.731	19	2
15	19	(Spain) Álvaro Bautista	Aprilia Racing Team Gresini	Aprilia	21	+57.372	23	1
16	50	(Republic of Ireland) Eugene Laverty	Aspar MotoGP Team	Honda	21	+58.898	17	
17	76	(France) Loris Baz	Athinà Forward Racing	Yamaha Forward	21	+1:08.787	20	
18	15	(San Marino) Alex de Angelis	Octo IodaRacing Team	ART	21	+1:22.236	24	
Ret	17	(Czech Republic) Karel Abraham	AB Motoracing	Honda	16	Retirement	21	
Ret	33	(Italy) Marco Melandri	Aprilia Racing Team Gresini	Aprilia	10	Retirement	25	
Ret	68	(Colombia) Yonny Hernández	Pramac Racing	Ducati	6	Accident	15	
Ret	63	(France) Mike Di Meglio	Avintia Racing	Ducati	6	Accident	16	
Ret	45	(United Kingdom) Scott Redding	EG 0,0 Marc VDS	Honda	5	Retirement	6	
Ret	6	(Germany) Stefan Bradl	Athinà Forward Racing	Yamaha Forward	3	Accident	14	
Ret	44	(Spain) Pol Espargaró	Monster Yamaha Tech 3	Yamaha	0	Accident	9	

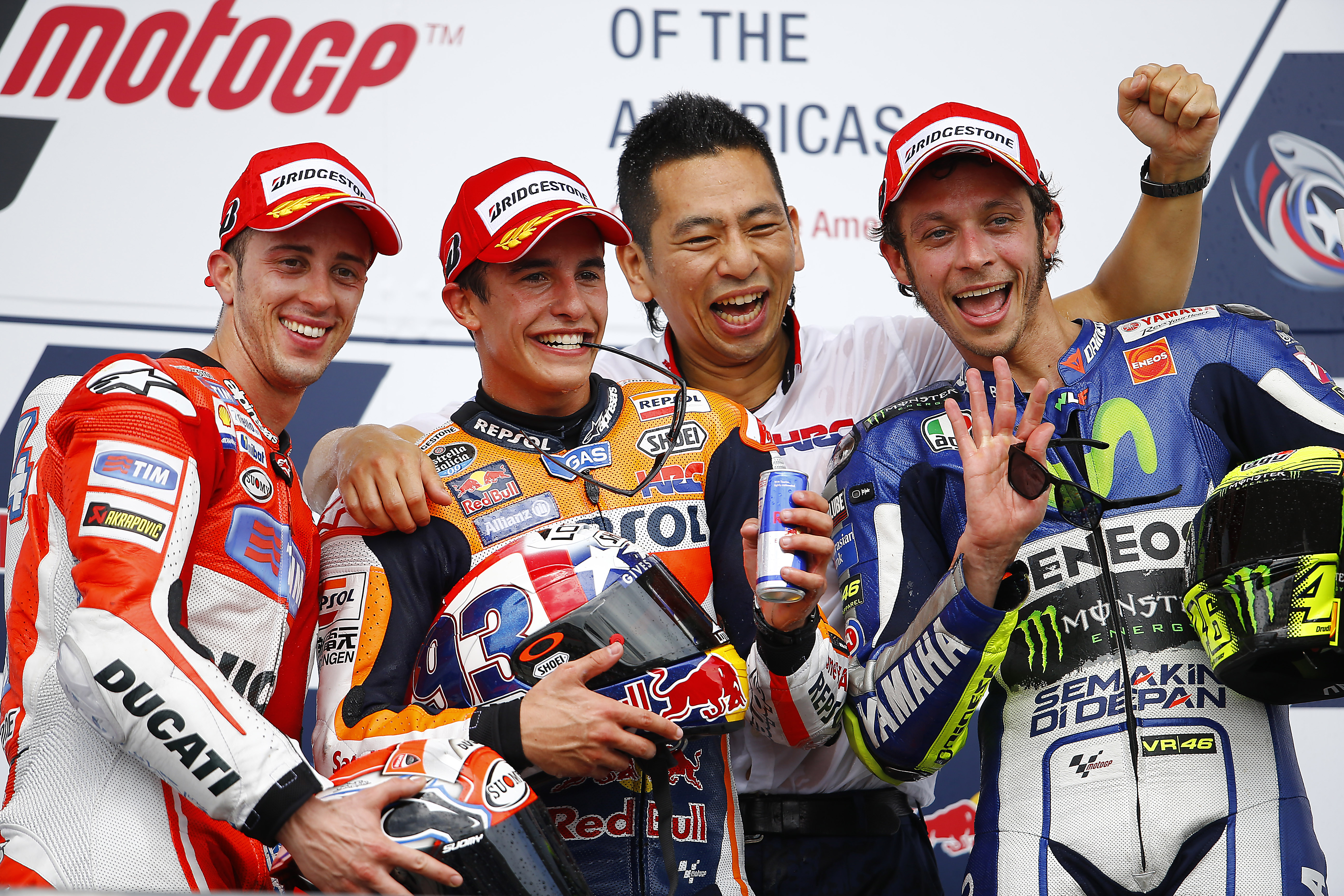
Andrea Dovizioso, Marc Márquez and Valentino Rossi, celebrating on the podium after they finished second, first and third at the MotoGP race.

=== Moto2 ===
Pos.	No.	Rider	Manufacturer	Laps	Time/Retired	Grid	Points
1	22	(United Kingdom) Sam Lowes	Speed Up	19	41:45.565	2	25
2	5	(France) Johann Zarco	Kalex	19	+1.999	4	20
3	40	(Spain) Álex Rins	Kalex	19	+4.622	8	16
4	1	(Spain) Tito Rabat	Kalex	19	+8.975	3	13
5	21	(Italy) Franco Morbidelli	Kalex	19	+12.976	5	11
6	55	(Malaysia) Hafizh Syahrin	Kalex	19	+14.168	15	10
7	95	(Australia) Anthony West	Speed Up	19	+17.271	13	9
8	36	(Finland) Mika Kallio	Kalex	19	+17.513	11	8
9	60	(Spain) Julián Simón	Speed Up	19	+17.689	7	7
10	30	(Japan) Takaaki Nakagami	Kalex	19	+17.764	6	6
11	3	(Italy) Simone Corsi	Kalex	19	+17.982	12	5
12	12	(Switzerland) Thomas Lüthi	Kalex	19	+24.824	17	4
13	23	(Germany) Marcel Schrötter	Tech 3	19	+26.016	10	3
14	11	(Germany) Sandro Cortese	Kalex	19	+27.456	16	2
15	73	(Spain) Álex Márquez	Kalex	19	+28.568	23	1
16	94	(Germany) Jonas Folger	Kalex	19	+29.889	19	
17	88	(Spain) Ricard Cardús	Tech 3	19	+36.405	20	
18	77	(Switzerland) Dominique Aegerter	Kalex	19	+38.693	9	
19	25	(Malaysia) Azlan Shah	Kalex	19	+40.581	24	
20	70	(Switzerland) Robin Mulhauser	Kalex	19	+41.504	25	
21	4	(Switzerland) Randy Krummenacher	Kalex	19	+50.471	18	
22	96	(France) Louis Rossi	Tech 3	19	+1:08.825	22	
23	10	(Thailand) Thitipong Warokorn	Kalex	19	+1:10.990	26	
24	2	(Switzerland) Jesko Raffin	Kalex	19	+1:11.138	29	
25	66	(Germany) Florian Alt	Suter	19	+1:19.442	27	
26	7	(Italy) Lorenzo Baldassarri	Kalex	19	+1:25.405	21	
27	39	(Spain) Luis Salom	Kalex	19	+1:32.876	14	
Ret	19	(Belgium) Xavier Siméon	Kalex	15	Accident	1	
Ret	51	(Malaysia) Zaqhwan Zaidi	Suter	12	Retirement	28	
DNS	49	(Spain) Axel Pons	Kalex		Did not start		
OFFICIAL MOTO2 REPORT

=== Moto3 ===
Pos.	No.	Rider	Manufacturer	Laps	Time/Retired	Grid	Points
1	52	(United Kingdom) Danny Kent	Honda	18	41:32.287	1	25
2	20	(France) Fabio Quartararo	Honda	18	+8.532	6	20
3	7	(Spain) Efrén Vázquez	Honda	18	+8.652	16	16
4	33	(Italy) Enea Bastianini	Honda	18	+8.811	8	13
5	41	(South Africa) Brad Binder	KTM	18	+9.556	11	11
6	17	(United Kingdom) John McPhee	Honda	18	+13.869	15	10
7	55	(Italy) Andrea Locatelli	Honda	18	+20.442	3	9
8	5	(Italy) Romano Fenati	KTM	18	+20.611	19	8
9	32	(Spain) Isaac Viñales	Husqvarna	18	+20.863	7	7
10	98	(Czech Republic) Karel Hanika	KTM	18	+20.913	20	6
11	84	(Czech Republic) Jakub Kornfeil	KTM	18	+21.249	23	5
12	16	(Italy) Andrea Migno	KTM	18	+23.725	22	4
13	65	(Germany) Philipp Öttl	KTM	18	+32.218	32	3
14	31	(Finland) Niklas Ajo	KTM	18	+36.702	21	2
15	12	(Italy) Matteo Ferrari	Mahindra	18	+37.283	24	1
16	10	(France) Alexis Masbou	Honda	18	+47.027	10	
17	6	(Spain) María Herrera	Husqvarna	18	+59.257	31	
18	2	(Australia) Remy Gardner	Mahindra	18	+1:03.748	27	
19	91	(Argentina) Gabriel Rodrigo	KTM	18	+1:04.611	30	
20	63	(Malaysia) Zulfahmi Khairuddin	KTM	18	+1:16.968	28	
21	19	(Italy) Alessandro Tonucci	Mahindra	18	+1:27.397	26	
22	22	(Spain) Ana Carrasco	KTM	18	+1:40.409	33	
23	23	(Italy) Niccolò Antonelli	Honda	18	+1:43.841	4	
24	29	(Italy) Stefano Manzi	Mahindra	18	+1:46.105	25	
25	11	(Belgium) Livio Loi	Honda	17	+1 lap	14	
Ret	24	(Japan) Tatsuki Suzuki	Mahindra	17	Retirement	29	
Ret	44	(Portugal) Miguel Oliveira	KTM	10	Accident	2	
Ret	21	(Italy) Francesco Bagnaia	Mahindra	9	Accident	9	
Ret	9	(Spain) Jorge Navarro	Honda	9	Accident	5	
Ret	88	(Spain) Jorge Martín	Mahindra	8	Retirement	12	
Ret	76	(Japan) Hiroki Ono	Honda	6	Accident	17	
Ret	95	(France) Jules Danilo	Honda	5	Accident	18	
Ret	40	(South Africa) Darryn Binder	Mahindra	1	Accident	34	
Ret	58	(Spain) Juan Francisco Guevara	Mahindra	0	Accident	13	
OFFICIAL MOTO3 REPORT

== Championship standings after the race (MotoGP) ==
Below are the standings for the top five riders and constructors after round two has concluded.

Riders' Championship standings

Pos.	Rider	Points
1	(Italy) Valentino Rossi	41
2	(Italy) Andrea Dovizioso	40
3	(Spain) Marc Márquez	36
4	(Italy) Andrea Iannone	27
5	(Spain) Jorge Lorenzo	26

Constructors' Championship standings

Pos.	Constructor	Points
1	(Japan) Yamaha	41
2	(Italy) Ducati	40
3	(Japan) Honda	36
4	(Japan) Suzuki	13
5	(Italy) Aprilia	1

Teams' Championship standings

Pos.	Team	Points
1	(Japan) Movistar Yamaha MotoGP	67
2	(Italy) Ducati Team	67
3	(Japan) Repsol Honda Team	51
4	(France) Monster Yamaha Tech 3	25
5	(Japan) Team Suzuki Ecstar	22

- Note: Only the top five positions are included for both sets of standings.

Previous race: 2015 Qatar Grand Prix	FIM Grand Prix World Championship; 2015 season	Next race: 2015 Argentine Grand Prix
Previous race: 2014 Grand Prix of the Americas	Motorcycle Grand Prix of the Americas	Next race: 2016 Grand Prix of the Americas
