= 2011 CEV 125cc season =

Junior Motorcycle World Championship

2011 FIM JuniorGP World Championship
Previous:	2010	Next:	2012
Support series: CEV Moto2

The 2011 CEV 125GP is the fourteenth and final season of the CEV 125GP season before the class switches from 125cc machinery to Moto3. This season saw various teams racing with the Moto3 bike for the final three rounds. Those who race on a Moto3 bike are not eligible to score points. The season was held over 7 races at 7 meetings, beginning on 17 April at Circuito de Jerez and finished on 20 November also at Circuito de Jerez.

Álex Rins won the title after beating closest rival and teammate Álex Márquez by 12 points.

== Calendar ==
2011 Calendar
Round	Date	Circuit	Pole position	Fastest lap	Race winner	Winning team	Winning constructor
1	17 April	(Spain) Jerez 1	(Spain) Álex Rins	(Spain) Álex Rins	(Spain) Álex Rins	(Spain) Team Catalunya Caixa Repsol	(Spain) Derbi
2	8 May	(Spain) Aragón	(Spain) Álex Rins	(Spain) Álex Rins	(Spain) Álex Márquez	(Spain) Team Catalunya Caixa Repsol	(Spain) Derbi
3	19 June	(Spain) Catalunya	(Spain) Álex Rins	(Spain) Álex Márquez	(Spain) Álex Rins	(Spain) Team Catalunya Caixa Repsol	(Spain) Derbi
4	10 July	(Spain) Albacete 1	(Italy) Francesco Bagnaia	(Spain) Álex Rins	(Spain) Álex Márquez	(Spain) Team Catalunya Caixa Repsol	(Spain) Derbi
5	11 September	(Spain) Albacete 2	(Spain) Álex Rins	(Spain) Álex Rins	(Italy) Francesco Bagnaia	(Spain) Team Catalunya Caixa Repsol	(Spain) Derbi
6	13 November	(Spain) Valencia	(Portugal) Miguel Oliveira	(Portugal) Miguel Oliveira	(Portugal) Miguel Oliveira	(Spain) Monlau Engineering	(Japan) Honda
7	20 November	(Spain) Jerez 2	(Portugal) Miguel Oliveira	(Japan) Kenta Fujii	(Portugal) Miguel Oliveira	(Spain) Monlau Engineering	(Japan) Honda

== Entry list ==
Team	Constructor	No.	Rider	Rounds
125cc
(Italy) Agora Racing - Curvacero	Aprilia	10	(Italy) Andrea Migno	6–7
(Australia) BRP Racing	Aprilia	18	(Australia) Samuel Rankin	All
(Spain) Curvacero	Aprilia	9	(Spain) Jorge Navarro	All
(Italy) Ellegi Racing	Aprilia	47	(Italy) Federico Fuligni	7
(Italy) Ellegi Racing	Aprilia	79	(Italy) Andrea Mantovani	3
(Italy) Ellegi Racing	Aprilia	93	(France) Christophe Arciero	6–7
(Italy) Ellegi Racing	Aprilia	95	(Czech Republic) Miroslav Popov	3, 6–7
(Italy) Faenza Racing	Aprilia	88	(Italy) Massimo Parziani	1–4, 6–7
(Spain) H43 Hernandez	Aprilia	44	(United Kingdom) Matt Davies	5
(Spain) Heavy Rent Racing	Aprilia	27	(Spain) Sergio Mora	3–4
(Spain) Hype Energy Drink-Team DVJ; Turismo de Aragon-DVJ	Aprilia	32	(Spain) Ana Carrasco	All
(Spain) Hype Energy Drink-Team DVJ; Turismo de Aragon-DVJ	Aprilia	37	(Spain) Pedro Rodríguez	All
(United Kingdom) KRP Racing Steps Foundation	Aprilia	17	(United Kingdom) John McPhee	All
(United Kingdom) KRP Racing Steps Foundation	Aprilia	89	(United Kingdom) Fraser Rogers	1–2, 4–7
(United Kingdom) KRP Racing Steps Foundation	Aprilia	98	(United Kingdom) Wayne Ryan	6–7
(Spain) MIR Racing	Aprilia	57	(Brazil) Eric Granado	All
(Spain) Profdental 43	Aprilia	64	(Spain) Sara Sánchez	7
(France) Provence Moto Sport	Aprilia	97	(France) Alan Techer	1–2
(France) Provence Moto Sport	Aprilia	99	(France) Morgan Berchet	1–4
(United Kingdom) PWR/Sandbach Scrap Metal	Aprilia	45	(United Kingdom) Philip Wakefield	7
(United Kingdom) Quelch PGS Racing	Aprilia	70	(United Kingdom) Rowan Miller	1, 3
(Germany) RZT-Racing	Aprilia	20	(Germany) Luca Amato	1, 4–5
(Germany) RZT-Racing	Aprilia	43	(Australia) Jack Miller	1, 4–5
(Spain) Team Bradol	Aprilia	19	(Spain) Alejandro Esteban	1–3
(Italy) Team Italia Gabrielli	Aprilia	15	(Italy) Romano Fenati	1–4
(Italy) Team Italia Gabrielli	Aprilia	59	(Italy) Niccolò Antonelli	1–4, 6–7
(Italy) Team Italia Gabrielli	Aprilia	87	(Italy) Paolo Giacomini	1–4
(Spain) Team Murcia Pramac	Aprilia	58	(Spain) Juan Francisco Guevara	All
(Spain) Team Quinto Almoradi	Aprilia	40	(Spain) Aitor Cremades	1–3, 5–7
(Spain) Tey Racing	Aprilia	50	(Italy) Manuel Tatasciore	2–3
(Spain) Wild Wolf-RACC MS	Aprilia	11	(Spain) Albert Arenas	1–3, 5–7
(Spain) Wild Wolf-RACC MS	Aprilia	24	(Spain) Rubén González	All
(Spain) Wild Wolf-RACC MS	Aprilia	28	(Spain) Josep Rodríguez	All
(San Marino) / (India) WTR-Ten10 Racing	Aprilia	14	(India) Sarath Kumar	1–2
(San Marino) / (India) WTR-Ten10 Racing	Aprilia	34	(Italy) Francesco Mauriello	1–2
(Finland) Avant Tecno Racing; Red Bull Ajo Motorsport	Derbi	31	(Finland) Niklas Ajo	6
(Finland) Avant Tecno Racing; Red Bull Ajo Motorsport	Derbi	61	(Australia) Arthur Sissis	6
(Spain) Team Catalunya Caixa Repsol	Derbi	23	(Spain) Álex Márquez	All
(Spain) Team Catalunya Caixa Repsol	Derbi	41	(Italy) Francesco Bagnaia	All
(Spain) Team Catalunya Caixa Repsol	Derbi	42	(Spain) Álex Rins	All
(Netherlands) Dutch Racing Team	Honda	94	(Netherlands) Bryan Schouten	6
Equipe de France Vitesse Espoir	Honda	30	(France) Enzo Boulom	6
Equipe de France Vitesse Espoir	Honda	60	(France) Enzo Boulom	5
Equipe de France Vitesse Espoir	Honda	60	(France) Renald Castillon	3–4
Equipe de France Vitesse Espoir	Honda	90	(France) Guillaume Raymond	7
(United Kingdom) KRP/Racing Steps Foundation	Honda	98	(United Kingdom) Wayne Ryan	1
(Spain) Larresport	Honda	21	(Spain) Javier Orellana	6–7
(Spain) Larresport	Honda	22	(Spain) Daniel Ruiz	All
(Spain) LKV-SAG	Honda	16	(Spain) Agusti Levy	1–6
(Spain) Promomedia Team	Honda	51	(Spain) Josep Garcia	5
(Spain) RCSport	Honda	33	(Argentina) Fausto Grantón	6–7
(United Kingdom) SP125 Racing	Honda	13	(United Kingdom) Rob Guiver	6–7
(United Kingdom) SP125 Racing	Honda	82	(United Kingdom) Bradley Ray	6–7
(Spain) Spirit Racing Team	Honda	69	(Spain) Javier Martinez	1–2
(Japan) Team Nobby	Honda	91	(Japan) Shunya Mori	1–4, 6–7
(United Kingdom) Team RS Racing	Honda	77	(United Kingdom) Kyle Ryde	6–7
(Italy) VFT Racing	Honda	35	(Spain) Vicente Juanes	6
(Germany) Freudenberg Racing	KTM	66	(Germany) Florian Alt	7
(France) Furyjunior Team	KTM	46	(France) Jules Danilo	6
(Germany) Team HP-Moto	KTM	65	(Germany) Philipp Öttl	6–7
(Germany) Team HP-Moto	KTM	72	(Switzerland) Jesko Raffin	6–7
Moto3
(Spain) 250 4T	Honda	55	(Spain) Alejandro Medina	6
(France) CIP-TSR	Honda	51	(Japan) Kenta Fujii	6–7
(Spain) Grifull-02 Honda	Honda	75	(Spain) Francisco García	6–7
(Spain) Monlau Engineering	Honda	44	(Portugal) Miguel Oliveira	6–7
(Spain) RACC Honda	Honda	97	(Spain) Xavi Vierge	6–7
(Spain) Team JJ Sáez-Motorrad	Moriwaki	26	(Spain) Daniel Sáez	5–7
(United Kingdom) RS Distribution	Yamaha	14	(France) Pierre Ginieys	6

== Championship standings ==
Pos.	Rider	Bike	JER 1 (Spain)	ARA (Spain)	CAT (Spain)	ALB 1 (Spain)	ALB 2 (Spain)	VAL (Spain)	JER 2 (Spain)	Pts
1	(Spain) Álex Rins	Derbi	1^{P}^{F}	2^{P}^{F}	1^{P}	3^{F}	Ret^{P}^{F}	3	17	102
2	(Spain) Álex Márquez	Derbi	2	1	Ret^{F}	1	Ret	2	Ret	90
3	(Italy) Francesco Bagnaia	Derbi	7	7	16	2^{P}	1	5	Ret	74
4	(Italy) Niccolò Antonelli	Aprilia	Ret	6	9	6		4	1	65
5	(Brazil) Eric Granado	Aprilia	5	9	4	10	6	7	13	59
6	(Spain) Jorge Navarro	Aprilia	3	3	Ret	7	3	14	Ret	57
7	(Italy) Romano Fenati	Aprilia	4	4	3	4				55
8	(Spain) Josep Rodríguez	Aprilia	DNS	5	Ret	12	4	1	Ret	53
9	(Spain) Juan Francisco Guevara	Aprilia	6	11	5	5	9	Ret	10	50
10	(United Kingdom) John McPhee	Aprilia	8	10	Ret	Ret	8	Ret	3	38
11	(Australia) Jack Miller	Aprilia	11			7	2			34
12	(Italy) Massimo Parziani	Aprilia	12	8	Ret	11		8	7	34
13	(Spain) Ana Carrasco	Aprilia	10	Ret	7	Ret	10	29	11	26
14	(Italy) Andrea Migno	Aprilia						12	2	24
15	(Japan) Shunya Mori	Honda	Ret	19	6	14		23	5	23
16	(Spain) Albert Arenas	Aprilia	17	15	DNS		5	Ret	6	22
17	(Czech Republic) Miroslav Popov	Aprilia			2			20	DNS	20
18	(United Kingdom) Fraser Rogers	Aprilia	19	14		13	7	10	Ret	20
19	(United Kingdom) Kyle Ryde	Honda						11	4	18
20	(Germany) Luca Amato	Aprilia	9			8	Ret			15
21	(Spain) Daniel Ruiz	Honda	13	17	8	15	Ret	19	Ret	12
22	(Spain) Pedro Rodríguez	Aprilia	14	16	11	17	12	18	19	11
23	(Australia) Arthur Sissis	Derbi						6		10
24	(Germany) Philipp Öttl	KTM						22	8	8
25	(France) Guillaume Raymond	Honda							9	7
26	(United Kingdom) Wayne Ryan	Honda	21							7
26	(United Kingdom) Wayne Ryan	Aprilia						9	Ret	7
27	(Italy) Andrea Mantovani	Aprilia			10					6
28	(Spain) Josep Garcia	Honda					11			5
29	(United Kingdom) Rob Guiver	Honda						16	12	4
30	(France) Morgan Berchet	Aprilia	24	Ret	12	19				4
31	(Italy) Francesco Mauriello	Aprilia	16	12						4
32	(Netherlands) Bryan Schouten	Honda						13		3
33	(Italy) Paolo Giacomini	Aprilia	18	13	19	16				3
34	(Spain) Agusti Levy	Honda	23	18	17	20	13	Ret		3
35	(France) Renald Castillon	Honda			13	Ret				3
36	(Spain) Rubén González	Aprilia	22	Ret	14	18	15	17	Ret	3
37	(Spain) Sara Sánchez	Aprilia							14	2
38	(France) Enzo Boulom	Honda					14	26		2
39	(Germany) Florian Alt	KTM							15	1
40	(United Kingdom) Bradley Ray	Honda						15	Ret	1
41	(Spain) Sergio Mora	Aprilia			15	Ret				1
42	(France) Alan Techer	Aprilia	15	Ret						1
	(Switzerland) Jesko Raffin	KTM						24	16	0
	(Spain) Aitor Cremades	Aprilia	20	20	18		Ret	28	18	0
	(Spain) Alejandro Esteban	Aprilia	25	21	20					0
	(France) Jules Danilo	KTM						25		0
	(India) Sarath Kumar	Aprilia	26	Ret						0
	(France) Christophe Arciero	Aprilia						27	Ret	0
	(Australia) Samuel Rankin	Aprilia	Ret	Ret	DNS	DNQ	Ret	30	Ret	0
	(Argentina) Fausto Grantón	Honda						31	Ret	0
	(Spain) Javier Martinez	Honda	Ret	DNQ						0
	(Italy) Manuel Tatasciore	Aprilia		Ret	Ret					0
	(Spain) Javier Orellana	Honda						DNS	Ret	0
	(Spain) Vicente Juanes	Honda						Ret		0
	(Italy) Federico Fuligni	Aprilia							Ret	0
	(United Kingdom) Philip Wakefield	Aprilia							Ret	0
	(United Kingdom) Matt Davies	Aprilia					DNS			
	(Finland) Niklas Ajo	Derbi						DNS		
	(United Kingdom) Rowan Miller	Aprilia	DNQ		DNQ					
Riders ineligible for points due to competing in a Moto3 bike
-	(Portugal) Miguel Oliveira	Honda						1^{P}^{F}	4^{P}	-
-	(Japan) Kenta Fujii	Honda						13	4^{F}	-
-	(Spain) Daniel Sáez	Moriwaki					Ret	37	14	-
-	(Spain) Xavi Vierge	Honda						18	Ret	-
-	(Spain) Francisco García	Honda						20	Ret	-
-	(Spain) Alejandro Medina	Honda						34		-
-	(France) Pierre Ginieys	Yamaha						DNQ		-
Pos.	Rider	Bike	JER 1 (Spain)	ARA (Spain)	CAT (Spain)	ALB 1 (Spain)	ALB 2 (Spain)	VAL (Spain)	JER 2 (Spain)	Pts

Colour	Result
Gold	Winner
Silver	Second place
Bronze	Third place
Green	Points classification
Blue	Non-points classification
Blue	Non-classified finish (NC)
Purple	Retired, not classified (Ret)
Red	Did not qualify (DNQ)
Red	Did not pre-qualify (DNPQ)
Black	Disqualified (DSQ)
White	Did not start (DNS)
White	Withdrew (WD)
White	Race cancelled (C)
Blank	Did not practice (DNP)
Blank	Did not arrive (DNA)
Blank	Excluded (EX)

P – Pole position
F – Fastest lap
