= McFee =

McFee is a surname. Notable people with the surname include:

- Allan McFee (1913–2000), often irreverent announcer for the Canadian Broadcasting Corporation's radio and TV networks
- Bruce McFee (born 1961), Scottish politician
- Henry Lee McFee (1886–1953), pioneer American cubist painter and a prominent member of the Woodstock artists colony
- John McFee (born 1950), American singer, songwriter, guitarist and multi-instrumentalist
- June King McFee (died 2008), contributor to the world of art education, with her research and publications
- Malcolm McFee (1940–2001), English TV and film actor
- Michael McFee, poet and essayist from Asheville, North Carolina
- Oonah McFee (1916–2006), award-winning Canadian novelist and short story writer
- William McFee (1881–1966), writer of sea stories

== See also ==
- Joel McFee Pritchard (1925–1997), Republican politician from Washington
- McAfee
- McPhee
