= McDuffee =

McDuffee or MacDuffee is a surname of Scottish and Irish origin, which is a variant of McDuffie or MacDuffie. The name is an Anglicization of the Gaelic Mac Duibhshíthe ("son of Duibhshíth"), which means "black peace". McDuffee may refer to:

- Cyrus Colton MacDuffee (1895–1961), American mathematician
- Willis McDuffee (1868–1934), American newspaper editor

== See also ==
- Latimer–MacDuffee theorem
- McDuffie
