= 2011 British 125 Championship =

The 2011 British 125 Championship season was the 24th British 125cc Championship season. A support category for the British Superbike Championship, the 125cc category was the only two-stroke class left in the British Superbike Championship.

== Calendar ==
2011 Calendar
Round	Circuit	Date	Pole position	Fastest lap	Winning rider	Winning team
1	(England) Brands Hatch Indy	25 April	(England) Kyle Ryde	(England) Kyle Ryde	(England) Luke Hedger	Banks Racing Team
2	(England) Oulton Park	2 May	(England) Rob Guiver	(England) Luke Hedger	(England) Rob Guiver	SP125/Brookhouse Garage Racing
3	(England) Croft	15 May	(England) Kyle Ryde	(England) Kyle Ryde	(England) Rob Guiver	SP125/Brookhouse Garage Racing
4	(England) Thruxton	30 May	(England) Rob Guiver	(England) Rob Guiver	(England) Rob Guiver	SP125/Brookhouse Garage Racing
5	(Scotland) Knockhill	19 June	(England) Wayne Ryan	(England) Kyle Ryde	(England) Kyle Ryde	R S Racing
6	(England) Snetterton 300	3 July	(England) Rob Guiver	(England) Wayne Ryan	(England) Wayne Ryan	KRP/Racing Steps Foundation
7	(England) Oulton Park	17 July	(England) Rob Guiver	(Australia) Matt Davies	(Australia) Matt Davies	KRP
8	(England) Brands Hatch GP	7 August	(Scotland) John McPhee	(England) Kyle Ryde	(England) Kyle Ryde	R S Racing
9	(England) Cadwell Park	29 August	(England) Rob Guiver	(England) Kyle Ryde	(England) Kyle Ryde	R S Racing
10	(England) Donington Park	11 September	(England) Kyle Ryde	(England) Kyle Ryde	(England) Kyle Ryde	R S Racing
11	(England) Silverstone Arena GP	25 September	(England) Kyle Ryde	(England) Wayne Ryan	(England) Kyle Ryde	R S Racing
12	(England) Brands Hatch Indy	9 October	(England) Wayne Ryan	(England) Wayne Ryan	(England) Wayne Ryan	KRP/Racing Steps Foundation

== Championship standings ==
=== Riders' Championship ===
Pos	Rider	Bike	BRH (England)	OUL (England)	CRO (England)	THR (England)	KNO (Scotland)	SNE (England)	OUL (England)	BRH (England)	CAD (England)	DON (England)	SIL (England)	BRH (England)	Pts
1	(England) Kyle Ryde	Honda	Ret	2	2	Ret	1	6		1	1	1	1	3	191
2	(England) Wayne Ryan	Honda	8	Ret	5	3	5	1	2	2	2	4			189
2	(England) Wayne Ryan	Aprilia											2	1	189
3	(England) Rob Guiver	Honda	Ret	1	1	1	16	2	3	3	Ret	3	3	2	179
4	(England) Luke Hedger	Honda	1	Ret	3	10	3	5	9	4	Ret	5	5	4	129
5	(England) Lee Jackson	Honda	13	5	4	8	Ret	4	8	5	4	7	Ret	11	94
6	(England) Bradley Ray	Honda	19	13	11	4	7	20			6	2	6	5	90
6	(England) Bradley Ray	Aztec GP							7	DNS					90
7	(Scotland) Ryan Watson	Seel	2	Ret	13	11	11	3	13	Ret	3	10	13	6	87
8	(England) Joe Irving	Honda	15	8	Ret	5	2	15	6	6	10	Ret	DNS	8	75
9	(South Africa) Jordan Weaving	Honda	Ret	7	7	Ret	8	9	10	7	14	6	8	9	75
10	(England) Philip Wakefield	Seel	6	4	8	DNS					7	8	4	7	70
11	(Australia) Matt Davies	Honda	4	3					1						54
12	(England) Tom Carne	Honda	12	Ret	WD	6	14	10	11	DNS	5	14	7	DNS	49
13	(Scotland) Tarran Mackenzie	Honda	5	Ret	6	13	4	Ret	Ret	Ret		13	12	Ret	44
14	(England) Harry Hartley	Honda	3	6	12	Ret		11	Ret	10	Ret	DNS			41
15	(England) Chrissy Rouse	Honda	Ret	14	Ret	9	6	Ret	Ret	9		12	9		37
16	(Scotland) Callum Bey	Honda	DNS	Ret	24	16	9	8	DNS	8	15	9	19	10	37
17	(England) Nathan Westwood	Honda					17	7	DNS	11	9	15	10	13	31
18	(Northern Ireland) Andrew Reid	Aztec GP	10	Ret	Ret	2	Ret	12							30
19	(Isle of Man) Callan Cooper	Honda	7	Ret		Ret	Ret	17	Ret	12	8	Ret	11	12	30
20	(Northern Ireland) Robert English	Honda	9	Ret	9	DNS	10	Ret	14	13	Ret	11	Ret	16	30
21	(Northern Ireland) Nigel Percy	Honda	Ret	Ret	10	7	Ret	14	Ret	Ret	11	17	Ret	Ret	22
22	(Scotland) Jason Douglas	Honda	20	19	21		12	16	4	Ret	19	18	25	20	17
23	(Isle of Man) Ian Raybon	Honda						13	5	14	18	20	Ret		16
24	(England) Catherine Green	Honda	11	10	18			21	19		13	Ret	18	14	16
25	(England) Jon Vincent	Honda	14	9	17	19	DNS	23	DNS		Ret	Ret	21		9
26	(England) Bradley Hughes	Honda	16	11	Ret	17	Ret	19	18	16	12	16	16	17	9
27	(England) Tommy Philp	Honda	DNS		22	12	Ret	Ret	15	19	17	Ret	22	18	5
28	(England) Richard Ferguson	Honda	18	12	15	Ret	DNS						DNQ		5
29	(Wales) Bryn Owen	Honda							12						4
30	(England) Josh Corner	Honda	17	17	14	Ret		Ret		15	Ret	Ret	Ret	15	4
31	(Scotland) Sammi Tasker	Honda					13			21					3
32	(England) Sam Burman	Honda	DNS	15	Ret	14	18	22	16	18	23	21	Ret	19	3
33	(England) Elliot Lodge	Honda	Ret	Ret	16	Ret		18	20		16	Ret	14	Ret	2
34	(England) Neil Durham	Aprilia	Ret	18	23	18	15	24	Ret		22	19	Ret		1
35	(England) Arnie Shelton	Honda	DNS								20		15		1
36	(England) Jamie Edwards	Aprilia				15		Ret	DNS						1
37	(England) Gary Winfield	Honda		16			19		17			22	23		0
38	(England) Ian Stanford	Honda	21							17				21	0
39	(Wales) Ian Lougher	Honda											17		0
40	(Northern Ireland) Ross Patterson	Honda			19										0
41	(England) Jake Bayford	Aztec GP	Ret	21	27	20	20	26	23	22		25	DNQ		0
42	(England) Kurtis Butler	Honda								20	21		24	DNS	0
43	(England) Matthew Hartley	Honda	DNS	20	25	Ret									0
44	(Malaysia) Farid Badrul	Honda										Ret	20		0
45	(Northern Ireland) Andrew Pollock	Honda			20										0
46	(England) Michael Shuker	Honda	22			DNQ			21			Ret			0
47	(England) Ross Walker	Honda	23	22	26						24	23			0
48	(Wales) Rhodri Owen	Honda							22						0
49	(England) Jamie Mossey	Honda												22	0
50	(England) Andrew Fisher	Honda										Ret		23	0
51	(Northern Ireland) Karl Corbett	Honda								23	DNQ				0
52	(England) Ricky Tarren	Honda										24			0
53	(England) Taryn Taylor	Honda												24	0
54	(England) Paul Dobb	Honda						25				Ret		Ret	0
	(Republic of Ireland) James Flitcroft	KTM			Ret										0
	(Republic of Ireland) James Flitcroft	Honda				Ret									0
	(Wales) Dylan Davies	Honda									Ret		Ret		0
	(England) Ryan Saxelby	Honda							Ret						0
	(Northern Ireland) Adam McLean	Honda											Ret		0
	(Finland) Valter Patronen	Derbi												Ret	0
	(England) Fraser Rogers	Aprilia				WD				DNS					0
	(Northern Ireland) Paul Robinson	Aprilia				DNS									0
	(Scotland) John McPhee	Aprilia								DNS					0
Pos	Rider	Bike	BRH (England)	OUL (England)	CRO (England)	THR (England)	KNO (Scotland)	SNE (England)	OUL (England)	BRH (England)	CAD (England)	DON (England)	SIL (England)	BRH (England)	Pts

Colour	Result
Gold	Winner
Silver	Second place
Bronze	Third place
Green	Points classification
Blue	Non-points classification
Blue	Non-classified finish (NC)
Purple	Retired, not classified (Ret)
Red	Did not qualify (DNQ)
Red	Did not pre-qualify (DNPQ)
Black	Disqualified (DSQ)
White	Did not start (DNS)
White	Withdrew (WD)
White	Race cancelled (C)
Blank	Did not practice (DNP)
Blank	Did not arrive (DNA)
Blank	Excluded (EX)

=== ACU Academy Cup ===
Pos	Rider	Bike	BRH (England)	OUL (England)	CRO (England)	THR (England)	KNO (Scotland)	SNE (England)	OUL (England)	BRH (England)	CAD (England)	DON (England)	SIL (England)	BRH (England)	Pts
1	(England) Kyle Ryde	Honda	Ret	2	2	Ret	1	6		1	1	1	1	3	206
2	(England) Wayne Ryan	Honda	8	Ret	5	3	5	1	2	2	2	4			204
2	(England) Wayne Ryan	Aprilia											2	1	204
3	(England) Luke Hedger	Honda	1	Ret	3	10	3	5	9	4	Ret	5	5	4	154
4	(England) Lee Jackson	Honda	13	5	4	8	Ret	4	8	5	4	7	Ret	11	122
5	(England) Bradley Ray	Honda	19	13	11	4	7	20			6	2	6	5	118
5	(England) Bradley Ray	Aztec GP							7	DNS					118
6	(Scotland) Ryan Watson	Seel	2	Ret	13	11	11	3	13	Ret	3	10	13	6	110
7	(England) Joe Irving	Honda	15	8	Ret	5	2	15	6	6	10	Ret	DNS	8	101
8	(South Africa) Jordan Weaving	Honda	Ret	7	7	Ret	8	9	10	7	10	6	8	9	92
9	(Australia) Matt Davies	Honda	4	3					1						58
10	(Scotland) Callum Bey	Honda	DNS	Ret	24	16	9	8	DNS	8	15	9	19	10	58
11	(Scotland) Tarran Mackenzie	Honda	5	Ret	6	13	4	Ret	Ret	Ret		13	12	Ret	55
12	(England) Chrissy Rouse	Honda	Ret	14	Ret	9	6	Ret	Ret	9		12	9		52
13	(England) Harry Hartley	Honda	3	6	12	Ret		11	Ret	10	Ret	DNS			51
14	(England) Bradley Hughes	Honda	16	11	Ret	17	Ret	19	18	16	12	16	16	17	49
15	(England) Nathan Westwood	Honda					17	7	DNS	11	9	15	10	13	47
16	(Isle of Man) Callan Cooper	Honda	7	Ret		Ret	Ret	17	Ret	12	8	Ret	11	12	43
17	(Scotland) Jason Douglas	Honda	20	19	21		12	16	4	Ret	19	18	25	20	41
18	(England) Tommy Philp	Honda	DNS		22	12	Ret	Ret	15	19	17	Ret	22	18	27
19	(England) Josh Corner	Honda	17	17	14	Ret		Ret		15	Ret	Ret	Ret	15	23
20	(England) Richard Ferguson	Honda	18	12	15	Ret	DNS						DNQ		17
21	(England) Gary Winfield	Honda		16			19		17			22	23		16
22	(England) Jake Bayford	Aztec GP	Ret	21	27	20	20	26	23	22		25	DNQ		11
23	(Scotland) Sammi Tasker	Honda					13			21					4
24	(Northern Ireland) Ross Patterson	Honda			19										4
25	(England) Kurtis Butler	Honda								20	21		24	DNS	4
26	(England) Matthew Hartley	Honda	DNS	20	25	Ret									2
27	(England) Andrew Fisher	Honda										Ret		23	0
28	(Northern Ireland) Karl Corbett	Honda								23	DNQ				0
29	(England) Taryn Taylor	Honda												24	0
	(Republic of Ireland) James Flitcroft	KTM			Ret										0
	(Republic of Ireland) James Flitcroft	Honda				Ret									0
	(Northern Ireland) Adam McLean	Honda											Ret		0
	(Finland) Valter Patronen	Derbi												Ret	0
	(England) Fraser Rogers	Aprilia				WD				DNS					0
	(Scotland) John McPhee	Aprilia								DNS					0
Pos	Rider	Bike	BRH (England)	OUL (England)	CRO (England)	THR (England)	KNO (Scotland)	SNE (England)	OUL (England)	BRH (England)	CAD (England)	DON (England)	SIL (England)	BRH (England)	Pts

Colour	Result
Gold	Winner
Silver	Second place
Bronze	Third place
Green	Points classification
Blue	Non-points classification
Blue	Non-classified finish (NC)
Purple	Retired, not classified (Ret)
Red	Did not qualify (DNQ)
Red	Did not pre-qualify (DNPQ)
Black	Disqualified (DSQ)
White	Did not start (DNS)
White	Withdrew (WD)
White	Race cancelled (C)
Blank	Did not practice (DNP)
Blank	Did not arrive (DNA)
Blank	Excluded (EX)
