= 2012 CEV Moto3 season =

2012 CEV Moto3

Seasons
- ← none 2013 →

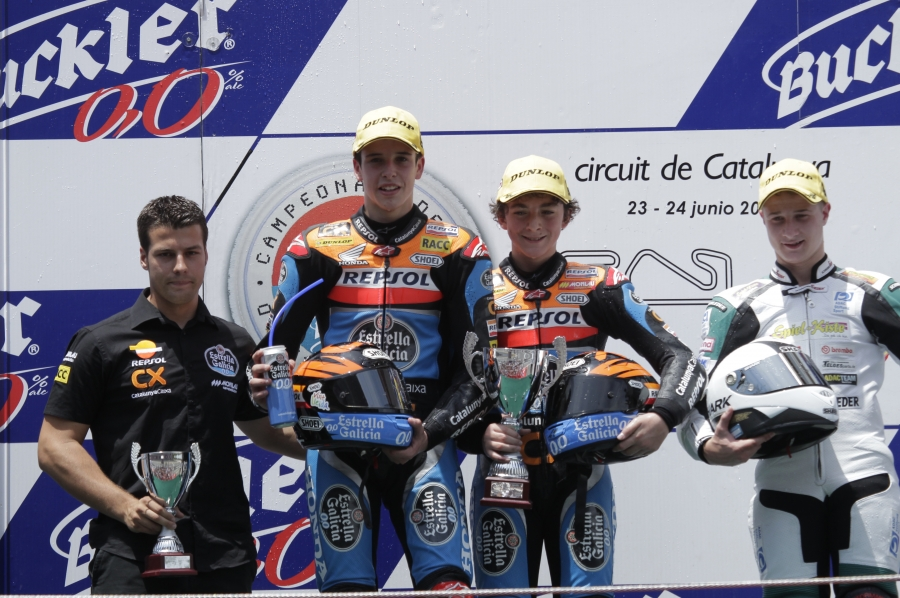
Podium: Álex Márquez, Pecco Bagnaia, Luca Amato.

The 2012 CEV Moto3 season was the inaugural year in which Moto3 bikes became mandatory. Álex Márquez was proclaimed champion after finishing runner up in the 125cc class in 2011.

== Teams and Riders ==
Team	Constructor	No.	Rider	Rounds
(Spain) Motorrad by Fores	Ariane	12	(Spain) Rogelio Lorente	1
(Germany) ADAC Stylobike	FTR Honda	22	(Germany) Luca Amato	All
(Spain) Andalucía Cádiz	FTR Honda	24	(Spain) Marcos Ramírez	All
(Spain) Wild Wolf BST	FTR Honda	28	(Spain) Josep Rodríguez	All
(Spain) Wild Wolf BST	FTR Honda	58	(Spain) Juan Francisco Guevara	All
(Spain) H43 Talasur	GPD-Tecstra	75	(Spain) Enrique Jerez	7
(France) Bianchi Motor Sport	Honda	62	(France) Johan Rousseau	2
(Spain) Bradol Project U 7C HARC Larresport	Honda	9	(Spain) Jorge Navarro	1–6
(Spain) Bradol Project U 7C HARC Larresport	Honda	29	(Japan) Hyuga Watanabe	All
(Spain) Bradol Project U 7C HARC Larresport	Honda	66	(Spain) Eduardo Alayon	7
(Spain) Costa Competicion	Honda	27	(Spain) Alexandre Sirerol	3–7
(Spain) Costa Competicion	Honda	61	(Spain) Montserrat Costa	All
Elle2 Ciatti	Honda	34	(Italy) Federico Fuligni	7
(Germany) EMR	Honda	36	(Germany) Michael Ecklmaier	3
Equipe De France	Honda	60	(France) Renald Castillon	6–7
(Portugal) ERTL Junior Team	Honda	13	(Portugal) Marcel Alves	1–4, 6–7
(Spain) Eurotradis Racing Team/Team Medina	Honda	55	(Spain) Alejandro Medina	All
(United Kingdom) FAB Racing	Honda	82	(United Kingdom) Bradley Ray	7
(Spain) Gadea & PCO Racing	Honda	27	(Spain) Alexandre Sirerol	1–2
(Spain) Gadea & PCO Racing	Honda	66	(Spain) Eduardo Alayon	1
(Spain) / (Japan) H43 Team Nobby Talasur	Honda	18	(Australia) Samuel Rankin	1–4, 6–7
(Spain) / (Japan) H43 Team Nobby Talasur	Honda	46	(Japan) Yui Watanabe	1, 3
(Spain) / (Japan) H43 Team Nobby Talasur	Honda	91	(Japan) Shunya Mori	4
(Spain) / (Japan) H43 Team Nobby Talasur	Honda	96	(Spain) Alejandro Canovas	7
(France) JEG Fury Junior	Honda	95	(France) Jules Danilo	2, 4–7
(Spain) JHK T-shirt Laglisse	Honda	32	(Spain) Ana Carrasco	All
(Spain) JHK T-shirt Laglisse	Honda	36	(Spain) Adrián Martín	7
(Spain) JHK T-shirt Laglisse	Honda	66	(Spain) Eduardo Alayon	3–4
(Monaco) JiR Moto3	Honda	66	(Spain) Eduardo Alayon	2
(Spain) Junior Team Catalunya Caixa Repsol	Honda	6	(Spain) María Herrera	All
(Spain) Junior Team Catalunya Caixa Repsol	Honda	7	(Italy) Lorenzo Baldassarri	All
(Spain) Junior Team Catalunya Caixa Repsol	Honda	41	(Italy) Francesco Bagnaia	All
(France) La Salle des Moteurs	Honda	68	(France) Christophe Rafael	4–7
(Belgium) Marc VDS Racing Team	Honda	57	(Belgium) Livio Loi	6
(Spain) Motorrad Competicion; Motorrad O2-Honda	Honda	11	(Spain) Albert Arenas	All
(Spain) Motorrad Competicion; Motorrad O2-Honda	Honda	16	(Italy) Andrea Migno	1–4
(Spain) Motorrad Competicion; Motorrad O2-Honda	Honda	26	(Spain) Daniel Sáez	All
(Spain) MR Griful Team	Honda	10	(Spain) Agusti Levy	All
(France) PP Promotion	Honda	77	(France) Pierre Ginieys	2, 4, 7
(France) PP Promotion	Honda	84	(Belgium) Amaury Jakab	4–5
(France) PP Promotion	Honda	84	(Belgium) Loris Cresson	6–7
(Spain) RBA	Honda	19	(Argentina) Gabriel Rodrigo	1–6
(Italy) Speed Master Team	Honda	16	(Italy) Andrea Migno	7
(Italy) Speed Master Team	Honda	37	(Spain) Pedro Rodríguez	All
(Spain) Team Machado	Honda	9	(Spain) Jorge Navarro	7
(Spain) Team Machado	Honda	66	(Spain) Eduardo Alayon	6
(Spain) Team RACC Honda	Honda	44	(Argentina) Fausto Grantón	All
(Spain) Team RACC Honda	Honda	97	(Spain) Xavi Vierge	All
(Spain) Team Quinto	Honda	42	(Spain) Aitor Cremades	3–7
Venezuela Racing Team	Honda	4	(Venezuela) Gabriel Ramos	All
Venezuela Racing Team	Honda	71	(Venezuela) Edgar Gallipoli	1–4, 6–7
(Germany) HP Moto Kalex	Kalex KTM	65	(Germany) Philipp Öttl	All
(Belgium) Marc VDS Racing Team	Kalex KTM	57	(Belgium) Livio Loi	7
(Spain) Team Aspar	Kalex KTM	74	(Italy) Kevin Calia	7
(United Kingdom) KRP Racing Steps Foundation	KRP Honda	17	(United Kingdom) John McPhee	All
(United Kingdom) KRP Racing Steps Foundation	KRP Honda	81	(United Kingdom) Ryan Watson	7
(United Kingdom) KRP Racing Steps Foundation	KRP Honda	88	(United Kingdom) Kyle Ryde	7
(United Kingdom) KRP Racing Steps Foundation	KRP Honda	89	(United Kingdom) Fraser Rogers	All
(United Kingdom) KRP Racing Steps Foundation	KRP Honda	98	(United Kingdom) Wayne Ryan	All
(Finland) Red Bull KTM Ajo	KTM	99	(Australia) Arthur Sissis	7
(Spain) MIR Racing	MIR Racing	40	(Spain) Julián Miralles	1–5, 7
(Spain) MIR Racing	MIR Racing	47	(Spain) Ferran Cardús	4
(Spain) MIR Racing	MIR Racing	69	(Andorra) Xavier Cardelús	7
(Australia) Team Gardner Racing	Moriwaki Honda	87	(Australia) Remy Gardner	1–2, 4–7
(Spain) Junior Team Catalunya Caixa Repsol	Suter Honda	23	(Spain) Álex Márquez	All
(Spain) Tey Racing	Suter Honda	15	(South Africa) Brad Binder	7
(Spain) Tey Racing	Suter Honda	48	(Italy) Lorenzo Dalla Porta	7
(France) CIP-TSR	TSR Honda	51	(Japan) Kenta Fujii	7
(France) CIP-TSR	TSR Honda	93	(France) Christophe Arciero	7

== Calendar ==
2012 calendar
Round	Date	Circuit	Pole position	Fastest lap	Race winner	Winning team	Sources
1	1 April	(Spain) Jerez	(Germany) Philipp Öttl	(Germany) Philipp Öttl	(Germany) Philipp Öttl	HP-Moto-Kalex	
2	22 April	(Spain) Navarra	(Spain) Álex Márquez	(Spain) Álex Márquez	(Spain) Álex Márquez	Junior Team Catalunya Caixa Repsol	
3	27 May	(Spain) Aragon	(Spain) Juan Francisco Guevara	(Germany) Luca Amato	(Germany) Luca Amato	ADAC Stylobike	
4	24 June	(Spain) Catalunya	(Italy) Francesco Bagnaia	(Italy) Lorenzo Baldassarri	(Italy) Francesco Bagnaia	Junior Team Catalunya Caixa Repsol	
5	22 July	(Spain) Albacete	(Spain) Álex Márquez	(Germany) Luca Amato	(Spain) Álex Márquez	Junior Team Catalunya Caixa Repsol	
6	9 September	(Spain) Albacete	(Spain) Albert Arenas	(Italy) Francesco Bagnaia	(Spain) Juan Francisco Guevara	Wild Wolf-BST	
7	18 November	(Spain) Valencia	(Italy) Kevin Calia	(Belgium) Livio Loi	(South Africa) Brad Binder	Tey Racing	

== Championship standings ==
Scoring system

Points are awarded to the top fifteen finishers. A rider has to finish the race to earn points.

Position	**1st**	**2nd**	**3rd**	**4th**	**5th**	**6th**	**7th**	**8th**	**9th**	**10th**	**11th**	**12th**	**13th**	**14th**	**15th**
Points	25	20	16	13	11	10	9	8	7	6	5	4	3	2	1

Pos	Rider	Bike	JER (Spain)	NAV (Spain)	ARA (Spain)	CAT (Spain)	ALB (Spain)	ALB (Spain)	VAL (Spain)	Pts
1	(Spain) Álex Márquez	Suter Honda	Ret	**1**	2	2	**1**	4		103
2	(Germany) Luca Amato	FTR Honda	Ret	4	1	3	2	Ret	12	78
3	(Italy) Francesco Bagnaia	Honda	8	2	Ret	**1**	Ret	2	Ret	73
4	(Germany) Philipp Öttl	Kalex KTM	**1**	8	7	8	9	Ret	4	70
5	(Spain) Marcos Ramírez	FTR Honda	6	5	4	5	4	Ret	11	63
6	(Spain) Juan Francisco Guevara	FTR Honda	5	Ret	**3**	6	Ret	1	Ret	62
7	(United Kingdom) John McPhee	KRP Honda	3	3	9	Ret	6	5	Ret	60
8	(Italy) Lorenzo Baldassarri	Honda	Ret	7	11	4	Ret	8	7	44
9	(Spain) Josep Rodríguez	FTR Honda	4	Ret	6	14	Ret	11	5	41
10	(Japan) Hyuga Watanabe	Honda	Ret	9	10	7	3	Ret	Ret	38
11	(Spain) Julián Miralles	Honda	13	14	5	18	7		6	37
12	(Spain) Jorge Navarro	Honda	11	Ret	8	10	Ret	7	8	36
13	(Spain) Alejandro Medina	Honda	2	Ret	27	13	8	Ret	14	33
14	(United Kingdom) Fraser Rogers	KRP Honda	24	6	14	11	10	6	Ret	33
15	(Spain) Xavi Vierge	Honda	Ret	10	13	12	5	9	Ret	31
16	(Spain) Albert Arenas	Honda	Ret	Ret	12	9	Ret	**3**	Ret	27
17	(South Africa) Brad Binder	Suter Honda							**1**	25
18	(Belgium) Livio Loi	Honda						13		23
18	(Belgium) Livio Loi	Kalex KTM							2	23
19	(Spain) Ana Carrasco	Honda	7	Ret	16	17	11	10	Ret	20
20	(Italy) Kevin Calia	Kalex KTM							3	16
21	(France) Jules Danilo	Honda		14		16	14	12	10	14
22	(Italy) Andrea Migno	Honda	10	13	19	Ret			13	12
23	(United Kingdom) Wayne Ryan	KRP Honda	16	11	15	15	12	Ret	Ret	11
24	(Spain) Eduardo Alayon	Honda	9	21	Ret	33		18	18	7
25	(United Kingdom) Kyle Ryde	Honda							9	7
26	(Australia) Remy Gardner	Moriwaki Honda	Ret	15		Ret	13	14	19	6
27	(Argentina) Fausto Granton	Honda	12	Ret	22	22	16	Ret	Ret	4
28	(Spain) Daniel Sáez	Honda	14	18	18	27	Ret	26	22	2
29	(Spain) Pedro Rodríguez	Honda	15	16	17	23	17	16	20	1
30	(Spain) María Herrera	Honda	23	WD	Ret	29	19	15	16	1
31	(Venezuela) Gabriel Ramos	Honda	Ret	17	20	24	15	Ret	25	1
32	(United Kingdom) Bradley Ray	Honda							15	1
	(Argentina) Gabriel Rodrigo	Honda	DNS	WD	Ret	21	Ret	17		0
	(Portugal) Marcel Alves	Honda	17	22	Ret	30		Ret	23	0
	(Australia) Samuel Rankin	Honda	18	Ret	21	25		25	DNQ	0
	(Spain) Aitor Cremades	Honda			26	26	18	23	DNQ	0
	(Spain) Agusti Levy	Honda	Ret	19	24	28	Ret	20	Ret	0
	(Spain) Alexandre Sirerol	Honda	19	Ret	25	Ret	Ret	Ret	21	0
	(France) Renald Castillon	Honda						19	26	0
	(Spain) Ferran Cardús	MIR Racing				19				0
	(Japan) Shunya Mori	Honda				20				0
	(Venezuela) Edgar Gallipoli	Honda	20	Ret	23	32		Ret	DNQ	0
	(France) Pierre Ginieys	Honda		20		31			DNQ	0
	(Spain) Montserrat Costa	Honda	22	23	Ret	Ret	21	24	DNQ	0
	(Spain) Rogelio Lorente	Ariane	21							0
	(Belgium) Amaury Jakab	Honda				Ret	22			0
	(Belgium) Loris Cresson	Honda						22	DNQ	0
	(Japan) Kenta Fujii	TSR Honda							24	0
	(Italy) Federico Fuligni	Honda							27	0
	(United Kingdom) Ryan Watson	KRP Honda							28	0
	(Japan) Yui Watanabe	Honda	Ret		Ret					0
	(Germany) Michael Ecklmaier	Honda			Ret					0
	(Spain) Adrián Martín	Honda							Ret	0
	(Australia) Arthur Sissis	KTM							Ret	0
	(Australia) Christophe Arciero	TSR Honda							Ret	0
	(Spain) Enrique Jerez	GPD-Tecstra							Ret	0
	(Italy) Lorenzo Dalla Porta	Suter Honda							Ret	0
	(Spain) Alejandro Canovas	Honda							DNQ	
	(Andorra) Xavier Cardelús	MIR Racing							DNQ	
	(France) Johan Rousseau	Honda		WD						
Pos	Rider	Bike	JER (Spain)	NAV (Spain)	ARA (Spain)	CAT (Spain)	ALB (Spain)	ALB (Spain)	VAL (Spain)	Pts

Colour	Result
Gold	Winner
Silver	Second place
Bronze	Third place
Green	Points classification
Blue	Non-points classification
Blue	Non-classified finish (NC)
Purple	Retired, not classified (Ret)
Red	Did not qualify (DNQ)
Red	Did not pre-qualify (DNPQ)
Black	Disqualified (DSQ)
White	Did not start (DNS)
White	Withdrew (WD)
White	Race cancelled (C)
Blank	Did not practice (DNP)
Blank	Did not arrive (DNA)
Blank	Excluded (EX)

**Bold** – Pole position
Italics – Fastest lap
