= McPhee =

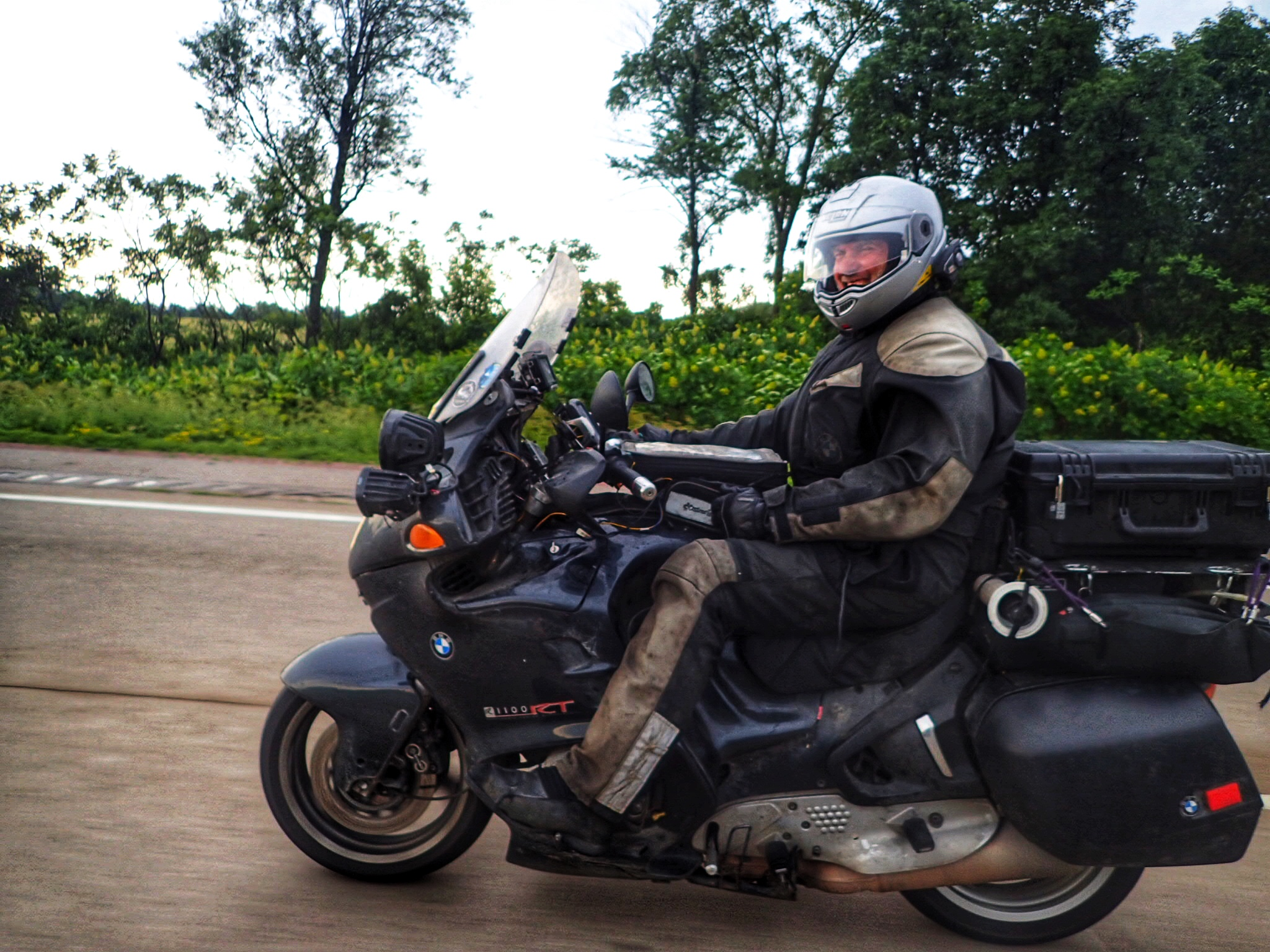
Ian McPhee during his Iron Butt rally, 2019

McPhee, McPhie, MacPhee or Macphee is a Scottish surname. Like MacFie, it is usually regarded as a shorter version of McDuffie, which is an anglicisation of the Scottish Gaelic name mac Dhuibhshithe ("descendant of the dark fairy") and originated in Colonsay. However, it may instead be derived from another Gaelic name, mac a' Phì; hence it may have the same origins as surnames such as Fee, MacFee, McFee, Macfee, MacAfee and Mahaffey.

== People ==
McPhee

- Adam McPhee (born 1982), Australian rules football player
- Angus McPhee (1916–1997), Scottish outsider artist from the island of South Uist
- Archie McPhee, Seattle-based novelty dealer owned by Mark Pahlow
- Bid McPhee (1859–1943), American Major League Baseball second baseman
- Brian McPhee (born 1970), Scottish footballer
- Bruce McPhee (1927–2009), former Australian motor racing driver
- Catherine-Ann MacPhee (born 1959), Gaelic singer
- Charles McPhee (1962–2011), researcher, author, nationally syndicated talk radio host
- Chris McPhee (born 1983), English footballer
- Christina McPhee (born 1954), American painter, new media and video artist
- Colin McPhee (1900–1964), Canadian composer and musicologist
- Frank McPhee, long-time Glasgow gangland boss
- Frank McPhee (American football) (1931–2011), American football player
- George McPhee (born 1958), the general manager of the National Hockey League's Vegas Golden Knights
- George Washington McPhee (1880–1971), lawyer, judge, political figure in Prince Edward Island and Saskatchewan
- Gloria McPhee (1926 – 2007), Bermudian politician
- Hilary McPhee (1941–2026), Australian publisher, editor and businessperson
- Ian McPhee (footballer) (born 1961), Scottish former professional footballer
- Joe McPhee (born 1939), American jazz multi-instrumentalist
- John McPhee (born 1931), American writer, pioneer of creative nonfiction
- John McPhee (footballer) (born 1937), Scottish former professional footballer
- John McPhee (motorcyclist) (born 1994), Scottish Grand Prix motorcycle racer
- John McPhee (politician), KCMG (1878–1952), Australian politician, member of the Tasmanian House of Assembly
- Katharine McPhee (born 1984), American pop singer, songwriter and actress
- Kodi Smit-McPhee (born 1996), Australian actor
- Laura McPhee (born 1958), Boston-based American photographer
- Lawrence McPhee (1899–1983), American football player and coach
- Mark McPhee (born 1964), Australian cricketer
- Martha McPhee, American novelist
- Michele McPhee (born 1970), American author, talk radio host, and journalist
- Mike McPhee (born 1960), retired Canadian ice hockey forward
- Pernell McPhee (born 1988), American football defensive end
- Peter McPhee (cricketer) (born 1963), Australian cricketer
- Peter McPhee (footballer) (born 1934), Australian rules footballer
- Peter McPhee (academic), Australian academic, formerly Provost of the University of Melbourne
- Scott McPhee (born 1992), Australian cyclist, who pilots Kieran Modra in tandem cycling
- Sianoa Smit-McPhee (born 1992), Australian actress
- Sidney A. McPhee, American educator, currently President of Middle Tennessee State University
- Simon McPhee (born 1969), Australian rules football coach
- Stephanie Pearl-McPhee (born 1968), Canadian writer, knitter, IBCLC and doula
- Stephen McPhee (born 1981), Scottish former footballer
- Tony McPhee (born 1944), English blues guitarist, and founder of The Groundhogs
- Tony McPhee (footballer) (1914–1960), Scottish footballer and football manager

MacPhee

- Catherine-Ann MacPhee (born 1959), Scottish Gaelic singer
- Ian Macphee (born 1938), Australian former politician, member of the House of Representatives from 1974 to 1990
- Josh MacPhee, artist, curator and activist living in Brooklyn, New York
- Niall MacPhee (born 1985), shinty player from Fort William, Scotland
- Rebecca Jean MacPhee (born 1974), Canadian curler
- Robyn MacPhee (born 1983), Canadian curler
- Waddy MacPhee (1899–1980), former professional baseball player and American football player

== In fiction ==
- Andrew MacPhee, a rationalist sceptic in That Hideous Strength by C. S. Lewis
- Characters in Dawson's Creek:
  - Andie McPhee, portrayed by Meredith Monroe
  - Jack McPhee, portrayed by Kerr Smith
- Nanny McPhee, in the 2005 film and Nanny McPhee and the Big Bang, a 2010 sequel.
- Floss McPhee, in the Australian soap opera Home and Away played by Sheila Kennelly

== Other ==
- McPhee Reservoir, in Montezuma County, Colorado.
- McPhee Gribble, Australian publisher.
- McPhee station, a railroad station on the Soo Line in Michigan, USA.

== See also ==
- Clan Macfie - Scottish clan, of which McPhee is considered an associated name
- MacPherson
