= Luke Hedger =

British motorcycle racer

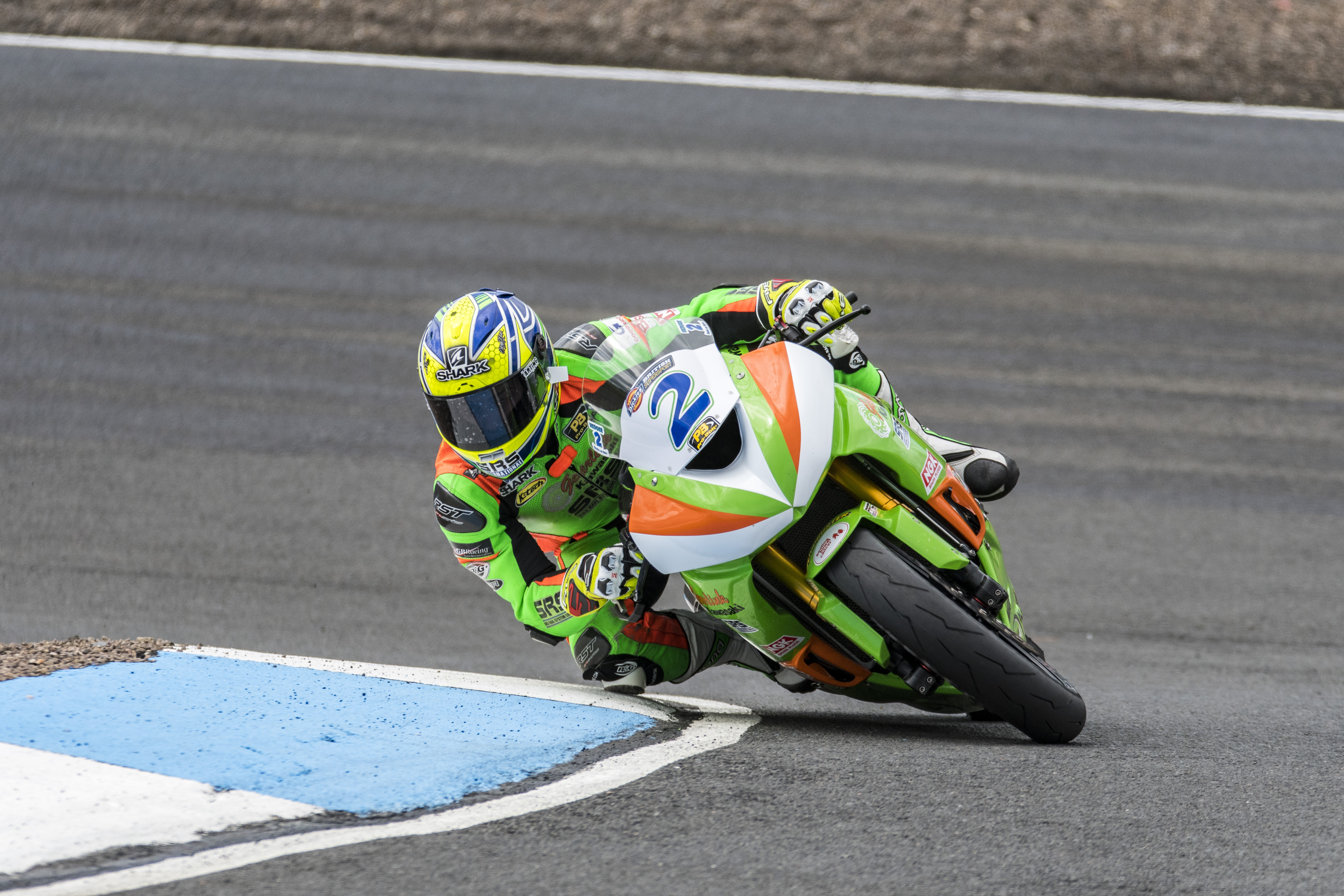
- Hedger in 2016
- Nationality: British
- Born: 6 December 1995 (age 30); Yate, Bristol, England, United Kingdom
- Current team: Whitecliffe CDH Honda
- Bike number: 12
- Website: https://lukehedgerracing.com/
Motorcycle racing career statistics
Moto3 World Championship
Active years	2015
Manufacturers	Kalex KTM
Championships	0
2015 championship position	NC (0 pts)
Starts / Wins / Podiums / Poles / F. laps / Points; 1 / 0 / 0 / 0 / 0 / 0
British Superbike Championship
Active years	2025–
Manufacturers	Honda
Championships	0
2025 championship position	20th (11 pts)
Starts / Wins / Podiums / Poles / F. laps / Points; 14 / 0 / 0 / 0 / 0 / 11

Luke Hedger (born 6 December 1995 in Yate, Bristol) is a British motorcycle racer. He was the British Motostar champion in 2012 and the National Superstock 600 champion in 2013. He last competed in the 2025 British Superbike Championship for Whitecliffe CDH Racing Honda.

== Career statistics ==
=== British 125 Championship ===
Year	Bike	1	2	3	4	5	6	7	8	9	10	11	12	Pos	Pts
2011	Honda	BRH; 1	OUL; Ret	CRO; 3	THR; 10	KNO; 3	SNE; 5	OUL; 9	BRH; 4	CAD; Ret	DON; 5	SIL; 5	BRH; 4	**4th**	**129**

=== Grand Prix motorcycle racing ===
==== By season ====
Season	Class	Motorcycle	Team	Race	Win	Podium	Pole	FLap	Pts	Plcd
2015	Moto3	Kalex KTM	FPW Racing	1	0	0	0	0	0	NC
Total				**1**	**0**	**0**	**0**	**0**	**0**	

==== Races by year ====
Yr	Class	Bike	1	2	3	4	5	6	7	8	9	10	11	12	13	14	15	16	17	18	Pos.	Pts
2015	Moto3	Kalex KTM	QAT	AME	ARG	SPA	FRA	ITA	CAT	NED	GER	INP	CZE	GBR; 18	RSM	ARA	JPN	AUS	MAL	VAL	NC	0

=== British Superbike Championship ===
(key) (Races in bold indicate pole position; races in italics indicate fastest lap)

Year	Make	1		2		3			4		5		6			7		8			9			10		11		12			Pos	Pts
Year	Make	R1	R2	R1	R2	R1	R2	R3	R1	R2	R1	R2	R1	R2	R3	R1	R2	R1	R2	R3	R1	R2	R3	R1	R2	R1	R2	R1	R2	R3	Pos	Pts
2018	BMW	DON	DON	BHI	BHI	OUL	OUL		SNE	SNE	KNO; DNS	KNO; DNS	BHGP; 18	BHGP; 22		THR; 18	THR; 19	CAD	CAD		SIL; 21	SIL; Ret	SIL; Ret	OUL	OUL	ASS	ASS	BHGP	BHGP	BHGP	NC	0

Year	Bike	1			2			3			4			5			6			7			8			9			10			11			Pos	Pts
Year	Bike	R1	R2	R3	R1	R2	R3	R1	R2	R3	R1	R2	R3	R1	R2	R3	R1	R2	R3	R1	R2	R3	R1	R2	R3	R1	R2	R3	R1	R2	R3	R1	R2	R3	Pos	Pts
2024	Kawasaki	NAV; 22	NAV; 20		OUL; 18	OUL; Ret	OUL; DNS	DON; 21	DON; 19	DON; 18	KNO; 14	KNO; 15	KNO; 12	SNE; Ret	SNE; 20	SNE; 19>	BRH; 13	BRH; DNS	BRH; WD	THR; 19	THR; 19	THR; 19	CAD; Ret	CAD; 20	CAD; 20	OUL; Ret	OUL; 19	OUL; 15	DON; Ret	DON; 18	DON; Ret	BRH; 14	BRH; Ret	BRH; Ret	22nd	15
2025	Honda	OUL; 18	OUL; Ret	OUL; C	DON; 15	DON; 16	DON; 17	SNE; Ret	SNE; 15	SNE; 17	KNO; 16	KNO; 14	KNO; 15	BRH; 15	BRH; 13	BRH; 15	THR	THR	THR	CAD	CAD	CAD	DON	DON	DON	ASS	ASS	ASS	OUL	OUL	OUL	BRH	BRH	BRH	20th*	11*

^{*} Season still in progress.

=== British Supersport Championship ===
(key) (Races in bold indicate pole position; races in italics indicate fastest lap)

Year	Bike	1	2	3	4	5	6	7	8	9	10	11	12	13	14	15	16	17	18	19	20	21	22	23	24	Pos	Pts
2015	Kawasaki	DON	DON	BRH	BRH	OUL; 6	OUL; Ret	SNE; 6	SNE; 3	KNO; 6	KNO; 8	BRH; 6	BRH; 7	THR; 7	THR; 5	CAD; 8	CAD; 6	OUL; 8	OUL; 6	ASS; Ret	ASS; 9	SIL; 9	SIL; 6	BRH; 9	BRH; 8	8th	168
