= 2013 British motorcycle Grand Prix =

(United Kingdom) 2013 British Grand Prix
Race details
- Race 12 of 18 races in the 2013 Grand Prix motorcycle racing season
- Date: 1 September 2013
- Official name: Hertz British Grand Prix
- Location: Silverstone Circuit
- Course: Permanent racing facility; 5.900 km (3.666 mi)

MotoGP
Pole position
Rider	(Spain) Marc Márquez	Honda
Time	2:00.691	
Fastest lap
Rider	(Spain) Dani Pedrosa	Honda
Time	2:01.941 on lap 6	
Podium
First	(Spain) Jorge Lorenzo	Yamaha
Second	(Spain) Marc Márquez	Honda
Third	(Spain) Dani Pedrosa	Honda

Moto2
Pole position
Rider	(Japan) Takaaki Nakagami	Kalex
Time	2:07.039	
Fastest lap
Rider	(Spain) Esteve Rabat	Kalex
Time	2:07.186 on lap 16	
Podium
First	(United Kingdom) Scott Redding	Kalex
Second	(Japan) Takaaki Nakagami	Kalex
Third	(Switzerland) Thomas Lüthi	Suter

Moto3
Pole position
Rider	(Spain) Maverick Viñales	KTM
Time	2:13.507	
Fastest lap
Rider	(Spain) Álex Rins	KTM
Time	2:14.093 on lap 8	
Podium
First	(Spain) Luis Salom	KTM
Second	(Spain) Álex Rins	KTM
Third	(Spain) Álex Márquez	KTM

The 2013 British motorcycle Grand Prix was the twelfth round of the 2013 MotoGP season. It was held at the Silverstone Circuit in Silverstone on 1 September 2013.

After two years of using the new International Paddock built for the 2011 Formula One round, the MotoGP teams worked from the National Circuit pits for the first time since 2010, with the finish line located at its traditional point, the exit of Woodcote.

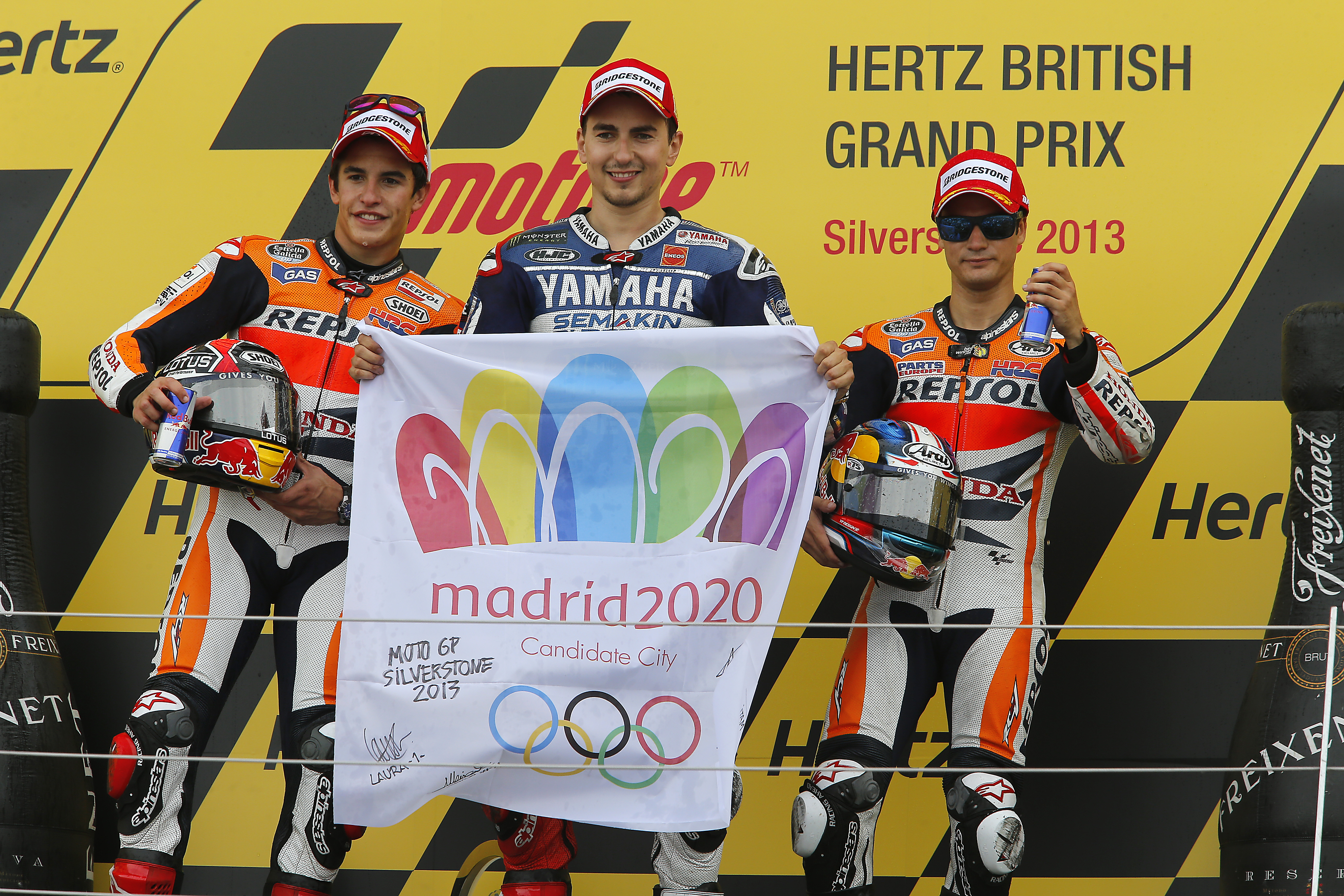
Marc Márquez, Jorge Lorenzo and Dani Pedrosa, celebrating on the podium after finishing second, first and third in the MotoGP race. They are holding a banner that endorses the candidacy of Madrid to host the 2020 Summer Olympics.

== Classification ==
=== MotoGP ===
Pos.	No.	Rider	Team	Manufacturer	Laps	Time/Retired	Grid	Points
1	99	(Spain) Jorge Lorenzo	Yamaha Factory Racing	Yamaha	20	40:52.515	2	25
2	93	(Spain) Marc Márquez	Repsol Honda Team	Honda	20	+0.081	1	20
3	26	(Spain) Dani Pedrosa	Repsol Honda Team	Honda	20	+1.551	5	16
4	46	(Italy) Valentino Rossi	Yamaha Factory Racing	Yamaha	20	+13.233	6	13
5	19	(Spain) Álvaro Bautista	Go&Fun Honda Gresini	Honda	20	+13.298	2	11
6	6	(Germany) Stefan Bradl	LCR Honda MotoGP	Honda	20	+20.227	4	10
7	35	(United Kingdom) Cal Crutchlow	Monster Yamaha Tech 3	Yamaha	20	+26.299	3	9
8	69	(United States) Nicky Hayden	Ducati Team	Ducati	20	+35.993	9	8
9	38	(United Kingdom) Bradley Smith	Monster Yamaha Tech 3	Yamaha	20	+36.119	10	7
10	41	(Spain) Aleix Espargaró	Power Electronics Aspar	ART	20	+53.196	12	6
11	29	(Italy) Andrea Iannone	Energy T.I. Pramac Racing	Ducati	20	+59.058	16	5
12	51	(Italy) Michele Pirro	Ignite Pramac Racing	Ducati	20	+1:00.710	15	4
13	8	(Spain) Héctor Barberá	Avintia Blusens	FTR	20	+1:01.690	14	3
14	5	(United States) Colin Edwards	NGM Mobile Forward Racing	FTR Kawasaki	20	+1:01.843	11	2
15	9	(Italy) Danilo Petrucci	Came IodaRacing Project	Ioda-Suter	20	+1:08.833	18	1
16	14	(France) Randy de Puniet	Power Electronics Aspar	ART	20	+1:09.063	13	
17	71	(Italy) Claudio Corti	NGM Mobile Forward Racing	FTR Kawasaki	20	+1:16.474	20	
18	7	(Japan) Hiroshi Aoyama	Avintia Blusens	FTR	20	+1:16.535	21	
19	70	(United Kingdom) Michael Laverty	Paul Bird Motorsport	PBM	20	+1:32.057	19	
20	68	(Colombia) Yonny Hernández	Paul Bird Motorsport	ART	20	+1:36.224	17	
21	67	(Australia) Bryan Staring	Go&Fun Honda Gresini	FTR Honda	20	+2:00.635	23	
Ret	4	(Italy) Andrea Dovizioso	Ducati Team	Ducati	18	Accident	7	
Ret	52	(Czech Republic) Lukáš Pešek	Came IodaRacing Project	Ioda-Suter	1	Accident	22	

=== Moto2 ===
Pos.	No.	Rider	Manufacturer	Laps	Time/Retired	Grid	Points
1	45	(United Kingdom) Scott Redding	Kalex	18	38:22.897	2	25
2	30	(Japan) Takaaki Nakagami	Kalex	18	+1.066	1	20
3	12	(Switzerland) Thomas Lüthi	Suter	18	+1.170	5	16
4	80	(Spain) Esteve Rabat	Kalex	18	+1.427	4	13
5	77	(Switzerland) Dominique Aegerter	Suter	18	+2.226	8	11
6	36	(Finland) Mika Kallio	Kalex	18	+8.142	7	10
7	5	(France) Johann Zarco	Suter	18	+12.146	3	9
8	40	(Spain) Pol Espargaró	Kalex	18	+13.228	6	8
9	3	(Italy) Simone Corsi	Speed Up	18	+15.162	22	7
10	54	(Italy) Mattia Pasini	Speed Up	18	+15.225	12	6
11	18	(Spain) Nicolás Terol	Suter	18	+20.734	11	5
12	60	(Spain) Julián Simón	Kalex	18	+22.353	15	4
13	81	(Spain) Jordi Torres	Suter	18	+25.657	10	3
14	15	(San Marino) Alex de Angelis	Speed Up	18	+25.994	16	2
15	24	(Spain) Toni Elías	Kalex	18	+28.900	14	1
16	23	(Germany) Marcel Schrötter	Kalex	18	+32.012	17	
17	88	(Spain) Ricard Cardús	Speed Up	18	+32.730	18	
18	52	(United Kingdom) Danny Kent	Tech 3	18	+32.800	26	
19	4	(Switzerland) Randy Krummenacher	Suter	18	+40.942	13	
20	11	(Germany) Sandro Cortese	Kalex	18	+50.507	23	
21	49	(Spain) Axel Pons	Kalex	18	+50.623	28	
22	72	(Japan) Yuki Takahashi	Moriwaki	18	+51.003	25	
23	96	(France) Louis Rossi	Tech 3	18	+51.526	21	
24	22	(Australia) Jason O'Halloran	Motobi	18	+51.856	24	
25	7	(Indonesia) Doni Tata Pradita	Suter	18	+1:24.159	31	
26	10	(Thailand) Thitipong Warokorn	Suter	18	+1:25.074	30	
27	97	(Indonesia) Rafid Topan Sucipto	Speed Up	17	+1 lap	29	
DSQ	95	(Australia) Anthony West	Speed Up	18	(+50.214)	27	
Ret	19	(Belgium) Xavier Siméon	Kalex	17	Accident	9	
Ret	8	(United Kingdom) Gino Rea	FTR	16	Accident	20	
Ret	17	(Spain) Alberto Moncayo	Speed Up	3	Accident	19	
DNS	27	(Spain) Dani Rivas	Kalex		Injured		
DNS	44	(South Africa) Steven Odendaal	Speed Up		Injured		
OFFICIAL MOTO2 REPORT

=== Moto3 ===
Pos.	No.	Rider	Manufacturer	Laps	Time/Retired	Grid	Points
1	39	(Spain) Luis Salom	KTM	17	38:17.291	3	25
2	42	(Spain) Álex Rins	KTM	17	+0.049	2	20
3	12	(Spain) Álex Márquez	KTM	17	+0.698	6	16
4	25	(Spain) Maverick Viñales	KTM	17	+0.849	1	13
5	44	(Portugal) Miguel Oliveira	Mahindra	17	+20.561	8	11
6	94	(Germany) Jonas Folger	Kalex KTM	17	+20.625	5	10
7	8	(Australia) Jack Miller	FTR Honda	17	+20.631	4	9
8	10	(France) Alexis Masbou	FTR Honda	17	+20.882	10	8
9	84	(Czech Republic) Jakub Kornfeil	Kalex KTM	17	+24.970	17	7
10	7	(Spain) Efrén Vázquez	Mahindra	17	+25.288	13	6
11	32	(Spain) Isaac Viñales	FTR Honda	17	+25.601	7	5
12	5	(Italy) Romano Fenati	FTR Honda	17	+25.684	12	4
13	23	(Italy) Niccolò Antonelli	FTR Honda	17	+26.612	9	3
14	17	(United Kingdom) John McPhee	FTR Honda	17	+28.602	19	2
15	31	(Finland) Niklas Ajo	KTM	17	+34.145	11	1
16	65	(Germany) Philipp Öttl	Kalex KTM	17	+34.187	16	
17	3	(Italy) Matteo Ferrari	FTR Honda	17	+34.824	22	
18	77	(Italy) Lorenzo Baldassarri	FTR Honda	17	+42.427	23	
19	11	(Belgium) Livio Loi	Kalex KTM	17	+48.640	32	
20	63	(Malaysia) Zulfahmi Khairuddin	KTM	17	+48.952	20	
21	9	(Germany) Toni Finsterbusch	Kalex KTM	17	+48.964	26	
22	22	(Spain) Ana Carrasco	KTM	17	+48.993	30	
23	29	(Japan) Hyuga Watanabe	FTR Honda	17	+49.528	25	
24	61	(Australia) Arthur Sissis	KTM	17	+49.853	18	
25	66	(Germany) Florian Alt	Kalex KTM	17	+57.510	29	
26	21	(Germany) Luca Amato	Suter Honda	17	+1:19.491	31	
27	37	(United Kingdom) Kyle Ryde	KRP Honda	17	+1:21.415	35	
28	53	(Netherlands) Jasper Iwema	Kalex KTM	17	+1:21.469	34	
29	57	(Brazil) Eric Granado	Kalex KTM	17	+1:57.071	24	
30	98	(United Kingdom) Wayne Ryan	KRP Honda	16	+1 lap	33	
Ret	41	(South Africa) Brad Binder	Suter Honda	15	Retirement	14	
Ret	19	(Italy) Alessandro Tonucci	FTR Honda	14	Accident	15	
Ret	4	(Italy) Francesco Bagnaia	FTR Honda	2	Retirement	21	
Ret	58	(Spain) Juan Francisco Guevara	TSR Honda	0	Collision	27	
Ret	89	(France) Alan Techer	TSR Honda	0	Collision	28	
OFFICIAL MOTO3 REPORT

== Championship standings after the race (MotoGP) ==
Below are the standings for the top five riders and constructors after round twelve has concluded.

Riders' Championship standings

Pos.	Rider	Points
1	(Spain) Marc Márquez	233
2	(Spain) Dani Pedrosa	203
3	(Spain) Jorge Lorenzo	194
4	(Italy) Valentino Rossi	156
5	(United Kingdom) Cal Crutchlow	136

Constructors' Championship standings

Pos.	Constructor	Points
1	(Japan) Honda	271
2	(Japan) Yamaha	245
3	(Italy) Ducati	107
4	(Italy) ART	70
5	(United Kingdom) FTR	31

- Note: Only the top five positions are included for both sets of standings.

Previous race: 2013 Czech Republic Grand Prix	FIM Grand Prix World Championship; 2013 season	Next race: 2013 San Marino Grand Prix
Previous race: 2012 British Grand Prix	British motorcycle Grand Prix	Next race: 2014 British Grand Prix
