= Wayne Ryan =

British motorcycle racer

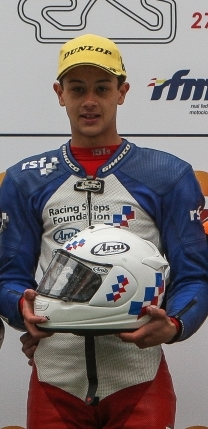
- Ryan in 2013
- Nationality: British
- Born: 5 May 1996 (age 30); Camden, United Kingdom
Motorcycle racing career statistics
Moto3 World Championship
Active years	2013
Manufacturers	KRP Honda
Championships	0
2013 championship position	NC (0 pts)
Starts / Wins / Podiums / Poles / F. laps / Points; 1 / 0 / 0 / 0 / 0 / 0

Wayne Ryan (born 5 May 1996 in Camden) is a British Grand Prix motorcycle racer.

== Career statistics ==
2007- 2nd, British 50GP Conti Cup #12 Conti
2008- 5th, British Aprilia Superteens #12 Aprilia
2009- 1st, British Aprilia Superteens #12 Aprilia
2010- 13th, British 125cc Championship #98 Honda RS125R
2011- 2nd, British 125cc Championship #98 Honda RS125R
2012- 23rd, CEV Moto3 Championship #98 KRP Honda
2013- 9th, CEV Moto3 Championship #98 KRP Honda
2014- 26th, FIM CEV Moto3 Championship #69 KTM RC250GP
2015- 17th, National Superstock 600 Championship #98 Kawasaki ZX-6R

=== British 125 Championship ===
Year	Bike	1	2	3	4	5	6	7	8	9	10	11	12	13	Pos	Pts
2010	Honda	BRH; 7	THR; Ret	OUL; 6	CAD; Ret	MAL; 14	KNO; C	SNE; 4	BRH; 12	CAD; 15	CRO; 19	CRO; 16	SIL; Ret	OUL; 6	**13th**	**49**
2011	Honda/Aprilia	BRH; 8	OUL; Ret	CRO; 3	**THR**; 5	KNO; 1	SNE; 2	OUL; 2	BRH; 2	CAD; 2	DON; 4	SIL; 2	**BRH**; 1		**2nd**	**189**

=== FIM CEV Moto3 Championship ===
==== Races by year ====
(key) (Races in bold indicate pole position; races in italics indicate fastest lap)

Year	Bike	1	2	3	4	5	6	7	8	9	Pos	Pts
2012	KRP Honda	JER; 16	NAV; 11	ARA; 15	CAT; 15	ALB1; 12	ALB2; Ret	VAL; Ret			23rd	11
2013	KRP Honda	CAT1; 1	CAT2; Ret	ARA; 9	ALB1; 7	ALB2; Ret	NAV; Ret	VAL1; Ret	VAL1; Ret	JER; 12	9th	45

=== FIM CEV Moto3 Junior World Championship ===
==== Races by year ====
(key) (Races in bold indicate pole position; races in italics indicate fastest lap)

Year	Bike	1	2	3	4	5	6	7	8	9	10	11	Pos	Pts
2014	KTM	JER1; Ret	JER2; DNS	LMS	ARA; 14	CAT1; 22	CAT2; 21	ALB; 17	NAV; 10	ALG; Ret	VAL1; 19	VAL2; 15	26th	9

=== Grand Prix motorcycle racing ===
==== By season ====
Season	Class	Motorcycle	Team	Number	Race	Win	Podium	Pole	FLap	Pts	Plcd
2013	Moto3	KRP Honda	Racing Steps Foundation KRP	98	1	0	0	0	0	0	NC
Total					**1**	**0**	**0**	**0**	**0**	**0**	

==== Races by year ====
(key)

Year	Class	Bike	1	2	3	4	5	6	7	8	9	10	11	12	13	14	15	16	17	Pos	Pts
2013	Moto3	KRP Honda	QAT	AME	SPA	FRA	ITA	CAT	NED	GER	INP	CZE	GBR; 30	RSM	ARA	MAL	AUS	JPN	VAL	NC	0
