= McDuffie =

McDuffie or MacDuffie is a surname of Scottish and Irish origin. McDuffie/MacDuffie is an Anglicization of the Gaelic Mac Duibhshíthe ("son of Duibhshíth"). The Gaelic name is composed of two elements; dubh ("black") + síth ("peace"). The name is sometimes shortened to McPhee or McFee. Notable people with the surname include:

- Amy Roth McDuffie, American scholar of mathematics education
- Arthur McDuffie (1946–1979), American citizen
- Chris McDuffie, American musician
- Duncan McDuffie (1877–1951), American architect
- Dwayne McDuffie (1962–2011), American animator
- George McDuffie (1790–1851), American politician
- George McDuffie (American football) (born 1963), American football player
- Isaiah McDuffie (born 1999), American football player
- J. D. McDuffie (1938–1991), American racing driver
- James McDuffie (1929–2015), American politician
- John McDuffie (1883–1950), American politician
- John Van McDuffie (1841–1896), American politician
- Kenyan McDuffie, American politician
- Markis McDuffie (born 1997), American basketball player
- O. J. McDuffie (born 1969), American football player
- Robert McDuffie, American violinist
- Trent McDuffie (born 2000), American football player

== See also ==
- McDuffie County, Georgia – A county located in the U.S. state of Georgia
- Tydings–McDuffie Act – Officially the Philippine Independence Act; Public Law 73-127
- MacDuffie School – A private school for grades 6-12 located in Granby, Massachusetts, United States
- Clan Macfie – A Scottish clan, whose ancestral lands were on the island of Colonsay, Inner Hebrides, Scotland
- Mount McDuffie – A mountain in the Sierra Nevada, California
