= Amy Roth McDuffie =

American mathematics education scholar

Amy Roth McDuffie is an American scholar of mathematics education and a professor in the College of Education at Washington State University.

== Education and career ==
McDuffie majored in mathematics at Franklin & Marshall College, graduating in 1987. Next, she studied education at Johns Hopkins University, receiving a secondary mathematics teaching certificate in 1989 and a master's degree in technology for education in 1991. She completed a Ph.D. in mathematics education at the University of Maryland, College Park in 1998.

She joined Washington State University Tri-Cities as an instructor in 1998, became a tenure-track assistant professor in 2000, was tenured as an associate professor in 2006, and was promoted to full professor in 2013. In 2017, she moved to the main (Pullman) campus of Washington State University. From 2015 to 2019, she was associate dean for research and external funding for the university's College of Education.

In 2021, she began a two-year term on the Mathematics Standing Committee of the National Assessment of Educational Progress.

== Books ==
McDuffie is the coeditor of edited volumes including:

- Using Research to Improve Instruction (2014)
- Mathematical Modeling and Modeling Mathematics (2016)
- Transforming Mathematics Teacher Education: An Equity-Based Approach (2019)

== Recognition ==
In Spring 2025, Washington State University gave McDuffie the Chosen Coug award.
