= Willis McDuffee =

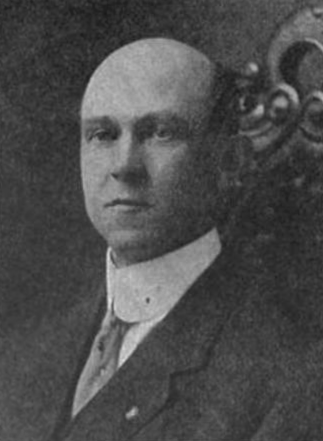
- Born: March 15, 1868; Rochester, New Hampshire
- Died: June 22, 1934 (aged 66); Rochester, New Hampshire
- Occupation(s): Editor, publisher, politician
- Spouse: Dora Haley (m. 1897)
- Children: 2

Willis McDuffee (March 15, 1868 – June 22, 1934) was an American newspaper editor and publisher and a leading progressive politician in New Hampshire.

== Biography ==
Willis McDuffee was born in Rochester, New Hampshire on March 15, 1868. He graduated from Dartmouth College in 1890. He married Dora Haley on July 2, 1897, and they had two children.

McDuffee was the editor of the Rochester Courier, and the president of the Courier Publishing Company starting in 1891. He was one of the main leading figures of the progressive movement in New Hampshire. He was however a supporter of William Howard Taft, and a key figure behind Taft getting the support of New Hampshire Republicans. He was also the campaign manager for Rolland H. Spaulding in his 1914 run for New Hampshire governor.

McDuffiee was on the school and library boards in Rochester and from 1914-1916 was a trustee of the New Hampshire College of Agriculture and the Mechanic Arts.

He died at his home in Rochester on June 22, 1934.
