= Allan McFee =

CBC radio and television announcer

Allan McFee (June 4, 1913 – December 12, 2000) was an often irreverent announcer for the Canadian Broadcasting Corporation's radio and television networks. Born in Belleville, Ontario, he joined the CBC in 1937, and remained with the network until his retirement in 1989. Even after his retirement, he continued to be the announcer for Max Ferguson's Sunday morning CBC radio show up to the beginning of 1998.

McFee was the announcer on such programmes as The Royal Canadian Air Farce, Sunday Morning and The Max Ferguson Show. He also hosted his own program, Eclectic Circus for almost twenty years running five nights a week until 1985 and then as a weekly program until 1989. In the show, McFee would converse with an imaginary mouse, a "small grey presence" which lived in his pocket, and play an eclectic array of obscure musical selections. Other sounds included imaginary chickens. Referring to himself as "your delightful host" and "the old musicologist," he would address his audience as "all those out there in vacuumland". He would often refer to the CBC as the "Canadian Radio Broadcasting Commission", the name of the precursor to the CBC that only existed for about four years in the 1930s. He took pride in his status as an employee without a contract, and, aware of his popularity, made his feelings about CBC's management known. CBC staffers passed on a legend that when a particularly pompous management memo was posted on the bulletin board, he used the opportunity to ostentatiously read it aloud, word for word, and then set it on fire.

He was married to Oonah McFee, a writer who won the Books in Canada First Novel Award for her sole published novel, Sandbars.
