= Oonah McFee =

Canadian writer (1916–2006)

- Born: Oonah Browne; September 11, 1916; Newcastle, New Brunswick
- Died: December 19, 2006 (aged 90)
- Occupations: novelist, short stories
- Spouse: Allan McFee
- Writing career
- Period: 1970s
- Notable work: Sandbars

Oonah McFee, née Browne (September 11, 1916 – December 19, 2006) was a Canadian novelist and short story writer, who won the Books in Canada First Novel Award for her 1977 novel Sandbars.

Born in Newcastle, New Brunswick and raised in the Ottawa Valley area, she worked for CBC Radio One's Ottawa station CBO-FM in the 1930s, and married her colleague Allan McFee in 1941. They later moved to Toronto, where Allan was an announcer for the CBC's national network, while Oonah began to study creative writing in the 1960s, publishing her first short story in Texas Quarterly in 1971.

Following her award win for Sandbars, she was writer in residence at Trent University in 1979, and continued to publish short stories and journalism. Sandbars was originally planned as the first volume in a linked quartet of novels, of which the first sequel was to be titled Silent Eyes, but the later books were never published.
