= Kyle Ryde =

British motorcycle racer (born 1997)

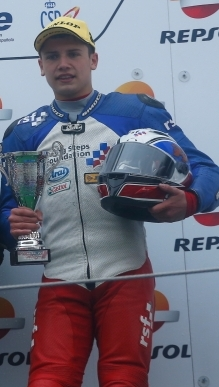
- Ryde in 2013
- Nationality: British
- Born: 22 July 1997 (age 29); Mansfield, England
- Current team: Nitrous Competition Ducati
- Bike number: 1
- Website: Kyle Ryde Racing
Motorcycle racing career statistics
Moto3 World Championship
Active years	2013
Manufacturers	KRP Honda
Championships	0
2013 championship position	NC (0 pts)
Starts / Wins / Podiums / Poles / F. laps / Points; 1 / 0 / 0 / 0 / 0 / 0
Superbike World Championship
Active years	2024
Manufacturers	Yamaha
Championships	0
2024 championship position	37th (0 pts)
Starts / Wins / Podiums / Poles / F. laps / Points; 1 / 0 / 0 / 0 / 0 / 0
Supersport World Championship
Active years	2015–2017
Manufacturers	Yamaha, MV Agusta, Kawasaki
Championships	0
2016 championship position	25th (14 pts)
Starts / Wins / Podiums / Poles / F. laps / Points; 21 / 0 / 1 / 0 / 0 / 73
British Superbike Championship
Active years	2017–2018, 2020–present
Manufacturers	Kawasaki (2017); Yamaha (2018); Suzuki (2020); BMW (2021); Yamaha (2022–2025); Ducati (2026–)
Championships	3 (2024, 2025, 2026)
2026 championship position	1st (596 points)
Starts / Wins / Podiums / Poles / F. laps / Points; 218 / 40 / 89 / 32 / 28 / 3360

Kyle Brandon Ryde (born 22 July 1997) is an English professional motorcycle racer, competing in the British Superbike Championship for Ducati. He is best known for being champion three consecutive times in the series, in 2024, 2025, and 2026. Ryde is also the 2019 GP2 champion.

In 2024, Ryde won his first British Superbike Championship, beating Tommy Bridewell by one point in the final race of the season. In 2025 he successfully defended his title, and again in 2026, when he switched over from Yamaha to Ducati machinery. As of the end of 2026, Ryde has 40 race wins, 89 podiums, 32 pole positions, and 28 fastest laps in the British Superbike Championship. He is contracted to remain at Nitrous Competitions Racing until at least the end of the 2027 season.

== Career ==
=== Early career ===
Ryde spent his early years until 2002 in Swanwick, Derbyshire, then moved to nearby Jacksdale, Nottinghamshire where he is still based.

Ryde contested the Red Bull MotoGP Rookies Cup in 2011 and 2012. He became the youngest ever British 125cc Champion by winning the 2011 British 125 Championship. He secured his second British Championship by winning the British National Superstock 600 Championship in 2014.

For 2015, Ryde stepped up to compete in the British Supersport Championship riding for Pacedayz European Trackdays aboard a Yamaha YZF-R6, finishing the season in second place. On 24 May 2015, he participated for the first time in a Supersport World Championship event, as a wild-card rider in the Great Britain round at Donington Park. He was classified third after having qualified on the front row in second place.

In early 2016, Ryde signed with an Italian team for his first season's racing in the Supersport World Championship on a Yamaha YZF-R6, but the team unexpectedly withdrew from competition without explanation after the first five events in May 2016. Ryde only missed one event, at Sepang, Malaysia. He later rode an MV Agusta F3 675 and a Kawasaki ZX-6R in the Supersport World Championship for Schmidt Racing, a team formed during late 2015 in Hungary, joining with teammate Nicolás Terol.

For the 2017 season, Ryde rode a Kawasaki ZX-6R in the Supersport World Championship as teammate to reigning Supersport World Champion Kenan Sofuoğlu, but parted company in early October before the season-end due to poor race performances.

=== British Superbike Championship ===
Ryde made his debut ride in British Superbikes for the last three races of the season in October 2017 at Brands Hatch on Billy McConnell's machine, who was injured at the Thruxton round in August and was unable to compete in any further races. Ryde finished in 15th, 17th and 18th.

After signing to ride for his old team boss Craig Fitzpatrick at CF Motorsports in the British Superbike Championship aboard a Yamaha YZF-R1 during 2018, Ryde announced in late June via social media that he was withdrawing from National circuit racing, with no immediate plans.

Ryde soon returned on 21/22 July at Brands Hatch, riding a Kalex in the British GP2 category within the British Supersport National Championship, placing 5th in the first leg and then winning in both his category and the Supersport race overall in the main event. Returning to the class in 2019, he won the championship.

For 2020, Ryde rode in the British Superbike Championship (BSB) for Stuart and Steve Hicken's Hawk Racing team under the Buildbase Suzuki brand, after a try-out at the final two rounds of the 2019 season. Ryde made a strong start to the 2020 season and achieved his first two BSB race wins at the Silverstone round.

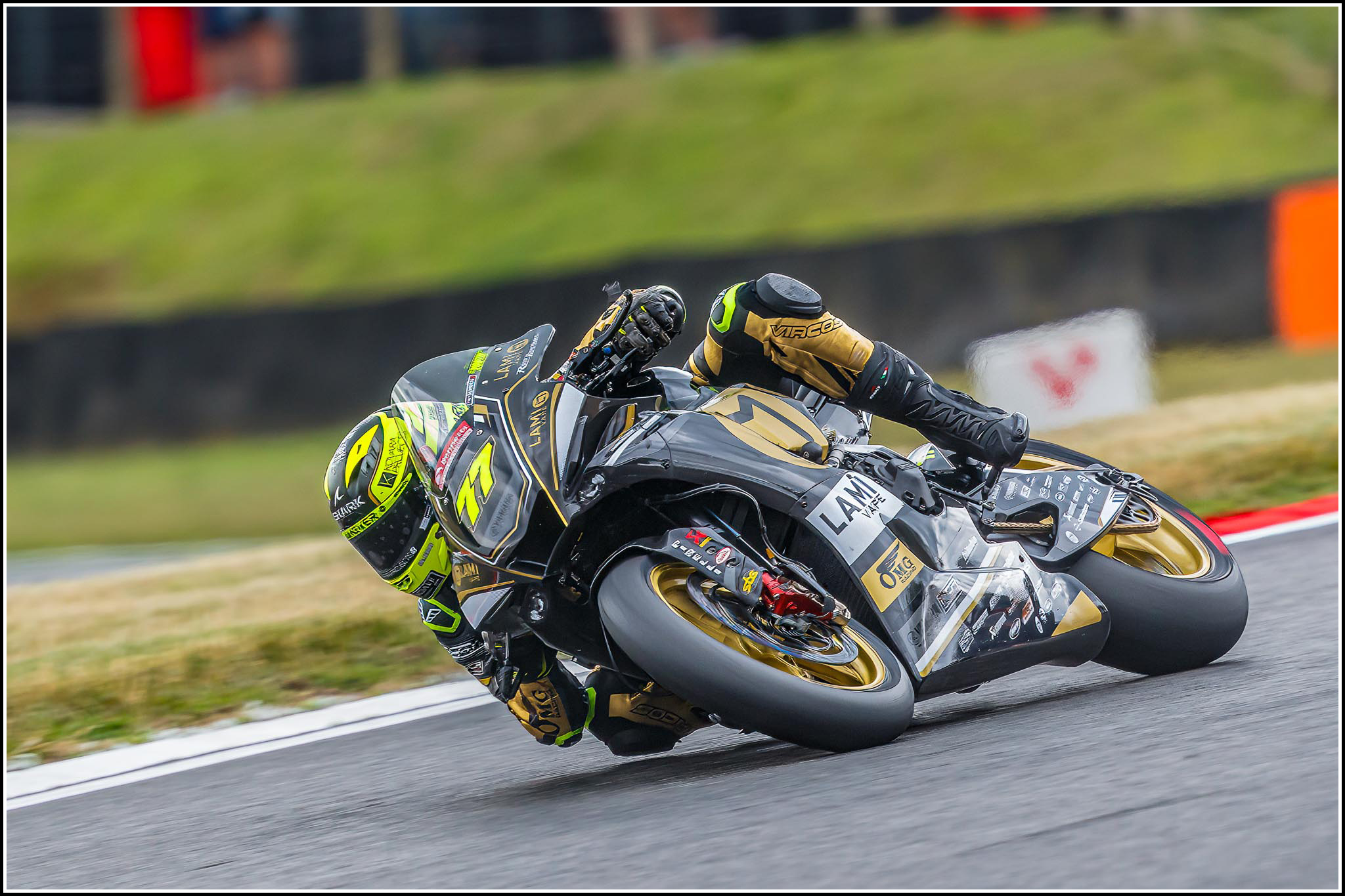
Ryde riding for OMG Racing at Brands Hatch in 2023

In 2021, Ryde switched to Rich Energy OMG Racing BMW to ride the new BMW M1000RR alongside Bradley Ray, finishing the season 15th overall with 118 points. After the final round at Brands Hatch, it was announced that Rich Energy OMG Racing would switch to Yamaha R1 bikes for the 2022 season, with Ryde and Ray continuing as the team's riders.

For 2022, Ryde rode in BSB with OMG Racing, switching to Yamaha machinery as used in 2021 by the McAMS team. For 2023 and 2024, Ryde continued with the same team and machinery – the first time in Superbikes that he had continued for subsequent seasons on the same machine.

2024 was a season to remember for Ryde as he celebrated a debut title in Bennetts BSB, taking the fight down to the last corner of the final lap against defending champion Tommy Bridewell to win the title for the OMG GRILLA Yamaha Racing Team for the second time.

In 2025, Ryde successfully defended his championship title after a close fought season-long battle with Bradley Ray, finishing 20 points ahead after Round 11 at Brands Hatch.

For the 2026 campaign, Ryde's team switched from Yamaha R1 to Ducati V4 R machinery, meaning Ryde's triple consecutive championships involved two different manufacturers. In preparation, Ryde purchased his own Ducati road bike for use on tracks in the winter including in Spain, prior to the 2026 UK race season.

== Career statistics ==
=== British 125 Championship ===
Year	Bike	1	2	3	4	5	6	7	8	9	10	11	12	13	Pos	Pts
2010	Honda	BRH	THR	OUL	CAD	MAL	KNO; C	SNE	BRH; 13	CAD; 14	CRO	CRO; 14	SIL; 6	OUL; Ret	**26th**	**17**
2011	Honda	**BRH**; Ret	OUL; 2	**CRO**; 2	THR; Ret	KNO; 1	SNE; 6	OUL	BRH; 1	CAD; 1	**DON**; 1	**SIL**; 1	BRH; 3		**1st**	**191**

=== Red Bull MotoGP Rookies Cup ===
==== Races by year ====
(key) (Races in bold indicate pole position, races in italics indicate fastest lap)

Year	1	2	3	4	5	6	7	8	9	10	11	12	13	14	15	Pos	Pts
2011	SPA1; 13	SPA2; 6	POR1; 12	POR2; 12	GBR1; 23	GBR2; Ret	NED1; 20	NED2; 14	ITA; 18	GER1; 12	GER2; 14	CZE1; 20	CZE2; 11	RSM; 7		19th	43
2012	SPA1; 4	SPA2; Ret	POR1; 6	POR2; 4	GBR1; 3	GBR2; 8	NED1; 12	NED2; Ret	GER1; 14	GER2; Ret	CZE1; 17	CZE2; Ret	RSM; 17	ARA1; 12	ARA2; 16	15th	70

=== FIM CEV Moto3 Championship ===
==== Races by year ====
(key) (Races in bold indicate pole position; races in italics indicate fastest lap)

Year	Bike	1	2	3	4	5	6	7	8	9	Pos	Pts
2012	Honda	JER	NAV	ARA	CAT	ALB1	ALB2	VAL; 9			25th	7
2013	KRP Honda	CAT1; Ret	CAT2; 3	ARA; 18	ALB1; 18	ALB2; 23	NAV; 9	VAL1; 15	VAL1; Ret	JER; 7	13th	33

=== Grand Prix motorcycle racing ===
==== Races by year ====
(key) (Races in bold indicate pole position; races in italics indicate fastest lap)

Year	Class	Bike	1	2	3	4	5	6	7	8	9	10	11	12	13	14	15	16	17	Pos	Pts
2013	Moto3	KRP Honda	QAT	AME	SPA	FRA	ITA	CAT	NED	GER	INP	CZE	GBR; 27	RSM	ARA	MAL	AUS	JPN	VAL	NC	0

=== Supersport World Championship ===
==== Races by year ====
(key) (Races in bold indicate pole position; races in italics indicate fastest lap)

Year	Bike	1	2	3	4	5	6	7	8	9	10	11	12	Pos	Pts
2015	Yamaha	AUS	THA	SPA	NED	ITA	GBR; 3	POR	ITA	MAL	SPA	FRA	QAT	19th	16
2016	Yamaha	AUS; 19	THA; Ret	SPA; 12	NED; 14	ITA; 15	MAL							25th	14
2016	MV Agusta							GBR; 21	ITA; 22					25th	14
2016	Kawasaki									GER; 17	FRA; 11	SPA; DNS	QAT; 14	25th	14
2017	Kawasaki	AUS; 4	THA; 5	SPA; 8	NED; 12	ITA; Ret	GBR; 11	ITA; 14	GER; 16	POR; Ret	FRA; 22	SPA	QAT	13th	43

=== British Supersport Championship ===
(key) (Races in bold indicate pole position; races in italics indicate fastest lap)

Year	Bike	1	2	3	4	5	6	7	8	9	10	11	12	13	14	15	16	17	18	19	20	21	22	23	24	Pos	Pts
2015	Yamaha	DON; 4	DON; 3	**BRH**; 1	**BRH**; 2	OUL; 3	OUL; 2	**SNE**; 2	SNE; Ret	KNO; 3	KNO; 1	BRH; 2	BRH; 2	THR; 2	THR; 6	CAD; 2	CAD; 3	OUL; Ret	OUL; DNS	ASS; 6	ASS; 5	SIL; 5	SIL; 5	BRH; 5	BRH; 4	2nd	344

=== British Superbike Championship ===
==== Races by year ====
Year	Bike	1			2			3			4			5			6			7			8				9			10			11			12			Pos	Pts
Year	Bike	R1	R2	R3	R1	R2	R3	R1	R2	R3	R1	R2	R3	R1	R2	R3	R1	R2	R3	R1	R2	R3	R1	R2	R3	R4	R1	R2	R3	R1	R2	R3	R1	R2	R3	R1	R2	R3	Pos	Pts
2017	Kawasaki																																			BRH; 15	BRH; 17	BRH; 18	28th	1
2018	Yamaha	DON; Ret	DON; 19		BRH; Ret	BRH; 20		OUL; Ret	OUL; 17		SNE; DNS	SNE; DNS																											NC	0
2020	Suzuki	DON; Ret	DON; 4	DON; 7	SNE; 10	SNE; 6	SNE; 10	SIL; 2	SIL; 1	SIL; 1	OUL; Ret	OUL; 13	OUL; 13	DON; 7	DON; Ret	DON; 14	BRH; 14	BRH; 11	BRH; Ret																				9th	137
2021	BMW	OUL; 7	OUL; 10	OUL; 12	KNO; 11	KNO; 15	KNO; 17	BRH; 16	BRH; 13	BRH; 16	THR; Ret	THR; 6	THR; 16	DON; 11	DON; 6	DON; Ret	CAD	CAD	CAD	SNE; 19	SNE; 15	SNE; 10	SIL; 8	SIL; 15	SIL; 17		OUL; 13	OUL; Ret	OUL; 15	DON; 2	DON; 6	DON; 15	BRH; 13	BRH; 10	BRH; 11				15th	118
2022	Yamaha	SIL; 2	SIL; 2	SIL; 10	OUL; 3	OUL; 4	OUL; 10	DON; 1	DON; Ret	DON; 4	KNO; 6	KNO; 9	KNO; 9	BRH; 5	BRH; 7	BRH; 7	THR; 13	THR; 18	THR; Ret	CAD; 12	CAD; 15	CAD; 16	SNE; 3	SNE; 6	SNE; 8		OUL; 9	OUL; Ret	OUL; 9	DON; 7	DON; 11	DON; 6	BRH; 9	BRH; 4	BRH; 10				6th	1077
2023	Yamaha	SIL; 1	SIL; 4	SIL; 7	OUL; 7	OUL; 5	OUL; 3	DON; 1	DON; Ret	DON; 1	KNO; 2	KNO; 1	KNO; 4	SNE; 13	SNE; 11	SNE; 8	BRH; 14	BRH; 7	BRH; Ret	THR; 8	THR; 6	THR; 7	CAD; 2	CAD; 2	CAD; 4		OUL; 6	OUL; 3	OUL; 6	DON; 12	DON; 1	DON; 12	BRH; 1	BRH; 3	BRH; 3				3rd	422
2024	Yamaha	NAV; 2	NAV; 3		OUL; 3	OUL; 5	OUL; Ret	DON; 1	DON; 5	DON; 5	KNO; 4	KNO; 14	KNO; 15	SNE; 3	SNE; 4	SNE; 5	BRH; 6	BRH; 3	BRH; 3	THR; 1	THR; 8	THR; 4	CAD; 1	CAD; 2	CAD; 1		OUL; 1	OUL; 13	OUL; 1	DON; 1	DON; 3	DON; 1	BRH; 4	BRH; 2	BRH; 1				1st	487
2025	Yamaha	OUL; 5	OUL; 4	OUL; C	DON; 2	**DON**; 2	DON; 5	SNE; 2	SNE; 4	SNE; 2	KNO; 2	KNO; 7	KNO; 11	BRH; 3	BRH; 2	BRH; 1	**THR**; 1	THR; 2	THR; 4	CAD; 2	CAD; 2	CAD; 1	DON; 2	**DON**; 1	**DON**; 1	DON; 1	ASS; 6	ASS; 8	ASS; 3	OUL; 3	OUL; 4	OUL; 5	BRH; 3	BRH; 2	BRH; 6				1st	522
2026	Ducati	**OUL**; 1	**OUL**; 1	OUL; 1	**DON**; 3	DON; 1	**DON**; 1	**KNO**; 1	**KNO**; 1	KNO; 3	SNE; 3	SNE; 3	SNE; 1	**BRH**; 1	BRH; 1	**BRH**; 2	**OUL**; 2	OUL; 1	**OUL**; 1	**THR**; 1	THR; 4	THR; 3	CAD; 2	CAD; 3	CAD; 3		ASS; 2	ASS; 3	ASS; 1	**DON**; 1	**DON**; 1	**DON**; Ret	**BRH**; 2	BRH; 3	BRH; 2				1st	596

=== Superbike World Championship ===
==== Races by year ====
(key) (Races in bold indicate pole position, races in italics indicate fastest lap)

Year	Bike	1			2			3			4			5			6			7			8			9			10			11			12			Pos	Pts
Year	Bike	R1	SR	R2	R1	SR	R2	R1	SR	R2	R1	SR	R2	R1	SR	R2	R1	SR	R2	R1	SR	R2	R1	SR	R2	R1	SR	R2	R1	SR	R2	R1	SR	R2	R1	SR	R2	Pos	Pts
2024	Yamaha	AUS	AUS	AUS	SPA	SPA	SPA	NED	NED	NED	ITA	ITA	ITA	GBR	GBR	GBR	CZE	CZE	CZE	POR	POR	POR	FRA	FRA	FRA	ITA	ITA	ITA	SPA	SPA	SPA	POR	POR	POR	SPA; 22	SPA; DNS	SPA; DNS	37th	0
