= Renald Castillon =

French motorcycle racer

- Nationality: French
- Born: France
Motorcycle racing career statistics
Moto3 World Championship
| Active years | 2014 |
| Manufacturers | Honda |
| Championships | 0 |
| 2014 championship position | NC (0 pts) |
Starts / Wins / Podiums / Poles / F. laps / Points; 0 / 0 / 0 / 0 / 0 / 0

Renald Castillon (born in France is a French motorcycle racer. Castillon has also been a competitor in the European Junior Cup in 2013.

== Career statistics ==
=== Grand Prix motorcycle racing ===
==== By season ====
| Season | Class | Motorcycle | Team | Number | Race | Win | Podium | Pole | FLap | Pts | Plcd |
|---|---|---|---|---|---|---|---|---|---|---|---|
| 2014 | Moto3 | Honda | Team RMS | 73 | 0 | 0 | 0 | 0 | 0 | 0 | NC |
| Total | | | | | 0 | 0 | 0 | 0 | 0 | 0 | |

==== Races by year ====
| Year | Class | Bike | 1 | 2 | 3 | 4 | 5 | 6 | 7 | 8 | 9 | 10 | 11 | 12 | 13 | 14 | 15 | 16 | 17 | 18 | Pos. | Pts |
|---|---|---|---|---|---|---|---|---|---|---|---|---|---|---|---|---|---|---|---|---|---|---|
| 2014 | Moto3 | Honda | QAT | AME | ARG | SPA | FRA; DNQ | ITA | CAT | NED | GER | INP | CZE | GBR | RSM | ARA | JPN | AUS | MAL | VAL | NC | 0 |
