= John McPhee (motorcyclist) =

British motorcycle racer

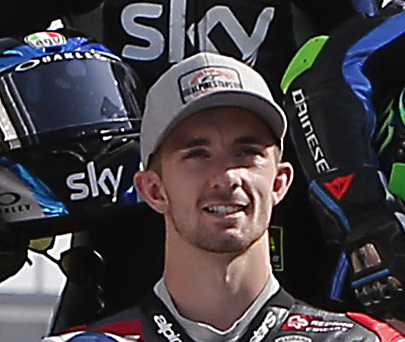
- McPhee in 2019
- Nationality: Scottish
- Born: 14 July 1994 (age 32); Oban, Argyll and Bute, Scotland
- Current team: MasterMac Honda
- Bike number: 17
- Website: John McPhee
Motorcycle racing career statistics
Moto2 World Championship
Active years	2021
Manufacturers	Kalex
Championships	0
2021 championship position	37th (0 pts)
Starts / Wins / Podiums / Poles / F. laps / Points; 1 / 0 / 0 / 0 / 0 / 0
Moto3 World Championship
Active years	2012–2022
Manufacturers	KRP Honda, FTR Honda, Honda, Peugeot, KTM, Husqvarna
Championships	0
2022 championship position	11th (102 pts)
Starts / Wins / Podiums / Poles / F. laps / Points; 179 / 4 / 16 / 5 / 4 / 917
125cc World Championship
Active years	2010–2011
Manufacturers	Honda, Aprilia
Championships	0
2011 championship position	31st (3 pts)
Starts / Wins / Podiums / Poles / F. laps / Points; 4 / 0 / 0 / 0 / 0 / 3
Supersport World Championship
Active years	2023–2024
Manufacturers	Kawasaki, Ducati, Triumph
Championships	0
2024 championship position	16th (54 pts)
Starts / Wins / Podiums / Poles / F. laps / Points; 42 / 0 / 1 / 0 / 0 / 109
British Superbike Championship
Active years	2025
Manufacturers	Honda
2025 championship position	16th (29 pts)
Starts / Wins / Podiums / Poles / F. laps / Points; 11 / 0 / 0 / 0 / 0 / 29

John McPhee (born 14 July 1994) is a Scottish Grand Prix motorcycle racer, currently competing in the British Superbikes Championship for MasterMac Honda.

Previously, McPhee raced in the World Supersport Championship for WRP Wepol Racing in 2024, and Vince64 by Puccetti Racing in 2023, with two stand in rides for Oli Bayliss in the D34G Racing Team that season. McPhee is also a former competitor of the British 125GP Championship, and the Spanish 125GP/Moto3 Championship.

McPhee made his Endurance World Championship debut in 2025 for Tati Team AVA6 Racing.

== Personal life ==
McPhee was born in Oban, Scotland. He has one son, Cameron, born in March 2024.

== Career ==
=== Moto3 World Championship ===
==== Caretta Technology (2012) ====
Making his Grand Prix debut in 2012, McPhee entered three rounds, Catalunya, Silverstone, and Brno, as a wildcard rider with the Racing Steps Foundation KRP Honda, fitted with a Honda NSF250R engine. For the final five races, he raced with Caretta Technology, replacing Alexis Masbou who broke his leg in a testing accident. McPhee scored one point in Brno, and earned himself a full-time ride for 2013.

==== Caretta Technology RTG (2013) ====
McPhee signed with Caretta Technology RTG for the 2013 season, replacing the Moto2 bound Louis Rossi. He partnered Jack Miller, and was outmatched throughout the whole year. Miller finished in seventh, McPhee finished in 19th, with five point scoring finishes, a season's best of seventh in Japan, and 24 points total.

==== SaxoPrint-RTG (2014–2015) ====
Staying with the re-branded SaxoPrint-RTG Honda team for the 2014 season, this time partnered by Efrén Vázquez, McPhee improved, and was a regular points finisher. He scored points in 11 of the 18 rounds that year, with a fourth place in Japan, and fifth in Australia on consecutive weekends being the highlight of the season. McPhee finished 13th in the rider's championship, with 77 points total.

In 2015, McPhee stayed with the Saxoprint RTG team, and was joined by Alexis Masbou. McPhee started the season well, with a fifth place in Qatar, and a sixth place in Austin. The real breakthrough came in round 10, when he took his first podium with a second place at Indianapolis: in a wet-to-dry race, McPhee pitted at the end of the formation lap for slick tyres, and finished almost 40 seconds behind race winner Livio Loi, who had started on slicks.

==== Peugeot MC Saxoprint (2016) ====
In 2016, McPhee had a difficult year on the team's new Peugeot bike, which proved uncompetitive in the dry. However, the Scot had several good results in wet conditions: seventh in Argentina, and sixth in Germany. In Brno, he took the lead after championship leader Brad Binder had crashed out, and despite almost highsiding on the penultimate lap, held on for his first ever Grand Prix victory, winning by over eight seconds. This made him the first Scottish Grand Prix race winner since Bob McIntyre in 1962.

Later in the year in Australia, McPhee was running in third place when he lost the front at Lukey Heights on lap 6, and was run over by Andrea Migno and Enea Bastianini, who were running right behind him. The race was red flagged, and John was taken to hospital in Melbourne, where he was diagnosed with a concussion, a broken thumb, and a punctured lung. The injuries meant McPhee spent nearly two months in Australia before he was able to fly home to Scotland. He finished the season 22nd in the standings, with 48 total points.

==== British Talent Team (2017) ====
McPhee had a successful 2017 riding for the new British Talent Team, starting off with two straight second places in Qatar and Argentina, where he also earned pole position. McPhee scored a third place in Assen later in the year, and ultimately finished the season seventh in the standings, with 131 points.

==== CIP Green Power (2018) ====
Following the surprise withdrawal of the British Talent Team from the world championship to focus on junior racing, McPhee spent the 2018 season riding a KTM for the CIP Green Power team. Although he occasionally ran at the front of the pack, including a fourth in Barcelona, a third in Germany, a fifth in Japan, and a third in the season closer at Valencia, the team struggled with a lack of funds, and McPhee regressed back to 12th in the standings, collecting 78 points during the campaign.

==== Petronas Sprinta Racing (2019–2021) ====
For 2019, McPhee joined the Petronas Sprinta Racing team, and on a competitive bike, he rediscovered his 2017 form. His season high point came at the French Grand Prix, where from pole position he out duelled eventual world champion Lorenzo Dalla Porta to pick up his second career win. McPhee also had a second place in San Marino, and a third place in Austria, ending the season in a career best fifth place in the championship.

Despite some speculation about moving up to Moto2, McPhee remained with the team for 2020. The season started well with a second place in Qatar, a second place in Jerez, a third place in Austria, and coming back from 17th on the grid at Misano to claim his third career win, moving him into championship contention. However, his form dipped in the second half of the season, and he wound up seventh in the final standings, with 131 points.

The 2021 campaign would start horribly for McPhee and Petronas Racing, as he retired from the first four races of the year, two unfortunate crashes which caught McPhee through no fault of his own, and two unforced individual errors from the Scot. He grabbed a third place finish for his only podium of the year in Austin, but otherwise capped off a disappointing season, down in 13th in the standings, with only 77 points.

==== Sterilgarda Husqvarna Max (2022) ====
Following Petronas Racing leaving Moto3, McPhee moved to Max Biaggi's Sterilgarda Husqvarna team, replacing Romano Fenati, who moved up to Moto2. The season started well for McPhee, with a fifth place finish in Qatar. He then suffered an injury after a Supermoto training accident, in which he fractured 2 vertebrae in his back. He was out for five rounds.

Despite this difficult start to the season, McPhee battled back and took his fourth and final win in the championship; after starting the race in 22nd, he worked his way up to the front group, starting the last lap in fifth place, taking the lead with just two corners to go by overtaking four riders in one move. He finished that season 11th in the standings, with a total of 102 points.

=== Moto2 World Championship ===
==== Petronas Sprinta Racing (2021) ====
Franco Morbidelli was unable to ride in the 2021 British motorcycle Grand Prix due to injury, and Brit Jake Dixon was given the opportunity to move up to MotoGP for his home race. McPhee rode Jake Dixon's Moto2 machine at Aragon and finished 20th from the 21 riders that finished the race.

=== World Supersport Championship ===
==== Vince64 by Puccetti Racing (2023) ====
In 2023, McPhee joined the World Supersport Championship, after hitting the age limit in the Moto3 World Championship and being unable to secure a Moto2 ride for the year. His Supersport career began with a third place finish in his maiden race in the championship, after a rain affected round at Phillip Island. His next best finish in the championship this year was a fourth place in Race 2 at Autodrom Most in Czechia, a race won by his compatriot, Tarren Mackenzie.

==== D34G Racing (2023) ====
Towards the end of 2023, McPhee parted ways with Vince64 by mutual consent, and instead stepped onto the Panigale v2, as a stand-in rider after Oli Bayliss was unable to compete due to injury. McPhee raced for the D34G team in the Aragon and Portimao rounds of the 2023 World Supersport season. He achieved two 13th place finishes and a 14th with the team, and ended the 2023 season 16th overall with 55 points.

==== WRP Wepol Racing Team (2024) ====
For 2024, McPhee joined the WRP Wepol Racing Team competing on Triumph machinery. He started the season well, with two eighth place finishes, before having a relatively consistent season with a best finish of seventh, achieved in Race 1 at Imola. He once again finished the season 16th, achieving just one less point that 2023.

=== FIM Endurance World Championship ===
McPhee made his endurance racing debut at the 2025 8 Hours of Spa-Francorchamps, for Tati Team AVA6 Racing, replacing the injured Martin Renaudin. Alongside teammates Charlie Nesbitt (replacing injured Randy Krummenacher) and Hugo Clère, the team achieved a seventh place finish overall, as well as second independent team, after running large periods of the race within the top-six.

“I enjoyed every minute of my first FIM Endurance Woprld Championship event. Thanks to Tati Team as well as my team-mates Hugo Clère and Charlie Nesbitt for a great weekend. It was a shame not to have Randy Krummenacher in the race with us, but he was a great help to me in adapting to the EWC and learning throughout the weekend. To finish as second independent team and first team on Pirelli tyres was a good achievement for us all.”

=== British Superbike Championship ===
McPhee joined MasterMac Honda alongside Charlie Nesbitt for the 2025 British Superbike season, riding a Honda CBR1000RR-R, and beginning his first season on a Superbike. His best result in the championship so far is ninth place, achieved at Race 1 at Donington Park.

== Career statistics ==
=== British 125 Championship ===
Year	Bike	1	2	3	4	5	6	7	8	9	10	11	12	13	Pos	Pts
2009	Honda	BHI; 17	OUL; Ret	DON; 15	THR; 23	SNE; 28	KNO; 17	MAL; 15	BHGP; Ret	CAD	CRO	SIL	OUL; Ret		**36th**	**2**
2010	Honda	BRH; 4	THR; 10	OUL; DSQ	CAD; 6	MAL; 9	KNO; C	SNE; Ret	BRH; 3	CAD; 2	CRO; 1	CRO; 3	SIL; 17	OUL; Ret	**5th**	**100.5**

=== FIM CEV Moto3 Junior World Championship ===
==== Races by year ====
(key) (Races in bold indicate pole position; races in italics indicate fastest lap)

Year	Bike	1	2	3	4	5	6	7	8	9	10	11	12	Pos	Pts
2012	KRP Honda	JER; 3	NAV; 3	ARA; 9	CAT; Ret	ALB1; 6	ALB2; 5	VAL; Ret						7th	60
2014	Honda	JER1	JER2	LMS	ARA	CAT1	CAT2	ALB	NAV	ALG	VAL1; Ret	VAL1; 3		20th	16
2016	Peugeot	VAL1	VAL2	LMS	ARA	CAT1; 11	CAT2; 9	ALB	ALG	JER1	JER2	VAL1	VAL2	23rd	12

=== Grand Prix motorcycle racing ===
==== By season ====
Season	Class	Motorcycle	Team	Race	Win	Podium	Pole	FLap	Pts	Plcd
2010	125cc	Honda	KRP Bradley Smith Racing	1	0	0	0	0	0	NC
2011	125cc	Aprilia	Racing Steps Foundation KRP	3	0	0	0	0	3	31st
2012	Moto3	KRP Honda	Caretta Technology	8	0	0	0	0	1	37th
2012	Moto3	KRP Honda	Racing Steps Foundation KRP	8	0	0	0	0	1	37th
2013	Moto3	FTR Honda	Caretta Technology RTG	17	0	0	0	0	24	19th
2014	Moto3	Honda	SaxoPrint-RTG	18	0	0	0	1	77	13th
2015	Moto3	Honda	SAXOPRINT-RTG	18	0	1	1	0	92	11th
2016	Moto3	Peugeot	Peugeot MC Saxoprint	16	1	1	0	0	48	22nd
2017	Moto3	Honda	British Talent Team	18	0	3	1	0	131	7th
2018	Moto3	KTM	CIP Green Power	18	0	2	0	0	78	12th
2019	Moto3	Honda	Petronas Sprinta Racing	19	1	3	2	1	156	5th
2020	Moto3	Honda	Petronas Sprinta Racing	15	1	4	1	0	131	7th
2021	Moto3	Honda	Petronas Sprinta Racing	17	0	1	0	0	77	13th
2021	Moto2	Kalex	Petronas Sprinta Racing	1	0	0	0	0	0	37th
2022	Moto3	Husqvarna	Sterilgarda Husqvarna Max	15	1	1	0	2	102	11th
Total				**184**	**4**	**16**	**5**	**4**	**920**	

==== By class ====
Class	Seasons	1st GP	1st Pod	1st Win	Race	Win	Podiums	Pole	FLap	Pts	WChmp
125cc	2010–2011	2010 Valencia			4	0	0	0	0	3	0
Moto3	2012–2022	2012 Catalunya	2015 Indianapolis	2016 Czech Republic	179	4	16	5	4	917	0
Moto2	2021	2021 Aragon			1	0	0	0	0	0	0
Total	2010–2022				**184**	**4**	**16**	**5**	**4**	**920**	**0**

==== Races by year ====
(key) (Races in bold indicate pole position, races in italics indicate fastest lap)

Year	Class	Bike	1	2	3	4	5	6	7	8	9	10	11	12	13	14	15	16	17	18	19	20	Pos	Pts
2010	125cc	Honda	QAT	SPA	FRA	ITA	GBR	NED	CAT	GER	CZE	INP	RSM	ARA	JPN	MAL	AUS	POR	VAL; 22				NC	0
2011	125cc	Aprilia	QAT	SPA	POR	FRA	CAT; 26	GBR; 15	NED	ITA	GER	CZE	INP	RSM	ARA	JPN	AUS	MAL	VAL; 14				31st	3
2012	Moto3	KRP Honda	QAT	SPA	POR	FRA	CAT; 19	GBR; 28	NED	GER	ITA	INP	CZE; 15	RSM	ARA; 22	JPN; 21	MAL; 22	AUS; 19	VAL; Ret				37th	1
2013	Moto3	FTR Honda	QAT; Ret	AME; 21	SPA; 11	FRA; 11	ITA; 16	CAT; 19	NED; 21	GER; 23	INP; 20	CZE; 13	GBR; 14	RSM; 20	ARA; 23	MAL; 17	AUS; 17	JPN; 7	VAL; Ret				19th	24
2014	Moto3	Honda	QAT; 11	AME; 9	ARG; Ret	SPA; 13	FRA; 8	ITA; Ret	CAT; 9	NED; 10	GER; 7	INP; Ret	CZE; Ret	GBR; 11	RSM; 13	ARA; Ret	JPN; 4	AUS; 5	MAL; Ret	VAL; 17			13th	77
2015	Moto3	Honda	QAT; 5	AME; 6	ARG; 15	SPA; 10	FRA; 17	ITA; 20	CAT; Ret	NED; 10	GER; 17	INP; 2	CZE; 10	GBR; 6	RSM; 19	ARA; 17	JPN; 9	AUS; Ret	MAL; 10	**VAL**; 7			11th	92
2016	Moto3	Peugeot	QAT; 27	ARG; 7	AME; 21	SPA; Ret	FRA; 20	ITA; 23	CAT; 15	NED; 16	GER; 6	AUT; 24	CZE; 1	GBR; 17	RSM; 20	ARA; 13	JPN; Ret	AUS; Ret	MAL	VAL			22nd	48
2017	Moto3	Honda	QAT; 2	**ARG**; 2	AME; 7	SPA; Ret	FRA; 12	ITA; 6	CAT; 12	NED; 3	GER; Ret	CZE; 6	AUT; Ret	GBR; 13	RSM; Ret	ARA; 6	JPN; 10	AUS; Ret	MAL; 5	VAL; 8			7th	131
2018	Moto3	KTM	QAT; Ret	ARG; 17	AME; 14	SPA; Ret	FRA; 12	ITA; 12	CAT; 4	NED; Ret	GER; 3	CZE; Ret	AUT; 12	GBR; C	RSM; Ret	ARA; 10	THA; Ret	JPN; 5	AUS; 14	MAL; Ret	VAL; 3		12th	78
2019	Moto3	Honda	QAT; 13	ARG; 21	AME; 14	SPA; 12	**FRA**; 1	ITA; 6	CAT; 13	NED; 5	GER; 6	CZE; Ret	**AUT**; 3	GBR; 7	RSM; 2	ARA; 4	THA; Ret	JPN; 6	AUS; 5	MAL; 7	VAL; Ret		5th	156
2020	Moto3	Honda	QAT; 2	SPA; Ret	ANC; 2	CZE; 5	AUT; 3	STY; Ret	RSM; 1	EMI; 10	CAT; Ret	FRA; Ret	ARA; 5	TER; 6	**EUR**; Ret	VAL; 11	POR; 9						7th	131
2021	Moto3	Honda	QAT; Ret	DOH; Ret	POR; 23	SPA; Ret	FRA; 4	ITA; 7	CAT; Ret	GER; 11	NED; 6	STY; 13	AUT; 7	GBR; 12		RSM; 13	AME; 3	EMI; Ret	ALR; Ret	VAL; 11			13th	77
2021	Moto2	Kalex													ARA; 20								37th	0
2022	Moto3	Husqvarna	QAT; 5	INA	ARG	AME	POR	SPA	FRA; 12	ITA; Ret	CAT; 7	GER; 19	NED; Ret	GBR; 7	AUT; 9	RSM; 9	ARA; 10	JPN; 7	THA; Ret	AUS; 6	MAL; 1	VAL; 11	11th	102

=== Supersport World Championship ===
==== Races by year ====
(key) (Races in bold indicate pole position, races in italics indicate fastest lap)

Year	Bike	1		2		3		4		5		6		7		8		9		10		11		12		Pos	Pts
Year	Bike	R1	R2	R1	R2	R1	R2	R1	R2	R1	R2	R1	R2	R1	R2	R1	R2	R1	R2	R1	R2	R1	R2	R1	R2	Pos	Pts
2023	Kawasaki	AUS; 3	AUS; 12	INA; 10	INA; 11	NED; Ret	NED; 17	SPA; 19	SPA; Ret	EMI; 19	EMI; 19	GBR; 20	GBR; 18	ITA; Ret	ITA; 14	CZE; 19	CZE; 4	FRA; 15	FRA; 19							16th	55
2023	Ducati																			SPA; Ret	SPA; 13	POR; 13	POR; 14	SPA	SPA	16th	55
2024	Triumph	AUS; 8	AUS; 8	SPA; 12	SPA; 17	NED; 11	NED; Ret	EMI; Ret	EMI; 19	GBR; 21	GBR; DNS	CZE; 20	CZE; 19	POR; 15	POR; 9	FRA; 19	FRA; 12	ITA; 7	ITA; Ret	SPA; 20	SPA; Ret	POR; WD	POR; WD	SPA; 8	SPA; WD	16th	54

* Season still in progress.

=== 8 Hours of Spa-Francorchamps Results ===
Year	Bike	Team	Riders	Pos
**2025**	**Honda CBR1000RR-R**	Tati Team AVA6 Racing	Charlie Nesbitt; Hugo Clère	7th

=== British Superbike Championship ===
==== Races by year ====
(key) (Races in bold indicate pole position; races in italics indicate fastest lap)

Year	Bike	1			2			3			4			5			6			7			8			9			10			11			Pos	Pts
Year	Bike	R1	R2	R3	R1	R2	R3	R1	R2	R3	R1	R2	R3	R1	R2	R3	R1	R2	R3	R1	R2	R3	R1	R2	R3	R1	R2	R3	R1	R2	R3	R1	R2	R3	Pos	Pts
2025	Honda	OUL; 15	OUL; 15	OUL; C	DON; 9	DON; 10	DON; 12	SNE; 11	SNE; 14	SNE; 14	KNO; 15	KNO; 16	KNO; Ret	BRH; 17	BRH; 16	BRH; Ret	THR; 18	THR; 16	THR; 18	CAD; 11	CAD; 12	CAD; 17	DON	DON	DON	ASS	ASS	ASS	OUL	OUL	OUL	BRH	BRH	BRH	16th*	29*

=== Suzuka 8 Hours ===
Year	Class	Team	Co-riders	Bike	Pos
2026	**EWC**	(Japan) F.C.C. TSR Honda France	(France) Alan Techer (France) Corentin Perolari	Honda CBR1000RR-R	26th

=== All Japan Road Race Championship ===
==== Races by year ====
(key) (Races in bold indicate pole position; races in italics indicate fastest lap)

Year	Class	Bike	1	2	3	4	5	6	7	8	9	10	Pos	Pts
2026	JSB1000	Honda	MOT	SUG1	SUG2	AUT1	AUT2	MOT1	MOT2	OKA	SUZ1; 10	SUZ2; 4	16th	25
