= Racing Steps Foundation =

The Racing Steps Foundation, abbreviated as RSF, was an organisation founded by Graham Sharp running from 2008 to 2017 with former Formula One driver, the late John Surtees as the ambassador for the organization.

RSF aided young British racing drivers in the junior categories of Formula Three, Formula Renault 2.0, Formula Renault 3.5, Indy Lights and karting. The Racing Steps foundation also ran a number of riders in the Moto GP Moto3 Class. Two drivers have graduated from RSF, and are now racing in the FIA World Endurance Championship.

== RSF members ==
At one time it had five drivers in five different formula racing categories being backed by the RSF. They were:

- Jake Dennis (Formula E, BMW i Andretti Motorsport)
- Alex Quinn (F4 British Championship, Fortec Motorsport)
- Oliver Rowland (GP2 Series, MP Motorsport, Formula E, Nissan e.dams)
- Ben Barnicoat (FIA European Formula 3 Championship, Hitech GP)
- Jack Harvey (Indy Lights, Schmidt Peterson Motorsports)

Motorcycle racers included:

- John McPhee (Moto3 World Championship)
- Rory Skinner (Moto3 World Championship)

RSF Graduates:

- Oliver Turvey (WEC LMP2, Jota Sport & McLaren F1 test driver)
- James Calado (WEC GTE Pro, AF Corse)

As well as drivers, a number of teams were affiliated with the organisation, they included:

- Carlin
- Fortec Motorsport
- Schmidt Peterson Motorsports
- Racing Team Germany
- ART Grand Prix
