= Ron Haslam =

British motorcycle racer

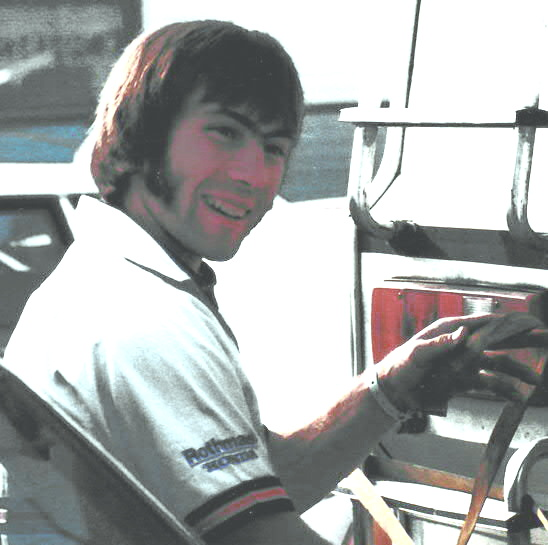
- Haslam in 1985 at the Bol d'Or races in the South of France
- Nationality: English
- Born: 22 June 1956 (age 70); Langley Mill, Derbyshire
Motorcycle racing career statistics
Grand Prix motorcycle racing
Active years	1977 – 1993
First race	1983 500cc South African Grand Prix
Last race	1993 500cc British Grand Prix
Team(s)	Honda, Suzuki, Cagiva, Norton
Starts / Wins / Podiums / Poles / F. laps / Points; 107 / 0 / 9 / 1 / 0 / 115

Ronald Haslam (born 22 June 1956) is an English former professional motorcycle racer. He competed in Grand Prix motorcycle racing between 1977 and 1993. Haslam raced motorcycles competitively for over thirty years, winning two World titles, four British championships and having ridden in almost 110 Grand Prix races. Haslam spends much of his time helping his son Leon Haslam in his racing career and previously trained riders and racers alike at his former Race School based at Donington Racetrack, Leicestershire.

During his career, Haslam gained the nickname Rocket Ron, with his son named similarly as Pocket Rocket.

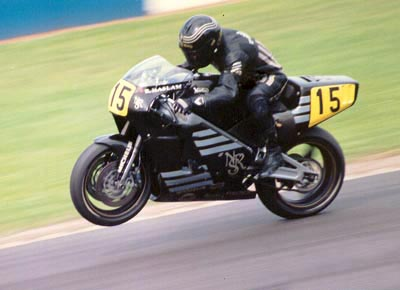
Haslam on a 1990s rotary-engined Norton

== Starting out ==
One of ten siblings from Langley Mill, near the Nottinghamshire/Derbyshire boundary, Haslam started racing in 1972 on a 750cc Norton Commando. At Cadwell Park, he finished seventh and eighth in wet and slippery conditions. He raced at a handful of meetings in 1972 and 1973. Following the death of his elder brother Phil in a racing accident at Oliver's Mount, Scarborough, in July 1974, he pulled out of the sport for the rest of that season. In 1984 another brother, Terry, was killed racing a sidecar outfit at Assen, the Netherlands. Despite those misfortunes, Haslam kept on racing, with his final competitive outing on a Ducati 998 at the Race of the Year at Mallory Park in October 2004.

== Early career ==
Initially, Haslam raced on British short circuits, at first under the sponsorship of Halifax car dealer Mal Carter and then with Honda Britain. In the 1976 season, he had 16 wins. In 1978, he rode 125, 250, 500, 1000cc, Superbike and F1 machinery and after adding a 350 to his stable the following year he became the first rider to win five different races in a day at Oulton Park and repeated the feat at Carnaby later the same season. Haslam has raced in many Endurance events, with his best result being a second in the 1979 Suzuka 8 Hours race in Japan.

== Career record ==
Haslam was runner-up in the 750 British championship in 1975, '76 and '77 and second in the British Formula One series in 1978. Between 1979 and '84, he won four British titles, the 1979 British TT Formula One, the 1981 MCN British Streetbike – when he won seven out of eight rounds – the 1982 British TT Formula One and the 1984 ITV World of Sport Superbike series. He has also won two World titles – the TT Formula One crown in 1979 and the TT Formula Three championship in 1980. Haslam won the grueling Macau GP six times – a record. He was also runner-up in the 1982 TT Formula One World Series. He is a world speed record holder, after his efforts on the 500 Elf on a private, banked circuit in France in 1986 when he claimed the Flying Kilometre, the Standing Start Mile and Standing Start 10 Kilometre records

== Motorcycle Grands Prix ==
Haslam made his Grand Prix debut at the 1977 500cc British Grand Prix at Silverstone on a 500 Suzuki, crashing out of the race. In 1982 Haslam raced in three more GPs on the experimental four-stroke Honda NR500. He finished in 12th at the Dutch TT at Assen in June, 11th the following weekend at the Belgian Grand Prix at Spa-Francorchamps and then 15th at Silverstone in August. At the end of the season, Haslam took the new two-stroke Honda NS500 to Malaysia and won the non-world championship Kuala Lumpur Grand Prix.

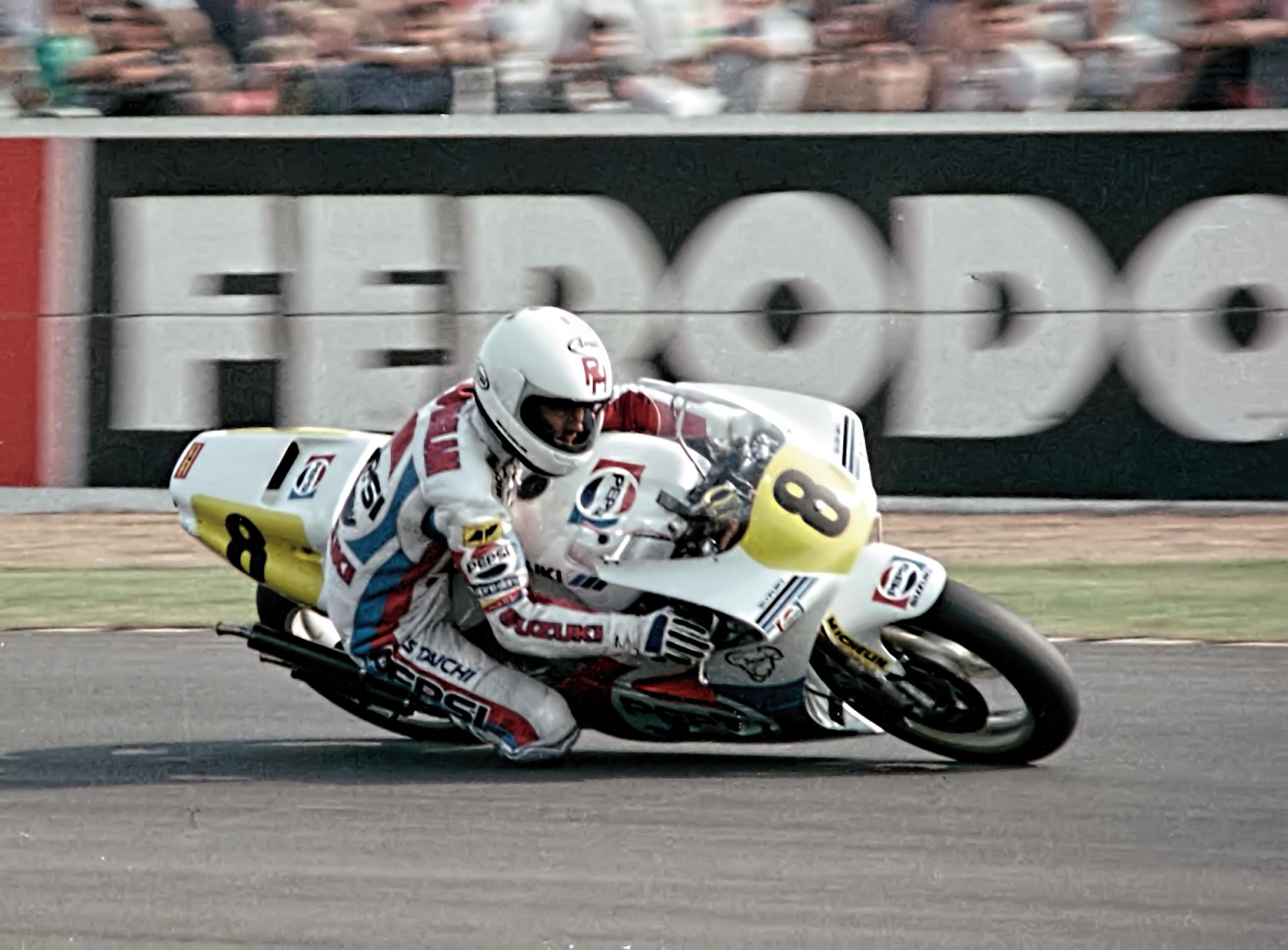
Haslam riding his Suzuki at the 1989 British Grand Prix

In 1983, Haslam was back for a full season on a factory Honda as teammate with American Freddie Spencer. He raced in the 500 class from then until the end of the 1990 season, spending three years developing the experimental Elf Honda race bike with its single-sided swinging arm front and rear suspension.

In eight years in the premier class, Haslam had 61 top ten finishes, including nine on the podium. His best result in 1985, his third and final year with Honda, was when he was second in the Dutch TT at Assen. Haslam was beaten to the line by Randy Mamola, but was nearly 23 seconds in front of third-placed finisher Wayne Gardner, who set the fastest lap of the race. He was third in eight other races, including the British Grand Prix at Silverstone in 1984 to Randy Mamola and Eddie Lawson. In his final season on the Italian Cagiva alongside Randy Mamola and Alex Barros. In 1987 when he ended the season fourth behind champion Wayne Gardner, runner-up Randy Mamola and third placed Eddie Lawson. Haslam was fastest in practice just once, at the Swedish Grand Prix at Anderstorp in 1984. These results put Haslam as Britain's second best Grand Prix competitor behind Barry Sheene.

== Macau ==
Haslam raced in the Macau Grand Prix six times at the Guia circuit and won a record-breaking six times. His first victory at the race in 1981 marked the first time a four-stroke had ever won there. His record of 6 wins was equalled by Michael Rutter at the 2005 meeting, and it's just broken at the 2011 one.

== Isle of Man TT Races ==
Haslam debuted at the 1978 TT races with a best place of fourth in the Formula Two race, later making his mark in 1981, when he was named winner of the Formula 1 race, only for the organisers to give the win the following day to Graeme Crosby. Haslam was back the following year to claim an undisputed victory.

== Transatlantic match Motorcycle Races ==
Haslam was a member of the British team in the then-annual Transatlantic Match Races between Britain and the United States. Haslam was at his best in the 1983, ending the three-day meeting as overall top points-scorer. In the opening round at Oulton Park on the Good Friday, Haslam was beaten to the finish line by Randy Mamola in the first of two, 11 lap races. Haslam, on the Honda NS500, equalled the lap record as he strove to beat the American. In race two, Mamola again came out on top, with both riders this time sharing the fastest lap, which was one tenth of a second off the record. At that point, Britain led 79 points to 69. At Snetterton two days later, Haslam notched-up victories in the rain, chased home each time by Kenny Roberts. Britain's lead had grown to 28 points, 161 to 133. In the dry at Brands Hatch the following day, Haslam again won both team races to lead Britain to a 245 to 198 victory. Haslam had scored 70 points of his team's total, 15 more than Roger Marshall and 30 better than the next best, Barry Sheene. The Langley Mill racer was the highest British points-scorer again in 1984, on a standard road-going Honda VFR750 in the series in 1986, on which he took two third places at Donington Park.

== Later racing career ==
After racing during 1990 in motorcycle Grands Prix with Cagiva, Haslam was back full-time in the UK in 1991 with Norton. He finished second in the British Superbike Championship, and stayed with Norton the following season.

In 1993, Halsam managed to score two points in the 500cc British Grand Prix in which took part as a wild card, with a 14th-place finish, surviving an incident-packed race. In the same race, Haslam's pupil, James Haydon, made his debut on the international scene by finishing in the points at 11th place. British Grand Prix fans witnessed an impressive performance when he took a self-tuned production Yamaha into 12th place in the 250 support race at the British Grand Prix at Donington Park in 1994.

In 1995, Haslam contested the first Triumph Speed Triple series, winning the Oulton Park round of the championship. When Haslam's son Leon Haslam switched from motocross to road racing in 1997, the elder Haslam concentrated his efforts on helping the youngster's career. He competed in the British 125 championship to give real practical assistance to Leon out on the track, and also took fifth place at Donington Park in 1998. Haslam rode the 125 again the following year, but pressure from the organisers made him stop after just a couple of rounds and restrict his coaching to the pits.

In 2000, Haslam raced a Honda Fireblade in the British Superstock series, marking his 28th year of competitive racing, with a best result of sixth at Donington Park. That same year, he and Leon made history by becoming the first British father and son, as well as the oldest and youngest riders, to race in the same Grand Prix when he competed on the Sabre Racing bike in the 500 class and Leon raced the factory Italjet in the 125 event at Le Mans, France.

== Present ==
Haslam was voted MCN Man of the Year in 1981. After retiring from competition, Haslam turned to running a racing school at Donington Park where he helped launch the careers of two top British riders, James Haydon and the late Karl Harris. Haslam is a qualified private pilot, and he flies a Renegade Spirit biplane (with flat-twin BMW engine).

In July 2020, Haslam announced his race training school of 24 years based at Donington Park would close later in the year due to difficulties encountered with Corona Virus restrictions. Their website confirmed the closure, dated 26 October 2020.

Haslam was awarded an honorary degree by the University of Derby in July 2023, in recognition of his racing career and on-track instruction to over 86,000 race pupils.

== Motorcycle Grand Prix results ==
Points system from 1969 to 1987:

**Position**	1	2	3	4	5	6	7	8	9	10
**Points**	15	12	10	8	6	5	4	3	2	1

Points system from 1988 to 1992:

**Position**	1	2	3	4	5	6	7	8	9	10	11	12	13	14	15
**Points**	20	17	15	13	11	10	9	8	7	6	5	4	3	2	1

Points system from 1993 onwards:

**Position**	1	2	3	4	5	6	7	8	9	10	11	12	13	14	15
**Points**	25	20	16	13	11	10	9	8	7	6	5	4	3	2	1

(key) (Races in bold indicate pole position; races in italics indicate fastest lap)

Year	Class	Team	Machine	1	2	3	4	5	6	7	8	9	10	11	12	13	14	15	16	Points	Rank
1977	500cc	Mal Carter	RG500	VEN -	AUT -	GER -	NAT -	FRA -	NED -	BEL -	SWE -	FIN -	CZE -	GBR; NC						0	NC
1978	500cc	Mal Carter	YZR500	VEN	SPA	AUT	FRA	NAT	NED	BEL	SWE	FIN	GBR; Ret	GER							NC
1979	500cc	Mal Carter	RG500	VEN	AUT	GER	NAT	SPA	YUG	NED	BEL	SWE	FIN	GBR; Ret	FRA						NC
1980	500cc	Mal Carter	YZR500	NAT	SPA	FRA	NED	BEL	FIN	GBR; DNS	GER										NC
1982	500cc	Honda-Britain	NR500	ARG -	AUT -	FRA -	ESP -	NAT -	NED; 12	BEL; 11	YUG -	GBR; 15	SWE -	RSM -	GER -					0	-
1983	500cc	HRC-Honda	NS500	RSA; 3	FRA; 3	NAT; NC	GER; NC	ESP; NC	AUT; NC	YUG; NC	NED; DNS	BEL; 8	GBR; 7	SWE; 9	RSM; 9					31	8th
1984	500cc	HRC-Honda	NS500	RSA; NC	NAT; 6	ESP; 4	AUT; 4	GER; 4	FRA; 4	YUG; 5	NED; 4	BEL; 5	GBR; 3	**SWE**; NC	RSM; 3					34	6th
1985	500cc	Rothmans-Honda	NSR500	RSA; 4	ESP; 8	GER; 3	NAT; 6	AUT; 16	YUG; 4	NED; 2	BEL; 6	FRA; 5	GBR; 14	SWE; 3	RSM; 5					73	5th
1986	500cc	Elf-Honda	Elf3	ESP; 10	NAT; NC	GER; 8	AUT; NC	YUG; NC	NED; 7	BEL; NC	FRA; 7	GBR; 9	SWE; 9	RSM; 9						18	9th
1987	500cc	Elf-Honda	NSR500	JPN; 5	ESP; 3	GER; 3	NAT; 5	AUT; 4	YUG; 4	NED; 5	FRA; 5	GBR; 7	SWE; 6							72	4th
1987	500cc	Elf-Honda	Elf4											CZE; 14	RSM; NC	POR; 9	BRA; 11	ARG; 10		72	4th
1988	500cc	Elf-Honda	Elf5	JPN; 12	USA; 7	ESP; 10	EXP; NC	NAT; 16	GER; NC	AUT; 8	NED; 13	BEL; 7	YUG; 9	FRA; 10	GBR; 14	SWE; 11	CZE; 7	BRA; NC		68	11th
1989	500cc	Pepsi-Suzuki	RGV500	JPN; 12	AUS; 7	USA; NC	ESP; 7	NAT; DNS	GER; NC	AUT; 7	YUG; 8	NED; 7	BEL; DNS	FRA; DNS	GBR; 7	SWE; 6	CZE; 8	BRA; 5		86	8th
1990	500cc	Cagiva	GP500	JPN; NC	USA; NC	ESP; DNS	NAT; DNS	GER; DNS	AUT; 12	YUG; NC	NED; 9	BEL; 8	FRA; 10	GBR; 10	SWE; 10	CZE; 12	HUN; 11	AUS -		46	15th
1991	500cc	Norton	NRV588	JPN -	AUS -	USA -	ESP -	ITA -	GER -	AUT -	EUR -	NED -	FRA -	GBR; 12	RSM -	CZE -	VDM -	MAL -		4	25th
1993	500cc	ROC-Yamaha	ROC	AUS -	MAL -	JPN -	ESP -	AUT -	GER -	NED -	EUR -	RSM -	GBR; 14	CZE -	ITA -	USA -	FIM -			2	37th
2000	500cc	-	NSR500	RSA	MAL	JPN	SPA	FRA; DNS	ITA	CAT	NED	GBR	GER	CZE	POR	VAL	BRA	PAC	AUS	0	NC

== Bibliography ==
- Haslam, Ron; Haslam, Leon; Broadbent, Rick (30 July 2009). Rocket Men. Bantam Books. ISBN 978-0553819366.

Sporting positions
Preceded by Mike Hailwood	TT Formula One World Champion; 1979	Succeeded by Graeme Crosby
Preceded by Barry Smith	TT Formula Three World Champion; 1980	Succeeded by Barry Smith
Preceded by Sadao Asami	Macau Motorcycle Grand Prix Winner; 1981–1983	Succeeded by Mick Grant
Preceded by Mick Grant	Macau Motorcycle Grand Prix Winner; 1985–1987	Succeeded by Kevin Schwantz
