= Shinichi Ito =

Japanese motorcycle racer

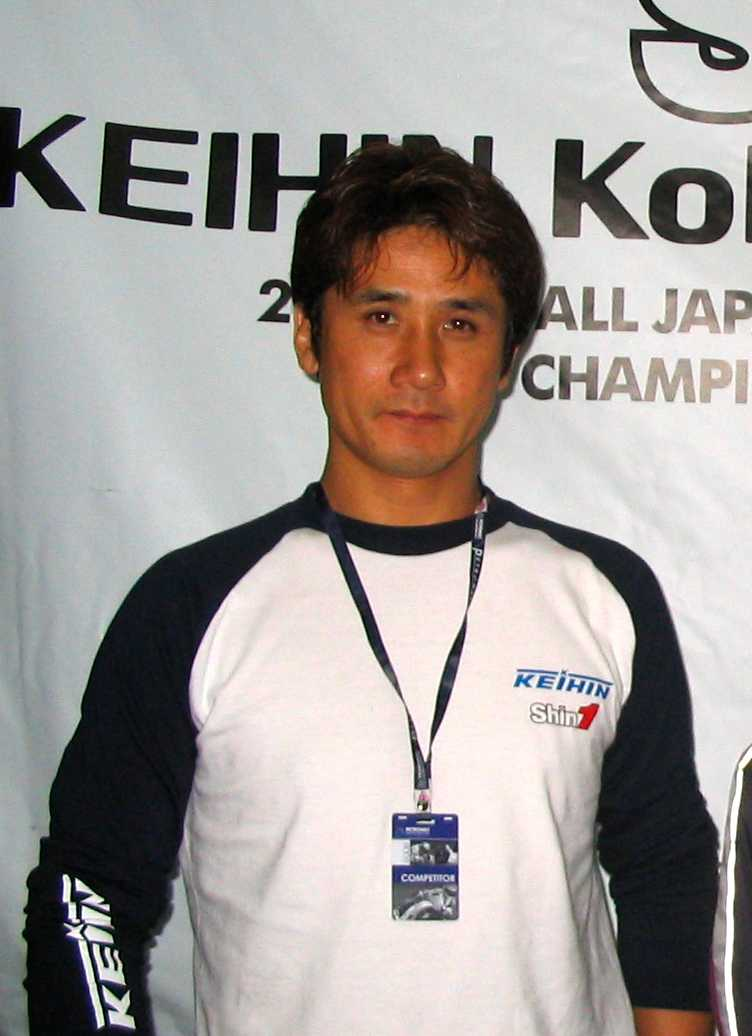
- Nationality: Japanese
- Born: December 7, 1966 (age 59); Kakuda, Miyagi, Japan
Motorcycle racing career statistics
Grand Prix motorcycle racing
Active years	1988–1996, 1999, 2002, 2005, 2007, 2011
First race	1988 500cc Japanese Grand Prix
Last race	2011 MotoGP Japanese Grand Prix
Team(s)	Honda, Ducati
Championships	0
2011 championship position	22nd (3 pts)
Starts / Wins / Podiums / Poles / F. laps / Points; 67 / 0 / 6 / 1 / 1 / 513

Shinichi Ito (or Itō) (伊藤 真一, Itō Shin'ichi) born December 7, 1966, in Kakuda, Miyagi, Japan) is a Japanese retired professional Grand Prix motorcycle road racer. He has raced extensively in Japanese and International championships. Ito has competed in the All Japan Road Race Championship, and won the Japanese 500 cc Championship, and is also three-time Japanese Superbike Champion. In the prestigious Suzuka 8 Hour Endurance Race, he has qualified on pole five times and won the race four times. Ito has also raced in Superbike World Championship. His considerable experience on different types of racing machine has earned him a reputation as a premier development rider.

== Career ==
=== Early career ===
Ito competed in the All-Japan 500 cc Championship on a Honda NSR500 from 1988 to 1992, always finishing inside the top-seven and winning the title in 1990. He raced in the Suzuka 8 Hour for three of these years and had two seventh-place finishes in 1988 and 1991, partnered by Masumitsu Taguchi and Daryl Beattie respectively. Ito has also competed in the 500 cc World Championships as an occasional wild card from 1989 to 1992. He showed impressive form, consistently finishing among the established Grand Prix riders. Ito scored a best finish of fourth at Suzuka in 1992.

=== 500cc/MotoGP World Championship ===
Ito's ability was rewarded in 1993 with a full-time ride from Honda in the 500 cc World Championship. This was the third bike alongside Mick Doohan and Beattie, and often had development parts - widely speculated to have included a fuel-injection system before anybody else got it. In his first full Grand Prix season, he scored four top-five finishes. Apart from three DNFs, he never finished outside the top-ten. His best result was at Hockenheim, Germany where he got pole position, followed by a third place in the race. He was also the first Grand Prix rider to break the 200 mph (321.86 km/h) barrier. He finished a creditable seventh in the Championship. He also raced in the All-Japan 500 cc Championship where he finished ninth.

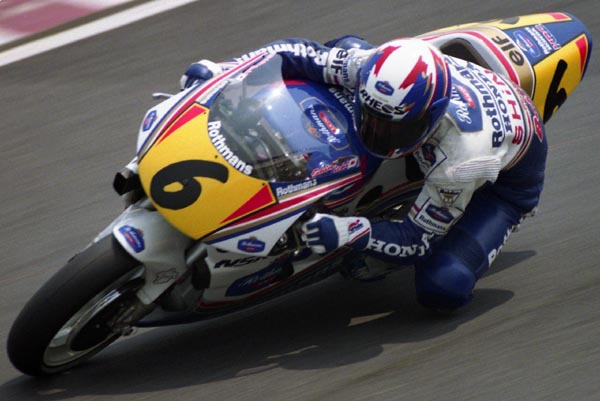
Ito at the 1993 Japanese Grand Prix

In 1994, Ito continued to show impressive form in the 500s scoring points in 11 out of 14 races, nine of which were top-five placings. His best result was at Brno where after qualifying seventh, he finished second in the race, just three seconds behind teammate Mick Doohan, in what was otherwise a very strung-out race. Ito finished seventh in the Championship. He again competed in the Suzuka 8 Hour, where he qualified second and finished third on a Honda RC45, partnered by Shinya Takeishi.

An elusive first 500 cc win still evaded Ito, until it seemed he might win his home race at Suzuka in 1995. In torrential rain, Ito used his vast experience of the Suzuka Circuit and pulled out a commanding lead in the race. With seven laps to go he was caught out by the treacherous conditions and crashed. This was to be his only non-score of what was to be a very consistent season. He visited the podium twice, his best finish was again second, this time at the final round at Catalunya. His consistency of point scoring races meant he finished a career-best fifth in the 500 cc Championship. By now a regular top-runner in the Suzuka 8 Hour, he qualified sixth and finished second on a Honda RC45, partnered by Satoshi Tsujimoto.

Ito's value as a development rider already recognised by Honda, in 1996 Ito moved from the Honda 500 V4 to their newly developed 500 cc V-twin Honda NSR500V in the World Championship. The V2 was underpowered compared to the V4 and Ito's best result was sixth at Catalunya. He was however regularly bringing the new bike home in the points, scoring in 12 of the 15 races. He finished in 12th place in what was to be his last full season in the Championship. In the Suzuka 8 Hour, he qualified second and finished 11th partnered by Satoshi Tsujimoto.

Ito returned to domestic racing, this time in the Japanese Superbike Championship on board a Honda RC45 and was one of the top riders in the series, winning the title in 1998 and finishing every other year in the top-five. He also took his debut win at the Suzuka 8 Hour in 1997 partnered by Tohru Ukawa. This duo repeated the feat in 1998 from pole position. They again took pole position in 1999, but were to retire after 146 laps. During this time, Ito had numerous more wild card rides in both the 500 cc World Championship and the World Superbike Championship, his best result being an impressive seventh place on a Honda 500 V4 at Suzuka in 1999.

In 2000, Ito was recruited by Kanemoto Racing, who had been contracted by the Bridgestone tyre company to conduct tyre testing for the company's foray into World Championship 500 cc racing. Alongside fellow Japanese rider Nobuatsu Aoki, Ito was responsible for the testing and development of Bridgestone tyres on Honda NSR500 machines. In the Suzuka 8 Hour, he qualified fifth and finished eighth in the race on a Honda VTR1000SPW, this time running in a three-man team with Tadayuki Okada and Alex Barros.

Now one of the most experienced top level development riders, Ito was given a Honda RC211V for the inaugural round of the new four-stroke MotoGP series at Suzuka. He qualified in third (0.2 seconds behind polesitter Valentino Rossi) and crossed the line in fourth. He made another appearance at the penultimate round in Australia, this time with the Kanemoto Racing team on an NSR500 two-stroke machine testing Bridgestone tyres. He qualified 13th but retired midway through the race. In the Japanese Superbike Championship, he made one appearance in the domestic series scoring a fourth at Suzuka.

Ito returned to the Japanese Superbike Championship full-time and won the title in 2005 and 2006 on a Honda CBR1000RR. Still a top rider in endurance racing, he was to take three more pole positions in the Suzuka 8 Hour. This equalled Wayne Gardner's record of five Suzuka 8 Hour poles. He won the race for the third time in 2006, partnered by Takeshi Tsujimura. Ito was still in demand at international level, and in 2005 was drafted in to ride a Ducati Desmosedici GP5 in a new Ducati-Bridgestone Tyre Test Team, which was specifically created for MotoGP tyre development. This role was to expand further when works Ducati rider Loris Capirossi was injured and unable to race in Round 16 at the Turkish Grand Prix. Ito took the seat, becoming the first Japanese rider to pilot the Ducati. He qualified 15th, but during the race was subjected to a pit lane ride through penalty for jumping the start. Ito failed to enter the pits and was black-flagged from the race, and thence excluded from the results.

Ito continued to work with the Ducati-Bridgestone Tyre Test Team during the off-season. He crashed during pre-season testing at Motegi and suffered a fractured thighbone, putting his 2007 season plans on hold. He returned for the Suzuka 8 Hour race in July and finished in third place having set the fastest lap of the race. He was partnered by Yusuka Teshima. Ito was given a ride on a Pramac d'Antin Ducati in the 2007 Japanese Grand Prix at Motegi following Alex Hofmann's release from the team.

At the Motegi GP in Japan in 2011, Ito and countryman Kousuke Akiyoshi were given wildcard rides in order to "bring courage and show support for the East Japan area", which has been suffering greatly in the aftermath of the 2011 Tohoku earthquake and tsunami. Ito, who came out of retirement that year to win the Suzuka 8 Hours and start the role as a HRC test rider, rode for a specially-formed HRC team at the age of 44.

== Career statistics ==
=== Grand Prix motorcycle racing ===
Points system from 1988 to 1992:

**Position**	1	2	3	4	5	6	7	8	9	10	11	12	13	14	15
**Points**	20	17	15	13	11	10	9	8	7	6	5	4	3	2	1

Points system from 1993 onwards:

**Position**	1	2	3	4	5	6	7	8	9	10	11	12	13	14	15
**Points**	25	20	16	13	11	10	9	8	7	6	5	4	3	2	1

(key) (Races in bold indicate pole position; races in italics indicate fastest lap)

Year	Class	Team	Bike	1	2	3	4	5	6	7	8	9	10	11	12	13	14	15	16	17	18	Pos	Pts
1988	500cc	Seed Honda	NSR500	JPN; Ret	USA	ESP	EXP	NAT	GER	AUT	NED	BEL	YUG	FRA	GBR	SWE	CZE	BRA				NC	0
1989	500cc	HRC Honda	NSR500	JPN; 10	AUS	USA	ESP	NAT	GER	AUT	YUG	NED	BEL	FRA	GBR	SWE	CZE	BRA				32nd	6
1990	500cc	Pentax Honda	NSR500	JPN; 9	USA	ESP	NAT	GER	AUT	YUG	NED	BEL	FRA	GBR	SWE	CZE	HUN	AUS				26th	7
1991	500cc	Pentax Honda	NSR500	JPN; 16	AUS	USA	ESP	ITA	GER	AUT	EUR	NED	FRA	GBR	RSM	CZE	VDM	MAL				NC	0
1992	500cc	HRC Honda	NSR500	JPN; 4	AUS	MAL	ESP	ITA	EUR	GER	NED	HUN	FRA	GBR	BRA	RSA						16th	10
1993	500cc	Rothmans Honda	NSR500	AUS; 7	MAL; 6	JPN; 4	ESP; Ret	AUT; 6	**GER**; 3	NED; 6	EUR; Ret	RSM; 4	GBR; 5	CZE; 7	ITA; 8	USA; 6	FIM; Ret					7th	119
1994	500cc	HRC Honda	NSR500	AUS; 5	MAL; 3	JPN; 3	ESP; Ret	AUT; 4	GER; 6	NED; Ret	ITA; 5	FRA; 5	GBR; 9	CZE; 2	USA; 4	ARG; 4	EUR; Ret					7th	141
1995	500cc	Repsol Honda	NSR500	AUS; 10	MAL; 7	JPN; Ret	ESP; 8	GER; 3	ITA; 4	NED; 8	FRA; 4	GBR; 6	CZE; 5	BRA; 10	ARG; 9	EUR; 2						5th	127
1996	500cc	Repsol Honda	NSR500V	MAL; Ret	INA; 13	JPN; 11	ESP; 9	ITA; 8	FRA; Ret	NED; 10	GER; 9	GBR; 10	AUT; Ret	CZE; 10	IMO; 9	CAT; 6	BRA; 11	AUS; 9				12th	77
1999	500cc	Lucky Strike Honda	NSR500	MAL	JPN; 7	ESP	FRA	ITA	CAT	NED	GBR	GER	CZE	IMO	VAL	AUS	RSA	BRA	ARG			21st	9
2002	MotoGP	Team HRC	RC211V	JPN; 4	RSA	ESP	FRA	ITA	CAT	NED	GBR	GER	CZE	POR	BRA	PAC	MAL					21st	13
2002	MotoGP	Kanemoto Honda	NSR500															AUS; Ret	VAL			21st	13
2005	MotoGP	Marlboro Ducati	GP5	ESP	POR	CHN	FRA	ITA	CAT	NED	USA	GBR	GER	CZE	JPN	MAL	QAT	AUS	TUR; DSQ	VAL		NC	0
2007	MotoGP	Pramac d'Antin Ducati	GP7	QAT	ESP	TUR	CHN	FRA	ITA	CAT	GBR	NED	GER	USA	CZE	RSM	POR	JPN; 15	AUS	MAL	VAL	26th	1
2011	MotoGP	Honda Racing Team	RC212V	QAT	SPA	POR	FRA	CAT	GBR	NED	ITA	GER	USA	CZE	INP	RSM	ARA	JPN; 13	AUS	MAL	VAL	22nd	3

=== Suzuka 8 Hours results ===
Year	Team	Co-Rider	Bike	Pos
1997	(Japan) Hori-Pro Honda with HARC	(Japan) Shinichi Itoh (Japan) Tohru Ukawa	Honda RC45	1st
1998	(Japan) Lucky Strike Honda & Iwaki	(Japan) Shinichi Itoh (Japan) Tohru Ukawa	Honda RC45	1st
2006	(Japan) F.C.C.-TSR ZIP-FM Racing	(Japan) Shinichi Ito (Japan) Takeshi Tsujimura	Honda CBR1000RR	1st
2011	(Japan) F.C.C.-TSR Honda	(Japan) Ryuichi Kiyonari (Japan) Kousuke Akiyoshi (Japan) Shinichi Itoh	CBR1000RRW	1st
