= Haslem =

Haslem is a surname, a variant of Haslam, a surname originating in England. Notable people with the surname include:

- Graeme Haslem (b. 1940), Australian rules footballer
- John Haslem (politician) (born 1939), Australian politician
- John Haslem (artist) (1808–1884), English china and enamel painter, and writer
- Thomas Haslem (fl. 1871), plaintiff in Haslem v. Lockwood
- Udonis Haslem (born 1980), American basketball player

== See also ==
- Haslam (surname)
