= Haslam =

Haslam may refer to:

- Haslam (surname)
- Haslam, South Australia, a town and locality in Australia
- Haslam Creek, a place on Vancouver Island in Canada, part of the Trans Canada Trail
- Haslam Heights, a line of peaks in Graham Land, Antarctica
- Haslam Lake, a lake in British Columbia, Canada
- Haslam Park, a park in the Ashton-on-Ribble area of Preston, Lancashire, England
- Haslam Park Primary School, in Bolton, Lancashire
- Haslam Shoals, located off the coast of Malaysia near Kuantan

== See also ==
- Haslum, a district in the municipality of Bærum, Norway.
