= Haslam (surname) =

Haslam is a surname originating in England since the Anglo Saxons. One source says it originated from a village in Lancashire that doesn't exist anymore called Haesel-hamm which is Old English for Hazel-Wood Farm. Another is Hasland in Derbyshire, which makes sense because records show the surname originated from the county before emigrating to Oxfordshire in the 15th century and later to Lancashire where the surname is most common, strongly around Bolton.. William Haslam (1563–1592) was married to Alice Woodfall, sister to Lady Margareta Woodfall whom married William Thomas Parr, son to John Lyngfield (John Hunt or Huntley) who eloped with Anne Bourchier, wife to William Parr, Marquess of Northampton, brother to Katharine Parr, King Henry VIII's sixth and last wife. Haslam began appearing in Ireland after Oliver Cromwell's conquest in the mid-17th century, and in the early 19th century have emigrated to Canada and the United States, mostly around Maryland and Pennsylvania before later moving to Tennessee and the west coast. Convicts with Haslam around that time were sent to Tasmania and New South Wales in Australia, and later immigrants arrived in Adelaide, South Australia and New Zealand.

== Notable people ==
- Alfred Seale Haslam (1844–1927), knight, engineer, mayor of Derby
- Alexander Haslam (born 1962), British psychologist
- Andrew Haslam (1846–1923), Canadian politician
- Annie Haslam (born 1947), English singer and songwriter
- Bill Haslam (born 1958), businessman and former governor of the state of Tennessee; son of Jim and brother of Jimmy and husband of Crissy
- Chris Haslam (born 1980), Canadian professional skateboarder
- Crissy Haslam (born 1958), philanthropist, educator advocate and former first lady of Tennessee; wife of Bill
- Dave Haslam, author and DJ
- David Haslam (physician) (born 1949), British medical doctor, writer and administrator
- David Haslam (GP) (1962–2021), past chair of the Royal College of General Practitioners
- David W. Haslam (1923–2009), Royal Navy hydrographer
- Dee Haslam (born 1954), businesswoman; wife of Jimmy
- Edwin Haslam (1932–2013), physical organic chemist and author
- Fred Haslam (game designer), game designer
- Fred Haslam (footballer) (1899–1971), English footballer
- George Haslam (footballer) (1898–1980), English footballer
- Gerald Haslam (1937–2021), author
- Harry Haslam (footballer, born 1921) (1921–1986)
- Henry Haslam (footballer) (1879–1942), British footballer
- Jim Haslam (born 1930), businessman and philanthropist of Knoxville, Tennessee; father of Jimmy and Bill
- Jimmy Haslam (born 1954), businessman and sports executive of Knoxville, Tennessee; son of Jim and brother of Bill
- Jonathan Haslam (born 1951), American Professor of the History of International Relations, Institute for Advanced Study
- John Haslam (1764–1844), British physician known for his writings on mental illness
- Juliet Haslam (born 1969), Australian field hockey player
- Karen Haslam (born 1946), Canadian politician
- Lee Haslam (born 1975 or 1976), British disc jockey and music producer
- Leon Haslam (born 1983), motorcycle racer, son of Ron
- Lewis Haslam (1856–1922), British politician
- LuAnn Haslam (1953), former American child actress
- Mark Haslam (born 1972), New Zealand cricketer
- Nicholas Haslam (born 1939), society interior designer, columnist, and bon viveur
- Robert Haslam (Pony Express) (1840–1912), Pony Express rider
- Radeem Haslam (born 1991), Jamaican record producer and businessman
- Robert Haslam (industrialist) (1923–2002), chairman of British Coal and British Steel
- Ron Haslam (born 1956), motorcycle road racer
- William Haslam (clergyman) (1818–1905), the English parson who was converted by his own sermon, author of several books
- William Haslam (1850–1898), South Australian politician
- Jorge Guillermo Borges Haslam (1874–1938), Argentine lawyer, teacher and philosopher, also notable for being Jorge Luis Borges's father

== See also ==
- Haslem, surname
- Heslam, surname
