= Fred Haslam =

Fred Haslam may refer to:

- Fred Haslam (game designer)
- Fred Haslam (Quaker)
- Fred Haslam (footballer)
