= Alex Barros =

Brazilian motorcycle racer

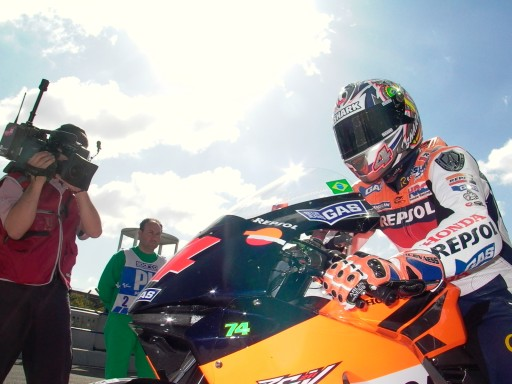
- Barros aboard the Honda RC211V in Jerez 2004
- Born: October 18, 1970 (age 56); São Paulo, Brazil
Statistics
MotoGP World Championship
Active years	2002–2005, 2007
Championships	0
Team(s)	Honda (2002, 2004–2005); Yamaha (2003); Ducati (2007)
Last season (2007)	10th (115 pts)
Starts / Wins / Podiums / Poles / F. laps / Points; 82 / 3 / 14 / 2 / 6 / 732
500cc World Championship
Active years	1990–2001
Championships	0
Team(s)	Cagiva (1990–1992); Suzuki (1993–1994); Honda (1995–2001)
Last season (2001)	4th (182 pts)
Starts / Wins / Podiums / Poles / F. laps / Points; 163 / 4 / 18 / 3 / 8 / 1,347
250cc World Championship
Active years	1988–1989
Championships	0
Team(s)	Yamaha
Last season (1989)	18th (30 pts)
Starts / Wins / Podiums / Poles / F. laps / Points; 14 / 0 / 0 / 0 / 0 / 30
80cc World Championship
Active years	1986–1987
Championships	0
Team(s)	Rieju, Autisa, Casal, Arbizu
Last season (1987)	17th (8 pts)
Starts / Wins / Podiums / Poles / F. laps / Points; 17 / 0 / 0 / 0 / 0 / 14
Superbike World Championship
Active years	2006
Championships	0
Manufacturer	Honda
Last season (2006)	6th (246 pts)
Starts / Wins / Podiums / Poles / F. laps / Points; 24 / 1 / 6 / 8 / 2 / 246

Alexandre Abrahão Coelho de Barros (born October 18, 1970) is a Brazilian former professional motorcycle road racer who is a seven-time 500cc/MotoGP race winner and also a race winner in Superbike World Championship. After a long Grand Prix career, in 2006 he moved to the Superbike World Championship. He returned to MotoGP for 2007, but retired by the end of the season.

== Career ==
=== Early career ===
Barros started racing motorcycles at the age of eight, when he won on his debut in the Brazilian minibike championship. In the next two years, he was twice Brazilian moped champion. In 1981, he was the Brazilian 50cc Champion, and in 1985 he won the title of Brazilian's 250cc category. The year of 1986 saw his international début in the 80cc category—he lied about his age so he could race at the Spanish Grand Prix at the age of 15. He finished the championship in sixteenth place, scoring six points. In 1987, he also raced the 80cc championship, finishing seventeenth, scoring eight points.

=== 250cc World Championship ===
In 1988, Barros made his first race on the World Championship 250cc category, scoring no points. That same year, he was third in the Latin American circuit of that same class. The next year, he finished 18th in the World Championship, scoring 30 points.

=== 500cc & MotoGP World Championship ===
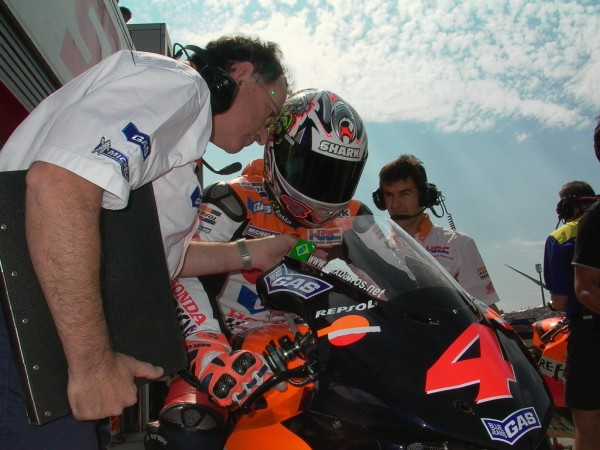
Alex Barros at Motegi in 2004

In 1990, Barros was the youngest rider in history to join the top motorcycling category, the 500cc, at the age of 20. In his first year, he was 12th overall, with 57 points. Notable results included eighth in the United States and Germany, and fifth in the Belgium Grand Prix. Two years later, his first podium: a third place in the Netherlands.

The year of 1993 saw his breakthrough as he joined the Suzuki team. After qualifying third in the US Grand Prix, Barros had his first victory in Spain, finishing that year's world championship in sixth place. His teammate Kevin Schwantz was that year's champion. The following year, Barros scored in all but one of the races. 1996 saw his best performance yet, finishing the championship at fourth, a feat he repeated in 2000, 2001 and 2002. His win at Mugello in 2001, was the latest by a rider other than Valentino Rossi until 2009. In 2002, the first of MotoGP (with engine displacement capacity increased to up to 990cc) he scored 204 points and won races at Motegi (the first race where he switched from the NSR500 to RC211V) and Valencia, eleven points behind second place. 2003 was a difficult one for Barros due to injuries, but in 2004, he once again finished the championship in fourth, in a season dominated by Valentino Rossi, Sete Gibernau and Max Biaggi. In 2005, Barros returned to the top of the podium in Portugal, however he did not mount a lasting championship challenge, and was not offered a ride for 2006. He returned to MotoGP in 2007, riding a Ducati GP7 for Pramac d'Antin. In pre-season testing he matched the factory Ducatis, and at midseason, he was ahead of the factory rider Loris Capirossi. He came third at Mugello (ahead of Stoner) and fourth at Istanbul Park.

=== Superbike World Championship ===
For 2006, Barros was hired by the Klaffi Honda team in the Superbike World Championship (WSBK), paying around £100,000 of his own money to fund the ride. After a satisfactory debut weekend with two top-ten finishes, he took a pair of podium finishes at Round 2 in Phillip Island, and a second and a fourth in round four at Monza. At Brands Hatch, he failed to qualify for Superpole, but bounced back from 18th on the grid to take a pair of top-ten finishes. The wet meeting at Assen was a disappointment for Barros, especially as he is a wet-weather expert.

Barros' season was characterised by poor starts, but despite this, he ended the season as the second highest Honda rider in the championship in sixth place, behind former champion James Toseland. At Imola, he took his only WSBK win, and followed it with a second place in race 2.

=== Brazilian Superbike ===
After retiring from Motogp, Barros is still actively racing. He is still competitive and has won several victories in the Brazilian SuperBike Championship.

Barros won the 2016 Brazilian SuperBike final riding a BMW S1000RR. He is known as the owner of the BMW Motorrad Alex Barros Racing Team, which he formed after retiring from the world of MotoGP racing, his last work in the 2007 season. And during the final of the Brazilian Superbike series (BRSBK), he tried to compete in the last series in São Paulo.

In the final session of the BMW S1000RR-powered team, the team was once again able to win the championship with four podium finishes. Including when Barros himself, who holds 276 starts in MotoGP, tried to compete in that final. In race 1, Barros was second behind Diego Faustino, the BRSBK champion, and first in race 2 beating Diego by 6.8 seconds. Barros is now in ninth place in the standings after the two races of the final round of the BRSBK.

Barros won the 2020 championship in the Superbike Master Senior class, and in 2021 he won in the Superbike PRO Master class.

=== Suzuka 8 Hours ===
In 1999, Barros and Japanese teammate Tadayuki Okada won the Suzuka 8 Hours endurance race riding a Honda RC45 superbike.

== Career statistics ==
=== Grand Prix motorcycle racing ===
==== By class ====
Class	Season	Race	Win	Podium	Pole	FLap	Pts
80cc	1986–1987	17	0	0	0	0	14
250cc	1988–1989	14	0	0	0	0	30
500cc	1990–2001	163	4	18	3	8	1,347
MotoGP	2002–2005, 2007	82	3	14	2	6	732
Total	1986–2005, 2007	276	7	32	5	14	2,123

==== Races by year ====
Points system from 1969 to 1987:

**Position**	1	2	3	4	5	6	7	8	9	10
**Points**	15	12	10	8	6	5	4	3	2	1

Points system from 1988 to 1992:

**Position**	1	2	3	4	5	6	7	8	9	10	11	12	13	14	15
**Points**	20	17	15	13	11	10	9	8	7	6	5	4	3	2	1

Points system from 1993 onwards:

**Position**	1	2	3	4	5	6	7	8	9	10	11	12	13	14	15
**Points**	25	20	16	13	11	10	9	8	7	6	5	4	3	2	1

(key) (Races in bold indicate pole position; races in italics indicate fastest lap)

Year	Class	Team	Bike	1	2	3	4	5	6	7	8	9	10	11	12	13	14	15	16	17	18	Pos	Pts
1986	80cc	Rieju		SPA; Ret	NAT; Ret	GER; 11	AUT; 23	YUG; Ret	NED; Ret													16th	6
1986	80cc	Autisa								GBR; 8	RSM; 8	BWU; DNS										16th	6
1987	80cc	Casal		SPA; Ret	GER; 11	NAT; Ret	AUT; 8	YUG; 10	NED; 22	GBR	CZE; Ret											17th	8
1987	80cc	Arbizu										RSM; 7	POR; Ret									17th	8
1988	250cc	Venemotos Yamaha	TZ250	JPN	USA	SPA	EXP	NAT	GER	AUT	NED	BEL	YUG	FRA	GBR	SWE	CZE	BRA; Ret				NC	0
1989	250cc	Venemotos Yamaha	TZ250	JPN; Ret	AUS; 10	USA; 16	SPA; DNQ	NAT; 15	GER; DNQ	AUT; 19	YUG; 15	NED; Ret	BEL; Ret	FRA; Ret	GBR; 13	SWE; 9	CZE; 10	BRA; 10				18th	30
1990	500cc	Cagiva	GP500	JPN; Ret	USA; 8	SPA; Ret	NAT; Ret	GER; 8	AUT; 11	YUG; Ret	NED; 10	BEL; 5	FRA; Ret	GBR; 11	SWE; 9	CZE; Ret	HUN; 9	AUS				12th	57
1991	500cc	Cagiva	GP500	JPN; 10	AUS; 8	USA; 6	SPA	ITA; 4	GER; DNS	AUT	EUR	NED; 7	FRA	GBR	RSM	CZE	VDM	MAL				13th	46
1992	500cc	Cagiva	GP500	JPN; 11	AUS; 12	MAL; Ret	SPA; 12	ITA; 5	EUR; 11	GER; 7	NED; 3	HUN; 9	FRA; DNS	GBR	BRA; 8	RSA; Ret						13th	29
1993	500cc	Lucky Strike Suzuki	RGV500	AUS; 5	MAL; 7	JPN; 6	SPA; Ret	AUT; 4	GER; Ret	NED; Ret	EUR; 5	RSM; 7	GBR; Ret	CZE; 10	ITA; 5	USA; 2	FIM; 1					6th	125
1994	500cc	Lucky Strike Suzuki	RGV500	AUS; 8	MAL; 7	JPN; 5	SPA; 4	AUT; 7	GER; 5	NED; 2	ITA; 7	FRA; 6	GBR; Ret	CZE; 8	USA; 8	ARG; 8	EUR; 6					8th	134
1995	500cc	Kanemoto Honda	NSR500	AUS; 6	MAL; 6	JPN; Ret	SPA; 5	GER; 7	ITA; 7	NED; 5	FRA; 5	GBR; Ret	CZE; 9	BRA; 8	ARG; 8	EUR; 6						7th	104
1996	500cc	Pileri Honda	NSR500	MAL; 2	INA; 2	JPN; Ret	SPA; 8	ITA; 6	FRA; 7	NED; 3	GER; 8	GBR; 7	AUT; 5	CZE; 9	IMO; 8	CAT; 8	BRA; 5	AUS; 4				4th	158
1997	500cc	Gresini Honda	NSR500V	MAL; 11	JPN; 10	SPA; 8	ITA; 6	AUT; 13	FRA; 6	NED; 6	IMO; 9	GER; 6	BRA; Ret	GBR; 3	CZE; 8	CAT; Ret	INA; Ret	AUS; 8				9th	101
1998	500cc	Gresini Honda	NSR500	JPN; 7	MAL; Ret	SPA; 5	ITA; 9	FRA; Ret	MAD; 9	NED; 4	GBR; 5	GER; 4	CZE; 3	IMO; 4	CAT; 7	AUS; 4	ARG; 3					5th	138
1999	500cc	MoviStar Pons Honda	NSR500	MAL; 6	JPN; 8	SPA; Ret	FRA; 10	ITA; Ret	CAT; Ret	NED; 10	GBR; 5	GER; 8	CZE; 7	IMO; 2	VAL; 10	AUS; Ret	RSA; 11	BRA; 4	ARG; 8			9th	110
2000	500cc	Emerson Honda Pons	NSR500	RSA; 4	MAL; 8	JPN; 7	SPA; 5	FRA; 5	**ITA**; Ret	**CAT**; Ret	NED; 1	**GBR**; 14	GER; 1	CZE; Ret	POR; 10	VAL; 5	BRA; 2	PAC; 7	AUS; 4			4th	163
2001	500cc	West Honda Pons	NSR500	JPN; 6	RSA; 9	SPA; 6	FRA; 8	ITA; 1	CAT; Ret	NED; 4	GBR; 3	GER; 5	CZE; 9	POR; Ret	VAL; 2	PAC; 2	AUS; 4	MAL; 7	BRA; 4			4th	182
2002	MotoGP	West Honda Pons	NSR500	JPN; 6	RSA; Ret	SPA; 5	FRA; 8	ITA; 5	CAT; 5	NED; 2	GBR; 3	GER; Ret	CZE; 9	POR; 5	BRA; 4							4th	204
2002	MotoGP	West Honda Pons	RC211V													PAC; 1	**MAL**; 3	AUS; 2	VAL; 1			4th	204
2003	MotoGP	Gauloises Yamaha Tech3	YZR-M1	JPN; 8	RSA; 5	SPA; 5	FRA; 3	ITA; Ret	CAT; 8	NED; 8	GBR; DNS	GER; Ret	CZE; 7	POR; 11	BRA; 12	PAC; 6	MAL; 15	AUS; Ret	VAL; 6			9th	101
2004	MotoGP	Repsol Honda	RC211V	RSA; 4	SPA; 3	FRA; 7	ITA; 6	CAT; Ret	NED; Ret	BRA; 5	GER; 2	GBR; 9	CZE; Ret	POR; 3	JPN; 4	QAT; 4	MAL; 3	AUS; 5	VAL; 6			4th	165
2005	MotoGP	Camel Pons Honda	RC211V	SPA; 4	**POR**; 1	CHN; 11	FRA; Ret	ITA; 7	CAT; 4	NED; 7	USA; Ret	GBR; 3	GER; 5	CZE; 4	JPN; Ret	MAL; 8	QAT; 9	AUS; Ret	TUR; 9	VAL; 5		8th	147
2007	MotoGP	Pramac d'Antin Ducati	GP7	QAT; 9	SPA; 11	TUR; 4	CHN; 14	FRA; Ret	ITA; 3	CAT; 8	GBR; 7	NED; 7	GER; Ret	USA; 9	CZE; 9	RSM; Ret	POR; Ret	JPN; 8	AUS; 5	MAL; 12	VAL; 7	10th	115

=== Suzuka 8 Hours results ===
Year	Team	Co-Rider	Bike	Pos
1999	(Japan) Lucky Strike Honda	(Japan) Tadayuki Okada	Honda RVF750 RC45	1st

=== Superbike World Championship ===
==== By season ====
Season	Motorcycle	Team	Race	Win	Podium	Pole	FLap	Pts	Plcd	WCh
2006	Honda CBR1000RR	Klaffi Honda	24	1	6	0	2	246	6th	–

==== Races by year ====
(key) (Races in bold indicate pole position; races in italics indicate fastest lap)

Year	Bike	1		2		3		4		5		6		7		8		9		10		11		12		Pos	Pts
Year	Bike	R1	R2	R1	R2	R1	R2	R1	R2	R1	R2	R1	R2	R1	R2	R1	R2	R1	R2	R1	R2	R1	R2	R1	R2	Pos	Pts
2006	Honda	QAT; 6	QAT; 7	AUS; 2	AUS; 3	SPA; 11	SPA; 14	ITA; 2	ITA; 4	EUR; 9	EUR; 5	SMR; 4	SMR; 2	CZE; Ret	CZE; 11	GBR; 8	GBR; 9	NED; Ret	NED; 7	GER; 5	GER; Ret	ITA; 1	ITA; 2	FRA; 7	FRA; 10	6th	246

Preceded by Tohru Ukawa; Shinichi Itoh	Suzuka 8 Hours Winner; 1999 (with Tadayuki Okada)	Succeeded by Tohru Ukawa; Daijiro Kato
