= 1993 British motorcycle Grand Prix =

(United Kingdom) 1993 British Grand Prix
Race details
- Race 10 of 14 races in the 1993 Grand Prix motorcycle racing season
- Date: 1 August 1993
- Official name: British Grand Prix
- Location: Donington Park
- Course: Permanent racing facility; 4.023 km (2.500 mi)

500cc
Pole position
- Rider: (United States) Kevin Schwantz
- Time: 1:33.514
Fastest lap
- Rider: (Italy) Luca Cadalora
- Time: 1:34.716
Podium
- First: (Italy) Luca Cadalora
- Second: (United States) Wayne Rainey
- Third: (United Kingdom) Niall Mackenzie

250cc
Pole position
- Rider: (Italy) Loris Capirossi
- Time: 1:35.191
Fastest lap
- Rider: (France) Jean-Philippe Ruggia
- Time: 1:34.888
Podium
- First: (France) Jean-Philippe Ruggia
- Second: (Italy) Loris Capirossi
- Third: (Italy) Loris Reggiani

125cc
Pole position
- Rider: (Japan) Kazuto Sakata
- Time: 1:41.178
Fastest lap
- Rider: (Japan) Kazuto Sakata
- Time: 1:41.347
Podium
- First: (Germany) Dirk Raudies
- Second: (Japan) Kazuto Sakata
- Third: (Germany) Ralf Waldmann

The 1993 British motorcycle Grand Prix was the tenth round of the 1993 Grand Prix motorcycle racing season. It took place on 1 August 1993 at Donington Park.

== 500 cc race report ==
This race was most notable for Luca Cadalora's shock first victory over Wayne Rainey at the near end of the race, the big accident that happened with Alex Barros, Mick Doohan and Kevin Schwantz on the opening lap and the close finish for third between Fogarty and Mackenzie.

Before the race, Wayne Rainey highsided in practice. This caused him to lose two fingernails, getting a fracture in his spine and a concussion as well.; Because of this, he is not able to qualify as good as he used to normally due to suffering from blurred vision, causing him to not be able to properly judge distance. In his biography 'His own story' he commented on this with the following words:

"I told the medical guys that my back was really sore, but I didn't say anything about my head. Back at the motorhome that night I found my vision was lagging. I knew I was concussed but the doctors hadn't checked, and I wanted nobody to know. Next morning I woke up and swung my head, and again my vision was behind the movement. I decided to do the morning warm-up to see how it would feel. I was two seconds off the pace, but I could choose my line. What concerned me more was I couldn't judge distance, so I couldn't pass anybody"

On Saturday, Kevin Schwantz took his sixth and final pole position of the year with a time of 1:33.514. Alongside him on the grid is Luca Cadalora in second place, then Mick Doohan in third and teammate Alex Barros in fourth. The second row of the grid consists of wildcard rider Carl Fogarty in fifth, Daryl Beattie in sixth, Àlex Crivillé in seventh and Wayne Rainey in a lowly eighth position, an impressive feat despite his problems at the time. Cagiva duo Doug Chandler and Matthew Mladin did not partake in the race.

All riders take off and do their usual warm-up lap before lining up in their respective grid slots. As the lights go out, Barros gets the best start and goes into the lead entering Redgate (Turn 1). Second is Rainey, who manages to pass many people on the outside and third is his teammate Cadalora who lost one position to his charging teammate. Fourth is Schwantz, fifth is Doohan and sixth is his teammate Beattie. Exiting Redgate, Rainey wastes no time and immediately passes Barros on the inside heading into Hollywood (Turn 2), Cadalora right behind him. At the entry of McLean's (Turn 7), Schwantz makes a lunge down Cadalora's inside and takes third from him. At Starkey's Straight, just as Doohan wants to make a move on teammate Barros for second, Doohan fails to brake in time and slams into the back of the Brazilian on his right. Both riders go down and Doohan falls onto the bike of Schwantz on the left, causing him to crash out in spectacular fashion as his bike somersaults out of contention and onto the American due to him braking for The Esses at that time. Three top riders are now eliminated from the race on the opening lap. The marshalls immediately rush out onto the track to help out the riders and recover the lost bike. Barros and Doohan - albeit limping - look to be unhurt, but Schwantz sits down and looks to be injured. The medical team runs to Schwantz to assist him.

Lap two and Rainey is now way out in front on his own. Second is Cadalora, third is wildcard rider and home hero Fogarty, fourth is Shinichi Ito, fifth is Crivillé and sixth is Renzo Colleoni. Fogarty is now pressuring Cadalora, as does Crivillé to Ito. The marshalls are busy pouring concrete dust on the track to clean up the oil that's present, then quickly get out of the way as the riders go down Starkey's Straight. At this straight, Fogarty goes side-by-side with Cadalora and outbreaks him entering The Esses, moving him up into second place. The crowd cheers loudly as he passes through the chicane.

Lap three and the top six is as follows: Rainey, Fogarty, Cadalora, Ito, Crivillé and Colleoni. Fogarty is now opening a gap to Cadalora and is trying to close down Rainey. Another rider has crashed out, this time being Jeremy McWilliams. Exiting the Melbourne Hairpin (Turn 10), Rainey has a moment but manages to stay on the bike.

On lap four, Beattie has caught and easily passed Colleoni for sixth place at the Wheatcroft Straight. Rainey is still out in front, the gap to Fogarty now stabilising in second. Third is Cadalora still as Ito is still being pressured by Crivillé.

Lap five and the top six is as follows: Rainey, Fogarty, Cadalora, Ito, Crivillé and Beattie. A displeased Barros has now arrived at the pits, talking to one of his crewmembers.

On lap six, a limping Doohan has also reached the pits, walking back to his garage. Fogarty is now coming under pressure from Cadalora, closing up at The Esses but not yet making a move.

Lap seven and Cadalora is now right at the back of Fogerty exiting Schwantz Curve (Turn 6). Exiting McLean's, Fogarty has to adjust his front brakes by hand, causing him to slow down enough for Cadalora to get by easily and snatch second from the Brit before Coppice (Turn 8)

On lap eight, Fogarty has a moment exiting the Craner Curves (Turn 3). Fogarty does his best to stay with Cadalora but is slowly increasing the gap to the British rider.

Lap nine and Cadalora is now slowly closing the gap to leader and teammate Rainey. Ito is now also closing in on Fogarty.

On lap ten, the top six is as follows: Rainey, Cadalora, Fogarty, Ito, Crivillé and Niall Mackenzie - who has passed Beattie for sixth. Crivillé has now fully caught up to Ito and tries a move on the Japanese entering Starkey's Bridge (Turn 5). Ito holds on entering Schwantz Curve, Crivillé still hot on his heels at McLean's. Entering Starkey's Straight, Ito has a look behind to see where Crivillé is. The Spaniard looks to be making a move but thinks better of it and stays behind for now. Mackenzie meanwhile has opened up a gap to Beattie.

Lap eleven and Crivillé again closes up at Starkey's Straight but does not make a move entering The Esses. No overtakes happened.

On lap twelve, Crivillé is all over the rear of Ito. He harasses him all throughout the lap but isn't able to get by, trying a move at Starkey's Straight but not able to get side-by-side with him.

Lap thirteen and Crivillé finally makes his move at the Wheatcroft Straight. He goes side-by-side with him, then executes the pass at the entry of Redgate. Behind Ito, Mackenzie is now gradually closing up on him as well.

On lap fourteen, Cadalora is still closing the gap to his Marlboro Team Roberts teammate Rainey. The top six is as follows: Rainey, Cadalora, Fogarty, Crivillé, Ito and Mackenzie.

Lap fifteen - the halfway point of the race - and everything is stable at the front. Cadalora is still closing in on Rainey.Mackenzie has also closed up to the back of Ito as well.

On lap sixteen, Cadalora has now fully caught up to the back of Rainey. Exiting the Melbourne Hairpin, Cadalora has a moment, giving Rainey some breathing room.

Lap seventeen and the duo now is coming up to a backmarker in the likes of Andrew Stroud. The top six is as follows: Rainey, Cadalora, Fogarty, Crivillé, Mackenzie - who has passed Ito - and Ito. The duo gets past Stroud without any problems. Cadalora is all over the back of Rainey but the Italian does not make a pass.

On lap eighteen, Mackenzie is closing up to Crivillé now. Cadalora is still behind, shadowing his teammate for the time being. The duo encounters another backmarker, this time being David Jefferies. He takes a very wide line at the Melbourne Hairpin, allowing the riders to easily pass him.

Lap nineteen and Cadalora is still right behind Rainey, stalking him al throughout the lap. Crivillé meanwhile has crashed out of the race from a strong fourth place. The marshalls recover his bike as the Marlboro Honda Pons rider is being escorted away by one of the medical staff from the crash site in disappointment.

On lap twenty, the top six is as follows: Rainey, Cadalora, Fogarty, Mackenzie, Ito and Beattie. The Scottish rider is now also flying, catching Fogarty in the process.

Lap twenty-one and the front is still stable: Rainey leads with teammate Cadalora in close second.

On lap twenty-two Rainey now opens up a small gap to Cadalora. Further behind, Mackenzie is still slowly closing the gap to third place Fogarty.

Lap twenty-three and Cadalora is still all over the rear of Rainey, not making a pass. The duo encounters three more backmarkers - Andreas Meklau, Bruno Bonhuil and Cees Doorakkers. Doorakkers lets them by before McLean's, with Bonhuil doing likewise at the short straight before Coppice. Meklau also lets them pass at Starkey's Straight before The Esses.

On lap twenty-four, Mackenzie is still slowly closing in on Fogarty. Cadalora is still all over the rear of Rainey but still not getting past.

Lap twenty-five and Rainey still leads, Cadalora still right behind him. No overtakes are made at the front.

On lap twenty-six, the top six is as follows: Rainey, Cadalora, Fogarty, Mackenzie, Ito and Beattie. By now, Mackenzie has fully caught up to the back of Fogarty, the duo now having to pass the backmarkers that Rainy and Cadalora have passed earlier.

Lap twenty-seven and Rainey has opened up a small gap to Rainey. He immediately closes this at the Old Hairpin but still refuses to make a pass.

On lap twenty-eight, Cadalora has a moment exiting the Old Hairpin and going into Starkey's Bridge. Exiting Coppice, it is then Rainey who has a moment but does not lose the position to Cadalora.

Lap twenty-nine, the penultimate lap, has started and the top six is as follows: Rainey, Cadalora, Fogarty, Mackenzie, Ito and Beattie. He looks to be making a move at the exit of the Old Hairpin on the outside but stays behind. However, entering Starkey's Bridge, Cadalora finally makes a move by going up the inside of Rainey and taking over the lead under loud cheering from presumably Schwantz fans. Exiting Coppice, he has opened up a small gap to Rainey, deciding to win the race and favouring his personal win over his teammate's championship hunt. Team manager Kenny Roberts shakes his head after the Italian pulled the move on Rainey.

As Cadalora crosses the line to start the final lap - lap thirty - the duo comes up to two more backmarkers, this time being Thierry Criné and Laurent Naveau. Criné blocks him a tiny but at the exit of the Old Hairpin, has a look and then notices Cadalora go past. Naveau also blocks the Italian at McLean's but eventually manages to get by without losing too much time. Cadalora has no more troubles, even looking behind him briefly at the straight before Goddards. He passes the last corner to cross the line with a wheelie and take a dominant win over his teammate in his rookie season - his first in the 500cc class - followed by Rainey in second position. It looks like Fogarty will take third place but exiting Goddards he runs out of fuel and slows down, allowing Mackenzie to pip him at the line and take third place away from him. Mackenzie finishes third, Fogarty fourth and Ito and Beattie finish in fifth and sixth place.

On the parade lap back to parc-fermé, Rainey congratulates Cadalora by shaking his hand whilst still on the bike. Mackenzie celebrates in his own style by taking the alternative flag of Scotland and waving it proudly, Fogarty talking to him as both have stopped on track. Both Cadalora and Rainey wave at the crowd, the Italian throwing both his arms up in the air to celebrate.

The trio goes up to the podium and discuss the race, an exhausted but happy Cadalora receiving his winners trophy. He lifts it up and covers his face with his hand, barely believing he has just won the race as the fans applaud and cheer. Rainey receives his trophy next, followed by Mackenzie whom the crowd ecstatically cheer on and clap for as a result. Cadalora then lifts his trophy up one more time before the Italian nation anthem starts to play for him. As it stops and the champagne is handed out, the riders spray it into the crowd and on each other afterwards.

Cadalora commented the following on his move:

"When I saw that Kevin was out and he didn't get point, I was thinking it was not big trouble, because 20 points more for Wayne. That's good."

Had Cadalora stayed in second, Rainey would be two points ahead of Schwantz and not three points behind him with four rounds to go. Rainey had this to say on his decision to race this day despite his problems:

""Being world champion was more important than anything. I couldn't live with myself giving it away. It was terribly dangerous. There was no way I should have been racing. And I knew it."

Team manager Kenny Roberts had the following to say about Cadalora's win:

"I'm very happy for Luca, because to win a 500 grand prix for Luca is fantastic. But, I have to run the Marlboro Yamaha team, and for the team, it would have been better that Wayne won. But, we have a lot of work to do before we win the world championship and I don't think this is going to make a big difference and Wayne is very happy for Luca as well."

== 500 cc classification ==
Pos	Rider	Team	Manufacturer	Time/Retired	Points
1	(Italy) Luca Cadalora	Marlboro Team Roberts	Yamaha	47:45.630	25
2	(United States) Wayne Rainey	Marlboro Team Roberts	Yamaha	+3.312	20
3	(United Kingdom) Niall Mackenzie	Valvoline Team WCM	ROC Yamaha	+21.898	16
4	(United Kingdom) Carl Fogarty	Cagiva Team Agostini	Cagiva	+22.238	13
5	(Japan) Shinichi Itoh	HRC Rothmans Honda	Honda	+36.151	11
6	(Australia) Daryl Beattie	Rothmans Honda Team	Honda	+36.394	10
7	(Spain) Juan Lopez Mella	Lopez Mella Racing Team	ROC Yamaha	+1:06.585	9
8	(Italy) Renzo Colleoni	Team Elit	ROC Yamaha	+1:10.731	8
9	(United Kingdom) John Reynolds	Padgett's Motorcycles	Harris Yamaha	+1:16.010	7
10	(Germany) Michael Rudroff	Rallye Sport	Harris Yamaha	+1:21.152	6
11	(United Kingdom) James Haydon	Team Great Britain	ROC Yamaha	+1:24.715	5
12	(France) José Kuhn	Euromoto	Yamaha	+1:33.544	4
13	(France) Bernard Garcia	Yamaha Motor France	Yamaha	+1:34.372	3
14	(United Kingdom) Ron Haslam	Team ROC	ROC Yamaha	+1:34.590	2
15	(Belgium) Laurent Naveau	Euro Team	ROC Yamaha	+1 Lap	1
16	(France) Thierry Crine	Ville de Paris	ROC Yamaha	+1 Lap	
17	(Austria) Andreas Meklau	Austrian Racing Company	ROC Yamaha	+1 Lap	
18	(France) Bruno Bonhuil	MTD Objectif 500	ROC Yamaha	+1 Lap	
19	(Netherlands) Cees Doorakkers	Doorakkers Racing	Harris Yamaha	+1 Lap	
20	(United Kingdom) David Jefferies	Peter Graves Racing Team	Harris Yamaha	+1 Lap	
Ret	(Switzerland) Serge David	Team ROC	ROC Yamaha	Retirement	
Ret	(United Kingdom) Kevin Mitchell	MBM Racing	Harris Yamaha	Retirement	
Ret	(Australia) Mick Doohan	Rothmans Honda Team	Honda	Retirement	
Ret	(New Zealand) Andrew Stroud	Team Harris	Harris Yamaha	Retirement	
Ret	(United States) Kevin Schwantz	Lucky Strike Suzuki	Suzuki	Retirement	
Ret	(Spain) Àlex Crivillé	Marlboro Honda Pons	Honda	Retirement	
Ret	(United Kingdom) Sean Emmett	Shell Team Harris	Harris Yamaha	Retirement	
Ret	(Italy) Lucio Pedercini	Team Pedercini	ROC Yamaha	Retirement	
Ret	(United Kingdom) Jeremy McWilliams	Millar Racing	Yamaha	Retirement	
Ret	(Brazil) Alex Barros	Lucky Strike Suzuki	Suzuki	Retirement	
DNS	(Australia) Matthew Mladin	Cagiva Team Agostini	Cagiva	Did not start	
DNS	(United States) Doug Chandler	Cagiva Team Agostini	Cagiva	Did not start	

== 250 cc classification ==
Pos	Rider	Manufacturer	Time/Retired	Points
1	(France) Jean-Philippe Ruggia	Aprilia	43:05.248	25
2	(Italy) Loris Capirossi	Honda	+3.266	20
3	(Italy) Loris Reggiani	Aprilia	+19.510	16
4	(Italy) Pierfrancesco Chili	Yamaha	+35.138	13
5	(Japan) Tadayuki Okada	Honda	+49.614	11
6	(Italy) Max Biaggi	Honda	+1:14.134	10
7	(Germany) Jochen Schmid	Yamaha	+1:14.948	9
8	(France) Jean-Michel Bayle	Aprilia	+1:15.847	8
9	(Netherlands) Patrick van den Goorbergh	Aprilia	+1:16.072	7
10	(Switzerland) Eskil Suter	Aprilia	+1:16.328	6
11	(Netherlands) Wilco Zeelenberg	Aprilia	+1:21.140	5
12	(France) Frédéric Protat	Aprilia	+1:21.534	4
13	(Italy) Paolo Casoli	Gilera	+1:27.766	3
14	(Switzerland) Adrian Bosshard	Honda	+1:32.974	2
15	(Switzerland) Bernard Haenggeli	Aprilia	+1:35.370	1
16	(Italy) Alessandro Gramigni	Gilera	+1:35.902	
17	(Germany) Bernd Kassner	Aprilia	+1 Lap	
18	(Spain) Juan Borja	Honda	+1 Lap	
19	(United Kingdom) Nigel Bosworth	Yamaha	+1 Lap	
20	(France) Jean-Pierre Jeandat	Aprilia	+1 Lap	
21	(Germany) Volker Bähr	Honda	+1 Lap	
22	(Netherlands) Jurgen van den Goorbergh	Aprilia	+1 Lap	
23	(Spain) Luis Maurel	Aprilia	+1 Lap	
24	(Italy) Massimo Pennacchioli	Honda	+1 Lap	
25	(Spain) Carlos Checa	Honda	+5 Laps	
Ret	(Spain) Alberto Puig	Honda	Retirement	
Ret	(United Kingdom) Paul Brown	Honda	Retirement	
Ret	(New Zealand) Simon Crafar	Suzuki	Retirement	
Ret	(Japan) Nobuatsu Aoki	Honda	Retirement	
Ret	(Austria) Andreas Preining	Aprilia	Retirement	
Ret	(Spain) Luis d'Antin	Honda	Retirement	
Ret	(Spain) Pere Riba	Honda	Retirement	
Ret	(Germany) Helmut Bradl	Honda	Retirement	
Ret	(Japan) Tetsuya Harada	Yamaha	Retirement	

Previous race: 1993 San Marino Grand Prix	FIM Grand Prix World Championship; 1993 season	Next race: 1993 Czech Republic Grand Prix
Previous race: 1992 British Grand Prix	British Grand Prix	Next race: 1994 British Grand Prix
