= Luca Cadalora =

Italian motorcycle racer

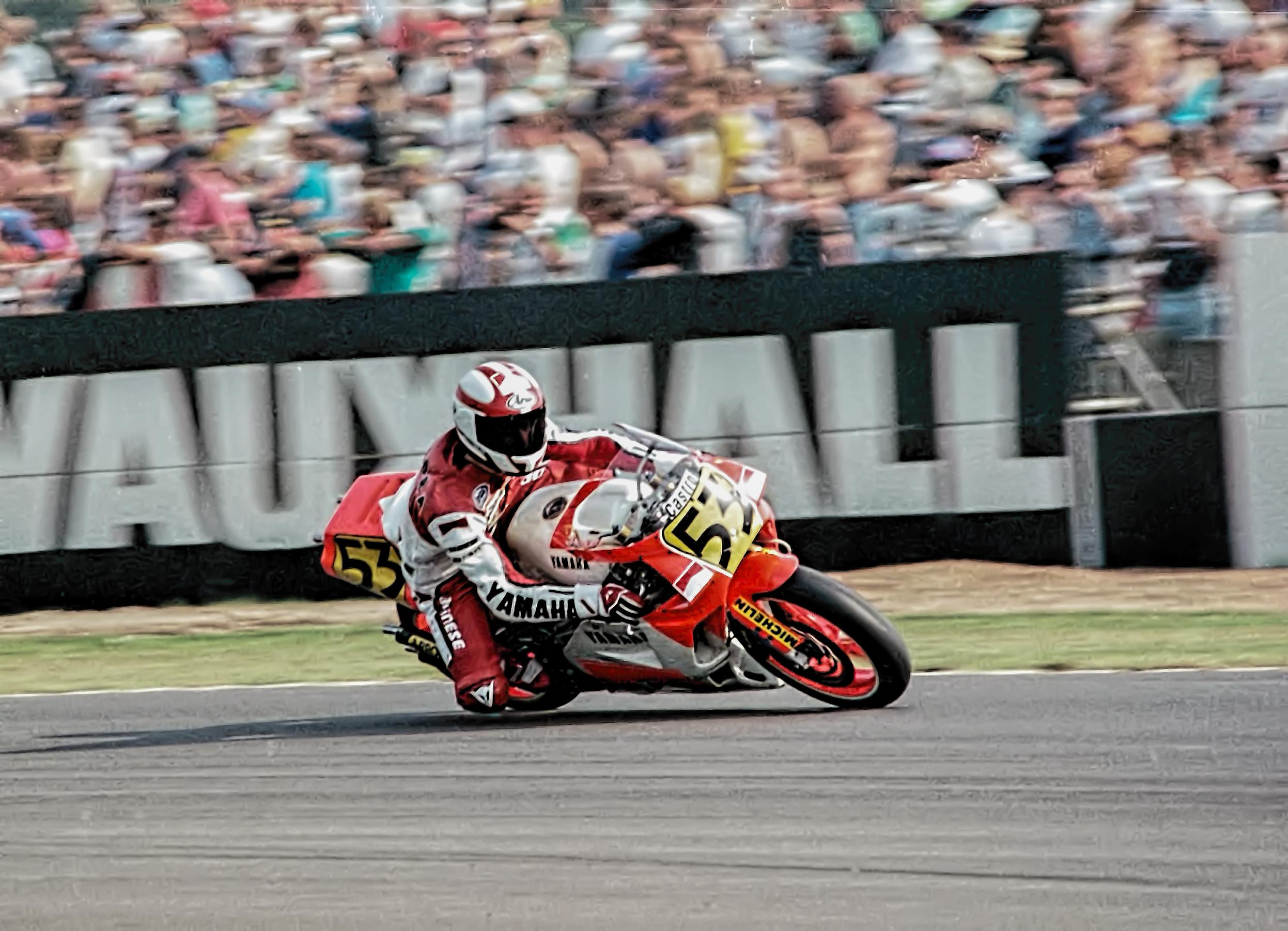
- Luca Cadalora, riding his Yamaha YZR500 at the 1989 British Grand Prix
- Nationality: Italian
- Born: 17 May 1963 (age 63); Modena, Italy
Motorcycle racing career statistics
Grand Prix motorcycle racing
Active years	1984 - 2000
First race	1984 125cc Nations Grand Prix
Last race	2000 500cc Czech Grand Prix
First win	1986 125cc West German Grand Prix
Last win	1996 500cc German Grand Prix
Team(s)	MBA, Garelli, Yamaha, Honda, MuZ, Modenas
Championships	125cc – 1986; 250cc – 1991, 1992
Starts / Wins / Podiums / Poles / F. laps / Points; 195 / 34 / 72 / 29 / 30 / 1932

Luca Cadalora (born 17 May 1963) is an Italian former professional motorcycle racer who is the 1988 Italian 250 cc Champion, 1986 125 cc World Champion, 1991 and 1992 250 cc World Champion and eight-time Premier Class race winner. He competed in Grand Prix motorcycle racing from 1984 to 2000.

== Racing career ==
Born in Modena, Emilia Romagna, Cadalora began his professional motorcycle racing career in 1984, riding an MBA in the 125cc world championship. In 1986, he won the 125cc World Championship while riding for the Garelli factory racing team. His success earned him a promotion to the 250cc class with Giacomo Agostini's Marlboro Yamaha factory racing team in 1986. In 1991, Cadalora switched to the Rothmans Honda factory racing team and won the 250cc World Championship aboard an Erv Kanemoto-tuned Honda NSR250. He successfully defended his title with Honda in 1992, claiming his third world championship.

In 1993, Cadalora rose to the premier 500cc division as Wayne Rainey's teammate in the Kenny Roberts-Yamaha team. In three seasons on the Roberts Yamaha, he displayed flashes of brilliance, finishing as high as second to Mick Doohan in 1994. Cadalora rejoined Kanemoto for the 1996 season racing a Honda NSR500. Despite lacking any major sponsors, he still managed to finish the season in third place aboard the Kanemoto-Honda.

For the 1997 season, Cadalora got a contract as official Yamaha rider in the new Promotor Racing team backed by an Austrian businessman. However, after few races the team failed due to financial problems. WCM rescued the team with the help of a Red Bull sponsorship and Cadalora ended the season in sixth place. At the beginning of the 1998 season, WCM and Cadalora lost Yamaha official support. He returned to the Rainey-Yamaha works team for a few races to replace an injured Jean-Michel Bayle, then helped develop the new MuZ race bike. In 1999, he was again with MuZ. Cadalora finished his career with Kenny Roberts' Modenas team in 2000.

Cadalora retired with 34 Grand Prix victories in three different classes.

== Career statistics ==
=== Grand Prix motorcycle racing ===
==== By class ====
Class	Season	1st GP	1st Pod	1st Win	Race	Win	Podiums	Pole	FLap	Pts	WChmp
125cc	1984–1986	1984 Nations	1984 Germany	1986 Germany	25	4	9	6	5	153	1
250cc	1987–1992	1987 Japan	1987 Spain	1988 Germany	87	22	39	15	19	950	2
500cc	1989, 1993–2000	1989 Great Britain	1993 Great Britain	1993 Great Britain	83	8	24	8	6	827	0
Total	1984–2000				**195**	**34**	**72**	**29**	**30**	**1930**	**3**

==== Races by year ====
(key) (Races in bold indicate pole position) (Races in italics indicate fastest lap)

Year	Class	Bike	1	2	3	4	5	6	7	8	9	10	11	12	13	14	15	16	Pos.	Pts
1984	125cc	MBA	NAT; 5	SPA; Ret	GER; 2	FRA; 12	NED; Ret	GBR; 6	SWE; Ret	RSM; 7									8th	27
1985	125cc	MBA	**SPA**; Ret	GER; Ret	NAT; Ret	AUT; 30	NED; 7	BEL; DNS	FRA	GBR; 11	SWE; DNS	RSM							17th	4
1986	125cc	Garelli	SPA; 4	NAT; 4	**GER**; 1	**AUT**; 1	**NED**; 1	**BEL**; Ret	**FRA**; 1	GBR; 3	SWE; 2	RSM; 2	BWU; 2						1st	122
1987	250cc	Yamaha	JPN; 13	**SPA**; 2	GER; 5	NAT; 11	AUT; Ret	YUG; DNS	NED; 15	FRA; 15	GBR; Ret	**SWE**; 2	CZE; 5	**RSM**; 2	POR; 9	BRA; 6	ARG; 4		7th	63
1988	250cc	Yamaha	JPN; Ret	USA; 6	SPA; 7	EXP; Ret	NAT; 5	GER; 1	AUT; 7	NED; 4	BEL; 8	YUG; 5	FRA; 6	GBR; 1	**SWE**; Ret	CZE; 3	BRA; Ret		6th	136
1989	250cc	Yamaha	JPN; 3	AUS; 3	USA; 3	**SPA**; 1	**NAT**; Ret	GER; 11	AUT; Ret	YUG; Ret	NED; Ret	BEL; 5	FRA; 11	**GBR**; Ret	SWE; 5	CZE; 6	BRA; 1		5th	127
1989	500cc	Yamaha	JPN	AUS	USA	SPA	NAT	GER	AUT	YUG	NED	BEL	FRA	GBR; 8	SWE; DNS	CZE	BRA		27th	8
1990	250cc	Yamaha	JPN; 1	**USA**; 2	SPA; 2	NAT; Ret	**GER**; 10	AUT; 1	YUG; 4	NED; Ret	BEL; Ret	FRA; 2	GBR; 1	SWE; 4	CZE; 4	HUN; 4	AUS; 3		3rd	184
1991	250cc	Honda	JPN; 1	**AUS**; 1	**USA**; 1	SPA; 2	ITA; 1	GER; 4	AUT; 5	**EUR**; 1	NED; 2	FRA; 5	GBR; 1	RSM; 1	CZE; 3	**VDM**; 3	MAL; 1		1st	237
1992	250cc	Honda	JPN; 1	AUS; 1	MAL; 1	**SPA**; 4	ITA; 1	EUR; 1	GER; 4	NED; 2	**HUN**; 1	FRA; 3	GBR; 4	BRA; 1	RSA; 6				1st	203
1993	500cc	Yamaha	AUS; 8	MAL; DNS	JPN; Ret	SPA; 5	AUT; 5	GER; 8	NED; 7	EUR; 15	RSM; 5	GBR; 1	CZE; 2	**ITA**; 1	USA; 3	FIM; Ret			5th	145
1994	500cc	Yamaha	AUS; 2	MAL; 4	**JPN**; 4	SPA; Ret	AUT; 22	GER; DNS	NED; 9	**ITA**; 2	FRA; 7	GBR; 3	**CZE**; 3	USA; 1	ARG; 6	**EUR**; 1			2nd	174
1995	500cc	Yamaha	AUS; 4	MAL; Ret	JPN; 4	SPA; 2	GER; 2	ITA; 12	NED; 7	FRA; 2	GBR; 5	**CZE**; 1	BRA; 1	**ARG**; 3	**EUR**; Ret				3rd	176
1996	500cc	Honda	MAL; 1	INA; 6	JPN; Ret	SPA; 2	ITA; 3	FRA; 6	NED; Ret	GER; 1	GBR; 9	AUT; 4	CZE; Ret	IMO; 6	CAT; 4	BRA; 6	AUS; 7		3rd	168
1997	500cc	Yamaha	MAL; 4	JPN; 11	SPA; 11	ITA; 2	AUT; 3	FRA; Ret	NED; Ret	IMO; 6	GER; Ret	BRA; 3	GBR; 5	CZE; 2	CAT; 4	INA; Ret	AUS; Ret		6th	129
1998	500cc	Yamaha	JPN	MAL	SPA	ITA	FRA; 6	MAD; Ret											22nd	10
1998	500cc	Suzuki							NED; Ret	GBR	GER	CZE	IMO	CAT	AUS				22nd	10
1998	500cc	MuZ														ARG; Ret			22nd	10
1999	500cc	MuZ Weber	MAL; Ret	JPN	SPA; 8	FRA; Ret	ITA; 10	CAT; Ret	NED; Ret	GBR	GER; Ret	CZE; DNS	IMO	VAL	AUS	RSA	BRA	ARG	20th	14
2000	500cc	Modenas	RSA	MAL	JPN	SPA	FRA	ITA	CAT	NED	GBR	GER; 14	CZE; 15	POR	VAL	BRA	PAC	AUS	27th	3

=== Superbike World Championship ===
==== Races by year ====
(key) (Races in bold indicate pole position) (Races in italics indicate fastest lap)

Year	Make	1		2		3		4		5		6		7		8		9		10		11		12		13		Pos.	Pts
Year	Make	R1	R2	R1	R2	R1	R2	R1	R2	R1	R2	R1	R2	R1	R2	R1	R2	R1	R2	R1	R2	R1	R2	R1	R2	R1	R2	Pos.	Pts
2000	Ducati	RSA	RSA	AUS	AUS	JPN	JPN	GBR; Ret	GBR; 17	ITA	ITA	GER	GER	SMR	SMR	SPA	SPA	USA	USA	EUR	EUR	NED	NED	GER	GER	GBR	GBR	NC	0
