= 1993 Czech Republic motorcycle Grand Prix =

1993 Czech Republic Grand Prix
Race details
- Race 11 of 14 races in the 1993 Grand Prix motorcycle racing season
- Date: 22 August 1993
- Official name: Grand Prix České republiky
- Location: Brno Circuit
- Course: Permanent racing facility; 5.403 km (3.357 mi)

500cc
Pole position
- Rider: (United States) Wayne Rainey
- Time: 2:02.448
Fastest lap
- Rider: (United States) Wayne Rainey
- Time: 2:03.154
Podium
- First: (United States) Wayne Rainey
- Second: (Italy) Luca Cadalora
- Third: (Australia) Mick Doohan

250cc
Pole position
- Rider: (Italy) Loris Capirossi
- Time: 2:05.008
Fastest lap
- Rider: (Italy) Loris Capirossi
- Time: 2:05.681
Podium
- First: (Italy) Loris Reggiani
- Second: (Italy) Max Biaggi
- Third: (Spain) Alberto Puig

125cc
Pole position
- Rider: (Japan) Kazuto Sakata
- Time: 2:12.540
Fastest lap
- Rider: (Japan) Kazuto Sakata
- Time: 2:13.164
Podium
- First: (Japan) Kazuto Sakata
- Second: (Germany) Dirk Raudies
- Third: (Japan) Takeshi Tsujimura

The 1993 Czech Republic motorcycle Grand Prix was the eleventh round of the 1993 Grand Prix motorcycle racing season. It took place on 22 August 1993 at the Masaryk Circuit located in Brno, Czech Republic.

== 500 cc race report ==
John Kocinski is given a Cagiva to ride after impressing them during testing.

Kevin Schwantz needs to do well, and very disappointingly, qualifies in the 2nd row. Kenny Roberts looks happy that Rainey qualifies in 1st, his first pole since 1991. Kocinski gives Cagiva one of their best qualifyings with 3rd on the grid.

Kocinski jump-starts but stops it immediately before the green light. Luca Cadalora gets the start from Rainey, Kocinski and Mick Doohan.

Rainey takes the front from Cadalora, Doohan, Kocinski, Shinichi Itoh and Daryl Beattie.

Team Roberts has found a good setting, because Rainey and Cadalora immediately open a gap.

Niall Mackenzie lowsides out.

Schwantz is struggling around 5th. He later admits that he tore some muscles in his shoulder in the Donington crash, and that it interfered with his riding.

Team orders don’t need to be remembered, because Rainey has disappeared into the distance. With 3 rounds left, Rainey has an 11-point lead on Schwantz.

== 500 cc classification ==
Pos	Rider	Team	Manufacturer	Time/Retired	Points
1	(United States) Wayne Rainey	Marlboro Team Roberts	Yamaha	45:39.002	25
2	(Italy) Luca Cadalora	Marlboro Team Roberts	Yamaha	+7.770	20
3	(Australia) Mick Doohan	Rothmans Honda Team	Honda	+10.790	16
4	(United States) John Kocinski	Cagiva Team Agostini	Cagiva	+13.094	13
5	(United States) Kevin Schwantz	Lucky Strike Suzuki	Suzuki	+27.090	11
6	(Australia) Daryl Beattie	Rothmans Honda Team	Honda	+27.276	10
7	(Japan) Shinichi Itoh	HRC Rothmans Honda	Honda	+39.716	9
8	(Spain) Àlex Crivillé	Marlboro Honda Pons	Honda	+44.818	8
9	(United States) Doug Chandler	Cagiva Team Agostini	Cagiva	+55.844	7
10	(Brazil) Alex Barros	Lucky Strike Suzuki	Suzuki	+1:01.696	6
11	(France) Bernard Garcia	Yamaha Motor France	Yamaha	+1:20.048	5
12	(United Kingdom) John Reynolds	Padgett's Motorcycles	Harris Yamaha	+1:21.726	4
13	(Germany) Michael Rudroff	Rallye Sport	Harris Yamaha	+1:21.904	3
14	(Spain) Juan Lopez Mella	Lopez Mella Racing Team	ROC Yamaha	+1:29.597	2
15	(France) José Kuhn	Euromoto	Yamaha	+1:30.107	1
16	(United Kingdom) Jeremy McWilliams	Millar Racing	Yamaha	+1:30.262	
17	(Italy) Renato Colleoni	Team Elit	ROC Yamaha	+1:57.096	
18	(Austria) Andreas Meklau	Austrian Racing Company	ROC Yamaha	+1 Lap	
19	(United Kingdom) David Jefferies	Peter Graves Racing Team	Harris Yamaha	+1 Lap	
20	(Italy) Lucio Pedercini	Team Pedercini	ROC Yamaha	+1 Lap	
21	(Italy) Marco Papa	Librenti Corse	Harris Yamaha	+1 Lap	
22	(France) Bruno Bonhuil	MTD Objectif 500	ROC Yamaha	+1 Lap	
Ret	(France) Thierry Crine	Ville de Paris	ROC Yamaha	Retirement	
Ret	(United Kingdom) Niall Mackenzie	Valvoline Team WCM	ROC Yamaha	Retirement	
Ret	(New Zealand) Andrew Stroud	Team Harris	Harris Yamaha	Retirement	
Ret	(United States) Freddie Spencer	Yamaha Motor France	Yamaha	Retirement	
Ret	(United Kingdom) Sean Emmett	Shell Team Harris	Harris Yamaha	Retirement	
Ret	(United Kingdom) Kevin Mitchell	MBM Racing	Harris Yamaha	Retirement	
Ret	(Netherlands) Cees Doorakkers	Doorakkers Racing	Harris Yamaha	Retirement	
Ret	(Belgium) Laurent Naveau	Euro Team	ROC Yamaha	Retirement	
Ret	(Switzerland) Serge David	Team ROC	ROC Yamaha	Retirement	
DNS	(Australia) Matthew Mladin	Cagiva Team Agostini	Cagiva	Did not start	
DNS	(Japan) Tsutomu Udagawa	Team Udagawa	ROC Yamaha	Did not start	

== 250 cc classification ==
Pos	Rider	Manufacturer	Time/Retired	Points
1	(Italy) Loris Reggiani	Aprilia	42:28.194	25
2	(Italy) Max Biaggi	Honda	+0.979	20
3	(Spain) Alberto Puig	Honda	+1.328	16
4	(Italy) Doriano Romboni	Honda	+1.366	13
5	(Italy) Loris Capirossi	Honda	+9.774	11
6	(Japan) Tetsuya Harada	Yamaha	+10.142	10
7	(Germany) Helmut Bradl	Honda	+10.528	9
8	(Italy) Pierfrancesco Chili	Yamaha	+10.792	8
9	(Germany) Jochen Schmid	Yamaha	+12.566	7
10	(Japan) Nobuatsu Aoki	Honda	+26.674	6
11	(Japan) Tadayuki Okada	Honda	+31.509	5
12	(Netherlands) Wilco Zeelenberg	Aprilia	+31.710	4
13	(New Zealand) Simon Crafar	Suzuki	+43.828	3
14	(Netherlands) Patrick van den Goorbergh	Aprilia	+59.628	2
15	(France) Frédéric Protat	Aprilia	+1:00.071	1
16	(Spain) Luis Maurel	Aprilia	+1:00.160	
17	(Switzerland) Adrian Bosshard	Honda	+1:00.211	
18	(Netherlands) Jurgen van den Goorbergh	Aprilia	+1:00.753	
19	(Switzerland) Bernard Haenggeli	Aprilia	+1:00.872	
20	(Spain) Pere Riba	Honda	+1:46.858	
21	(Germany) Volker Bähr	Honda	+1:46.946	
22	(Italy) Massimo Pennacchioli	Honda	+1 Lap	
Ret	(Switzerland) Eskil Suter	Aprilia	Retirement	
Ret	(Spain) Carlos Checa	Honda	Retirement	
Ret	(Spain) Luis d'Antin	Honda	Retirement	
Ret	(France) Jean-Michel Bayle	Aprilia	Retirement	
Ret	(Germany) Bernd Kassner	Aprilia	Retirement	
Ret	(France) Jean-Philippe Ruggia	Aprilia	Retirement	
Ret	(Czech Republic) Bohumil Staša Jr.	Aprilia	Retirement	
Ret	(Austria) Andreas Preining	Aprilia	Retirement	
Ret	(Czech Republic) Marek Morávek	Yamaha	Retirement	
Ret	(Spain) Juan Borja	Honda	Retirement	

Previous race: 1993 British Grand Prix	FIM Grand Prix World Championship; 1993 season	Next race: 1993 Italian Grand Prix
Previous race: 1991 Czechoslovak Grand Prix	Czech Republic Grand Prix	Next race: 1994 Czech Republic Grand Prix
