= Kevin Schwantz =

American motorcycle racer (born 1964)

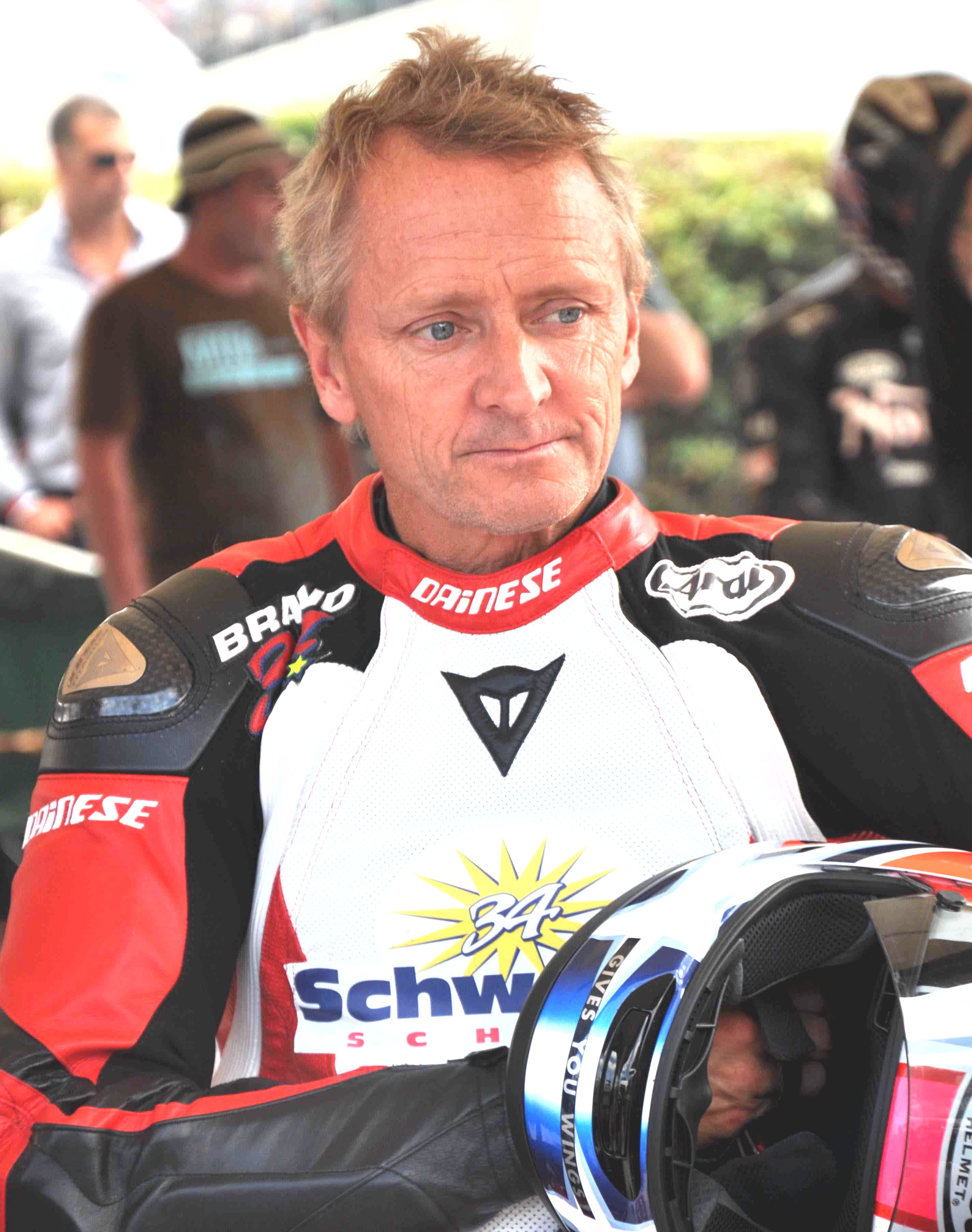
- Schwantz at a demonstration event in 2010
- Born: June 19, 1964 (age 62); Houston, Texas, U.S.
- Bike number: 34 (retired in honor)
- Website: Kevin Schwantz
Motorcycle racing career statistics
Grand Prix motorcycle racing
Active years	1986–1995
First race	1986 500cc Dutch TT
Last race	1995 500cc Japanese Grand Prix
First win	1988 500cc Japanese Grand Prix
Last win	1994 500cc British Grand Prix
Team	Suzuki
Championships	500cc - 1993
Starts / Wins / Podiums / Poles / F. laps / Points; 105 / 25 / 51 / 29 / 26 / 1236.5

NASCAR O'Reilly Auto Parts Series career
- 18 races run over 3 years
- Best finish: 50th (1998)
- First race: 1997 All Pro Bumper to Bumper 300 (Charlotte)
- Last race: 1999 MBNA Gold 200 (Dover)
Wins	Top tens	Poles
0	2	0

Kevin James Schwantz (born June 19, 1964) is an American former professional motorcycle road racer. He competed in the FIM Grand Prix motorcycle racing world championships from 1988 to 1995, most prominently as a member of the Suzuki factory racing team where he won the 1993 world championship.

== Early life ==
Schwantz, whose parents owned a motorcycle shop, learned to ride at the age of four. He began his competitive career as a trials rider, following his father and Uncle, Darryl Hurst (the original 34), in that sport. From trials, he progressed to motocross in his teens, becoming a top regional MX racer. After a serious crash in qualifying for the Houston Supercross in 1983, he decided to quit motocross.

== Career ==
At the end of the 1984 season, Schwantz was offered a test ride with the Yoshimura Suzuki Superbike team, who promptly signed the Texan to a contract. In his first race for Yoshimura, he won both legs of the 1985 Willow Springs AMA Superbike National. He finished seventh overall in the championship despite only competing in half the races. He finished second to Eddie Lawson in the 1986 Daytona 200 on the new Suzuki GSX-R750. Then, in what would become an all too common occurrence throughout his career, he broke his collarbone in a qualifying crash and missed several races. Once again he finished seventh overall in the Championship.

The 1987 Superbike National Championship marked the beginning of Schwantz' fiercely competitive rivalry with Wayne Rainey. The two battled throughout the entire season, often coming into contact on the track. Rainey eventually won the National Championship but Schwantz closed the season winning five out of six races. So intense was their rivalry that they continued their battle during the 1987 Transatlantic Trophy match races in which they were supposedly teammates competing against a team of British riders.

Schwantz began 1988 by winning the season-opening Daytona 200 in what would be his only win in that prestigious event. He then departed for Europe as Suzuki promoted him to its 500cc Grand Prix team where he made an immediate impact by winning the 1988 Japanese Grand Prix in the opening round at Suzuka, Japan; it was only his seventh Grand Prix ride in total, having experienced wild card rides in 1986 on the old square four RG500 and in 1987 on the first version of the V4 RGV500.

Schwantz's archrival, Rainey joined the Grand Prix circuit, signing for the Team Roberts-Yamaha squad. For the next six years, the two continued their intense rivalry on race tracks all across Europe.

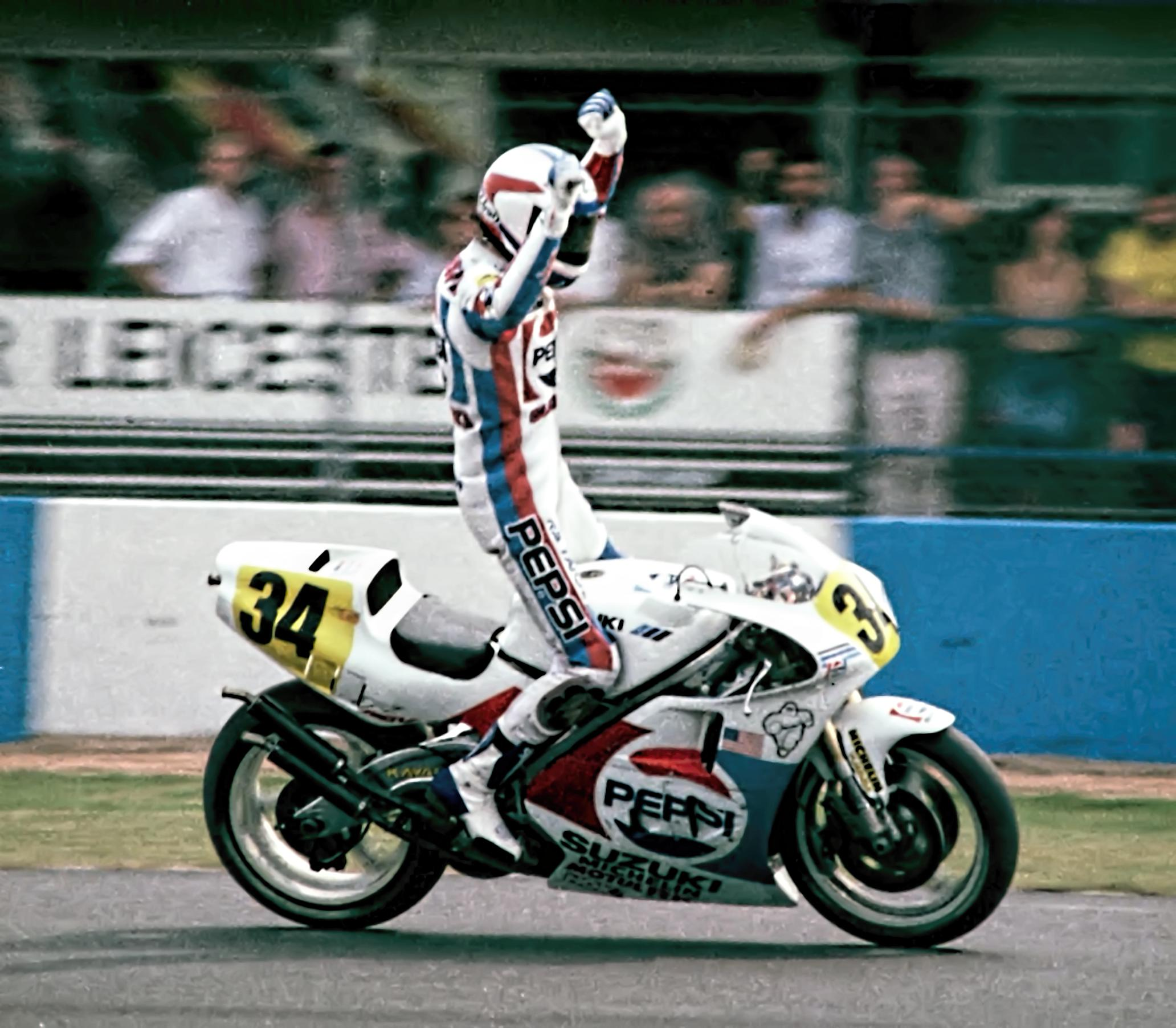
Schwantz cheering after winning the 1989 British Grand Prix at Donington Park.

The late 1980s and early 1990s are remembered as one of the most competitive eras of Grand Prix racing with a field rich in talent that included Rainey, Wayne Gardner, Mick Doohan, Eddie Lawson and Randy Mamola. He was often at a disadvantage in that his Suzukis never seemed to be as fast as those of his Yamaha and Honda mounted rivals. His determination to win at all cost meant that he seemed to crash as often as he won. This trait made him a popular favorite among race fans the world over. His last lap pass of Rainey to win the 1991 German Grand Prix at the Hockenheimring, with his rear tire fish-tailing on the verge of control, typified Schwantz' "do or die" riding style.

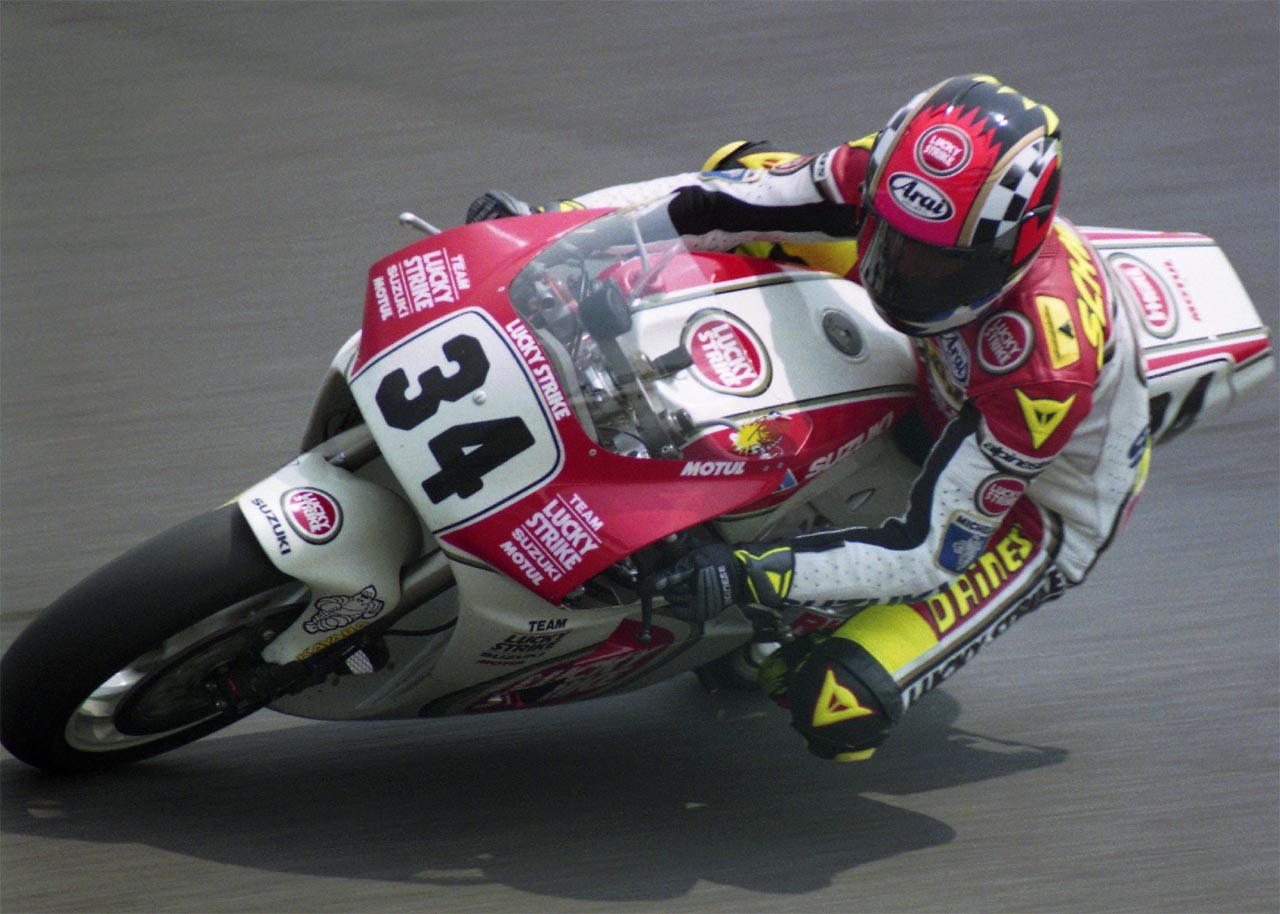
Schwantz on the Suzuki RGV500 in 1993

Schwantz culminated his career in 1993 by winning his only 500cc World Championship. After suffering through a crash-infested 1994 season, the injuries he had incurred over the years began to take their toll on him, as did the career ending injuries suffered by his rival Rainey, at the 1993 Italian Grand Prix that left him paralyzed from the chest down. Early in the 1995 season, after a conversation with Rainey, Schwantz decided to retire from motorcycle competition. Schwantz had accumulated 25 Grands Prix wins during his career, one more than his great rival, Wayne Rainey. This made him the second most successful American roadracer behind Eddie Lawson. In a display of respect, the FIM retired his racing number (34) as a testament to his popularity.

In the late 1990s, Schwantz ran a couple of seasons of the Australian NASCAR Championship before returning home to the United States where he competed in the NASCAR Busch Series, running 18 races with two top-tens, an ARCA Bondo/Mar-Hyde Series event, and touring car races. Schwantz was inducted into the AMA Motorcycle Hall of Fame in 1999. The FIM named him a Grand Prix "Legend" in 2000.

Schwantz co-designed the Circuit of the Americas racetrack with Tavo Hellmund and German architect and circuit designer Hermann Tilke.

Schwantz has operated a riding school since circa 2001 in Birmingham, Alabama.

In 2005, Schwantz drove a superkart at Laguna Seca, which he felt "was a lot more fun than riding a bike around here".

== Other appearances ==
In 2003, Schwantz was featured in the motorcycle racing documentary film Faster.

In 2011, Schwantz rode Marco Simoncelli's bike in his honor in Valencia, Spain.

In 2017, Schwantz made a guest appearance on Jay Leno's Garage (Season 3, Episode 10).

== Awards ==
Schwantz was inducted into the Motorsports Hall of Fame of America in 2019.

== Career statistics ==
=== Grand Prix motorcycle racing ===
Points system from 1968 to 1987

**Position**	1	2	3	4	5	6	7	8	9	10
**Points**	15	12	10	8	6	5	4	3	2	1

Points system from 1988 to 1992

**Position**	1	2	3	4	5	6	7	8	9	10	11	12	13	14	15
**Points**	20	17	15	13	11	10	9	8	7	6	5	4	3	2	1

Points system from 1993 onwards.

**Position**	1	2	3	4	5	6	7	8	9	10	11	12	13	14	15
**Points**	25	20	16	13	11	10	9	8	7	6	5	4	3	2	1

==== By season ====
Season	Class	Motorcycle	Team	Number	Race	Win	Podium	Pole	FLap	Pts	Plcd	WCh
1986	500cc	Suzuki RG500	Rizla Suzuki	32	4	0	0	0	0	2	22nd	–
1987	500cc	Suzuki RGV500	Heron Suzuki	34	3	0	0	0	0	11	16th	–
1988	500cc	Suzuki RGV500	Pepsi Suzuki	34	14	2	4	0	2	119	8th	–
1989	500cc	Suzuki RGV500	Pepsi Suzuki	34	15	6	9	9	8	162.5	4th	–
1990	500cc	Suzuki RGV500	Lucky Strike Suzuki	34	15	5	10	7	6	188	**2nd**	–
1991	500cc	Suzuki RGV500	Lucky Strike Suzuki	34	14	5	8	5	4	204	**3rd**	–
1992	500cc	Suzuki RGV500	Lucky Strike Suzuki	34	12	1	3	1	1	99	4th	–
1993	500cc	Suzuki RGV500	Lucky Strike Suzuki	34	14	4	11	6	2	248	**1st**	1
1994	500cc	Suzuki RGV500	Lucky Strike Suzuki	1	11	2	6	1	3	169	4th	–
1995	500cc	Suzuki RGV500	Lucky Strike Suzuki	34	3	0	0	0	0	34	15th	–
Total					**105**	**25**	**51**	**29**	**26**	**1236.5**		**1**

==== By class ====
Class	Seasons	1st GP	1st Pod	1st Win	Race	Win	Podiums	Pole	FLap	Pts	WChmp
500cc	1986–1995	1986 Nederlands	1988 Japan	1988 Japan	105	25	51	29	26	1236.5	1
Total	1986–1995				**105**	**25**	**51**	**29**	**26**	**1236.5**	**1**

==== Races by year ====
(key) (Races in bold indicate pole position, races in italics indicate fastest lap)

Year	Class	Bike	1	2	3	4	5	6	7	8	9	10	11	12	13	14	15	Pos	Pts
1986	500cc	Suzuki	ESP	NAT	GER	AUT	YUG	NED; Ret	BEL; 10	FRA; Ret	GBR	SWE	RSM; 10					22nd	2
1987	500cc	Suzuki	JPN	ESP; 5	GER	NAT; 8	AUT	YUG	NED	FRA; 9	GBR	SWE	CZE	RSM	POR	BRA	ARG	16th	11
1988	500cc	Suzuki	JPN; 1	USA; 5	ESP; Ret	EXP; Ret	NAT; 4	GER; 1	AUT; 4	NED; 8	BEL; Ret	YUG	FRA; 3	GBR; Ret	SWE; 12	CZE; Ret	BRA; 3	8th	119
1989	500cc	Suzuki	JPN; 1	**AUS**; Ret	USA; 2	ESP; Ret	**NAT**; Ret	**GER**; Ret	**AUT**; 1	**YUG**; 1	**NED**; Ret	**BEL**; 2	FRA; 2	**GBR**; 1	SWE; Ret	**CZE**; 1	BRA; 1	4th	162.5
1990	500cc	Suzuki	JPN; 3	USA; Ret	ESP; 3	NAT; 2	**GER**; 1	**AUT**; 1	YUG; 2	**NED**; 1	**BEL**; 7	**FRA**; 1	GBR; 1	**SWE**; Ret	**CZE**; Ret	HUN; 3	AUS; Ret	**2nd**	**188**
1991	500cc	Suzuki	**JPN**; 1	AUS; 5	USA; 3	ESP; Ret	ITA; 7	GER; 1	AUT; 3	**EUR**; 4	**NED**; 1	FRA; 4	**GBR**; 1	**RSM**; 2	CZE; 5	VDM; 1	MAL; DNS	**3rd**	**204**
1992	500cc	Suzuki	**JPN**; 3	AUS; 4	MAL; DNS	ESP; 4	ITA; 1	EUR; 4	GER; 2	NED; Ret	HUN; 4	FRA; Ret	GBR; Ret	BRA; 7	RSA; 5			4th	99
1993	500cc	Suzuki	**AUS**; 1	**MAL**; 3	**JPN**; 2	**ESP**; 1	**AUT**; 1	GER; 2	NED; 1	EUR; 3	RSM; 2	**GBR**; Ret	CZE; 5	ITA; 3	USA; 4	FIM; 3		**1st**	**248**
1994	500cc	Suzuki	AUS; 4	MAL; 6	JPN; 1	**ESP**; 2	AUT; 2	GER; 2	NED; 5	ITA; 3	FRA; Ret	GBR; 1	CZE; 7	USA	ARG	EUR		4th	169
1995	500cc	Suzuki	AUS; 5	MAL; 4	JPN; 6	ESP	GER	ITA	NED	FRA	GBR	CZE	BRA	ARG	EUR			15th	34

=== NASCAR ===
(key) (Bold – Pole position awarded by qualifying time. Italics – Pole position earned by points standings or practice time. * – Most laps led.)

==== Busch Series ====
NASCAR Busch Series results
Year	Team	No.	Make	1	2	3	4	5	6	7	8	9	10	11	12	13	14	15	16	17	18	19	20	21	22	23	24	25	26	27	28	29	30	31	32	NBSC	Pts	Ref
1997	Lone Star Motorsports	65	Chevy	DAY	CAR	RCH	ATL	LVS	DAR	HCY	TEX	BRI	NSV	TAL	NHA	NZH	CLT	DOV	SBO	GLN	MLW	MYB	GTY	IRP	MCH	BRI	DAR	RCH	DOV	CLT; 29						66th	337	
1997	Lone Star Motorsports	88	Chevy																												CAL; 31	CAR; 38	HOM; 8			66th	337	
1998	Lone Star Motorsports	88	Chevy	DAY; 8	CAR; 32	LVS; 42	NSV; 32	DAR; 43	BRI	TEX; DNQ	HCY	TAL; 31	NHA; 24	NZH	CLT; 39	DOV	RCH	PPR; 21	GLN; 39	MLW	MYB	CAL	SBO	IRP	MCH; DNQ	BRI	DAR	RCH; DNQ	DOV	CLT; 35	GTY	CAR	ATL; 40	HOM; DNQ		50th	801	
1999	Mark III Racine	78	Chevy	DAY	CAR	LVS	ATL	DAR	TEX	NSV	BRI	TAL	CAL	NHA	RCH	NZH	CLT; 36	DOV	SBO	GLN	MLW	MYB	PPR	GTY	IRP	MCH	BRI	DAR	RCH							90th	161	
1999	Sasser Motorsports	65	Chevy																											DOV; 19	CLT; DNQ	CAR	MEM	PHO	HOM	90th	161	

== Bibliography ==
- Clifford, Peter; Schwantz, Kevin (January 1, 1994). Kevin Schwantz: The World's Champion. Peter Clifford Publishing. ISBN 978-0473026257.

Sporting positions
Preceded by Ron Haslam	Macau Motorcycle Grand Prix Winner; 1988	Succeeded by Robert Dunlop
