= Graeme Haslem =

Australian rules footballer

Personal information
- Full name: Graeme Haslem
- Born: 8 October 1940 (age 86)
- Original team: Kyabram
- Height: 168 cm (5 ft 6 in)
- Weight: 72 kg (159 lb)

Playing career^{1}
Years	Club	Games (Goals)
1961–63	Hawthorn	8 (0)
- ^{1} Playing statistics correct to the end of 1963.

Graeme Haslem (born 8 October 1940) is a former Australian rules footballer who played with Hawthorn in the Victorian Football League (VFL).
