= 1993 Italian motorcycle Grand Prix =

(Italy) 1993 Italian Grand Prix
Race details
- Race 12 of 14 races in the 1993 Grand Prix motorcycle racing season
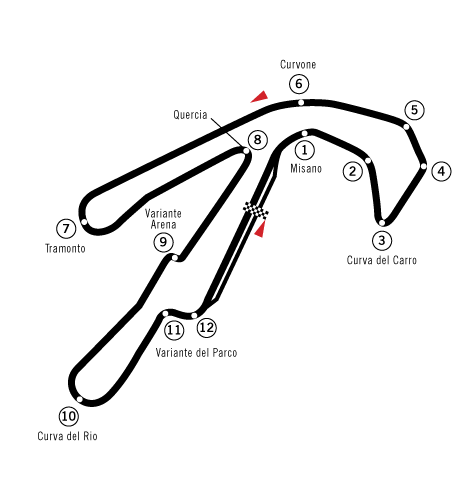
- Date: 5 September 1993
- Official name: Gran Premio d'Italia
- Location: Circuito Internazionale Santa Monica
- Course: Permanent racing facility; 4.060 km (2.523 mi)

500cc
Pole position
- Rider: (Italy) Luca Cadalora
- Time: 1:33.661
Fastest lap
- Rider: (Australia) Mick Doohan
- Time: 1:34.289
Podium
- First: (Italy) Luca Cadalora
- Second: (Australia) Mick Doohan
- Third: (United States) Kevin Schwantz

250cc
Pole position
- Rider: (Italy) Max Biaggi
- Time: 1:35.804
Fastest lap
- Rider: (Japan) Tetsuya Harada
- Time: 1:35.782
Podium
- First: (France) Jean-Philippe Ruggia
- Second: (Italy) Loris Capirossi
- Third: (Italy) Loris Reggiani

125cc
Pole position
- Rider: (Japan) Kazuto Sakata
- Time: 1:40.784
Fastest lap
- Rider: (Germany) Dirk Raudies
- Time: 1:41.088
Podium
- First: (Germany) Dirk Raudies
- Second: (Japan) Kazuto Sakata
- Third: (Germany) Peter Öttl

The 1993 Italian motorcycle Grand Prix was the twelfth race of the 1993 Grand Prix motorcycle racing season. It took place on 5 September 1993 at the Circuito Internazionale Santa Monica.

== 500 cc race report ==
Luca Cadalora received his first pole of the season at his home race, sending the Italian press into a frenzy. He would go on to receive seven more poles in his 500 career. Cadalora got lead at the start from Wayne Rainey and John Kocinski. Kevin Schwantz passed Kocinski and closed in 3rd. Rainey rode aggressively and qualified .021 seconds behind Cadalora.

Rainey, in the lead, went through the fast right-hander and got on the gas too early. The back end of his bike went out of control, causing him to lowside. As he slid off the track, the deep furrows in the gravel somersaulted him end-over-end and he landed heavily on his head. He was helicoptered away from circuit with a broken spine.

“I laid there in the sandtrap. The pain I was feeling was ... unbelievable. It felt like there was a hole in the middle of my chest.”

— Wayne Rainey

Mick Doohan got past Schwantz hoping to catch Cadalora, but was unable to pass him. The Italian fans swarmed the track when Cadalora won.

This was the last race of the former world champion Freddie Spencer.

== After the race ==
Tad Pilati of the Roberts team said of Rainey:

“There’s no feeling from the center of his chest down. He’s being held at a hospital near Rimini. He’s in stable condition, and the next 48 hours are going to tell us everything.”

Rainey ended up paralysed from the chest down and would never walk again. However, he stayed in motorcycle racing in management roles and has raced in a hand-control shifter kart, often with his motorcycle racing rival Eddie Lawson. Rainey has raced in the shifter kart exhibition race held at Red Bull United States Grand Prix, which features motorcycle racing legends.

Grand Prix motorcycle racing did not return to Circuito Internazionale Santa Monica until 2007. By then, the circuit had been modified and rerouted clockwise.

== 500 cc classification ==
Pos.	Rider	Team	Manufacturer	Time/Retired	Points
1	(Italy) Luca Cadalora	Marlboro Team Roberts	Yamaha	45:59.165	25
2	(Australia) Mick Doohan	Rothmans Honda Team	Honda	+0.358	20
3	(United States) Kevin Schwantz	Lucky Strike Suzuki	Suzuki	+8.016	16
4	(United States) John Kocinski	Cagiva Team Agostini	Cagiva	+16.299	13
5	(Brazil) Alex Barros	Lucky Strike Suzuki	Suzuki	+42.135	11
6	(Spain) Àlex Crivillé	Marlboro Honda Pons	Honda	+42.422	10
7	(Australia) Daryl Beattie	Rothmans Honda Team	Honda	+42.500	9
8	(Japan) Shinichi Itoh	HRC Rothmans Honda	Honda	+49.983	8
9	(United Kingdom) Niall Mackenzie	Valvoline Team WCM	ROC Yamaha	+50.727	7
10	(United States) Doug Chandler	Cagiva Team Agostini	Cagiva	+1:04.439	6
11	(United Kingdom) John Reynolds	Padgett's Motorcycles	Harris Yamaha	+1:15.487	5
12	(Spain) Juan Lopez Mella	Lopez Mella Racing Team	ROC Yamaha	+1:22.459	4
13	(France) Bernard Garcia	Yamaha Motor France	Yamaha	+1:22.708	3
14	(United States) Freddie Spencer	Yamaha Motor France	Yamaha	+1:28.647	2
15	(Germany) Michael Rudroff	Rallye Sport	Harris Yamaha	+1:39.303	1
16	(France) José Kuhn	Euromoto	Yamaha	+1 Lap	
17	(Italy) Lucio Pedercini	Team Pedercini	ROC Yamaha	+1 Lap	
18	(New Zealand) Andrew Stroud	Team Harris	Harris Yamaha	+1 Lap	
19	(United Kingdom) Jeremy McWilliams	Millar Racing	Yamaha	+1 Lap	
20	(Italy) Renato Colleoni	Team Elit	ROC Yamaha	+1 Lap	
21	(Belgium) Laurent Naveau	Euro Team	ROC Yamaha	+1 Lap	
22	(United Kingdom) David Jefferies	Peter Graves Racing Team	Harris Yamaha	+1 Lap	
23	(Japan) Tsutomu Udagawa	Team Udagawa	ROC Yamaha	+1 Lap	
24	(Austria) Andreas Meklau	Austrian Racing Company	ROC Yamaha	+1 Lap	
25	(France) Bruno Bonhuil	MTD Objectif 500	ROC Yamaha	+2 Laps	
26	(Italy) Romolo Balbi	Gibi Team	ROC Yamaha	+2 Laps	
Ret	(Australia) Matthew Mladin	Cagiva Team Agostini	Cagiva	Retirement	
Ret	(United Kingdom) Sean Emmett	Shell Team Harris	Harris Yamaha	Retirement	
Ret	(Switzerland) Serge David	Team ROC	ROC Yamaha	Retirement	
Ret	(Italy) Aldeo Presciutti	Se.Te.Ces.Co	ROC Yamaha	Retirement	
Ret	(Netherlands) Cees Doorakkers	Doorakkers Racing	Harris Yamaha	Retirement	
Ret	(United States) Wayne Rainey	Marlboro Team Roberts	Yamaha	Retirement	
Ret	(Italy) Marco Papa	Librenti Corse	Harris Yamaha	Retirement	
Ret	(United Kingdom) Kevin Mitchell	MBM Racing	Harris Yamaha	Retirement	
Ret	(France) Thierry Crine	Ville de Paris	ROC Yamaha	Retirement	

== 250 cc classification ==
Pos	Rider	Manufacturer	Time/Retired	Points
1	(France) Jean-Philippe Ruggia	Aprilia	43:39.138	25
2	(Italy) Loris Capirossi	Honda	+10.425	20
3	(Italy) Loris Reggiani	Aprilia	+24.452	16
4	(Germany) Helmut Bradl	Honda	+25.596	13
5	(Spain) Alberto Puig	Honda	+25.638	11
6	(Japan) Nobuatsu Aoki	Honda	+25.739	10
7	(Japan) Tadayuki Okada	Honda	+25.982	9
8	(Italy) Pierfrancesco Chili	Yamaha	+27.520	8
9	(Netherlands) Wilco Zeelenberg	Aprilia	+33.500	7
10	(Germany) Jochen Schmid	Yamaha	+38.913	6
11	(New Zealand) Simon Crafar	Suzuki	+43.550	5
12	(Italy) Paolo Casoli	Gilera	+1:03.766	4
13	(Austria) Andreas Preining	Aprilia	+1:08.507	3
14	(Netherlands) Patrick vd Goorbergh	Aprilia	+1:08.849	2
15	(Switzerland) Adrian Bosshard	Honda	+1:09.464	1
16	(Switzerland) Bernard Haenggeli	Aprilia	+1:19.877	
17	(Spain) Pere Riba	Honda	+1:20.046	
18	(Italy) Giuseppe Fiorillo	Aprilia	+1:24.341	
19	(France) Jean-Michel Bayle	Aprilia	+1:29.972	
20	(Spain) Carlos Checa	Honda	+1:31.648	
21	(Germany) Bernd Kassner	Aprilia	+1:31.901	
22	(Germany) Volker Bähr	Honda	+1 Lap	
23	(Italy) Davide Bulega	Aprilia	+1 Lap	
Ret	(France) Frédéric Protat	Aprilia	Retirement	
Ret	(Japan) Tetsuya Harada	Yamaha	Retirement	
Ret	(Italy) Max Biaggi	Honda	Retirement	
Ret	(Spain) Luis Maurel	Aprilia	Retirement	
Ret	(Italy) Massimo Pennacchioli	Honda	Retirement	
Ret	(France) Jean-Pierre Jeandat	Aprilia	Retirement	
Ret	(Italy) Alessandro Gramigni	Gilera	Retirement	
Ret	(Italy) Doriano Romboni	Honda	Retirement	
Ret	(Spain) Luis d'Antin	Honda	Retirement	
Ret	(Netherlands) Jurgen vd Goorbergh	Aprilia	Retirement	
Ret	(Switzerland) Eskil Suter	Aprilia	Retirement	
Ret	(Spain) Juan Borja	Honda	Retirement	

Previous race: 1993 Czech Republic Grand Prix	FIM Grand Prix World Championship; 1993 season	Next race: 1993 United States Grand Prix
Previous race: 1992 Italian Grand Prix	Italian Grand Prix	Next race: 1994 Italian Grand Prix
