= British motorcycle Grand Prix =

Motorcycle race held in the United Kingdom

British Grand Prix

Grand Prix motorcycle racing
- Venue: Silverstone Circuit (1977–1986, 2010–2017, 2019, 2021–present); Donington Park (1987–2009)
- First race: 1977
- Most wins (rider): Valentino Rossi (8)
- Most wins (manufacturer): Honda (42)

The British motorcycle Grand Prix is a motorcycling event that is part of the FIM Grand Prix motorcycle racing season.

== History ==
Before 1977, the only British round was the Isle of Man TT, which was part of the FIM championship from its inauguration in 1949 until 1976.

The Isle of Man TT was the most prestigious event on the Grand Prix motorcycling calendar from 1949 to 1972. After the 1972 event, multiple world champion Giacomo Agostini dropped a bombshell on the motorsports world by stating he would never race at the Isle of Man TT again, saying the 37-mile (62 km) circuit was too dangerous for international competition. His friend Gilberto Parlotti was killed during the event. Many riders followed Agostini's boycotting of the next four events, and after the 1976 season, the Isle of Man TT was scratched from the FIM calendar.

The inaugural British motorcycle Grand Prix, the first motorcycle Grand Prix to be held on the British mainland, took place at the Silverstone Circuit. The event was moved to Donington Park in 1987 before returning to Silverstone in 2010.

Donington Park, used from 1987 to 2009

Dorna Sports, the commercial rights holder of what is now known as MotoGP, revealed that they had signed a deal for the British Grand Prix to be moved to the yet-to-be constructed Circuit of Wales from 2015. However, when the developer indicated that the circuit would only be ready in 2016, the British motorcycle Grand Prix was slated to return to Donington Park for 2015 only but pulled out of hosting the event on 10 February 2015, citing financial difficulties. The following day, it was announced that Silverstone would host the British Grand Prix in 2015 and 2016. In September 2016, following further delays to the construction of the Circuit of Wales, Silverstone reached an agreement to continue hosting the event in 2017 with a further option for 2018.

In early November 2017, Silverstone announced a three-year deal to host the races in 2018, 2019 and 2020.

There was no race in 2018 due to weather conditions; it resumed in 2019. The 2019 British motorcycle Grand Prix saw one of the closest finishes in MotoGP history, when Álex Rins won the race ahead of Marc Márquez by 0.014 seconds. The 2020 race was cancelled due to the outbreak of COVID-19.

The start/finish straight was relocated from the National Pits Straight to the Hamilton Straight, starting from the 2023 British motorcycle Grand Prix.

== Official names and sponsors ==
- 1977–1978: John Player British Grand Prix
- 1979–1985: Marlboro British Grand Prix
- 1986–1988: Shell Oils British Motorcycle Grand Prix
- 1989–1991: Shell British Motorcycle Grand Prix
- 1992: Rothmans British Grand Prix
- 1993, 1995–1996, 1998–1999, 2009: British Grand Prix (no official sponsor)
- 1994: British Motorcycle Grand Prix (no official sponsor)
- 1997: Sun British Grand Prix
- 2000–2004: Cinzano British Grand Prix
- 2005: betandwin.com British Grand Prix
- 2006: GAS British Grand Prix
- 2007: Nickel&Dime British Grand Prix
- 2008: bwin.com British Grand Prix
- 2010–2011: AirAsia British Grand Prix
- 2012–2014: Hertz British Grand Prix
- 2015–2017: Octo British Grand Prix
- 2018–2019: GoPro British Grand Prix (cancelled in 2018)
- 2021–2024: Monster Energy British Grand Prix
- 2025: Tissot Grand Prix of the United Kingdom
- 2026: Qatar Airways Grand Prix of Great Britain

== Winners ==
=== Multiple winners (riders) ===
# Wins	Rider	Wins	
# Wins	Rider	Category	Years won
8	(Italy) Valentino Rossi	MotoGP	2002, 2004, 2005, 2015
8	(Italy) Valentino Rossi	500cc	2000, 2001
8	(Italy) Valentino Rossi	250cc	1999
8	(Italy) Valentino Rossi	125cc	1997
6	(South Africa) Kork Ballington	350cc	1977, 1978, 1979
6	(South Africa) Kork Ballington	250cc	1977, 1979, 1980
6	(Spain) Ángel Nieto	125cc	1978, 1979, 1981, 1982, 1983, 1984
6	(West Germany) Anton Mang	350cc	1980, 1981
6	(West Germany) Anton Mang	250cc	1978, 1981, 1985, 1987
4	(Italy) Luca Cadalora	500cc	1993
4	(Italy) Luca Cadalora	250cc	1988, 1990, 1991
4	(United States) Kevin Schwantz	500cc	1989, 1990, 1991, 1994
4	(Italy) Loris Capirossi	250cc	1994, 1998
4	(Italy) Loris Capirossi	125cc	1990, 1991
4	(Spain) Jorge Lorenzo	MotoGP	2010, 2012, 2013
4	(Spain) Jorge Lorenzo	250cc	2006
4	(Italy) Andrea Dovizioso	MotoGP	2009, 2017
4	(Italy) Andrea Dovizioso	250cc	2007
4	(Italy) Andrea Dovizioso	125cc	2004
3	(United States) Kenny Roberts	500cc	1978, 1979, 1983
3	(Australia) Mick Doohan	500cc	1995, 1996, 1997
3	(Italy) Max Biaggi	MotoGP	2003
3	(Italy) Max Biaggi	250cc	1995, 1996
3	(Australia) Casey Stoner	MotoGP	2007, 2008, 2011
2	(United States) Randy Mamola	500cc	1980, 1984
2	(Austria) August Auinger	125cc	1985, 1986
2	(Italy) Fausto Gresini	125cc	1987, 1992
2	(Australia) Wayne Gardner	500cc	1986, 1992
2	(Japan) Kazuto Sakata	125cc	1995, 1998
2	(Germany) Ralf Waldmann	250cc	1997, 2000
2	(Japan) Youichi Ui	125cc	2000, 2001
2	(Spain) Dani Pedrosa	MotoGP	2006
2	(Spain) Dani Pedrosa	250cc	2004
2	(Spain) Julián Simón	125cc	2005, 2009
2	(United Kingdom) Scott Redding	Moto2	2013
2	(United Kingdom) Scott Redding	125cc	2008
2	(Spain) Marc Márquez	MotoGP	2014
2	(Spain) Marc Márquez	125cc	2010
2	(Spain) Maverick Viñales	MotoGP	2016
2	(Spain) Maverick Viñales	Moto3	2012
2	(Spain) Álex Rins	MotoGP	2019
2	(Spain) Álex Rins	Moto3	2014
2	(Spain) Augusto Fernández	Moto2	2019, 2022

=== Multiple winners (manufacturers) ===
# Wins	Manufacturer	Wins	
# Wins	Manufacturer	Category	Years won
42	(Japan) Honda	MotoGP	2002, 2003, 2006, 2009, 2011, 2014
42	(Japan) Honda	500cc	1984, 1985, 1986, 1992, 1995, 1996, 1997, 1999, 2000, 2001
42	(Japan) Honda	250cc	1985, 1986, 1987, 1988, 1989, 1991, 1994, 1997, 2001, 2004, 2007, 2009
42	(Japan) Honda	Moto3	2014, 2015, 2017, 2019, 2022
42	(Japan) Honda	125cc	1988, 1989, 1990, 1991, 1992, 1993, 1994, 1999, 2004
25	(Italy) Aprilia	MotoGP	2023, 2025, 2026
25	(Italy) Aprilia	250cc	1992, 1993, 1995, 1996, 1998, 1999, 2000, 2002, 2003, 2005, 2006
25	(Italy) Aprilia	125cc	1995, 1996, 1997, 1998, 2002, 2003, 2006, 2007, 2008, 2009, 2011
19	(Japan) Yamaha	MotoGP	2004, 2005, 2010, 2012, 2013, 2015, 2021
19	(Japan) Yamaha	500cc	1978, 1979, 1983, 1987, 1988, 1993, 1998
19	(Japan) Yamaha	350cc	1977
19	(Japan) Yamaha	250cc	1977, 1982, 1984, 1990
13	(Germany) Kalex	Moto2	2011, 2012, 2013, 2014, 2015, 2016, 2017, 2019, 2021, 2022, 2024, 2025, 2026
10	(Japan) Suzuki	MotoGP	2016, 2019
10	(Japan) Suzuki	500cc	1977, 1980, 1981, 1982, 1989, 1990, 1991, 1994
8	(Japan) Kawasaki	350cc	1978, 1979, 1981, 1982
8	(Japan) Kawasaki	250cc	1978, 1979, 1980, 1981
7	(Italy) Ducati	MotoGP	2007, 2008, 2017, 2022, 2024
7	(Italy) Ducati	MotoE	2023 Race 1, 2023 Race 2
7	(Austria) KTM	250cc	2008
7	(Austria) KTM	Moto3	2013, 2016, 2024, 2025, 2026
7	(Austria) KTM	125cc	2005
5	(Italy) Garelli	125cc	1981, 1982, 1983, 1984, 1987
4	(Spain) Derbi	125cc	2000, 2001, 2010
4	(Spain) Derbi	80cc	1987
3	(Italy) Minarelli	125cc	1978, 1979, 1980
3	(Italy) Morbidelli	125cc	1977, 1985, 1986
2	(Switzerland) Krauser	350cc	1980
2	(Switzerland) Krauser	80cc	1986

=== By year ===
Year	Track	Moto3		Moto2		MotoGP		Report
Year	Track	Rider	Manufacturer	Rider	Manufacturer	Rider	Manufacturer	Report
2026	Silverstone	(Spain) David Almansa	KTM	(Czech Republic) Filip Salač	Kalex	(Spain) Raúl Fernández	Aprilia	Report
2025	Silverstone	(Spain) José Antonio Rueda	KTM	(Australia) Senna Agius	Kalex	(Italy) Marco Bezzecchi	Aprilia	Report
2024	Silverstone	(Spain) Iván Ortolá	KTM	(United Kingdom) Jake Dixon	Kalex	(Italy) Enea Bastianini	Ducati	Report

Year	Track	MotoE				Moto3		Moto2		MotoGP		Report
Year	Track	Race 1		Race 2		Moto3		Moto2		MotoGP		Report
Year	Track	Rider	Manufacturer	Rider	Manufacturer	Rider	Manufacturer	Rider	Manufacturer	Rider	Manufacturer	Report
2023	Silverstone	(Switzerland) Randy Krummenacher	Ducati	(Italy) Mattia Casadei	Ducati	(Colombia) David Alonso	GasGas	(Spain) Fermín Aldeguer	Boscoscuro	(Spain) Aleix Espargaró	Aprilia	Report

Year	Track	Moto3		Moto2		MotoGP		Report
Year	Track	Rider	Manufacturer	Rider	Manufacturer	Rider	Manufacturer	Report
2022	Silverstone	(Italy) Dennis Foggia	Honda	(Spain) Augusto Fernández	Kalex	(Italy) Francesco Bagnaia	Ducati	Report
2021	Silverstone	(Italy) Romano Fenati	Husqvarna	(Australia) Remy Gardner	Kalex	(France) Fabio Quartararo	Yamaha	Report
2020	Silverstone	Cancelled due to COVID-19 concerns						
2019	Silverstone	(Spain) Marcos Ramírez	Honda	(Spain) Augusto Fernández	Kalex	(Spain) Álex Rins	Suzuki	Report
2018	Silverstone	Cancelled due to poor weather						Report
2017	Silverstone	(Spain) Arón Canet	Honda	(Japan) Takaaki Nakagami	Kalex	(Italy) Andrea Dovizioso	Ducati	Report
2016	Silverstone	(South Africa) Brad Binder	KTM	(Switzerland) Thomas Lüthi	Kalex	(Spain) Maverick Viñales	Suzuki	Report
2015	Silverstone	(United Kingdom) Danny Kent	Honda	(France) Johann Zarco	Kalex	(Italy) Valentino Rossi	Yamaha	Report
2014	Silverstone	(Spain) Álex Rins	Honda	(Spain) Esteve Rabat	Kalex	(Spain) Marc Márquez	Honda	Report
2013	Silverstone	(Spain) Luis Salom	KTM	(United Kingdom) Scott Redding	Kalex	(Spain) Jorge Lorenzo	Yamaha	Report
2012	Silverstone	(Spain) Maverick Viñales	FTR-Honda	(Spain) Pol Espargaró	Kalex	(Spain) Jorge Lorenzo	Yamaha	Report
Year	Track	125cc		Moto2		MotoGP		Report
Year	Track	Rider	Manufacturer	Rider	Manufacturer	Rider	Manufacturer	Report
2011	Silverstone	(Germany) Jonas Folger	Aprilia	(Germany) Stefan Bradl	Kalex	(Australia) Casey Stoner	Honda	Report
2010	Silverstone	(Spain) Marc Márquez	Derbi	(France) Jules Cluzel	Suter	(Spain) Jorge Lorenzo	Yamaha	Report
Year	Track	125cc		250cc		MotoGP		Report
Year	Track	Rider	Manufacturer	Rider	Manufacturer	Rider	Manufacturer	Report
2009	Donington	(Spain) Julián Simón	Aprilia	(Japan) Hiroshi Aoyama	Honda	(Italy) Andrea Dovizioso	Honda	Report
2008	Donington	(United Kingdom) Scott Redding	Aprilia	(Finland) Mika Kallio	KTM	(Australia) Casey Stoner	Ducati	Report
2007	Donington	(Italy) Mattia Pasini	Aprilia	(Italy) Andrea Dovizioso	Honda	(Australia) Casey Stoner	Ducati	Report
2006	Donington	(Spain) Álvaro Bautista	Aprilia	(Spain) Jorge Lorenzo	Aprilia	(Spain) Dani Pedrosa	Honda	Report
2005	Donington	(Spain) Julián Simón	KTM	(France) Randy de Puniet	Aprilia	(Italy) Valentino Rossi	Yamaha	Report
2004	Donington	(Italy) Andrea Dovizioso	Honda	(Spain) Daniel Pedrosa	Honda	(Italy) Valentino Rossi	Yamaha	Report
2003	Donington	(Spain) Héctor Barberá	Aprilia	(Spain) Fonsi Nieto	Aprilia	(Italy) Max Biaggi	Honda	Report
2002	Donington	(France) Arnaud Vincent	Aprilia	(Italy) Marco Melandri	Aprilia	(Italy) Valentino Rossi	Honda	Report
Year	Track	125cc		250cc		500cc		Report
Year	Track	Rider	Manufacturer	Rider	Manufacturer	Rider	Manufacturer	Report
2001	Donington	(Japan) Youichi Ui	Derbi	(Japan) Daijiro Kato	Honda	(Italy) Valentino Rossi	Honda	Report
2000	Donington	(Japan) Youichi Ui	Derbi	(Germany) Ralf Waldmann	Aprilia	(Italy) Valentino Rossi	Honda	Report
1999	Donington	(Japan) Masao Azuma	Honda	(Italy) Valentino Rossi	Aprilia	(Spain) Àlex Crivillé	Honda	Report
1998	Donington	(Japan) Kazuto Sakata	Aprilia	(Italy) Loris Capirossi	Aprilia	(New Zealand) Simon Crafar	Yamaha	Report
1997	Donington	(Italy) Valentino Rossi	Aprilia	(Germany) Ralf Waldmann	Honda	(Australia) Mick Doohan	Honda	Report
1996	Donington	(Italy) Stefano Perugini	Aprilia	(Italy) Max Biaggi	Aprilia	(Australia) Mick Doohan	Honda	Report
1995	Donington	(Japan) Kazuto Sakata	Aprilia	(Italy) Max Biaggi	Aprilia	(Australia) Mick Doohan	Honda	Report
1994	Donington	(Japan) Takeshi Tsujimura	Honda	(Italy) Loris Capirossi	Honda	(United States) Kevin Schwantz	Suzuki	Report
1993	Donington	(Germany) Dirk Raudies	Honda	(France) Jean-Philippe Ruggia	Aprilia	(Italy) Luca Cadalora	Yamaha	Report
1992	Donington	(Italy) Fausto Gresini	Honda	(Italy) Pierfrancesco Chili	Aprilia	(Australia) Wayne Gardner	Honda	Report
1991	Donington	(Italy) Loris Capirossi	Honda	(Italy) Luca Cadalora	Honda	(United States) Kevin Schwantz	Suzuki	Report
1990	Donington	(Italy) Loris Capirossi	Honda	(Italy) Luca Cadalora	Yamaha	(United States) Kevin Schwantz	Suzuki	Report

Year	Track	80cc		125cc		250cc		500cc		Report
Year	Track	Rider	Manufacturer	Rider	Manufacturer	Rider	Manufacturer	Rider	Manufacturer	Report
1989	Donington			(Netherlands) Hans Spaan	Honda	(Spain) Sito Pons	Honda	(United States) Kevin Schwantz	Suzuki	Report
1988	Donington			(Italy) Ezio Gianola	Honda	(Italy) Luca Cadalora	Honda	(United States) Wayne Rainey	Yamaha	Report
1987	Donington	(Spain) Jorge Martínez	Derbi	(Italy) Fausto Gresini	Garelli	(West Germany) Anton Mang	Honda	(United States) Eddie Lawson	Yamaha	Report
1986	Silverstone	(United Kingdom) Ian McConnachie	Krauser	(Austria) August Auinger	MBA	(France) Dominique Sarron	Honda	(Australia) Wayne Gardner	Honda	Report
1985	Silverstone			(Austria) August Auinger	MBA	(West Germany) Anton Mang	Honda	(United States) Freddie Spencer	Honda	Report
1984	Silverstone			(Spain) Ángel Nieto	Garelli	(France) Christian Sarron	Yamaha	(United States) Randy Mamola	Honda	Report
Year	Track	50cc		125cc		250cc		500cc		Report
Year	Track	Rider	Manufacturer	Rider	Manufacturer	Rider	Manufacturer	Rider	Manufacturer	Report
1983	Silverstone			(Spain) Ángel Nieto	Garelli	(France) Jacques Bolle	Pernod	(United States) Kenny Roberts	Yamaha	Report

Year	Track	50cc		125cc		250cc		350cc		500cc		Report
Year	Track	Rider	Manufacturer	Rider	Manufacturer	Rider	Manufacturer	Rider	Manufacturer	Rider	Manufacturer	Report
1982	Silverstone			(Spain) Ángel Nieto	Garelli	(West Germany) Martin Wimmer	Yamaha	(France) Jean-François Baldé	Kawasaki	(Italy) Franco Uncini	Suzuki	Report
1981	Silverstone			(Spain) Ángel Nieto	Garelli	(West Germany) Anton Mang	Kawasaki	(West Germany) Anton Mang	Kawasaki	(Netherlands) Jack Middelburg	Suzuki	Report
1980	Silverstone			(Italy) Loris Reggiani	Minarelli	(South Africa) Kork Ballington	Kawasaki	(West Germany) Anton Mang	Krauser	(United States) Randy Mamola	Suzuki	Report
1979	Silverstone			(Spain) Ángel Nieto	Minarelli	(South Africa) Kork Ballington	Kawasaki	(South Africa) Kork Ballington	Kawasaki	(United States) Kenny Roberts	Yamaha	Report
1978	Silverstone			(Spain) Ángel Nieto	Minarelli	(West Germany) Anton Mang	Kawasaki	(South Africa) Kork Ballington	Kawasaki	(United States) Kenny Roberts	Yamaha	Report
1977	Silverstone			(Italy) Pierluigi Conforti	Morbidelli	(South Africa) Kork Ballington	Yamaha	(South Africa) Kork Ballington	Yamaha	(United States) Pat Hennen	Suzuki	Report
