= Fred Haslam (footballer) =

English footballer (1899–1971)

Personal information
- Full name: Frederick Gill Haslam
- Date of birth: 6 January 1899
- Place of birth: Blackpool, England
- Date of death: 1971 (aged 71–72)
- Position: Goalkeeper

Senior career*
Years	Team	Apps	(Gls)
1924–1925	Lytham		
1925–1926	Stockport County	31	(0)
1926	Chorley		
Total		31	(0)
- * Club domestic league appearances and goals

Frederick Gill Haslam (6 January 1899 – 1971) was an English footballer who played in the Football League for Stockport County.
