= Erv Kanemoto =

American motorcycle mechanic

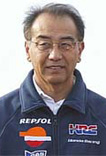
- Born: Ervin Kanemoto; May 7, 1943 (age 83); Utah, Salt Lake City, U.S.
- Occupations: Mechanic, race team owner
- Years active: 1968–2002

Ervin Kanemoto (born May 7, 1943) is an American former Grand Prix motorcycle mechanic and motorcycle race team owner. He was one of the most successful motorcycle racing tuners and race team crew chiefs of the 1970s through the early 2000s, working with motorcycle racers who won two national championships and six world championships. He is best known for his association with motorcycle racers Gary Nixon and Freddie Spencer.

== Motorcycling career ==
Kanemoto was born in Utah and grew up on a farm near San Jose, California. He began boat racing at the age of 15 then switched to tuning karts raced by his sister. He was hired as a race mechanic by Kawasaki in 1968 and became known for his partnership with motorcycle racer Gary Nixon when they won the 1973 U.S. Road Racing National Championship aboard a temperamental and brutally fast Kawasaki KR750 with a three cylinder, two-stroke engine. The duo competed at the international level in the 1976 Formula 750 championship, laying claim to the Formula 750 world championship until international politics denied them that prize.

When Nixon retired in 1979, Kanemoto joined a young up and coming road racer named Freddie Spencer and won the U.S. 250cc Road Racing National Championship with a Yamaha. He spent the 1980 season with Spencer before moving to Europe in 1981 to be a Yamaha mechanic for former 500cc world champion Barry Sheene.

Kanemoto is perhaps best known for the world championships won with Spencer for the Honda Grand Prix team in 1983 and 1985 when Spencer accomplished the double by winning both the 250cc and the 500cc Road Racing World Championships in the same year, a feat that will never be repeated due to the discontinuation of the 250cc and 500cc classes in current MotoGP competition.

Kanemoto joined forces with Eddie Lawson in 1989 to win another 500cc World Championship for Honda. Kanemoto also won 250cc World Championships for Honda in 1991 and 1992 with Luca Cadalora as the rider, and in 1997 with Max Biaggi as the rider.

In 2001, Kanemoto was inducted into the AMA Motorcycle Hall of Fame. Kanemoto is currently still involved in motorcycle Grand Prix racing as a consultant.
