= List of World Sidecar Championship medalists =

The Sidecar World Championship is an annual event held by the Fédération Internationale de Motocyclisme (FIM). The first World Championship tournament took place in 1949. As all other World Championships in moto racing, it consists of a series of races run throughout a calendar year in which the riders with the most accumulated points are awarded as world champions.

== Medalists ==
Event	Gold		Silver		Bronze	
1949	Eric Oliver; Great Britain	Denis Jenkinson; Great Britain	Ercole Frigerio; Italy	Edoardo Ricotti; Italy	Frans Vanderschrinck; Belgium	Martin Whitney; Great Britain
1950	Eric Oliver; Great Britain	Lorenzo Dobelli; Italy	Ercole Frigerio; Italy	Edoardo Ricotti; Italy	Hans Handelmann; Switzerland	Josef Albisser; Switzerland
1951	Eric Oliver; Great Britain	Lorenzo Dobelli; Italy	Ercole Frigerio; Italy	Edoardo Ricotti; Italy	Albino Milani; Italy	Giusseppe Pizzocri; Italy
1952	Cyril Smith; Great Britain	Bob Clemens; Great Britain	Albino Milani; Italy	Giusseppe Pizzocri; Italy	Ernesto Merlo; Italy	Dino Magri; Italy
1953	Eric Oliver; Great Britain	Stanley Dibben; Great Britain	Cyril Smith; Great Britain	Bob Clemens; Great Britain	Hans Handelmann; Switzerland	Josef Albisser; Switzerland
1954	Wilhelm Noll; West Germany	Fritz Cron; West Germany	Eric Oliver; Great Britain	Les Nutt; Great Britain	Cyril Smith; Great Britain	Stanley Dibben; Great Britain
1955	Willy Faust; West Germany	Karl Remmert; West Germany	Wilhelm Noll; West Germany	Fritz Cron; West Germany	Walter Schneider; Great Britain	Hans Strauss; West Germany
1956	Wilhelm Noll; West Germany	Fritz Cron; West Germany	Fritz Hillebrand; West Germany	Manfred Grünwald; West Germany	Peter Harris; Great Britain	Ray Campbell; Great Britain
1957	Fritz Hillebrand; West Germany	Manfred Grünwald; West Germany	Walter Schneider; Great Britain	Hans Strauss; West Germany	Florian Camathias; Switzerland	Josef Galliker; West Germany
1958	Walter Schneider; Great Britain	Hans Strauss; West Germany	Florian Camathias; Switzerland	Hilmar Cecco; West Germany	Helmut Fath; West Germany	Fritz Rudolf; West Germany
1959	Walter Schneider; Great Britain	Hans Strauss; West Germany	Florian Camathias; Switzerland	Hilmar Cecco; West Germany	Fritz Scheidegger; Switzerland	Hans Burkhardt; West Germany
1960	Helmut Fath; West Germany	Alfred Wohlgemuth; West Germany	Fritz Scheidegger; Switzerland	Hans Burkhardt; West Germany	Peter Harris; Great Britain	Ray Campbell; Great Britain
1961	Max Deubel; West Germany	Emil Hörner; West Germany	Fritz Scheidegger; Switzerland	Hans Burkhardt; West Germany	Edgar Strub; Switzerland	Kurt Huber; West Germany; Roland Föll; West Germany
1962	Max Deubel; West Germany	Emil Hörner; West Germany	Florian Camathias; Switzerland	Harry Winter; Switzerland	Fritz Scheidegger; Switzerland	John Robinson; Switzerland
1963	Max Deubel; West Germany	Emil Hörner; West Germany	Florian Camathias; Switzerland	Alfred Herzig; Switzerland	Fritz Scheidegger; Switzerland	John Robinson; Switzerland
1964	Max Deubel; West Germany	Emil Hörner; West Germany	Fritz Scheidegger; Switzerland	John Robinson; Switzerland	Colin Seeley; Great Britain	Ray Campbell; Great Britain
1965	Fritz Scheidegger; Switzerland	John Robinson; Switzerland	Max Deubel; West Germany	Emil Hörner; West Germany	Georg Auerbacher; West Germany	Peter Rykers; Great Britain
1966	Fritz Scheidegger; Switzerland	John Robinson; Switzerland	Max Deubel; West Germany	Emil Hörner; West Germany	Georg Auerbacher; West Germany	Wolfgang Kalauch; West Germany; Eduard Dein; West Germany
1967	Klaus Enders; West Germany	Rolf Engelhardt; West Germany	Georg Auerbacher; West Germany	Eduard Dein; West Germany	Siegfried Schauzu; West Germany	Horst Schneider; West Germany
1968	Helmut Fath; West Germany	Wolfgang Kalauch; West Germany	Georg Auerbacher; West Germany	Hermann Hahn; West Germany; Henk de Wever; Netherlands	Siegfried Schauzu; West Germany	Horst Schneider; West Germany
1969	Klaus Enders; West Germany	Rolf Engelhardt; West Germany	Helmut Fath; West Germany	Wolfgang Kalauch; West Germany	Georg Auerbacher; West Germany	Hermann Hahn; West Germany
1970	Klaus Enders; West Germany	Rolf Engelhardt; West Germany; Wolfgang Kalauch; West Germany	Georg Auerbacher; West Germany	Hermann Hahn; West Germany	Siegfried Schauzu; West Germany	Horst Schneider; West Germany; Peter Rutherford; Great Britain
1971	Horst Owelse; West Germany	Julius Kremer; West Germany; Peter Rutherford; Great Britain	Siegfried Schauzu; West Germany	Wolfgang Kalauch; West Germany	Arsenius Butscher; West Germany	Josef Hüber; West Germany
1972	Klaus Enders; West Germany	Rolf Engelhardt; West Germany	Heinz Luthringshauser; West Germany	Hans-Jürgen Cusnick; West Germany	Siegfried Schauzu; West Germany	Wolfgang Kalauch; West Germany
1973	Klaus Enders; West Germany	Rolf Engelhardt; West Germany	Werner Schwärzel; West Germany	Karl-Hans Kleis; West Germany	Siegfried Schauzu; West Germany	Wolfgang Kalauch; West Germany
1974	Klaus Enders; West Germany	Rolf Engelhardt; West Germany	Werner Schwärzel; West Germany	Karl-Hans Kleis; West Germany	Siegfried Schauzu; West Germany	Wolfgang Kalauch; West Germany
1975	Rolf Steinhausen; West Germany	Josef Hübert; West Germany	Werner Schwärzel; West Germany	Andreas Hüber; West Germany	Rolf Biland; Switzerland	Freddy Freiburghaus; Switzerland; Bernd Grube; West Germany
1976	Rolf Steinhausen; West Germany	Josef Hübert; West Germany	Werner Schwärzel; West Germany	Andreas Hüber; West Germany	Hermann Schmid; Switzerland	Jean-Petit Matile; Switzerland
1977	George O'Dell; Great Britain	Kenneth Arthur; Great Britain; Cliff Husband; Great Britain	Rolf Biland; Switzerland	Kurt Waltisperg; Switzerland	Werner Schwärzel; West Germany	Andreas Hüber; West Germany
1978	Rolf Biland; Switzerland	Kenny Williams; Great Britain	Alain Michel; France	Stuart Collins; Great Britain	Bruno Holzer; Switzerland	Karl Meierhaus; Switzerland
1979 - B2A	Rolf Biland; Switzerland	Kurt Waltisperg; Switzerland	Rolf Steinhausen; West Germany	Kenneth Arthur; Great Britain	Dick Greasley; Great Britain	John Parkins; Great Britain
1979 - B2B	Bruno Holzer; Switzerland	Karl Meierhaus; Switzerland	Rolf Biland; Switzerland	Kurt Waltisperg; Switzerland	Masato Kumano; Japan	Isao Arifuku; Japan
1980	Jock Taylor; Great Britain	Benga Johansson; Sweden	Rolf Biland; Switzerland	Kurt Waltisperg; Switzerland	Alain Michel; France	Paul Gerard; France; Michael Burkhardt; West Germany
1981	Rolf Biland; Switzerland	Kurt Waltisperg; Switzerland	Alain Michel; France	Michael Burkhardt; West Germany	Jock Taylor; Great Britain	Benga Johansson; Sweden
1982	Werner Schwärzel; West Germany	Andreas Hüber; West Germany	Rolf Biland; Switzerland	Kurt Waltisperg; Switzerland	Alain Michel; France	Michael Burkhardt; West Germany
1983	Rolf Biland; Switzerland	Kurt Waltisperg; Switzerland	Egbert Streuer; Netherlands	Bernie Schneiders; Netherlands	Werner Schwärzel; West Germany	Andreas Hüber; West Germany
1984	Egbert Streuer; Netherlands	Bernie Schneiders; Netherlands	Werner Schwärzel; West Germany	Andreas Hüber; West Germany	Alain Michel; France	Jean-Marc Fresc; France
1985	Egbert Streuer; Netherlands	Bernie Schneiders; Netherlands	Werner Schwärzel; West Germany	Fritz Buck; West Germany	Rolf Biland; Switzerland	Kurt Waltisperg; Switzerland
1986	Egbert Streuer; Netherlands	Bernie Schneiders; Netherlands	Alain Michel; France	Jean-Marc Fresc; France	Steve Webster; Great Britain	Tony Hewitt; Great Britain
1987	Steve Webster; Great Britain	Tony Hewitt; Great Britain	Egbert Streuer; Netherlands	Bernie Schneiders; Netherlands	Rolf Biland; Switzerland	Kurt Waltisperg; Switzerland
1988	Steve Webster; Great Britain	Tony Hewitt; Great Britain; Gavin Simmonds; Great Britain	Rolf Biland; Switzerland	Kurt Waltisperg; Switzerland	Egbert Streuer; Netherlands	Bernie Schneiders; Netherlands
1989	Steve Webster; Great Britain	Tony Hewitt; Great Britain	Egbert Streuer; Netherlands	Geral de Haas; Netherlands	Alain Michel; France	Jean-Marc Fresc; France
1990	Alain Michel; France	Simon Birchall; Great Britain	Egbert Streuer; Netherlands	Geral de Haas; Netherlands	Steve Webster; Great Britain	Gavin Simmonds; Great Britain
1991	Steve Webster; Great Britain	Gavin Simmonds; Great Britain	Rolf Biland; Switzerland	Kurt Waltisperg; Switzerland	Egbert Streuer; Netherlands	Peter Brown; Great Britain; Pete Essaf; United States
1992	Rolf Biland; Switzerland	Kurt Waltisperg; Switzerland	Steve Webster; Great Britain	Gavin Simmonds; Great Britain	Klaus Klaffenböck; Austria	Christian Parzer; Austria
1993	Rolf Biland; Switzerland	Kurt Waltisperg; Switzerland	Steve Webster; Great Britain	Gavin Simmonds; Great Britain	Klaus Klaffenböck; Austria	Christian Parzer; Austria
1994	Rolf Biland; Switzerland	Kurt Waltisperg; Switzerland	Steve Webster; Great Britain	Adolf Hänni; Switzerland	Derek Brindley; Great Britain	Paul Hutchinson; Great Britain
1995	Darren Dixon; Great Britain	Andy Hetherington; Great Britain	Rolf Biland; Switzerland	Kurt Waltisperg; Switzerland	Markus Bösiger; Switzerland	Jürg Egli; Switzerland
1996	Darren Dixon; Great Britain	Andy Hetherington; Great Britain	Rolf Biland; Switzerland	Kurt Waltisperg; Switzerland	Steve Webster; Great Britain	David James; Great Britain
1997	Steve Webster; Great Britain	David James; Great Britain	Paul Güdel; Switzerland	Charly Güdel; Switzerland	Klaus Klaffenböck; Austria	Christian Parzer; Austria
1998	Steve Webster; Great Britain	David James; Great Britain	Klaus Klaffenböck; Austria	Adolf Hänni; Switzerland	Markus Schlosser; Switzerland	Daniel Hauser; Switzerland
1999	Steve Webster; Great Britain	David James; Great Britain	Klaus Klaffenböck; Austria	Adolf Hänni; Switzerland	Steve Abbott; Great Britain	James Biggs; Great Britain
2000	Steve Webster; Great Britain	Paul Woodhead; Great Britain	Klaus Klaffenböck; Austria	Adolf Hänni; Switzerland	Jörg Steinhausen; Germany	Christian Parzer; Austria
2001	Klaus Klaffenböck; Austria	Christian Parzer; Austria	Steve Webster; Great Britain	Paul Woodhead; Great Britain	Steve Abbott; Great Britain	James Biggs; Great Britain
2002	Steve Abbott; Great Britain	James Biggs; Great Britain	Jörg Steinhausen; Germany	Trevor Hopkinson; Great Britain	Klaus Klaffenböck; Austria	Christian Parzer; Austria
2003	Steve Webster; Great Britain	Paul Woodhead; Great Britain	Klaus Klaffenböck; Austria	Christian Parzer; Austria	Jörg Steinhausen; Germany	Trevor Hopkinson; Great Britain
2004	Steve Webster; Great Britain	Paul Woodhead; Great Britain	Martin van Gils; Netherlands	Tonnie van Gils; Netherlands	Mike Roscher; Germany	Adolf Hänni; Switzerland
2005	Tim Reeves; Great Britain	Tristan Reeves; Great Britain	Teo Manninen; Finland	Pekka Kuismanen; Finland	Jörg Steinhausen; Germany	Trevor Hopkinson; Great Britain
2006	Tim Reeves; Great Britain	Tristan Reeves; Great Britain	Pekka Päirvärinta; Finland	Timo Karttiala; Finland; Aki Aalto; Finland	Teo Manninen; Finland	Pekka Kuismanen; Finland
2007	Tim Reeves; Great Britain	Patrick Farrance; Great Britain	Pekka Päirvärinta; Finland	Timo Karttiala; Finland	Markus Schlosser; Switzerland	Adolf Hänni; Switzerland
2008	Pekka Päirvärinta; Finland	Timo Karttiala; Finland	Tim Reeves; Great Britain	Patrick Farrance; Great Britain	Ben Birchall; Great Britain	Tom Birchall; Great Britain
2009	Ben Birchall; Great Britain	Tom Birchall; Great Britain	Pekka Päirvärinta; Finland	Adolf Hänni; Switzerland	Tim Reeves; Great Britain	Tristan Reeves; Great Britain; James Neave; Great Britain
2010	Pekka Päirvärinta; Finland	Adolf Hänni; Switzerland	Tim Reeves; Great Britain	Gregory Cluze; France	Ben Birchall; Great Britain	Tom Birchall; Great Britain
2011	Pekka Päirvärinta; Finland	Adolf Hänni; Switzerland	Ben Birchall; Great Britain	Tom Birchall; Great Britain	Kurt Hock; Germany	Enrico Becker; Germany.
2012	Tim Reeves; Great Britain	Ashley Hawes; Great Britain	Jörg Steinhausen; Germany	Gregory Cluze; France	Ben Birchall; Great Britain	Tom Birchall; Great Britain
2013	Pekka Päirvärinta; Finland	Adolf Hänni; Switzerland	Ben Birchall; Great Britain	Tom Birchall; Great Britain	Jörg Steinhausen; Germany	Gregory Cluze; France; Ashley Hawes; Great Britain
2014	Tim Reeves; Great Britain	Gregory Cluze; France	Ben Birchall; Great Britain	Tom Birchall; Great Britain	Uwe Gürck; Germany	Manfred Welchselberger; Austria
2015	Bennie Streuer; Netherlands	Geert Koerts; Netherlands	Tim Reeves; Great Britain	Gregory Cluze; France	Pekka Päirvärinta; Finland	Kirsi Kainulainen; Finland
2016	Pekka Päirvärinta; Finland	Kirsi Kainulainen; Finland	Tim Reeves; Great Britain	Gregory Cluze; France	Sebastien Delannoy; France	Kevin Rousseau; France
2017	Ben Birchall; Great Britain	Tom Birchall; Great Britain	Pekka Päirvärinta; Finland	Kirsi Kainulainen; Finland	John Holden; Great Britain	Mark Wilkes; Great Britain
2018	Ben Birchall; Great Britain	Tom Birchall; Great Britain	Pekka Päirvärinta; Finland	Jussi Veräväinen; Finland	Tim Reeves; Great Britain	Mark Wilkes; Great Britain
2019	Tim Reeves; Great Britain	Mark Wilkes; Great Britain	Pekka Päirvärinta; Finland	Jussi Veräväinen; Finland	Ben Birchall; Great Britain	Tom Birchall; Great Britain
2021	Markus Schlosser; Switzerland	Marcel Fries; Switzerland	Todd Ellis; Great Britain	Emmanuelle Clément; France	Pekka Päirvärinta; Finland	Ilse de Haas; Netherlands
2022	Todd Ellis; Great Britain	Emmanuelle Clément; France	Markus Schlosser; Switzerland	Marcel Fries; Switzerland	Stephen Kershaw; Great Britain	Ryan Charlwood; Great Britain
2023	Todd Ellis; Great Britain	Emmanuelle Clément; France	Ben Birchall; Great Britain	Tom Birchall; Great Britain	Stephen Kershaw; Great Britain	Ryan Charlwood; Great Britain
