= 1991 United States motorcycle Grand Prix =

Motorcycle race

1991 United States Grand Prix
Race details
- Race 3 of 15 races in the 1991 Grand Prix motorcycle racing season
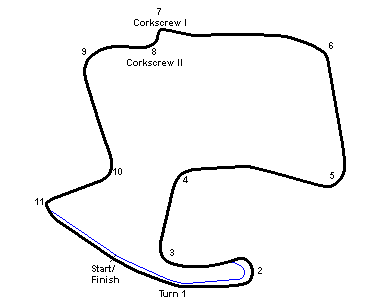
- Date: April 21, 1991
- Official name: United States International Grand Prix
- Location: Laguna Seca Raceway
- Course: Permanent racing facility; 3.520 km (2.187 mi)

500cc
Pole position
Rider	(United States) Wayne Rainey	Yamaha
Time	1:26.464	
Fastest lap
Rider	(United States) Wayne Rainey	Yamaha
Time	1:27.040	
Podium
First	(United States) Wayne Rainey	Yamaha
Second	(Australia) Mick Doohan	Honda
Third	(United States) Kevin Schwantz	Suzuki

250cc
Pole position
Rider	(Italy) Luca Cadalora	Honda
Time	1:29.030	
Fastest lap
Rider	(Italy) Luca Cadalora	Honda
Time	1:28.912	
Podium
First	(Italy) Luca Cadalora	Honda
Second	(Netherlands) Wilco Zeelenberg	Honda
Third	(Italy) Loris Reggiani	Honda

Sidecar (B2A)
Pole position
Rider	(France) Alain Michel	Krauser
Passenger	(United Kingdom) Simon Birchall	
Time	1:32.023	
Fastest lap
Rider	(France) Alain Michel	Krauser
Passenger	(United Kingdom) Simon Birchall	
Time	1:32.212	
Podium
First rider	(United Kingdom) Steve Webster	Krauser
First passenger	(United Kingdom) Gavin Simmons	
Second rider	(France) Alain Michel	Krauser
Second passenger	(United Kingdom) Simon Birchall	
Third rider	(United Kingdom) Darren Dixon	LCR-Krauser
Third passenger	(United Kingdom) Sean Dixon	

The 1991 United States Motorcycle Grand Prix was the third round of the 1991 FIM Grand Prix motorcycle roadracing season, held on the weekend of April 19–21, 1991 at Laguna Seca Raceway. This event featured no fewer than four American riders on competitive equipment, plus two more on B-level machines, during the era of U.S. domination.

== 500 cc race report ==
QUALIFYING -- Kevin Schwantz wasn't getting the drive he wanted out of the corners in practice on his Suzuki RGVr500. "Rear wheel grip is definitely our biggest shortcoming. We're trying different combinations of raising and lowering the front and rear ends of the bike," Schwantz commented. He ended third-fastest in qualifying, later joking: "'The easiest way to correct our problem is to steer the front wheel in the direction of the slide."

Australian Mick Doohan, Honda's number one man, encountered front-end difficulties while trying to secure a decent grid positive for the race. "I'll lay it in and it wants to run wide. I can't get it on a tight enough line," Doohan complained. Mick's race-day plan was to gear the machine down, so as to better allow the power of his NSR500 to turn the bike by drifting the rear Michelin.

Four-time World Champion Eddie Lawson told reporters he was spending a lot of time supporting his Cagiva on his knee because his front end was pushing fairly often. Lawson continued to adjust settings and qualified his Italian machine just behind Doohan.

Keen attention was paid to reigning 250cc champion John Kocinski, who was race-favorite Wayne Rainey's new teammate on a 500 at Marlboro Roberts Yamaha. He hustled his bike around Laguna less than one-tenth of a second slower than Rainey in practice. "The knowledge of riding the 250 doesn't pertain to riding a 500 - it's a totally different animal," explained Kocinski. "You've got a lot more braking to worry about and the acceleration areas are a lot different. You've got a slower apex speed, a much faster exit and a faster entrance too, so everything's got to change." Kocinski's fourth and third place finishes in the opening races of the season indicated that he wouldn't have much trouble transitioning to the more powerful machine, though. And like Rainey, he considered Laguna his domain.

As expected, Rainey qualified ahead of Kocinski on pole position. "You've got to attack this race track. Bike set-up is critical here and some of the other guys had problems," Rainey observed. Less than one second covered 1st through 5th places on the starting grid.

RACE—For the main event Schwantz donned an Arai helmet custom painted in army camouflage as his personal tribute to the U.S. troops who risked their lives for operation Desert Storm. The rear of the helmet featured a caricature nicknaming him "Stormin' Kevin Schwantzkopf" in a nod to American general Norman Schwarzkopf.

After the green light Schwantz and Rainey touched going over the turn one crest. Schwantz dove into the turn two hairpin first, followed closely by Rainey and Doohan. Rainey slipped inside Schwantz at the entrance to turn three. Schwantz changed his line to put the Suzuki side-by-side with Rainey heading toward turn four but Wayne had already begun to stretch a lead as they powered through the infield. Through the Corkscrew the order was Rainey, Schwantz, Doohan, Kocinski, Lawson and Wayne Gardner. Doohan had a problem coming down the hill and lost a few places. One lap later Rainey set the fastest time of the race, working his Dunlop tires to the limit, getting sideways out of the turn two, and pulling away steadily.

Kocinski soon settled down to low 1:27 times that rivaled his teammate's but didn't get by Schwantz into second place until the end of lap 5, squeezing him out on the brakes going into the turn eleven kink before the front straight. Two laps later, perhaps a bit too eager to close the gap to Rainey, Kocinski highsided out of the hairpin. Unhurt, he attempted to rejoin the race. "I got it started again but it didn't sound too good," Kocinski lamented. "I think it may have got some dirt in the motor so there was no use going on."

Schwantz inherited second place with Mick Doohan snapping at his heels after recovering from his miserable first lap. Doohan's Michelins began spinning on lap 4, so his lines were quite different from Schwantz's, who was great on the brakes but still had no drive.

"It was obvious that I was slowing him down," Schwantz said later. "Every time I looked back I just saw a big number three, I couldn't see any sky or anything. I ran as fast as I could but when the front started chattering I had to let him by." Doohan took over second on lap 21. By this time Rainey had an insurmountable lead so Mick held his Honda steady in second with Schwantz bringing the Suzuki in a comfortable third.

The scrap for fourth place was lively as Jean-Philippe Ruggia, Gardner, Lawson, and his Cagiva teammate Alexandre Barros interchanged positions several times in a four-man freight train. Ruggia finally pulled ahead of the group with Lawson finishing fifth. Barros chased Lawson home, with Gardner charging across the line in seventh place after a brief off-track excursion in turn six where he had crashed twice before in the previous two years. Juan Garriga, Adrien Morillas, and Didier de Radiguès rounded out the top ten.

Salinas-native Doug Chandler parked his Roberts B-Team Yamaha early in the race due to mechanical problems.

According to Michael Scott, Kocinski was so upset after his crash that he drove away from the track recklessly and refused to pull over when stopped by a policeman; he was arrested and sentenced to community service.

== 500 cc classification ==
Pos.	Rider	Team	Manufacturer	Laps	Time	Grid	Points
1	(United States) Wayne Rainey	Marlboro Team Roberts	Yamaha	35	51:19.361	1	20
2	(Australia) Mick Doohan	Rothmans Honda Team	Honda	35	+6.974	4	17
3	(United States) Kevin Schwantz	Lucky Strike Suzuki	Suzuki	35	+16.603	3	15
4	(France) Jean-Philippe Ruggia	Sonauto Yamaha Mobil 1	Yamaha	35	+19.931	10	13
5	(United States) Eddie Lawson	Cagiva Corse	Cagiva	35	+21.851	5	11
6	(Brazil) Alex Barros	Cagiva Corse	Cagiva	35	+25.091	7	10
7	(Australia) Wayne Gardner	Rothmans Honda Team	Honda	35	+35.069	6	9
8	(Spain) Juan Garriga	Ducados Yamaha	Yamaha	35	+43.188	9	8
9	(France) Adrien Morillas	Sonauto Yamaha Mobil 1	Yamaha	35	+53.613	8	7
10	(Belgium) Didier de Radiguès	Lucky Strike Suzuki	Suzuki	35	+1:03.059	13	6
11	(United States) Rich Oliver	Marlboro Team Roberts	Yamaha	34	+1 lap	14	5
12	(South Africa) Robbie Petersen	Marlboro Team Roberts	Yamaha	34	+1 lap	15	4
13	(Republic of Ireland) Eddie Laycock	Millar Racing	Yamaha	34	+1 lap		3
14	(Netherlands) Cees Doorakkers	HEK-Baumachines	Honda	32	+3 laps		2
15	(Switzerland) Niggi Schmassman	Schmassman Technotron	Honda	31	+4 laps		1
Ret	(United States) Doug Chandler	Roberts B Team	Yamaha	22	Retired	11	
Ret	(Spain) Sito Pons	Campsa Honda Team	Honda	10	Retired	12	
Ret	(United States) John Kocinski	Marlboro Team Roberts	Yamaha	6	Retired	2	

== 250 cc classification ==
Pos	Rider	Manufacturer	Laps	Time	Grid	Points
1	(Italy) Luca Cadalora	Honda	30	45:07.590	1	20
2	(Netherlands) Wilco Zeelenberg	Honda	30	+6.074	4	17
3	(Italy) Loris Reggiani	Aprilia	30	+15.044	2	15
4	(Spain) Carlos Cardús	Honda	30	+19.352	5	13
5	(Japan) Masahiro Shimizu	Honda	30	+25.933	9	11
6	(Austria) Andreas Preining	Aprilia	30	+38.725	8	10
7	(Germany) Martin Wimmer	Suzuki	30	+50.153	3	9
8	(Germany) Helmut Bradl	Honda	30	+53.263	6	8
9	(Spain) Àlex Crivillé	Honda	30	+59.804	11	7
10	(Germany) Jochen Schmid	Honda	30	+1:03.512	12	6
11	(France) Jean-Pierre Jeandat	Honda	30	+1:18.138		5
12	(Venezuela) Carlos Lavado	Yamaha	30	+1:25.047	10	4
13	(Italy) Doriano Romboni	Honda	30	+1:29.149		3
14	(Germany) Harald Eckl	Aprilia	30	+1:29.756	14	2
15	(Germany) Stefan Prein	Honda	30	+1:37.767		1
16	(United States) Jim Filice	Yamaha	30	+1:39.633	15	
17	(Switzerland) Bernard Hänggeli	Aprilia	30	+1:40.754		
18	(Switzerland) Urs Jucker	Yamaha	30	+1:46.428		
19	(Netherlands) Leon van der Heyden	Honda	30	+1:50.358		
20	(Spain) Jaime Mariano	Aprilia	30	+2:03.170		
21	(United States) Nick Ienatsch	Yamaha	30	+2:18.506		
22	(United States) Chris D'Aluisio	Yamaha	30	+2:22.648		
23	(United States) Rick Kirk	Yamaha	30	+2:32.444		
24	(Italy) Corrado Catalano	Honda	30	+2:38.468		
25	(Canada) Jon Cornwell	Yamaha	30	+2:50.132		
26	(United States) Mike Sullivan	Yamaha	29	+1 lap		
27	(United Kingdom) Ian Newton	Yamaha	28	+2 laps		
Ret	(Italy) Pierfrancesco Chili	Aprilia	24	Retired	7	
Ret	(Spain) Alberto Puig	Yamaha	17	Retired		
Ret	(France) Frédéric Protat	Aprilia	16	Retired		
Ret	(United Kingdom) Kevin Mitchell	Yamaha	15	Retired		
Ret	(United States) Allan Scott	Yamaha	10	Retired		
Ret	(Canada) Rick Tripodi	Yamaha	7	Retired		
Ret	(Italy) Paolo Casoli	Yamaha	1	Retired	13	

== Sidecar classification ==
Pos	Rider	Passenger	Manufacturer	Laps	Time/Retired	Grid	Points
1	(United Kingdom) Steve Webster	(United Kingdom) Gavin Simmons	Krauser	30	47:03.220	2	20
2	(France) Alain Michel	(United Kingdom) Simon Birchall	Krauser	30	+9.465	1	17
3	(United Kingdom) Darren Dixon	(United Kingdom) Sean Dixon	LCR-Krauser	30	+29.100	5	15
4	(Switzerland) Rolf Biland	(Switzerland) Kurt Waltisperg	Krauser	30	+32.018	4	13
5	(Switzerland) Markus Egloff	(Switzerland) Urs Egloff	Yamaha	30	+40.265	8	11
6	(United Kingdom) Steve Abbott	(United Kingdom) Shaun Smith	LCR-Krauser	30	+43.759	6	10
7	(Germany) Ralph Bohnhorst	(Germany) Bruno Hiller	LCR	30	+53.794	10	9
8	(Switzerland) Paul Güdel	(Switzerland) Charly Güdel	LCR-Krauser	30	+1:17.234	11	8
9	(Switzerland) René Progin	(United Kingdom) Gary Irlam	LCR	30	+1:26.511	9	7
10	(Japan) Masato Kumano	(Germany) Eckhart Rösinger	Yamaha	30	+1:26.781	13	6
11	(United Kingdom) Barry Brindley	(United Kingdom) Grahame Rose	LCR-Yamaha	29	+1 lap	12	5
12	(Germany) Frank Voigt	(Germany) Holger Voigt	Schuh-Spezial	28	+2 laps		4
13	(Switzerland) Alfred Zurbrügg	(Switzerland) Martin Zurbrügg	Yamaha	27	+3 laps	15	3
Ret	(United Kingdom) Barry Smith	(United Kingdom) David Smith	Windle-ADM	23	Retired		
Ret	(Netherlands) Theo van Kempen	(Netherlands) Jan Kuyt	LCR-Krauser	20	Retired		
Ret	(United Kingdom) Tony Baker	(United Kingdom) Simon Prior	LCR-Krauser	18	Retired		
Ret	(United Kingdom) Derek Brindley	(United Kingdom) Nick Roche	LCR-Krauser	15	Retired	14	
Ret	(Netherlands) Egbert Streuer	(United Kingdom) Peter Essaff	LCR-Yamaha	10	Retired	3	
Ret	(Japan) Yoshisada Kumagaya	(United Kingdom) Bryan Houghton	Krauser	9	Retired	7	
Ret	(Germany) Werner Kraus	(Germany) Thomas Schröder	ADM	9	Retired		
Ret	(United Kingdom) Gary Thomas	(United States) Gary Twenstrup	Krauser	3	Retired		

Previous race: 1991 Australian Grand Prix	FIM Grand Prix World Championship; 1991 season	Next race: 1991 Spanish Grand Prix
Previous race: 1990 United States Grand Prix	United States Grand Prix	Next race: 1993 United States Grand Prix
