= 1988 British motorcycle Grand Prix =

(United Kingdom) 1988 British Grand Prix
Race details
- Race 12 of 15 races in the 1988 Grand Prix motorcycle racing season
- Date: 7 August 1988
- Official name: Shell Oils British Motorcycle Grand Prix
- Location: Donington Park
- Course: Permanent racing facility; 4.020 km (2.498 mi)

500cc
Pole position
Rider	(Australia) Wayne Gardner	Honda
Time	1:35.090	
Fastest lap
Rider	(France) Christian Sarron	Yamaha
Time	1:36.210	
Podium
First	(United States) Wayne Rainey	Yamaha
Second	(Australia) Wayne Gardner	Honda
Third	(France) Christian Sarron	Yamaha

250cc
Pole position
Rider	(Spain) Juan Garriga	Yamaha
Fastest lap
Rider	(Spain) Juan Garriga	Yamaha
Time	1:38.870	
Podium
First	(Italy) Luca Cadalora	Yamaha
Second	(France) Dominique Sarron	Honda
Third	(Spain) Juan Garriga	Yamaha

125cc
Pole position
Rider	(Italy) Ezio Gianola	Honda
Fastest lap
Rider	(Italy) Ezio Gianola	Honda
Podium
First	(Italy) Ezio Gianola	Honda
Second	(Spain) Jorge Martínez	Derbi
Third	(Italy) Domenico Brigaglia	Gazzaniga-Rotax

Sidecar (B2A)
Pole position
Rider	(Switzerland) Rolf Biland	LCR-Krauser
Passenger	(Switzerland) Kurt Waltisperg	
Fastest lap
Rider	(Switzerland) Rolf Biland	LCR-Krauser
Passenger	(Switzerland) Kurt Waltisperg	
Podium
First rider	(United Kingdom) Steve Webster	LCR-Krauser
First passenger	(United Kingdom) Tony Hewitt	
Second rider	(Switzerland) Rolf Biland	LCR-Krauser
Second passenger	(Switzerland) Kurt Waltisperg	
Third rider	(France) Alain Michel	LCR-Krauser
Third passenger	(France) Jean-Marc Fresc	

The 1988 British motorcycle Grand Prix was the twelfth round of the 1988 Grand Prix motorcycle racing season. It took place on the weekend of 5–7 August 1988 at Donington Park.

== 500 cc race report ==
The front row: Wayne Gardner, Eddie Lawson, Christian Sarron, Niall Mackenzie and Wayne Rainey.

Rainey and Mackenzie get a good launch, and through the first turn it's Rainey and he's opening a gap the field. Rainey is using carbon fiber brakes for the first time, which had only been tested and not raced on.

Kevin Schwantz is in around 8th place and tries to pass two or three riders simultaneously at the chicane, but crashes into Ron Haslam and causes a bottleneck. Haslam struggles to get out of the gravel and back into the race, and Schwantz is out with a broken kneecap. Marco Papa highsides out of the race.

Finishing the first lap it's Rainey, then a gap to Gardner, Sarron, and Mackenzie. Randy Mamola and Norihiko Fujiwara come together at the hairpin, but stay up.

Rainey is maintaining a gap, and Gardner makes a mistake at the chicane and lets Sarron and Mackenzie through, but he's soon back to 2nd. Mamola is sliding the rear and waving to the crowd.

On the last lap, McElnea highsides coming out of the chicane.

Rainey wins his first premier-class GP.

== 500 cc classification ==
Pos.	Rider	Team	Manufacturer	Time/Retired	Points
1	(United States) Wayne Rainey	Team Lucky Strike Roberts	Yamaha	49:33.670	20
2	(Australia) Wayne Gardner	Rothmans Honda Team	Honda	+6.970	17
3	(France) Christian Sarron	Sonauto Gauloises Blondes Yamaha Mobil 1	Yamaha	+8.780	15
4	(United Kingdom) Niall Mackenzie	Team HRC	Honda	+11.840	13
5	(Australia) Kevin Magee	Team Lucky Strike Roberts	Yamaha	+36.750	11
6	(United States) Eddie Lawson	Marlboro Yamaha Team Agostini	Yamaha	+40.970	10
7	(Belgium) Didier de Radiguès	Marlboro Yamaha Team Agostini	Yamaha	+51.360	9
8	(Italy) Pierfrancesco Chili	HB Honda Gallina Team	Honda	+51.810	8
9	(United Kingdom) Roger Burnett	Racing Team Katayama	Honda	+52.390	7
10	(Japan) Tadahiko Taira	Tech 21	Yamaha	+1:21.840	6
11	(United States) Randy Mamola	Cagiva Corse	Cagiva	+1:32.450	5
12	(Japan) Norihiko Fujiwara	Lucky Strike Yamaha	Yamaha	+1 Lap	4
13	(United States) Mike Baldwin	Racing Team Katayama	Honda	+1 Lap	3
14	(United Kingdom) Ron Haslam	Team ROC Elf Honda	Elf Honda	+1 Lap	2
15	(Italy) Fabio Biliotti	Team Amoranto	Honda	+1 Lap	1
16	(France) Patrick Igoa	Sonauto Gauloises Blondes Yamaha Mobil 1	Yamaha	+1 Lap	
17	(Republic of Ireland) Eddie Laycock	Millar Racing	Honda	+1 Lap	
18	(San Marino) Fabio Barchitta	Racing Team Katayama	Honda	+1 Lap	
19	(Spain) Daniel Amatriain	Ducados Lotus Guarz	Honda	+1 Lap	
20	(Switzerland) Marco Gentile	Fior Marlboro	Fior	+1 Lap	
21	(United Kingdom) Dave Leach		Suzuki	+1 Lap	
22	(Netherlands) Maarten Duyzers	HDJ International	Honda	+1 Lap	
23	(United Kingdom) Simon Buckmaster		Honda	+1 Lap	
24	(Netherlands) Kees van der Endt	Autobedrijf Koens	Honda	+1 Lap	
25	(Switzerland) Nicholas Schmassman	FMS	Honda	+1 Lap	
Ret	(Luxembourg) Andreas Leuthe		Suzuki	Retirement	
Ret	(France) Rachel Nicotte	PVI Racing	Honda	Retirement	
Ret	(United Kingdom) Darren Dixon		Suzuki	Retirement	
Ret	(Switzerland) Bruno Kneubühler	Romer Racing Suisse	Honda	Retirement	
Ret	(United Kingdom) Rob McElnea	Suzuki Pepsi Cola	Suzuki	Retirement	
Ret	(Switzerland) Wolfgang von Muralt		Suzuki	Retirement	
Ret	(France) Raymond Roche	Cagiva Corse	Cagiva	Retirement	
Ret	(United Kingdom) Steve Spray		Suzuki	Retirement	
Ret	(United States) Kevin Schwantz	Suzuki Pepsi Cola	Suzuki	Retirement	
DNS	(Italy) Alessandro Valesi	Team Iberia	Honda	Did not start	
DNS	(Italy) Marco Papa	Team Greco	Honda	Did not start	
DNQ	(United Kingdom) Steve Manley	Gateford Motors	Suzuki	Did not qualify	
DNQ	(United Kingdom) Ian Pratt		Suzuki	Did not qualify	
DNQ	(Netherlands) Johan Ten Napel		Suzuki	Did not qualify	
DNQ	(Denmark) Claus Wulff		Honda	Did not qualify	
DNQ	(Argentina) Rene Zanatta		Paton	Did not qualify	

Previous race: 1988 French Grand Prix	FIM Grand Prix World Championship; 1988 season	Next race: 1988 Swedish Grand Prix
Previous race: 1987 British motorcycle Grand Prix	British Grand Prix	Next race: 1989 British Grand Prix
