= 2021 Sidecar World Championship =

The 2021 Santander Salt FIM Sidecar World Championship was the 72nd season of the Sidecar World Championship. The championship was won by Markus Schlosser and Marcel Fries of Switzerland. The season was contested across seven rounds, six rounds consisting of two races, and the final round in Estoril with three races.

Tim Reeves and Mark Wilkes entered the season as the reigning Driver and Passenger Sidecar World Champions respectively having won the championship in 2019. The 2020 Sidecar World Championship was cancelled due to the COVID-19 pandemic.

== Entries ==
The following teams and riders will be competing in the 2021 World Championship.

Teams and Riders due to compete in the 2021 World Championship
Team	Chassis	Engine	No.	Rider	Rounds	Passenger	Rounds
(United Kingdom) AMR	Adolf RS	Yamaha	25	(United Kingdom) Matt Maclaurin		(United Kingdom) Adrian Hope	
(Netherlands) Drugsadvies Sidecarshop Racing	LCR	Yamaha	2	(Netherlands) Kees Endeveld		(Germany) Hendrik Crome	
(France) Team FB Superside	LCR	Yamaha	32	(France) Franck Barbier		(France) Mickael Rigondeau	
(United Kingdom) Team SLR	LCR	Yamaha	72	(United Kingdom) Scott Lawrie		(Netherlands) Ilse de Haas	
(United Kingdom) Cable Racing L&W Contractors Sidecar Team	LCR	Yamaha	112	(United Kingdom) Kevin Cable		(United Kingdom) Kyle Masters	
(United Kingdom) Kershaw Racing	LCR	Yamaha	29	(United Kingdom) Stephen Kershaw		(United Kingdom) Ryan Charlwood	
(Austria) MRSC Gunskirchen	LCR	Yamaha	11	(Austria) Peter Kimeswenger		(Germany) Kevin Kölsch	
(United Kingdom) Dave Holden Racing	LCR	Yamaha	95	(United Kingdom) Lewis Blackstock		(United Kingdom) Patrick Rosney	
(United Kingdom) Santander Salt	LCR	Yamaha	6	(United Kingdom) Todd Ellis		(United Kingdom) Charlie 'Chaz' Richardson	
(France) Team Gallerne	RCN	Kawasaki	7	(France) Philippe Gallerne		(France) Yann Druel	
(United Kingdom) Holden Racing	ARS	Yamaha	3	(United Kingdom) John Holden		(United Kingdom) Jason Pitt	
(France) FHC Competition	LCR	Yamaha	78	(France) Hugo Fretay		(Spain) Joaquim Fenoy Casas	
(Germany) Bonovo Action by MGM	Adolf RS	Yamaha	21	(Netherlands) Bennie Streuer		(France) Emmanuelle Clément	
(Germany) Bonovo Action by MGM	Adolf RS	Yamaha	35	(Germany) Josef Sattler		(Germany) Luca Schmidt	
(Germany) Bonovo Action by MGM	Adolf RS	Yamaha	77	(United Kingdom) Tim Reeves		(France) Kevin Rousseau	
(Switzerland) Gustoil Sidecar Racing Team	LCR	Yamaha	3	(Switzerland) Markus Schlosser		(Switzerland) Marcel Fries	
(Switzerland) Gustoil Sidecar Racing Team	LCR	Yamaha	41	(Switzerland) Lukas Wyssen		(Switzerland) Thomas Hofer	
(Slovenia) Remse Racing	Adolf RS	Yamaha	55	(Slovenia) Janez Remse		(Austria) Manfred Wechselberger	
(France) Perillat and Peugeot Racing Team	LCR	Yamaha	74	(France) Ted Peugeot		(France) Vincent Peugeot	

=== Team and Rider Changes ===
Superbike World Championship team, Bonovo Action by MGM Racing, will be making its Sidecar World Championship debut in 2021, fielding three bikes run by eight times World Champion Tim Reeves with passenger Kevin Rousseau; 2015 World Champion Bennie Streuer with new passenger, Emmanuel Clement and former Internationalen Deutschen Motorradmeisterschaft/Interessengemeinschaft Gespannrennen (IDM/IGG) Sidecar champion Josef Sattler with passenger Luca Schmidt.

Other teams scheduled to make their World Championship debut include AMR, Cable Racing L&W Contractors Sidecar Team, 2020 British F1 Sidecar Championship winning team, Kershaw Racing and 2020 International Sidecar SuperPrix winners Todd Ellis and Charlie 'Chaz' Richardson of Santander Salt.

Scott Lawrie is due to return to the championship in 2021 with former Bennie Streuer passenger, Ilse de Haas.

== Calendar ==
The 2021 calendar consisted of 7 rounds, each round consisting of 2 races of equal length.

Round	Date	Country	Circuit
1	11-12 June	France	Circuit Bugatti, Le Mans
2	26-27 June	Hungary	Pannónia-Ring, Ostffyasszonyfa
3	3-4 July	England	Donington Park, Castle Donington
4	24-25 July	Netherlands	TT Circuit Assen, Assen
5	21-22 July	Croatia	Automotodrom Grobnik, Rijeka
6	2-3 October	Germany	Motorsport Arena Oschersleben, Oschersleben
7	29-31 October	Portugal	Circuito do Estoril, Estoril

The French round in Le Mans was part of the 2021 24 Heures Motos event with the FIM Endurance World Championship. The British (Donington Park) and Dutch rounds was part of the United Kingdom and Netherlands FIM Superbike World Championship events. The Second British round initially scheduled to take place from 15 to 17 October at Brands Hatch was to be part of the British Superbike finale event before it was cancelled. The Racing Commission made the decision to award double points for the final two races of the season to be held in Estoril on 29–31 October.

=== Calendar changes due to the COVID-19 pandemic ===
The provisional 2021 season calendar was announced on 7 January 2021, with 8 rounds scheduled. This included two rounds with the FIM Endurance World Championship, the 24 Heures Motos and Bol d'Or events, an unconfirmed round on 23–25 April, but not the two Superbike World Championship events. On 9 February 2021 it was announced that the World Sidecar Championship would no longer be part of the 2021 Bol d'Or event due to a lack of sufficient track time and facilities as a result of the COVID-19 pandemic and associated problems.

=== Calendar expansions and changes from 2019 to 2021 ===
The championship will return to Donington Park after a five-year absence. Along with Dutch round, this will be the first time since Spain 2014 that the World Sidecar Championship will be part of a Superbike World Championship round.

Similarly, the championship will return to Brands Hatch after a six-year absence, again, as part of a British Superbike event.

The Portuguese round at the Circuito do Estoril, made its debut as the final event of the 2019 championship and has been scheduled again as the final event in 2021.

The remaining four events of the 2021 calendar were all part of the 2019 championship.

== Championship changes ==
The 2020 World Championship was due to be the first organised and run by new series promoter, RKB-F1 Motorsport who was brought on by the FIM to run the World Championship after successfully running the British F1 Sidecar championship for several years. However, RKB-F1 Motorsport and the FIM were forced to cancel the 2020 World Championship due to the COVID-19 pandemic. The 2021 World Championship will be this first to be organised and run by RKB-F1 Motorsport.

=== Race Weekend Structure ===
Previously the World Championship utilised two race formats; a Gold Race that was a minimum of 70 km (43.5 mi) and maximum of 85 km (52.8 mi) in length; and a Sprint Race that was a minimum of 35 km (21.7 mi) and maximum of 45 km (28 mi) in length. Rounds would then consist of either, a single Gold Race or both a Gold Race and a Sprint Race. For the 2021 World Championship each round will consist of two races of equal length that is a minimum of 7 0 km (43.5 mi) and maximum of 85 km (52.8 mi) in length.

=== Sporting Regulations ===
The Sidecar World Championship will continue to use the MotoGP style points system, with points being awarded down to 15th place. For the final round of the 2021 World Champions the points allocated, for both races, will be multiplied by a factor of 1.5.

=== Technical Regulations ===
Although not outlawed explicitly previously, the use of a Drive-By-Wire system has been confirmed as legal for the 2021 championship.

== Season summary ==
=== Pre-season ===
A number of the teams took part in five days of pre-season testing beginning on 22 March at the Circuit du Val de Vienne in France. Several teams also organised their own private tests as well as an official RKB-F1 Motorsport organised test at the Snetterton circuit in the UK over the weekend of 10 & 11 April 2021 for British based teams unable to travel to mainland Europe because of COVID-19 travel restrictions.

On 27 March During a French Superbike Championship Sidecar race at Le Mans, Josef Sattler with stand in passenger Ilse de Haas lost the bike under braking and crashed. Sattler injuring his collarbone and ribs, de Haas suffering concussion and broken ribs also.

On 9 April 2021 at a private test organised by the Bonovo Action by MGM team at Oschersleben, Streuer/Clément crashed heavily as a result of suspected suspension failure. After initial medical assistance at the circuit, Streuer was taken by Helicopter to hospital in near by Magdeburg. It was confirmed Streuer had broken a number of vertebrae in the crash and underwent surgery three days later. Clément was thrown into the air during the impact but did not suffer any significant injuries.

== Results and standings ==
=== Races ===
Round	Location	Race	Pole position	Fastest lap	Winning Rider/Passenger	Winning team	Winning chassis/constructor	Report
1	(France) Circuit Bugatti	1	(Switzerland) Markus Schlosser / (Switzerland) Marcel Fries	(United Kingdom) Todd Ellis / (France) Emmanuelle Clément	(United Kingdom) Tim Reeves / (France) Kevin Rousseau	(Germany) Team Bonovo Action	(Switzerland) (Japan) Adolf-RS-Yamaha	Report
1	(France) Circuit Bugatti	2	(Switzerland) Markus Schlosser / (Switzerland) Marcel Fries	(Switzerland) Markus Schlosser / (Switzerland) Marcel Fries	(Switzerland) Markus Schlosser / (Switzerland) Marcel Fries	(Switzerland) Gustoil Sidecar Racing Team	(Switzerland) (Japan) LCR-Yamaha	Report
2	(Hungary) Pannónia-Ring	1	(Switzerland) Markus Schlosser / (Switzerland) Marcel Fries	(Switzerland) Markus Schlosser / (Switzerland) Marcel Fries	(Switzerland) Markus Schlosser / (Switzerland) Marcel Fries	(Switzerland) Gustoil Sidecar Racing Team	(Switzerland) (Japan) LCR-Yamaha	Report
2	(Hungary) Pannónia-Ring	2	(Switzerland) Markus Schlosser / (Switzerland) Marcel Fries	(United Kingdom) Tim Reeves / (France) Kevin Rousseau	(United Kingdom) Tim Reeves / (France) Kevin Rousseau	(Germany) Team Bonovo Action	(Switzerland) (Japan) Adolf-RS-Yamaha	Report
3	(United Kingdom) Donington Park	1	(United Kingdom) Todd Ellis / (France) Emmanuelle Clément	(United Kingdom) Tim Reeves / (France) Kevin Rousseau	(United Kingdom) Todd Ellis / (France) Emmanuelle Clément	(United Kingdom) Santander Salt Sidecar Team	(Switzerland) (Japan) LCR-Yamaha	Report
3	(United Kingdom) Donington Park	2	(United Kingdom) Todd Ellis / (France) Emmanuelle Clément	(United Kingdom) Todd Ellis / (France) Emmanuelle Clément	(United Kingdom) Stephen Kershaw / (United Kingdom) Ryan Charlwood	(United Kingdom) Kershaw Racing	(Switzerland) (Japan) LCR-Yamaha	Report
4	(Netherlands) TT Circuit Assen	1	(United Kingdom) Todd Ellis / (France) Emmanuelle Clément	(Switzerland) Markus Schlosser / (Switzerland) Marcel Fries	(Switzerland) Markus Schlosser / (Switzerland) Marcel Fries	(Switzerland) Gustoil Sidecar Racing Team	(Switzerland) (Japan) LCR-Yamaha	Report
4	(Netherlands) TT Circuit Assen	2	(United Kingdom) Todd Ellis / (France) Emmanuelle Clément	(Switzerland) Markus Schlosser / (Switzerland) Marcel Fries	(Switzerland) Markus Schlosser / (Switzerland) Marcel Fries	(Switzerland) Gustoil Sidecar Racing Team	(Switzerland) (Japan) LCR-Yamaha	Report
5	(Croatia) Automotodrom Grobnik	1	(Switzerland) Markus Schlosser / (Switzerland) Marcel Fries	(United Kingdom) Todd Ellis / (France) Emmanuelle Clément	(Switzerland) Markus Schlosser / (Switzerland) Marcel Fries	(Switzerland) Gustoil Sidecar Racing Team	(Switzerland) (Japan) LCR-Yamaha	Report
5	(Croatia) Automotodrom Grobnik	2	(Switzerland) Markus Schlosser / (Switzerland) Marcel Fries	(United Kingdom) Tim Reeves / (France) Kevin Rousseau	(United Kingdom) Tim Reeves / (France) Kevin Rousseau	(Germany) Team Bonovo Action	(Switzerland) (Japan) Adolf-RS-Yamaha	Report
6	(Germany) Motorsport Arena Oschersleben	1	(Switzerland) Markus Schlosser / (Switzerland) Marcel Fries	(Switzerland) Markus Schlosser / (Switzerland) Marcel Fries	(Switzerland) Markus Schlosser / (Switzerland) Marcel Fries	(Switzerland) Gustoil Sidecar Racing Team	(Switzerland) (Japan) LCR-Yamaha	Report
6	(Germany) Motorsport Arena Oschersleben	2	(Switzerland) Markus Schlosser / (Switzerland) Marcel Fries	(Switzerland) Markus Schlosser / (Switzerland) Marcel Fries	(Switzerland) Markus Schlosser / (Switzerland) Marcel Fries	(Switzerland) Gustoil Sidecar Racing Team	(Switzerland) (Japan) LCR-Yamaha	Report
7	(Portugal) Circuito do Estoril	1	(United Kingdom) Tim Reeves / (France) Kevin Rousseau	(United Kingdom) Ben Birchall / (United Kingdom) Tom Birchall	(United Kingdom) Ben Birchall / (United Kingdom) Tom Birchall	(United Kingdom) Birchall Racing	(Switzerland) (Japan) LCR-Honda	Report
7	(Portugal) Circuito do Estoril	2	(United Kingdom) Tim Reeves / (France) Kevin Rousseau	(United Kingdom) Tim Reeves / (France) Kevin Rousseau	(Isle of Man) Harry Payne / (Isle of Man) Mark Wilkes	(Isle of Man) Kelproperties.im Team #45	(Switzerland) (Japan) Adolf-RS-Yamaha	Report
7	(Portugal) Circuito do Estoril	3	(United Kingdom) Tim Reeves / (France) Kevin Rousseau	(United Kingdom) Ben Birchall / (United Kingdom) Tom Birchall	(United Kingdom) Tim Reeves / (France) Kevin Rousseau	(Germany) Team Bonovo Action	(Switzerland) (Japan) Adolf-RS-Yamaha	Report

=== World Championship standings ===
Scoring system

Points were awarded to the top fifteen finishers. A rider had to finish the race to earn points. If a race were to be stopped with less than two-thirds of the original race distance completed, half points was to be awarded. For the final two races of the season in Estoril double points were awarded.

Position	**1st**	**2nd**	**3rd**	**4th**	**5th**	**6th**	**7th**	**8th**	**9th**	**10th**	**11th**	**12th**	**13th**	**14th**	**15th**
Points	25	20	16	13	11	10	9	8	7	6	5	4	3	2	1

=== Riders' championship ===
Pos.	Driver	Passenger	Bike	FRA (France)		HUN (Hungary)		GBR (United Kingdom)		NED (Netherlands)		CRO (Croatia)		GER (Germany)		POR (Portugal)			Pts.
Pos.	Driver	Passenger	Bike	R1	R2	R1	R2	R1	R2	R1	R2	R1	R2	R1	R2	R1	R2	R3	Pts.
1	(Switzerland) Markus Schlosser	(Switzerland) Marcel Fries	LCR-Yamaha	2	1	1	1	2	DNF	1	1	**1**	**2**	**1**	**1**	12	3	3	328
2	(United Kingdom) Todd Ellis	(France) Emmanuelle Clément	LCR-Yamaha	3	2	3	2	**1**	3	DNF	2	2	3	2	3	3	5	4	269
3	(Finland) Pekka Päivärinta	(Netherlands) Ilse de Haas	LCR-Yamaha	4	3	2	3	3	5	8	4	5	5	5	5	4	4	5	218
4	(United Kingdom) Stephen Kershaw	(United Kingdom) Ryan Charlwood	LCR-Yamaha	5	7	DNF	5	DNF	1	2	3	3	4	6	7	8	2	6	212
5	(United Kingdom) Tim Reeves	(France) Kevin Rousseau	Adolf RS-Yamaha	1	5	DNF	**DSQ**	4	2	3	DNF	DNF	1	3	2	**DNF**	**DNF**	**1**	196
6	(Switzerland) Lukas Wyssen	(Switzerland) Thomas Hofer	LCR-Yamaha	6	6	6	6			7	8	6	7	10	8	7	6	12	128
7	(Netherlands) Bennie Streuer	(Netherlands) Jeroen Remmé	Adolf RS-Yamaha							**DSQ**	DNF	4	6	4	4	2	7	7	105
8	(Isle of Man) Harry Payne	(Isle of Man) Mark Wilkes	LCR-Yamaha					8	8	5	7					6	1	DNF	96
9	(United Kingdom) Ben Birchall	(United Kingdom) Tom Birchall	LCR-Honda													1	9	2	79
10	(United Kingdom) Robb Biggs	(Netherlands) Jeroen Schmitz	LCR-Yamaha							6	5			8	11	9	8	10	78
11	(France) Claude Vinet	(France) Cyril Vinet	LCR-Yamaha	9	10														70
11	(France) Claude Vinet	(France) Damien Common	LCR-Yamaha							11	DNF								70
11	(France) Claude Vinet	(France) Melanie Farnier	LCR-Yamaha									8	9	15	13	10	10	11	70
12	(France) Ted Peugeot	(France) Vincent Peugeot	LCR-Yamaha	7	4					4	6			7	6				64
13	(Austria) Peter Kimeswenger	(Germany) Kevin Kölsch	LCR-Yamaha			7	8					7	8	11	10				46
14	(Netherlands) Kees Endeveld	(Germany) Hendrik Crome	LCR-Yamaha	8	8	5	7			DNF	9	DNS	DNF	12	DNF				45
15	(Slovenia) Janez Remše	(Austria) Manfred Wechselberger	Adolf RS-Yamaha			8	9					9	10	13	DNF				31
16	(United Kingdom) Kevin Cable	(France) Max Vasseur	LCR-Yamaha	DNF	DNF	DNF	10	11	DNF	9	10								30
16	(United Kingdom) Kevin Cable	(United Kingdom) Kyle Masters	LCR-Yamaha											14	12				30
17	(France) Stephane Gadet	(France) Clotilde Salmon	LCR-Kawasaki	11	12														30
17	(France) Stephane Gadet	(France) Valentin Pirat	LCR-Kawasaki													11	11	13	30
18	(United Kingdom) Craig Currie	(United Kingdom) Justin Sharp	LCR-Yamaha													5	DNF	8	27
19	(Germany) Josef Sattler	(Germany) Luca Schmidt	Adolf RS-Yamaha			4	4							DNS	DNS				26
20	(United Kingdom) Sam Cristie	(United Kingdom) Adam Cristie	LCR-Yamaha					7	7										20
21	(United Kingdom) Lewis Blackstock	(United Kingdom) Patrick Rosney	LCR-Yamaha					6	6										20
22	(France) Philippe Le Bail	(France) Serge Leveau	LCR-Yamaha	10	9											DNF	DNS	14	17
23	(United Kingdom) Scott Lawrie	(United Kingdom) Shelley Smithies	LCR-Yamaha											9	9				14
24	(France) Paul Leglise	(France) Sebastien Lavorel	LCR-Yamaha													DNF	DNS	9	14
25	(United Kingdom) Thomas Philip	(United Kingdom) Tom Bryant	LCR-Yamaha					DNF	4										13
26	(United Kingdom) John Holden	(United Kingdom) Jason Pitt	Adolf RS-Yamaha					DNF	9										13
27	(United Kingdom) Rupert Archer	(United Kingdom) Philip Hyde	Adolf RS-Yamaha					10	10										12
28	(France) Philippe Gallerne	(France) Yann Druel	RCN-Kawasaki	13	11														10
28	(France) Philippe Gallerne	(France) Nicholas Bidault	RCN-Kawasaki											DNF	14				10
29	(United Kingdom) George Holden	(United Kingdom) Oscar Lawrence	LCR-Suzuki					9	DNF										7
30	(France) Benjamin Luneau	(France) Nicholas Bidault	LCR-Yamaha							10	DNF								6
30	(France) Hugo Fretay	(Spain) Joaquim Fenoy Casas	LCR-Yamaha	12	DNF														4
31	(France) Franck Barbier	(France) Mickael Rigondeau	LCR-Yamaha	DNF	DNS														0
Pos.	Driver	Passenger	Bike	FRA (France)		HUN (Hungary)		GBR (United Kingdom)		NED (Netherlands)		CRO (Croatia)		GER (Germany)		POR (Portugal)			Pts.

Colour	Result
Gold	Winner
Silver	Second place
Bronze	Third place
Green	Points classification
Blue	Non-points classification
Blue	Non-classified finish (NC)
Purple	Retired, not classified (Ret)
Red	Did not qualify (DNQ)
Red	Did not pre-qualify (DNPQ)
Black	Disqualified (DSQ)
White	Did not start (DNS)
White	Withdrew (WD)
White	Race cancelled (C)
Blank	Did not practice (DNP)
Blank	Did not arrive (DNA)
Blank	Excluded (EX)

**Bold** – Pole position
Italics – Fastest lap
