= Todd Ellis (motorcyclist) =

British motorcycle racer

Todd Ellis (born 1994) is an English sidecar racer. He is two times Superside FIM World Sidecar Champion.

== Sidecar World Championship ==
In 2020, Ellis and passenger Charlie 'Chaz' Richardson won the International Sidecar SuperPrix 2020, a competition organized by the German and British federations when the FIM World Sidecar Championship 2020 was canceled due to the restrictions during the COVID-19 pandemic.

In the 2021 Sidecar World Championship Ellis placed second with French passenger Emmanuelle Clément on their LCR-Yamaha machine behind Swiss duo Marcus Schlosser and Marcel Fries.

In 2022 and 2023, Ellis and Clément won the Superside World Championship.

=== Sidecar World Championship results ===
Year	Passenger	Motorbike	1	2	3	4	5	6	7	8	9	10	11	12	13	14	15	16	Place	Points
2021	Emmanuelle Clément	LCR-Yamaha	FRA1; 3	FRA2; 2	HUN1; 3	HUN2; 2	GBR1; 1	GBR2; 3	NED1; DNF	NED2; 2	CRO1; 2	CRO2; 3	OSC1; 2	OSC2; 3	POR1; 3	POR2; 5	POR3; 4		2nd	269
2022	Emmanuelle Clément	LCR-Yamaha	FRA1; 1	FRA2; 2	NED1; 2	NED2; 1	BEL1; 1	BEL2; 1	HUN1; 1	HUN2; 2	CRO1; 1	CRO2; DNF	GBR1; 1	GBR2; 2	GER1; 1	GER2; 1	POR1; 2	POR2; 3	1st	377
2023	Emmanuelle Clément	LCR-Yamaha	GER1; 3	GER2; 4	BEL1; 1	BEL2; 2	CZE1; 4	CZE2; 1	AUT1; 5	AUT2; 1	NED1; 1	NED2; 1	OSC1; 2	OSC2; 2	POR1; 3	POR2; 3			1st	270

== British F1 Sidecar Championship ==
Ellis is three times British Champion. He won the British F1-Sidecar Championship in 2019 with passenger Charlie Richardson and in 2022 and 2023 with Emmanuelle Clément. In 2018 and 2020 Ellis placed second with passenger Charlie Richardson.

Ellis is the fifth driver to become both British Champion and World Champion in the same season. Previously, Jock Taylor achieved this with his Swedish passenger Benga Johansson in 1980, and then Steve Webster in 1987, 1988 and 2004, Tim Reeves in 2007 and Ben Birchall in 2016.

== Isle of Man TT ==
In November 2023, it was announced that Todd Ellis and Emmanuelle Clément will make their Isle of Man TT debut in 2024. During the second sidecar race of the 2024 Isle of man TT they crashed at Waterworks bringing out a red flag both riders we reported as OK afterwards.

Sporting positions
Preceded by Marcus Schlosser; With: Marcel Fries	World Sidecar Champion; 2022–2023; With: Emmanuelle Clément	Succeeded by
