= 1988 Swedish motorcycle Grand Prix =

(Sweden) 1988 Swedish Grand Prix
Race details
- Race 13 of 15 races in the 1988 Grand Prix motorcycle racing season
- Date: 14 August 1988
- Official name: Swedish TT
- Location: Scandinavian Raceway
- Course: Permanent racing facility; 4.031 km (2.505 mi)

500cc
Pole position
Rider	(United States) Eddie Lawson	Yamaha
Time	1:34.690	
Fastest lap
Rider	(United States) Eddie Lawson	Yamaha
Time	1:34.430	
Podium
First	(United States) Eddie Lawson	Yamaha
Second	(Australia) Wayne Gardner	Honda
Third	(France) Christian Sarron	Yamaha

250cc
Pole position
Rider	(Italy) Luca Cadalora	Yamaha
Time	1:38.240	
Fastest lap
Rider	(West Germany) Reinhold Roth	Honda
Time	1:38.380	
Podium
First	(Spain) Sito Pons	Honda
Second	(Spain) Juan Garriga	Yamaha
Third	(France) Dominique Sarron	Honda

125cc
Pole position
Rider	(Spain) Jorge Martínez	Derbi
Time	1:45.830	
Fastest lap
Rider	(Spain) Jorge Martínez	Derbi
Podium
First	(Spain) Jorge Martínez	Derbi
Second	(Italy) Ezio Gianola	Honda
Third	(Spain) Julián Miralles	Honda

Sidecar (B2A)
Pole position
Rider	(United Kingdom) Steve Webster	LCR-Krauser
Passenger	(United Kingdom) Tony Hewitt	
Fastest lap
Rider	(Switzerland) Rolf Biland	LCR-Krauser
Passenger	(Switzerland) Kurt Waltisperg	
Podium
First rider	(United Kingdom) Steve Webster	LCR-Krauser
First passenger	(United Kingdom) Tony Hewitt	
Second rider	(Switzerland) Rolf Biland	LCR-Krauser
Second passenger	(Switzerland) Kurt Waltisperg	
Third rider	(France) Alain Michel	LCR-Krauser
Third passenger	(France) Jean-Marc Fresc	

The 1988 Swedish motorcycle Grand Prix was the thirteenth round of the 1988 Grand Prix motorcycle racing season. It took place on the weekend of 12–14 August 1988 at the Anderstorp circuit.

== 500 cc race report ==
Eddie Lawson on pole. Wayne Rainey gets the start from Niall Mackenzie and Didier De Radiguès.

At the end of the first lap it's Rainey, Lawson, Wayne Gardner, Christian Sarron, De Radiguès, et al. Lawson passes 3 riders on the straight as if he's angry for his performance at Donington.

Lawson soon through on Rainey and gets a large lead on a group with Gardner, now in 2nd and Rainey in 3rd.

Lawson almost highsides out of first place, but keeps it together to the end. Rainey fades to 5th.

== 500cc classification ==
Pos.	Rider	Team	Manufacturer	Time/Retired	Points
1	(United States) Eddie Lawson	Marlboro Yamaha Team Agostini	Yamaha	47:59.280	20
2	(Australia) Wayne Gardner	Rothmans Honda Team	Honda	+18.040	17
3	(France) Christian Sarron	Sonauto Gauloises Blondes Yamaha Mobil 1	Yamaha	+19.340	15
4	(United Kingdom) Niall Mackenzie	Team HRC	Honda	+23.450	13
5	(United States) Wayne Rainey	Team Lucky Strike Roberts	Yamaha	+30.080	11
6	(Australia) Kevin Magee	Team Lucky Strike Roberts	Yamaha	+35.450	10
7	(Belgium) Didier de Radiguès	Marlboro Yamaha Team Agostini	Yamaha	+48.620	9
8	(United Kingdom) Roger Burnett	Racing Team Katayama	Honda	+51.160	8
9	(Italy) Pierfrancesco Chili	HB Honda Gallina Team	Honda	+53.330	7
10	(United States) Randy Mamola	Cagiva Corse	Cagiva	+59.520	6
11	(United Kingdom) Ron Haslam	Team ROC Elf Honda	Elf Honda	+1:00.010	5
12	(United States) Kevin Schwantz	Suzuki Pepsi Cola	Suzuki	+1:02.740	4
13	(United Kingdom) Rob McElnea	Suzuki Pepsi Cola	Suzuki	+1:11.590	3
14	(Japan) Tadahiko Taira	Tech 21	Yamaha	+1:22.990	2
15	(France) Raymond Roche	Cagiva Corse	Cagiva	+1 Lap	1
16	(San Marino) Fabio Barchitta	Racing Team Katayama	Honda	+1 Lap	
17	(Japan) Norihiko Fujiwara	Lucky Strike Yamaha	Yamaha	+1 Lap	
18	(Sweden) Peter Lindén	Team Honda Sweden	Honda	+1 Lap	
19	(Switzerland) Marco Gentile	Fior Marlboro	Fior	+1 Lap	
20	(Switzerland) Bruno Kneubühler	Romer Racing Suisse	Honda	+1 Lap	
21	(Sweden) Peter Sköld	Team Honda Sweden	Honda	+1 Lap	
22	(Switzerland) Wolfgang von Muralt		Suzuki	+1 Lap	
23	(United Kingdom) Simon Buckmaster		Honda	+1 Lap	
24	(Denmark) Claus Wulff		Honda	+1 Lap	
25	(Sweden) Åke Dahli		Suzuki	+1 Lap	
26	(Switzerland) Christopher Burki		Honda	+1 Lap	
27	(Sweden) Lars Johansson		Suzuki	+1 Lap	
Ret	(Switzerland) Nicholas Schmassman	FMS	Honda	Retirement	
Ret	(Netherlands) Maarten Duyzers	HDJ International	Honda	Retirement	
Ret	(Spain) Daniel Amatriain	Ducados Lotus Guarz	Honda	Retirement	
Ret	(Italy) Alessandro Valesi	Team Iberia	Honda	Retirement	
Ret	(Italy) Fabio Biliotti	Team Amoranto	Honda	Retirement	
DNS	(France) Patrick Igoa	Sonauto Gauloises Blondes Yamaha Mobil 1	Yamaha	Did not start	
DNS	(Sweden) Thomas Aronsson		Nicco Bakker	Did not start	
DNQ	(Luxembourg) Andreas Leuthe		Suzuki	Did not qualify	
DNQ	(Finland) Ari Ramo		Honda	Did not qualify	
DNQ	(Sweden) Gunnar Bruhn		Honda	Did not qualify	

Previous race: 1988 British Grand Prix	FIM Grand Prix World Championship; 1988 season	Next race: 1988 Czechoslovak Grand Prix
Previous race: 1987 Swedish Grand Prix	Swedish Grand Prix	Next race: 1989 Swedish Grand Prix
