= 1988 Czechoslovak motorcycle Grand Prix =

(Czechoslovakia) 1988 Czechoslovak Grand Prix
Race details
- Race 14 of 15 races in the 1988 Grand Prix motorcycle racing season
- Date: 28 August 1988
- Official name: Grand Prix ČSSR-Brno
- Location: Masaryk Circuit
- Course: Permanent racing facility; 5.403 km (3.357 mi)

500cc
Pole position
Rider	(Australia) Wayne Gardner	Honda
Fastest lap
Rider	(Australia) Wayne Gardner	Honda
Podium
First	(Australia) Wayne Gardner	Honda
Second	(United States) Eddie Lawson	Yamaha
Third	(United States) Wayne Rainey	Yamaha

250cc
Pole position
Rider	(France) Dominique Sarron	Honda
Fastest lap
Rider	(Spain) Juan Garriga	Yamaha
Podium
First	(Spain) Juan Garriga	Yamaha
Second	(Spain) Sito Pons	Honda
Third	(Italy) Luca Cadalora	Yamaha

125cc
Pole position
Rider	(Netherlands) Hans Spaan	Honda
Fastest lap
Rider	(Spain) Jorge Martínez	Derbi
Podium
First	(Spain) Jorge Martínez	Derbi
Second	(Spain) Julián Miralles	Honda
Third	(Netherlands) Hans Spaan	Honda

80cc
Pole position
Rider	(Spain) Jorge Martínez	Derbi
Fastest lap
Rider	(Spain) Jorge Martínez	Derbi
Podium
First	(Spain) Jorge Martínez	Derbi
Second	(Switzerland) Stefan Dörflinger	Krauser
Third	(Spain) Àlex Crivillé	Derbi

Sidecar (B2A)
Pole position
Rider	(Switzerland) Rolf Biland	LCR-Krauser
Passenger	(Switzerland) Kurt Waltisperg	
Fastest lap
Rider	(Netherlands) Egbert Streuer	LCR-Yamaha
Passenger	(Netherlands) Bernard Schnieders	
Podium
First rider	(United Kingdom) Steve Webster	LCR-Krauser
First passenger	(United Kingdom) Gavin Simmons	
Second rider	(Netherlands) Egbert Streuer	LCR-Yamaha
Second passenger	(Netherlands) Bernard Schnieders	
Third rider	(Switzerland) Markus Egloff	LCR-ADM
Third passenger	(Switzerland) Urs Egloff	

The 1988 Czechoslovak motorcycle Grand Prix was the penultimate round of the 1988 Grand Prix motorcycle racing season. It took place on the weekend of 26–28 August 1988 at the Masaryk Circuit located in Brno, Czechoslovakia.

== 500 cc race report ==
Wayne Gardner on pole. Wayne Rainey gets a good start, but Tadahiko Taira gets the first turn.

At the end of the first lap, it's Gardner, Taira, Christian Sarron, Rainey, and Eddie Lawson in 7th. Lawson needs to finish behind Gardner to win the championship.

Gardner is getting a gap, but Lawson has moved to 2nd, while Sarron highsides out.

After the race there's a dispute between Lawson and Rainey, Lawson perhaps angry that Team Roberts wasn't playing by the Yamaha team book with Rainey making 2nd place so difficult to get.

Rumors were also that Lawson and team manager Giacomo Agostini were about to split, and Lawson would be going to Rothmans Honda with Gardner.

== 500 cc classification ==
Pos.	Rider	Team	Manufacturer	Time/Retired	Points
1	(Australia) Wayne Gardner	Rothmans Honda Team	Honda	49:11.060	20
2	(United States) Eddie Lawson	Marlboro Yamaha Team Agostini	Yamaha	+1.910	17
3	(United States) Wayne Rainey	Team Lucky Strike Roberts	Yamaha	+2.480	15
4	(Italy) Pierfrancesco Chili	HB Honda Gallina Team	Honda	+15.680	13
5	(Japan) Tadahiko Taira	Tech 21	Yamaha	+19.910	11
6	(United Kingdom) Niall Mackenzie	Team HRC	Honda	+29.440	10
7	(United Kingdom) Ron Haslam	Team ROC Elf Honda	Elf Honda	+57.440	9
8	(United Kingdom) Rob McElnea	Suzuki Pepsi Cola	Suzuki	+58.240	8
9	(France) Patrick Igoa	Sonauto Gauloises Blondes Yamaha Mobil 1	Yamaha	+59.360	7
10	(San Marino) Fabio Barchitta	Racing Team Katayama	Honda	+1:45.960	6
11	(Switzerland) Marco Gentile	Fior Marlboro	Fior	+1:45.960	5
12	(Italy) Marco Papa	Team Greco	Honda	+2:00.440	4
13	(Italy) Alessandro Valesi	Team Iberia	Honda	+2:00.640	3
14	(Sweden) Peter Linden	Team Honda Sweden	Honda	+1 Lap	2
15	(Switzerland) Bruno Kneubühler	Romer Racing Suisse	Honda	+1 Lap	1
16	(Italy) Fabio Biliotti	Team Amoranto	Honda	+1 Lap	
17	(Switzerland) Wolfgang von Muralt		Suzuki	+1 Lap	
18	(Socialist Federal Republic of Yugoslavia) Silvo Habat	Fego Racing Team	Honda	+1 Lap	
19	(West Germany) Manfred Fischer	Team Hein Gericke	Honda	+1 Lap	
20	(France) Rachel Nicotte	PVI Racing	Honda	+1 Lap	
21	(Austria) Karl Truchsess		Honda	+1 Lap	
22	(Switzerland) Nicholas Schmassman	FMS	Honda	+1 Lap	
23	(Denmark) Claus Wulff		Honda	+1 Lap	
24	(Czechoslovakia) Pavol Dekánek	Wernberger Konservenfabrik	Honda	+1 Lap	
Ret	(Austria) Josef Doppler	MRC Grieskirchen	Honda	Retirement	
Ret	(France) Christian Sarron	Sonauto Gauloises Blondes Yamaha Mobil 1	Yamaha	Retirement	
Ret	(Republic of Ireland) Eddie Laycock	Millar Racing	Honda	Retirement	
Ret	(Spain) Daniel Amatriain	Ducados Lotus Guarz	Honda	Retirement	
Ret	(United Kingdom) Roger Burnett	Racing Team Katayama	Honda	Retirement	
Ret	(United States) Randy Mamola	Cagiva Corse	Cagiva	Retirement	
Ret	(Belgium) Didier de Radiguès	Marlboro Yamaha Team Agostini	Yamaha	Retirement	
Ret	(France) Raymond Roche	Cagiva Corse	Cagiva	Retirement	
Ret	(Australia) Kevin Magee	Team Lucky Strike Roberts	Yamaha	Retirement	
Ret	(United Kingdom) Simon Buckmaster		Honda	Retirement	
Ret	(United States) Kevin Schwantz	Suzuki Pepsi Cola	Suzuki	Retirement	
DNS	(Luxembourg) Andreas Leuthe		Suzuki	Did not start	
DNS	(Austria) Rudolf Zeller	MRC Kremsmunster	Manhattan	Did not start	
DNQ	(Venezuela) Larry Moreno Vacondio		Suzuki	Did not qualify	
DNQ	(Czechoslovakia) Imrich Majoroš		Suzuki	Did not qualify	
DNQ	(United Kingdom) Ian Pratt		Suzuki	Did not qualify	
DNQ	(Austria) Franz Schopf		Suzuki	Did not qualify	
DNQ	(Czechoslovakia) Marián Troliga		Suzuki	Did not qualify	
DNQ	(West Germany) Michael Wild		Suzuki	Did not qualify	
DNQ	(Netherlands) Harry Heutmekers		Suzuki	Did not qualify	
DNQ	(Czechoslovakia) Petr Hlavatka		Suzuki	Did not qualify	

Previous race: 1988 Swedish Grand Prix	FIM Grand Prix World Championship; 1988 season	Next race: 1988 Brazilian Grand Prix
Previous race: 1987 Czechoslovak Grand Prix	Czechoslovak Grand Prix	Next race: 1989 Czechoslovak Grand Prix
