= 1988 French motorcycle Grand Prix =

(France) 1988 French Grand Prix
Race details
- Race 11 of 15 races in the 1988 Grand Prix motorcycle racing season
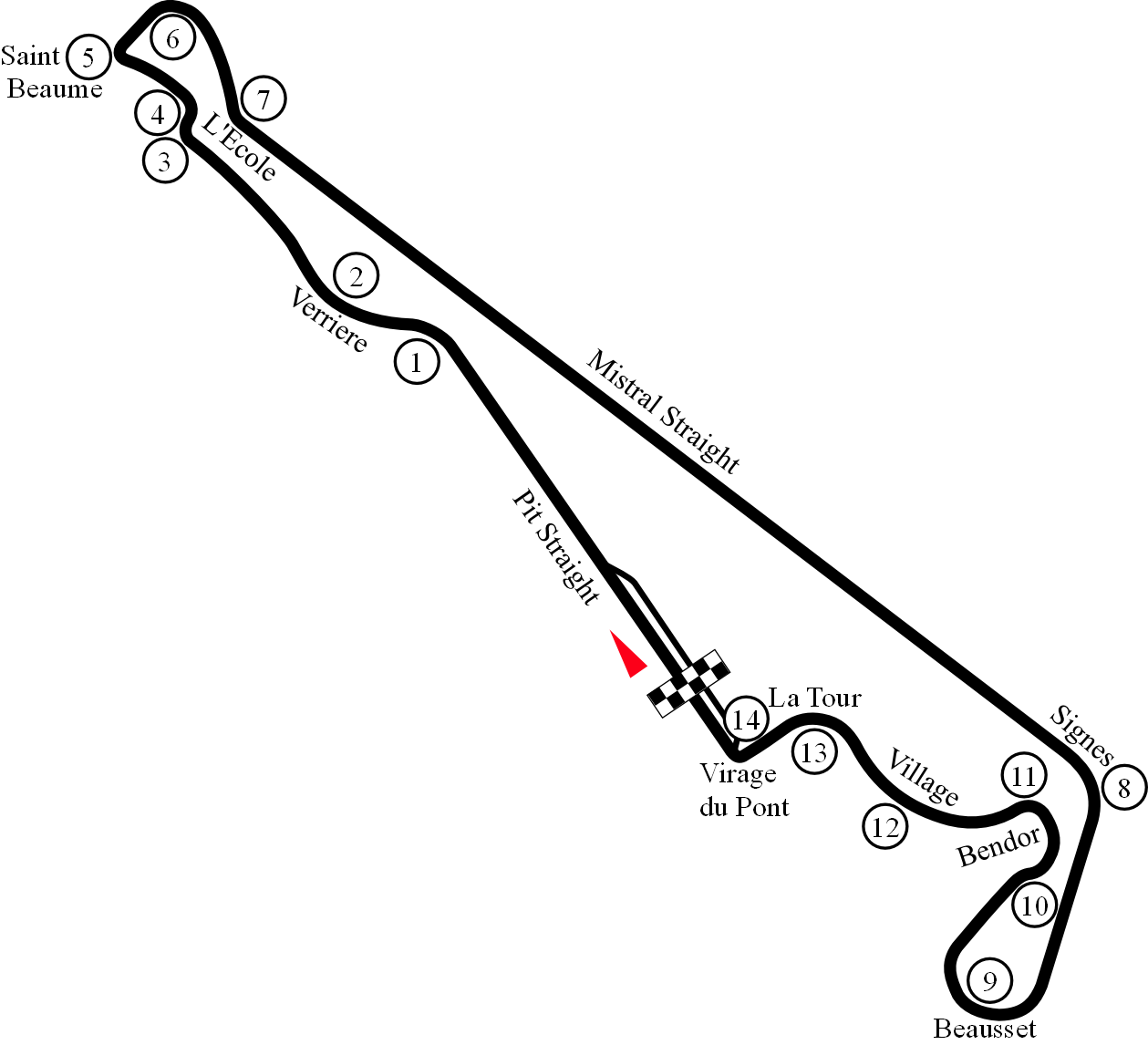
- Date: 24 July 1988
- Official name: Grand Prix de France
- Location: Circuit Paul Ricard
- Course: Permanent racing facility; 5.809 km (3.610 mi)

500cc
Pole position
Rider	(France) Christian Sarron	Yamaha
Time	1:58.810	
Fastest lap
Rider	(Australia) Wayne Gardner	Honda
Time	1:59.027	
Podium
First	(United States) Eddie Lawson	Yamaha
Second	(France) Christian Sarron	Yamaha
Third	(United States) Kevin Schwantz	Suzuki

250cc
Pole position
Rider	(France) Dominique Sarron	Honda
Time	2:04.030	
Fastest lap
Rider	(Spain) Juan Garriga	Yamaha
Time	2:03.370	
Podium
First	(Switzerland) Jacques Cornu	Honda
Second	(Spain) Sito Pons	Honda
Third	(France) Dominique Sarron	Honda

125cc
Pole position
Rider	(Italy) Ezio Gianola	Honda
Time	2:14.780	
Fastest lap
Rider	(Spain) Jorge Martínez	Derbi
Time	2:14.700	
Podium
First	(Spain) Jorge Martínez	Derbi
Second	(Italy) Ezio Gianola	Honda
Third	(Italy) Corrado Catalano	Aprilia

Sidecar (B2A)
Pole position
Rider	(Switzerland) Rolf Biland	LCR-Krauser
Passenger	(Switzerland) Kurt Waltisperg	
Fastest lap
Rider	(Switzerland) Rolf Biland	LCR-Krauser
Passenger	(Switzerland) Kurt Waltisperg	
Podium
First rider	(Switzerland) Rolf Biland	LCR-Krauser
First passenger	(Switzerland) Kurt Waltisperg	
Second rider	(United Kingdom) Steve Webster	LCR-Krauser
Second passenger	(United Kingdom) Tony Hewitt	
Third rider	(Switzerland) Markus Egloff	LCR-ADM
Third passenger	(Switzerland) Urs Egloff	

The 1988 French motorcycle Grand Prix was the eleventh round of the 1988 Grand Prix motorcycle racing season. It took place on the weekend of 22–24 July 1988 at the 5.81 km (3.61 mi) Paul Ricard Circuit.

== 500 cc race report ==
Frenchman Christian Sarron claimed his 5th pole position in a row on his Yamaha YZR500, and his last ever in 500 GP.

Like most of the mid-field, Niall Mackenzie (Honda) jumped the start and raced to the lead, but the race was allowed to continue and no penalties were handed out by race officials. On the 1.8 km long Mistral Straight for the first time Wayne Gardner used the power of his factory Rothmans Honda to shoot to the lead from Kevin Schwantz (Suzuki), Mackenzie and Wayne Rainey (Yamaha).

Gardner and pole sitter Sarron battled for the lead with Schwantz and Eddie Lawson (Yamaha), who was battling a shoulder injury suffered in the previous race in Yugoslavia only one week before and had turned to famed Austrian Willi Dungl to help him get fit to race. Gardner's Honda had the advantage on the Mistral Straight over all but Lawson's YZR500, but Lawson, Sarron and Schwantz had the advantage through the turns, though the Suzuki was clearly the slowest on the Pit and Mistral straights. The quartet gradually pulled away from Rainey, who in turn pulled away from a pack including Randy Mamola (Cagiva), Didier de Radiguès (Yamaha), Pierfrancesco Chili (Honda) and Kevin Magee (Yamaha).

Going into the last lap, Gardner had pulled out a two-second lead over the trio and looked set to win his fourth race in a row. However, going through the Courbe de Signes at the end of the Mistral his bike developed mechanical problems when a crankshaft bolt broke loose and found its way into the water pump, though he had a big enough gap over Wayne Rainey to struggle home in 4th place only 5.720 seconds behind Lawson. Gardner's breakdown allowed Lawson to win the race and extend his lead in the championship. Sarron consolidated his second place in the title race, finishing only 0.22 behind the American. In one of the closest top 3 finishes in history, Schwantz finished in 3rd place only 0.24 behind Sarron and less than half a second from winning. Schwantz came out of the final turn and knowing his bike didn't have the acceleration to pass, pulled a wheelie until after crossing the line and celebrated on the cool down lap for gaining an unexpected podium finish.

Wayne Gardner, back in the form that has seen him win the World Championship in 1987, had the consolation of setting the races fastest lap.

1988 was the final time that the French motorcycle Grand Prix would be held on the full length 5.81 km (3.61 mi) Paul Ricard circuit. When Grand Prix racing next returned to the circuit in 1991, the 3.812 km (2.369 mi) 'Club' circuit was used.

== 500 cc classification ==
Pos.	Rider	Team	Manufacturer	Time/Retired	Points
1	(United States) Eddie Lawson	Marlboro Yamaha Team Agostini	Yamaha	42:15.520	20
2	(France) Christian Sarron	Sonauto Gauloises Blondes Yamaha Mobil 1	Yamaha	+0.220	17
3	(United States) Kevin Schwantz	Suzuki Pepsi Cola	Suzuki	+0.460	15
4	(Australia) Wayne Gardner	Rothmans Honda Team	Honda	+5.720	13
5	(United States) Wayne Rainey	Team Lucky Strike Roberts	Yamaha	+17.630	11
6	(United States) Randy Mamola	Cagiva Corse	Cagiva	+27.810	10
7	(Belgium) Didier de Radiguès	Marlboro Yamaha Team Agostini	Yamaha	+30.620	9
8	(Italy) Pierfrancesco Chili	HB Honda Gallina Team	Honda	+30.870	8
9	(Australia) Kevin Magee	Team Lucky Strike Roberts	Yamaha	+35.110	7
10	(United Kingdom) Ron Haslam	Team ROC Elf Honda	Elf Honda	+35.310	6
11	(United Kingdom) Rob McElnea	Suzuki Pepsi Cola	Suzuki	+59.870	5
12	(Australia) Malcolm Campbell	Team ROC Elf Honda	Elf Honda	+1:19.040	4
13	(United States) Mike Baldwin	Racing Team Katayama	Honda	+1:42.640	3
14	(Italy) Alessandro Valesi	Team Iberia	Honda	+1:46.140	2
15	(San Marino) Fabio Barchitta	Racing Team Katayama	Honda	+2:02.540	1
16	(United Kingdom) Donnie McLeod	Racing Team Katayama	Honda	+1 Lap	
17	(Switzerland) Marco Gentile	Fior Marlboro	Fior	+1 Lap	
18	(Italy) Marco Papa	Team Greco	Honda	+1 Lap	
19	(Italy) Fabio Biliotti	Team Amoranto	Honda	+1 Lap	
20	(Germany) Manfred Fischer	Team Hein Gericke	Honda	+1 Lap	
21	(Republic of Ireland) Eddie Laycock	Millar Racing	Honda	+1 Lap	
22	(France) Claude Arciero		Honda	+1 Lap	
23	(Switzerland) Nicholas Schmassman	FMS	Honda	+1 Lap	
24	(Netherlands) Maarten Duyzers	HDJ International	Honda	+1 Lap	
Ret	(France) Patrick Igoa	Sonauto Gauloises Blondes Yamaha Mobil 1	Yamaha	Retirement	
Ret	(France) Rachel Nicotte	PVI Racing	Honda	Retirement	
Ret	(Spain) Daniel Amatriain	Ducados Lotus Guarz	Honda	Retirement	
Ret	(France) Thierry Rapicault		Fior	Retirement	
Ret	(Switzerland) Bruno Kneubühler	Romer Racing Suisse	Honda	Retirement	
Ret	(Austria) Josef Doppler	MRC Grieskirchen	Honda	Retirement	
Ret	(Switzerland) Wolfgang von Muralt		Suzuki	Retirement	
Ret	(United Kingdom) Niall Mackenzie	Team HRC	Honda	Retirement	
Ret	(Japan) Shunji Yatsushiro	Rothmans Honda Team	Honda	Retirement	
Ret	(France) Raymond Roche	Cagiva	Retirement		
Ret	(France) Jean Luc Demierre		Suzuki	Retirement	
Ret	(Italy) Vittorio Scatola	Road Racing Team Avia	Suzuki	Retirement	
DNS	(France) Eric Sabatier	Weigl Telefix Racing Team	Honda	Did not start	
DNQ	(Luxembourg) Andreas Leuthe		Suzuki	Did not qualify	
DNQ	(Venezuela) Larry Moreno Vacondio		Suzuki	Did not qualify	
DNQ	(Finland) Ari Ramo		Honda	Did not qualify	
DNQ	(France) Claude Albert		Suzuki	Did not qualify	
DNQ	(France) Patrick Leruste		Suzuki	Did not qualify	
DNQ	(France) Bernard Andrault		Honda	Did not qualify	
DNQ	(Italy) Vincenzo Cascino		Honda	Did not qualify	
DNQ	(France) Christian Polard		Honda	Did not qualify	

Previous race: 1988 Yugoslavian Grand Prix	FIM Grand Prix World Championship; 1988 season	Next race: 1988 British Grand Prix
Previous race: 1987 French Grand Prix	French motorcycle Grand Prix	Next race: 1989 French Grand Prix
