= Emmanuelle Clément =

French motorcycle racer

Emmanuelle Clément (born ~1997) is a French sidecar racer (passenger). She is a two times Superside FIM World Sidecar Champion, after winning the championship with driver Todd Ellis in 2022 and 2023. Clément is the second female sidecar world champion after Kirsi Kainulainen, who won it in 2016. She is also a two time British Sidecar Champion.

Clément is the third French sidecar racing world champion. All three of them raced with an English partner. The other two are driver Alain Michel with passenger Simon Birchall in 1990 and Grégory Cluze passenger of Tim Reeves in 2014.

== Early career ==
2017

In 2017, Clément took part in sidecar racing for the first time, when she competed at the French FSBK (Note: FSBK = France SuperBiKe) championships replacing the injured Kevin Rousseau as passenger of reigning French champion Sébastien Delannoy at the races in Nogaro, Lédenon and Pau-Arnos. In Lédenon and Pau-Arnos they won both races while in Lédenon they finished both races in second place. With his passengers Rousseau and Clément, Delannoy became French champion for the fourth time that season in the 1000cc sidecar class. Later that season, Clément also filled in as passenger with Manuel Moreau at Circuit Magny-Cours where they won the first race, and at Circuit Carole in Tremblay-en-France where they finished in second place in the second race. She also drove test and training rides with French 2016 Formula 2 Sidecar champion Estelle Leblond. (Note: Formula 1 Sidecarraces are driven with long machines or kneelers, road racing sidecars with a very low construction, which means that the driver has to sit in a kneeling position in front of the rear-mounted engine. Formula 2 Sidecar races are raced with short machines or seaters, road racing sidecars over which the driver, just like on a solo motorcycle, is seated ‘over’ the engine.)

2018

During the first round of the FSBK-F1 races, Clément drove the second race on the Circuit Bugatti in Le Mans again as passenger of Manuel Moreau, whose regular passenger, Belgian Jonathan Brichard, fell of the machine during training and broke his toe. During the third round at Magny Cours, Clément once again replaced Rousseau as passenger of reigning French champion Sébastien Delannoy; they won both races, and Delannoy became French champion for the fifth time in 2018.

== Sidecar World Championship ==
In 2019, Clément was the regular passenger of French driver Paul Leglise. They finished in ninth place in the World Championships and eleventh in the FSBK-F1 Championship in France.

In 2019, Clément was also the regular passenger of the British driver Scott Lawrie in the 1000 cc sidecar class of the German IDM Championship. (Note: IDM = Internationalen Deutschen Motorradmeisterschaft (en: International German Motorcycle Championship)) They finished eleventh.

In the corona season 2020, Clément was the regular passenger of the Finnish five-time world champion Pekka Päivärinta, but fewer races were held and the FIM World Sidecar Championship was cancelled. In the IDM they finished in fifth place and in the International Sidecar SuperPrix 2020, a competition organized by the German and British federations when the FIM World Sidecar Championship 2020 was canceled due to the restrictions during the COVID-19 pandemic, they finished ninth.

Clément started the 2021 season as passenger of Bennie Streuer, riding a Adolf RS-Yamaha for the German Bonovo Action team. With Steuer she took part in the first round of the French FSBK-F1 sidecar races on March 27 and 28, 2021 at the Circuit Bugatti in Le Mans, France, winning the first race, and finished second in the second race. On April 9, 2021, Streuer and Clément crashed during a test drive in |Motorsport Arena Oschersleben in Germany. Streuer was injured and would have to rehabilitation for 6 to 12 months. Clément, who was unhurt, became the passenger of Todd Ellis, the 2019 British Champion. and in June, 2021 they started in the first race of the 2021 Sidecar World Championship on the Circuit Bugatti in Le Mans, France. Ellis and Clément finished the 2021 Sidecar World Championship second on their LCR-Yamaha machine behind Swiss duo Marcus Schlosser and Marcel Fries.

In 2022 and 2023 Ellis and Clément won the Superside World Championship.

=== Sidecar World Championship results ===
Year	Driver	Motorbike	1	2	3	4	5	6	7	8	9	10	11	12	13	14	15	16	Place	Points
2021	Todd Ellis	LCR-Yamaha	FRA1; 3	FRA2; 2	HUN1; 3	HUN2; 2	GBR1; 1	GBR2; 3	NED1; DNF	NED2; 2	CRO1; 2	CRO2; 3	OSC1; 2	OSC2; 3	POR1; 3	POR2; 5	POR3; 4		2nd	269
2022	Todd Ellis	LCR-Yamaha	FRA1; 1	FRA2; 2	NED1; 2	NED2; 1	BEL1; 1	BEL2; 1	HUN1; 1	HUN2; 2	CRO1; 1	CRO2; DNF	GBR1; 1	GBR2; 2	GER1; 1	GER2; 1	POR1; 2	POR2; 3	1st	377
2023	Todd Ellis	LCR-Yamaha	GER1; 3	GER2; 4	BEL1; 1	BEL2; 2	CZE1; 4	CZE2; 1	AUT1; 5	AUT2; 1	NED1; 1	NED2; 1	OSC1; 2	OSC2; 2	POR1; 3	POR2; 3			1st	270

== British F1 Sidecar Championship ==
In 2021, Ellis and Clément finished fourth in the British Sidecar Championship.

They won the British F1-Sidecar Championship in 2022 and 2023.

== Isle of Man TT ==
In November 2023, it was announced that Clément and Todd Ellis would make their Isle of Man TT debut in 2024.

== Footnotes ==
Sporting positions
Preceded by Marcus Schlosser; With: Marcel Fries	World Sidecar Champion; 2022–2023; With: Todd Ellis	Succeeded by
