= 3 Wheeling =

- Theatrical release poster
- Directed by: Nathan Russell-Raby
- Written by: Nathan Russell-Raby
- Produced by: Chris Beauman
- Starring: Dave Molyneux; Tim Reeves; Klaus Klaffenböck
- Production company: Beaumanx Productions
- Distributed by: Beaumanx Productions
- Release date: 8 May 2017
- Running time: 101 minutes
- Country: Isle of Man
- Language: English

3 Wheeling is a Manx observational documentary film charting the sidecar class at the 2016 Isle of Man TT. The film used hidden cameras and lavalier microphones to capture an insight into the sport's highest-profile competitors, Dave Molyneux and Tim Reeves.

The film was financed and distributed by Beaumanx Productions and was shot in association with North One Television, Blue Olive Productions and the Isle of Man Government. It received a limited theatrical release in Northern Ireland, Germany and the Isle of Man, and was released on home media in May 2018.

== Development ==
Manx sidecar enthusiast and sponsor Christopher Beauman first devised the idea of a reality show in the Isle of Man TT paddocks hoping to promote sidecar racing to a wider audience, in order to increase sponsorship potential for the competitors. Development began in early 2015 with Greenlight International handling sales and distribution.

== Production ==
The Department of Economic Development (Isle of Man) provided support in allowing the production company access to restricted zones at the TT Grandstand, and principal photography took place during racing period of 2016 with Dave Molyneux, Tim Reeves and Klaus Klaffenböck attached to star.

Manx-Based company Blue Olive Productions captured original footage with racing footage filmed and licensed by North One Television. The camera-crew described the filming technique as "invisibly intrusive" and admitted that it took several days to develop a suitable method of capturing the action close-up, without affecting the race-team's concentration.

Beaumanx Productions sponsored Dave Molyneux Racing in order to secure the publicity-shy racer. The film's director stated that Molyneux's dislike for the limelight made 3 Wheeling difficult to film, but acknowledged that it allowed them to portray Molyneux as a "...brilliant character..." with "...a tremendous screen-presence...".

Second Unit was filmed during the Southern 100 and Manx Grand Prix 2016, and the movie took ten months to complete.

== Release ==
The official trailer was previewed at the TT Press Launch in March 2017 and the film was premiered at the Villa Marina on 7 May. Most of the film's stars were in attendance; Reeves and Klaffenböck were unable to attend due to racing seasons commitments. The film was then released in theatres in Northern Ireland, Germany, and the Isle of Man.
