= Pannónia-Ring =

Racing circuit in Ostffyasszonyfa, Hungary

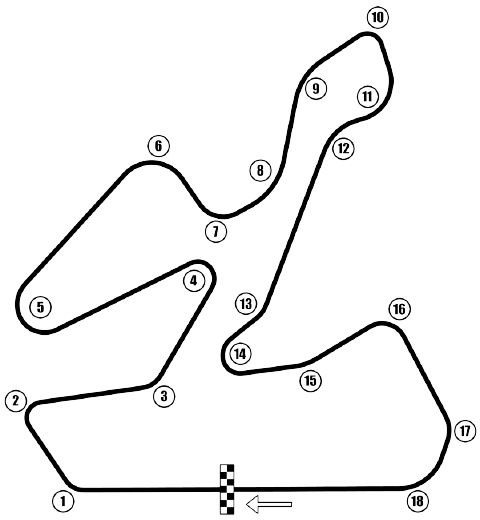
- Full Circuit (1996–present)
- Location: Ostffyasszonyfa, Hungary
- Coordinates: 47°18′15″N 17°02′47″E
- Broke ground: 22 February 1996; 30 years ago
- Opened: 1 August 1996; 29 years ago
- Major events: Current: Alpe Adria International Motorcycle Championship (2011–2020, 2023–present); Former: Sidecar World Championship (2015–2019, 2021–2022, 2025); Austria Formula 3 Cup (2009); IDM Superbike Championship (1997–1999, 2005)

Full Circuit (1996–present)
- Length: 4.740 km (2.945 mi)
- Turns: 18
- Race lap record: 1:46.707 ( (Germany) Arnold Wagner, Dallara SN01, 2009, Formula Nissan)

The Pannónia-Ring is a motor and racing circuit in Ostffyasszonyfa, Hungary. It is located south of the town centre, accessible by road on the 8451.

== Data about the track ==
- Track length: 4.740 km (2.945 mi)
- Number of right turns: 11
- Number of left turns: 7
- Track width: 11–13 m (12–14 yd)
- Length of start-finish straight: 700 m (770 yd)
- Max speed Pro-Superbike: approx. 260 km/h (160 mph)
- High-line tumbling zones (gravel)

One of the world's safest motorcycle and car speedway circuits. Dive zones up to 50–150 m (55–164 yd), with even longer slip-outs due to the environmental conditions. The track also has a special feature: it is homologated in the opposite direction (left-hand side).

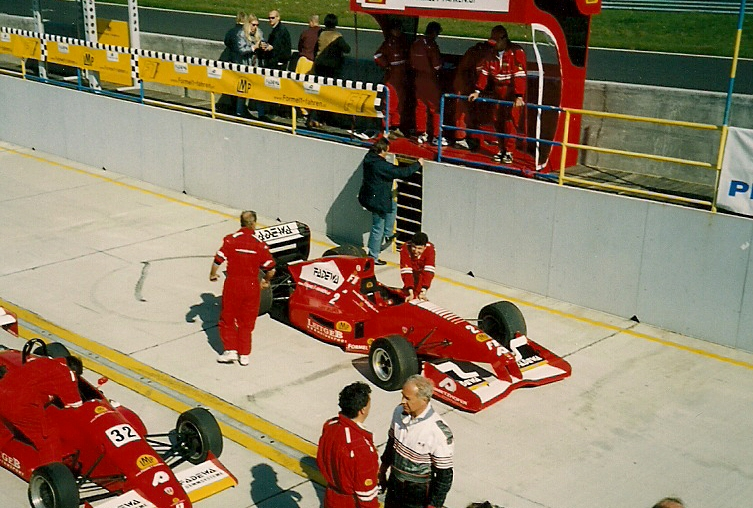
Formula 3000 test on the Pannónia-Ring in 2000

Homologation to international standards, state-of-the-art infrastructure: health station, electronic timing, petrol station, express service, tyre service, motorbike showroom, restaurant, 300 sqm main building, go-kart and supermoto track, helipad, motel, sanitary, restaurant. The pit lane has 20 boxes and the depot has 15 more.

== Lap records ==
As of June 2026, the fastest official race lap records at the Pannónia-Ring are listed as:

Category	Time	Driver	Vehicle	Event
Full Circuit (1996–present): 4.740 km (2.945 mi)
Formula Nissan	1:46.707	Arnold Wagner	Dallara SN01	2009 Pannónia-Ring Austria F3 Cup round
Formula Renault 2.0	1:47.118	Chanoch Nissany	Tatuus FR2000	2009 Pannónia-Ring Austria F3 Cup round
Formula Three	1:47.154	Nikolas Kvasai	Dallara F304	2009 Pannónia-Ring Austria F3 Cup round
Superbike	1:49.685	Nicholas Spinelli	Ducati Panigale V4 R	2026 Pannónia-Ring Alpe Adria Superbike round
Supersport	1:54.013	Görbe Soma	Yamaha YZF-R6	2023 Pannónia-Ring Alpe Adria Supersport round
Porsche Carrera Cup	1:55.367	Patrick Eisemann	Porsche 911 (991 I) GT3 Cup	2015 Pannónia-Ring Porsche GT3 Challenge Cup Central Europe round
Sportbike	1:57.841	Daniel Tureček	Aprilia RS660 Factory	2026 Pannónia-Ring Alpe Adria Sportbike round
Supersport 300	2:04.137	Máté Számadó	Kawasaki Ninja 400	2023 Pannónia-Ring Alpe Adria Supersport 300 round
