= Ben and Tom Birchall =

Motorcycle racing duo

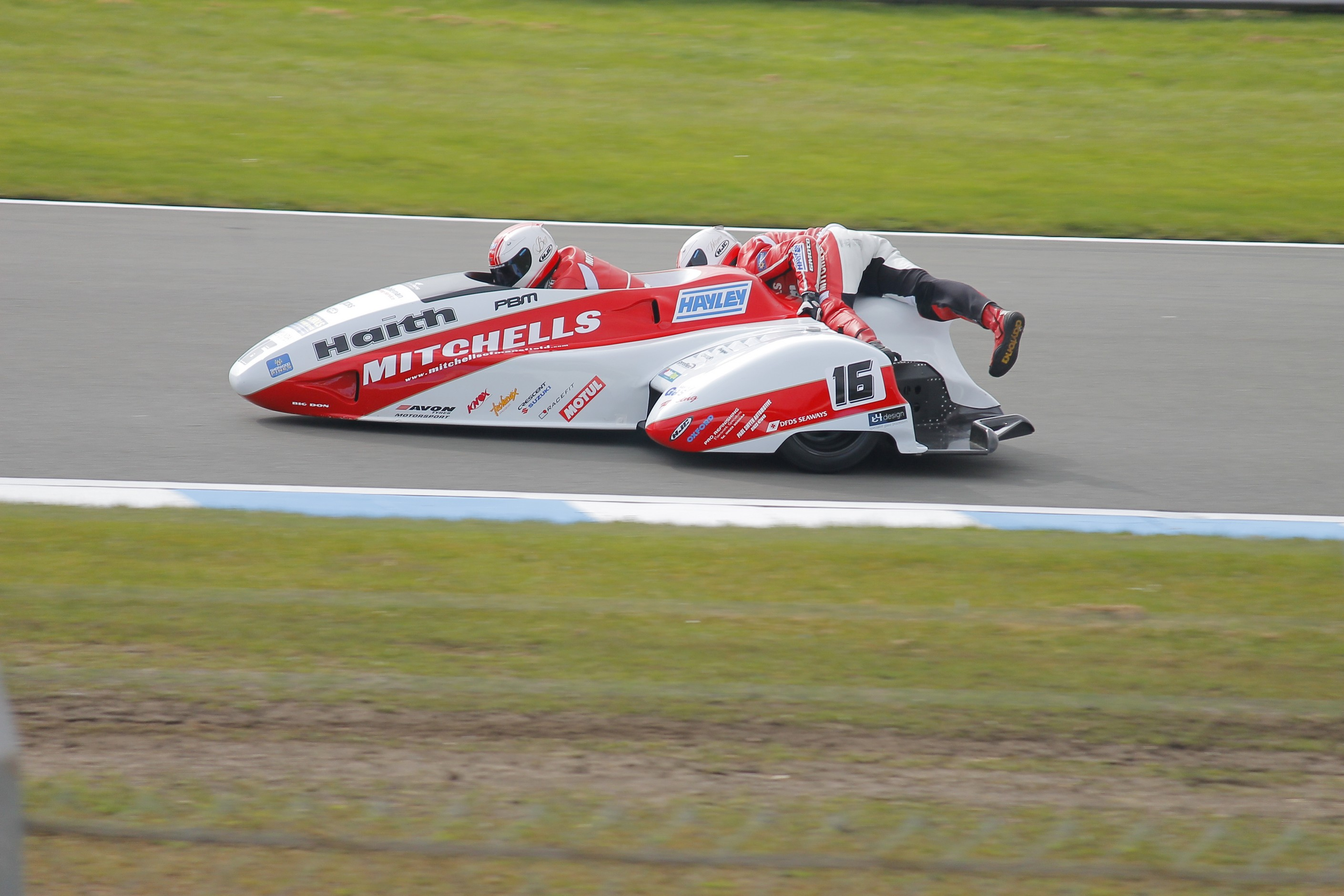
- Ben Birchall (driver) with Tom (passenger) racing at Donington Park in 2015 in a F1 sidecar
- Nationality: English
Motorcycle racing career statistics
Isle of Man TT career
TTs contested	22 (2009-2023)
TT wins	14
First TT win	2013 Sidecar TT Race B
Last TT win	2023 Sidecar TT Race B
TT podiums	16
- TT Sidecar lap record holders (120.645 mph, 2023)

Ben Birchall (born 21 January 1977) and Tom Birchall, (born 23 December 1986), from Mansfield, Nottinghamshire, are English motorcycle-with-sidecar road race World Championship-winning competitors in both the F1 (2009 and 2018 seasons) and F2 categories (2016, officially known as F2 Sidecar World Trophy, using 600 cc engines running on TT short outfits usually made with tubular frames) and again in the 2017 season – when all competitors used 600 engines.

The brothers are 14-time TT winners, having won in 2013, 2015 (twice), 2016, 2017 (twice), 2018 (twice), 2019 (twice), 2022 (twice) and 2023 (twice) . They set absolute lap and race records in 2015, 2017, 2018, and 2023 with an average speed of 120.645mph.

During the 2017 season the reigning F2 sidecar champions campaigned in the World championship and British Championship (600 Cup) as Team Mansfield with IEG Racing, using an LCR F1 outfit powered by a Yamaha R6 600 cc engine. For the 2017 Isle of Man TT races in June and the island's Southern 100 races in July they used a smaller (F2) LCR short chassis, as required by the regulations, powered by a Honda 600 cc engine.

In May 2019, Ben was elected to Mansfield District Council in the Kings Walk ward, representing the Mansfield Independent Forum.

On 19 December 2023, Tom Birchall announced his immediate retirement from racing, although Ben still planned to compete in 2024 with another passenger. Experienced French racer Kevin Rousseau was confirmed in early 2024 to be his teammate during their upcoming TT races campaign. In September 2024, the Birchall brothers were awarded the 2023 Segrave Trophy for 'outstanding skill, courage and initiative'.

== Racing history ==
Ben Birchall started racing as a sidecar passenger in 1999, and became a driver in 2003. Tom Birchall started racing as a passenger in 2003.

=== 2009 ===
In 2009, they were F1 Sidecar World Champions.

=== 2010 ===
In 2010, a new LCR long (F2) Louis Christen chassis with Yamaha R1 engine was tested in France, before debuting in April at Pembrey for the first round of the British Championship, followed by the first round of the World Championship at Le Mans, France, held as a support race to the FIM Endurance World Championship.

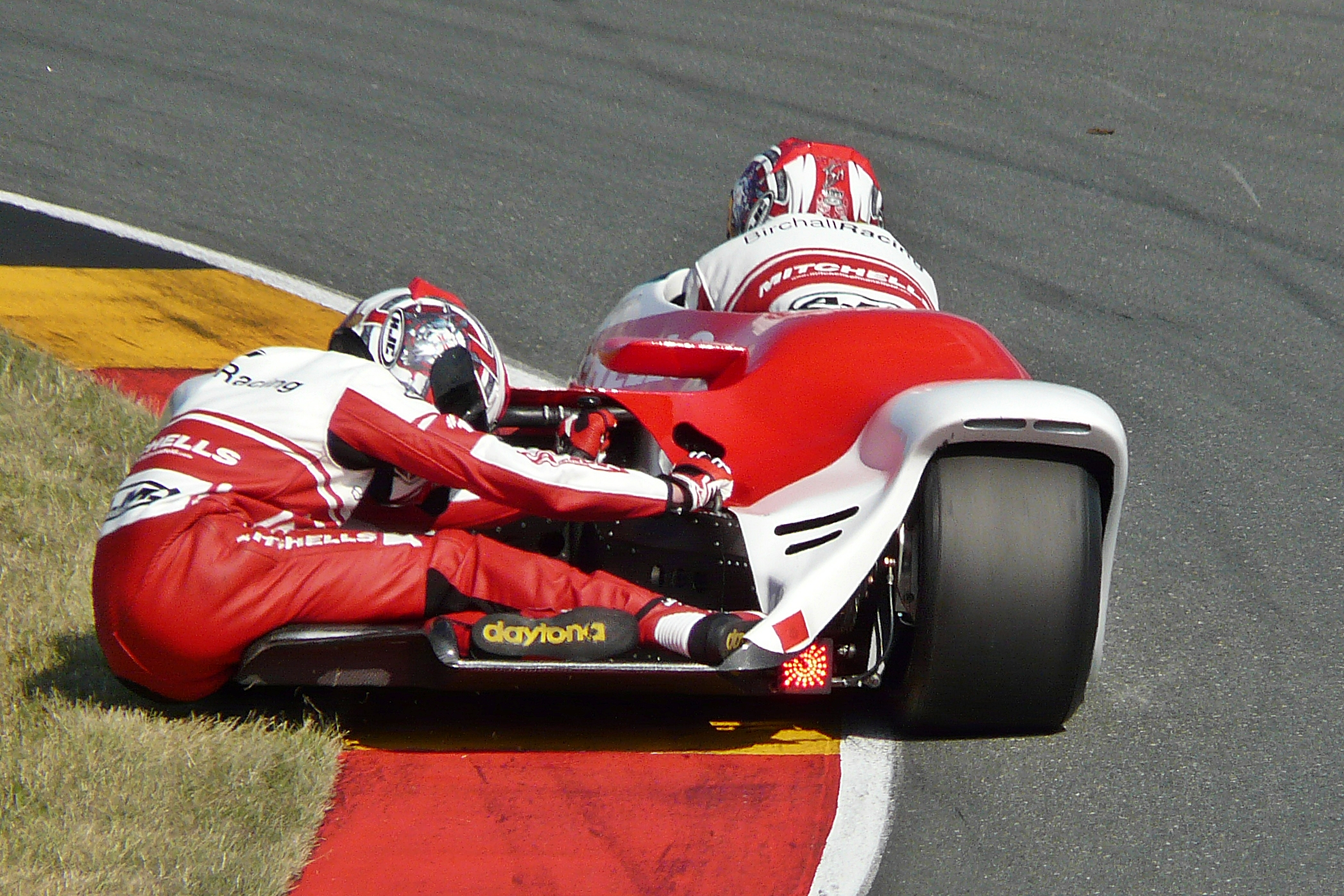
The Birchall brothers at Sachsenring in 2010

The short (F2) chassis needed to comply with Isle of Man TT regulations was not ready in time to test thoroughly before the May/June event, meaning the brothers cancelled their race plans due to unproven safety and performance reasons.

Ben Birchall suffered back injuries in a practice crash at the Croatia world championship round, needing skin grafts.

=== 2011 ===
In February 2011, the Birchalls were chosen as Nottinghamshire County Council's Sports Team of the Year after an online public vote. The brothers were awarded the freedom of their hometown of Mansfield by then-Mayor Tony Egginton in 2011, who also awarded the accolade to Olympic multiple gold medal swimmer Rebecca Adlington in 2008.

=== 2012 ===
In 2012, the Birchalls joined with former World Champion sidecar racer and TT winner Klaus Klaffenböck and former passenger Adolf Hanni in a new team called Cofain Racing by Klaffi, using long (F1) and short (F2) LCR chassis with Honda engines prepared by Chris Mehew. The team was presented to the press with a photo-call at Creg-ny-Baa, a famous corner on the Isle of Man TT course.

During practice for the 2012 TT in June, they ran off the course at high speed close to Brandywell:

"It is a 120mph corner and I knew we were going to leave the road. It is straight down and I had a split second to make a decision. I decided to go off head first rather than risk rolling all the way down. I turned round and saw Tom stuck in a sheep fence." – Ben Birchall, Sidecar driver

Both brothers were airlifted to hospital suffering from severe bruising and discharged after observation. The machine was extensively damaged needing a new chassis and bodywork, but after the team's rebuild they resumed practising and in the actual races gained second and third places in the two-leg event.

After the two TT race legs, they immediately left for their debut at Hungaroring race track in Hungary, the second round of the FIM World Championship where they finished in fourth place after a two-part race interrupted by rain. Back on the Isle of Man, in their absence, their Spirit of TT Award was received on their behalf by father John Birchall and Klaus Klaffenbock.

They entered their first Southern 100 short-length road races in July 2012 and were the first newcomers to debut as winners of the sidecar championship, also receiving their Spirit of TT award on their return to the island.

=== 2013 ===
In 2013, they won their first TT race.

=== 2014 ===
In 2014, they experienced a TT crash near Black Dub. Both were initially treated at Noble's hospital in Douglas. Tom suffered a bruised lung, cuts and severe bruising, whilst Ben had a seriously damaged right hand. He was transferred to Wigan where an orthopaedic surgeon, helped by a plastic surgeon, rebuilt his hand with metal plates and wires, successfully saving his injured little finger.

=== 2015 ===
In 2015, the Birchalls withdrew from the F1 World Championship after the opening round at Donington Park, citing a host of reasons but mainly the dangerous driving of Tim Reeves in causing a collision that disabled the Birchalls' outfit, for which he was disqualified from the race. A lengthy public statement was issued.

=== 2016 ===
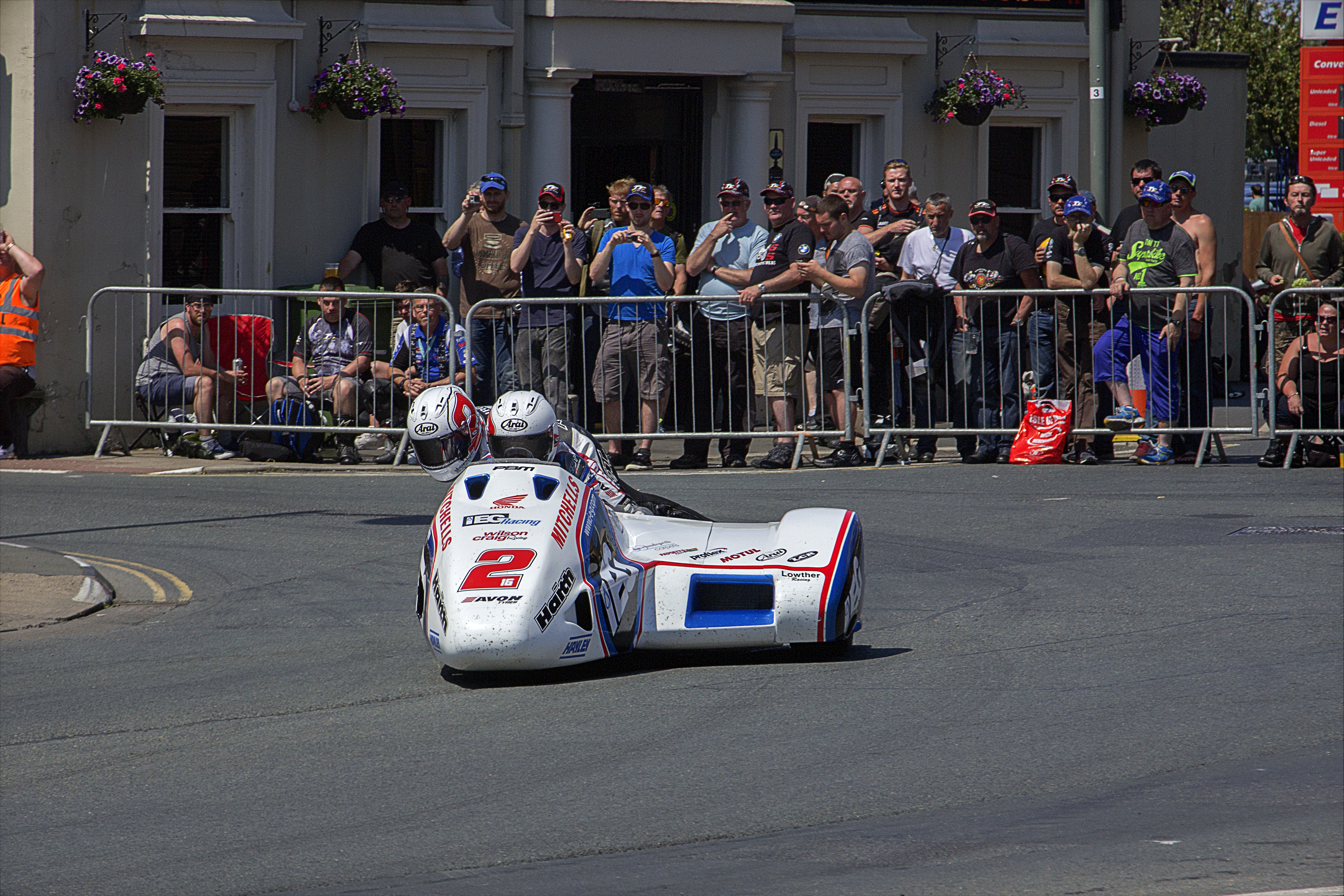
Ben and Tom Birchall took their fourth TT win in 2016

In August 2016, before the season's end, the brothers had already amassed a points tally to become F1 (600) champions in August running along with the F1 1000 cc competitors.

=== 2017 ===
In 2017, the brothers again won the World Championship, this time after the September round in Croatia, using the same 600 cc engine as all other competitors. With their two 2017 Isle of Man TT race wins, this was the first time in history of the sport that both prestigious titles were won by the same team in a single year.

=== 2018 ===
The brothers were once again crowned world champions as the championship battle went to the final round at the German circuit of Oschersleben. The Birchalls took the championship win with a convincing victory. In the same year, they won both Isle of Man Sidecar TT Races to become eight-time TT winners - also taking the outright race and lap records; they were the first ever sidecar team to lap the TT circuit in under 19 minutes. (https://www.iomtt.com/news/2018/06/08/birchalls-smash-own-record-in-first-sub-nineteen-minute-lap)

=== 2019 ===
The brothers once again contested both the World Championship and Isle of Man TT Races - two further TT wins took their tally to ten wins with Tom Birchall becoming the most successful sidecar passenger of all time and the duo becoming level in wins on the all time TT wins leader board with Giacamo Agostini. His tenth TT win also escalated Ben to become the second most successful TT Sidecar Driver of all time behind Dave Molyneux.

They took third place in the World Championship having taken won three races during a season which was blighted by technical issues.

== Full TT results ==
2023	Sidecar Race 1; 1	Sidecar Race 2; 1
2022	Sidecar Race 1; 1	Sidecar Race 2; 1
2019	Sidecar Race 1; 1	Sidecar Race 2; 1
2018	Sidecar Race 1; 1	Sidecar Race 2; 1
2017	Sidecar Race 1; 1	Sidecar Race 2; 1
2016	Sidecar Race 1 DNF	Sidecar Race 2; 1
2015	Sidecar Race 2; 1	Sidecar Race 2; 1
2014	Sidecar Race 1 DNF	
2013	Sidecar Race 1 DNF	Sidecar Race 2; 1
2012	Sidecar Race 1; 2	Sidecar Race 2; 3
2011	Sidecar Race 1; 7	Sidecar Race 2; 5
2009	Sidecar Race 1 DNF	
