= Darren Dixon (motorcyclist) =

British motorcycle racer

Darren Dixon is an English former professional motorcycle racer.

Originally a sidecar racer, Dixon scored his first win at Lydden Circuit in 1981 in the 'B' final with a new passenger, Terry McGahan. They stayed together through 1982 and scored 38 wins together including a lap record at Brands Hatch which stood until 1991. After an astounding rise through club racing finances meant his sidecar promise would be put on hold and he took to solo racing and quickly climbed the ranks to become a top national level solo racer. He won the British Superbike Championship in 1988 on a Suzuki RG500 and made two 500cc Grand Prix appearances. His greatest achievement was winning the Sidecar World Championship in 1995 and 1996. Dixon later went on to manage a Superbike team. Darren is the father of 2018 second placed British Superbike rider, and current Moto2 rider Jake Dixon.

Sporting positions
Preceded by Rolf Biland; With: Kurt Waltisperg	World Sidecar Champion; 1995-1996; With: Andy Hetherington	Succeeded by Steve Webster; With: David James
