= Tim Reeves =

British motorcycle racer

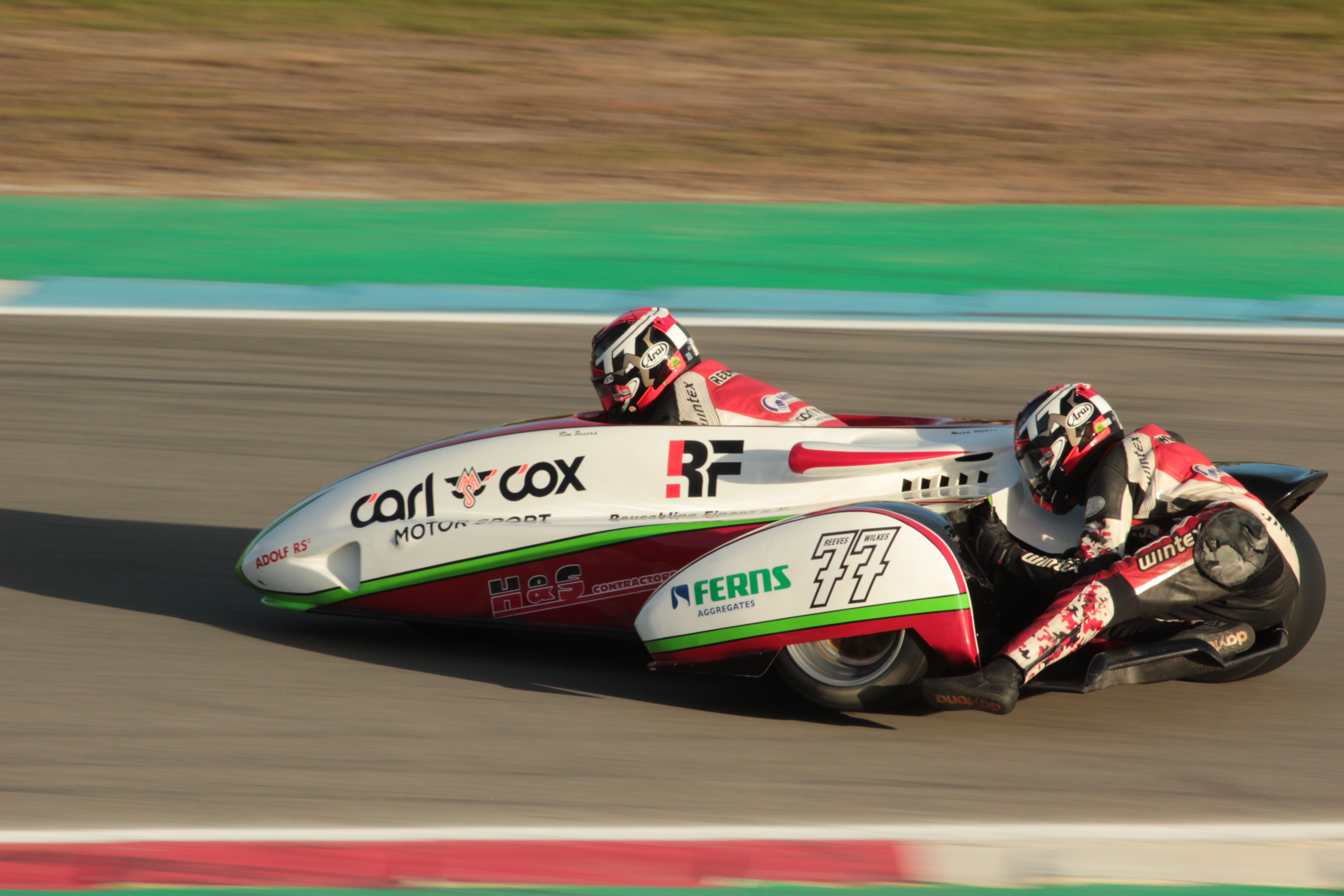
- Reeves and passenger Mark Wilkes at Assen during a Guest Start in British Sidecar Championship, 2018
- Nationality: British
- Born: 28 August 1972 (age 54)
Motorcycle racing career statistics
Isle of Man TT career
TTs contested	6 (2008 – present)
First TT win	2013 Sidecar TT Race 1
Last TT win	2013 Sidecar TT Race 1
TT podiums	9

Tim Reeves (born 28 August 1972) is an English sidecar racer from Tenterden, Kent. He is an eight-time Superside FIM World Sidecar Champion, twice with his younger brother Tristan (2005, 2006), once with Patrick Farrance (2007) and once with Ashley Hawes (2012) as passenger.

In 2014, Reeves won the Superside World Championship and the World F2 Sidecar Trophy in the Motorsport Arena Oschersleben with French passenger Gregory Cluze.

In 2008, Reeves and Farrance entered in their first Isle of Man Sidecar TT finishing an outstanding third place in race one and sixth in race two. In 2013, Reeves, with passenger Dan Sayle finally got to the top step of the TT podium in Sidecar TT Race 1.

In the 2008 Sidecar World Championship, Reeves and Farrance placed second behind Pekka Päivärinta and Timo Karttiala (LCR-Suzuki GSX-R 1000). .

In 2017, Reeves featured heavily in the film 3 Wheeling, an observational documentary filmed during TT period of 2016. The film premiered on 7 May 2017, followed by a limited theatrical release of 61 screenings in cinema's in Northern Ireland and the Isle of Man.

Sporting positions
Preceded by Steve Webster; With: Paul Woodhead	World Sidecar Champion; 2005–2007; With: Tristan Reeves (2005–2006); Patrick Farrance (2007)	Succeeded by Pekka Päivärinta; With: Timo Karttiala
Preceded by Pekka Päivärinta; With: Adolf Hänni	World Sidecar Champion; 2012; With: Ashley Hawes	Succeeded by Pekka Päivärinta; With: Adolf Hänni
Preceded by Pekka Päivärinta; With: Adolf Hänni	World Sidecar Champion; 2014; With: Gregory Cluze	Succeeded by Bennie Streuer; With: Geert Koerts
Preceded by Ben Birchall; With: Tom Birchall	World Sidecar Champion; 2019; With: Mark Wilkes	Succeeded by
Preceded by none	World F2 Sidecar Champion; 2014-2015; With: Gregory Cluze; Patrick Farrance (2015)	Succeeded by Ben Birchall; With: Tom Birchall
