= Egbert Streuer =

Dutch motorcycle racer

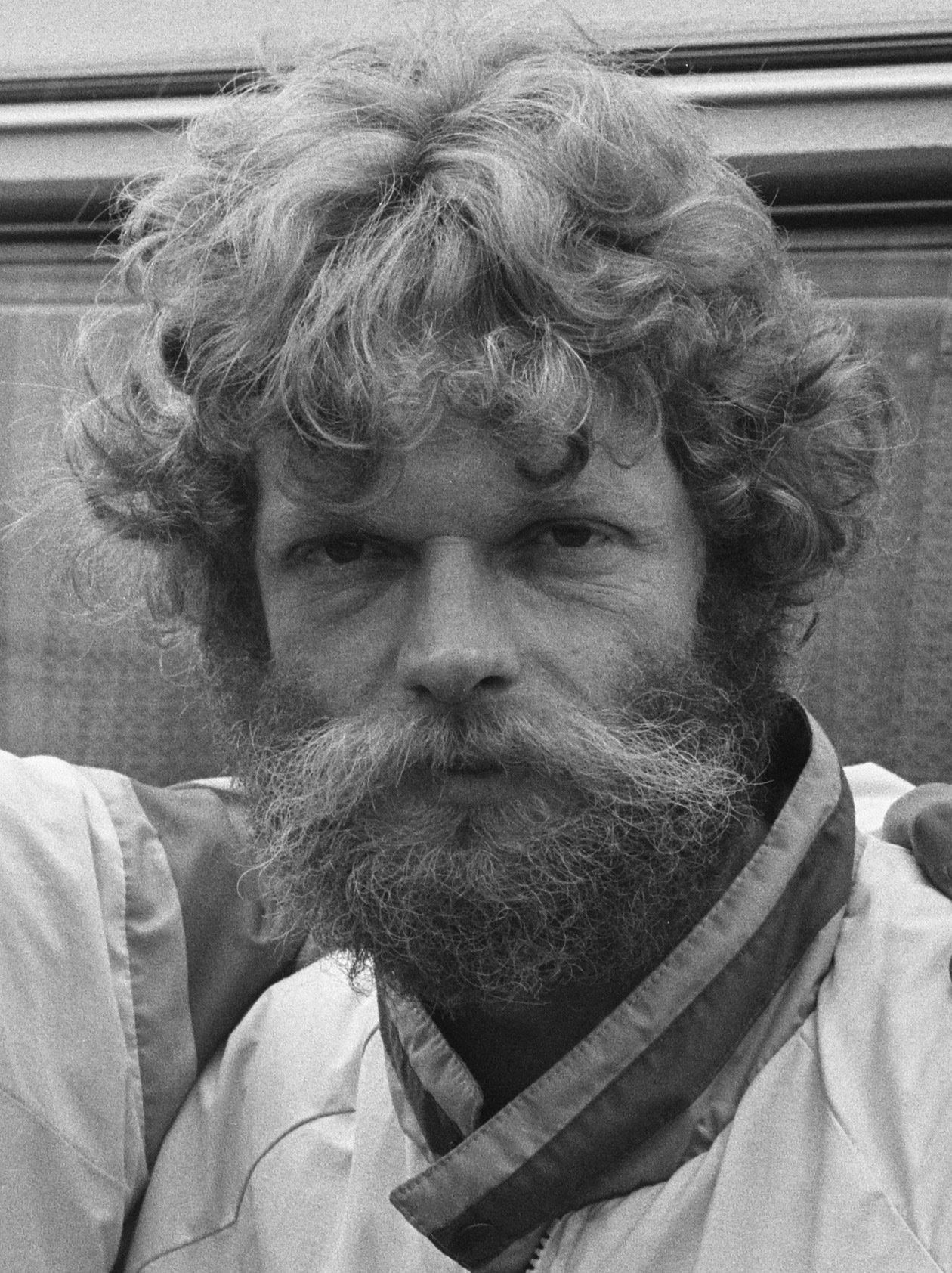
- Nationality: Dutch
- Born: 1 February 1954 (age 72); Assen
Motorcycle racing career statistics
Grand Prix motorcycle racing
| Active years | 1978 - 1992 |
| First race | 1978 French Grand Prix |
| Last race | 1992 Dutch TT |
| First win | 1982 British Grand Prix |
| Last win | 1992 Dutch TT |
| Championships | Sidecars - 1984, 1985, 1986 |
Starts / Wins / Podiums / Poles / F. laps / Points; / 22 / 56 / / / 1102.5

Egbert Streuer (born 1 February 1954) is a Dutch former professional sidecar driver and arguably the most successful Dutch motorcycle racer of all time.

Assisted by passenger Bernard Schnieders, Streuer became world champion in 1984, 1985 and 1986. In the next five years, he was still in the final ranking in the top three. The sidecar class was at that time still a part of the world championship grand prix and there was a lot of competition. Streuers' main rivals were Rolf Biland, Steve Webster and Alain Michel. A total of 22 Grand Prix victories were achieved by Streuer, 15 with Bernard Schnieders.

Although Streuer and Schnieders had already celebrated triumphs in almost all circuits, they would initially fail in their own hometown, to win. A victory at the Dutch TT was at one time more important than anywhere else in the world. In 1987, they finally went first across the finish line in their home GP. Streuer repeated this feat in 1991.

The first sidecar passenger of Streuer was Johan van der Kaap who participated between 1978 and 1980 in the Grands Prix. After van der Kaap quit for personal reasons in 1981, Bernard Schnieders took his place.

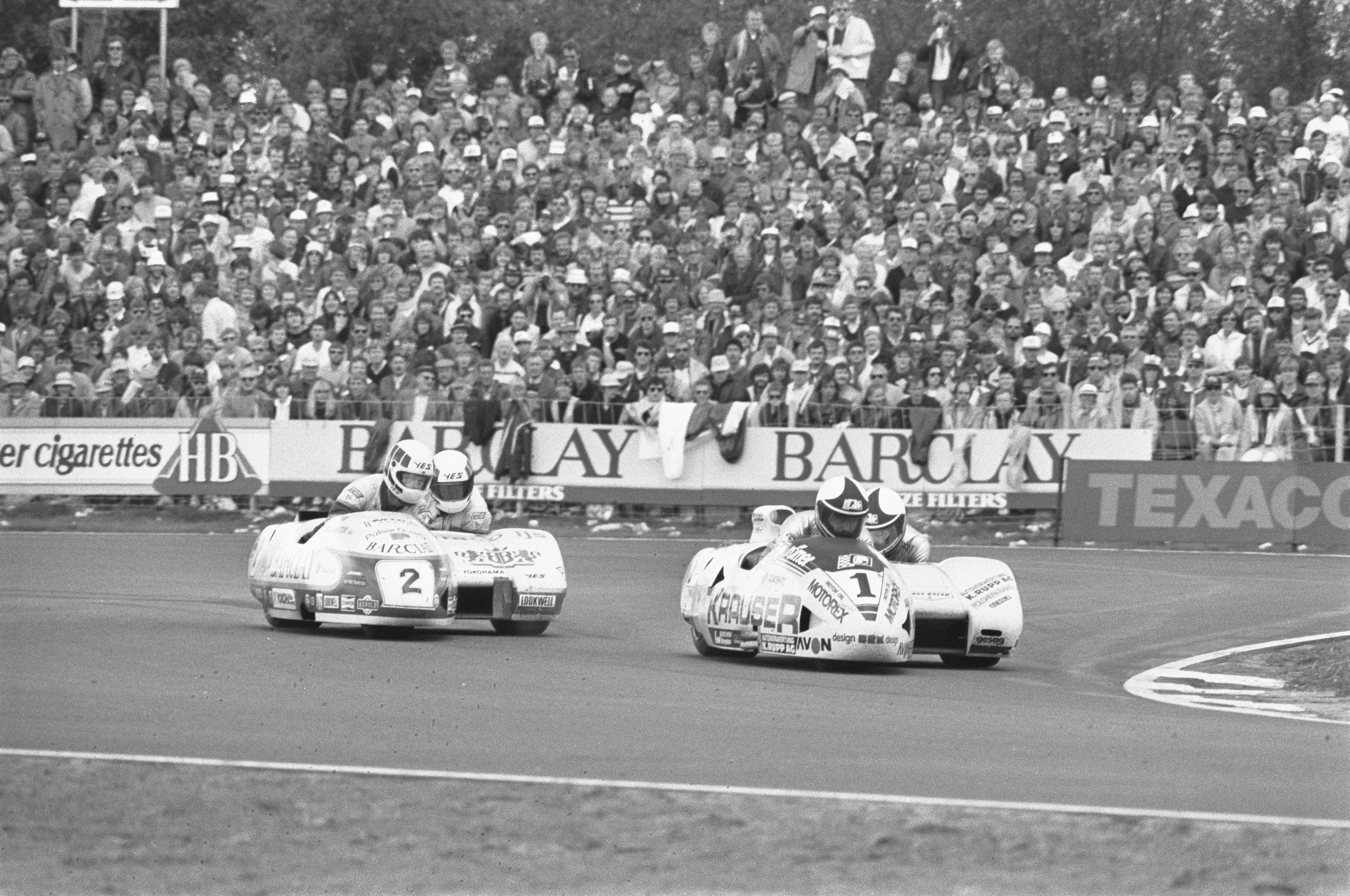
Streuer and Bernard Schnieders (2) pursue Rolf Biland and Kurt Waltisperg (1) during the 1984 Sidecar Dutch TT.

Schnieders stopped after the end of 1988 his place was taken by Geral de Haas which yielded two World Championship runner up places in 1989 and 1990. During the 1990 Sidecar World Championship, Egbert Streuer was primarily partnered with Geral de Haas. However, at the Hungarian Grand Prix, de Haas was unable to compete due to health reasons. Streuer was joined by Scott Whiteside, who usually raced alongside Michael Burcombe. Together, Streuer and Whiteside secured third place at the Hungarian round—a key result that helped Streuer clinch second overall in the championship standings, overtaking Steve Webster.

In 1991 and 1992, the Englishman Peter Brown took place in the chair but further successes were not to be.

Streuer not only known as a fast and safe driver, but also as a gifted technician. With his rugged beard and imposing moustache, he was a striking figure in the paddock, although he remained rather modest in the background. Streuer is father of 2015 Sidecar World Champion Bennie Streuer.

Sporting positions
| Preceded by Rolf Biland; With: Kurt Waltisperg | World Sidecar Champion; 1984–1986; With: Bernard Schnieders | Succeeded by Steve Webster; With: Tony Hewitt |
