= Alain Michel (motorcyclist) =

French motorcycle racer

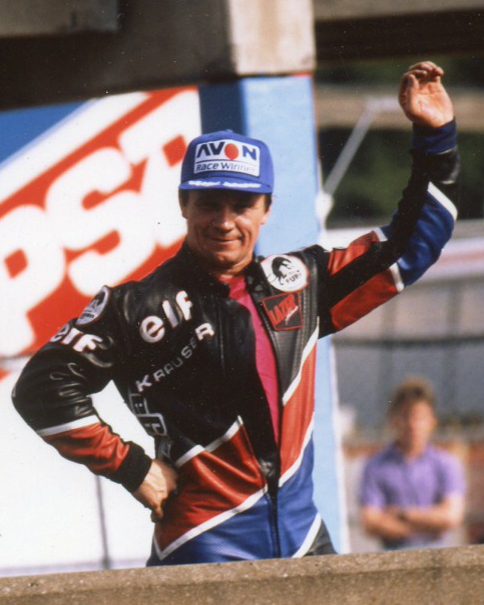
Alain Michel enjoy his title.

Alain Michel (born 23 February 1953) in Montelimar is a French sidecar racer and motorcycle preparer. He is the only French World Sidecar Champion.

Michel's career began on two wheels 1972. He also won this year's Cup Four Seasons category on a Honda 450 and finished in second place in the championship of France 500 national.

Considering this experience as inconclusive, Michel embarked on three wheels 1975 and in 1976 began to a career Grand Prix category sidecar in which he obtained some good results.

Michel's first Grand Prix victory, he won in France at Paul Ricard in 1977, with Gérard Lecorre as a passenger. That year would be marked by a classic race in the rain at Silverstone (England) but would result in abandonment. They finished fifth in the World Championship.

In 1978, the team ended runner-up in the world with its new passenger Stuart Collins earned after two victories.

In 1979, a new "monkey" took place in the basket; Michael Burkhard. The crew had two victories at Mans and Assen and a fourth-place finish in the World Championship.

In 1980, 1981 and 1982, the crew won four victories, many podiums and finished respectively 2, 3 and 4 in the championships those years.

1984 with Jean-Marc Fresc in the "basket" and still the third position in the world at the end of the season before having a "catastrophic" season 1985.

In 1986, Michel and Fresc struggled all season against the crew of Streuer and Schnieders. A fifth place at Hockenheim (Germany) because of a loose headphone lost the crew valuable points for the championship final, they would be perfectly equal on the number of points. But due to five wins against two to the French crew, it is the Dutch team that are world champions.

Undeterred, Michel and Jean-Marc Fresc went on to fight in 1987 with five podiums in 1988 still fourth with two podiums, then in 1989, he finished third in the championship with three podiums.

In 1990, it is the dedication with his passenger Simon Birchall and the title of world champion sidecar, won on a LCR-Krauser.

Another season in 1991, the 16th at the highest level and Alain Michel finally hangs up the leathers and helmet. Meanwhile, during this period, he has won nine titles of Champion of France in the category.

Among other activities, Michel continued for some time to be with the world of motorcycle racing, taking care to develop machines enduro, or designing with his friend Claude Fior, motorcycle Grand Prix suspension.

== Honours ==
- World Champion 1990.
- Vice-world champion in 1978, 1981 and 1986.
- Champion of France (9 titles)
- 16 seasons at the highest level.
- 138 Grands Prix contested.
- 77 Podiums.
- 18 Wins.
- 43 Pole positions and lap records.

Sporting positions
Preceded by Steve Webster; With: Tony Hewitt	World Sidecar Champion; 1990; With: Simon Birchall	Succeeded by Steve Webster; With: David James
