= Steve Webster (sidecar racer) =

English sidecar racer

Steve Webster MBE
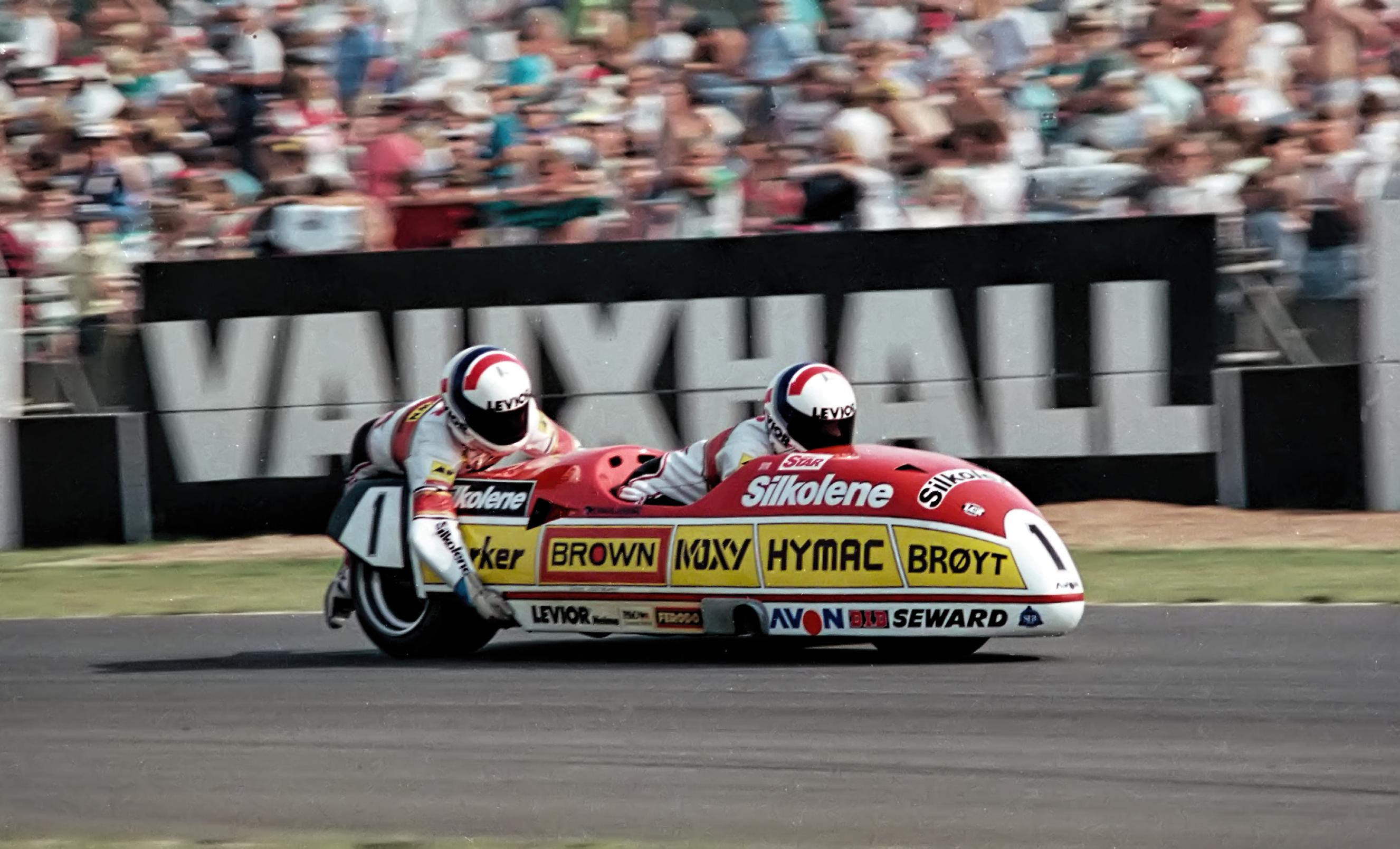
- Nationality: (United Kingdom) British
Motorcycle racing career statistics
Isle of Man TT career
TTs contested	1 (1983)
TT wins	0
TT podiums	0

Stephen Webster MBE (born 7 January 1960), is an English sidecar racer who has won six FIM Sidecar World Championships and four world cup, making him the most successful sidecar racer ever.

== Career ==
Born in Easingwold, North Yorkshire, Webster began as a 19-year-old racing at club level, first racing at the Elvington Airfield circuit near York, and quickly moved up to national and then world championship in 1983, winning his first world championship in 1987 while partnered with Tony Hewitt, riding an LCR-Yamaha machine. From 181 Grand Prix and World Cup races entered, he has had 62 wins, 37 second places and 27 third places as well as 82 pole positions. He has won the FIM Sidecar World Championship on 10 occasions (1987, 1988, 1989, 1991, 1997, 1998, 1999, 2000, 2003, and 2004), with Tony Hewitt, Gavin Simmons, David James and Paul Woodhead.

In 1985 Webster and Hewitt had a massive crash at the Dutch TT at Assen, shown many times on television where the sidecar left the track at high speed, slid along the grass before hitting a drainage ditch. The accident caused the pair to miss most of the season.

Webster was appointed Member of the Order of the British Empire (MBE) in the 1990 Birthday Honours for services to sidecar racing. He was the recipient of the Segrave Trophy in 1991.

In 2004 Webster won British, European, and World titles, but in 2005 Webster announced his retirement after health problems prevented him finishing the season.

In 2006, Webster received a Lifetime Achievement Award from the Auto Cycle Union.

In 2015, Webster was reunited with Hewitt on track, the pair taking part in a test event at Mallory Park.

Sporting positions
Preceded by Egbert Streuer; With: Bernard Schnieders	World Sidecar Champion; 1987-1989; With: Tony Hewitt (1987-1989); Gavin Simmons (1988)	Succeeded by Alain Michel; With: Simon Birchall
Preceded by Alain Michel; With: Simon Birchall	World Sidecar Champion; 1991; With: Gavin Simmons	Succeeded by Rolf Biland; With: Kurt Waltisperg
Preceded by Darren Dixon; With: Andy Hetherington	World Sidecar Champion; 1997-2000; With: David James (1997-1999); Paul Woodhead (2000)	Succeeded by Klaus Klaffenböck; With: Christian Parzer
Preceded by Steve Abbott; With: Jamie Biggs	World Sidecar Champion; 2003-2004; With: Paul Woodhead	Succeeded by Tim Reeves; With: Tristan Reeves
