= Louis Christen Racing =

Motorcycle manufacturer

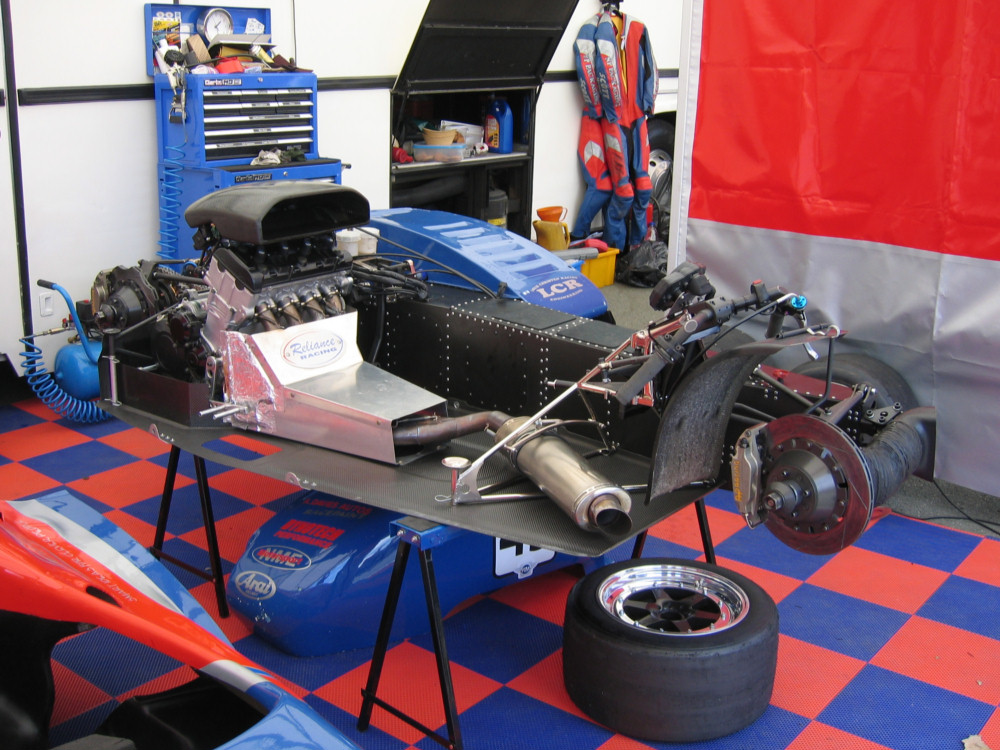
LCR Sidecar in race paddock.

Louis Christen Racing (LCR) is a Swiss sidecar manufacturer named after founder Louis Christen. LCR sidecars have dominated sidecar road racing winning 30 World Sidecar Championships including every one of Steve Webster's 10 world championships.

LCR started in 1971 building open wheel racing cars, Formula Vee, Formula Ford and Formula 3.

In 1976 the first LCR sidecar was designed. From 1983 to 1989 they produced a series of successful monocoque frames for the 80 cc and 125 cc Grand Prix solo classes. The Zündapp works team and later Krauser were using 80 cc frames and rider Stefan Dörflinger twice won the World Championship. There were several Grand Prix wins in the 125 class with MBA engines.

In 2007 LCR expanded into the Formula 2 sidecar class, supplying two sidecars for the Isle of Man TT, including the one campaigned by Manxmen Nick Crowe and Daniel Sayle that set a new lap record.
