= 1978 British motorcycle Grand Prix =

(United Kingdom) 1978 British Grand Prix
Race details
- Race 10 of 13 races in the 1978 Grand Prix motorcycle racing season
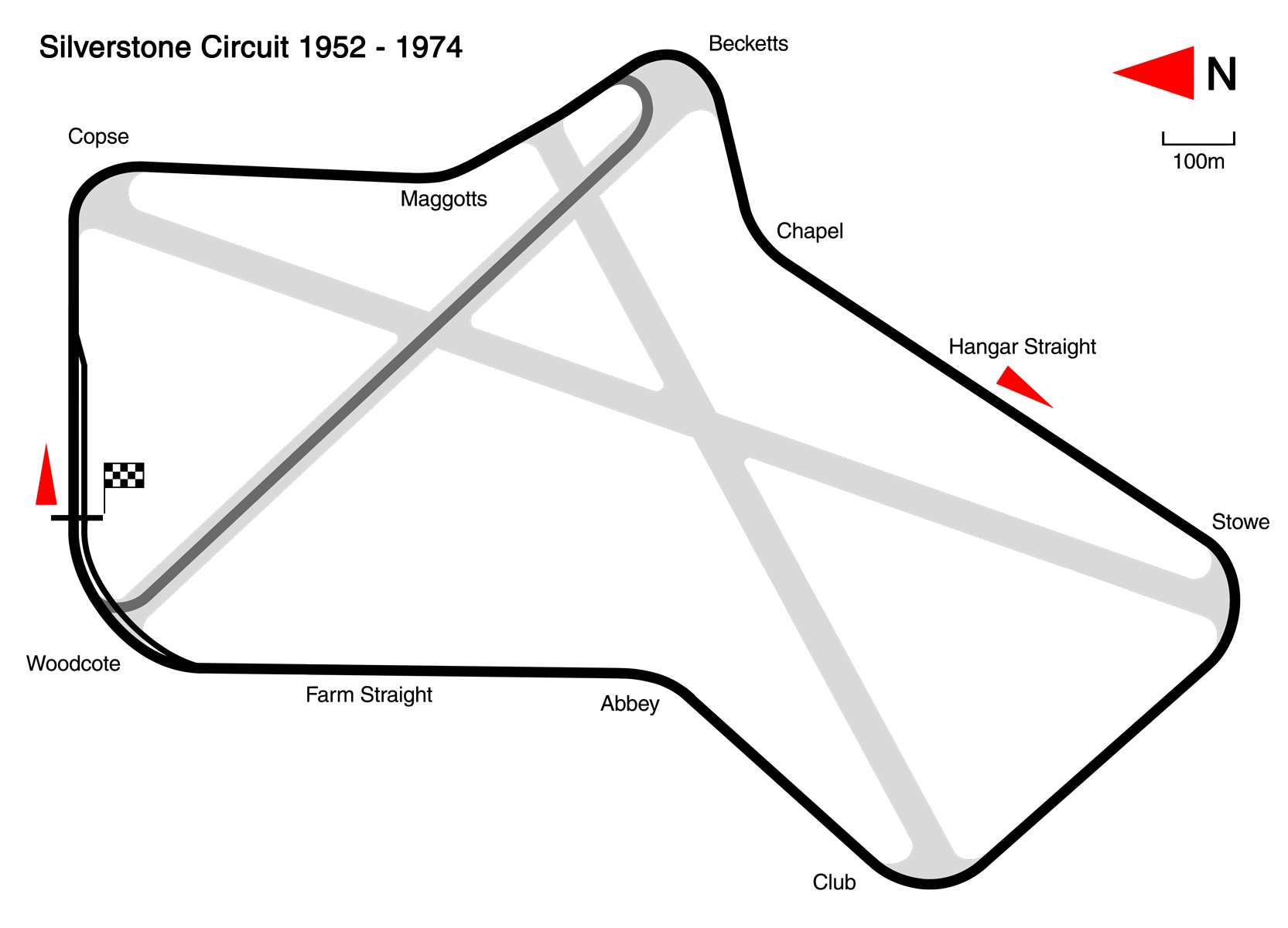
- Date: 6 August 1978
- Official name: John Player British Grand Prix
- Location: Silverstone Circuit
- Course: Permanent racing facility; 4.711 km (2.927 mi)

500cc
Pole position
- Rider: (France) Michel Rougerie
- Time: 1:30.980
Fastest lap
- Rider: (United States) Kenny Roberts
- Time: 1:31.38
Podium
- First: (United States) Kenny Roberts
- Second: (United Kingdom) Steve Manship
- Third: (United Kingdom) Barry Sheene

350cc
Pole position
- Rider: (South Africa) Kork Ballington
- Time: 1:34.600
Fastest lap
- Rider: (United Kingdom) Tom Herron
- Time: 1:33.830
Podium
- First: (South Africa) Kork Ballington
- Second: (United Kingdom) Tom Herron
- Third: (United Kingdom) Mick Grant

250cc
Pole position
- Rider: (South Africa) Kork Ballington
- Time: 1:37.140
Fastest lap
- Rider: (West Germany) Anton Mang
- Time: 1:37.400
Podium
- First: (West Germany) Anton Mang
- Second: (United Kingdom) Tom Herron
- Third: (France) Raymond Roche

125cc
Pole position
- Rider: (Italy) Eugenio Lazzarini
- Time: 1:42.690
Fastest lap
- Rider: (Italy) Eugenio Lazzarini
- Time: 1:42.220
Podium
- First: (Spain) Ángel Nieto
- Second: (United Kingdom) Clive Horton
- Third: (Italy) Eugenio Lazzarini

Sidecar (B2A)
Pole position
- Rider: (Switzerland) Rolf Biland
- Passenger: (United Kingdom) Kenny Williams
- Time: 1:38.190
Fastest lap
- Rider: (Switzerland) Rolf Biland
- Passenger: (United Kingdom) Kenny Williams
- Time: 1:46.920
Podium
- First rider: (France) Alain Michel
- First passenger: (United Kingdom) Stu Collins
- Second rider: (Switzerland) Rolf Biland
- Second passenger: (United Kingdom) Kenny Williams
- Third rider: (United Kingdom) Jock Taylor
- Third passenger: (United Kingdom) James Neil

The 1978 British motorcycle Grand Prix was the tenth round of the 1978 Grand Prix motorcycle racing season. It took place on 5–6 August 1978 at Silverstone Circuit.

== 500cc race report ==
Kenny Roberts and Barry Sheene, the two championship contenders arrived in England for the British Grand Prix with only three points separating them. The race ended in controversy when torrential rains during the race, along with pit stops for tire changes by both Roberts and Sheene, created confusion among official scorers. Eventually, Roberts was declared the winner with Sheene being awarded third place behind privateer Steve Manship, who did not stop for a tire change.

== 500cc classification ==
Pos.	No.	Rider	Team	Manufacturer	Time/Retired	Points
1	1	(United States) Kenny Roberts	Yamaha Motor Company	Yamaha	55'56.930	15
2	43	(United Kingdom) Steve Manship		Suzuki	+8.050	12
3	7	(United Kingdom) Barry Sheene	Texaco Heron Team Suzuki	Suzuki	+1'06.760	10
4	11	(Italy) Marco Lucchinelli	Cagiva Corse	Suzuki	+1'29.350	8
5	2	(Finland) Tepi Länsivuori		Suzuki	+1'56.980	6
6	22	(Italy) Gianni Rolando	Team Librenti	Suzuki	+1 lap	5
7	4	(Venezuela) Johnny Cecotto	Yamaha Motor Company	Yamaha	+1 lap	4
8	5	(United Kingdom) John Newbold	Ray Hamblin Motorcycles	Suzuki	+1 lap	3
9	8	(Japan) Takazumi Katayama	Sarome & Motul Team	Yamaha	+1 lap	2
10	12	(Italy) Virginio Ferrari	Team Gallina Nava Olio Fiat	Suzuki	+1 lap	1
11	13	(France) Michel Rougerie		Suzuki	+1 lap	
12	16	(United Kingdom) John Williams	Team Appleby Glade	Suzuki	+1 lap	
13	9	(United Kingdom) Alex George		Suzuki	+1 lap	
14	42	(Netherlands) Jack Middelburg		Suzuki	+1 lap	
15	6	(United Kingdom) Steve Parrish		Suzuki	+2 laps	
16	3	(Switzerland) Philippe Coulon	Marlboro Nava Total	Suzuki	+2 laps	
17	28	(West Germany) Gerhard Vogt	Bill Smith Racing	Suzuki	+2 laps	
18	38	(Sweden) Peter Sjoström		Suzuki	+3 laps	
19	17	(New Zealand) John Woodley	Sid Griffiths Racing	Suzuki	+3 laps	
20	37	(Netherlands) Dick Alblas		Suzuki	+3 laps	
Ret	??	(Netherlands) Wil Hartog	Riemersma Racing	Suzuki	Retired	
Ret	??	(Italy) Graziano Rossi	Team Gallina Nava Olio Fiat	Suzuki	Accident	
Ret	??	(Italy) Franco Bonera	Team Kiwi Yamoto	Cagiva	Accident	
Ret	??	(Switzerland) Bruno Kneubühler	RSS Racing Team	Suzuki	Tyre problems	
Ret	??	(New Zealand) Dennis Ireland		Suzuki	Tyre problems	
Ret	??	(New Zealand) Roger Marshall	George Beale	Yamaha	Tyre problems	
Ret	??	(Australia) Jack Findlay		Suzuki	Tyre problems	
Ret	??	(South Africa) Leslie van Breda		Suzuki	Retired	
Ret	??	(Austria) Max Wiener		Suzuki	Retired	
Ret	??	(Netherlands) Boet van Dulmen		Suzuki	Retired	
Ret	??	(United Kingdom) Kevin Stowe	Harold Coppock	Suzuki	Retired	
Ret	??	(Austria) Werner Nenning	Mobel Nenning Racing Team	Suzuki	Retired	
Ret	??	(United States) Steve Baker	Team Gallina Nava Olio Fiat	Suzuki	Retired	
Ret	??	(West Germany) Franz Rau	Kazenmaier Autovermietung	Suzuki	Retired	
Ret	??	(United Kingdom) Graham Wood	Barton Spondon	Suzuki	Retired	
Ret	??	(United Kingdom) Dave Potter	Ted Broad	Suzuki	Retired	
Ret	??	(United Kingdom) Ron Haslam	Mal Carter	Yamaha	Retired	
Ret	??	(United Kingdom) Marc Fontan		Suzuki	Retired	

== 350 cc classification ==
Pos	No.	Rider	Manufacturer	Laps	Time	Grid	Points
1	5	(South Africa) Kork Ballington	Kawasaki	28	44:43.57	1	15
2	2	(United Kingdom) Tom Herron	Yamaha	28	+10.23	6	12
3	10	(United Kingdom) Mick Grant	Kawasaki	28	+23.01	10	10
4	4	(France) Michel Rougerie	Yamaha	28	+52.43	5	8
5	23	(Italy) Franco Bonera	Yamaha	28	+59.09		6
6	25	(Australia) Vic Soussan	Yamaha	28	+59.76		5
7	7	(France) Christian Sarron	Yamaha	28	+59.85	8	4
8	6	(France) Olivier Chevallier	Yamaha	28	+1:00.24	3	3
9	28	(Sweden) Leif Gustafsson	Yamaha	28	+1:00.74		2
10	19	(France) Patrick Pons	Yamaha	28	+1:30.23		1
11	51	(Switzerland) Roland Freymond	Yamaha	28	+1:31.27		
12	29	(Italy) Paolo Pileri	Morbidelli	28	+1:31.48		
13	50	(United Kingdom) Clive Padgett	Yamaha	27	+1 lap		
14	44	(United Kingdom) Ian Richards	Yamaha	27	+1 lap		
15	31	(Japan) Sadao Asami	Yamaha	27	+1 lap		
16	47	(Netherlands) Jack Middelburg	Yamaha	27	+1 lap		
17	40	(Finland) Reino Eskelinen	Yamaha	27	+1 lap		
18	41	(Italy) Walter Villa	Harley-Davidson	27	+1 lap		
		(Japan) Takazumi Katayama	Yamaha			2	
		(Australia) Gregg Hansford	Kawasaki			4	
		(Australia) Ray Quincey	Yamaha			7	
		(France) Raymond Roche	Yamaha			9	
41 starters in total

== 250 cc classification ==
Pos	No.	Rider	Manufacturer	Laps	Time	Grid	Points
1	15	(West Germany) Anton Mang	Kawasaki	26	43:03.32		15
2	5	(United Kingdom) Tom Herron	Yamaha	26	+0.19	4	12
3	29	(France) Raymond Roche	Yamaha	26	+23.45	9	10
4	10	(United Kingdom) Mick Grant	Kawasaki	26	+30.82	8	8
5	13	(France) Olivier Chevallier	Yamaha	26	+30.97	7	6
6	26	(Switzerland) Hans Müller	Yamaha	26	+31.48	5	5
7	18	(France) Jean-François Baldé	Kawasaki	26	+31.64	10	4
8	9	(France) Patrick Fernandez	Yamaha	26	+31.78		3
9	51	(Switzerland) Roland Freymond	Yamaha	26	+59.31		2
10	43	(France) Marc Fontan	Yamaha	26	+59.63		1
11	22	(United Kingdom) Clive Padgett	Yamaha	26	+1:10.30		
12	21	(Australia) Vic Soussan	Yamaha	26	+1:11.84		
13	53	(France) Hervé Moineau	Yamaha	26	+1:13.67		
14	54	(Australia) Greg Johnson	Yamaha	26	+1:21.87		
15	33	(South Africa) Dudley Cramond	Yamaha	26	+1:31.36		
16	32	(Finland) Reino Eskelinen	Yamaha	26	+1:34.76		
17	28	(Japan) Sadao Asami	Yamaha	26	+1:35.41		
18	30	(Japan) Ken Nemoto	Yamaha	25	+1 lap		
19	25	(Austria) Harald Bartol	HBI	25	+1 lap		
20	17	(United Kingdom) Bernard Murray	Yamaha	25	+1 lap		
		(South Africa) Kork Ballington	Kawasaki			1	
		(United States) Kenny Roberts	Yamaha			2	
		(Australia) Gregg Hansford	Kawasaki			3	
		(Australia) John Dodds	Yamaha			6	
38 starters in total, 21 finishers

== 125 cc classification ==
Pos	No.	Rider	Manufacturer	Laps	Time	Grid	Points
1	3	(Spain) Ángel Nieto	Minarelli	24	44:51.08	4	15
2	10	(United Kingdom) Clive Horton	Morbidelli	24	+17.02	8	12
3	2	(Italy) Eugenio Lazzarini	MBA	24	+21.20	1	10
4	38	(France) Thierry Espié	Motobécane	24	+29.90	2	8
5	8	(Switzerland) Hans Müller	Morbidelli	24	+40.67	5	6
6	7	(Switzerland) Stefan Dörflinger	Morbidelli	24	+40.94	7	5
7	17	(Sweden) Per-Edward Carlson	Morbidelli	24	+45.37		4
8	39	(France) Yves Dupont	Morbidelli	24	+1:01.91		3
9	4	(France) Jean-Louis Guignabodet	Morbidelli	24	+1:10.39		2
10	20	(Italy) Felice Agostini	Morbidelli	24	+1:10.65		1
11	43	(Switzerland) Karl Fuchs	Morbidelli	24	+1:44.40		
12	30	(Netherlands) Cees van Dongen	Morbidelli	23	+1 lap		
13	34	(France) Daniel Meyer	Morbidelli	23	+1 lap		
14	47	(Austria) Ernst Fagerer	Morbidelli	23	+1 lap		
15	24	(Monaco) Patrick Herouard	Morbidelli	23	+1 lap		
16	29	(Netherlands) Jan Ubels	Buton	22	+2 laps		
17	36	(Switzerland) Alain Pellet	Morbidelli	22	+2 laps		
		(Italy) Pierluigi Conforti	Morbidelli			3	
		(Austria) Harald Bartol	Morbidelli			6	
		(Sweden) Bengt Johansson	Morbidelli			9	
		(France) Thierry Noblesse	Morbidelli			10	
34 starters in total

== Sidecar classification ==
Pos	No.	Rider	Passenger	Manufacturer	Laps	Time	Grid	Points
1	5	(France) Alain Michel	(United Kingdom) Stu Collins	Seymaz-Yamaha	25	45:27.56	2	15
2	2	(Switzerland) Rolf Biland	(United Kingdom) Kenny Williams	Beo-Yamaha	25	+11.36	1	12
3	17	(United Kingdom) Jock Taylor	(United Kingdom) James Neil	Windle-Yamaha	25	+1:02.13	5	10
4	14	(United Kingdom) Bill Hodgkins	(United Kingdom) John Parkins	Windle-Yamaha	25	+1:10.44		8
5	1	(United Kingdom) George O'Dell	(United Kingdom) Cliff Holland	Seymaz-Yamaha	25	+1:23.39	4	6
6	22	(United Kingdom) Mick Boddice	(United Kingdom) Chas Burns	Woodhouse-Yamaha	25	+1:27.92		5
7	18	(Switzerland) Jean-François Monnin	(Switzerland) Paul Gerard	Seymaz-Yamaha	25	+1:41.19		4
8	7	(United Kingdom) Dick Greasley	(United Kingdom) Gordon Russell	Busch-Yamaha	24	+1 lap	6	3
9	11	(West Germany) Siegfried Schauzu	(West Germany) Lorenzo Puzo	Busch-Yamaha	24	+1 lap		2
10	6	(Sweden) Göte Brodin	(Sweden) Per-Erik Wickström	Yamaha	24	+1 lap	8	1
11	23	(Netherlands) Cees Smit	(Netherlands) Jan Smit	Seymaz-Yamaha	24	+1 lap		
12	15	(West Germany) Hermann Huber	(West Germany) Bernd Schappacher	König	24	+1 lap		
13	32	(Switzerland) Gérard Corbaz	(Switzerland) Roland Gabriel	Schmid-Yamaha	24	+1 lap		
14	27	(United Kingdom) Derek Jones	(United Kingdom) Brian Ayres	Daytona-Yamaha	24	+1 lap		
15	29	(United Kingdom) John Barker	(United Kingdom) Nick Cutmore	Yamaha	24	+1 lap		
		(West Germany) Rolf Steinhausen	(West Germany) Wolfgang Kalauch	Seymaz-Yamaha			3	
		(Austria) Wolfgang Stropek	(Austria) Karl Altrichter	Schmid-Yamaha			7	
		(Switzerland) Bruno Holzer	(Switzerland) Karl Meierhans	LCR-Yamaha			9	
		(Switzerland) Hermann Schmid	(United Kingdom) Kenny Arthur	Schmid-Yamaha			10	
31 starters in total, 21 finishers

Previous race: 1978 Finnish Grand Prix	FIM Grand Prix World Championship; 1978 season	Next race: 1978 German Grand Prix
Previous race: 1977 British Grand Prix	British Grand Prix	Next race: 1979 British Grand Prix
