= 1978 German motorcycle Grand Prix =

(West Germany) 1978 German Grand Prix
Race details
- Race 11 of 13 races in the 1978 Grand Prix motorcycle racing season
- Date: 20 August 1978
- Official name: Grosser Preis von Deutschland
- Location: Nürburgring
- Course: Permanent racing facility; 22.835 km (14.189 mi)

500cc
Pole position
- Rider: (Venezuela) Johnny Cecotto
- Time: 8:31.700
Fastest lap
- Rider: (Italy) Virginio Ferrari
- Time: 8:29.500
Podium
- First: (Italy) Virginio Ferrari
- Second: (Venezuela) Johnny Cecotto
- Third: (United States) Kenny Roberts

350cc
Pole position
- Rider: (Australia) Gregg Hansford
- Time: 8:44.700
Fastest lap
- Rider: (Japan) Takazumi Katayama
- Time: 8:39.700
Podium
- First: (Japan) Takazumi Katayama
- Second: (South Africa) Kork Ballington
- Third: (France) Michel Rougerie

250cc
Pole position
- Rider: (Australia) Gregg Hansford
- Time: 8:53.300
Fastest lap
- Rider: (South Africa) Kork Ballington
- Time: 8:49.500
Podium
- First: (South Africa) Kork Ballington
- Second: (Australia) Gregg Hansford
- Third: (United Kingdom) Tom Herron

125cc
Pole position
- Rider: (France) Thierry Espié
- Time: 9:23.800
Fastest lap
- Rider: (Spain) Ángel Nieto
- Time: 9:17.000
Podium
- First: (Spain) Ángel Nieto
- Second: (France) Thierry Espié
- Third: (Switzerland) Hans Müller

50cc
Pole position
- Rider: (Spain) Ricardo Tormo
- Time: 10:24.000
Fastest lap
- Rider: (Spain) Ricardo Tormo
- Time: 10:15.800
Podium
- First: (Spain) Ricardo Tormo
- Second: (Spain) Ángel Nieto
- Third: (Italy) Eugenio Lazzarini

Sidecar (B2A)
Pole position
- Rider: (Switzerland) Rolf Biland
- Passenger: (United Kingdom) Kenny Williams
- Time: 9:15.800
Fastest lap
- Rider: (France) Alain Michel
- Passenger: (United Kingdom) Stu Collins
- Time: 9:06.800
Podium
- First rider: (West Germany) Werner Schwärzel
- First passenger: (West Germany) Andreas Huber
- Second rider: (France) Alain Michel
- Second passenger: (United Kingdom) Stu Collins
- Third rider: (United Kingdom) Dick Greasley
- Third passenger: (United Kingdom) Gordon Russell

The 1978 German motorcycle Grand Prix was the eleventh round of the 1978 Grand Prix motorcycle racing season. It took place on 20 August 1978 at the Nürburgring circuit.

== 500cc classification ==
Pos.	No.	Rider	Team	Manufacturer	Time/Retired	Points
1	12	(Italy) Virginio Ferrari	Team Gallina Nava Olio Fiat	Suzuki	51'21.700	15
2	4	(Venezuela) Johnny Cecotto	Yamaha Motor Company	Yamaha	+0.700	12
3	3	(United States) Kenny Roberts	Yamaha Motor Company	Yamaha	+33.900	10
4	7	(United Kingdom) Barry Sheene	Texaco Heron Team Suzuki	Suzuki	+36.000	8
5	17	(Japan) Takazumi Katayama	Sarome & Motul Team	Yamaha	+36.300	6
6	13	(France) Michel Rougerie		Suzuki	+56.000	5
7	2	(United States) Steve Baker	Team Gallina Nava Olio Fiat	Suzuki	+57.500	4
8	29	(Netherlands) Boet van Dulmen		Suzuki	+1'08.100	3
9	9	(Finland) Tepi Länsivuori		Suzuki	+1'10.000	2
10	59	(West Germany) Jürgen Steiner	Caramba Racing Team Bohme	Suzuki	+2'10.400	1
11	26	(Netherlands) Jack Middelburg		Suzuki	+2'11.200	
12	1	(Italy) Franco Bonera		Suzuki	+2'15.800	
13	5	(United Kingdom) Steve Parrish		Suzuki	+2'16.100	
14	15	(Austria) Max Wiener		Suzuki	+2'25.700	
15	63	(United Kingdom) Alex George		Suzuki	+3'40.700	
16	28	(West Germany) Gerhard Vogt	Bill Smith Racing	Suzuki	+3'44.100	
17	??	(West Germany) Hans-Otto Butenuth		Yamaha	+5'04.900	
18	??	(Australia) Jack Findlay		Suzuki	+5'18.400	
19	37	(Netherlands) Dick Alblas		Suzuki	+5'19.700	
20	??	(Japan) Tako Hase		Yamaha	+5'42.900	
21	??	(West Germany) Franz Shermer		Suzuki	+5'58.500	
22	??	(Spain) Carlos Delgado de San Antonio		Suzuki	+6'00.100	
23	??	(Switzerland) René Gutknecht		Suzuki	+6'00.300	
24	??	(Austria) Michael Schmid		Suzuki	+6'28.700	
25	??	(Switzerland) Philippe Coulon	Marlboro Nava Total	Suzuki	+6'56.400	
26	??	(West Germany) Hans-Günter Schöne		Yamaha	+8'58.600	
27	??	(Sweden) Lars Johansson		Yamaha	+8'59.800	
28	??	(West Germany) Walter Kaletsch		Yamaha	+9'50.900	
29	??	(West Germany) Gustav Canehl		Yamaha	+1 lap	
Ret	??	(Italy) Marco Lucchinelli	Cagiva Corse	Suzuki	Retired	
Ret	??	(Switzerland) Bruno Kneubühler	RSS Racing Team	Suzuki	Retired	
Ret	??	(West Germany) Franz Rau	Kazenmaier Autovermietung	Suzuki	Retired	
Ret	??	(Austria) Herbert Schieferecke		Yamaha	Retired	
Ret	??	(West Germany) Iingo Riemer		Yamaha	Retired	
Ret	??	(Netherlands) Wil Hartog	Riemersma Racing	Suzuki	Retired	
Ret	??	(West Germany) Jan Verwey		Suzuki	Retired	
Ret	??	(France) Jean-Claude Hogrel	Buton	Buton	Retired	
Ret	??	(Italy) Graziano Rossi	Team Gallina Nava Olio Fiat	Suzuki	Retired	
Ret	??	(Austria) Hans Braumandl		Suzuki	Retired	
Ret	38	(Sweden) Peter Sjoström		Suzuki	Retired	
Ret	??	(Switzerland) Michel Frutschi		Yamaha	Retired	
Ret	??	(Denmark) Børge Nielsen		Suzuki	Retired	
Ret	??	(South Africa) Leslie van Breda		Suzuki	Retired	
Ret	22	(Italy) Gianni Rolando	Team Librenti	Suzuki	Retired	
Ret	??	(West Germany) Gustav Reiner		Yamaha	Retired	
Ret	??	(West Germany) Horst Scherer		Yamaha	Retired	
Ret	??	(West Germany) Horst Scherer		Yamaha	Retired	
Ret	??	(West Germany) Horst Lahfeld		König	Retired	
DNS	??	(West Germany) Bernd Dawicki		König	Did not start	

== 350 cc classification ==
Pos	No.	Rider	Manufacturer	Laps	Time	Grid	Points
1	1	(Japan) Takazumi Katayama	Yamaha	6	52:27.4	6	15
2	5	(South Africa) Kork Ballington	Kawasaki	6	+0.2	2	12
3	4	(France) Michel Rougerie	Yamaha	6	+40.8	7	10
4	3	(South Africa) Jon Ekerold	Yamaha	6	+42.1	8	8
5	2	(United Kingdom) Tom Herron	Yamaha	6	+43.4	4	6
6	63	(West Germany) Anton Mang	Kawasaki	6	+1:09.9	5	5
7	6	(France) Olivier Chevallier	Yamaha	6	+1:37.0		4
8	23	(Italy) Franco Bonera	Yamaha	6	+1:38.1		3
9	10	(France) Patrick Pons	Yamaha	6	+2:04.3		2
10	53	(France) Hervé Moineau	Yamaha	6	+2:10.2		1
11	82	(West Germany) Gustav Rainer	Yamaha	6	+2:29.7		
12	18	(Finland) Reino Eskelinen	Yamaha	6	+2:41.6		
13	66	(West Germany) Josef Hage	Yamaha	6	+3:07.8		
14	22	(Italy) Maurizio Massimiani	Yamaha	6	+3:38.8		
15	24	(Italy) Vanes Francini	Yamaha	6	+3:56.1		
		(Australia) Gregg Hansford	Kawasaki			1	
		(France) Christian Sarron	Yamaha			3	
		(Finland) Pentti Korhonen	Yamaha			9	
		(Sweden) Leif Gustafsson	Yamaha			10	
60 starters in total, 25 finishers

== 250 cc classification ==
Pos	No.	Rider	Manufacturer	Laps	Time	Grid	Points
1	6	(South Africa) Kork Ballington	Kawasaki	5	44:41.4	2	15
2	54	(Australia) Gregg Hansford	Kawasaki	5	+39.9	1	12
3	5	(United Kingdom) Tom Herron	Yamaha	5	+52.5	9	10
4	50	(France) Jean-François Baldé	Kawasaki	5	+52.7	3	8
5	59	(West Germany) Anton Mang	Kawasaki	5	+52.8		6
6	8	(South Africa) Jon Ekerold	Yamaha	5	+1:07.7	7	5
7	37	(United Kingdom) Chas Mortimer	Yamaha	5	+1:22.4		4
8	64	(France) Raymond Roche	Yamaha	5	+1:23.6	6	3
9	10	(France) Patrick Fernandez	Yamaha	5	+1:24.1	10	2
10	51	(France) Thierry Espié	Yamaha	5	+1:24.3		1
11	12	(France) Olivier Chevallier	Yamaha	5	+1:27.9		
12	3	(Italy) Walter Villa	Minarelli	5	+1:44.0		
13	33	(Sweden) Leif Gustafsson	Yamaha	5	+1:48.6		
14	13	(Australia) Vic Soussan	Yamaha	5	+1:48.9	4	
15	28	(Belgium) Richard Hubin	Yamaha	5	+1:49.5		
		(United States) Kenny Roberts	Yamaha			5	
		(France) Christian Estrosi	Yamaha			8	
50 starters in total, 36 finishers

== 125 cc classification ==
Pos	No.	Rider	Manufacturer	Laps	Time	Grid	Points
1	3	(Spain) Ángel Nieto	Minarelli	4	37:26.0	2	15
2	1	(France) Thierry Espié	Motobécane	4	+7.8	1	12
3	9	(Switzerland) Hans Müller	Morbidelli	4	+1:07.5	3	10
4	12	(Italy) Maurizio Massimiani	Morbidelli	4	+1:18.9	9	8
5	7	(Austria) Harald Bartol	Morbidelli	4	+1:19.0	10	6
6	6	(West Germany) Gert Bender	Bender	4	+1:22.5	4	5
7	8	(Switzerland) Stefan Dörflinger	Morbidelli	4	+1:22.8	6	4
8	2	(Italy) Eugenio Lazzarini	MBA	4	+1:23.8	5	3
9	19	(West Germany) Walter Koschine	Bender	4	+1:24.0	7	2
10	56	(West Germany) Stefan Janssen	Morbidelli	4	+1:26.9	8	1
11	32	(Netherlands) Henk van Kessel	Condor	4	+2:10.1		
12	16	(Finland) Matti Kinnunen	Morbidelli	4	+2:10.4		
13	20	(Switzerland) Rolf Blatter	Morbidelli	4	+2:10.9		
14	31	(Netherlands) Bennie Wilbers	Morbidelli	4	+2:11.3		
15	35	(West Germany) Richard Schmiederer	Morbidelli	4	+2:43.4		
43 starters in total, 30 finishers

== 50 cc classification ==
Pos	No.	Rider	Manufacturer	Laps	Time	Grid	Points
1	3	(Spain) Ricardo Tormo	Bultaco	3	31:00.3	1	15
2	1	(Spain) Ángel Nieto	Bultaco	3	+14.1	2	12
3	2	(Italy) Eugenio Lazzarini	Kreidler	3	+53.0	3	10
4	6	(Switzerland) Stefan Dörflinger	Kreidler	3	+1:30.2	4	8
5	37	(Switzerland) Rolf Blatter	Kreidler	3	+1:58.7	8	6
6	39	(West Germany) Wolfgang Müller	Kreidler	3	+2:00.3	5	5
7	13	(Netherlands) Theo Timmer	Kreidler	3	+2:05.3	10	4
8	60	(West Germany) Ingo Emmerich	Kreidler	3	+2:06.2	9	3
9	45	(West Germany) Reiner Scheidhauer	Kreidler	3	+2:07.2	7	2
10	28	(Netherlands) Henk van Kessel	Sparta	3	+2:26.3		1
11	63	(Italy) Claudio Lusuardi	MBH	3	+2:28.7		
12	21	(Italy) Enrico Cereda	Kreidler	3	+2:30.8		
13	12	(West Germany) Hagen Klein	Kreidler	3	+2:48.4		
14	31	(Belgium) Pierre Dumont	Kreidler	3	+2:48.6		
15	57	(West Germany) Richard Schmiederer	Kreidler	3	+2:51.1		
		(Netherlands) Peter Looyestein	Kreidler			6	
48 starters in total, 34 finishers

== Sidecar classification ==
Pos	No.	Rider	Passenger	Manufacturer	Laps	Time	Grid	Points
1	3	(West Germany) Werner Schwärzel	(West Germany) Andreas Huber	Fath	5	46:37.6	3	15
2	5	(France) Alain Michel	(United Kingdom) Stu Collins	Seymaz-Yamaha	5	+1:26.2	2	12
3	8	(United Kingdom) Dick Greasley	(United Kingdom) Gordon Russell	Busch-Yamaha	5	+1:26.8	5	10
4	10	(Switzerland) Bruno Holzer	(Switzerland) Karl Meierhans	LCR-Yamaha	5	+1:26.9		8
5	14	(Switzerland) Jean-François Monnin	(Switzerland) Paul Gerard	Seymaz-Yamaha	5	+2:20.3	6	6
6	37	(West Germany) Hermann Huber	(West Germany) Bernd Schappacher	König	5	+2:53.7	9	5
7	17	(Italy) Amedeo Zini	(Italy) Andrea Fornaro	Busch-König	5	+3:33.3		4
8	29	(United Kingdom) Bill Hodgkins	(United Kingdom) John Parkins	Windle-Yamaha	5	+3:36.0		3
9	47	(West Germany) Otto Haller	(West Germany) Rainer Gundel	MKM-Yamaha	5	+3:59.1		2
10	24	(Switzerland) Thomas Müller	(Switzerland) K. Waltisperg	TTM-Yamaha	5	+4:13.4	10	1
		(Switzerland) Rolf Biland	(United Kingdom) Kenny Williams	Beo-Yamaha			1	
		(United Kingdom) Jock Taylor	(United Kingdom) James Neil	Windle-Yamaha			4	
		(Switzerland) Hermann Schmid	(United Kingdom) Kenny Arthur	Schmid-Yamaha			7	
		(West Germany) Siegfried Schauzu	(West Germany) Lorenzo Puzo	Busch-Yamaha			8	
39 starters in total, 25 finishers

Previous race: 1978 British Grand Prix	FIM Grand Prix World Championship; 1978 season	Next race: 1978 Czechoslovak Grand Prix
Previous race: 1977 German Grand Prix	German Grand Prix	Next race: 1979 German Grand Prix
