= 1977 Isle of Man TT =

Isle of Man TT Mountain Course

The 1977 Isle of Man TT took place between 11 June – 17 June 1977, at the Snaefell Mountain Course. 1977 marked the beginning of an era as it was the first time the Isle of Man TT did not appear on the Grand Prix calendar. The event saw the return of Phil Read, who competed in his last TT races in 1972.

== Senior TT (500 cc) classification ==
Pos	No.	Rider	Manufacturer	Laps	Time
1	9	(United Kingdom) Phil Read	Suzuki	5	1:45:48.4
2	6	(United Kingdom) Tom Herron	Yamaha	5	+1:18.2
3	10	(United Kingdom) Eddie Roberts	Yamaha	5	+2:46.0
4	30	(United Kingdom) Joey Dunlop	Yamsel	5	+3:58.6
5	16	(United States) Pat Hennen	Suzuki	5	+4:09.2
6	42	(United Kingdom) Joe Lindsay	Yamsel	5	+4:28.6
7	4	(United Kingdom) Chas Mortimer	Yamaha	5	+4:38.6
8	32	(United Kingdom) Bill Smith	Suzuki	5	+5:09.4
9	11	(United Kingdom) Billy Guthrie	Yamaha	5	+5:48.6
10	29	(United Kingdom) James Scott	Yamaha	5	+6:05.4
73 starters in total, 36 finishers
Fastest lap : 20:34.6 (Phil Read)

== Junior TT (250 cc) classification ==
Pos	No.	Rider	Manufacturer	Laps	Time
1	3	(United Kingdom) Charlie Williams	Yamaha	3	1:08:10.0
2	7	(United Kingdom) Ian Richards	Yamaha	3	+8.8
3	8	(United Kingdom) Tom Herron	Yamaha	3	+1:13.0
4	12	(United Kingdom) Alex George	Yamaha	3	+1:48.0
5	15	(United Kingdom) Stan Woods	Yamaha	3	+2:05.4
6	6	(United Kingdom) Eddie Roberts	Yamaha	3	+2:23.4
7	10	(United Kingdom) Mick Grant	Kawasaki	3	+2:25.6
8	34	(United Kingdom) Clive Horton	Yamaha	3	+3:05.0
9	26	(United Kingdom) Joe Lindsay	Yamsel	3	+3:17.4
10	33	(United Kingdom) Joey Dunlop	Yamaha	3	+3:22.2
67 starters in total, 51 finishers
Fastest lap : 22:18.8 (Ian Richards)

== 1000 cc Classic TT classification ==
Pos	No.	Rider	Manufacturer	Laps	Time
1	6	(United Kingdom) Mick Grant	Kawasaki	6	2:02:37.4
2	12	(United Kingdom) Charlie Williams	Yamaha	6	+3:26.8
3	4	(United Kingdom) Eddie Roberts	Yamaha	6	+5:25.6
4	3	(United Kingdom) Chas Mortimer	Yamaha	6	+5:58.0
5	11	(United Kingdom) Bill Smith	Yamaha	6	+6:13.0
6	26	(United Kingdom) Stan Woods	Suzuki	6	+6:22.6
7	37	(United Kingdom) Joey Dunlop	Yamaha	6	+6:34.4
8	44	(United Kingdom) Steve Tonkin	Yamaha	6	+8:02.4
9	1	(United Kingdom) Steve Parrish	Suzuki	6	+8:10.8
10	10	(United Kingdom) Alex George	Yamaha	6	+8:26.0
71 starters in total, 30 finishers
Fastest lap : 20:04.4 (Mick Grant)

== Jubilee 1000 cc TT classification ==
Pos	No.	Rider	Manufacturer	Laps	Time
1	6	(United Kingdom) Joey Dunlop	Yamaha	4	1:23:10.6
2	16	(United Kingdom) George Fogarty	Suzuki	4	+51.6
3	10	(United Kingdom) Steve Tonkin	Yamaha	4	+1:20.4
4	11	(United Kingdom) Bill Smith	Suzuki	4	+1:37.4
5	24	(United Kingdom) Derek Huxley	Yamaha	4	+2:48.8
6	17	(United Kingdom) John Findlay	Yamaha	4	+3:24.6
7	2	(United Kingdom) Derek Chatterton	Suzuki	4	+3:26.8
8	23	(United Kingdom) Denis Casement	Yamaha	4	+3:51.2
9	5	(United Kingdom) Neil Tuxworth	Yamaha	4	+4:21.8
10	22	(United Kingdom) James Scott	Yamaha	4	+4:27.2
80 starters in total, 45 finishers
Fastest lap : 20:24.4 (Joey Dunlop)

== Formula One TT classification ==
Pos	No.	Rider	Manufacturer	Laps	Time
1	11	(United Kingdom) Phil Read	Honda	4	1:33:19.6
2	2	(United Kingdom) Roger Nicholls	Ducati	4	+38.4
3	3	(United Kingdom) Ian Richards	Honda	4	+3:26.4
4	12	(United Kingdom) Stan Woods	Honda	4	+3:49.4
5	16	(United Kingdom) Malcolm Lucas	BSA	4	+5:01.8
6	29	(United Kingdom) Michael Hunt	Laverda	4	+5:49.4
7	43	(United Kingdom) Roger Corbett	Triumph	4	+6:32.6
8	46	(United Kingdom) Ian Tomkinson	BSA	4	+8:21.6
9	31	(United Kingdom) John Kirkby	Laverda	4	+9:53.6
10	59	(United Kingdom) John Wilkinson	Suzuki	4	+9:59.6
49 starters in total, 32 finishers
Fastest lap : 22:15.0 (Phil Read)

== Formula Two TT classification ==
Pos	No.	Rider	Manufacturer	Laps	Time
1	8	(United Kingdom) Alan Jackson	Honda	4	1:31:08.0
2	3	(United Kingdom) Neil Tuxworth	Honda	4	+1:24.6
3	6	(United Kingdom) Denis Casement	Honda	4	+3:50.4
4	18	(United Kingdom) John Crick	Honda	4	+11:23.2
5	12	(United Kingdom) Dennis McMillan	Triumph	4	+12:29.4
6	14	(United Kingdom) Terry McKane	Honda	4	+15:45.0
7	19	(United Kingdom) Alistair Copland	Benelli	4	+16:44.8
8	21	(United Kingdom) Richard Arian	Honda	4	+22:41.0
14 starters in total, 8 finishers
Fastest lap : 22:22.8 (Alan Jackson)

== Formula Three TT classification ==
Pos	No.	Rider	Manufacturer	Laps	Time
1	45	(United Kingdom) John Kidson	Honda	4	1:37:04.4
2	64	(United Kingdom) Brian Peters	Suzuki	4	+5:15.0
3	66	(United Kingdom) Alan Walsh	Honda	4	+5:23.6
4	46	(United Kingdom) Graham Bentman	Honda	4	+6:04.8
5	49	(United Kingdom) Fred Launchbury	Maico	4	+7:12.2
6	40	(United Kingdom) Mal Kirwan	Honda	4	+7:53.0
7	48	(United Kingdom) Neville Watts	Honda	4	+10:34.6
8	55	(United Kingdom) Richard Stevens	Yamaha	4	+11:27.6
9	44	(United Kingdom) John Riley	Yamaha	4	+12:06.6
10	62	(United Kingdom) Paul Feist	Yamaha	4	+12:26.6
20 starters in total, 13 finishers
Fastest lap : 23:52.6 (John Kidson)

== 1000 cc Sidecar TT Race One classification ==
Pos	No.	Rider	Passenger	Manufacturer	Laps	Time
1	16	(United Kingdom) George O'Dell	(United Kingdom) Kenny Arthur	Windle-Yamaha	4	1:30:31.2
2	2	(United Kingdom) Dick Greasley	(United Kingdom) Mick Skeels	Chell-Yamaha	4	+50.0
3	3	(Germany) Rolf Steinhausen	(Germany) Wolfgang Kalauch	Busch-König	4	+1:46.2
4	5	(United Kingdom) Graham Milton	(United Kingdom) John Brushwood	British Magnum	4	+2:45.0
5	9	(United Kingdom) Mick Boddice	(United Kingdom) Chas Birks	Yamaha	4	+5:15.6
6	18	(United Kingdom) Bill Hodgkins	(United Kingdom) John Parkins	Francis-Yamaha	4	+7:45.6
7	33	(United Kingdom) George Oates	(United Kingdom) John Molyneux	Kawasaki	4	+7:48.4
8	24	(United Kingdom) Malcolm Aldrick	(United Kingdom) Paul Beasley	Revett-Yamaha	4	+11:55.6
9	59	(United Kingdom) Brian Mee	(United Kingdom) Alan Widdowson	Kawasaki	4	+12:18.4
10	53	(United Kingdom) Bill Hall	(United Kingdom) Peter Minion	Russell-Kawasaki	4	+12:53.6
68 starters in total, 36 finishers
Fastest lap : 22:01.2 (O'Dell/Arthur)

== 1000 cc Sidecar TT Race Two classification ==
Pos	No.	Rider	Passenger	Manufacturer	Laps	Time
1	1	(United Kingdom) Mac Hobson	(United Kingdom) Stu Collins	Yamaha	4	1:30:47.0
2	15	(Switzerland) Rolf Biland	(United Kingdom) Kenny Williams	Schmid-Yamaha	4	+59.8
3	3	(Germany) Rolf Steinhausen	(Germany) Wolfgang Kalauch	Busch-König	4	+1:03.0
4	2	(United Kingdom) Dick Greasley	(United Kingdom) Mick Skeels	Chell-Yamaha	4	+4:28.4
5	9	(United Kingdom) Mick Boddice	(United Kingdom) Chas Birks	Yamaha	4	+4:31.0
6	37	(United Kingdom) Graham Hilditch	(United Kingdom) Vince Biggs	Yamaha	4	+6:28.0
7	14	(United Kingdom) Steve Sinnott	(United Kingdom) Jim Williamson	Yamaha	4	+6:57.0
8	53	(United Kingdom) Bill Hall	(United Kingdom) Peter Minion	Kawasaki	4	+10:44.0
9	31	(United Kingdom) Reg Spooncer	(United Kingdom) Denis Smith	König	4	+12:05.6
10	67	(United Kingdom) Robert Philpott	(United Kingdom) Michael Buxton	Laverda	4	+12:11.4
61 starters in total, 25 finishers
Fastest lap : (Hobson/Collins)
