= 1977 Czechoslovak motorcycle Grand Prix =

Motorcycle race

(Czechoslovakia) 1977 Czechoslovak Grand Prix
Race details
- Race 12 of 13 races in the 1977 Grand Prix motorcycle racing season
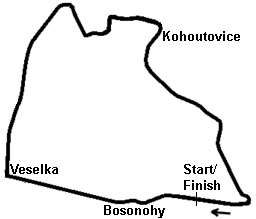
- Date: 7 August 1977
- Official name: Grand Prix ČSSR
- Location: Brno Circuit
- Course: Permanent racing facility; 10.920 km (6.785 mi)

500cc
Pole position
- Rider: (Venezuela) Johnny Cecotto
- Time: 3:29.710
Fastest lap
- Rider: (Venezuela) Johnny Cecotto
- Time: 3:29.690
Podium
- First: (Venezuela) Johnny Cecotto
- Second: (Italy) Giacomo Agostini
- Third: (France) Michel Rougerie

350cc
Pole position
- Rider: (Venezuela) Johnny Cecotto
- Time: 3:40.360
Fastest lap
- Rider: (Venezuela) Johnny Cecotto
- Time: 3:39.900
Podium
- First: (Venezuela) Johnny Cecotto
- Second: (United Kingdom) Tom Herron
- Third: (France) Christian Sarron

250cc
Pole position
- Rider: (Italy) Franco Uncini
- Time: 3:50.970
Fastest lap
- Rider: (Italy) Walter Villa
- Time: 3:46.890
Podium
- First: (Italy) Franco Uncini
- Second: (Italy) Walter Villa
- Third: (Italy) Mario Lega

Sidecar (B2A)
Pole position
- Rider: (West Germany) Werner Schwärzel
- Passenger: (West Germany) Andreas Huber
- Time: 3:51.300
Fastest lap
- Rider: (West Germany) Werner Schwärzel
- Passenger: (West Germany) Andreas Huber
- Time: 3:50.960
Podium
- First rider: (West Germany) Rolf Steinhausen
- First passenger: (West Germany) Wolfgang Kalauch
- Second rider: (West Germany) Siegfreid Schauzu
- Second passenger: Lorenzo Puzo
- Third rider: (United Kingdom) George O'Dell
- Third passenger: (United Kingdom) Cliff Holland

The 1977 Czechoslovak motorcycle Grand Prix was the twelfth round of the 1977 Grand Prix motorcycle racing season. It took place on 7 August 1977 at the Brno circuit. This would turn out to be 15-time World Champion Giacomo Agostini's last podium in Grand Prix racing.

== 500cc classification ==
Pos.	No.	Rider	Team	Manufacturer	Time/Retired	Points
1	11	(Venezuela) Johnny Cecotto	Team Venemotos	Yamaha	53'21.530	15
2	1	(Italy) Giacomo Agostini	Team API Marlboro	Yamaha	+25.680	12
3	49	(France) Michel Rougerie		Suzuki	+47.850	10
4	3	(United States) Pat Hennen	Texaco Heron Team Suzuki	Suzuki	+54.690	8
5	26	(Italy) Gianfranco Bonera	Team Nava Olio Fiat	Suzuki	+1'34.180	6
6	2	(Finland) Teuvo Länsivuori	Life Racing Team	Suzuki	+1'51.740	5
7	24	(United Kingdom) Steve Parrish	Texaco Heron Team Suzuki	Suzuki	+2'03.470	4
8	16	(Austria) Max Wiener	MSC Rottenberg	Suzuki	+2'37.910	3
9	43	(West Germany) Franz Rau		Suzuki	+3'11.860	2
10	18	(West Germany) Helmut Kassner	Boeri Giudici Racing Team	Suzuki	+3'13.140	1
11	14	(United Kingdom) Alex George	Hermetite Racing International	Suzuki	+3'33.160	
12	20	(Denmark) Børge Nielsen		Suzuki	+3'45.630	
13	29	(West Germany) Franz Heller	Bromme GMHH Suzuki Racing	Suzuki	+1 lap	
14	21	(Switzerland) Roland Freymond		Yamaha	+1 lap	
15	17	(Belgium) Jean-Marc Toffolo		Yamaha	+1 lap	
16	40	(Italy) Adelio Faccioli		Yamaha	+1 lap	
17	45	(Austria) Hans Braumandl	Team Nava Olio Fiat	Yamaha	+1 lap	
18	19	(Italy) Giorgio Gatti		Yamaha	+2 laps	
19	28	(Austria) Michael Schmid	Racing Team Albatros	Suzuki	+2 laps	
Ret	41	(Netherlands) Wil Hartog	Riemersma Racing	Suzuki	Retired	
Ret	9	(United Kingdom) John Williams	Team Appleby Glade	Suzuki	Retired	
Ret	18	(Netherlands) Boet van Dulmen	Pullshaw	Suzuki	Retired	
Ret	??	(Austria) Werner Nenning		Suzuki	Retired	
Ret	26	(Italy) Armando Toracca	MC della Robbia	Suzuki	Retired	
Ret	20	(Italy) Giovanni Rolando		Suzuki	Retired	
Ret	25	(United States) Steve Baker	Yamaha Motor Company	Yamaha	Retired	
Ret	4	(Italy) Marco Lucchinelli	Life Racing Team	Suzuki	Retired	
Ret	??	(Italy) Giuseppe Consalvi		Yamaha	Retired	
Ret	27	(Sweden) Bo Granath		Suzuki	Retired	
Ret	8	(Australia) Jack Findlay	Hermetite Racing International	Suzuki	Retired	
Ret	11	(Austria) Karl Auer	MSC Rottenberg	Yamaha	Retired	
Ret	18	(Italy) Virginio Ferrari	Team Nava Olio Fiat	Suzuki	Retired	
Ret	30	(Belgium) Jean-Philippe Orban	Jean-Philippe Orban Racing Team	Suzuki	Retired	
Ret	48	(West Germany) Harald Merkl	Nava Kucera Racing Team	Suzuki	Retired	
Ret	43	(Canada) Ron Kirkham		Yamaha	Retired	
Ret	43	(Norway) Odd Arne Lände		Suzuki	Retired	
Ret	35	(West Germany) Hans-Otto Buteneth		Yamaha	Retired	
Ret	35	(Czechoslovakia) Bohumil Staša		Yamaha	Retired	

== 350 cc classification ==
Pos	No.	Rider	Manufacturer	Laps	Time	Grid	Points
1	2	(Venezuela) Johnny Cecotto	Yamaha	14	51:51.38	1	15
2	4	(United Kingdom) Tom Herron	Yamaha	14	+54.72	4	12
3	22	(France) Christian Sarron	Yamaha	14	+1:05.52	5	10
4	14	(Finland) Pentti Korhonen	Yamaha	14	+1:10.00	14	8
5	6	(Spain) Víctor Palomo	Yamaha	14	+1:13.36	11	6
6	32	(Australia) Vic Soussan	Yamaha	14	+1:13.86	13	5
7	12	(South Africa) Kork Ballington	Yamaha	14	+1:38.32	7	4
8	28	(France) Michel Rougerie	Yamaha	14	+1:41.58	2	3
9	23	(South Africa) Jon Ekerold	Yamaha	14	+1:50.01		2
10	16	(Italy) Giacomo Agostini	Yamaha	14	+1:53.54	12	1
11	9	(France) Olivier Chevallier	Yamaha	14	+1:57.94	15	
12	34	(France) Jean-Claude Hogrel	Yamaha	14	+1:59.51		
13	47	(Czechoslovakia) Peter Baláž	Yamaha	14	+3:09.06	17	
14	46	(United Kingdom) Alex George	Yamaha	14	+3:10.24		
15	33	(Denmark) Børge Nielsen	Yamaha	14	+3:31.89		
16	43	(Australia) Jack Findlay	Yamaha	14	+3:50.54		
17	26	(Sweden) Bo Granath	Yamaha	14	+3:51.07		
18	36	(Austria) Grund Hartmann	Yamaha	13	+1 lap		
19	11	(Germany) Franz Rau	Yamaha	13	+1 lap		
20	24	(Switzerland) Franz Meier	Yamaha	13	+1 lap		
21	39	(Italy) Georg Gatti	Yamaha	13	+1 lap		
		(Finland) Pekka Nurmi	Yamaha			3	
		(Italy) Franco Uncini	Harley-Davidson			6	
		(France) Jean-François Baldé	Yamaha			8	
		(France) Patrick Fernandez	Yamaha			9	
		(France) Patrick Pons	Yamaha			10	
		(South Africa) Alan North	Yamaha			16	
45 starters in total

== 250 cc classification ==
Pos	No.	Rider	Manufacturer	Laps	Time	Grid	Points
1	21	(Italy) Franco Uncini	Harley-Davidson	13	49:58.89	1	15
2	1	(Italy) Walter Villa	Harley-Davidson	13	+0.41	2	12
3	29	(Italy) Mario Lega	Morbidelli	13	+23.84	3	10
4	15	(South Africa) Kork Ballington	Yamaha	13	+25.45	4	8
5	5	(United Kingdom) Tom Herron	Yamaha	13	+25.91	19	6
6	22	(South Africa) Alan North	Yamaha	13	+56.98	7	5
7	16	(South Africa) Jon Ekerold	Yamaha	13	+1:01.50	15	4
8	12	(France) Patrick Fernandez	Yamaha	13	+1:03.46	17	3
9	9	(France) Olivier Chevallier	Yamaha	13	+1:04.12	16	2
10	40	(France) Guy Bertin	Yamaha	13	+1:04.81	12	1
11	41	(Hungary) János Drapál	Yamaha	13	+1:13.22	11	
12	34	(Venezuela) Aldo Nannini	Yamaha	13	+1:19.57	5	
13	11	(Australia) John Dodds	Yamaha	13	+1:24.75		
14	8	(Czechoslovakia) Peter Baláž	Jawa	13	+1:30.78	14	
15	18	(France) Jean-François Baldé	Yamaha	13	+1:45.99	13	
16	33	(Japan) Ken Nemoto	Yamaha	13	+1:46.63		
17	25	(Italy) Sauro Pazzaglia	Yamaha	13	+3:10.10		
18	42	(Hungary) István Holmár	Yamaha	13	+3:10.94		
19	43	(Hungary) János Vlaszati	Yamaha	13	+3:19.70		
20	28	(Austria) Edi Stöllinger	Yamaha	13	+3:46.86		
21	44	(Poland) Ryszard Mankiewitz	Yamaha	13	+4:11.19		
22	50	(Czechoslovakia) Oldrich Kába	Jawa	12	+1 lap		
23	45	(Czechoslovakia) Ondrej Szymanski	Yamaha	12	+1 lap		
		(Finland) Pentti Korhonen	Yamaha			6	
		(Australia) Vic Soussan	Yamaha			8	
		(Finland) Pekka Nurmi	Yamaha			9	
		(United Kingdom) Mick Grant	Kawasaki			10	
		(France) Patrick Pons	Yamaha			18	
43 starters in total

== Sidecar classification ==
Pos	No.	Rider	Passenger	Manufacturer	Laps	Time	Grid	Points
1	1	(Germany) Rolf Steinhausen	(Germany) Wolfgang Kalauch	Busch-Yamaha	12	48:01.58	4	15
2	5	(Germany) Siegfried Schauzu	(Germany) Lorenzo Puzo	Yamaha	12	+45.13	5	12
3	8	(United Kingdom) George O'Dell	(United Kingdom) Cliff Holland	Windle-Yamaha	12	+46.14	9	10
4	4	(Switzerland) Rolf Biland	(United Kingdom) Kenny Williams	Schmid-Yamaha	12	+1:29.20	7	8
5	12	(United Kingdom) Mac Hobson	(United Kingdom) Stu Collins	Suzuki	12	+1:56.57		6
6	7	(United Kingdom) Dick Greasley	(United Kingdom) Mick Skeels	Chell-Yamaha	12	+1:56.82	11	5
7	6	(Germany) Helmut Schilling	(Germany) Rainer Gundel	Aro	12	+2:46.24	3	4
8	17	(Italy) Amedeo Zini	(Italy) Andreas Fornaro	König	12	+3:17.30		3
9	21	(Germany) Heinz Luthringshauser	(Germany) Helmut Hahn	MKM	11	+1 lap		2
10	15	(Germany) Gustav Pape	(Germany) Franz Kallenberg	König	11	+1 lap		1
11	27	(Austria) Herbert Prügl	(Austria) Hans Kussberger	Rotax	11	+1 lap		
12	32	(Switzerland) Ernst Trachsel	(Switzerland) "Agner"	Yamaha	11	+1 lap		
13	18	(Switzerland) Hans-Peter Hubacher	(Switzerland) Pudu Dudach	Yamaha	11	+1 lap		
14	33	(Germany) Heinz Thevissen	(Germany) Erich Schmitz	König	8	+4 laps		
15	3	(Switzerland) Hermann Schmid	(United Kingdom) Kenny Arthur	Schmid-Yamaha	7	+5 laps	2	
		(Germany) Werner Schwärzel	(Germany) Andreas Huber	Aro			1	
		(France) Alain Michel	(France) Gérard Lecorre	Yamaha			6	
		(Sweden) Göte Brodin	(Sweden) Bengt Forsberg	Windle-Yamaha			8	
		(Switzerland) Bruno Holzer	(Switzerland) "Tschunko"	LCR-Yamaha			10	
		(Netherlands) Cees Smit	(Netherlands) Jan Smit	König			12	
26 starters in total

Previous race: 1977 Finnish Grand Prix	FIM Grand Prix World Championship; 1977 season	Next race: 1977 British Grand Prix
Previous race: 1976 Czechoslovak Grand Prix	Czechoslovak Grand Prix	Next race: 1978 Czechoslovak Grand Prix
