= 1977 British motorcycle Grand Prix =

(United Kingdom) 1977 British Grand Prix
Race details
- Race 13 of 13 races in the 1977 Grand Prix motorcycle racing season
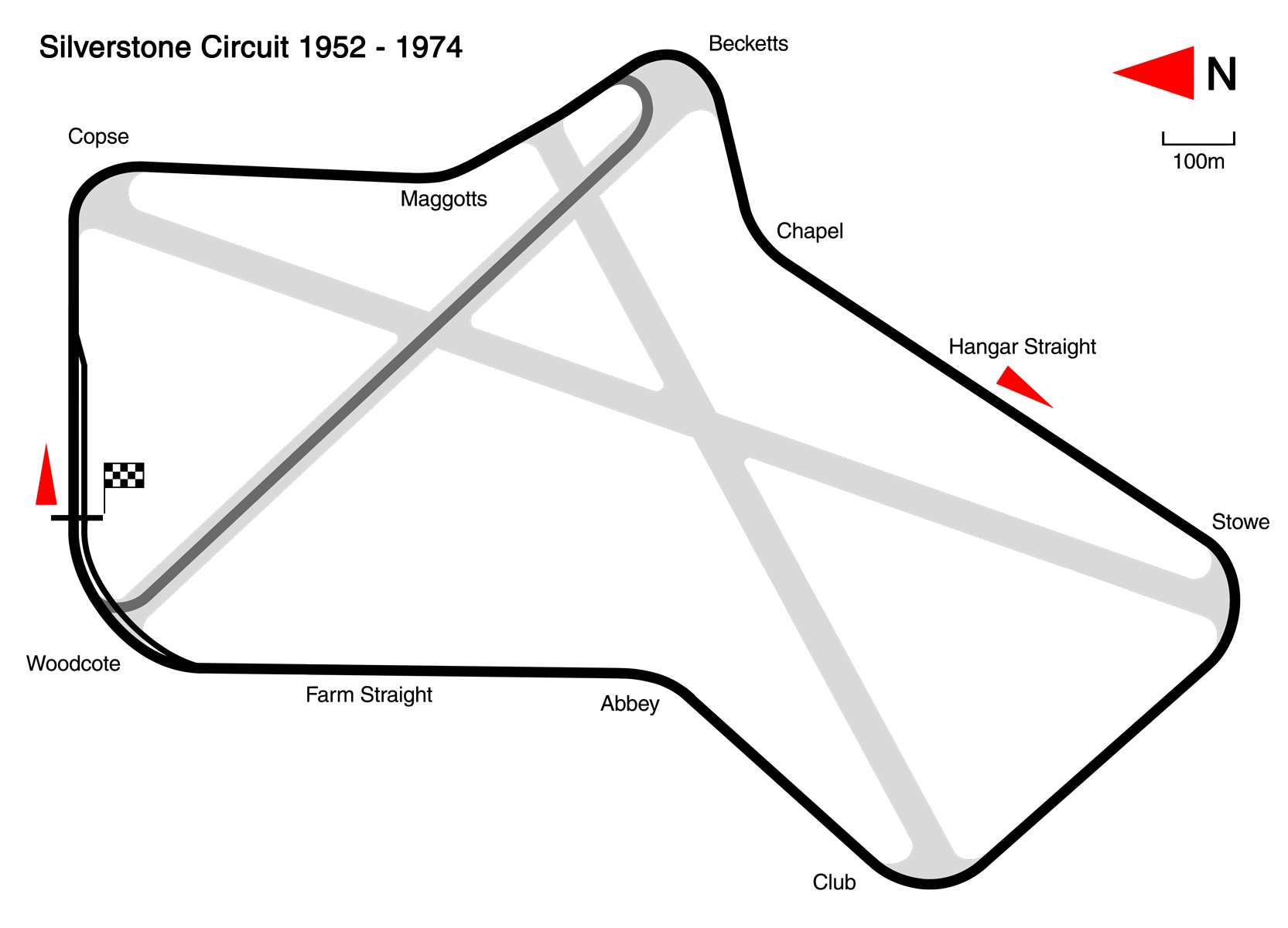
- Date: 13–14 August 1977
- Official name: John Player British Grand Prix
- Location: Silverstone Circuit
- Course: Permanent racing facility; 4.711 km (2.927 mi)

500cc
Pole position
- Rider: (United Kingdom) Barry Sheene
- Time: 1:32.990
Fastest lap
- Rider: (United Kingdom) Steve Parrish
- Time: 1:34.270
Podium
- First: (United States) Pat Hennen
- Second: (United States) Steve Baker
- Third: (Finland) Teuvo Länsivuori

350cc
Pole position
- Rider: (South Africa) Kork Ballington
- Time: 1:35.770
Fastest lap
- Rider: (South Africa) Kork Ballington
- Time: 1:36.060
Podium
- First: (South Africa) Kork Ballington
- Second: (France) Olivier Chevallier
- Third: (United Kingdom) John Williams

250cc
Pole position
- Rider: (Japan) Takazumi Katayama
- Time: 1:38.290
Fastest lap
- Rider: (France) Eric Saul
- Time: 1:38.270
Podium
- First: (South Africa) Kork Ballington
- Second: (Venezuela) Aldo Nannini
- Third: (France) Eric Saul

125cc
Pole position
- Rider: (Austria) Harald Bartol
- Time: 1:45.650
Fastest lap
- Rider: (Italy) Eugenio Lazzarini
- Time: 1:44.780
Podium
- First: (Italy) Pierluigi Conforti
- Second: (Italy) Eugenio Lazzarini
- Third: (France) Jean-Louis Guignabodet

Sidecar (B2A)
Pole position
- Rider: (Switzerland) Rolf Biland
- Passenger: (United Kingdom) Kenny Williams
- Time: 1:39.860
Fastest lap
- Rider: (West Germany) Werner Schwärzel
- Passenger: (West Germany) Andreas Huber
- Time: 1:57.180
Podium
- First rider: (West Germany) Werner Schwärzel
- First passenger: (West Germany) Andreas Huber
- Second rider: (West Germany) Rolf Steinhausen
- Second passenger: (West Germany) Wolfgang Kalauch
- Third rider: (United Kingdom) George O'Dell
- Third passenger: (United Kingdom) Cliff Holland

The 1977 British motorcycle Grand Prix was the thirteenth and final round of the 1977 Grand Prix motorcycle racing season. It took place on 13–14 August 1977 at Silverstone Circuit.

1977 marked the beginning of a new era, as it was the first time the event was held on the British mainland after the Isle of Man TT had represented the United Kingdom on the FIM Grand Prix calendar for the previous 28 years since the championship's inception in 1949. Once the most prestigious race of the year, the Isle of Man TT had been increasingly boycotted by the top riders, and finally succumbed to pressure for increased safety in racing events. It was also the final grand prix for 15-time world champion Giacomo Agostini.

Steve Parrish retired from the lead after his teammate and close friend Barry Sheene famously wrote "gas it wanker" on a pitboard.

== 500cc classification ==
Pos.	No.	Rider	Team	Manufacturer	Time/Retired	Points
1	3	(United States) Pat Hennen	Texaco Heron Team Suzuki	Suzuki	45'31.960	15
2	32	(United States) Steve Baker	Yamaha Motor Company	Yamaha	+41.590	12
3	2	(Finland) Teuvo Länsivuori	Life Racing Team	Suzuki	+1'02.790	10
4	13	(Italy) Gianfranco Bonera	Team Nava Olio Fiat	Suzuki	+1'22.960	8
5	35	(United Kingdom) Steve Wright		Suzuki	+1 lap	6
6	24	(United Kingdom) Alex George	Hermetite Racing International	Suzuki	+1 lap	5
7	28	(United Kingdom) Derek Chatterton		Suzuki	+1 lap	4
8	46	(Austria) Max Wiener	MSC Rottenberg	Suzuki	+1 lap	3
9	10	(Italy) Giacomo Agostini	Team API Marlboro	Yamaha	+1 lap	2
10	31	(United Kingdom) Kevin Wrettom		Suzuki	+1 lap	1
11	37	(West Germany) Helmut Kassner	Boeri Giudici Racing Team	Suzuki	+2 laps	
12	42	(West Germany) Franz Meier		Yamaha	+2 laps	
13	43	(Norway) Odd Arne Lände		Suzuki	+2 laps	
Ret	9	(United Kingdom) John Williams	Team Appleby Glade	Suzuki	Accident	
Ret	24	(United Kingdom) Steve Parrish	Texaco Heron Team Suzuki	Suzuki	Accident	
Ret	41	(Netherlands) Wil Hartog	Riemersma Racing	Suzuki	Retired	
Ret	7	(United Kingdom) Barry Sheene	Texaco Heron Team Suzuki	Suzuki	Retired	
Ret	??	(Belgium) Hervé Regout	Hervé Regout	Suzuki	Retired	
Ret	15	(France) Christian Estrosi	Marlboro Masche Total	Suzuki	Accident	
Ret	42	(New Zealand) Stuart Avant	Sid Griffiths Racing	Suzuki	Retired	
Ret	49	(France) Michel Rougerie		Suzuki	Retired	
Ret	??	(France) Jean-Paul Boinet		Suzuki	Retired	
Ret	11	(Venezuela) Johnny Cecotto	Team Venemotos	Yamaha	Retired	
Ret	18	(Netherlands) Boet van Dulmen	Pullshaw	Suzuki	Retired	
Ret	20	(New Zealand) John Woodley		Suzuki	Retired	
Ret	11	(Australia) Warren Willing		Yamaha	Retired	
Ret	??	(United Kingdom) George Fogarty		Suzuki	Retired	
Ret	34	(South Africa) Leslie van Breda		Suzuki	Accident	
Ret	??	(United Kingdom) John Weeden		Suzuki	Retired	
Ret	??	(United Kingdom) Steve Manship		Suzuki	Retired	
Ret	20	(Denmark) Børge Nielsen		Yamaha	Retired	
Ret	??	(Denmark) Kaj Jensen		Yamaha	Retired	
Ret	43	(West Germany) Franz Rau		Suzuki	Retired	
Ret	??	(Netherlands) Kees van der Kruijs		Yamaha	Retired	
Ret	6	(United Kingdom) John Newbold	Maurice Newbold	Suzuki	Retired	
Ret	8	(Australia) Jack Findlay	Hermetite Racing International	Suzuki	Retired	
Ret	??	(United Kingdom) Ron Haslam		Suzuki	Accident	

== 350 cc classification ==
Pos	No.	Rider	Manufacturer	Laps	Time	Grid	Points
1	11	(South Africa) Kork Ballington	Yamaha	28	45:32.10	1	15
2	9	(France) Olivier Chevallier	Yamaha	28	+16.31	9	12
3	32	(United Kingdom) John Williams	Yamaha	28	+16.42	10	10
4	34	(United Kingdom) Eddie Roberts	Yamaha	28	+24.52	2	8
5	42	(United Kingdom) Alan Stewart	Yamaha	28	+29.55		6
6	28	(Finland) Pekka Nurmi	Yamaha	28	+38.19	8	5
7	29	(Switzerland) Michel Frutschi	Yamaha	28	+54.84		4
8	44	(Germany) Helmut Kassner	Yamaha	28	+1:03.90		3
9	49	(Finland) Eero Hyvärinen	Yamaha	28	+1:08.19		2
10	33	(United Kingdom) Austin Hockley	Yamaha	28	+1:23.29		1
11	47	(France) Alain Terras	Yamaha	27	+1 lap		
12	5	(Australia) John Dodds	Yamaha	27	+1 lap	14	
13	24	(South Africa) Les van Breda	Yamaha	27	+1 lap		
14	46	(United Kingdom) Graham Hobbs	Yamaha	27	+1 lap		
15	12	(Finland) Reino Eskelinen	Yamaha	27	+1 lap		
16	40	(Denmark) Kaj Jensen	Yamaha	26	+2 laps		
		(Venezuela) Johnny Cecotto	Yamaha			3	
		(United Kingdom) Tom Herron	Yamaha			4	
		(France) Christian Sarron	Yamaha			5	
		(South Africa) Jon Ekerold	Yamaha			6	
		(South Africa) Alan North	Yamaha			7	
		(Australia) Vic Soussan	Yamaha			11	
		(France) Patrick Pons	Yamaha			12	
		(France) Michel Rougerie	Yamaha			13	
		(France) Patrick Fernandez	Yamaha			15	
		(Italy) Giacomo Agostini	Yamaha			16	
		(France) Bernard Fau	Yamaha			17	
		(Spain) Víctor Palomo	Yamaha			18	
		(United Kingdom) Chas Mortimer	Yamaha			19	
		(Japan) Ken Nemoto	Yamaha			20	
46 starters in total

== 250 cc classification ==
Pos	No.	Rider	Manufacturer	Laps	Time	Grid	Points
1	20	(South Africa) Kork Ballington	Yamaha	26	43:37.08	17	15
2	47	(Venezuela) Aldo Nannini	Yamaha	26	+2.47	5	12
3	25	(France) Eric Saul	Yamaha	26	+4.85	8	10
4	13	(Italy) Franco Uncini	Harley-Davidson	26	+13.66	4	8
5	8	(France) Olivier Chevallier	Yamaha	26	+13.66	7	6
6	21	(Australia) Vic Soussan	Yamaha	26	+13.81	11	5
7	22	(France) Guy Bertin	Yamaha	26	+22.20	12	4
8	36	(Finland) Pekka Nurmi	Yamaha	26	+24.42		3
9	1	(Italy) Walter Villa	Harley-Davidson	26	+26.32	15	2
10	23	(France) Patrick Pons	Yamaha	26	+34.56	19	1
11	19	(United Kingdom) Eddie Roberts	Yamaha	26	+34.66		
12	27	(Switzerland) Michel Frutschi	Yamaha	26	+1:03.64		
13	41	(United Kingdom) Alan Stewart	Yamaha	26	+1:03.82		
14	16	(France) Jean-Claude Meilland	Yamaha	26	+1:16.74		
15	26	(France) Denis Boulom	Yamaha	26	+1:37.21		
16	34	(Finland) Seppo Rossi	Yamaha	26	+1:37.21		
17	39	(United Kingdom) John Weeden	Yamaha	26	+1:37.86		
18	28	(United Kingdom) Ian Richards	Yamaha	25	+1 lap		
19	45	(United Kingdom) Graham Hobbs	Yamaha	25	+1 lap		
20	38	(Australia) Warren Willing	Yamaha	25	+1 lap		
21	4	(Canada) Ron Kirkham	Yamaha	24	+2 laps		
		(Japan) Takazumi Katayama	Yamaha			1	
		(United Kingdom) Tom Herron	Yamaha			2	
		(United Kingdom) Mick Grant	Kawasaki			3	
		(South Africa) Alan North	Yamaha			6	
		(South Africa) Jon Ekerold	Yamaha			9	
		(Switzerland) Hans Müller	Yamaha			10	
		(France) Christian Sarron	Yamaha			13	
		(France) Bernard Fau	Yamaha			14	
		(France) Patrick Fernandez	Yamaha			16	
		(United Kingdom) Barry Ditchburn	Kawasaki			18	
48 starters in total

== 125 cc classification ==
Pos	No.	Rider	Manufacturer	Laps	Time	Grid	Points
1	12	(Italy) Pierluigi Conforti	Morbidelli	24	42:46.53	7	15
2	7	(Italy) Eugenio Lazzarini	Morbidelli	24	+2.02	2	12
3	6	(France) Jean-Louis Guignabodet	Morbidelli	24	+16.01	6	10
4	16	(Switzerland) Hans Müller	Morbidelli	24	+28.89	4	8
5	8	(Germany) Gert Bender	Bender	24	+33.46	11	6
6	9	(Switzerland) Stefan Dörflinger	Morbidelli	24	+41.63	3	5
7	28	(France) Thierry Noblesse	Morbidelli	24	+42.22	9	4
8	5	(Germany) Anton Mang	Morbidelli	24	+42.58	12	3
9	34	(Sweden) Bengt Johansson	Morbidelli	24	+57.98	17	2
10	10	(Belgium) Julien van Zeebroeck	Motobécane	24	+1:00.76	13	1
11	15	(Italy) Ermanno Giuliano	Morbidelli	24	+1:01.42	10	
12	50	(France) Patrick Plisson	Morbidelli	24	+1:08.48	8	
13	17	(Sweden) Per-Edward Carlson	Morbidelli	24	+1:18.78	19	
14	20	(France) Laurent Gomis	Morbidelli	24	+1:32.59	16	
15	26	(Italy) Maurizio Massimiani	Morbidelli	24	+1:33.38	15	
16	33	(Italy) Enrico Cereda	Morbidelli	24	+1:40.19	18	
17	3	(United Kingdom) Clive Horton	Maico	24	+1:40.40		
18	18	(Finland) Matti Kinnunen	Morbidelli	24	+1:41.46	20	
19	32	(France) Claude Wilette	Morbidelli	24	+1:41.93		
20	38	(Germany) Alfred Schmid	Morbidelli	24	+1:44.74		
		(Austria) Harald Bartol	Morbidelli			1	
		(France) Thierry Espié	Motobécane			5	
		(Italy) Sauro Pazzaglia	Morbidelli			14	
41 starters in total, 28 finishers

== Sidecar classification ==
Pos	No.	Rider	Passenger	Manufacturer	Laps	Time	Grid	Points
1	2	(Germany) Werner Schwärzel	(Germany) Andreas Huber	Aro	27	53:53.94	2	15
2	1	(Germany) Rolf Steinhausen	(Germany) Wolfgang Kalauch	Busch-Yamaha	27	+39.90	10	12
3	8	(United Kingdom) George O'Dell	(United Kingdom) Cliff Holland	Windle-Yamaha	27	+1:25.25	3	10
4	17	(Sweden) Göte Brodin	(Sweden) Bengt Forsberg	Windle-Yamaha	27	+1:35.09	5	8
5	19	(Switzerland) Jean-François Monnin	(Switzerland) Edouard Weber	Seymaz-Yamaha	27	+1:51.05	11	6
6	18	(Germany) Walter Ohrmann	(Germany) Bernd Grube	Yamaha	26	+1 lap		5
7	33	(United Kingdom) Mick Boddice	(United Kingdom) Chas Birks	Yamaha	26	+1 lap		4
8	4	(Switzerland) Rolf Biland	(United Kingdom) Kenny Williams	Schmid-Yamaha	26	+1 lap	1	3
9	6	(Germany) Helmut Schilling	(Germany) Rainer Gundel	Aro	26	+1 lap	9	2
10	27	(France) Yvan Trolliet	(France) Pierre Muller	Yamaha	26	+1 lap	12	1
11	11	(Switzerland) Bruno Holzer	(United Kingdom) Don Williams	LCR-Yamaha	26	+1 lap	13	
12	5	(Germany) Siegfried Schauzu	(Germany) Lorenzo Puzo	Yamaha	26	+1 lap	15	
13	12	(United Kingdom) Mac Hobson	(United Kingdom) Stu Collins	Suzuki	25	+2 laps	8	
14	20	(United Kingdom) Jeff Gawley	(United Kingdom) Ken Birch	Fowler-Yamaha	25	+2 laps		
15	7	(United Kingdom) Dick Greasley	(United Kingdom) Mick Skeels	Chell-Yamaha	24	+3 laps	6	
		(Switzerland) Hermann Schmid	(United Kingdom) Kenny Arthur	Schmid-Yamaha			4	
		(France) Alain Michel	(France) Gérard Lecorre	Yamaha			7	
		(Netherlands) Cees Smit	(Netherlands) Jan Smit	König			14	
31 starters in total, 31 finishers

Previous race: 1977 Czechoslovak Grand Prix	FIM Grand Prix World Championship; 1977 season	Next race: 1978 Venezuelan Grand Prix
Previous race: 1976 Isle of Man TT	British Grand Prix	Next race: 1978 British Grand Prix
