= Kenneth Andrews =

Kenneth Andrews may refer to:

- Kenneth Andrews (sociologist), professor of sociology at the University of North Carolina at Chapel Hill
- Kenneth R. Andrews (1916–2005), academic who wrote and thought on business policy or corporate strategy at the Harvard Business School
- Kenneth Andrews (historian) (1921–2012), British historian
- Kenny Andrews (born 1947), British motorcycle sidecar racing champion
- Ken Andrews (born 1967), American musician
