= Sidecar World Championship =

Sidecar championship circuits

FIM Sidecar World Championship
- Category: Motorcycle racing
- Country: International
- Inaugural season: 1949; 77 years ago
- Teams: 17
- Constructors: Kawasaki; Yamaha; Suzuki
- Riders' champion: Sam Christie; Tom Christie
- Makes' champion: LCR-Yamaha YZF-R6
- Official website: https://www.fim-moto.com/en/sports/view/fim-sidecar-world-championship-4332

FIM Sidecar World Championship is the international sidecar racing championship. It is the only remaining original FIM road racing championship class that started in 1949.

It was formerly named Superside when the sidecars moved from being part of Grand Prix Motorcycles racing to being support events for the Superbike World Championship. In 2010 the FIM took over the management of the series from the Superside promoters, and the championship was called "FIM Sidecar World Championship". However, the FIM still uses the word Superside for promotion purposes, despite the demise of the Superside promoters.

The championship is raced over a number of rounds at circuits mainly in Europe, although other venues have been included in United States at Laguna Seca, South Africa at Kyalami and Australia's Phillip Island.

== History ==
=== Formative years ===
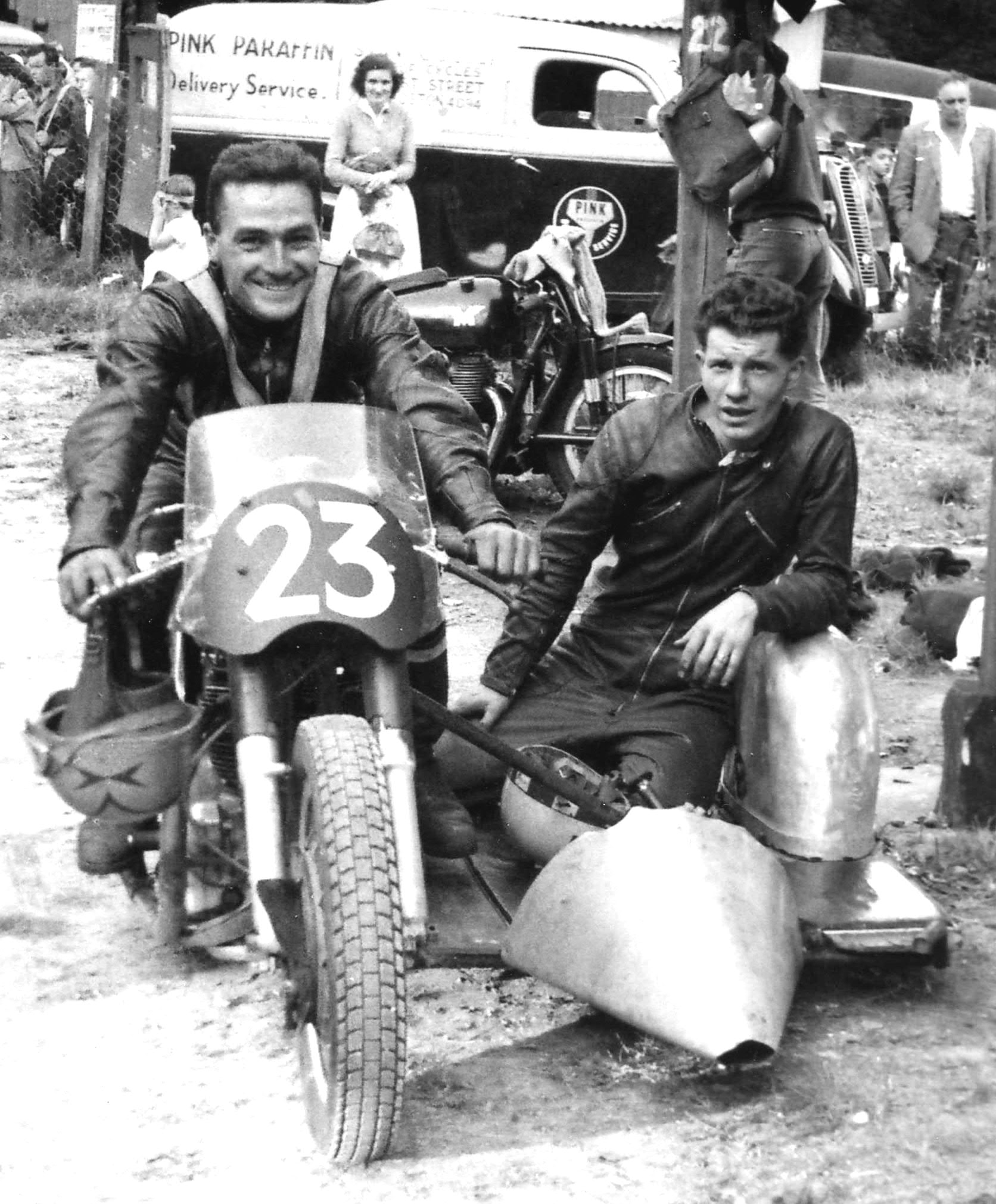
Chris Vincent on the Norton-BSA outfit he used for 1958 in grasstrack and 1959 for road racing, just by changing the tyre tread, a low sitter achieved by 16 inch wheels instead of 19 and showing an early version of the passenger platform which endured until the late 1970s

When the sidecar world championships began in 1949, they were dominated by unambiguous, orthodox outfits where a sidecar was attached to a conventional solo motorcycle. Rigidity and strength were poorly understood and pre-war machines have been described as "scaffolding on wheels". Development was based around cutting weight, providing a flat platform for the passenger, and reducing drag around the sidecar wheel and at the front of the sidecar platform. When developments in dolphin and dustbin fairings on solo machines proved successful at reducing drag, it was natural to adapt similar streamlined enclosures for the sidecar outfits. A pioneer in this area was Eric Oliver who worked with the Watsonian company on the development of successive experimental racing outfits including such innovations as the use of 16 in (410 mm) diameter wheels.

=== Design changes ===
By 1953, motorcycle frames had undergone a complete redesign to accommodate the side car. Seat heights had been reduced to the point where the driver now sat in a semi-prone position. This permitted the use of a one-piece fairing which enclosed the front of the outfit as well as the sidecar platform. The enclosure led to unfamiliar handling, and the advanced design was only used in practice for the Belgian Grand Prix and in the final Grand Prix at Monza, where it finished fourth in the hands of Jacques Drion and Inge Stoll. Throughout the year, other outfits experimented with more modest refinements such as additional braking via the sidecar wheel, sometimes linked to one or both of the other two brakes.

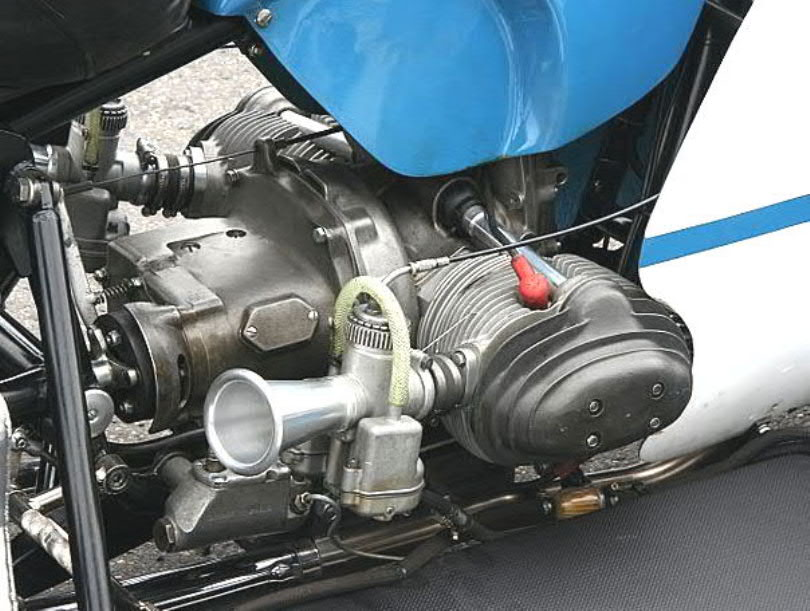
BMW RS54 Rennsport 500 cc engine as installed in a modern replica of Max Deubel's 1960s low sitter

Nevertheless, racing sidecars remained intrinsically the same to road-going sidecars. A traditional racing outfit was a road-going motorcycle outfit without the boot and with the suspension lowered. The bootless sidecar frame would have a flat platform. Both the battery and the fuel tank could be placed either between the motorcycle and the sidecar, or on the sidecar platform. Over time the subframe, struts, clamps, sidecar frame, etc. would merge with the motorcycle mainframe and form a single frame. But essentially the racing outfit was still a variant of the road-going outfit in principle.

=== Technical innovation ===
Beginning in 1977 there was a seismic shift away from the traditional engineering that had underscored sidecar technology up to this point. It began when George O'Dell won the championship using a Hub-center steering sidecar (built by Rolf Biland) called the Seymaz. O'Dell won despite the Seymaz being rarely raced during the season in favor of using a traditional Windle frame for much of the year. The next year Rolf Biland won the 1978 championship using a BEO-Yamaha TZ500 sidecar which was basically a rear-engine, rear-drive trike.

In 1979 the FIM responded to these technological innovations by splitting the sidecar championship into two competitions:

- B2A - traditional sidecars
- B2B - prototypes

Bruno Holzer won the B2B championship with an LCR BEO-Yamaha sidecar that turned motorcycling into something more like driving a car because the machine had a driver's seat, steering wheel and using foot pedals. It also did not require much participation from the sidecar passenger who just had to lie flat on the passenger platform.

In 1980, due to the revolutionary changes being made by the constructors to their designs, the FIM banned all sidecar prototypes because it was concerned that the developments were turning passengers into non-active participants, and the machines were ceasing to resemble motorcycles.

However, a year later FIM reversed its decision and reached a compromise after protests from the teams. Prototypes would be permitted to race subject to the following rules:

- it must be a vehicle that is driven only by a single rear wheel
- it must be steered by a single front wheel
- it must be steered by a motorcycle handle bar not a steering wheel
- it must require the active participation from the passenger.

The 1981 rules remain largely unchanged. For example, trikes or cyclecars are still banned. However, there have been a few amendments and easing of the rules. In the late 1990s the FIM allowed a sidecar front wheel to have automobile-style suspension (e.g. wishbone configurations. Likewise sidecars that are outside of the technical rules are permitted to compete in races but their results, points or finishes are not recorded. An example is the Markus Bösiger/Jürg Egli team who would have finished third in the 1998 championship season. However, as they were using a configuration where Bösiger sat in an upright driving position no results were entered in the official records.

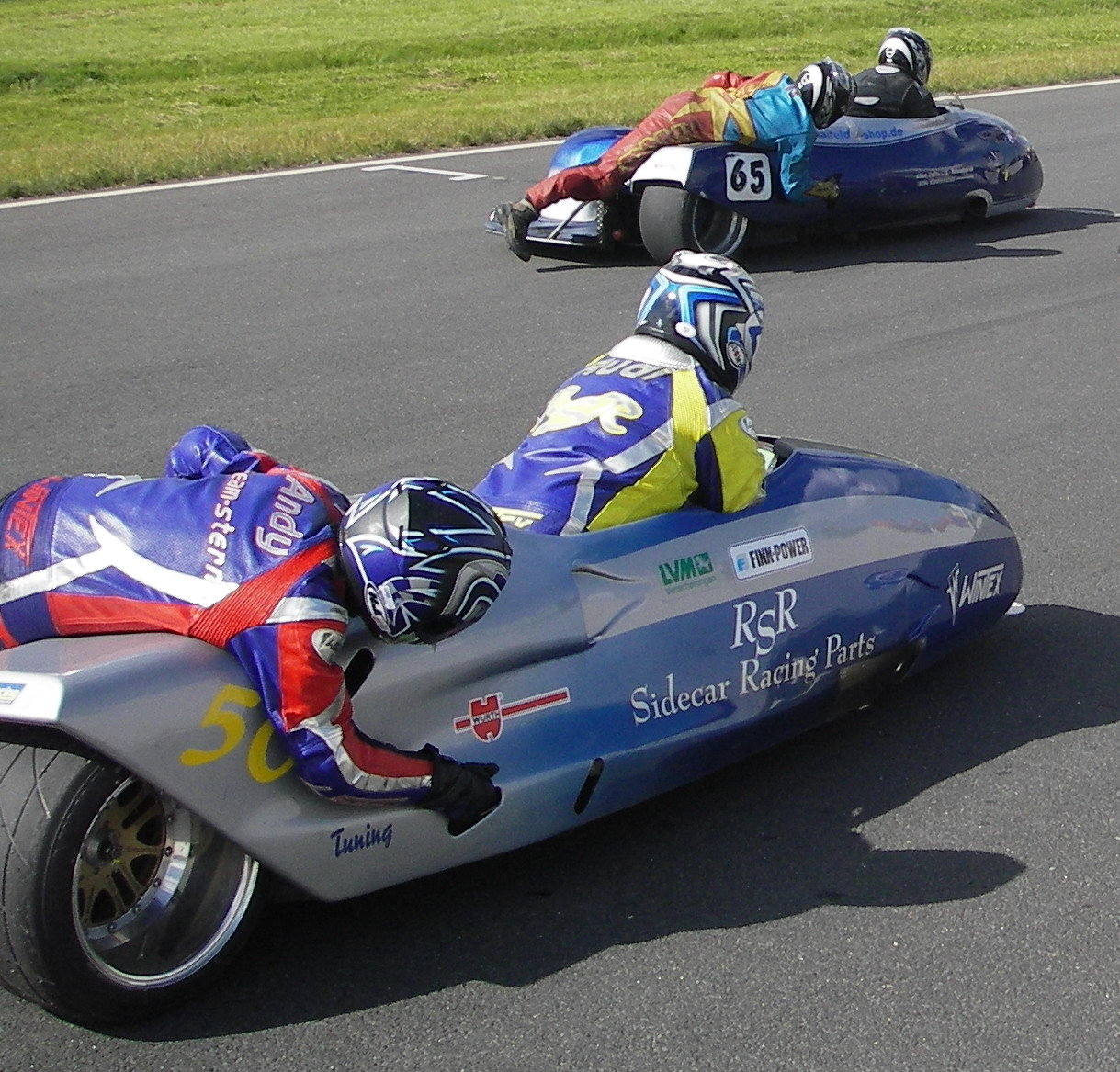
Sidecars on starting grid

Under FIM regulations, "rider" applies equally to the driver and the passenger on a sidecar. The driver is positioned kneeling in front of the engine with hands near the front wheel, while the passenger moves about the platform at the rear transferring their weight from left to right according to the corner and forward or back to gain traction for the front or rear. The passenger also helps the driver when it comes to drifting, and is also usually the first person to notice any engine problems since he is next to the engine while the driver is in front of it. The two must work together to be a successful team. Nowadays it is common to call the driver the "Pilot", while the passenger has several nicknames: the "Acrobat" used in North America which is no longer in use, and the now common term "Monkey" which originated from Australia. Occasionally the words "Co-Driver" or "Co-Pilot" are also used.

Traditional sidecar racing remain popular in several countries, especially the United Kingdom, where it known as Formula Two Sidecars (600cc Engines). They are generally uses in true road racing events like the Isle of Man TT races. Despite their lower top speeds, these machines retain better manoeuvring capabilities.

== Modern racing ==
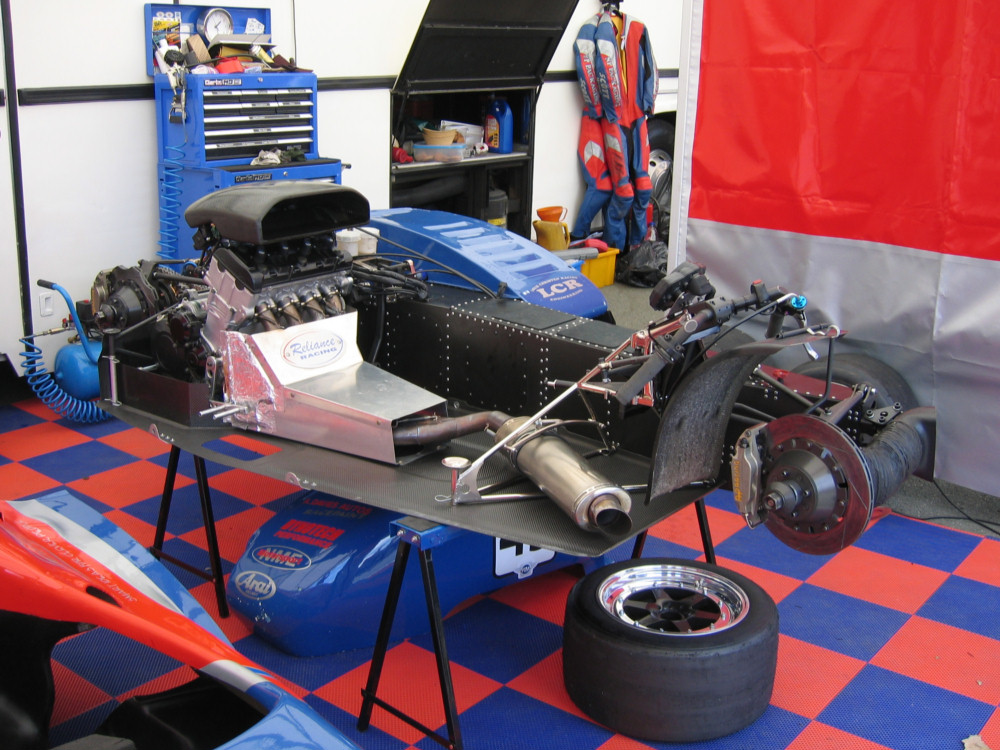
LCR Sidecar in race paddock

Between 1981 and 2016 Superside machines were known as Formula One sidecars using a basic unchanged design. These modern high tech machines are only related to motorcycles by the classification of the engines they use. All chassis are purpose built and owe more to open wheel race car technology and the tires are wide and have a flat profile. They are sometimes known as "worms".

The most successful sidecar racer in Superside has been Steve Webster, who has won four world championships and six world cup between 1987 and 2004. The most successful chassis is LCR, the Swiss sidecar maker, whose founder Louis Christen has won 35 championships between 1979 and 2016, with a variety of engines, originally Yamaha and Krauser two-strokes, more lately Suzuki four-strokes. The BMW Rennsport RS54 Engine powered to 19 straight constructors titles from 1955 to 1973, the most by any engines.

In 2014, for the first time a Kawasaki-powered machine won the title with Tim Reeves and Gregory Cluze ending an 11-year consecutive Suzuki run. In 2016 Kirsi Kainulainen became the first woman motorcycle world champion, as passenger to Pekka Päivärinta.

However, in 2017 the engine capacity of F1 sidecars was reduced from 1000cc to 600cc. This was a conscious effort by FIM to attract more participation from racers who still preferred the traditional F2 chassis. By reducing the engine size, it was hoped that this would mean competition on more equal terms. Nevertheless, the 2017 championship was still dominated by competitors using the F1 chassis. The highest placed F2 chassis team was 12th by Eckart Rösinger and Steffen Werner on their Baker-Suzuki GSX-R600.

=== Formats ===
Since 2005 there are now three types of race classes. Any given championship round can have all three type of races but sometimes there is only one type of race (the Gold Race) in one round, usually when the round is a supporting event of a major meeting such as MotoGP.

- Match Race. Teams are divided into groups and race in very short heat races. Winners and the better placing teams in these heats would advance to the next round (semi-finals), until only the best six teams left for the final heat race. A typical heat race distance is three laps.
- Sprint Race. All teams participate in a short race. A typical race distance is twelve laps.
- Gold Race. All teams participate in a long race, usually twice the distance of the sprint race.

== FIM Sidecar World Champions ==
=== Grand Prix ===
Season	Driver	Passenger	Bike	Constructor
600cc
1949	(United Kingdom) Eric Oliver	(United Kingdom) Denis Jenkinson	Norton Manx	Norton
1950	(United Kingdom) Eric Oliver	(Italy) Lorenzo Dobelli	Norton Manx	Norton
500cc
1951	(United Kingdom) Eric Oliver	(Italy) Lorenzo Dobelli	Norton Manx	Norton
1952	(United Kingdom) Cyril Smith	(United Kingdom) Bob Clements (United Kingdom) Les Nutt	Norton Manx	Norton
1953	(United Kingdom) Eric Oliver	(United Kingdom) Stanley Dibben	Norton Manx	Norton
1954	(West Germany) Wilhelm Noll	(West Germany) Fritz Cron	BMW RS54	Norton
1955	(West Germany) Willi Faust	(West Germany) Karl Remmert	BMW RS54	BMW
1956	(West Germany) Wilhelm Noll	(West Germany) Fritz Cron	BMW RS54	BMW
1957	(West Germany) Fritz Hillebrand	(West Germany) Manfred Grunwal	BMW RS54	BMW
1958	(West Germany) Walter Schneider	(West Germany) Hans Strauß	BMW RS54	BMW
1959	(West Germany) Walter Schneider	(West Germany) Hans Strauß	BMW RS54	BMW
1960	(West Germany) Helmut Fath	(West Germany) Alfred Wohlgemuth	BMW RS54	BMW
1961	(West Germany) Max Deubel	(West Germany) Emil Hörner	BMW RS54	BMW
1962	(West Germany) Max Deubel	(West Germany) Emil Hörner	BMW RS54	BMW
1963	(West Germany) Max Deubel	(West Germany) Emil Hörner (Note: Barry Dungworth was a substitute for the injured Emil Hörner in the Isle of Man round. The team finished eighth and received no points.)	BMW RS54	BMW
1964	(West Germany) Max Deubel	(West Germany) Emil Hörner	BMW RS54	BMW
1965	(Switzerland) Fritz Scheidegger	(United Kingdom) John Robinson	BMW RS54	BMW
1966	(Switzerland) Fritz Scheidegger	(United Kingdom) John Robinson	BMW RS54	BMW
1967	(West Germany) Klaus Enders	(West Germany) Ralf Engelhardt	BMW RS54	BMW
1968	(West Germany) Helmut Fath	(West Germany) Wolfgang Kalauch	URS	BMW
1969	(West Germany) Klaus Enders	(West Germany) Ralf Engelhardt	BMW RS54	BMW
1970	(West Germany) Klaus Enders	(West Germany) Ralf Engelhardt (West Germany) Wolfgang Kalauch	BMW RS54	BMW
1971	(West Germany) Horst Owesle	(West Germany) Julius Kremer (United Kingdom) Peter Rutterford	Münch-URS	BMW
1972	(West Germany) Klaus Enders	(West Germany) Ralf Engelhardt	BMW RS54	BMW
1973	(West Germany) Klaus Enders	(West Germany) Ralf Engelhardt	BMW RS54	BMW
1974	(West Germany) Klaus Enders	(West Germany) Ralf Engelhardt	Busch-BMW RS54	König
1975	(West Germany) Rolf Steinhausen	(West Germany) Josef Huber	Busch-König	König
1976	(West Germany) Rolf Steinhausen	(West Germany) Josef Huber	Busch-König	König
1977	(United Kingdom) George O'Dell	(United Kingdom) Kenny Arthur (United Kingdom) Cliff Holland	Windle-Yamaha TZ500; Seymaz-Yamaha TZ500	Yamaha
1978	(Switzerland) Rolf Biland	(United Kingdom) Kenneth Williams	TTM-Yamaha TZ500; BEO-Yamaha TZ500	Yamaha
1979 (B2A)	(Switzerland) Rolf Biland	(Switzerland) Kurt Waltisperg	Schmid-Yamaha TZ500	Yamaha
1979 (B2B)	(Switzerland) Bruno Holzer	(Switzerland) Charlie Maierhans	LCR-Yamaha TZ500	Yamaha
1980	(United Kingdom) Jock Taylor	(Sweden) Benga Johansson	Windle-Yamaha TZ500	Yamaha
1981	(Switzerland) Rolf Biland	(Switzerland) Kurt Waltisperg	LCR-Yamaha TZ500	Yamaha
1982	(West Germany) Werner Schwärzel	(West Germany) Andreas Huber	Seymaz-Yamaha TZ500	Yamaha
1983	(Switzerland) Rolf Biland	(Switzerland) Kurt Waltisperg	LCR-Yamaha TZ500	Yamaha
1984	(Netherlands) Egbert Streuer	(Netherlands) Bernard Schnieders	LCR-Yamaha TZ500	Yamaha
1985	(Netherlands) Egbert Streuer	(Netherlands) Bernard Schnieders	LCR-Yamaha TZ500	Yamaha
1986	(Netherlands) Egbert Streuer	(Netherlands) Bernard Schnieders	LCR-Yamaha TZ500	Yamaha
1987	(United Kingdom) Steve Webster	(United Kingdom) Tony Hewitt	LCR-Yamaha TZ500	Yamaha
1988	(United Kingdom) Steve Webster	(United Kingdom) Tony Hewitt (United Kingdom) Gavin Simmons	LCR-Yamaha TZ500	Yamaha
1989	(United Kingdom) Steve Webster	(United Kingdom) Tony Hewitt	LCR-Krauser	Krauser
1990	(France) Alain Michel	(United Kingdom) Simon Birchall	LCR-Krauser	Krauser
1991	(United Kingdom) Steve Webster	(United Kingdom) Gavin Simmons	LCR-Krauser	Krauser
1992	(Switzerland) Rolf Biland	(Switzerland) Kurt Waltisperg	LCR-Krauser	Krauser
1993	(Switzerland) Rolf Biland	(Switzerland) Kurt Waltisperg	LCR-Krauser	Krauser
1994	(Switzerland) Rolf Biland	(Switzerland) Kurt Waltisperg	LCR-Swissauto V4	ADM (Note: After the withdrawal of Michael Krauser GmBH from racing, former employee Auf Der Mauer took over and branded the engines as ADM.)
1995	(United Kingdom) Darren Dixon	(United Kingdom) Andy Hetherington	Windle-ADM	ADM
1996	(United Kingdom) Darren Dixon	(United Kingdom) Andy Hetherington	Windle-ADM	ADM
Sidecar World Cup
1997	(United Kingdom) Steve Webster	(United Kingdom) David James	LCR-ADM	
500cc 2-stroke or 1000cc 4-stroke
1998	(United Kingdom) Steve Webster	(United Kingdom) David James	LCR-Honda NSR500	
1999	(United Kingdom) Steve Webster	(United Kingdom) David James	LCR-Suzuki GSX-R 1000	
2000	(United Kingdom) Steve Webster	(United Kingdom) Paul Woodhead	LCR-Suzuki GSX-R 1000	
Superside
1000cc 4-stroke
2001	(Austria) Klaus Klaffenböck	(Austria) Christian Parzer	LCR-Suzuki GSX-R 1000	
2002	(United Kingdom) Steve Abbott	(United Kingdom) Jamie Biggs	Windle-Yamaha EXUP	
2003	(United Kingdom) Steve Webster	(United Kingdom) Paul Woodhead	LCR-Suzuki GSX-R 1000	
Superside World Cup
2004	(United Kingdom) Steve Webster	(United Kingdom) Paul Woodhead	LCR-Suzuki GSX-R 1000	
Superside
2005	(United Kingdom) Tim Reeves	(United Kingdom) Tristan Reeves	LCR-Suzuki GSX-R 1000	
2006	(United Kingdom) Tim Reeves	(United Kingdom) Tristan Reeves	LCR-Suzuki GSX-R 1000	
2007	(United Kingdom) Tim Reeves	(United Kingdom) Patrick Farrance (Note: Stuart Graham was injured during the practice session of the first round in Schleiz. Patrick Farrance substituted for the race and for the rest of the season.)	LCR-Suzuki GSX-R 1000	
2008	(Finland) Pekka Päivärinta	(Finland) Timo Karttiala	LCR-Suzuki GSX-R 1000	
2009	(United Kingdom) Ben Birchall	(United Kingdom) Tom Birchall	LCR-Suzuki GSX-R 1000	
Superside Sidecar World Championship
2010	(Finland) Pekka Päivärinta	(Switzerland) Adolf Hänni	LCR-Suzuki GSX-R1000	
2011	(Finland) Pekka Päivärinta	(Switzerland) Adolf Hänni	LCR-Suzuki GSX-R1000	
2012	(United Kingdom) Tim Reeves	(United Kingdom) Ashley Hawes	LCR-Suzuki GSX-R1000	
2013	(Finland) Pekka Päivärinta	(Switzerland) Adolf Hänni	LCR-Suzuki GSX-R1000	
2014	(United Kingdom) Tim Reeves	(France) Gregory Cluze	LCR-Kawasaki ZX-10R	
2014 (F2 World Trophy)	(United Kingdom) Tim Reeves	(France) Gregory Cluze	DMR-Honda CBR600	
2015	(Netherlands) Bennie Streuer	(Netherlands) Geert Koerts	LCR Suzuki GSX-R1000	
2015 (F2 World Trophy)	(United Kingdom) Tim Reeves	(United Kingdom) Patrick Farrance	DMR-Honda CBR600	
2016	(Finland) Pekka Päivärinta	(Finland) Kirsi Kainulainen (Note: First woman to become a FIM world champion in any discipline without gender segregation. Actually the first woman to win the FIM championship title in women-only discipline was Laia Sanz in 2005, when she won the FIM Women's World Trial Championship after it changed its name from Cup to Championship.)	LCR-BMW S 1000RR	
2016 (F2 World Trophy)	(United Kingdom) Ben Birchall	(United Kingdom) Tom Birchall	LCR-Honda CBR600	
600 cc 4-stroke
2017	(United Kingdom) Ben Birchall	(United Kingdom) Tom Birchall	LCR-Yamaha YZF-R6	
2018	(United Kingdom) Ben Birchall	(United Kingdom) Tom Birchall	LCR-Yamaha YZF-R6	
2019	(United Kingdom) Tim Reeves	(United Kingdom) Mark Wilkes	Adolf RS-Yamaha YZF-R6	
2020	Season cancelled due to the COVID-19 pandemic			
2021	(Switzerland) Markus Schlosser	(Switzerland) Marcel Fries	LCR-Yamaha YZF-R6	
2022	(United Kingdom) Todd Ellis	(France) Emmanuelle Clément	LCR-Yamaha YZF-R6	
2023	(United Kingdom) Todd Ellis	(France) Emmanuelle Clément	LCR-Yamaha YZF-R6	
2024	(United Kingdom) Harry Payne	(France) Kevin Rousseau	Adolf RS-Yamaha YZF-R6	
2025	(United Kingdom) Sam Christie	(United Kingdom) Tom Christie	LCR-Yamaha YZF-R6	
2026	(United Kingdom) Harry Payne	(France) Kevin Rousseau	Adolf RS-Yamaha YZF-R6	
