= Kirsi Kainulainen =

Finnish motorcycle racer

Kirsi Kainulainen (born 23 November 1985 in Iisalmi) is a Finnish motorcycle racer.

== Sidecar class ==
In 2015, Kainulainen made history by winning the World Championship bronze as the first woman in track motorcycling in the sidecar class with Pekka Päivärinta.

In the 2016 season, Kainulainen also made history by being the first woman to win a FIM World Championship in motorcycling with men in the same series, winning the 2016 FIM Sidecar World Championship with Pekka Päivärinna on a LCR BMW

== Solo classes ==
In the solo classes, Kainulainen has ridden on the track at the Finnish Championship, PM and European Championships in classes 125cc and 600cc. She has also been successful on the ice racing at the national level both in solo in different classes and in the sidecar class with Päivärinta.

In 2018, Kainulainen signed a contract with the Dutch racing team and drove the Ow-cup series in Europe.

In the 2019 season, Kainulainen returned to the colours of her own Motorsline Kainulainen team and drove the international Alpe Adrian series in Europe.

== Competitive success ==
- 2006: SM Bronze Roadracing 125cc
- 2007: PM Bronze Roadracing 125cc
- 2014: Ice rink sidecar SM championship silver.
- 2015: Third place in the FIM Sidecar World Championship
- 2016: Ice track sidecar class SM-silver.
- 2016: First place in the FIM Sidecar World Championship
- 2018: Return to the track motorcycle solo career (OW-cup)
- 2019: International Alpe Adriatic Series for Track Motorcycling. 600cc STK class 7th place in the end points.
- 2020: The first woman on the ice track to have been on the podium (3rd place) in the B 450cc class.

Sporting positions
Preceded by Bennie Streuer; With: Geert Koerts	World Sidecar Champion; 2016; With: Pekka Päivärinta	Succeeded by Ben Birchall; With: Tom Birchall
