= Pekka Päivärinta (motorcyclist) =

Finnish motorcycle racer

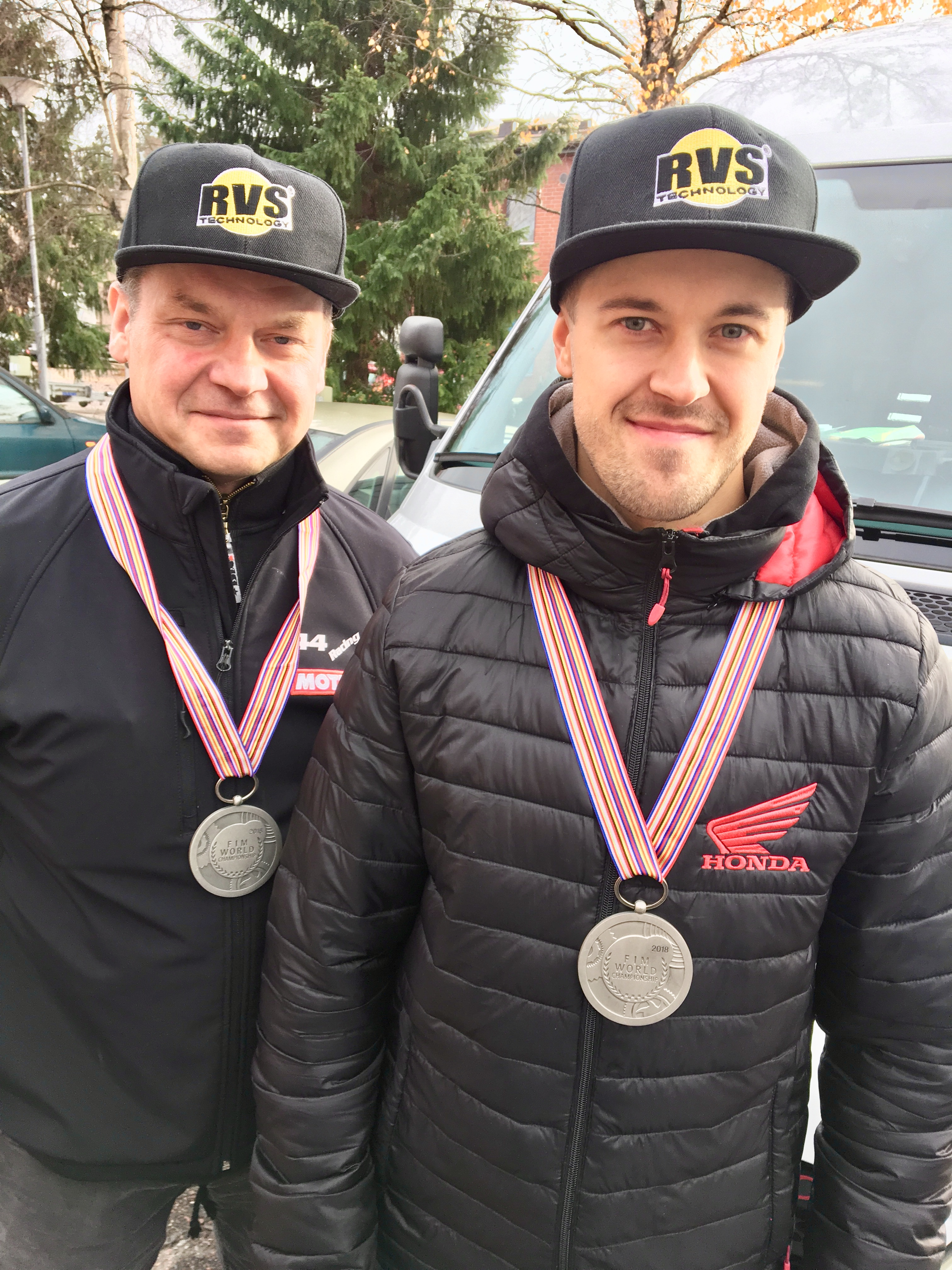
Pekka Päivärinta and Jussi Veräväinen celebrating their first season of cooperation, after which they became silver medalists. 20 October 2018.

Pekka Päivärinta (born 1971) is a Finnish sidecar motorcycle racer, who with passenger Timo Karttiala, was the 2008 Superside FIM World Sidecar Champion. Päivärinta rode a Suzuki GSXR1000 powered LCR as part of Team Suzuki Finland and is the first Finn to win a world sidecar title. Päivärinta also won the 2010, 2011 and 2013 FIM Sidecar World Championship, with Swiss passenger Adolf Hänni and 2016 with Kirsi Kainulainen on a LCR BMW.

Päivärinta is competing in the 2021 FIM Sidecar World Championship with Dutch passenger Ilse De Haas.

Sporting positions
Preceded by Tim Reeves; With: Patrick Farrance	World Sidecar Champion; 2008; With: Timo Karttiala	Succeeded by Ben Birchall; With: Tom Birchall
Preceded by Ben Birchall; With: Tom Birchall	World Sidecar Champion; 2010-2011; With: Adolf Hänni	Succeeded by Tim Reeves; With: Ashley Hawes
Preceded by Tim Reeves; With: Ashley Hawes	World Sidecar Champion; 2013; With: Adolf Hänni	Succeeded by Tim Reeves; With: Gregory Cluze
Preceded by Bennie Streuer; With: Geert Koerts	World Sidecar Champion; 2016; With: Kirsi Kainulainen	Succeeded by Ben Birchall; With: Tom Birchall
