= Michael Buxton =

Australian urban planner

- Title: Emeritus Professor

Academic background
- Education: B.A., Dip. Ed., BEd, PhD.
- Alma mater: Monash University

Academic work
- Discipline: Urban planning
- Institutions: RMIT University, Environment Protection Authority (Victoria), Monash University

Michael Buxton is a former Australian urban planning academic, author and media commentator.

== Career ==
Michael Buxton worked for 12 years in various planning and environment authorities and departments in the State Government of Victoria, including the Victorian Environmental Protection Authority.

He joined RMIT University in 1998 and retired in 2018. His academic career focused on studying peri-urban areas of Australian cities, particularly in Victoria.

During this time he was and remains a frequent critic of planning policy and urban development, particularly in Melbourne in the mass media. He criticises the lack of diversity of housing styles and types and lack of long-term planning for the future of cities, community consultation, and lack of large-scale transport infrastructure. Buxton frequently condemns the Victorian Labor Party and its record on urban planning in the state, such as centralising control of regulations and standards and embarking on large-scale infrastructure projects such as the Suburban Rail Loop. This included writing an open letter to voters in the state electorate of Richmond during the 2018 Victorian state election encouraging recipients to vote against then-Minister for Planning, Richard Wynne.

He is a strong supporter of third-party appeal rights and other processes that allow existing residents to object to proposed developments and planning changes and expressed opposition to increasing densities in various parts of Melbourne.

== Bibliography ==
- Buxton, Michael; Goodman, Robin; Moloney, Susie (2016). Planning Melbourne: lessons for a sustainable city. Clayton South: CSIRO Publishing. ISBN 9780643104723.
- Buxton, Michael; Butt, Andrew (2020). The future of the fringe: the crisis in peri-urban planning. Clayton South, VIC: CSIRO Publishing. ISBN 9781486308958.
- Buxton, Michael (5 July 2023). 1964. Hardie Grant Media. ISBN 9781743799871.
