= Giorgio Gatti =

Italian singer (1948–2021)

Giorgio Gatti (1 November 1948 – 1 April 2021) was an Italian baritone.

== Biography ==
Gatti studied singing in Florence with the tenor Vincenzo Guerrieri and later, at the Santa Cecilia Conservatory in Rome, with Maria Teresa Pediconi. He studied with maestro Renato Federighi in Rome, with soprano Maria Luisa Zeri and maestro Luciano Bettarini in Prato.

In 1971 he won the "Adriano Belli" experimental opera competition in Spoleto, and debuted at the Teatro Nuovo in the roles of Taddeo in Gioacchino Rossini's Italian in Algeri, Silvio in Pagliacci by Ruggero Leoncavallo and 'Sigismondo' in Gaetano Donizetti's Fat Thursday .

In 1972 he won the international television review «New Rossini Voices» organized by the Italian Radio Television. He has participated in some absolute "premieres": Jaufré Rudel and Trilby by Adolfo Gandino; The bear by Silvano Sardi; Four Odes of Horace by Bruno Nicolai; Question and answers by Virgilio Mortari; Perch'io by Roberto Gianotti; A night of joy by Arturo Annecchino; Glory by Franco Ferroni.

He was part of the "Piccolo Teatro Musicale della città di Roma" complex with "I Virtuosi di Roma" directed by Maestro Renato Fasano (1970–1977) and "Gruppo Recitar Cantando" (1980–1990) directed by Maestro Fausto Razzi, specialized in interpretation of sixteenth and seventeenth century music. Since 1972 he has performed chamber music concerts in duo with his wife Maria Teresa Conti, pianist and harpsichordist.

He took part in three television productions broadcast worldwide: – Tosca in the places and hours of Tosca (1992) a live Rai 1 film broadcast in 107 countries on 5 continents. 3 Emmy Awards, Classical Music Awards "Event of the Year". "Best World TV Program" of the Bafta. The show, directed by Giuseppe Patroni Griffi, also features Catherine Malfitano (Tosca), Ruggero Raimondi (Scarpia), Giacomo Prestia (Angelotti), Plácido Domingo (Cavaradossi) and the RAI Symphony Orchestra of Rome was conducted by Zubin Mehta; – La Traviata in Paris (2000) a live film broadcast in 125 countries on 5 continents. 4 Emmy Awards for "Best Music Program of the Year in USA". Prix italia as "Best Program in the World for Performing Arts". "Special Jury Prize" at the Nombre d'Or in Amsterdam.

In recent years, in addition to expanding his repertoire in the field of Italian comic opera of the '700, he ventured into the "musical" Caruso the Story of a Myth by Gianluca Terranova, 2002 and the musical comedy Victor Victoria by Blake Edwards', 2003 On 10 August 1997 he was awarded the title of honorary citizen of the Abruzzo town of Sante Marie.

He died on 1 April 2021, of COVID-19 after being hospitalized for days in a hospital in Rome.
