= Rolf Steinhausen =

German motorcycle racer

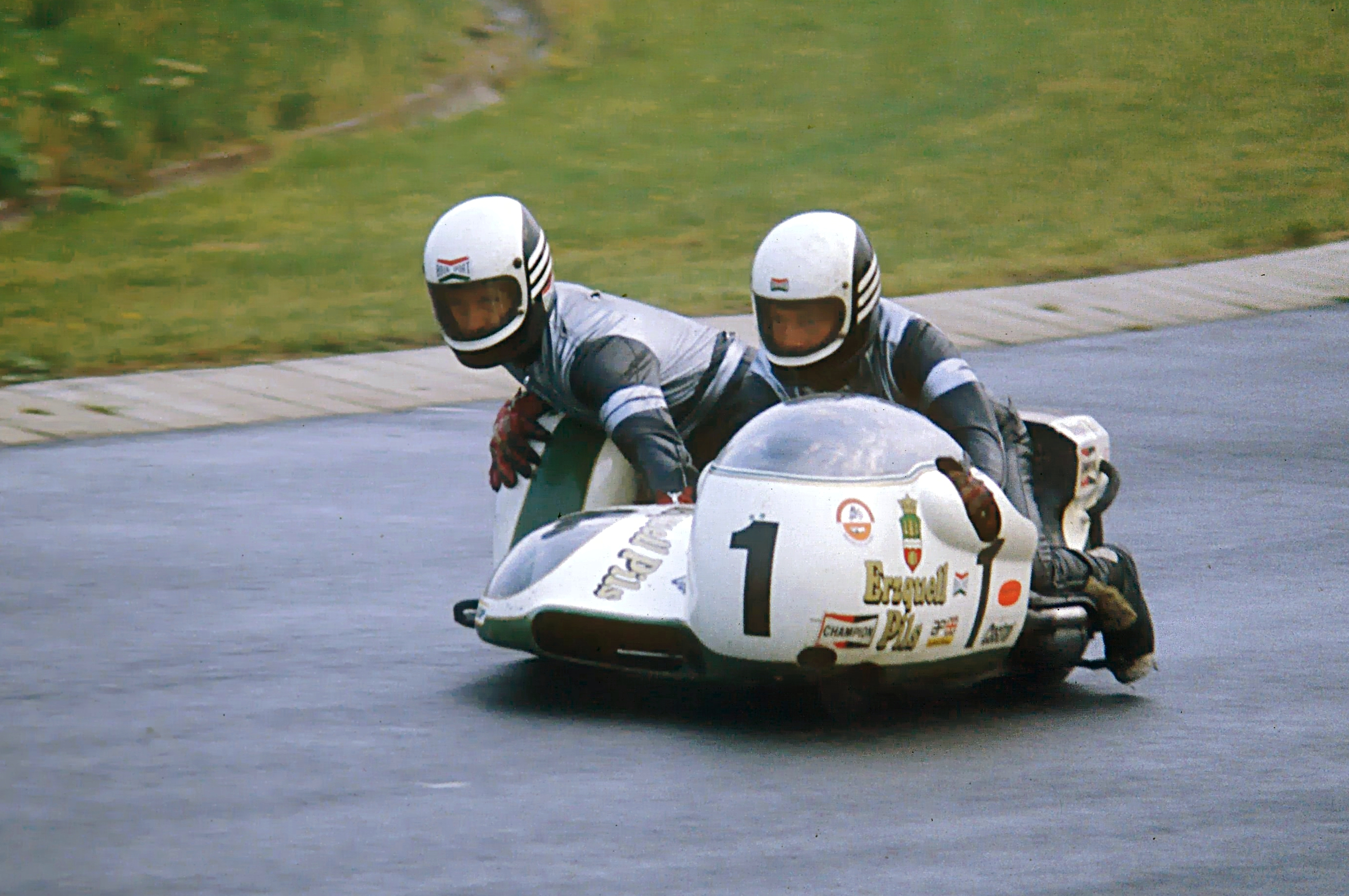
- Rolf Steinhausen and Sepp Huber at Nürburgring in 1976
- Nationality: German
- Born: 27 July 1943 (age 83); Nümbrecht, Nazi Germany
Motorcycle racing career statistics
Grand Prix motorcycle racing
| Active years | 1972 - 1989 |
| First race | 1972 French Grand Prix |
| Last race | 1989 Czechoslova Grand Prix |
| First win | 1974 Belgian Grand Prix |
| Last win | 1979 Belgian Grand Prix |
| Championships | Sidecars - 1975, 1976 |
Starts / Wins / Podiums / Poles / F. laps / Points; 64 / 10 / 22
Isle of Man TT career
| TTs contested | 18 (1973-1981) |
| TT wins | 3 |
| TT podiums | 1 |

Rolf Steinhausen (born 27 July 1943) is a German former motorcycle racer, winner of two Sidecar World Championships.

== Career ==
Steinhausen made his debut in motorcycle racing in 1961. After a few incidents, in 1964 moved on to the sidecar class, driven also by his friendship with the four-time World Sidecar Champion Max Deubel. Deubel recognized Steinhausen's talent and gave him one of his sidecars.

Having started with the sidecar powered by BMW in 1972, Steinhausen decided to use the engines of König, four-cylinder two-stroke of powerboat origin. The new engines allowed the German to build a sidecar lower and with better aerodynamics. In that year, the German also made his debut in the Grand Prix motorcycle racing World Championship, where he came tenth in partnership with Werner Kapp, achieving a best result of fourth place at the Austrian GP.

The following season, Steinhausen was sixth in the World (alternating passengers, Karl Scheurer and Erich Schmitz), getting his first podium finish (third in the Sidecar TT). For the 1974 season, the German made a new chassis with the specialist Dieter Busch. With the new sidecar, Steinhausen won his first GP (one of Belgium) and was fourth in the World (alternating two passengers this year too: Scheurer and Josef Huber).

The 1975 season saw Steinhausen (paired with Huber) graduate to Champion of the World, thanks to three wins (Austria, TT and Belgium). That '75 was also the first title for a two-stroke sidecar. In 1976, Steinhausen was reconfirmed champion (winning again the same three GP as the previous year) and the 500cc Sidecar TT.

The 1977 season saw Steinhausen favorite for the title, but he did not do it, for various engine problems. From the French GP, Steinhausen changed to a new engine from Yamaha and a new passenger (Wolfgang Kalauch), which ended the season in fourth place with a win in Czechoslovakia. Remembered for the Belgian Grand Prix, where the German marked the lap record at 200.520 km/h.

Despite winning his third Sidecar TT, Steinhausen had an anonymous 1978, finishing in 14th place in the world championship, the 1979 season saw Steinhausen fighting for the title of the category B2A, finishing in second place behind the Swiss Rolf Biland. That '79 title was one of the last competitive seasons for Steinhausen, whose career ended in late 1989, having won two German sidecar titles (1986 and 1987).

== Retirement ==
After retiring Steinhausen has become an entrepreneur, running a trucking firm. He is father of current sidecar racer Jörg Steinhausen.

Sporting positions
| Preceded by Klaus Enders; With: Ralf Engelhardt | World Sidecar Champion; 1975, 1976; With: Josef Huber | Succeeded by George O'Dell; With: Kenny Arthur and Cliff Holland |
