= Kenny Andrews =

British motorcycle racer

Kenneth Norman "Kenny" Andrews (born 10 January 1947) is a British motorcycle sidecar racing champion.

Andrews was born in Smethwick, Birmingham, and began his sidecar racing career in 1971 as a passenger to John Bottomly, riding a Triumph-engined Norton outfit. In 1979 Andrews won the Scottish Sidecar Championship, and in 1979, and 1980 he raced and finished the Isle of Man TT.

Andrews retired from racing in 1980 to further his career as a Sales/Service Engineer for Arrow Construction, in order to provide for his family. In 1989, he returned to sidecar racing for one season, driving a TZ750 Windle Framed outfit, and taking the North East Club Trophy at Langborough. In 2008, he returned to motorsport once again.

In 2009 and 2010, Kenny raced in the Scottish Championship with Son, Kenny Andrews Jr. The pair won the Melville Motor Club F1 Sidecar championship in 2010. Due to a non racing related injury, Kenny Jr now races his own F2 Sidecar.
