= Jock Taylor =

British sidecar racer

- Taylor aboard his Fowler Yamaha outfit in 1979 at a guest-appearance when opening a motorcycle shop at Derby, prior to Stars at Darley, a nearby race meeting held annually where a selection of higher-level motorcycle racers compete in a local club event
- Nationality: British
- Born: John Robert Taylor; 9 March 1954; Pencaitland, East Lothian, Scotland
- Died: 15 August 1982 (aged 28); Imatra Circuit, Finland
Motorcycle racing career statistics
Grand Prix motorcycle racing
Active years	1978–1982
Team	1 Fowlers of Bristol
Championships	1 (1980)

John Robert "Jock" Taylor (9 March 1954 – 15 August 1982) was a Scottish World Champion motorcycle sidecar racer.

Taylor was born in Pencaitland, East Lothian, and entered his first sidecar race at the age of 19, as the passenger to Kenny Andrews (1974). The following year, he took part in his first race as a driver. Taylor died in Finland in a racing incident in 1982.

== Racing career ==
Taylor was the Scottish Sidecar Champion with passenger Lewis Ward in 1977. He won races at East Fortune near Haddington, Beveridge Park in Kirkcaldy and at Knockhill near Dunfermline as well as events in England with some success. In 1978, he decided to tackle the odd Grand Prix race and the British Championships and parted company with Ward and teamed up with a new passenger from nearby Haddington called Jimmy Neil. It took some time for the new partnership to gel, but by the end of the season they were regularly winning races in England. In 1979, Taylor acquired a Seymaz hub steering type outfit. He found it not to his liking after two accidents that left Jimmy Neil with a fractured wrist and caused the death of stand-in passenger Dave Powell at Oulton Park in a high-speed crash. With Neil still injured, Taylor used veteran passenger Jimmy Law for the German GP at Hockenheim on his old Windle framed Yamaha, where they finished fifth. Although Neil returned to Assen in Holland, it was when he teamed up with Swedish former125 cc rider Benga Johansson that Taylor took his first Grand Prix victory at the Swedish TT at Karlskoga shortly after. There were further successes towards the end of 1979 in Britain, where he finished runner-up in the British Championship behind Dick Greasley. In 1980, Taylor and Benga Johansson won four Grand Prix races, and finished on the podium in all seven events they finished. He won the British Championship and won the Isle of Man Sidecar B race to win the Sidecar TT overall. In 1981, he retained his British title and went on to become a four-time TT race winner. In 1982, Taylor and Johansson raised the sidecar lap record at the Isle of Man TT to 108.29 mph (174.27 km/h), a lap record which stood for seven years.

== Death ==
In the 1982 Finnish Grand Prix, held in Imatra under very wet conditions, Taylor and Johansson's bike began to aquaplane and slid off the road, colliding with a telephone pole. Emergency services attempted to remove him from the wreckage until a second sidecar team slid off into them. Taylor died in hospital later that evening. He was buried in the local cemetery at Pencaitland, and a memorial to him was erected in the village in December 2006. A memorial also stands in Beveridge Park, Kirkcaldy, overlooking Railway Bend on the old motorcycle racing circuit. Taylor also has a memorial in Imatra, near the paddock of Finnish championship racetrack.

== Restoration ==
Taylor's World championship, and TT 108.29 mph (174.27 km/h) lap record-winning sidecar was bought by friend and fellow competitor Jack Muldoon from Taylor's sponsor Dennis Trollope. Muldoon rescued Taylor's outfit from the 5-man consortium who were supposed to restore the bike to its original condition and display it in a museum in Alford, Aberdeenshire. That never happened in the four years that it lay up in Alford in bits in a shed.

Jack Muldoon and family bought Taylor's bike in March 2012 and started the restoration work immediately. The sidecar was completely stripped to a bare chassis, with months spent with emery cleaning and polishing the chassis. Due to the 26 years it lay at Donington in the museum and then four years up in Aberdeen, the chassis and all components were covered in rust and everything was seized: every component on the bike had to be stripped and cleaned, all bearings in all parts of the chassis were replaced, and the engine was completely rebuilt. It was done with the help of Bill Howarth and Dennis Trollope for all the Yamaha TZ700 parts required in the engine rebuild; Terry Windle, Stuart Mellor, Lockheed, HEL Performance Brake Pipes, Paul Drake Koni Shockers, Yolst Silkoline Oils. By August the restoration was 90% complete – it was the first time in 30 years that the TZ700 engine had run, and it was paraded at the Jock Taylor Memorial race weekend at East Fortune near Edinburgh in August 2012, a few miles from where Taylor was born and brought up.

== Annual Jock Taylor Memorial Race ==
In the year following his death, an annual end of season race was established at Knockhill called the Jock Taylor Trophy. Every year, sidecar racers travel from all over the UK to race in what has become a prestigious race. In 2012, the race was held at East Fortune, where Taylor started his racing career nearly 40 years ago.

Sporting positions
Preceded by Rolf Biland (B2A); With: Kurt Waltisperg	World Sidecar Champion; 1980; With: Benga Johansson	Succeeded by Rolf Biland; With: Kurt Waltisperg
Preceded by Bruno Holzer (B2B); With: Karl Meierhans	World Sidecar Champion; 1980; With: Benga Johansson	Succeeded by Rolf Biland; With: Kurt Waltisperg
