= Windle (sidecar) =

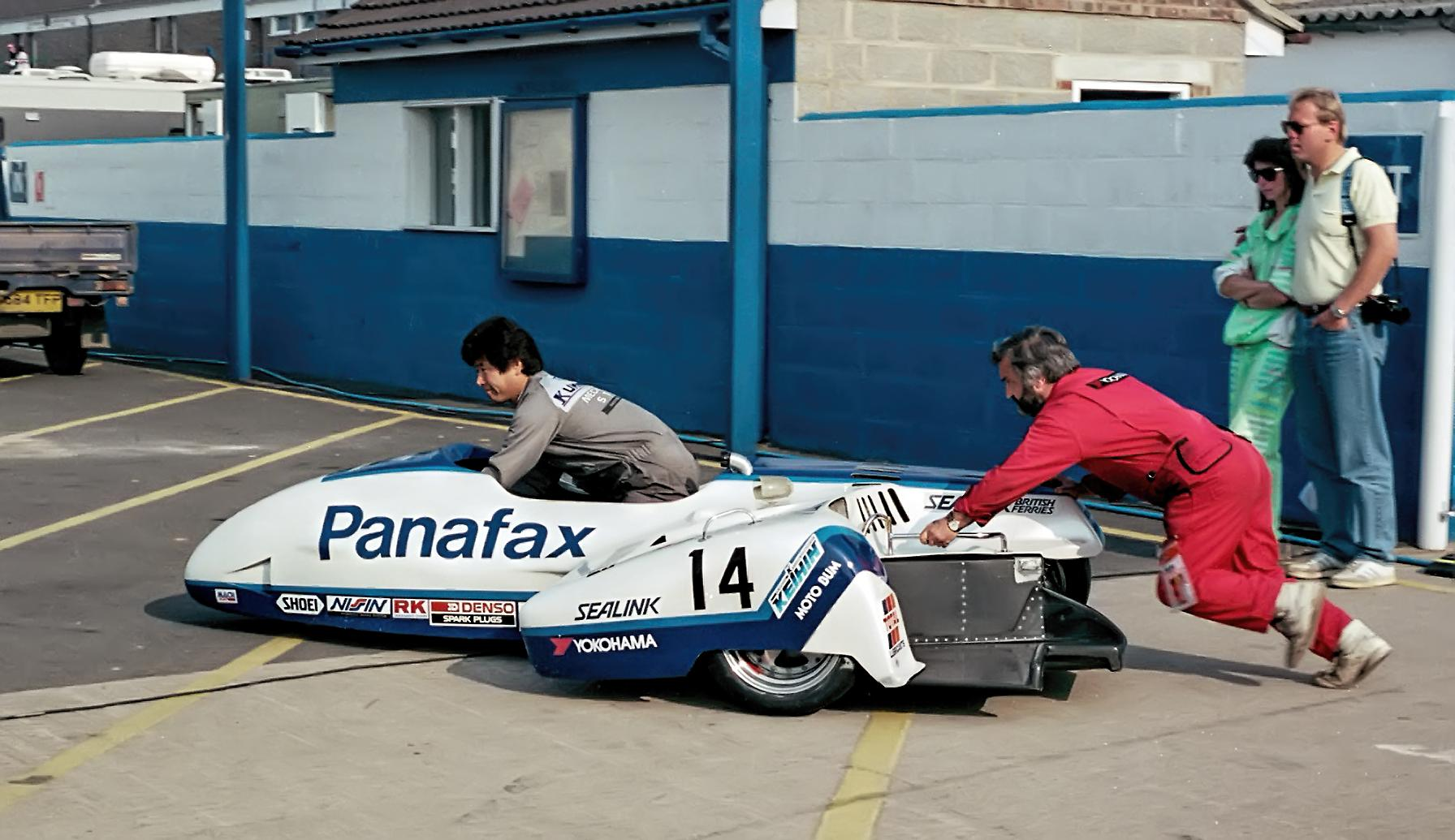
The Windle KS Sidecar, ridden by Yoshi Kumagaya and Phil Coombes at the 1989 British Grand Prix.

Windle was an English sidecar manufacturer that built road racing sidecars. The company was founded by Terry Windle and provided both monocoque Formula 1 as well as tubular Formula 2 chassis for use from club level racing up to and including World Championship level. With five world championship wins between 1977 with George O'Dell and 2002 with Steve Abbott, Terry decided to retire in 2009. The name was revived by D&D Sidecars but they only manufacture tubular Formula 2 sidecars.

== Championships ==
Windle sidecars have won the following Sidecar World Championships:

- 1977 George O'Dell/ Kenny Arthur/ Cliff Holland - Windle/Yamaha TZ 500
- 1980 Jock Taylor/ Benga Johansson - Windle/Yamaha TZ 500
- 1995 Darren Dixon/ Andy Hetherington - Windle ADM 500
- 1996 Darren Dixon/ Andy Hetherington - Windle ADM 500
- 2002 Steve Abbott/ Jamie Biggs - Windle/Yamaha FZR1000 EXUP
