= Rolf Biland =

Swiss former sidecar racer

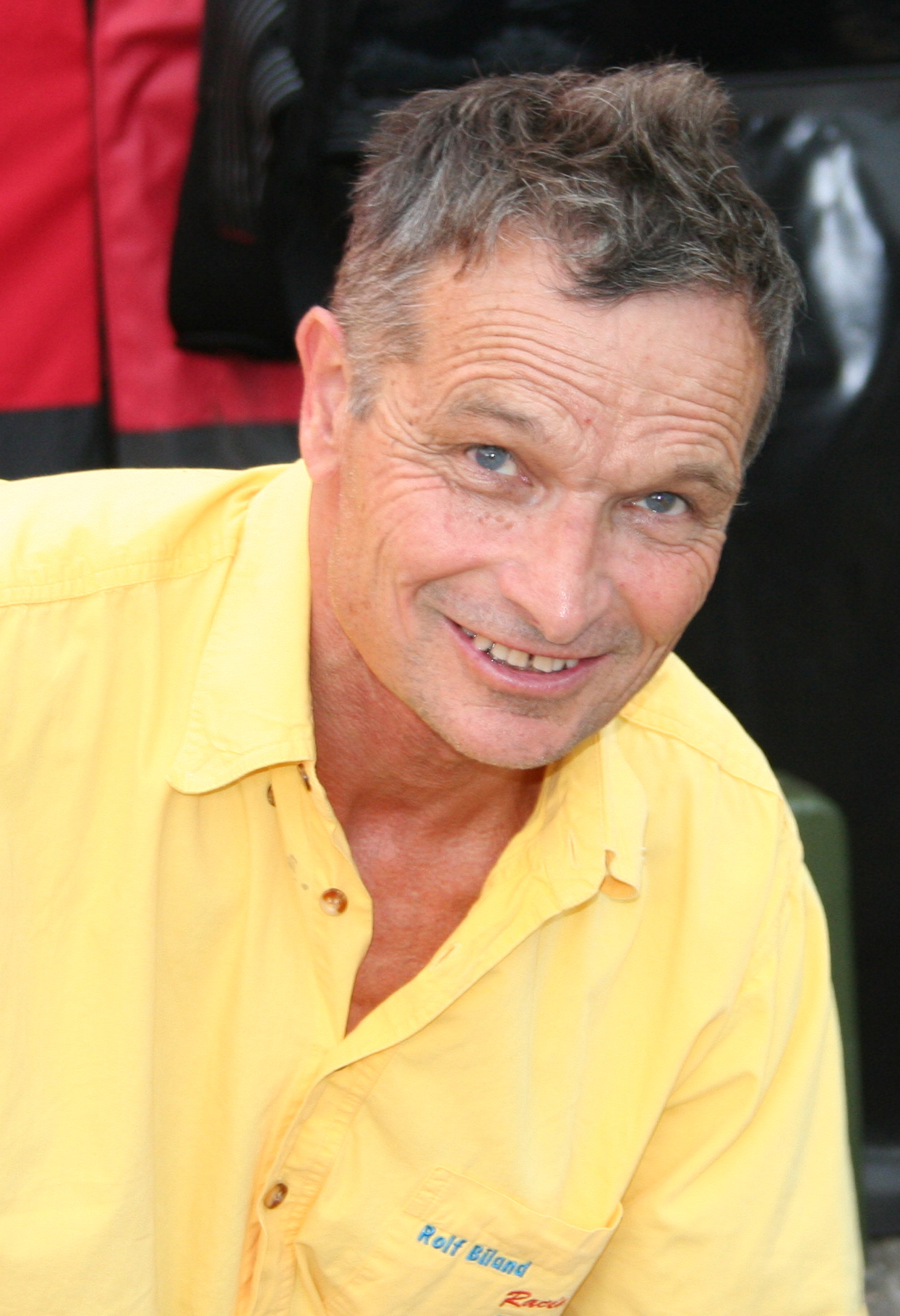
- Biland in 2014
- Nationality: Swiss
- Born: 1 April 1951 (age 75)
Motorcycle racing career statistics
Grand Prix motorcycle racing
Active years	1974 - 1996
First race	1974 French Grand Prix
Last race	1997 Austrian Grand Prix
First win	1975 German Grand Prix
Last win	1996 Catalan Grand Prix
Championships	Sidecars - 1978, 1979 (B2B), 1981, 1983, 1992, 1993, 1994
Starts / Wins / Podiums / Poles / F. laps / Points; 171 / 80 / 114 / 98 / 73 / 2144.5
Isle of Man TT career
TTs contested	4 (1977-1980)
TT wins	0
TT podiums	1

Rolf Biland (born 1 April 1951) is a Swiss former sidecar racer. He is known not only for his seven FIM Sidecar World Championships and 80 Grand Prix wins, but for his experimentation and innovation with new types of machine, like the Seymaz, the BEO and the LCR. His success was not limited to Grand Prix tracks, as he finished second at the Isle of Man Sidecar TT at his first attempt. Biland was instrumental in the development of the Swissauto V4 engine and won his last world title using it.

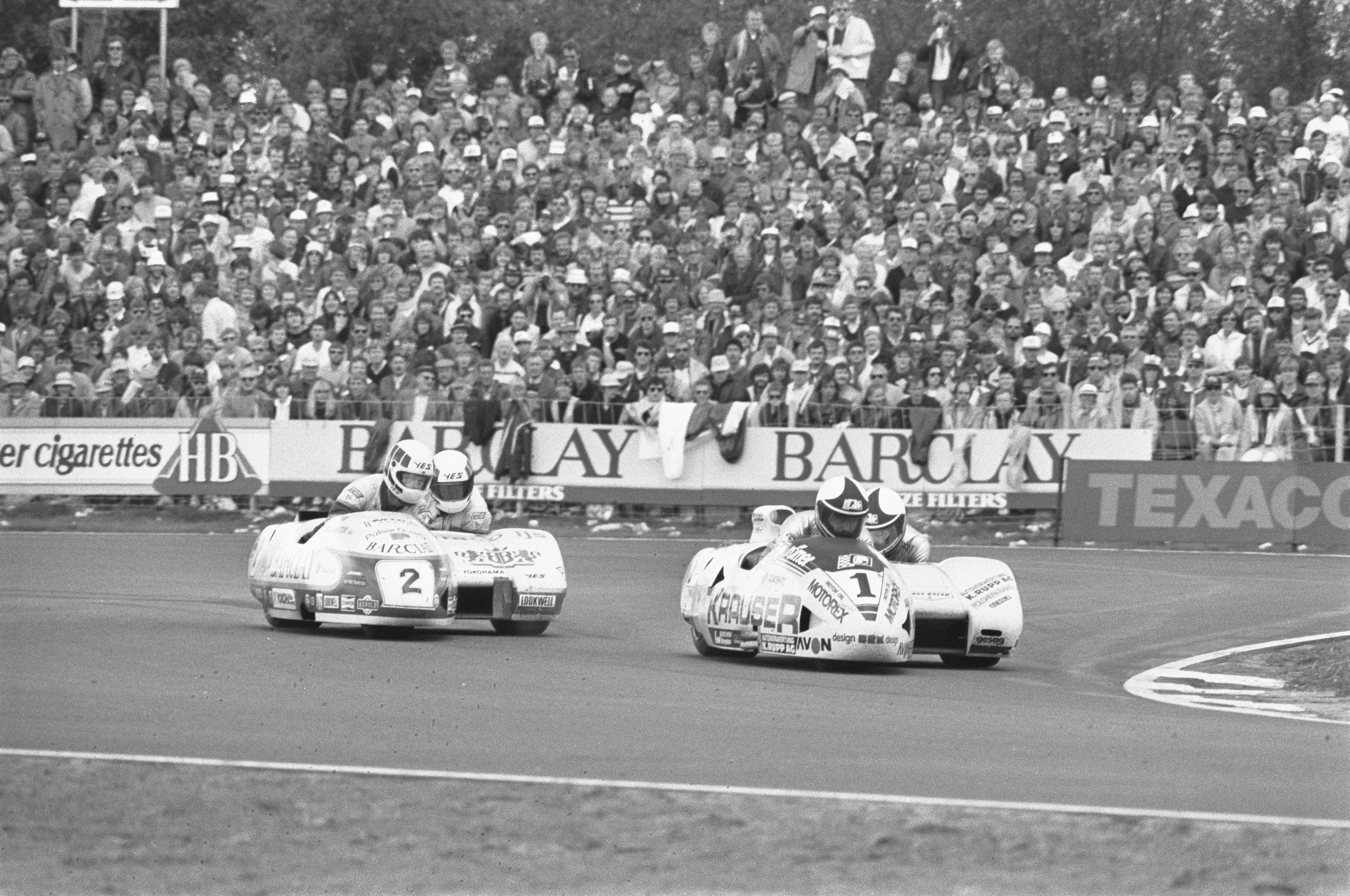
Biland and Kurt Waltisperg (1) lead Egbert Streuer and Bernard Schnieders (2) during the 1984 Sidecar Dutch TT.

Biland retired from sidecar competition and became team manager for the MuZ 500 team in 1999, renaming it Team Biland GP1. The team had some success but failed to secure a sponsor and folded at the end of that year.

Biland now runs Karting events in Switzerland.

Sporting positions
Preceded by George O'Dell; With: Kenny Arthur and Cliff Holland	World Sidecar Champion; 1978; With: Kenneth Williams	Succeeded by Rolf Biland (B2A); With: Kurt Waltisperg
Preceded by George O'Dell; With: Kenny Arthur and Cliff Holland	World Sidecar Champion; 1978; With: Kenneth Williams	Succeeded by Bruno Holzer (B2B); With: Karl Meierhans
Preceded by Rolf Biland; With: Kenneth Williams; Combined championship	B2A World Sidecar Champion; 1979; With: Kurt Waltisperg	Succeeded by Jock Taylor; With: Benga Johansson; Re-combined championship
Preceded by Jock Taylor; With: Benga Johansson	World Sidecar Champion; 1981; With: Kurt Waltisperg	Succeeded by Werner Schwärzel; With: Andreas Huber
Preceded by Werner Schwärzel; With: Andreas Huber	World Sidecar Champion; 1983; With: Kurt Waltisperg	Succeeded by Egbert Streuer; With: Bernard Schnieders
Preceded by Steve Webster; With: Gavin Simmons	World Sidecar Champion; 1992-1994; With: Kurt Waltisperg	Succeeded by Darren Dixon; With: Andy Hetherington
