= Steib =

Steib is a surname. Notable people with the surname include:

- J. Terry Steib (born 1940), Catholic prelate

== See also ==
- Dave Stieb (born 1957), American baseball pitcher
- Steib Metallbau, former German sidecar manufacturer
