= Watsonian Squire =

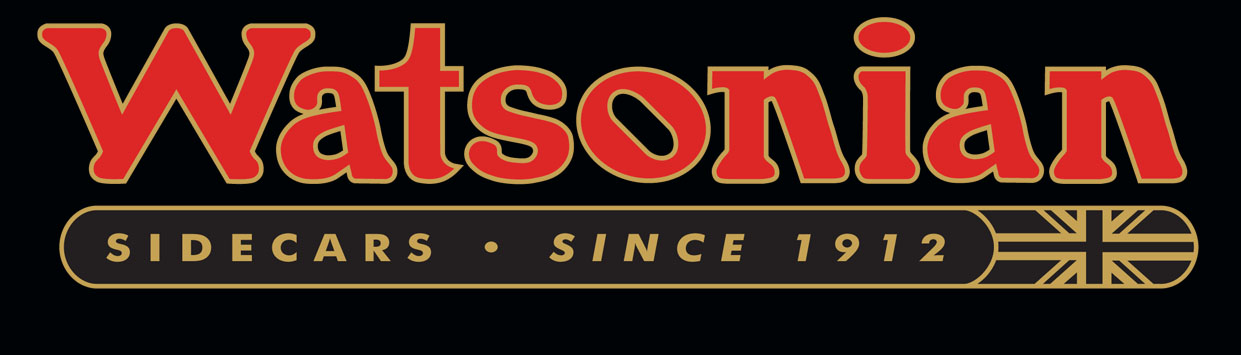
- Company type: Private
- Industry: Motorcycles
- Predecessor: Watsonian Sidecar Co Ltd; Squire Sidecars
- Founded: 1912
- Founder: Thomas Fredrick Watson
- Headquarters: Blockley, Moreton-in-Marsh, England
- Products: Sidecars
- Website: watsonian-squire.com

Watsonian Squire is a British manufacturer of sidecars for attachment to motorcycles. The original business was established in 1912 by Thomas Fredrick Watson as the Patent Collapsible Sidecar Company Ltd. at Balsall Heath, Birmingham, England.

The current company is based in the heart of the Cotswolds at Blockley, near Moreton-in-Marsh, Gloucestershire.

== History ==
'Fred' Watson founded the Patent Collapsible Sidecar Company, later renamed to Watsonian Folding Sidecar Company Ltd, after he built a folding sidecar that allowed him to get his motorcycle and sidecar combination through a narrow entrance to the yard at his house.

Early sidecars were initially built with wickerwork bodies, which were then replaced by ash frames with plywood or steel panels. During World War I the company built sidecars for use as motorcycle ambulances. In 1922, the company moved to Hockley in Birmingham.

Watsonian Side Car, Albion Road, Greet, Birmingham

In 1930, the company was renamed to the Watsonian Sidecar Company Ltd. In the same year the factory was destroyed by fire and in 1931 the company moved to new premises in Greet.

A significant setback occurred in 1930 when the Watsonian factory was destroyed by a fire ignited by a passing steam train. However, the company demonstrated resilience by relocating the following year to larger premises in the Greet district of Birmingham. This move facilitated the development of a new product range, which notably expanded to include sidecars for bicycles. By the end of the 1930s, Watsonian offered a diverse selection of 12 sidecar body styles and five motorcycle chassis, including the luxurious Oxford saloon and the lightweight, aluminium-bodied International trials model.

The onset of World War II led to a temporary cessation of sidecar production as Watsonian contributed to the war effort by manufacturing essential equipment such as camp beds and rucksack frames. Following the war, the company founder, Fred Watson, died, and his son Ron Watson, who had served in the Army in the Far East, took over leadership.

Ron Watson continued his father's emphasis on innovation and business acumen, while also recognizing the promotional value of motorcycle sport. His collaboration with Norton Motorcycles and the prominent sidecar pilot Eric Oliver resulted in the development of advanced sports sidecar designs. This partnership achieved considerable success in international competition, with Watsonian-Norton outfits winning every sidecar world championship from 1949 to 1953, a notable period for British motorcycle manufacturing.

The 1950s marked a peak in the popularity of sidecars, with Watsonian being a leading manufacturer. By 1952, approximately half of the over 130,000 sidecar combinations registered in Britain were Watsonian products, and the Birmingham factory reached a production rate of 200 units per week. The company also adopted new materials, including fibreglass for bodywork construction.

In 1956, Watsonian took over the rights to the Swallow Sidecars name from Tube Investments. Watsonian was an early supplier to the Swallow Sidecar Company, which after World War II was renamed to Jaguar Cars. From 1956, Watsonian started to manufacture sidecar bodies in glass-reinforced plastic (GRP). As well as civilian models, they also manufactured sidecars for the RAC to use for roadside rescue.

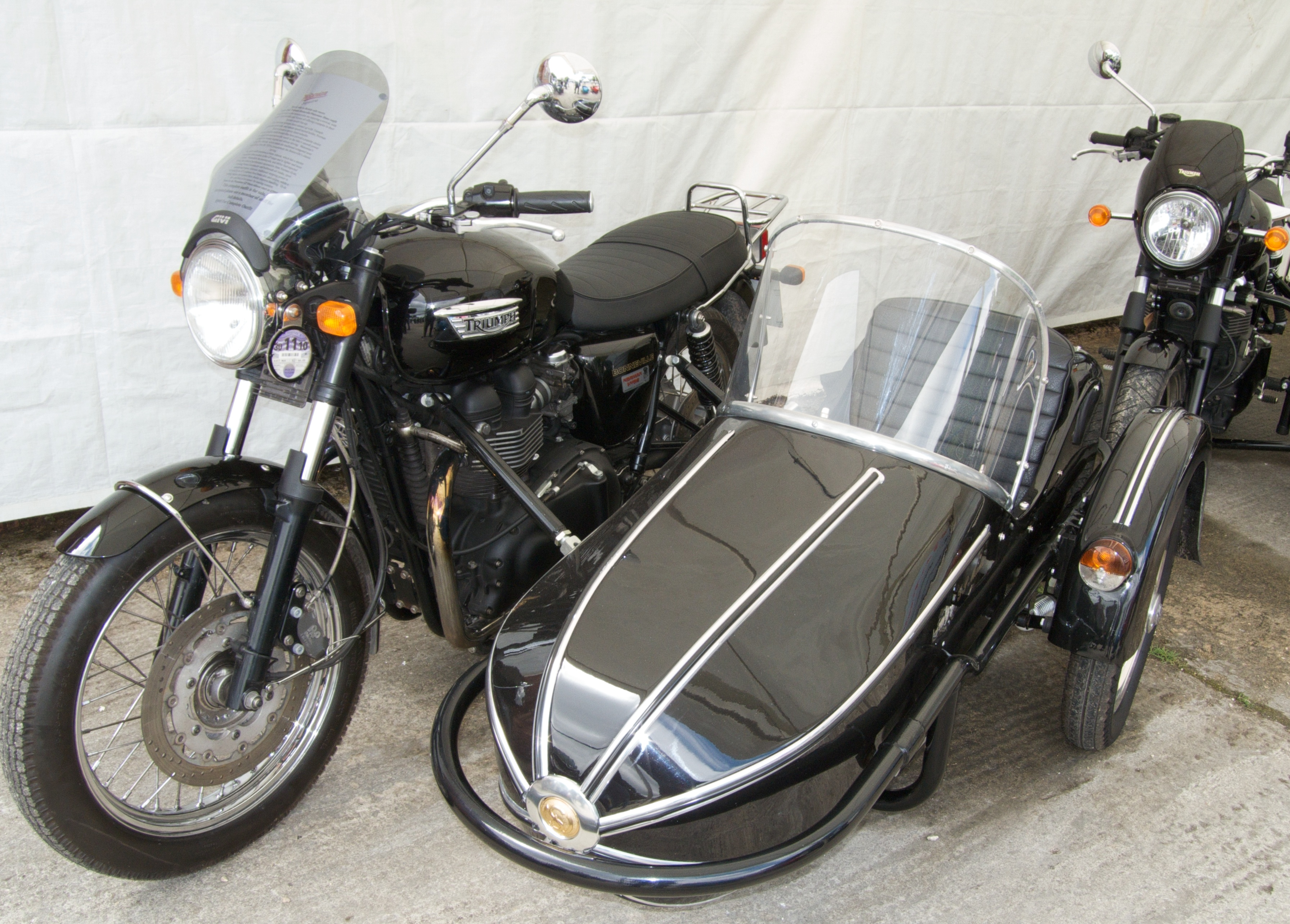
Modern Triumph motorcycle with Watsonian sidecar

The evolving landscape of personal transportation in the 1960s, characterized by the increasing affordability of small cars such as the Reliant Regal and the Mini, contributed to a decline in sidecar sales. In response, Watsonian diversified its operations into automotive bodywork manufacturing, using their expertise in GRP to produce hardtops for Land Rover and for sports cars. When the Land Rover contract ended in 1981, Watsonian was forced to scale back production and make several staff redundant. In 1984, the company moved to its current location in Blockley.

In 1988, Watsonian merged with Squire Sidecars to form Watsonian Squire.

Following the merger, Watsonian-Squire focused on rationalising their product line and optimizing production methods. Towards the end of the 20th century, a renewed interest in sidecars emerged, coinciding with the introduction of modern classic motorcycles such as the Triumph Bonneville 790. Appearances in popular culture, including the television programme Two Fat Ladies and the film Harry Potter and the Deathly Hallows – Part 1, have contributed to maintaining the visibility of the sidecar.

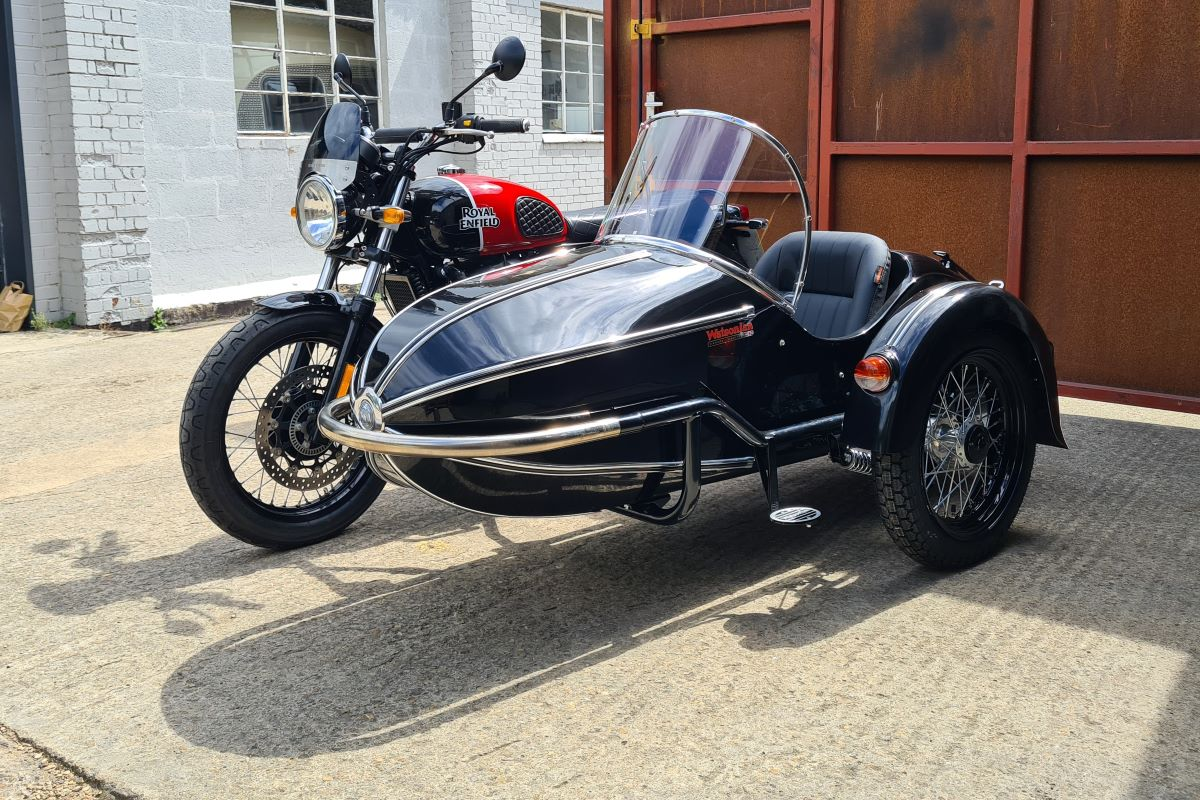

From 1999 until 2013, Watsonian were the UK distributor for Royal Enfield motorcycles Royal Enfield which are now built in Chennai, India.

== Squire ==
Squire (founded 1973 in Bidford-on-Avon) is a British manufacturer of motorcycle sidecars that pioneered the design of the modern motorcycle trailer for being pulled behind a bike in the early 1980s. In 1988 Squire merged with the struggling Watsonian company to form Watsonian Squire, now the UK's largest sidecar producer.

In 2002 Motor Cycle News set a Guinness World Record for a motorcycle and trailer reaching a timed speed of 139.5 mph at Millbrook in Bedfordshire, UK, pulling a Squire D21 trailer behind a Kawasaki ZZ-R1100 motorcycle.
