= Motorcycle ambulance =

Type of emergency vehicle

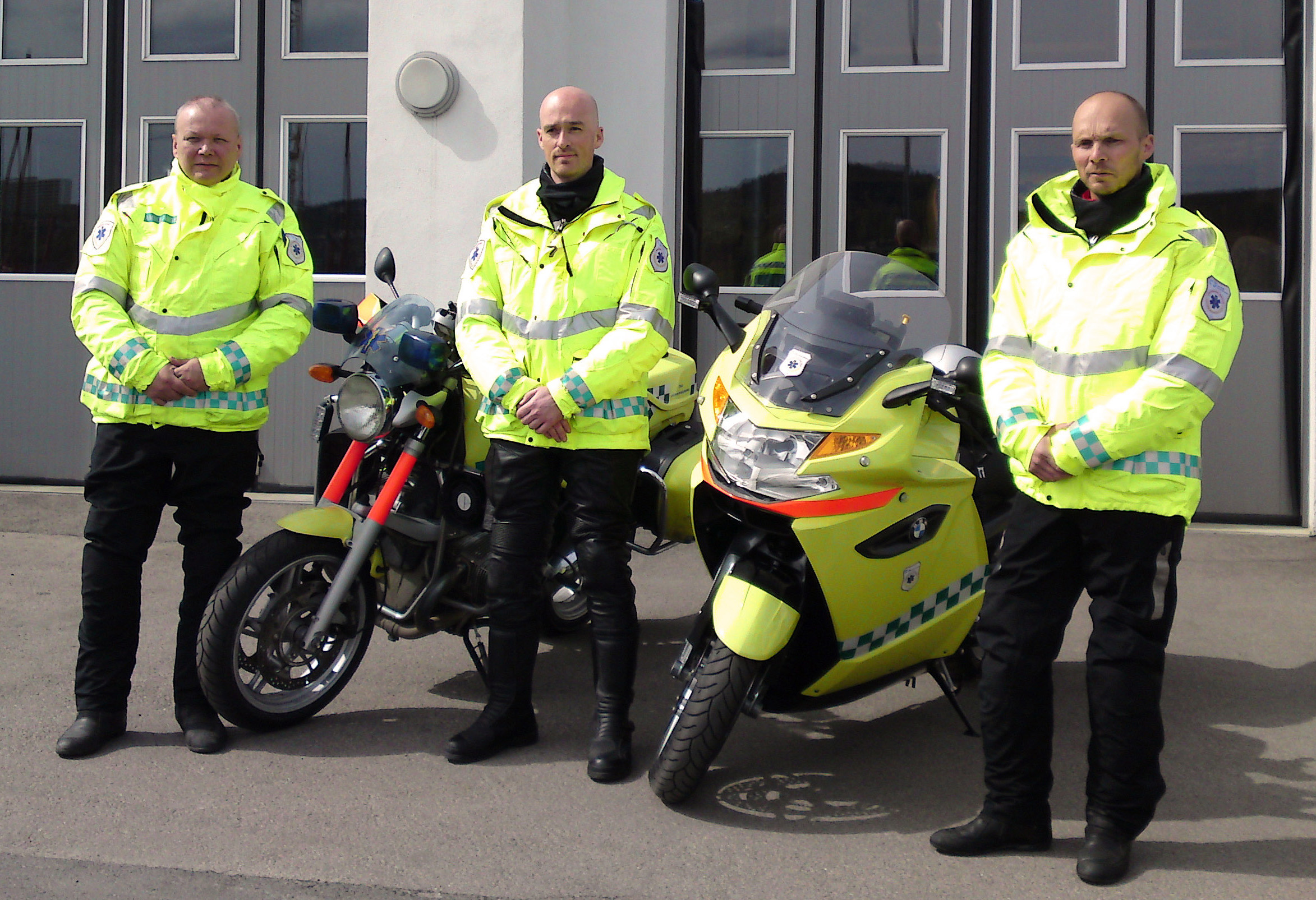
Riders with two types of motorcycle ambulances in Norway

A motorcycle ambulance is a type of emergency response vehicle which carries either a solo paramedic, emergency medical technician, or first responder to a patient; or may also be used with a trailer or sidecar for transporting patients. Because of its small size and agile performance, a motorcycle ambulance is able to respond to a medical emergency much faster than a car or conventional ambulance vehicle in heavy traffic, which can increase survival rates for critically ill patients, especially those in cardiac arrest.

== History ==
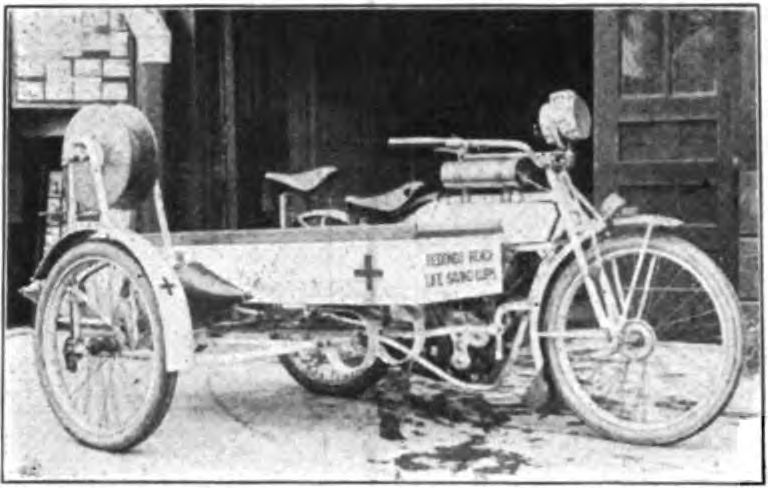
Beach life guard motorcycle, Redondo Beach, California, 1915

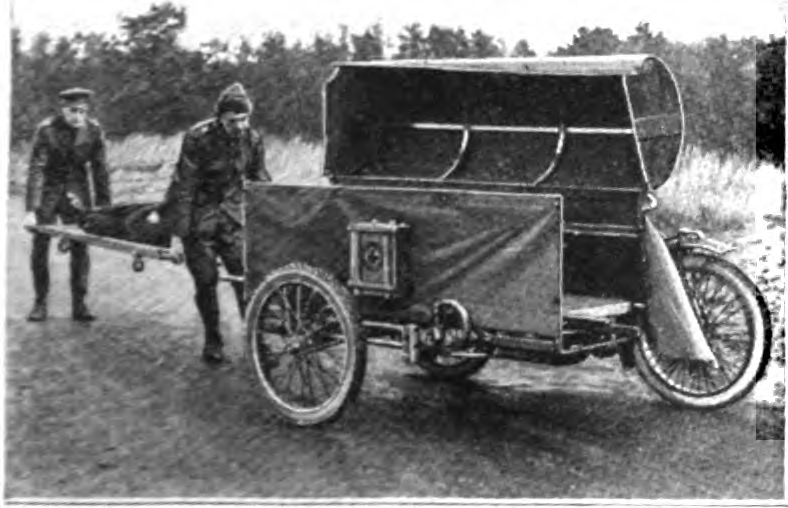
Demonstration of loading wounded soldiers into motorcycle ambulance, 1918.

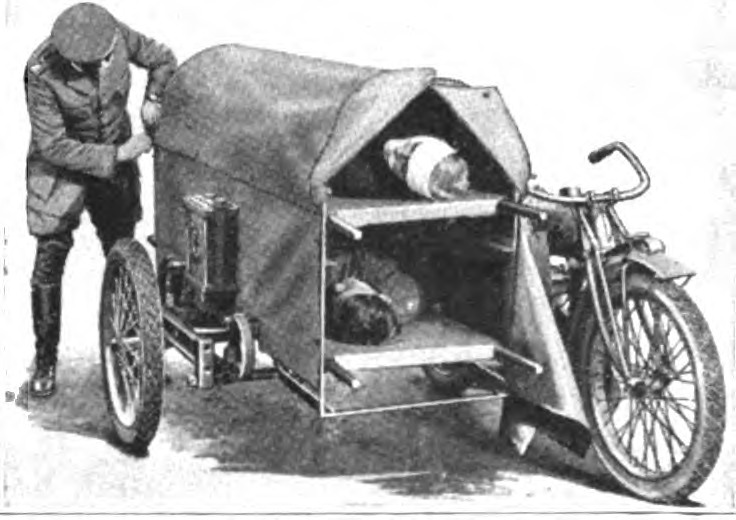
Attaching cover and end curtains.

Motorcycle ambulances were used during World War I by the British, French, and Americans. At the time, the advantages of light weight, speed, and mobility over larger vehicles was cited as the motive for the use of motorcycles with sidecar in this role. The US version had two stretchers arranged one on top of the other. The French ambulance used a sidecar that held a single patient, who could either lie down or sit up.

The British Red Cross Society used an 8 brake horsepower (6.0 kilowatts) NUT motorcycle with a double-deck sidecar similar to the US version. During testing, it needed only a 9 feet (2.7 metres) turning area, versus 35 feet (11 metres) for a motor car ambulance, and had a lower fuel consumption of 55 to 65 miles per US gallon (4.3 to 3.6 litres per 100 kilometres; 66 to 78 miles per imperial gallon), compared with 12 to 17 miles per US gallon (20 to 14 litres per 100 kilometres; 14 to 20 miles per imperial gallon) for car ambulances. Due to lighter weight, they were said to be less likely to get stuck, and could be pushed out more easily than a large vehicle.

Sidecar ambulances were used in Redondo Beach, California in 1915, stationed at a bath house at a beach resort to reach drowning victims quickly. Prior to using the motorcycle, lifeguards had to run or row up to several miles along the beach to respond to calls. The Knightsbridge Animal Hospital and Institute, London, was using a sidecar ambulance to transport dogs in 1912; this mode was still in use in 1937 by the Maryland Humane Society. The International Fire & EMS Motorcycle Response Unit Association (IMRUA) was founded in 2009 in Hungary with the goal of improving already existing MRU's and also promoting the use of MRU's internationally.

== Worldwide motorcycle ambulances ==
=== Australia ===
==== New South Wales ====
In 1993, the Ambulance Service of New South Wales was the first ambulance service in Australia to introduce Motorcycle Rapid Response Team, crewed with an intensive care or mobile intensive care ambulance paramedic. Two BMW K100RT motorcycles were borrowed from the New South Wales Police Force Highway Patrol, with riders undertaking the police motorcycle course. At present there are two motorcycle rapid response crews covering the Sydney CBD at any one time utilising Yamaha FJR1300 motorcycles.

With Sydney's narrow streets, the Sydney Harbour Bridge, numerous parklands, and areas difficult to access in a conventional ambulance the 'rapid responder' motorcycles are able to arrive on scene and begin critical treatment of patients several minutes before the arrival of a conventional ambulance whilst still carrying most of the essential equipment of a full-size ambulance. It takes an average six minutes for a motorcycle rapid response paramedic to reach an emergency situation in the CBD, compared to twelve minutes for ambulances.

==== South Australia ====
In South Australia, there are paramedics who ride on a cycle or motorcycle; they complement the regular ambulances and are used in areas which might have less space to accommodate a bigger vehicle.

==== Victoria ====
In 2012, Ambulance Victoria introduced the Motorcycle Paramedic Unit, equipped with six motorcycle paramedics for rapid response to emergencies. Different types of motorcycles have been trialed, including the initial roll out of Piaggio 500cc, which has now been replaced with the BMW F700GS. The unit operates during peak traffic and during major events and festivals, within Melbourne's inner metro area.

=== Brazil ===
Since 2000, the São Paulo Fire Department has operated Honda motorcycle ambulances (Portuguese: Motos Operacionais de Bombeiros, known as 'MOBs') in a first responder role, to offset the influence of traffic on the response times of traditional ambulances. The motorcycles carry a variety of emergency care equipment (including basic extrication, technical rescue, and firefighting gear), and are always deployed in two-man teams, with the lead vehicle carrying a first aid kit and intravenous fluids and the rear vehicle carrying more advanced equipment, including an automated external defibrillator, suction devices, and emergency delivery kits.

Fire departments in other states, such as Minas Gerais, Mato Grosso do Sul, and Pernambuco, have also adopted motorcycle ambulances since 2008. In August 2008, SAMU, the federal emergency medical services, purchased 400 motorcycle ambulances to be deployed nationwide between December 2008 and 2009.

=== France ===
In France Emergency Medical Service have some emergency motocycle. The Paris SMUR 92 (Service Médical, d'Urgence et de Réanimatrion = Emergency Medical and Reanimation Unit ) is equipped with motocycle. They are called for street demonstration in case of medical emergency or difficult acces road. They are per groupe of 4.

Moto du samu 92

=== Germany ===
The Bavarian Red Cross has operated motorcycle ambulances since 1983. As of 2011, they report a fleet of 25 motorcycles and 100 volunteer paramedics.

The Johanniter-Unfall-Hilfe (St. John Ambulance Service, Germany) has over 115 motorcycles throughout Germany, staffed by volunteers. The following motorcycle types are used: BMW R1100RT, BMW R1150RT, BMW R1200RT, BMW R1250RT, BMW R1150GS, BMW R1200GS, BMW F650GS, BMW F750GS, BMW F850GS, along with others from Honda, Suzuki, KTM. Some of the motorcycles are bought at the factory, or they are taken over by the military police or civilian police. Only a few are expanded themselves. The motorcycle units are used as: Civil Protection: (detector, pilot, security vehicle for columns of operational units); medical service at major events, such as cycling races, running events, city festivals, church conventions, BMW Marathon Berlin; First Responder; Jam aid; public relations.

=== Ghana ===
The Okoa Project began operating and manufacturing tricycle motorcycle ambulances in Ghana in February 2020, when they established their second international post in Tumu, Sissala East District. The Okoa Project is a non-profit dedicated to providing critical, life saving emergency transport to maternity patients, as well as all those ill or injured in need of essential health services. In April 2020, The Okoa Project began its response to the COVID-19 pandemic, using their motorcycle ambulances to distribute hand washing stations, soap, and personal protective equipment (PPE) to rural communities in the Sissala East District in Northern Ghana.

=== Hong Kong ===
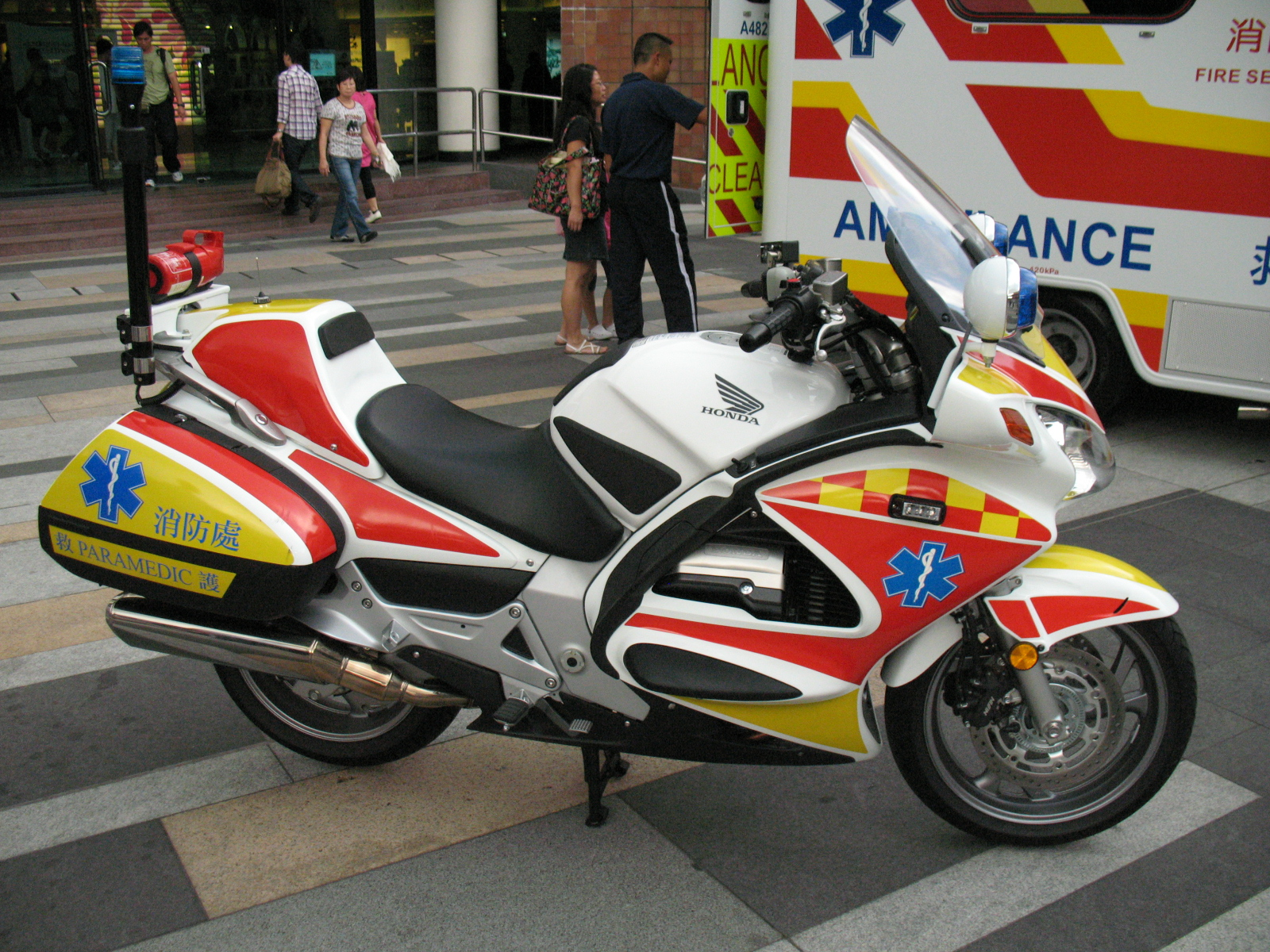
Honda ST1300P in Hong Kong.

According to the book Rescue Mission which is written by an Emergency Medical Assistant of Hong Kong Fire Services Department, the HKFSD established the first motorcycle programme in 1982. At first, there are only two motorcycles stationed in Morrison Hill Ambulance Depot. In 1986, the HKFSD found that motorcycles are useful for responding to medical calls, so they bought seven more motorcycles in 1987. In 1989, the motorcycle team had 15 motorcycles and stationed in several ambulance depots. As of December 2023, the HKFSD has 35 motorcycles.

Auxiliary Medical Service, another government-owned service, also has motorcycles.

=== India ===
Motorcycle ambulance launched in Jalpaiguri, West Bengal, India, during 1998 by social worker Karimul Haque, who received the Padma Shri award in 2017. Ambulances on a motorcycle platform have also been launched in multiple other states of India, such as Chhattisgarh, Maharashtra, and Haryana. These ambulances have provided emergency health services from ferrying pregnant women to a primary health centre to attending to first aid in case of accidents.

=== Israel ===
Israel makes extensive use of "ambucycles". They are particularly associated with the volunteer United Hatzalah, but are also used by Magen David Adom, the national EMS service, which employs a mix of professionals and volunteers.

=== Japan ===
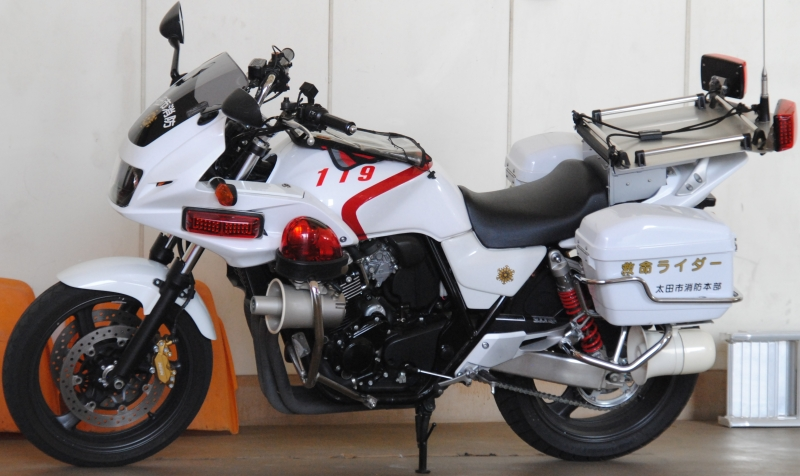
A 'Lifesaving Rider' motorcycle of Ota City Fire Department, Gunma Prefecture.

In some areas of Japan, Japanese fire departments use off-road motorcycles as emergency vehicles. They are useful for negotiating the small streets and heavy traffic in the large urban areas of Japanese cities. Having off-road motorcycles helps in responding to the mountain hills that are around a lot of cities. Some departments would likely have their crews in teams of two or three motorcycles. One of the motorcycles carries a first aid kit and / or automated external defibrillator. The other motorcycles in this team may carry fire fighting and rescue equipment. Most crews are firefighters with training in first responder, first aid, and / or paramedic. Each crew member wears a lightweight fire suit and a fire fighting motorcycle helmet. Many of these motorcycles have their own radio, cargo bays, lights, and sirens.

=== Kenya ===
Kenya launched its first Paramedic Rider in May 2015 during the Mater Heart Run. This was done by Avenue Rescue Services Ltd, a member of the Avenue Group of Healthcare Providers. Avenue Rescue Services launched two motorcycles manned by four riders. The motorcycles are used as first responder during the busy traffic hours, and also for event coverage. The Standard Chattered International Marathon was the second major event to be covered by the ParaRiders. The motorcycles are equipped to handle most medical and surgical emergencies.

As part of the United Kingdom's Department for International Development (DFID) wider £50 million country programme (2009), they are putting in place among other things a new motorcycle ambulance service. The Magunga's Health Centre now operates a motorcycle (sidecar) ambulance service.

Sarah Brown, Global Patron of the White Ribbon Alliance for Safe Motherhood said:

This is yet another great example of Britain leading the way in saving mothers' lives. For a long time, the world has known what needs to be done to reduce the numbers of women dying in pregnancy and childbirth and yet the same numbers of women continue to die. The key to changing the survival chances of mothers and infants is a better investment in health services that vulnerable women can reach. DFID's aid money makes a massive difference because it means countries can invest in facilities and health workers and simple but vital things like motorbike ambulances which can often mean the difference between life or death for women who live a long way from a clinic.

=== Malawi ===
Motorcycle ambulances have been used in remote rural areas in Malawi as a means to improve access to obstetric health care facilities for women in labour or needing prenatal care. Lightweight off-road motorcycles, equipped with a sidecar holding a stretcher for the patient, have been found to be an efficient supplement, but not replacement for, four-wheel drive SUV ambulances. Purchase prices and operating costs have been found to be a fraction of a four-wheeled vehicle, and the sidecar combinations have been found to be less likely to be misused by diverting them for non-healthcare purposes. The lighter sidecar combinations are better able to cope with poor roads and areas that become impassable to heavier cars and trucks during the rainy season. Disadvantages include the reluctance of drivers to travel at night in some cases, and the inability to carry more than one patient at a time.

The report concluded that:

Motorcycle ambulances reduce the delay in referring women with obstetric complications from remote rural health centres to the district hospital, particularly under circumstances where health centres have no access to other transport or means of communication to call for an ambulance. They are also a relatively cheap and effective option for referral of patients in developing countries, particularly in rural areas with little or no public transport. Nineteen motorcycle ambulances can be bought for the price of one Toyota land cruiser car ambulance. Operating costs compare in a similar way. Motorcycle ambulances also potentially help reduce costs for women and their families to access EmOC, although this was not the subject of this study.

=== Poland ===
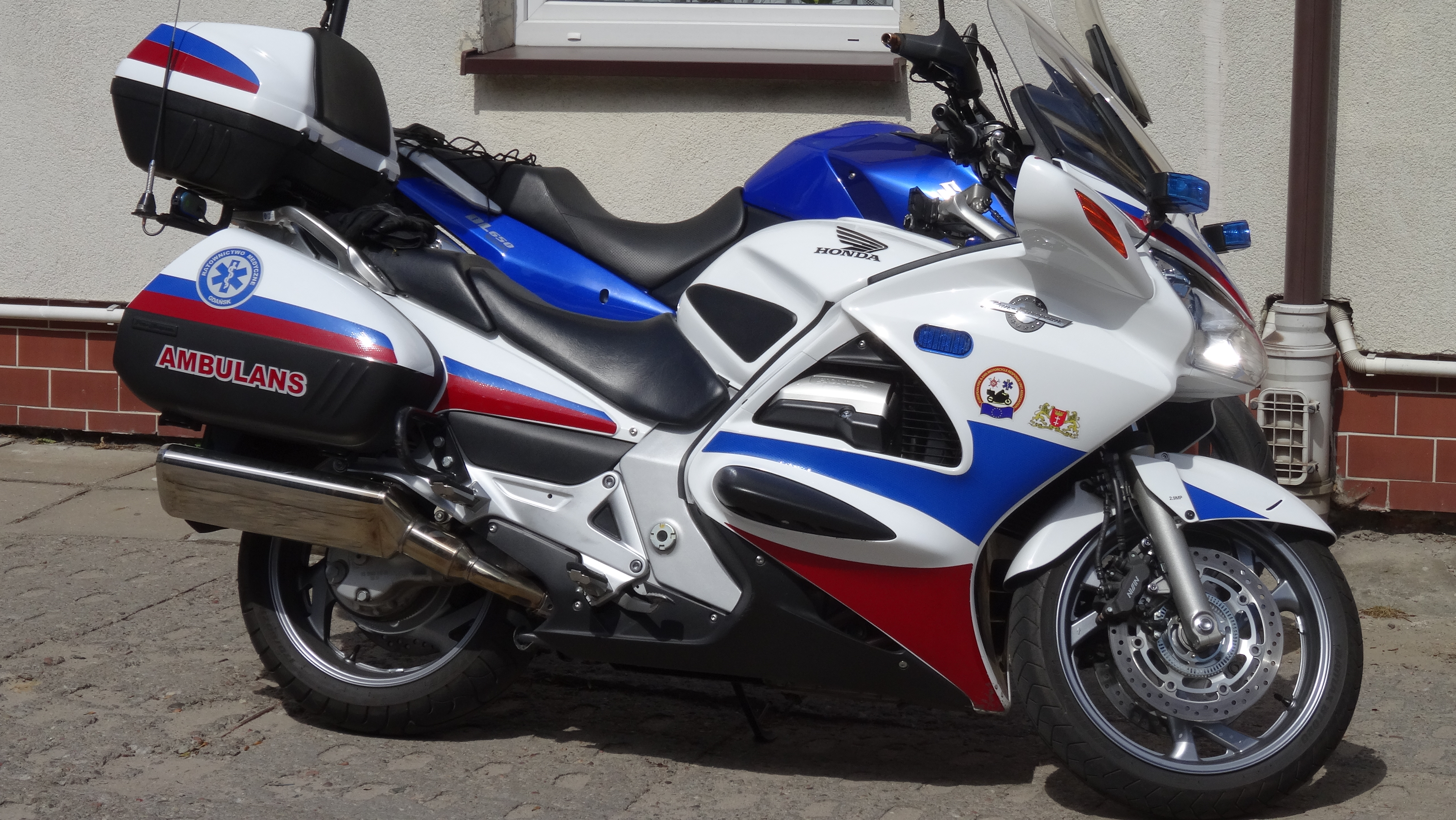
Honda ST1300, Gdańsk, Poland.

In some cities of Poland, emergency units use motorcycles as emergency vehicles. They are useful as they are faster than car / truck in heavy traffic in the city centres. The motorcycles carry usually one or two persons, a first aid kit, and automated external defibrillator. The motorcycles are equipped with radio, cargo bags, lights, and sirens. One of the most active non-profit organisations, using motorcycles as ambulance in capital of Poland, is motorcycling foundation called Fundacja Jednym Śladem. Members of the foundation are first responders, and all of them support Official Polish Rescue System.

=== Portugal ===
Since July 2004, the National Institute of Medical Emergencies (INEM) have included motorcycle ambulances in their services. These fast ambulances are operational within the entire country.

=== Serbia ===
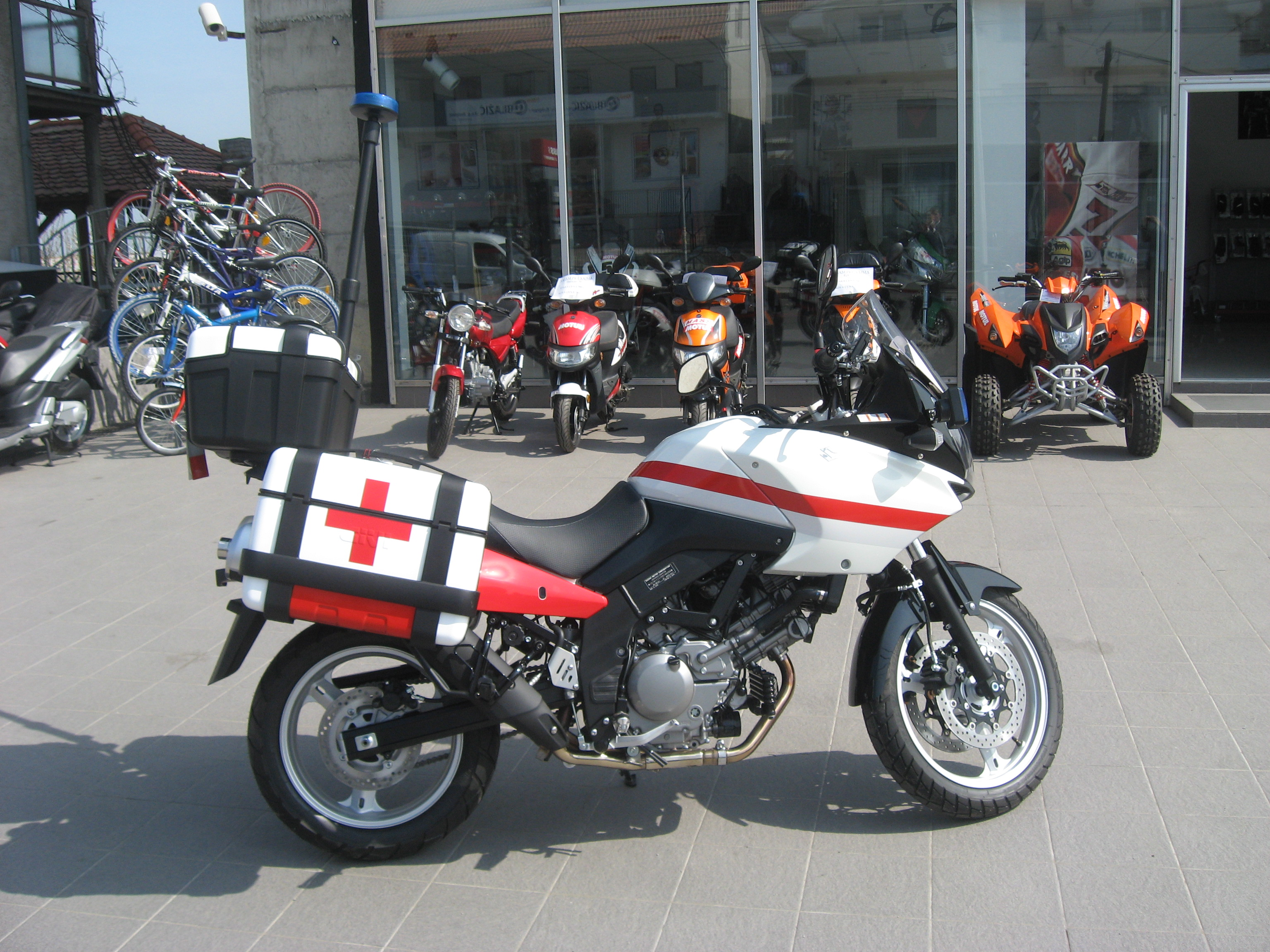
Suzuki V-Strom 650 in Serbia.

The Emergency Medical Service in Belgrade introduced a Suzuki V-Strom 650 in 2011, with the crew consisting of a motorcyclist and a doctor. Panniers and a top-box contain equipment for CPR, bandaging, anti-shock therapy, paramedic, and other equipment.

=== South Africa ===
The South African National Roads Agency through ER24 EMS operates Motorcycle Medical Response Units, these units use a Suzuki V-Strom 650 staffed and equipped at an Intermediate Life Support level to respond on the E-Toll freeway and stabilise patients whilst conventional ambulances make their way through traffic.

=== Southern Sudan ===
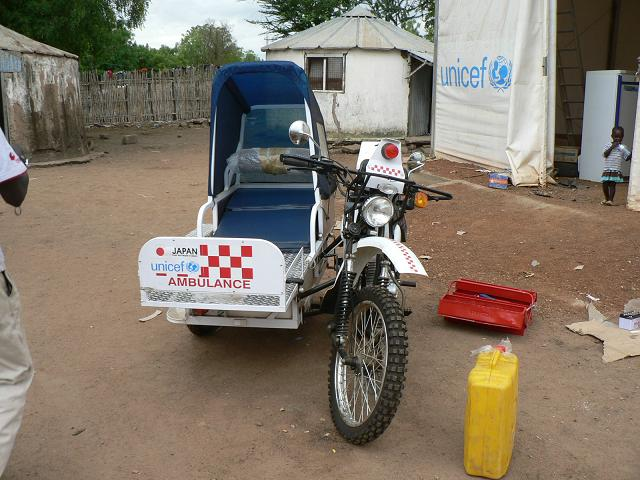
An eRanger motorcycle ambulance in southern Sudan

In March 2009, through a partnership between UNICEF and the Government of Southern Sudan, a lifeline was extended to some pregnant women with the introduction of five motorcycle ambulances in the state of Eastern Equatoria.

The UNICEF Annual Report 2009 concluded that:

The benefits for women in Southern Sudan are already apparent. No deaths were reported among the more than 170 pregnant women who used the service in 2009. Community support has contributed to the success of the initiative. The telephone number to access the service has been posted on trees, broadcast on the radio, and announced in churches. People offer their phones to call the ambulances. In some cases, neighbours help carry the pregnant woman to the nearest pickup spot when a motorcycle cannot reach the woman's home. The special motorcycles are also being used to assist children and adults in need of medical attention.

Since the start of the UNICEF pilot study, additional motorcycle ambulances have been delivered to the region using a Not On Our Watch Awards grant to U.S. fund for UNICEF with the aim of reducing maternal mortality rates in Southern Sudan.

=== Tanzania ===
The Okoa Project began manufacturing motorcycle ambulance trailers in Mbeya, Tanzania in 2018, when they launched their first international post with partner The Olive Branch for Children. The Okoa Project is a non-profit dedicated to providing critical, life saving emergency transport to maternity patients, as well as all those ill or injured in need of essential health services. They worked side by side with Mbeya communities to establish an emergency response system to dispatch the ambulances quickly.

=== Uganda ===
In the Mbale town and district in Uganda, the Partnerships Overseas Networking Trust (PONT), initiated the deployment of motorcycle ambulances in December 2010. The motorcycle ambulance work started with 5 eRanger motorbike ambulances. These vehicles are in use 24/7 and are providing life saving emergency transport to maternity emergencies and to the ill and injured.

32 eRanger motorbike ambulances which, were funded in part by Rotary Clubs, have now been deployed in Mbale.

A team of Welsh paramedics are saving lives six thousand miles from their Pontypridd base.

They're a key part of the PONT charity, which is supplying a fleet of motorcycle ambulances to Mbale, in Uganda. The remote, mountainous region has virtually no emergency service and desperately-ill people often have to find their own way to medical help.

But now the motorcycle ambulances – funded by the Rotary Club – and drivers trained by the PONT team are helping thousands of local people reach help.

In March 2014, Pulse Village Transport in Kampala began manufacturing and distributing their product, the Village Ambulance, throughout Uganda. Their Village Ambulance is a custom-built trailer that can easily attach to virtually any motorcycle or bicycle and is designed for rough terrain and the hard to reach places. It was created to meet the medical transportation needs of rural communities and refugee settlements, with a primary focus on maternal / child health. As of November 2014, they had distributed Village Ambulances to communities in over 25 districts of Uganda.

=== United Kingdom ===
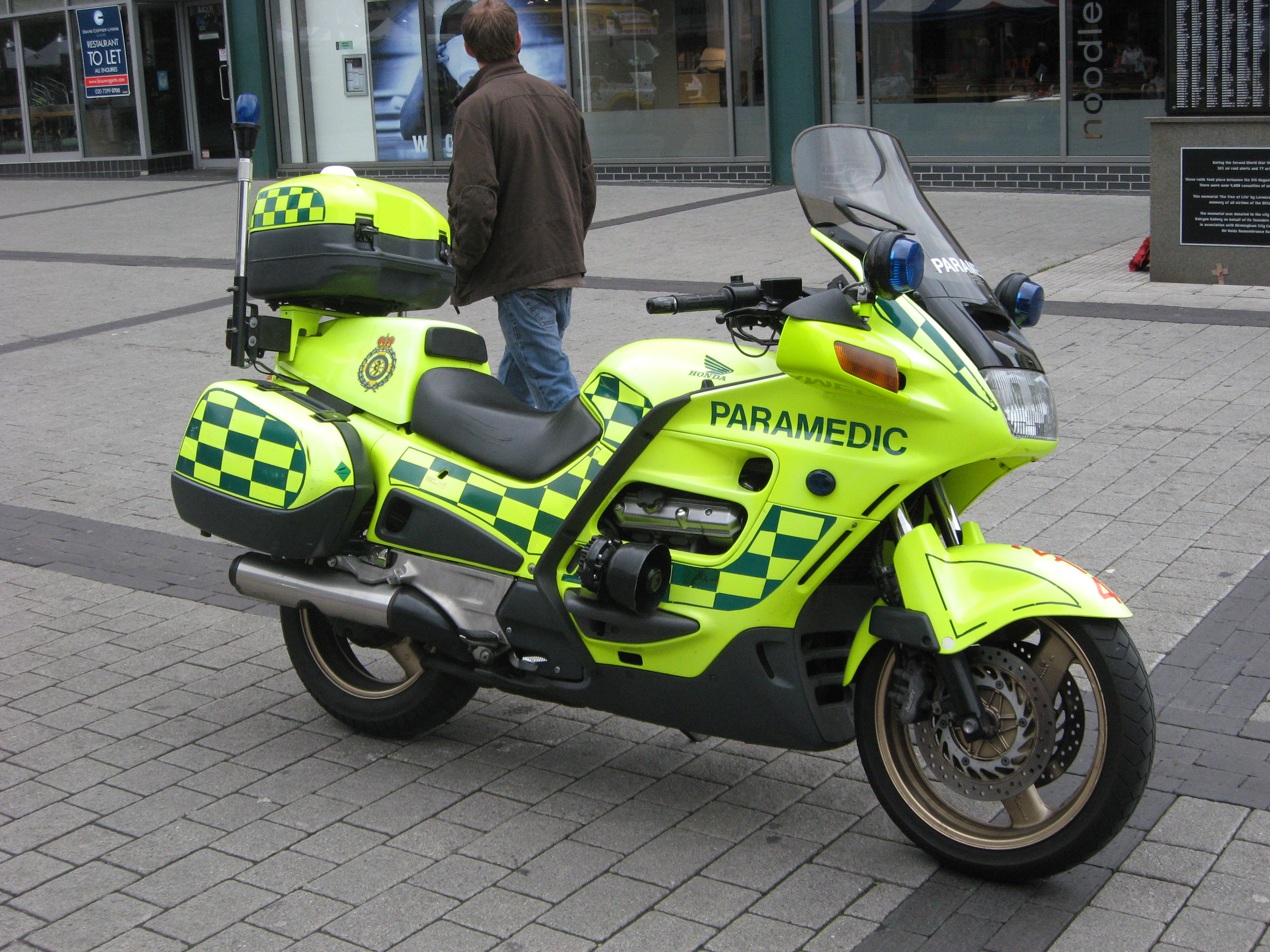
A Honda ST1100 paramedic motorcycle in Birmingham

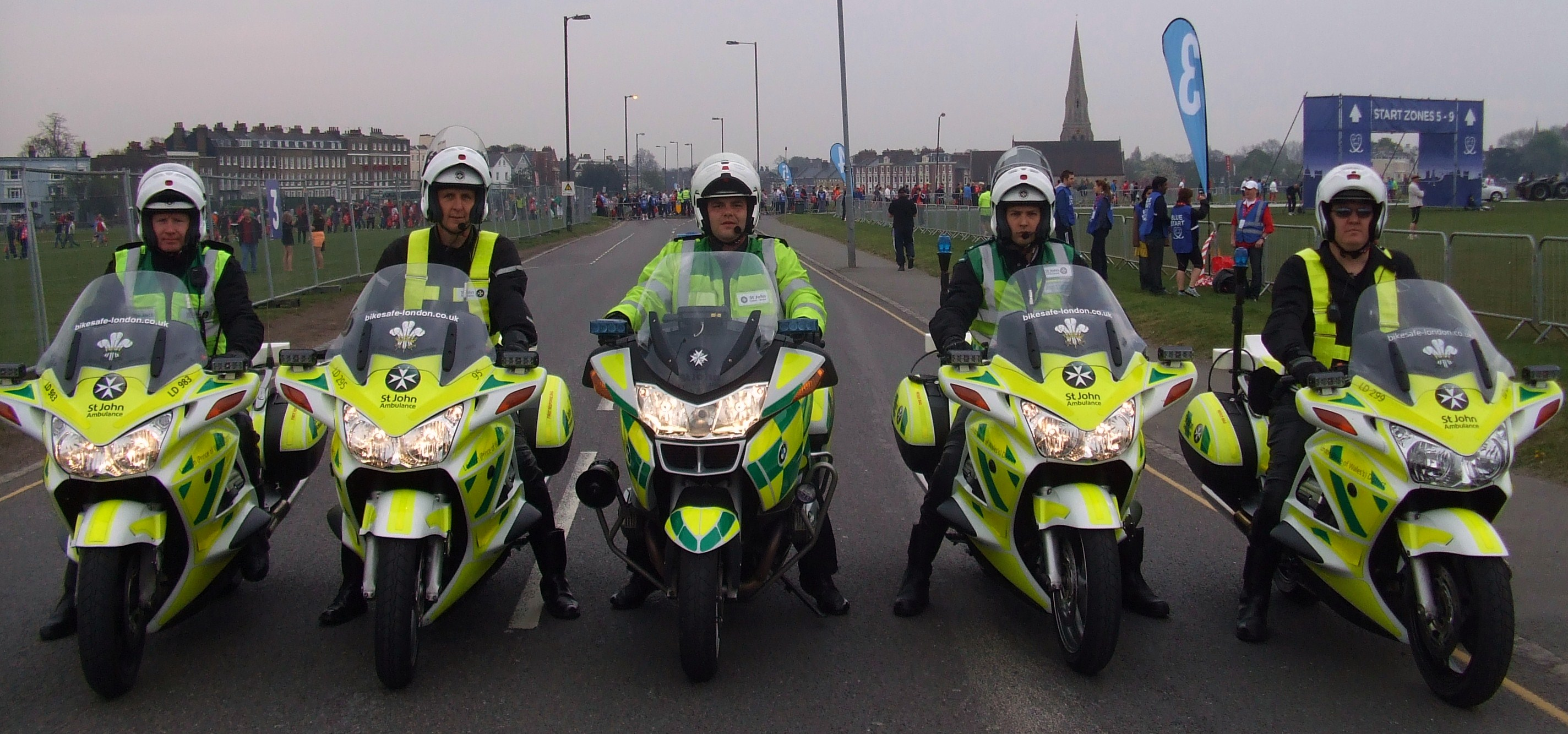
Honda ST1300 and BMW R1200RT-P St John Ambulance and St John Cymru Wales motorcycles in London

Motorcycle paramedics first began in the United Kingdom as a trial program in 1991, but quickly proved themselves by being the first to respond in congested areas.

Motorcycles are used as rapid response vehicles by NHS emergency medical services, and MCP Medical in the United Kingdom.

St John Ambulance England ran a motorcycle response team out of then Prince of Wales London District until the early 2010s due to costs of an ageing fleet of motorcycles, cost of replacement fleet, and the economical return of the service led to the service being withdrawn.

=== United States ===
Daytona Beach Fire Rescue in Florida has been using pairs of motorcycles since 1994 to help with response times during heavy congestion surrounding major events in the Daytona Beach area. They currently operate two Harley Davidson FLHPI Road King motorcycles. Miami-Dade County, also in Florida used motorcycles for faster response times after a 2004 pilot programme. They had significant success, but the programme was cut in 2008 due to budget problems. The programme is credited with cutting response times in half. Austin-Travis County EMS of Austin, Texas is using a fleet of four BMW G650 X-Ps and two BMW R1200RT to supplement the standard ambulance response. As of 2011, the motorcycles were deployed only for special events and times of unusually high traffic congestion, but the county planned to make them a regular system resource. MSET (Motorcycle Special Events Team of Texas) is a Texas Department of State Health Services (DSHS) registered First Responder Organization (FRO), and is composed of volunteer Emergency Medical Technicians and FCC licensed Amateur Radio Operators on motorcycles. MSET is active in and outside the Austin community, supporting both mobile and stand-by events, such as bicycle races and festivals.

=== Zambia ===
In 2009, a social enterprise called Zambikes designed one of the first models of the ambulance trailer called the 'Zambulance'. The Zambulance is a locally built ambulance trailer that can be pulled behind any bicycle or motorcycle. Zambikes' vision for the Zambulance is to connect rural African villages to critical medical treatment. Since 2009, they have distributed units throughout Zambia and also exported to Malawi.

== Manufacturers ==
Honda, BMW, and Yamaha motorcycles are common models used in many countries and departments. A number of manufacturers produce sidecars for motorcycles and scooters. Active motorcycle ambulance manufacturers include The Okoa Project, a non-profit focused on improving rural maternal health that manufactures motorcycle ambulances in Ghana and Tanzania, The Ranger Production Company, and Riders for Health, a charity which manufactures the Uhuru in Zimbabwe, and Zambikes in Zambia, and Pulse, a social enterprise which manufactures the Village Ambulance in Uganda.

== See also ==
- Nontransporting EMS vehicle
- Blood bike
- Fire motorcycle
- Police motorcycle
- Cycle responder
