= Wasp Motorcycles =

British motorcycle manufacturer

- Company type: Private
- Industry: Motorcycle
- Founded: 1964
- Founder: Robin Rhind-Tutt
- Headquarters: Dunkeswell, Devon EX14 4RS, United Kingdom
- Products: Motorcycle sidecars and frames
- Website: Wasp Motorcycles

Wasp Motorcycles is a British motorcycle and sidecar manufacturer that specialises in building competition solo and sidecar machines for motocross, trials and sidecar grasstrack, as well as the Wasp 3 Wheel Freedom for disabled riders.

Wasp first saw racing success in 1971, when it won the European Championship. Wasp sidecars have been the winning chassis eight times in the FIM Sidecarcross European and World Championship. In 1972, all of the top eight places in the European Championship were riding Wasp outfits.

== History ==
Wasp was founded in 1964 by engineer and off-road motorcyclist Robin 'Robbie' Rhind-Tutt, who was originally employed by the Ministry of Defence as an engineering apprentice at Boscombe Down. He designed and built a number of off-road motorcycle frames which he used in motocross competitions. Other competitors were interested in Rhind-Tutt's frames and commissioned him to build specialist frames, so he decided to form Wasp Motorcycles Ltd. The company changed its name to Wasp Engineering Ltd in 1997, but continues to trade under the name of Wasp Motorcycles.

The company was based at Berwick St James, near Salisbury, Wiltshire, where Rhind-Tutt had been born and brought up. Rhind-Tutt died in September 2019, aged 78. Around that time the company was at Dinton, still in the Salisbury area; in 2024 it opened on a business park at Dunkeswell, near Honiton, Devon.

A Wasp/BSA motocross sidecar outfit ridden by former world motocross champion Dave Bickers was used in the 1979 World War II film Escape to Athena, disguised to look like a German military BMW R75.

== Products ==
Wasp manufacture and modify sidecar motocross, sidecar grasstrack ('side-car-cross'), and solo motocross motorcycles. They also produce motorcycle leading link suspension for sidecars and fork conversion kits for road bikes to improve braking and handling, and they manufacture Métisse frames pioneered by Rickman Motorcycles.

== Wasp 3 Wheel Freedom ==
The 3 Wheel Freedom is designed for use by disabled riders, including paraplegic motorcyclists, and has an electrically operated ramp to help access. With a tubular space frame bonded to fibreglass body it has independent suspension and a twin-piston brake connected to the motorcycle brakes. The design of the sidecar enables it to carry a wheelchair and it can be attached to any motorcycle of over 500 cc.
