= Sidecar =

One-wheeled device attached to a two-wheeled vehicle

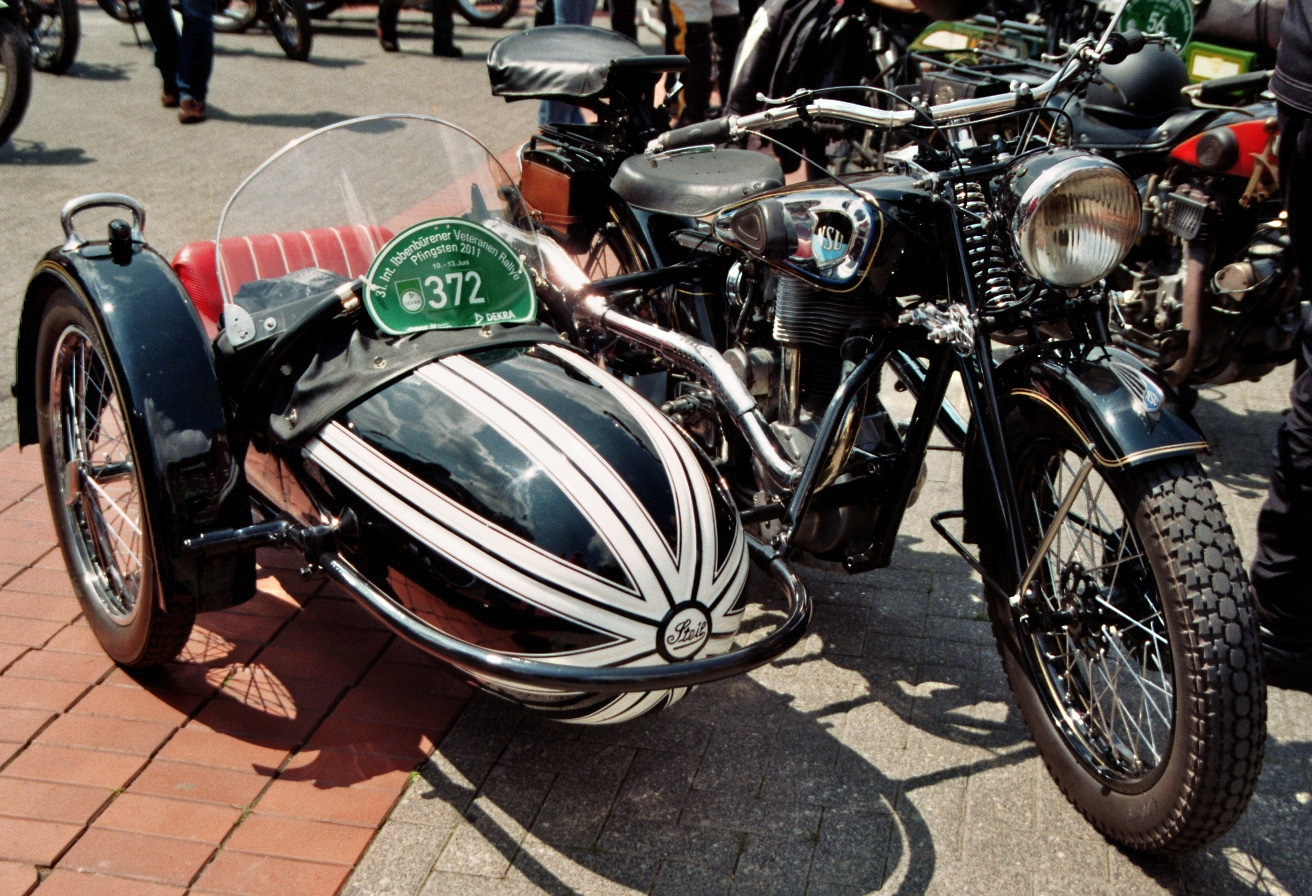
An NSU Motorenwerke 601 motorcycle from the 1930s fitted with a Steib Metallbau sidecar

A sidecar is a one-wheeled device attached to the side of a motorcycle, scooter, or bicycle, making the whole a three-wheeled vehicle. The combination of a motorcycle with a sidecar is sometimes called a hack, outfit, rig, tricycle, or tuk-tuk.

== History ==
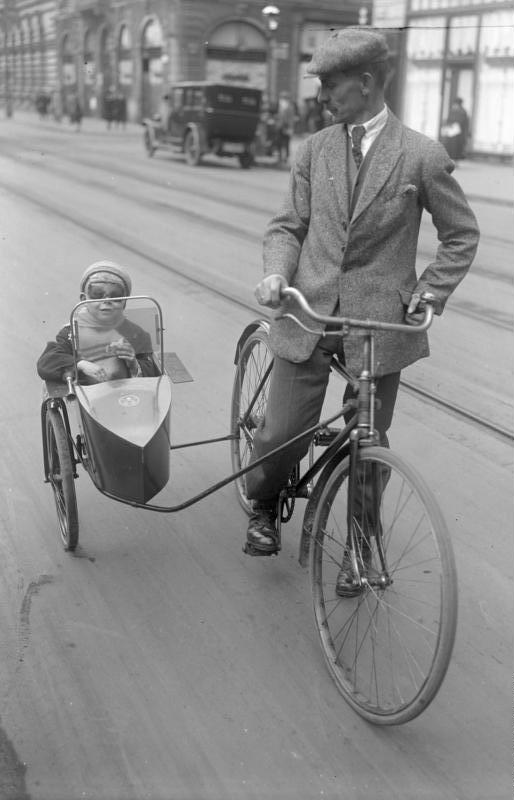
German bicycle sidecar carrying a child, 1927

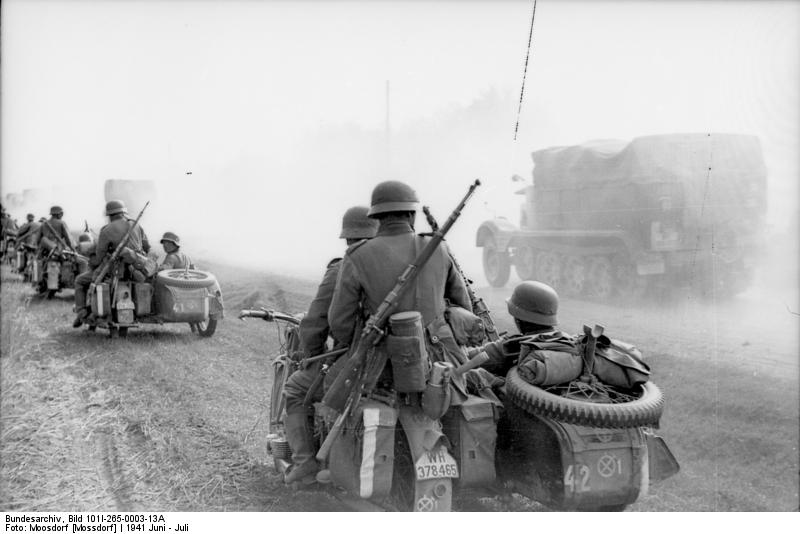
German troops on motorcycles with sidecars invading the Soviet Union during Operation Barbarossa

Jean Bertoux, a French army officer, secured a prize offered by a French newspaper in 1893 for the best method of carrying a passenger on a bicycle. The sidecar wheel was mounted on the same lateral plane as the bicycle's rear and was supported by a triangulation of tubes from the bicycle. A sprung seat with back rest was mounted above the cross-member and a footboard hung below. A sidecar appeared in a cartoon by George Moore in the January 7, 1903, issue of the British newspaper Motor Cycling. Three weeks later, a provisional patent was granted to Mr. W. J. Graham of Graham Brothers, Enfield, Middlesex. He partnered with Jonathan A. Kahn to begin production.

One of Britain's oldest sidecar manufacturers, Watsonian, was founded in 1912. It is still trading as Watsonian Squire. Automobile producer Jaguar Cars was founded in 1922 as a sidecar manufacturer, the Swallow Sidecar Company.

In 1913, American inventor Hugo Young, of Loudonville, Ohio, designed a new sidecar which was not rigidly fixed to the motorcycle. Instead, his invention employed a flexible connection, which allowed the sidecar to turn, raise, and lower without affecting the balance of the motorcycle. This was a great improvement over the original design, allowing for much safer and more comfortable experiences for both the passenger and driver. Young opened up the Flxible Sidecar Company (the first "e" was dropped to allow for trademarking the name) in Loudonville, Ohio and soon became the largest sidecar manufacturer in the world (the company closed in 1996). When the motorcycle craze began to fade in the 1920s due to more affordable cars being marketed, as well as the banishment of sidecar racing in the United States, the Flxible Sidecar Company began producing transit buses, ambulances, and hearses.

Until the 1950s sidecars were quite popular, providing a cheap alternative to passenger cars; they have also been used by armed forces, police and the UK's AA and RAC motoring organisations.

== Design ==
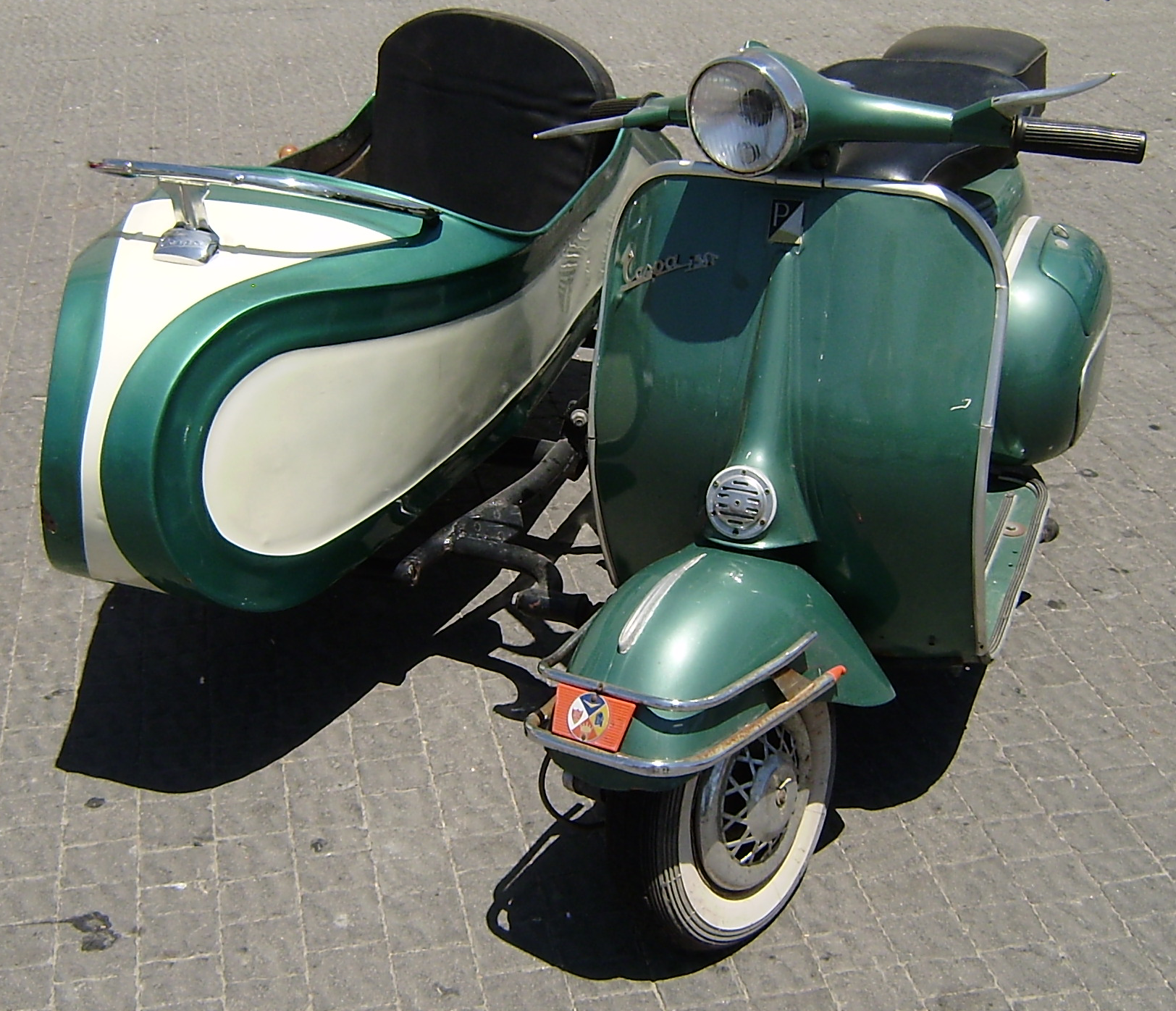
Sidecar on Vespa scooter

A sidecar motorcycle is a three-wheeled vehicle with the side wheel not directly aligned with the rear motorcycle wheel, and is usually powered by the rear wheel only. This is different from a motor tricycle (trike), where both rear wheels are powered and share a common axle. However, either P.V. Mokharov of the Soviet Union or H.P. Baughn of Great Britain seem to have been the first to employ a driven sidecar wheel in 1929. Baughn two-wheel-drive outfits were so successful in trials events in the early 1930s that there were attempts to have the ACU ban them from competition. A great many companies experimented with two-wheel drive in sporting events and indeed many companies employed them in military vehicles prior to the commencement of World War II. Currently, the Russian manufacturer Ural produces several models with two-wheel drive that can be engaged as desired.

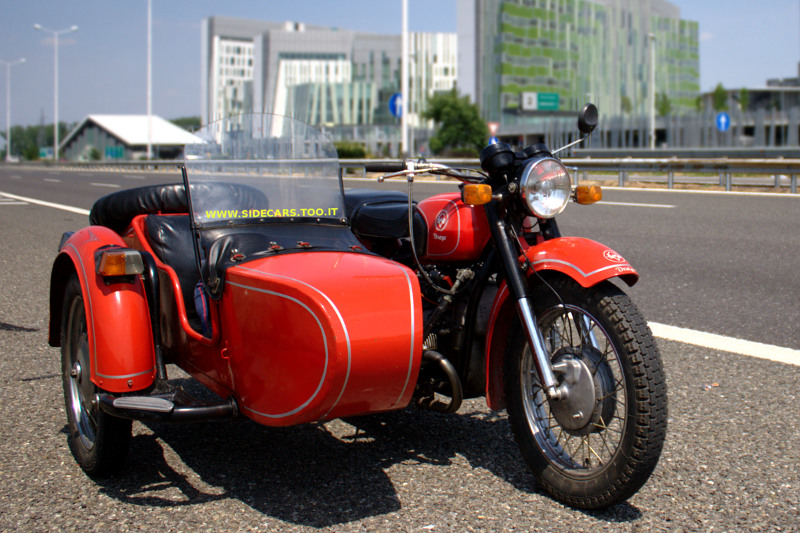
Ukrainian Dnepr mt 10 with sidecar

The sidecar consists of a frame and of a body. The frame may either be fixed to the bike, or it may be attached in a way which makes the bike able to lean in the same manner as bikes without sidecars. Also, Ural had a reversible sidecar for the European market.

The body typically provides one passenger seat and a small trunk compartment behind. In some cases the sidecar has a removable soft top. In some modifications, the sidecar's body is used for carrying cargo or tools, like a truck's platform. The sidecar is typically mounted so that the motorcycle is closer to the centre of the road, i.e. with the sidecar on the right for right-hand traffic.

== Handling ==
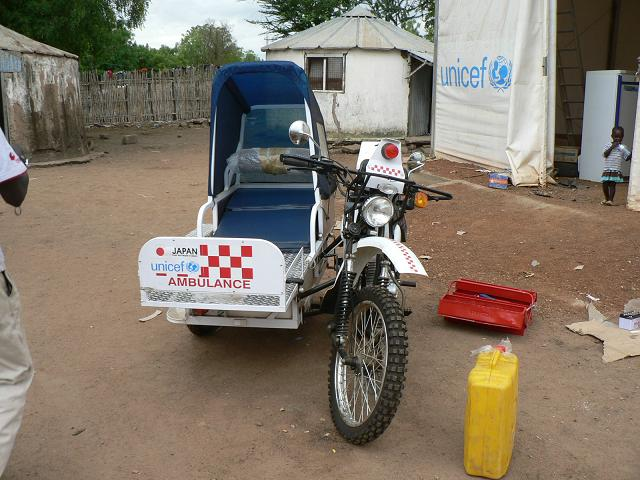
An eRanger motorcycle ambulance in southern Sudan

A sidecar makes the bike asymmetrical. A fixed mounted rig with right mounted sidecar can go faster in left turns than in right turns because the sidecar prevents it from tipping over. In right turns, they can tip over if curves are taken too fast. Some techniques can be used to take a right curve faster without tipping, like usage of the brake on the sidecar, if one is fitted.

While a sidecar pilot is described as driving rather than riding, the comparison to a car is weak with all but the heaviest rigs. Driver and passenger body position affect higher speed handling, especially on dirt or other uneven surfaces. If the sidecar and bike geometry are not coordinated the combination will be unstable, especially at speed, with shimmy upon acceleration or deceleration.

In rigid mounted rigs, leaning the motorcycle by clamping it rigidly a few degrees away from the sidecar is used along with a few degrees of "toe-in" of the sidecar wheel toward the centerline of the vehicle to allow for road camber and provide a balance resulting in comfortable, straight line travel. Most sidecars are also fitted with steering damping devices of either friction or hydraulic type to lessen the effects of sudden inputs, as encountered on rough roads, upon the vehicle's handling.

== Sport ==
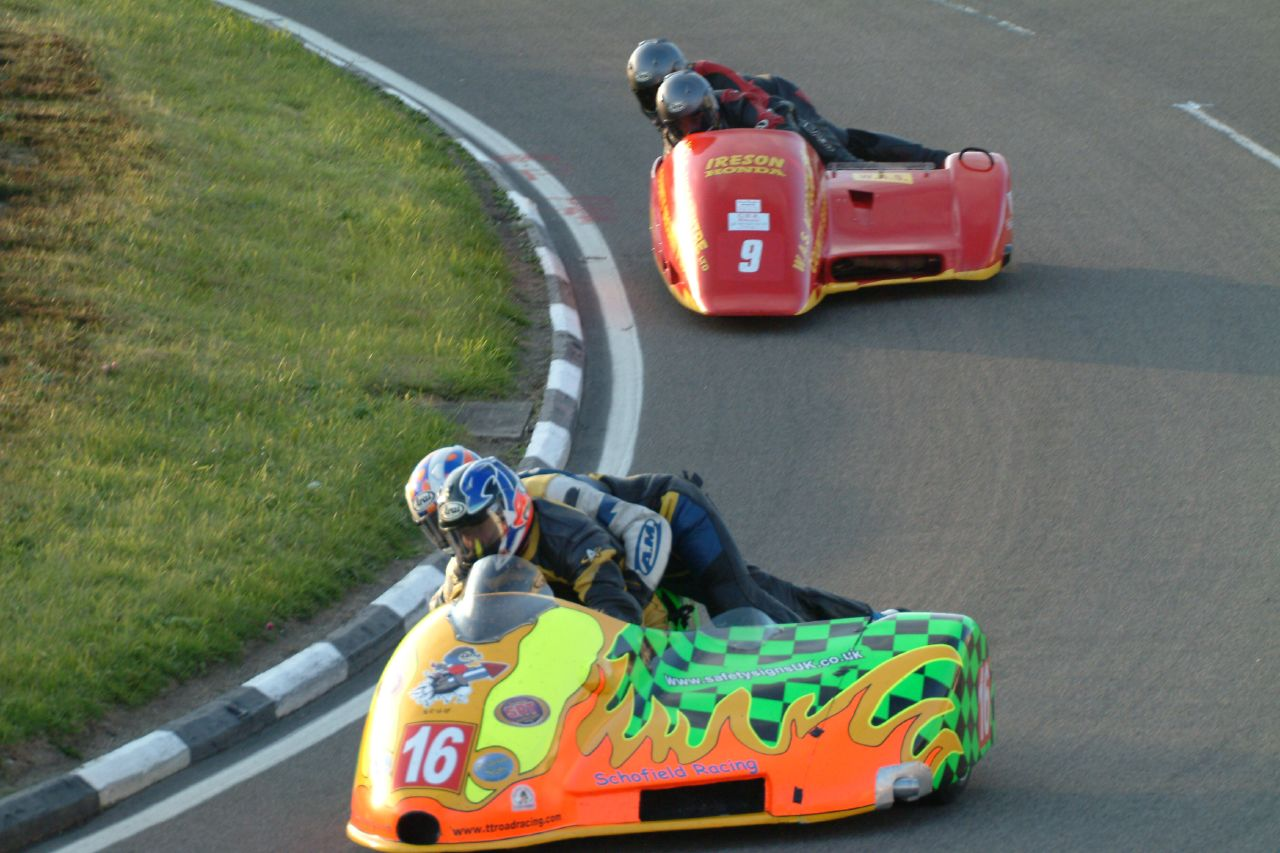
Racing sidecars at the Isle of Man TT

Sidecar racing events exist in motocross (see sidecarcross), enduro, grasstrack, trial, road racing and speedway with sidecar classes. The sport has followers in Europe, the United States, Japan, Australia and New Zealand. The sidecars are often classed by age or engine size, with historic sidecar racing often being more popular than its modern counterpart. Older classes in road racing generally resemble solo motorcycles with a platform attached, where modern racing sidecars are low and long and borrow much technology from open wheel race cars. In all types of sidecar racing there is a rider and a passenger who work in unison to make the machine perform, as they would be almost unrideable without the passenger in the correct position.

Road racing sidecars began to change away from normal motorcycle development in the 1950s with them becoming lower and using smaller diameter wheels and they kept the enclosed "dustbin fairing" banned in solo competition in 1957. By the 1970s, they were using wide slick tyres with a square car-like profile, the rider kneeled behind the engine instead of sitting on a seat and the motor of choice was generally a 500 cc two stroke. In the late 1970s sidecars began to appear with hub centre steering and later the engines moved to the rear of the rider, to lower the centre of gravity further still, making the sidecar very long. Sidecars raced in the Sidecar World Championship are all hub centre long monocoque framed machines, the most common being LCR, ART or Windle, with 1,000 cc four-cylinder four-stroke engines, the most popular being the Suzuki GSX-R1000.

These at club and national level are known as Formula One sidecars, as opposed to Formula Two. Formula Two sidecars are short front engined bikes, which must have a frame made of steel tube and have leading link forks as monocoques and hub centre steering is banned. Engines are 350 cc two strokes or 600 cc four strokes. F2 sidecars are raced in their own championship but are often on track at the same time as the F1s, but competing for their own points. Since 1990 at the Isle of Man TT, the Sidecar TT has been solely contested by Formula Two sidecars as Formula Ones were deemed too fast, then lapping at 108 mph (174 km/h) average. By 2006 however, F2s were faster than this lapping at 116 mph (187 km/h).

== Military use ==
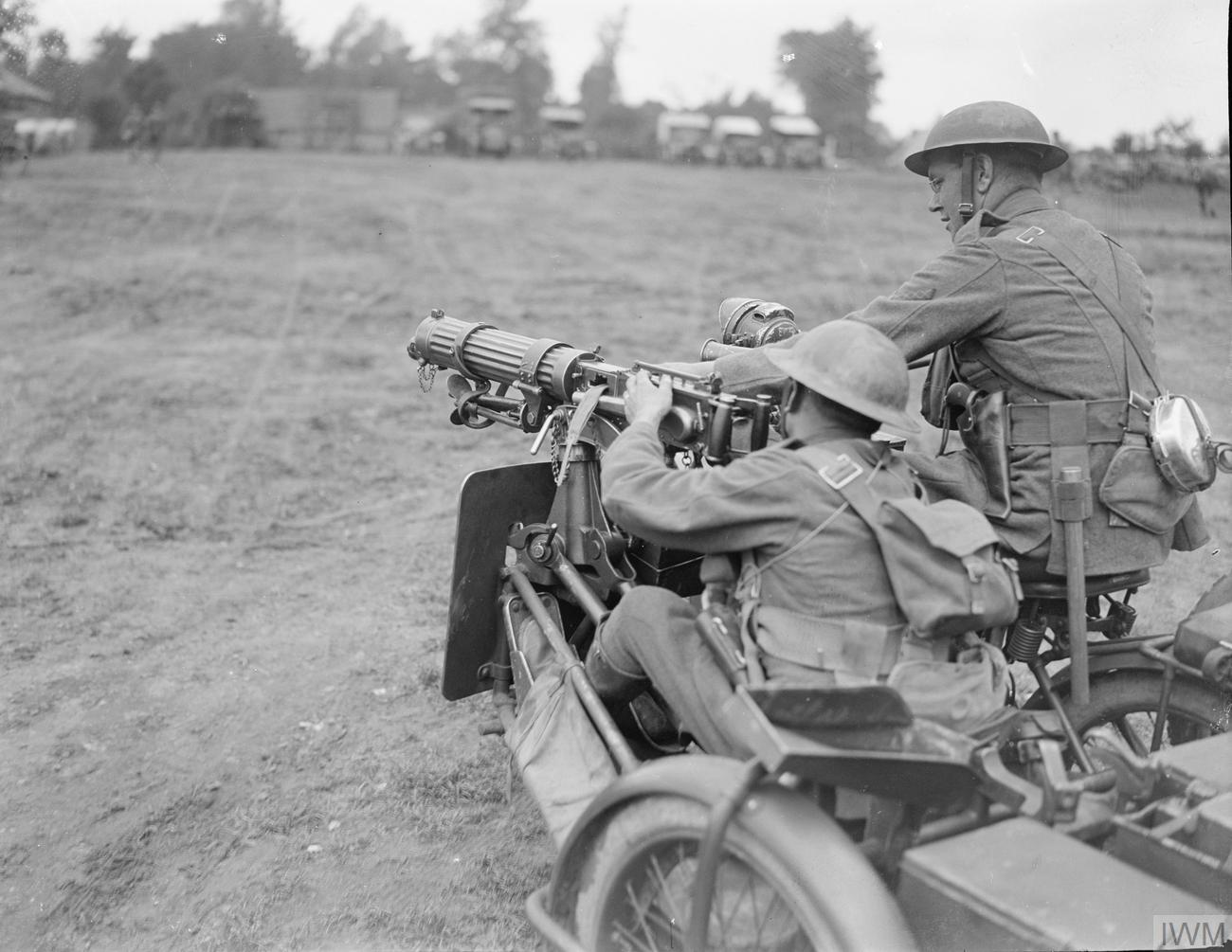
British soldiers of the Machine Gun Corps Motor Branch, with their Vickers-armed sidecar motorcycle, June 1918

During World War I, the British Army sought to increase the mobility of its Vickers machine guns. A gun and its tripod weighed between 29 and 36 kilograms (64 and 79 lb); cooling water was also required and ammunition boxes weighted a further 10 kilograms (22 lb) each; each gun required a six- to eight-man team to carry it.

A solution to this problem was to fit the guns to sidecar motorcycles. This would allow the guns to be moved rapidly between different sectors, and allow them to quickly pursue retreating enemy troops. Clyno motorcycles were initially adopted; these could carry the gun, tripod, water and spare parts, as well as seven ammunition boxes; they were supported by unarmed sidecar motorcycles that carried only ammunition. A number of different motorcycles were eventually used. A special unit, the Motor Machine Gun Service, was formed to operate them, but the static nature of trench warfare meant the unit was infrequently used.

During World War II, German troops used many BMW and Zündapp sidecar motorcycles. On German, Italian, French, Belgian, British and Soviet military sidecars, the side wheel was sometimes also driven, sometimes using a differential gear, to improve the vehicle's all-terrain ability.

== Regulation ==
The sidecar is normally fitted to the right of the motorcycle in jurisdictions where traffic keeps to the right side of the road; the sidecar's position is reversed in left-side jurisdictions. This matches the usual configuration of driver and front-seat passenger in cars. In the UK, sidecars fitted to the right side are prohibited on motorcycles registered after August 1981. In Italy, left-mounted sidecars were prohibited in 1924, though the ban was not enforced until 1959.

In the Republic of China (Taiwan), Article 39-2 of the Road Traffic Security Rules prohibits the registration of new motorcycles with sidecars but does not specifically restrict fitting them later.

== Flexible sidecars ==
Several flexible sidecars, not rigidly attached to the motorcycle, have been developed. This can help deal with issues of uneven pavement and allow leaning the bike into turns.

== Bicycle sidecars ==
Sidecars have sometimes been fitted on bicycles. The "Watsonian" brand was popular from the 1930s to the 1950s in the UK. The Philippine trisikad is a type in current use.

== Manufacturers ==
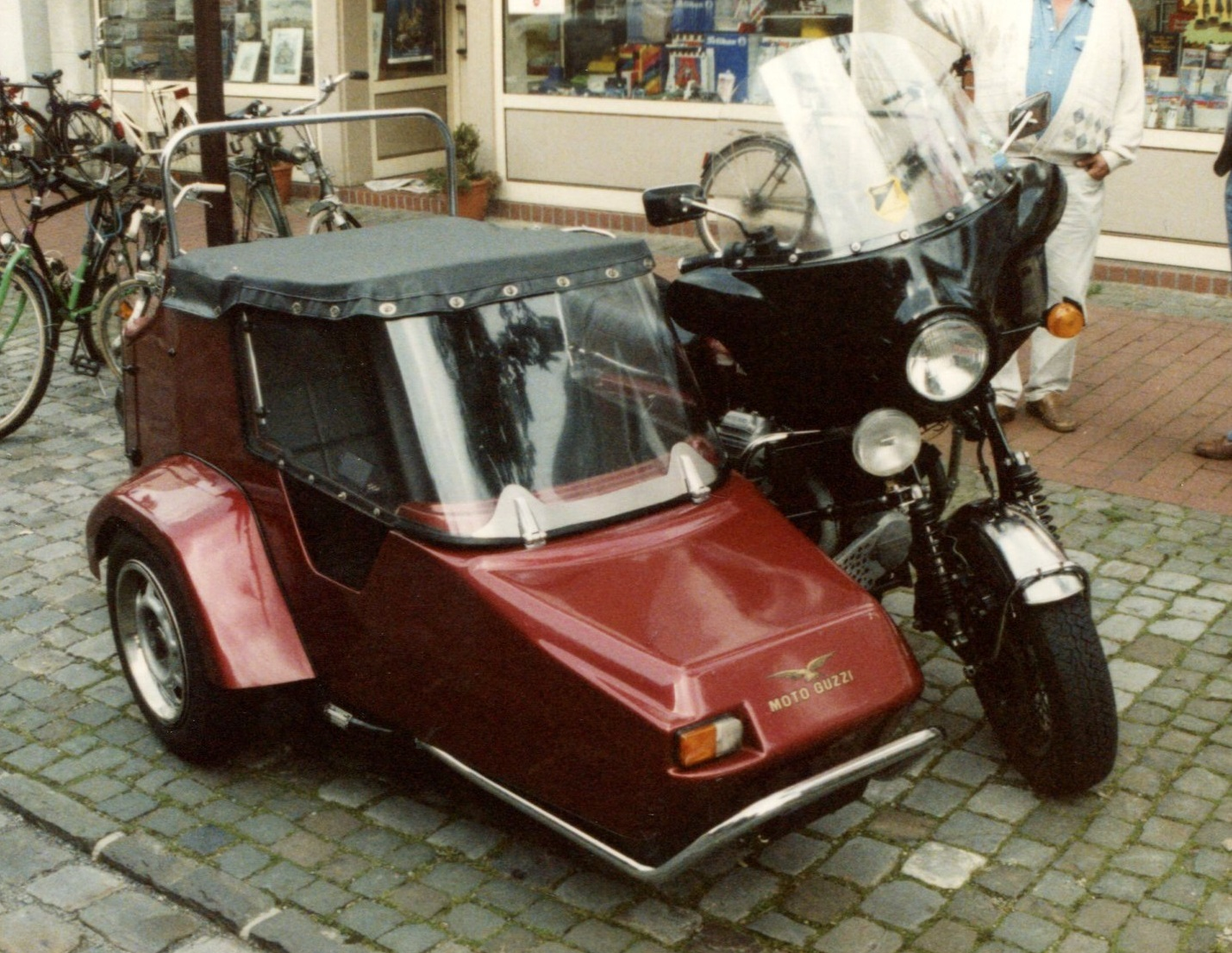
Sidecar with enclosed cabin

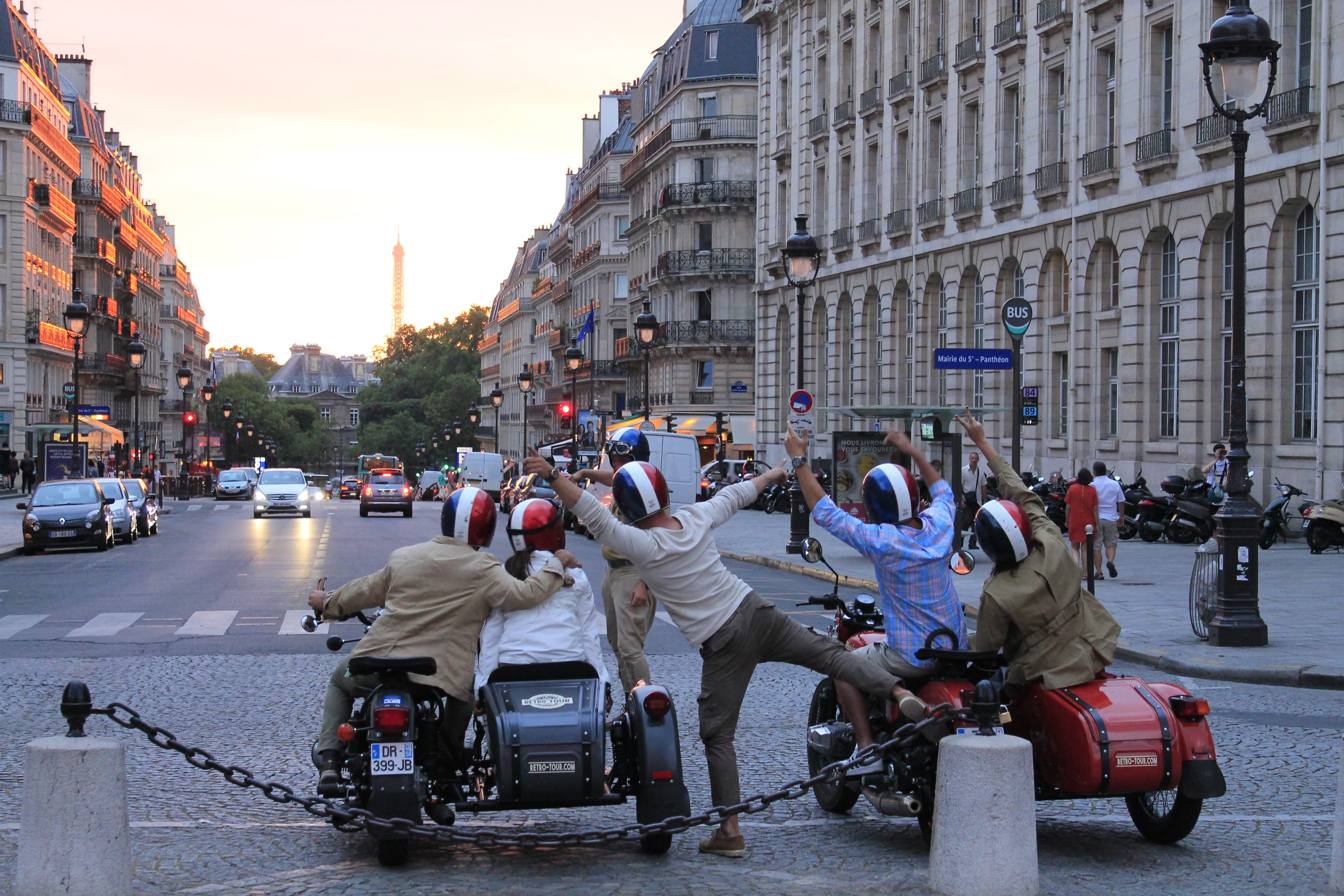
Tourists on a motorcycle sidecar tour of Paris pose for a photograph

Although sidecars have become much less common since the mid-1950s, a number of manufacturers worldwide have continued to produce sidecars for many popular motorcycles and scooters.

Active sidecar manufacturing companies include
Manufacturer	Country
Inder Exports	India
Inder Auto industries	India
Cozy	India
Divjot exports	India
EML Sidecars	Netherlands
Hongdu, Shineray and Zhuzhou	China
Watsonian Squire	UK (England)
IMZ-Ural and VMZ for IZh	Russia
Premier	Australia
Louis Christen Racing	Switzerland
Wasp Motorcycles	UK (England)
QD-Mobiles Oy	Finland
Motorvation Sidecars and Trailers	USA (Sibley, IA)
Agam India	India

== See also ==
- Cossack motorcycle
- Outline of cycling
- Motorcycle ambulance
- Riders for Health a charity which provides the "Uhuru", a sidecar ambulance, to communities in Africa
- Outline of motorcycles and motorcycling
- Tricar
- Tilting three-wheeler
- Motorized tricycle (Philippines)
