= Motorcycle trailer =

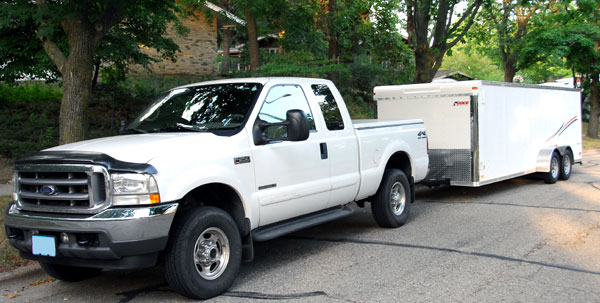
This motorcycle-specific trailer was built low enough so as not to increase wind resistance substantially.

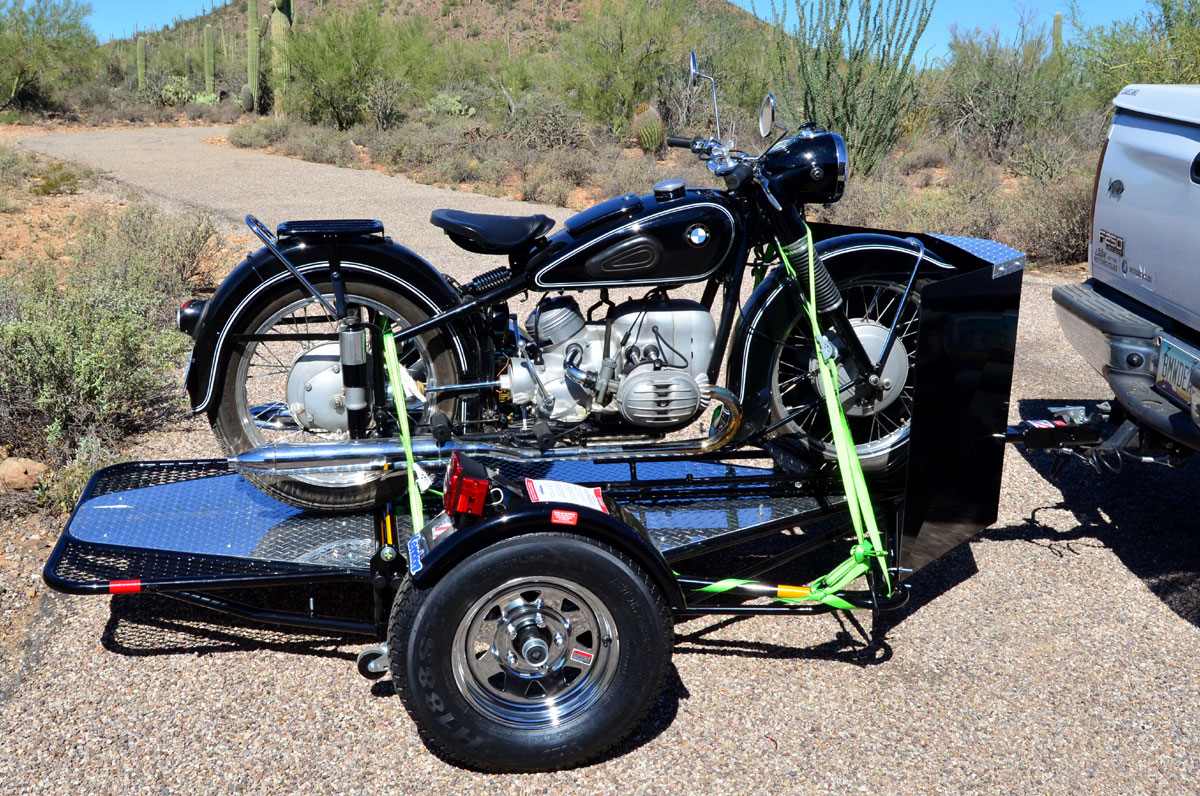
An open trailer designed specifically for carrying a motorcycle -- with a 1954 BMW R67/3

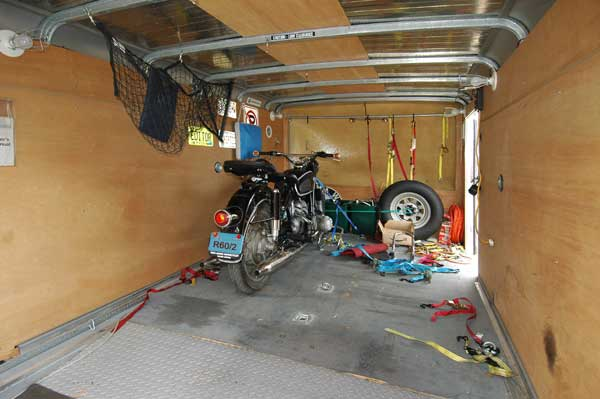
Interior of a 12-foot Wells Cargo enclosed motorcycle trailer.

A motorcycle trailer is either a trailer used to carry motorcycles or one to be pulled by a motorcycle in order to carry additional gear.

== Motorcycle carrying trailers ==
Motorcycle carrying trailers may be open or enclosed. They may be wide, for two machines side-by-side, or narrow, for just a single machine. The main features that distinguish them from other flatbed or enclosed trailers are track(s) to keep the wheels from sliding side to side and sufficient tiedown points to keep the motorcycle(s) from tipping. They may also tilt, or include ramp(s) to facilitate the loading and unloading of motorcycles. Trailer manufacturers often offer trailers specifically designed for carrying motorcycles.

General purpose enclosed trailers, as seen in the photo above left, have the advantage of providing a more secure way of locking up the motorcycles contained within it, keeping them out of sight, and protecting them from all kinds of weather. However, as they are heavier than open trailers and create more wind resistance, pulling a general purpose enclosed trailer can decrease the fuel efficiency of the tow vehicle. Conversely, an enclosed motorcycle-specific trailer can be built low enough so that wind resistance is reduced. As a result, fuel efficiency is better than towing a general purpose enclosed trailer.

Collapsible or folding motorcycle trailers are available to overcome storage problems that might prevent use of a non-collapsible trailer, some such trailers are sufficiently compact to allow the user to carry the trailer in the trunk of a car when not in use.

=== Types ===
The basic motorcycle trailer design consists of a fixed platform mounted above one or more axles, which requires the motorcycle be loaded by physically lifting it or rolling it up a ramp onto the platform, potentially a difficult problem when dealing with a heavy touring machine or one that has been disabled. Since the latter half of the 20th century a number of different trailer styles have been devised to make loading motorcycles on them easier. Broadly, such designs include:

- Tilt-bed, wherein the platform teeters on the axle, bringing the tail of the trailer to ground level. The motorcycle is pushed or ridden onto the trailer bed, which in some designs automatically tilts back to the horizontal and locks in place when the load moves forward of the bed pivot point. Such designs still require the machine be pushed up an inclined plane.
- Drop-bed, wherein the platform is lowered to the ground in a substantially horizontally fashion and the motorcycle has only to be rolled or ridden over the lip of the platform and secured to it, whereupon the entire platform and load are raised and secured for towing. Such designs only require the machine be raised by the thickness of the platform, which is typically less than 10 cm (4 in). Numerous mechanical designs have been devised by trailer fabricators to achieve this goal.

== Trailers pulled behind motorcycles ==
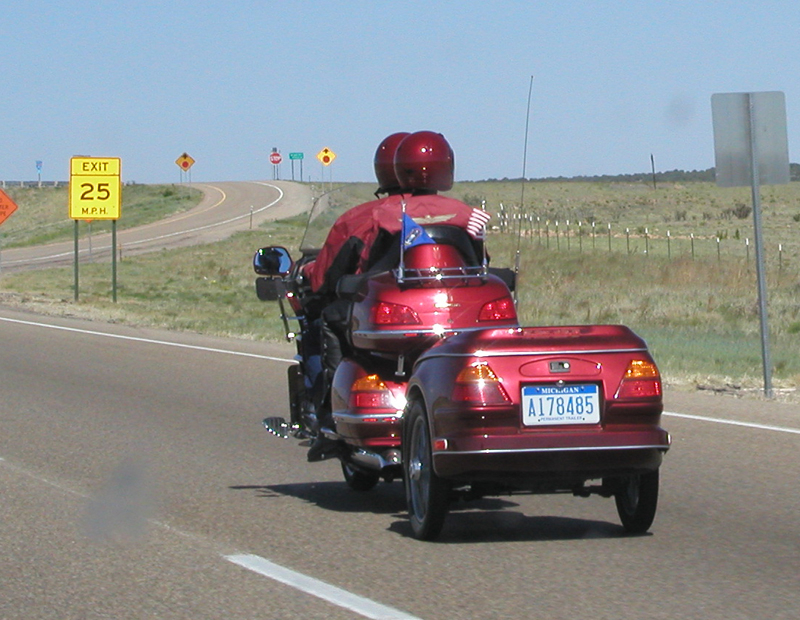
A Honda Goldwing towing a trailer

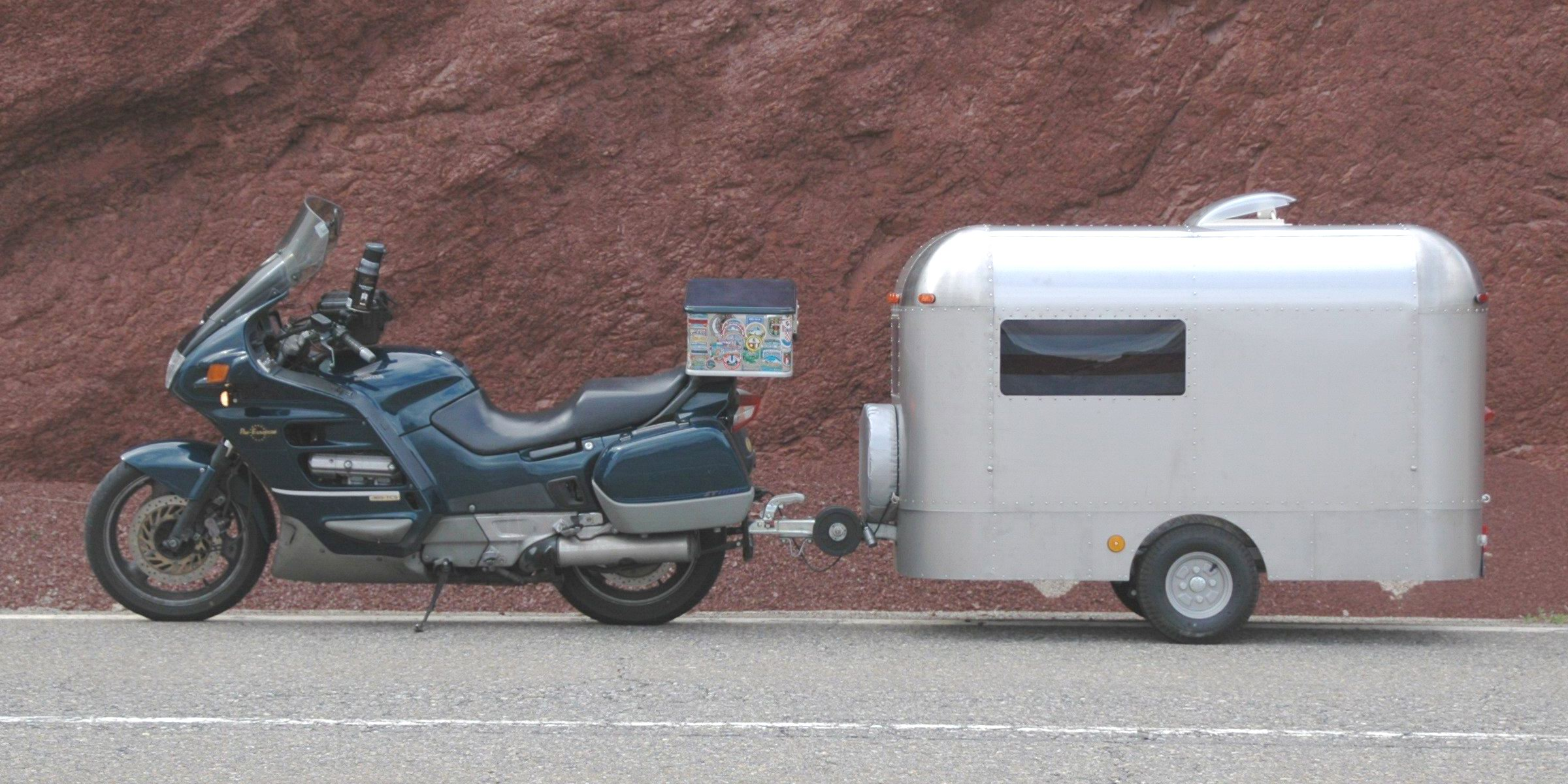
A Honda ST 1100 towing a caravan

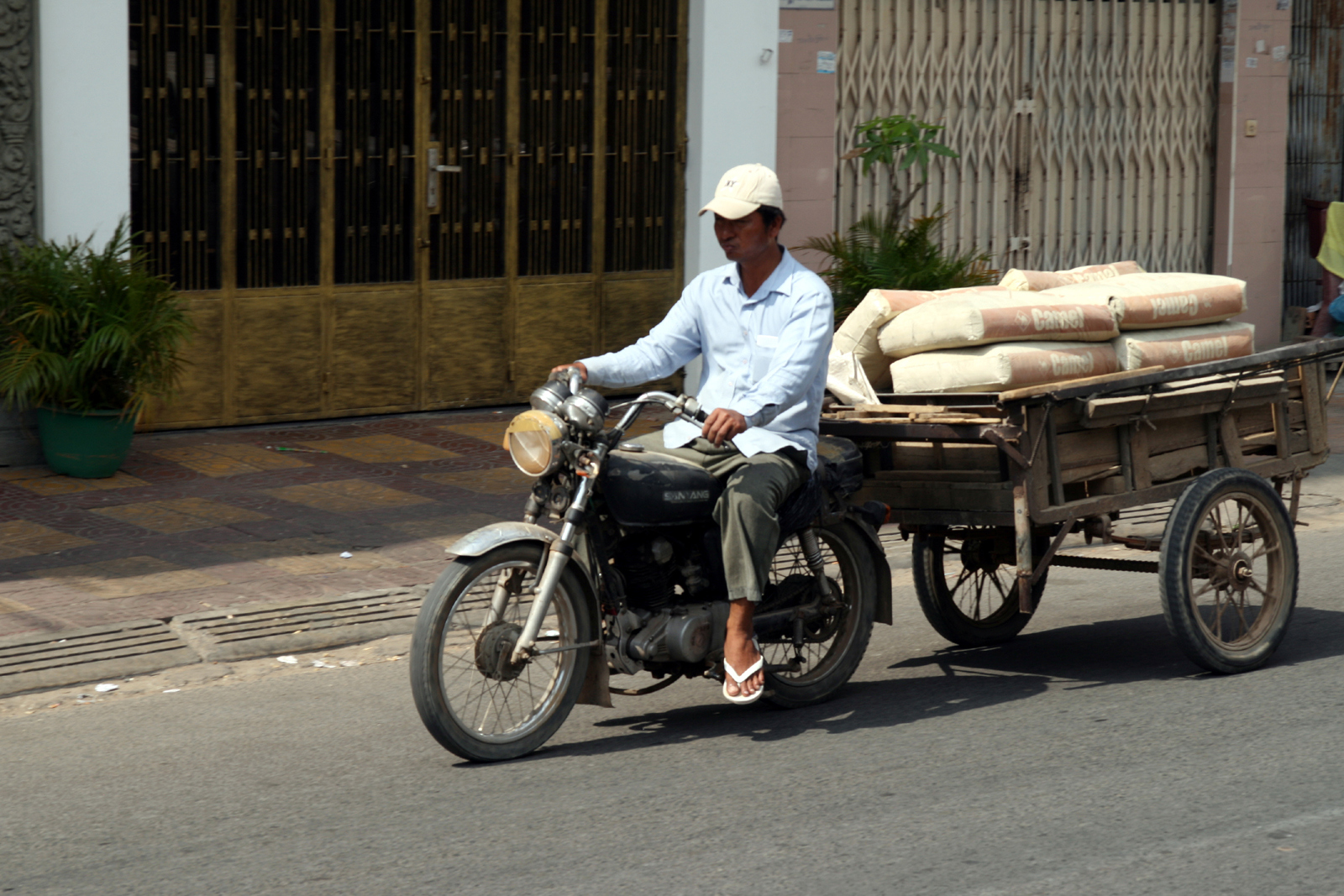
Motorcycle trailer in Cambodia

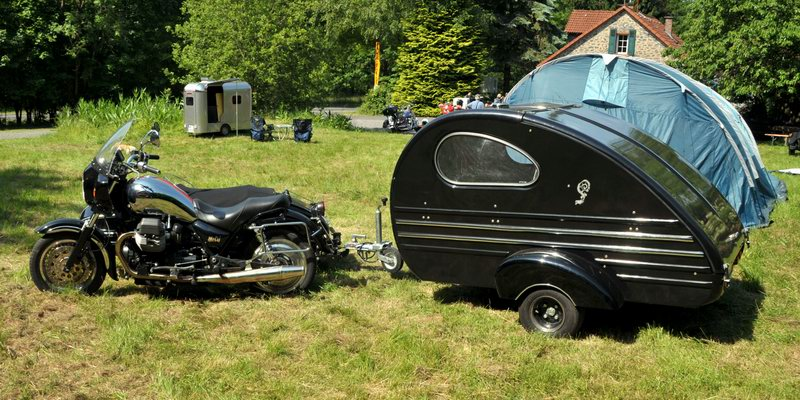
Teardrop trailer in Germany

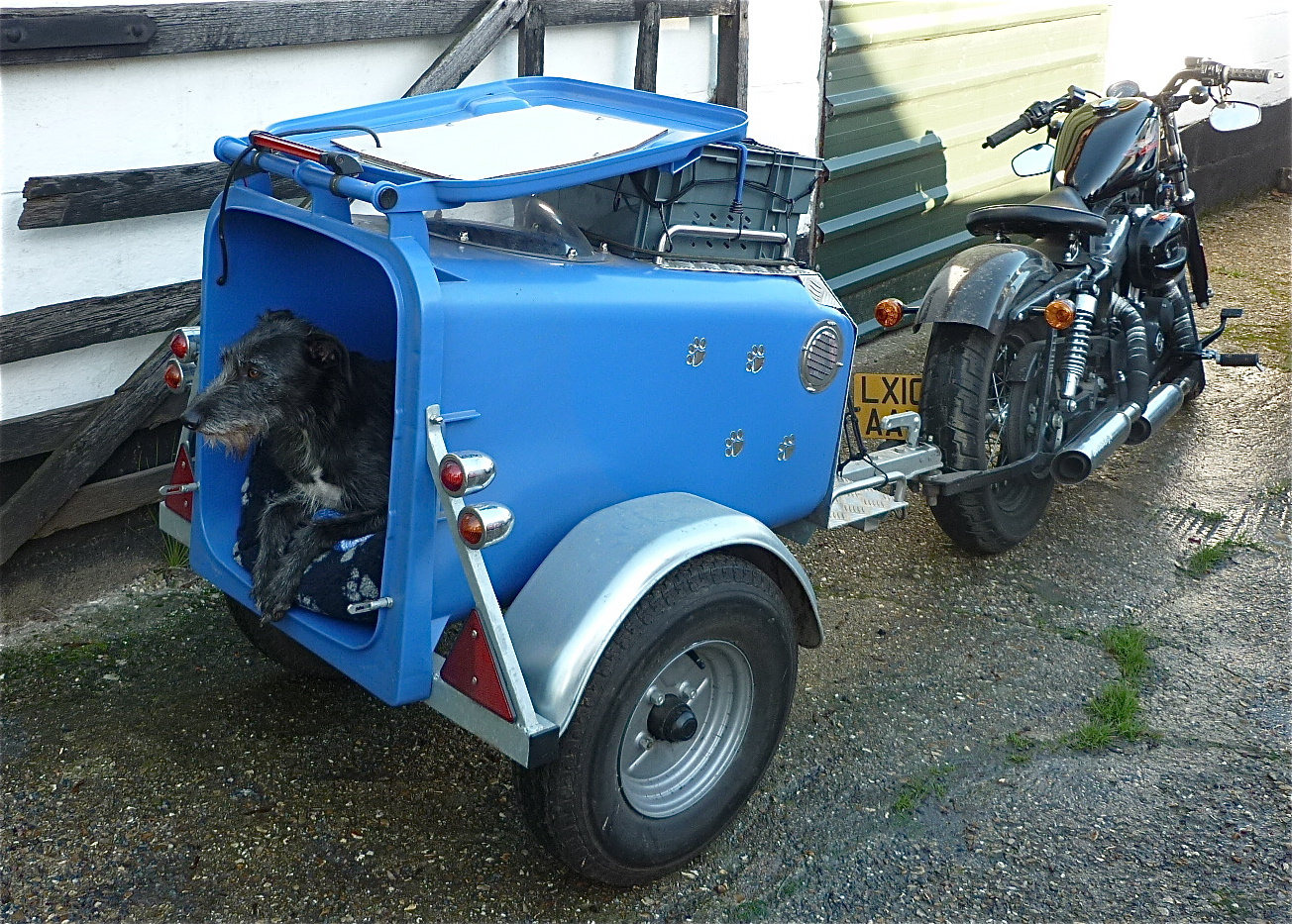
Motorcycle dog trailer

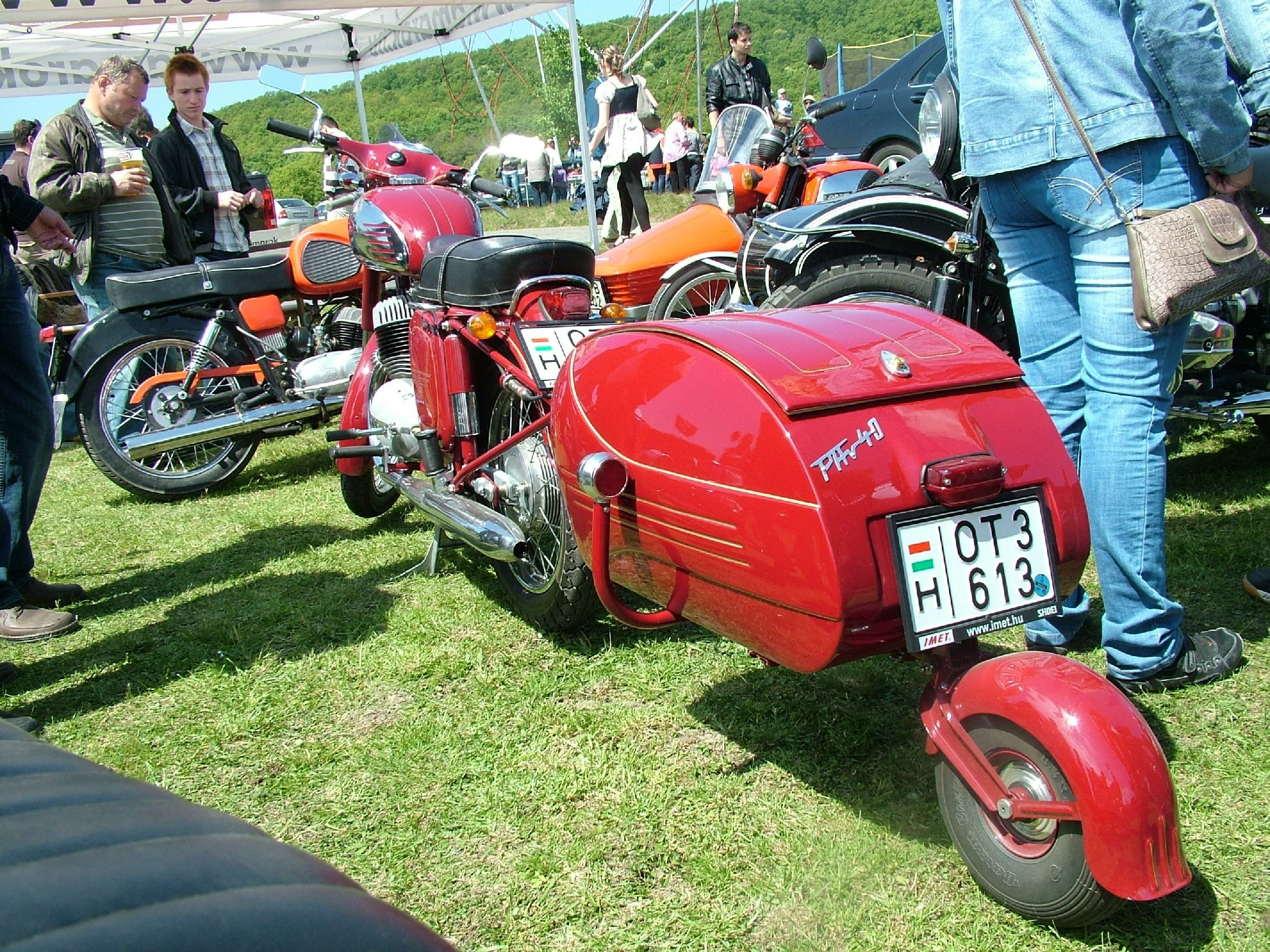
PAV trailer in Hungary

Trailers towed behind motorcycles are distinguished by their relatively small size, especially narrow wheelbase. They are also often styled to match the look of the motorcycle they are intended to be towed behind. This styling can include the overall shape, fender shape, lights, chrome, etc.

=== Types ===
==== Cargo trailers ====
Cargo trailers provide extra storage space on for bikers whose motorcycles have little storage. The most popular models are made of fibreglass or aluminium and ride on two wheels.

==== Open or utility trailer ====
Motorcycle utility trailers are uncovered, single-axle, flatbed trailers. These trailers are designed to be towed by a motorcycle, so they are much smaller than standard open trailers which must be towed by a four-wheel vehicle.

==== Dog trailer ====
Motorcycle dog trailers are designed to transport the animals in safety and comfort. They are fully enclosed, well ventilated and have suspension.

==== Motorcycle camping trailers ====
Two types of trailers prevail within the motorcycle camping trailers category: clamshell and platform camper trailers. Fabric material is attached to the top and bottom halves of the clamshell trailer. The tent is created when the trailer is opened. Once a platform camping trailer is opened, however, the tent is pitched on it. These platform style camping trailers are larger than clamshell camping trailers and can fit full-sized to king-sized air mattresses. Most often, clamshells can only accommodate a single occupant.

==== The Pav 40/41/100 ====
The Pav trailers were manufactured in the Czech Republic, originally by "AVIA n.p". and later by "KOVOZAVODY SEMILY" by Jawa Moto. Earliest examples were made in the mid- to late-1950s, which pre-date the PAV 40. The PAV 40 debuted in approximately 1958 or 1959. The PAV 41 eventually replaced the PAV 40 and was produced into the 1970s. Pav trailers feature a single 4-inch (102 mm) wheel and are rated to 80 km/h (50 mph). They were made to be attached to Jawa motorcycles, although they make excellent accessories for Vespa, Lambretta, Cezeta, Heinkel, Fuji, Zundapp, Cushman, or any other vintage motorcycle, scooter or microcar (like Isetta or Messerschmitt). Having just one wheel, these trailers are attached to the towing vehicle by a hitch that has only two degrees of freedom — pitch and yaw.

== Hitching a trailer to a motorcycle ==
In order to tow a trailer behind a motorcycle, one of the following coupling combinations or mechanisms is needed: a ball and socket, swivel adapter, or pivot ball hitch and coupler.

=== Ball and socket ===
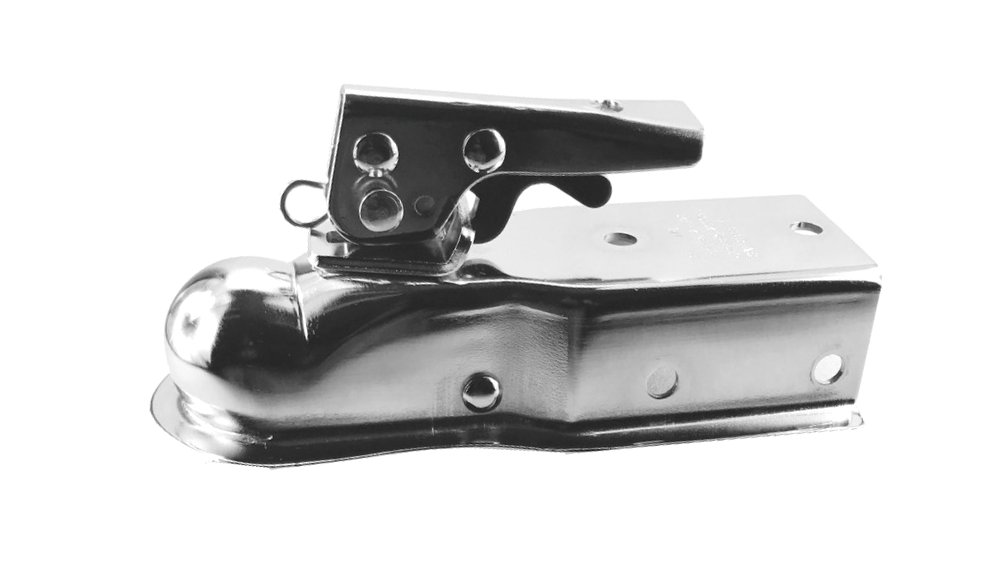
Ball and Socket Coupler

Most trailers are towed by joining a ball and a coupler (socket). The coupler is attached to the trailer, and the ball hitch is attached to the tow vehicle. The coupler slides over the ball hitch. Then, pressure is applied to a clamp, usually with a toggle or lever, which secures the ball in the coupler. When properly attached, the coupler will have limited movement, swiveling mainly right and left as well as tilting slightly.

=== Swivel adapter (swivel coupler - swivel hitch) ===
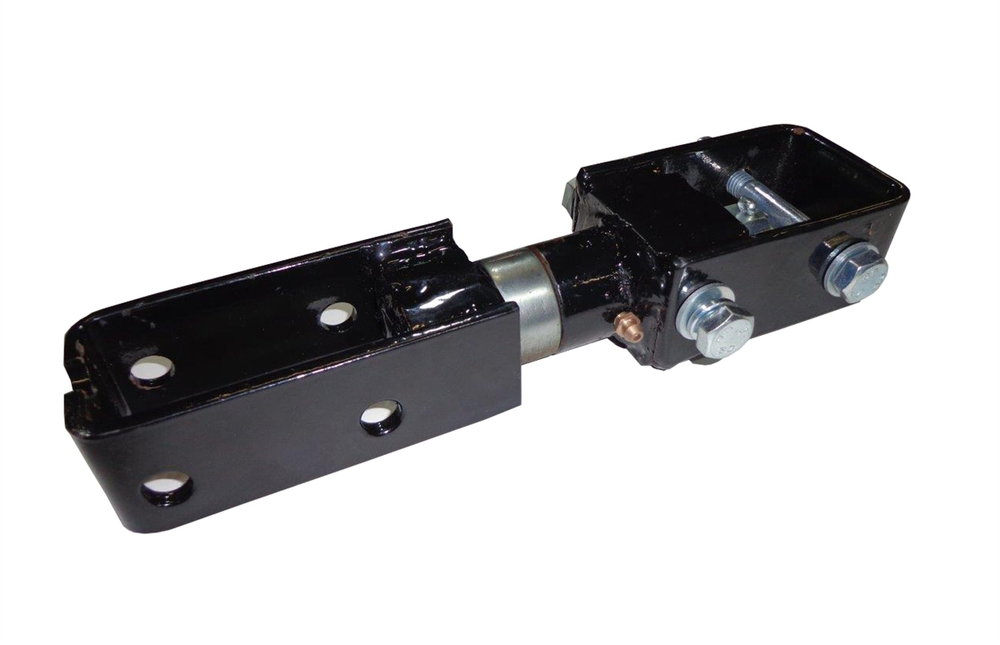
Underside view of a swivel adapter (swivel coupler - swivel hitch)

The swivel adapter, more commonly referred to as a swivel coupler or swivel hitch, functions by connecting one end to the trailer tongue and the other end directly to the hitch on the tow vehicle or to a coupler. This mechanism is engineered to rotate on the vertical axis so as to eliminate the possibility of coupler binding. As a result, the motorcyclist is able to lean into a turn as far as necessary at high speeds while keeping the trailer upright.

=== Anti-binding motorcycle trailer hitch assembly (pivot ball hitch) ===
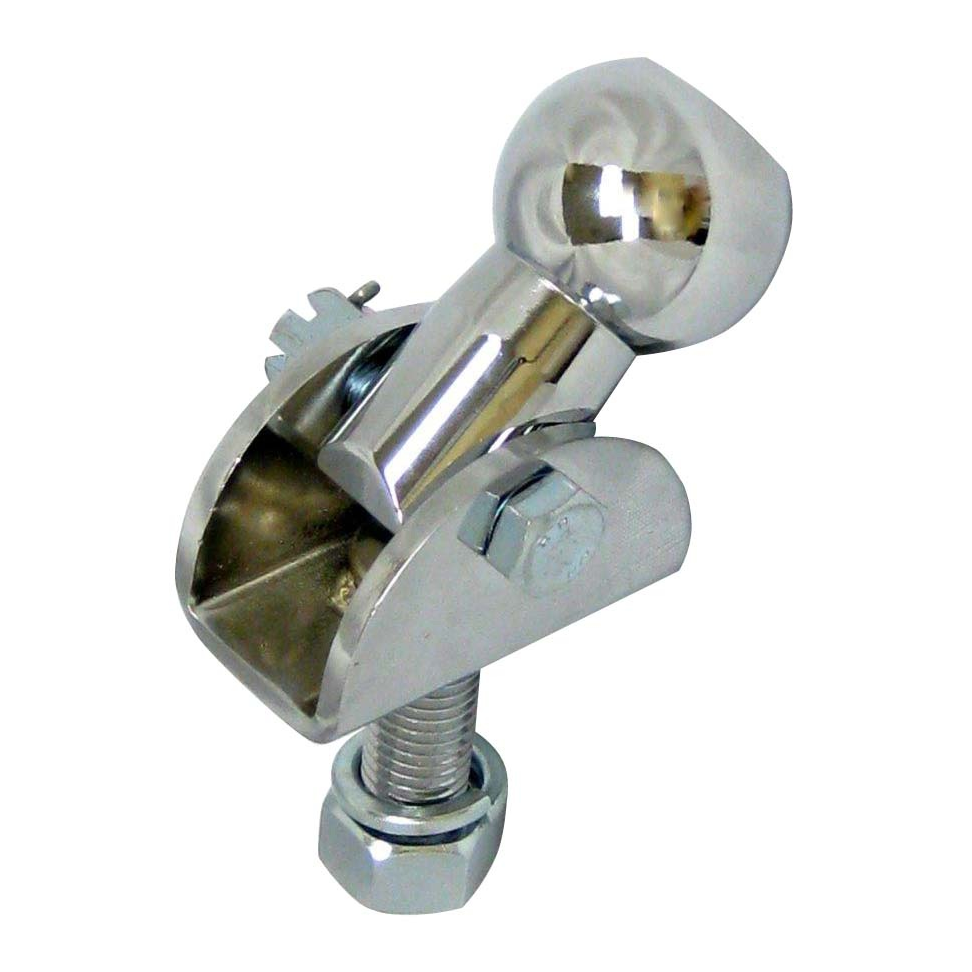
Anti-binding motorcycle trailer hitch assembly (pivot ball hitch)

The pivot ball hitch is an anti-binding motorcycle trailer hitch assembly composed of a base and a trailer ball. The base is secured to a standard ball mount on the motorcycle. The trailer is attached to a socket coupler. A space between the ball shank and the assembly mount allow the ball to move left and right in a vertical plane. Thus, the ball remains in a generally upright position when the motorcycle leans left or right into a turn because the base of the pivot ball hitch is able to move in the opposite direction of the motorcycle without causing the coupler to bind.

=== Coupler binding ===
Making a turn on a single-track vehicle such as a two-wheeled motorcycle requires the driver to lean the bike. The amount of the lean is dependent upon the speed. Faster speeds require more leaning than slower speeds do. When making a turn with a trailer attached, the mechanism that joins the trailer to the motorcycle must allow for an appreciable lean in order for a trailer to stay upright. Without the ability to freely rotate on a vertical axis, the coupler will bind and the trailer will jack-knife or flip.

As explained above in "Ball and socket", the movement in the coupler and ball combination is limited to mostly horizontal movement and tilting slightly. Therefore, this type of coupling is best suited for three-wheeled motorcycles and four-wheeled vehicles. In contrast, as pivot ball hitches and swivel adapters do allow the appreciable lean necessary to keep all the trailer wheels on the ground while turning, these devices are the better option for towing trailers behind a two-wheeled motorcycle. However, the standard car type "ball and socket" couplings used in the United Kingdom are perfectly adequate for two wheeled motorcycles providing plenty of lean angle.

=== Towing restrictions in the United Kingdom ===
In the United Kingdom, there are some legal restrictions on towing trailers.

- Only motorcycles with engine displacement over 125 cm^{3} (7.6 cu in) may tow.
- The motorcycle must be marked with its kerbside weight.
- The trailer must not be wider than 1 m (3 ft 3 in).
- The distance between the rear axle of the motorcycle and the rear-most part of the trailer must not exceed 2.5 metres (8 ft 2 in).
- The laden weight of the trailer must not exceed 150 kg (331 lb) or two-thirds of the kerbside weight of the motorcycle, whichever is lighter.
- The trailer must be clearly and indelibly marked with its unladen weight.
- The UK speed limit is 60 mph on motorways and dual carriageways and 50 mph on all other roads unless a lesser limit is in force.
- The trailer must display the same registration plate as the towing vehicle.
- Trailers must have two red sidelights, two red stop lights, a number plate light, two triangular red reflectors and amber indicators (which flash between 60 and 120 times per minute) at the rear.
- All trailers built after September 30, 1990 also require white front reflectors.

=== Safety ===
Tips for towing include:

- Motorcycle manufacturers do not recommend that trailers be towed by their motorcycles because of the increased safety hazards. All towing is done at the operator's own risk.
- A ball hitch, where used, should be well greased at all times to facilitate smooth cornering.
- While towing a trailer, one must remember to ride closer to the centre of the lane, taking the width of trailer into account. Be careful of the "oil strip" in the centre of the lane at intersections, especially when it begins to rain after an extended dry spell. Also, watch for uneven road surfaces and road edges that can unbalance the trailer.
- Keep enough of the weight forward of the axle to maintain a positive hitch load when loading the trailer.

== World records ==
The Guinness World Record for a motorcycle and trailer is 139.5 mph, set in 2002 by Motor Cycle News (UK) towing a Squire D21 trailer behind a Kawasaki ZZ-R1100.
