= Steib Metallbau =

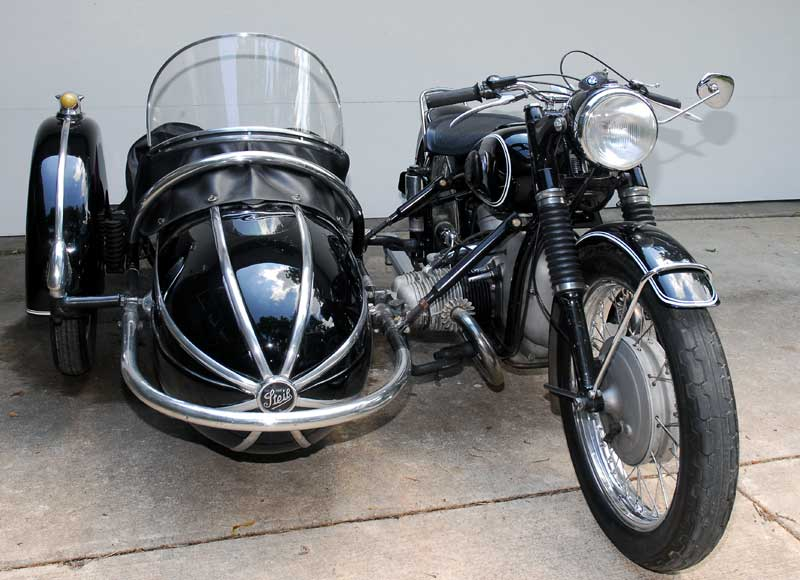
- A 1954 BMW R68 motorcycle with a 1951 Steib Type S 501 sidecar
- Trade name: Josef Steib Spezialfabrik für Seitenwagen
- Company type: Private company
- Industry: Automotive industry
- Founded: 1914
- Founder: Josef Steib Senior
- Defunct: 1957
- Fate: Closed
- Headquarters: Nuremberg, Germany
- Products: Motorcycle sidecars

Steib Metallbau, later trading as Josef Steib Spezialfabrik für Seitenwagen, was a German company based in Nuremberg that manufactured sidecars. The company was founded in 1914 by Josef Steib Senior and began making sidecars in 1928 following a commission from the motorcycle manufacturer Ardie. The company closed in 1957.

The product range included a variety of designs with the LS 200 for motorcycles up to 200 cc (12 cu in), the LS. 350 for motorcycles of 250 cc (15 cu in) to 350 cc (21 cu in) and the S 500 L and TR-500 for motorcycles above 500 cc (31 cu in)amongst the most common. Replica outfits remain in production today.

== History ==
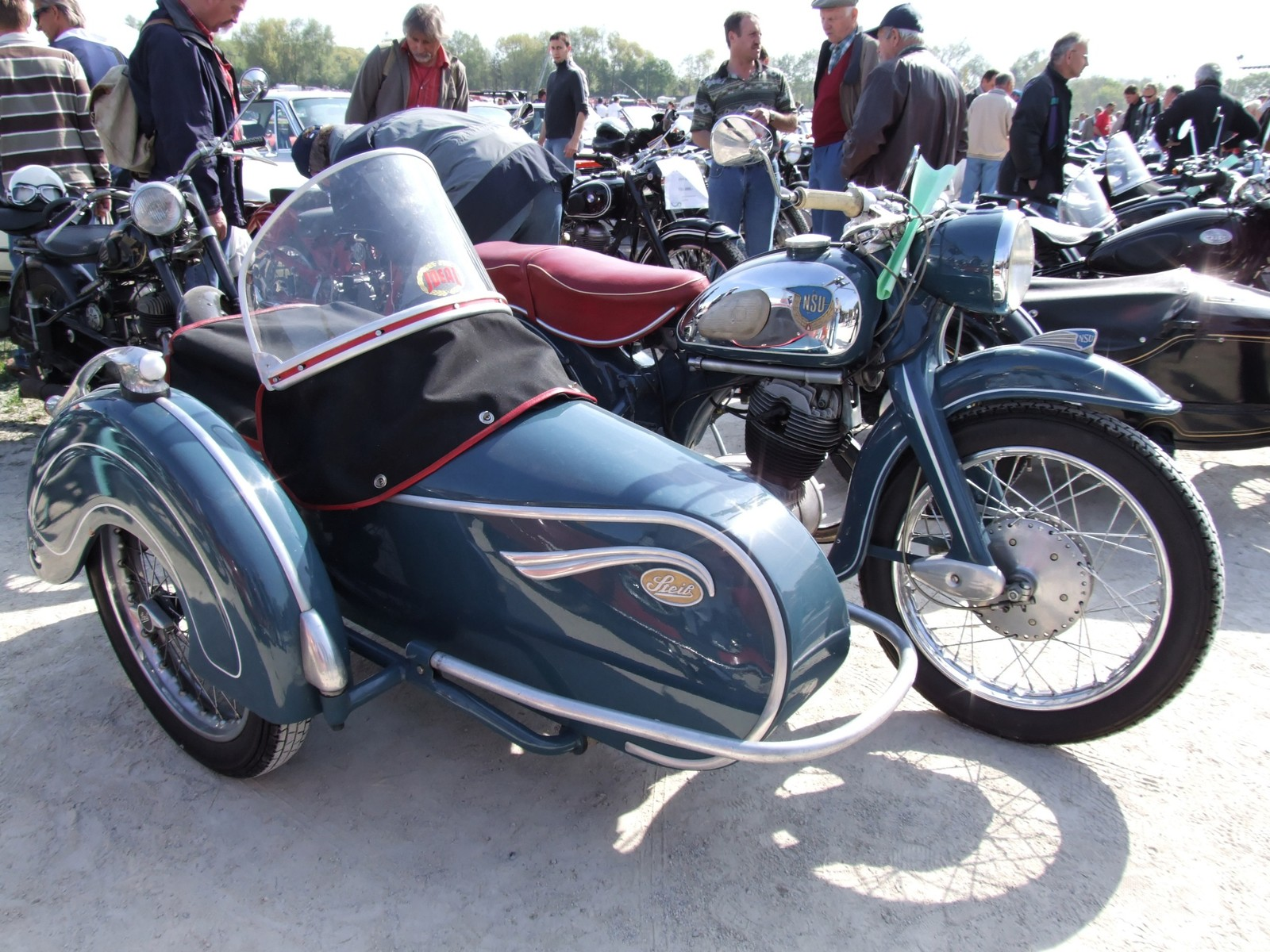
A 1950s NSU Max motorcycle with a Steib Type LS 200 sidecar

The firm was founded in 1914 by Josef Steib Senior.

The company reached its peak in the 1950s when it claimed to manufacture 92% of all sidecars sold in Germany and the sidecars were the standard model offered with BMW motorcycles.
