= Gioele Pellino =

Italian motorcycle racer

- Nationality: Italian
- Born: 13 August 1983 (age 43); Foligno, Italy

Gioele Pellino is a Grand Prix motorcycle racer from Italy.

== Career statistics ==
=== By season ===
Season	Class	Motorcycle	Team	Number	Race	Win	Podium	Pole	FLap	Pts	Plcd
2002	125cc	Aprilia	Team Gabrielli	53	2	0	0	0	0	2	35th
2003	125cc	Aprilia	Sterilgarda Racing	42	16	0	0	0	0	25	23rd
2004	125cc	Aprilia	Abruzzo Racing Team	42	16	0	0	0	0	16	23rd
2005	125cc	Malaguti	Malaguti Reparto Corse	42	9	0	0	0	0	0	NC
2008	125cc	Loncin	Loncin Racing	61	1	0	0	0	0	0	NC
Total					**44**	**0**	**0**	**0**	**0**	**43**	

=== Races by year ===
(key) (Races in bold indicate pole position, races in italics indicate fastest lap)

Year	Class	Bike	1	2	3	4	5	6	7	8	9	10	11	12	13	14	15	16	17	Pos	Pts
2002	125cc	Aprilia	JPN	RSA	SPA	FRA	ITA; 14	CAT	NED	GBR	GER	CZE; 22	POR	BRA	PAC	MAL	AUS	VAL		35th	2
2003	125cc	Aprilia	JPN; 15	RSA; 16	SPA; 20	FRA; Ret	ITA; 10	CAT; 11	NED; Ret	GBR; 12	GER; 13	CZE; 9	POR; Ret	BRA; 26	PAC; Ret	MAL; Ret	AUS; Ret	VAL; Ret		23rd	25
2004	125cc	Aprilia	RSA; Ret	SPA; Ret	FRA; 17	ITA; Ret	CAT; 13	NED; 13	BRA; 16	GER; 13	GBR; 10	CZE; Ret	POR; Ret	JPN; 16	QAT; 15	MAL; Ret	AUS; 17	VAL; 20		23rd	16
2005	125cc	Malaguti	SPA	POR	CHN	FRA; 17	ITA; 20	CAT; 28	NED; 21	GBR; 18	GER	CZE	JPN	MAL	QAT; 23	AUS; 24	TUR; 23	VAL; 22		NC	0
2008	125cc	Loncin	QAT	SPA	POR	CHN	FRA; Ret	ITA	CAT	GBR	NED	GER	CZE	RSM	INP	JPN	AUS	MAL	VAL	NC	0

=== CIV 125cc Championship ===
==== Races by year ====
(key) (Races in bold indicate pole position; races in italics indicate fastest lap)

Year	Bike	1	2	3	4	5	Pos	Pts
2001	Honda	MIS1; 3	MON; 5	VAL; 1	MIS2; 2	MIS3; 3	1st	77

=== CIV Championship (Campionato Italiano Velocita) ===
==== Races by year ====
(key) (Races in bold indicate pole position; races in italics indicate fastest lap)

Year	Class	Bike	1	2	3	4	5	Pos	Pts
2002	125cc	Aprilia	IMO; 2	VAL; 2	MUG; 2	MIS1; 1	**MIS2**; Ret	2nd	85
