= Rio de Janeiro motorcycle Grand Prix =

History of the Rio de Janeiro motorcycle Grand Prix

Rio de Janeiro Grand Prix

Grand Prix motorcycle racing
- Venue: Jacarepaguá (1995–2004)
- First race: 1995
- Last race: 2004
- Most wins (rider): Valentino Rossi (6)
- Most wins (manufacturer): Honda (15)

The Rio de Janeiro motorcycle Grand Prix was a motorcycling event that was part of the Grand Prix motorcycle racing season from 1995 to 2004.

== Official names and sponsors ==
- 1995, 1997: Lucky Strike Rio Grand Prix
- 1996: GP Rio (no official sponsor)
- 1999: Telefônica Celular Rio Grand Prix
- 2000–2004: Cinzano Rio Grand Prix

== Winners ==
=== Multiple winners (riders) ===
# Wins	Rider	Wins	
# Wins	Rider	Category	Years won
6	(Italy) Valentino Rossi	MotoGP	2002, 2003
6	(Italy) Valentino Rossi	500cc	2000, 2001
6	(Italy) Valentino Rossi	250cc	1999
6	(Italy) Valentino Rossi	125cc	1997
2	(Australia) Mick Doohan	500cc	1996, 1997
2	(France) Olivier Jacque	250cc	1996, 1997
2	(Japan) Daijiro Kato	250cc	2000, 2001
2	(San Marino) Manuel Poggiali	250cc	2003, 2004

=== Multiple winners (manufacturers) ===
# Wins	Manufacturer	Wins	
# Wins	Manufacturer	Category	Years won
15	(Japan) Honda	MotoGP	2002, 2003, 2004
15	(Japan) Honda	500cc	1996, 1997, 2000, 2001
15	(Japan) Honda	250cc	1995, 1996, 1997, 2000, 2001
15	(Japan) Honda	125cc	1996, 1999, 2002
7	(Italy) Aprilia	250cc	1999, 2003, 2004
7	(Italy) Aprilia	125cc	1995, 1997, 2000, 2004
3	(Japan) Yamaha	500cc	1995, 1999
3	(Japan) Yamaha	250cc	2002
2	(Spain) Derbi	125cc	2001, 2003

=== By year ===
Year	Track	125cc		250cc		MotoGP		Report
Year	Track	Rider	Manufacturer	Rider	Manufacturer	Rider	Manufacturer	Report
2004	Jacarepaguá	(Spain) Héctor Barberá	Aprilia	(San Marino) Manuel Poggiali	Aprilia	(Japan) Makoto Tamada	Honda	Report
2003	Jacarepaguá	(Spain) Jorge Lorenzo	Derbi	(San Marino) Manuel Poggiali	Aprilia	(Italy) Valentino Rossi	Honda	Report
2002	Jacarepaguá	(Japan) Masao Azuma	Honda	(Argentina) Sebastian Porto	Yamaha	(Italy) Valentino Rossi	Honda	Report
Year	Track	125cc		250cc		500cc		Report
Year	Track	Rider	Manufacturer	Rider	Manufacturer	Rider	Manufacturer	Report
2001	Jacarepaguá	(Japan) Youichi Ui	Derbi	(Japan) Daijiro Kato	Honda	(Italy) Valentino Rossi	Honda	Report
2000	Jacarepaguá	(Italy) Simone Sanna	Aprilia	(Japan) Daijiro Kato	Honda	(Italy) Valentino Rossi	Honda	Report
1999	Jacarepaguá	(Japan) Noboru Ueda	Honda	(Italy) Valentino Rossi	Aprilia	(Japan) Norifumi Abe	Yamaha	Report
1997	Jacarepaguá	(Italy) Valentino Rossi	Aprilia	(France) Olivier Jacque	Honda	(Australia) Mick Doohan	Honda	Report
1996	Jacarepaguá	(Japan) Haruchika Aoki	Honda	(France) Olivier Jacque	Honda	(Australia) Mick Doohan	Honda	Report
1995	Jacarepaguá	(Japan) Masaki Tokudome	Aprilia	(Italy) Doriano Romboni	Honda	(Italy) Luca Cadalora	Yamaha	Report
