= 2002 Czech Republic motorcycle Grand Prix =

2002 Czech Republic Grand Prix
Race details
- Race 10 of 16 races in the 2002 Grand Prix motorcycle racing season
- Date: 25 August 2002
- Official name: Gauloises Grand Prix České republiky
- Location: Brno Circuit
- Course: Permanent racing facility; 5.403 km (3.357 mi)

MotoGP
Pole position
Rider	(Italy) Max Biaggi	Yamaha
Time	1:59.646	
Fastest lap
Rider	(Japan) Daijiro Kato	Honda
Time	2:00.605 on lap 3	
Podium
First	(Italy) Max Biaggi	Yamaha
Second	(Japan) Daijiro Kato	Honda
Third	(Japan) Tohru Ukawa	Honda

250cc
Pole position
Rider	(Spain) Fonsi Nieto	Aprilia
Time	2:03.037	
Fastest lap
Rider	(Italy) Marco Melandri	Aprilia
Time	2:04.039 on lap 19	
Podium
First	(Italy) Marco Melandri	Aprilia
Second	(Argentina) Sebastián Porto	Yamaha
Third	(Spain) Toni Elías	Aprilia

125cc
Pole position
Rider	(San Marino) Alex de Angelis	Aprilia
Time	2:08.746	
Fastest lap
Rider	(Italy) Lucio Cecchinello	Aprilia
Time	2:08.903 on lap 3	
Podium
First	(Italy) Lucio Cecchinello	Aprilia
Second	(Spain) Daniel Pedrosa	Honda
Third	(France) Arnaud Vincent	Aprilia

The 2002 Czech Republic motorcycle Grand Prix was the tenth round of the 2002 MotoGP Championship. It took place on the weekend of 23–25 August 2002 at the Brno Circuit located in Brno, Czech Republic. This event would be the last podium for Japanese MotoGP rider, Daijiro Kato; who finished in second place, before his death on 20 April 2003 following an accident at the 2003 Japanese Grand Prix.

== MotoGP classification ==
Pos.	No.	Rider	Team	Manufacturer	Laps	Time/Retired	Grid	Points
1	3	(Italy) Max Biaggi	Marlboro Yamaha Team	Yamaha	22	44:36.498	1	25
2	74	(Japan) Daijiro Kato	Fortuna Honda Gresini	Honda	22	+2.755	2	20
3	11	(Japan) Tohru Ukawa	Repsol Honda Team	Honda	22	+7.598	8	16
4	15	(Spain) Sete Gibernau	Telefónica Movistar Suzuki	Suzuki	22	+11.889	9	13
5	7	(Spain) Carlos Checa	Marlboro Yamaha Team	Yamaha	22	+14.029	6	11
6	65	(Italy) Loris Capirossi	West Honda Pons	Honda	22	+18.260	5	10
7	99	(United Kingdom) Jeremy McWilliams	Proton Team KR	Proton KR	22	+24.840	12	9
8	6	(Japan) Norifumi Abe	Antena 3 Yamaha d'Antín	Yamaha	22	+26.572	16	8
9	4	(Brazil) Alex Barros	West Honda Pons	Honda	22	+28.741	10	7
10	19	(France) Olivier Jacque	Gauloises Yamaha Tech 3	Yamaha	22	+29.156	15	6
11	10	(United States) Kenny Roberts Jr.	Telefónica Movistar Suzuki	Suzuki	22	+32.920	19	5
12	17	(Netherlands) Jurgen van den Goorbergh	Kanemoto Racing	Honda	22	+38.670	13	4
13	8	(Australia) Garry McCoy	Red Bull Yamaha WCM	Yamaha	22	+45.144	4	3
14	33	(Japan) Akira Ryō	Team Suzuki	Suzuki	22	+51.932	20	2
15	31	(Japan) Tetsuya Harada	Pramac Honda Racing Team	Honda	22	+1:02.171	17	1
16	55	(France) Régis Laconi	MS Aprilia Racing	Aprilia	22	+1:02.238	18	
17	50	(France) Sylvain Guintoli	Yamaha Tech 3	Yamaha	22	+1:13.465	21	
Ret (18)	46	(Italy) Valentino Rossi	Repsol Honda Team	Honda	20	Tyre Wear	3	
Ret (19)	21	(United States) John Hopkins	Red Bull Yamaha WCM	Yamaha	12	Retirement	7	
Ret (20)	9	(Japan) Nobuatsu Aoki	Proton Team KR	Proton KR	11	Accident	14	
Ret (21)	56	(Japan) Shinya Nakano	Gauloises Yamaha Tech 3	Yamaha	0	Accident	11	
DNS	20	(Spain) Pere Riba	Antena 3 Yamaha d'Antín	Yamaha	0	Did not start	22	

== 250 cc classification ==
Pos.	No.	Rider	Manufacturer	Laps	Time/Retired	Grid	Points
1	3	(Italy) Marco Melandri	Aprilia	20	41:41.572	2	25
2	9	(Argentina) Sebastián Porto	Yamaha	20	+7.023	3	20
3	24	(Spain) Toni Elías	Aprilia	20	+8.135	7	16
4	10	(Spain) Fonsi Nieto	Aprilia	20	+8.307	1	13
5	27	(Australia) Casey Stoner	Aprilia	20	+11.322	20	11
6	17	(France) Randy de Puniet	Aprilia	20	+11.636	9	10
7	15	(Italy) Roberto Locatelli	Aprilia	20	+16.988	4	9
8	8	(Japan) Naoki Matsudo	Yamaha	20	+20.984	8	8
9	11	(Japan) Haruchika Aoki	Honda	20	+21.002	12	7
10	84	(Spain) David García	Honda	20	+30.259	17	6
11	26	(Germany) Ralf Waldmann	Aprilia	20	+30.357	10	5
12	12	(United Kingdom) Jay Vincent	Honda	20	+30.805	14	4
13	6	(Spain) Alex Debón	Aprilia	20	+43.592	11	3
14	28	(Germany) Dirk Heidolf	Aprilia	20	+44.141	22	2
15	22	(Spain) Raúl Jara	Aprilia	20	+50.513	16	1
16	36	(France) Erwan Nigon	Aprilia	20	+1:02.225	23	
17	19	(United Kingdom) Leon Haslam	Honda	20	+1:04.058	19	
18	42	(Spain) David Checa	Aprilia	20	+1:15.519	15	
19	29	(Netherlands) Henk vd Lagemaat	Honda	20	+2:05.290	25	
20	63	(Hungary) Gábor Rizmayer	Honda	19	+1 lap	27	
Ret (21)	21	(Italy) Franco Battaini	Aprilia	19	Accident	5	
Ret (22)	32	(Spain) Héctor Faubel	Aprilia	19	Accident	21	
Ret (23)	4	(Italy) Roberto Rolfo	Honda	18	Accident	6	
Ret (24)	13	(Czech Republic) Jaroslav Huleš	Yamaha	15	Retirement	24	
Ret (25)	18	(Malaysia) Shahrol Yuzy	Yamaha	10	Accident	13	
Ret (26)	64	(Slovakia) Vladimír Častka	Yamaha	4	Retirement	26	
Ret (27)	51	(France) Hugo Marchand	Aprilia	0	Accident	18	
DNS	62	(Czech Republic) Radomil Rous	Honda		Did not start		
DNQ	65	(Switzerland) Roger Heierli	Honda		Did not qualify		

== 125 cc classification ==
Pos.	No.	Rider	Manufacturer	Laps	Time/Retired	Grid	Points
1	4	(Italy) Lucio Cecchinello	Aprilia	19	41:18.287	6	25
2	26	(Spain) Daniel Pedrosa	Honda	19	+0.202	3	20
3	21	(France) Arnaud Vincent	Aprilia	19	+0.278	8	16
4	80	(Spain) Héctor Barberá	Aprilia	19	+0.494	9	13
5	1	(San Marino) Manuel Poggiali	Gilera	19	+0.495	4	11
6	17	(Germany) Steve Jenkner	Aprilia	19	+0.717	5	10
7	16	(Italy) Simone Sanna	Aprilia	19	+0.901	2	9
8	15	(San Marino) Alex de Angelis	Aprilia	19	+1.309	1	8
9	23	(Italy) Gino Borsoi	Aprilia	19	+5.579	10	7
10	36	(Finland) Mika Kallio	Honda	19	+7.091	14	6
11	8	(Hungary) Gábor Talmácsi	Honda	19	+7.360	11	5
12	5	(Japan) Masao Azuma	Honda	19	+14.326	19	4
13	33	(Italy) Stefano Bianco	Aprilia	19	+14.345	15	3
14	6	(Italy) Mirko Giansanti	Honda	19	+16.990	20	2
15	11	(Italy) Max Sabbatani	Aprilia	19	+18.106	22	1
16	12	(Germany) Klaus Nöhles	Honda	19	+18.186	17	
17	41	(Japan) Youichi Ui	Derbi	19	+22.341	13	
18	7	(Italy) Stefano Perugini	Italjet	19	+22.408	16	
19	77	(Switzerland) Thomas Lüthi	Honda	19	+22.442	18	
20	48	(Spain) Jorge Lorenzo	Derbi	19	+41.048	27	
21	34	(Italy) Andrea Dovizioso	Honda	19	+41.208	21	
22	53	(Italy) Gioele Pellino	Aprilia	19	+44.018	26	
23	88	(Denmark) Robbin Harms	Honda	19	+50.207	29	
24	31	(Italy) Mattia Angeloni	Gilera	19	+50.372	34	
25	84	(Italy) Michel Fabrizio	Gilera	19	+50.451	28	
26	20	(Hungary) Imre Tóth	Honda	19	+50.700	30	
27	37	(Italy) Marco Simoncelli	Aprilia	19	+50.746	24	
28	49	(Czech Republic) Igor Kaláb	Honda	19	+51.560	35	
29	72	(Germany) Dario Giuseppetti	Honda	19	+1:07.328	32	
30	76	(Czech Republic) Matěj Smrž	Aprilia	19	+1:47.385	33	
Ret (31)	56	(Czech Republic) Lukáš Pešek	Honda	15	Accident	25	
Ret (32)	50	(Italy) Andrea Ballerini	Honda	13	Retirement	23	
Ret (33)	22	(Spain) Pablo Nieto	Aprilia	7	Accident	7	
Ret (34)	25	(Spain) Joan Olivé	Honda	6	Accident	12	
Ret (35)	42	(Italy) Christian Pistoni	Italjet	5	Retirement	31	
DNS	57	(United Kingdom) Chaz Davies	Aprilia		Did not start		
WD	19	(Italy) Alex Baldolini	Aprilia		Withdrew		

== Championship standings after the race (MotoGP) ==
Below are the standings for the top five riders and constructors after round ten has concluded.

Riders' Championship standings

Pos.	Rider	Points
1	(Italy) Valentino Rossi	220
2	(Japan) Tohru Ukawa	140
3	(Italy) Max Biaggi	134
4	(Spain) Carlos Checa	96
5	(Brazil) Alex Barros	94

Constructors' Championship standings

Pos.	Constructor	Points
1	(Japan) Honda	245
2	(Japan) Yamaha	170
3	(Japan) Suzuki	86
4	(Malaysia) / (United States) Proton KR	57
5	(Italy) Aprilia	28

- Note: Only the top five positions are included for both sets of standings.

Previous race: 2002 German Grand Prix	FIM Grand Prix World Championship; 2002 season	Next race: 2002 Portuguese Grand Prix
Previous race: 2001 Czech Republic Grand Prix	Czech Republic motorcycle Grand Prix	Next race: 2003 Czech Republic Grand Prix
