= 2004 Japanese motorcycle Grand Prix =

(Japan) 2004 Japanese Grand Prix
Race details
- Race 12 of 16 races in the 2004 Grand Prix motorcycle racing season
- Date: 19 September 2004
- Official name: Camel Grand Prix of Japan
- Location: Twin Ring Motegi
- Course: Permanent racing facility; 4.801 km (2.983 mi)

MotoGP
Pole position
- Rider: (Japan) Makoto Tamada
- Time: 1:46.673
Fastest lap
- Rider: (Japan) Makoto Tamada
- Time: 1:48.524 on lap 5
Podium
- First: (Japan) Makoto Tamada
- Second: (Italy) Valentino Rossi
- Third: (Japan) Shinya Nakano

250cc
Pole position
- Rider: (Spain) Daniel Pedrosa
- Time: 1:52.137
Fastest lap
- Rider: (Spain) Daniel Pedrosa
- Time: 1:52.788 on lap 19
Podium
- First: (Spain) Daniel Pedrosa
- Second: (Spain) Toni Elías
- Third: (Japan) Hiroshi Aoyama

125cc
Pole position
- Rider: (Italy) Andrea Dovizioso
- Time: 1:58.385
Fastest lap
- Rider: (Italy) Andrea Dovizioso
- Time: 1:58.766 on lap 4
Podium
- First: (Italy) Andrea Dovizioso
- Second: (Italy) Fabrizio Lai
- Third: (Italy) Simone Corsi

The 2004 Japanese motorcycle Grand Prix was the twelfth round of the 2004 MotoGP Championship. It took place on the weekend of 17–19 September 2004 at the Twin Ring Motegi circuit.

== MotoGP race report ==
This race was most notable for Makoto Tamada's home victory starting from pole, as well as Kawasaki's first podium with Nakano's third place finish and Barros' climb up to fourth from tenth on the grid. This also turned out to be the final premier class win for Tamada, as well as the most recent race won by a Japanese rider in the premier class until Ai Ogura won the 2026 Dutch TT.

One day before the race, on Saturday, Daijiro Kato's father presented two minibikes which will be sold this Fall in Japan. This was done to commemorate his son, who died last year during the 2003 Japanese Grand Prix at the now scrapped Suzuka Circuit after a high-speed collision with the barriers at the Casio Triangle.

After eleven rounds, Valentino Rossi is ahead of the rest with 209 points. Not far behind is Sete Gibernau in second with 180 points and third in the standings is Max Biaggi with 158 points.

Home hero Makoto Tamada took pole position on Saturday with a time of 1:46.673. Close second was John Hopkins and third was Valentino Rossi. The second row of the grid consisted out of Max Biaggi in fourth, Colin Edwards in fifth and Marco Melandri in sixth.

All riders take off and do their usual warm-up lap before lining up in their respective grid slots. As the lights go out, it is Hopkins who initially gets the better start and looks to lead going into Turn 1. However, it is Rossi manages to lunge ahead and leads going into the corner. As Hopkins turns in, he fails to spot Loris Capirossi who had a great start from seventh on the grid and collides with him as Capirossi loses the front and rear. This causes a chain reaction, bringing down Kenny Roberts Jr., Max Biaggi and Nicky Hayden with them. Six riders had now been eliminated on the opening lap, but Tamada – who had a bad start and thus lost multiple positions – was not one of the casualties. The marshalls run up to the stranded riders as the dust settles, revealing that all the riders except for Hayden had gone down (Hayden was stuck in the gravel). Biaggi is also stuck, the marshalls pushing his bike as a wounded Hopkins lies injured in the gravel. Capirossi has not moved since the incident and has been put on a stretcher, two of the marshalls lifting him up to bring him to the medical centre. Rossi meanwhile has been able to open up a gap to second place Tamada already. However, he quickly closes this entering Turn 11, pursuing Rossi for the remainder of the lap. Also at the straight before Turn 11, Sete Gibernau tries to pass Norifumi Abe by going up his inside, failing and having to stay behind him for the time being.

On lap two, the top six is as follows: Rossi, Tamada, Melandri, Shinya Nakano, Abe and Gibernau. Tamada has opened up a big gap to third place Melandri, who himself is coming under pressure from Nakano. At Turn 11, Tamada looks to be passing Rossi but stays behind for the time being.

Lap three and Tamada is still right behind Rossi, biting his time and not yet making a move. Behind him, Melandri is still being followed by Nakano, Abe, Gibernau and Carlos Checa.

On lap four, Tamada sets the fastest lap of the race. Abe has overtaken Nakano for fourth before Turn 9. Nakano then tries to retake the position at the end of the straight coming up to Turn 11, deciding to stay behind for the time being.

Lap five and Tamada sets another fastest lap of the race. Checa is now losing touch with the back of Gibernau while Tamada is still all over the rear of Rossi. Exiting Turn 11, Nakano's exhaust started to blow some light smoke, but it does not indicate an engine problem.

On lap six, Tamada is still all over the rear of Rossi. At the end of the straight leading up to Turn 11, he makes the move, going side by side with Rossi and getting ahead upon entry.

Lap seven and Tamada now leads his home grand prix, Rossi still right behind him and ready to strike if he makes a mistake, however. At Turn 10, Rossi goes in a bit too deep and runs wide, allowing Tamada to open up a slight gap.

On lap eight, Tamada is now increasing his gap slightly. His teammate further back – Abe – is now coming under pressure from Nakano however. Exiting Turn 11, he manages to get closer again.

Lap nine and Rossi is still close to Tamada. Tohru Ukawa has crashed out of the race, the Japanese rider walking away unhurt and disappointed as the marshalls recover his bike.

On lap ten, it is revealed that Capirossi – who was taken away by stretcher earlier in the race – has a small fracture in his foot, as well as a minor concussion. Hopkins has minor bruises and a dislocated elbow for Roberts Jr. Troy Bayliss has now closed right up to Checa, then Abe suddenly slows down as a mechanical problem ends his good run in fourth, the Japanese shaking his head. This promotes Melandri to third, Nakano to fourth, Gibernau to fifth and Checa to sixth. At the straight before Turn 11, Bayliss has a look up the inside of Checa, deciding better of it and staying behind for now. Behind Bayliss, Alex Barros has also closed the gap and is now behind Bayliss in eighth.

Lap eleven and Tamada's gap back to Rossi is +0.594 seconds. The top six is as follows: Tamada, Rossi, Melandri, Nakano, Gibernau and Checa. Abe enters the pits to retire his bike, visibly shaking his head in disappointment. At the straight coming up to Turn 4, Bayliss goes alongside Checa and passes him for sixth, sliding his Marlboro Ducati into the corner and just hanging on.

On lap twelve – the halfway point of the race – Barros goes side by side with Checa at the start/finish straight, passing the Spaniard and taking seventh from him. In sector two, the gap Tamada has to Rossi is +1.116 seconds, which increases to +1.139 seconds in sector three.

Lap thirteen and Tamada continues to slowly extend his lead over Rossi. No overtakes happened at the front.

On lap fourteen, Nakano has closed up on Melandri, shadowing the Italian for third. Behind them, Bayliss has closed up on Gibernau for fifth, Barros closing up on the duo as well.

Lap fifteen and Bayliss has gotten past Gibernau. He goes up the inside of the Spaniard at the straight heading towards Turn 4, promoting him up to fifth position. Barros has also caught up with a now struggling Gibernau.

On lap sixteen, Tamada's gap back to Rossi is now +2.393 seconds. At the end of the straight, heading up to Turn 4, Barros passes Gibernau by lunging up his inside and outbreaking him entering the corner, moving him up to sixth place. The Brazilian is now catching up with Bayliss.

Lap seventeen and Tamada is still in front, slowly extending his lead still. The top six is as follows: Tamada, Rossi, Melandri, Nakano, Bayliss and Barros. No overtakes happened at the front.

On lap eighteen, Nakano is still behind Melandri, shadowing him and waiting for the right moment to strike. Barros is doing likewise behind Bayliss. Gibernau behind them is still struggling down in seventh place.

Lap nineteen and Nakano is now right behind Melandri. Exiting Turn 4, he tries to pass Melandri on the outside, heading into Turn 5, the Italian blocking him off and preventing him from getting by. At the straight heading up to Turn 11, Nakano goes side by side and passes Melandri for third, who then does a switchback move and tries to retake the position. However, he runs wide, loses momentum exiting the corner and hands Nakano the position at last, the Kawasaki section of fans on the grandstands going wild after he does so.

On lap twenty, the top six is as follows: Tamada, Rossi, Nakano, Melandri, Bayliss and Barros. At the front, Tamada has pulled a significant gap back to Rossi by now. Bayliss has gone down, the rider angrily walking away from the crash site as a marshall guides him off the circuit.

Lap twenty-one and Tamada's gap back to Rossi is now +4.079 seconds. Barros has also passed Melandri by diving down his inside at Turn 7, promoting him to fourth.

On lap twenty-two, Barros now pulls away from the Italian and is going after third place Nakano for the podium. Tamada's gap back to Rossi is now +4.672 seconds.

Lap twenty-three, the penultimate lap, and the top six is as follows: Tamada, Rossi, Nakano, Barros, Melandri and Gibernau. Barros has not been able to get much closer to Nakano so far.

The last lap – lap twenty-four – has begun and Tamada is still out in front, with Rossi a distant second. The Japanese fans at the Camel Honda booth go wild as Tamada approaches the last set of corners and heads onto the start/finish straight, the Japanese briefly looking behind him before doing a wheelie and crossing the line to win the race – his second race win of the season and his MotoGP career. Rossi finishes second and Nakano, on the Kawasaki, finishes a sensational third for the young constructor.

On the parade lap back to parc-fermé, Rossi shakes hands with Tamada while still on the bike, congratulating him on his win. The marshalls also wave their flags and congratulate all the riders as well. Tamada celebrates by putting his arms up in the air to signal victory. The fans in the grandstand put up a big banner of the Camel Honda team to celebrate Tamada's and the team's victory. Tamada waves at the crowd and a rider shakes his hand as congratulations, then pulls another wheelie in joy. Nakano waves the Kawasaki flag, celebrating his and the team's first podium in the premier class since their return in 2002. The Kawasaki stand also goes wild, waving flags in salute of Nakano and the team. Rossi also celebrates, doing a wheelie at the straight before Turn 11 as well, briefly waving at the crowd. Tamada meanwhile is still happily waving at the crowd, Rossi doing likewise, then pulling right to stop his bike at the barrier. Tamada stops at the straight before Turn 11, two Japanese fans invading the track to run up to him and give him the Japanese flag. The fans then run off the circuit, Tamada riding again and proudly displaying the Japanese flag for everyone to see. He waves his arms around a bit more before going under the tunnel and heading onto the start/finish straight.

Rossi is the first one to arrive to parc-fermé, unbuckling his helmet and waving to the camera. Tamada also heads to the pits and parc-fermé, then gets greeted cheerfully by his crewmembers – one hugging him and the other holding the Japanese flag. Tamada then hugs his other crewmember also before running up to his team and celebrating with them. Nakano also arrives at parc-fermé, stepping off his bike with the Kawasaki flag still in his hand. One of his crewmembers hugs him, then another one does so as well, dragging him to the rest of the team to celebrate third place. Tamada is now being interviewed by Japanese television.

The riders head up to the podium, the first one being Nakano, who gets a very warm welcome as the Japanese fans clap and cheer loudly for him. Second is Rossi who also gets a warm welcome from the fans. Rossi then shakes hands with Nakano. Then Tamada is announced, sending the home fans into a frenzy, the airhorns blowing and the cheers being heard loudly. He shakes hands with Rossi and Nakano, then steps onto the podium. Ikuo Shimizu, then president of the Twin Ring Motegi, hands out third-place trophy to Nakano, the fans clapping loudly as he receives it. Next up is Rossi, who also gets a loud applause as he lifts his trophy and then Martyn Griffiths, then Vice-President Marketing Asia of Japan Tobacco International, hands Tamada the winners trophy. He happily receives it and lifts it up, the fans loudly cheering and blowing their airhorns as a result. The Japanese nation anthem plays for Tamada, the fans once again cheering loudly once it stops. The girls on the podium hand the riders the champagne, Rossi then cheekily spraying one of them as the other two spray into the crowd, then each other. Once they are done, they put the champagne down and pose for the group photo. Tamada then thanks the fans in a short interview on the podium.

Rossi's second place, Gibernau's sixth place and Biaggi's back-to-back DNF now means that Rossi extends his lead in the championship. 'The Doctor' leads the title hunt with 229 points, followed by Gibernau with 190 points and Biaggi, still stuck in 158 points.

== MotoGP classification ==
Pos.	No.	Rider	Team	Manufacturer	Laps	Time/Retired	Grid	Points
1	6	(Japan) Makoto Tamada	Camel Honda	Honda	24	43:43.220	1	25
2	46	(Italy) Valentino Rossi	Gauloises Fortuna Yamaha	Yamaha	24	+6.168	3	20
3	56	(Japan) Shinya Nakano	Kawasaki Racing Team	Kawasaki	24	+13.396	12	16
4	4	(Brazil) Alex Barros	Repsol Honda Team	Honda	24	+15.435	10	13
5	33	(Italy) Marco Melandri	Fortuna Gauloises Tech 3	Yamaha	24	+23.577	6	11
6	15	(Spain) Sete Gibernau	Telefónica Movistar Honda MotoGP	Honda	24	+27.378	13	10
7	7	(Spain) Carlos Checa	Gauloises Fortuna Yamaha	Yamaha	24	+35.834	11	9
8	50	(United Kingdom) Neil Hodgson	D'Antin MotoGP	Ducati	24	+47.976	17	8
9	11	(Spain) Rubén Xaus	D'Antin MotoGP	Ducati	24	+49.881	18	7
10	66	(Germany) Alex Hofmann	Kawasaki Racing Team	Kawasaki	24	+56.107	19	6
11	19	(France) Olivier Jacque	Moriwaki WCM	Moriwaki	24	+1:21.237	21	5
12	99	(United Kingdom) Jeremy McWilliams	MS Aprilia Racing	Aprilia	24	+1:27.683	20	4
13	67	(United Kingdom) Shane Byrne	MS Aprilia Racing	Aprilia	23	+1 lap	23	3
14	9	(Japan) Nobuatsu Aoki	Proton Team KR	Proton KR	23	+1 lap	22	2
15	41	(Japan) Youichi Ui	WCM	Harris WCM	23	+1 lap	24	1
Ret	12	(Australia) Troy Bayliss	Ducati Marlboro Team	Ducati	19	Accident	16	
Ret	17	(Japan) Norifumi Abe	Fortuna Gauloises Tech 3	Yamaha	9	Retirement	15	
Ret	72	(Japan) Tohru Ukawa	HRC	Honda	8	Accident	14	
Ret	10	(United States) Kenny Roberts Jr.	Team Suzuki MotoGP	Suzuki	0	Accident	8	
Ret	21	(United States) John Hopkins	Team Suzuki MotoGP	Suzuki	0	Accident	2	
Ret	3	(Italy) Max Biaggi	Camel Honda	Honda	0	Accident	4	
Ret	45	(United States) Colin Edwards	Telefónica Movistar Honda MotoGP	Honda	0	Accident	5	
Ret	65	(Italy) Loris Capirossi	Ducati Marlboro Team	Ducati	0	Accident	7	
Ret	69	(United States) Nicky Hayden	Repsol Honda Team	Honda	0	Accident	9	

== 250 cc classification ==
Pos.	No.	Rider	Manufacturer	Laps	Time/Retired	Grid	Points
1	26	(Spain) Daniel Pedrosa	Honda	23	43:36.798	1	25
2	24	(Spain) Toni Elías	Honda	23	+3.174	4	20
3	73	(Japan) Hiroshi Aoyama	Honda	23	+15.991	2	16
4	19	(Argentina) Sebastián Porto	Aprilia	23	+20.075	5	13
5	55	(Japan) Yuki Takahashi	Honda	23	+25.450	6	11
6	51	(San Marino) Alex de Angelis	Aprilia	23	+33.451	7	10
7	2	(Italy) Roberto Rolfo	Honda	23	+43.084	12	9
8	76	(Japan) Shuhei Aoyama	Honda	23	+43.270	13	8
9	21	(Italy) Franco Battaini	Aprilia	23	+48.773	9	7
10	6	(Spain) Alex Debón	Honda	23	+52.000	14	6
11	7	(France) Randy de Puniet	Aprilia	23	+1:00.707	3	5
12	78	(Japan) Yuzo Fujioka	Honda	23	+1:01.472	15	4
13	8	(Japan) Naoki Matsudo	Yamaha	23	+1:02.120	16	3
14	9	(France) Hugo Marchand	Aprilia	23	+1:06.488	25	2
15	33	(Spain) Héctor Faubel	Aprilia	23	+1:09.070	18	1
16	70	(Japan) Choujun Kameya	Honda	23	+1:12.091	17	
17	54	(San Marino) Manuel Poggiali	Aprilia	23	+1:15.444	10	
18	44	(Japan) Taro Sekiguchi	Yamaha	23	+1:17.484	30	
19	50	(France) Sylvain Guintoli	Aprilia	23	+1:17.753	24	
20	79	(Japan) Katsuyuki Nakasuga	Yamaha	23	+1:27.294	28	
21	28	(Germany) Dirk Heidolf	Aprilia	23	+1:44.246	23	
22	36	(France) Erwan Nigon	Aprilia	23	+1:45.825	20	
Ret	11	(Spain) Joan Olivé	Aprilia	22	Retirement	26	
Ret	57	(United Kingdom) Chaz Davies	Aprilia	20	Accident	19	
Ret	14	(Australia) Anthony West	Aprilia	18	Retirement	8	
Ret	17	(Germany) Klaus Nöhles	Honda	17	Retirement	33	
Ret	43	(Czech Republic) Radomil Rous	Yamaha	13	Retirement	32	
Ret	16	(Sweden) Johan Stigefelt	Aprilia	12	Retirement	29	
Ret	10	(Spain) Fonsi Nieto	Aprilia	11	Retirement	11	
Ret	25	(Italy) Alex Baldolini	Aprilia	6	Retirement	31	
Ret	96	(Czech Republic) Jakub Smrž	Honda	5	Accident	21	
Ret	12	(France) Arnaud Vincent	Aprilia	1	Retirement	27	
DNS	34	(France) Eric Bataille	Honda	0	Did not start	22	
DNQ	88	(Hungary) Gergő Talmácsi	Yamaha		Did not qualify		

== 125 cc classification ==
The race, scheduled to be run for 21 laps, was stopped after 8 full laps due to an accident. It was later restarted for the remaining 13 laps, with the grid determined by the running order before the suspension. The second part of the race determined the final result.

Pos.	No.	Rider	Manufacturer	Laps	Time/Retired	Grid	Points
1	34	(Italy) Andrea Dovizioso	Honda	13	25:52.175	1	25
2	32	(Italy) Fabrizio Lai	Gilera	13	+11.082	12	20
3	24	(Italy) Simone Corsi	Honda	13	+11.101	10	16
4	6	(Italy) Mirko Giansanti	Aprilia	13	+11.341	15	13
5	21	(Germany) Steve Jenkner	Aprilia	13	+11.519	14	11
6	58	(Italy) Marco Simoncelli	Aprilia	13	+14.491	11	10
7	48	(Spain) Jorge Lorenzo	Derbi	13	+25.279	6	9
8	14	(Hungary) Gábor Talmácsi	Malaguti	13	+25.320	7	8
9	89	(Japan) Tomoyoshi Koyama	Yamaha	13	+25.863	17	7
10	62	(Japan) Toshihisa Kuzuhara	Honda	13	+30.172	24	6
11	23	(Italy) Gino Borsoi	Aprilia	13	+30.432	13	5
12	12	(Switzerland) Thomas Lüthi	Honda	13	+30.562	19	4
13	33	(Spain) Sergio Gadea	Aprilia	13	+32.170	25	3
14	15	(Italy) Roberto Locatelli	Aprilia	13	+32.971	2	2
15	66	(Finland) Vesa Kallio	Aprilia	13	+41.950	29	1
16	42	(Italy) Gioele Pellino	Aprilia	13	+42.058	37	
17	67	(Thailand) Suhathai Chaemsap	Honda	13	+44.536	31	
18	43	(Spain) Manuel Hernández	Aprilia	13	+51.234	32	
19	28	(Spain) Jordi Carchano	Aprilia	13	+51.283	30	
20	16	(Netherlands) Raymond Schouten	Honda	13	+1:04.719	35	
21	45	(Italy) Lorenzo Zanetti	Aprilia	13	+1:11.829	33	
22	8	(Italy) Manuel Manna	Malaguti	13	+1:13.894	36	
23	9	(Czech Republic) Markéta Janáková	Honda	13	+1:36.250	38	
Ret	47	(Spain) Ángel Rodríguez	Derbi	11	Accident	22	
Ret	64	(Japan) Shigeki Norikane	Yamaha	10	Accident	28	
Ret	3	(Spain) Héctor Barberá	Aprilia	8	Retirement	4	
Ret	36	(Finland) Mika Kallio	KTM	7	Accident	5	
Ret	52	(Czech Republic) Lukáš Pešek	Honda	3	Accident	8	
Ret	7	(Italy) Stefano Perugini	Gilera	1	Retirement	23	
Ret	19	(Spain) Álvaro Bautista	Aprilia	0	Accident	18	
Ret	26	(Germany) Dario Giuseppetti	Honda	0	Accident	26	
Ret	22	(Spain) Pablo Nieto	Aprilia	0	Retirement in 1st part	9	
Ret	25	(Hungary) Imre Tóth	Aprilia	0	Did not restart	27	
Ret	27	(Australia) Casey Stoner	KTM	0	Retirement in 1st part	3	
Ret	50	(Italy) Andrea Ballerini	Aprilia	0	Did not restart	16	
Ret	54	(Italy) Mattia Pasini	Aprilia	0	Accident in 1st part	20	
Ret	63	(France) Mike Di Meglio	Aprilia	0	Accident in 1st part	21	
Ret	95	(Japan) Yuki Hatano	Honda	0	Accident in 1st part	34	
DNS	69	(Denmark) Robbin Harms	Honda		Did not start		

== Championship standings after the race (MotoGP) ==
Below are the standings for the top five riders and constructors after round twelve has concluded.

Riders' Championship standings

Pos.	Rider	Points
1	(Italy) Valentino Rossi	229
2	(Spain) Sete Gibernau	190
3	(Italy) Max Biaggi	158
4	(Brazil) Alex Barros	115
5	(Japan) Makoto Tamada	114

Constructors' Championship standings

Pos.	Constructor	Points
1	(Japan) Honda	270
2	(Japan) Yamaha	244
3	(Italy) Ducati	111
4	(Japan) Kawasaki	67
5	(Japan) Suzuki	58

- Note: Only the top five positions are included for both sets of standings.

Previous race: 2004 Portuguese Grand Prix	FIM Grand Prix World Championship; 2004 season	Next race: 2004 Qatar Grand Prix
Previous race: 2003 Japanese Grand Prix	Japanese motorcycle Grand Prix	Next race: 2005 Japanese Grand Prix
