= 2000 Pacific motorcycle Grand Prix =

(Tochigi Prefecture) 2000 Pacific Grand Prix
Race details
- Race 15 of 16 races in the 2000 Grand Prix motorcycle racing season
- Date: 15 October 2000
- Official name: Pacific Grand Prix of Motegi
- Location: Twin Ring Motegi
- Course: Permanent racing facility; 4.801 km (2.983 mi)

500cc
Pole position
- Rider: (Italy) Max Biaggi
- Time: 1:49.954
Fastest lap
- Rider: (Italy) Valentino Rossi
- Time: 1:50.591 on lap 22
Podium
- First: (United States) Kenny Roberts Jr.
- Second: (Italy) Valentino Rossi
- Third: (Italy) Max Biaggi

250cc
Pole position
- Rider: (Japan) Daijiro Kato
- Time: 1:52.574
Fastest lap
- Rider: (Japan) Shinya Nakano
- Time: 1:52.253 on lap 23
Podium
- First: (Japan) Daijiro Kato
- Second: (Japan) Shinya Nakano
- Third: (Italy) Marco Melandri

125cc
Pole position
- Rider: (Italy) Roberto Locatelli
- Time: 1:58.831
Fastest lap
- Rider: (Italy) Roberto Locatelli
- Time: 1:58.816 on lap 7
Podium
- First: (Italy) Roberto Locatelli
- Second: (Spain) Emilio Alzamora
- Third: (Italy) Simone Sanna

The 2000 Pacific motorcycle Grand Prix was the fifteenth round of the 2000 Grand Prix motorcycle racing season. It took place on 15 October 2000 at the Twin Ring Motegi.

== 500 cc classification ==
Pos.	No.	Rider	Team	Manufacturer	Laps	Time/Retired	Grid	Points
1	2	(United States) Kenny Roberts Jr.	Telefónica Movistar Suzuki	Suzuki	25	46:23.327	2	25
2	46	(Italy) Valentino Rossi	Nastro Azzurro Honda	Honda	25	+6.175	5	20
3	4	(Italy) Max Biaggi	Marlboro Yamaha Team	Yamaha	25	+6.360	1	16
4	7	(Spain) Carlos Checa	Marlboro Yamaha Team	Yamaha	25	+19.727	7	13
5	6	(Japan) Norick Abe	Antena 3 Yamaha d'Antin	Yamaha	25	+21.994	6	11
6	1	(Spain) Àlex Crivillé	Repsol YPF Honda Team	Honda	25	+22.237	12	10
7	10	(Brazil) Alex Barros	Emerson Honda Pons	Honda	25	+23.963	4	9
8	65	(Italy) Loris Capirossi	Emerson Honda Pons	Honda	25	+26.051	3	8
9	9	(Japan) Nobuatsu Aoki	Telefónica Movistar Suzuki	Suzuki	25	+26.388	10	7
10	8	(Japan) Tadayuki Okada	Repsol YPF Honda Team	Honda	25	+32.508	9	6
11	55	(France) Régis Laconi	Red Bull Yamaha WCM	Yamaha	25	+36.078	13	5
12	5	(Spain) Sete Gibernau	Repsol YPF Honda Team	Honda	25	+37.760	11	4
13	31	(Japan) Tetsuya Harada	Blu Aprilia Team	Aprilia	25	+38.014	16	3
14	99	(United Kingdom) Jeremy McWilliams	Blu Aprilia Team	Aprilia	25	+55.657	14	2
15	17	(Netherlands) Jurgen van den Goorbergh	Rizla Honda	TSR-Honda	25	+1:06.664	15	1
16	56	(Japan) Tekkyu Kayoh	Tecmas Honda Elf	Honda	25	+1:28.554	17	
17	33	(Spain) David Tomás	Sabre Sport	Honda	24	+1 lap	19	
18	15	(Japan) Yoshiteru Konishi	FCC TSR	TSR-Honda	24	+1 lap	20	
Ret	24	(Australia) Garry McCoy	Red Bull Yamaha WCM	Yamaha	17	Retirement	8	
DNS	68	(Australia) Mark Willis	Proton Team KR	Modenas KR3	0	Did not start	18	
DNQ	36	(New Zealand) Stephen Briggs	BSL	BSL		Did not qualify		
WD	25	(Spain) José Luis Cardoso	Maxon Dee Cee Jeans	Honda		Withdrew		

== 250cc classification ==
Pos.	No.	Rider	Manufacturer	Laps	Time/Retired	Grid	Points
1	74	(Japan) Daijiro Kato	Honda	23	43:26.394	1	25
2	56	(Japan) Shinya Nakano	Yamaha	23	+0.707	3	20
3	35	(Italy) Marco Melandri	Aprilia	23	+19.677	2	16
4	19	(France) Olivier Jacque	Yamaha	23	+24.260	5	13
5	4	(Japan) Tohru Ukawa	Honda	23	+28.673	4	11
6	14	(Australia) Anthony West	Honda	23	+49.317	9	10
7	6	(Germany) Ralf Waldmann	Aprilia	23	+50.661	7	9
8	89	(Japan) Hiroshi Aoyama	Honda	23	+1:06.700	17	8
9	24	(United Kingdom) Jason Vincent	Aprilia	23	+1:08.330	13	7
10	88	(Japan) Yasumasa Hatakeyama	Honda	23	+1:14.158	12	6
11	18	(Malaysia) Shahrol Yuzy	Yamaha	23	+1:20.838	15	5
12	30	(Spain) Alex Debón	Aprilia	23	+1:20.946	8	4
13	37	(Italy) Luca Boscoscuro	Aprilia	23	+1:22.398	18	3
14	10	(Spain) Fonsi Nieto	Yamaha	23	+1:22.817	14	2
15	42	(Spain) David Checa	TSR-Honda	23	+1:22.942	16	1
16	8	(Japan) Naoki Matsudo	Yamaha	23	+1:37.060	20	
17	90	(Japan) Yoshinori Korogi	Honda	23	+1:46.753	26	
18	22	(France) Sébastien Gimbert	TSR-Honda	23	+1:46.792	29	
19	16	(Sweden) Johan Stigefelt	TSR-Honda	23	+1:48.952	27	
Ret	9	(Argentina) Sebastián Porto	Yamaha	14	Accident	10	
Ret	23	(France) Julien Allemand	Yamaha	5	Retirement	23	
Ret	77	(United Kingdom) Jamie Robinson	Aprilia	2	Accident	28	
Ret	21	(Italy) Franco Battaini	Aprilia	1	Accident	6	
Ret	25	(France) Vincent Philippe	TSR-Honda	0	Accident	21	
Ret	26	(Germany) Klaus Nöhles	Aprilia	0	Accident	24	
Ret	31	(Spain) Lucas Oliver	Yamaha	0	Accident	30	
Ret	41	(Netherlands) Jarno Janssen	TSR-Honda	0	Accident	25	
Ret	44	(Italy) Roberto Rolfo	Aprilia	0	Accident	22	
Ret	48	(Japan) Shinichi Nakatomi	Honda	0	Accident	19	
DSQ	49	(Japan) Osamu Miyazaki	Yamaha	23	(+1:08.510)	11	
DNS	15	(United Kingdom) Adrian Coates	Aprilia		Did not start		
DNS	11	(Italy) Ivan Clementi	Aprilia		Did not start		
DNS	20	(Spain) Jerónimo Vidal	Aprilia		Did not start		

== 125 cc classification ==
Pos.	No.	Rider	Manufacturer	Laps	Time/Retired	Grid	Points
1	4	(Italy) Roberto Locatelli	Aprilia	21	41:55.152	1	25
2	1	(Spain) Emilio Alzamora	Honda	21	+13.790	5	20
3	16	(Italy) Simone Sanna	Aprilia	21	+16.429	12	16
4	3	(Japan) Masao Azuma	Honda	21	+21.734	4	13
5	26	(Italy) Ivan Goi	Honda	21	+28.060	8	11
6	15	(San Marino) Alex de Angelis	Honda	21	+28.277	10	10
7	5	(Japan) Noboru Ueda	Honda	21	+28.322	7	9
8	21	(France) Arnaud Vincent	Aprilia	21	+29.155	6	8
9	22	(Spain) Pablo Nieto	Derbi	21	+29.521	18	7
10	29	(Spain) Ángel Nieto Jr.	Honda	21	+33.499	11	6
11	54	(San Marino) Manuel Poggiali	Derbi	21	+38.889	13	5
12	18	(Spain) Antonio Elías	Honda	21	+39.828	21	4
13	17	(Germany) Steve Jenkner	Honda	21	+39.983	15	3
14	23	(Italy) Gino Borsoi	Aprilia	21	+40.151	20	2
15	56	(Japan) Yuzo Fujioka	NER Honda	21	+55.189	14	1
16	96	(Japan) Tomoyoshi Koyama	Yamaha	21	+55.212	22	
17	8	(Italy) Gianluigi Scalvini	Aprilia	21	+1:09.288	16	
18	11	(Italy) Max Sabbatani	Honda	21	+1:11.898	25	
19	51	(Italy) Marco Petrini	Aprilia	21	+1:11.980	24	
20	98	(Japan) Masafumi Ono	Honda	21	+1:12.325	19	
21	35	(Germany) Reinhard Stolz	Honda	21	+1:38.513	27	
22	67	(Switzerland) Marco Tresoldi	Italjet	21	+1:52.521	29	
Ret	97	(Japan) Naoki Katoh	Honda	17	Accident	17	
Ret	41	(Japan) Youichi Ui	Derbi	13	Accident	3	
Ret	12	(France) Randy de Puniet	Aprilia	11	Retirement	23	
Ret	24	(United Kingdom) Leon Haslam	Italjet	10	Retirement	28	
Ret	34	(Andorra) Eric Bataille	Honda	1	Retirement	26	
Ret	95	(Japan) Nobuyuki Yunoki	Honda	0	Accident	9	
DSQ	9	(Italy) Lucio Cecchinello	Honda	21	(+17.692)	2	
DNS	32	(Italy) Mirko Giansanti	Honda		Did not start		
DNS	53	(San Marino) William de Angelis	Aprilia		Did not start		

== Championship standings after the race (500cc) ==
Below are the standings for the top five riders and constructors after round fifteen has concluded.

Riders' Championship standings

Pos.	Rider	Points
1	(United States) Kenny Roberts Jr.	249
2	(Italy) Valentino Rossi	193
3	(Spain) Carlos Checa	155
4	(Australia) Garry McCoy	150
5	(Brazil) Alex Barros	150

Constructors' Championship standings

Pos.	Constructor	Points
1	(Japan) Yamaha	293
2	(Japan) Honda	291
3	(Japan) Suzuki	255
4	(Italy) Aprilia	86
5	(Japan) TSR-Honda	81

- Note: Only the top five positions are included for both sets of standings.

Previous race: 2000 Rio de Janeiro Grand Prix	FIM Grand Prix World Championship; 2000 season	Next race: 2000 Australian Grand Prix
Previous race: none	Pacific Grand Prix	Next race: 2001 Pacific Grand Prix
