= 2000 Australian motorcycle Grand Prix =

(Australia) 2000 Australian Grand Prix
Race details
- Race 16 of 16 races in the 2000 Grand Prix motorcycle racing season
- Date: 29 October 2000
- Official name: Qantas Australian Grand Prix
- Location: Phillip Island
- Course: Permanent racing facility; 4.448 km (2.764 mi)

500cc
Pole position
- Rider: (United Kingdom) Jeremy McWilliams
- Time: 1:32.552
Fastest lap
- Rider: (Italy) Max Biaggi
- Time: 1:33.320 on lap 16
Podium
- First: (Italy) Max Biaggi
- Second: (Italy) Loris Capirossi
- Third: (Italy) Valentino Rossi

250cc
Pole position
- Rider: (Japan) Shinya Nakano
- Time: 1:33.713
Fastest lap
- Rider: (France) Olivier Jacque
- Time: 1:33.784 on lap 9
Podium
- First: (France) Olivier Jacque
- Second: (Japan) Shinya Nakano
- Third: (Japan) Daijiro Kato

125cc
Pole position
- Rider: (Italy) Roberto Locatelli
- Time: 1:38.296
Fastest lap
- Rider: (Japan) Masao Azuma
- Time: 1:38.877 on lap 22
Podium
- First: (Japan) Masao Azuma
- Second: (Japan) Youichi Ui
- Third: (Japan) Noboru Ueda

The 2000 Australian motorcycle Grand Prix was the last round of the 2000 Grand Prix motorcycle racing season. It took place on 29 October 2000 at the Phillip Island Grand Prix Circuit.

== 500 cc classification ==
Pos.	No.	Rider	Team	Manufacturer	Laps	Time/Retired	Grid	Points
1	4	(Italy) Max Biaggi	Marlboro Yamaha Team	Yamaha	27	42:29.792	12	25
2	65	(Italy) Loris Capirossi	Emerson Honda Pons	Honda	27	+0.182	5	20
3	46	(Italy) Valentino Rossi	Nastro Azzurro Honda	Honda	27	+0.288	8	16
4	10	(Brazil) Alex Barros	Emerson Honda Pons	Honda	27	+0.426	2	13
5	24	(Australia) Garry McCoy	Red Bull Yamaha WCM	Yamaha	27	+1.885	6	11
6	6	(Japan) Norick Abe	Antena 3 Yamaha d'Antin	Yamaha	27	+3.818	11	10
7	2	(United States) Kenny Roberts Jr.	Telefónica Movistar Suzuki	Suzuki	27	+3.846	4	9
8	99	(United Kingdom) Jeremy McWilliams	Blu Aprilia Team	Aprilia	27	+3.878	1	8
9	8	(Japan) Tadayuki Okada	Repsol YPF Honda Team	Honda	27	+4.308	10	7
10	9	(Japan) Nobuatsu Aoki	Telefónica Movistar Suzuki	Suzuki	27	+12.582	13	6
11	55	(France) Régis Laconi	Red Bull Yamaha WCM	Yamaha	27	+15.939	3	5
12	17	(Netherlands) Jurgen van den Goorbergh	Rizla Honda	TSR-Honda	27	+40.420	17	4
13	56	(Japan) Tekkyu Kayoh	Tecmas Honda Elf	Honda	27	+1:06.159	15	3
14	31	(Japan) Tetsuya Harada	Blu Aprilia Team	Aprilia	27	+1:15.267	19	2
15	15	(Japan) Yoshiteru Konishi	FCC TSR	TSR-Honda	26	+1 lap	18	1
Ret	5	(Spain) Sete Gibernau	Repsol YPF Honda Team	Honda	20	Retirement	14	
Ret	7	(Spain) Carlos Checa	Marlboro Yamaha Team	Yamaha	10	Accident	7	
Ret	68	(Australia) Mark Willis	Proton Team KR	Modenas KR3	7	Retirement	16	
Ret	33	(Spain) David Tomás	Sabre Sport	Honda	6	Retirement	20	
Ret	1	(Spain) Àlex Crivillé	Repsol YPF Honda Team	Honda	3	Accident	9	
DNQ	25	(Spain) José Luis Cardoso	Maxon Dee Cee Jeans	Honda		Did not qualify		
DNQ	36	(New Zealand) Stephen Briggs	BSL	BSL		Did not qualify		

== 250 cc classification ==
Pos.	No.	Rider	Manufacturer	Laps	Time/Retired	Grid	Points
1	19	(France) Olivier Jacque	Yamaha	25	39:19.795	2	25
2	56	(Japan) Shinya Nakano	Yamaha	25	+0.014	1	20
3	74	(Japan) Daijiro Kato	Honda	25	+14.525	3	16
4	6	(Germany) Ralf Waldmann	Aprilia	25	+14.556	5	13
5	35	(Italy) Marco Melandri	Aprilia	25	+30.945	4	11
6	4	(Japan) Tohru Ukawa	Honda	25	+49.942	6	10
7	14	(Australia) Anthony West	Honda	25	+59.116	15	9
8	24	(United Kingdom) Jason Vincent	Aprilia	25	+59.170	9	8
9	10	(Spain) Fonsi Nieto	Yamaha	25	+59.563	8	7
10	44	(Italy) Roberto Rolfo	Aprilia	25	+59.588	17	6
11	9	(Argentina) Sebastián Porto	Yamaha	25	+59.677	10	5
12	8	(Japan) Naoki Matsudo	Yamaha	25	+59.692	23	4
13	25	(France) Vincent Philippe	TSR-Honda	25	+1:08.252	19	3
14	23	(France) Julien Allemand	Yamaha	25	+1:11.768	12	2
15	37	(Italy) Luca Boscoscuro	Aprilia	25	+1:20.888	20	1
16	11	(Italy) Ivan Clementi	Aprilia	25	+1:20.965	27	
17	16	(Sweden) Johan Stigefelt	TSR-Honda	25	+1:21.234	18	
18	30	(Spain) Alex Debón	Aprilia	25	+1:24.803	7	
19	18	(Malaysia) Shahrol Yuzy	Yamaha	25	+1:33.561	13	
20	42	(Spain) David Checa	TSR-Honda	25	+1:33.618	11	
21	31	(Spain) Lucas Oliver	Yamaha	25	+1:36.630	24	
22	41	(Netherlands) Jarno Janssen	TSR-Honda	24	+1 lap	22	
Ret	91	(Australia) Shaun Geronimi	Yamaha	19	Retirement	26	
Ret	22	(France) Sébastien Gimbert	TSR-Honda	8	Retirement	25	
Ret	93	(Australia) Terry Carter	Yamaha	5	Retirement	28	
Ret	15	(United Kingdom) Adrian Coates	Aprilia	3	Accident	14	
Ret	20	(Spain) Jerónimo Vidal	Aprilia	3	Retirement	21	
DNS	21	(Italy) Franco Battaini	Aprilia	0	Did not start	16	
DNS	77	(United Kingdom) Jamie Robinson	Aprilia		Did not start		
DNS	26	(Germany) Klaus Nöhles	Aprilia		Did not start		
DNQ	92	(Australia) Jason Boyle	Honda		Did not qualify		
DNQ	94	(Australia) Steven Torresi	Yamaha		Did not qualify		

== 125 cc classification ==
Pos.	No.	Rider	Manufacturer	Laps	Time/Retired	Grid	Points
1	3	(Japan) Masao Azuma	Honda	23	38:15.366	5	25
2	41	(Japan) Youichi Ui	Derbi	23	+0.622	2	20
3	5	(Japan) Noboru Ueda	Honda	23	+4.088	7	16
4	1	(Spain) Emilio Alzamora	Honda	23	+4.170	9	13
5	54	(San Marino) Manuel Poggiali	Derbi	23	+5.697	12	11
6	15	(San Marino) Alex de Angelis	Honda	23	+15.596	13	10
7	17	(Germany) Steve Jenkner	Honda	23	+15.597	14	9
8	26	(Italy) Ivan Goi	Honda	23	+23.402	15	8
9	23	(Italy) Gino Borsoi	Aprilia	23	+32.204	11	7
10	16	(Italy) Simone Sanna	Aprilia	23	+33.961	6	6
11	29	(Spain) Ángel Nieto Jr.	Honda	23	+42.276	16	5
12	18	(Spain) Antonio Elías	Honda	23	+42.378	18	4
13	12	(France) Randy de Puniet	Aprilia	23	+42.700	20	3
14	22	(Spain) Pablo Nieto	Derbi	23	+43.206	10	2
15	39	(Czech Republic) Jaroslav Huleš	Aprilia	23	+1:07.361	21	1
16	35	(Germany) Reinhard Stolz	Honda	23	+1:19.126	22	
17	24	(United Kingdom) Leon Haslam	Italjet	23	+1:24.320	27	
18	92	(Australia) Josh Brookes	Honda	23	+1:35.650	19	
19	34	(Andorra) Eric Bataille	Honda	23	+1:38.754	24	
20	33	(Italy) Stefano Bianco	Honda	22	+1 lap	29	
Ret	91	(Australia) Jay Taylor	Honda	20	Retirement	28	
Ret	53	(San Marino) William de Angelis	Aprilia	18	Retirement	26	
Ret	21	(France) Arnaud Vincent	Aprilia	17	Retirement	8	
Ret	9	(Italy) Lucio Cecchinello	Honda	15	Accident	4	
Ret	94	(Australia) Michael Teniswood	Honda	15	Retirement	23	
Ret	67	(Switzerland) Marco Tresoldi	Italjet	14	Retirement	25	
Ret	11	(Italy) Max Sabbatani	Honda	10	Retirement	17	
Ret	4	(Italy) Roberto Locatelli	Aprilia	6	Accident	1	
Ret	8	(Italy) Gianluigi Scalvini	Aprilia	2	Retirement	3	

== Championship standings after the race (500cc) ==
Below are the standings for the top five riders and constructors after round sixteen has concluded.

Riders' Championship standings

Pos.	Rider	Points
1	(United States) Kenny Roberts Jr.	258
2	(Italy) Valentino Rossi	209
3	(Italy) Max Biaggi	170
4	(Brazil) Alex Barros	163
5	(Australia) Garry McCoy	161

Constructors' Championship standings

Pos.	Constructor	Points
1	(Japan) Yamaha	318
2	(Japan) Honda	311
3	(Japan) Suzuki	264
4	(Italy) Aprilia	94
5	(Japan) TSR-Honda	85

- Note: Only the top five positions are included for both sets of standings.

Previous race: 2000 Pacific Grand Prix	FIM Grand Prix World Championship; 2000 season	Next race: 2001 Japanese Grand Prix
Previous race: 1999 Australian Grand Prix	Australian Grand Prix	Next race: 2001 Australian Grand Prix
