= Jurgen van den Goorbergh =

Dutch motorcycle racer

- Nationality: Dutch
Motorcycle racing career statistics
Grand Prix motorcycle racing
Active years	1991 - 2002, 2005
First race	1991 250cc French Grand Prix
Last race	2005 Moto GP French Grand Prix
Team(s)	MuZ, Team Roberts, Kanemoto
Championships	0
Starts / Wins / Podiums / Poles / F. laps / Points; 165 / 0 / 0 / 2 / 0 / 466

Jurgen van den Goorbergh (born 29 December 1969) is a Dutch former professional motorcycle road racer also known as The Flying Dutchman. His son, Zonta van den Goorbergh, is also a motorcycle racer and currently competes in Moto2.

== Career ==
Born in Breda, Netherlands, van den Goorbergh won the Dutch 250cc Road Racing Championship in 1991. He began his Grand Prix career in 1991 in the 250cc class. In 1997, he moved up to the 500cc class racing a privately sponsored Honda. MuZ hired him to race for them in the 1999 season. In this season, he surprised by taking two pole positions, one at the Circuit de Barcelona-Catalunya and one in Brno. He raced with Mollenaar Racing in 2000 and in 2001 raced with the team of Kenny Roberts-Proton. The 2002 season did not start off well for van den Goorbergh, scoring only 21 points in first ten races. At the end of season, he made his best result in Australian Grand Prix, finished on fifth place only three hundredth of a second behind third Tohru Ukawa.

From 2003 to 2005, van den Goorbergh raced in the Supersport World Championship. He is considered an expert in wet racing. In the wet 2005 Chinese Grand Prix at Shanghai, van den Goorbergh substituted for the injured Makoto Tamada. He began from in 19th position and finished a respectable sixth place for the Konica Minolta Honda team.

In 2006 and 2007, van den Goorbergh did not join a road racing team, but tested MotoGP tyres for Michelin. He raced in the European Enduro Championship, the Dutch Trial Championship and in Supermoto competitions. He competed in the Dakar Rally for the first time in 2009, finishing 17th and best rookie that year. In 2010, van den Goorbergh competed in Dakar again, this time with a buggy and did not finish. Van den Goorbergh also competed in several events that year and was preparing himself for the 2011 Dakar, again with a buggy.

== Motorcycle Grand Prix career results ==
=== Races by year ===
(key) (Races in bold indicate pole position)

Year	Class	Team	Machine	1	2	3	4	5	6	7	8	9	10	11	12	13	14	15	16	17	Pts	Pos	Wins
1991	250cc	VD Goorbergh-Aprilia	RSV250	JPN	AUS	USA	SPA	ITA	GER	AUT	EUR	NED	FRA; 18	GBR	RSM; 14	CZE; 18	VDM	MAL			2	37th	0
1992	250cc	VD Goorbergh-Aprilia	RSV250	JPN; 20	AUS; 16	MAL; 13	SPA; 14	ITA; 14	EUR; Ret	GER; Ret	NED; 10	HUN; 18	FRA; 10	GBR; Ret	BRA; 17	RSA; 16					2	23rd	0
1993	250cc	VD Goorbergh-Aprilia	RSV250	AUS; 17	MAL; 20	JPN; 19	SPA; 23	AUT; 20	GER; Ret	NED; 15	EUR; Ret	RSM; Ret	GBR; 22	CZE; 18	ITA; Ret	USA; Inj	FIM; Ret				1	32nd	0
1994	250cc	VD Goorbergh-Aprilia	RSV250	AUS; 16	MAL; Ret	JPN; 12	SPA; 12	AUT; 9	GER; Ret	NED; 9	ITA; 16	FRA; Ret	GBR; 16	CZE; Ret	USA; 14	ARG; Ret	EUR; 17				24	17th	0
1995	250cc	Maxell Team Global-Honda	RS250	AUS; 11	MAL; 11	JPN; 10	SPA; 19	GER; 12	ITA; Ret	NED; 6	FRA; 14	GBR; 7	CZE; Ret	BRA; Ret	ARG; 9	EUR; 14					50	12th	0
1996	250cc	MQP Racing-Honda	RS250	MAL; 8	INA; 12	JPN; Ret	SPA; Ret	ITA; 15	FRA; 12	NED; 4	GER; Ret	GBR; Ret	AUT; 8	CZE; 17	IMO; 8	CAT; 14	BRA; 13	AUS; 11			56	11th	0
1997	500cc	Millar MQP-Honda	NSR500V	MAL; 15	JPN; 15	SPA; 14	ITA; Ret	AUT; Ret	FRA; 15	NED; Ret	IMO; Ret	GER; 11	BRA; 11	GBR; 13	CZE; 11	CAT; 14	INA; Ret	AUS; 12			29	19th	0
1998	500cc	Dee Cee Jeans-Honda	NSR500V	JPN; Ret	MAL; 8	SPA; 18	ITA; 16	FRA; 15	MAD; Ret	NED; 10	GBR; 9	GER; 8	CZE; 16	IMO; Ret	CAT; 13	AUS; 11	ARG; 14				40	15th	0
1999	500cc	MuZ-Weber	MuZ 500	MAL; Ret	JPN; Ret	SPA; 11	FRA; Ret	ITA; Ret	**CAT**; 8	NED; 13	GBR; Ret	GER; 12	**CZE**; 11	IMO; 14	VAL; Ret	AUS; 12	RSA; 13	BRA; Ret	ARG; 10		40	16th	0
2000	500cc	TSR-Honda	NSR500V	RSA; 10	MAL; 11	JPN; 13	SPA; 9	FRA; 13	ITA; 11	CAT; 7	NED; 9	GBR; 5	GER; Ret	CZE; 12	POR; 8	VAL; 10	BRA; 10	PAC; 15	AUS; 12		85	13th	0
2001	500cc	Roberts-Proton	KR3	JPN; 11	RSA; 11	SPA; 13	FRA; 10	ITA; 12	CAT; 9	NED; 9	GBR; 12	GER; 14	CZE; Ret	POR; 7	VAL; 9	PAC; Ret	AUS; 10	MAL; DNS	BRA; Ret		65	13th	0
2002	MotoGP	Kanemoto-Honda	NSR500	JPN; Ret	RSA; 11	SPA; 12	FRA; 15	ITA; 14	CAT; Ret	NED; 10	GBR; 15	GER; 14	CZE; Ret	POR; 7	BRA; 9	PAC; 13	MAL; 13	AUS; 5	VAL; 7		60	13th	0
2005	MotoGP	Konica Minolta-Honda	RC211V	SPA	POR	CHN; 6	FRA; 14	ITA	CAT	NED	USA	GBR	GER	CZE	JPN	MAL	QAT	AUS	TUR	VAL	12	20th	0
