= Imre Tóth (motorcyclist) =

Hungarian motorcycle racer

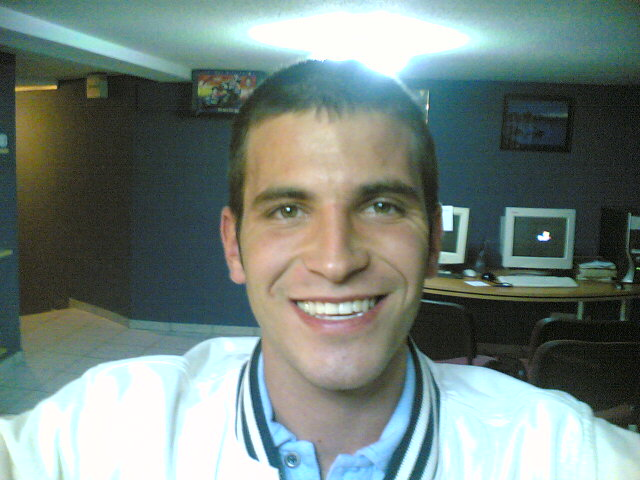
- Imre Tóth
- Nationality: (Hungary) Hungarian
- Born: 6 September 1985 (age 41); Budapest, Hungary
- Current team: Team Tóth
- Bike number: 10
- Website: tothimi.com
Motorcycle racing career statistics
250cc World Championship
Active years	2007–2009
Manufacturers	Aprilia
Championships	0
2009 championship position	22nd (12 pts)
Starts / Wins / Podiums / Poles / F. laps / Points; 58 / 0 / 0 / 0 / 0 / 23
125cc World Championship
Active years	2002–2006
Manufacturers	Honda, Aprilia
Championships	0
2006 championship position	NC (0 pts)
Starts / Wins / Podiums / Poles / F. laps / Points; 80 / 0 / 0 / 0 / 0 / 13
Superbike World Championship
Active years	2014-2016
Manufacturers	BMW, Yamaha
Championships	0
2016 championship position	NC (0 pts)
Starts / Wins / Podiums / Poles / F. laps / Points; 56 / 0 / 0 / 0 / 0 / 12
Supersport World Championship
Active years	2010–2013
Manufacturers	Honda
Championships	0
2013 championship position	NC (0 pts)
Starts / Wins / Podiums / Poles / F. laps / Points; 36 / 0 / 0 / 0 / 0 / 34

Imre "Imi" Tóth (born 6 September 1985 in Budapest, Hungary) is a motorcycle racer who competed for 8 years in Grand Prix motorcycle racing in the 125cc the 250cc World Championships as a privateer. He last raced in the Superbike World Championship aboard a Yamaha YZF-R1. He previously raced in the Supersport World Championship. He now owns a Supersport team called Team Tóth, which started operating when he was in 125cc (he competed as a private his entire career). He is not related to László Tóth.

== Early life ==
Tóth started his racing career in 1989 on an electric bike. The next year, he continued on a 50cc automatic LEM bike, with which he won his first race in 1991.

== Early career ==
Tóth became Hungarian champion in 1992 and 1993 with Honda QR bike in the 50cc automatic category. Then in 1994, he was inaugurated to win the championship in the 50cc stick shift category.

The next step was an 80cc CASAL bike, then raced with a Honda 125cc bike, in age ten and a half, with special permission, in the Czech Republic and Croatia. In Hungary, Tóth was not permitted to start due to his young age.

At the age of 12, Tóth became champion as the youngest rider in Slovakia.

Tóth then finished second in the Alpok-Adria tournament in year 1997.

In the Alpok-Adria tournament Tóth couldn't have participated, as the Italian regulation only allows riders from the age of fourteen onwards, but the race director permitted him to race, after checking his training results. Finishing at the seventh place, he received a special award for being the youngest rider in Italy.

After receiving the permission to race in Hungary at the age of 12, Tóth became the youngest Hungarian and international champion in the motorcycle racing history by winning the Hungarian Championship.

Finally, when he turned 14, Tóth received he gained the permission to compete in European races from the European Motorcycle Union.

== Career statistics ==
=== Grand Prix motorcycle racing ===
==== By season ====
Season	Class	Team	Number	Motorcycle	Race	Win	Podium	Pole	FLap	Points	Placed
2002	125cc	Semprucci Angaia Racing	20	Honda	16	0	0	0	0	0	–
2003	125cc	Team Hungary	25	Honda Seel	16	0	0	0	0	0	–
2004	125cc	Team Hungary	25	Aprilia	16	0	0	0	0	6	29th
2005	125cc	Road Racing Team Hungary	45	Aprilia	16	0	0	0	0	7	28th
2006	125cc	Team Tóth	45	Aprilia	16	0	0	0	0	0	–
2007	250cc	Team Tóth Aprilia	10	Aprilia	17	0	0	0	0	2	28th
2008	250cc	Team Tóth Aprilia	10	Aprilia	16	0	0	0	0	9	20th
2009	250cc	Team Tóth Aprilia	10	Aprilia	16	0	0	0	0	12	22nd
Best						0	0	0	0	12	20th
Total					114	0	0	0	0	24	

==== Races by year ====
(key)

Year	Class	Team	1	2	3	4	5	6	7	8	9	10	11	12	13	14	15	16	17	Pos.	Pts
2002	125cc	Honda	JPN; 18	RSA; 23	SPA; 27	FRA; 22	ITA; 21	CAT; 23	NED; 27	GBR; 20	GER; 25	CZE; 26	POR; Ret	BRA; 28	PAC; 23	MAL; 22	AUS; 23	VAL; 25		NC	0
2003	125cc	Honda	JPN; 24	RSA; Ret	SPA; 26	FRA; 23	ITA; 27	CAT; 20	NED; 23	GBR; 17	GER; Ret	CZE; 23	POR; Ret	BRA; Ret	PAC; 26	MAL; 24	AUS; Ret	VAL; 22		NC	0
2004	125cc	Aprilia	RSA; 22	SPA; 26	FRA; 21	ITA; 16	CAT; 19	NED; 10	BRA; 18	GER; Ret	GBR; 19	CZE; Ret	POR; Ret	JPN; Ret	QAT; 25	MAL; 18	AUS; 21	VAL; 21		29th	6
2005	125cc	Aprilia	SPA; 16	POR; 22	CHN; 30	FRA; 9	ITA; 25	CAT; Ret	NED; 25	GBR; 26	GER; 20	CZE; 18	JPN; 21	MAL; 22	QAT; 29	AUS; Ret	TUR; 24	VAL; 21		27th	7
2006	125cc	Aprilia	SPA; 26	QAT; Ret	TUR; 29	CHN; 32	FRA; 20	ITA; 25	CAT; 27	NED; 29	GBR; Ret	GER; 27	CZE; 20	MAL; 23	AUS; Ret	JPN; 25	POR; 18	VAL; 33		NC	0
2007	250cc	Aprilia	QAT; 19	SPA; 18	TUR; Ret	CHN; 18	FRA; Ret	ITA; 22	CAT; 22	GBR; 15	NED; 22	GER; Ret	CZE; 19	RSM; 17	POR; 15	JPN; 18	AUS; Ret	MAL; 21	VAL; 23	28th	2
2008	250cc	Aprilia	QAT; Ret	SPA; 15	POR; 18	CHN; 16	FRA; 18	ITA; 15	CAT; Ret	GBR; Ret	NED; 20	GER; 17	CZE	RSM; Ret	INP; C	JPN; 22	AUS; 13	MAL; 15	VAL; 13	20th	9
2009	250cc	Aprilia	QAT; 17	JPN; 13	SPA; 16	FRA; 9	ITA; 15	CAT; Ret	NED; 15	GER; 18	GBR; 17	CZE; 17	INP; 17	RSM; 18	POR; 18	AUS; 18	MAL; Ret	VAL; 19		22nd	12

=== Supersport World Championship ===
==== Races by year ====
Year	Make	1	2	3	4	5	6	7	8	9	10	11	12	13	Pos.	Pts
2010	Honda	AUS	POR	SPA	NED; 16	ITA; 16	RSA	USA	SMR; 19	CZE; 19	GBR; 23	GER; 14	ITA; Ret	FRA; Ret	37th	2
2011	Honda	AUS; 15	EUR; 16	NED; 11	ITA; Ret	SMR; 20	SPA; 15	CZE; 13	GBR; 17	GER; 14	ITA; 15	FRA; 20	POR; Ret		19th	13
2012	Honda	AUS; 18	ITA; Ret	NED; 16	ITA; 4	EUR; Ret	SMR; 13	SPA; Ret	CZE; 19	GBR; 17	RUS; 24	GER; 20	POR; 20	FRA; 13	20th	19
2013	Honda	AUS; 22	SPA; Ret	NED	ITA; 23	GBR; 26	POR; 23	ITA; 17	RUS; C	GBR; 21	GER; 25	TUR; 23	FRA; 21	SPA; 24	NC	0

=== World Superbike Championship ===
==== Races by year ====
Year	Make	1		2		3		4		5		6		7		8		9		10		11		12		13		Pos.	Pts
Year	Make	R1	R2	R1	R2	R1	R2	R1	R2	R1	R2	R1	R2	R1	R2	R1	R2	R1	R2	R1	R2	R1	R2	R1	R2	R1	R2	Pos.	Pts
2014	BMW	AUS; 16	AUS; 19	SPA; 18	SPA; 17	NED; 20	NED; 16	ITA; 20	ITA; 19	GBR; 18	GBR; 20	MAL; 14	MAL; 18	SMR; DNS	SMR; DNS	POR	POR	USA	USA	SPA; 18	SPA; Ret	FRA; 20	FRA; 13	QAT; 18	QAT; 17			28th	5
2015	BMW	AUS; 20	AUS; 17	THA; 18	THA; 18	SPA; 18	SPA; 20	NED; Ret	NED; Ret	ITA; 15	ITA; 12	GBR; 19	GBR; 17	POR; 20	POR; 19	SMR; 22	SMR; 22	USA; 16	USA; 17	MAL; 19	MAL; 20	SPA; 20	SPA; 20	FRA; 20	FRA; 21	QAT; 17	QAT; 14	30th	7
2016	Yamaha	AUS; 19	AUS; 19	THA; 22	THA; 21	SPA; 20	SPA; 22	NED	NED	ITA	ITA	MAL; 19	MAL; 21	GBR; 18	GBR; Ret	ITA	ITA	USA	USA	GER	GER	FRA; Ret	FRA; 21	SPA	SPA	QAT	QAT	NC	0

* Season still in progress.
