= 2002 Portuguese motorcycle Grand Prix =

(Portugal) 2002 Portuguese Grand Prix
Race details
- Race 11 of 16 races in the 2002 Grand Prix motorcycle racing season
- Date: 8 September 2002
- Official name: Grande Prémio Marlboro de Portugal
- Location: Autódromo do Estoril
- Course: Permanent racing facility; 4.182 km (2.599 mi)

MotoGP
Pole position
Rider	(Spain) Carlos Checa	Yamaha
Time	1:39.793	
Fastest lap
Rider	(Italy) Valentino Rossi	Honda
Time	1:52.302 on lap 24	
Podium
First	(Italy) Valentino Rossi	Honda
Second	(Spain) Carlos Checa	Yamaha
Third	(Japan) Tohru Ukawa	Honda

250cc
Pole position
Rider	(Argentina) Sebastián Porto	Yamaha
Time	1:41.708	
Fastest lap
Rider	(Spain) Fonsi Nieto	Aprilia
Time	2:00.120 on lap 15	
Podium
First	(Spain) Fonsi Nieto	Aprilia
Second	(Italy) Marco Melandri	Aprilia
Third	(Argentina) Sebastián Porto	Yamaha

125cc
Pole position
Rider	(Spain) Daniel Pedrosa	Honda
Time	1:46.664	
Fastest lap
Rider	(Germany) Steve Jenkner	Aprilia
Time	2:01.050 on lap 8	
Podium
First	(France) Arnaud Vincent	Aprilia
Second	(Italy) Simone Sanna	Aprilia
Third	(Germany) Steve Jenkner	Aprilia

The 2002 Portuguese motorcycle Grand Prix was the eleventh round of the 2002 MotoGP Championship. It took place on the weekend of 6–8 September 2002 at the Autódromo do Estoril.

== MotoGP classification ==
Pos.	No.	Rider	Team	Manufacturer	Laps	Time/Retired	Grid	Points
1	46	(Italy) Valentino Rossi	Repsol Honda Team	Honda	28	54:12.962	3	25
2	7	(Spain) Carlos Checa	Marlboro Yamaha Team	Yamaha	28	+22.200	1	20
3	11	(Japan) Tohru Ukawa	Repsol Honda Team	Honda	28	+24.220	8	16
4	10	(United States) Kenny Roberts Jr.	Telefónica Movistar Suzuki	Suzuki	28	+40.832	12	13
5	4	(Brazil) Alex Barros	West Honda Pons	Honda	28	+42.709	4	11
6	3	(Italy) Max Biaggi	Marlboro Yamaha Team	Yamaha	28	+44.064	5	10
7	6	(Japan) Norifumi Abe	Antena 3 Yamaha d'Antín	Yamaha	28	+1:49.012	13	9
8	21	(United States) John Hopkins	Red Bull Yamaha WCM	Yamaha	28	+2:03.101	15	8
9	99	(United Kingdom) Jeremy McWilliams	Proton Team KR	Proton KR	27	+1 lap	6	7
10	31	(Japan) Tetsuya Harada	Pramac Honda Racing Team	Honda	27	+1 lap	18	6
11	8	(Australia) Garry McCoy	Red Bull Yamaha WCM	Yamaha	27	+1 lap	16	5
12	56	(Japan) Shinya Nakano	Gauloises Yamaha Tech 3	Yamaha	27	+1 lap	17	4
Ret (13)	15	(Spain) Sete Gibernau	Telefónica Movistar Suzuki	Suzuki	24	Accident	9	
Ret (14)	74	(Japan) Daijiro Kato	Fortuna Honda Gresini	Honda	7	Accident	2	
Ret (15)	65	(Italy) Loris Capirossi	West Honda Pons	Honda	6	Accident	7	
Ret (16)	55	(France) Régis Laconi	MS Aprilia Racing	Aprilia	3	Accident	14	
Ret (17)	9	(Japan) Nobuatsu Aoki	Proton Team KR	Proton KR	2	Retirement	11	
Ret (18)	17	(Netherlands) Jurgen van den Goorbergh	Kanemoto Racing	Honda	2	Retirement	10	
Ret (19)	19	(France) Olivier Jacque	Gauloises Yamaha Tech 3	Yamaha	0	Accident	19	
Ret (20)	20	(Spain) Pere Riba	Antena 3 Yamaha d'Antín	Yamaha	0	Accident	20	

== 250 cc classification ==
Pos.	No.	Rider	Manufacturer	Laps	Time/Retired	Grid	Points
1	10	(Spain) Fonsi Nieto	Aprilia	26	53:58.901	3	25
2	3	(Italy) Marco Melandri	Aprilia	26	+0.684	2	20
3	9	(Argentina) Sebastián Porto	Yamaha	26	+7.342	1	16
4	4	(Italy) Roberto Rolfo	Honda	26	+23.576	4	13
5	15	(Italy) Roberto Locatelli	Aprilia	26	+49.234	11	11
6	7	(Spain) Emilio Alzamora	Honda	26	+1:00.628	7	10
7	19	(United Kingdom) Leon Haslam	Honda	26	+1:36.634	14	9
8	42	(Spain) David Checa	Aprilia	26	+1:39.550	19	8
9	28	(Germany) Dirk Heidolf	Aprilia	26	+2:12.740	21	7
10	32	(Spain) Héctor Faubel	Aprilia	25	+1 lap	22	6
11	22	(Spain) Raúl Jara	Aprilia	25	+1 lap	23	5
12	36	(France) Erwan Nigon	Aprilia	25	+1 lap	20	4
13	24	(Spain) Toni Elías	Aprilia	23	+3 laps	6	3
Ret (14)	57	(France) Grégory Lefort	Aprilia	23	Retirement	24	
Ret (15)	18	(Malaysia) Shahrol Yuzy	Yamaha	22	Accident	12	
Ret (16)	8	(Japan) Naoki Matsudo	Yamaha	21	Accident	8	
Ret (17)	21	(Italy) Franco Battaini	Aprilia	20	Retirement	5	
Ret (18)	27	(Australia) Casey Stoner	Aprilia	19	Retirement	13	
Ret (19)	11	(Japan) Haruchika Aoki	Honda	17	Retirement	15	
Ret (20)	12	(United Kingdom) Jay Vincent	Honda	17	Retirement	18	
Ret (21)	34	(France) Eric Bataille	Honda	7	Accident	17	
Ret (22)	6	(Spain) Alex Debón	Aprilia	6	Retirement	10	
Ret (23)	13	(Czech Republic) Jaroslav Huleš	Yamaha	2	Accident	16	
Ret (24)	17	(France) Randy de Puniet	Aprilia	0	Retirement	9	
DNQ	30	(Netherlands) Rob Filart	Honda		Did not qualify		

== 125 cc classification ==
Pos.	No.	Rider	Manufacturer	Laps	Time/Retired	Grid	Points
1	21	(France) Arnaud Vincent	Aprilia	24	49:05.300	9	25
2	16	(Italy) Simone Sanna	Aprilia	24	+0.867	6	20
3	17	(Germany) Steve Jenkner	Aprilia	24	+2.600	4	16
4	22	(Spain) Pablo Nieto	Aprilia	24	+48.520	21	13
5	5	(Japan) Masao Azuma	Honda	24	+57.972	20	11
6	4	(Italy) Lucio Cecchinello	Aprilia	24	+1:10.035	8	10
7	23	(Italy) Gino Borsoi	Aprilia	24	+1:14.682	15	9
8	36	(Finland) Mika Kallio	Honda	24	+1:27.994	5	8
9	77	(Switzerland) Thomas Lüthi	Honda	24	+1:39.443	29	7
10	26	(Spain) Daniel Pedrosa	Honda	24	+1:50.519	1	6
11	57	(United Kingdom) Chaz Davies	Aprilia	24	+1:54.525	30	5
12	42	(Italy) Christian Pistoni	Italjet	23	+1 lap	33	4
13	37	(Italy) Marco Simoncelli	Aprilia	23	+1 lap	32	3
14	52	(Spain) Julián Simón	Honda	23	+1 lap	27	2
Ret (15)	34	(Italy) Andrea Dovizioso	Honda	22	Accident	18	
Ret (16)	1	(San Marino) Manuel Poggiali	Gilera	20	Accident	2	
Ret (17)	33	(Italy) Stefano Bianco	Aprilia	20	Retirement	13	
Ret (18)	9	(Japan) Noboru Ueda	Honda	18	Accident	16	
Ret (19)	84	(Italy) Michel Fabrizio	Gilera	16	Accident	19	
Ret (20)	31	(Italy) Mattia Angeloni	Gilera	15	Accident	23	
Ret (21)	20	(Hungary) Imre Tóth	Honda	13	Accident	31	
Ret (22)	80	(Spain) Héctor Barberá	Aprilia	9	Accident	14	
Ret (23)	19	(Italy) Alex Baldolini	Aprilia	8	Accident	26	
Ret (24)	7	(Italy) Stefano Perugini	Italjet	7	Accident	28	
Ret (25)	8	(Hungary) Gábor Talmácsi	Honda	6	Accident	11	
Ret (26)	48	(Spain) Jorge Lorenzo	Derbi	6	Accident	25	
Ret (27)	50	(Italy) Andrea Ballerini	Honda	6	Accident	17	
Ret (28)	12	(Germany) Klaus Nöhles	Honda	6	Retirement	22	
Ret (29)	6	(Italy) Mirko Giansanti	Honda	4	Accident	7	
Ret (30)	15	(San Marino) Alex de Angelis	Aprilia	4	Accident	10	
Ret (31)	11	(Italy) Max Sabbatani	Aprilia	4	Retirement	24	
Ret (32)	41	(Japan) Youichi Ui	Derbi	3	Accident	3	
Ret (33)	25	(Spain) Joan Olivé	Honda	1	Accident	12	
DNQ	78	(Portugal) Pedro Monteiro	Honda		Did not qualify		
DNQ	79	(Portugal) João Pinto	Honda		Did not qualify		
DNQ	94	(Portugal) Filipe Costa	Yamaha		Did not qualify		

== Championship standings after the race (MotoGP) ==
Below are the standings for the top five riders and constructors after round eleven has concluded.

Riders' Championship standings

Pos.	Rider	Points
1	(Italy) Valentino Rossi	245
2	(Japan) Tohru Ukawa	156
3	(Italy) Max Biaggi	144
4	(Spain) Carlos Checa	116
5	(Brazil) Alex Barros	105

Constructors' Championship standings

Pos.	Constructor	Points
1	(Japan) Honda	270
2	(Japan) Yamaha	190
3	(Japan) Suzuki	99
4	(Malaysia) / (United States) Proton KR	64
5	(Italy) Aprilia	28

- Note: Only the top five positions are included for both sets of standings.

Previous race: 2002 Czech Republic Grand Prix	FIM Grand Prix World Championship; 2002 season	Next race: 2002 Rio de Janeiro Grand Prix
Previous race: 2001 Portuguese Grand Prix	Portuguese motorcycle Grand Prix	Next race: 2003 Portuguese Grand Prix
