= 2002 Rio de Janeiro motorcycle Grand Prix =

12th round of the 2002 MotoGP Championship

(Rio de Janeiro (state)) 2002 Rio de Janeiro Grand Prix
Race details
- Race 12 of 16 races in the 2002 Grand Prix motorcycle racing season
- Date: 22 September 2002
- Official name: Cinzano Rio Grand Prix
- Location: Autódromo Internacional Nelson Piquet
- Course: Permanent racing facility; 4.933 km (3.065 mi)

MotoGP
Pole position
Rider	(Italy) Max Biaggi	Yamaha
Time	1:50.568	
Fastest lap
Rider	(Spain) Carlos Checa	Yamaha
Time	1:59.827 on lap 11	
Podium
First	(Italy) Valentino Rossi	Honda
Second	(Italy) Max Biaggi	Yamaha
Third	(United States) Kenny Roberts Jr.	Suzuki

250cc
Pole position
Rider	(France) Randy de Puniet	Aprilia
Time	1:53.939	
Fastest lap
Rider	(Argentina) Sebastián Porto	Yamaha
Time	2:04.661 on lap 10	
Podium
First	(Argentina) Sebastián Porto	Yamaha
Second	(Italy) Roberto Rolfo	Honda
Third	(Italy) Franco Battaini	Aprilia

125cc
Pole position
Rider	(San Marino) Manuel Poggiali	Gilera
Time	1:57.888	
Fastest lap
Rider	(Japan) Masao Azuma	Honda
Time	2:10.065 on lap 17	
Podium
First	(Japan) Masao Azuma	Honda
Second	(France) Arnaud Vincent	Aprilia
Third	(San Marino) Manuel Poggiali	Gilera

The 2002 Rio de Janeiro motorcycle Grand Prix was the twelfth round of the 2002 MotoGP Championship. It took place on the weekend of 20–22 September 2002 at Autódromo Internacional Nelson Piquet.

== MotoGP classification ==
Pos.	No.	Rider	Team	Manufacturer	Laps	Time/Retired	Grid	Points
1	46	(Italy) Valentino Rossi	Repsol Honda Team	Honda	24	49:09.516	2	25
2	3	(Italy) Max Biaggi	Marlboro Yamaha Team	Yamaha	24	+1.674	1	20
3	10	(United States) Kenny Roberts Jr.	Telefónica Movistar Suzuki	Suzuki	24	+18.764	16	16
4	4	(Brazil) Alex Barros	West Honda Pons	Honda	24	+24.759	15	13
5	65	(Italy) Loris Capirossi	West Honda Pons	Honda	24	+32.354	12	11
6	6	(Japan) Norifumi Abe	Antena 3 Yamaha d'Antín	Yamaha	24	+34.360	11	10
7	19	(France) Olivier Jacque	Gauloises Yamaha Tech 3	Yamaha	24	+44.250	7	9
8	15	(Spain) Sete Gibernau	Telefónica Movistar Suzuki	Suzuki	24	+57.150	18	8
9	17	(Netherlands) Jurgen van den Goorbergh	Kanemoto Racing	Honda	24	+1:09.987	8	7
10	8	(Australia) Garry McCoy	Red Bull Yamaha WCM	Yamaha	24	+1:17.611	4	6
11	30	(Spain) José Luis Cardoso	Antena 3 Yamaha d'Antín	Yamaha	24	+1:20.837	20	5
12	9	(Japan) Nobuatsu Aoki	Proton Team KR	Proton KR	24	+1:50.774	10	4
13	31	(Japan) Tetsuya Harada	Pramac Honda Racing Team	Honda	23	+1 lap	19	3
14	21	(United States) John Hopkins	Red Bull Yamaha WCM	Yamaha	23	+1 lap	14	2
Ret (15)	55	(France) Régis Laconi	MS Aprilia Racing	Aprilia	22	Accident	17	
Ret (16)	7	(Spain) Carlos Checa	Marlboro Yamaha Team	Yamaha	16	Accident	5	
Ret (17)	99	(United Kingdom) Jeremy McWilliams	Proton Team KR	Proton KR	4	Accident	3	
Ret (18)	56	(Japan) Shinya Nakano	Gauloises Yamaha Tech 3	Yamaha	3	Accident	13	
Ret (19)	11	(Japan) Tohru Ukawa	Repsol Honda Team	Honda	1	Accident	9	
Ret (20)	74	(Japan) Daijiro Kato	Fortuna Honda Gresini	Honda	0	Accident	6	

== 250cc classification ==
Pos.	No.	Rider	Manufacturer	Laps	Time/Retired	Grid	Points
1	9	(Argentina) Sebastián Porto	Yamaha	22	47:01.307	2	25
2	4	(Italy) Roberto Rolfo	Honda	22	+14.114	9	20
3	21	(Italy) Franco Battaini	Aprilia	22	+15.812	10	16
4	3	(Italy) Marco Melandri	Aprilia	22	+26.998	4	13
5	24	(Spain) Toni Elías	Aprilia	22	+29.533	3	11
6	27	(Australia) Casey Stoner	Aprilia	22	+31.868	12	10
7	7	(Spain) Emilio Alzamora	Honda	22	+45.373	11	9
8	8	(Japan) Naoki Matsudo	Yamaha	22	+1:11.324	7	8
9	18	(Malaysia) Shahrol Yuzy	Yamaha	22	+1:13.787	13	7
10	19	(United Kingdom) Leon Haslam	Honda	22	+1:15.478	17	6
11	13	(Czech Republic) Jaroslav Huleš	Yamaha	22	+1:16.715	14	5
12	42	(Spain) David Checa	Aprilia	22	+1:50.844	18	4
13	36	(France) Erwan Nigon	Aprilia	22	+1:58.717	15	3
14	28	(Germany) Dirk Heidolf	Aprilia	22	+2:12.040	24	2
15	96	(Czech Republic) Jakub Smrž	Honda	21	+1 lap	23	1
16	22	(Spain) Raúl Jara	Aprilia	21	+1 lap	25	
17	32	(Spain) Héctor Faubel	Aprilia	21	+1 lap	22	
Ret (18)	10	(Spain) Fonsi Nieto	Aprilia	15	Accident	5	
Ret (19)	17	(France) Randy de Puniet	Aprilia	14	Accident	1	
Ret (20)	51	(France) Hugo Marchand	Aprilia	14	Accident	20	
Ret (21)	6	(Spain) Alex Debón	Aprilia	12	Accident	8	
Ret (22)	15	(Italy) Roberto Locatelli	Aprilia	12	Retirement	6	
Ret (23)	12	(United Kingdom) Jay Vincent	Honda	4	Accident	16	
Ret (24)	34	(France) Eric Bataille	Honda	1	Retirement	21	
Ret (25)	11	(Japan) Haruchika Aoki	Honda	1	Retirement	19	

== 125cc classification ==
Pos.	No.	Rider	Manufacturer	Laps	Time/Retired	Grid	Points
1	5	(Japan) Masao Azuma	Honda	21	46:28.675	18	25
2	21	(France) Arnaud Vincent	Aprilia	21	+1.705	2	20
3	1	(San Marino) Manuel Poggiali	Gilera	21	+1.760	1	16
4	8	(Hungary) Gábor Talmácsi	Honda	21	+9.177	3	13
5	22	(Spain) Pablo Nieto	Aprilia	21	+26.596	7	11
6	7	(Italy) Stefano Perugini	Italjet	21	+32.745	19	10
7	48	(Spain) Jorge Lorenzo	Derbi	21	+34.150	14	9
8	36	(Finland) Mika Kallio	Honda	21	+34.488	9	8
9	12	(Germany) Klaus Nöhles	Honda	21	+36.641	21	7
10	4	(Italy) Lucio Cecchinello	Aprilia	21	+40.381	5	6
11	15	(San Marino) Alex de Angelis	Aprilia	21	+40.615	4	5
12	23	(Italy) Gino Borsoi	Aprilia	21	+41.428	11	4
13	34	(Italy) Andrea Dovizioso	Honda	21	+41.608	17	3
14	16	(Italy) Simone Sanna	Aprilia	21	+41.630	15	2
15	80	(Spain) Héctor Barberá	Aprilia	21	+45.147	10	1
16	50	(Italy) Andrea Ballerini	Aprilia	21	+49.885	23	
17	33	(Italy) Stefano Bianco	Aprilia	21	+57.060	20	
18	17	(Germany) Steve Jenkner	Aprilia	21	+1:13.948	6	
19	42	(Italy) Christian Pistoni	Italjet	21	+1:14.061	30	
20	6	(Italy) Mirko Giansanti	Honda	21	+1:17.495	13	
21	37	(Italy) Marco Simoncelli	Aprilia	21	+1:23.540	25	
22	25	(Spain) Joan Olivé	Honda	21	+1:24.059	16	
23	84	(Italy) Michel Fabrizio	Gilera	21	+1:26.189	26	
24	77	(Switzerland) Thomas Lüthi	Honda	21	+1:29.225	24	
25	9	(Japan) Noboru Ueda	Honda	21	+1:32.402	22	
26	72	(Germany) Dario Giuseppetti	Honda	21	+1:45.091	31	
27	31	(Italy) Mattia Angeloni	Gilera	21	+1:52.619	29	
28	20	(Hungary) Imre Tóth	Honda	21	+2:01.551	27	
29	57	(United Kingdom) Chaz Davies	Aprilia	21	+2:04.263	28	
Ret (30)	41	(Japan) Youichi Ui	Derbi	12	Accident	12	
Ret (31)	26	(Spain) Daniel Pedrosa	Honda	2	Accident	8	
Ret (32)	19	(Italy) Alex Baldolini	Aprilia	1	Accident	32	

== Championship standings after the race (MotoGP) ==
Below are the standings for the top five riders and constructors after round twelve has concluded.

Riders' Championship standings

Pos.	Rider	Points
1	(Italy) Valentino Rossi	270
2	(Italy) Max Biaggi	164
3	(Japan) Tohru Ukawa	156
4	(Brazil) Alex Barros	118
5	(Spain) Carlos Checa	116

Constructors' Championship standings

Pos.	Constructor	Points
1	(Japan) Honda	295
2	(Japan) Yamaha	210
3	(Japan) Suzuki	115
4	(Malaysia) / (United States) Proton KR	68
5	(Italy) Aprilia	28

- Note: Only the top five positions are included for both sets of standings.

Previous race: 2002 Portuguese Grand Prix	FIM Grand Prix World Championship; 2002 season	Next race: 2002 Pacific Grand Prix
Previous race: 2001 Rio de Janeiro Grand Prix	Rio de Janeiro motorcycle Grand Prix	Next race: 2003 Rio de Janeiro Grand Prix
