= 1999 Australian motorcycle Grand Prix =

(Australia) 1999 Australian Grand Prix
Race details
- Race 13 of 16 races in the 1999 Grand Prix motorcycle racing season
- Date: 3 October 1999
- Official name: Qantas Australian Grand Prix
- Location: Phillip Island
- Course: Permanent racing facility; 4.448 km (2.764 mi)

500cc
Pole position
- Rider: (United States) Kenny Roberts Jr.
- Time: 1:32.319
Fastest lap
- Rider: (United States) Kenny Roberts Jr.
- Time: 1:32.743 on lap 7
Podium
- First: (Japan) Tadayuki Okada
- Second: (Italy) Max Biaggi
- Third: (France) Régis Laconi

250cc
Pole position
- Rider: (United Kingdom) Jeremy McWilliams
- Time: 1:33.919
Fastest lap
- Rider: (Italy) Valentino Rossi
- Time: 1:33.556 on lap 25
Podium
- First: (Italy) Valentino Rossi
- Second: (France) Olivier Jacque
- Third: (Japan) Tohru Ukawa

125cc
Pole position
- Rider: (Japan) Noboru Ueda
- Time: 1:38.600
Fastest lap
- Rider: (Italy) Marco Melandri
- Time: 1:38.118 on lap 21
Podium
- First: (Italy) Marco Melandri
- Second: (Italy) Lucio Cecchinello
- Third: (Japan) Youichi Ui

The 1999 Australian motorcycle Grand Prix was the thirteenth round of the 1999 Grand Prix motorcycle racing season. It took place on 3 October 1999 at the Phillip Island Grand Prix Circuit.

== 500 cc classification ==
| Pos. | No. | Rider | Team | Manufacturer | Laps | Time/Retired | Grid | Points |
|---|---|---|---|---|---|---|---|---|
| 1 | 8 | (Japan) Tadayuki Okada | Repsol Honda Team | Honda | 27 | 42:09.271 | 7 | 25 |
| 2 | 2 | (Italy) Max Biaggi | Marlboro Yamaha Team | Yamaha | 27 | +0.085 | 5 | 20 |
| 3 | 55 | (France) Régis Laconi | Red Bull Yamaha WCM | Yamaha | 27 | +0.124 | 3 | 16 |
| 4 | 4 | (Spain) Carlos Checa | Marlboro Yamaha Team | Yamaha | 27 | +9.497 | 10 | 13 |
| 5 | 3 | (Spain) Àlex Crivillé | Repsol Honda Team | Honda | 27 | +9.811 | 12 | 11 |
| 6 | 15 | (Spain) Sete Gibernau | Repsol Honda Team | Honda | 27 | +10.691 | 6 | 10 |
| 7 | 24 | (Australia) Garry McCoy | Red Bull Yamaha WCM | Yamaha | 27 | +12.135 | 15 | 9 |
| 8 | 9 | (Japan) Nobuatsu Aoki | Suzuki Grand Prix Team | Suzuki | 27 | +25.028 | 11 | 8 |
| 9 | 19 | (United States) John Kocinski | Kanemoto Nettaxi Honda | Honda | 27 | +25.219 | 14 | 7 |
| 10 | 10 | (United States) Kenny Roberts Jr. | Suzuki Grand Prix Team | Suzuki | 27 | +41.652 | 1 | 6 |
| 11 | 26 | (Japan) Haruchika Aoki | FCC TSR | TSR-Honda | 27 | +47.628 | 17 | 5 |
| 12 | 17 | (Netherlands) Jurgen van den Goorbergh | Team Biland GP1 | MuZ Weber | 27 | +47.670 | 18 | 4 |
| 13 | 52 | (Spain) José David de Gea | Proton KR Modenas | Modenas KR3 | 27 | +1:22.997 | 21 | 3 |
| 14 | 37 | (Australia) Steve Martin | Dee Cee Jeans Racing Team | Honda | 27 | +1:23.305 | 23 | 2 |
| 15 | 68 | (Australia) Mark Willis | Buckley Systems BSL Racing | Modenas KR3 | 27 | +1:35.980 | 24 | 1 |
| 16 | 6 | (Japan) Norick Abe | Antena 3 Yamaha d'Antin | Yamaha | 26 | +1 lap | 8 | |
| 17 | 14 | (Spain) Juan Borja | Movistar Honda Pons | Honda | 26 | +1 lap | 9 | |
| Ret | 31 | (Japan) Tetsuya Harada | Aprilia Grand Prix Racing | Aprilia | 23 | Retirement | 2 | |
| Ret | 5 | (Brazil) Alex Barros | Movistar Honda Pons | Honda | 23 | Retirement | 4 | |
| Ret | 22 | (France) Sébastien Gimbert | Tecmas Honda Elf | Honda | 6 | Accident | 20 | |
| Ret | 25 | (Spain) José Luis Cardoso | Team Maxon TSR | TSR-Honda | 5 | Retirement | 16 | |
| Ret | 20 | (United States) Mike Hale | Proton KR Modenas | Modenas KR3 | 3 | Retirement | 19 | |
| Ret | 21 | (United Kingdom) Michael Rutter | Millar Honda | Honda | 2 | Retirement | 22 | |
| Ret | 35 | (Australia) Anthony Gobert | Team Biland GP1 | MuZ Weber | 0 | Accident | 13 | |

== 250 cc classification ==
| Pos. | No. | Rider | Manufacturer | Laps | Time/Retired | Grid | Points |
|---|---|---|---|---|---|---|---|
| 1 | 46 | (Italy) Valentino Rossi | Aprilia | 25 | 39:28.278 | 7 | 25 |
| 2 | 19 | (France) Olivier Jacque | Yamaha | 25 | +0.103 | 2 | 20 |
| 3 | 4 | (Japan) Tohru Ukawa | Honda | 25 | +0.729 | 5 | 16 |
| 4 | 56 | (Japan) Shinya Nakano | Yamaha | 25 | +0.796 | 4 | 13 |
| 5 | 6 | (Germany) Ralf Waldmann | Aprilia | 25 | +13.097 | 8 | 11 |
| 6 | 1 | (Italy) Loris Capirossi | Honda | 25 | +13.133 | 3 | 10 |
| 7 | 7 | (Italy) Stefano Perugini | Honda | 25 | +25.831 | 10 | 9 |
| 8 | 21 | (Italy) Franco Battaini | Aprilia | 25 | +25.994 | 11 | 8 |
| 9 | 12 | (Argentina) Sebastián Porto | Yamaha | 25 | +35.124 | 9 | 7 |
| 10 | 14 | (Australia) Anthony West | TSR-Honda | 25 | +36.446 | 13 | 6 |
| 11 | 11 | (Japan) Tomomi Manako | Yamaha | 25 | +49.725 | 12 | 5 |
| 12 | 24 | (United Kingdom) Jason Vincent | Honda | 25 | +50.949 | 6 | 4 |
| 13 | 66 | (Germany) Alex Hofmann | TSR-Honda | 25 | +59.357 | 16 | 3 |
| 14 | 37 | (Italy) Luca Boscoscuro | TSR-Honda | 25 | +59.373 | 15 | 2 |
| 15 | 36 | (Japan) Masaki Tokudome | TSR-Honda | 25 | +1:06.163 | 20 | 1 |
| 16 | 10 | (Spain) Fonsi Nieto | Yamaha | 25 | +1:27.873 | 19 | |
| 17 | 15 | (Spain) David García | Yamaha | 25 | +1:29.494 | 21 | |
| 18 | 41 | (Netherlands) Jarno Janssen | TSR-Honda | 24 | +1 lap | 22 | |
| 19 | 16 | (Sweden) Johan Stigefelt | Yamaha | 24 | +1 lap | 25 | |
| 20 | 58 | (Argentina) Matías Ríos | Aprilia | 24 | +1 lap | 28 | |
| 21 | 39 | (Australia) Roger Harrison | Yamaha | 24 | +1 lap | 27 | |
| Ret | 40 | (Australia) Jay Taylor | Honda | 22 | Accident | 26 | |
| Ret | 38 | (Australia) Shaun Geronimi | Yamaha | 2 | Accident | 18 | |
| Ret | 17 | (Netherlands) Maurice Bolwerk | TSR-Honda | 2 | Accident | 17 | |
| Ret | 23 | (France) Julien Allemand | TSR-Honda | 2 | Retirement | 14 | |
| Ret | 18 | (United Kingdom) Scott Smart | Aprilia | 2 | Retirement | 23 | |
| Ret | 9 | (United Kingdom) Jeremy McWilliams | Aprilia | 1 | Accident | 1 | |
| Ret | 43 | (Australia) Kevin Curtain | Honda | 1 | Retirement | 24 | |
| DNS | 44 | (Italy) Roberto Rolfo | Aprilia | | Did not start | | |
| DNQ | 42 | (New Zealand) Aaron Clark | Honda | | Did not qualify | | |
| DNQ | 22 | (Spain) Lucas Oliver Bultó | Yamaha | | Did not qualify | | |

== 125 cc classification ==
| Pos. | No. | Rider | Manufacturer | Laps | Time/Retired | Grid | Points |
|---|---|---|---|---|---|---|---|
| 1 | 13 | (Italy) Marco Melandri | Honda | 23 | 38:07.081 | 3 | 25 |
| 2 | 5 | (Italy) Lucio Cecchinello | Honda | 23 | +0.035 | 2 | 20 |
| 3 | 41 | (Japan) Youichi Ui | Derbi | 23 | +0.179 | 4 | 16 |
| 4 | 8 | (Italy) Gianluigi Scalvini | Aprilia | 23 | +1.043 | 8 | 13 |
| 5 | 4 | (Japan) Masao Azuma | Honda | 23 | +1.259 | 16 | 11 |
| 6 | 15 | (Italy) Roberto Locatelli | Aprilia | 23 | +1.898 | 6 | 10 |
| 7 | 10 | (Spain) Jerónimo Vidal | Aprilia | 23 | +10.207 | 10 | 9 |
| 8 | 23 | (Italy) Gino Borsoi | Aprilia | 23 | +11.845 | 7 | 8 |
| 9 | 54 | (San Marino) Manuel Poggiali | Aprilia | 23 | +12.890 | 9 | 7 |
| 10 | 17 | (Germany) Steve Jenkner | Aprilia | 23 | +16.527 | 15 | 6 |
| 11 | 32 | (Italy) Mirko Giansanti | Aprilia | 23 | +16.731 | 12 | 5 |
| 12 | 16 | (Italy) Simone Sanna | Honda | 23 | +16.837 | 13 | 4 |
| 13 | 1 | (Japan) Kazuto Sakata | Honda | 23 | +36.339 | 17 | 3 |
| 14 | 26 | (Italy) Ivan Goi | Honda | 23 | +36.408 | 19 | 2 |
| 15 | 7 | (Spain) Emilio Alzamora | Honda | 23 | +49.941 | 11 | 1 |
| 16 | 44 | (Italy) Alessandro Brannetti | Aprilia | 23 | +51.121 | 20 | |
| 17 | 22 | (Spain) Pablo Nieto | Derbi | 23 | +51.786 | 18 | |
| 18 | 29 | (Spain) Ángel Nieto, Jr. | Honda | 23 | +53.389 | 14 | |
| 19 | 9 | (France) Frédéric Petit | Aprilia | 23 | +1:07.146 | 21 | |
| 20 | 18 | (Germany) Reinhard Stolz | Honda | 23 | +1:16.137 | 27 | |
| 21 | 12 | (France) Randy de Puniet | Aprilia | 23 | +1:16.144 | 25 | |
| 22 | 24 | (Denmark) Robbin Harms | Aprilia | 23 | +1:28.270 | 26 | |
| 23 | 88 | (Australia) Broc Parkes | Honda | 22 | +1 lap | 29 | |
| 24 | 92 | (Australia) Dennis Charlett | Honda | 22 | +1 lap | 30 | |
| Ret | 6 | (Japan) Noboru Ueda | Honda | 19 | Accident | 1 | |
| Ret | 21 | (France) Arnaud Vincent | Aprilia | 8 | Retirement | 5 | |
| Ret | 90 | (Australia) Andrew Willy | Honda | 6 | Retirement | 28 | |
| Ret | 89 | (Australia) Peter Galvin | Honda | 5 | Retirement | 23 | |
| Ret | 11 | (Italy) Max Sabbatani | Honda | 3 | Retirement | 22 | |
| Ret | 91 | (Australia) Michael Teniswood | Honda | 0 | Retirement | 24 | |

== Championship standings after the race (500cc) ==
Below are the standings for the top five riders and constructors after round thirteen has concluded.

Riders' Championship standings

| Pos. | Rider | Points |
|---|---|---|
| 1 | (Spain) Àlex Crivillé | 230 |
| 2 | (Japan) Tadayuki Okada | 189 |
| 3 | (United States) Kenny Roberts Jr. | 179 |
| 4 | (Italy) Max Biaggi | 129 |
| 5 | (Spain) Sete Gibernau | 124 |

Constructors' Championship standings

| Pos. | Constructor | Points |
|---|---|---|
| 1 | (Japan) Honda | 294 |
| 2 | (Japan) Yamaha | 210 |
| 3 | (Japan) Suzuki | 181 |
| 4 | (Italy) Aprilia | 94 |
| 5 | (Germany) MuZ Weber | 56 |

- Note: Only the top five positions are included for both sets of standings.

| Previous race: 1999 Valencian Grand Prix | FIM Grand Prix World Championship; 1999 season | Next race: 1999 South African Grand Prix |
| Previous race: 1998 Australian Grand Prix | Australian Grand Prix | Next race: 2000 Australian Grand Prix |
