= 2003 Japanese motorcycle Grand Prix =

(Japan) 2003 Japanese Grand Prix
Race details
- Race 1 of 16 races in the 2003 Grand Prix motorcycle racing season
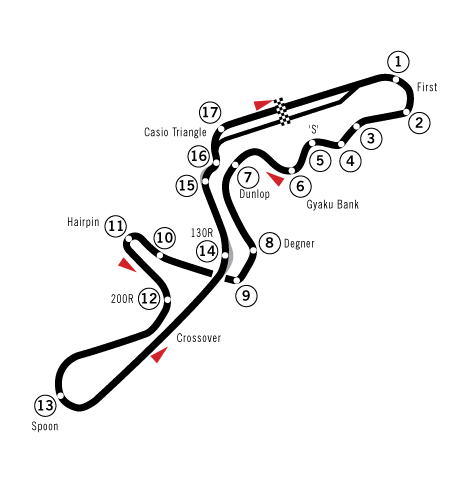
- Date: 6 April 2003
- Official name: SKYY vodka Grand Prix of Japan
- Location: Suzuka Circuit
- Course: Permanent racing facility; 5.824 km (3.619 mi)

MotoGP
Pole position
Rider	(Italy) Valentino Rossi	Honda
Time	2:06.838	
Fastest lap
Rider	(Italy) Valentino Rossi	Honda
Time	2:04.970 on lap 6	
Podium
First	(Italy) Valentino Rossi	Honda
Second	(Italy) Max Biaggi	Honda
Third	(Italy) Loris Capirossi	Ducati

250cc
Pole position
Rider	(Japan) Hiroshi Aoyama	Honda
Time	2:17.930	
Fastest lap
Rider	(Japan) Hiroshi Aoyama	Honda
Time	2:09.839 on lap 17	
Podium
First	(San Marino) Manuel Poggiali	Aprilia
Second	(Japan) Hiroshi Aoyama	Honda
Third	(Japan) Yuki Takahashi	Honda

125cc
Pole position
Rider	(San Marino) Alex de Angelis	Aprilia
Time	2:15.417	
Fastest lap
Rider	(Italy) Stefano Perugini	Aprilia
Time	2:14.282 on lap 6	
Podium
First	(Italy) Stefano Perugini	Aprilia
Second	(Italy) Mirko Giansanti	Aprilia
Third	(Germany) Steve Jenkner	Aprilia

The 2003 Japanese Motorcycle Grand Prix was the first round of the 2003 MotoGP Championship. It took place on the weekend of 4–6 April 2003 at Suzuka. The meeting was overshadowed by the death of Daijiro Kato in the MotoGP race, after he crashed at 130R and hit the barrier at high speed in the ensuing Casio Triangle. Since the accident, Suzuka has been removed from the MotoGP calendar, with the Japanese Grand Prix having been moved to Twin Ring Motegi, the previous home of the Pacific Grand Prix.

== MotoGP classification ==
After the Friday timed sessions Norifumi Abe, who was already competing in the event as a wild card entry, was designated as the replacement rider for the injured Marco Melandri.

Pos.	No.	Rider	Team	Manufacturer	Laps	Time/Retired	Grid	Points
1	46	(Italy) Valentino Rossi	Repsol Honda	Honda	21	44:13.182	1	25
2	3	(Italy) Max Biaggi	Camel Pramac Pons	Honda	21	+6.445	2	20
3	65	(Italy) Loris Capirossi	Ducati Marlboro Team	Ducati	21	+8.209	15	16
4	15	(Spain) Sete Gibernau	Telefónica Movistar Honda	Honda	21	+13.209	6	13
5	12	(Australia) Troy Bayliss	Ducati Marlboro Team	Ducati	21	+23.099	13	11
6	45	(United States) Colin Edwards	Alice Aprilia Racing	Aprilia	21	+29.040	9	10
7	69	(United States) Nicky Hayden	Repsol Honda	Honda	21	+29.126	22	9
8	4	(Brazil) Alex Barros	Gauloises Yamaha Team	Yamaha	21	+30.526	8	8
9	56	(Japan) Shinya Nakano	d'Antín Yamaha Team	Yamaha	21	+33.447	10	7
10	7	(Spain) Carlos Checa	Fortuna Yamaha Team	Yamaha	21	+40.200	4	6
11	17	(Japan) Norifumi Abe	Fortuna Yamaha Team	Yamaha	21	+44.790	14	5
12	41	(Japan) Noriyuki Haga	Alice Aprilia Racing	Aprilia	21	+1:03.358	17	4
13	21	(United States) John Hopkins	Suzuki Grand Prix Team	Suzuki	21	+1:03.950	12	3
14	10	(United States) Kenny Roberts Jr.	Suzuki Grand Prix Team	Suzuki	21	+1:04.085	7	2
15	19	(France) Olivier Jacque	Gauloises Yamaha Team	Yamaha	21	+1:09.990	21	1
16	8	(Australia) Garry McCoy	Kawasaki Racing Team	Kawasaki	21	+1:16.572	20	
17	88	(Australia) Andrew Pitt	Kawasaki Racing Team	Kawasaki	21	+1:17.380	23	
18	48	(Japan) Akira Yanagawa	Kawasaki Racing Team	Kawasaki	21	+1:23.605	18	
19	25	(Japan) Tamaki Serizawa	Moriwaki Racing WCM	MD211VF Proto	21	+1:35.459	16	
20	11	(Japan) Tohru Ukawa	Camel Pramac Pons	Honda	21	+1:57.128	3	
Ret	6	(Japan) Makoto Tamada	Pramac Honda	Honda	12	Accident	5	
Ret	9	(Japan) Nobuatsu Aoki	Proton Team KR	Proton KR	7	Retirement	19	
Ret	99	(United Kingdom) Jeremy McWilliams	Proton Team KR	Proton KR	6	Accident	24	
Ret	74	(Japan) Daijiro Kato	Telefónica Movistar Honda	Honda	2	Fatal accident	11	
DNS	35	(United Kingdom) Chris Burns	WCM	Harris WCM		Did not start		
Sources:

- Daijiro Kato died on 20 April 2003 from injuries sustained during the accident.

== 250 cc classification ==
Pos.	No.	Rider	Manufacturer	Laps	Time/Retired	Grid	Points
1	54	(San Marino) Manuel Poggiali	Aprilia	19	41:36.284	23	25
2	92	(Japan) Hiroshi Aoyama	Honda	19	+1.373	1	20
3	72	(Japan) Yuki Takahashi	Honda	19	+1.496	7	16
4	5	(Argentina) Sebastián Porto	Honda	19	+1.700	6	13
5	21	(Italy) Franco Battaini	Aprilia	19	+11.771	16	11
6	10	(Spain) Fonsi Nieto	Aprilia	19	+13.220	9	10
7	3	(Italy) Roberto Rolfo	Honda	19	+13.497	4	9
8	8	(Japan) Naoki Matsudo	Yamaha	19	+14.027	5	8
9	68	(Japan) Tekkyu Kayoh	Yamaha	19	+24.546	12	7
10	50	(France) Sylvain Guintoli	Aprilia	19	+42.722	8	6
11	6	(Spain) Alex Debón	Honda	19	+43.246	3	5
12	36	(France) Erwan Nigon	Aprilia	19	+47.871	21	4
13	11	(Spain) Joan Olivé	Aprilia	19	+1:09.405	30	3
14	16	(Sweden) Johan Stigefelt	Aprilia	19	+1:09.779	13	2
15	96	(Czech Republic) Jakub Smrž	Honda	19	+1:21.048	10	1
16	34	(France) Eric Bataille	Honda	19	+1:21.788	28	
17	13	(Czech Republic) Jaroslav Huleš	Yamaha	19	+1:35.538	15	
18	57	(United Kingdom) Chaz Davies	Aprilia	19	+1:38.489	29	
19	18	(Netherlands) Henk vd Lagemaat	Honda	19	+1:41.507	25	
20	98	(Germany) Katja Poensgen	Honda	18	+1 lap	26	
Ret	33	(Spain) Héctor Faubel	Aprilia	18	Accident	18	
Ret	15	(Germany) Christian Gemmel	Honda	17	Accident	24	
Ret	26	(Italy) Alex Baldolini	Aprilia	17	Retirement	11	
Ret	14	(Australia) Anthony West	Aprilia	15	Accident	17	
Ret	24	(Spain) Toni Elías	Aprilia	14	Retirement	27	
Ret	71	(Japan) Katsuyuki Nakasuga	Yamaha	10	Accident	2	
Ret	7	(France) Randy de Puniet	Aprilia	4	Retirement	20	
Ret	28	(Germany) Dirk Heidolf	Aprilia	0	Accident	19	
Ret	67	(Japan) Tomoyoshi Koyama	Yamaha	0	Accident	22	
Ret	9	(France) Hugo Marchand	Aprilia	0	Retirement	14	

== 125 cc classification ==
Pos.	No.	Rider	Manufacturer	Laps	Time/Retired	Grid	Points
1	7	(Italy) Stefano Perugini	Aprilia	18	40:53.083	5	25
2	6	(Italy) Mirko Giansanti	Aprilia	18	+0.037	4	20
3	17	(Germany) Steve Jenkner	Aprilia	18	+1.033	13	16
4	4	(Italy) Lucio Cecchinello	Aprilia	18	+6.701	3	13
5	34	(Italy) Andrea Dovizioso	Honda	18	+8.594	8	11
6	41	(Japan) Youichi Ui	Aprilia	18	+8.940	18	10
7	22	(Spain) Pablo Nieto	Aprilia	18	+9.083	11	9
8	3	(Spain) Daniel Pedrosa	Honda	18	+22.993	2	8
9	12	(Switzerland) Thomas Lüthi	Honda	18	+33.708	17	7
10	23	(Italy) Gino Borsoi	Aprilia	18	+34.234	20	6
11	36	(Finland) Mika Kallio	Honda	18	+34.280	34	5
12	24	(Italy) Simone Corsi	Honda	18	+35.245	28	4
13	11	(Italy) Max Sabbatani	Aprilia	18	+35.818	6	3
14	79	(Hungary) Gábor Talmácsi	Aprilia	18	+35.945	23	2
15	42	(Italy) Gioele Pellino	Aprilia	18	+36.307	22	1
16	32	(Italy) Fabrizio Lai	Malaguti	18	+42.964	21	
17	8	(Japan) Masao Azuma	Honda	18	+43.063	30	
18	19	(Spain) Álvaro Bautista	Aprilia	18	+51.526	19	
19	31	(Spain) Julián Simón	Malaguti	18	+57.880	24	
20	65	(Japan) Toshihisa Kuzuhara	Honda	18	+58.129	25	
21	58	(Italy) Marco Simoncelli	Aprilia	18	+58.412	15	
22	63	(France) Mike Di Meglio	Aprilia	18	+1:16.078	33	
23	10	(Italy) Roberto Locatelli	KTM	18	+1:17.164	27	
24	25	(Hungary) Imre Tóth	Honda	18	+1:21.140	31	
25	14	(United Kingdom) Chris Martin	Aprilia	18	+1:21.384	32	
26	21	(United Kingdom) Leon Camier	Honda	18	+1:56.001	36	
27	67	(Japan) Akio Tanaka	Honda	17	+1 lap	37	
Ret	66	(Japan) Shuhei Aoyama	Honda	17	Retirement	12	
Ret	78	(Hungary) Péter Lénárt	Honda	15	Accident	35	
Ret	27	(Australia) Casey Stoner	Aprilia	8	Accident	7	
Ret	33	(Italy) Stefano Bianco	Gilera	7	Accident	10	
Ret	48	(Spain) Jorge Lorenzo	Derbi	7	Retirement	29	
Ret	15	(San Marino) Alex de Angelis	Aprilia	6	Accident	1	
Ret	1	(France) Arnaud Vincent	KTM	2	Retirement	16	
Ret	26	(Spain) Emilio Alzamora	Derbi	2	Retirement	14	
Ret	80	(Spain) Héctor Barberá	Aprilia	1	Accident	9	
Ret	68	(Japan) Sadahito Suma	Honda	1	Retirement	26	
DNQ	64	(China) Cheung Way On	Honda		Did not qualify		

== Championship standings after the race (MotoGP) ==
Below are the standings for the top five riders and constructors after round one has concluded.

Riders' Championship standings

Pos.	Rider	Points
1	(Italy) Valentino Rossi	25
2	(Italy) Max Biaggi	20
3	(Italy) Loris Capirossi	16
4	(Spain) Sete Gibernau	13
5	(Australia) Troy Bayliss	11

Constructors' Championship standings

Pos.	Constructor	Points
1	(Japan) Honda	25
2	(Italy) Ducati	16
3	(Italy) Aprilia	10
4	(Japan) Yamaha	8
5	(Japan) Suzuki	3

- Note: Only the top five positions are included for both sets of standings.

Previous race: 2002 Valencian Grand Prix	FIM Grand Prix World Championship; 2003 season	Next race: 2003 South African Grand Prix
Previous race: 2002 Japanese Grand Prix	Japanese motorcycle Grand Prix	Next race: 2004 Japanese Grand Prix
