= Manuel Poggiali =

Sammarinese motorcycle racer (born 1983)

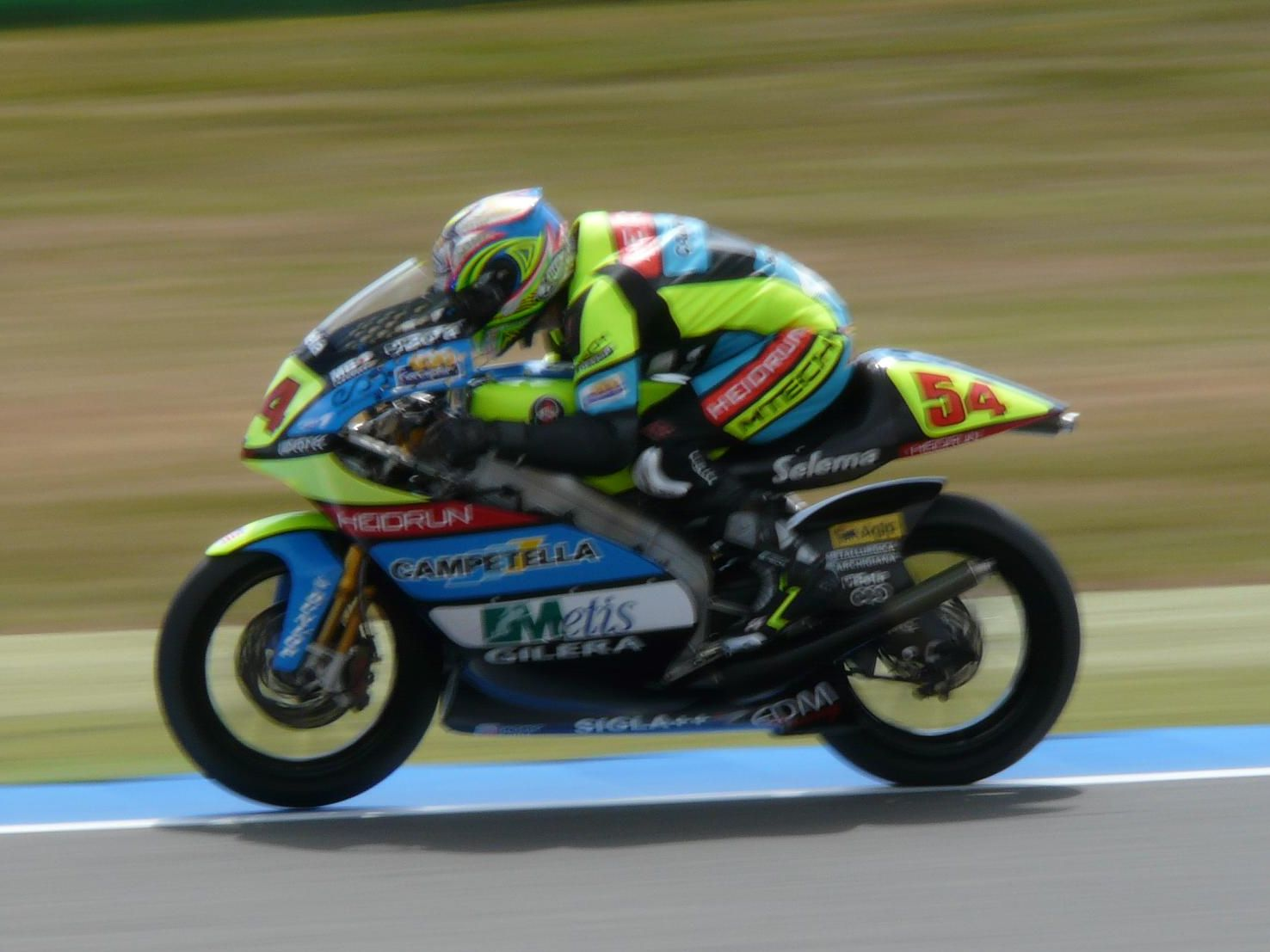
- Poggiali at the 2008 Dutch TT
- Nationality: San Marino
Motorcycle racing career statistics
250cc World Championship
Active years	2003, 2004, 2006, 2008
Manufacturers	Aprilia, KTM, Gilera
Championships	1
2008 championship position	19th (16 pts)
Starts / Wins / Podiums / Poles / F. laps / Points; 56 / 5 / 13 / 3 / 6 / 410
125cc World Championship
Active years	1999–2002, 2005
Manufacturers	Aprilia, Gilera
Championships	1
2005 championship position	10th (107 pts)
Starts / Wins / Podiums / Poles / F. laps / Points; 76 / 7 / 22 / 8 / 1 / 701

Manuel Poggiali (Italian pronunciation: [ˈmanuel podˈdʒali]; born 14 February 1983) is a Sammarinese Grand Prix motorcycle road racing World Champion. He was the 2001 125cc World Champion, and the 2003 250cc World Champion. He scored 12 race wins, 11 pole positions, and 35 podium finishes.

== Career ==
Poggiali began racing Minibikes in 1994, and made his first Grand Prix starts in 1998, also winning the Italian 125cc Championship that year. He went into the 125cc World Championship full-time in 1999, and showed promise over the next two years, scoring a first podium at Assen in 2000. In 2001 he improved to win the title on a Gilera. He remained in the class in 2002, scoring seven podiums in the first eight races but failing to defend his title, losing out to Arnaud Vincent.

For 2003, Poggiali moved up to 250s, and followed Freddie Spencer and Tetsuya Harada in winning the title at his first attempt, including victories in the season's first two races. He had a disappointing 2004 however, finishing only 9th overall with just three podium results.

For 2005, Poggiali returned to 125s, again looking like a shadow of his former self, failing to take a single podium. In 2006, he raced in the 250cc class for the KTM team, but they did not renew his contract for 2007. Although he received some offers from 125cc, 250cc, and Superbike teams, he decided to refuse the offers and take a sabbatical, hoping to get better offers in 2008. He made his return to racing after announcing that he would ride for Campetella Racing alongside Fabrizio Lai. He decided to retire midseason after losing enthusiasm.

Poggiali is also a footballer, he played some matches over the last years for Pennarossa, a football club of San Marino.

For 2013, Poggiali returned to motorcycle racing and rode in the Italian Superbike Championship for Scuderia Corse Team Grandi aboard a Ducati 1199 Panigale. He finished the season in 14th overall with a second-place finish in the penultimate race of the year at Mugello being his best finish. For 2014, he signed to ride for the Barni Racing Team aboard a Ducati 1199 Panigale in the CIV Superbike Championship and finished 11th overall.

== Career statistics ==
=== Grand Prix motorcycle racing ===
==== Races by year ====
(key) (Races in bold indicate pole position; races in italics indicate fastest lap)

Year	Class	Bike	1	2	3	4	5	6	7	8	9	10	11	12	13	14	15	16	17	Pos	Pts
1999	125cc	Aprilia	MAL; 12	JPN; 18	ESP; 9	FRA; Ret	ITA; 13	CAT; Ret	NED; 13	GBR; Ret	GER; 11	CZE	IMO; 8	VAL; Ret	AUS; 9	RSA; Ret	BRA; 7	ARG; Ret		17th	46
2000	125cc	Aprilia	RSA	MAL	JPN	ESP; 9	FRA; 8	ITA; Ret	CAT; Ret	NED; 3	GBR; Ret	GER; Ret	CZE; 12	POR; Ret	VAL; 14	BRA; Ret	PAC; 11	AUS; 5		16th	53
2001	125cc	Gilera	JPN; 5	RSA; 2	ESP; Ret	FRA; 1	ITA; 3	CAT; 3	NED; Ret	GBR; 3	GER; 3	CZE; Ret	**POR**; 1	VAL; 1	PAC; 2	**AUS**; 2	MAL; 2	BRA; 5		**1st**	**241**
2002	125cc	Gilera	JPN; 3	RSA; 1	ESP; DSQ	**FRA**; 2	**ITA**; 1	**CAT**; 1	NED; 2	**GBR**; 3	GER; 4	CZE; 5	POR; Ret	**BRA**; 3	PAC; 2	MAL; 4	**AUS**; 1	VAL; 7		**2nd**	**254**
2003	250cc	Aprilia	JPN; 1	RSA; 1	ESP; 4	**FRA**; Ret	ITA; 1	CAT; Ret	**NED**; 4	GBR; 2	GER; 8	**CZE**; 3	POR; 2	BRA; 1	PAC; 3	MAL; 2	AUS; 9	VAL; 3		**1st**	**249**
2004	250cc	Aprilia	RSA; 4	ESP; Ret	FRA; Ret	ITA; 3	CAT; Ret	NED; 7	BRA; 1	GER; Ret	GBR; Ret	CZE; 9	POR; 7	JPN; 17	QAT	MAL	AUS; 3	VAL; Ret		9th	95
2005	125cc	Gilera	ESP; 6	POR; 5	CHN; 12	FRA; 10	ITA; 6	CAT; 6	NED; 8	GBR; 25	GER; 11	CZE; 8	JPN; 6	MAL; 8	QAT; 7	AUS; 13	TUR; 11	VAL; Ret		10th	107
2006	250cc	KTM	ESP; 11	QAT; 14	TUR; 15	CHN; 11	FRA; 17	ITA; 12	CAT; 11	NED; 10	GBR; Ret	GER; 13	CZE; Ret	MAL; 11	AUS; 13	JPN; 12	POR; 12	VAL; 8		14th	50
2008	250cc	Gilera	QAT; 14	ESP; Ret	POR; 17	CHN; Ret	FRA; 6	ITA; Ret	CAT; 14	GBR; 14	NED; Ret	GER; Ret	CZE; DNS	RSM	INP	JPN	AUS	MAL	VAL	19th	16

Preceded by Marco Melandri	Italian 125cc Champion; 1998	Succeeded by Fabrizio De Marco
