= 2006 Dutch TT =

MotoGP Race

(Netherlands) 2006 Dutch TT
Race details
- Race 8 of 17 races in the 2006 Grand Prix motorcycle racing season
- Date: 24 June 2006
- Official name: A-Style TT Assen
- Location: TT Circuit Assen
- Course: Permanent racing facility; 4.555 km (2.830 mi)

MotoGP
Pole position
- Rider: (United States) John Hopkins
- Time: 1:36.411
Fastest lap
- Rider: (United States) Nicky Hayden
- Time: 1:37.106
Podium
- First: (United States) Nicky Hayden
- Second: (Japan) Shinya Nakano
- Third: (Spain) Dani Pedrosa

250cc
Pole position
- Rider: (Spain) Jorge Lorenzo
- Time: 1:40.007
Fastest lap
- Rider: (Spain) Jorge Lorenzo
- Time: 1:40.500
Podium
- First: (Spain) Jorge Lorenzo
- Second: (San Marino) Alex de Angelis
- Third: (Italy) Andrea Dovizioso

125cc
Pole position
- Rider: (Finland) Mika Kallio
- Time: 1:44.532
Fastest lap
- Rider: (Spain) Sergio Gadea
- Time: 1:45.098
Podium
- First: (Finland) Mika Kallio
- Second: (Spain) Sergio Gadea
- Third: (Spain) Álvaro Bautista

The 2006 Dutch TT was the eighth round of the 2006 MotoGP Championship. It took place on the weekend of 22–24 June 2006 at the TT Circuit Assen located in Assen, Netherlands.

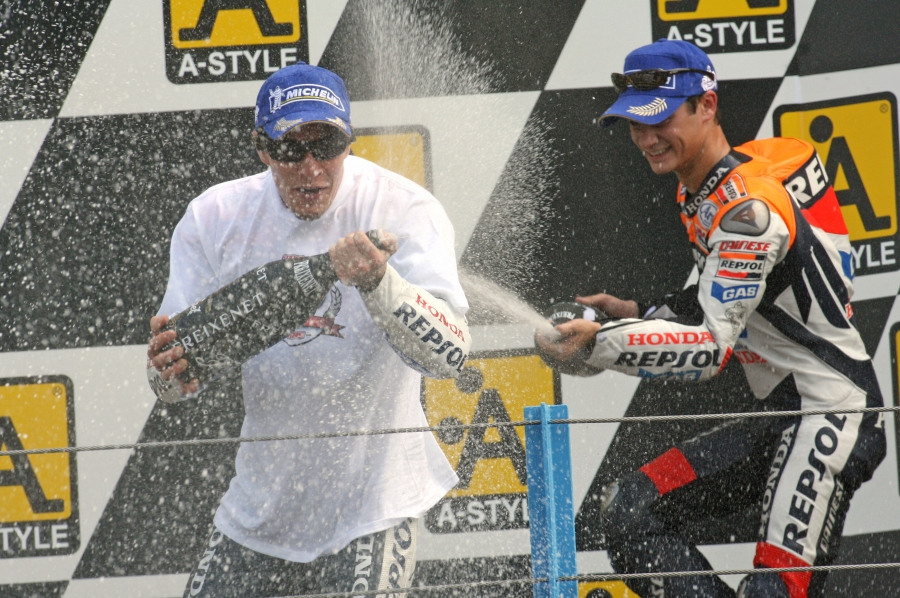
Nicky Hayden and Dani Pedrosa, spraying the champagne after finishing first and third at the MotoGP race. Hayden beat the Yamaha of Colin Edwards in a last-lap battle, which saw both riders drive through the gravel, with Edwards crashing out as a result.

== MotoGP classification ==
Pos.	No.	Rider	Team	Manufacturer	Laps	Time/Retired	Grid	Points
1	69	(United States) Nicky Hayden	Repsol Honda Team	Honda	26	42:27.404	4	25
2	56	(Japan) Shinya Nakano	Kawasaki Racing Team	Kawasaki	26	+4.884	2	20
3	26	(Spain) Dani Pedrosa	Repsol Honda Team	Honda	26	+7.525	5	16
4	27	(Australia) Casey Stoner	Honda LCR	Honda	26	+7.555	12	13
5	10	(United States) Kenny Roberts Jr.	Team Roberts	KR211V	26	+8.078	10	11
6	21	(United States) John Hopkins	Rizla Suzuki MotoGP	Suzuki	26	+17.065	1	10
7	33	(Italy) Marco Melandri	Fortuna Honda	Honda	26	+18.090	7	9
8	46	(Italy) Valentino Rossi	Camel Yamaha Team	Yamaha	26	+23.951	18	8
9	7	(Spain) Carlos Checa	Tech 3 Yamaha	Yamaha	26	+29.027	8	7
10	71	(Australia) Chris Vermeulen	Rizla Suzuki MotoGP	Suzuki	26	+31.627	6	6
11	6	(Japan) Makoto Tamada	Konica Minolta Honda	Honda	26	+32.841	13	5
12	66	(Germany) Alex Hofmann	Ducati Marlboro Team	Ducati	26	+34.143	9	4
13	5	(United States) Colin Edwards	Camel Yamaha Team	Yamaha	26	+40.412	3	3
14	17	(France) Randy de Puniet	Kawasaki Racing Team	Kawasaki	26	+1:03.648	11	2
15	65	(Italy) Loris Capirossi	Ducati Marlboro Team	Ducati	26	+1:17.303	15	1
16	22	(Spain) Iván Silva	Pramac d'Antin MotoGP	Ducati	25	+1 lap	17	
17	30	(Spain) José Luis Cardoso	Pramac d'Antin MotoGP	Ducati	23	+3 laps	16	
Ret	77	(United Kingdom) James Ellison	Tech 3 Yamaha	Yamaha	3	Accident	14	
WD	24	(Spain) Toni Elías	Fortuna Honda	Honda		Withdrew		

== 250 cc classification ==
Pos.	No.	Rider	Manufacturer	Laps	Time/Retired	Grid	Points
1	48	(Spain) Jorge Lorenzo	Aprilia	24	40:30.770	1	25
2	7	(San Marino) Alex de Angelis	Aprilia	24	+8.168	2	20
3	34	(Italy) Andrea Dovizioso	Honda	24	+8.241	3	16
4	6	(Spain) Alex Debón	Aprilia	24	+31.875	9	13
5	15	(Italy) Roberto Locatelli	Aprilia	24	+34.686	8	11
6	55	(Japan) Yuki Takahashi	Honda	24	+39.326	5	10
7	58	(Italy) Marco Simoncelli	Gilera	24	+39.383	6	9
8	14	(Australia) Anthony West	Aprilia	24	+45.104	11	8
9	4	(Japan) Hiroshi Aoyama	KTM	24	+47.526	10	7
10	54	(San Marino) Manuel Poggiali	KTM	24	+59.296	17	6
11	25	(Italy) Alex Baldolini	Aprilia	24	+1:04.424	15	5
12	73	(Japan) Shuhei Aoyama	Honda	24	+1:05.827	4	4
13	9	(Italy) Franco Battaini	Aprilia	24	+1:14.392	16	3
14	23	(Spain) Arturo Tizón	Honda	24	+1:21.750	22	2
15	42	(Spain) Aleix Espargaró	Honda	24	+1:21.763	18	1
16	37	(Argentina) Fabricio Perren	Honda	24	+1:33.418	21	
17	24	(Spain) Jordi Carchano	Aprilia	24	+1:42.902	20	
18	22	(Italy) Luca Morelli	Aprilia	23	+1 lap	23	
19	17	(Germany) Franz Aschenbrenner	Aprilia	23	+1 lap	24	
20	70	(Netherlands) Raymond Schouten	Honda	23	+1 lap	25	
21	68	(Netherlands) Randy Gevers	Aprilia	23	+1 lap	26	
22	69	(Netherlands) Bram Appelo	Honda	23	+1 lap	28	
23	71	(Netherlands) Jan Roelofs	Yamaha	23	+1 lap	27	
Ret	96	(Czech Republic) Jakub Smrž	Aprilia	1	Retirement	14	
Ret	16	(France) Jules Cluzel	Aprilia	0	Accident	19	
Ret	36	(Colombia) Martín Cárdenas	Honda	0	Accident	12	
Ret	50	(France) Sylvain Guintoli	Aprilia	0	Accident	7	
Ret	8	(Italy) Andrea Ballerini	Aprilia	0	Accident	13	
DNQ	21	(France) Arnaud Vincent	Honda		Did not qualify		
DNQ	72	(Belgium) David Drieghe	Honda		Did not qualify		
DNQ	85	(Italy) Alessio Palumbo	Aprilia		Did not qualify		
OFFICIAL 250cc REPORT

== 125 cc classification ==
Pos.	No.	Rider	Manufacturer	Laps	Time/Retired	Grid	Points
1	36	(Finland) Mika Kallio	KTM	22	38:51.450	1	25
2	33	(Spain) Sergio Gadea	Aprilia	22	+0.122	4	20
3	19	(Spain) Álvaro Bautista	Aprilia	22	+0.128	2	16
4	24	(Italy) Simone Corsi	Gilera	22	+6.793	9	13
5	52	(Czech Republic) Lukáš Pešek	Derbi	22	+6.828	3	11
6	55	(Spain) Héctor Faubel	Aprilia	22	+10.647	6	10
7	75	(Italy) Mattia Pasini	Aprilia	22	+10.691	5	9
8	1	(Switzerland) Thomas Lüthi	Honda	22	+10.935	19	8
9	22	(Spain) Pablo Nieto	Aprilia	22	+13.297	10	7
10	35	(Italy) Raffaele De Rosa	Aprilia	22	+13.336	17	6
11	14	(Hungary) Gábor Talmácsi	Honda	22	+13.430	11	5
12	6	(Spain) Joan Olivé	Aprilia	22	+20.824	15	4
13	63	(France) Mike Di Meglio	Honda	22	+24.778	14	3
14	11	(Germany) Sandro Cortese	Honda	22	+27.876	18	2
15	18	(Spain) Nicolás Terol	Derbi	22	+28.772	8	1
16	38	(United Kingdom) Bradley Smith	Honda	22	+37.462	22	
17	8	(Italy) Lorenzo Zanetti	Aprilia	22	+39.194	16	
18	43	(Spain) Manuel Hernández	Aprilia	22	+46.514	21	
19	37	(Netherlands) Joey Litjens	Honda	22	+47.384	25	
20	16	(Italy) Michele Conti	Honda	22	+47.911	26	
21	26	(Switzerland) Vincent Braillard	Aprilia	22	+48.374	30	
22	9	(Austria) Michael Ranseder	KTM	22	+48.880	40	
23	95	(Germany) Georg Fröhlich	Honda	22	+59.268	27	
24	23	(Italy) Lorenzo Baroni	Honda	22	+59.373	37	
25	34	(Spain) Esteve Rabat	Honda	22	+59.455	34	
26	53	(Italy) Simone Grotzkyj	Aprilia	22	+1:03.116	33	
27	20	(Italy) Roberto Tamburini	Aprilia	22	+1:05.437	39	
28	90	(Japan) Hiroaki Kuzuhara	Malaguti	22	+1:05.603	36	
29	45	(Hungary) Imre Tóth	Aprilia	22	+1:16.271	29	
30	13	(Italy) Dino Lombardi	Aprilia	22	+1:17.141	38	
31	17	(Germany) Stefan Bradl	KTM	22	+1:39.032	24	
32	81	(Romania) Robert Mureșan	Aprilia	21	+1 lap	42	
33	94	(Netherlands) Patrick van de Waarsenburg	Honda	21	+1 lap	43	
Ret	10	(Spain) Ángel Rodríguez	Aprilia	21	Accident	13	
Ret	44	(Czech Republic) Karel Abraham	Aprilia	21	Accident	35	
Ret	78	(Netherlands) Hugo van den Berg	Aprilia	21	Accident	28	
NC	21	(Spain) Mateo Túnez	Aprilia	20	Finished through pits	23	
Ret	29	(Italy) Andrea Iannone	Aprilia	16	Accident	7	
Ret	32	(Italy) Fabrizio Lai	Honda	11	Retirement	12	
Ret	93	(Netherlands) Gert-Jan Kok	Honda	9	Accident	41	
Ret	7	(France) Alexis Masbou	Malaguti	7	Accident	32	
Ret	12	(Italy) Federico Sandi	Aprilia	7	Accident	31	
Ret	15	(Italy) Michele Pirro	Aprilia	4	Retirement	20	
OFFICIAL 125cc REPORT

== Championship standings after the race (MotoGP) ==
Below are the standings for the top five riders and constructors after round eight has concluded.

Riders' Championship standings

Pos.	Rider	Points
1	(United States) Nicky Hayden	144
2	(Spain) Dani Pedrosa	102
3	(Italy) Loris Capirossi	100
4	(Italy) Valentino Rossi	98
5	(Italy) Marco Melandri	98

Constructors' Championship standings

Pos.	Constructor	Points
1	(Japan) Honda	176
2	(Japan) Yamaha	127
3	(Italy) Ducati	109
4	(Japan) Suzuki	64
5	(Japan) Kawasaki	57

- Note: Only the top five positions are included for both sets of standings.

Previous race: 2006 Catalan Grand Prix	FIM Grand Prix World Championship; 2006 season	Next race: 2006 British Grand Prix
Previous race: 2005 Dutch TT	Dutch TT	Next race: 2007 Dutch TT
