= 2006 Catalan motorcycle Grand Prix =

(Catalonia) 2006 Catalan Grand Prix
Race details
- Race 7 of 17 races in the 2006 Grand Prix motorcycle racing season
- Date: 18 June 2006
- Official name: Gran Premi Cinzano de Catalunya
- Location: Circuit de Catalunya
- Course: Permanent racing facility; 4.727 km (2.937 mi)

MotoGP
Pole position
- Rider: (Italy) Valentino Rossi
- Time: 1:41.855
Fastest lap
- Rider: (United States) Nicky Hayden
- Time: 1:43.048
Podium
- First: (Italy) Valentino Rossi
- Second: (United States) Nicky Hayden
- Third: (United States) Kenny Roberts Jr.

250cc
Pole position
- Rider: (Italy) Andrea Dovizioso
- Time: 1:46.792
Fastest lap
- Rider: (San Marino) Alex de Angelis
- Time: 1:47.327
Podium
- First: (Italy) Andrea Dovizioso
- Second: (Spain) Jorge Lorenzo
- Third: (San Marino) Alex de Angelis

125cc
Pole position
- Rider: (Spain) Álvaro Bautista
- Time: 1:50.281
Fastest lap
- Rider: (Spain) Héctor Faubel
- Time: 1:50.773
Podium
- First: (Spain) Álvaro Bautista
- Second: (Spain) Héctor Faubel
- Third: (Spain) Sergio Gadea

The 2006 Catalan motorcycle Grand Prix was the seventh round of the 2006 MotoGP Championship. It took place on the weekend of 16–18 June 2006 at the Circuit de Catalunya located in Montmeló, Catalonia, Spain.

The MotoGP race was initially red flagged after a crash at the first corner, caused by Loris Capirossi's Ducati making contact with teammate Sete Gibernau's front brake lever. Six riders were involved; John Hopkins, Dani Pedrosa and Randy de Puniet were able to take the restart, while Gibernau, Capirossi and Marco Melandri were not. After the second start was aborted due to an issue with Chris Vermeulen's Suzuki on the grid, the grid reformed for a third time and the race was shortened from 25 laps to 24.

== MotoGP classification ==
Pos.	No.	Rider	Team	Manufacturer	Laps	Time/Retired	Grid	Points
1	46	(Italy) Valentino Rossi	Camel Yamaha Team	Yamaha	24	41:31.237	1	25
2	69	(United States) Nicky Hayden	Repsol Honda Team	Honda	24	+4.509	7	20
3	10	(United States) Kenny Roberts Jr.	Team Roberts	KR211V	24	+9.174	3	16
4	21	(United States) John Hopkins	Rizla Suzuki MotoGP	Suzuki	24	+13.465	2	13
5	5	(United States) Colin Edwards	Camel Yamaha Team	Yamaha	24	+22.548	12	11
6	71	(Australia) Chris Vermeulen	Rizla Suzuki MotoGP	Suzuki	24	+25.198	4	10
7	6	(Japan) Makoto Tamada	Konica Minolta Honda	Honda	24	+30.622	15	9
8	7	(Spain) Carlos Checa	Tech 3 Yamaha	Yamaha	24	+31.277	16	8
9	77	(United Kingdom) James Ellison	Tech 3 Yamaha	Yamaha	24	+59.203	18	7
10	66	(Germany) Alex Hofmann	Pramac d'Antin MotoGP	Ducati	24	+1:14.062	17	6
11	30	(Spain) José Luis Cardoso	Pramac d'Antin MotoGP	Ducati	24	+1:46.815	19	5
Ret	26	(Spain) Dani Pedrosa	Repsol Honda Team	Honda	11	Retirement	11	
Ret	24	(Spain) Toni Elías	Fortuna Honda	Honda	9	Accident	14	
Ret	27	(Australia) Casey Stoner	Honda LCR	Honda	8	Accident	8	
Ret	17	(France) Randy de Puniet	Kawasaki Racing Team	Kawasaki	6	Accident	10	
DSQ	56	(Japan) Shinya Nakano	Kawasaki Racing Team	Kawasaki	6	Ignored ride through penalty	5	
DNS	15	(Spain) Sete Gibernau	Ducati Marlboro Team	Ducati	0	Collision	13	
DNS	33	(Italy) Marco Melandri	Fortuna Honda	Honda	0	Collision	9	
DNS	65	(Italy) Loris Capirossi	Ducati Marlboro Team	Ducati	0	Collision	6	

== 250 cc classification ==
Pos.	No.	Rider	Manufacturer	Laps	Time/Retired	Grid	Points
1	34	(Italy) Andrea Dovizioso	Honda	23	41:28.179	1	25
2	48	(Spain) Jorge Lorenzo	Aprilia	23	+0.095	2	20
3	7	(San Marino) Alex de Angelis	Aprilia	23	+0.422	4	16
4	15	(Italy) Roberto Locatelli	Aprilia	23	+1.587	7	13
5	6	(Spain) Alex Debón	Aprilia	23	+3.136	3	11
6	4	(Japan) Hiroshi Aoyama	KTM	23	+4.032	5	10
7	55	(Japan) Yuki Takahashi	Honda	23	+4.072	9	9
8	50	(France) Sylvain Guintoli	Aprilia	23	+7.315	12	8
9	14	(Australia) Anthony West	Aprilia	23	+43.107	14	7
10	36	(Colombia) Martín Cárdenas	Honda	23	+43.193	18	6
11	54	(San Marino) Manuel Poggiali	KTM	23	+43.582	15	5
12	8	(Italy) Andrea Ballerini	Aprilia	23	+44.405	13	4
13	16	(France) Jules Cluzel	Aprilia	23	+52.426	11	3
14	23	(Spain) Arturo Tizón	Honda	23	+1:05.476	19	2
15	37	(Argentina) Fabricio Perren	Honda	23	+1:08.871	21	1
16	21	(France) Arnaud Vincent	Honda	23	+1:09.556	22	
17	24	(Spain) Jordi Carchano	Aprilia	23	+1:12.913	20	
18	85	(Italy) Alessio Palumbo	Aprilia	23	+1:42.301	23	
19	22	(Italy) Luca Morelli	Aprilia	23	+1:47.629	26	
Ret	9	(Italy) Franco Battaini	Aprilia	17	Retirement	16	
Ret	45	(United Kingdom) Dan Linfoot	Honda	16	Accident	25	
Ret	58	(Italy) Marco Simoncelli	Gilera	12	Accident	10	
Ret	17	(Germany) Franz Aschenbrenner	Aprilia	9	Accident	24	
Ret	96	(Czech Republic) Jakub Smrž	Aprilia	7	Accident	8	
Ret	25	(Italy) Alex Baldolini	Aprilia	6	Retirement	17	
Ret	73	(Japan) Shuhei Aoyama	Honda	3	Accident	6	
WD	19	(Argentina) Sebastián Porto	Honda		Withdrew		
OFFICIAL 250cc REPORT

== 125 cc classification ==
Pos.	No.	Rider	Manufacturer	Laps	Time/Retired	Grid	Points
1	19	(Spain) Álvaro Bautista	Aprilia	22	40:56.370	1	25
2	55	(Spain) Héctor Faubel	Aprilia	22	+0.187	4	20
3	33	(Spain) Sergio Gadea	Aprilia	22	+0.423	11	16
4	75	(Italy) Mattia Pasini	Aprilia	22	+1.094	5	13
5	52	(Czech Republic) Lukáš Pešek	Derbi	22	+2.235	7	11
6	1	(Switzerland) Thomas Lüthi	Honda	22	+2.400	10	10
7	22	(Spain) Pablo Nieto	Aprilia	22	+15.456	3	9
8	14	(Hungary) Gábor Talmácsi	Honda	22	+15.529	13	8
9	6	(Spain) Joan Olivé	Aprilia	22	+25.259	14	7
10	32	(Italy) Fabrizio Lai	Honda	22	+25.441	12	6
11	18	(Spain) Nicolás Terol	Derbi	22	+26.400	9	5
12	35	(Italy) Raffaele De Rosa	Aprilia	22	+31.589	16	4
13	42	(Spain) Pol Espargaró	Derbi	22	+33.772	27	3
14	43	(Spain) Manuel Hernández	Aprilia	22	+34.256	28	2
15	8	(Italy) Lorenzo Zanetti	Aprilia	22	+36.214	17	1
16	38	(United Kingdom) Bradley Smith	Honda	22	+36.238	20	
17	29	(Italy) Andrea Iannone	Aprilia	22	+43.693	15	
18	63	(France) Mike Di Meglio	Honda	22	+45.599	23	
19	11	(Germany) Sandro Cortese	Honda	22	+45.636	18	
20	15	(Italy) Michele Pirro	Aprilia	22	+1:00.138	26	
21	44	(Czech Republic) Karel Abraham	Aprilia	22	+1:00.230	30	
22	12	(Italy) Federico Sandi	Aprilia	22	+1:00.316	34	
23	26	(Switzerland) Vincent Braillard	Aprilia	22	+1:00.776	37	
24	21	(Spain) Mateo Túnez	Aprilia	22	+1:06.141	25	
25	23	(Italy) Lorenzo Baroni	Honda	22	+1:06.225	22	
26	13	(Italy) Dino Lombardi	Aprilia	22	+1:09.129	24	
27	45	(Hungary) Imre Tóth	Aprilia	22	+1:09.168	31	
28	78	(Netherlands) Hugo van den Berg	Aprilia	22	+1:15.393	38	
29	37	(Netherlands) Joey Litjens	Honda	22	+1:30.456	35	
30	20	(Italy) Roberto Tamburini	Aprilia	22	+1:54.277	40	
Ret	16	(Italy) Michele Conti	Honda	13	Retirement	33	
Ret	41	(Spain) Aleix Espargaró	Honda	8	Retirement	21	
Ret	10	(Spain) Ángel Rodríguez	Aprilia	8	Retirement	39	
Ret	36	(Finland) Mika Kallio	KTM	2	Accident	2	
Ret	24	(Italy) Simone Corsi	Gilera	2	Accident	8	
Ret	60	(Spain) Julián Simón	KTM	2	Accident	6	
Ret	53	(Italy) Simone Grotzkyj	Aprilia	0	Retirement	29	
Ret	7	(France) Alexis Masbou	Malaguti	0	Accident	32	
Ret	34	(Spain) Esteve Rabat	Honda	0	Accident	19	
Ret	9	(Austria) Michael Ranseder	KTM	0	Accident	36	
DNS	71	(Japan) Tomoyoshi Koyama	Malaguti		Did not start		
DNQ	76	(Spain) Iván Maestro	Honda		Did not qualify		
DNQ	39	(United Kingdom) Danny Webb	Honda		Did not qualify		
WD	17	(Germany) Stefan Bradl	KTM		Withdrew		
OFFICIAL 125cc REPORT

== Championship standings after the race (MotoGP) ==
Below are the standings for the top five riders and constructors after round seven has concluded.

Riders' Championship standings

Pos.	Rider	Points
1	(United States) Nicky Hayden	119
2	(Italy) Loris Capirossi	99
3	(Italy) Valentino Rossi	90
4	(Italy) Marco Melandri	89
5	(Spain) Dani Pedrosa	86

Constructors' Championship standings

Pos.	Constructor	Points
1	(Japan) Honda	151
2	(Japan) Yamaha	119
3	(Italy) Ducati	105
4	(Japan) Suzuki	54
5	(United States) KR211V	44

- Note: Only the top five positions are included for both sets of standings.

Previous race: 2006 Italian Grand Prix	FIM Grand Prix World Championship; 2006 season	Next race: 2006 Dutch TT
Previous race: 2005 Catalan Grand Prix	Catalan motorcycle Grand Prix	Next race: 2007 Catalan Grand Prix
