= 2006 British motorcycle Grand Prix =

(United Kingdom) 2006 British Grand Prix
Race details
- Race 9 of 17 races in the 2006 Grand Prix motorcycle racing season
- Date: 2 July 2006
- Official name: GAS British Grand Prix
- Location: Donington Park
- Course: Permanent racing facility; 4.023 km (2.500 mi)

MotoGP
Pole position
- Rider: (Spain) Dani Pedrosa
- Time: 1:27.676
Fastest lap
- Rider: (Spain) Dani Pedrosa
- Time: 1:28.714
Podium
- First: (Spain) Dani Pedrosa
- Second: (Italy) Valentino Rossi
- Third: (Italy) Marco Melandri

250cc
Pole position
- Rider: (Spain) Jorge Lorenzo
- Time: 1:31.659
Fastest lap
- Rider: (Italy) Andrea Dovizioso
- Time: 1:33.029
Podium
- First: (Spain) Jorge Lorenzo
- Second: (San Marino) Alex de Angelis
- Third: (Japan) Hiroshi Aoyama

125cc
Pole position
- Rider: (Spain) Álvaro Bautista
- Time: 1:36.203
Fastest lap
- Rider: (Spain) Álvaro Bautista
- Time: 1:37.312
Podium
- First: (Spain) Álvaro Bautista
- Second: (Finland) Mika Kallio
- Third: (Italy) Mattia Pasini

The 2006 British motorcycle Grand Prix was the ninth round of the 2006 MotoGP Championship. It took place on the weekend of 30 June – 2 July 2006 at the Donington Park circuit.

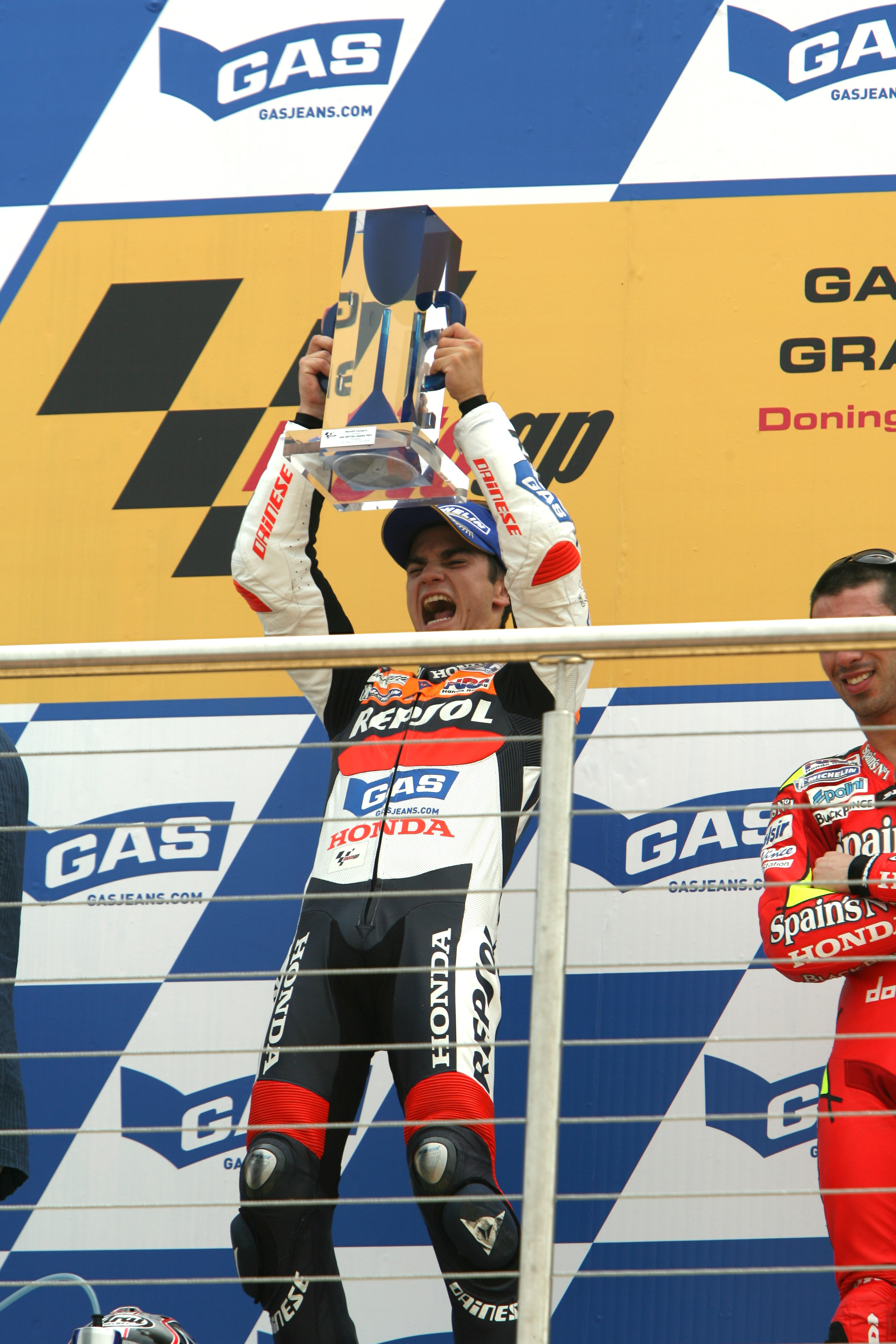
Dani Pedrosa, lifting his trophy on the podium after winning the MotoGP race.

== MotoGP classification ==
Pos.	No.	Rider	Team	Manufacturer	Laps	Time/Retired	Grid	Points
1	26	(Spain) Dani Pedrosa	Repsol Honda Team	Honda	30	44:54.878	1	25
2	46	(Italy) Valentino Rossi	Camel Yamaha Team	Yamaha	30	+3.864	12	20
3	33	(Italy) Marco Melandri	Fortuna Honda	Honda	30	+4.016	3	16
4	27	(Australia) Casey Stoner	Honda LCR	Honda	30	+5.776	8	13
5	10	(United States) Kenny Roberts Jr.	Team Roberts	KR211V	30	+9.596	9	11
6	5	(United States) Colin Edwards	Camel Yamaha Team	Yamaha	30	+21.710	10	10
7	69	(United States) Nicky Hayden	Repsol Honda Team	Honda	30	+25.764	11	9
8	21	(United States) John Hopkins	Rizla Suzuki MotoGP	Suzuki	30	+29.034	4	8
9	65	(Italy) Loris Capirossi	Ducati Marlboro Team	Ducati	30	+35.606	5	7
10	7	(Spain) Carlos Checa	Tech 3 Yamaha	Yamaha	30	+40.442	13	6
11	6	(Japan) Makoto Tamada	Konica Minolta Honda	Honda	30	+41.062	14	5
12	17	(France) Randy de Puniet	Kawasaki Racing Team	Kawasaki	30	+42.197	6	4
13	66	(Germany) Alex Hofmann	Ducati Marlboro Team	Ducati	30	+51.454	15	3
14	77	(United Kingdom) James Ellison	Tech 3 Yamaha	Yamaha	30	+1:17.804	16	2
15	30	(Spain) José Luis Cardoso	Pramac d'Antin MotoGP	Ducati	29	+1 lap	18	1
16	71	(Australia) Chris Vermeulen	Rizla Suzuki MotoGP	Suzuki	29	+1 lap	2	
Ret	56	(Japan) Shinya Nakano	Kawasaki Racing Team	Kawasaki	13	Retirement	7	
Ret	22	(Spain) Iván Silva	Pramac d'Antin MotoGP	Ducati	5	Retirement	17	
WD	84	(Italy) Michel Fabrizio	Fortuna Honda	Honda		Withdrew		

== 250 cc classification ==
Pos.	No.	Rider	Manufacturer	Laps	Time/Retired	Grid	Points
1	48	(Spain) Jorge Lorenzo	Aprilia	27	42:16.321	1	25
2	7	(San Marino) Alex de Angelis	Aprilia	27	+6.257	4	20
3	4	(Japan) Hiroshi Aoyama	KTM	27	+7.366	3	16
4	15	(Italy) Roberto Locatelli	Aprilia	27	+14.788	7	13
5	80	(Spain) Héctor Barberá	Aprilia	27	+20.341	6	11
6	34	(Italy) Andrea Dovizioso	Honda	27	+23.010	2	10
7	55	(Japan) Yuki Takahashi	Honda	27	+23.644	11	9
8	50	(France) Sylvain Guintoli	Aprilia	27	+26.070	13	8
9	14	(Australia) Anthony West	Aprilia	27	+31.575	12	7
10	58	(Italy) Marco Simoncelli	Gilera	27	+41.298	9	6
11	96	(Czech Republic) Jakub Smrž	Aprilia	27	+48.440	10	5
12	42	(Spain) Aleix Espargaró	Honda	27	+1:02.743	16	4
13	73	(Japan) Shuhei Aoyama	Honda	27	+1:03.564	5	3
14	16	(France) Jules Cluzel	Aprilia	27	+1:06.165	18	2
15	8	(Italy) Andrea Ballerini	Aprilia	27	+1:06.461	14	1
16	25	(Italy) Alex Baldolini	Aprilia	27	+1:06.818	20	
17	23	(Spain) Arturo Tizón	Honda	27	+1:09.129	17	
18	9	(Italy) Franco Battaini	Aprilia	27	+1:09.498	15	
19	22	(Italy) Luca Morelli	Aprilia	26	+1 lap	22	
20	17	(Germany) Franz Aschenbrenner	Aprilia	26	+1 lap	24	
21	67	(Sweden) Nicklas Cajback	Aprilia	26	+1 lap	27	
Ret	54	(San Marino) Manuel Poggiali	KTM	23	Accident	8	
Ret	24	(Spain) Jordi Carchano	Aprilia	22	Retirement	25	
Ret	37	(Argentina) Fabricio Perren	Honda	17	Accident	19	
Ret	45	(United Kingdom) Dan Linfoot	Honda	4	Accident	21	
Ret	57	(United Kingdom) Chaz Davies	Honda	2	Accident	23	
Ret	75	(United Kingdom) Luke Lawrence	Yamaha	2	Accident	26	
DNQ	76	(United Kingdom) Alex Kenchington	Yamaha		Did not qualify		
DNQ	77	(United Kingdom) Ian Gardner	Yamaha		Did not qualify		
OFFICIAL 250cc REPORT

== 125 cc classification ==
Pos.	No.	Rider	Manufacturer	Laps	Time/Retired	Grid	Points
1	19	(Spain) Álvaro Bautista	Aprilia	25	40:49.054	1	25
2	36	(Finland) Mika Kallio	KTM	25	+3.454	2	20
3	75	(Italy) Mattia Pasini	Aprilia	25	+3.499	3	16
4	55	(Spain) Héctor Faubel	Aprilia	25	+14.869	6	13
5	33	(Spain) Sergio Gadea	Aprilia	25	+17.032	5	11
6	6	(Spain) Joan Olivé	Aprilia	25	+20.683	8	10
7	52	(Czech Republic) Lukáš Pešek	Derbi	25	+22.286	7	9
8	1	(Switzerland) Thomas Lüthi	Honda	25	+24.899	10	8
9	18	(Spain) Nicolás Terol	Derbi	25	+25.138	9	7
10	14	(Hungary) Gábor Talmácsi	Honda	25	+25.276	15	6
11	32	(Italy) Fabrizio Lai	Honda	25	+28.254	11	5
12	38	(United Kingdom) Bradley Smith	Honda	25	+30.064	13	4
13	24	(Italy) Simone Corsi	Gilera	25	+37.120	4	3
14	11	(Germany) Sandro Cortese	Honda	25	+38.214	14	2
15	8	(Italy) Lorenzo Zanetti	Aprilia	25	+38.592	16	1
16	63	(France) Mike Di Meglio	Honda	25	+39.964	30	
17	29	(Italy) Andrea Iannone	Aprilia	25	+45.145	18	
18	9	(Austria) Michael Ranseder	KTM	25	+45.146	19	
19	10	(Spain) Ángel Rodríguez	Aprilia	25	+48.066	17	
20	54	(Switzerland) Randy Krummenacher	KTM	25	+52.668	25	
21	21	(Spain) Mateo Túnez	Aprilia	25	+53.161	20	
22	26	(Switzerland) Vincent Braillard	Aprilia	25	+53.581	32	
23	12	(Italy) Federico Sandi	Aprilia	25	+58.185	26	
24	53	(Italy) Simone Grotzkyj	Aprilia	25	+1:01.101	35	
25	16	(Italy) Michele Conti	Honda	25	+1:05.686	29	
26	90	(Japan) Hiroaki Kuzuhara	Malaguti	25	+1:05.836	39	
27	23	(Italy) Lorenzo Baroni	Honda	25	+1:10.078	28	
28	44	(Czech Republic) Karel Abraham	Aprilia	25	+1:12.056	27	
29	20	(Italy) Roberto Tamburini	Aprilia	25	+1:38.823	24	
30	66	(United Kingdom) Anthony Rogers	Honda	24	+1 lap	43	
31	67	(Australia) Blake Leigh-Smith	Honda	24	+1 lap	41	
32	95	(Germany) Georg Fröhlich	Malaguti	24	+1 lap	33	
33	65	(United Kingdom) Kyle Kentish	Honda	24	+1 lap	42	
Ret	96	(United Kingdom) Daniel Cooper	Honda	23	Retirement	38	
Ret	15	(Italy) Michele Pirro	Aprilia	13	Retirement	36	
Ret	22	(Spain) Pablo Nieto	Aprilia	13	Retirement	21	
Ret	34	(Spain) Esteve Rabat	Honda	10	Accident	22	
Ret	17	(Germany) Stefan Bradl	KTM	3	Retirement	34	
Ret	35	(Italy) Raffaele De Rosa	Aprilia	2	Accident	12	
Ret	43	(Spain) Manuel Hernández	Aprilia	0	Accident	23	
Ret	45	(Hungary) Imre Tóth	Aprilia	0	Accident	31	
Ret	64	(United Kingdom) Alex Lowes	Honda	0	Retirement	40	
NC	13	(Italy) Dino Lombardi	Aprilia	25	+1:48.750	37	
DNS	37	(Netherlands) Joey Litjens	Honda		Did not start		
OFFICIAL 125cc REPORT

== Championship standings after the race (MotoGP) ==
Below are the standings for the top five riders and constructors after round nine has concluded.

Riders' Championship standings

Pos.	Rider	Points
1	(United States) Nicky Hayden	153
2	(Spain) Dani Pedrosa	127
3	(Italy) Valentino Rossi	118
4	(Italy) Marco Melandri	114
5	(Italy) Loris Capirossi	107

Constructors' Championship standings

Pos.	Constructor	Points
1	(Japan) Honda	201
2	(Japan) Yamaha	147
3	(Italy) Ducati	116
4	(Japan) Suzuki	72
5	(United States) KR211V	66

- Note: Only the top five positions are included for both sets of standings.

Previous race: 2006 Dutch TT	FIM Grand Prix World Championship; 2006 season	Next race: 2006 German Grand Prix
Previous race: 2005 British Grand Prix	British motorcycle Grand Prix	Next race: 2007 British Grand Prix
