= 2003 German motorcycle Grand Prix =

Round of the MotoGP Championship

(Germany) 2003 German Grand Prix
Race details
- Race 9 of 16 races in the 2003 Grand Prix motorcycle racing season
- Date: 27 July 2003
- Official name: Cinzano Motorrad Grand Prix Deutschland
- Location: Sachsenring
- Course: Permanent racing facility; 3.671 km (2.281 mi)

MotoGP
Pole position
Rider	(Italy) Max Biaggi	Honda
Time	1:23.734	
Fastest lap
Rider	(Italy) Max Biaggi	Honda
Time	1:24.630 on lap 8	
Podium
First	(Spain) Sete Gibernau	Honda
Second	(Italy) Valentino Rossi	Honda
Third	(Australia) Troy Bayliss	Ducati

250cc
Pole position
Rider	(Argentina) Sebastián Porto	Honda
Time	1:25.728	
Fastest lap
Rider	(Spain) Fonsi Nieto	Aprilia
Time	1:26.469 on lap 16	
Podium
First	(Italy) Roberto Rolfo	Honda
Second	(Spain) Fonsi Nieto	Aprilia
Third	(France) Randy de Puniet	Aprilia

125cc
Pole position
Rider	(Italy) Stefano Perugini	Aprilia
Time	1:27.717	
Fastest lap
Rider	(Spain) Pablo Nieto	Aprilia
Time	1:28.490 on lap 7	
Podium
First	(Italy) Stefano Perugini	Aprilia
Second	(Australia) Casey Stoner	Aprilia
Third	(San Marino) Alex de Angelis	Aprilia

The 2003 German motorcycle Grand Prix was the ninth round of the 2003 MotoGP Championship. It took place on the weekend of 25–27 July 2003 at the Sachsenring.

== MotoGP race report ==
This race was most notable for the titanic battle between Valentino Rossi and Sete Gibernau, with the Spaniard narrowly winning after a dramatic finale.

Valentino Rossi leads the standings with 187 points, followed by Sete Gibernau with 158 and Max Biaggi with 130 points.

Max Biaggi took pole position on Saturday - his second of the season - with Jeremy McWilliams only +0.002 seconds behind him in second. Loris Capirossi lined up third and Valentino Rossi in fourth, who suffered from a cold as well as tyre problems. Sete Gibernau took fifth place, with Troy Bayliss lining up in sixth, Carlos Checa in seventh and Tohru Ukawa in eighth place. Chris Burns will not be taking part in the race, after being declared unfit due to his collarbone fracture after a crash in the previous British race two weeks ago.

The pack make their way back to their respective starting positions and as the lights go out, Rossi makes a great start and moves up into the lead at Turn 1, followed by the two Ducati's of Capirossi and Bayliss. Gibernau moved up one spot to take fourth, Melandri moved from twelfth to fifth. McWilliams and pole sitter Biaggi had terrible starts, dropping from second to sixth and from first to ninth. At Turn 13, Gibernau dives down the inside of Bayliss to take third from him. Olivier Jacque did likewise and overtook both Biaggi and Nobuatsu Aoki by going side by side with them at the short straight before Turn 13, finalising the move at the entrance after Biaggi went wide.

As lap two begins, Bayliss tries to use the superior Ducati top speed to pass Gibernau at the start/finish straight, almost bumping into him as a result. He isn't able to finalise the move and stays behind for the time being. The top six is as follows: Rossi, Capirossi, Gibernau, Bayliss, Melandri and McWilliams. Going down into Turn 1, Melandri takes fourth by going up his inside at the end of the start/finish straight. Jacque has also made up ten places on the opening lap, going from eighteenth to eighth place. Rossi opens up a gap to Capirossi during the lap. Rossi's teammate and rookie Nicky Hayden tries to pass Aoki at Turn 14 but runs the bike too deep, allowing the Japanese rider to make the cutback and retake twelfth position.

Lap three and Bayliss has a big moment as he brakes for Turn 1, almost going sideways as a result. Gibernau and Melandri put some serious pressure on Capirossi, who is struggling a bit. Just as Gibernau makes his move going down at the short straight before Turn 13, Melandri does the same, overtaking both Gibernau and Capirossi and moving from fourth to second, with Gibernau also taking third from Capirossi. Gibernau then takes second at the braking zone at Turn 14, moving up into second place as a result.

As lap four begins, Melandri goes side by side with Gibernau, taking second back from the Spaniard after he outbraked him. Right behind the duo, Bayliss closes up and tries to take fourth place from his teammate Capirossi around the outside of Turn 1, but goes wide and has to slow back behind him. This fighting has allowed Rossi to ride away, creating a huge gap to the second rider. Gibernau is still all over the back of Melandri, with the Telefónica Movistar Honda rider overtaking Melandri at the left-hand kink at Turn 9 for second.Biaggi meanwhile has passed Jacque for eighth place further back, then taking McWilliams for seventh before the entrance of Turn 13. At Turn 14, Bayliss overtakes Capirossi and moves up into fourth position as he goes down his inside.

On lap five, Gibernau slowly starts to ride away from Melandri. Biaggi - who has been slowly making up the lost ground - is now right behind his Camel Pramac Pons teammate Ukawa and overtakes him at the fast right-handed Turn 12 effortlessly, moving him up to sixth. Bayliss also takes third spot from Melandri by going up his inside at Turn 14.

Lap six and Melandri tries to get back at the Australian by trying a very late lunge down his inside, only narrowly avoiding the Ducati rider as they go down into Turn 1. Exiting Turn 4, it looks like Melandri managed to grab the position back, but Bayliss still managed to stay in front after he went a bit wide. Biaggi also takes fifth position from Capirossi at Turn 13. Hayden passes McWilliams for eleventh at Turn 14 by going up the inside of the Northern Irishman before the climb back up to the start/finish straight.

On lap seven, Biaggi quickly catches up to Melandri. He takes third from him as he outbreaks the Italian going into Turn 13.

Going into lap eight, Rossi leads Gibernau by +1.827 seconds. Going into the fast Turn 12, Gibernau had a bit of a wobble but no harm is done. No overtakes happen at the front.

Lap nine and the top six is as follows: Rossi, Gibernau, Bayliss, Biaggi, Melandri and Capirossi. Noriyuki Haga has crashed out at the last corner on the last lap, his bike losing grip going into Turn 14 and sliding out of contention at high speed. The Japanese rider is then seen running onto the track in a dangerous manner, with one of the marshalls trying to stop him but failing to do so. Biaggi meanwhile is closing up on Bayliss at the front.

On lap ten, Biaggi has caught Bayliss for third but is unable to make a move so far.

Lap eleven and the gap Gibernau has to Rossi has been brought down - from +1.827 seconds on lap eight to +1.495 at the beginning of this lap. Biaggi tries to pass Bayliss by going side by side at the straight before Turn 13, then it looked like he had passed him but the Italian ran a bit too wide, allowing Bayliss to dive down the inside at the uphill Turn 14, blocking his way and retaking third place.

As lap twelve starts, Biaggi is still trying to get past Bayliss. At Turn 1, he takes a much shorter inside line and goes side by side with Bayliss exiting the turn, but still doesn't finalise the move going into Turn 2. Biaggi is still hounding the Australian all throughout the lap.

On lap thirteen, Biaggi tries the same move down at Turn 1 but still isn't able to get through. At Turn 4 however, Bayliss goes a bit wide, with the Italian now finally able to pass him by going down his inside, taking third spot from Bayliss.

Lap fourteen and Gibernau is slowly starting to catch Rossi, with the gap on the last lap being +1.165 seconds. At the fast Turn 9, Biaggi loses his bike and crashes out by sliding into the gravel, ending his good comeback. Distraught, he walks off as the marshalls remove the bike from the gravel. This now means that Bayliss has pretty much secured third position. The gap to Rossi has meanwhile been shrinking and is now only +0.873 seconds.

On lap fifteen, Melandri is now forming a train behind him consisting of Capirossi, Checa, Ukawa and - further back - Hayden. Gauloises Yamaha rider Alex Barros is out of the race, crashing out at the end of Turn 1 after fighting with McWilliams for tenth place. The rider is unhurt and walks away in a disappointing manner. At Turn 13, Ukawa tries to make a move but isn't able to but with Checa going wide, he can get side by side with the Spaniard, positioning his Camel Pramac Pons Honda at his inside at Turn 14 and making the move, moving up to sixth place.

As lap sixteen begins, Hayden is now eyeing Checa as well. He looks to be making a move at Turn 1 but instead stays behind for now. At the front, the gap Gibernau has to Rossi has decreased even further and is now only +0.478, which then increases to +0.480 seconds.

Lap seventeen and the gap to Rossi has increased to +0.706, then decreased again to +0.621 seconds.

On lap eighteen, the gap is once again cut and now is only +0.591 seconds, then decreasing again slightly to +0.511 seconds.

Lap nineteen and Gibernau just puts the fastest lap of the race with a 1:24.8. The gap is +0.364 seconds but halfway into the lap, he has caught Rossi and is all over the back of him.

As lap twenty begins, the Spaniard goes side by side with the Repsol Honda rider, even looking at him as they blast down the start/finish straight, with Gibernau taking over the lead at the end of the straight. Rossi tries to fight back but eventually decides to stay behind in second position. Rossi then shadows Gibernau for half the lap, then tries to dive down the inside at Turn 13 with the Spaniard closing the door on him.

On lap twenty-one, Rossi is still all over the back of Gibernau but does not try to make a move. Both riders now start to slide around a bit as the tyres start to wear off.

Lap twenty-two and Rossi looks to be making a move at the downhill Turn 1 hairpin, but thinks better of it and stays behind Gibernau. The Italian is still shadowing Gibernau, maybe trying to pressure him into a mistake.

On lap twenty-three, Rossi is still right behind Gibernau, eyeing him but not making a move yet.

Lap twenty-four and the top six is now as follows: Gibernau, Rossi, Bayliss, Capirossi, Hayden and Ukawa. The top two encounter some backmarkers - who get out of the way causing no problems and Melandri has also crashed out from fourth place. Suzuki Grand Prix Team rider John Hopkins is also standing still in the gravel due to engine problems, coming to a standstill in the gravel in a cloud of expensive smoke.

On lap twenty-five, Hayden is catching the Marlboro Ducati of Capirossi in fourth position, with Ukawa being a distant sixth. The duo up front is still very close to each other, Rossi eyeing Gibernau as both begin to slide around the circuit. Rossi looks to be making a move at Turn 13 but still does not finalise it and sticks behind Gibernau.

Lap twenty-six and no overtakes happened at the front. Rossi is still right on the tail of Gibernau, shadowing his every move.

On lap twenty-seven, the top six is as follows: Gibernau, Rossi, Bayliss, Capirossi, Hayden and Ukawa. Rossi is still eyeing Gibernau, looking up his inside at Turn 9 but still staying behind.

Lap twenty-eight - the penultimate lap - and Rossi is still waiting for the right moment to pass. He's all over the back of Gibernau, but still does not make a move.

On the final lap - lap twenty-nine - Gibernau opens a slight gap to Rossi at the start/finish straight after the Italian made a small error exiting Turn 14. Rossi however almost immediately catches back up to him and, after a lot of waiting lap after lap, he finally overtakes Gibernau exiting Turn 12, going side by side with him at the straight and finalising the pass going into Turn 13. Many thought that Rossi had secured the race win, but as he closed off the inside to prevent Gibernau from making a final move, the Spaniard instead took a very wide line going into Turn 14. Using the superior traction and exit speed, he blasted past Rossi - just enough to win the race by a mere +0.060 seconds. Just as Rossi wanted to start the celebrations, he sees that Gibernau pipped him on the line, with the Spaniard erupting into joy as he just realised he won the race, with his pit wall doing likewise. Bayliss came home in a lonely third, doing a wheelie in the process, Capirossi in fourth, Hayden in fifth and Ukawa in sixth. This win was Gibernau's fourth and last of the season, and Rossi's second place now meant that he has a winless streak of four races.

On the parade lap back to parc-fermé, he stops at the edge of the track next to the pits, with two of his pit crew members coming up to him to celebrate his victory. The Repsol Honda pitwall meanwhile, looked on in disbelief as to what just happened. As Gibernau celebrates in absolute glee, Rossi is unhappy and does not wave at the celebrating marshalls or the crowd, choosing to immediately ride back to parc-fermé.

At parc-fermé, Bayliss gets a hug from one of the Ducati crewmembers, with a disappointed Rossi looking down and probably thinking to himself what just happened. As Gibernau arrives, he gets a lot of hugs from his team as he celebrates on, still hardly believing he just beat Rossi. Bayliss is already being interviewed by the press meanwhile.

The trio is announced, with Troy Bayliss the first to step onto the podium, followed by a bitterly disappointed Rossi and a jubilant Gibernau, with the audience applauding both Rossi and Gibernau. On the podium, Rossi shakes hands with Bayliss, with Gibernau doing likewise to Rossi and Bayliss as he comes onto it.

The important figures hand out the trophies - with the fans of Gibernau wildly celebrating as he receives his trophy - and dedicates his victory to the Japanese rider Daijiro Kato, who died after a freak accident in the opening round in Japan. The Spanish national anthem plays and the riders spray the champagne on the podium once the grid girls hand them the bottles, Rossi cheekily spraying one of the girls before spraying the rest of the podium finishers. The trio then bunches up for the group photo.

Gibernau's win now meant that he is still in the championship hunt. Rossi still leads with 187 points, followed by Gibernau with 158 (29 points behind) and Max Biaggi with a now distant 130 points (57 points behind).

== MotoGP classification ==
Pos.	No.	Rider	Team	Manufacturer	Laps	Time/Retired	Grid	Points
1	15	(Spain) Sete Gibernau	Telefónica Movistar Honda	Honda	30	42:41.180	5	25
2	46	(Italy) Valentino Rossi	Repsol Honda	Honda	30	+0.060	4	20
3	12	(Australia) Troy Bayliss	Ducati Marlboro Team	Ducati	30	+13.207	6	16
4	65	(Italy) Loris Capirossi	Ducati Marlboro Team	Ducati	30	+16.521	3	13
5	69	(United States) Nicky Hayden	Repsol Honda	Honda	30	+16.563	15	11
6	11	(Japan) Tohru Ukawa	Camel Pramac Pons	Honda	30	+18.743	8	10
7	56	(Japan) Shinya Nakano	d'Antín Yamaha Team	Yamaha	30	+18.885	10	9
8	7	(Spain) Carlos Checa	Fortuna Yamaha Team	Yamaha	30	+26.165	7	8
9	19	(France) Olivier Jacque	Gauloises Yamaha Team	Yamaha	30	+28.281	18	7
10	17	(Japan) Norifumi Abe	Yamaha Racing Team	Yamaha	30	+29.159	16	6
11	9	(Japan) Nobuatsu Aoki	Proton Team KR	Proton KR	30	+29.316	9	5
12	99	(United Kingdom) Jeremy McWilliams	Proton Team KR	Proton KR	30	+30.427	2	4
13	6	(Japan) Makoto Tamada	Pramac Honda	Honda	30	+49.580	19	3
14	45	(United States) Colin Edwards	Alice Aprilia Racing	Aprilia	30	+53.444	13	2
15	10	(United States) Kenny Roberts Jr.	Suzuki Grand Prix Team	Suzuki	30	+57.512	14	1
16	8	(Australia) Garry McCoy	Kawasaki Racing Team	Kawasaki	30	+59.580	20	
17	66	(Germany) Alex Hofmann	Kawasaki Racing Team	Kawasaki	30	+1:05.240	21	
18	23	(Japan) Ryuichi Kiyonari	Telefónica Movistar Honda	Honda	30	+1:05.348	23	
19	88	(Australia) Andrew Pitt	Kawasaki Racing Team	Kawasaki	29	+1 lap	24	
20	52	(Spain) David de Gea	WCM	Sabre V4	29	+1 lap	25	
Ret	33	(Italy) Marco Melandri	Fortuna Yamaha Team	Yamaha	23	Accident	12	
Ret	21	(United States) John Hopkins	Suzuki Grand Prix Team	Suzuki	23	Retirement	22	
Ret	4	(Brazil) Alex Barros	Gauloises Yamaha Team	Yamaha	15	Accident	11	
Ret	3	(Italy) Max Biaggi	Camel Pramac Pons	Honda	13	Accident	1	
Ret	41	(Japan) Noriyuki Haga	Alice Aprilia Racing	Aprilia	7	Accident	17	
WD	35	(United Kingdom) Chris Burns	WCM	ROC Yamaha		Withdrew		

== 250 cc classification ==
Pos.	No.	Rider	Manufacturer	Laps	Time/Retired	Grid	Points
1	3	(Italy) Roberto Rolfo	Honda	29	42:06.199	2	25
2	10	(Spain) Fonsi Nieto	Aprilia	29	+0.150	4	20
3	7	(France) Randy de Puniet	Aprilia	29	+0.287	5	16
4	5	(Argentina) Sebastián Porto	Honda	29	+5.305	1	13
5	21	(Italy) Franco Battaini	Aprilia	29	+13.097	3	11
6	14	(Australia) Anthony West	Aprilia	29	+18.289	10	10
7	24	(Spain) Toni Elías	Aprilia	29	+20.881	9	9
8	54	(San Marino) Manuel Poggiali	Aprilia	29	+20.927	6	8
9	6	(Spain) Alex Debón	Honda	29	+45.171	13	7
10	26	(Italy) Alex Baldolini	Aprilia	29	+48.701	12	6
11	28	(Germany) Dirk Heidolf	Aprilia	29	+57.078	18	5
12	57	(United Kingdom) Chaz Davies	Aprilia	29	+57.268	17	4
13	96	(Czech Republic) Jakub Smrž	Honda	29	+57.459	19	3
14	36	(France) Erwan Nigon	Aprilia	29	+1:17.467	14	2
15	62	(Germany) Max Neukirchner	Honda	29	+1:29.139	22	1
16	52	(Czech Republic) Lukáš Pešek	Yamaha	29	+1:29.338	23	
17	11	(Spain) Joan Olivé	Aprilia	28	+1 lap	11	
18	98	(Germany) Katja Poensgen	Honda	28	+1 lap	29	
19	66	(Finland) Vesa Kallio	Yamaha	28	+1 lap	27	
Ret	63	(Sweden) Tomas Palander	Honda	28	Accident	25	
Ret	18	(Netherlands) Henk vd Lagemaat	Honda	27	Accident	26	
Ret	65	(Germany) Norman Rank	Honda	25	Retirement	28	
Ret	34	(France) Eric Bataille	Honda	24	Accident	21	
Ret	50	(France) Sylvain Guintoli	Aprilia	21	Accident	8	
Ret	16	(Sweden) Johan Stigefelt	Aprilia	9	Accident	20	
Ret	9	(France) Hugo Marchand	Aprilia	3	Retirement	16	
Ret	15	(Germany) Christian Gemmel	Honda	0	Accident	24	
Ret	33	(Spain) Héctor Faubel	Aprilia	0	Accident	15	
Ret	8	(Japan) Naoki Matsudo	Yamaha	0	Accident	7	
DNQ	64	(Germany) Nico Kehrer	Honda		Did not qualify		

== 125 cc classification ==
Pos.	No.	Rider	Manufacturer	Laps	Time/Retired	Grid	Points
1	7	(Italy) Stefano Perugini	Aprilia	27	40:11.124	1	25
2	27	(Australia) Casey Stoner	Aprilia	27	+0.212	5	20
3	15	(San Marino) Alex de Angelis	Aprilia	27	+0.375	2	16
4	3	(Spain) Daniel Pedrosa	Honda	27	+0.774	7	13
5	22	(Spain) Pablo Nieto	Aprilia	27	+5.877	13	11
6	79	(Hungary) Gábor Talmácsi	Aprilia	27	+11.791	17	10
7	34	(Italy) Andrea Dovizioso	Honda	27	+12.070	6	9
8	4	(Italy) Lucio Cecchinello	Aprilia	27	+12.212	4	8
9	24	(Italy) Simone Corsi	Honda	27	+12.645	10	7
10	36	(Finland) Mika Kallio	Honda	27	+16.369	12	6
11	6	(Italy) Mirko Giansanti	Aprilia	27	+16.370	11	5
12	58	(Italy) Marco Simoncelli	Aprilia	27	+16.825	20	4
13	42	(Italy) Gioele Pellino	Aprilia	27	+21.622	16	3
14	80	(Spain) Héctor Barberá	Aprilia	27	+27.161	3	2
15	32	(Italy) Fabrizio Lai	Malaguti	27	+41.028	18	1
16	88	(Denmark) Robbin Harms	Aprilia	27	+45.131	21	
17	23	(Italy) Gino Borsoi	Aprilia	27	+45.377	8	
18	10	(Italy) Roberto Locatelli	KTM	27	+54.576	22	
19	90	(Germany) Dario Giuseppetti	Honda	27	+55.177	29	
20	31	(Spain) Julián Simón	Malaguti	27	+1:11.657	25	
21	48	(Spain) Jorge Lorenzo	Derbi	27	+1:22.753	19	
22	78	(Hungary) Péter Lénárt	Honda	27	+1:36.455	37	
23	21	(United Kingdom) Leon Camier	Honda	26	+1 lap	36	
Ret	19	(Spain) Álvaro Bautista	Aprilia	25	Accident	23	
Ret	12	(Switzerland) Thomas Lüthi	Honda	25	Accident	15	
Ret	41	(Japan) Youichi Ui	Aprilia	23	Accident	14	
Ret	54	(Germany) Patrick Unger	Honda	18	Retirement	35	
Ret	17	(Germany) Steve Jenkner	Aprilia	17	Accident	9	
Ret	8	(Japan) Masao Azuma	Honda	14	Accident	32	
Ret	52	(Germany) Jarno Müller	Honda	14	Retirement	34	
Ret	91	(Germany) Jascha Büch	Honda	12	Accident	30	
Ret	33	(Italy) Stefano Bianco	Gilera	11	Retirement	33	
Ret	1	(France) Arnaud Vincent	KTM	9	Accident	24	
Ret	53	(Germany) Manuel Mickan	Honda	7	Accident	27	
Ret	26	(Spain) Emilio Alzamora	Derbi	7	Retirement	28	
Ret	63	(France) Mike Di Meglio	Aprilia	2	Accident	31	
Ret	25	(Hungary) Imre Tóth	Honda	2	Retirement	26	
DNS	11	(Italy) Max Sabbatani	Aprilia		Did not start		

== Championship standings after the race (MotoGP) ==
Below are the standings for the top five riders and constructors after round nine has concluded.

Riders' Championship standings

Pos.	Rider	Points
1	(Italy) Valentino Rossi	187
2	(Spain) Sete Gibernau	158
3	(Italy) Max Biaggi	130
4	(Italy) Loris Capirossi	97
5	(Australia) Troy Bayliss	80

Constructors' Championship standings

Pos.	Constructor	Points
1	(Japan) Honda	220
2	(Italy) Ducati	129
3	(Japan) Yamaha	102
4	(Italy) Aprilia	54
5	(Malaysia) / (United States) Proton KR	27

- Note: Only the top five positions are included for both sets of standings.

Previous race: 2003 British Grand Prix	FIM Grand Prix World Championship; 2003 season	Next race: 2003 Czech Republic Grand Prix
Previous race: 2002 German Grand Prix	German motorcycle Grand Prix	Next race: 2004 German Grand Prix
