= Casey Stoner =

Australian motorcycle racer (born 1985)

Casey Stoner AM
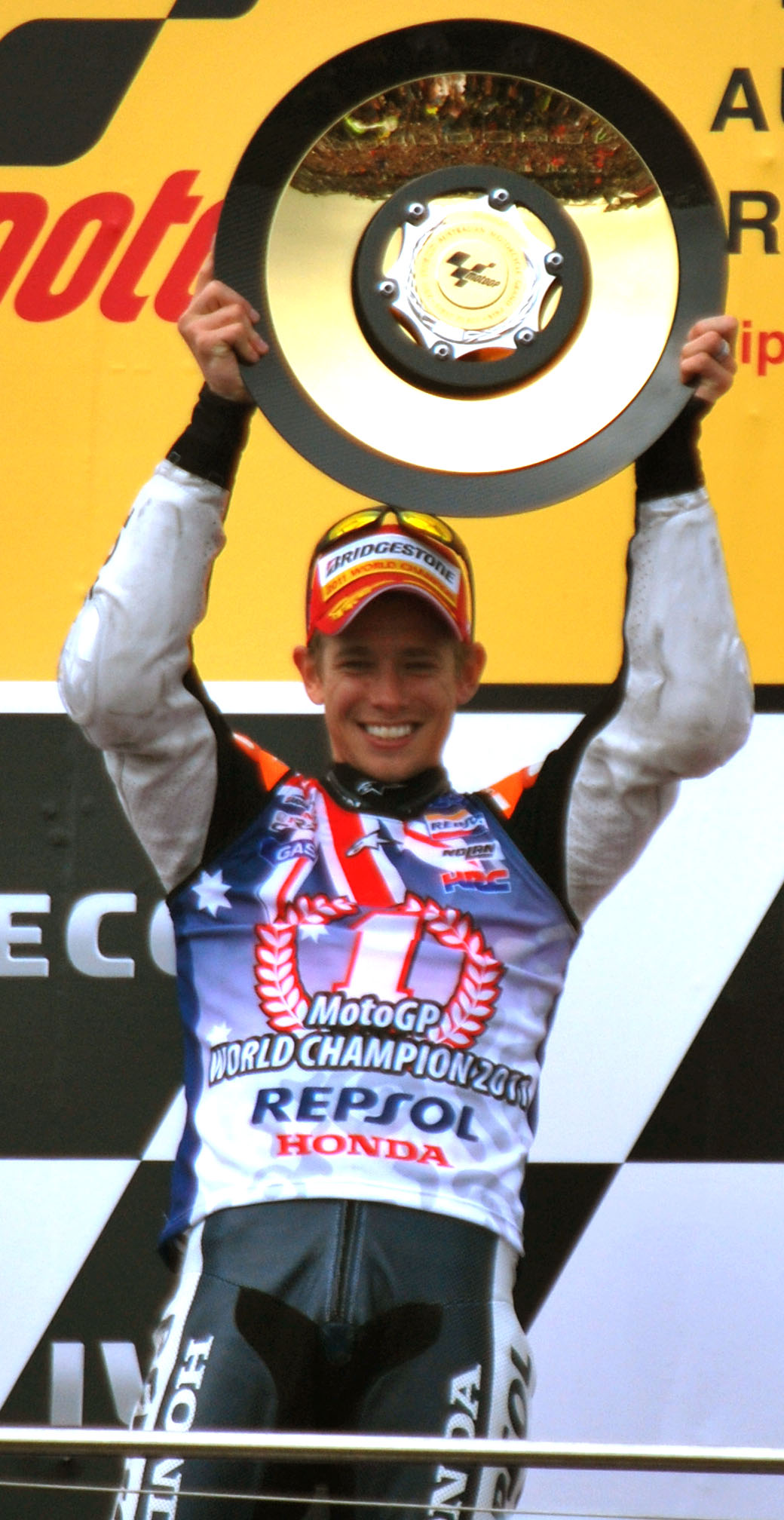
- Stoner at the 2011 Australian Grand Prix
- Nationality: Australian
- Born: 16 October 1985 (age 41); Southport, Queensland, Australia
- Website: caseystoner.com.au
Motorcycle racing career statistics
MotoGP World Championship
| Active years | 2006–2012 |
| Manufacturers | Honda (2006, 2011–2012); Ducati (2007–2010) |
| Championships | 2 (2007, 2011) |
| 2012 championship position | 3rd (254 pts) |
Starts / Wins / Podiums / Poles / F. laps / Points; 115 / 38 / 69 / 39 / 29 / 1815
250cc World Championship
| Active years | 2002, 2005 |
| Manufacturers | Aprilia |
| Championships | 0 |
| 2005 championship position | 2nd (254 pts) |
Starts / Wins / Podiums / Poles / F. laps / Points; 31 / 5 / 10 / 2 / 1 / 322
125cc World Championship
| Active years | 2001, 2003–2004 |
| Manufacturers | Honda (2001); Aprilia (2003); KTM (2004) |
| Championships | 0 |
| 2004 championship position | 5th (145 pts) |
Starts / Wins / Podiums / Poles / F. laps / Points; 30 / 2 / 10 / 2 / 3 / 274

Casey Joel Stoner AM (born 16 October 1985) is an Australian retired professional motorcycle racer, and a two-time MotoGP World Champion, in 2007 and 2011. During his MotoGP career, Stoner raced for the Ducati and Honda factory teams, winning a title for each team.

Born in Southport, Queensland, Stoner took up racing at an early age and moved to the United Kingdom to pursue his career. He joined MotoGP in 2006, riding for the Honda satellite team LCR. He joined the factory Ducati team in 2007 and won the championship. He was Ducati's first MotoGP World Champion, and would remain their only champion until Francesco Bagnaia in 2022. Stoner remained a strong contender on the Ducati in 2008 and 2009, winning multiple races despite the increasing superiority of Yamaha and Honda's bikes. Stoner made a good start to the 2009 season but had to miss three races due to chronic fatigue syndrome. In 2010, Ducati failed to challenge Yamaha and Honda until very late in the season, when Stoner picked up three race wins.

Stoner left Ducati for Honda for the 2011 season. He won a second world championship in dominant fashion, taking ten race wins and sealing the title by winning his home race with two rounds remaining. In 2012, prior to the French Grand Prix, the 27-year-old Stoner unexpectedly announced that he would retire from Grand Prix racing at the end of the season due to burnout. Due to a crash during practice at Indianapolis, Stoner missed several races due to injury, curtailing his last championship challenge. He rounded off his MotoGP career with a remarkable sixth consecutive win in his home Grand Prix at Phillip Island, and a podium in his final race.

On 27 March 2015, HRC announced that Stoner would return to competition for a one-off ride in the 2015 Suzuka 8 Hours. Stoner crashed out of the race due to a stuck throttle, and Honda apologised to Stoner over the technical failure that caused him to injure his ankle and shoulder. Stoner served as a test and development rider for former team Ducati from 2016 to 2018.

== Career ==
=== Early career ===
From 2000 to 2002, Stoner contested the national 125cc GP championships in Britain and Spain, winning the English 125cc Aprilia Championship in 2000, before moving full-time to the 250cc GP World Championships in 2002. His season on an Aprilia under the guidance of Lucio Cecchinello was turbulent, with no podium places from 15 race starts.

=== 250cc World Championship ===
In 2005, Stoner rejoined the 250cc world championship class, racing once again for Lucio Cecchinello's team on a works Aprilia. He emerged toward the season's end as a serious threat to championship leader Dani Pedrosa; a threat that only dissipated with a crash at Stoner's home Grand Prix of Phillip Island, allowing Pedrosa to establish an insurmountable points lead. Stoner went on to claim a solid second place in the overall championship standings, with an impressive five race victories for the season.

=== MotoGP World Championship ===
==== 2006: Rookie season at LCR Honda ====
In October 2005, Stoner, along with Lucio Cecchinello's team, reportedly had an agreement to move to the MotoGP class in the upcoming season with support from Yamaha. After the season ended, he received an offer from the Honda Pons team and tested the Honda RC211V bike with them at Valencia. However, in December 2005, Stoner re-signed with Cecchinello's team after Honda Pons failed to secure sponsorship for the upcoming season. The team then made an agreement with LCR Honda to run the RC211V for Stoner in 2006.

As a rookie satellite rider, Stoner took the pole position in just his second MotoGP race, but crashed several times during the season. He finished in eighth position in the championship, with his best result being a second place at the Turkish Grand Prix. He was leading the race until he was overtaken on the final corner by Marco Melandri.

==== 2007: Championship year with Factory Ducati ====
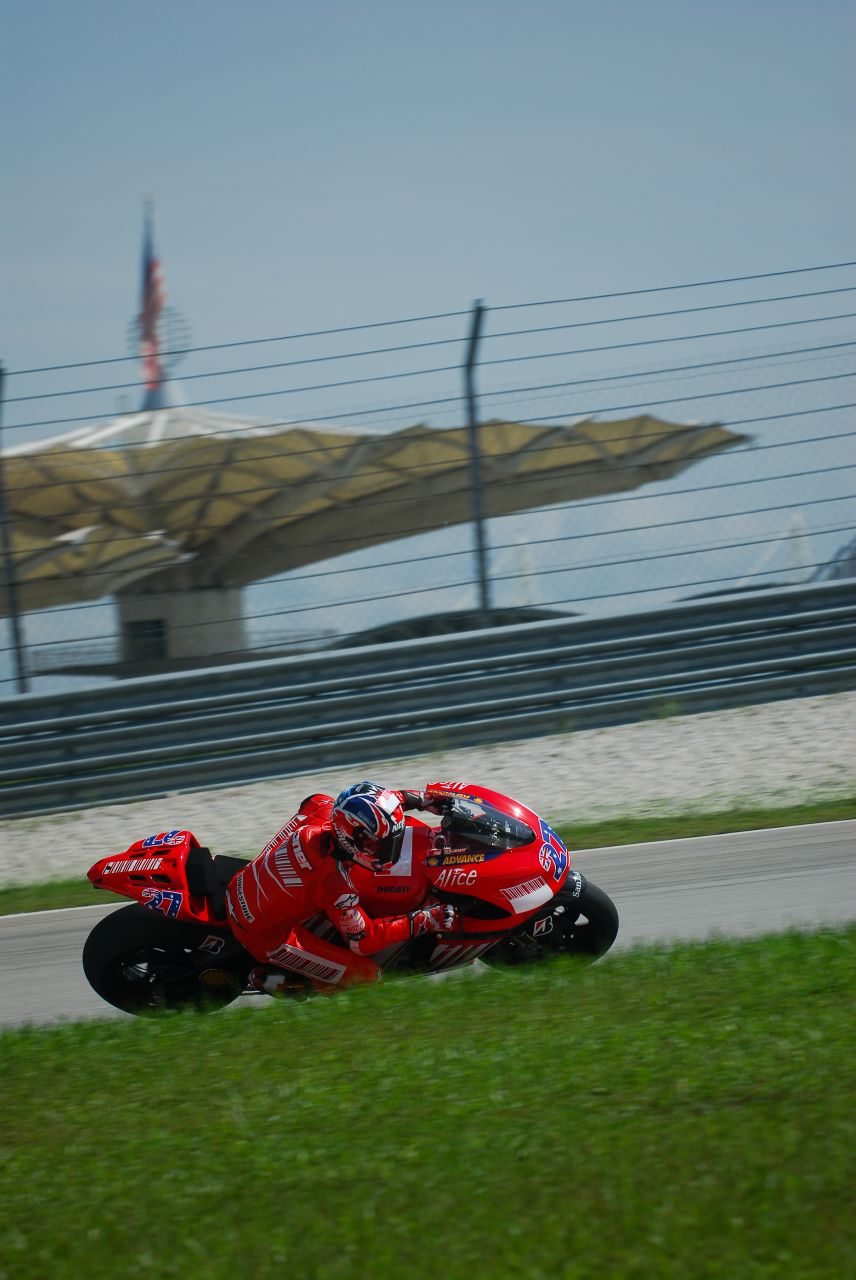
Stoner during the MotoGP pre-season test session at Sepang International Circuit in Malaysia in January 2007.

Stoner secured a ride with the Factory Ducati Team for the 2007 season, joining Loris Capirossi on the new 800cc Ducati Desmosedici GP7. Stoner started off his Ducati career on a high note with a first premier-class win in the Qatar opener, after a tense battle with Valentino Rossi. Stoner took ten race wins and six pole positions (including winning three of the first four), took him to his first GP title, by a margin of 125 points (equivalent to five victories) over Dani Pedrosa, which he built during the second half of the season. His worst finish was a sixth place at Motegi, which was all he needed to clinch the title that day, taking the first premier class title for an Italian or a non-Japanese manufacturer since Phil Read's title for MV Agusta in 1974. Stoner was named Young Australian of the Year for his 2007 performance.

==== 2008: Six wins and runner-up season ====
In 2008, Stoner took the #1 decal on his bike. Stoner opened the 2008 season with a victory at Qatar, before a run of two races without a podium. He returned to the podium with a second place at Mugello, before starting a run of seven successive pole positions. He turned three of them into successive victories—a lights-to-flag win at Donington, leading every lap at Assen six days later, and recovering from a huge Friday crash at Sachsenring to win in the wet after Dani Pedrosa crashed, moving to within 20 points of the championship lead. However, successive crashes while fighting for the lead at Mazda Raceway Laguna Seca (where he remounted to finish second to Valentino Rossi), Brno and Misano ensured that he could not defend the title successfully. Stoner finished the 2008 season with six wins and was runner-up to Rossi with 280 points, the highest number of points ever gained without taking the title at the time.

==== 2009: Health issues and Ducati struggles ====
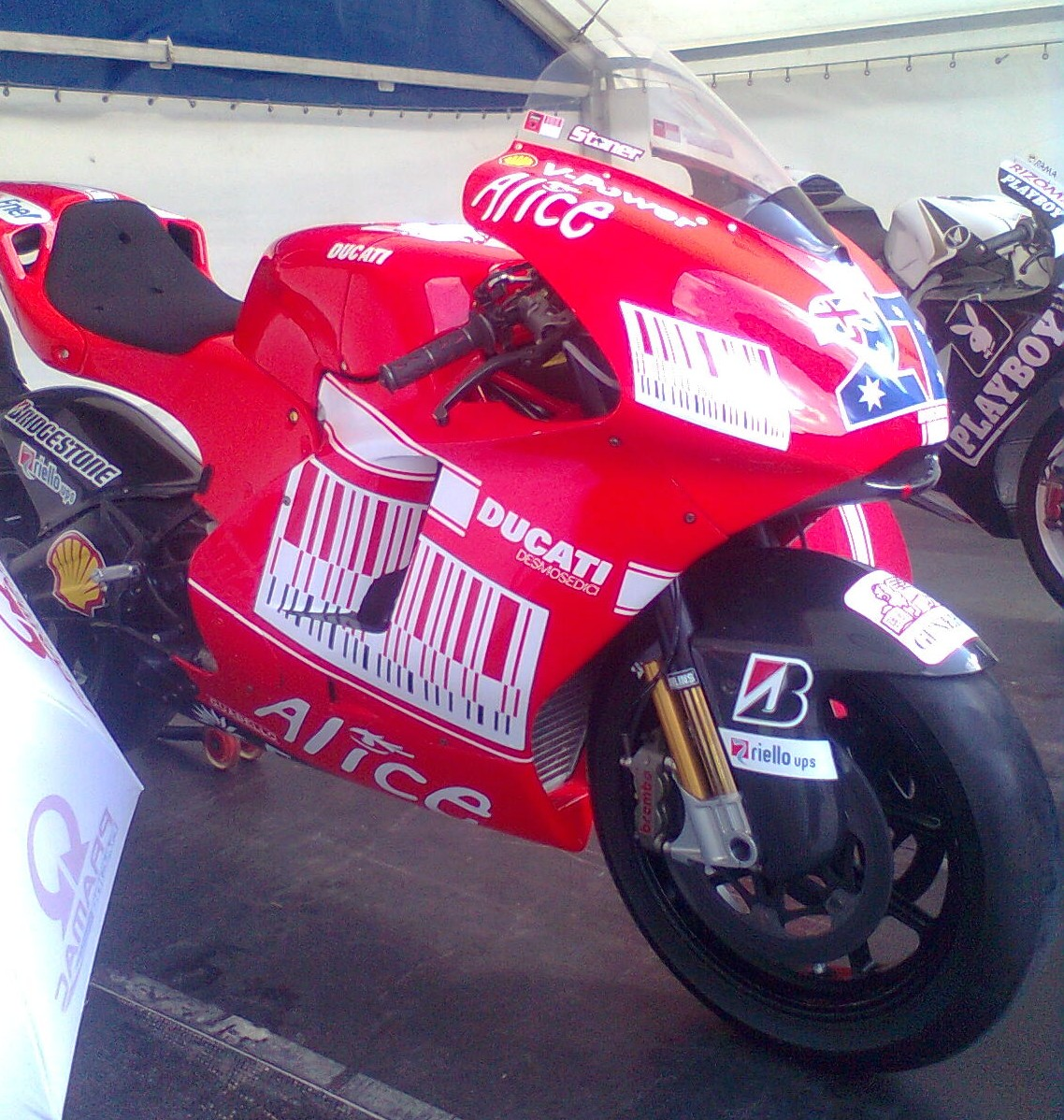
Stoner's bike in Brno

Stoner remained with Ducati for the 2009 season with new teammate Nicky Hayden, with a further option for a fourth season in 2010. A strong start to the season left Stoner in a three-way battle with the Fiat Yamaha duo of Rossi and Jorge Lorenzo, before he was struck by a mystery illness which caused him to feel tired long before the end of races, leaving him 16 points behind Rossi and seven behind Lorenzo after the US Grand Prix at Laguna Seca on 5 July.

Stoner was initially diagnosed with anaemia and an inflammation of the stomach lining. Stoner later disputed the diagnosis, however, and, after continuing to struggle with the condition, he announced on 10 August 2009 that he would miss rounds 11, 12 and 13 in Brno, Indianapolis and Misano, respectively, in an attempt to recover from the illness, he was subsequently diagnosed as lactose intolerant. Mika Kallio was chosen as Stoner's replacement for the three races. Stoner returned to racing late in the 2009 season, placing second in the Portuguese Grand Prix and an emphatic first in the Australian Grand Prix, which he led throughout. In an interview following the Australian Grand Prix, Stoner said that he experienced none of the premature tiredness that had dogged him earlier in the 2009 season. He followed this up with another first place in the wet at the Malaysian Grand Prix. At the last round of 2009 at Valencia, Stoner dominated all practice and qualifying sessions to take pole, only to crash on cold tyres on the warm-up lap and miss the race. Stoner ended the season with four victories, and eight podiums in total, leading to a fourth-place finish in the riders' championship.

==== 2010: Last season riding the Ducati ====
At the test held immediately following the Valencia round, Stoner was once again fastest while testing the new 2010 version of the Desmosedici. However, Rossi was fastest in five of the six pre-season tests. Stoner qualified on pole for the season opener in Qatar, and was leading the race when he crashed out, later acknowledging that this was his own mistake. He also crashed out of round 3 at Le Mans, this time attributing the crash to the front of the bike unloading when not running at maximum pace. His first podium of the year came at Assen, despite struggling with arm pump late in the race.

It was not until the thirteenth race of the season, the inaugural Aragon Grand Prix, that Stoner achieved his first victory. His victory in Aragon started a run of three victories in four races, as he also won the delayed Japanese Grand Prix, and won for the fourth consecutive year at Phillip Island. He eventually finished fourth in the riders' championship once again. With Rossi having fallen out of favour with Yamaha following Lorenzo's championship-winning season and Honda no longer willing to play second fiddle to another Japanese manufacturer, an intense game of musical chairs ensued in the MotoGP paddock that saw several of the top riders switch teams, Stoner among them. For 2011, Stoner joined Honda Racing Corporation after four years at Ducati Corse, where he was replaced by Valentino Rossi.

==== 2011: Return to Honda with the factory team and second championship ====
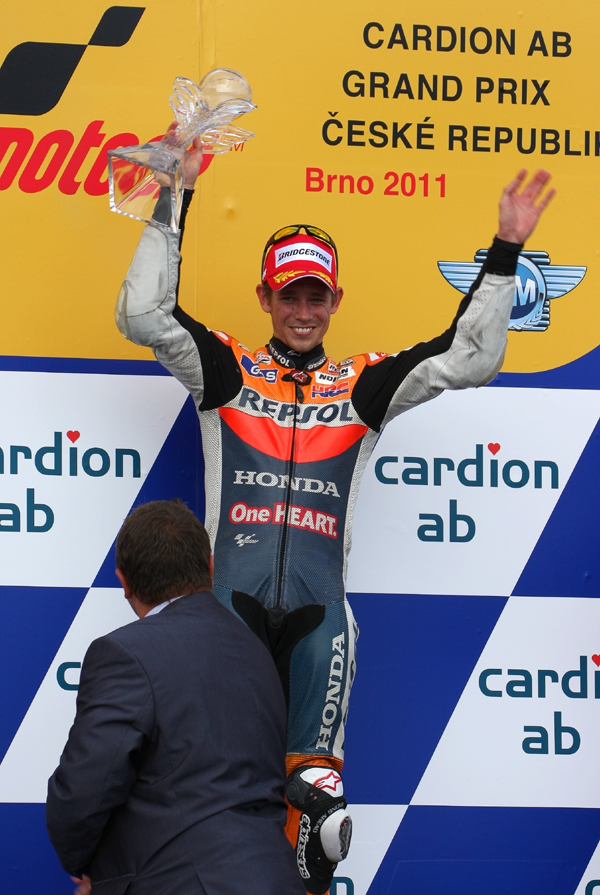
Stoner at the 2011 Czech Grand Prix

Stoner raced with the Repsol Honda Racing Team in 2011, with teammates Dani Pedrosa and Andrea Dovizioso. In preseason testing in Malaysia, Stoner was quickest in all three sessions, closely followed by Pedrosa and reigning world champion Jorge Lorenzo. Stoner won the season-opening race in Qatar from pole position, and had been quickest in each of the free practice sessions held before qualifying. Stoner took pole position for the Spanish Grand Prix, but had been running second behind Marco Simoncelli in wet conditions. Valentino Rossi attempted an overtake on Stoner from a long way back and crashed, taking him down as well. After the race, when Rossi came to his garage to apologise for the incident, Stoner replied with the now-famous line, "Obviously your ambition outweighed your talent. Stoner won three out of the first five rounds of the season, with victories in Le Mans and Catalunya to add to his Qatar victory. Stoner added victories at Silverstone in damp conditions, and Laguna Seca, to hold a 20-point lead over Jorge Lorenzo with eight races to go in the season.

Stoner proposed boycotting the Japanese Grand Prix out of fears for his health from radiation from the Fukushima Daiichi Nuclear Power Plant even though all the independent scientific experts including the World Health Organization and Australian Radiation Protection and Nuclear Safety Agency stated that it is safe to live permanently 80 km (50 mi) or more from the plant.

Stoner won the World Championship for the second time at his home round at Phillip Island, Australia. On his 26th birthday, Stoner won his ninth race of the season from his eleventh pole, and with his only challenger Jorge Lorenzo ruled out of the race due to a hand injury suffered in warm-up, Stoner finished the weekend with an unassailable 65-point lead. His victory in the Australian MotoGP was his fifth in succession in his home race dating back to 2007 which made him the only rider to have won at Phillip Island during the 800cc era of MotoGP. He also was the only rider other than Marc Márquez or Lorenzo in the premier class to have won the championship in the 2010s.

==== 2012: Final season before retirement ====
Stoner started the season with wins at Jerez, and Estoril, both tracks he had not won a MotoGP race at before; his victory in Estoril allowed him to take the championship lead. By finishing fourth at the Catalan Grand Prix, Stoner finished off the podium for the first time in fourteen months. He won the Dutch TT at Assen to move back level on points with Lorenzo, who was taken out by Álvaro Bautista on the first lap. This put Stoner even in points with Lorenzo before a final-lap retirement at the Sachsenring, while battling teammate Dani Pedrosa. Stoner finished only eighth at the Italian Grand Prix after running off-circuit, later describing that he was "not comfortable" on the bike, but followed that up with a fourth win of the season at Laguna Seca.

At the next race, Stoner crashed heavily during the qualifying session for the Indianapolis Grand Prix, suffering torn ligaments in his ankle but was declared fit to race the following day. He finished fourth in the race, 2.5 seconds behind third-placed Andrea Dovizioso. Stoner then elected to have surgery on his ankle, ruling him out of action for three races which essentially put him out of contention for the championship. Stoner's priority then was to be fully recovered for his home race in Australia, and he was slated to return at the Japanese Grand Prix in October. Upon returning, he finished fifth in Japan and third in Malaysia, before winning his home race for the sixth successive season at Phillip Island. The win gave him an undefeated record on Bridgestone tyres at the circuit.

=== Retirement ===
On 17 May 2012, during the pre-event press conference at the French Grand Prix, Stoner announced that he would retire from MotoGP at the end of the 2012 season. He stated that he no longer enjoyed competing in the series, which was one of the contributing factors to his retirement. Getting away from the political stress of MotoGP, as well as having a desire to spend more time leisurely with his family were further reasons for his retirement. In a June 2014 interview, Stoner said he was enjoying his life away from the sport with his family and had no regrets about his retirement, further dismissing any chances of a comeback.

=== Status and personality ===
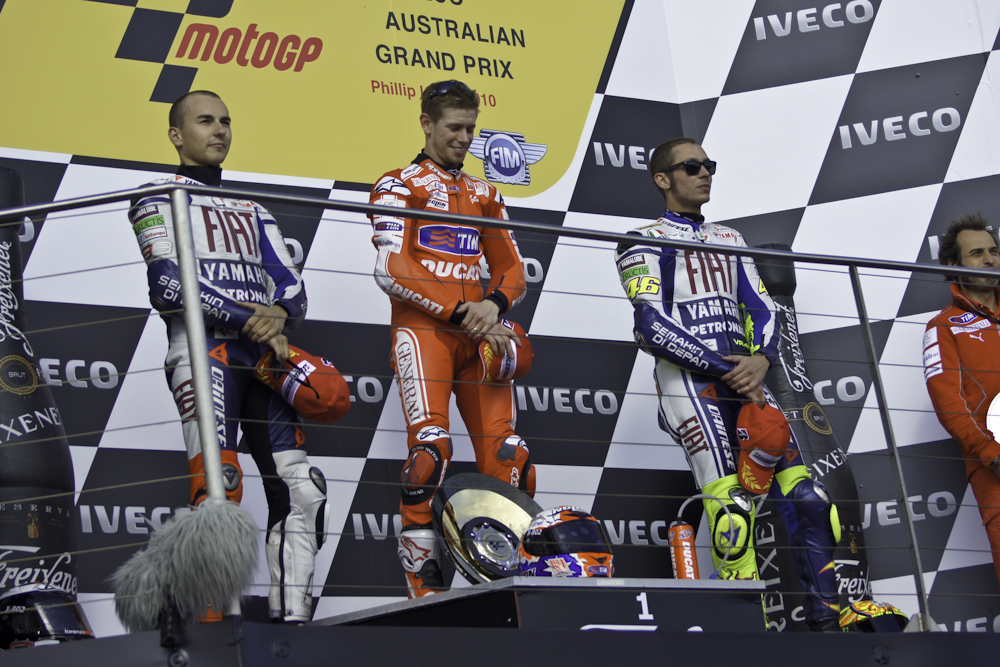
The podium after the 2010 Australian Grand Prix, with Stoner flanked by Jorge Lorenzo and Valentino Rossi

Stoner showed signs of feeling under-appreciated by the general public. He was angered by consistent suggestions that the bike and tyres had a bigger role in his success than he did, and unhappy at being booed at Donington in 2007 and 2008.

In August 2008, Stoner was criticised for his former Ducati team's association with tobacco company Philip Morris.

Stoner has stated that he would prefer to shun the limelight and let his riding style do the talking. In an interview with Australian Motorcycle News, he was quoted as saying he would prefer a return to purer form of racing from the 500cc days, stating that "Back in those days, it was just racing—Doohan, Rainey, Schwantz, Gardner, Lawson—not half as much bullshit as now. That was the life."

Before the 2012 Australian Grand Prix, the Phillip Island Grand Prix Circuit named the third corner "Stoner Corner".

== After retirement ==
=== V8 Supercars ===
After announcing his retirement from MotoGP, rumours persisted throughout the year that Stoner would debut in touring car racing in 2013; specifically the Australian V8 Supercars series. Such a switch is a rare but not unprecedented move; as fellow Australian world motorcycling champion Wayne Gardner retired from motorcycle racing in 1992 and made his touring car debut the following year. The rumours intensified when V8 Supercars team Triple Eight Race Engineering announced that Red Bull, a long-term sponsor of Stoner, would be the major sponsor of the team from 2013 onwards, replacing Vodafone. After numerous denials, in January 2013, Stoner announced that he would indeed move to touring car racing on a one-year contract with Triple Eight Race Engineering. Stoner would race in the second tier Dunlop V8 Supercar Series for the 2013 season.

On 27 February 2013, two days before his debut at the Adelaide Street Circuit, Stoner unveiled his car, sponsored by Red Bull and Pirtek. His car would be a Holden VE Commodore, the same car that was driven to victory in the 2010 Supercheap Auto Bathurst 1000 by Mark Skaife and Craig Lowndes. His cameo season was unsuccessful, finishing in the mid-field most races with a highest finish of fifth at Queensland Raceway. He finished the season 18th in the standings with 704 points.

=== Testing for Repsol Honda ===
In 2013, Stoner signed with Honda as a test rider to aid in the development of new machinery on a limited basis through to the end of the 2014 season. He renewed his contract again in 2015 for another season of test riding through to January 1, 2016.

== Return to motorcycle racing ==
=== Suzuka 8 Hours ===
After three years retired from MotoGP, on 27 March, HRC announced that Stoner was to return to motorcycle racing in 2015. In July, Stoner competed at the Suzuka 8 Hours, where he rode the Honda CBR1000RR. His teammates were World Superbike rider Michael van der Mark and MFJ All Japan Road Race JSB100 Championship and HRC test rider Takumi Takahashi. The team qualified for the race in fourth position. With his team leading the race, Stoner suffered a violent crash due to a throttle malfunction which forced him to dump his bike into a guard barrier. The crash saw their race come to an end.

Stoner suffered a broken right scapula and a fractured left tibia as a result of the accident. Stoner commented on the crash, "I didn't have enough time to engage the clutch [when the throttle stuck]. I picked the bike up to try to slow down but I was heading towards the wall so I decided to lay it over and hit the barrier. Unfortunately the barriers were a lot harder than they looked and we came out of it with broken bones." Honda investigated the bike and discovered that the throttle mechanism had been defective and was stuck open at 26 degrees before the crash. Honda officially apologised to Stoner for the mechanical failure.

=== Proposed MotoGP Fill-in ===
After Repsol Honda Team completed the 2015 Qatar Grand Prix, Dani Pedrosa, Honda's 2015 MotoGP rider had to have surgery to treat the compartment syndrome (arm pump) in his right forearm. This would mean that Pedrosa would miss the next two consecutive races, Austin and the Argentine. Stoner offered to fill in for Pedrosa for these two events. However, HRC Vice President Shuhei Nakamoto and Repsol Honda team manager Livio Suppo decided against using Stoner because they did not have a motorcycle specifically set up for Casey, they also said that Casey was unfamiliar with Circuit of the Americas and Autódromo Termas de Río Hondo and they wanted him to be as competitive as possible. Stoner was disappointed as he tweeted, "Sorry to everyone but I am not racing @circuitamericas next weekend it would have been an honour to ride for @26_DaniPedrosa #NotMeantToBe." And, "Bummer I'm not racing, no prep needed as I wasn't planning on winning, just replacing a good friend and having some fun in Texas!" Instead, Repsol Honda chose HRC test rider Hiroshi Aoyama to replace Dani Pedrosa.

=== Return to Ducati ===
In 2016, Stoner returned to the Ducati Corse Team as a test rider for the 2016 MotoGP season, ending his five-year tenure with Honda. Stoner's main role with Ducati is being a test rider and it has been further proposed that he may appear in some races as a wild card entry. Stoner participated in the official pre-season tests at Malaysia and was the fastest Ducati rider on the grid. He finished the final day of testing with the 5th-best time overall.

Later on in April, Stoner considered racing at the Argentine Grand Prix to fill in for the injured Danilo Petrucci but decided not to. Ducati manager Luigi dall'Igna commented that Stoner's physical fitness was yet not at the level needed to compete and added that, "[Casey] has also had some physical problems, he still lacks strength. It wouldn't make any sense to enter him in a race [at this point]. Mid-way through the season, we'll see." Ultimately he did not compete that season.

== Honours ==
Stoner was named the 2008 Young Australian of the Year for his 2007 MotoGP performance. In the 2013 Queen's Birthday Honours, Stoner was appointed a Member of the Order of Australia (AM) for significant service to motorcycle racing.

The FIM named Stoner a Legend in October 2013 prior to the 2013 Australian motorcycle Grand Prix.

In October 2015, Stoner was inducted into the Sport Australia Hall of Fame.

The third turn at Phillip Island Grand Prix Circuit is named after Stoner.

== Personal life ==
Stoner met Adriana Tuchyna from Adelaide when she approached him at Phillip Island in 2003 and asked him to sign her stomach. A relationship began in 2005 when she turned 16, and they were married in Adelaide on 6 January 2007. At the Czech Republic Grand Prix in August 2011, Stoner announced that his wife was pregnant with their first child. The baby, named Alessandra Maria, was born on 16 February 2012, the same birthday as Stoner's long-time rival Valentino Rossi. On 6 October 2017, their second daughter Caleya Maria's birth was announced by Stoner on social media.

Stoner wore sponsored protective gear from Spidi between 2002 and 2005, and Alpinestars between 2006 and 2012. After announcing his retirement from MotoGP, Stoner still wore sponsored gear from Alpinestars, between his debut of the Australian V8 Supercars in 2013 and associated with the HRC with the tests of development new machinery for Honda RC213V. Following his experience of tiredness and sickness during 2009, Stoner was ultimately diagnosed as lactose intolerant.

In 2019, Stoner revealed he was living with chronic fatigue syndrome (CFS), also known as myalgic encephalomyelitis (ME). In 2020, Stoner became an ambassador for Emerge Australia, an advocacy and support organisation for CFS/ME. In 2022, Stoner revealed that he suffered severe anxiety and mental distress during his MotoGP career. He described laying on the motorhome floor between sessions being massively depressed, "wanting to die", and being afraid he would let his team down if he did not win every race. The anxiety was worse "the better the weekend he had" on the bike. He also revealed that he got aware and better at 'managing' his condition as he got older. He also suspected a link between his mental health crises and the chronic fatigue that developed during his career, although a formal link had yet to be medically evidenced.

== Career statistics ==
Stoner's most successful race was the Australian motorcycle Grand Prix, which he dominated with six straight wins until his retirement, having never lost at the event on a factory bike. His next best races were Qatar with four wins and then Great Britain and Laguna Seca with three wins apiece. In addition, Stoner won every different Grand Prix that was available to be won during his racing career, and he won 21 total different Grand Prix events with wins in Qatar, Turkey, China, Catalunya, Donington Park, Silverstone, Laguna Seca, Czech Republic, San Marino, Phillip Island, Malaysia, Netherlands, Germany, Valencia, Italy, Aragon, Japan, France, Indianapolis, Jerez, and Portugal.

=== Grand Prix motorcycle racing ===
==== By season ====
| Season | Class | Motorcycle | Team | Race | Win | Podium | Pole | FLap | Pts | Plcd | WCh |
|---|---|---|---|---|---|---|---|---|---|---|---|
| 2001 | 125cc | Honda RS125R | Telefónica MoviStar Junior Team | 2 | 0 | 0 | 0 | 0 | 4 | 29th | – |
| 2002 | 250cc | Aprilia RSV 250 | Safilo Oxydo Race LCR | 15 | 0 | 0 | 0 | 0 | 68 | 12th | – |
| 2003 | 125cc | Aprilia RS125R | Safilo Oxydo - LCR | 14 | 1 | 4 | 1 | 2 | 125 | 8th | – |
| 2004 | 125cc | KTM 125 FRR | Red Bull KTM | 14 | 1 | 6 | 1 | 1 | 145 | 5th | – |
| 2005 | 250cc | Aprilia RSV 250 | Carrera Sunglasses - LCR | 16 | 5 | 10 | 2 | 1 | 254 | **2nd** | – |
| 2006 | MotoGP | Honda RC211V | Honda LCR | 16 | 0 | 1 | 1 | 0 | 119 | 8th | – |
| 2007 | MotoGP | Ducati Desmosedici GP7 | Ducati Marlboro Team | 18 | 10 | 14 | 5 | 6 | 367 | **1st** | 1 |
| 2008 | MotoGP | Ducati Desmosedici GP8 | Ducati Marlboro Team | 18 | 6 | 11 | 9 | 9 | 280 | **2nd** | – |
| 2009 | MotoGP | Ducati Desmosedici GP9 | Ducati Marlboro Team | 13 | 4 | 8 | 3 | 2 | 220 | 4th | – |
| 2010 | MotoGP | Ducati Desmosedici GP10 | Ducati Team | 18 | 3 | 9 | 4 | 3 | 225 | 4th | – |
| 2011 | MotoGP | Honda RC212V | Repsol Honda Team | 17 | 10 | 16 | 12 | 7 | 350 | **1st** | 1 |
| 2012 | MotoGP | Honda RC213V | Repsol Honda Team | 15 | 5 | 10 | 5 | 2 | 254 | **3rd** | — |
| Total | | | | **176** | **45** | **89** | **43** | **33** | **2411** | | **2** |

==== By class ====
| Class | Seasons | 1st GP | 1st Pod | 1st Win | Race | Win | Podiums | Pole | FLap | Pts | WChmp |
|---|---|---|---|---|---|---|---|---|---|---|---|
| 125cc | 2001, 2003–2004 | 2001 Great Britain | 2003 Germany | 2003 Valencia | 30 | 2 | 10 | 2 | 3 | 274 | 0 |
| 250cc | 2002, 2005 | 2002 Japan | 2005 Portugal | 2005 Portugal | 31 | 5 | 10 | 2 | 1 | 322 | 0 |
| MotoGP | 2006–2012 | 2006 Spain | 2006 Turkey | 2007 Qatar | 115 | 38 | 69 | 39 | 29 | 1815 | 2 |
| Total | 2001–2012 | | | | **176** | **45** | **89** | **43** | **33** | **2411** | **2** |

==== Races by year ====
(key) (Races in bold indicate pole position, races in italics indicate fastest lap)

| Year | Class | Bike | 1 | 2 | 3 | 4 | 5 | 6 | 7 | 8 | 9 | 10 | 11 | 12 | 13 | 14 | 15 | 16 | 17 | 18 | Pos | Pts |
|---|---|---|---|---|---|---|---|---|---|---|---|---|---|---|---|---|---|---|---|---|---|---|
| 2001 | 125cc | Honda | JPN | RSA | SPA | FRA | ITA | CAT | NED | GBR; 17 | GER | CZE | POR | VAL | PAC | AUS; 12 | MAL | RIO | | | 29th | 4 |
| 2002 | 250cc | Aprilia | JPN; Ret | RSA; Ret | SPA; 6 | FRA; Ret | ITA; DNS | CAT; 6 | NED; 8 | GBR; 11 | GER; Ret | CZE; 5 | POR; Ret | RIO; 6 | PAC; 17 | MAL; 11 | AUS; 10 | VAL; 13 | | | 12th | 68 |
| 2003 | 125cc | Aprilia | JPN; Ret | RSA; 10 | SPA; 6 | FRA; 4 | **ITA**; 18 | CAT; Ret | NED; Ret | GBR; 5 | GER; 2 | CZE; DNS | POR; DNS | RIO; 2 | PAC; 2 | MAL; Ret | AUS; Ret | VAL; 1 | | | 8th | 125 |
| 2004 | 125cc | KTM | RSA; 3 | SPA; 5 | FRA; 8 | ITA; 2 | CAT; 4 | **NED**; 3 | RIO; 2 | GER | GBR | CZE; Ret | POR; Ret | JPN; Ret | QAT; Ret | MAL; 1 | AUS; 3 | VAL; Ret | | | 5th | 145 |
| 2005 | 250cc | Aprilia | SPA; Ret | POR; 1 | **CHN**; 1 | FRA; 4 | ITA; 4 | CAT; 2 | NED; 6 | GBR; 3 | GER; 7 | CZE; 3 | JPN; 3 | MAL; 1 | QAT; 1 | **AUS**; Ret | TUR; 1 | VAL; 3 | | | **2nd** | **254** |
| 2006 | MotoGP | Honda | SPA; 6 | **QAT**; 5 | TUR; 2 | CHN; 5 | FRA; 4 | ITA; Ret | CAT; Ret | NED; 4 | GBR; 4 | GER; DNS | USA; Ret | CZE; 6 | MAL; 8 | AUS; 6 | JPN; Ret | POR; Ret | VAL; Ret | | 8th | 119 |
| 2007 | MotoGP | Ducati | QAT; 1 | SPA; 5 | TUR; 1 | CHN; 1 | FRA; 3 | **ITA**; 4 | CAT; 1 | GBR; 1 | NED; 2 | **GER**; 5 | **USA**; 1 | **CZE**; 1 | **RSM**; 1 | POR; 3 | JPN; 6 | AUS; 1 | MAL; 1 | VAL; 2 | **1st** | **367** |
| 2008 | MotoGP | Ducati | QAT; 1 | SPA; 11 | POR; 6 | CHN; 3 | FRA; 16 | ITA; 2 | **CAT**; 3 | **GBR**; 1 | **NED**; 1 | **GER**; 1 | **USA**; 2 | **CZE**; Ret | **RSM**; Ret | INP; 4 | JPN; 2 | **AUS**; 1 | MAL; 6 | **VAL**; 1 | **2nd** | **280** |
| 2009 | MotoGP | Ducati | **QAT**; 1 | JPN; 4 | SPA; 3 | FRA; 5 | ITA; 1 | CAT; 3 | NED; 3 | USA; 4 | GER; 4 | GBR; 14 | CZE | INP | RSM | POR; 2 | **AUS**; 1 | MAL; 1 | **VAL**; DNS | | 4th | 220 |
| 2010 | MotoGP | Ducati | **QAT**; Ret | SPA; 5 | FRA; Ret | ITA; 4 | GBR; 5 | NED; 3 | CAT; 3 | GER; 3 | USA; 2 | CZE; 3 | INP; Ret | RSM; 5 | **ARA**; 1 | JPN; 1 | MAL; Ret | **AUS**; 1 | POR; Ret | **VAL**; 2 | 4th | 225 |
| 2011 | MotoGP | Honda | **QAT**; 1 | **SPA**; Ret | POR; 3 | **FRA**; 1 | CAT; 1 | **GBR**; 1 | NED; 2 | **ITA**; 3 | **GER**; 3 | USA; 1 | CZE; 1 | **INP**; 1 | **RSM**; 3 | **ARA**; 1 | **JPN**; 3 | **AUS**; 1 | MAL; C | **VAL**; 1 | **1st** | **350** |
| 2012 | MotoGP | Honda | QAT; 3 | SPA; 1 | **POR**; 1 | FRA; 3 | **CAT**; 4 | GBR; 2 | **NED**; 1 | **GER**; Ret | ITA; 8 | USA; 1 | INP; 4 | CZE | RSM | ARA | JPN; 5 | MAL; 3 | **AUS**; 1 | VAL; 3 | **3rd** | **254** |

=== Suzuka 8 Hours results ===
| Year | Team | Co-riders | Bike | Pos |
|---|---|---|---|---|
| 2015 | (Japan) MuSASHi RT HARC-PRO. | (Netherlands) Michael van der Mark (Japan) Takumi Takahashi | Honda CBR1000RR | Ret |

== Bibliography ==
- Stoner, Casey (24 October 2013). Pushing the Limits: The Two-Time World MotoGP Champion's Own Explosive Story. Orion. ISBN 978-1409129219.
- Flack, Darryl (30 August 2023). The Immortals of Australian Motorcycle Racing: The World Champs (Part of the 7-volume comprehensive sports collection). Immortals of Australian Sport (7-book series). Gelding Street Press. ISBN 978-0-6452070-5-7.
