= 2002 Japanese motorcycle Grand Prix =

(Japan) 2002 Japanese Grand Prix
Race details
- Race 1 of 16 races in the 2002 Grand Prix motorcycle racing season
- Date: 7 April 2002
- Official name: SKYY Vodka Grand Prix of Japan
- Location: Suzuka Circuit
- Course: Permanent racing facility; 5.821 km (3.617 mi)

MotoGP
Pole position
- Rider: (Italy) Valentino Rossi
- Time: 2:04.226
Fastest lap
- Rider: (Italy) Valentino Rossi
- Time: 2:19.105 on lap 21
Podium
- First: (Italy) Valentino Rossi
- Second: (Japan) Akira Ryō
- Third: (Spain) Carlos Checa

250cc
Pole position
- Rider: (Spain) Fonsi Nieto
- Time: 2:08.049
Fastest lap
- Rider: (Japan) Osamu Miyazaki
- Time: 2:25.896 on lap 16
Podium
- First: (Japan) Osamu Miyazaki
- Second: (Japan) Daisaku Sakai
- Third: (France) Randy de Puniet

125cc
Pole position
- Rider: (Spain) Daniel Pedrosa
- Time: 2:13.957
Fastest lap
- Rider: (Italy) Stefano Bianco
- Time: 2:30.798 on lap 6
Podium
- First: (France) Arnaud Vincent
- Second: (Italy) Mirko Giansanti
- Third: (San Marino) Manuel Poggiali

The 2002 Japanese motorcycle Grand Prix was the first round of the 2002 MotoGP Championship. It took place on the weekend of 5–7 April 2002 at Suzuka. The race was historic in that it was the first race of the MotoGP class, with engine capacities raised to 990cc from 500cc.

== MotoGP race report ==
This race was most notable for being the first ever race in the new MotoGP class (previously called the 500cc class), the twoway battle for victory in wet conditions, Valentino Rossi's back-to-back victories (winning the last race of the 500cc class, the 2001 Rio de Janeiro Grand Prix and this race) and Akira Ryō's first and only podium in the class at his home race as a wildcard rider.

A new era had begun. The 500cc class is now officially called the MotoGP class and the specifications have been upped from 500cc 2-strokes to 990cc 4-strokes. This is the opening round so no points had been given out for the world championship, but this year's favourites were Valentino Rossi, Max Biaggi, Carlos Checa and Alex Barros.

During the Saturday qualifying, it is Valentino Rossi who has grabbed pole position with a time of 2:04.226. Behind him is Loris Capirossi, veteran Shinichi Ito and Carlos Checa in second, third and fourth place. The second row of the grid consists out of Max Biaggi in fifth, rookie Daijiro Kato in sixth, wildcard rider Akira Ryō in seventh and Olivier Jacque in eighth position. Spanish rider Pere Riba did not qualify for this race.

All riders take off and do their usual warm-up lap before lining up in their respective grid slots. As the lights go out, multiple riders such as Rossi, Capirossi and Biaggi have a terrible start, being swallowed up by the pack. From behind however, riders like Ryō, Ito and Jacque who managed to get into the top three positions thanks to a good start, with the Frenchman now leading into the First Corner (Turn 1) on the opening lap. Exiting the First Corner however, it is Ito who goes up the inside of Jacque to lead the race for the first time, with Ryō doing likewise almost immediately after. Two Japanese riders are now in first and second position, much to the pleasure of the home crowd. In sector one, the top six consists out of Ito, Ryō, Jacque, Checa, Rossi - who overtook Norifumi Abe - and Abe. While Rossi was slowly climbing back up, Biaggi was still stuck in the back behind his teammate Tohru Ukawa in ninth. At Dunlop (Turn 7), Ryō takes a narrower line than Ito and overtakes him for the lead as they exit the turn. Coming up to the Spoon Curve, the Japanese wildcard rider has already opened up a significant gap to second place Ito. At the Casio Triangle, Abe looks to make a move on Rossi, the Italian blocking him off as they enter it.

Lap two has started and Ryō's gap to Ito is still increasing. Biaggi now has lost even more positions and has slipped down to eleventh place. A train of three riders is now starting to form behind Rossi, consisting out of Abe, Sete Gibernau and Repsol Honda teammate Ukawa. Entering the 200R (Turn 12), Gibernau goes alongside Abe and overtakes him before the entrance of the Spoon Curve for sixth. At the Casio Trinagle, Rossi makes his move and goes up the inside of Checa to take fourth place from him. Ito also closes up on Ryō but the Telefónica Movistar Suzuki rider manages to maintain the lead as they exit the chicane.

On lap three, Ukawa takes seventh position from Abe on the start/finish straight. American rookie John Hopkins has crashed out and is shown trying to push start his bike in the grass at the Casio Triangle. Hopkins' teammate Garry McCoy has also crashed out, the marshalls helping him to lift up his bike as he is seen trying to struggle to stand up properly due to an accident in pre-season testing where he broke both of his ankles. Jacque also gets the news that he has made a jump start, forcing him to take a stop-and-go penalty.

On lap four, the top six is as follows: Ryō, Ito, Jacque, Rossi, Checa and Gibernau. Ukawa, after being overtaken by Abe on the previous lap, retakes seventh on the start/finish straight, going into the First Corner. One of the track marshalls signals Jacque that he has a stop-and-go penalty as Rossi dives down the inside of Jacque at the Casio Triangle, promoting him up into third place.

Lap five and the top four - consisting of Ryō, Ito, Rossi and Jacque - all are bunched up. Jacque however still has to take his penalty, making it a three-way battle for the lead soon. Jurgen van den Goorbergh has now retired from the race due to technical issues.

On lap six, Jacque puts his arm up in the air as he takes a different line while crossing the start/finish straight to acknowledge that he has seen the team's pit board. Before the entrance of the Casio Triangle, he slows down and enters the pits, promoting everyone up to one position.

Lap seven and the gap Rossi has to Checa is now visible thanks to Jacque's entrance to the pits. The top three is still relatively close together, with Ryō still in the lead. Jacque takes his penalty, then continues on in last place. Biaggi has also gone down, the Italian walking away angrily after the incident. Rossi is closing up on Ito at the straight before 130R (Turn 14) as Ryō now extends his lead over the fellow Japanese rider. Kenny Roberts Jr. meanwhile has also gone down, sliding out of competition at the Spoon Curve, the American walking away unhurt from his bike.

On lap eight, Rossi is still relatively close behind Ito, still biting his time for a good opportunity. Behind him both Checa and Gibernau are slowly closing the gap to the Italian. The gap Rossi has to Checa is 1.148 seconds. As Ito touches the white line and has a slight moment exiting the 130R, Rossi finally makes his move at the Casio Triangle. He outbreaks Ito at the entrance of the corner, taking second position in the process.

Lap nine and Rossi is now giving chase to leader Ryō. Behind the trio, Checa is now coming under pressure from the other Suzuki of Gibernau. Ryō's gap to Rossi is +1.315 seconds. Halfway around the lap, Checa has closed in significantly to Ito who is now starting to struggle. Hopkins has also come in to talk to his team what to do after his fall earlier in the race.

On lap ten, Rossi has opened a gap to third place Ito and is slowly closing the gap to Ryō. He also sets the fastest lap of the race. At the Hairpin, Gibernau closes up a lot on fourth placed Checa, then overtaking him around the outside of 200R to take the position from him. Behind them, Ukawa and Abe are still fighting for position, Ukawa's Honda passing Abe's Yamaha at the straight before the 130R on superior speed.

Lap eleven and Rossi has closed the gap ever more - the difference now only being +0.435 seconds - for the lead on an ever drying track. From the midfield, Jeremy McWilliams is now closing in rapidly to the duo of Ukawa and Abe. Rossi is now rapidly closing on Ryō, as do Ito, Checa and Gibernau behind him. At the Hairpin, Gibernau lunges up the inside of Ito to take third. At the Casio Triangle, Gibernau brakes later to get close to Rossi but outbreaks himself slightly entering the chicane.

On lap twelve - the halfway point of the race - the field bunches up and it has now become a four-way battle for victory. Gibernau now sets the fastest lap of the race. Checa meanwhile is not able to keep up with the top four and has dropped off the pace. Exiting Degner (Turn 9), Gibernau is right behind Rossi who in turn is right behind Ryō, with Ito further behind as he now also is starting to lose touch. Exiting 130R, Gibernau touched the white line, causing him to have a moment and lost a bit of drive in the process. Sliding sideways, he tries to make a move on Rossi at the entrance of the Casio Triangle but isn't able to and has to slot in behind again.

Lap thirteen and both Ito and Checa are closing up on the trio again, albeit slowly. Gibernau is still trying to find a way past Rossi and Rossi is still right behind Ryō as well. However, entering the second part of Degner, Gibernau loses the front end and slides out of a strong third place, ending his race. Extremely disappointed, he falls on the ground next to his machine, then walks away in pure anger, kicking the gravel multiple times as a result. This promotes Ito back up to third and Checa to fourth. Jacque has also gone down, losing the front end of his bike upon entry of Spoon Curve and sliding out of the race.

On lap fourteen, Ito and Checa are slowly closing the gap to Rossi and Ryō. Exiting the Casio Triangle, Ito now has almost fully closed the gap, making it a three-way fight for the win.

Lap fifteen and the top six is as follows: Ryō, Rossi, Ito, Checa, Ukawa and Abe. Entering Spoon Curve, Ito has a slight moment, allowing Checa to get a bit closer to him. At the Casio Triangle, Abe pulls a switchback move by going to the outside, then to the inside for a late lunge, passing Ukawa for fifth exiting the chicane.

On lap sixteen, two fights now were emerging: The battle for first between Ryō and Rossi and for third between Ito and Checa. Ryō's gap to Rossi is +0.325 seconds. At the Casio Triangle, Rossi finally overtakes Ryō by taking a shorter line upon entry, passing him and taking over the lead.

Lap seventeen and Checa tries to make a move at the Anti-Banked Curve but fails, having to slot in behind Ito. Checa has another look at the short right-hand kink before the Hairpin but thinks better of it. Rossi and Ryō are now slowly pulling away from Ito, who is holding up Checa.

On lap eighteen, Rossi sets the fastest lap as Ryō is still right behind him. McWilliams in the midfield has crashed out of contention, walking away in disappointment as the marshals retrieve his bike to remove it from the circuit. Checa meanwhile has also overtaken Ito by taking a wider line at Snake (Turn 2) and sneaking past, moving him up into third place. Going through 130R, Checa has a little wobble but is able to continue.

Lap nineteen and Ryō now sets the fastest lap of the race. Shinya Nakano has crashed out when he highsided in the middle of Spoon Curve, tumbling through the gravel and out of contention. The marshalls are recovering his bike as the Japanese Gauloises Tech 3 Yamaha riders walks away in disappointment. Ukawa also has gone down, the Japanese rider running to his bike to get it started and get right back into contention, but to no avail. Ryō meanwhile is still harassing Rossi and exiting Spoon Curve, he has a slight moment, allowing the Japanese wildcard rider to get close to him again. He tries a move around the outside at the Casio Triangle but decides to stay behind him for the time being. However, as the duo comes up to lap Kato, Ryō makes good use of it as Rossi is forced to brake as to not directly crash into him, almost overtaking him on the outside but just lacking the speed to finish the move on the start/finish straight.

As the pair comes up to start lap twenty, the penultimate lap, Rossi has managed to stay ahead and is now slowly creating a small gap to Ryō. However, the Japanese rider refuses to give up and still tries to stay close enough to Rossi and once again uses the opportunity to get closer as Rossi has to pass Régis Laconi at the exit of the Casio Triangle.

The final lap - lap twenty-one - has begun and Rossi now is pulling away from Ryō, the Japanese rider not able to challenge him for the duration of the lap. He has a slight wobble exiting 130R but manages to stay on the bike and eventually crosses the line, raising his arm to celebrate his first win of the season - making him a back-to-back winner in both the last race of the 500cc and the first one of the MotoGP era, a feat never achieved before - with Ryō coming home a fair second place +1.550 seconds behind 'The Doctor'. Sticking his leg out, Checa comes home third, Ito in fourth, Abe fifth and Barros sixth. Rossi also sets the fastest lap of the race on the last lap.

In the parade lap, Rossi pulls a big wheelie to celebrate his victory. He also waves the Honda flag, waving in jubilance to the crowd. He then pulls another wheelie as the fans applaud both Ryō and Rossi.

The trio makes their way onto the podium with Checa, Ryō and a happy Rossi all stepping on their respective places. The trophies get handed out to all riders and the Italian national anthem plays for Rossi. After it stops, the audience cheers and claps as the trio gets the champagne handed to them, Rossi cheekily spraying one of the podium girls as the rest sprays each other, Rossi then spraying the audience and joining in on the celebrations.

Rossi's win, Ryō's surprise second and Checa's third place podium means that Rossi starts off his championship defence well, taking home 25 points. Ryō takes 20 and Checa 16 points.

== MotoGP classification ==
Pos.	No.	Rider	Team	Manufacturer	Laps	Time/Retired	Grid	Points
1	46	(Italy) Valentino Rossi	Repsol Honda Team	Honda	21	49:32.766	1	25
2	33	(Japan) Akira Ryō	Telefónica Movistar Suzuki	Suzuki	21	+1.550	7	20
3	7	(Spain) Carlos Checa	Marlboro Yamaha Team	Yamaha	21	+8.353	4	16
4	72	(Japan) Shinichi Ito	Team HRC	Honda	21	+10.829	3	13
5	6	(Japan) Norifumi Abe	Antena 3 Yamaha d'Antín	Yamaha	21	+20.423	12	11
6	4	(Brazil) Alex Barros	West Honda Pons	Honda	21	+32.259	13	10
7	9	(Japan) Nobuatsu Aoki	Proton Team KR	Proton KR	21	+39.633	15	9
8	55	(France) Régis Laconi	MS Aprilia Racing	Aprilia	20	+1 lap	19	8
9	65	(Italy) Loris Capirossi	West Honda Pons	Honda	20	+1 lap	2	7
10	74	(Japan) Daijiro Kato	Fortuna Honda Gresini	Honda	20	+1 lap	6	6
11	31	(Japan) Tetsuya Harada	Pramac Honda Racing Team	Honda	20	+1 lap	16	5
12	21	(United States) John Hopkins	Red Bull Yamaha WCM	Yamaha	16	+5 laps	18	4
Ret (13)	11	(Japan) Tohru Ukawa	Repsol Honda Team	Honda	18	Accident	11	
Ret (14)	56	(Japan) Shinya Nakano	Gauloises Yamaha Tech 3	Yamaha	17	Accident	9	
Ret (15)	99	(United Kingdom) Jeremy McWilliams	Proton Team KR	Proton KR	16	Accident	21	
Ret (16)	15	(Spain) Sete Gibernau	Telefónica Movistar Suzuki	Suzuki	12	Accident	14	
Ret (17)	19	(France) Olivier Jacque	Gauloises Yamaha Tech 3	Yamaha	12	Retirement	8	
Ret (18)	10	(United States) Kenny Roberts Jr.	Telefónica Movistar Suzuki	Suzuki	6	Accident	10	
Ret (19)	3	(Italy) Max Biaggi	Marlboro Yamaha Team	Yamaha	6	Accident	5	
Ret (20)	17	(Netherlands) Jurgen van den Goorbergh	Kanemoto Racing	Honda	4	Retirement	20	
Ret (21)	8	(Australia) Garry McCoy	Red Bull Yamaha WCM	Yamaha	2	Accident	17	
DNQ	20	(Spain) Pere Riba	Antena 3 Yamaha d'Antín	Yamaha		Did not qualify		

== 250 cc classification ==
Pos.	No.	Rider	Manufacturer	Laps	Time/Retired	Grid	Points
1	89	(Japan) Osamu Miyazaki	Yamaha	19	47:09.454	8	25
2	50	(Japan) Daisaku Sakai	Honda	19	+6.941	12	20
3	17	(France) Randy de Puniet	Aprilia	19	+29.020	2	16
4	7	(Spain) Emilio Alzamora	Honda	19	+45.300	6	13
5	9	(Argentina) Sebastián Porto	Yamaha	19	+45.495	7	11
6	8	(Japan) Naoki Matsudo	Yamaha	19	+54.725	10	10
7	49	(Japan) Choujun Kameya	Honda	19	+1:00.572	22	9
8	4	(Italy) Roberto Rolfo	Honda	19	+1:02.287	14	8
9	6	(Spain) Alex Debón	Aprilia	19	+1:18.282	5	7
10	21	(Italy) Franco Battaini	Aprilia	19	+1:19.377	4	6
11	24	(Spain) Toni Elías	Aprilia	19	+1:31.481	11	5
12	92	(Japan) Hiroshi Aoyama	Honda	19	+1:50.269	13	4
13	10	(Spain) Fonsi Nieto	Aprilia	19	+1:56.005	1	3
14	51	(France) Hugo Marchand	Aprilia	19	+2:06.670	26	2
15	22	(Spain) Raúl Jara	Aprilia	18	+1 lap	20	1
16	15	(Italy) Roberto Locatelli	Aprilia	18	+1 lap	9	
Ret (17)	11	(Japan) Haruchika Aoki	Honda	18	Accident	17	
Ret (18)	19	(United Kingdom) Leon Haslam	Honda	16	Retirement	25	
Ret (19)	25	(France) Vincent Philippe	Aprilia	14	Accident	23	
Ret (20)	3	(Italy) Marco Melandri	Aprilia	13	Accident	3	
Ret (21)	41	(Netherlands) Jarno Janssen	Honda	9	Accident	27	
Ret (22)	18	(Malaysia) Shahrol Yuzy	Yamaha	7	Accident	18	
Ret (23)	12	(United Kingdom) Jay Vincent	Honda	4	Accident	24	
Ret (24)	76	(Japan) Taro Sekiguchi	Yamaha	2	Accident	21	
Ret (25)	48	(Japan) Shinichi Nakatomi	Honda	1	Accident	19	
Ret (26)	32	(Spain) Héctor Faubel	Aprilia	1	Accident	28	
Ret (27)	27	(Australia) Casey Stoner	Aprilia	0	Accident	15	
DNS	42	(Spain) David Checa	Aprilia	0	Did not start	16	
DNQ	28	(Germany) Dirk Heidolf	Aprilia		Did not qualify		

== 125 cc classification ==
Pos.	No.	Rider	Manufacturer	Laps	Time/Retired	Grid	Points
1	21	(France) Arnaud Vincent	Aprilia	18	46:22.971	14	25
2	6	(Italy) Mirko Giansanti	Honda	18	+1.164	19	20
3	1	(San Marino) Manuel Poggiali	Gilera	18	+2.558	7	16
4	9	(Japan) Noboru Ueda	Honda	18	+3.479	11	13
5	16	(Italy) Simone Sanna	Aprilia	18	+10.188	17	11
6	66	(Japan) Shuhei Aoyama	Honda	18	+23.056	20	10
7	47	(Spain) Ángel Rodríguez	Aprilia	18	+23.653	13	9
8	26	(Spain) Daniel Pedrosa	Honda	18	+33.488	1	8
9	4	(Italy) Lucio Cecchinello	Aprilia	18	+34.285	3	7
10	23	(Italy) Gino Borsoi	Aprilia	18	+47.304	4	6
11	7	(Italy) Stefano Perugini	Italjet	18	+1:01.770	27	5
12	12	(Germany) Klaus Nöhles	Honda	18	+1:06.064	30	4
13	25	(Spain) Joan Olivé	Honda	18	+1:28.936	18	3
14	19	(Italy) Alex Baldolini	Aprilia	18	+1:36.264	33	2
15	17	(Germany) Steve Jenkner	Aprilia	18	+1:56.859	8	1
16	80	(Spain) Héctor Barberá	Aprilia	18	+2:11.594	28	
17	31	(Italy) Mattia Angeloni	Gilera	18	+2:14.164	37	
18	20	(Hungary) Imre Tóth	Honda	18	+2:17.104	35	
19	46	(Thailand) Suhathai Chaemsap	Honda	18	+2:35.641	21	
Ret (20)	33	(Italy) Stefano Bianco	Aprilia	15	Accident	6	
Ret (21)	65	(Japan) Toshihisa Kuzuhara	Honda	14	Accident	36	
Ret (22)	18	(Czech Republic) Jakub Smrž	Honda	13	Accident	22	
Ret (23)	41	(Japan) Youichi Ui	Derbi	12	Accident	12	
Ret (24)	57	(United Kingdom) Chaz Davies	Aprilia	12	Accident	32	
Ret (25)	39	(Czech Republic) Jaroslav Huleš	Aprilia	7	Accident	9	
Ret (26)	50	(Italy) Andrea Ballerini	Honda	7	Accident	26	
Ret (27)	36	(Finland) Mika Kallio	Honda	7	Accident	16	
Ret (28)	5	(Japan) Masao Azuma	Honda	6	Accident	5	
Ret (29)	34	(Italy) Andrea Dovizioso	Honda	6	Accident	25	
Ret (30)	8	(Hungary) Gábor Talmácsi	Italjet	5	Retirement	31	
Ret (31)	84	(Italy) Michel Fabrizio	Gilera	5	Retirement	34	
Ret (32)	10	(Germany) Jarno Müller	Honda	5	Accident	24	
Ret (33)	67	(Japan) Hideyuki Ogata	Honda	4	Accident	23	
Ret (34)	22	(Spain) Pablo Nieto	Aprilia	3	Accident	2	
Ret (35)	15	(San Marino) Alex de Angelis	Aprilia	1	Accident	15	
Ret (36)	11	(Italy) Max Sabbatani	Aprilia	0	Accident	10	
Ret (37)	68	(Japan) Akira Komuro	Honda	0	Accident	29	

== Championship standings after the race (MotoGP) ==
Below are the standings for the top five riders and constructors after round one has concluded.

Riders' Championship standings

Pos.	Rider	Points
1	(Italy) Valentino Rossi	25
2	(Japan) Akira Ryō	20
3	(Spain) Carlos Checa	16
4	(Japan) Shinichi Ito	13
5	(Japan) Norifumi Abe	11

Constructors' Championship standings

Pos.	Constructor	Points
1	(Japan) Honda	25
2	(Japan) Suzuki	20
3	(Japan) Yamaha	16
4	(Malaysia) / (United States) Proton KR	9
5	(Italy) Aprilia	8

- Note: Only the top five positions are included for both sets of standings.

Previous race: 2001 Rio de Janeiro Grand Prix	FIM Grand Prix World Championship; 2002 season	Next race: 2002 South African Grand Prix
Previous race: 2001 Japanese Grand Prix	Japanese motorcycle Grand Prix	Next race: 2003 Japanese Grand Prix
