= Alex de Angelis =

Sammarinese motorcycle racer

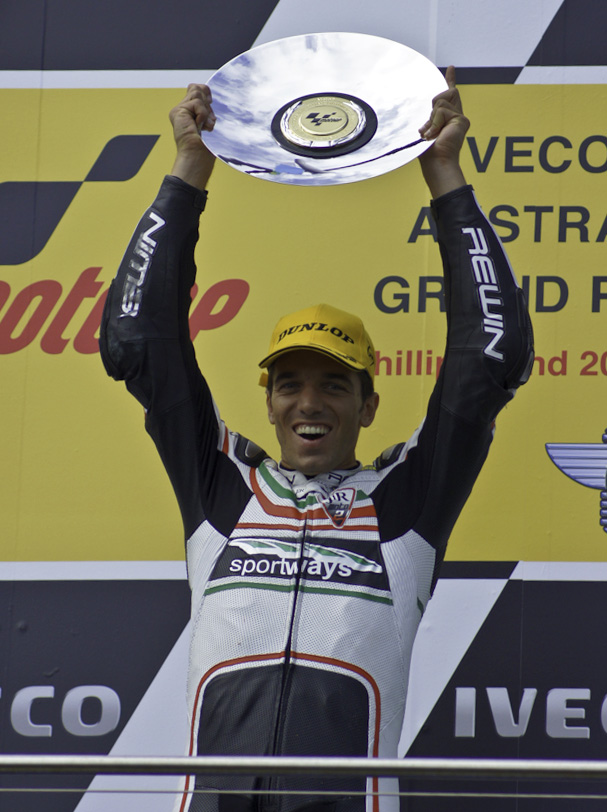
- De Angelis at the 2010 Australian Grand Prix
- Nationality: Sammarinese
- Born: 26 February 1984 (age 42); Rimini, Italy
- Current team: Ducati MotoE Test Team
- Bike number: 15
- Website: alexdeangelis.com
Motorcycle racing career statistics
MotoGP World Championship
Active years	2008–2010, 2013–2015
Manufacturers	Honda, Ducati, Forward Yamaha, ART
Championships	0
2015 championship position	28th (2 pts)
Starts / Wins / Podiums / Poles / F. laps / Points; 61 / 0 / 1 / 0 / 0 / 206
Moto2 World Championship
Active years	2010–2014, 2017
Manufacturers	Force GP210, Motobi, Suter, FTR, Speed Up, Kalex
Championships	0
2017 championship position	32nd (5 pts)
Starts / Wins / Podiums / Poles / F. laps / Points; 74 / 3 / 7 / 2 / 5 / 478
250cc World Championship
Active years	2004–2007
Manufacturers	Aprilia
Championships	0
2007 championship position	3rd (235 pts)
Starts / Wins / Podiums / Poles / F. laps / Points; 65 / 1 / 25 / 4 / 13 / 761
125cc World Championship
Active years	1999–2003
Manufacturers	Honda, Aprilia
Championships	0
2003 championship position	2nd (166 pts)
Starts / Wins / Podiums / Poles / F. laps / Points; 65 / 0 / 7 / 5 / 0 / 357
MotoE World Championship
Active years	2019–2020
Manufacturers	Energica
Championships	0
2020 championship position	14th (35 pts)
Starts / Wins / Podiums / Poles / F. laps / Points; 13 / 0 / 0 / 1 / 1 / 82
Superbike World Championship
Active years	2016–2017
Manufacturers	Aprilia, Kawasaki
Championships	0
2017 championship position	19th (32 pts)
Starts / Wins / Podiums / Poles / F. laps / Points; 41 / 0 / 1 / 0 / 0 / 128

Alex de Angelis (born 26 February 1984) is a Sammarinese retired motorcycle road racer.

== Career ==
=== 125cc World Championship ===
Born in Rimini, de Angelis made his debut at world championship level in 1999 in the 125 cc class; his first full season was in 2000, when his best results were two sixth places. He rode a total of four full seasons in the 125cc category. His best season in the 125 class came in 2003 when he claimed six podium finishes and finished second to Dani Pedrosa, despite not recording any wins.

=== 250cc World Championship ===
De Angelis moved to the 250cc category in 2004, when he scored two podiums and was fifth overall. Next year he had four podiums and was seventh overall. 2006 turned out to be real breakthrough, as he finished third in the championship. He took his first victory at the season finale in Valencia, after nine second and 14 third places and eight pole-positions beforehand. In 2007, he finished third overall with 235 points and eight podiums, including four successive second places midseason. He finished on the podium at the Sachsenring every year between 2002 and 2007.

=== MotoGP World Championship ===
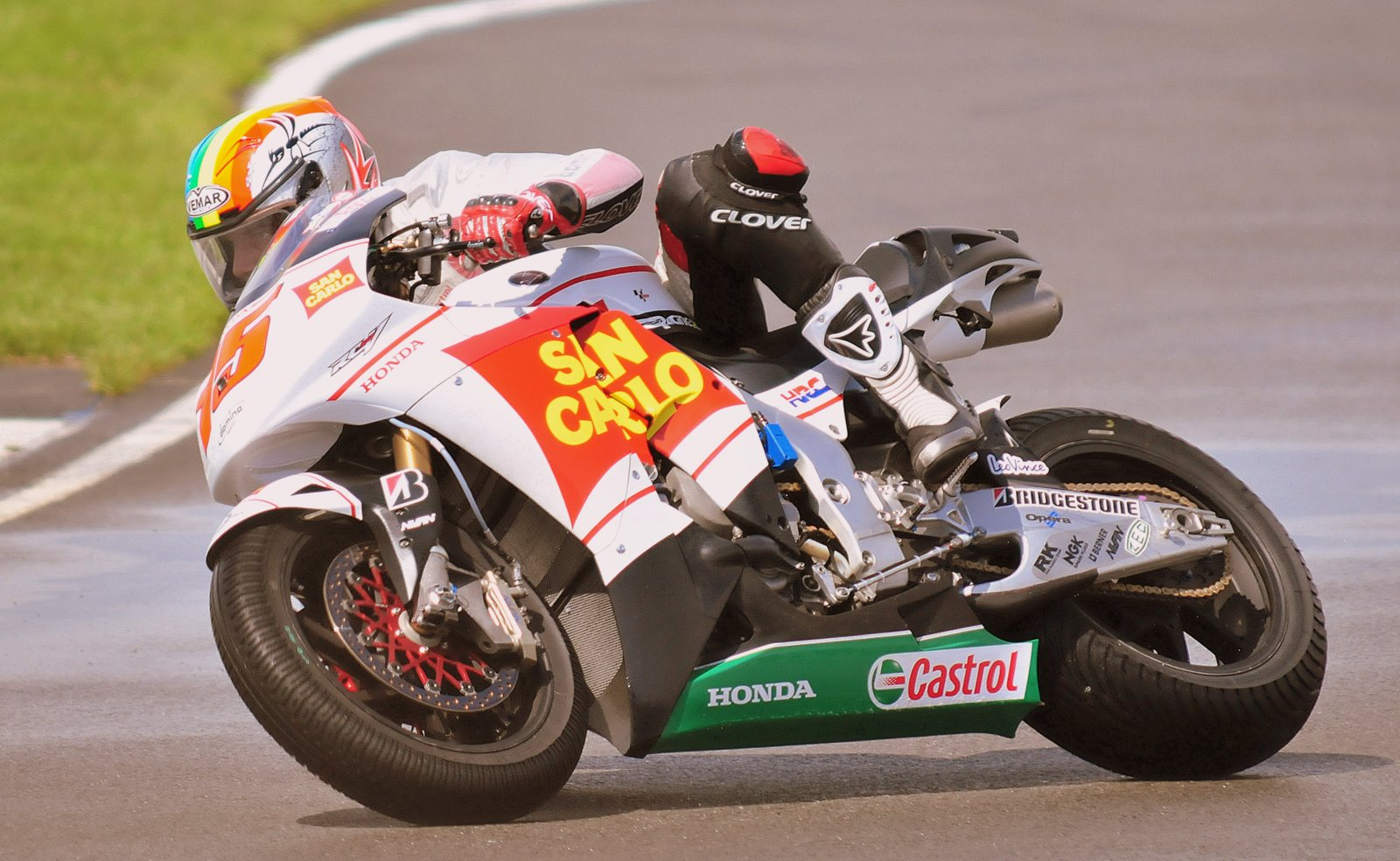
De Angelis in 2009

For 2008, de Angelis moved to the MotoGP class, riding for Gresini Honda. At Mugello, he was fastest in the warmup, and impressed on race day to finish fourth. He also came fourth at the Sachsenring, and consistently scored minor points for the rest of the season. He stayed at Gresini for 2009 after an impressive rookie year. However, he left the team for 2010 as he and his teammate Toni Elías were replaced with Marco Melandri and Marco Simoncelli. Instead, he signed a deal to partner Niccolò Canepa at Team Scot in the first season of the new Moto2 class.

=== Return to Moto2 ===
After replacing the injured Hiroshi Aoyama for three races in MotoGP, de Angelis returned to Moto2 at the San Marino Grand Prix in Misano. During this race, he was involved in an accident which resulted in the death of Japanese rider Shoya Tomizawa. After Tomizawa fell from his bike on the twelfth lap of the race, he was immediately hit by de Angelis and Scott Redding, who were unable to avoid him. De Angelis avoided major injury and was able to walk away from the accident.

=== Return to MotoGP ===
De Angelis moved back to the premier class to replace Colin Edwards in the Forward team midway through the 2014 season from the Brno round onwards when Edwards retired from MotoGP racing. For the 2015 season, de Angelis replaced Danilo Petrucci at the Octo IodaRacing Team.

== Career statistics ==
=== Grand Prix motorcycle racing ===
==== By season ====
Season	Class	Motorcycle	Team	Race	Win	Podium	Pole	FLap	Pts	Plcd
1999	125cc	Honda	Matteoni Racing	1	0	0	0	0	0	NC
2000	125cc	Honda	Chupa Chups Matteoni Racing	16	0	0	0	0	41	18th
2001	125cc	Honda	Matteoni Racing	16	0	0	0	0	63	14th
2002	125cc	Aprilia	Safilo Oxydo Race LCR	16	0	1	1	0	87	9th
2003	125cc	Aprilia	Globet.com Racing	16	0	6	4	0	166	**2nd**
2004	250cc	Aprilia	Aprilia Racing	16	0	2	1	1	147	5th
2005	250cc	Aprilia	MS Aprilia Italia Corse	16	0	4	2	2	151	7th
2006	250cc	Aprilia	Master - MVA Aspar Team	16	1	11	0	5	228	**3rd**
2007	250cc	Aprilia	Master MVA Aspar Team	17	0	8	1	5	235	**3rd**
2008	MotoGP	Honda	San Carlo Honda Gresini	18	0	0	0	0	63	14th
2009	MotoGP	Honda	San Carlo Honda Gresini	17	0	1	0	0	111	8th
2010	Moto2	Force GP210	RSM Team Scot	5	0	0	0	0	95	11th
2010	Moto2	Motobi	JiR Moto2	7	1	3	1	1	95	11th
2010	MotoGP	Honda	Interwetten Honda MotoGP Team	3	0	0	0	0	11	18th
2011	Moto2	Motobi	JiR Moto2	17	1	2	1	2	174	4th
2012	Moto2	Suter	NGM Mobile Forward Racing	6	0	0	0	0	86	12th
2012	Moto2	FTR	NGM Mobile Forward Racing	9	1	2	0	1	86	12th
2013	Moto2	Speed Up	NGM Mobile Forward Racing	17	0	0	0	1	81	14th
2013	MotoGP	Ducati	Ignite Pramac Racing	1	0	0	0	0	5	23rd
2014	Moto2	Suter	Tasca Racing Moto2	10	0	0	0	0	37	20th
2014	MotoGP	Forward Yamaha	NGM Forward Racing	8	0	0	0	0	14	21st
2015	MotoGP	ART	IodaRacing Team	14	0	0	0	0	2	28th
2017	Moto2	Kalex	Tasca Racing Scuderia Moto2	2	0	0	0	0	5	32nd
2017	Moto2	Suter	Dynavolt Intact GP	1	0	0	0	0	5	32nd
2019	MotoE	Energica	Octo Pramac MotoE	6	0	0	1	0	47	7th
2020	MotoE	Energica	Octo Pramac MotoE	7	0	0	0	1	35	14th
Total				**278**	**4**	**40**	**12**	**19**	**1884**	

==== By class ====
Class	Seasons	1st GP	1st Pod	1st Win	Race	Win	Podiums	Pole	FLap	Pts	WChmp
125cc	1999–2003	1999 Imola	2002 Germany		65	0	7	5	0	357	0
250cc	2004–2007	2004 South Africa	2004 Germany	2006 Valencia	65	1	25	4	13	761	0
MotoGP	2008–2010, 2013–2015	2008 Qatar	2009 Indianapolis		61	0	1	0	0	206	0
Moto2	2010–2014, 2017	2010 Qatar	2010 Malaysia	2010 Australia	74	3	7	2	5	478	0
MotoE	2019–2020	2019 Germany			13	0	0	1	1	82	0
Total	1999–2015, 2017, 2019–2020				**278**	**4**	**40**	**12**	**19**	**1884**	**0**

==== Races by year ====
(key) (Races in bold indicate pole position, races in italics indicate fastest lap)

Year	Class	Bike	1	2	3	4	5	6	7	8	9	10	11	12	13	14	15	16	17	18	Pos	Pts
1999	125cc	Honda	MAL	JPN	SPA	FRA	ITA	CAT	NED	GBR	GER	CZE	IMO; Ret	VAL	AUS	RSA	RIO	ARG			NC	0
2000	125cc	Honda	RSA; 16	MAL; 16	JPN; Ret	SPA; 15	FRA; 15	ITA; 12	CAT; Ret	NED; 14	GBR; 12	GER; Ret	CZE; Ret	POR; Ret	VAL; 12	RIO; 11	PAC; 6	AUS; 6			18th	41
2001	125cc	Honda	JPN; 14	RSA; 9	SPA; 7	FRA; 14	ITA; 10	CAT; 9	NED; Ret	GBR; Ret	GER; 12	CZE; 12	POR; Ret	VAL; Ret	PAC; Ret	AUS; 6	MAL; 14	RIO; 6			14th	63
2002	125cc	Aprilia	JPN; Ret	RSA; 6	SPA; Ret	FRA; Ret	ITA; 7	CAT; Ret	NED; 9	GBR; 7	GER; 2	**CZE**; 8	POR; Ret	RIO; 11	PAC; Ret	MAL; 10	AUS; Ret	VAL; 4			9th	87
2003	125cc	Aprilia	**JPN**; Ret	RSA; 6	SPA; 3	FRA; Ret	ITA; 7	CAT; 3	NED; 6	GBR; 4	GER; 3	**CZE**; 3	**POR**; 3	RIO; 3	PAC; 9	MAL; 6	AUS; 7	**VAL**; Ret			**2nd**	**166**
2004	250cc	Aprilia	RSA; 5	SPA; 6	FRA; 5	ITA; 8	CAT; Ret	NED; 5	RIO; 4	GER; 3	**GBR**; 4	CZE; Ret	POR; 5	JPN; 6	QAT; Ret	MAL; 4	AUS; 2	VAL; Ret			5th	147
2005	250cc	Aprilia	SPA; 3	POR; 5	CHN; 4	FRA; Ret	ITA; 3	CAT; Ret	NED; 5	GBR; Ret	**GER**; 3	CZE; 4	JPN; 7	MAL; 3	QAT; Ret	AUS; Ret	**TUR**; 7	VAL; 4			7th	151
2006	250cc	Aprilia	SPA; 2	QAT; Ret	TUR; 12	CHN; Ret	FRA; 5	ITA; 2	CAT; 3	NED; 2	GBR; 2	GER; 2	CZE; Ret	MAL; 3	AUS; 2	JPN; 2	POR; 3	VAL; 1			**3rd**	**228**
2007	250cc	Aprilia	QAT; 2	SPA; 4	TUR; 4	CHN; 4	FRA; 3	ITA; 2	CAT; 2	**GBR**; 2	NED; 2	GER; 3	CZE; 11	RSM; 5	POR; 6	JPN; 5	AUS; 9	MAL; Ret	VAL; 2		**3rd**	**235**
2008	MotoGP	Honda	QAT; Ret	SPA; 14	POR; 11	CHN; 16	FRA; 12	ITA; 4	CAT; Ret	GBR; 15	NED; Ret	GER; 4	USA; 13	CZE; 8	RSM; Ret	INP; 10	JPN; 17	AUS; Ret	MAL; 14	VAL; 10	14th	63
2009	MotoGP	Honda	QAT; 6	JPN; 13	SPA; 14	FRA; 11	ITA; 15	CAT; 12	NED; 10	USA; 11	GER; 5	GBR; 4	CZE; 8	INP; 2	RSM; Ret	POR; Ret	AUS; 4	MAL; 12	VAL; 10		8th	111
2010	Moto2	Force GP210	QAT; Ret	SPA; DNS	FRA; Ret	ITA; 11	GBR; DNS	NED; 20	CAT; 10												11th	95
2010	Moto2	Motobi											INP	RSM; Ret	ARA; Ret	JPN; 4	MAL; 2	**AUS**; 1	POR; 3	VAL; 6	11th	95
2010	MotoGP	Honda								GER; 12	USA; 12	CZE; 13									18th	11
2011	Moto2	Motobi	QAT; 4	SPA; 7	POR; 12	FRA; 10	CAT; 6	GBR; Ret	NED; 5	ITA; 4	GER; 3	CZE; 4	INP; 15	RSM; 4	ARA; 4	JPN; 6	**AUS**; 1	MAL; 4	VAL; 12		4th	174
2012	Moto2	Suter	QAT; Ret	SPA; 12	POR; 6	FRA; Ret	CAT; 14	GBR; 11													12th	86
2012	Moto2	FTR							NED; 5	GER; 3	ITA; Ret	INP; Ret	CZE; 6	RSM; 13	ARA; Ret	JPN; 19	MAL; 1	AUS; DNS	VAL		12th	86
2013	Moto2	Speed Up	QAT; 8	AME; 8	SPA; 14	FRA; 9	ITA; 8	CAT; Ret	NED; 15	GER; 5		INP; 14	CZE; Ret	GBR; 14	RSM; 14	ARA; Ret	MAL; Ret	AUS; 5	JPN; 7	VAL; 6	14th	81
2013	MotoGP	Ducati									USA; 11										23rd	5
2014	Moto2	Suter	QAT; Ret	AME; 8	ARG; 6	SPA; 17	FRA; Ret	ITA; 17	CAT; Ret	NED; 5	GER; Ret	INP; 8									20th	37
2014	MotoGP	Forward Yamaha											CZE; 16	GBR; 15	RSM; 14	ARA; 12	JPN; 17	AUS; 9	MAL; Ret	VAL; 18	21st	14
2015	MotoGP	ART	QAT; 20	AME; 18	ARG; 22	SPA; 21	FRA; 17	ITA; Ret	CAT; 15	NED; Ret	GER; 18	INP; 21	CZE; Ret	GBR; 15	RSM; Ret	ARA; Ret	JPN; DNS	AUS	MAL	VAL	28th	2
2017	Moto2	Kalex	QAT	ARG	AME	SPA	FRA	ITA	CAT	NED	GER	CZE	AUT	GBR; 24					MAL; 18	VAL	32nd	5
2017	Moto2	Suter													RSM; 11	ARA	JPN	AUS			32nd	5
2019	MotoE	Energica	GER; 6	AUT; 4	**RSM1**; Ret	**RSM2**; Ret	VAL1; 5	VAL2; 4													7th	47
2020	MotoE	Energica	SPA; 17	ANC; 4	RSM; 8	EMI1; Ret	EMI2; 9	FRA1; 12	FRA2; 14												14th	35

=== Superbike World Championship ===
==== Races by year ====
(key) (Races in bold indicate pole position, races in italics indicate fastest lap)

Year	Bike	1		2		3		4		5		6		7		8		9		10		11		12		13		Pos	Pts
Year	Bike	R1	R2	R1	R2	R1	R2	R1	R2	R1	R2	R1	R2	R1	R2	R1	R2	R1	R2	R1	R2	R1	R2	R1	R2	R1	R2	Pos	Pts
2016	Aprilia	AUS; Ret	AUS; 13	THA; 9	THA; 14	SPA; 11	SPA; 8	NED; 12	NED; DNS	ITA; 15	ITA; 14	MAL; Ret	MAL; 7	GBR; Ret	GBR; 15	ITA; 12	ITA; 13	USA; 9	USA; Ret	GER; 12	GER; 2	FRA; 10	FRA; 14	SPA; 11	SPA; Ret	QAT; 13	QAT; Ret	13th	96
2017	Kawasaki	AUS; 14	AUS; 11	THA; 16	THA; 11	SPA; 15	SPA; Ret	NED; 12	NED; 15	ITA; 11	ITA; Ret	GBR; 17	GBR; Ret	ITA; 12	ITA; Ret	USA; 14	USA; 13	GER	GER	POR	POR	FRA	FRA	SPA	SPA	QAT	QAT	19th	32
