= List of career achievements by Valentino Rossi =

This is a list of career statistics of Valentino Rossi.

== Junior career ==
=== Karting ===
==== Summary ====
Season	Class	Number	Win	Plcd	Chmp
1985–1988	Not announced				
1989	60cc	46	NA	NC	0
1990	60cc	46	9	**1st**	1
1991	60cc	46	NA	5th	0
Total					**1**

=== Minibike ===
==== Summary ====
Season	Number	Plcd	Chmp
1992	46	**1st**	1
Total			**1**

=== Italian Sport Production Championship ===
==== By season ====
Season	Class	Motorcycle	Team	Number	Race	Win	Podium	Pts	Plcd	Chmp
1993	125cc	Cagiva Mito 125	Lucky Explorer Cagiva	N/A	N/A	N/A	N/A	N/A	9th	–
1994	125cc	Cagiva Mito 125	Lucky Explorer Cagiva	N/A	N/A	N/A	N/A	N/A	**1st**	1
1995	125cc	Aprilia RS125	Diottalevi Rivacold Aprilia	N/A	N/A	N/A	N/A	N/A	**1st**	1
Total					**N/A**	**N/A**	**N/A**	**N/A**	**N/A**	**2**

==== Races by year ====
(key) (Races in bold indicate pole position, races in italics indicate fastest lap)

Year	Class	Bike	1	2	3	4	5	6	Pos	Pts
1993	125cc	Cagiva	MUG; 9	MON; Ret	MIS; 1				9th	NA
1994	125cc	Cagiva	VLA; Ret	MUG1; 5	MUG2; 2	MON1; Ret	MON2; 1	MIS; 2	1st	NA

=== International Junior Championship ===
==== By season ====
Season	Series	Class	Motorcycle	Team	No	Plcd	Chmp
1995	European Championship	125cc	Aprilia RS125	Rivacold Aprilia Team	4	**3rd**	–
1995	Spanish Open	125cc	Aprilia RS125	Aprilia Team	46	11th	–

=== FIM CIV (Campionato Italiano Velocità) results ===
Year	Class	Bike	No	1	2	3	4	5	Pos	Pts
1995	125cc	Aprilia	15	MIS; 1	MON; 1	VLA; 1	MIS; 25	MUG; Ret	1st	75

== Senior career ==
=== Grand Prix motorcycle racing ===
==== By season ====
Season	Class	Motorcycle	Team	Race	Win	Podium	Pole	FLap	Pts	Plcd	WCh
1996	125cc	Aprilia RS125	Scuderia AGV Aprilia	15	1	2	1	2	111	9th	–
1997	125cc	Aprilia RS125	Nastro Azzurro Aprilia	15	11	13	4	7	321	**1st**	1
1998	250cc	Aprilia RS250	Nastro Azzurro Aprilia	14	5	9	0	3	201	**2nd**	–
1999	250cc	Aprilia RS250	Nastro Azzurro Aprilia	16	9	12	5	8	309	**1st**	1
2000	500cc	Honda NSR500	Nastro Azzurro Honda	16	2	10	0	5	209	**2nd**	–
2001	500cc	Honda NSR500	Nastro Azzurro Honda	16	11	13	4	10	325	**1st**	1
2002	MotoGP	Honda RC211V	Repsol Honda Team	16	11	15	7	9	355	**1st**	1
2003	MotoGP	Honda RC211V	Repsol Honda Team	16	9	16	9	12	357	**1st**	1
2004	MotoGP	Yamaha YZR-M1	Gauloises Fortuna Yamaha	16	9	11	5	3	304	**1st**	1
2005	MotoGP	Yamaha YZR-M1	Gauloises Yamaha Team (Note: Due to tobacco advertising, the team was known as Yamaha Factory Racing at the United States and Valencian Grands Prix.)	17	11	16	5	6	367	**1st**	1
2006	MotoGP	Yamaha YZR-M1	Camel Yamaha Team	17	5	10	5	4	247	**2nd**	–
2007	MotoGP	Yamaha YZR-M1	Fiat Yamaha Team	18	4	8	4	3	241	**3rd**	–
2008	MotoGP	Yamaha YZR-M1	Fiat Yamaha Team	18	9	16	2	5	373	**1st**	1
2009	MotoGP	Yamaha YZR-M1	Fiat Yamaha Team	17	6	13	7	6	306	**1st**	1
2010	MotoGP	Yamaha YZR-M1	Fiat Yamaha Team	14	2	10	1	2	233	**3rd**	–
2011	MotoGP	Ducati Desmosedici GP11	Ducati Team	17	0	1	0	1	139	7th	–
2012	MotoGP	Ducati Desmosedici GP12	Ducati Team	18	0	2	0	1	163	6th	–
2013	MotoGP	Yamaha YZR-M1	Yamaha Factory Racing	18	1	6	0	1	237	4th	–
2014	MotoGP	Yamaha YZR-M1	Movistar Yamaha MotoGP	18	2	13	1	1	295	**2nd**	–
2015	MotoGP	Yamaha YZR-M1	Movistar Yamaha MotoGP	18	4	15	1	4	325	**2nd**	–
2016	MotoGP	Yamaha YZR-M1	Movistar Yamaha MotoGP	18	2	10	3	2	249	**2nd**	–
2017	MotoGP	Yamaha YZR-M1	Movistar Yamaha MotoGP	17	1	6	0	0	208	5th	–
2018	MotoGP	Yamaha YZR-M1	Movistar Yamaha MotoGP	18	0	5	1	0	198	**3rd**	–
2019	MotoGP	Yamaha YZR-M1	Monster Energy Yamaha MotoGP	19	0	2	0	1	174	7th	–
2020	MotoGP	Yamaha YZR-M1	Monster Energy Yamaha MotoGP	12	0	1	0	0	66	15th	–
2021	MotoGP	Yamaha YZR-M1	Petronas Yamaha SRT	18	0	0	0	0	44	18th	–
Total				**432**	**115**	**235**	**65**	**96**	**6357**		**9**

==== By class ====
Class	Seasons	1st GP	1st Pod	1st Win	Race	Win	Podiums	Pole	FLap	Pts	WChmp
125cc	1996–1997	1996 Malaysia	1996 Austria	1996 Czech Republic	30	12	15	5	9	432	1
250cc	1998–1999	1998 Japan	1998 Spain	1998 Netherlands	30	14	21	5	11	510	1
500cc	2000–2001	2000 South Africa	2000 Spain	2000 Great Britain	32	13	23	4	15	534	1
MotoGP	2002–2021	2002 Japan	2002 Japan	2002 Japan	340	76	176	51	61	4881	6
Total	1996–2021				**432**	**115**	**235**	**65**	**96**	**6357**	**9**

==== Races by year ====
(key) (Races in bold indicate pole position, races in italics indicate fastest lap)

Year	Class	Bike	1	2	3	4	5	6	7	8	9	10	11	12	13	14	15	16	17	18	19	Pos	Pts
1996	125cc	Aprilia	MAL; 6	INA; 11	JPN; 11	SPA; 4	ITA; 4	FRA; Ret	NED; Ret	GER; 5	GBR; Ret	AUT; 3	**CZE**; 1	IMO; 5	CAT; Ret	RIO; Ret	AUS; 14					9th	111
1997	125cc	Aprilia	**MAL**; 1	JPN; Ret	SPA; 1	ITA; 1	AUT; 2	FRA; 1	**NED**; 1	**IMO**; 1	**GER**; 1	RIO; 1	GBR; 1	CZE; 3	CAT; 1	INA; 1	AUS; 6					**1st**	**321**
1998	250cc	Aprilia	JPN; Ret	MAL; Ret	SPA; 2	ITA; 2	FRA; 2	MAD; Ret	NED; 1	GBR; Ret	GER; 3	CZE; Ret	IMO; 1	CAT; 1	AUS; 1	ARG; 1						**2nd**	**201**
1999	250cc	Aprilia	**MAL**; 5	JPN; 7	SPA; 1	**FRA**; Ret	ITA; 1	CAT; 1	**NED**; 2	GBR; 1	**GER**; 1	CZE; 1	IMO; 2	VAL; 8	AUS; 1	RSA; 1	RIO; 1	**ARG**; 3				**1st**	**309**
2000	500cc	Honda	RSA; Ret	MAL; Ret	JPN; 11	SPA; 3	FRA; 3	ITA; 12	CAT; 3	NED; 6	GBR; 1	GER; 2	CZE; 2	POR; 3	VAL; Ret	RIO; 1	PAC; 2	AUS; 3				**2nd**	**209**
2001	500cc	Honda	JPN; 1	**RSA**; 1	**SPA**; 1	FRA; 3	**ITA**; Ret	**CAT**; 1	NED; 2	GBR; 1	GER; 7	CZE; 1	POR; 1	VAL; 11	PAC; 1	AUS; 1	MAL; 1	RIO; 1				**1st**	**325**
2002	MotoGP	Honda	**JPN**; 1	**RSA**; 2	**SPA**; 1	**FRA**; 1	**ITA**; 1	CAT; 1	**NED**; 1	**GBR**; 1	GER; 1	CZE; Ret	POR; 1	RIO; 1	PAC; 2	MAL; 2	AUS; 1	VAL; 2				**1st**	**355**
2003	MotoGP	Honda	**JPN**; 1	RSA; 2	SPA; 1	**FRA**; 2	**ITA**; 1	**CAT**; 2	NED; 3	GBR; 3	GER; 2	**CZE**; 1	POR; 1	**RIO**; 1	PAC; 2	**MAL**; 1	**AUS**; 1	**VAL**; 1				**1st**	**357**
2004	MotoGP	Yamaha	**RSA**; 1	**SPA**; 4	FRA; 4	ITA; 1	CAT; 1	**NED**; 1	RIO; Ret	GER; 4	**GBR**; 1	CZE; 2	POR; 1	JPN; 2	QAT; Ret	**MAL**; 1	AUS; 1	VAL; 1				**1st**	**304**
2005	MotoGP	Yamaha	**SPA**; 1	POR; 2	CHN; 1	**FRA**; 1	**ITA**; 1	CAT; 1	**NED**; 1	USA; 3	**GBR**; 1	GER; 1	CZE; 1	JPN; Ret	MAL; 2	QAT; 1	AUS; 1	TUR; 2	VAL; 3			**1st**	**367**
2006	MotoGP	Yamaha	SPA; 14	QAT; 1	TUR; 4	CHN; Ret	FRA; Ret	ITA; 1	**CAT**; 1	NED; 8	GBR; 2	GER; 1	USA; Ret	**CZE**; 2	**MAL**; 1	AUS; 3	JPN; 2	**POR**; 2	**VAL**; 13			**2nd**	**247**
2007	MotoGP	Yamaha	**QAT**; 2	SPA; 1	**TUR**; 10	**CHN**; 2	FRA; 6	ITA; 1	**CAT**; 2	GBR; 4	NED; 1	GER; Ret	USA; 4	CZE; 7	RSM; Ret	POR; 1	JPN; 13	AUS; 3	MAL; 5	VAL; Ret		**3rd**	**241**
2008	MotoGP	Yamaha	QAT; 5	SPA; 2	POR; 3	CHN; 1	FRA; 1	**ITA**; 1	CAT; 2	GBR; 2	NED; 11	GER; 2	USA; 1	CZE; 1	RSM; 1	**INP**; 1	JPN; 1	AUS; 2	MAL; 1	VAL; 3		**1st**	**373**
2009	MotoGP	Yamaha	QAT; 2	**JPN**; 2	SPA; 1	FRA; 16	ITA; 3	CAT; 1	**NED**; 1	USA; 2	**GER**; 1	**GBR**; 5	**CZE**; 1	INP; Ret	**RSM**; 1	POR; 4	AUS; 2	**MAL**; 3	VAL; 2			**1st**	**306**
2010	MotoGP	Yamaha	QAT; 1	SPA; 3	**FRA**; 2	ITA; DNS	GBR	NED	CAT	GER; 4	USA; 3	CZE; 5	INP; 4	RSM; 3	ARA; 6	JPN; 3	MAL; 1	AUS; 3	POR; 2	VAL; 3		**3rd**	**233**
2011	MotoGP	Ducati	QAT; 7	SPA; 5	POR; 5	FRA; 3	CAT; 5	GBR; 6	NED; 4	ITA; 6	GER; 9	USA; 6	CZE; 6	INP; 10	RSM; 7	ARA; 10	JPN; Ret	AUS; Ret	MAL; C	VAL; Ret		7th	139
2012	MotoGP	Ducati	QAT; 10	SPA; 9	POR; 7	FRA; 2	CAT; 7	GBR; 9	NED; 13	GER; 6	ITA; 5	USA; Ret	INP; 7	CZE; 7	RSM; 2	ARA; 8	JPN; 7	MAL; 5	AUS; 7	VAL; 10		6th	163
2013	MotoGP	Yamaha	QAT; 2	AME; 6	SPA; 4	FRA; 12	ITA; Ret	CAT; 4	NED; 1	GER; 3	USA; 3	INP; 4	CZE; 4	GBR; 4	RSM; 4	ARA; 3	MAL; 4	AUS; 3	JPN; 6	VAL; 4		4th	237
2014	MotoGP	Yamaha	QAT; 2	AME; 8	ARG; 4	SPA; 2	FRA; 2	ITA; 3	CAT; 2	NED; 5	GER; 4	INP; 3	CZE; 3	GBR; 3	RSM; 1	ARA; Ret	JPN; 3	AUS; 1	MAL; 2	**VAL**; 2		**2nd**	**295**
2015	MotoGP	Yamaha	QAT; 1	AME; 3	ARG; 1	SPA; 3	FRA; 2	ITA; 3	CAT; 2	**NED**; 1	GER; 3	INP; 3	CZE; 3	GBR; 1	RSM; 5	ARA; 3	JPN; 2	AUS; 4	MAL; 3	VAL; 4		**2nd**	**325**
2016	MotoGP	Yamaha	QAT; 4	ARG; 2	AME; Ret	**SPA**; 1	FRA; 2	**ITA**; Ret	CAT; 1	NED; Ret	GER; 8	AUT; 4	CZE; 2	GBR; 3	RSM; 2	ARA; 3	**JPN**; Ret	AUS; 2	MAL; 2	VAL; 4		**2nd**	**249**
2017	MotoGP	Yamaha	QAT; 3	ARG; 2	AME; 2	SPA; 10	FRA; Ret	ITA; 4	CAT; 8	NED; 1	GER; 5	CZE; 4	AUT; 7	GBR; 3	RSM	ARA; 5	JPN; Ret	AUS; 2	MAL; 7	VAL; 5		5th	208
2018	MotoGP	Yamaha	QAT; 3	ARG; 19	AME; 4	SPA; 5	FRA; 3	**ITA**; 3	CAT; 3	NED; 5	GER; 2	CZE; 4	AUT; 6	GBR; C	RSM; 7	ARA; 8	THA; 4	JPN; 4	AUS; 6	MAL; 18	VAL; 13	3rd	198
2019	MotoGP	Yamaha	QAT; 5	ARG; 2	AME; 2	SPA; 6	FRA; 5	ITA; Ret	CAT; Ret	NED; Ret	GER; 8	CZE; 6	AUT; 4	GBR; 4	RSM; 4	ARA; 8	THA; 8	JPN; Ret	AUS; 8	MAL; 4	VAL; 8	7th	174
2020	MotoGP	Yamaha	SPA; Ret	ANC; 3	CZE; 5	AUT; 5	STY; 9	RSM; 4	EMI; Ret	CAT; Ret	FRA; Ret	ARA	TER	EUR; Ret	VAL; 12	POR; 12						15th	66
2021	MotoGP	Yamaha	QAT; 12	DOH; 16	POR; Ret	SPA; 17	FRA; 11	ITA; 10	CAT; Ret	GER; 14	NED; Ret	STY; 13	AUT; 8	GBR; 18	ARA; 19	RSM; 17	AME; 15	EMI; 10	ALR; 13	VAL; 10		18th	44

=== FIM Endurance World Championship results ===
==== By year ====
(key) (Races in bold indicate pole position; races in italics indicate fastest lap)

Year	Team	Bike	Tyre	Co-rider	1	2	3	4	5	6	7	8	Pos	Pts	Ref
2000	(Japan) Castrol Honda	Honda VTR1000SPW	M	(United States) Colin Edwards	LMS	EST	SPA	SUZ; Ret	OSC	BDO			NC	0	
2001	(Japan) Team Cabin Honda	Honda VTR1000SPW	M	(United States) Colin Edwards	LMS	CZE	BRH	NÜR	SPA	SUZ; 1	OSC	BDO	14th	25	

==== Suzuka 8 Hours results ====
Year	Team	Co-Rider	Bike	Pos
2000	(Japan) Castrol Honda	(United States) Colin Edwards	Honda VTR1000SPW	Ret
2001	(Japan) Team Cabin Honda	(United States) Colin Edwards (Japan) Manabu Kamada	Honda VTR1000SPW	**1st**

== Records ==
As of the conclusion of round 18 in Valencia of the 2021 season, Valentino Rossi holds the following records:

Record	Number
Combined records (all classes)
Race starts	432
Race entries	435
Wins	115
Second places	67
Third places	53
Podium finishes	235
Points	6,357
Championship titles with different engine displacement	5 (125cc, 250cc, 500cc, 800cc, 990cc)
Longest winning career in Grand Prix racing	20 years, 311 days 1996 Czech Republic GP (18 August 1996; 125cc) to 2017 Dutch TT (25 June 2017; MotoGP)
Countries raced in	21 (Malaysia, Indonesia, Japan, Spain, Italy, France, Netherlands, Germany, United Kingdom, Austria, Czech Republic, Brazil, Australia, Argentina, South Africa, Portugal, Qatar, China, United States, Turkey, Thailand)
Wins at Circuit de Barcelona-Catalunya	10 (1997–1999, 2001–2002, 2004–2006, 2009, 2016)
Wins at Mugello Circuit	9 (1997, 1999, 2002–2008)
Wins at Circuito de Jerez-Ángel Nieto	9 (1997, 1999, 2001–2003, 2005, 2007, 2009, 2016)
Wins at Phillip Island Grand Prix Circuit	8 (1998–1999, 2001–2005, 2014)
Wins at Donington Park	7 (1997, 1999–2002, 2004–2005)
Wins at Autódromo Internacional Nelson Piquet	6 (1997, 1999–2003)
Wins at Sepang International Circuit	6 (2001, 2003–2004, 2006, 2008, 2010)
Wins at Autódromo do Estoril	5 (2001–2004, 2007)
Wins at Phakisa Freeway	3 (1999, 2001, 2004)
Wins at Shanghai International Circuit (Note: Record shared with Casey Stoner and Mika Kallio.)	2 (2005, 2008)
Wins at Sentul International Circuit (Note: Record shared with Masaki Tokudome, Tetsuya Harada, Mick Doohan, Max Biaggi, and Tadayuki Okada.)	1 (1997)
Consecutive wins at Mugello Circuit	7 (2002–2008)
Consecutive wins at Autódromo Internacional Nelson Piquet	5 (1999–2003)
Consecutive wins at Autódromo do Estoril	4 (2001–2004)
Consecutive wins at Donington Park (Note: Record shared with Kevin Schwantz and Mick Doohan.)	3 (2000–2002)
Consecutive wins at Circuito de Jerez-Ángel Nieto (Note: Record shared with Àlex Crivillé and Francesco Bagnaia.)	3 (2001–2003)
Consecutive wins at Circuit de Barcelona-Catalunya	3 (2004–2006)
Wins with Aprilia	26
Wins with Yamaha	56
500cc/MotoGP records
Race starts	372
Race entries	375
Wins	89
Second places	61
Third places	49
Podium finishes	199
Points	5,415
Wins at TT Circuit Assen	8 (2002, 2004, 2005, 2007, 2009, 2013, 2015, 2017)
Wins at Mugello Circuit	7 (2002–2008)
Wins at Circuito de Jerez-Ángel Nieto	7 (2001–2003, 2005, 2007, 2009, 2016)
Wins at Circuit de Barcelona-Catalunya	7 (2001–2002, 2004–2006, 2009, 2016)
Wins at Sepang International Circuit	6 (2001, 2003–2004, 2006, 2008, 2010)
Wins at Phillip Island Grand Prix Circuit (Note: Record shared with Casey Stoner.)	6 (2001–2005, 2014)
Wins at Donington Park	5 (2000–2002, 2004–2005)
Wins at Autódromo do Estoril	5 (2001–2004, 2007)
Wins at Brno Circuit	5 (2001, 2003, 2005, 2008–2009)
Wins at Autódromo Internacional Nelson Piquet	4 (2000–2003)
Wins at Losail International Circuit (Note: Record shared with Casey Stoner.)	4 (2005–2006, 2010, 2015)
Wins at Phakisa Freeway	2 (2001, 2004)
Wins at Shanghai International Circuit	2 (2005, 2008)
Consecutive wins at Mugello Circuit	7 (2002–2008)
Consecutive wins at Autódromo Internacional Nelson Piquet	4 (2000–2003)
Consecutive wins at Autódromo do Estoril	4 (2001–2004)
Consecutive wins at Donington Park (Note: Record shared with Kevin Schwantz and Mick Doohan.)	3 (2000–2002)
Consecutive wins at Circuito de Jerez-Ángel Nieto (Note: Record shared with Àlex Crivillé and Francesco Bagnaia.)	3 (2001–2003)
Consecutive wins at Circuit de Barcelona-Catalunya	3 (2004–2006)
Fastest laps in a season (Note: Record shared with Marc Márquez.)	12 (2003)
Consecutive podium finishes	23 (2002 Portuguese GP–2004 South African GP)
Championship titles with Yamaha	4 (2004–2005, 2008–2009)
Consecutive championship titles with different constructors (Note: Record shared with Eddie Lawson.)	2 (2003–2004)
Consecutive wins with different constructors	2 (2003 Valencian GP–2004 South African GP)
Wins with Yamaha	56
Wins in a season with Yamaha	11 (2005)
Consecutive wins with Yamaha	5 (2005 Chinese GP–2005 Dutch TT, 2008 United States GP–2008 Japanese GP)
Championship titles with different motorcycles	4 (500cc Honda, 990cc Honda, 990cc Yamaha, 800cc Yamaha)
Championship titles with different engine displacement	3 (500cc, 800cc, 990cc)
Championship titles with different engine configuration (Note: Record shared with Giacomo Agostini.)	2 (two-stroke engine, four-stroke engine)
Wins race with different engine displacement	4 (500cc, 800cc, 990cc, 1000cc)
250cc records
Wins at Autódromo de Buenos Aires Juan y Oscar Gálvez (Note: Record shared with Tom Phillis, Arthur Wheeler, Tarquinio Provini, Jean-François Baldé, Sito Pons, Tadayuki Okada, Max Biaggi, and Olivier Jacque.)	1 (1998)
Wins at Phakisa Freeway (Note: Record shared with Shinya Nakano, Daijiro Kato, Marco Melandri, Manuel Poggiali, and Dani Pedrosa.)	1 (1999)
125cc records
Wins in a season	11 (1997)
Wins at Shah Alam Circuit (Note: Record shared with Loris Capirossi, Alessandro Gramigni, Dirk Raudies, Noboru Ueda, Garry McCoy, and Stefano Perugini.)	1 (1997)
Wins at Autódromo Internacional Nelson Piquet (Note: Record shared with Masaki Tokudome, Haruchika Aoki, Noboru Ueda, Simone Sanna, Youichi Ui, Masao Azuma, Jorge Lorenzo, and Héctor Barberá.)	1 (1997)
Wins at Sentul International Circuit (Note: Record shared with Masaki Tokudome.)	1 (1997)

== Car racing records ==
=== Career summary ===
Season	Series	Car	Team	Races	Wins	Poles	F/laps	Podiums	Points	Position
1998	Monza Rally Show	Ford Escort	Martini Rally	1	0	0	0	0	0	NC
1999	Monza Rally Show	Subaru Impreza WRC	Breil WRC Team	1	0	0	0	0	4	8th
2000	Monza Rally Show	Subaru Impreza WRC	Beta-Husky Rally Monza Team	1	0	0	0	0	0	NC
2002	World Rally Championship	Peugeot 206 WRC	Michelin Grifone	1	0	0	0	0	0	NC
2003	Monza Rally Show	Toyota Corolla WRC	Nastro Azzurro Monza Rally Team	1	0	0	0	0	6	7th
2004	Monza Rally Show	Toyota Corolla WRC	Alice WRC Team	1	0	0	0	1	15	**3rd**
2005	Monza Rally Show	Subaru Impreza WRC	Subaru World Rally Team	1	0	0	0	1	18	**2nd**
2006	World Rally Championship	Subaru Impreza WRC04	Imatra RC	1	0	0	0	0	0	NC
2006	Monza Rally Show	Ford Focus RS WRC	Fastweb Imatra Rally Team	1	1	0	0	1	25	**1st**
2006	Formula One	Ferrari 248 F1	Scuderia Ferrari Marlboro	Test driver						
2006	DTM	AMG-Mercedes C-Class	Imatra-AMG Team	Test driver						
2007	Monza Rally Show	Ford Focus RS WRC	Beta Rally Team	1	1	0	0	1	25	**1st**
2007	DTM	AMG-Mercedes C-Class	Imatra-AMG Team	Test driver						
2008	World Rally Championship	Ford Focus RS WRC 07	Stobart VK M-Sport Ford Rally Team	1	0	0	0	0	0	NC
2008	Monza Rally Show	Ford Focus RS WRC	Beta Rally Team	1	0	0	0	1	18	**2nd**
2008	Formula One	Ferrari F2008	Scuderia Ferrari Marlboro	Test driver						
2009	Monza Rally Show	Ford Focus RS WRC	Monster Energy-Beta Team	1	0	0	0	1	18	**2nd**
2010	Formula One	Ferrari F10	Scuderia Ferrari Marlboro	Test driver						
2011	Monza Rally Show	Ford Focus RS WRC	Monster Energy-Sic58 RallyTeam	1	0	0	0	1	18	**2nd**
2012	Blancpain Endurance Series	Ferrari 458 Italia GT3	Kessel Racing Ferrari	2	0	0	0	0	4	35th
2012	Monza Rally Show	Ford Focus RS WRC	Monster Energy Rally Team	1	1	0	0	1	25	**1st**
2013	NASCAR Nationwide Series	Toyota Camry	Monster Energy Team	Test driver						
2013	Monza Rally Show	Ford Focus RS WRC	Monster Energy Team	1	0	0	0	1	18	**2nd**
2014	Monza Rally Show	Ford Focus RS WRC	Monster Energy Team	1	0	0	0	1	18	**2nd**
2015	Monza Rally Show	Ford Focus RS WRC	Monster Energy VR46 Rally Team	1	1	0	0	1	25	**1st**
2015	Goodwood Festival of Speed	Mazda 787B	Renown Mazdaspeed	Autocar event						
2015	Goodwood Festival of Speed	Porsche 962	Rothmans Porsche Team	Autocar event						
2015	Goodwood Festival of Speed	Lancia Delta S4	Martini Scuderia Lancia	Autocar event						
2016	Monza Rally Show	Ford Focus RS WRC	Monster Energy VR46 Rally Team	1	1	0	0	1	25	**1st**
2017	Monza Rally Show	Ford Focus RS WRC	Monster Energy VR46 Rally Team	1	1	0	0	1	25	**1st**
2018	Monza Rally Show	Ford Focus RS WRC	Monster Energy VR46 Rally Team	1	1	0	0	1	25	**1st**
2019	Gulf 12 Hours	Ferrari 488 GT3	Monster Energy VR46 Kessel Racing	1	0	0	0	1	N/A	**3rd**
2019	Formula One	Mercedes AMG F1 W08 EQ Power+	Mercedes AMG Petronas Motorsport	Swap rider event						
2020	Gulf 12 Hours	Ferrari 488 GT3	Monster VR46 Kessel Racing	1	0	0	0	1	N/A	**3rd**
2022	GT World Challenge Europe Endurance Cup	Audi R8 LMS Evo	Monster VR46 Team WRT	5	0	0	0	0	30	16th
2022	GT World Challenge Europe Sprint Cup	Audi R8 LMS Evo	Monster VR46 Team WRT	10	0	0	0	0	8	16th
2023	24H GT Series - GT3	BMW M4 GT3	KFC VR46 with Team WRT	1	0	0	0	1	NC	NC
2023	GT World Challenge Europe Endurance Cup	BMW M4 GT3	Team WRT	5	0	0	0	0	13	15th
2023	GT World Challenge Europe Sprint Cup	BMW M4 GT3	Team WRT	10	1	1	0	3	50	5th
2023	Intercontinental GT Challenge	BMW M4 GT3	Team WRT	3	0	0	0	1	38	13th
2023	Le Mans Cup - GT3	BMW M4 GT3	Team WRT	2	1	0	0	1	0	NC†
2023	Gulf 12 Hours	BMW M4 GT3	BMW M Team WRT	1	0	0	0	1	N/A	**2nd**
2024	FIA World Endurance Championship - LMGT3	BMW M4 GT3	Team WRT	8	0	0	1	2	61	6th
2024	GT World Challenge Europe Endurance Cup	BMW M4 GT3	Team WRT	5	0	0	0	0	34	9th
2024	GT World Challenge Europe Sprint Cup	BMW M4 GT3	Team WRT	4	1	1	0	2	27	8th
2024	Intercontinental GT Challenge	BMW M4 GT3	BMW M Team WRT	2	0	0	0	0	14	17th
2025	FIA World Endurance Championship - LMGT3	BMW M4 GT3	Team WRT	8	0	1	0	2	52	8th
2025	Intercontinental GT Challenge	BMW M4 GT3	BMW M Team WRT	3	1	0	0	2	47	6th
2025	GT World Challenge Europe Endurance Cup	BMW M4 GT3	BMW M Team WRT	3	0	0	0	0	0	NC
2025	GT World Challenge Europe Sprint Cup	BMW M4 GT3	BMW M Team WRT	2	1	0	1	1	16.5	13th
2026	Intercontinental GT Challenge	BMW M4 GT3	BMW M Team WRT	1	0	0	0	1	15*	**3rd***
2026	GT World Challenge Europe Endurance Cup	BMW M4 GT3	BMW M Team WRT	5	0	0	0	0	11*	16th*
2026	GT World Challenge Europe Sprint Cup	BMW M4 GT3	BMW M Team WRT	10	0	1	0	0	33.5	7th
Total				NA						

^{†} Guest driver ineligible to score points.
^{*} Season still in progress.

=== Monza Rally Show ===
Rossi participated in the Monza Rally Show championship using Ford Fiesta RS WRC car and won the title 7 times (2006–2007, 2012, 2015–2018) and became the holder of the most titles in this event.

==== Summary ====
Season	Car	Team	Wins	Podiums	Placed
1998	Ford	Martini Rally	0	0	NC
1999	Subaru	Breil WRC Team	0	0	8th
2000	Subaru	Beta-Husky Rally Monza Team	0	0	NC
2003	Toyota	Nastro Azzurro Monza Rally Team	0	0	7th
2004	Toyota	Alice WRC Team	0	1	**3rd**
2005	Subaru	Subaru World Rally Team	0	1	**2nd**
2006	Ford	Fastweb Imatra Rally Team	1	1	**1st**
2007	Ford	Beta Rally Team	1	1	**1st**
2008	Ford	Beta Rally Team	0	1	**2nd**
2009	Ford	Monster Energy-Beta Team	0	1	**2nd**
2011	Ford	Monster Energy-Sic58 RallyTeam	0	1	**2nd**
2012	Ford	Monster Energy Rally Team	1	1	**1st**
2013	Ford	Monster Energy Team	0	1	**2nd**
2014	Ford	Monster Energy Team	0	1	**2nd**
2015	Ford	Monster Energy VR46 Rally Team	1	1	**1st**
2016	Ford	Monster Energy VR46 Rally Team	1	1	**1st**
2017	Ford	Monster Energy VR46 Rally Team	1	1	**1st**
2018	Ford	Monster Energy VR46 Rally Team	1	1	**1st**
Total	1998–2018		**7**	**14**	

=== Complete WRC results ===
(key)

Year	Team	Car	1	2	3	4	5	6	7	8	9	10	11	12	13	14	15	16	Pos	Pts
2002	Michelin Grifone	Peugeot 206 WRC	MON	SWE	FRA	ESP	CYP	ARG	GRE	KEN	FIN	GER	ITA	NZL	AUS	GBR; Ret			NC	0
2006	Imatra RC	Subaru Impreza WRC04	MON	SWE	MEX	ESP	FRA	ARG	ITA	GRE	GER	FIN	JPN	CYP	TUR	AUS	NZL; 11	GBR	NC	0
2008	Stobart VK M-Sport Ford Rally Team	Ford Focus RS WRC 07	MON	SWE	MEX	ARG	JOR	ITA	GRE	TUR	FIN	GER	NZL	ESP	FRA	JPN	GBR; 12		NC	0

=== Complete Blancpain Endurance Series results ===
(key)

Year	Team	Car	Class	1	2	3	4	5	6	Pos.	Points
2012	Kessel Racing Ferrari	Ferrari 458 Italia GT3	Pro-Am	MON; 18	SIL	LEC	SPA	NÜR; 19	NAV	NC	0

=== Complete Gulf 12 Hours ===
Year	Team	Co-Driver	2nd Co-Driver	Car	Engine	Venue	Class	Laps	Pos
2019	(Switzerland) **Monster Energy VR46 Kessel Racing**	(Italy) **Luca Marini**	(Italy) **Alessio Salucci**	**Ferrari 488 GT3**	**Ferrari 3.9 L Twin-Turbo V8**	**Yas Marina**	**Pro-Am**	**N/A**	**3rd**
2020	(Switzerland) **Monster VR46 Kessel Racing**	(Italy) **Luca Marini**	(Italy) **Alessio Salucci**	**Ferrari 488 GT3**	**Ferrari 3.9 L Twin-Turbo V8**	**Sakhir**	**Pro-Am**	**168+1**	**3rd**
2023	(Belgium) **BMW M Team WRT**	(United Kingdom) **Nick Yelloly**	(Belgium) **Dries Vanthoor**	**BMW M4 GT3**	**BMW 3.0 L S55 twin-turbo I6**	**Yas Marina**	**Pro**	**348**	**2nd**

=== GT World Challenge Europe ===
In 2022, Rossi return to the track to compete in car racing in the GT World Challenge Europe, joining Belgian outfit Team WRT. Rossi, who called time on an illustrious motorcycling career spanning more than two decades in 2021, had previously spoken of a desire to move into car racing, and underwent a test with Team WRT in Ricardo Tormo Circuit, Valencia in December. Rossi will drive an Audi R8 LMS in the endurance and sprint categories, and will sport the number 46, the same number he raced with in MotoGP.

=== Complete GT World Challenge Europe Endurance Cup results ===
(key) (Races in bold indicate pole position) (Races in italics indicate fastest lap)

Year	Co-Driver	Team	Car	Class	1	2	3	4	5	6	7	Pos.	Points
2022	(Switzerland) Nico Müller (Belgium) Frédéric Vervisch	(Italy) Monster VR46 Team WRT	Audi R8 LMS Evo II	Pro	IMO 17	LEC 5	SPA; 6H 12	SPA; 12H 17	SPA; 24H 17	HOC 5	CAT 6	16th	30
2023	(Brazil) Augusto Farfus (Belgium) Maxime Martin	(Belgium) BMW M Team WRT	BMW M4 GT3	Pro	MON Ret	LEC 8	SPA; 6H 13	SPA; 12H 9	SPA; 24H 6	NUR 49†	CAT Ret	15th	13
2024	(Switzerland) Raffaele Marciello (Belgium) Maxime Martin	(Belgium) Team WRT	BMW M4 GT3	Pro	LEC 4	SPA; 6H 28	SPA; 12H 10	SPA; 24H 24	NUR 18	MON 5	JED 5	9th	34
2025	(Denmark) Kevin Magnussen (Germany) René Rast	(Belgium) Team WRT	BMW M4 GT3 Evo	Pro	LEC	MON	SPA; 6H 13	SPA; 12H 14	SPA; 24H 11	NUR	CAT	NC	0
2026	(United Kingdom) Dan Harper (Germany) Max Hesse	(Belgium) Team WRT	BMW M4 GT3 Evo	Pro	LEC 12	MON Ret	SPA; 6H 9	SPA; 12H 8	SPA; 24H 6	NUR	POR	16th*	11*

=== Complete 24 Hours of Spa results ===
Year	Team	Co-Drivers	Car	Class	Laps	Pos.	Class Pos.
2022	(Italy) Monster VR46 with Team WRT	(Switzerland) Nico Müller (Belgium) Frédéric Vervisch	Audi R8 LMS Evo II	Pro	531	17th	14th
2023	(Belgium) Team WRT	(Brazil) Augusto Farfus (Belgium) Maxime Martin	BMW M4 GT3	Pro	537	6th	6th
2024	(Belgium) Team WRT	(Switzerland) Raffaele Marciello (Belgium) Maxime Martin	BMW M4 GT3	Pro	475	24th	13th
2025	(Belgium) Team WRT	(Denmark) Kevin Magnussen (Germany) René Rast	BMW M4 GT3	Pro	548	11th	10th
2026	(Belgium) Team WRT	(United Kingdom) Dan Harper (Germany) Max Hesse	BMW M4 GT3	Pro			

=== Complete GT World Challenge Europe Sprint Cup results ===
(key) (Races in bold indicate pole position) (Races in italics indicate fastest lap)

Year	Co-Driver	Team	Car	Class	1	2	3	4	5	6	7	8	9	10	Pos.	Points
2022	(Belgium) Frédéric Vervisch	(Italy) Monster VR46 Team WRT	Audi R8 LMS Evo II	Pro	BRH; 1; 13	BRH; 2; 8	MAG; 1; 15	MAG; 2; 11	ZAN; 1; 14	ZAN; 2; 16	MIS; 1 Ret	MIS; 2; 5	VAL; 1; 11	VAL; 2 Ret	16th	8
2023	(Belgium) Maxime Martin	(Belgium) BMW M Team WRT	BMW M4 GT3	Pro	BRH; 1; 14	BRH; 2; 2	MIS; 1; 8	MIS; 2; 1	HOC; 1; 8	HOC; 2; 7	VAL; 1; 8	VAL; 2 Ret	ZAN; 1; 3	**ZAN**; **2**; 7	5th	50
2024	(Belgium) Maxime Martin	(Belgium) Team WRT	BMW M4 GT3	Pro	BRH; 1; 15	BRH; 2; 25	**MIS**; **1**; 1	MIS; 2; 3	HOC; 1	HOC; 2	MAG; 1	MAG; 2	CAT; 1	CAT; 2	8th	27
2025	(Switzerland) Raffaele Marciello	(Belgium) Team WRT	BMW M4 GT3 Evo	Pro	BRH; 1	BRH; 2	ZAN; 1	ZAN; 2	MIS; 1; 1	MIS; 2; 21	MAG; 1	MAG; 2	VAL; 1	VAL; 2	13th	16.5
2026	(Germany) Max Hesse	(Belgium) Team WRT	BMW M4 GT3 Evo	Pro	BRH; 1; 14	BRH; 2; 4	**MIS**; **1**; 6	MIS; 2; 4	MAG; 1; 6	MAG; 2; 9	ZAN; 1	ZAN; 2	BAR; 1	BAR; 2	7th*	25*

^{*} Season still in progress.

=== Complete 24H GT Series results ===
Year	Team	Co-Drivers	Car	Class	1	2	3	Pos.	Class Pos.
2022–23	(Italy) KFC VR46 with Team WRT	(Indonesia) Sean Gelael (Germany) Max Hesse (Belgium) Maxime Martin (United Kingdom) Tim Whale	BMW M4 GT3	**Pro**	KUW	DUB; 3	ABU	NC	NC

=== Complete Intercontinental GT Challenge results ===
Year	Team	Co-Drivers	Car	Class	1	2	3	4	5	Pos.	Pts.	Class Pos.	Pts.
2023	(Belgium) Team WRT 46	(Brazil) Augusto Farfus (Belgium) Maxime Martin	BMW M4 GT3	**Pro**	BAT; 6	KYA	SPA; 6	IND	GUL	NA	NA	13th	38
2023	(Belgium) BMW M Team WRT	(Belgium) Dries Vanthoor (United Kingdom) Nick Yelloly	BMW M4 GT3	**Pro**	BAT	KYA	SPA	IND	GUL; 2	NA	NA	13th	38
2024	(Belgium) Team WRT	(Switzerland) Raffaele Marciello (Belgium) Maxime Martin	BMW M4 GT3	**Pro**	BAT; 4	NUR	SPA; 9	IND		NA	NA	17th	14
2025	(Belgium) Team WRT	(Switzerland) Raffaele Marciello (Belgium) Charles Weerts (Germany) René Rast (South Africa) Kelvin van der Linde (Denmark) Kevin Magnussen	BMW M4 GT3	**Pro**	BAT; 2	NUR	SPA; 8	SUZ	IND; 1	NA	NA	6th	47
2026	(Belgium) Team WRT	(Switzerland) Raffaele Marciello (Brazil) Augusto Farfus	BMW M4 GT3	**Pro**	BAT; 3	NUR	SPA	SUZ	IND	NA	NA	3rd*	15*

=== Complete Bathurst 12 Hours results ===
Year	Team	Co-Drivers	Car	Class	Laps	Pos.	Class Pos.
2023	(Belgium) Team WRT	(Belgium) Maxime Martin (Brazil) Augusto Farfus	BMW M4 GT3	A-GT3 Pro	322	6th	6th
2024	(Belgium) Team WRT	(Belgium) Maxime Martin (Switzerland) Raffaele Marciello	BMW M4 GT3	A-GT3 Pro	275	5th	5th
2025	(Belgium) Team WRT	(Belgium) Charles Weerts (Switzerland) Raffaele Marciello	BMW M4 GT3	Pro Cup	306	**2nd**	**2nd**
2026	(Belgium) Team WRT	(Brazil) Augusto Farfus (Switzerland) Raffaele Marciello	BMW M4 GT3	Pro Cup	262	**3rd**	**3rd**

=== Complete Le Mans Cup results ===
(key) (Races in bold indicate pole position; results in italics indicate fastest lap)

Year	Entrant	Co-Drivers	Class	Chassis	1	2	3	4	5	6	7	Rank	Points
2023	(Belgium) Team WRT	(France) Jérôme Policand	GT3	BMW M4 GT3	CAT	LMS; 1; 13	**LMS**; **2**; 1	LEC	ARA	SPA	ALG	NC	NA

=== Complete FIA World Endurance Championship results ===
(key) (Races in bold indicate pole position; races in italics indicate fastest lap)

Year	Entrant	Class	Chassis	Engine	1	2	3	4	5	6	7	8	Rank	Points
2024	Team WRT	LMGT3	BMW M4 GT3	BMW P58 3.0 L Turbo I6	QAT; 4	IMO; 2	SPA; Ret	LMS; Ret	SÃO; 5	COA; NC	FUJ; 3	BHR; 14	6th	61
2025	Team WRT	LMGT3	BMW M4 GT3	BMW P58 3.0 L Turbo I6	QAT; 11	**IMO**; 2	SPA; 9	LMS; Ret	SÃO; 10	COA; 2	FUJ; 4	BHR; 15	8th	52

=== Complete 24 Hours of Le Mans results ===
Year	Team	Co-Drivers	Car	Class	Laps	Pos.	Class Pos.
2024	(Belgium) Team WRT	(Oman) Ahmad Al Harthy (Belgium) Maxime Martin	BMW M4 GT3	LMGT3	109	DNF	DNF
2025	(Belgium) Team WRT	(Oman) Ahmad Al Harthy (South Africa) Kelvin van der Linde	BMW M4 GT3 Evo	LMGT3	156	DNF	DNF
