= Aprilia RS =

The Aprilia RS series is a series of sport bikes made by italian manufacturer Aprilia since 1991.

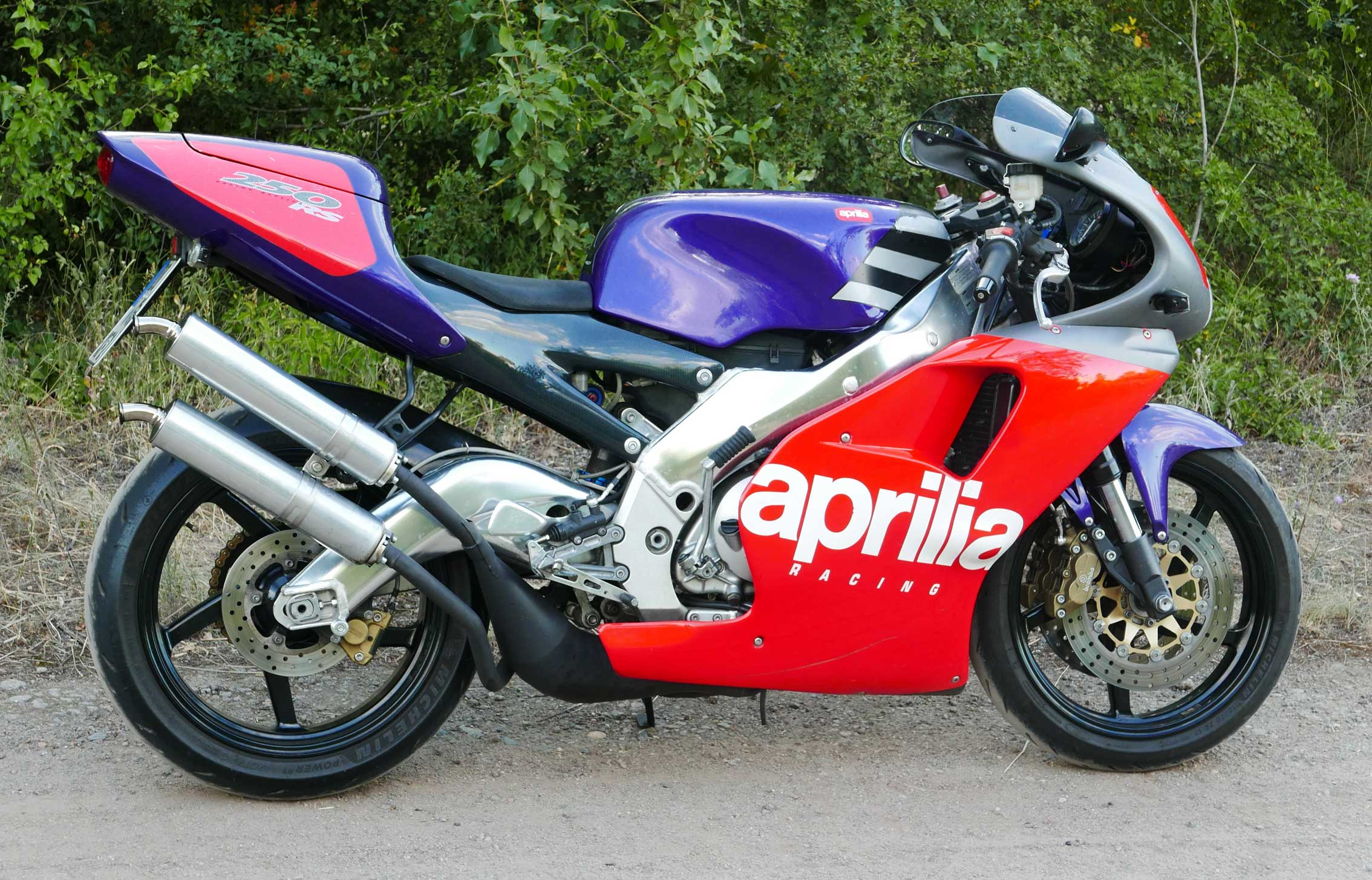
Aprilia RS250

== Single cylinder ==
- Aprilia RS50
- Aprilia RS125
  - Aprilia RS125 (four-stroke version)
  - Aprilia RS125R

== Parallel twin ==
- Aprilia RS457
- Aprilia RS660

== V-twin ==
- Aprilia RS250
