= Aprilia RS250 =

Two-stroke 249 cc sport bike made by the Italian motorcycle manufacturer Aprilia

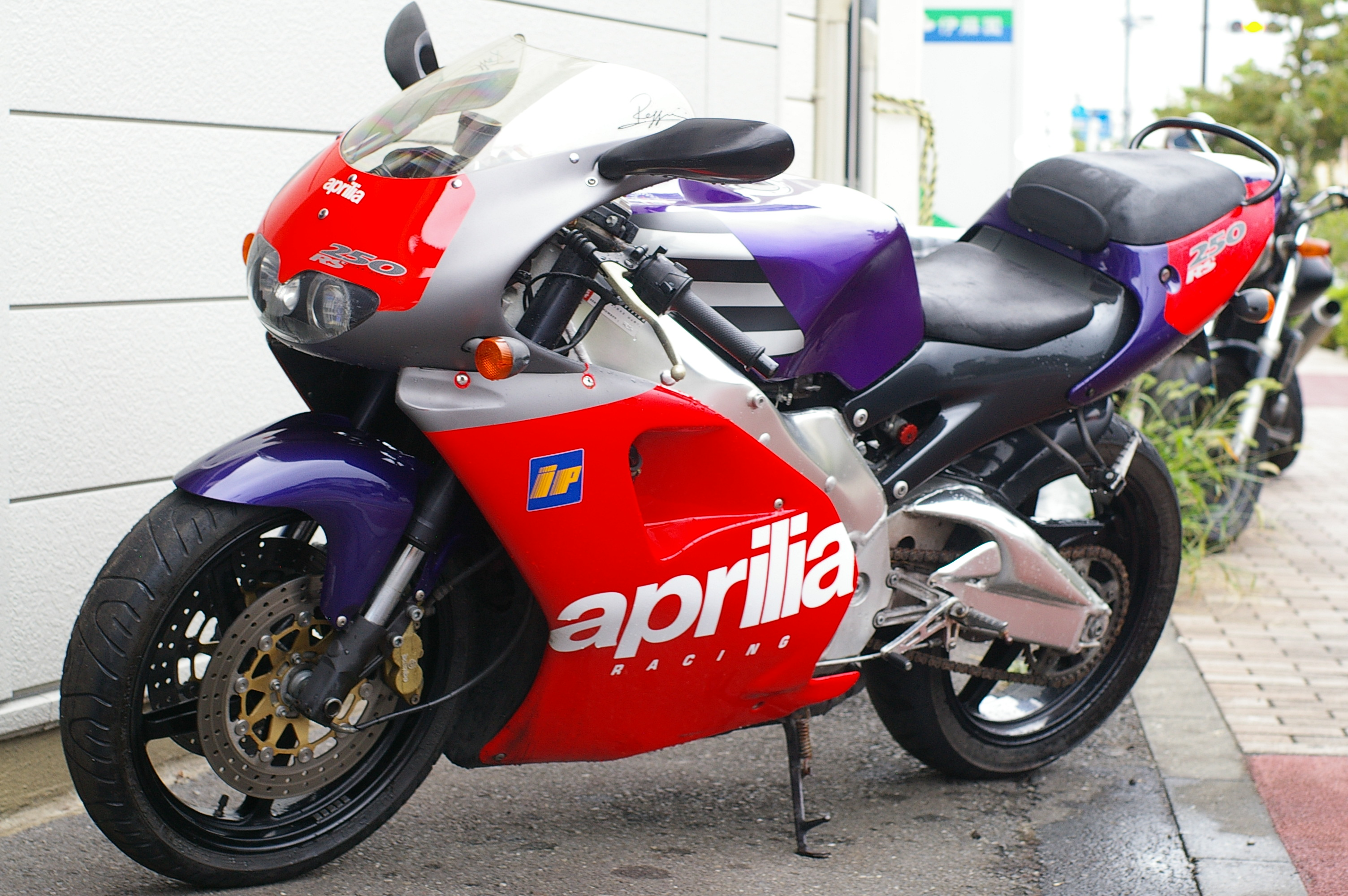
- Manufacturer: Aprilia
- Also called: GP1
- Parent company: Piaggio
- Production: 1994–2003
- Class: Sport bike
- Engine: 249 cc (15.2 cu in), 2-stroke, liquid cooled, 90-degree V-Twin
- Bore / stroke: 56 mm × 50.6 mm (2.20 in × 1.99 in)
- Power: 60 hp (45 kW; 61 PS) @ 11,000 rpm
- Torque: 39.7 N⋅m (29.3 lbf⋅ft) @ 10,750 rpm
- Transmission: 6-speed sequential, manual chain drive
- Tires: Front: 110/70ZR17; Rear: 150/60ZR17
- Wheelbase: 1,370 mm (54 in)
- Dimensions: L: 1,980 mm (78 in); W: 690 mm (27 in)
- Seat height: 810 mm (32 in)
- Weight: 141.0 kg (310.9 lb) (dry); 162.0 kg (wet)
- Related: Aprilia RSV 250

The Aprilia RS250 is a two-stroke 249 cc (15.2 cu in) sport bike of the RS series made by the Italian motorcycle manufacturer Aprilia.

The Aprilia RS250 is a race oriented motorcycle with technology derived from Aprilia's racing experience. It is inspired by the Aprilia RSW250 Grand Prix motorcycle used by riders such as Valentino Rossi, Max Biaggi and Loris Capirossi in MotoGP races.

== History ==
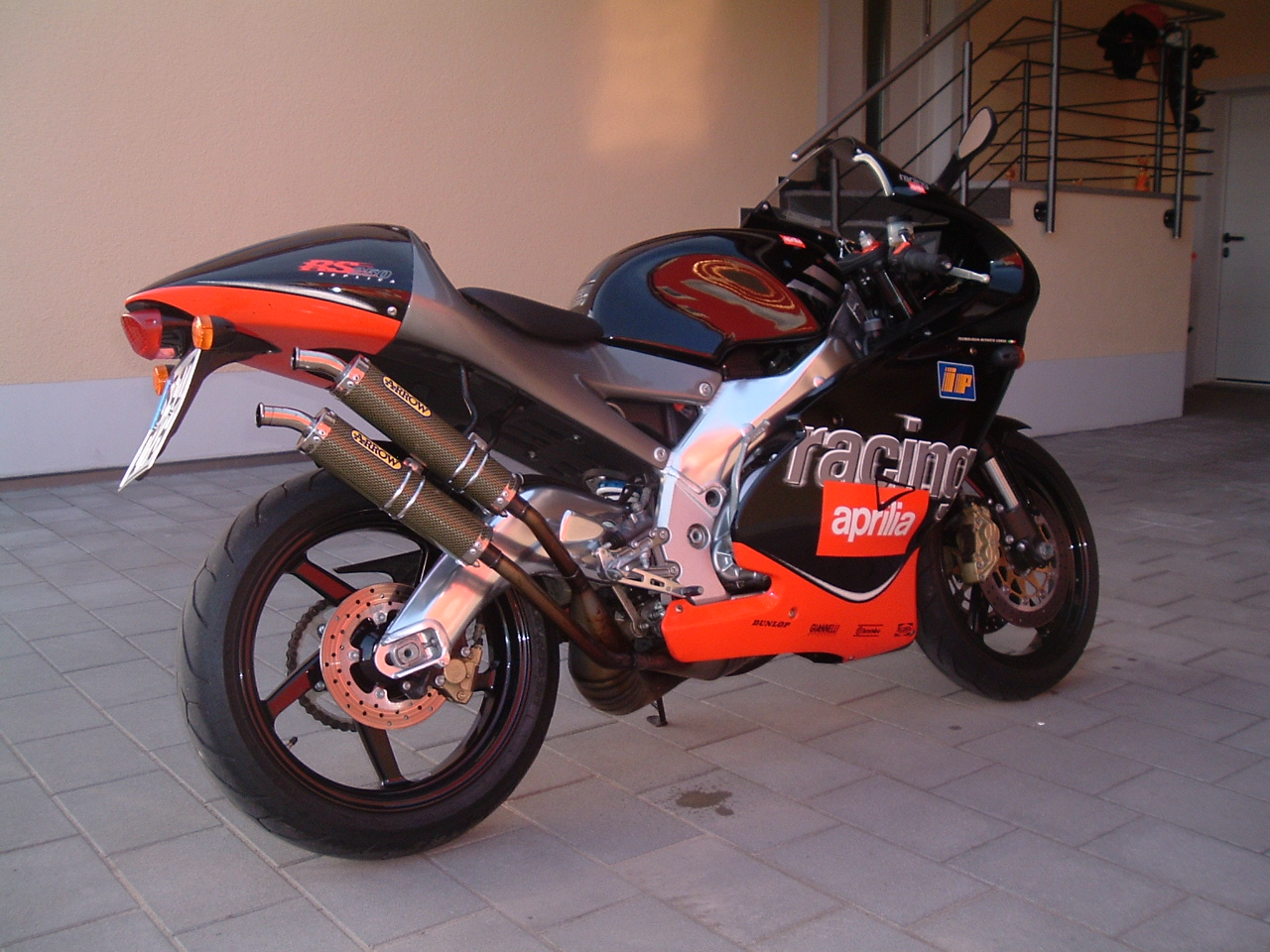
1998 Aprilia RS250

The RS250 was designed by Aprilia to resemble their GP250 bike to celebrate their success in the championship. The Aprilia RS250 is powered by a modified Suzuki RGV250 (VJ22) engine which is prepared by Aprilia, changes include a revised ECU, Aprilia-designed expansion chambers, barrels and airbox. The twin 34 mm flat slide Mikuni carburettors are retained from the RGV.

== Chassis ==
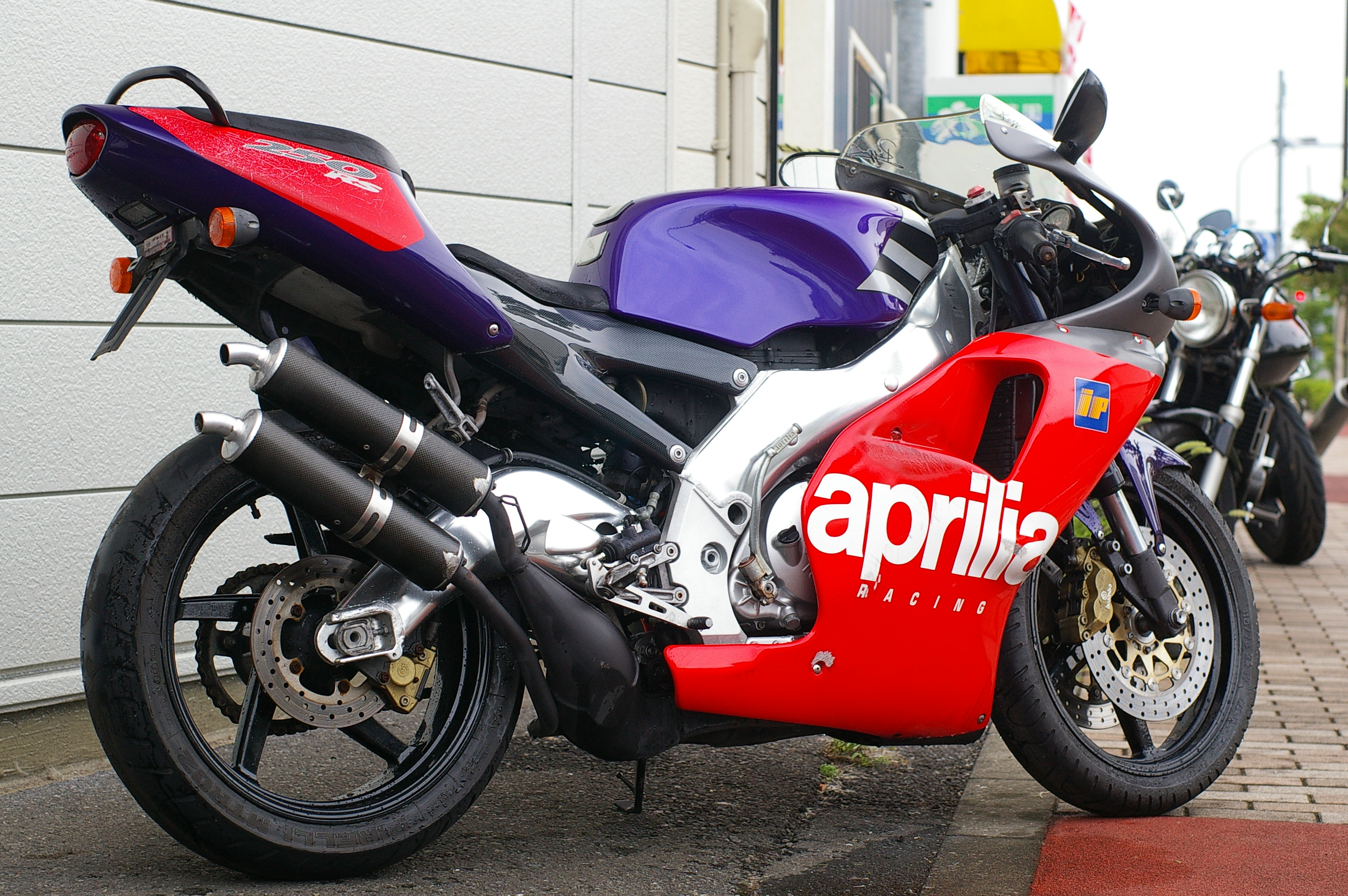
1995 Aprilia RS250

The frame is a cast twin spar aluminium/magnesium alloy with thin-walled monocoque reinforcements, with the engine as a fully stressed member manufactured by Benelli for Aprilia. The banana swingarm is made out of the same polished aluminium alloy as the rest of the frame. The reason for the swingarm's banana shape is to allow the expansion chambers to run unobstructed under the engine to improve ground clearance in turns.

The forks are 41 mm Showa (on the MY98+ models) inverted units and are adjustable for preload, compression and rebound, the rear suspension is a Sachs mono-shock which is also adjustable for preload, compression and rebound. The front brakes of the RS 250 are Brembo dual 298 mm discs with Brembo Oro four-piston calipers. The rear brake is a single 220 mm disc with a Brembo twin-piston caliper.

The front & rear rims are lightweight, 5 spokes, cast aluminum rims. They are 3.50x17 up front (3.00x17 on the older models) and 4.50x17 out back that require tires of 110/70ZR17 or 120/60ZR17 (only MY98+) and 150/60ZR17 or 160/60ZR17, respectively.

Aprilia RS250 GP1 on the road.

== Instrument panel ==
The RS gauges feature a digital instrument panel that gives the rider a variety of information. It will display maximum and average speed readings in kilometers or miles per hour, an adjustable rev limiter warning zone indicator, water temperature in choice of scale, battery charge indicator, a clock, and a chronometer that can remember up to 40 lap times.

== Revision ==
In 1998, Aprilia released an all new look for the RS250, also referred to as RS250GP1 to celebrate Aprilia's victory in the 250 cc GP racing class. Its appearance is similar to Marco Melandri's RSWGP250 bike, with the same engine and frame as the pre-1998 model. The bike has a dummy ram-air intake. Changes include:

- Revised overall bike styling with more modern senses.
- New Showa front forks and adjustable rear ride height
- New style instrument panel with new functionality.
- New rims and tyres: the front rim is now a 3.50x17, instead of 3.00x17 as used on pre-1998 model. The factory mount front tire is a 120/60ZR17 instead of the 110/70R17 mounted on the pre-1998

Technical specifications Aprilia RS 250
Model Year	1994 – 1997	1998 – 2003
Type	LD00	LDA0
Fairing	"Mk I"	"Mk II"
VIN	ZD4LD00…	ZD4LDA0…
Battery	12 V, 4 Ah	
Starter	Kickstarter	
Engine	Liquid cooled, twin cylinder V-90°, two stroke (Suzuki VJ22A) with reed valve intake and exhaust valve	
Displacement	249.25 cc	
Bore / Stroke	56 mm / 50.6 mm	
Clutch	Multi plate in oil-bath	
Compression ratio	12 ± 0.7:1	
Power	45 kW / 60.35 hp @ 11000/min	46 kW / 61.69 hp @ 11000/min
Torque	39.7 Nm @ 10750/min	40 Nm @ 11000/min
Power/Weight ratio	0.2778 kW/kg	0.2754 kW/kg
Carburettor	2× Mikuni TM 34 SS flat slide	
Ignition system / Spark plug	Digital capacitor discharge ignition (CDI) SAPC 22D70 CM7422 22c / NGK BR9ECM	Digital capacitor discharge ignition (CDI) SAPC 22D70 CM7423 23c / NGK BR9ECM
Spark advance	14° BTDC @ 1300/min	10° ±2° BTDC @ 1300/min
Exhaust valve system	Electronic, three part exhaust slide	
Resonance chamber / Silencer	LD e3 89/235 *0009*00 / LD e3 89/235 *0009*00	LD e3 89/235 *0009*00 / LD e11 0066
Noise emissions: stationary / in motion	90 dB(A) @ 5500/min / 80 dB(A)	89 dB(A) @ 5500/min / 80 dB(A)
Final drive ratio (chain)	14:42 Teeth	
Gear ratios	1. gear 11 / 27 = 1: 2.454; 2. gear 16 / 26 = 1: 1.625; 3. gear 17 / 21 = 1: 1.235; 4. gear 22 / 23 = 1: 1.045; 5. gear 24 / 22 = 1: 0.916; 6. gear 25 / 21 = 1: 0.840	
Primary drive ratio	23/59 = 1 : 2.565	
Top speed	200 km/h	210 km/h
Dry weight	141 kg	140 kg
Wet weight	162 kg	167 kg
Max. laden mass	337 kg	347 kg
Fuel capacity	16.5 l (incl. 3.5 l reserve)	19.5 l (incl. 3.6 l reserve)
Two stroke oil capacity	1.6 l (incl. 0.6 l reserve), rear mounted	1.6 l (incl. 0.3 l reserve), front mounted
Cooling system capacity	1.9 l (rear mounted)	1.9 l (front mounted)
Length / width / height	1980 mm / 690 mm / 1090 mm	1975 mm / 690 mm / 1180 mm
Ground clearance	135 mm	
Seat height	810 mm	
Wheelbase	1370 mm	1360 mm
Rake	25° 30'	
Trail	102 mm	
Wheel travel front / rear	120 mm / 130 mm	
Front forks	Marzocchi Up-Side-Down forks, adjustable, 40 mm diameter 20 mm axle, spring only in the left damping in the right fork leg	Showa Up-Side-Down forks, adjustable, 41 mm diameter 25 mm axle, springs and damping elements in both legs
Rear shock	Sachs Mono-Shock with adjustable preload, compression and rebound. APS Linkage system	
Frame	Cast Aluminium-Magnesium-Alloy (polished/brushed), twin spar, torsional stiffness like Grand Prix RSV 250 (197 kgm/1°)	
Swingarm	Banana swing arm, cast Aluminium-Magnesium-Alloy (polished/brushed), torsional stiffness (162 kgm/1°)	
Rear subframe	Steel	Aluminium
Brake disc front / rear	2× 298 mm / 220 mm	
Front brake pump	Brembo PS16	Brembo PSC16
Front brake caliper mounting distance	40 mm	65 mm
Speedometer	Front wheel (mechanical)	Rear wheel (hall sensor)
Tires	f: 110/70 ZR17 r: 150/60 ZR17 or 160/60 ZR17	f: 110/70 ZR17 or 120/60 ZR17 r: 150/60 ZR17 or 160/60 ZR17
Rims	f. 3.00″x17″ r. 4.50″x17″	f. 3.50″x17″ r. 4.50″x17″
Misc.	Frame bracket prepared for the assembly of a steering damper, lap-timer/stop watch, some bikes have the badge „Aprilia Racing Division Work Bikes Dept.“ with stamped VIN attached to the frame	Frame bracket prepared for the assembly of a steering damper, lap-timer/stop watch, adjustable shift indicator (new instrument panel)
