= Aprilia RS4 =

Italian sportbike

Aprilia RS125
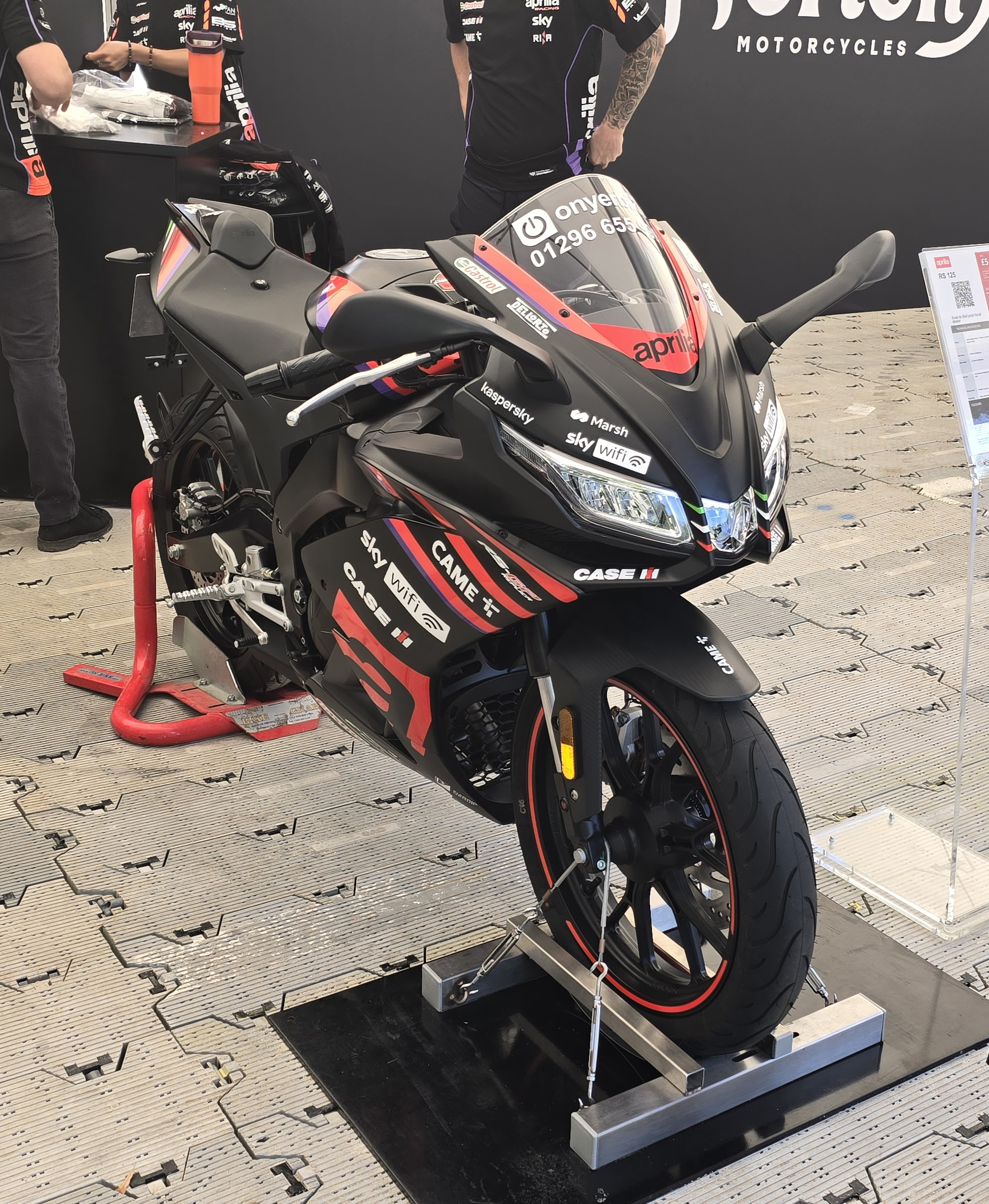
- 2024 Aprilia RS125 GP Replica
- Manufacturer: Aprilia
- Also called: Aprilia RS125 (2016–present)
- Parent company: Piaggio
- Production: since 2011
- Predecessor: Aprilia RS125
- Class: Sport bike
- Engine: 124.2 cc (8 cu in) Single-Cylinder DOHC four valve four-stroke Electronic injection
- Bore / stroke: 58.0 by 47.0 millimetres (2.28 in × 1.85 in)
- Compression ratio: 12.5 ± 0.5:1
- Transmission: 6-speed manual, Wet multi-disc cable-actuated clutch, optional Quick Shift (upshifts)
- Frame type: Perimeter frame, Die-cast Aluminium spars w/ crossed reinforcement ribs Asymmetric aluminium swingarm
- Suspension: Front: Ø40 mm inverted forks Rear: Progressive monoshock, adjustable preload
- Brakes: Front: Single Ø300 mm stainless steel disc, radial 4-piston caliper Rear: Ø218 mm stainless steel disc, single 30 mm piston caliper ABS: Bosch Dual Channel ABS
- Tires: Front: 100/80 ZR 17; Rear: 140/70 ZR 17
- Wheelbase: 1353 mm
- Dimensions: L: 1968 mm W: 760 mm [w/ mirrors] H: 1135 mm
- Seat height: 820 mm (32 in)
- Weight: 129 kg (dry); 144 kg (wet)
- Fuel capacity: 14.5 L (3.2 imp gal; 3.8 US gal); Reserve: 3.5 L (0.77 imp gal; 0.92 US gal)
- Fuel consumption: 2.71 L/100km
- Related: Aprilia RS4 50; Aprilia Tuono 125; Derbi GPR125

The Aprilia RS4 125 (sold as the RS125 since 2016) is a 125 cc class sportbike manufactured by Italian motorcycle firm Aprilia. The four-stroke RS4 125 replaces the extremely popular RS125 two-stroke race replica in Aprilia's lineup. The bike is based on the four-stroke version of the Derbi GPR125.

== Specifications ==
The powerplant is an electronically fuel-injected 4 stroke 4 valve DOHC single cylinder, with a balance shaft. A race kit is available from the manufacturer that boosts power from the standard 15 bhp to 25 bhp.

The RS4 125 is available with a quick-shift system similar to the RSV4, in which the engine halts the torque from the engine based on engine rpm, the amount of throttle being applied, and the speed of the bike. This system allows smooth, fast upshifts without the use of the clutch. This is optional on the standard bike, but included with the GP Replica model.

The chassis is a die-cast aluminium perimeter frame with an aluminium swingarm. The brakes consist of a 30 cm steel disc in front with a four-piston radial caliper, and a 22 cm steel disc with a single caliper at the rear. Complementing this for 2017 is Bosch 9.1ML single channel ABS, at the front.

For 2021, the RS125 has undergone significant changes: some restyling at the front, fully digital instruments, a wider 140-section rear tyre, Full-LED headlights, Euro 5 emission compliance and dual-channel (i.e. front and rear) ABS. The engine has also been modified: there is a new head, redesigned combustion chamber, new intake and exhaust ducts, redesigned camshafts and an iridium spark plug. The air intake and filter have been altered and the throttle body has been repositioned. There is a new exhaust system and catalyst, resulting in higher efficiency.

For 2025, the bike gains switcheable on/off traction control with an anti-rollover system, passes the Euro5+ emissions standard, and gets two new colours: Kingsnake White and Cyanide Yellow.

== Gallery ==
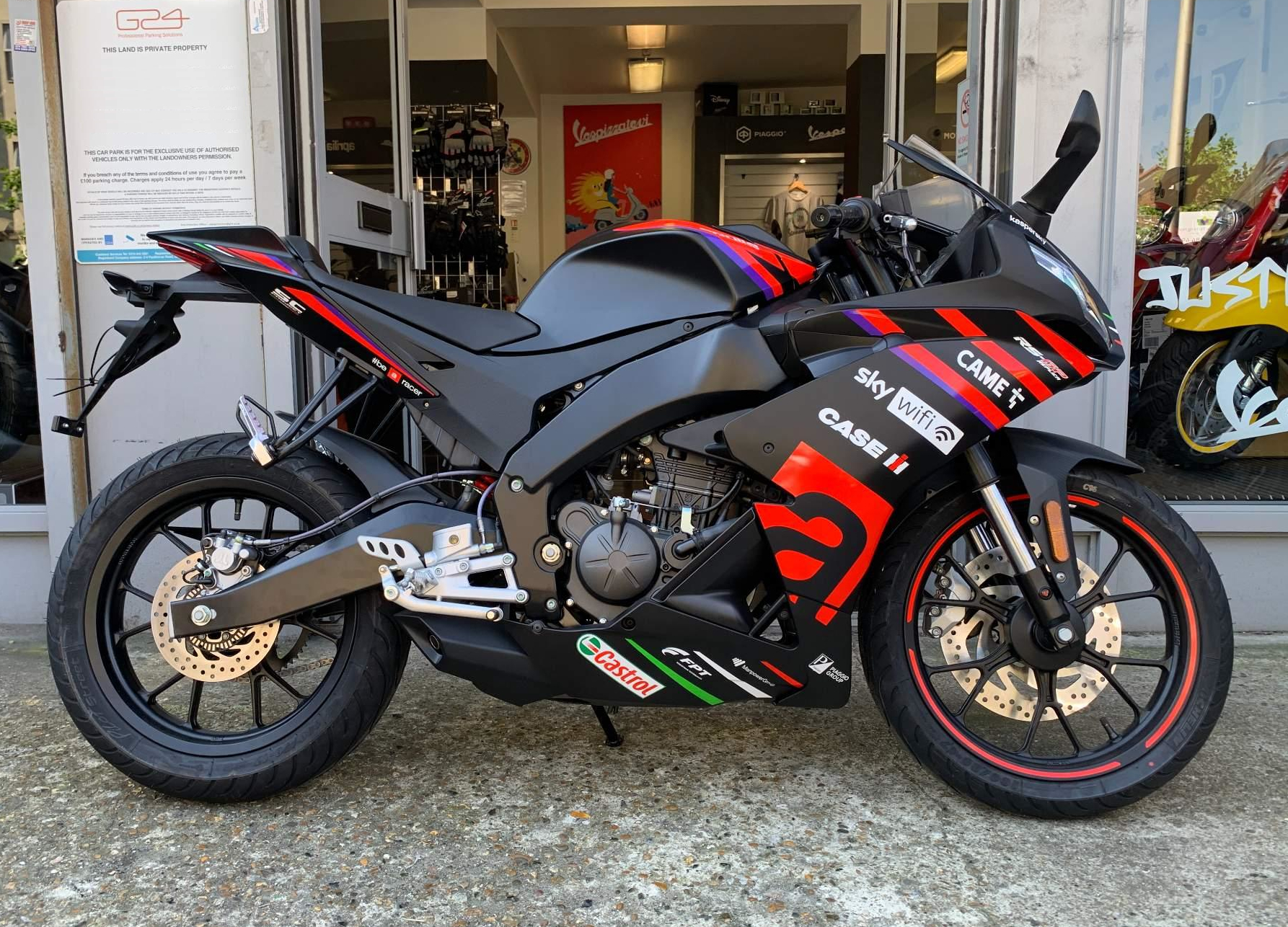
2024 Aprilia RS125 GP Replica

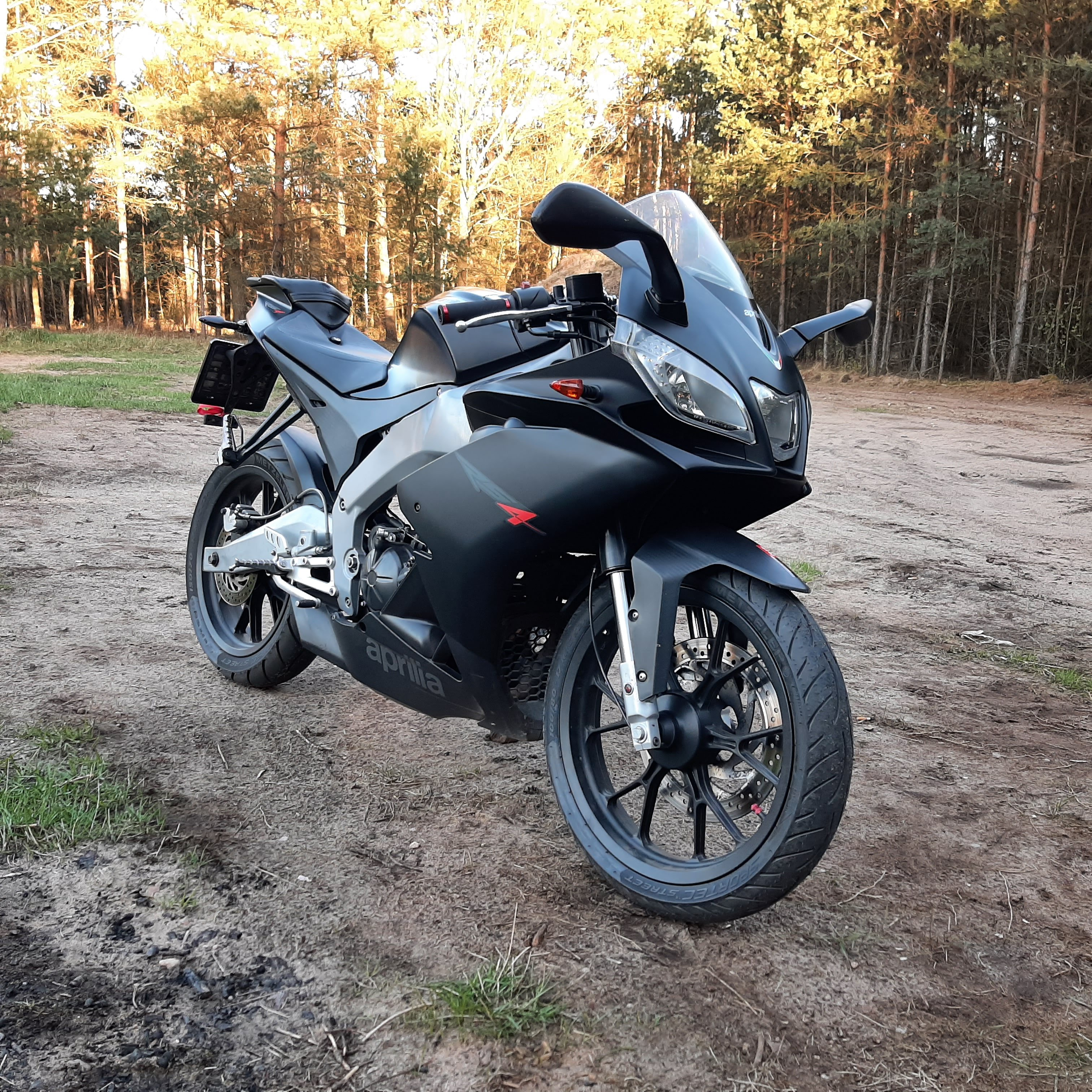
2017 Aprilia RS4 125

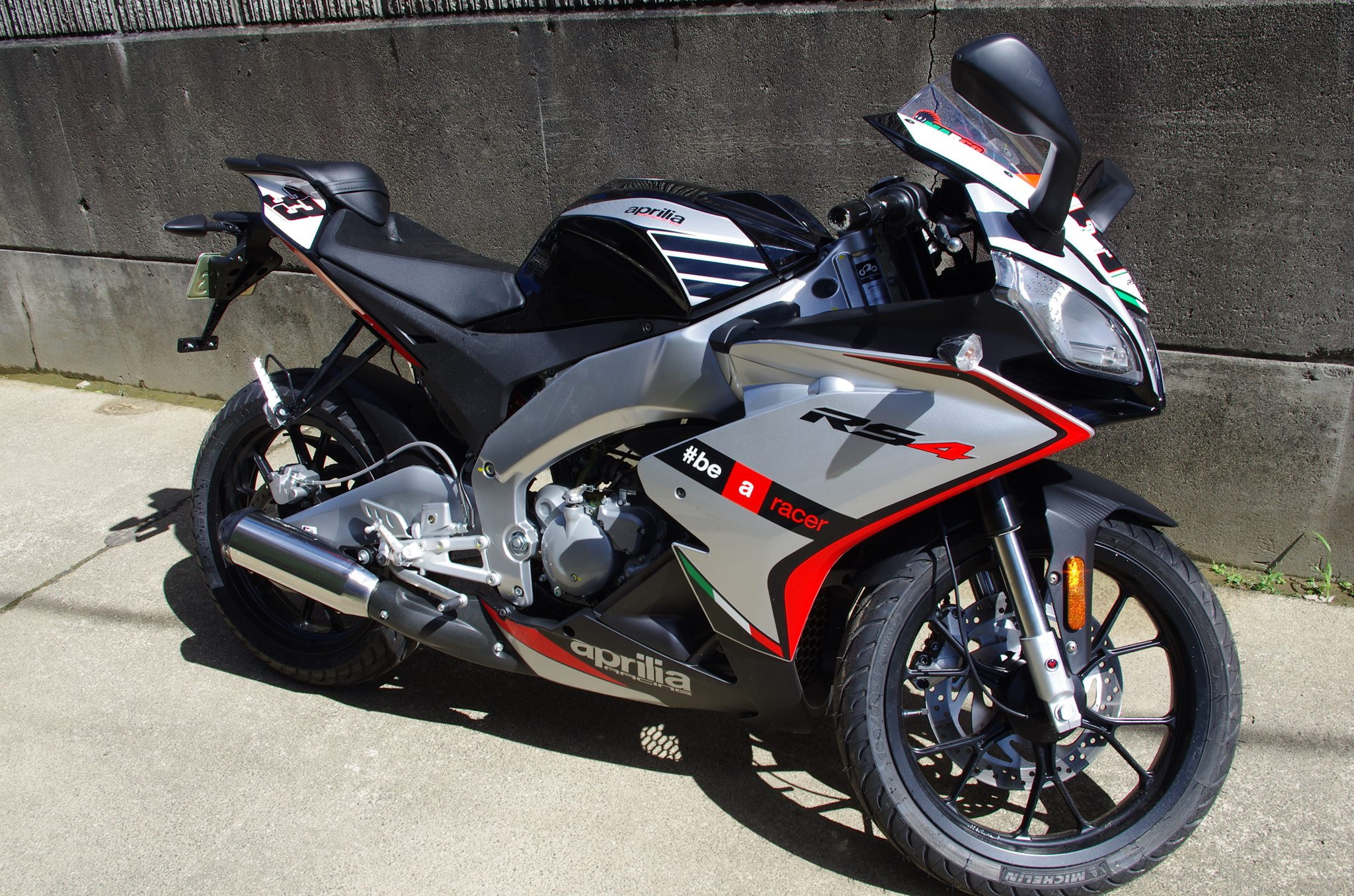
Aprilia RS4 50 SBK Edition
