= Aprilia RS125 =

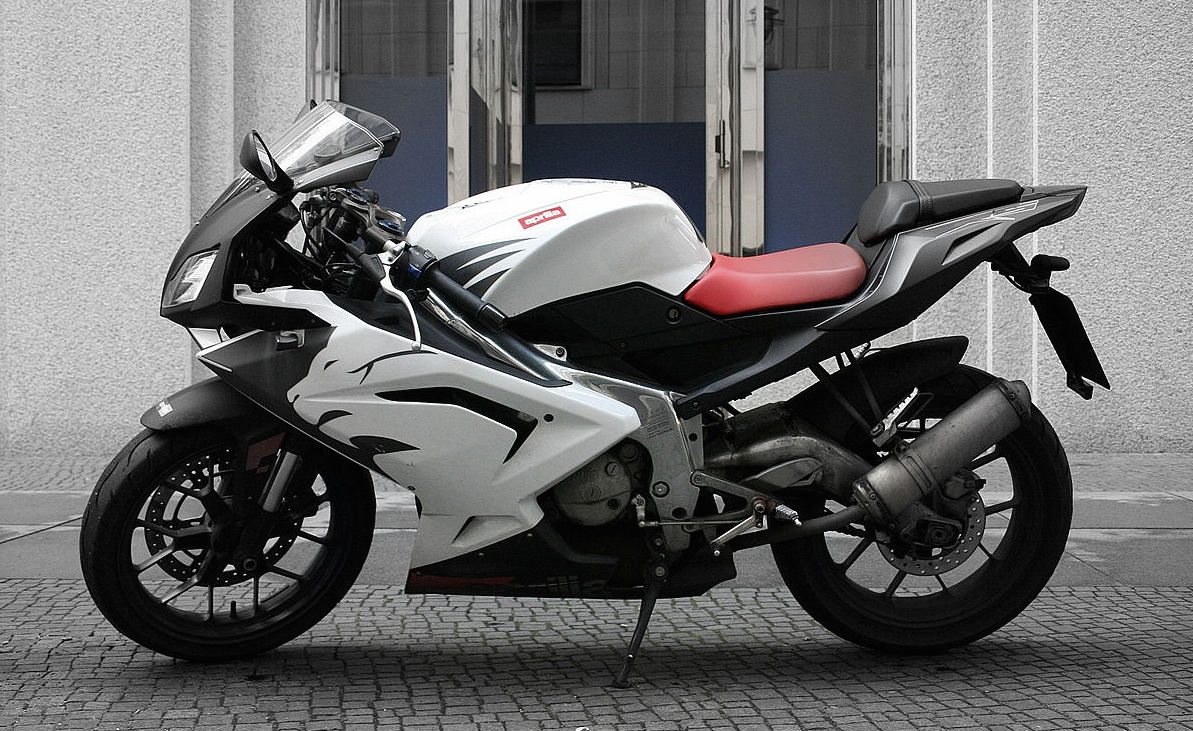
- Manufacturer: Aprilia
- Parent company: Piaggio
- Production: 1992-2010
- Predecessor: Aprilia AF1
- Successor: Aprilia RS4 125
- Class: Sport bike
- Engine: 124.8 cc (7.62 cu in) single cylinder two-stroke engine
- Bore / stroke: 54.0 mm × 54.5 mm (2.13 in × 2.15 in)
- Power: 28.2 bhp (21.0 kW) (claimed)
- Torque: 14.0 lb⋅ft (19.0 N⋅m)
- Transmission: 6 speed
- Suspension: Front : 40 mm (1.6 in) upside down hydraulic fork. Wheel travel 120 mm (4.7 in); Rear : Cast aluminium box section swingarm with asymmetric members. Hydraulic monoshock with adjustable spring preload. Wheel travel 120 mm.
- Brakes: 4 piston caliper, from 2006: radial
- Tires: Tubeless radial. Front 110/70 17-inch; rear 150/60 17-inch
- Wheelbase: 1,345 mm (53.0 in)
- Dimensions: L: 1,950 mm (77 in); W: 720 mm (28 in) at handlebars H: 1,100 mm (43 in) at windshield
- Seat height: 805 mm (31.7 in)
- Weight: 127 kg (280 lb) (dry); 137 kg (302 lb) (wet)
- Fuel capacity: 14 L (3.1 imp gal; 3.7 US gal)
- Fuel consumption: 40 mpg_{‑US} (5.9 L/100 km; 48 mpg_{‑imp})
- Related: Aprilia RS

The Aprilia RS125 is a GP derived replica sport production motorcycle. It is powered by a Rotax single cylinder 124.8 cc two-stroke engine with Nikasil coated aluminium cylinder block, and liquid cooling.

== Generations ==
=== RS125 Extrema/Replica 1992 to 1995 ===
Aprilia introduced the first RS125 in 1992. It has an angular tail section and swept front fairing, square cut headlight unit, three spoke rims, air scoops on the upper front middle fairing, Electric starter or kick start on the left hand side and analogue gauges. There was only one model variant in this year range which denoted RS 125 R on the tank and was red and black in colour. Production was 1994.

=== RS125 1995 to 1998 ===
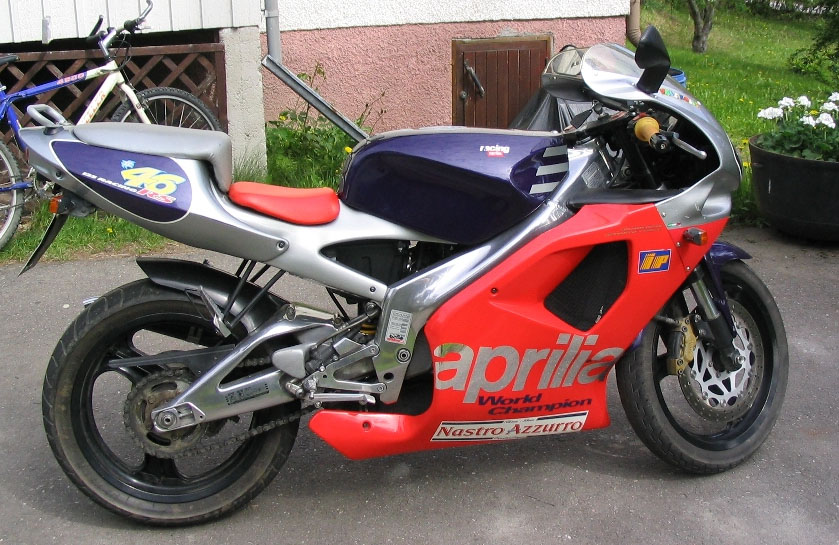
1995 Aprilia RS125

The RS125 is revised and the Extrema wording is dropped. The RS retains a lot of the appearances of the previous RS but there are some notable differences. The front air intakes are integrated into the front upper portion of the middle fairing. The headlight unit is rounded and the lip is introduced to the top centre. A digital gauge is added in place of the temperature gauge. For the Italian market the biggest change is a new engine, the Rotax 122, a new improved version to the previous Rotax 123. In most of Europe the Rotax 123 is still used up to 1997/1998 (Spain).

=== RS125 1999 to 2005 ===
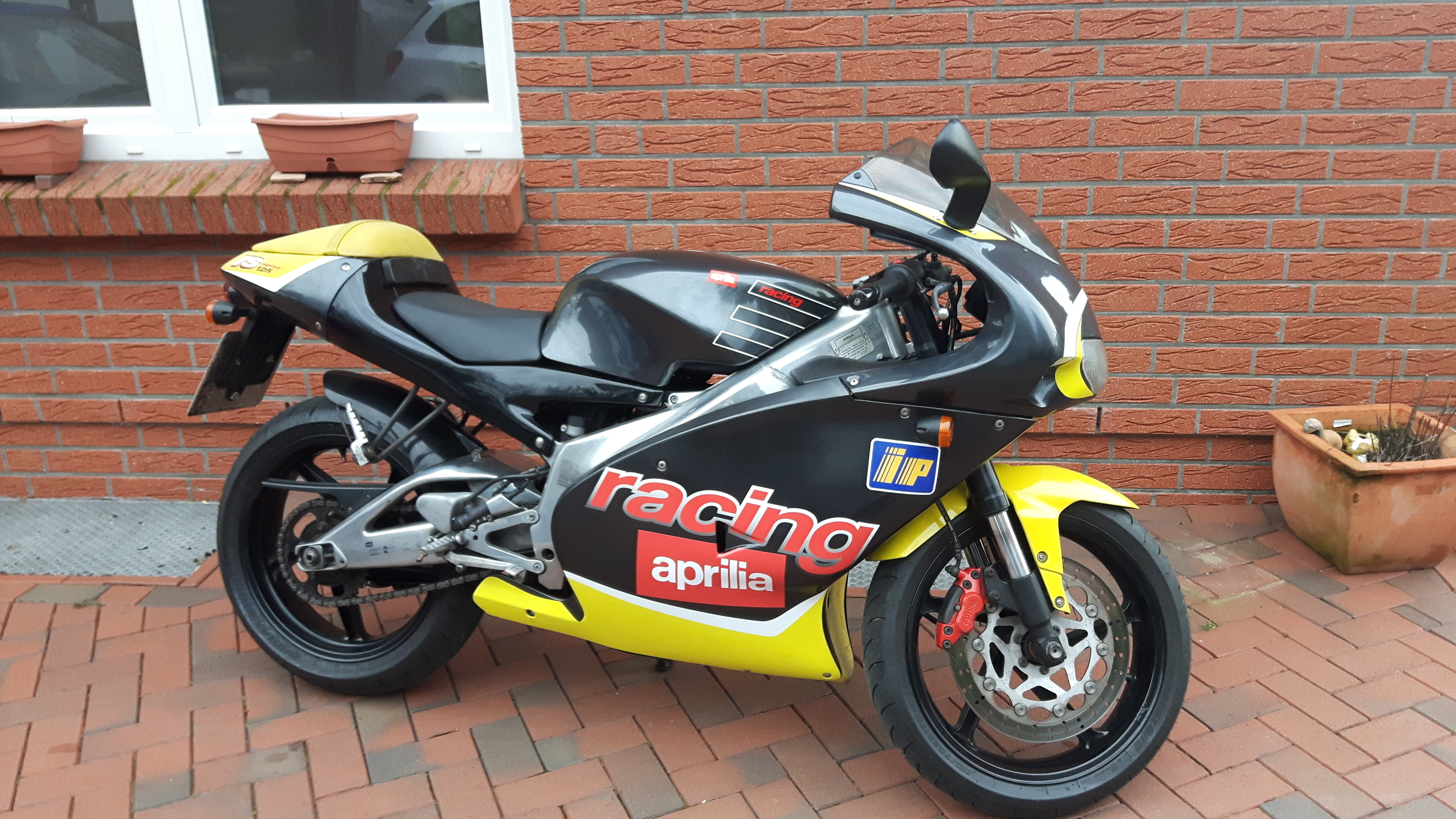
2001 Aprilia RS125

The RS125 was revised again in 1999 with more rounded and bulbous fairings, five spoke rims and a single air duct on the driver's right hand side. The lip on the headlight unit is increased in size.

=== RS125 2006 to 2012 ===
The RS125 was given completely new fairing styling similar to the RSV 1000R. It has angular fairings, two headlight bulbs, a digital gauge, and multispoke Marchesini-styled rims. The bike also has a vacuum fuel tap on the tank.

Aprilia changed to radial four-piston brake calipers and added braided brake lines.

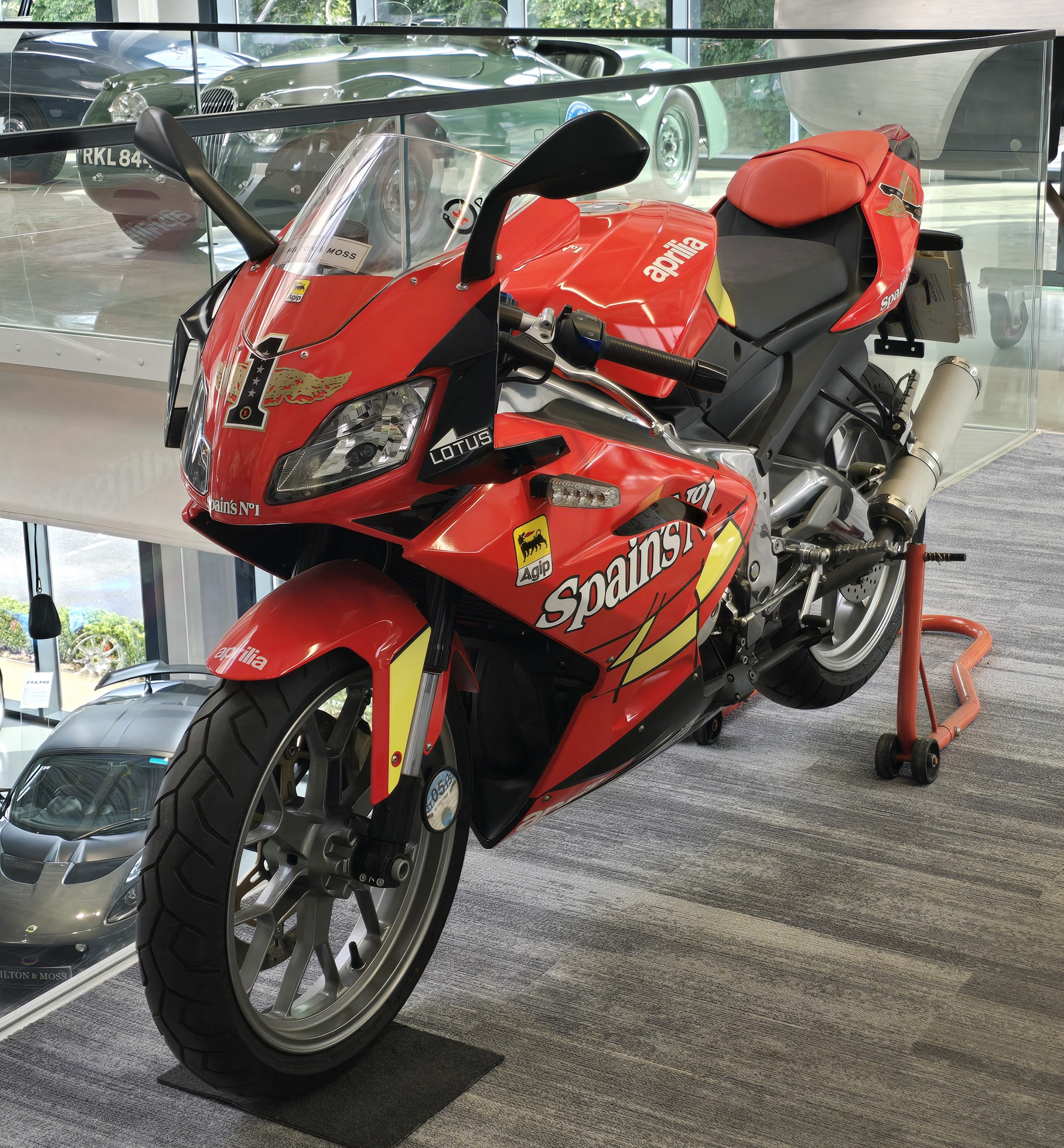
2008 Aprilia RS125 (Fortuna replica)

In 2008, Aprilia changed the electronics from Nippon-Denso to a EFI Technology ECU and introduced the new Dell'Orto 28 mm VHST CD carburetor to meet the more stringent EURO3 emissions standards.

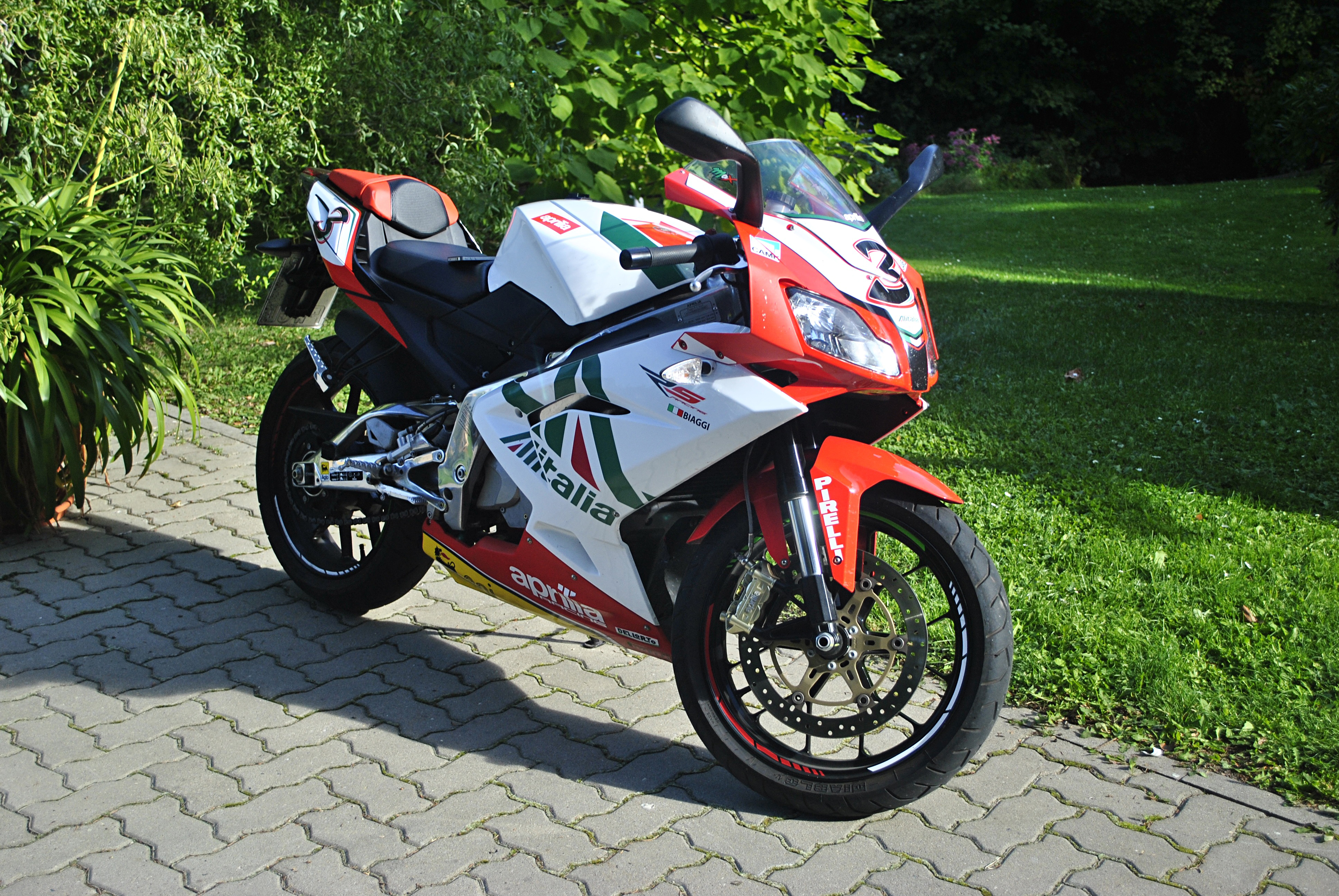
2011 Aprilia RS125 (Alitalia Livery)

The line was dropped in 2012 to make way for the new RS4 125, going from a two-stroke to a single-cylinder four-stroke fuel injected system.

=== RS125 2019 to 2026 ===
For 2019 - in the course of updating the bike to Euro 4 emissions standards - the RS4 125 was renamed RS 125 again, keeping the single cylinder four-stroke engine, and most other components from the RS4 125. The new engine offered improved fuel efficiency, at the cost of severely reduced power and torque, compared to the former two stroke. The four stroke RS 125 has since been updated in 2021 and 2025, mostly to comply to Euro 5 and Euro 5+ regulations. But also updates in design, electronics and a wider rear tyre were implemented.

=== Tuono 2003 to 2004 ===
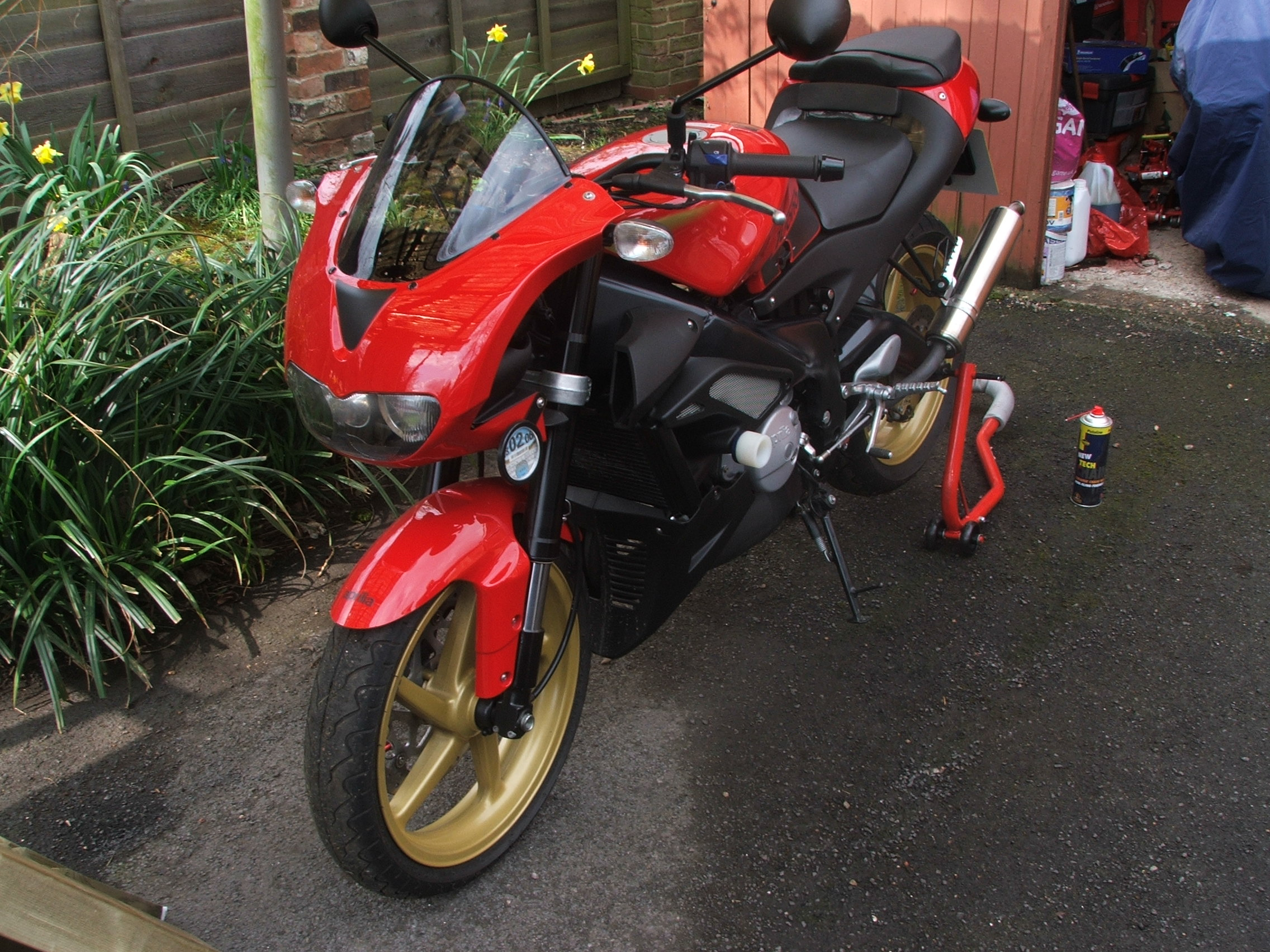
Aprilia Tuono 125

The RS125 Tuono was introduced in 2003 as a semi naked version of the RS125. Production ran until 2004 and was subsequently dropped from the line-up.

The Tuono was essentially an RS125 with the middle and lower portions of the fairings absent and a handlebar fitted on the top yoke.
