= 2000 British motorcycle Grand Prix =

Motorcycle grand prix

(United Kingdom) 2000 British Grand Prix
Race details
- Race 9 of 16 races in the 2000 Grand Prix motorcycle racing season
- Date: 9 July 2000
- Official name: Cinzano British Grand Prix
- Location: Donington Park
- Course: Permanent racing facility; 4.023 km (2.500 mi)

500cc
Pole position
- Rider: (Brazil) Alex Barros
- Time: 1:32.316
Fastest lap
- Rider: (Australia) Garry McCoy
- Time: 1:39.895 on lap 27
Podium
- First: (Italy) Valentino Rossi
- Second: (United States) Kenny Roberts Jr.
- Third: (United Kingdom) Jeremy McWilliams

250cc
Pole position
- Rider: (France) Olivier Jacque
- Time: 1:34.181
Fastest lap
- Rider: (United Kingdom) Jamie Robinson
- Time: 1:39.886 on lap 10
Podium
- First: (Germany) Ralf Waldmann
- Second: (France) Olivier Jacque
- Third: (Japan) Naoki Matsudo

125cc
Pole position
- Rider: (Japan) Youichi Ui
- Time: 1:38.413
Fastest lap
- Rider: (Japan) Masao Azuma
- Time: 1:39.077 on lap 25
Podium
- First: (Japan) Youichi Ui
- Second: (Spain) Emilio Alzamora
- Third: (Japan) Noboru Ueda

The 2000 British motorcycle Grand Prix was the ninth round of the 2000 Grand Prix motorcycle racing season. It took place on 9 July 2000 at Donington Park.

Ralf Waldmann's final win in the 250 cc classification is of particular note. On a drying track, he came from nearly a whole lap down to win at the final corner at the notoriously slippery Donington Park circuit.

== 500cc race report ==
This race was most notable for the three-way battle for victory between Valentino Rossi, Kenny Roberts Jr. and Jeremy McWilliams, as well as Rossi's first victory in the premier class, coming back from a poor start to win the race.

Kenny Roberts Jr. is leading the hunt for the 2000 crown with 125 points, followed by Carlos Checa with 111 and Norick Abe with 91 points.

On Saturday, Alex Barros had grabbed pole position - his third of the year and a strong showing after winning last time out in the Netherlands. Behind him was championship leader Kenny Roberts Jr. in second, Garry McCoy in third and rookie Valentino Rossi in fourth. The second row of the grid consisted out of Max Biaggi, Carlos Checa, Norick Abe and last year's champion Àlex Crivillé in fifth, sixth, seventh and eighth places. Aprilia rider Jeremy McWilliams started way down in fifteenth place, failing to improve his time after he broke two bones in his foot after crashing during free practice on Friday.

Before the start of the race, a one-minute's silence was held as a tribute to Joey Dunlop, who had died in a freak accident in Tallinn, Estonia while leading a 125cc race only seven days earlier.

During the 250cc race, it had rained which left the circuit wet. As a result, every rider had opted to pick the Rain tyre for the race.

All riders take off and do their usual warm-up lap before lining up in their respective grid slots. As the lights go out, Rossi has a bad start when his rear tyre slides, lacking grip because of the wet track on the opening lap. As he loses positions, Frenchman Régis Laconi takes the lead going into Redgate (Turn 1), followed by Barros and Gibernau - who made up eleven positions to catapult himself into third by the time the group arrived at the Old Hairpin (Turn 4). Both Rossi and Biaggi had dropped down the order significantly, with Rossi being in thirteenth and Biaggi in fifteenth spot halfway around lap 1. McWilliams meanwhile managed to make good use of the chaos and passed eight people to position himself in seventh. At the short straight before Coppice (Turn 8), McWilliams also passes Nobuatsu Aoki for sixth, then passes Roberts before exiting the corner to move himself up into fifth place. Rossi behind has managed to pass Jurgen van den Goorbergh and is now battling José Luis Cardoso for eleventh at Starkey's Straight. At the front, Abe is trying to pass Gibernau around the outside of the entrance at The Esses (Turn 9), but goes a bit wide when he doesn't manage to break properly because of the wet circuit and slots back behind the Spaniard.

As lap two begins, the top six is as follows: Laconi, Barros, Gibernau, Abe, McWilliams and Roberts Jr. Rossi moved up into tenth after passing Tetsuya Harada's Aprilia and Biaggi slid further down the order, now being behind McCoy in a lowly seventeenth spot. Barros is slowly closing up on Laconi, with Rossi passing Okada at the short straight before Coppice for ninth. At Starkey's Straight, Rossi then goes side by side with Loris Capirossi and passes him at the entrance to The Esses for eighth position. At the front, Barros takes the lead by passing Laconi at the entrance of the Melbourne Hairpin (Turn 10).

Lap three and Rossi is slowly closing the gap to the Telefónica Suzuki of Aoki, as does McWilliams to Abe. Barros meanwhile is opening up a significant gap to Laconi, who is now starting to struggle a little bit. Rossi caught and passed the Japanese at the entrance of Coppice, moving him up into seventh place.

On lap four, Laconi is closing the gap to Barros slightly. No overtakes happened at the front.

Lap five and the top four is bunching up, with McWilliams joining the group. Later on in the lap, Roberts Jr. closes up on McWilliams, with the American overtaking him at the entrance of Goddards (Turn 11) for fifth spot.

Lap six begins and the top six now consists out of Barros, Laconi, Gibernau, Abe, Roberts Jr. and McWilliams, with Rossi closing up fast. Gibernau moves up the inside of Laconi going into The Esses, taking second place from him. As Laconi tries to go side by side with the Spaniard to retake the position going into the Melbourne Hairpin, Abe then bravely dives down the inside of both, making minor contact as the trio bunches up into the hairpin, with Abe taking two positions in one corner and promoting up into second. Roberts Jr. then takes two places by taking both Gibernau for fourth exiting the hairping and Laconi for third at the short straight before Goddards. McWilliams also tries to take Gibernau's fifth place around the outside of the hairpin, touching and making them both lose momentum as they exit the corner.

On lap seven, Rossi makes good use of the chaos in front of him to overtake both McWilliams and Gibernau going into Redgate. However, McWilliams also goes up the inside of Rossi - him also overtaking Gibernau for fifth - taking two positions in one corner. Rossi has a moment exiting the corner but not losing any places because of it. At the entrance of Coppice, McWilliams then takes fourth from Laconi by forcing him to go wide at the entrance of the corner. Coming down into the Melbourne Hairpin, Rossi makes his move and passes Laconi for fifth place by going up his inside, but he runs wide and has to slot back behind the Frenchman as they exit the corner. Right behind the duo, Aoki also overtook Gibernau's Repsol YPF Honda for seventh place at the same hairpin.

Lap eight and Abe lines up a pass at the start/finish straight, but thinks the better of it and stays behind for the time being. Gibernau meanwhile dives down the inside of Aoki and retakes seventh going into Redgate. Rossi then finally makes it stick and passes Laconi at the entrance of Coppice, moving him up to fifth position. Gibernau does the same, going side by side with Laconi at Starkey's Straight and picking off the Red Bull WCM Yahama rider at The Esses, moving up into sixth place.

As lap nine begins, the top three - consisting of Barros, Abe and Roberts Jr. - now have a significant gap back to McWilliams and behind him, Rossi. Aoki managed to pass both Laconi and Gibernau before the beginning of the lap, moving him up into sixth. Way back, Biaggi only managed to move up into fifteenth so far. At the front, McWilliams has closed the gap to the top three and is now in contention for the win. Abe tries to line up a move to take the lead from Barros but in doing so, has left the door open for Roberts Jr. to dive down his inside at Starkey's Straight, taking second from the Japanese instead as they enter The Esses complex.

On lap ten, Roberts Jr. goes up the inside of Barros, easily taking over the lead from him. McWilliams also overtakes Abe for the bottom step of the podium by going up his inside at the Old Hairpin.

Lap eleven and Roberts Jr. is now opening up a significant gap to second place Barros, with McWilliams right behind him. The Northern Irishman then makes a move and takes second from Barros at the Old Hairpin. Rossi then tries to pass Abe at Coppice, but runs wide and loses one place to Aoki as well, demoting him to sixth. Aoki himself then passes Abe at Starkey's Straight, finalising the move going into The Esses and taking fourth place from him.

On lap twelve, a slightly drying groove now starts to become visible. Aoki surprised Barros by taking third when he went around the outside, then the inside at the fast Craner Curves (Turns 2 and 3). Abe also passes the now fading Barros and moves up into fourth place when he went up his inside at Coppice. At the Melbourne Hairpin, Rossi too made his move and took fifth from Barros.

As lap thirteen begins, Rossi immediately is eyeing Abe's fourth position, and makes a successful move on him at Redgate by diving down the inside. At the Craner Curves, Gibernau overtook Barros and moved up to sixth. Laconi has passed Barros as well, with the Brazilian now dropping all the way down to eighth.

Lap fourteen and Rossi is now putting the pressure on Aoki. Making good use of his superior top speed, he goes side by side with the Japanese at Starkey's Straight and takes third before entering The Esses.

On lap fifteen, Barros behind is now coming under pressure from teammate Capirossi. Laconi has passed Gibernau on the previous lap and at the front, Rossi caught and passed McWilliams for second at Starkey's Straight, almost making contact with him entering The Esses as he refuses to hand over the position so easily.

Before the beginning of lap sixteen, Aoki crashes out of a strong fourth place. He had a slight moment, causing him to highside just as he wanted to exit out of the Goddards hairpin, throwing him onto the grass at low speed. He gets up quickly and removes his bike from the dangerous position, but loses a lot of time and continues in last place. At the front, the battle for victory has been reduced to three after the crash of Aoki caused a massive gap to number four Abe, consisting out of Roberts Jr., Rossi and McWilliams.

Lap seventeen and a dry line is now clearly visible as a dry groove has formed. The gap Roberts Jr. has to Rossi is +0.903 seconds, but 'The Doctor' is now catching him quickly as it gets cut and is now only +0.377 seconds when they arrive at The Esses.

On lap eighteen, Rossi is still catching up to the American. Laconi has also crashed at the exit of Goddards, the Frenchman already back onto his bike and ready to ride again as he has not stalled his motorcycle. The gap to Roberts Jr. meanwhile has extended slightly by Rossi - from +0.377 seconds before to +0.101 seconds now - with McWilliams tagging along as well. He surprises Rossi by going up his inside at the beginning of Coppice to move up into second position, also allowing Roberts Jr. some slight breathing room.

Lap nineteen has begun and it is now a threeway battle for the lead. McWilliams is now all over the back of the American, lines up a pass at the Craner Curves and overtakes him at the Old Hairpin, taking over the lead under loud cheering from the British crowd. At Starkey's Straight, he effortlessly overtakes Roberts Jr. and slots in front of him at The Esses.

On lap twenty, Biaggi managed to claw his way back up to ninth after being down in fourteenth at the earlier stages of the race. Rossi is now slowly trying to close down the small gap McWilliams has created.

Lap twenty-one and Rossi and Roberts Jr. have troubles trying to catch McWilliams, as he is now increasing the gap. However, the gap at Starkey's Straight closes up again from +1.224 to +1.056 seconds.

On lap twenty-two, the front is still very much stabilised. In fourth is now Capirossi, who overtook and rode away from Abe by now. However, Capirossi made a mistake going into The Esses, allowing Abe to retake fourth from him in the process.

Lap twenty-three and Rossi and Roberts Jr. are now slowly clawing their way back to McWilliams, who starts to slide a bit due to the tyre problems he starts to have.

On lap twenty-four, McCoy has come into the pits to change his tyres from wets to slicks due to the changing conditions. Coming out of the Coppice corners, Rossi has a moment but doesn't lose any positions from it.

Lap twenty-five and the field bunches up again. At Coppice, both Rossi and Roberts Jr. have moments as they exit the corner, showing that they too are starting to have some real tyre problems.

On lap twenty-six, Rossi is now really closing up on McWilliams, who is really suffering from tyre problems by now. Coming out of Coppice, the Northern Irishman has a moment, allowing Rossi to make a move and go side by side with him at Starkey's Straight. However, he does not pass him, choosing to stay behind him for now.

As lap twentyseven begins, Rossi is still right behind McWilliams, who himself is being chased by Roberts Jr. A big part of the circuit has now dried up, making the riders wobble frequently. Coming up to the Melbourne Hairpin, he finally decides to take the lead by diving down the inside of McWilliams' Aprilia, outbreaking him and finalising the move exiting the corner.

Lap twenty-eight and Roberts Jr. tries to pass McWilliams going into Redgate but misses the speed and almost collides with the rear tyre of the Northern Irishman, forcing him to stay right behind him for now. At the Melbourne Hairpin, Roberts Jr. tries to go down the inside of McWilliams and take second place from him, but he just goes a bit too wide, allowing the Aprilia rider to make the cutback and retake the place exiting the hairpin.

Lap twenty-nine, the penultimate lap, has begun and Rossi has now opened up a slight gap back to McWilliams. He then closes up at the Craner Curves as Rossi slides around the corners, much to the delight of the fans. As they exit Coppice, both Rossi and McWilliams' tyres start to smoke as they put on the power.

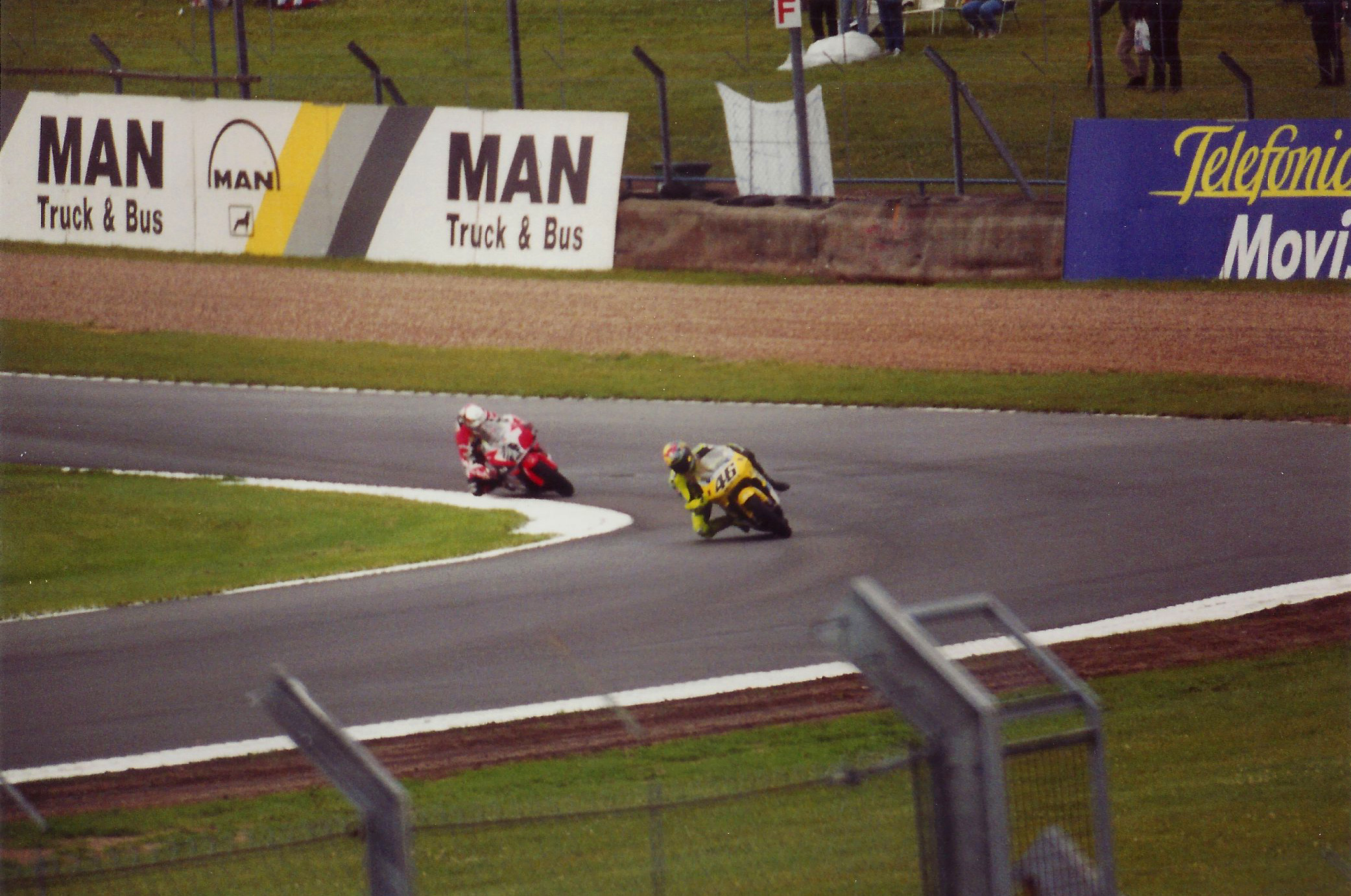
Eventual race winner Valentino Rossi ahead of the Aprilia of Jeremy McWilliams, who went on to finish third in the 500cc race.

The final lap has now arrived - lap thirty - and Rossi is still leading, followed by McWilliams and Roberts Jr. Coming out of Redgate, all the riders are now sliding around as their tyres are practically gone. McWilliams however is still doing his best to close the slight gap to Rossi with Roberts Jr. hot on his tail. Coming out of The Esses, the Suzuki rider got better traction and goes for the move by going side by side with McWilliams before the Melbourne Hairpin, then outbreaking him and snatching second place from him with just one corner to go. Having a big enough gap, Rossi crosses the line to win his first ever 500cc grand prix, followed by Roberts Jr. in second and McWilliams in third. Further back, Capirossi comes home in fourth, Dutchman van den Goorbergh in fifth and Abe in sixth.

On the parade lap back to parc-fermé, Rossi does a burnout as a handful of fans come up to him and congratulate him on his win. He stands on his bike and celebrates in jubilant fashion as well. Roberts Jr. rides up to him and shakes hands with him whilst still onto the bike to congratulate him on his win.

The important figures hand out the trophies, with the audience cheering loudly as McWilliams receives his third-place trophy. The Italian national anthem plays and after it is done, the podium girls put wreaths around the necks of the trio and give them all a kiss on the cheek. Then they hand them the champagne with Rossi then cheekily spraying it on one of the girls, then on the rest of the riders.

When Roberts Jr. was questioned about his tyre choice, he said the following:

"It was a difficult choice until the rain started again, and I'm surprised the tyres held up when the track dried out. I had a lot on mind during the race, like concentrating on not falling down, and keeping an edge to my tyres just in case the rain restarted, and with this in mind, I let Valentino and Jeremy go mid-race. When Valentino got passed him, I tried to go as well, but had to wait until the last lap. I knew I could get the Aprilia there, because I could hear that the engine wasn't as strong as the V4s."

When McWilliams was asked about his last-lap fight with Roberts Jr., he commented the following:

"I made two mistakes. I think now that perhaps I went too hard mid-race in trying to get away, which finished the tyres, and then I missed a gear on the last lap, and allowed Kenny through. He learnt from his last attempt too, and kept it tight at Melbourne so that I couldn't slide back on the inside. I'm happy to be on the podium though. We didn't think we were going to go anywhere from the fourth row of the grid, and when the rain came down, I was just laughing. We put wets on and couldn't care less - we were going out just to see what we could get as others fell down! This is a better end to a difficult week for Irish motorsports, and this podium is for Joey."

When Rossi was asked how he felt after his win, he responded with the following:

"I am very happy. We were ready to win in dry conditions but, when the rain came, we were very afraid, and would have been happy with a podium. The race was not so much fun, with the rear wheel spinning all the time, but my rhythm was not too bad and I was able to get past Barros and Abe before getting up to the lead. The tyre is now completely finished, and it was not easy even on the straight. it was very hard to beat Jeremy, but I managed to get by two or three laps from the end, and I am very pleased to win."

== 500 cc classification ==
Pos.	No.	Rider	Team	Manufacturer	Laps	Time/Retired	Grid	Points
1	46	(Italy) Valentino Rossi	Nastro Azzurro Honda	Honda	30	52:37.246	4	25
2	2	(United States) Kenny Roberts Jr.	Telefónica Movistar Suzuki	Suzuki	30	+0.395	2	20
3	99	(United Kingdom) Jeremy McWilliams	Blu Aprilia Team	Aprilia	30	+0.944	15	16
4	65	(Italy) Loris Capirossi	Emerson Honda Pons	Honda	30	+23.037	12	13
5	17	(Netherlands) Jurgen van den Goorbergh	Rizla Honda	TSR-Honda	30	+25.574	16	11
6	6	(Japan) Norick Abe	Antena 3 Yamaha d'Antin	Yamaha	30	+27.052	7	10
7	1	(Spain) Àlex Crivillé	Repsol YPF Honda Team	Honda	30	+29.617	8	9
8	5	(Spain) Sete Gibernau	Repsol YPF Honda Team	Honda	30	+30.166	14	8
9	4	(Italy) Max Biaggi	Marlboro Yamaha Team	Yamaha	30	+30.873	5	7
10	8	(Japan) Tadayuki Okada	Repsol YPF Honda Team	Honda	30	+31.584	9	6
11	7	(Spain) Carlos Checa	Marlboro Yamaha Team	Yamaha	30	+38.869	6	5
12	55	(France) Régis Laconi	Red Bull Yamaha WCM	Yamaha	30	+44.057	10	4
13	26	(United Kingdom) John McGuinness	Demon Vimto Honda	Honda	30	+1:03.534	18	3
14	10	(Brazil) Alex Barros	Emerson Honda Pons	Honda	30	+1:13.535	1	2
15	30	(Australia) Anthony Gobert	Proton Team KR	Modenas KR3	30	+1:15.652	20	1
16	9	(Japan) Nobuatsu Aoki	Telefónica Movistar Suzuki	Suzuki	30	+1:31.057	11	
17	24	(Australia) Garry McCoy	Red Bull Yamaha WCM	Yamaha	29	+1 lap	3	
18	18	(Belgium) Sébastien Le Grelle	Tecmas Honda Elf	Honda	29	+1 lap	21	
Ret	31	(Japan) Tetsuya Harada	Blu Aprilia Team	Aprilia	12	Retirement	13	
Ret	25	(Spain) José Luis Cardoso	Maxon Dee Cee Jeans	Honda	10	Retirement	17	
Ret	20	(United Kingdom) Phil Giles	Sabre Sport	Honda	1	Retirement	19	
WD	15	(Japan) Yoshiteru Konishi	FCC TSR	TSR-Honda		Withdrew		

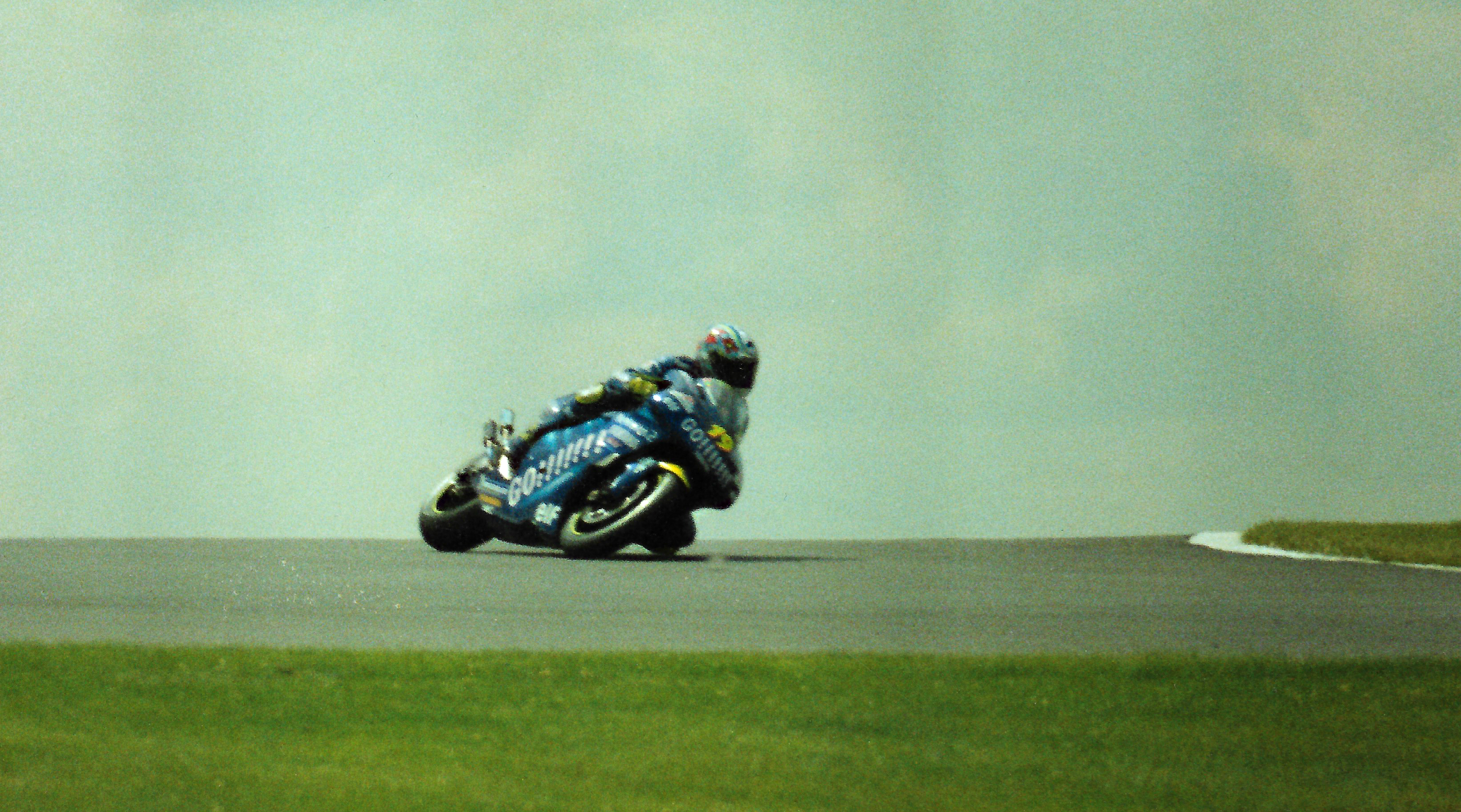
Frenchman Olivier Jacque riding his Yamaha in the 250cc race. He narrowly missed out on the victory against the German Ralf Waldmann.

== 250 cc classification ==
Pos.	No.	Rider	Manufacturer	Laps	Time/Retired	Grid	Points
1	6	(Germany) Ralf Waldmann	Aprilia	27	49:41.073	6	25
2	19	(France) Olivier Jacque	Yamaha	27	+0.344	1	20
3	8	(Japan) Naoki Matsudo	Yamaha	27	+1.609	15	16
4	4	(Japan) Tohru Ukawa	Honda	27	+6.909	3	13
5	24	(United Kingdom) Jason Vincent	Aprilia	27	+22.714	9	11
6	30	(Spain) Alex Debón	Aprilia	27	+43.663	18	10
7	56	(Japan) Shinya Nakano	Yamaha	27	+47.345	2	9
8	16	(Sweden) Johan Stigefelt	TSR-Honda	27	+1:12.409	16	8
9	42	(Spain) David Checa	TSR-Honda	27	+1:13.408	19	7
10	74	(Japan) Daijiro Kato	Honda	27	+1:23.370	5	6
11	9	(Argentina) Sebastián Porto	Yamaha	27	+1:37.181	11	5
12	31	(Spain) Lucas Oliver	Yamaha	27	+1:54.363	27	4
13	71	(United Kingdom) Gary Haslam	Honda	27	+1:54.697	29	3
14	25	(France) Vincent Philippe	TSR-Honda	27	+2:00.208	23	2
15	23	(France) Julien Allemand	Yamaha	26	+1 lap	26	1
16	26	(Germany) Klaus Nöhles	Aprilia	26	+1 lap	10	
17	41	(Netherlands) Jarno Janssen	TSR-Honda	26	+1 lap	20	
18	10	(Spain) Fonsi Nieto	Yamaha	26	+1 lap	14	
19	73	(United Kingdom) Jason Davis	Honda	26	+1 lap	28	
Ret	14	(Australia) Anthony West	Honda	22	Accident	7	
Ret	21	(Italy) Franco Battaini	Aprilia	18	Accident	12	
Ret	33	(Spain) David Tomás	Honda	17	Retirement	30	
Ret	77	(United Kingdom) Jamie Robinson	Aprilia	15	Accident	8	
Ret	72	(United Kingdom) Lee Jackson	Honda	15	Accident	31	
Ret	70	(United Kingdom) Tom Tunstall	Honda	15	Retirement	32	
Ret	37	(Italy) Luca Boscoscuro	Aprilia	12	Accident	22	
Ret	15	(United Kingdom) Adrian Coates	Aprilia	12	Accident	24	
Ret	18	(Malaysia) Shahrol Yuzy	Yamaha	9	Accident	21	
Ret	44	(Italy) Roberto Rolfo	Aprilia	8	Retirement	13	
Ret	11	(Italy) Ivan Clementi	Aprilia	5	Retirement	25	
Ret	13	(Italy) Marco Melandri	Aprilia	1	Accident	4	
Ret	22	(France) Sébastien Gimbert	TSR-Honda	1	Retirement	17	

== 125 cc classification ==
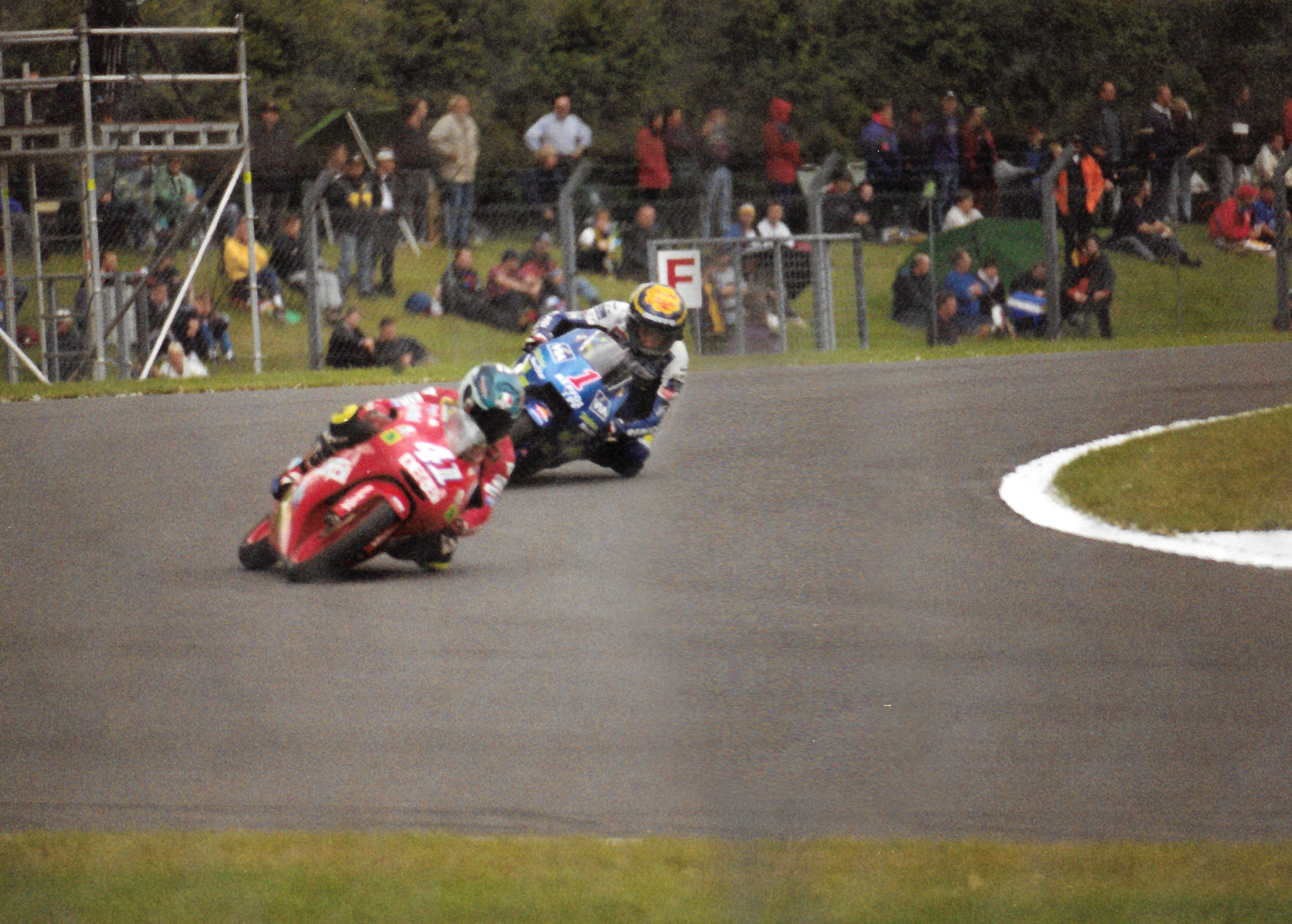
Youichi Ui and Emilio Alzamora, battling for the lead in the 125cc race. Ui won and Alzamora finished second.

Pos.	No.	Rider	Manufacturer	Laps	Time/Retired	Grid	Points
1	41	(Japan) Youichi Ui	Derbi	26	43:28.374	1	25
2	1	(Spain) Emilio Alzamora	Honda	26	+0.752	4	20
3	5	(Japan) Noboru Ueda	Honda	26	+3.104	2	16
4	4	(Italy) Roberto Locatelli	Aprilia	26	+4.181	6	13
5	3	(Japan) Masao Azuma	Honda	26	+4.358	12	11
6	32	(Italy) Mirko Giansanti	Honda	26	+14.117	7	10
7	9	(Italy) Lucio Cecchinello	Honda	26	+14.609	3	9
8	39	(Czech Republic) Jaroslav Huleš	Italjet	26	+28.730	8	8
9	29	(Spain) Ángel Nieto Jr.	Honda	26	+35.300	11	7
10	12	(France) Randy de Puniet	Aprilia	26	+38.275	14	6
11	8	(Italy) Gianluigi Scalvini	Aprilia	26	+38.957	10	5
12	15	(San Marino) Alex de Angelis	Honda	26	+43.184	20	4
13	21	(France) Arnaud Vincent	Aprilia	26	+49.993	18	3
14	18	(Spain) Antonio Elías	Honda	26	+1:00.467	17	2
15	22	(Spain) Pablo Nieto	Derbi	26	+1:06.862	19	1
16	11	(Italy) Max Sabbatani	Honda	26	+1:07.560	15	
17	51	(Italy) Marco Petrini	Aprilia	26	+1:10.485	22	
18	17	(Germany) Steve Jenkner	Honda	26	+1:13.586	21	
19	24	(United Kingdom) Leon Haslam	Italjet	26	+1:23.679	24	
20	73	(United Kingdom) Stuart Easton	Honda	26	+1:46.031	26	
21	34	(Andorra) Eric Bataille	Honda	26	+1:52.377	27	
22	53	(San Marino) William de Angelis	Aprilia	26	+1:59.279	23	
23	71	(United Kingdom) Paul Robinson	Honda	26	+2:15.991	28	
Ret	16	(Italy) Simone Sanna	Aprilia	17	Retirement	13	
Ret	72	(United Kingdom) Kenny Tibble	Honda	14	Retirement	25	
Ret	26	(Italy) Ivan Goi	Honda	8	Retirement	9	
Ret	23	(Italy) Gino Borsoi	Aprilia	8	Retirement	5	
Ret	54	(San Marino) Manuel Poggiali	Derbi	8	Retirement	16	
DNS	10	(Spain) Adrián Araujo	Honda		Did not start		
WD	35	(Germany) Reinhard Stolz	Honda		Withdrew		

== Championship standings after the race (500cc) ==
Below are the standings for the top five riders and constructors after round nine has concluded.

Riders' Championship standings

Pos.	Rider	Points
1	(United States) Kenny Roberts Jr.	145
2	(Spain) Carlos Checa	116
3	(Italy) Loris Capirossi	102
4	(Japan) Norifumi Abe	101
5	(Italy) Valentino Rossi	92

Constructors' Championship standings

Pos.	Constructor	Points
1	(Japan) Honda	174
2	(Japan) Yamaha	173
3	(Japan) Suzuki	151
4	(Italy) Aprilia	68
5	(Japan) TSR-Honda	56

- Note: Only the top five positions are included for both sets of standings.

Previous race: 2000 Dutch TT	FIM Grand Prix World Championship; 2000 season	Next race: 2000 German Grand Prix
Previous race: 1999 British Grand Prix	British Grand Prix	Next race: 2001 British Grand Prix
