= Marco Simoncelli =

Italian motorcycle racer (1987–2011)

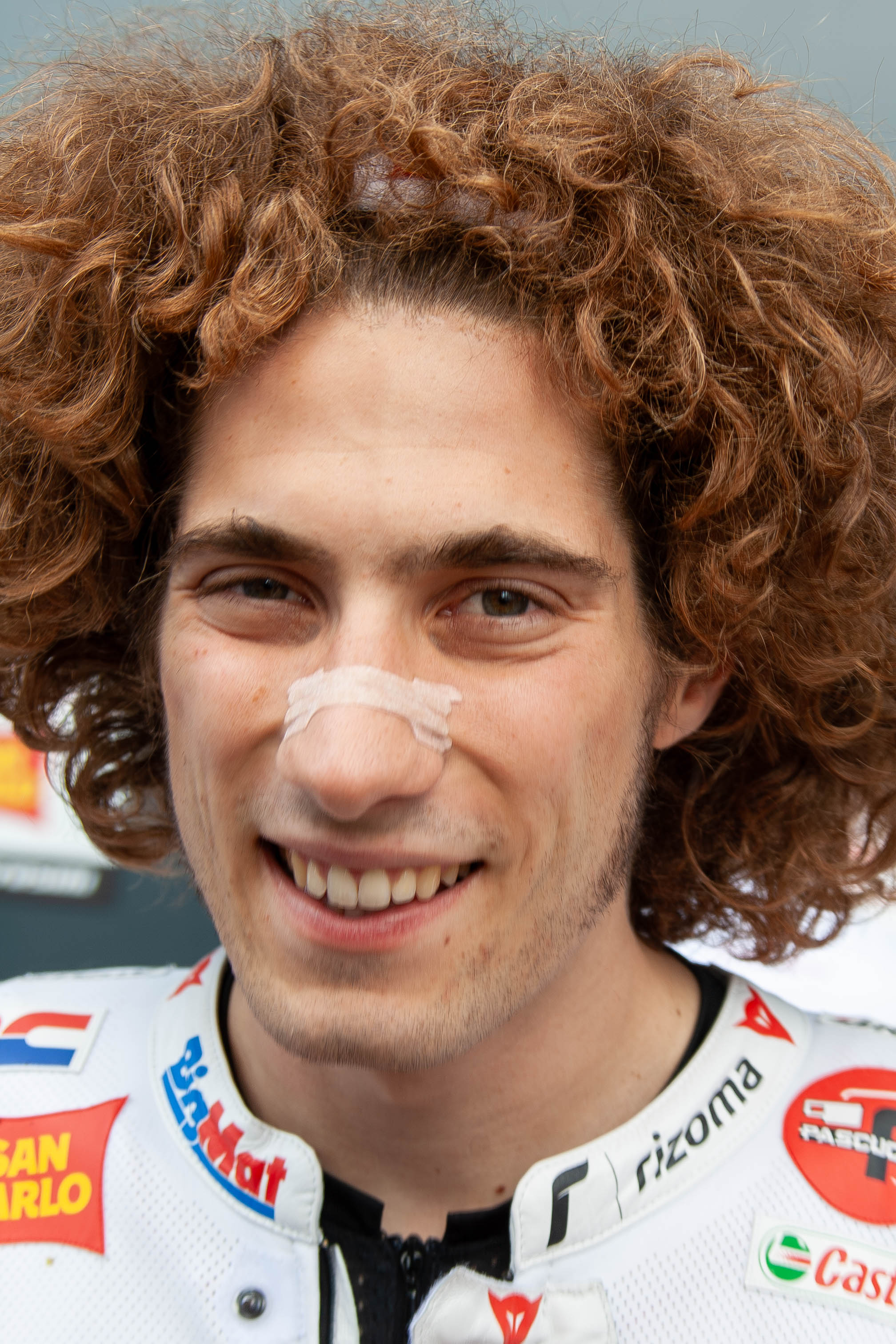
- Simoncelli in 2011
- Nationality: Italian
- Born: 20 January 1987; Cattolica, Italy
- Died: 23 October 2011 (aged 24); Sepang, Selangor, Malaysia
- Bike number: 58 (retired in honour)
- Website: 58marcosimoncelli.it marcosimoncellifondazione.it
Motorcycle racing career statistics
MotoGP World Championship
Active years	2010–2011
Manufacturers	Honda
Championships	0
2011 championship position	6th (139 pts)
Starts / Wins / Podiums / Poles / F. laps / Points; 34 / 0 / 2 / 2 / 0 / 264
250cc World Championship
Active years	2006–2009
Manufacturers	Gilera
Championships	1 (2008)
2009 championship position	3rd (231 pts)
Starts / Wins / Podiums / Poles / F. laps / Points; 64 / 12 / 22 / 10 / 8 / 701
125cc World Championship
Active years	2002–2005
Manufacturers	Aprilia
Championships	0
2005 championship position	5th (177 pts)
Starts / Wins / Podiums / Poles / F. laps / Points; 50 / 2 / 7 / 3 / 1 / 290
Superbike World Championship
Active years	2009
Manufacturers	Aprilia
Championships	0
2009 championship position	25th (16 pts)
Starts / Wins / Podiums / Poles / F. laps / Points; 2 / 0 / 1 / 0 / 0 / 16

Marco Simoncelli (Italian pronunciation: [ˈmarko simonˈtʃɛlli]; 20 January 1987 – 23 October 2011), nicknamed Sic (Italian: [ˈsitʃ]), was an Italian professional motorcycle racer who competed in the MotoGP World Championship from 2002 to 2011. He started in the 125cc class before moving up to the 250cc class in 2006. He won the 2008 250cc World Championship with Gilera. After four years in the intermediate class, he stepped up to the top MotoGP class in 2010, racing with the Honda Gresini Team. He died in an accident at the 2011 Malaysian Grand Prix at Sepang.

== Career ==
=== Early career ===
Simoncelli was born in Cattolica but grew up and lived in Coriano with his family since childhood. He started racing minibikes at the age of seven in his hometown of Coriano, moving on to the Italian Minimoto Championship in 1996 at the early age of nine. He won the Italian Minimoto Championship in 1999 and 2000 while also became the runner-up in the 2000 European Minimoto Championship. The following year, he stepped up to the Italian 125cc Championship and he won the title in his rookie year. In 2002, he competed and won the European 125cc Championship.

=== 125cc World Championship ===
After a successful European 125cc campaign, in August 2002, Simoncelli made his first Grand Prix appearance with Matteoni Racing, replacing Czech rider Jaroslav Huleš who stepped up to the 250cc class. Simoncelli, riding an Aprilia bike with the number 37, managed to finish in 27th place in his first race at Brno. In the following race at Estoril, he scored his first championship points by finishing in 13th place. However, he failed to score any points in the next four races and finished the season with three points from six races.

Simoncelli continued with the Matteoni Racing Team for his first full season in 2003. That season, he also started to use the iconic number 58 on his bike. He managed to score points in six races with a best result of fourth at Valencia, the last race of the season. Overall, he scored 31 points and ranked 21st in the final championship standings.

In the 2004 season, Simoncelli switched to WorldwideRace team under the name of Rauch Bravo, which also run an Aprilia bike. In the second race of the season at Jerez, Simoncelli recorded his first pole position. In the race, which was held in wet conditions, Simoncelli was in second place when race leader Casey Stoner crashed out with three laps remaining, handing Simoncelli his first victory. However, the victory was his only podium finish for the season. He managed to score points in seven other races with a best result of sixth. He ended in 11th place in the final standings with 79 points.

Simoncelli continued to ride for WorldwideRace in 2005, this time under the Nocable.it Race banner. In the opening race at Jerez, he qualified first and then won the race for his second successive win at Jerez. Despite failing to add another win that season, Simoncelli finished on the podium on five other occasions. His consistency earned him 177 points and a fifth place in the final standings.

=== 250cc World Championship ===
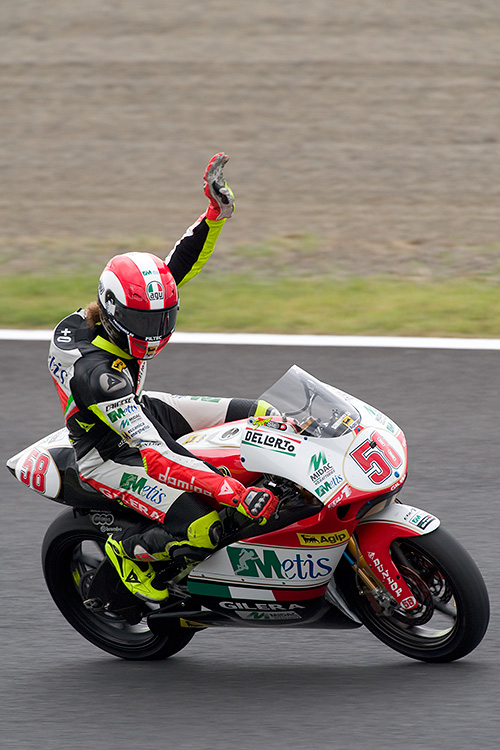
Simoncelli at the 2008 Japanese Grand Prix at Motegi

In 2006, Simoncelli stepped up to the 250cc class, becoming the only rider from the top eight in previous year's 125cc class to make the step up. He joined the Metis Gilera team, an Italian motorcycle manufacturer who returned to the intermediate class after a lengthy absence. His first season saw him end most of the races he finished between seventh and tenth place. His best result was sixth place in the Chinese Grand Prix at Shanghai. He fought for the "Rookie of the Year" title until the end, finally losing to Shuhei Aoyama by seven points, finishing tenth overall.

In 2007, Simoncelli continued with the same team. His season was similar to the previous one and he was again tenth in the final standings, without a podium finish.

Simoncelli had his first 250cc win at the Italian Grand Prix held at Mugello on 1 June 2008 Barberá then crashed into him and Simoncelli won the race by three seconds.

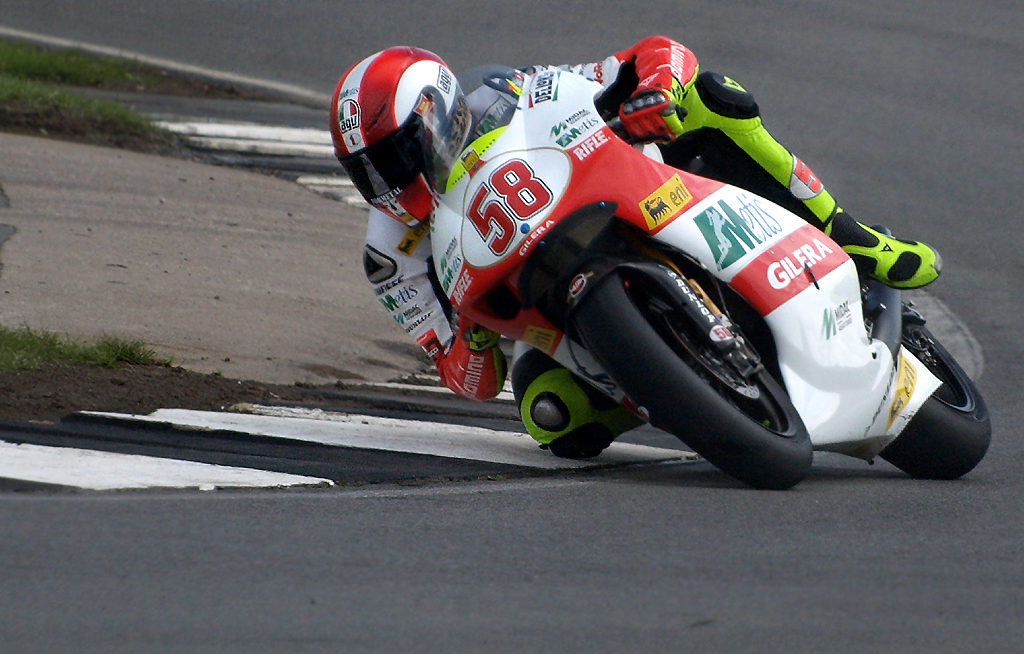
Simoncelli at the 2009 British Grand Prix at Donington Park

On 8 June 2008, Simoncelli followed up his Italian victory at the Catalan Grand Prix after overtaking Álvaro Bautista on the last lap after Bautista ran wide with five corners of the race left. Simoncelli obtained his third 250cc GP victory at the Sachsenring in the German Grand Prix on 13 July 2008 when he beat Bautista and Barberá by approximately 2.5 seconds. He also won in his class at the 2008 Australian motorcycle Grand Prix held on 3–5 October 2008, narrowly defeating Bautista.

On 19 October 2008, Simoncelli won the 2008 250cc World Championship after finishing third in the Malaysian Grand Prix at Sepang.

=== Superbike World Championship ===
Simoncelli made a one-off appearance for Aprilia in the World Superbike round at Imola in 2009. He qualified on the second row and was one of three riders to crash out of race one at Tosa while running fifth, before fighting through to third in race two, making a forceful move to overtake teammate Max Biaggi to get onto the podium.

On 25 June 2009, it was confirmed that Simoncelli would move up to premier class racing for 2010 MotoGP championship after agreeing to ride with the San Carlo Gresini Honda team.

=== MotoGP World Championship ===
==== 2010 ====
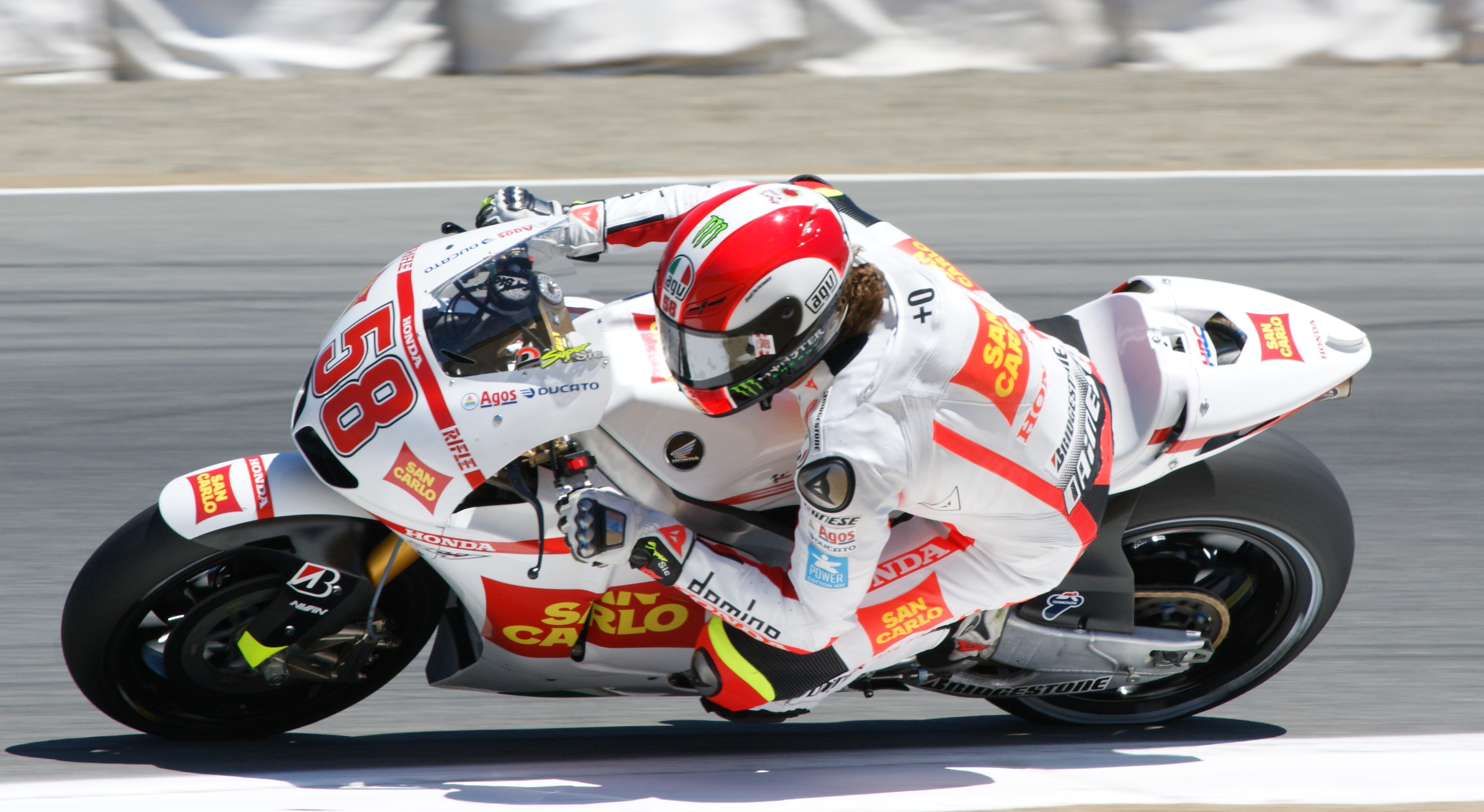
Simoncelli at the 2010 United States Grand Prix at Laguna Seca

Simoncelli got off to a slow start to the 2010 season, having suffered two preseason testing crashes at Sepang; the second of which cracked his helmet. After finishing eleventh on début, Simoncelli improved over the rest of the season, finishing 16 of the 18 races in the points en route to eighth place in the championship with 125 points. His best finish was a fourth place in Portugal, missing a podium by 0.06 seconds to Andrea Dovizioso.

==== 2011 ====
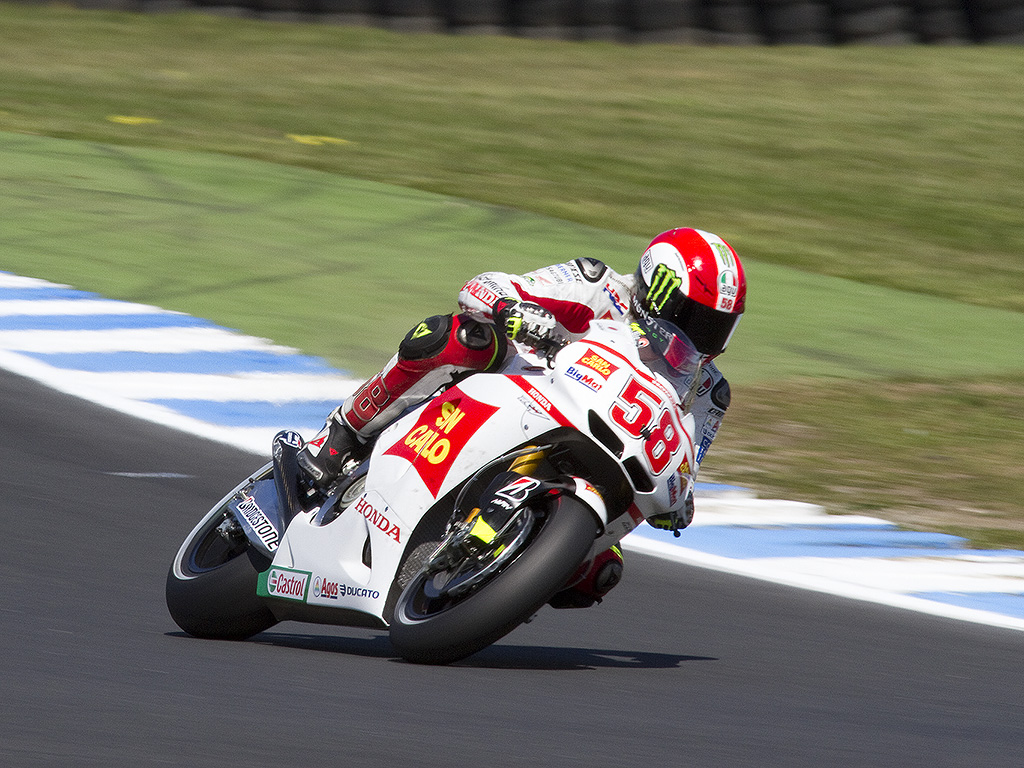
Simoncelli at the 2011 Australian Grand Prix at Phillip Island

In the 2011 season, Simoncelli was promoted to ride a factory Honda as part of the Gresini team, whilst Hiroshi Aoyama rode a satellite Honda for the team. Simoncelli was predicted to be the surprise package of the season. He finished fifth in the season opening race in Qatar, before falling from the lead of the wet race at Jerez. He secured his highest starting position to that point of second, before falling on the first lap of the Estoril race. During the French Grand Prix at Le Mans, Simoncelli collided with Dani Pedrosa while they were battling for second. The resulting crash saw Pedrosa break his collarbone and Simoncelli received a ride-through penalty, eventually finishing fifth. Simoncelli initially rejected blame for the crash, claiming he braked no later than normal, and that he left Pedrosa room. Before the next race, however, he accepted that he needed to reflect on his riding style.

Simoncelli was required to meet with race direction before the start of the racing weekend at Catalonia. On the track, Simoncelli secured his first MotoGP pole position, 0.016 seconds ahead of Casey Stoner. However, a poor start saw him drop to seventh managing only to recover one position to finish sixth. Simoncelli earned his first podium in the premier class, with a third place in the Czech Republic. His best MotoGP finish was second place in the Australian GP at Phillip Island.

== Death ==
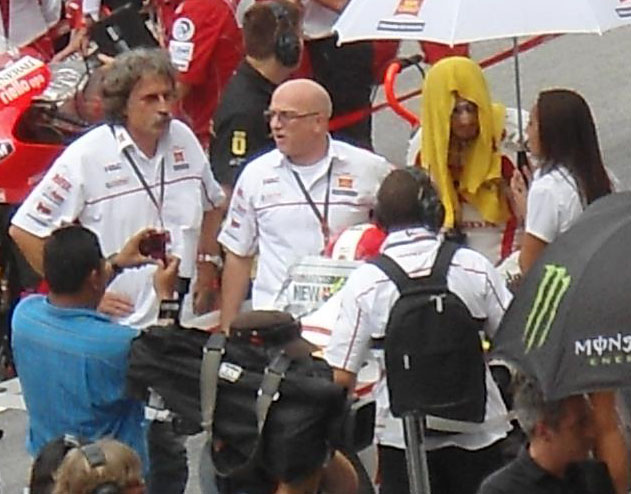
Simoncelli, with a towel on his head, on the grid at the 2011 Malaysian Grand Prix, his incomplete final race

On 23 October 2011, Simoncelli was involved in a collision with American rider Colin Edwards and fellow Italian Valentino Rossi during the Malaysian Grand Prix at the Sepang International Circuit. In fourth position during lap two, Simoncelli's bike lost traction in Turn 11 and it started to slide towards the gravel, but the tires regained traction and his bike suddenly veered across the track into the path of Edwards and Rossi, with Simoncelli hanging down on the right side; Edwards and Rossi were unable to prevent collision.

Simoncelli lost his helmet and Edwards was catapulted from his bike. The race was immediately red-flagged. Edwards suffered a dislocated shoulder. Simoncelli sustained serious trauma to his head, neck and chest, and was taken by ambulance to the circuit's medical center. He was administered CPR for 45 minutes, but at 16:56 local time, less than an hour after the accident, it was announced that he had died from his injuries.

His body was flown home to Italy, accompanied by his father Paolo, his fiancée Kate Fretti, and Valentino Rossi. The family were greeted by Italian Olympic Committee president Giovanni Petrucci, before the body was transported to a theatre in Coriano, Rimini, where it was placed in an open coffin. Fans and visitors were then allowed to pay their respects, in a walk-through memorial that included his 250cc World Championship winning Gilera, plus his 2011 MotoGP Honda. An estimated 20,000 people attended his funeral at the Santa Maria Assunta parish church in Coriano on 27 October 2011, which was broadcast live on Italia 1 and Rai 2.

=== Legacy ===
Valentino Rossi was so devastated by the loss of his close friend and his role in it that it became the trigger that caused the creation of Rossi's racing Academy project VR46 to mentor Italian riders. The Rossi academy aims to ensure that his and Simoncelli's intertwined legacies will live on far beyond their racing careers. MotoGP riders Pecco Bagnaia, Franco Morbidelli, Luca Marini and Marco Bezzecchi are VR46 academy graduates. Regarding the creation of the academy, Rossi has said "I always say that Marco was the first rider of the Academy, even if the Academy didn't exist."

On 3 November 2011, the Misano World Circuit announced plans to rename itself in honour of Simoncelli, and it did so the following year. At the final Grand Prix of the 2011 season in Valencia, Spain, a tribute lap on race morning was held in honour of Simoncelli, with riders from all three Grand Prix classes taking part along with 1993 500cc World Champion Kevin Schwantz, who rode Simoncelli's bike.

Tributes were made in Formula One with Sebastian Vettel dedicating his victory in the 2011 Indian Grand Prix to Simoncelli and IndyCar Series driver Dan Wheldon, who died at the Las Vegas Motor Speedway, the weekend before, during the 2011 IZOD IndyCar World Championship. A minute's silence was held at the Grand Prix in memory of Wheldon and Simoncelli. At the 2012 Malaysian Grand Prix, Ferrari drivers Felipe Massa and Fernando Alonso, along with other members of the team paid tribute to Simoncelli by returning to turn 11 and having a group photo with a banner in remembrance.

On the same day of the accident, all Serie A football matches in Italy held one minute of silence in remembrance of Simoncelli as instructed by the president of the Italian Olympic Committee, Petrucci.

On 20 January 2012, the anniversary of Simoncelli's birth, it was announced at a ceremony in his home town Coriano that the town's sports area would be renamed "Palazzetto dello Sport Marco Simoncelli", and that one of the town's bus routes would be re-numbered 58 in his honour.

In 2013, his father Paolo Simoncelli announced the formation of Sic58 Squadra Corse in honor of Marco. The team was created to help young Italian riders develop in the lower levels of Grand Prix racing. The team originally raced in Italian Moto3 series before moving up to the FIM CEV Moto3 Junior World Championship in 2015 and later into the FIM Moto3 World Championship in 2017.

On Thursday 12 September 2013 in Coriano, a tribute took place for Marco Simoncelli with a flame and a monument for Marco Simoncelli called "Every Sunday" and every Sunday at nightfall the flame will burn for 58 seconds.

On 23 October 2013, AC Milan paid a tribute to Simoncelli by posting on their Google+ profile, a photo of their jersey in their dressing room with Simoncelli's name on the back.

On 3 February 2014, it was announced that Simoncelli would be posthumously inducted into the MotoGP Hall of Fame and become the 21st MotoGP Legend. The ceremony took place at the Italian round in Mugello.

On 8 September 2016, it was announced that Simoncelli's racing number 58 would be retired from all classes of Grand Prix racing competition. It was the third number to be retired from all classes of Grand Prix racing competition, after Kevin Schwantz's #34 (Schwantz's number was used by Andrea Dovizioso until he moved up to MotoGP, and was last used by Esteve Rabat during his Moto2 debut season in 2011) and Daijiro Kato's #74 (Kato's number remains available for wildcard entries in the 125cc/Moto3 class, albeit since the 2013 season no one has used the number again). CEO of Dorna Carmelo Ezpeleta led a ceremony of remembrance ahead of the Misano GP 2016 race weekend stating: "Today we say to Marco's father, Paolo, that from now this number belongs to the Simoncelli family. Nobody will use it, unless they decide somebody can use this number." The number 58 eventually made its return to the grid as rookie Luca Lunetta made his Moto3 debut at Mugello in 2023, and subsequently wore the number for two full seasons as he rode for Sic58 Squadra Corse.

== Career statistics ==
=== CIV 125cc Championship ===
==== Races by year ====
(key) (Races in bold indicate pole position; races in italics indicate fastest lap)

Year	Bike	1	2	3	4	5	Pos	Pts
2001	Honda	MIS1; 17	MON; Ret	VAL; 13	MIS2; 8	MIS3; 4	9th	25

=== Grand Prix motorcycle racing ===
==== By season ====
Season	Class	Motorcycle	Team	Number	Race	Win	Podium	Pole	FLap	Pts	Plcd	WCh
2002	125cc	Aprilia RS 125	Matteoni Racing Team	37	6	0	0	0	0	3	33rd	–
2003	125cc	Aprilia RS 125	Matteoni Racing Team	58	15	0	0	0	0	31	21st	–
2004	125cc	Aprilia RS 125	Rauch Bravo	58	13	1	1	2	0	79	11th	–
2005	125cc	Aprilia RS 125	Nocable.it Race	58	16	1	6	1	1	177	5th	–
2006	250cc	Gilera RSA 250	Metis Gilera	58	16	0	0	0	0	92	10th	–
2007	250cc	Gilera RSA 250	Metis Gilera	58	17	0	0	0	0	97	10th	–
2008	250cc	Gilera RSA 250	Metis Gilera	58	16	6	12	7	4	281	**1st**	1
2009	250cc	Gilera RSA 250	Metis Gilera	58	15	6	10	3	4	231	**3rd**	–
2010	MotoGP	Honda RC212V	San Carlo Honda Gresini	58	18	0	0	0	0	125	8th	–
2011	MotoGP	Honda RC212V	San Carlo Honda Gresini	58	16	0	2	2	0	139	6th	–
Total					**148**	**14**	**31**	**15**	**9**	**1255**		**1**

==== Races by year ====
(key) (Races in bold indicate pole position, races in italics indicate fastest lap)

Year	Class	Bike	1	2	3	4	5	6	7	8	9	10	11	12	13	14	15	16	17	18	Pos	Pts
2002	125cc	Aprilia	JPN	RSA	SPA	FRA	ITA	CAT	NED	GBR	GER	CZE; 27	POR; 13	BRA; 21	PAC	MAL; Ret	AUS; Ret	VAL; Ret			33rd	3
2003	125cc	Aprilia	JPN; 21	RSA; 20	SPA; 14	FRA; Ret	ITA; 17	CAT; 16	NED; 20	GBR; 16	GER; 12	CZE; 14	POR; Ret	BRA; 11	PAC; Ret	MAL; 11	AUS; Ret	VAL; 4			21st	31
2004	125cc	Aprilia	RSA; Ret	**SPA**; 1	FRA; Ret	ITA; Ret	CAT; 7	NED; 7	BRA; 6	GER; 10	GBR; Ret	**CZE**; 19	POR; 6	JPN; 6	QAT; Ret	MAL; Ret	AUS	VAL			11th	79
2005	125cc	Aprilia	**SPA**; 1	POR; 10	CHN; 6	FRA; 5	ITA; Ret	CAT; 2	NED; 4	GBR; 4	GER; 3	CZE; 3	JPN; Ret	MAL; 9	QAT; 3	AUS; 3	TUR; 6	VAL; 5			5th	177
2006	250cc	Gilera	SPA; Ret	QAT; 8	TUR; 11	CHN; 6	FRA; 8	ITA; 7	CAT; Ret	NED; 7	GBR; 10	GER; Ret	CZE; 9	MAL; 8	AUS; 10	JPN; 9	POR; 7	VAL; Ret			10th	92
2007	250cc	Gilera	QAT; 9	SPA; Ret	TUR; 9	CHN; Ret	FRA; 6	ITA; 9	CAT; 9	GBR; Ret	NED; 6	GER; 7	CZE; Ret	RSM; Ret	POR; 7	JPN; 7	AUS; 7	MAL; 8	VAL; 11		10th	97
2008	250cc	Gilera	QAT; Ret	SPA; Ret	**POR**; 2	CHN; 4	FRA; 2	ITA; 1	CAT; 1	GBR; 2	NED; 3	**GER**; 1	**CZE**; 3	RSM; 6	**INP**; C	**JPN**; 1	**AUS**; 1	MAL; 3	**VAL**; 1		**1st**	**281**
2009	250cc	Gilera	QAT	**JPN**; 17	SPA; 3	FRA; 1	ITA; 2	CAT; Ret	NED; 3	**GER**; 1	GBR; 4	**CZE**; 1	INP; 1	RSM; Ret	POR; 1	AUS; 1	MAL; 3	VAL; Ret			**3rd**	**231**
2010	MotoGP	Honda	QAT; 11	SPA; 11	FRA; 10	ITA; 9	GBR; 7	NED; 9	CAT; Ret	GER; 6	USA; Ret	CZE; 11	INP; 7	RSM; 14	ARA; 7	JPN; 6	MAL; 8	AUS; 6	POR; 4	VAL; 6	8th	125
2011	MotoGP	Honda	QAT; 5	SPA; Ret	POR; Ret	FRA; 5	**CAT**; 6	GBR; Ret	**NED**; 9	ITA; 5	GER; 6	USA; Ret	CZE; 3	INP; 12	RSM; 4	ARA; 4	JPN; 4	AUS; 2	MAL; C	VAL	6th	139

=== Superbike World Championship ===
==== Races by year ====
(key) (Races in bold indicate pole position, races in italics indicate fastest lap)

Year	Bike	1		2		3		4		5		6		7		8		9		10		11		12		13		14		Pos	Pts
Year	Bike	R1	R2	R1	R2	R1	R2	R1	R2	R1	R2	R1	R2	R1	R2	R1	R2	R1	R2	R1	R2	R1	R2	R1	R2	R1	R2	R1	R2	Pos	Pts
2009	Aprilia	AUS	AUS	QAT	QAT	SPA	SPA	NED	NED	ITA	ITA	RSA	RSA	USA	USA	SMR	SMR	GBR	GBR	CZE	CZE	GER	GER	ITA; Ret	ITA; 3	FRA	FRA	POR	POR	25th	16

== Bibliography ==
- Simoncelli, Marco; Beltramo, Paolo (2009). Diobò che bello! (in Italian). Mondadori. ISBN 978-88-04-59241-9.
- Simoncelli, Paolo; Simoncelli, Rossella (1 October 2013). Our Marco: The Official Biography of Marco Simoncelli. Haynes Publishing. ISBN 978-0857333551.
