= 2024 San Marino and Rimini Riviera motorcycle Grand Prix =

Motorcycle races in Misano Adriatico

2024 San Marino and Rimini Riviera Grand Prix
Race details
- Race 13 of 20 races in the 2024 Grand Prix motorcycle racing season
- Date: 8 September 2024
- Official name: Gran Premio Red Bull di San Marino e della Riviera di Rimini
- Location: Misano World Circuit Marco Simoncelli; Misano Adriatico, Province of Rimini, Italy
- Course: Permanent racing facility; 4.226 km (2.626 mi)

MotoGP
Pole position
Rider	(Italy) Francesco Bagnaia	Ducati
Time	1:30.304	
Fastest lap
Rider	(Spain) Marc Márquez	Ducati
Time	1:31.564 on lap 20	
Podium
First	(Spain) Marc Márquez	Ducati
Second	(Italy) Francesco Bagnaia	Ducati
Third	(Italy) Enea Bastianini	Ducati

Moto2
Pole position
Rider	(Italy) Tony Arbolino	Kalex
Time	1:35.229	
Fastest lap
Rider	(Spain) Alonso López	Boscoscuro
Time	1:36.003 on lap 8	
Podium
First	(Japan) Ai Ogura	Boscoscuro
Second	(Spain) Arón Canet	Kalex
Third	(Italy) Tony Arbolino	Kalex

Moto3
Pole position
Rider	(Colombia) David Alonso	CFMoto
Time	1:40.505	
Fastest lap
Rider	(Spain) Ángel Piqueras	Honda
Time	1:40.856 on lap 7	
Podium
First	(Spain) Ángel Piqueras	Honda
Second	(Spain) Daniel Holgado	Gas Gas
Third	(Spain) Iván Ortolá	KTM

MotoE Race 1
Pole position
Rider	(Italy) Mattia Casadei	Ducati
Time	1:39.856	
Fastest lap
Rider	(Italy) Kevin Zannoni	Ducati
Time	1:40.107 on lap 4	
Podium
First	(Italy) Mattia Casadei	Ducati
Second	(Italy) Alessandro Zaccone	Ducati
Third	(Brazil) Eric Granado	Ducati

MotoE Race 2
Pole position
Rider	(Italy) Mattia Casadei	Ducati
Time	1:39.856	
Fastest lap
Rider	(Italy) Matteo Ferrari	Ducati
Time	1:39.862 on lap 4	
Podium
First	(Spain) Oscar Gutiérrez	Ducati
Second	(Italy) Mattia Casadei	Ducati
Third	(Brazil) Eric Granado	Ducati

The 2024 San Marino and Rimini Riviera motorcycle Grand Prix (officially known as the Gran Premio Red Bull di San Marino e della Riviera di Rimini) was the thirteenth round of the 2024 Grand Prix motorcycle racing season and the eighth and final round of the 2024 MotoE World Championship. All races (except for both MotoE races which were held on 7 September) were held at the Misano World Circuit Marco Simoncelli in Misano Adriatico on 8 September 2024.

The victories in the four classes went to: Jorge Martín in the Sprint and Marc Márquez in the MotoGP race, Ai Ogura in Moto2, Ángel Piqueras in Moto3, and Mattia Casadei and Óscar Gutiérrez in the two MotoE races.

With the fourth place obtained in Race 1, Héctor Garzó mathematically became MotoE World Champion.

For Ángel Piqueras it was his first career victory in the World Championship at the age of 17 years, 9 months and 9 days.

== Practice and qualifying ==
=== MotoE ===
In the two free practice sessions, the fastest rider on track is Alessandro Zaccone in 1'39"925.

In qualifying, the final Pole position of the season, his first of 2024, is taken by Mattia Casadei setting the best time in 1'39"856; here are the results of the top five classified:

Pos	No.	Rider	Team	Time
1	40	(Italy) Mattia Casadei	(Monaco) LCR E-Team	1'39.856
2	51	(Brazil) Eric Granado	(Monaco) LCR E-Team	1'39.923
3	81	(Spain) Jordi Torres	(Spain) Openbank Aspar Team	1'39.954
4	61	(Italy) Alessandro Zaccone	(France) Tech3 E-Racing	1'39.967
5	21	(Italy) Kevin Zannoni	(Spain) Openbank Aspar Team	1'40.019

=== Moto3 ===
In the free practice session, David Alonso sets the fastest time in 1'41"175. In the two pre-qualifying sessions, the Colombian confirms himself as the fastest rider on track in 1'40"184.

In qualifying, David Alonso takes his sixth seasonal Pole in 1'40"505, ahead of Luca Lunetta; here are the results of the top five classified:

Pos	No.	Rider	Team	Time
1	80	(Colombia) David Alonso	(Spain) CFMoto Gaviota Aspar Team	1'40.505
2	58	(Italy) Luca Lunetta	(Italy) SIC58 Squadra Corse	1'40.922
3	48	(Spain) Iván Ortolá	(Spain) MT Helmets - MSi	1'40.940
4	36	(Spain) Ángel Piqueras	(Luxembourg) Leopard Racing	1'40.950
5	95	(Netherlands) Collin Veijer	(Germany) Liqui Moly Husqvarna Intact GP	1'40.959

=== Moto2 ===
In Moto2, in the free practice session the fastest rider on track is Tony Arbolino with a time of 1'35"775. In the two pre-qualifying sessions, the fastest rider on track is Arón Canet who sets the best time in 1'35"185.

In qualifying, Tony Arbolino takes his first Moto2 career Pole in 1'35"229, while Celestino Vietti finishes second; here are the results of the top five classified:

Pos	No.	Rider	Team	Time
1	14	(Italy) Tony Arbolino	(Belgium) Elf Marc VDS Racing Team	1'35.229
2	13	(Italy) Celestino Vietti	(Finland) Red Bull KTM Ajo	1'35.240
3	79	(Japan) Ai Ogura	(Spain) MT Helmets - MSi	1'35.419
4	44	(Spain) Arón Canet	(Italy) Fantic Racing	1'35.466
5	10	(Brazil) Diogo Moreira	(Italy) Italtrans Racing Team	1'35.521

=== MotoGP ===
In the first free practice session, the best time was set by Jorge Martín in 1'31"707. In the pre-qualifying session it was Francesco Bagnaia who was fastest on track, setting the best time in 1'30"685. In the second free practice session it was instead Marco Bezzecchi who is fastest on track in 1'31"237.

In Q1, Álex Márquez and Brad Binder advanced to the next round. In Q2, the Pole went to Francesco Bagnaia ahead of Franco Morbidelli and Marco Bezzecchi, completing an all-Italian front row. Below are the qualifying results:

Pos.	No.	Rider	Team	Time	
Pos.	No.	Rider	Team	Q1	Q2
1	1	(Italy) Francesco Bagnaia	(Italy) Ducati Lenovo Team	Already in Q2	1'30.304
2	21	(Italy) Franco Morbidelli	(Italy) Prima Pramac Racing	Already in Q2	1'30.589
3	72	(Italy) Marco Bezzecchi	(Italy) Pertamina Enduro VR46 Racing	Already in Q2	1'30.609
4	89	(Spain) Jorge Martín	(Italy) Prima Pramac Racing	Already in Q2	1'30.645
5	31	(Spain) Pedro Acosta	(France) Red Bull GASGAS Tech3	Already in Q2	1'30.656
6	33	(South Africa) Brad Binder	(Austria) Red Bull KTM Factory Racing	1'30.908	1'30.748
7	73	(Spain) Álex Márquez	(Italy) Gresini Racing	1'30.903	1'30.878
8	23	(Italy) Enea Bastianini	(Italy) Ducati Lenovo Team	Already in Q2	1'30.900
9	93	(Spain) Marc Márquez	(Italy) Gresini Racing	Already in Q2	1'30.929
10	20	(France) Fabio Quartararo	(Japan) Monster Energy Yamaha MotoGP Team	Already in Q2	1'31.054
11	12	(Spain) Maverick Viñales	(Italy) Aprilia Racing	Already in Q2	1'31.155
12	43	(Australia) Jack Miller	(Austria) Red Bull KTM Factory Racing	Already in Q2	1'31.202
13	41	(Spain) Aleix Espargaró	(Italy) Aprilia Racing	1'31.101	
14	49	(Italy) Fabio Di Giannantonio	(Italy) Pertamina Enduro VR46 Racing	1'31.260	
15	44	(Spain) Pol Espargaró	(Austria) Red Bull KTM Factory Racing	1'31.471	
16	5	(France) Johann Zarco	(Monaco) Castrol Honda LCR	1'31.485	
17	37	(Spain) Augusto Fernández	(France) Red Bull GASGAS Tech3	1'31.538	
18	88	(Portugal) Miguel Oliveira	(United States) Trackhouse Racing	1'31.543	
19	25	(Spain) Raúl Fernández	(United States) Trackhouse Racing	1'31.591	
20	42	(Spain) Álex Rins	(Japan) Monster Energy Yamaha MotoGP Team	1'31.721	
21	10	(Italy) Luca Marini	(Japan) Repsol Honda	1'31.923	
22	30	(Japan) Takaaki Nakagami	(Monaco) Idemitsu Honda LCR	1'32.071	
23	6	(Germany) Stefan Bradl	(Japan) HRC Test Team	1'32.972	

== MotoGP Sprint ==
The MotoGP Sprint was held on 7 September. With an excellent start, Jorge Martín immediately moved into first position without relinquishing it and won the Sprint race ahead of Francesco Bagnaia and Franco Morbidelli, at his first podium in the Sprint format, just ahead of Enea Bastianini in fourth position. Fifth was Marc Márquez, immediately followed by Pedro Acosta, sixth and the best of the KTMs. Seventh and eighth were the two factory KTMs of Brad Binder ahead of Jack Miller, while Fabio Quartararo closed the points positions in ninth place. Below are the results of the Sprint race (Classified finishers):

Pos.	No.	Rider	Team	Constructor	Laps	Time/Retired	Grid	Points
1	89	(Spain) Jorge Martín	Prima Pramac Racing	Ducati	13	19:56.502	4	12
2	1	(Italy) Francesco Bagnaia	Ducati Lenovo Team	Ducati	13	+1.495	1	9
3	21	(Italy) Franco Morbidelli	Prima Pramac Racing	Ducati	13	+1.832	2	7
4	23	(Italy) Enea Bastianini	Ducati Lenovo Team	Ducati	13	+2.041	8	6
5	93	(Spain) Marc Márquez	Gresini Racing MotoGP	Ducati	13	+6.469	9	5
6	31	(Spain) Pedro Acosta	Red Bull GasGas Tech3	KTM	13	+6.796	5	4
7	33	(South Africa) Brad Binder	Red Bull KTM Factory Racing	KTM	13	+9.979	6	3
8	43	(Australia) Jack Miller	Red Bull KTM Factory Racing	KTM	13	+10.726	12	2
9	20	(France) Fabio Quartararo	Monster Energy Yamaha MotoGP Team	Yamaha	13	+11.015	10	1
10	73	(Spain) Álex Márquez	Gresini Racing MotoGP	Ducati	13	+11.352	7	
11	12	(Spain) Maverick Viñales	Aprilia Racing	Aprilia	13	+11.658	11	
12	41	(Spain) Aleix Espargaró	Aprilia Racing	Aprilia	13	+12.083	13	
13	5	(France) Johann Zarco	Castrol Honda LCR	Honda	13	+21.119	16	
14	44	(Spain) Pol Espargaró	Red Bull KTM Factory Racing	KTM	13	+21.542	15	
15	88	(Portugal) Miguel Oliveira	Trackhouse Racing	Aprilia	13	+21.995	18	
16	37	(Spain) Augusto Fernández	Red Bull GasGas Tech3	KTM	13	+23.442 (Note: 3-second penalty for failing to properly serve a long-lap penalty.)	17	
17	25	(Spain) Raúl Fernández	Trackhouse Racing	Aprilia	13	+24.280	19	
18	10	(Italy) Luca Marini	Repsol Honda Team	Honda	13	+24.747	21	
19	42	(Spain) Álex Rins	Monster Energy Yamaha MotoGP Team	Yamaha	13	+24.873	20	
20	30	(Japan) Takaaki Nakagami	Idemitsu Honda LCR	Honda	13	+25.154	22	
Ret	49	(Italy) Fabio Di Giannantonio	Pertamina Enduro VR46 Racing Team	Ducati	6	Retired in pits	14	
Ret	72	(Italy) Marco Bezzecchi	Pertamina Enduro VR46 Racing Team	Ducati	4	Accident	3	
Ret	6	(Germany) Stefan Bradl	HRC Test Team	Honda	2	Retired	23	
Fastest lap: (Italy) Francesco Bagnaia (Ducati) – 1:31.236 (lap 2)
OFFICIAL MOTOGP SPRINT REPORT

== Race ==
=== MotoGP ===
Luca Marini did not take part in the race due to influenza.

The race started with skies threatening rain but it was dry at the start and Francesco Bagnaia held the race lead ahead of Jorge Martín. However, the first drops of rain began to fall after a few laps and the Spaniard decided to return to the pits attempting a gamble, together with Maverick Viñales, Pedro Acosta (already fallen earlier), Raúl Fernández and Álex Rins. However, the risk did not pay off as the rain stopped immediately, forcing the riders into a further stop and leaving them lapped, with only Martín in the points zone, fifteenth. Bagnaia gained a lot of ground but with the track wet many riders closed in, including Marc Márquez who passed him and never relinquished the race lead, winning his second consecutive race, ahead of the Italian who nevertheless gained 19 points on his rival. Enea Bastianini completed the podium in third. Fourth place went to Brad Binder ahead of Marco Bezzecchi and Fabio Quartararo, who equalled his best result of the season. Eighth was Jack Miller, followed by Fabio Di Giannantonio, returning from a shoulder injury. Tenth position went to Pol Espargaró, ahead of Miguel Oliveira, the only Aprilia in the points. They were followed by the three Hondas in the points of Johann Zarco, Takaaki Nakagami and wildcard Stefan Bradl, at his first points of the season. Below are the race results:

Pos.	No.	Rider	Team	Constructor	Laps	Time/Retired	Grid	Points
1	93	(Spain) Marc Márquez	Gresini Racing MotoGP	Ducati	27	41:52.083	9	25
2	1	(Italy) Francesco Bagnaia	Ducati Lenovo Team	Ducati	27	+3.102	1	20
3	23	(Italy) Enea Bastianini	Ducati Lenovo Team	Ducati	27	+5.428	8	16
4	33	(South Africa) Brad Binder	Red Bull KTM Factory Racing	KTM	27	+14.185	6	13
5	72	(Italy) Marco Bezzecchi	Pertamina Enduro VR46 Racing Team	Ducati	27	+16.725	3	11
6	73	(Spain) Álex Márquez	Gresini Racing MotoGP	Ducati	27	+17.582	7	10
7	20	(France) Fabio Quartararo	Monster Energy Yamaha MotoGP Team	Yamaha	27	+17.642	10	9
8	43	(Australia) Jack Miller	Red Bull KTM Factory Racing	KTM	27	+19.327	12	8
9	49	(Italy) Fabio Di Giannantonio	Pertamina Enduro VR46 Racing Team	Ducati	27	+27.946	14	7
10	44	(Spain) Pol Espargaró	Red Bull KTM Factory Racing	KTM	27	+38.781	15	6
11	88	(Portugal) Miguel Oliveira	Trackhouse Racing	Aprilia	27	+46.386	18	5
12	5	(France) Johann Zarco	Castrol Honda LCR	Honda	27	+1:02.637	16	4
13	30	(Japan) Takaaki Nakagami	Idemitsu Honda LCR	Honda	27	+1:10.717	22	3
14	6	(Germany) Stefan Bradl	HRC Test Team	Honda	27	+1:17.547	23	2
15	89	(Spain) Jorge Martín	Prima Pramac Racing	Ducati	26	+1 lap	4	1
16	12	(Spain) Maverick Viñales	Aprilia Racing	Aprilia	26	+1 lap	11	
17	31	(Spain) Pedro Acosta	Red Bull GasGas Tech3	KTM	26	+1 lap	5	
18	25	(Spain) Raúl Fernández	Trackhouse Racing	Aprilia	26	+1 lap	19	
19	42	(Spain) Álex Rins	Monster Energy Yamaha MotoGP Team	Yamaha	26	+1 lap	20	
Ret	41	(Spain) Aleix Espargaró	Aprilia Racing	Aprilia	14	Retired	13	
Ret	37	(Spain) Augusto Fernández	Red Bull GasGas Tech3	KTM	6	Accident	17	
Ret	21	(Italy) Franco Morbidelli	Prima Pramac Racing	Ducati	6	Accident	2	
DNS	10	(Italy) Luca Marini	Repsol Honda Team	Honda		Did not start	21	
WD	36	(Spain) Joan Mir	Repsol Honda Team	Honda		Withdrew		
Fastest lap: (Spain) Marc Márquez (Ducati) – 1:31.564 (lap 20)
OFFICIAL MOTOGP RACE REPORT

=== Moto2 ===
After more than two months since the previous time, Ai Ogura returned to victory, moving into the lead of the Riders' Championship. Second position went to Arón Canet and the final step of the podium to Tony Arbolino in third. Fourth position went to Manuel González, ahead of Jake Dixon in fifth. Fermín Aldeguer returned to the points after two races and finished sixth, followed by Filip Salač, seventh and at his best result of the season. An excellent eighth position went to Diogo Moreira ahead of Albert Arenas, Darryn Binder and Senna Agius. Twelfth, but dealing with several injuries, was Sergio García, who finished ahead of Joe Roberts. The points positions were completed by Somkiat Chantra and Marcos Ramírez. Below are the race results (Classified finishers):

Pos	No.	Rider	Team	Motorcycle	Laps	Time	Grid	Points
1	79	(Japan) Ai Ogura	MT Helmets - MSi	Boscoscuro B-24	22	35'26"583	3rd	25
2	44	(Spain) Arón Canet	Fantic Racing	Kalex	22	+0.609	4th	20
3	14	(Italy) Tony Arbolino	Elf Marc VDS Racing Team	Kalex	22	+4.639	1st	16
4	18	(Spain) Manuel González	QJMotor Gresini Moto2	Kalex	22	+6.948	9th	13
5	96	(United Kingdom) Jake Dixon	CFMoto Inde Aspar Team	Kalex	22	+10.863	14th	11
6	54	(Spain) Fermín Aldeguer	Beta Tools Speed Up	Boscoscuro B-24	22	+12.642	10th	10
7	12	(Czech Republic) Filip Salač	Elf Marc VDS Racing Team	Kalex	22	+13.542	11th	9
8	10	(Brazil) Diogo Moreira	Italtrans Racing Team	Kalex	22	+15.002	5th	8
9	75	(Spain) Albert Arenas	QJMotor Gresini Moto2	Kalex	22	+15.970	6th	7
10	15	(South Africa) Darryn Binder	Liqui Moly Husqvarna Intact GP	Kalex	22	+16.032	25th	6
11	81	(Australia) Senna Agius	Liqui Moly Husqvarna Intact GP	Kalex	22	+16.634	16th	5
12	3	(Spain) Sergio García	MT Helmets - MSi	Boscoscuro B-24	22	+17.939	24th	4
13	16	(United States) Joe Roberts	OnlyFans American Racing Team	Kalex	22	+20.560	7th	3
14	35	(Thailand) Somkiat Chantra	Idemitsu Honda Team Asia	Kalex	22	+20.943	22nd	2
15	24	(Spain) Marcos Ramírez	OnlyFans American Racing Team	Kalex	22	+21.308	12th	1
16	22	(Japan) Ayumu Sasaki	Yamaha VR46 Master Camp Team	Kalex	22	+24.708	17th	
17	52	(Spain) Jeremy Alcoba	Yamaha VR46 Master Camp Team	Kalex	22	+24.787	21st	
18	7	(Belgium) Barry Baltus	RW-Idrofoglia Racing GP	Kalex	22	+25.936	20th	
19	51	(Turkey) Deniz Öncü	Red Bull KTM Ajo	Kalex	22	+26.807	13th	
20	84	(Netherlands) Bo Bendsneyder	Preicanos Racing Team	Kalex	22	+27.123	15th	
21	28	(Spain) Izan Guevara	CFMoto Inde Aspar Team	Kalex	22	+30.171	26th	
22	71	(Italy) Dennis Foggia	Italtrans Racing Team	Kalex	22	+36.352	18th	
23	84	(Netherlands) Zonta van den Goorbergh	RW-Idrofoglia Racing GP	Kalex	22	+36.526	19th	
24	5	(Spain) Jaume Masiá	Preicanos Racing Team	Kalex	22	+37.046	27th	
25	34	(Indonesia) Mario Aji	Idemitsu Honda Team Asia	Kalex	22	+38.225	28th	
26	43	(Spain) Xavier Artigas	Klint Forward Factory Team	Forward	22	+55.095	31st	
27	20	(Andorra) Xavier Cardelús	Fantic Racing	Kalex	22	+56.207	29th	
28	40	(Spain) Unai Orradre	Klint Forward Factory Team	Forward	22	+1:05.082	30th	
29	21	(Spain) Alonso López	Beta Tools Speed Up	Boscoscuro B-24	21	+1 lap	8th	
Ret	13	(Italy) Celestino Vietti	Red Bull KTM Ajo	Kalex	19	Accident	2nd	
Ret	19	(Italy) Mattia Pasini	Team Ciatti Boscoscuro	Boscoscuro B-24	14	Retired in pits	23rd	
Fastest lap: (Spain) Alonso López (Boscoscuro) – 1:36.003 (lap 8)
OFFICIAL MOTO2 RACE REPORT

=== Moto3 ===
Ángel Piqueras took his first career victory, despite being given two long-lap penalties, also delivering the first seasonal victory for Leopard Racing. Just 35 thousandths behind was Daniel Holgado, while Iván Ortolá finished third. Just off the podium, also by only a few thousandths, was Taiyo Furusato ahead of Collin Veijer. Sixth position went to Joel Kelso thanks to the penalty given to David Alonso for exceeding track limits during the final lap. Tatsuki Suzuki finished eighth, while Luca Lunetta finished ninth, penalised and the best of the Italians, ahead of his teammate Filippo Farioli. Eleventh, and scoring points for the second time this season, was David Almansa, followed by Jacob Roulstone. The points positions were completed by Adrián Fernández, also penalised, ahead of Stefano Nepa and Scott Ogden. Below are the race results:

Pos	No.	Rider	Team	Motorcycle	Laps	Time	Grid	Points
1	36	(Spain) Ángel Piqueras	Leopard Racing	Honda NSF250RW	20	34'02"766	4th	25
2	96	(Spain) Daniel Holgado	Red Bull GASGAS Tech3	Gas Gas RC250GP	20	+0.035	7th	20
3	48	(Spain) Iván Ortolá	MT Helmets - MSi	KTM RC250GP	20	+0.226	3rd	16
4	72	(Japan) Taiyo Furusato	Honda Team Asia	Honda NSF250RW	20	+0.259	9th	13
5	95	(Netherlands) Collin Veijer	Liqui Moly Husqvarna Intact GP	Husqvarna FR250GP	20	+0.491	5th	11
6	66	(Australia) Joel Kelso	BOE Motorsports	KTM RC250GP	20	+0.977	6th	10
7	80	(Colombia) David Alonso	CFMoto Gaviota Aspar Team	CFMoto Moto3	20	+0.596	1st	9
8	24	(Japan) Tatsuki Suzuki	Liqui Moly Husqvarna Intact GP	Husqvarna FR250GP	20	+3.756	23rd	8
9	58	(Italy) Luca Lunetta	SIC58 Squadra Corse	Honda NSF250RW	20	+6.789	2nd	7
10	7	(Italy) Filippo Farioli	SIC58 Squadra Corse	Honda NSF250RW	20	+8.088	11th	6
11	22	(Spain) David Almansa	Kopron Rivacold Snipers Team	Honda NSF250RW	20	+8.122	19th	5
12	12	(Australia) Jacob Roulstone	Red Bull GASGAS Tech3	Gas Gas RC250GP	20	+8.400	17th	4
13	31	(Spain) Adrián Fernández	Leopard Racing	Honda NSF250RW	20	+9.366	8th	3
14	82	(Italy) Stefano Nepa	LevelUp - MTA	KTM RC250GP	20	+9.911	10th	2
15	19	(United Kingdom) Scott Ogden	FleetSafe Honda - MLav Racing	Honda NSF250RW	20	+11.067	20th	1
16	10	(Italy) Nicola Carraro	LevelUp - MTA	KTM RC250GP	20	+17.122	21st	
17	6	(Japan) Ryusei Yamanaka	MT Helmets - MSi	KTM RC250GP	20	+30.484	13th	
18	85	(Spain) Xabi Zurutuza	Red Bull KTM Ajo	KTM RC250GP	20	+32.041	22nd	
19	34	(Austria) Jakob Rosenthaler	Liqui Moly Husqvarna Intact GP	Husqvarna FR250GP	20	+32.138	27th	
20	55	(Switzerland) Noah Dettwiler	CIP Green Power	KTM RC250GP	20	+38.080	25th	
21	5	(Thailand) Tatchakorn Buasri	Honda Team Asia	Honda NSF250RW	20	+38.148	26th	
22	78	(Spain) Joel Esteban	CFMoto Gaviota Aspar Team	CFMoto Moto3	20	+43.960	24th	
Ret	18	(Italy) Matteo Bertelle	Kopron Rivacold Snipers Team	Honda NSF250RW	16	Accident	16th	
Ret	21	(Spain) Vicente Pérez	FleetSafe Honda - MLav Racing	Honda NSF250RW	16	Accident	18th	
Ret	99	(Spain) José Antonio Rueda	Red Bull KTM Ajo	KTM RC250GP	0	Accident	12th	
Ret	64	(Spain) David Muñoz	BOE Motorsports	KTM RC250GP	0	Accident	14th	
Ret	54	(Italy) Riccardo Rossi	CIP Green Power	KTM RC250GP	0	Accident	15th	
Fastest lap: (Spain) Ángel Piqueras (Honda NSF250RW) – 1:40.856 (lap 7)
OFFICIAL MOTO3 RACE REPORT

=== MotoE races ===
==== Race 1 ====
===== Classified finishers =====
Pos.	No.	Rider	Team	Laps	Time	Grid	Points
1st	40	(Italy) Mattia Casadei	LCR E-Team	8	13'24"775	1st	25
2nd	61	(Italy) Alessandro Zaccone	Tech3 E-Racing	8	+0.168	4th	20
3rd	51	(Brazil) Eric Granado	LCR E-Team	8	+1.125	2nd	16
4th	4	(Spain) Héctor Garzó	Dynavolt Intact GP	8	+1.401	8th	13
5th	81	(Spain) Jordi Torres	OpenBank Aspar Team	8	+1.551	3rd	11
6th	11	(Italy) Matteo Ferrari	Felo Gresini MotoE	8	+2.868	10th	10
7th	3	(Germany) Lukas Tulovic	Dynavolt Intact GP	8	+3.546	9th	9
8th	99	(Spain) Óscar Gutiérrez	Axxis - MSi	8	+4.217	6th	8
9th	29	(Italy) Nicholas Spinelli	Tech3 E-Racing	8	+6.704	7th	7
10th	9	(Italy) Andrea Mantovani	Klint Forward Factory Team	8	+9.087	12th	6
11th	77	(Spain) Miquel Pons	Axxis - MSi	8	+11.625	14th	5
12th	72	(Italy) Alessio Finello	Felo Gresini MotoE	8	+12.517	15th	4
13th	34	(Italy) Kevin Manfredi	Ongetta SIC58 Squadra Corse	8	+12.856	13th	3
14th	6	(Spain) María Herrera	Klint Forward Factory Team	8	+12.984	16th	2
15th	7	(United Kingdom) Chaz Davies	Aruba Cloud MotoE Racing Team	8	+22.973	17th	1
16th	80	(Italy) Armando Pontone	Aruba Cloud MotoE Racing Team	8	+23.376	18th	

===== Retirements =====
No.	Rider	Team	Laps	Grid
21	(Italy) Kevin Zannoni	OpenBank Aspar Team	6	5th
55	(Italy) Massimo Roccoli	Ongetta SIC58 Squadra Corse	1	11th

==== Race 2 ====
===== Classified finishers =====
Pos.	No.	Rider	Team	Laps	Time	Grid	Points
1st	99	(Spain) Óscar Gutiérrez	Axxis - MSi	8	13'29"676	6th	25
2nd	40	(Italy) Mattia Casadei	LCR E-Team	8	+0.109	1st	20
3rd	51	(Brazil) Eric Granado	LCR E-Team	8	+0.302	2nd	16
4th	81	(Spain) Jordi Torres	OpenBank Aspar Team	8	+1.381	3rd	13
5th	21	(Italy) Kevin Zannoni	OpenBank Aspar Team	8	+1.842	5th	11
6th	11	(Italy) Matteo Ferrari	Felo Gresini MotoE	8	+1.984	10th	10
7th	4	(Spain) Héctor Garzó	Dynavolt Intact GP	8	+2.085	8th	9
8th	61	(Italy) Alessandro Zaccone	Tech3 E-Racing	8	+2.522	4th	8
9th	9	(Italy) Andrea Mantovani	Klint Forward Factory Team	8	+5.222	11th	7
10th	77	(Spain) Miquel Pons	Axxis - MSi	8	+6.773	13th	6
11th	29	(Italy) Nicholas Spinelli	Tech3 E-Racing	8	+8.505	7th	5
12th	72	(Italy) Alessio Finello	Felo Gresini MotoE	8	+11.115	14th	4
13th	6	(Spain) María Herrera	Klint Forward Factory Team	8	+11.385	15th	3
14th	34	(Italy) Kevin Manfredi	Ongetta SIC58 Squadra Corse	8	+12.797	12th	2
15th	7	(United Kingdom) Chaz Davies	Aruba Cloud MotoE Racing Team	8	+17.650	16th	1
16th	80	(Italy) Armando Pontone	Aruba Cloud MotoE Racing Team	8	+17.956	17th	
17th	3	(Germany) Lukas Tulovic	Dynavolt Intact GP	8	+57.331	9th	

== Championship standings after the race ==
Below are the standings for the top five riders, constructors, and teams after the round.

=== MotoGP ===
Riders' Championship standings

	Pos.	Rider	Points
	1	(Spain) Jorge Martín	312
	2	(Italy) Francesco Bagnaia	305
	3	(Spain) Marc Márquez	259
	4	(Italy) Enea Bastianini	250
1	5	(South Africa) Brad Binder	161

Constructors' Championship standings

	Pos.	Constructor	Points
	1	(Italy) Ducati	463
1	2	(Austria) KTM	234
1	3	(Italy) Aprilia	224
	4	(Japan) Yamaha	72
	5	(Japan) Honda	37

Teams' Championship standings

	Pos.	Team	Points
	1	(Italy) Ducati Lenovo Team	555
	2	(Italy) Prima Pramac Racing	402
	3	(Italy) Gresini Racing MotoGP	373
	4	(Italy) Aprilia Racing	258
1	5	(Austria) Red Bull KTM Factory Racing	219

=== Moto2 ===
Riders' Championship standings

	Pos.	Rider	Points
1	1	(Japan) Ai Ogura	175
1	2	(Spain) Sergio García	166
1	3	(United States) Joe Roberts	133
1	4	(Spain) Alonso López	133
	5	(United Kingdom) Jake Dixon	130

Constructors' Championship standings

Pos.	Constructor	Points
1	(Italy) Boscoscuro	275
2	(Germany) Kalex	267
3	(Switzerland) Forward	6

Teams' Championship standings

Pos.	Team	Points
1	(Spain) MT Helmets – MSi	341
2	(Italy) Beta Tools Speed Up	255
3	(United States) OnlyFans American Racing Team	198
4	(Italy) QJmotor Gresini Moto2	178
5	(Spain) CFMoto Inde Aspar Team	155

=== Moto3 ===
Riders' Championship standings

	Pos.	Rider	Points
	1	(Colombia) David Alonso	246
2	2	(Spain) Daniel Holgado	176
	3	(Spain) Iván Ortolá	173
2	4	(Netherlands) Collin Veijer	173
	5	(Spain) David Muñoz	117

Constructors' Championship standings

Pos.	Constructor	Points
1	(China) CFMoto	246
2	(Austria) KTM	240
3	(Sweden) Husqvarna	190
4	(Spain) Gas Gas	181
5	(Japan) Honda	172

Teams' Championship standings

Pos.	Team	Points
1	(Spain) CFMoto Gaviota Aspar Team	288
2	(Spain) MT Helmets – MSi	258
3	(Germany) Liqui Moly Husqvarna Intact GP	231
4	(France) Red Bull GasGas Tech3	226
5	(Spain) Boé Motorsports	210

=== MotoE ===
Riders' Championship standings

	Pos.	Rider	Points
	1	(Spain) Héctor Garzó	246
	2	(Italy) Mattia Casadei	231
1	3	(Spain) Oscar Gutiérrez	208
1	4	(Italy) Kevin Zannoni	191
	5	(Italy) Alessandro Zaccone	179

Teams' Championship standings

	Pos.	Team	Points
	1	(Germany) Dynavolt Intact GP MotoE	357
2	2	(Monaco) LCR E-Team	343
1	3	(Spain) Openbank Aspar Team	343
1	4	(France) Tech3 E-Racing	328
	5	(Spain) Axxis – MSi	302

== Notes ==
Previous race: 2024 Aragon Grand Prix	FIM Grand Prix World Championship; 2024 season	Next race: 2024 Emilia Romagna Grand Prix
Previous race: 2023 San Marino Grand Prix	San Marino and Rimini Riviera motorcycle Grand Prix	Next race: 2025 San Marino Grand Prix
