= Gresini Racing =

Motorcycle racing team from Italy

- 2026 name: MotoGP: BK8 Gresini Racing MotoGP; Moto2: Italjet Gresini Moto2
- Base: Faenza, Italy
- Principal: Nadia Padovani
- Rider(s): MotoGP: 54. Fermín Aldeguer; 73. Álex Márquez; Moto2: 3. Sergio García; 21. Alonso López
- Motorcycle: MotoGP: Ducati Desmosedici; Moto2: Kalex Moto2
- Tyres: MotoGP: Michelin; Moto2: Pirelli
- Riders' Championships: 250cc: 2001: Daijiro Kato; Moto2: 2010: Toni Elías; Moto3: 2018: Jorge Martín; MotoE: 2019: Matteo Ferrari; CIV Moto3: 2020: Kevin Zannoni
- Teams' Championships: Moto3: 2018

Gresini Racing is a motorcycle racing team competing in the MotoGP World Championship under the name BK8 Gresini Racing MotoGP as a Ducati satellite team and the Moto2 World Championship as Italjet Gresini Moto2.

== History ==
=== The beginning with Honda ===
Fausto Gresini founded the team in 1997 with Fabrizio Cecchini as the technical director.

The team competed in the 500 cc class with Brazilian rider Alex Barros and a Honda NSR500V two-cylinder bike.

Barros ranked ninth in the final championship standings, and managed to record the team's first podium finish at Donington Park.

The following year, Honda decided to supply Barros and the team with a Honda NSR500 four-cylinder bike, the same bike that was used by the factory team.

Barros recorded two podium finishes and a series of top-five finishes to collect 138 points and fifth place in the final standings.

=== 250 cc class times ===
In 1999, the team dropped down to the 250 cc class with a factory-supported Honda NSR250 and with reigning 250cc world champion Loris Capirossi as the rider.

In the first race of the season at Sepang, Malaysia, Capirossi took the first ever win for the Gresini team. During the season, he earned two more wins and six other podium finishes, and finished the season third in the final standings with 209 points.

=== The Kato-Philippe duo ===
After Capirossi stepped up to the 500 cc for the 2000 season, the team signed young Japanese rider Daijiro Kato and French rider Vincent Philippe.

Kato, who had already won two races as a wild-card racer in 1997 and 1998, made an instant impact with four consecutive podium finishes at the start of the season.

He became a title contender for the 250 cc title along with Yamaha riders Shinya Nakano and Olivier Jacque until the last race of the season at Phillip Island, Australia.

However, Kato finished third in the race and lost the title and the runner-up position to Jacque and Nakano respectively.

Kato's 259 points and third place in the championship handed him the Rookie of the Year award in the 250cc class.

=== Kato-Alzamora duo ===
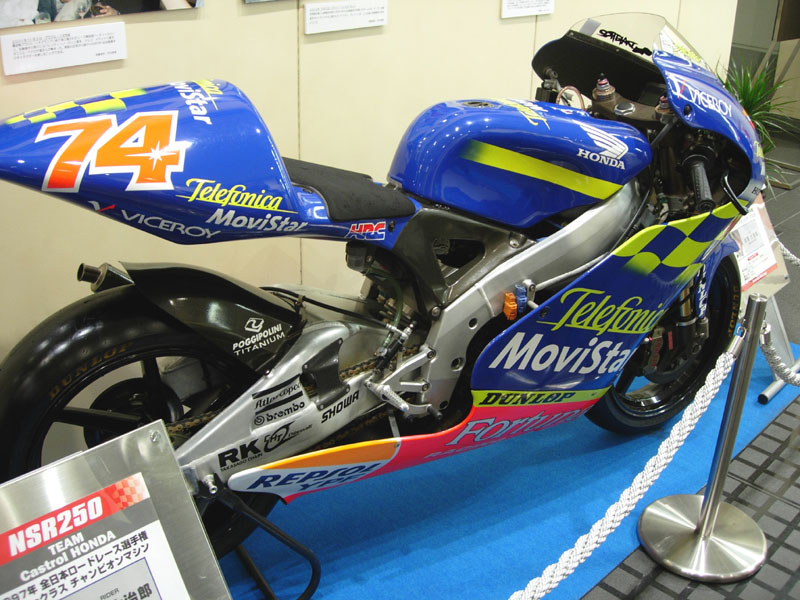
Daijiro Kato's championship-winning 2001 Honda NSR250

In 2001, the team was renamed Telefónica Movistar Honda and former 125 cc world champion Emilio Alzamora was signed to replace Philippe.

With both Nakano and Jacque moving to the 500cc class, Kato became the main contender for the 250 cc title.

Kato dominated the season by winning 11 races during the season, handing the Gresini team their first world title.

Alzamora added two podium finishes for the team as he went on to finish seventh in the final standings.

=== Return to the premier class ===
The team returned to the premier class in 2002 as Fortuna Honda Gresini with Kato as their sole rider.

Due to the rule changes, the 500 cc class was renamed MotoGP and the new 990 cc four-stroke bikes were introduced by the factory teams.

== MotoGP ==
Kato rode the older Honda NSR500 two-stroke bike for the first nine races of the new MotoGP season before he received the new Honda RC211V prior to the Czech Republic Grand Prix at Brno.

At the Spanish Grand Prix, Kato finished in second place for his first podium finish in the MotoGP class.

He matched his best finish with another second place at Brno, in his first race with the new four-stroke bike.

He also recorded the team's first ever pole position in the MotoGP class in the Pacific Grand Prix at Motegi, Japan.

Kato ranked seventh in the final standings with 117 points and won the Rookie of the Year award, while the team ranked eighth in the MotoGP team standings.

The team also competed in the 250cc class with Alzamora and Italian rider Roberto Rolfo. Rolfo was ranked third in the final standings with seven podium finishes while Alzamora was seventh with two podiums.

=== Expansion ===
In 2003, the team expanded their MotoGP class effort to two riders and was renamed Telefónica Movistar Honda as title sponsor Telefónica joined from Suzuki. Former Suzuki rider Sete Gibernau also joined the team as their second rider.

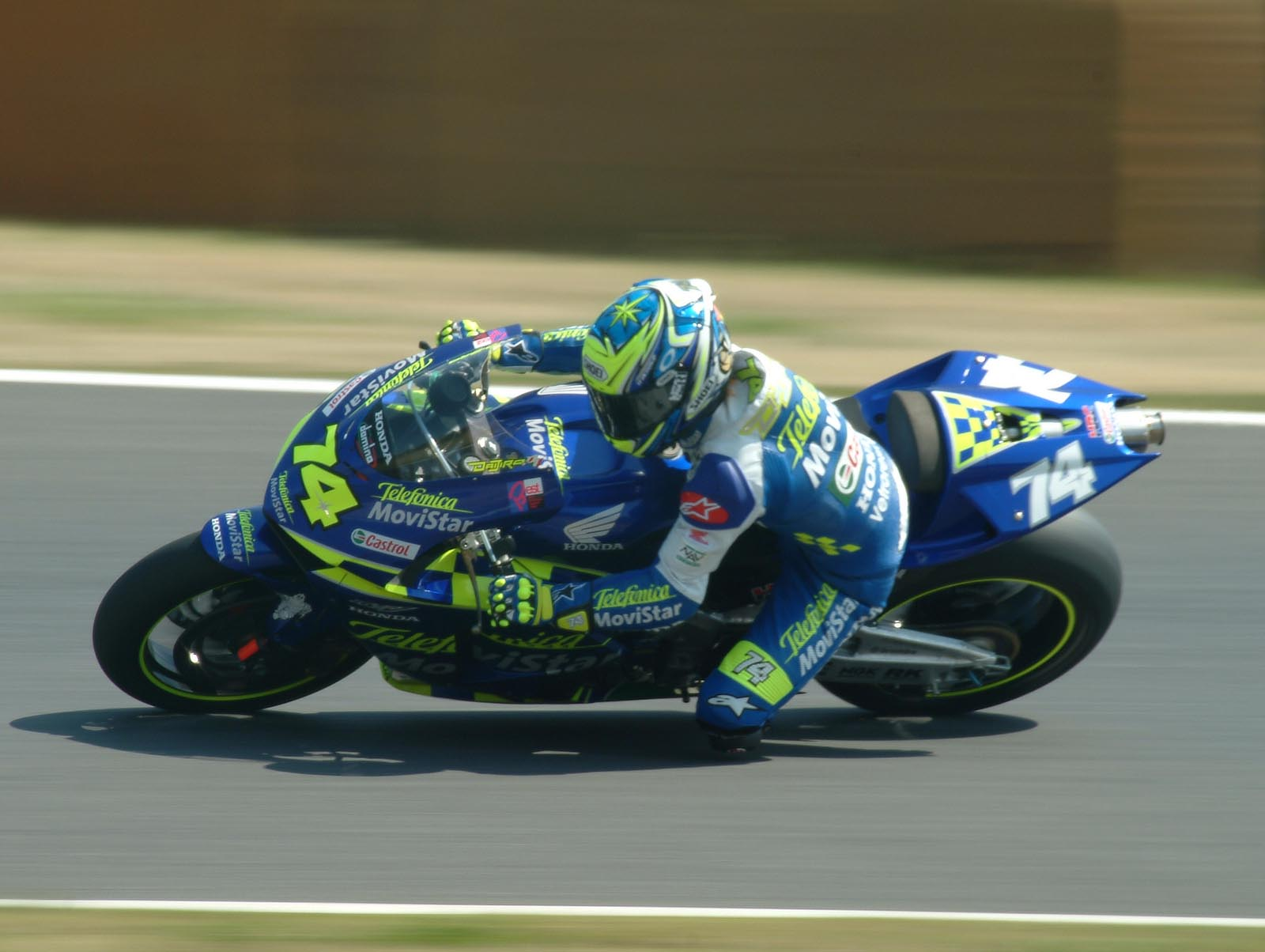
Daijiro Kato on a Telefónica Movistar Honda RC211V at the 2003 Japanese Grand Prix before he crashed on lap 3, and died two weeks later

Kato remained with the team and became one of four Honda official riders, riding the latest 2003-spec RC211V, while Gibernau was given the modified 2002 bike.

In the opening race at Suzuka, Japan, Kato crashed into the tyre barrier. He suffered serious injuries and went into a coma for two weeks before he died in hospital.

A week after Kato's death, Gibernau started from pole position and won the South African Grand Prix at Welkom, which marked the first race win for the Gresini team in the MotoGP class.

During the post-race interview, Gibernau dedicated the win for his late teammate. He remained as the team's sole rider until reigning Japanese Supersport champion Ryuichi Kiyonari joined the team from the fourth race onwards.

The team also promoted Gibernau to the 2003-spec bike left by Kato, while Kiyonari received the modified 2002 bike.

Gibernau won three more races and recorded a total of ten podium finishes as he took the second place in the championship with 277 points. The team was ranked fourth in the teams standings as Gibernau and Kiyonari scored a combined 299 points.

=== Gibernau era ===
In 2004, Gibernau fought for the championship and finished runner-up. His teammate, Colin Edwards, finished fifth.

Gibernau remained with the team for 2005 and was joined by Marco Melandri.

Melandri won two races. In 2006 the team lined up Melandri and Toni Elías with Elías bringing Fortuna sponsorship back to the team, and the team achieved four victories, three for Melandri and one for Elías.

Both riders remained with the team in 2007, albeit losing the Fortuna sponsorship due to European Tobacco Regulations. The team also changed their tyre supplier to Bridgestone.

The new 800 cc Honda RC212V did not deliver the results expected and the team finished the season with 2 podiums.

For 2008, Alex de Angelis and Shinya Nakano joined the team, with a new sponsor – San Carlo.

For 2009, Elías re-joined the team, replacing Nakano who deferred to World Superbikes.

In 2010, Marco Melandri re-joined the team after a turbulent period riding for Ducati and Kawasaki, with 2008 250cc champion Marco Simoncelli announced as his new teammate, who finished eighth overall while Melandri ended the season in tenth place.

For 2011, Simoncelli was promoted to ride a factory Honda as part of the Gresini team, whilst Hiroshi Aoyama rode a satellite Honda for the team.

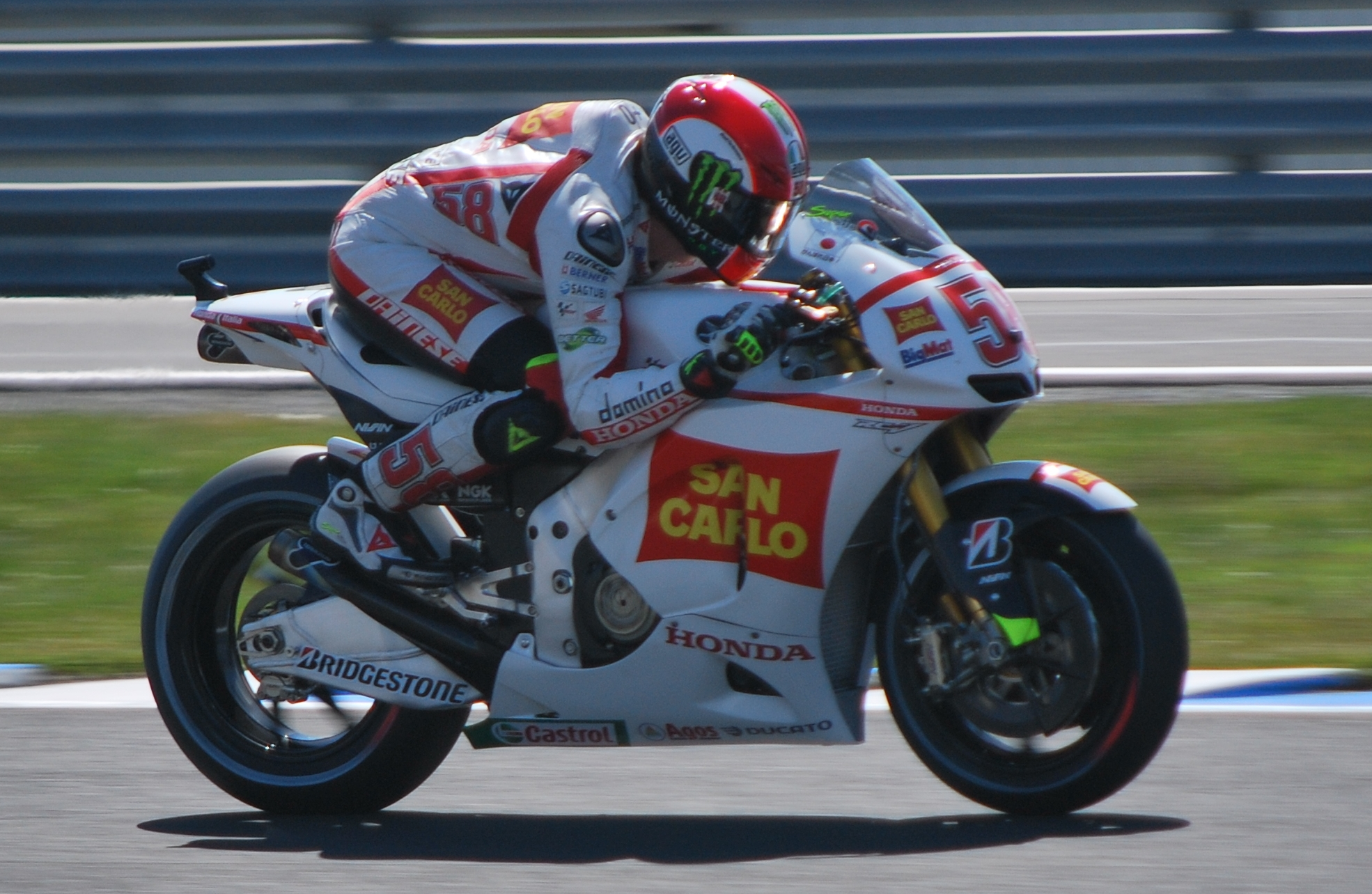
Marco Simoncelli at the 2011 Australian Grand Prix a week before he died at the Malaysian Grand Prix

Simoncelli was competitive at the top end of the field, but a number of crashes kept his points score low.

In October 2011, it was announced that Simoncelli would remain with the team for the 2012 season, however, Aoyama announced a move to Castrol Honda in the Superbike World Championship.

On 23 October 2011, Simoncelli died after a racing accident at the Malaysian Grand Prix.

=== A new era with Aprilia ===
In 2015, Gresini ended their long-standing partnership with Honda in the premier class.

Aprilia returned to the MotoGP paddock with a factory effort with track-side operations to be managed by Gresini.

Aleix Espargaró scored his first podium in MotoGP during the 2021 British Grand Prix, marking the first MotoGP-era podium for Aprilia and Gresini Racing's first podium since the 2014 French Grand Prix with Álvaro Bautista.

=== As Ducati's satellite team ===
For 2022, Aprilia re-entered the sport with their own factory team, taking incumbent riders Maverick Viñales and Espargaró.

Gresini elected to return to fully independent team status with Ducati machinery, fielding former Gresini Moto3 teammates Enea Bastianini and Fabio Di Giannantonio. Bastianini secured the team's first-ever premier class victory at the season-opening Qatar Grand Prix, with more victories in the United States, France, and Aragon. Di Giannantonio secured the team's first-ever pole position at Mugello, but his season was marked by struggling with MotoGP machinery. Bastianini, who had the standout result of 3rd in the riders' championship, was promoted to the Ducati factory team for 2023, and he was replaced by Álex Márquez who joined from LCR Honda.

Di Giannantonio took Gresini's only feature race win of 2023 at the Qatar Grand Prix, with Álex Márquez taking the team's first sprint victories at Silverstone and Sepang. Di Giannantonio moved to the VR46 Racing Team following his standout performances in the latter half of the 2023 season.

Eight-time world champion Marc Márquez joined Gresini for 2024, after 11 years with Repsol Honda, joining his brother Álex.

During the 2024 season, the Márquez brothers, fielding the same Ducati Desmosedici, most notably shared a podium in the German Grand Prix, 27 years after the fate in 1997 City of Imola Grand Prix by the Aoki brothers, Nobuatsu and Takuma. All 3 of Gresini's victories in 2024 were thanks to Marc Márquez, winning at Aragon, Misano, and Phillip Island. At final season, Márquez finished in 3rd place in the championship standings.

Spanish rookie Fermín Aldeguer replaced the outgoing Marc Márquez at Gresini, who joined Ducati Corse, for 2025 and 2026. The Gresini team continued its streak of race victories, as Álex Márquez secured his maiden Grand Prix victory at Jerez. The pairing of Márquez and Aldeguer had also accumulated 5 additional podiums between them, with Aldeguer's first at the rain-affected French Grand Prix with 3rd place. Aldeguer would take his maiden MotoGP victory at the Indonesian Grand Prix, becoming the first independent team rider since Jorge Martín in 2021 to win in his rookie season. The Malaysian Grand Prix was a big weekend for the team, as they clinched the independent team of the year title, with Álex Márquez securing runner-up in the championship with his third victory of the season, and Fermín Aldeguer clinching Rookie of the year award. This is the best season for the team since Marco Melandri in 2005 got 2nd place.

For 2026, the team is still using the same rider lineup, Álex Márquez and Fermín Aldeguer.

For 2027, Álex Márquez and Fermín Aldeguer will no longer be with the team as they part ways. They will be replaced by rookie Daniel Holgado and Joan Mir, who will join the team for the 2027 season.

== Other divisions ==
=== Moto2 ===
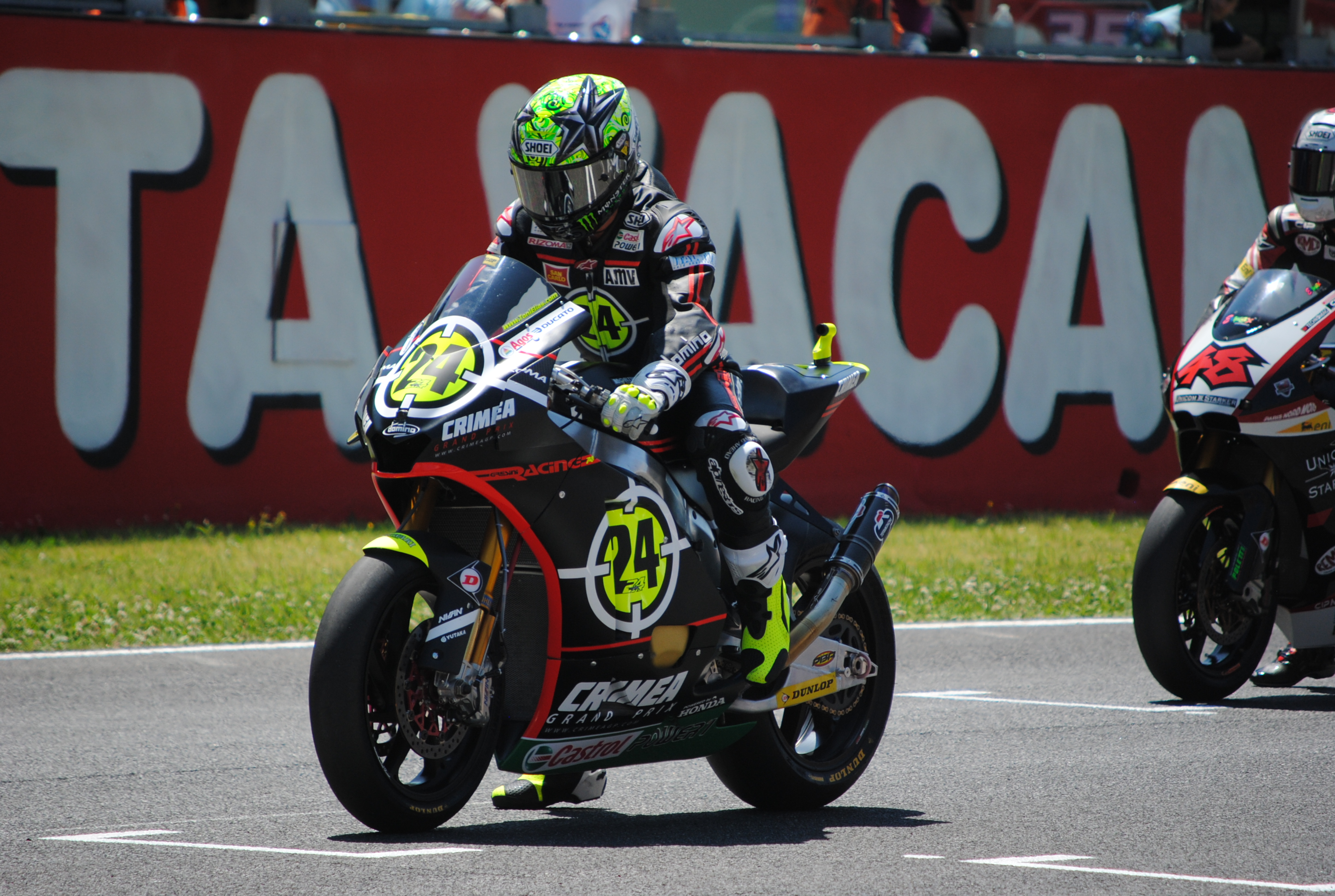
Toni Elías won the 2010 Moto2 World Championship with Gresini Racing Moriwaki

The team has been competing in Moto2 since 2010.

Gresini rider Toni Elías won the inaugural Moto2 title on a Honda powered Moriwaki chassis.

The team was formerly known as QJmotor Gresini Racing before Gresini ended the sponsorship in 2024.

== Former divisions ==
=== Moto3 ===
The team started competing in Moto3 in 2012.

In 2015, Gresini began using Honda machinery in their Moto3 programme, replacing KTM.

In 2018, Gresini achieved a 1-2 championship finish in Moto3 with riders Jorge Martín and Fabio Di Giannantonio.

In 2021, Gresini left the Moto3 class in order to focus on their MotoGP and Moto2 efforts, after a decade in the class.

=== MotoE ===
In 2019, Gresini was granted two slots in the newly created MotoE class, as all other satellite teams in the MotoGP class.

With two wins and only finishes within the top-5 on the season, rider Matteo Ferrari clinched the inaugural MotoE Cup.

== Ownership ==
The team was founded in 1997 by Fausto Gresini (1961–2021), a two-time 125cc world champion, after the end of his racing career.

On 23 February 2021, Fausto Gresini died after a two-month battle with COVID-19.

The team continued with Gresini's wife Nadia Padovani taking over as team owner and principal.

== Results ==
=== Grand Prix motorcycle racing ===
==== By rider ====
Year	Class	Team name	Bike	Riders	Races	Wins	Podiums	Poles	F. laps	Points	Pos.
2022	MotoGP	Gresini Racing MotoGP	Ducati Desmosedici GP21	(Italy) Enea Bastianini	20	4	6	1	3	219	3rd
2022	MotoGP	Gresini Racing MotoGP	Ducati Desmosedici GP21	(Italy) Fabio Di Giannantonio	20	0	0	1	0	24	20th
2023	MotoGP	Gresini Racing MotoGP	Ducati Desmosedici GP22	(Spain) Álex Márquez	17	0	2	1	2	177	9th
2023	MotoGP	Gresini Racing MotoGP	Ducati Desmosedici GP22	(Italy) Fabio Di Giannantonio	20	1	2	0	0	151	12th
2024	MotoGP	Gresini Racing MotoGP	Ducati Desmosedici GP23	(Spain) Marc Márquez	20	3	10	2	4	392	3rd
2024	MotoGP	Gresini Racing MotoGP	Ducati Desmosedici GP23	(Spain) Álex Márquez	20	0	1	0	0	173	8th
2025	MotoGP	BK8 Gresini Racing MotoGP	Ducati Desmosedici GP24	(Spain) Álex Márquez	22	3	12	1	5	467	2nd
2025	MotoGP	BK8 Gresini Racing MotoGP	Ducati Desmosedici GP24	(Spain) Fermín Aldeguer	22	1	3	0	1	214	8th
2026	MotoGP	BK8 Gresini Racing MotoGP	Ducati Desmosedici GP26	(Spain) Álex Márquez	15	1	3	1	1	197*	8th*
2026	MotoGP	BK8 Gresini Racing MotoGP	Ducati Desmosedici GP26	(Spain) Iker Lecuona	2	0	0	0	0	16 (18)*	21st*
2026	MotoGP	BK8 Gresini Racing MotoGP	Ducati Desmosedici GP26	(Italy) Michele Pirro	1	0	0	0	0	0*	32nd*
2026	MotoGP	BK8 Gresini Racing MotoGP	Ducati Desmosedici GP25	(Spain) Fermín Aldeguer	14	0	1	0	1	129*	11th*
2026	MotoGP	BK8 Gresini Racing MotoGP	Ducati Desmosedici GP25	(Spain) Iker Lecuona	2	0	0	0	0	2 (18)*	21st*
2026	MotoGP	BK8 Gresini Racing MotoGP	Ducati Desmosedici GP25	(Italy) Michele Pirro	1	0	0	0	0	0*	32nd*

==== By year ====
Year	Class	Team name	Motorcycle	Riders	Races	Wins	Podiums	Poles	F. laps	Points	Pos.
1997	500cc	Fortuna Honda Gresini	Honda NSR500V	(Brazil) Alex Barros	15	0	1	0	0	101	9th
1998	500cc	Fortuna Honda Gresini	Honda NSR500	(Brazil) Alex Barros	14	0	2	0	2	138	5th
1999	250cc	Elf Axo Honda Gresini	Honda NSR250	(Italy) Loris Capirossi	15	3	9	2	3	209	**3rd**
2000	250cc	Axo Honda Gresini	Honda NSR250	(Japan) Daijiro Kato	16	4	9	3	1	259	**3rd**
2000	250cc	Axo Honda Gresini	TSR-Honda AC29M	(France) Vincent Philippe	12	0	0	0	0	14	23rd
2001	250cc	Telefónica Movistar Honda	Honda NSR250	(Japan) Daijiro Kato	16	11	13	6	9	322	**1st**
2001	250cc	Telefónica Movistar Honda	Honda NSR250	(Spain) Emilio Alzamora	16	0	2	0	0	136	7th
2002	MotoGP	Fortuna Honda Gresini	Honda NSR500; Honda RC211V (Note: Kato rode a Honda NSR500 two-stroke bike in the first nine races, and a Honda RC211V four-stroke bike in the last seven races of the season.)	(Japan) Daijiro Kato	16	0	2	1	1	117	7th
2002	250cc	Fortuna Honda Gresini	Honda NSR250	(Italy) Roberto Rolfo	16	0	7	0	2	219	**3rd**
2002	250cc	Fortuna Honda Gresini	Honda NSR250	(Spain) Emilio Alzamora	15	0	2	0	0	120	7th
2002	250cc	Fortuna Honda Gresini	Honda NSR250	(Spain) David García	1	0	0	0	0	6	30th
2003	MotoGP	Telefónica Movistar Honda	Honda RC211V	(Spain) Sete Gibernau	16	4	10	1	1	277	**2nd**
2003	MotoGP	Telefónica Movistar Honda	Honda RC211V	(Japan) Ryuichi Kiyonari	13	0	0	0	0	22	20th
2003	MotoGP	Telefónica Movistar Honda	Honda RC211V	(Japan) Daijiro Kato	1	0	0	0	0	0	NC
2004	MotoGP	Telefónica Movistar Honda MotoGP	Honda RC211V	(Spain) Sete Gibernau	16	4	10	5	3	257	**2nd**
2004	MotoGP	Telefónica Movistar Honda MotoGP	Honda RC211V	(United States) Colin Edwards	16	0	2	0	2	157	5th
2005	MotoGP	Movistar Honda MotoGP	Honda RC211V	(Italy) Marco Melandri	17	2	7	0	3	220	**2nd**
2005	MotoGP	Movistar Honda MotoGP	Honda RC211V	(Spain) Sete Gibernau	17	0	4	5	1	150	7th
2006	MotoGP	Fortuna Honda	Honda RC211V	(Italy) Marco Melandri	17	3	7	0	0	228	4th
2006	MotoGP	Fortuna Honda	Honda RC211V	(Spain) Toni Elías	15	1	1	0	1	116	9th
2007	MotoGP	Honda Gresini	Honda RC212V	(Italy) Marco Melandri	17	0	3	0	0	187	5th
2007	MotoGP	Honda Gresini	Honda RC212V	(Spain) Toni Elías	15	0	2	0	2	104	12th
2007	MotoGP	Honda Gresini	Honda RC212V	(Italy) Michel Fabrizio	1	0	0	0	0	6	21st
2007	MotoGP	Honda Gresini	Honda RC212V	(Canada) Miguel Duhamel	1	0	0	0	0	0	NC
2008	MotoGP	San Carlo Honda Gresini	Honda RC212V	(Japan) Shinya Nakano	18	0	0	0	0	126	9th
2008	MotoGP	San Carlo Honda Gresini	Honda RC212V	(San Marino) Alex de Angelis	18	0	0	0	0	63	14th
2009	MotoGP	San Carlo Honda Gresini	Honda RC212V	(Spain) Toni Elías	17	0	1	0	0	115	7th
2009	MotoGP	San Carlo Honda Gresini	Honda RC212V	(San Marino) Alex de Angelis	17	0	1	0	0	111	8th
2010	MotoGP	San Carlo Honda Gresini	Honda RC212V	(Italy) Marco Simoncelli	18	0	0	0	0	125	8th
2010	MotoGP	San Carlo Honda Gresini	Honda RC212V	(Italy) Marco Melandri	17	0	0	0	0	103	10th
2010	Moto2	Gresini Racing Moto2	Moriwaki MD600	(Spain) Toni Elías	17	7	8	3	2	271	**1st**
2010	Moto2	Gresini Racing Moto2	Moriwaki MD600	(Italy) Michele Pirro	1	0	0	0	0	2	36th
2010	Moto2	Gresini Racing Moto2	Moriwaki MD600	(Ukraine) Vladimir Ivanov	15	0	0	0	0	2	37th
2010	Moto2	Gresini Racing Moto2	Moriwaki MD600	(Japan) Tatsuya Yamaguchi	1	0	0	0	0	0	NC
2011	MotoGP	San Carlo Honda Gresini	Honda RC212V	(Italy) Marco Simoncelli	16	0	2	2	0	139	6th
2011	MotoGP	San Carlo Honda Gresini	Honda RC212V	(Japan) Hiroshi Aoyama (Note: Aoyama rode for Repsol Honda Team in the 2011 Dutch TT and was replaced by Akiyoshi.)	16 (17) (Note: Non-bracketed number refers to the number accumulated with team, with number in brackets referring to the total accumulated for the season.)	0	0	0	0	90 (98)	10th
2011	MotoGP	San Carlo Honda Gresini	Honda RC212V	(Japan) Kousuke Akiyoshi	1 (2)	0	0	0	0	3 (7)	20th
2011	Moto2	Gresini Racing Moto2	Moriwaki MD600	(Italy) Michele Pirro	17	1	2	1	0	84	9th
2011	Moto2	Gresini Racing Moto2	Moriwaki MD600	(Japan) Yuki Takahashi	17	0	2	0	0	77	11th
2012	MotoGP	San Carlo Honda Gresini	Honda RC213V	(Spain) Álvaro Bautista	18	0	2	1	0	178	5th
2012	MotoGP	San Carlo Honda Gresini	FTR-Honda MGP12	(Italy) Michele Pirro	18	0	0	0	0	43	15th
2012	Moto2	Federal Oil Gresini Moto2	Moriwaki MD600; Suter MMXII	(United Kingdom) Gino Rea	17	0	1	0	0	21	21st
2012	Moto2	Thai Honda Gresini Moto2	Moriwaki MD600; Suter MMXII	(Thailand) Ratthapark Wilairot	17	0	0	0	0	9	27th
2012	Moto3	San Carlo Gresini Moto3	Honda NSF250R	(Italy) Niccolò Antonelli	17	0	0	0	0	77	14th
2012	Moto3	San Carlo Gresini Moto3	FTR-Honda M312	(Italy) Niccolò Antonelli	17	0	0	0	0	77	14th
2013	MotoGP	GO&FUN Honda Gresini	Honda RC213V	(Spain) Álvaro Bautista	18	0	0	0	0	171	6th
2013	MotoGP	GO&FUN Honda Gresini	FTR-Honda MGP13	(Australia) Bryan Staring	18	0	0	0	0	2	26th
2013	Moto2	Federal Oil Gresini Moto2; Thai Honda PTT Gresini Moto2	Suter MMX2	(Indonesia) Doni Tata Pradita	16	0	0	0	0	1	28th
2013	Moto2	Federal Oil Gresini Moto2; Thai Honda PTT Gresini Moto2	Suter MMX2	(Thailand) Ratthapark Wilairot	8	0	0	0	0	0	NC
2013	Moto2	Federal Oil Gresini Moto2; Thai Honda PTT Gresini Moto2	Suter MMX2	(Thailand) Thitipong Warokorn	7	0	0	0	0	0	NC
2013	Moto2	Federal Oil Gresini Moto2; Thai Honda PTT Gresini Moto2	Suter MMX2	(Italy) Franco Morbidelli	3	0	0	0	0	0	NC
2013	Moto3	GO&FUN Gresini Moto3	FTR-Honda M313	(Italy) Niccolò Antonelli	17	0	0	0	0	47	16th
2013	Moto3	GO&FUN Gresini Moto3	FTR-Honda M313	(Italy) Lorenzo Baldassarri	17	0	0	0	0	0	NC
2014	MotoGP	GO&FUN Honda Gresini	Honda RC213V	(Spain) Álvaro Bautista	18	0	1	0	1	89	11th
2014	MotoGP	GO&FUN Honda Gresini	Honda RCV1000R	(United Kingdom) Scott Redding	18	0	0	0	0	81	12th
2014	Moto2	Federal Oil Gresini Moto2; Gresini Moto2	Suter MMX2	(Belgium) Xavier Siméon	18	0	1	0	0	63	14th
2014	Moto2	Federal Oil Gresini Moto2; Gresini Moto2	Suter MMX2	(Italy) Lorenzo Baldassarri	18	0	0	0	0	20	25th
2014	Moto3	Junior Team GO&FUN Moto3	KTM RC250GP	(Italy) Enea Bastianini	18	0	3	0	0	127	9th
2014	Moto3	Junior Team GO&FUN Moto3	KTM RC250GP	(Italy) Niccolò Antonelli	18	0	0	1	0	68	14th
2015	MotoGP	Aprilia Racing Team Gresini	Aprilia RS-GP	(Spain) Álvaro Bautista	18	0	0	0	0	31	16th
2015	MotoGP	Aprilia Racing Team Gresini	Aprilia RS-GP	(Germany) Stefan Bradl (Note: Bradl joined the team after leaving Forward Racing.)	9 (17)	0	0	0	0	8 (17)	18th
2015	MotoGP	Aprilia Racing Team Gresini	Aprilia RS-GP	(Italy) Marco Melandri	8	0	0	0	0	0	NC
2015	MotoGP	Aprilia Racing Team Gresini	Aprilia RS-GP	(United Kingdom) Michael Laverty	1	0	0	0	0	0	NC
2015	Moto2	Federal Oil Gresini Moto2; Gresini Moto2	Kalex Moto2 2014	(Belgium) Xavier Siméon	18	1	2	1	0	113	7th
2015	Moto2	Federal Oil Gresini Moto2; Gresini Moto2	Kalex Moto2 2014	(Italy) Mattia Pasini	2	0	0	0	0	0	NC
2015	Moto3	Gresini Racing Team Moto3	Honda NSF250RW	(Italy) Enea Bastianini	18	1	6	4	2	207	**3rd**
2015	Moto3	Gresini Racing Team Moto3	Honda NSF250RW	(Italy) Andrea Locatelli	14	0	0	0	0	33	20th
2015	Moto3	Gresini Racing Team Moto3	Honda NSF250RW	(Italy) Fabio Di Giannantonio	1	0	0	0	0	0	NC
2016	MotoGP	Aprilia Racing Team Gresini	Aprilia RS-GP	(Spain) Álvaro Bautista	18	0	0	0	0	82	12th
2016	MotoGP	Aprilia Racing Team Gresini	Aprilia RS-GP	(Germany) Stefan Bradl	17	0	0	0	0	63	16th
2016	Moto2	Federal Oil Gresini Moto2	Kalex Moto2	(United Kingdom) Sam Lowes	18	2	6	5	2	175	5th
2016	Moto3	Gresini Racing Team Moto3	Honda NSF250RW	(Italy) Enea Bastianini	16	1	6	3	0	177	**2nd**
2016	Moto3	Gresini Racing Team Moto3	Honda NSF250RW	(Italy) Fabio Di Giannantonio	10	0	3	0	0	134	6th
2016	Moto3	Gresini Racing Team Moto3	Honda NSF250RW	(Japan) Ayumu Sasaki	1	0	0	0	0	0	NC
2017	MotoGP	Aprilia Racing Team Gresini	Aprilia RS-GP	(Spain) Aleix Espargaró	17	0	0	0	0	62	15th
2017	MotoGP	Aprilia Racing Team Gresini	Aprilia RS-GP	(United Kingdom) Sam Lowes	18	0	0	0	0	5	25th
2017	Moto2	Federal Oil Gresini Moto2	Kalex Moto2	(Spain) Jorge Navarro	17	0	0	0	0	60	14th
2017	Moto3	Del Conca Gresini Moto3	Honda NSF250RW	(Spain) Jorge Martín	16	1	9	9	2	196	4th
2017	Moto3	Del Conca Gresini Moto3	Honda NSF250RW	(Italy) Fabio Di Giannantonio	18	0	5	0	2	153	5th
2018	MotoGP	Aprilia Racing Team Gresini	Aprilia RS-GP	(Spain) Aleix Espargaró	17	0	0	0	0	44	17th
2018	MotoGP	Aprilia Racing Team Gresini	Aprilia RS-GP	(United Kingdom) Scott Redding	18	0	0	0	0	21	21st
2018	Moto2	Federal Oil Gresini Moto2	Kalex Moto2	(Spain) Jorge Navarro	18	0	0	0	0	58	13th
2018	Moto3	Del Conca Gresini Moto3	Honda NSF250RW	(Spain) Jorge Martín	17	7	10	11	3	260	**1st**
2018	Moto3	Del Conca Gresini Moto3	Honda NSF250RW	(Italy) Fabio Di Giannantonio	18	2	6	0	1	218	**2nd**
2019	MotoGP	Aprilia Racing Team Gresini	Aprilia RS-GP	(Spain) Aleix Espargaró	19	0	0	0	0	63	14th
2019	MotoGP	Aprilia Racing Team Gresini	Aprilia RS-GP	(Italy) Andrea Iannone	17	0	0	0	0	43	16th
2019	Moto2	Federal Oil Gresini Moto2	Kalex Moto2	(United Kingdom) Sam Lowes	19	0	0	0	0	66	16th
2019	Moto3	Kömmerling Gresini Moto3	Honda NSF250RW	(Argentina) Gabriel Rodrigo	14	0	0	1	1	67	18th
2019	Moto3	Kömmerling Gresini Moto3	Honda NSF250RW	(Italy) Riccardo Rossi	19	0	0	0	0	8	32nd
2019	Moto3	Kömmerling Gresini Moto3	Honda NSF250RW	(Spain) Jeremy Alcoba	2	0	0	0	0	2	33rd
2019	MotoE	Trentino Gresini MotoE	Energica	(Italy) Matteo Ferrari	6	2	3	0	1	99	**1st**
2019	MotoE	Trentino Gresini MotoE	Energica	(Italy) Lorenzo Savadori	6	0	0	0	0	24	16th
2020	MotoGP	Aprilia Racing Team Gresini	Aprilia RS-GP	(Spain) Aleix Espargaró	14	0	0	0	0	42	17th
2020	MotoGP	Aprilia Racing Team Gresini	Aprilia RS-GP	(United Kingdom) Bradley Smith	11	0	0	0	0	12	21st
2020	MotoGP	Aprilia Racing Team Gresini	Aprilia RS-GP	(Italy) Lorenzo Savadori	3	0	0	0	0	0	25th
2020	Moto2	Federal Oil Gresini Moto2	Kalex Moto2	(Italy) Nicolò Bulega	15	0	0	0	0	32	20th
2020	Moto2	Federal Oil Gresini Moto2	Kalex Moto2	(Spain) Edgar Pons	15	0	0	0	0	5	26th
2020	Moto3	Kömmerling Gresini Moto3	Honda NSF250RW	(Spain) Jeremy Alcoba	15	0	1	0	0	87	11th
2020	Moto3	Kömmerling Gresini Moto3	Honda NSF250RW	(Argentina) Gabriel Rodrigo	15	0	0	1	1	80	13th
2020	MotoE	TRENTINO Gresini MotoE	Energica	(Italy) Matteo Ferrari	7	2	4	1	0	97	**2nd**
2020	MotoE	TRENTINO Gresini MotoE	Energica	(Italy) Alessandro Zaccone	7	0	0	0	0	37	12th
2021	MotoGP	Aprilia Racing Team Gresini	Aprilia RS-GP	(Spain) Aleix Espargaró	18	0	1	0	0	120	8th
2021	MotoGP	Aprilia Racing Team Gresini	Aprilia RS-GP	(Spain) Maverick Viñales	5	0	0	0	0	11 (106) (Note: Non-bracketed number refers to the number accumulated with the motorcycle, with number in brackets referring to the total accumulated for the season.)	10th
2021	MotoGP	Aprilia Racing Team Gresini	Aprilia RS-GP	(Italy) Lorenzo Savadori	10	0	0	0	0	4	26th
2021	Moto2	Federal Oil Gresini Moto2	Kalex Moto2	(Italy) Fabio Di Giannantonio	18	1	4	0	0	161	7th
2021	Moto2	Federal Oil Gresini Moto2	Kalex Moto2	(Italy) Nicolò Bulega	16	0	0	0	0	12	26th
2021	Moto3	Indonesian Racing Gresini Moto3	Honda NSF250RW	(Spain) Jeremy Alcoba	18	0	2	1	0	86	12th
2021	Moto3	Indonesian Racing Gresini Moto3	Honda NSF250RW	(Argentina) Gabriel Rodrigo	13	0	1	1	1	60	19th
2021	MotoE	Indonesian E-Racing Gresini MotoE	Energica	(Italy) Matteo Ferrari	7	1	1	0	1	86	**3rd**
2021	MotoE	Indonesian E-Racing Gresini MotoE	Energica	(Italy) Andrea Mantovani	6	0	0	0	0	29	14th
2022	MotoGP	Gresini Racing MotoGP	Ducati Desmosedici GP21	(Italy) Enea Bastianini	20	4	6	1	3	219	**3rd**
2022	MotoGP	Gresini Racing MotoGP	Ducati Desmosedici GP21	(Italy) Fabio Di Giannantonio	20	0	0	1	0	24	20th
2022	Moto2	Gresini Racing Moto2	Kalex Moto2	(Czech Republic) Filip Salač	20	0	1	0	0	45	20th
2022	Moto2	Gresini Racing Moto2	Kalex Moto2	(Italy) Alessandro Zaccone	20	0	0	0	0	9	24th
2022	MotoE	Felo Gresini MotoE	Energica	(Italy) Matteo Ferrari	12	2	5	0	2	162.5	**3rd**
2022	MotoE	Felo Gresini MotoE	Energica	(Italy) Alessio Finello	12	0	0	0	0	9	20th
2023	MotoGP	Gresini Racing MotoGP	Ducati Desmosedici GP22	(Spain) Álex Márquez	17	0	2	1	2	177	9th
2023	MotoGP	Gresini Racing MotoGP	Ducati Desmosedici GP22	(Italy) Fabio Di Giannantonio	20	1	2	0	0	151	12th
2023	Moto2	QJmotor Gresini Moto2	Kalex Moto2	(Czech Republic) Filip Salač	19	0	1	1	0	110	11th
2023	Moto2	QJmotor Gresini Moto2	Kalex Moto2	(Spain) Jeremy Alcoba	20	0	0	0	1	48.5	18th
2023	Moto2	QJmotor Gresini Moto2	Kalex Moto2	(Italy) Matteo Ferrari	1	0	0	0	0	0	NC
2023	MotoE	Felo Gresini MotoE	Ducati V21L	(Italy) Matteo Ferrari	16	3	7	4	3	216	**3rd**
2023	MotoE	Felo Gresini MotoE	Ducati V21L	(Italy) Alessio Finello	16	0	0	0	0	35	16th
2024	MotoGP	Gresini Racing MotoGP	Ducati Desmosedici GP23	(Spain) Marc Márquez	20	3	10	2	4	392	**3rd**
2024	MotoGP	Gresini Racing MotoGP	Ducati Desmosedici GP23	(Spain) Álex Márquez	20	0	1	0	0	173	8th
2024	Moto2	QJmotor Gresini Moto2; Gresini Moto2	Kalex Moto2	(Spain) Manuel González	20	1	5	1	1	195	**3rd**
2024	Moto2	QJmotor Gresini Moto2; Gresini Moto2	Kalex Moto2	(Spain) Albert Arenas	20	0	0	0	0	88	13th
2024	Moto2	QJmotor Gresini Moto2; Gresini Moto2	Kalex Moto2	(Italy) Matteo Ferrari	2	0	0	0	0	1	29th
2024	MotoE	Felo Gresini MotoE	Ducati V21L	(Italy) Matteo Ferrari	16	0	0	0	1	132	8th
2024	MotoE	Felo Gresini MotoE	Ducati V21L	(Italy) Alessio Finello	16	0	0	0	0	70	14th
2025	MotoGP	BK8 Gresini Racing MotoGP	Ducati Desmosedici GP24	(Spain) Álex Márquez	22	3	12	1	5	467	**2nd**
2025	MotoGP	BK8 Gresini Racing MotoGP	Ducati Desmosedici GP24	(Spain) Fermín Aldeguer	22	1	3	0	1	214	8th
2025	Moto2	Italjet Gresini Moto2	Kalex Moto2	(Spain) Albert Arenas	22	0	1	0	1	156	8th
2025	Moto2	Italjet Gresini Moto2	Kalex Moto2	(South Africa) Darryn Binder	20	0	0	0	0	19	24th
2025	Moto2	Italjet Gresini Moto2	Kalex Moto2	(Spain) Sergio García	2 (8)	0	0	0	0	0 (3)	28th
2025	MotoE	Felo Gresini MotoE	Ducati V21L	(Italy) Matteo Ferrari	14	3	5	1	2	168	**3rd**
2025	MotoE	Felo Gresini MotoE	Ducati V21L	(Italy) Alessio Finello	14	0	0	0	0	54	14th
2026	MotoGP	BK8 Gresini Racing MotoGP	Ducati Desmosedici GP26	(Spain) Álex Márquez	15	1	3	1	1	197*	8th*
2026	MotoGP	BK8 Gresini Racing MotoGP	Ducati Desmosedici GP26	(Spain) Iker Lecuona	2	0	0	0	0	16 (18)*	21st*
2026	MotoGP	BK8 Gresini Racing MotoGP	Ducati Desmosedici GP26	(Italy) Michele Pirro	1	0	0	0	0	0*	32nd*
2026	MotoGP	BK8 Gresini Racing MotoGP	Ducati Desmosedici GP25	(Spain) Fermín Aldeguer	14	0	1	0	1	129*	11th*
2026	MotoGP	BK8 Gresini Racing MotoGP	Ducati Desmosedici GP25	(Spain) Iker Lecuona	2	0	0	0	0	2 (18)*	21st*
2026	MotoGP	BK8 Gresini Racing MotoGP	Ducati Desmosedici GP25	(Italy) Michele Pirro	1	0	0	0	0	0*	32nd*
2026	Moto2	Italjet Gresini Moto2	Kalex Moto2	(Spain) Alonso López	16	1	1	1	0	134.5*	9th*
2026	Moto2	Italjet Gresini Moto2	Kalex Moto2	(Spain) Sergio García	16	0	0	0	0	11*	26th*
2026	Moto2	Italjet Gresini Moto2	Kalex Moto2	(Italy) Matteo Ferrari	2	0	0	0	0	0*	34th*
2026	Moto2	Italjet Gresini Moto2	Kalex Moto2	(Poland) Milan Pawelec	3 (4)	0	0	0	0	0*	35th*

* Season still in progress.

==== MotoGP results ====
(key) (Races in bold indicate pole position; races in italics indicate fastest lap)

Year	Motorcycle	Tyres	Riders	1	2	3	4	5	6	7	8	9	10	11	12	13	14	15	16	17	18	19	20	21	22	Points	RC	Points	TC
2002		M		JPN	SAF	ESP	FRA	ITA	CAT	NED	GBR	GER	CZE	POR	RIO	PAC	MAL	AUS	VAL										
2002	Honda NSR500	M	(Japan) Daijiro Kato	10	4	2	Ret	Ret	8	12	7	Ret														117	8th	117	8th
2002	Honda RC211V	M	(Japan) Daijiro Kato										2	Ret	Ret	**Ret**	5	4	4							117	8th	117	8th
2003	Honda RC211V	M		JPN	SAF	ESP	FRA	ITA	CAT	NED	GBR	GER	CZE	POR	RIO	PAC	MAL	AUS	VAL										
2003	Honda RC211V	M	(Spain) Sete Gibernau	4	**1**	Ret	1	7	3	1	2	1	2	4	2	4	2	4	2							277	2nd	299	4th
2003	Honda RC211V	M	(Japan) Ryuichi Kiyonari				13	13	11	17	14	18	15	16	15	11	21	19	14							22	20th	299	4th
2003	Honda RC211V	M	(Japan) Daijiro Kato	Ret																						0	NC	299	4th
2004	Honda RC211V	M		SAF	ESP	FRA	ITA	CAT	NED	RIO	GER	GBR	CZE	POR	JPN	QAT	MAL	AUS	VAL										
2004	Honda RC211V	M	(Spain) Sete Gibernau	3	1	**1**	**2**	**2**	2	Ret	Ret	3	**1**	4	6	1	7	**2**	4							257	2nd	414	2nd
2004	Honda RC211V	M	(United States) Colin Edwards	7	7	5	12	5	6	6	5	2	7	9	Ret	2	11	4	8							157	5th	414	2nd
2005	Honda RC211V	M		ESP	POR	CHN	FRA	ITA	CAT	NED	USA	GBR	GER	CZE	JPN	MAL	QAT	AUS	TUR	VAL									
2005	Honda RC211V	M	(Italy) Marco Melandri	3	4	3	4	4	3	2	Ret	Ret	7	6	Ret	5	2	4	1	1						220	2nd	**370**	**3rd**
2005	Honda RC211V	M	(Spain) Sete Gibernau	2	Ret	**4**	2	Ret	**2**	5	5	Ret	2	**Ret**	Ret	Ret	5	5	**4**	**Ret**						150	7th	**370**	**3rd**
2006	Honda RC211V	M		ESP	QAT	TUR	CHN	FRA	ITA	CAT	NED	GBR	GER	USA	CZE	MAL	AUS	JPN	POR	VAL									
2006	Honda RC211V	M	(Italy) Marco Melandri	5	7	1	7	1	6	Ret	7	3	2	3	5	9	1	3	8	5						228	4th	344	4th
2006	Honda RC211V	M	(Spain) Toni Elías	4	8	5	11	9	7	Ret	DNS		11	15	11	Ret	9	6	1	6						116	9th	344	4th
2006	Honda RC211V	M	(Italy) Michel Fabrizio									DNS														0	NC	344	4th
2007	Honda RC212V	B		QAT	ESP	TUR	CHN	FRA	ITA	CAT	GBR	NED	GER	USA	CZE	SMR	POR	JPN	AUS	MAL	VAL								
2007	Honda RC212V	B	(Italy) Marco Melandri	5	8	5	5	2	9	9	10	10	6	3	DNS	4	5	5	10	2	4					187	5th	297	5th
2007	Honda RC212V	B	(Spain) Toni Elías	14	4	2	Ret	Ret	6	Ret	12	DNS			11	7	8	3	15	6	10					104	12th	297	5th
2007	Honda RC212V	B	(Italy) Michel Fabrizio										10													6	21st	297	5th
2007	Honda RC212V	B	(Canada) Miguel Duhamel											Ret												0	NC	297	5th
2008	Honda RC212V	B		QAT	ESP	POR	CHN	FRA	ITA	CAT	GBR	NED	GER	USA	CZE	SMR	IND	JPN	AUS	MAL	VAL								
2008	Honda RC212V	B	(Japan) Shinya Nakano	13	9	10	10	10	9	9	9	8	9	10	4	12	17	8	5	5	7					126	9th	189	6th
2008	Honda RC212V	B	(San Marino) Alex de Angelis	Ret	14	11	16	12	4	Ret	15	Ret	4	13	8	Ret	10	17	Ret	14	10					63	14th	189	6th
2009	Honda RC212V	B		QAT	JPN	ESP	FRA	ITA	CAT	NED	USA	GER	GBR	CZE	IND	SMR	POR	AUS	MAL	VAL									
2009	Honda RC212V	B	(Spain) Toni Elías	9	15	9	10	14	Ret	12	6	6	Ret	3	9	6	6	10	7	6						115	7th	226	5th
2009	Honda RC212V	B	(San Marino) Alex de Angelis	6	13	14	11	15	12	10	11	5	4	8	2	Ret	Ret	4	12	10						111	8th	226	5th
2010	Honda RC212V	B		QAT	ESP	FRA	ITA	GBR	NED	CAT	GER	USA	CZE	IND	SMR	ARA	JPN	MAL	AUS	POR	VAL								
2010	Honda RC212V	B	(Italy) Marco Simoncelli	11	11	10	9	7	9	Ret	6	Ret	11	7	14	7	6	8	6	4	6					125	8th	228	5th
2010	Honda RC212V	B	(Italy) Marco Melandri	13	8	6	5	Ret	DNS	9	10	8	8	Ret	10	9	11	9	9	9	13					103	10th	228	5th
2011	Honda RC212V	B		QAT	ESP	POR	FRA	CAT	GBR	NED	ITA	GER	USA	CZE	IND	SMR	ARA	JPN	AUS	MAL	VAL								
2011	Honda RC212V	B	(Italy) Marco Simoncelli	5	Ret	Ret	5	**6**	Ret	**9**	5	6	Ret	3	12	4	4	4	2	C						139	6th	232	4th
2011	Honda RC212V	B	(Japan) Hiroshi Aoyama	10	4	7	8	Ret	9		11	15	10	9	9	11	11	9	Ret	C	12					90 (98) (Note: Non-bracketed number refers to the number accumulated with the motorcycle, with number in brackets referring to the total accumulated for the season.)	10th	232	4th
2011	Honda RC212V	B	(Japan) Kousuke Akiyoshi							13																3 (7)	20th	232	4th
2012		B		QAT	ESP	POR	FRA	CAT	GBR	NED	GER	ITA	USA	IND	CZE	SMR	ARA	JPN	MAL	AUS	VAL								
2012	Honda RC213V	B	(Spain) Álvaro Bautista	7	6	6	10	6	**4**	Ret	7	10	8	5	6	3	6	3	6	5	4					178	5th	221	5th
2012	FTR MGP12	B	(Italy) Michele Pirro	NC	Ret	14	14	14	13	9	Ret	DSQ	Ret	Ret	14	10	15	15	12	14	5					43	15th	221	5th
2013		B		QAT	AME	ESP	FRA	ITA	CAT	NED	GER	USA	IND	CZE	GBR	SMR	ARA	MAL	AUS	JPN	VAL								
2013	Honda RC213V	B	(Spain) Álvaro Bautista	6	8	6	6	Ret	Ret	7	5	4	6	5	5	7	4	5	5	4	5					171	6th	173	5th
2013	FTR-Honda MGP13	B	(Australia) Bryan Staring	Ret	20	16	Ret	18	14	21	Ret	17	19	20	21	Ret	18	18	DSQ	22	19					2	26th	173	5th
2014		B		QAT	AME	ARG	ESP	FRA	ITA	CAT	NED	GER	IND	CZE	GBR	SMR	ARA	JPN	AUS	MAL	VAL								
2014	Honda RC213V	B	(Spain) Álvaro Bautista	Ret	Ret	Ret	6	3	8	Ret	7	9	Ret	10	Ret	8	7	10	6	Ret	16					89	11th	170	5th
2014	Honda RCV1000R	B	(United Kingdom) Scott Redding	7	Ret	14	13	12	13	13	12	11	9	11	10	13	10	16	7	10	10					81	12th	170	5th
2015	Aprilia RS-GP	B		QAT	AME	ARG	ESP	FRA	ITA	CAT	NED	GER	IND	CZE	GBR	SMR	ARA	JPN	AUS	MAL	VAL								
2015	Aprilia RS-GP	B	(Spain) Álvaro Bautista	Ret	15	19	15	15	14	10	17	14	18	13	10	15	13	16	14	15	14					31	16th	39	11th
2015	Aprilia RS-GP	B	(Germany) Stefan Bradl										20	14	Ret	16	18	18	21	10	18					8 (17)	18th	39	11th
2015	Aprilia RS-GP	B	(Italy) Marco Melandri	21	Ret	20	19	18	18	Ret	19															0	NC	39	11th
2015	Aprilia RS-GP	B	(United Kingdom) Michael Laverty									20														0	NC	39	11th
2016	Aprilia RS-GP	M		QAT	ARG	AME	ESP	FRA	ITA	CAT	NED	GER	AUT	CZE	GBR	SMR	ARA	JPN	AUS	MAL	VAL								
2016	Aprilia RS-GP	M	(Spain) Álvaro Bautista	13	10	11	Ret	9	Ret	8	Ret	10	16	16	10	10	9	7	12	7	11					82	12th	145	7th
2016	Aprilia RS-GP	M	(Germany) Stefan Bradl	Ret	7	10	14	10	14	12	8	DNS	19	14	Ret	12	10	10	11	17	13					63	16th	145	7th
2017	Aprilia RS-GP	M		QAT	ARG	AME	ESP	FRA	ITA	CAT	NED	GER	CZE	AUT	GBR	SMR	ARA	JPN	AUS	MAL	VAL								
2017	Aprilia RS-GP	M	(Spain) Aleix Espargaró	6	Ret	17	9	Ret	Ret	Ret	10	7	8	13	Ret	Ret	6	7	Ret		Ret					62	15th	67	12th
2017	Aprilia RS-GP	M	(United Kingdom) Sam Lowes	18	Ret	Ret	16	14	19	19	Ret	Ret	18	20	Ret	Ret	22	13	19	Ret	Ret					5	25th	67	12th
2018	Aprilia RS-GP	M		QAT	ARG	AME	ESP	FRA	ITA	CAT	NED	GER	CZE	AUT	GBR	SMR	ARA	THA	JPN	AUS	MAL	VAL							
2018	Aprilia RS-GP	M	(Spain) Aleix Espargaró	19	Ret	10	Ret	9	Ret	Ret	13	DNS	15	17	C	14	6	13	Ret	9	11	Ret				44	17th	64	10th
2018	Aprilia RS-GP	M	(United Kingdom) Scott Redding	20	12	17	15	Ret	Ret	12	14	15	Ret	20	C	21	16	16	19	13	19	11				20	21st	64	10th
2019	Aprilia RS-GP	M		QAT	ARG	AME	ESP	FRA	ITA	CAT	NED	GER	CZE	AUT	GBR	SMR	ARA	THA	JPN	AUS	MAL	VAL							
2019	Aprilia RS-GP	M	(Spain) Aleix Espargaró	10	9	Ret	11	12	11	Ret	12	Ret	18	14	Ret	12	7	Ret	15	10	13	9				63	14th	106	9th
2019	Aprilia RS-GP	M	(Italy) Andrea Iannone	14	17	12	DNS	Ret	15	11	10	13	17	16	10	DNS	11	15	Ret	6	DSQ	DSQ				43	16th	106	9th
2020	Aprilia RS-GP	M		SPA	ANC	CZE	AUT	STY	RSM	EMI	CAT	FRA	ARA	TER	EUR	VAL	POR												
2020	Aprilia RS-GP	M	(Spain) Aleix Espargaró	Ret	Ret	10	11	12	13	Ret	12	14	13	Ret	Ret	9	8									42	17th	54	11th
2020	Aprilia RS-GP	M	(United Kingdom) Bradley Smith	15	12	17	13	19	19	13	16	Ret	19	15												12	21st	54	11th
2020	Aprilia RS-GP	M	(Italy) Lorenzo Savadori												Ret	18	Ret									0	25th	54	11th
2021	Aprilia RS-GP	M		QAT	DOH	POR	SPA	FRA	ITA	CAT	GER	NED	STY	AUT	GBR	ARA	RSM	AME	EMI	ALG	VAL								
2021	Aprilia RS-GP	M	(Spain) Aleix Espargaró	7	10	6	6	Ret	7	Ret	7	8	Ret	10	3	4	8	Ret	7	Ret	9					120	8th	135	9th
2021	Aprilia RS-GP	M	(Spain) Maverick Viñales													18	13		8	16	16					11 (106)	10th	135	9th
2021	Aprilia RS-GP	M	(Italy) Lorenzo Savadori	19	20	14	19	Ret	15	15	Ret	16	DNS		DNS				DNS							4	26th	135	9th
2022	Ducati Desmosedici GP21	M		QAT	INA	ARG	AME	POR	SPA	FRA	ITA	CAT	GER	NED	GBR	AUT	RSM	ARA	JPN	THA	AUS	MAL	VAL						
2022	Ducati Desmosedici GP21	M	(Italy) Enea Bastianini	1	11	10	1	Ret	8	1	Ret	Ret	10	11	4	Ret	2	1	9	6	5	2	8			219	3rd	243	7th
2022	Ducati Desmosedici GP21	M	(Italy) Fabio Di Giannantonio	17	18	Ret	21	Ret	18	13	**11**	Ret	8	14	22	11	20	19	17	18	20	Ret	15			24	20th	243	7th
2023	Ducati Desmosedici GP22	M		POR	ARG	AME	SPA	FRA	ITA	GER	NED	GBR	AUT	CAT	RSM	IND	JPN	INA	AUS	THA	MAL	QAT	VAL						
2023	Ducati Desmosedici GP22	M	(Spain) Álex Márquez	6^{9}	**3**^{5}	Ret	8	Ret	Ret	7^{8}	6^{9}	Ret^{1}	5^{4}	6	11^{9}	DNS		DNS	9	Ret^{8}	2^{1}	6^{4}	6^{8}			177	9th	328	6th
2023	Ducati Desmosedici GP22	M	(Italy) Fabio Di Giannantonio	Ret	10	9	12	8	14	9	Ret	13	17	10	17	Ret	8^{8}	4^{6}	3	9	9	1^{2}	4^{6}			151	12th	328	6th
2024	Ducati Desmosedici GP23	M		QAT	POR	AME	SPA	FRA	CAT	ITA	NED	GER	GBR	AUT	ARA	RSM	EMI	INA	JPN	AUS	THA	MAL	SLD						
2024	Ducati Desmosedici GP23	M	(Spain) Marc Márquez	4^{5}	16^{2}	Ret^{2}	**2**^{6}	2^{2}	3^{2}	4^{2}	10	2^{6}	4	4	**1**^{1}	1^{5}	3^{4}	Ret^{3}	3^{3}	1^{2}	11^{4}	12^{2}	2^{7}			392	3rd	565	3rd
2024	Ducati Desmosedici GP23	M	(Spain) Álex Márquez	6^{7}	Ret	15	4	10	7	9^{8}	7^{8}	3^{9}	7^{6}	10	Ret^{4}	6	9	Ret	Ret^{7}	15	10^{5}	4^{4}	4^{5}			173	8th	565	3rd
2025	Ducati Desmosedici GP24	M		THA	ARG	AME	QAT	SPA	FRA	GBR	ARA	ITA	NED	GER	CZE	AUT	HUN	CAT	RSM	JPN	INA	AUS	MAL	POR	VAL				
2025	Ducati Desmosedici GP24	M	(Spain) Álex Márquez	2^{2}	2^{2}	2^{2}	6^{2}	1^{2}	Ret^{2}	5^{1}	2^{2}	2^{2}	Ret^{2}	2^{8}	Ret	10^{2}	14^{8}	**1**	3^{2}	6	3^{4}	4^{6}	1^{2}	2^{1}	6^{1}	467	2nd	681	2nd
2025	Ducati Desmosedici GP24	M	(Spain) Fermín Aldeguer	13	16	Ret	5^{4}	Ret^{5}	3^{3}	8	6^{3}	12^{9}	Ret^{7}	5	11	2^{6}	16^{5}	15	6^{6}	10	1^{2}	14	Ret^{7}	4^{6}	5	214	8th	681	2nd
2026		M		THA	BRA	USA	SPA	FRA	CAT	ITA	HUN	CZE	NED	GER	GBR	ARA	RSM	AUT	JPN	INA	AUS	MAL	QAT	POR	VAL				
2026	Ducati Desmosedici GP26	M	(Spain) Álex Márquez	Ret	6^{7}	7^{4}	1	Ret^{8}	Ret^{1}			DNS	5	Ret^{2}	4^{4}	4^{2}	2^{5}	Ret^{5}	Ret	7^{5}	C^{2}	**3**				197*	8th*	344*	6th*
2026	Ducati Desmosedici GP26	M	(Spain) Iker Lecuona								7												10^{9}			16 (18)*	21st*	344*	6th*
2026	Ducati Desmosedici GP26	M	(Italy) Michele Pirro							19																0*	32nd*	344*	6th*
2026	Ducati Desmosedici GP25	M	(Spain) Fermín Aldeguer		8	11	9	9	2	8^{6}	Ret^{5}	6^{8}	DNS			6^{6}	4^{8}	8^{8}	9	Ret^{7}			12			129*	11th*	344*	6th*
2026	Ducati Desmosedici GP25	M	(Spain) Iker Lecuona												Ret						C^{9}	15				2 (18)*	21st*	344*	6th*
2026	Ducati Desmosedici GP25	M	(Italy) Michele Pirro	19																						0*	32nd*	344*	6th*

* Season still in progress.
