= David Muñoz Rodríguez =

David Muñoz Rodríguez (born 1950) is a professor and researcher with the Tec de Monterrey, Campus Monterrey, specializing in electronic communications. He has been teaching at the university level since 1971 and director of the Centro de Electrónica y Telecomunicaciones since 1992. He has published numerous peer-reviewed articles and several books. His work has been recognized by Level III membership in the Sistema Nacional de Investigadores and various awards.

== Life ==
Muñoz Rodríguez was born in Guadalajara, where he studied he bachelors at the University of Guadalajara (1973) with courses under David Mehl Blum at the Universidad Nacional Autónoma de México. He went on to receive his masters from the Instituto Politécnico Nacional (IPN) in 1976 in electronics and communications and his doctorate from the University of Essex, England in 1979.

He currently lives and works in Monterrey, Mexico.

== Career ==
Muñoz Rodríguez began his teaching career in 1971 as a professor at the Universidad Femenina de Guadalajara and the University of Guadalajara. In 1974, he became a professor at IPN. In 1979, after finishing his doctorate, he became a professor and researcher with the Centro de Investigación y Estudios Avanzados at IPN, becoming the academic coordinator of communications and chief of that same department and of the electrical engineering department.

He joined his current institution, Tec de Monterrey, Campus Monterrey in 1992, as a professor in electrical engineering and director of the Centro de Electrónica y Telecomunicaciones. In his first year, he restructured the masters program in telecommunications to get CONACYT certification. Currently he is with the post graduate division of the School of Engineering and Information Technologies at Campus Monterrey, and has directed over seventy theses and dissertations. The professor is also a member of the doctoral committees of the Centro de Investigación y de Estudios Avanzados del Instituto Politécnico Nacional and the Centro de Investigación Científica y de Educación Superior de Ensenada, Baja California.

In 2002, Muñoz Rodríguez became a member of the Cátedra de Investigación en Comunicaciones Inalámbricas y Movilidad. Since then he has secured over eight million pesos in grant funding from sources such as the Organization of American States, CONACYT, NSF/CONACYT, PEMEX, the Secretaria de Comunicaciones, Arthur D. Little, Motorola and Nortel Networks. He has also done research, consulting and other work for companies such as Motorola, Telmex, PEMEX, Arthur D. Little, Bell-Northern Research, Nortel Networks, the Secretaria de Comunicaciones y Transportes and COFETEL. This includes training and the creation of an internship program for graduate students with Bell Northern Research.

Muñoz Rodríguez has been an editor with various academic publications and has served as a judge for the Premio Nacional de las Ciencias y Artes. He states "Communication is of the essence of being human. If we do not communicate, we dehumanize; therefore it is something inherent in ourselves. For this reason I consider it important."

The researcher has received various recognitions for his teaching and research including the Premio a la Labor Docente in 1997 and the Premio a la Labor Docente e Investigación in 2006. In 1984 he was accepted to the Sistema National de Investigadores and in 1988 achieved Level III membership. In 1993 and 1999, he was named "distinguished professor in telecommunications" for his work at Bell Northern Research and Nortel Networks respectively, and received the Ericsson National Technology Prize. In 2012, he received the Rómulo Garza Prize for his career at Tec de Monterrey. Muñoz Rodríguez is also a Senior Member of Institute of Electrical and Electronics Engineers, a member of the Academia Mexicana de Ciencias since 2005 and the Academia Mexicana de Ingeniería since 2011.

Muñoz Rodríguez has published over ninety peer-reviewed articles in international journals and over fifty conference proceedings. He has published Sistemas Inalámbricas de Comunicación Personal (2002), two other books and six book chapters.

== See also ==
- List of Monterrey Institute of Technology and Higher Education faculty
