= San Carlo (company) =

Italian food company

San Carlo Gruppo Alimentare S.p.A.
- Industry: Food
- Founded: 1936; 90 years ago
- Headquarters: Milan, Italy
- Products: snack foods
- Number of employees: 3300
- Website: www.sancarlo.it/en

San Carlo Gruppo Alimentare S.p.A. (Italian for 'Saint Charles Food Group S.A.') is an Italian manufacturer of snack foods, including crisps and crackers. International brands include the Spanish brand Crecs, French brands Flodor and Gardeil, and Highlander crisps in the United Kingdom.

== History ==
Originally a rotisserie house, the Rosticceria San Carlo was established in 1936 by Francesco Vitaloni in Milan and named in honour of the nearby church of San Carlo al Lazzaretto.

Initially, his production of potato products were as accompaniments to meats and fish dishes, however, the demand for them was very high, and he began exclusive production of patatine croccanti ('crispy potato chips'), and began distributing them to the local bakeries and bars.

Francesco's son Alberto took over leadership in the 1950s.

== Products ==
Current products include potato crisps, rippled crisps, hard pretzels and pretzel sticks, dried breads and crackers and cake products, including croissants.
