= Blunt (cannabis) =

Cigar filled with cannabis, or a fat cigar

A blunt is a cigar that has been hollowed out and filled with cannabis. It is rolled with the tobacco-leaf "wrap", usually from an inexpensive cigar, or any other wrap that is not a joint paper that has glue. A blunt is different from a joint, which uses rolling papers.

Tobacco-free "blunt wraps" are available. These are made from hemp, banana leaf, palm leaf and other fibers.

== History and etymology ==
The practice originated in cities such as New York City, Philadelphia, and Baltimore. Blunts take their name from Phillies Blunt brand cigars, although any commonly available inexpensive cigar or cigarillo may be used, depending on suitability and availability. Other common synonyms for a blunt include "El-P" or "L" (from the El Producto brand), "woods" (from Backwoods), and "Dutchie" (from Dutch Masters). Backwoods, Swisher Sweets, White Owl and 4ks cigars/cigarillos are other popular brands for rolling blunts.

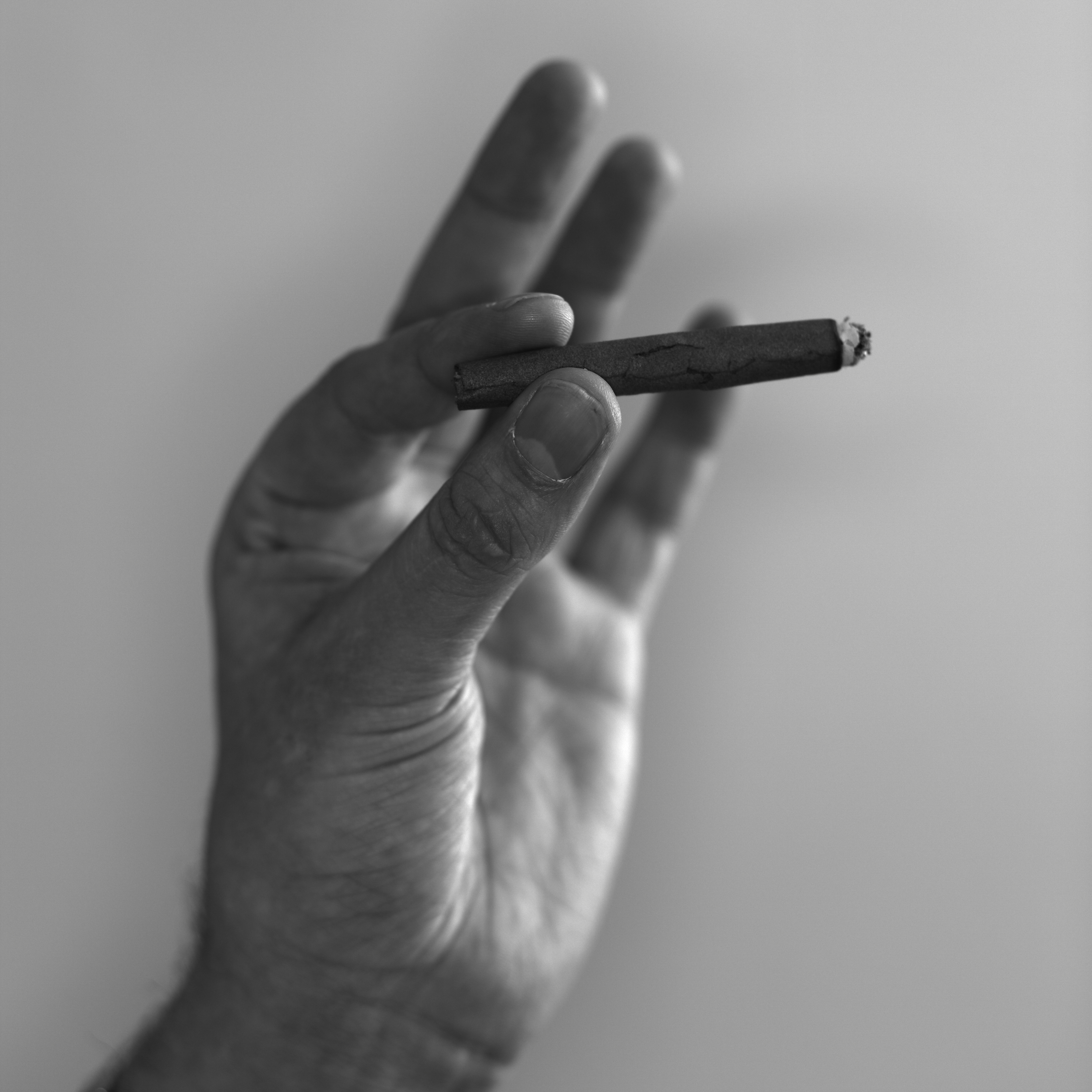
A cigarillo blunt.

The 1995 film Kids walks viewers through the step-by-step process of rolling a Philly Blunt. In 1993 at the wrap party for the film Poetic Justice, Tupac Shakur passed Snoop Dogg his blunt, which was Snoop's first experience with one. "And I’m like, 'Man, what is this?' And he said, 'That’s a blunt.' He said, 'Nigga, you ain't never had one?' I'm like, 'Nah.' He’s like, 'Lemme show you how to roll it up.'"

== Readymade blunts ==
Blunts also come as ready made tobacco wraps with hundreds of flavors in numerous brands. In addition to using cheap cigars and cigarillos to smoke cannabis, cigar wraps or "blunt wraps" are also used.

== Tobacco industry term ==
In the tobacco industry, a blunt is defined as a cigar that is wider than a cigarillo but not quite as wide as a Corona. A cigarillo that has been split and re-rolled with marijuana is still called a blunt in cannabis culture.

== Nicotine addiction ==
Due to the tobacco content in the wrapper leaf, blunts carry with them the risks of tobacco use, including nicotine addiction.

== See also ==
- Joint (cannabis)
- Cannabis consumption
- Cannabis smoking
- Smoking
