= Blunt (cigar) =

Tobacco cigar type

A blunt is a cigar which is wider than a cigarillo and not quite as wide as a corona, generally equivalent to a petit corona while short panatellas are sometimes classified as mini-blunts. These cigars typically consist of three main parts; an inner, or binder, leaf; an outer wrapper leaf rolled around the binder in a spiral; and chopped tobacco filler. In most commercially available blunts neither the binder nor wrapper is an actual tobacco leaf but made of paper composed of pressed tobacco pulp.

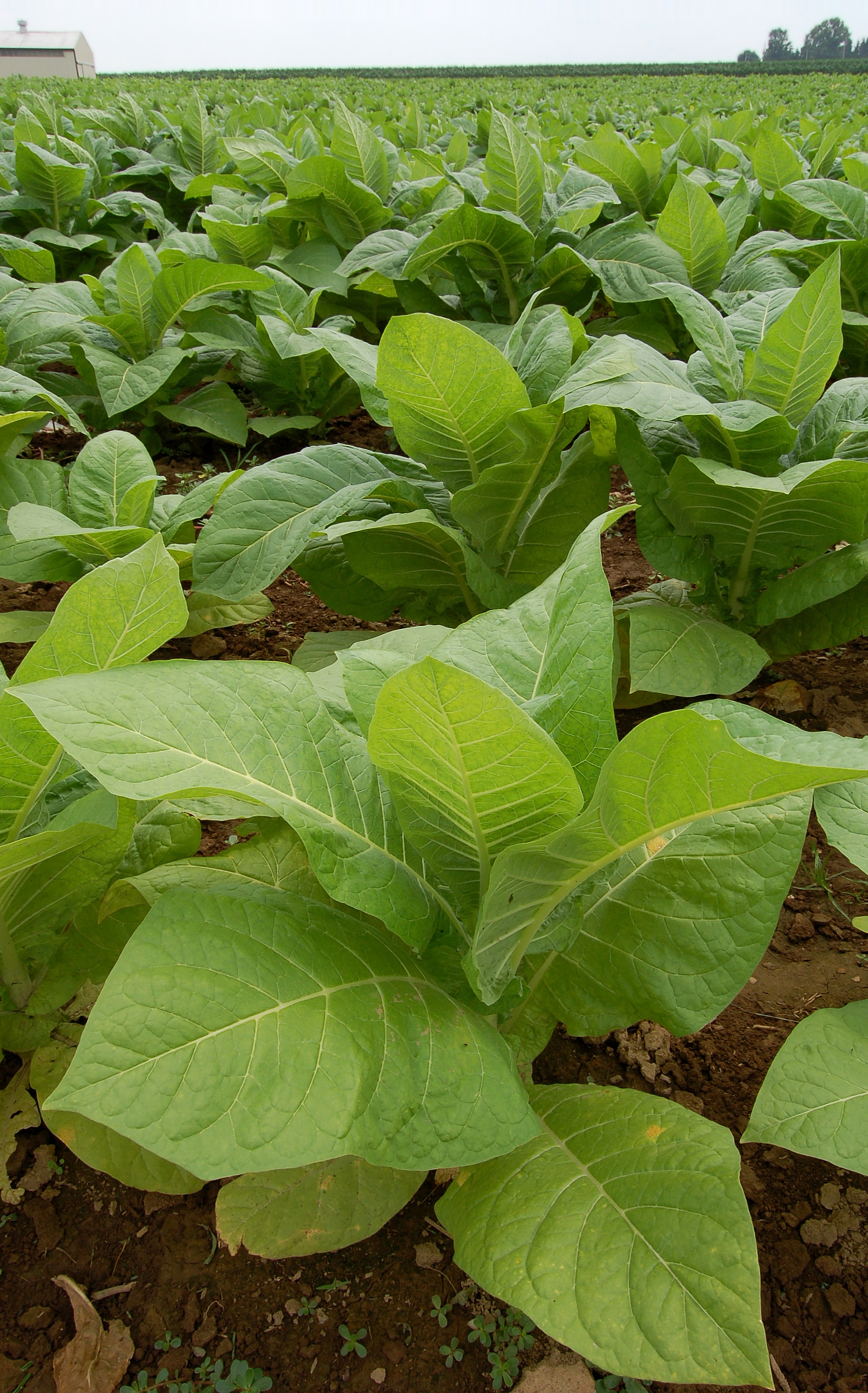
Tobacco leaves

== Description ==
Blunts originally got their name from their "broad or rounded tip", and were named as such in the 19th century to differentiate them from other cigars with a more tapered, pointed tip. Like all other cigars of the hand-rolled era, the original blunts were wrapped in a single outer tobacco leaf. The ends were folded over into a tapered rounded shape and left uncut, spurring the blunt name.

The inexpensive to produce style proved popular, and other brands of blunt appeared, including: Phillies, Dutch Masters, and White Owl. Also "Antonio Y Cleopatra", "El Producto", and "Tampa Nugget" (all sold today by Altadis), "Game" and "Garcia Y Vega" by Swedish Match, and "King Edward", "Optimo", and "Pom Pom" marketed by Swisher Sweets.

Blunts grew so ubiquitous the Phillies brand offered them in vending machines. In the 1970s a new cost saving manner of producing cigars was invented, known as spiral binding. Instead of being rolled in a continuous single leaf, inexpensive cigars were constructed out of a continuous spiral wrap produced from pressed tobacco pulp, a byproduct of tobacco leaf processing. While the basic shape of a blunt remained unchanged, the spiral wrapped cigars burned faster and more steadily.

Originally blunt on both ends, the modern cigar is cut cleanly on one and has a machine formed hole for drawing the smoke on the other. These types of cigars are commonly sold in convenience stores, gas stations, grocery stores, and drug stores, in contrast to premium cigars, which are sold in cigar shops. Blunts burn quickly like cigarettes, and some can be smoked in about five minutes, whereas depending on style, size, and a price a premium cigar can take up to an hour burn.

=== Roll-your-own ===
Individually packaged blunt leaves for rolling your own cigars have been available for many years. These are tobacco leaves that because of their nature and appearance are used to roll a cigar in one continuous sheet (thus the name blunt is used). The United States Tobacco Taxation Board has classified all individual cigar wrappers as "blunts" and taxes them as roll-your-own tobacco. Many US states classify blunt wraps as tobacco and a license is required to sell them and collect tax. Canada defines a blunt wrap as "a sheet or tube made of tobacco used to roll cigarette tobacco in—similar to rolling paper". Use of these single continuous sheets is closer to the original blunts of the 19th century since it is not a spiral wrap.

== See also ==
- Blunt (cannabis cigar)
