= Ernie Kovacs =

American comedian (1919–1962)

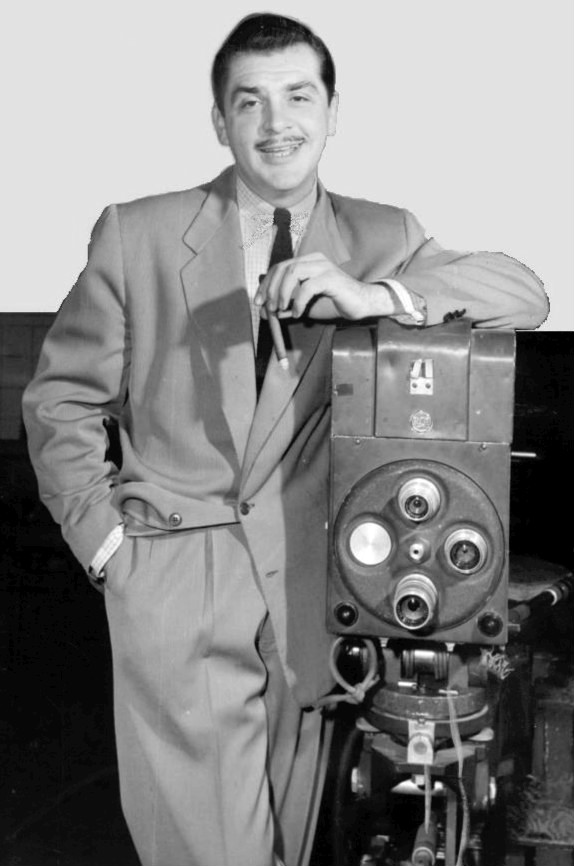
- Kovacs on the set of his television show in 1956
- Born: Ernest Edward Kovacs; January 23, 1919; Trenton, New Jersey, U.S.
- Died: January 13, 1962 (aged 42); Los Angeles, California, U.S.
- Resting place: Forest Lawn Memorial Park, Hollywood Hills
- Spouses: Bette Lee Wilcox (m. 1945; div. 1952) Edie Adams (m. 1954)
- Children: 3
- Relatives: Bill Lancaster (son-in-law)

Comedy career
- Years active: 1941–1962
- Medium: Newspaper; radio; television; magazine; cinema
- Genres: Character comedy; surreal comedy; improvisational comedy; prop comedy; spoof; sketch

Ernest Edward Kovacs (January 23, 1919 – January 13, 1962) was an American comedian, actor, and writer.

Kovacs' visually experimental and often spontaneous comedic style influenced numerous television comedy programs for years after his death. Kovacs has been credited as an influence by many individuals and shows, including Johnny Carson, Rowan and Martin's Laugh-In, Saturday Night Live, Monty Python's Flying Circus, Jim Henson, Max Headroom, Chevy Chase, Conan O'Brien, Jimmy Kimmel, Captain Kangaroo, Sesame Street, The Electric Company, Pee-wee's Playhouse, The Muppet Show, Dave Garroway, Andy Kaufman, You Can't Do That on Television, Mystery Science Theater 3000, and Uncle Floyd, among others. Chase even thanked Kovacs during his acceptance speech for his Emmy Award for Saturday Night Live.

While Kovacs and his wife, Edie Adams, received Emmy nominations for Best Performances in a Comedy Series during 1957, his talent was not fully appreciated until after his death. The 1962 Emmy for Outstanding Electronic Camera Work and the Directors Guild of America award came a short time after his fatal accident. A quarter century later, he was inducted into the Academy of Television Arts & Sciences Hall of Fame. Kovacs also has a star on the Hollywood Walk of Fame for his work in television. In 1986, the Museum of Broadcasting (later to become the Museum of Television & Radio and now the Paley Center for Media) presented an exhibit of Kovacs's work, called The Vision of Ernie Kovacs. Television critic William A. Henry III wrote for the museum's booklet: "Kovacs was more than another wide-eyed, self-ingratiating clown. He was television's first significant video artist."

== Early life and career ==
Ernest Kovacs was born in 1919. His father, Andrew John Kovacs emigrated from Tornaújfalu, Hungary, which is now known as Turnianska Nová Ves, Slovakia. Andrew sailed on the S.S. Würzburg via Bremen, arriving at Ellis Island on February 8, 1906, at age 16. He worked as a policeman, restaurateur, and bootlegger, the last so successfully that he moved his wife, Mary; son, Tom; and Tom’s half-brother, Ernest Edward Kovacs into a 20-room mansion in the best part of Trenton.

Though a poor student, Kovacs was influenced by a Trenton Central High School drama teacher, Harold Van Kirk, and received an acting scholarship to the American Academy of Dramatic Arts in 1937 with Van Kirk's help, appearing with Long Island, New York, stock companies. The end of Prohibition and the onset of the Great Depression resulted in difficult financial times for the family. When Kovacs began drama school, all he could afford was a fifth-floor walk-up apartment on West 74th Street in New York City.

During this time, he watched many Grade B" movies; admission was only 10 cents. Many of these movies influenced his comedy routines later.

A 1938 local newspaper photograph shows Kovacs as a member of the Prospect Players, not yet wearing his trademark mustache. Kovacs used his class vacation time to pursue roles in summer stock companies. While working in Vermont in 1939, he became so seriously ill with pneumonia and pleurisy that his doctors didn't expect him to survive. During the next year and a half, his comedic talents developed as he entertained both doctors and patients with his antics during stays at several hospitals. While hospitalized, Kovacs developed a lifelong love of classical music by the gift of a radio, which he kept tuned to WQXR. By the time he was released his parents had separated, and Kovacs went back to Trenton, living with his mother in a two-room apartment over a store. He began work as a cigar salesman, which resulted in a lifelong tobacco-smoking habit.

Kovacs's first paid entertainment work was during 1941 as an announcer for Trenton's radio station WTTM. He spent the next nine years with WTTM, becoming the station's director of special events; in this job he did things like trying to see what it was like to be run over by a train (leaving the tracks at the last minute) and broadcasting from the cockpit of a plane for which he took flying lessons. Kovacs was also involved with local theater; a local newspaper published a photograph of him and the news that he was doing some directing for the Trenton Players Guild in early 1941. The Trentonian, a local daily newspaper, offered Kovacs a column in June 1945; he named it "Kovacs Unlimited" (1945–50).

== Start in television ==
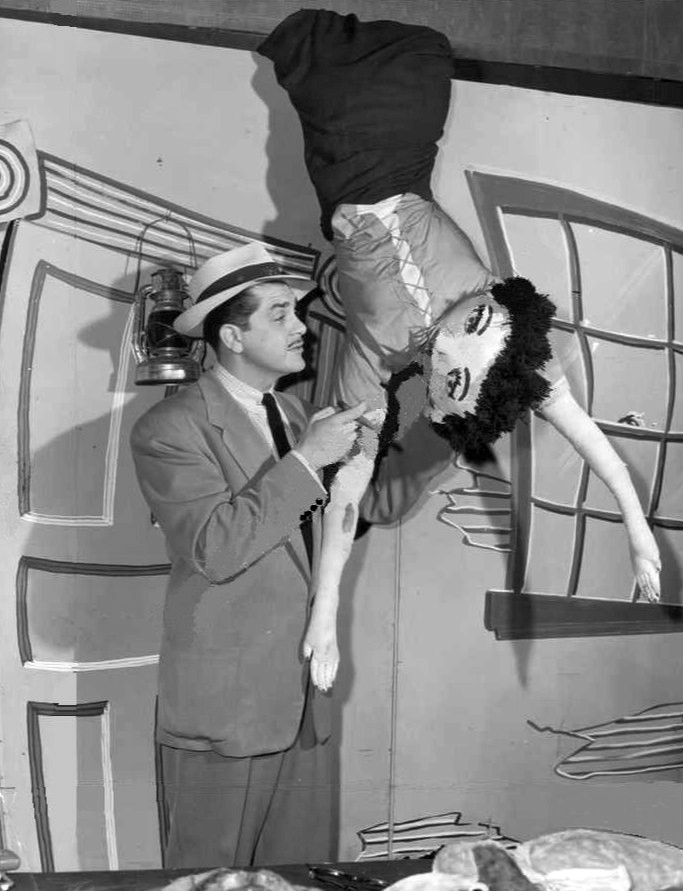
Kovacs on Three to Get Ready in 1951 with Gertrude, who was donated after Kovacs asked his viewers to bring things they no longer wanted to the WPTZ-TV lobby.

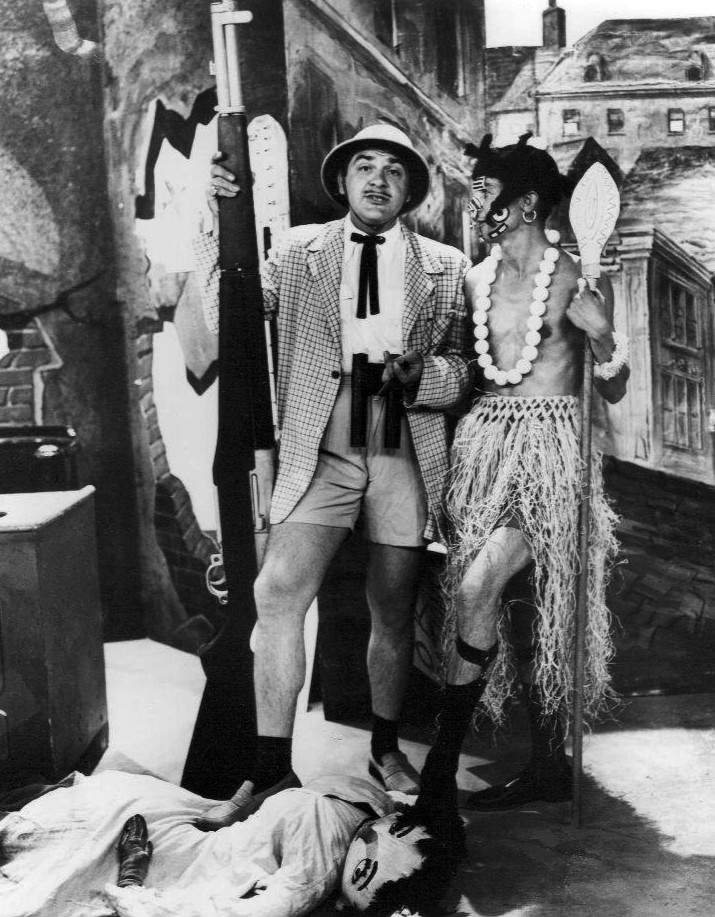
Kovacs with close associate Andy McKay (wearing a mask made of masking tape), who relocated to New York with Kovacs (and Gertrude) in 1952.

In January 1950, arriving at NBC's Philadelphia affiliate, WPTZ, for an audition, wearing a barrel and shorts, got Kovacs his first television job. His first show was Pick Your Ideal, a fashion and promotional program for the Ideal Manufacturing Company. Before long, Kovacs was also the host of Deadline For Dinner and Now You're Cooking, shows featuring advice from local chefs. (Note: Now KYW-TV; though the current NBC affiliate is WCAU-TV) When Kovacs's guest chef did not arrive in time for the show, he offered a recipe for "Eggs Scavok" (Kovacs spelled backward). Kovacs seasoned the egg dish with ashes from his cigar. The sponsor was a local propane company. Hosting these shows soon resulted in his becoming host of a program named Three to Get Ready, named for WPTZ's channel 3 spot on television dials.

Premiering in November 1950, Three to Get Ready was innovative because it was the first regularly scheduled early morning (7–9am) show in a major television market, predating NBC's Today by more than a year. Prior to this, it had been assumed that few people would watch television at such an early hour. While the show was advertised as early morning news and weather, Kovacs provided this and more in an original manner. When rain was in the weather forecast, Kovacs would get on a ladder and pour water down on the staff member reading the report. Goats were auditioned for a local theater performance and tiny women appeared to walk up his arm. Kovacs also went outside of the studio for some of his skits, running through a downtown Philadelphia restaurant in a gorilla suit in one; in another, he looked into a construction pit, saying it was deep enough to see to China, when a man in Chinese clothing popped up, said a few words in the language, and ran off. Despite its popularity, the weekly prop budget for the show was just $15. Kovacs once asked his viewers to send unwanted items to Channel 3, and the station's lobby was soon filled with items.

The only character no one ever saw inspired more gifts; he was Howard, the World's Strongest Ant. From the time of his WPTZ debut, Howard received more than 30,000 miniaturized gifts from Kovacs's viewers, including a tiny, mink-lined swimming pool. Kovacs began his Early Eyeball Fraternal & Marching Society (EEFMS) while doing Three to Get Ready. There were membership cards with by-laws and ties; the password was a favorite phrase of Kovacs's: "It's Been Real". Kovacs continued the EEFMS on his morning show when he moved to WCBS in New York in 1952. The success of Three to Get Ready proved that people did indeed watch early-morning television, and it was one of the factors that caused NBC to create The Today Show. WPTZ did not begin broadcasting Today when it premiered on January 14, 1952; network influence caused the station to end Three to Get Ready at the end of March of that year.

During early 1952, Kovacs was also doing a late morning show for WPTZ named Kovacs on the Corner. Kovacs would walk through an imaginary neighborhood, talking with various characters such as Pete the Cop and Luigi the Barber. As with Three to Get Ready, there were some special segments. "Swap Time" was one of them: Viewers could bring their unwanted items to the WPTZ studios to trade them live on the air with Kovacs. The show made its debut on January 4, 1952, with Kovacs losing creative control of the program soon after it was begun. Kovacs on the Corner was short-lived; it ended on March 28, 1952, along with Three to Get Ready. Kovacs then began work for WCBS-TV in New York with a local morning show and a later network one. Both programs were cancelled; Kovacs lost the local morning program for the same reason as Three to Get Ready—the broadcasting time was confiscated by the station's network in 1954.

== Visual humor and characters ==
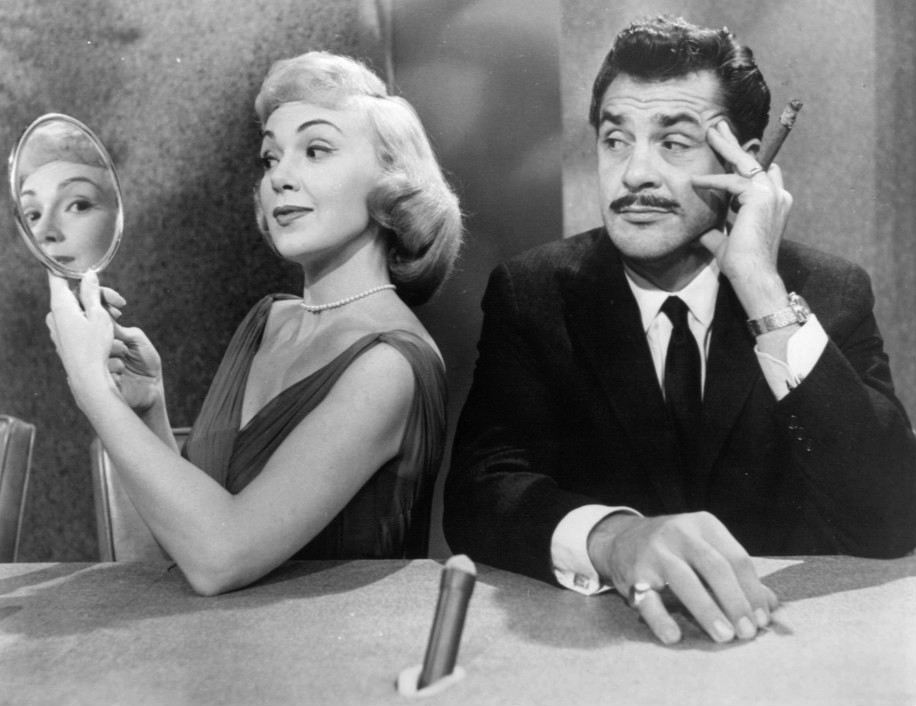
With wife Edie Adams in the television series Take a Good Look

At WPTZ, Kovacs began using the ad-libbed and experimental style that would become his reputation, including video effects, superimpositions, reverse polarities and scanning, and quick blackouts. He was also noted for abstraction and carefully timed non-sequitur gags and for allowing the fourth wall to be breached. Kovacs's cameras commonly showed his viewers activity beyond the boundaries of the show set—including crew members and outside the studio itself. Kovacs also liked talking to the off-camera crew and even introduced segments from the studio control room. He frequently made use of accidents and happenstance, incorporating the unexpected into his shows. In one of Kovacs's Philadelphia broadcasts, Oscar Liebetrau, an elderly crew member who was known for often sleeping for the duration of the telecast, was introduced to the audience as "Sleeping Schwartz." Kovacs was once knocked unconscious when a pie smashed into his face still had the plate under it.

Kovacs's love of spontaneity extended to his crew, who would occasionally play on-air pranks on him to see how he would react. During one of his NBC shows, Kovacs was appearing as the inept magician Matzoh Hepplewhite. The sketch called for the magician to frequently hit a gong, which was the signal for a sexy female assistant to bring out a bottle and shot glass for a quick swig of alcohol. Stagehands substituted real liquor for the iced tea normally used for the skit. Kovacs realized that he would be called upon to drink a shot of liquor for each successive gong. He pressed on with the sketch and was quite inebriated by the end of the show.

Kovacs helped develop camera tricks still common decades after his death. His character Eugene sat at a table to eat his lunch, but as he removed items one at a time from a lunch box, he watched them inexplicably roll down the table into the lap of a man reading a newspaper at the other end. When Kovacs poured milk from a thermos bottle, the stream flowed in a seemingly unusual direction. Never seen on television before, the secret was using a tilted set in front of a camera tilted at the same angle.

Barbara Loden and Kovacs positioned in front of two television cameras for illusion.

He constantly sought new techniques and used both primitive and improvised ways of creating visual effects that would later be done electronically. One innovative construction involved attaching a kaleidoscope made from a toilet-paper roll to a camera lens with cardboard and tape and setting the resulting abstract images to music. Another was a soup can with both ends removed fitted with angled mirrors. Used on a camera and turning it could put Kovacs seemingly on the ceiling. An underwater stunt involved cigar smoker Kovacs sitting in an easy chair, reading his newspaper and somehow smoking a cigar. Removing it from his mouth, Kovacs was able to exhale a puff of white smoke, all while floating underwater. The trick: the "smoke" was a small amount of milk which he filled his mouth with before submerging. Kovacs repeated the effect for a Dutch Masters television commercial on his ABC game show, Take A Good Look.

Kovacs appears to look through Loden's head.

One of the special effects he employed made it appear as if he was able to look through his assistant Barbara Loden's head. The illusion was performed by placing a black patch on Loden's head and standing her against a black background while one studio camera was trained on her. A second one photographed Kovacs, who used the studio monitor to position himself exactly so that his eye would appear to be looking through a hole in her head.

He also developed such routines as an all-gorilla version of Swan Lake, a poker game set to Beethoven's Fifth Symphony, the skit Silent Show, in which Eugene interacts with the world accompanied solely by music and sound effects, parodies of typical television commercials and movie genres, and various musical segments with everyday items (such as kitchen appliances or office equipment) moving in sync to music. A popular recurring skit was The Nairobi Trio, three derby-hatted apes (Kovacs and his wife, Edie Adams, in gorilla suits; and frequently, the third ape was Kovacs's best friend Jack Lemmon) miming mechanically and rhythmically to the tune of Robert Maxwell's "Solfeggio".

Kovacs used extended sketches and mood pieces or quick blackout gags lasting only seconds. Some could be expensive, such as his famous used-car salesman routine with a jalopy and a breakaway floor: it cost $12,000 to produce the six-second gag. He was one of the first television comedians to use odd fake credits and comments between the legitimate credits and, at times, during his routines.

Kovacs reportedly disliked working in front of a live audience, as was the case with the shows he did for NBC during the 1950s. He found the presence of an audience distracting, and those in the seats frequently did not understand some of the more elaborate visual gags and special effects, which could only be appreciated by watching studio monitors instead of the stage.

Like many comedians of the era, Kovacs created a rotation of recurring roles. In addition to the silent "Eugene," his most familiar characters were the fey, lisping poet Percy Dovetonsils, and the heavily accented German radio announcer, Wolfgang von Sauerbraten. His character Mr. Question Man, who answered viewer queries, was a satire on the long-run (1937–56) radio series, The Answer Man. Others included horror show host Auntie Gruesome, bumbling magician Matzoh Hepplewhite, Frenchman Pierre Ragout, and sardonic Hungarian cooking-show host Miklos Molnar. The Miklos character wasn't always confined to a kitchen; Kovacs performed a parody of The Howdy Doody Show with "Buffalo Miklos" as the host. Poet Percy Dovetonsils can be found playing Beethoven's Moonlight Sonata on a disappearing piano and as a "Master Detective" on the "Private Eye-Private Eye" presentation of the US Steel Hour on CBS March 8, 1961. On the same show, the Nairobi Trio abandons its instruments for a safe-cracking job; still with a background of "Solfeggio", but speaking, two of the three appear in an "Outer Space" sketch.

Kovacs became a regular on NBC Radio's radio magazine program Monitor beginning during late 1958, often using his Mr. Question Man character in his radio monologues.

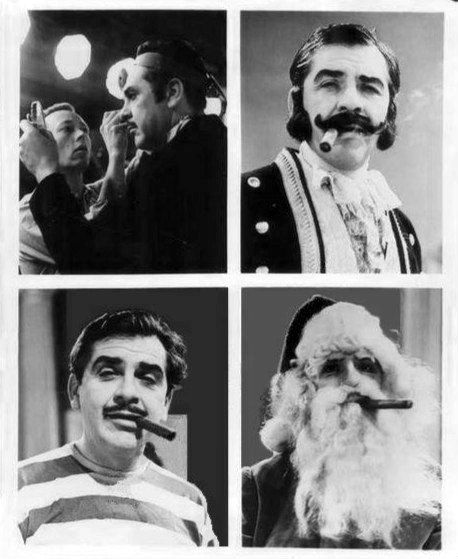
Kovacs being made up (upper left) for the U.S. Steel Hour "Private Eye-Private Eye" (1961) in which he played many of his usual characters as well as a butler (upper r), a skin diver (lower l), and Santa Claus.

Kovacs never hesitated to lampoon those considered institutions of radio and television. In April 1954, he started a late-night talk show, The Ernie Kovacs Show, on DuMont Television Network's New York flagship station, WABD. Stage, screen and radio notables were often guests. Archie Bleyer, head of Cadence Records, came to chat one evening. Bleyer had been the long-time orchestra director for Arthur Godfrey's radio and television shows. He had been dismissed by Godfrey the year before, together with fellow cast member, singer Julius La Rosa. In La Rosa's case, he hired a manager, defying an unwritten Godfrey policy. With Bleyer, Godfrey was angered when he learned Bleyer's record company Cadence Records had produced spoken-word material by Don McNeill, host of ABC's Don McNeill's Breakfast Club, which Godfrey considered competition to his show. Bleyer and Kovacs were shown in split screen, with Kovacs wearing a red wig, headphones, and playing a ukulele in a Godfrey imitation, while talking with his guest.

Kovacs's television programs included Three to Get Ready (an early morning program seen on Philadelphia's WPTZ from 1950 through 1952), It's Time for Ernie (1951, his first network series), Ernie in Kovacsland, (a summer replacement show for Kukla, Fran and Ollie, 1951), The Ernie Kovacs Show (1952–56 on various networks), and game shows Gamble on Love, One Minute Please, Time Will Tell (all on DuMont), and Take a Good Look (1959–61). Kovacs was also the host of a program, Silents Please, which showed silent movies on network television, with serious discussion about the movies and their actors.

During the summer of 1957, Kovacs was a celebrity panelist on the television series What's My Line?, appearing in 10 of the season's 13 episodes. He took his responsibilities less than seriously, often eschewing a legitimate question for the sake of a laugh. An example: Industrialist Henry J. Kaiser, the founder of an automobile company, was the program's "mystery guest." Previous questioning had established that the mystery guest's name was synonymous with an automobile brand, Kovacs asked, "Are you – and this is just a wild guess – but are you Abraham Lincoln?"—a reference to the Ford Motor Company's Lincoln automobiles. Kovacs gave an interview admitting that he was absent from the show when he wanted to go out for dinner on a Sunday, leading the reporter to offer that as the reason for Kovacs leaving the series. Actually, Kovacs's participation ended because his contract was up—the summer season was over. Goodson and Todman valued Kovacs's presence in the summer series and kept him on as a guest panelist. According to What's My Line? producer Gil Fates, "We offered him a contract and a permanent place on the panel but, wisely, Ernie didn't want to tie himself down [to New York] at that point in a burgeoning career. He did his last show with us in November of that year, then went to California to work and live."

== Tonight Show ==
From October 1956 until January 1957, Kovacs hosted his own version of the Tonight show on Monday and Tuesday nights, relieving Steve Allen, who continued to host Tonight Starring Steve Allen the rest of the week. Tonight Starring Ernie Kovacs featured Bill Wendell as Kovacs' announcer and LeRoy Holmes as his bandleader. Kovacs declined an offer by NBC to take over The Tonight Show full time after Allen left in 1957 because of the amount of work involved in producing Kovacs's version of the program.

== TV specials ==
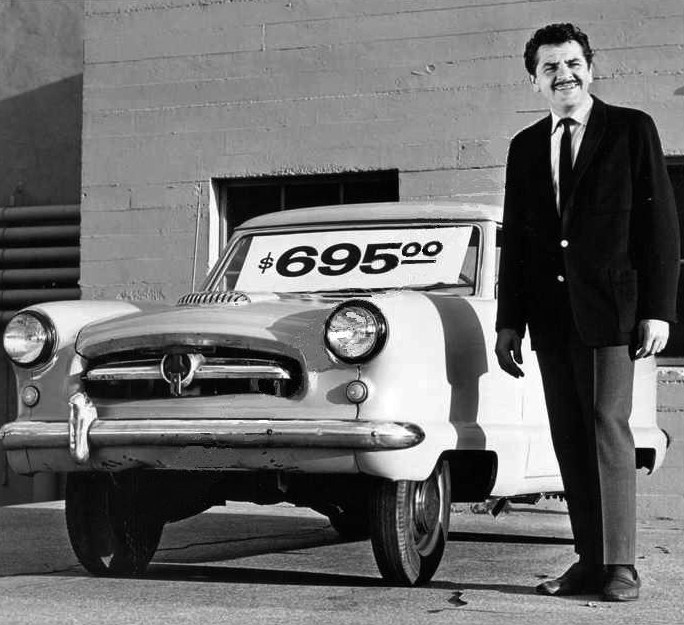
Kovacs slapped the hood of this Nash Metropolitan car, sending it down into a hole in the ground, circa 1960–1961. Reportedly, the cost to produce this one quick blackout used the entire budget for his half-hour television show.

He also did several television specials, including the famous Silent Show (1957), featuring his character, Eugene: the first all-pantomime prime-time network program. After the end of the Dean Martin-Jerry Lewis partnership, NBC offered Lewis the opportunity to host his own 90-minute color television special. Lewis opted to use only 60 minutes, leaving the network 30 minutes to fill; no one wanted this time slot, but Kovacs was willing to have it. The program contained no spoken dialogue and contained only sound effects and music. Featuring Kovacs as the mute, Charlie Chaplin-like character "Eugene", the program contained surreal sight gags. Kovacs developed the Eugene character during the autumn of 1956, when hosting the television series The Tonight Show. Expectations were high for the Lewis program, but it was Kovacs's special that received the most attention; Kovacs received his first movie offer, had a cover story in Life magazine, and received the Sylvania Award that year. In 1961, Kovacs and his co-director, Joe Behar, were recipients of the Directors Guild of America Award for a second version of this program broadcast by the American Broadcasting Company network.

A series of monthly half-hour specials for ABC during 1961–62 is often considered his best television work. Produced on videotape using new editing and special effects techniques, it won a 1962 Emmy Award. Kovacs and co-director Behar also won the Directors Guild of America award for an Ernie Kovacs Special based on the earlier, silent "Eugene" program. Kovacs's last ABC special was broadcast posthumously, on January 23, 1962.

The Dutch Masters cigar company became well-known during the late 1950s and early 1960s for its sponsorship of various television projects of Ernie Kovacs. The company allowed Kovacs total creative control in the creation of their television commercials for his programs and specials. He produced a series of non-speaking television commercials for Dutch Masters during the run of his television series Take A Good Look which was praised by both television critics and viewers. (Note: During 1960, the trade journal Advertising Age termed Kovacs "one of the TV commercial's best public relations experts right now". Shortly before his death, Kovacs was negotiating with Colgate-Palmolive to produce silent commercials for the company's products. After Kovacs's death, the trade magazine Printers' Ink wrote that Kovacs's silent Dutch Masters commercials proved that creativity can be compatible with commercialism and that pioneering with regard to sponsorship can pay.)

While praised by critics, Kovacs rarely had a highly rated show. The Museum of Broadcast Communications says, "It is doubtful that Ernie Kovacs would find a place on television today. He was too zany, too unrestrained, too undisciplined. Perhaps Jack Gould of The New York Times said it best for Ernie Kovacs: 'The fun was in trying'."

Other shows had greater success while using elements of Kovacs's style. George Schlatter, producer of the later television series Rowan & Martin's Laugh-In, was married to actress Jolene Brand, who had appeared in Kovacs's comic troupes over the years and had been a frequent participant in his pioneering sketches. Laugh-In made frequent use of the quick blackout gags and surreal humor that marked many Kovacs projects. Another link was a young NBC staffer, Bill Wendell, Kovacs's usual announcer and sometimes a sketch participant. From 1980 to 1995, Wendell was the announcer for David Letterman.

== The Music Man ==
Kovacs was also known for his eclectic musical taste. His main theme song was named "Oriental Blues" by Jack Newton. The rendition most often heard was a piano-driven trio version, but, for his primetime show during 1956, music director Harry Sosnik presented a full-blown big-band version. The German song "Die Moritat von Mackie Messer" from The Threepenny Opera (anglicized to "Mack the Knife"), frequently underscored his blackout routines.

Kovacs was introduced to harpist-songwriter Robert Maxwell's recent instrumental "Solfeggio" in 1954 by Barry Shear, his director at DuMont Television Network. In the 1982 TV special Ernie Kovacs: Television's Original Genius, Edie Adams recalled that when Kovacs first heard "Solfeggio", he immediately knew how he wanted to use it. He conceived of three music-box-like apes in costume, who moved in time to the tune, and christened them The Nairobi Trio. Maxwell's 1953 record of "Solfeggio" became so identified with the ape act that the record was re-released in 1957 as "Song of the Nairobi Trio."

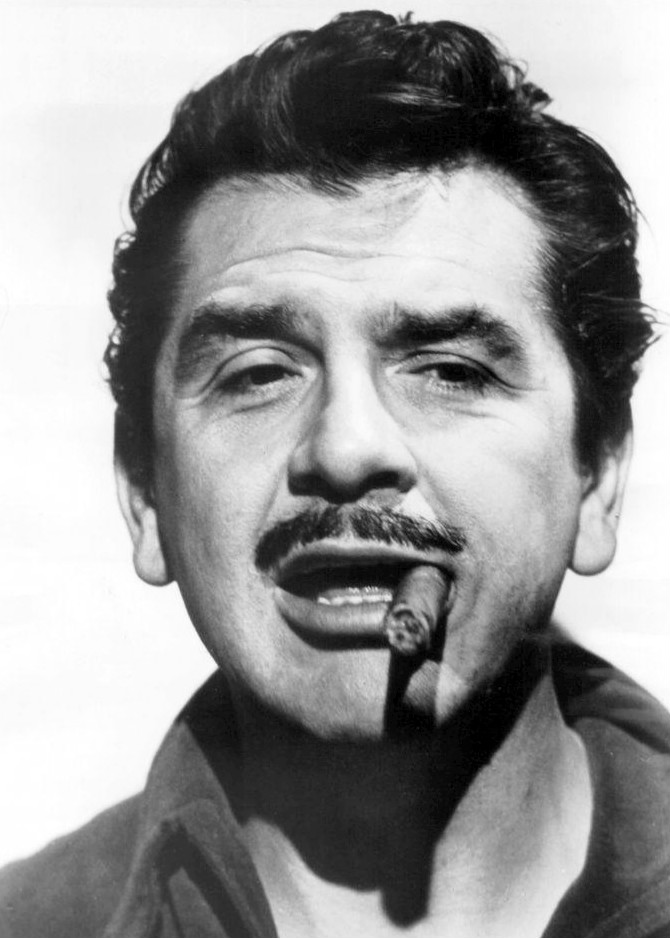
Kovacs in 1961

Kovacs matched an unusual treatment of "Sentimental Journey", by Mexican bandleader Juan García Esquivel, to video of an empty office in which various items (pencil sharpeners, water coolers, wall clocks) come to life in rhythm with the music; it was a variation on several famous animations of a decade earlier. The original three-minute presentation was outlined by Kovacs in a four-page, single-spaced memo to his staff. The perfectionist Kovacs describes in minute detail what had to be done and how to do it. The memo ends with this: "I don't know how the hell you're going to get this done by Sunday – but 'rots of ruck." (signed) "Ernie (with love)". Kovacs also made careful use of the shrill singer Leona Anderson—who had somewhat less than a classical voice, by some estimations—in comic vignettes.

Kovacs used classical music as background for silent skits or abstract visual routines, including "Concerto for Orchestra", by Béla Bartók; music from the opera "The Love of Three Oranges", by Sergei Prokofiev; the finale of Igor Stravinsky's suite "The Firebird"; and Richard Strauss's "Till Eulenspiegel's Merry Pranks"; and, from George Gershwin, "Rialto Ripples"—the theme to his shows—as well as parts of Gershwin's "Concerto in F". He may have been known best for using Joseph Haydn's "String Quartet, Opus 3, Number 5" (the "Serenade," actually composed by Roman Hoffstetter) for a series of 1960–61 commercials he created and videotaped for his sponsor, Dutch Masters.

For the show of May 22, 1959, Kovacs on Music, Kovacs began by saying, "I have never really understood classical music, so I would like to take this opportunity to explain it to others." He presented a gorilla version of Swan Lake which differed from the usual performance only in the persona of the dancers, along with giant paper clips moving to music and other sketches.

He also served as host on a jazz album to benefit the American Cancer Society in 1957, Listening to Jazz with Ernie Kovacs. It was a 15-minute recording featuring prominent musicians including pianist Jimmy Yancey, trumpeter Bunk Johnson, soprano saxophonist Sidney Bechet, guitarist Django Reinhardt, composer/pianist/bandleader Duke Ellington and longtime Ellington trumpeter Cootie Williams. Both the Library of Congress and the National Library of Canada have copies of this recording in their collections.

== Works ==
Kovacs wrote a novel, Zoomar: A Sophisticated Novel about Love and TV (Doubleday, 1957), based on television pioneer Pat Weaver. He was said to have written the novel in 13 days to write. The book took its title from the Zoomar brand zoom lenses frequently used on television cameras at the time. In a 1960 interview, Edie Adams related that the novel was written after Kovacs's experiences with network television while he was preparing to broadcast the Silent Show. The 1961 British edition was retitled T.V. Medium Rare by its London-based publisher, Transworld.

While he worked on several other book projects, Kovacs's only other published title was How to Talk at Gin, published posthumously in 1962. He intended part of the book's proceeds to benefit Cedars-Sinai Medical Center.

During 1955–58, he wrote for Mad (his favorite humor magazine), including the feature "Strangely Believe It!" (a parody of Ripley's Believe It or Not! that was a regular feature of his television shows) and Gringo, a board game with ridiculously complicated rules that was renamed Droongo for the television show. Kovacs also wrote the introduction to the 1958 collection Mad For Keeps: A Collection of the Best from Mad Magazine.

== Television guest star ==
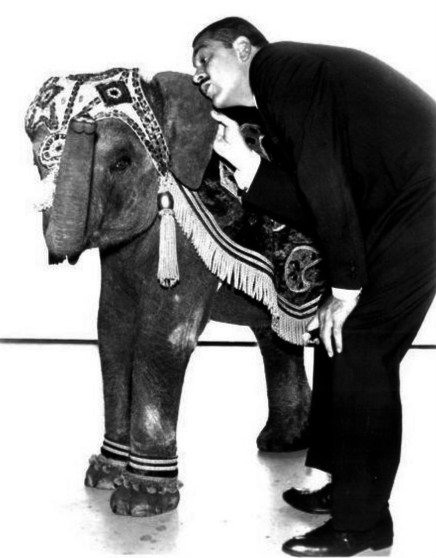
Kovacs as Barney Colby, the super detective, 1959

Kovacs and Edie Adams guest starred on what turned out to be the final episode of The Lucille Ball-Desi Arnaz Show, (syndicated as The Lucy–Desi Comedy Hour or We Love Lucy) "Lucy Meets the Moustache", which was in rehearsals during the week of February 28 and filmed on March 3 for an April 1, 1960 network broadcast. "Lucy Meets the Moustache" was the last time Arnaz and Ball worked together and the last time their famous characters appeared in a first-run broadcast. According to Adams, Ball and Arnaz 'avoided contact and barely talked to each other in rehearsals and in-between scenes'. Adams also said that they were not told their episode was the last or that the famous couple was to divorce (Ball entered the uncontested divorce request March 4, 1960).

Kovacs also appeared in roles on other television programs. For General Electric Theater's "I Was a Bloodhound" in 1959, Kovacs played the role of detective Barney Colby, whose extraordinary sense of smell helped him solve many seemingly-impossible cases. Colby was hired by a foreign country to recover its symbol of royalty, a baby elephant, who was being held for ransom.

== Films ==
Kovacs found Hollywood success as a character actor, often typecast as a swarthy military officer (almost always a "Captain" of some sort) in such films as Operation Mad Ball, Wake Me When It's Over and Our Man in Havana. While working in his first film role for Operation Mad Ball, Kovacs was filming a wild party scene after midnight; it was decided to use real champagne for realism. After a few hours of work, someone came up to Kovacs and remarked that he had been having quite a good time chasing starlets all night. Kovacs told the stranger to go to hell, since he was following the script; he later learned the stranger was Harry Cohn, head of Columbia Pictures. Kovacs and Cohn later became friends despite the way they had met, with Cohn giving Kovacs roles in Bell, Book and Candle (1958) and It Happened to Jane (1959).

He garnered critical acclaim for film roles such as the perennially inebriated writer in Bell, Book and Candle and as the cartoonishly-evil head of a railroad company (who resembled Orson Welles's title character in Citizen Kane) in It Happened to Jane, where he had his head shaved and his remaining hair dyed grey for the role. In 1960, he played the base commander Charlie Stark in the comedy Wake Me When It's Over and the con man Frankie Cannon trying to steal John Wayne's gold mine in the western comedy North to Alaska. His own personal favorite was said to have been the offbeat Five Golden Hours (1961), in which he portrayed a larcenous professional mourner who meets his match in a professional widow played by Cyd Charisse. Kovacs's last movie, Sail a Crooked Ship (also 1961), was released one month before his death.

== Personal life ==
=== First marriage ===
Kovacs and his first wife, Bette Wilcox, were married on August 13, 1945. When the marriage ended, he fought for custody of their children. The court awarded Kovacs full custody upon determining that his former wife was mentally unstable. The decision was extremely unusual at the time, setting a legal precedent. Wilcox subsequently kidnapped the children, taking them to Florida. After a long and expensive search, Kovacs regained custody. These events were portrayed in the television movie Ernie Kovacs: Between the Laughter (1984), which garnered an Emmy Award nomination for its writer, April Smith. Kovacs was portrayed by Jeff Goldblum.

Kovacs's first wife made a legal attempt to gain custody of her two daughters soon after his death. She began August 2, 1962, by claiming US$500,000 (equivalent to $5.3 million in 2025) was her share of Kovacs's estate and charging that her ex-husband had abducted the girls in 1955; Kovacs had been granted legal custody of his daughters in 1952. On August 30, Wilcox filed an affidavit claiming that Kovacs's widow, Edie Adams, the stepmother to the girls, was "unfit" to care for them. Both daughters, Bette and Kippie, testified that they wanted to stay with their stepmother, Edie. Kippie's testimony was very emotional; in it she referred to Edie as "Mommy" and her birth mother as "the other lady." Upon hearing the verdict that the girls would remain in their home, Adams wept, saying, "This is what Ernie would have wanted. Now I can smile." Bette's reaction was "I'm so happy I can hardly express myself", after learning she and her sister would not be forced to leave Edie.

=== Second marriage ===
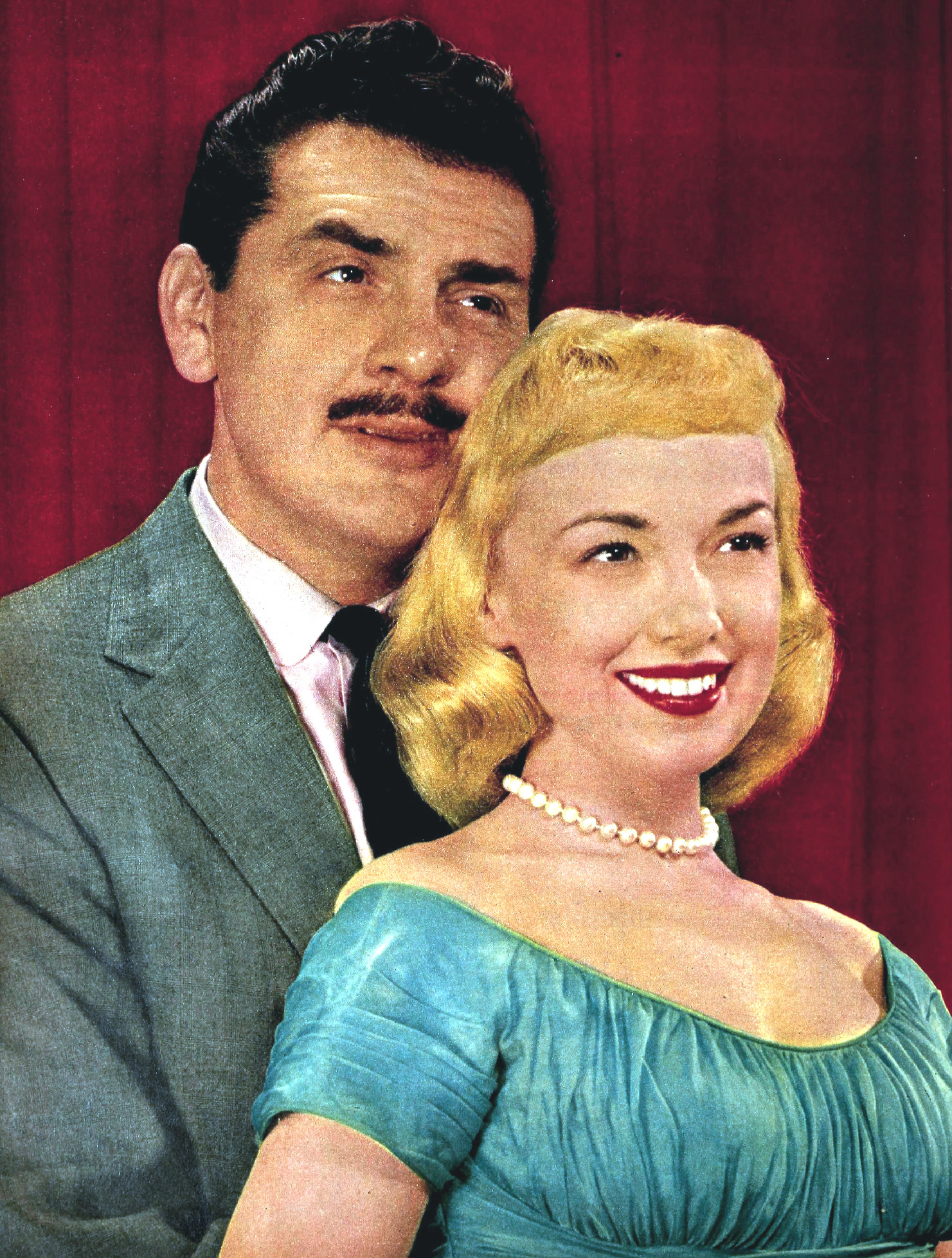
Kovacs and second wife, Edie Adams, in 1956

Kovacs and Adams met in 1951 when she was hired to work for his WPTZ show, Three to Get Ready. Her appearance on Arthur Godfrey's Talent Scouts caught the eye of Kovacs's producer, and he asked her to audition for the program. A classically trained singer, she was able to perform only three popular songs. Edie said later, "I sang them all during the audition, and if they had asked to hear another, I never would have made it." Quoting Kovacs, "I wish I could say I was the big shot that hired her, but it was my show in name only – the producer had all the say. Later on I did have something to say and I said it: 'Let's get married.'"

After the couple's first date, Kovacs proceeded to buy a Jaguar car, telling Adams he wanted to take her out in style. He was seriously taken with the beautiful and talented young woman, courting her with imagination and flair. Kovacs's attempts to win Adams's affection included hiring a mariachi band to serenade her backstage at the Broadway musical she was performing in and the sudden gift of a diamond engagement ring, telling her to wear it until she made up her mind. Kovacs continued this romantic quest after the show went out of town.

Adams booked a six-week European cruise, which she hoped would let her make up her mind whether or not to marry Kovacs. After only three days away and many long-distance telephone calls, she curtailed her trip and returned to say "yes". They eloped and were married on September 12, 1954, in Mexico City. The ceremony was presided over by former New York City mayor William O'Dwyer and was performed in Spanish, which neither Kovacs nor Adams understood; O'Dwyer had to prompt each of them to say "Sí" at the "I do" portion of the vows. Adams, who had a middle-class upbringing, was smitten by Kovacs's quirky ways; the couple remained together until his death. (She later said about Kovacs, "He treated me like a little girl, and I loved it—Women's Lib be damned!")

Adams also aided Kovacs's struggle to reclaim his two older children after the kidnapping by their mother. She also was a regular partner on his television shows. Kovacs usually introduced or addressed her in a businesslike way, as "Edith Adams". Adams was usually willing to do anything he envisioned, whether it was singing seriously, performing impersonations (including a well-regarded impression of Marilyn Monroe) or taking a pie in the face or a pratfall if and when needed. The couple had one daughter, Mia Susan Kovacs, born June 20, 1959. Mia died in a car crash in 1982, at age 22.

Kovacs and his family shared a 16-room apartment in Manhattan on Central Park West that seemed perfect until he went to California for his first film role in Operation Mad Ball. The experience of the totally different, laid-back lifestyle of Hollywood made a big impression on him. He realized he was working too much in New York; in California he would be able to work fewer hours, do just as well or better and have more time for Edie and his daughters. He was working most of the time then and sleeping about two or three hours a night. Kovacs claimed that he realized it was time for a change when he was telling his girls a bedtime story and found himself thinking of using it for a show instead. Kovacs relocated his family there in 1957, after Edie finished work for the Broadway play Li'l Abner.

== Death ==
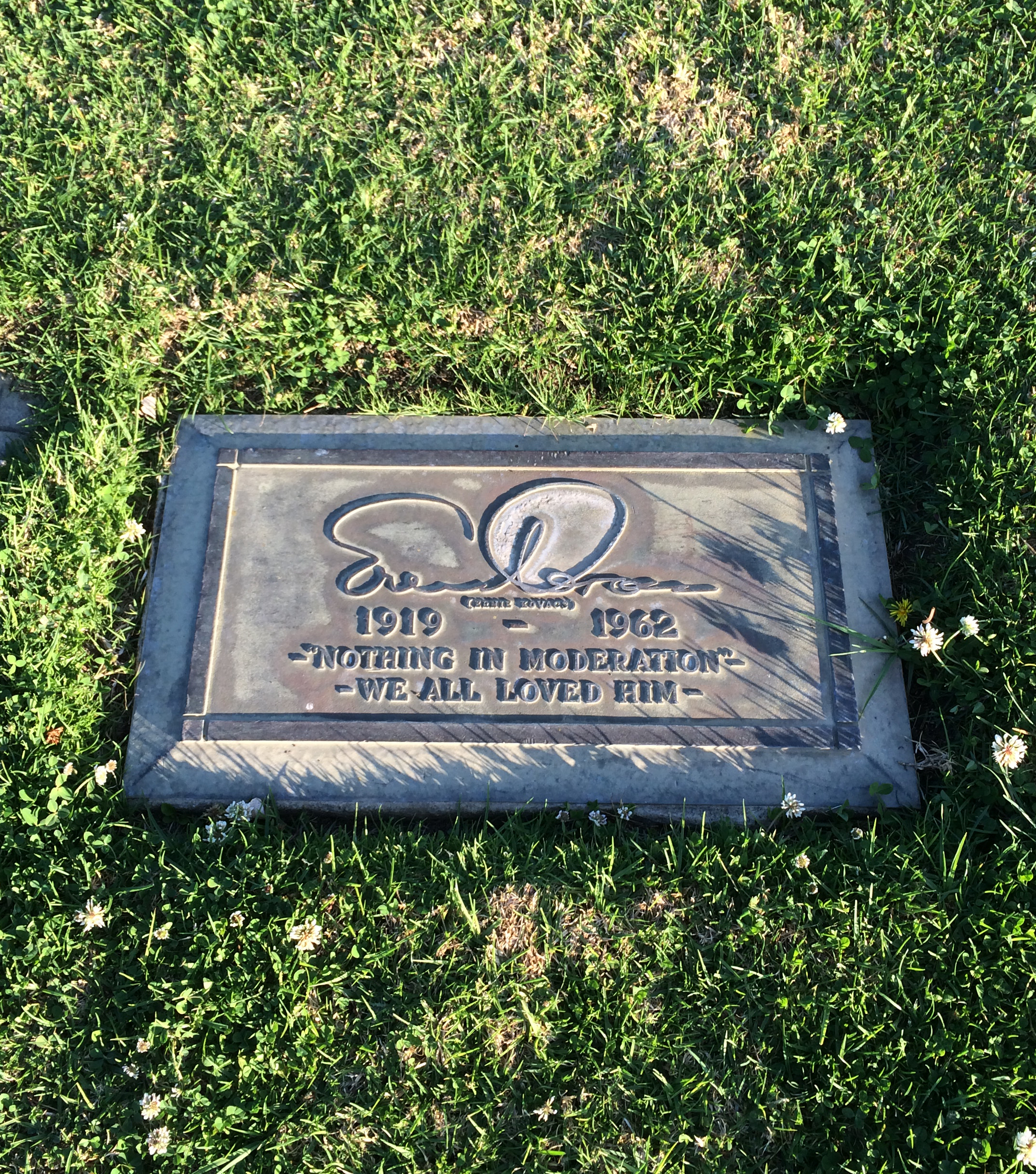
Grave of Ernie Kovacs, at Forest Lawn Hollywood Hills

In the early morning hours of January 13, 1962, Kovacs had departed a baby shower for Ruth Berle, wife of comedian Milton Berle. Kovacs lost control of his Chevrolet Corvair station wagon while turning quickly, and crashed into a power pole in West Los Angeles. He was thrown halfway out the vehicle's passenger side and died almost instantly from chest and head injuries. A photographer arrived soon after, and a photo of Kovacs's body appeared in newspapers across the United States, including the memorable image of an unlit cigar on the pavement near his outstretched hand. Kovacs was 42 years old. Kovacs was reported to have not been drinking at the baby shower, and the crash was believed to have been caused by a combination of distracted driving due to the cigar, and rainy weather.

In keeping with Kovacs's wishes, a simple service was held at the Beverly Hills Community Presbyterian Church. The pallbearers included Ernie's best friend Jack Lemmon, Frank Sinatra, Dean Martin, Billy Wilder, and Mervyn LeRoy. George Burns, Groucho Marx, Edward G. Robinson, Kirk Douglas, Jack Benny, James Stewart, Charlton Heston, Buster Keaton and Milton Berle also attended. The pastor said Kovacs had summed up his life thus: "I was born in Trenton, New Jersey in 1919 to a Hungarian couple. I've been smoking cigars ever since." He is buried in Forest Lawn-Hollywood Hills Cemetery in Los Angeles. His epitaph reads "Nothing in moderation—We all loved him."

There is a street named after Kovacs in San Antonio, Texas.

== Tax evasion ==
A frequent critic of the U.S. tax system, Kovacs owed the Internal Revenue Service several hundred thousand dollars in back taxes due to his refusal to pay the bulk of them. Up to 90% of his earnings was garnished as a result. His long battles with the IRS inspired Kovacs to invest his money in a convoluted series shell corporations in the U.S. and Canada. He would give them bizarre names, such as "The Bazooka Dooka Hicka Hocka Hookah Company". In 1961, Kovacs was served with a $75,000 lien for back taxes; that same day he bought the California Racquet Club with the apparent hope of being able to use it as a tax write-off. The property had mortgages at the time of purchase which were later paid by his wife, Edie Adams.

His tax woes also affected Kovacs's career, forcing him to take any offered work to pay his debt. This included the ABC game show Take a Good Look, appearances on variety shows such as NBC's The Ford Show, Starring Tennessee Ernie Ford, and some of his less-memorable film roles. He also filmed an unaired 1962 pilot episode for a proposed CBS series, Medicine Man (co-starring Buster Keaton; the pilot episode titled "A Pony for Chris"). Kovacs's role was that of Dr. P. Crookshank, a traveling medicine salesman in the 1870s, who was selling Mother McGreevy's Wizard Juice, also known as "man's best friend in a bottle". This was abandoned after his death, which occurred the day after filming some scenes in Griffith Park for the pilot. CBS initially intended to broadcast the show as part of a summer replacement program, The Comedy Spot, but decided against it due to problems with Kovacs's estate. The pilot is part of the public collection of the Paley Center for Media.

Some of the issues regarding Kovacs's tax problems were still unresolved years after his death. Kovacs had purchased two insurance policies in 1951; his mother was named as the primary beneficiary of them. The IRS placed a lien against them both for their cash value in 1961. To stop the actions being taken against her, Mary Kovacs had to go to Federal court. The court's early 1966 ruling resolved the issue, with the last sentence of the document reading: "Prima facie, it looks as if, within the limits of discretion permitted the government by the relevant statutes, an injustice is being done to Mary Kovacs."

Adams, who married and divorced twice after Kovacs's death, refused help from celebrity friends who planned a benefit for the purpose. "I can take care of my own children," she said, and resolved to accept offers only from those who wanted to hire her for her talents. Adams eventually paid all of Kovacs's debts. (Note: At the time of his death. Kovacs was an estimated $500,000 in debt (equivalent to over $4.5 million in 2021 dollars).)

== Lost and surviving work ==
Most of Kovacs's early television work was performed live: some kinescopes have survived. Some videotapes of his ABC specials were preserved; others, such as his quirky game show, Take a Good Look, were available mostly in short segments until recently, with the release of some complete, videotaped episodes. After Kovacs's death, Adams discovered not only that her husband owed ABC a great deal of money, but that some networks were systematically erasing and reusing tapes of Kovacs's shows or disposing of the kinescopes and videotapes. She succeeded in purchasing the rights to surviving footage with the proceeds from Kovacs's insurance policy and her own earnings after Kovacs's IRS debts were paid. In March 1996, Adams detailed her experiences before the National Film Preservation Board.

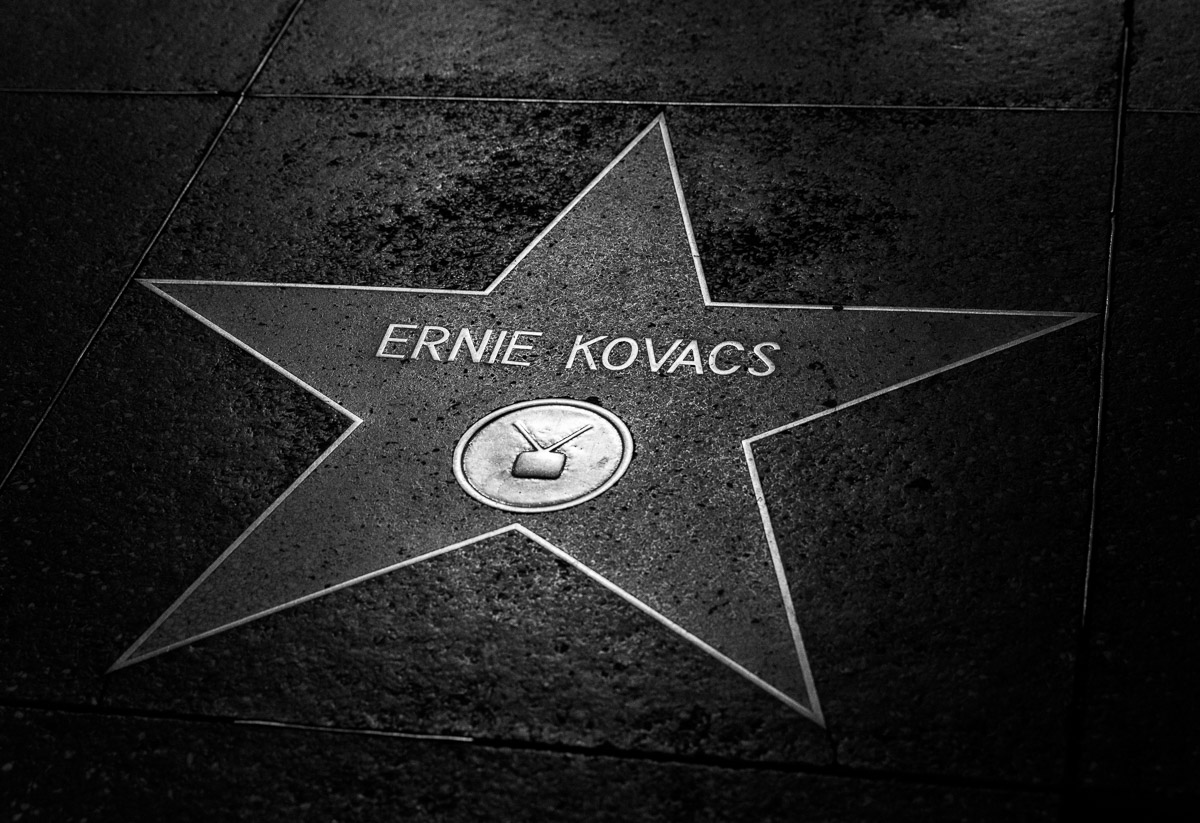
Kovacs's star on the Hollywood Walk of Fame

Adams first used some of the videotapes she had purchased for a 1968 ABC television special, The Comedy of Ernie Kovacs; to produce the show, she hired Kovacs's former producer and editor. The hour-long program was sponsored by Kovacs's former sponsor, Dutch Masters.

Most of Kovacs's salvaged work is available to researchers at the University of California, Los Angeles Library's Department of Special Collections: additional material is available at the Paley Center for Media.

Telecasts of edited compilations of some of his work by PBS (station WTTW, Chicago) under the title The Best of Ernie Kovacs in 1977, inspired the film. These broadcasts were made available on VHS and DVD. The DVD set features extras that are not in the VHS set. The series was narrated by long-time friend Jack Lemmon. The 1984 television film Ernie Kovacs: Between the Laughter helped return Kovacs to the public's attention, though the show emphasized his bid to retrieve his kidnapped children instead of his professional life. Jeff Goldblum portrayed Kovacs, Madolyn Smith portrayed Bette and Melody Anderson portrayed Adams in the movie. Edie Adams appeared in a cameo in this film, playing Mae West; it was one of the impressions she performed in shows with Kovacs.

During the early 1990s, The Comedy Channel broadcast a series of Kovacs's shows under the generic title of The Ernie Kovacs Show. The series included both the ABC specials and some of his 1950s shows from NBC. By 2008, there were no broadcast, cable, or satellite channels broadcasting any of Kovacs's television work, other than his panel appearances on What's My Line? on the Game Show Network.

On April 19, 2011, Shout! Factory released The Ernie Kovacs Collection, six DVDs spanning Kovacs's television career. The company's website also offers an extra disc with material from Tonight! and The Ernie Kovacs Show, as well as a rare color kinescope of the complete 30-minute 1957 NBC color broadcast featuring "Eugene". On October 23, 2012, Shout! Factory released The Ernie Kovacs Collection: Volume 2 on DVD. The 49 surviving episodes of the game show Take a Good Look were released on DVD by Shout! Factory on October 17, 2017.

In 1961, Kovacs recorded a record album of poetry in the character of Percy Dovetonsils named Percy Dovetonsils Thpeakth, but was unable to release it due to contractual obligations with other record companies. After he was given the masters, Kovacs donated them to a Los Angeles area hospital. Adams was able to re-acquire the tapes in 1967, and they remained part of her private collection until her death in 2008. The tapes were labeled as movie material and were thought to be such until further examination proved they were Kovacs as Percy reading his poems with no music background. The album was finally released in 2012.

Kovacs was inducted posthumously into the Broadcast Pioneers of Philadelphia's Hall of Fame in 1992.

== Partial filmography ==
- Operation Mad Ball (1957) (with Jack Lemmon) as Capt. Paul Lock
- Bell, Book and Candle (1958) (with James Stewart, Kim Novak, and Jack Lemmon) as Sidney Redlitch
- It Happened to Jane (1959) (with Doris Day and Jack Lemmon) as Harry Foster Malone
- Our Man in Havana (1959) (with Alec Guinness and Noël Coward) as Capt. Segura
- Wake Me When It's Over (1960) (with Dick Shawn) as Capt. Charlie Stark
- Strangers When We Meet (1960) (with Kirk Douglas and Kim Novak) as Roger Altar
- North to Alaska (1960) (with John Wayne) as Frankie Canon
- Pepe (1960) (with Cantinflas) as Immigration Inspector
- Five Golden Hours (1961) (with Cyd Charisse and George Sanders) as Aldo Bondi
- Sail a Crooked Ship (1961, with Robert Wagner) as Bugsy G. Foglemeyer aka The Captain

== Sources ==
- Greene, Doyle (2007). Politics and the American Television Comedy: A Critical Survey from I Love Lucy through South Park. McFarland. ISBN 978-1-476-60829-7.
- Samuel, Lawrence R. (2001). Brought to You By Postwar Television Advertising and the American Dream. University of Texas Press. ISBN 978-0-292-77763-7. via Project MUSE (subscription required)
- Spigel, Lynn (2009). TV by design: modern art and the rise of network television. University of Chicago Press. ISBN 978-0-226-76968-4.
