= Indian Emily =

Indian Emily is a fictional woman described in Fort Davis, Texas folklore.

== Story ==
The story of Indian Emily varies by rendition but involves a wounded Apache girl who is taken to the hospital in Fort Davis and cared for by a family that called her Emily. Emily fell in love with a young man (Lieutenant Thomas Easton, the son of her savior in the 1919 version; Lieutenant John Essen, her savior himself in later ones) but fled when she learned of his engagement to another woman. She returned to Fort Davis to warn of an upcoming attack, only to be shot by a sentry as she tried to enter the garrison. Her last words warned of the attack and expressed her love for the man. The next day, the garrison successfully defended itself due to her warning.

== History ==
This story was initially published in Carlyle Raht's The Romance of Davis Mountains and Big Bend Country in 1919. Ten years later, a slightly different version was published in the Dallas Semi-Weekly News, and then again, for a larger audience in April 1930 in the Frontier Times.

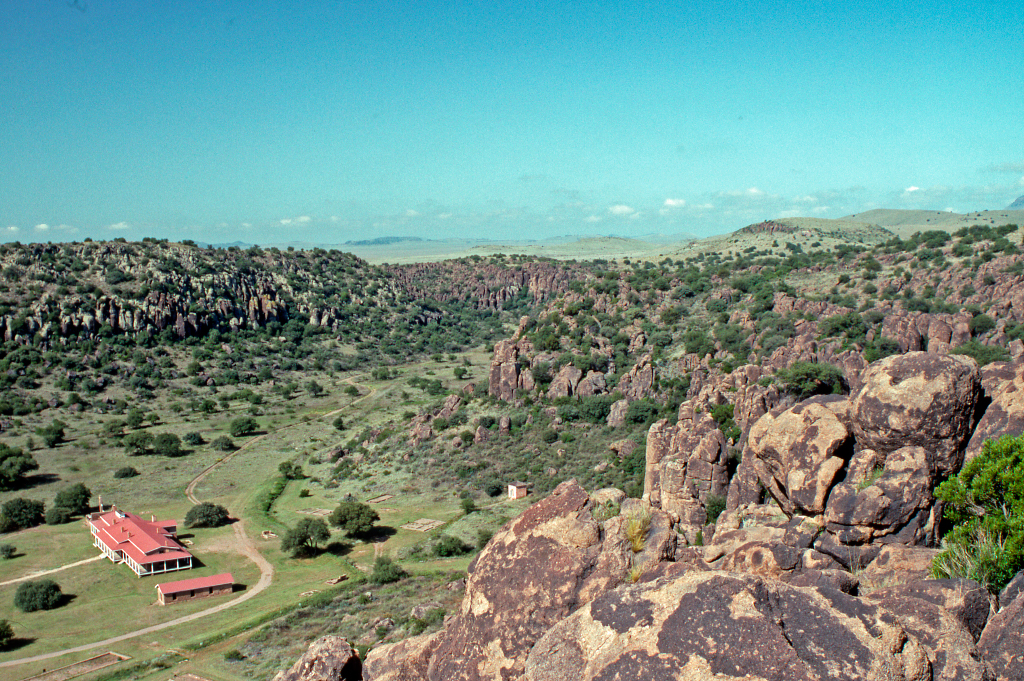
Fort Davis seen from North Ridge

Fort Davis historian and newspaperman Barry Scobee told Raht's version in several newspaper articles and books on Fort Davis, embellishing the story. Scobee added elements of a sentimental slave-master relationship, placing Emily as Mrs. Easton's maid and having her call for Mrs. Easton as she dies. In 1936, Scobee and other residents successfully advocated that the Texas Centennial Commission erect a historical marker on the fort's grounds, at the purported site of her grave. The monument reads "Here lies Indian Emily, an Apache girl, whose love for a young officer induced her to give warning of an Indian attack. Mistaken for an enemy, she was shot by a sentry, but saved the garrison from massacre."

In 1955, Scobee admitted in a letter that he knew the U.S. army had no record of Lieutenant Tom Easton, but "for the most part kept mum about it, so as not to wreck a good story". In 1960, Scobee admitted that there was little evidence to support the story, adding that there was little evidence that the Apache ever attacked the fort.

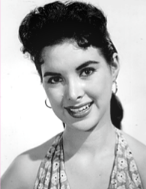
Jolene Brand played Indian Emily in an episode of Death Valley Days

The story was repeated in an episode of Death Valley Days, with an episode dedicated to the story of Indian Emily, played by Jolene Brand. Meg Wyllie and Burt Metcalfe played Mrs. Easton and Tom.

A 1968 article in Big West Magazine claimed that Indian Emily persisted as a ghost, screaming for Tom to return to her.

J. T. Rutherford attended Fort Davis's centennial celebration and told the story on the Congress floor. When he later brokered a deal to establish national parks on the east and west coasts, he added Fort Davis as a National Historic Site, the story of Indian Emily helping to establish the decision.

When Fort Davis became a part of the National Park Service, researchers unsuccessfully searched for historical evidence of Indian Emily. In 1960, some researchers dug at the historical marker where Indian Emily was said to be buried, to find an empty gravesite.

== Historic Basis ==
Scobee claimed that the story would have been set at the height of Apache activity in the area, around 1880. William Hall contradicted this claim, saying it would have happened shortly after the post was established in 1867. Fred Atkinson, who wrote about the story in the Big West magazine in 1968, set the story with the Third U. S. Cavalry in Fort Davis from 1885 to 1887, between 1890 and 1891.

The National Park Service cites two specific instances that might have inspired the Indian Emily story. In September 1868, North Cavalry troops returned to Fort Davis from a skirmish with Indians about a hundred miles away with a female Indian child and two Mexican boys who had been held captive. Another possibility references an 1881 incident in which Texas Rangers captured a wounded Indian woman and two children near Van Horn, Texas and brought them to Fort Davis. On January 9, 1882, post-surgeon Paul R. Brown recorded the "cowardly and brutal murder" of the woman, whose head had been split with an axe, with "rape seem[ing] to have been the object".

Historians also note that when the post cemetery was moved upon Fort Davis's 1891 deactivation, one grave was not that of an "Indian Squaw".

Historian Bruce Lamberson found that there was never an army officer of any rank named Easton before 1900. While some civilian Mr. Easton/Easdons were in Fort Davis, he also could not find a Miss Nelson, Lieutenant Easton's purported fiancée.
