= Take a Good Look (TV series) =

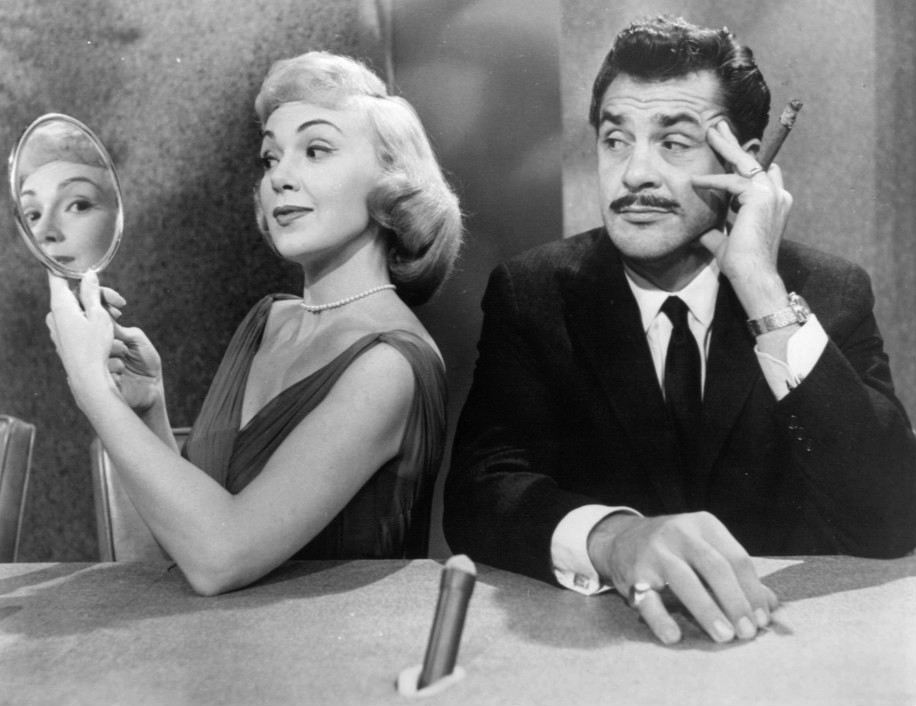
- Kovacs and wife Edie Adams in a promotional photo for the show, 1960
- Created by: Ernie Kovacs
- Directed by: Barry Shear; Joey Behar
- Presented by: Ernie Kovacs
- Narrated by: Johnny Jacobs
- Country of origin: United States
- No. of seasons: 2
- No. of episodes: 53

Production
- Producers: Maury Cohen; Milt Hoffman; Peter Arnell
- Running time: 25 minutes

Original release
- Network: ABC
- Release: October 22, 1959 – February 9, 1961

Take a Good Look is an American television game show created by and starring Ernie Kovacs, which aired from 1959 to 1961 on ABC's Thursday-night block at 10:30 PM Eastern Time.

Season 1 consisted of 39 episodes, from October 22, 1959, to July 21, 1960. Season 2 was far shorter, airing just 14 episodes between October 27, 1960, and February 9, 1961. Twenty episodes were repackaged for syndication in September 1978. In October 2017, all 49 surviving episodes were made available on a DVD set released by Shout Factory.

== Background ==
First appearing on television in 1951, Kovacs was an extremely prolific producer of television comedy throughout the 1950s. As a result of the critical success of his 1957 NBC special Silent Show, Ernie came to Hollywood in 1958, where he had a film contract with Columbia Pictures to write and consult on screenplays – but no television series of his own. At that time, sponsors did not buy commercial time on a television shows as a commodity; rather, a sponsor would produce a television program in its entirety and present it to a network for broadcast. While visiting a Hollywood movie set, Kovacs happened to meet a cigar company executive who was impressed that Kovacs continually smoked a cigar. Ernie was impressed that this corporate executive was carrying a book on Bertold Brecht.

As a result of this chance meeting, a business deal ensued in which Consolidated Cigar/Dutch Masters became the sole sponsor of Ernie's newest idea for a television series. In the show itself, Ernie performed in many Dutch Masters commercials, usually presented as yet another type of "blackout gag" shown during the show and themselves unique due to being done completely in pantomime and directed by Kovacs himself. The Congress of TV Editorial Writers was impressed enough with the silent commercials to award Kovacs with their Madison Avenue Award in 1960.

== Format ==
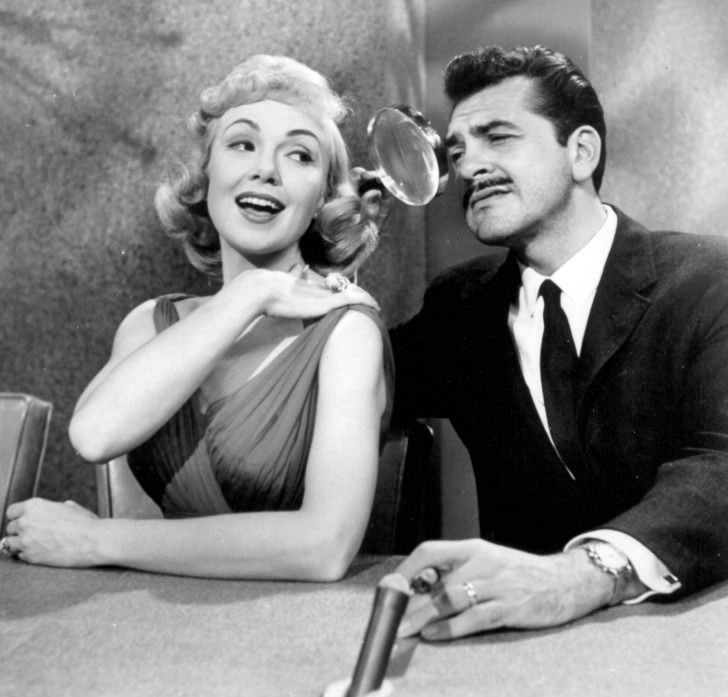
Kovacs and Edie Adams share a laugh on the show's set. Kovacs hosted the program while Adams was one of the panelists.

Take A Good Look was inspired by the Goodson-Todman panel game shows of the era, To Tell the Truth, I've Got a Secret, and What's My Line?. Kovacs, who appeared on What's My Line? ten times as a guest panelist (July–November 1957) and twice as the show's Mystery Guest (September 6, 1956 and September 7, 1957) produced and hosted a format similar to those shows: a panel of celebrities attempted to guess a secret about a seemingly ordinary person brought onstage.

In early episodes, the clues were presented by way of props and short video clips that had no cast, but eventually the show switched to using films of short comedy blackout gags starring Kovacs and a regular cast. The clips pertained only vaguely to the person about whom guesses were being made. For example, for a woman whose secret was that she was a harness track jockey, Kovacs would show a short skit about two competing chariot racers trying to sabotage each other during a race. Another example was for a champion bubble blower, Kovacs showed a skit regarding a model train set for a movie scene; the sole hint was the sound a train makes, "choo-choo", and the extreme vagueness of this clue suggests that the skits were meant to be recycled. The skit actors for the show were Peggy Connelly, Jolene Brand, and Bobby Lauher.

Some of the people who were the focus of the guessing game were ordinary people who had experienced an extraordinary event, recently been in the news, or enjoyed a distinction of some kind. A panelist would be awarded one point if they guessed the person's identity/secret. At the end of the show, prizes would be awarded to the home viewer represented by the panelist with the most points.

== Panelists ==
Appearing regularly throughout the run were Edie Adams, Cesar Romero, Hans Conried, and Ben Alexander. Carl Reiner only appeared regularly in Season 2.

Among the less frequent panelists of Season 1 were Zsa Zsa Gabor, Jane Wyatt, Mort Sahl, Jack Carson, Tony Randall, Janet Leigh, and Jim Backus. No infrequent panelists appeared in Season 2.
