= Jolene Brand =

American actress

- Brand in 2026
- Born: Jolene Marie Bufkin
- Occupation: Actress
- Years active: 1957–1966
- Spouse: George Schlatter (m. 1956)
- Children: 2

Jolene Brand (born Jolene Marie Bufkin) is an American actress. She acted most in the 1950s and 1960s, and appeared in seven episodes of the Ernie Kovacs television shows.

== Early years ==
Brand was from Baldwin Park, California. She graduated from Covina High School and attended Mt. San Antonio College. She won an American Legion beauty contest in 1951 and was queen of the Los Angeles County Fair of 1953, Miss Red Feather, Miss Baldwin Park, the Future Farmers of America Queen, and a WAMPUS Baby Star.

== Career ==
Early in her career, Brand performed in Las Vegas, and in 1955 she sang and danced at Ciro's night club in California. Also in 1955 she was named a WAMPAS Baby Star.

In 1958, she acted in the B-film Giant from the Unknown, about a man who was frozen in suspended animation for 500 years and was freed by a lightning bolt and goes on a killing spree. Later that year, she was signed up to play a part in the Disney television show Zorro. She played the romantic interest for the main character played by Guy Williams. She was a model on the television series Queen for a Day as well.

Brand portrayed "Indian Emily" in the 1959 episode of the same name on the syndicated television anthology series, Death Valley Days, hosted by Stanley Andrews. The setting is the United States Army outpost at Fort Davis, Texas. Emily, an Apache captive, adopts the white man's ways but flees when a young officer, Tom Easton (Burt Metcalfe), whom she loves, prepares to marry someone else. She returns to warn the fort of a pending Apache attack, and dies of a gunshot wound fired in error after saving the fort. Meg Wyllie played Tom's compassionate mother, Mrs. Easton. A memorial at Fort Davis honors the heroism of Indian Emily. Brand and her husband George Schlatter were close friends with Kovacs and his wife, Edie Adams. Brand appeared with Kovacs in many of his later ABC-TV programs.

== Filmography ==
=== Film ===
Film
Year	Title	Role	Notes
1958	Giant from the Unknown aka The Diablo Giant	Ann Brown	Credited as Joline Brand

=== Television ===
Television
Year	Title	Role	Notes
1966	Vacation Playhouse	Wanda	Episode: "The Hoofer"
1962	Hawaiian Eye	Lola	Episode: "Janine Westerfield"
1962	Bronco	Emily	Episode: "A Town That Lived and Died"
1961 - 1962	The Ernie Kovacs Show	Various	Episode: 7 appearances from 18 May 1961 to 23 January 1962
1961	Cheyenne	Lorna Abbott	Episode: "Legacy Of the Lost"
1961	Maverick	Penelope Baxter	Episode: "A Technical Error"
1960	Guestward, Ho!	Pink Cloud	Episode: "The Christmas Spirit"
1960	Mr. Lucky	Clara Iglesias	Episode: "Operation Fortuna"
1960	Hennesey	Nurse	Episode: "Angel Face"
1960	Hennesey	Gloria	Episode: "Senior Nurse"
1960	Hennesey	Wave	Episode: "Hennesey and the Ancient Vehicle"
1960	The Detectives Starring Robert Taylor	Ann	Episode: "Anatomy of Fear"
1959	Man with a Camera	Joyce Whitman	Episode: "The Bride"
1959	Death Valley Days	Emily	Episode: "Indian Emily"
1959	Whirlybirds	Jackie Bryan	Episode: "The Deadly Game"
1959	Whirlybirds	Lucy	Episode: "If I Were King"
1959	U.S. Marshal	Connie James	Episode: "Federal Agent"
1958 - 1959	Zorro	Anna Maria Verdugo	Episode: 9 Episodes from 1958 - 1959
1958	Rescue 8	Linda Carson	Episode: "Calamity Coach"
1958	State Trooper	Mrs. Reinhardt	Episode: "Firebug"
1957	The George Burns and Gracie Allen Show	Lucy	Episode: "Misery Loves Company"
1957	Gunsmoke	Young Bride	Episode: "How to Kill a Woman"
1957	Official Detective	Jean Walsh	Episode: "The Hostages"
1959	Take a Good Look	Self	Episode: Episode dated 31 December 1959
