= Syndics of the Drapers' Guild =

1662 painting by Rembrandt

The Sampling Officials
- De Staalmeesters (Dutch)
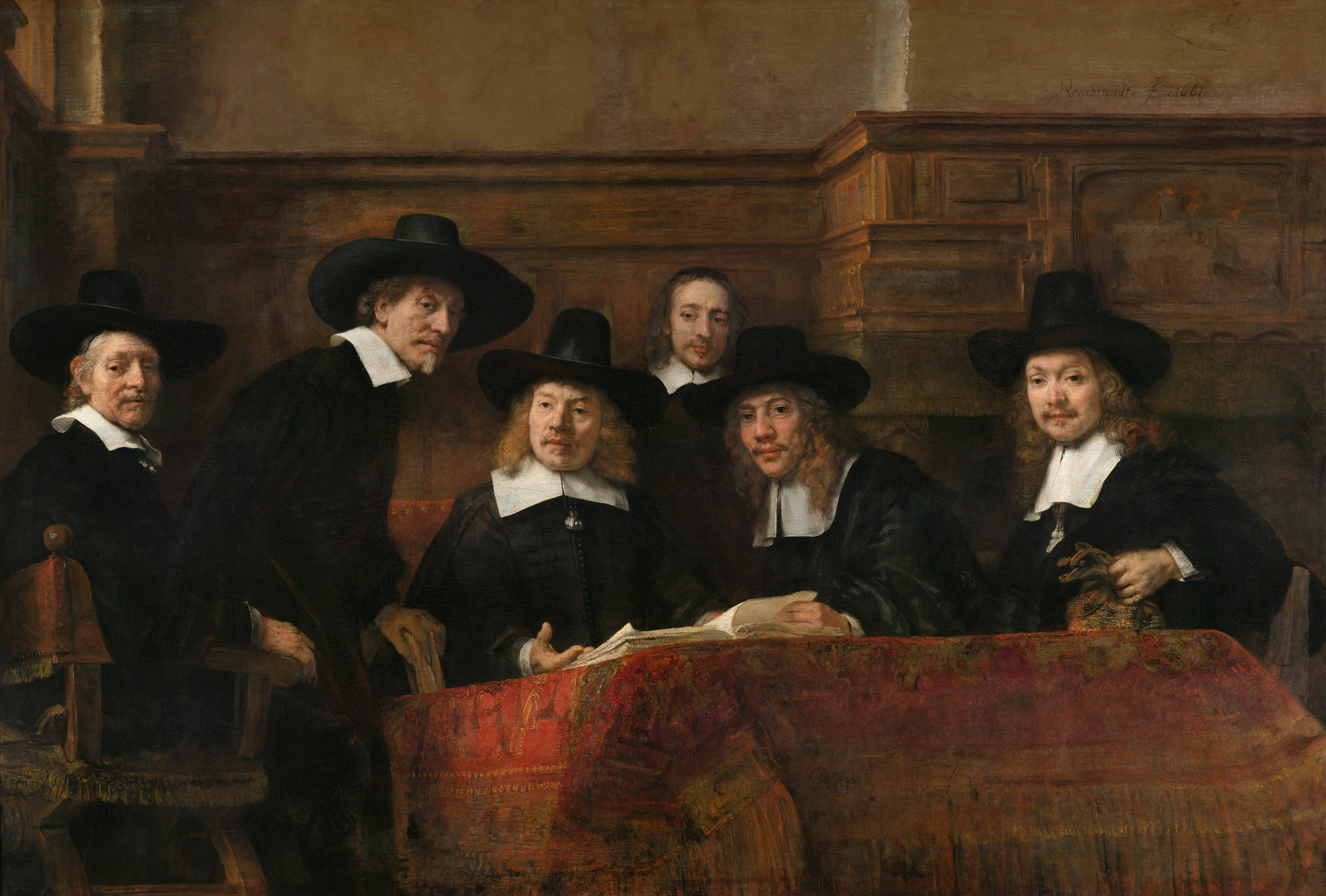
- Artist: Rembrandt
- Year: 1662
- Medium: Oil on canvas
- Movement: Baroque painting, Dutch Golden Age painting
- Dimensions: 191.5 cm × 279 cm (75.4 in × 110 in)
- Location: Rijksmuseum, Amsterdam

The Sampling Officials (Dutch: De Staalmeesters), also called Syndics of the Drapers' Guild (Dutch: De waardijns van het Amsterdamse lakenbereidersgilde), is a 1662 oil painting by Rembrandt. It is now in the Rijksmuseum in Amsterdam. It has been described as his "last great collective portrait".

The painting is a group portrait of five gentlemen from the Amsterdam cloth guild who were responsible for inspecting the cloth, along with their servant. They were not the regents of the guild but the wardens: two Catholics, a Mennonite, a Remonstrant, and a Reformed Protestant. Their one-year terms in office began on Good Friday and they were expected to conduct their inspections thrice weekly. It was an unpaid honorary position. To compare the quality of different batches of cloth, they used 'samples,' test pieces of fabric—hence their name, "staalmeesters" (masters of samples in Dutch). There were four grades of quality, the highest was indicated by pressing four seals and the lowest by pressing only one. The inspectors used pliers to press the seals of their city (front) and guild (reverse) into penny-sized slugs of lead that were specially affixed to record the results of the inspection. They met three times a week. The "staalmeesters" depicted performed their duties from Good Friday 1661 to Good Friday 1662. Van Doeyenburg acted as the chairman of the group. The open book likely concerns the guild's accounting records. For a long time it was thought that the man on the far right of the painting was holding a bag of stamps, but during the restoration in 1991 it was found to be a pair of gloves.

The men, who are appraising a length of Persian-style fabric against exemplars from a swatch book, are (from left to right):

- Jacob van Loon (1595–1674)
- Volckert Jansz (1605 or 1610–1681)
- Willem van Doeyenburg (c. 1616–1687)
- Frans Hendricksz Bel (1629–1701)
- Aernout van der Mye (c. 1625–1681)
- Jochem de Neve (1629–1681)

The guild commissioned this portrait and it hung in their guildhall, the Staalhof (nl), until 1771.

The painting is used on the packaging of Dutch Masters brand cigars. The painting is also seen on the wall in H. G. Wells' house in the opening sequence of the 1960 film The Time Machine. The painting has a prominent part in Jeffrey Archer's 2019 book Nothing Ventured. It is used on the cover of the book titled The Company: A Short History of a Revolutionary Idea by John Micklethwait and Adrian Wooldridge. The painting plays an important role in Zadie Smith's book On Beauty, in which one of the main characters, Howard Belsey, is a Rembrandt scholar.

== Composition and style ==
Rembrandt likely considered the placement of the painting on the wall, as he chose a perspective with a fairly low vantage point, allowing the viewer to look up at the table from below. This angle magnifies the stature of the "staalmeesters" (cloth inspectors) enhancing their sense of importance. He also likely adjusted the lighting in the painting to match the actual lighting of the location where the painting was originally intended to hang. The paneling in the background of the painting likely matched the original interior design of the room in the Staalhof. The work was probably hung quite high in the room, above a mantelpiece, so the upward perspective had a practical function: it matched the viewer's line of sight in the room. This perspective makes the tabletop invisible, showing only the view of a heavy, rich tablecloth. This technique allowed Rembrandt to position the figures almost in a straight line: five dark shapes, their white collars, and the serious, frontal gazes of the "staalmeesters", fully aware of the importance of their role. This arrangement presents the viewer with a row of five distinguished, intense faces, aligned almost horizontally but with a slight oscillation like lanterns.

== See also ==
- Regents group portrait
- List of paintings by Rembrandt
