= The Fabulous Funnies =

1968 American television special

- Written by: Bill Persky, Sam Denoff, Lee Mendelson, George Schlatter
- Directed by: Gordon Wiles
- Presented by: Carl Reiner
- Starring: Ken Berry, Jack Burns, Avery Schreiber
- Music by: John Scott Trotter
- Country of origin: United States

Production
- Producers: Lee Mendelson, George Schlatter
- Running time: 60 mins
- Production company: Lee Mendelson Film Productions

Original release
- Network: NBC
- Release: February 11, 1968

The Fabulous Funnies is a one-hour primetime network special that aired on NBC on February 11, 1968, hosted by Carl Reiner. The show is a salute to American comic strips, and features interviews with cartoonists, including Rube Goldberg, Chester Gould, Chic Young, Milt Caniff, Al Capp and Charles Schulz.

In addition, the show includes songs that have been written about comic strips, performed by the Doodletown Pipers, the Royal Guardsmen and Ken Berry. Ken Berry sings a song from the Li'l Abner musical, and the Royal Guardsmen perform their hit single "Snoopy vs. the Red Baron". Other songs featured in the program include "Barney Google (With the Goo-Goo-Googly Eyes)" and "Little Chatterbox," inspired by Little Orphan Annie. The comedy team of Burns and Schreiber also perform a skit about people reading comic strips.

In one sequence, Reiner interacts with animated comic strip characters, leading production supervisor David Crommie to brag, "This is, perhaps, the most difficult show that has ever been done for television. Production began in January 1967, and continued until the end of the year. When you combine live action with animation, the impossible takes a lot longer!"

The show did very well in the ratings, reaching #7 for the week according to the Nielsen ratings, and garnered a follow-up a decade later. In an article about producer Lee Mendelson, comics historian Mark Evanier says, "The ratings were huge and the folks at CBS, for whom Lee was producing the Charlie Brown specials, said to him, "Why didn't you offer that special to us?" Lee replied, "I did. You didn't think it would do very well and passed so I sold it to NBC." The folks at CBS said, "Well... we want the next one." It was not until 1980 that Lee did the next one, which was called The Fantastic Funnies and yes, it was on CBS."

== Cartoonists ==
The cartoonists featured in the special are:

- Dik Browne (Hi and Lois)
- Ernie Bushmiller (Nancy)
- Al Capp (Li'l Abner)
- Milt Caniff (Steve Canyon)
- Bob Dunn (They'll Do It Every Time)
- Hal Foster (Prince Valiant)
- Rube Goldberg (The Inventions of Professor Lucifer Gorganzola Butts)
- Chester Gould (Dick Tracy)
- Fred Lasswell (Barney Google and Snuffy Smith)
- Jerry Robinson (Still Life)
- Howie Schneider (Eek & Meek)
- Charles Schulz (Peanuts)
- Al Smith (Mutt and Jeff)
- Otto Soglow (The Little King)
- Leonard Starr (On Stage)

== Reception ==
The next day's review in The New York Times was not kind, saying that the show "unfortunately turned out to be little more than a superficial look at one of the more interesting aspects of this country's kitsch culture. The producers were faced with an embarrassment of riches and did not know what to do with them. In attempting too much, the program did nothing well... Basically, the producers made the mistake of ignoring the strips themselves and leaving the viewer in the dark as to what, in fact, made them 'funnies.'"

Similarly, The Baltimore Sun said, "It was plain from the beginning that those who produced it — Lee Mendelson and George Schlatter — failed to understand the scope and significance of their subject... The producers wasted precious time in superfluous matters and lumped together various manifestations of the comics, such as their radio versions, their invasion of the theater, and their proliferation in movies and television... The worst was a song, "Snoopy and the Red Baron", played with childish monkey business by a rock 'n' roll group called the Royal Guardsmen. It must have made Charles Schulz's blood run cold."

On the other hand, the Ludington Daily News was enchanted with the show: "It was first cabin all the way, thanks in great measure to that gifted and civilized showman, Carl Reiner, who not only provided the link for the animated sequences, musical numbers, film clips and interviews with cartoonists — but set a new standard for video hosts as well. Despite the excellent organization and format of the show, it was the ubiquitous Reiner — participating in the animation, clowning, narrating with style and even singing "Little Orphan Annie" — who gave the hour its final touch of high gloss."
