= Backwoods Smokes =

American cigar brand

Backwood Smokes
- Product type: Cigar
- Current owner: Universal Leaf co.
- Produced by: ITG Brands
- Country: United States
- Introduced: 1973; 53 years ago
- Markets: United States
- Website: backwoodscigars.com

Backwoods is an American brand of cigars that was introduced in 1973. This product was notable during the 1970s and 1980s for heavy advertising, which became one of the more obvious examples of how companies at the time reacted to changing laws and cultural views on public health and smoking culture.

== History ==
Backwoods Smokes were released in the United States shortly after the Public Health Cigarette Smoking Act was enacted by President Richard Nixon on April 1, 1970. They were a part of a wide attempt by cigarette manufacturers at the time to circumvent the universal ban on cigarette advertising, which came about as both consumers and professionals became more aware of the harmful effects of cigarette smoking.

Fearing loss of profit from being unable to advertise cigarettes through the heavy influence of television, several companies began to market "little cigars" instead. This allowed their new products to be advertised to the television-viewing public without violating the new ordinance enacted by President Nixon.

Backwoods Smokes were designed to have a rustic, "manly" appeal to them, and to appear as natural as possible. Marketing was directed heavily at outdoorsmen and similar groups. Emphasis is placed upon the fact that the cigars are made from all-natural tobacco with no homogenized components. They are frequently classified as mild and flavorful. Over the years, the company began to produce different flavors and types of these cigars, much like most other small cigar companies on the market today.

== Advertising ==
Backwoods Smokes advertisement, c. 1983

Backwoods Smokes were advertised heavily throughout the 1970s and 1980s, with virtually no changes being made to their target group during this time. An example advertisement from 1983 shows a man climbing the side of a snowy mountain, with the phrase "If you ever wanted to climb Mt. Rainier, you're a natural Backwoods man" in large print. In the foreground, a hand is holding up a pack of Backwoods Smokes that says "Wild 'N Mild Smokes, All Natural Tobacco". In a sidebar, the advertisement also reads:

"For an experience that's strictly wild, you can't top a climb like this. But for one that's wild and mild, pack along Backwoods Smokes. Backwoods are all natural tobacco, with genuine Broadleaf wrapper aged one full year to bring out its natural sweetness. Backwoods Smokes. For the man who likes his pleasures wild and mild. ALL NATURAL TOBACCO. HOW CAN ANYTHING THAT LOOKS SO WILD TASTE SO MILD?"

This illustrates a common concept during advertising for tobacco products at the time; growing public health concerns had largely changed the perceptions of the general public towards smoking. In reaction to this, many advertising campaigns began to be directed at very specific groups of people, rather than at the public as a whole. This effect was long-reaching and can be seen in the wide variety and number of tobacco products available in more modern times.

== Use with cannabis ==
Backwoods are commonly used by cannabis smokers to create blunts. Users unroll the cigar, discard the tobacco, then reroll the cigar with ground cannabis to smoke.

== See also ==
- Cigarillo
- Tobacco advertising
- Comprehensive Smoking Education Act
- Regulation of nicotine marketing
