= Cigarillo =

Rolled bundle of dried and fermented tobacco leaves made to be smoked

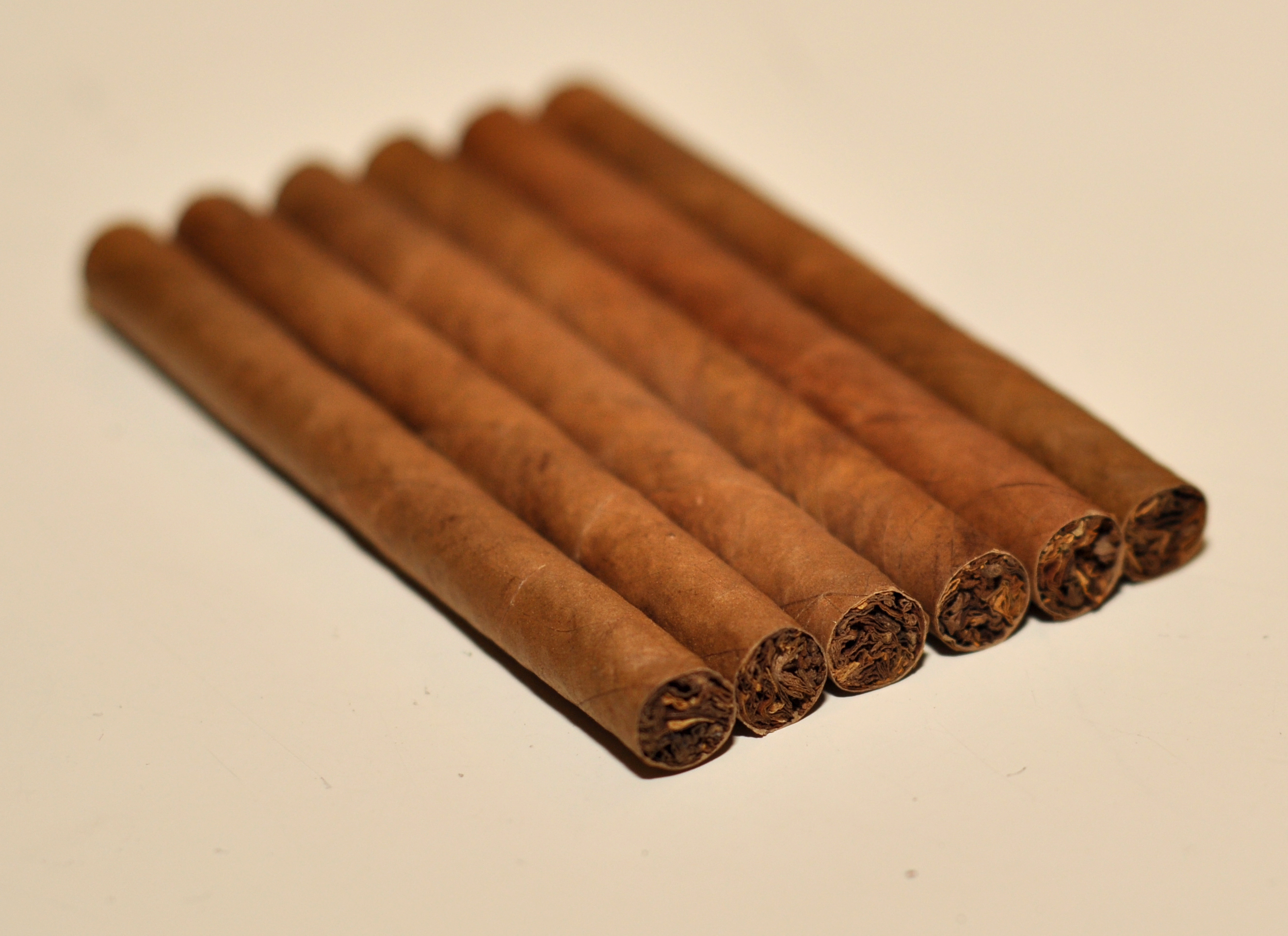
Café Crème, sold in 115 countries, is the best-selling cigarillo brand in the United Kingdom and France.

A cigarillo (from Spanish cigarrillo 'cigarette') (Note: Pronounced [siɣaˈriʝo] in Latin America and parts of Spain, generally [θiɣaˈriʎo] or [θiɣaˈriʝo] in Spain. In turn from cigarro 'cigar' and -illo (diminutive suffix).) is a short, narrow cigar. Unlike cigarettes, cigarillos are wrapped in tobacco leaves or brown, tobacco-based paper. Cigarillos are smaller than regular cigars but usually larger than cigarettes. Cigarillos are typically made without filters, similar to cigars, and are meant to be smoked without inhaling to the lungs. A typical cigarillo contains three grams of tobacco.

== Description ==
A cigarillo is a short, narrow cigar. Unlike cigarettes, cigarillos are wrapped in tobacco leaves or brown, tobacco-based paper. Cigarillos are smaller than cigars but typically larger than cigarettes. Normally made without filters, cigarillos are smoked like a cigar and not inhaled (except those made in this form only for specific tax issues).

Generally, a cigarillo contains about three grams of tobacco; the length varies from seven to ten centimetres (3–4 in) and the diameter is about 6–9 mm, usually 8 mm. Comparatively, a cigarette contains less than one gram of tobacco, and is about eight centimetres (3 in) in length and 8 mm in diameter. Most cigarillos are machine-made, which is cheaper than hand-rolling. It is unusual to store them in humidors, partly because they are smoked in large quantities and so have a short shelf-life.

Cheap cigarillos are typically marketed as a brand rather than with the term cigarillo. In the United Kingdom, common consumer brands include Henri Wintermans Signature (formerly Café Creme) and Hamlets. In the rest of Europe, they include Dannemann Moods, Candlelight, Agio Panters and Mehari's, Clubmaster and Handelsgold are popular. In the United States, they include Swisher Sweets, Black & Mild, Backwoods, Dutch Masters, Garcia Y Vega, Game, Optimo, Good Times, and Phillies. Some famous cigar brands, such as Cohiba or Davidoff, also make cigarillos: Cohiba Mini and Davidoff Club Cigarillos.

In Spanish-speaking countries, as well as in the Philippines, cigarrillo means a cigarette. Anglo-Americans were first introduced to 'cigarrillos' on a massive scale during their conquest of New Mexico and California in the American-Mexican War 1846–1848. It was observed that, "Both sexes smoke cigarrillos almost incessantly".

== Taxation ==
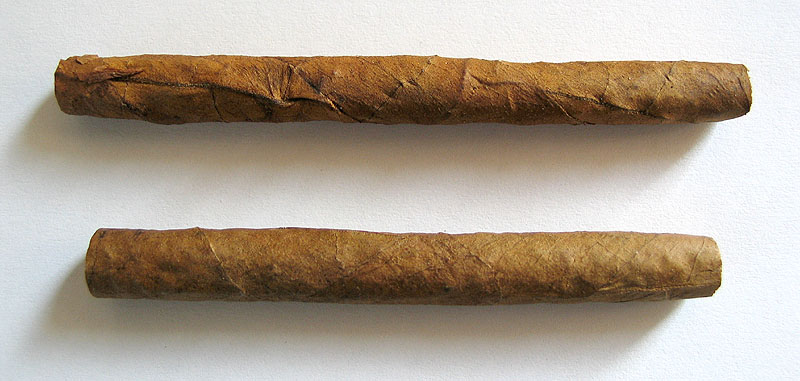
Two cigarillos - Cohiba Mini and Dannemann Moods, the latter being the best-selling brand in Germany

In the United States, cigarillos (and cigars) were taxed at a lower rate than cigarettes. In February 2009, an increase from 5 cents to 40 cents per pack as part of the SCHIP expansion bill set a tax rate similar to that for cigarettes.

== Health concerns ==
Like other tobacco products, cigarillos are a health risk to those who smoke them. In Brazil, Uruguay, Canada, Australia, New Zealand, India, and throughout Europe they are subject to the same laws which require manufacturers to place a health warning on a portion of each package. Like cigars, cigarillos are not meant to be inhaled. As a result of this, it is often assumed that cigarillos are a healthier alternative to cigarettes, but health authorities around the world still warn smokers of the risk they pose due to smoke being in the mouth.

== See also ==
- Beedi
- Cheroot
- Blunt (cigar)
- Smoking culture
- Swisher Sweets

== Sources ==
- Johnston, Abraham Robinson; Edwards, Marcellus Ball; Ferguson, Philip Gooch (1936). Bieber, Ralph P. (ed.). Marching with the Army of the West 1846–1848. Glendale, California: the Arthur H. Clark Company.
