= George Schlatter =

American television producer and director (b. 1929)

- Schlatter in 2026
- Born: December 31, 1929 (age 96); Birmingham, Alabama, U.S.
- Education: Pepperdine University
- Occupations: Producer, director
- Years active: 1952–present
- Spouse: Jolene Brand (m. 1956)
- Children: 2

George Schlatter (born December 31, 1929) is an American television producer and director, best known for Rowan & Martin's Laugh-In, founder of the American Comedy Awards, and author of Still Laughing: A Life in Comedy (Unnamed Press 2023).

For his work on television, Schlatter has a star on the Hollywood Walk of Fame at 7030 Hollywood Blvd.

== Life and career ==
Schlatter was born on December 31, 1929, (Note: Schlatter's year of birth has regularly been given as 1932, as he lied about his age early in his career: "I should have told a bigger lie and said I was born in 1942.") in Birmingham, Alabama, and raised in Webster Groves, Missouri, a St. Louis inner-ring suburb. His father, George Schlatter, was a salesman, and his mother, Miriam Hoover, was a violinist. Schlatter is a Christian, although he is often described as Jewish. His father was a Presbyterian of German descent, and his mother was a Christian Scientist. As a teenager, Schlatter sang for two seasons with the St. Louis Municipal Opera, where his mother also performed. He attended Pepperdine University in Los Angeles, California.

Schlatter was a Hollywood agent in the band and act department of MCA Records. After several years, he left to become general manager at the Sunset Strip nightclub Ciro's. The comedy team of Dan Rowan and Dick Martin performed there. He briefly worked for NBC in 1956 before forming his own production company George Schlatter Productions in 1960. In the early 1960s, following a short stint in Las Vegas, he started producing variety series and specials for television. Between 1964 and 1970, he oversaw the annual telecast of the Grammy Awards. In 1967, he first formed Schlatter-Friendly Productions with Ed Friendly, and then when the partnership broke in 1972, they formed George Schlatter Productions, noted for Rowan and Martin's Laugh In on NBC.

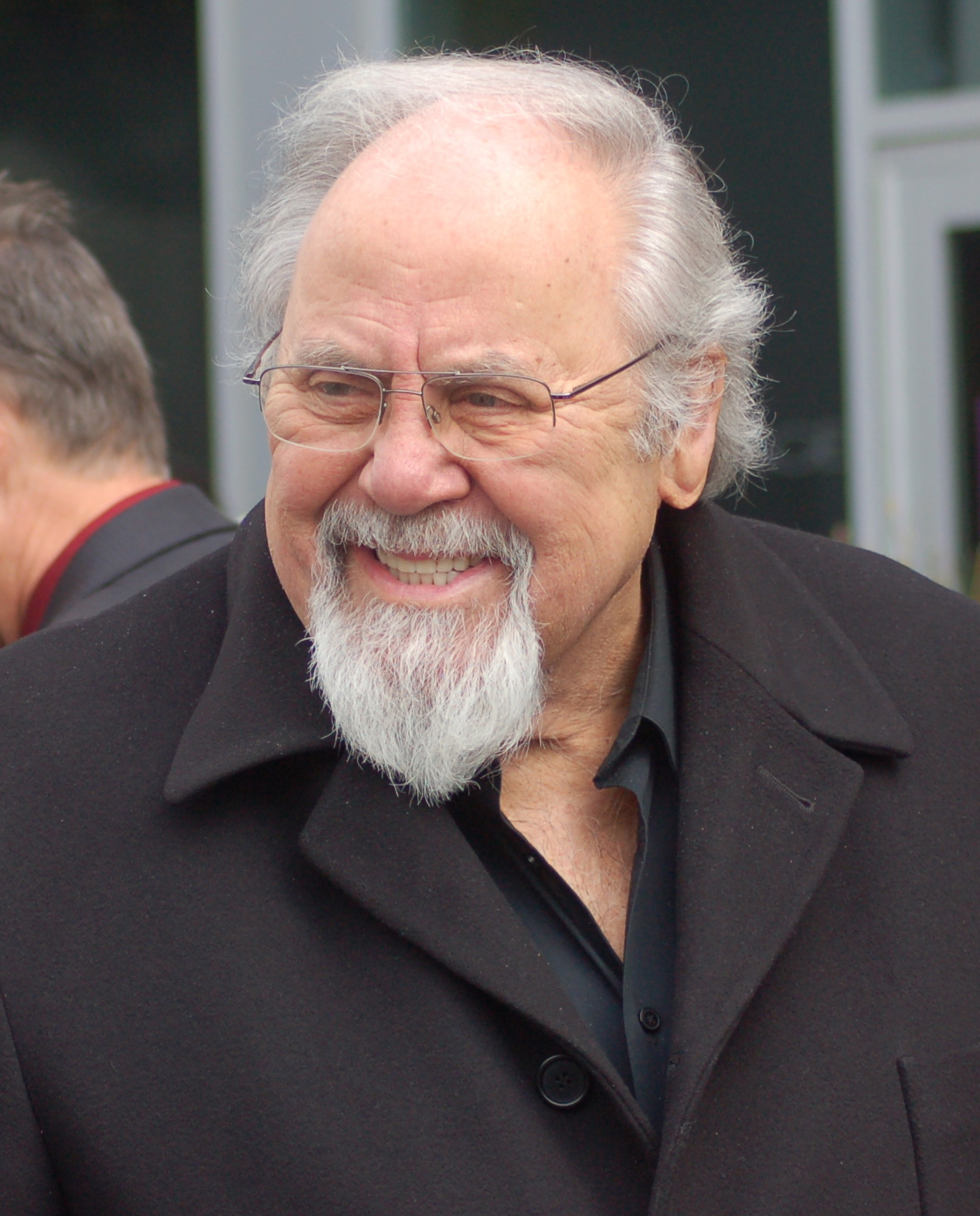
Schlatter in 2011

In the 1970s and 1980s, Schlatter produced and directed several television series, while continuing to produce variety specials. In 1987, he started "The American Comedy Awards", which was an annual event through 2001. Schlatter also produced a few feature films, and owns The Editing Company, which for many years was one of Hollywood's busiest state-of-the-art post production facilities.

Schlatter has been married to actress Jolene Brand since 1956, who was a regular on several Ernie Kovacs shows of the early 1960s. They have two daughters.

== Television work ==
A partial listing of his television achievements follows.

=== Executive producer ===
- Muhammad Ali's All-Star 60th Birthday Celebration! (2002)
- Rowan & Martin's Laugh-In (1968–1972)
- Turn-On (1969; unsuccessful)
- Arnold's Closet Revue (1971)
- Real People (1979)
- Goldie and Liza Together (1980)
- Annual American Comedy Awards (1987–2001)
- A Party for Richard Pryor (1991)
- The First Annual Comedy Hall of Fame (1993)
- Sinatra: 80 Years My Way (1995)
- Caesars Palace 30th Anniversary Celebration (1996)
- The American Film Institute Salute to Dustin Hoffman (1999)
- The American Film Institute Salute to Harrison Ford (2000)

=== Producer ===
- Victor Borge's Twentieth Anniversary Special (1961)
- The Dinah Shore Chevy Show (1962)
- The Judy Garland Show (1963)
- TCB - Diana Ross and The Supremes / The Temptations (1968)
- The Fabulous Funnies (1968)
- G.I.T. on Broadway - Diana Ross and The Supremes / The Temptations (1969)
- The New Bill Cosby Show (1972)
- Cher (1975)
- John Denver and Friend (1976)
- The Shirley MacLaine Special: Where Do We Go from Here? (1977)
- The Goldie Hawn Special (1978)
- Salute to Lady Liberty (1984)
- Las Vegas: An All-Star 75th Anniversary (1987)
- Frank, Liza, and Sammy: The Ultimate Event (1989)
- Sammy Davis Jr. 60th Anniversary Celebration (1990)
- Muhammad Ali's 50th Birthday Celebration (1992)

=== Director ===
- The Dinah Shore Special: Like Hep (1969)
- Comedy Club (1987)
- Frank, Liza, and Sammy: The Ultimate Event (1989)
- Rowan & Martin's Laugh-In: 25th Anniversary Reunion (1993)

== Filmography ==
A partial listing of films that he produced and/or directed follows.

- Fire and Ice (1987)
- Norman... Is That You? (1976)

== Awards and honors ==
Between 1968 and 1996, Schlatter was nominated for 15 Emmy Awards, winning twice for Rowan & Martin's Laugh-In as Outstanding Musical or Variety Program (1968) and for Sammy Davis Jr. 60th Anniversary Celebration as Outstanding Variety, Music or Comedy Special (1990). He was also nominated for a Writers Guild of America award in 1997. For his work on television, Schlatter has a star on the Hollywood Walk of Fame at 7030 Hollywood Blvd.
