= Swisher Sweets =

Cigar brand

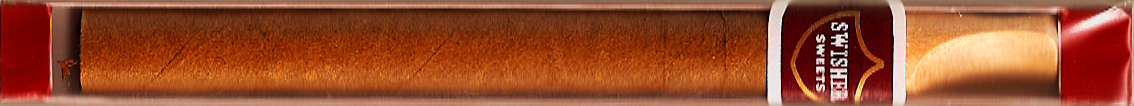
- An individual woodtip Swisher Sweets cigarillo
- Product type: Cigarillo
- Produced by: Swisher International Group
- Country: United States
- Introduced: 1959; 67 years ago Jacksonville, Florida, U.S.
- Website: swishersweets.com

Swisher Sweets is a cigar brand manufactured by Swisher, formerly Swisher International Inc. Their headquarters in Jacksonville, Florida was established in 1959.

Swisher Sweets cigars were first introduced in 1958 and are now available in varying tastes and blends.

A 2018 study published in the journal Drug and Alcohol Dependence noted Swisher Sweets as a brand "valued in blunt making" by marijuana users.

== Lawsuit ==
Swisher Sweets was involved in a lawsuit in 2016 in which Swisher International was fined $84.6 million for anticompetitive business practices.

== Products ==
Swisher Sweets products include:

- Swisher Sweets Classics: Available in different blend including Original, Diamonds, Green Sweets, Mango, Black, Strawberry, Grape, Peach, Blueberry, Chocolate and Tropical Fusion.
- Swisher Sweets Encore Edition: Blends include Sticky Sweets, Banana Smash, Wild Rush, Arctic Ice, and White Grape.
- Swisher Sweets Limited Edition: Only available for a limited time in blends including Sweet Cream, Swerve, Coastal Cocktail, Coco Blue, Boozy Watermelon, Maui Pineapple, Cherry Dynamite and Purple Swish.
- Swisher Sweets Minis: Available in blends including Original, Green Sweets, Diamonds, Island Bash, Sticky Sweets, Grape, Tropical Storm, and Blueberry.
- Swisher Sweets BLK: Flavors include Smooth, Grape, Cherry, Berry, and Wine.
- Swisher Sweets: Available in Original, Mellow, Sweet Cherry, Grape, Peach, Full Blend, and Menthol.
