= Silent Show =

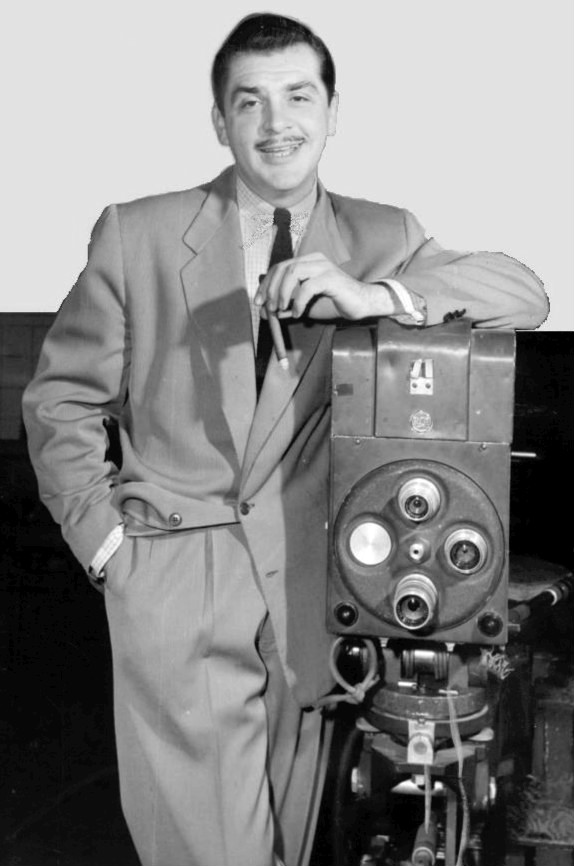
- Ernie Kovacs on the set of his television show-1956.
- Also known as: Eugene, Saturday Color Carnival: The Ernie Kovacs show
- Genre: Comedy
- Created by: Ernie Kovacs
- Written by: Ernie Kovacs
- Starring: Ernie Kovacs
- Country of origin: United States
- Original language: English
- No. of episodes: 1 episode

Production
- Running time: 30 minutes

Original release
- Network: NBC
- Release: January 19, 1957

Silent Show is a 1957 American half-hour television comedy special created by and starring Ernie Kovacs. It was broadcast on NBC, and was selected by the United States as the only television program screened at the 1958 World's Fair in Brussels.

In 1961 Kovacs restaged and expanded the Silent Show's "Eugene" sketch for the ABC network.

== Background ==
In 1956 NBC wanted to present to the viewing public an example of the new technology of color television, and they hired Ernie Kovacs to write and star in one of the first color television shows to be broadcast. Although NBC was more interested in the "visual splendor" of what would be shown, Kovacs went one step further and, aside from his opening monologue and the Dutch Masters cigar commercials, decided to banish all human conversation from the show.

NBC had another reason for this special: a hole in its lineup on a particular Saturday night. After Jerry Lewis broke up his longtime partnership with Dean Martin, NBC had offered Lewis the opportunity to host his own ninety-minute color TV special 9:30–11 pm (EST) on Saturday, January 19, 1957. Lewis decided to use only the first sixty minutes, which left the network with thirty minutes to fill. No one could be found to take over a time slot following the solo television premiere of a comedy superstar, other than Kovacs, who was more than willing to try something new. In an interview prior to the show's airing, Kovacs described his work as "radio in reverse", saying that radio provided dialogue, leaving listeners to use imagination to fill in the visual details. In presenting a silent half-hour with Eugene, he supplied the pictures and left the dialogue up to the viewer's imagination.

Kovacs began the show with this:

There's a great deal of conversation that takes place on television. From way in the morning 6 AM... to all hours of the night. I thought perhaps... you might like to spend a half hour without hearing any dialogue at all.

The NBC version aired live; a second version of the show was created on B&W videotape and broadcast November 10, 1961, on the ABC network. An excerpt of the color show was aired as part of the NBC 50th Anniversary Special in 1976.

When Kovacs outlined his plan for a 30-minute silent broadcast to NBC, the network's reaction was one of disbelief. During rehearsals for the program, network executives made disparaging remarks. Kovacs became angry and walked out, telling them to show a western film they had in reserve instead; he was then able to proceed as he wanted. Kovacs' wife, Edie Adams, recalled that this experience was the reason Ernie wrote the novel Zoomar.

== Summary ==
Kovacs as Eugene. The milk camera trick as seen by television viewers.

Excluding Kovacs' opening monologue, commercials, and closing credits, the main body of the show runs about twenty minutes. Kovacs played "Eugene", a bumbling character he had created during his 1956 stint as a continuing guest host of Tonight Starring Steve Allen, filling in for Allen on Monday and Tuesday nights. A case can be made that this show is actually called Eugene, because that word is the title that appears when the main part of the show starts.

Within the show, no one talks. Eugene unwittingly annoys the people around him with his noisy antics. He is befuddled by simple activities that don't turn out quite right, yet he can perform actions that seem magical with little effort. Sets are minimal.

Kovacs at rehearsal. The tilted set is visible.

Eugene draws a table and lamp on a blank wall and is puzzled when the drawn light won't turn on, until it dawns on him to draw a power outlet with a plugged-in electrical cord leading to the lamp — and the drawn bulb lights up. Books on a library shelf are filled with sound: War and Peace is all cannons and gunfire, until Eugene finds, at the end of the volume, a live dove, which flies away; the pages of Camille cough; removing the volume of The Old Man and the Sea from the shelf causes a flood of water.

Sight gags, sound effects, and musical montages abound, as do intriguing possibilities of what's possible with the new combined technology of color, sound, film cuts, and video effects. A repairman works with a screwdriver on thin air, and, when done, flips an invisible switch — a television screen (showing, of course, a western) materializes out of nowhere, then vanishes when the repairman flips the unseen switch off. Marble statues come to life, then crumble to pieces. A maid sucks up pieces of crumpled paper with an invisible vacuum cleaner.

Throughout, Eugene, at worst, is only mildly perplexed—at least until the end, when, seated at the side of a long table, he finds that gravity is now somehow tilted: the contents of his lunchbox keep rolling away, a plumb-bobbed plum is at an angle off vertical, and milk from a thermos misses the cup directly below it.

== Critical reception ==
In 1957, Ernie Kovacs received the Sylvania Award for his work on the 1957 NBC special.

As a result of the publicity for this special, Kovacs received a movie offer from Columbia Pictures, resulting in his role in the movie Operation Mad Ball, and appeared on the cover of the April 15, 1957 issue of Life magazine.

In 1962, Kovacs and his co-director, Joe Behar, received the Directors Guild of America Award for the second version of this program shown over the ABC network.

== Bibliography ==
- Greene, Doyle (2007). Politics and the American Television Comedy: A Critical Survey from I Love Lucy through South Park. McFarland. ISBN 978-1-476-60829-7.
- Spigel, Lynn (2009). TV by design: modern art and the rise of network television. University of Chicago Press. ISBN 978-0-226-76968-4.

== Sources ==
- Newcomb, Horace & Museum of Broadcast Communications (2004) "Encyclopedia of Television" CRC Press, ISBN 1-57958-394-6, pp. 1286–1287
