= Turnianska Nová Ves =

Turnianska Nová Ves Tornaújfalu
- Municipality
- Flag

- Location of Turnianska Nová Ves in the Košice Region Location of Turnianska Nová Ves in Slovakia
- Coordinates: 48.58°N 20.90°E
- Country: Slovakia
- Region: Košice Region
- District: Košice-okolie District
- First mentioned: 1406

Area
  - Total: 6.42 km^{2} (2.48 sq mi)
- Elevation: 172 m (564 ft)

Population (2025)
  - Total: 287
- Time zone: UTC+1 (CET)
  - Summer (DST): UTC+2 (CEST)
- Postal code: 440 4
- Area code: +421 55
- Vehicle registration plate (until 2022): KS
- Website: www.turnianskanovaves.sk

Turnianska Nová Ves (Slovak pronunciation: [ˈturɲɪɐnska ˈnɔʋaː ˈʋes]; Hungarian: Tornaújfalu) is a village and municipality in the Greater Košice District in the Košice Region of eastern Slovakia.

== History ==
The village was first mentioned in historical records in 1406.

== Geography ==
The municipality lies at an altitude of 172 metres (564 ft) and covers an area of 6.42 km^{2} (2.48 sq mi) (2025).

== Population ==
Population statistic (10 years)
| Year | 1995 | 2005 | 2015 | 2025 |
|---|---|---|---|---|
| Count | 370 | 362 | 341 | 287 |
| Difference | | −2.16% | −5.80% | −15.83% |

Population statistic
| Year | 2024 | 2025 |
|---|---|---|
| Count | 291 | 287 |
| Difference | | −1.37% |

It has a population of 287 people (31 December 2025).

=== Ethnicity ===
Census 2021 (1+ %)
| Ethnicity | Number | Fraction |
|---|---|---|
| Hungarian | 263 | 85.38% |
| Slovak | 59 | 19.15% |
| Not found out | 7 | 2.27% |
| Total | 308 | |

In year 2021 was 308 people by ethnicity 263 as Hungarian, 59 as Slovak and 7 as Not found out.

Note on population: The difference values of population numbers in the table "Population statistic" and in the sections "Ethnicity" & "Religion" is caused by the use of various statistical methods.

=== Religion ===
Census 2021 (1+ %)
| Religion | Number | Fraction |
|---|---|---|
| Roman Catholic Church | 210 | 68.18% |
| Calvinist Church | 54 | 17.53% |
| None | 17 | 5.52% |
| Greek Catholic Church | 13 | 4.22% |
| Jehovah's Witnesses | 6 | 1.95% |
| Evangelical Church | 5 | 1.62% |
| Total | 308 | |

In year 2021 was 308 people by religion 210 from Roman Catholic Church, 54 from Calvinist Church, 17 from None, 13 from Greek Catholic Church, 6 from Jehovah's Witnesses, 5 from Evangelical Church and 3 from Not found out.
