= Frontier Times =

Texas magazine and journal from 1910 to 1985

The Frontier Times
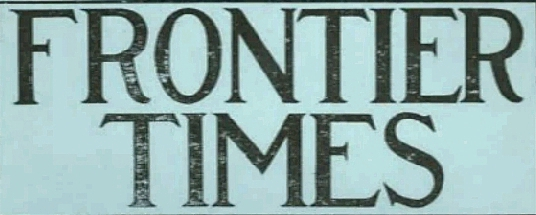
- Editor and publisher: J. Marvin Hunter (1910–1957)
- Staff writers: Joe Austell Small; Norm Wiltsey; Robert L. Evans; Randy Clarke
- Categories: Bibliography and magazine
- Format: Print and Typloid
- Publisher: J. Marvin Hunter, and J. Warren Hunter
- Founder: J. Marvin Hunter; John Warren Hunter
- Founded: 1910
- First issue: 1910
- Final issue: 1985 as The Frontier Times
- Company: Hunter's Frontier, True West
- Country: United States
- Based in: Bandera, Texas
- Language: English
- ISSN: 0016-2124
- OCLC: 197817510

The Frontier Times (or Hunters Frontier Magazine) was an American journal and magazine devoted to history of the American West and Texas. Before it ceased publication, it was published in many locations at Texas.

== The magazine ==
It was founded by two enthusiastic historians, John Warren Hunter and his son J. Marvin Hunter, in 1910 as Hunter's Magazine. Most of Hunter's contributions were initially published.

The publication was later relocated to Ozona in April 1912; and in June 1912, the magazine announced it was relocating its publication to San Antonio. Some years later, the Hunters encountered difficulties due to lack of support & low subscriber count. In May 1916, Hunter founded the Frontier Magazine, published in Melvin till 1917. Hunter's magazines started as a publishing company in San Antonio and gaining popularity, it was labeled with the Texas Historic Landmarks Association and the official organ of the Old Time Trail Drivers Association in August 2020. The magazine later suspended publication without notice and it proved to be the last issue of Hunters Magazine due to inadequate finances and low circulation. The first issue of The Frontier Times was published in October 1923 at Bandera.

Through some years of writing, Hunter himself found to be in some instances the names and date might not be correct but the articles are true in details. Hunter's family mostly assisted him in his magazine's printing and in March 1946, Marvin Hunter, Jnr started publication in Baird and his father Hunter Snr continues the edition in Bandera. In 1953 the publication moved to Grand Prairie and became a quarterly. The last publication by Hunter's family was in October 1954.

== The Frontier Times Western publication ==
Western publication owned by Joe Austell Small purchased The Frontier Times in 1955 suspending all publications till the ending of 1957 when it was published and edited by Norm Wiltsey under Walter Prescott Webb of the Handbook of Texas making differences from the magazine only in title labeled as companion to True West. Walter Prescott Webb was a historical consultant, in winter 1959 the editor and also publisher was Joe Small. Pat Wagner was later the publisher and editor of Frontier in 1962 as it became four months and bimonthly in December. Later at the beginning of 1972, West Publication published facsimiles of Marvin Hunter's earlier Hunter Times and was published at Wisconsin in 1979 to 1981, it suspended it publication in 1982 and resumed to published at Stillwater, Oklahoma in October 1984 edited by John Joerschke and Robert L. Evans published Frontier in 1984 and April 1985 after the editorial body overall is Randy Clark.

Hunter himself published only a few of hundred copies of Frontier but the magazine had reached a circulation of up to 105,000 in November 1985 as stories of Indians, train robberies, cowboys, ghost town treasure and gold mines were all covered.

The Frontier Times was described as having great historical value "and worthy of being preserved in libraries of the country" by Webb, the True West, Old West and Companion publication continued the publication at Stillwater, Oklahoma, and The Frontier Times ceased publishing in November 1985.

== During Hunter's edition ==
Requests were made for copies during Marvin Hunter's edition and its original documents that deal with the history of settlers, cattlemen, observer of events in Texas and pioneers periodically of Texas history of ones alive and still able to tell their stories making it one of the most valuable assets of the magazine, all the article are largely written from point of eye witness and observer before the generation of those settlers passed on and had sought to gather as much their testimonies to published. Hunter had built the Frontier Times Museum at Bandera, Texas in 1953 before his demise, a place serving as the historical museum of the articles of Frontier Times Magazine.

== Bibliography ==
- John Marvin Hunter, Peregrinations of a Pioneer Printer: An Autobiography - Grand Prairie, Texas: Frontier Times, 1954.
- Handbook of Texas Online, Ann Graham Gaines. FRONTIER TIMES, accessed July 15, 2020
