= Dutch Masters (cigar) =

Tobacco cigar brand

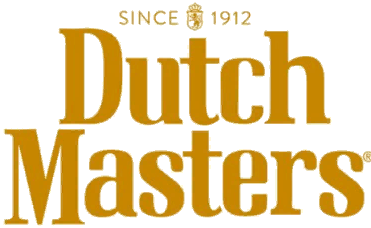

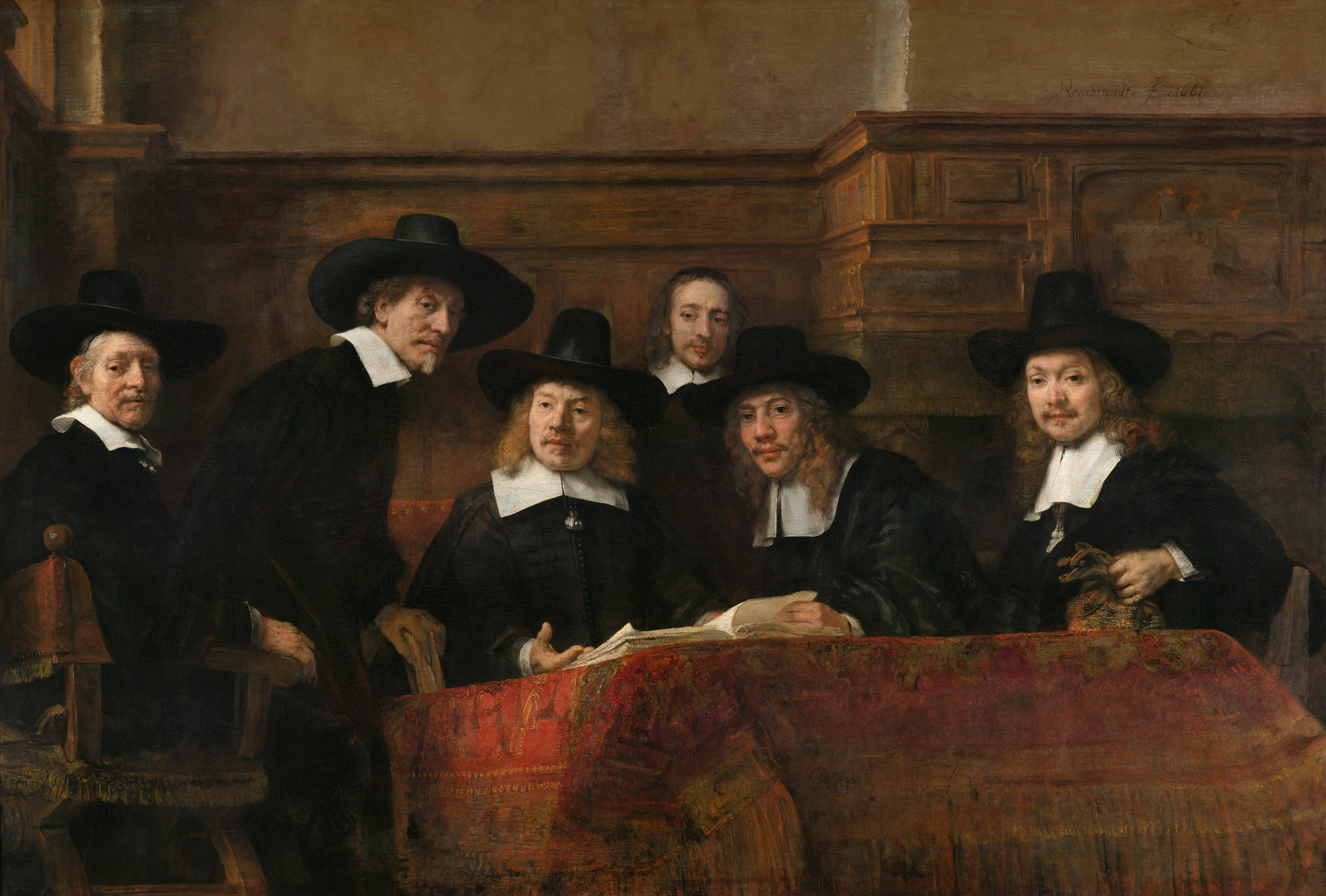
- Syndics of the Drapers' Guild painting by Rembrandt, featured on DM packages
- Product type: Cigar
- Current owner: Imperial Brands
- Produced by: ITG Brands
- Introduced: 1912; 114 years ago
- Markets: United States
- Website: dutchmasters.com

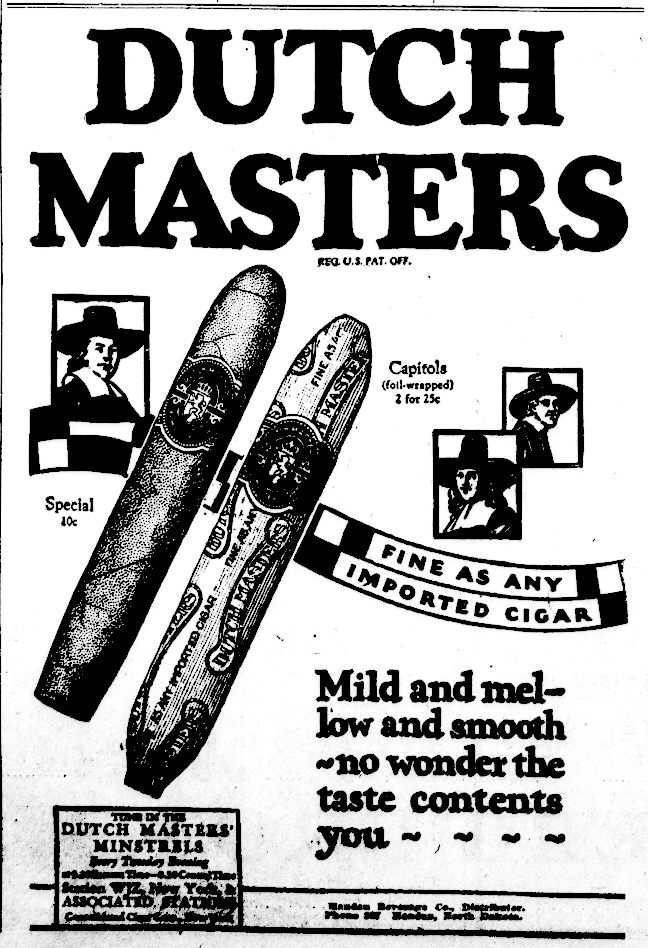
1928 ad for the brand

Dutch Masters is an American brand of natural-wrapped cigars that has been sold since 1912. Its distinctive packaging features Rembrandt's 1662 painting Syndics of the Drapers' Guild. Dutch Masters cigars are manufactured and sold by Imperial Brands. They are machine-rolled cigars and are available as standard cigars and as smaller cigarillos.

== History ==
G.H. Johnson Cigar Company was the original producer of the Dutch Masters cigar brand. The brand became a mainstay of the Consolidated Cigar Corporation, which merged the G.H. Johnson Cigar Company and six others in 1921. The Consolidated Cigar Corp. later became part of Altadis, formed in 1999 by a merger of the French and Spanish state tobacco monopolies. Through its history the Dutch Masters cigar brand has become one of the most popular and profitable cigar brands in America.

Dutch Masters became well known in the late 1950s and early 1960s for its sponsorship of television comedian Ernie Kovacs. He was appreciative of Dutch Masters' allowing him nearly complete creative freedom in the production of their sponsored shows and commercials. Kovacs smoked cigars, but never smoked Dutch Masters off camera, preferring Havana cigars.

== Varieties ==
- Belvedere
- Cameroon Elite
- Corona De Luxe
- 227 Benedict
- Corona Grape
- Corona Maduro
- Corona Sports
- Corona Strawberry
- Corona Vanilla
- Creme de Menthe
- Honey Sports
- Honey Sports Cigarillos
- Vanilla Sports
- Panetela
- Perfecto
- President
- Cigarillos - Chocolate
- Cigarillos - Cognac
- Cigarillos - Grape
- Cigarillos - Green
- Cigarillos - White Grape
- Cigarillos - Silver
- Cigarillos - Strawberry
- Cigarillos - Vanilla
- Cigarillos - Sweet
- Cigarillos - Wine
- Cigarillos - Red Berry
- Cigarillos - Honeycomb
- Cigarillos - Bluedream fusion
- Cigarillos - Atomic Fusion
- Cigarillos - Berry Fusion
- Cigarillos - Irish Fusion
- Palma
- Palma Chocolate
- Palma Cognac
- Tube Cigarillos Cognac
- Tube Cigarillos Grape
- Tube Cigarillos Vanilla
- Tube Cigarillos Vanilla Sport
- White Grape
