= Phillies (cigar) =

American cigar brand

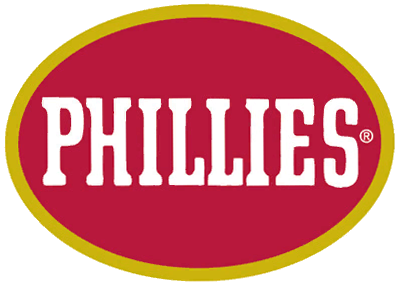
- Product type: Cigar
- Current owner: Imperial Brands
- Produced by: ITG Brands
- Country: United States
- Introduced: 1910; 116 years ago
- Markets: United States

Phillies is a brand of cigar in the United States. They were originally made in Philadelphia, Pennsylvania, from which the brand takes its name. Phillies cigars, originally produced by Bayuk Cigars, Inc., are presently manufactured by ITG Brands, the American subsidiary of British conglomerate Imperial Brands.

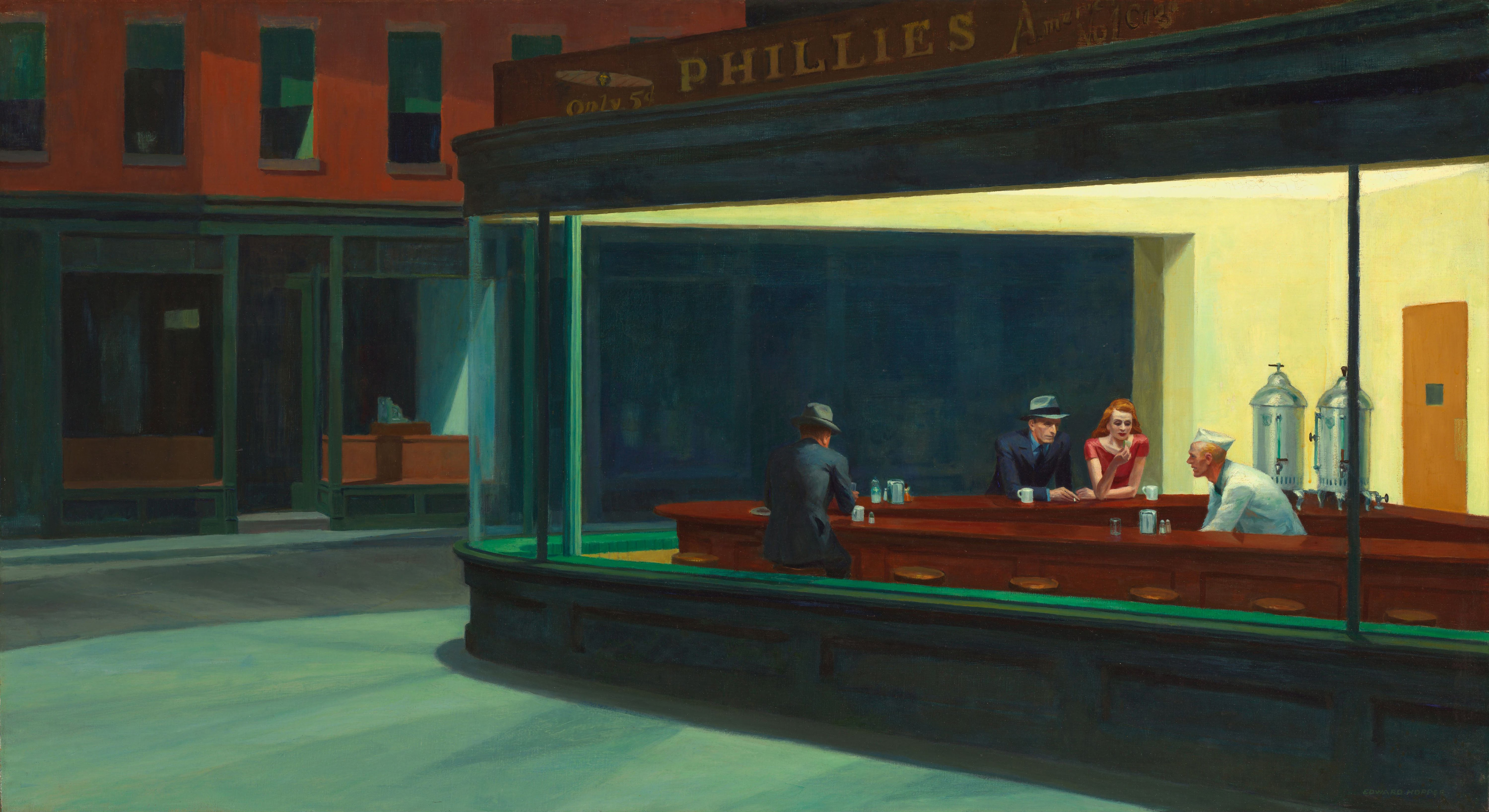
Nighthawks, 1942 painting by Edward Hopper, portrayed people in a downtown diner late at night, with a "Phillies" advertising (reads "American № 1 cigar")

The original cigar, introduced by the Bayuk brothers in 1910, was named the "Philadelphia Hand Made" and often shortened by the smoking public to "Phillies", a nickname that eventually became the brand name. Phillies sizes include Black Max, Blunt, Cheroot, Cigarillo, Mexicali Slim, Mini Blunt, Panatella, Perfecto, Sweet, Tip, Titan and Phillies Finest.

Phillies Blunt flavors include banana, berry, chocolate aroma, coffee, coconut, cognac, greene de menthe, honey, mango, peach, piña colada, rum, sambuca, sour apple, strawberry, sweet vanilla, sugar, tequila, watermelon, grape, and cinnamon. Barrel O' Blunt cigars are Phillies Blunts packaged in 50-pack "barrels".

The Phillies cigar features in Edward Hopper's painting, Nighthawks, in which a diner is topped by an advertisement for Phillies along with an illustration of a cigar above the words "Only 5¢."

Single cylinders of Phillies cigars are generally hard to find because usually come in packs of five and boxes of fifty.
