= RAW (rolling papers) =

American corporation

- Type: Private
- Industry: Rolling papers; Food, Beverage, Tobacco; Manufacturing
- Founded: 1995; 31 years ago
- Founder: Josh Kesselman
- Headquarters: Phoenix, Arizona
- Area served: United States; Canada; Europe; Africa
- Number of employees: 2000 (2018)
- Website: Rawthentic.com

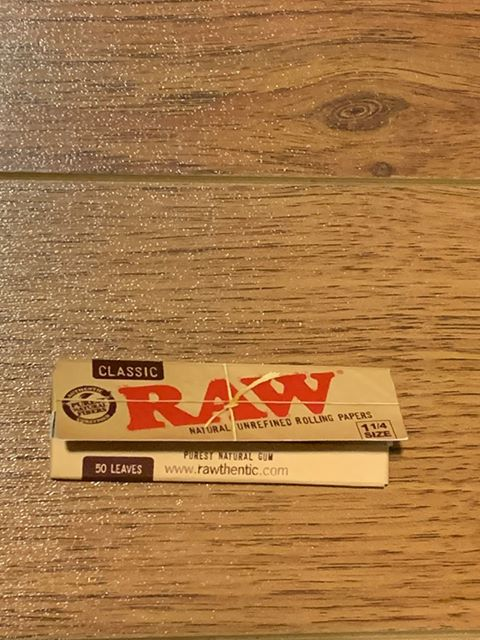
Package of RAW 1 1/4 size classic rolling papers.

RAW is a brand of rolling papers created in 1995 by Josh Kesselman. Rolling papers are designed to be used for smoking cannabis. RAW filters and hand-rolling machines are also products from the same brand.

== History ==
=== 1993–2004 ===
While in college, Josh Kesselman researched opening a "very small" smoke shop as part of a project. At the time, he was also trading rolling papers with collectors in Europe. After receiving an 'A' on the project, he decided to open the store in real life.

In 1993, after graduating and selling all of his possessions, except for a $500 van and a self-built Harley Davidson, Kesselman was able to start a smoke shop named Knuckleheads in Gainesville, Florida. He imported specialty rolling papers from Europe and sold smoking paraphernalia, such as pipes and bongs. He was able to charge higher premiums because his customers wanted the rare rolling papers.

In 1996, Kesselman accidentally sold a bong to a woman whose father worked for the US government. Kesselman was raided and placed under house arrest. Many of his products were confiscated, except for his rolling papers as those were not illegal. Later that year, Kesselman moved to Arizona to start a smoke shop supply and distribution company called HBI.

Around that time, Kesselman met the owner of a rolling paper factory in the Alicante province of Spain, where papers had been produced since around 1765. The owner was looking for a new customer to help create and sell new products. Through the partnership Kesselman developed two brands, Juicy Jay's, which are flavored papers, and Elements, which is a brand of rice papers.

=== 2004–present ===
After opening his store in 1993, Kesselman realized that the market was lacking natural unbleached papers. These papers, Kesselman believed, would improve the smoking experience because they would not alter the flavor of whatever was smoked. In 2004, he made a $1 million investment to a supplier of natural, less processed and unbleached base paper, which could be made into "vegan" unbleached rolling papers in booklets. The concept was successful and RAW became the first company to offer "vegan" unbleached papers. In 2005, RAW fully launched its first line of rolling papers. The paper was made from unbleached plants and was free of chemicals, additives, and dyes.

Around 2008, hip-hop artists started using RAW and sharing it with their friends. At the same time, people were looking for a better smoking experience. This helped the brand grow. It is sold across the U.S., and the company has offices in the U.S., Canada, and Europe. During the coronavirus pandemic, demand for RAW's products tripled. In 2023, the company clarified its Organic Hemp rolling papers are made in Benimarfull, a village in the Alicante Providence of Spain using unbleached certified organic hemp milled from mills in Southern France. In August 2023, the company created the RAW Seeds Fellowship for "legacy cannabis operators who built the cannabis industry."

In an article from April 2025, Forbes referenced that RAW is the #1 in total dollar sales in the Rolling Papers & Accessories category in the U.S. According to an article in The New Yorker, when a half-billion-dollar offer came in for RAW's parent company, Kesselman "didn't even consider it."

RAW was featured in an article for High Times that focused on Josh Kesselman's inclusion on the Forbes fifth-annual Cannabis 42.0 list.

== Manufacturing ==
The papers are produced in a variety of styles and sizes. These papers are made from unbleached and less processed plant fibers, which gives them a unique texture and a natural brown color. RAW papers also use a water-based gum. The base sheet production in the mill involves blending the fibers, creating a pulp, drying the paper, and inspecting it for quality. Something that sets RAW rolling papers apart from other brands is a unique watermark. The watermark is created by pressing and rolling the paper between two metal rollers with constant pressure, which leaves a distinctive pattern on the paper. The additional process required in creating the watermark brings changes to the density of the paper.

== Products ==
RAW's paper products come in different types, including classic and organic. The papers do not contain chemical whiteners. Additionally, the vegan papers do not contain animal products including dye, some of which can be made with lactose, and the gum line is a plant-based adhesive. Some of the products include:

- King Size Slim Organic Hemp
- Classic
- King Size
- 1 ¼ Organic
- Classic Natural Unbleached Pre Rolled Cones
- Organic Rolling Paper 5 Meter rolls
- Ultra-thin Ethereal rolling papers and cones
- Black Natural Unbleached King Size Slim Rolling Papers

Accessories also sold by RAW include:

- Rolling machine
- Filter tips
- Pre-rolled filter tips
- Loader
- Rolling tray
- Rolling kit
- Organic hemp wick
- Lighter

RAW founder, Josh Kesselman, designed and sells an umbrella with a slot for holding a cone and a mouthpiece so people can smoke and walk in the rain. Kesselman said that thinking of fun and eccentric products that resonate with the business is part of the joy of being in the rolling papers community.

== Activism ==
RAW commits a portion of its total sales to environmental groups such as Water is Life International, Trees for the Future, Wine to Water, CarbonFund.org, Home 'Fur' Good, and Kiva. Donations are made through the company's philanthropy initiative, RAW Giving.

== Pop culture ==
Rapper Wiz Khalifa dedicated a song to the brand, titled "Raw." The company's product has also been supported by Curren$y, 2 Chainz, Mick Jenkins, Chris Webby, Z-Ro, and Futuristic. In 2014, RAW partnered with Wiz Khalifa and he released his own line of rolling papers. Mary Schumacher of The Fresh Toast recommended RAW rolling papers to people who smoke cannabis. In 2022, they were added to the list of best rolling papers by Esquire. In 2017, RAW Black rolling papers were included on the list of best rolling papers from High Times Magazine. Dominic Vasquez, a customized shoe designer, has a RAW line of shoes. He uses RAW-themed decorations and each shoe comes with an extra set of laces made from hemp. In 2025, actor Timothée Chalamet and rapper EsDeeKid released a song dedicated to RAW rolling papers called “4 RAWS (Remix)” featuring the lyric “Every time I smoke, I light 4 RAWs”. As of 2025, the music video has over 115 million views on X.

== Legal ==
On February 9, 2023, the company that owns the RAW brand in the U.S., HBI, and rival brand Republic were involved in a court case. HBI had been accused of having misleading information regarding, among other things, all papers being made in Alcoy, Spain, the company's charitable organizations, and being the "only" provider of organic rolling papers. On June 5, 2023, the court ruled in favor with HBI regarding Republic's federal claim for false advertising, but required certain changes to HBI's advertising based on state law. The jury found that Republic had willfully infringed on RAW's packaging and marketing. HBI (RAW) was awarded $1,019,620 in June 2021; the court added "prejudgment interest" of $446,203, which brought RAWs total award to $1,465,823. After this ruling, Kesselman announced, "We intend to donate the net proceeds we will receive, now that this case is resolved, to organizations working to help small businesses in the cannabis field, particularly businesses that are startups involving individuals who were previously convicted of nonviolent cannabis related crimes."

In January 2025, Kesselman announced that HBI Innovations had been awarded more than $8.7 million in lawsuits against a group of companies that had violated the copyright of its packaging designs. On the 17th of December, 2024, the United States District Court for the District of Nevada awarded HBI more than $3 million to reflect disgorgement of wrongful profits of the Defendant (NEPA Wholesale, Inc.) for the distribution of “Brocone” products in the U.S. and over $5.6 million in statutory damages for Defendants violation of HBI's copyrights covering packaging designs.

== See also ==
- Roll-your-own
- List of rolling papers
