= E-Z Wider =

Brand of rolling papers

E-Z Wider is a brand of rolling papers introduced in 1972 by Bob Stiller and Burton Rubin. The name is derived from the 1969 film Easy Rider. The rolling papers were initially designed to be used for smoking marijuana.

== History ==
Burton Rubin came up with the idea for E-Z Wider in 1969 while attending Law School in Miami. Rubin noticed his "smoking" classmates were putting two leaves together to make double wide papers. Some time later Rubin met Bob Stiller through Rubin's then wife. In 1971, Rubin wrote to over 11 European companies in hopes of beginning production. Manufactures Jean, a company located in Santander, Spain responded. Bob Stiller invested the required funds for inventory with a loan from his father. Rubin completed negotiations with French company, Machines Chambon, to buy an interleaving machine. This allowed the company to be less dependent on one source. Stiller became responsible for accounting and manufacturing.

Initial production began in Spain and used gum arabic which contains no artificial ingredients. After 6 years of operation E-Z Wider had annual turnover of $7 million.

Robert Stiller, a founder of E-Z Wider rolling paper company, told Forbes magazine last year (1978) that a booklet of the papers cost 6 cents.

== See also ==
- Roll-your-own
- List of rolling papers
