= Pay-Pay =

Brand of cigarette rolling paper

Pay-Pay is the oldest brand of cigarette rolling paper in the world. Pay-Pay rolling papers were originally traded by Spanish sailors for cotton and tobacco in North America; this is the earliest record of a paper entering the North American market. Pay-Pay brand papers have been available for over 300 years; their packs and styles have changed greatly over this time.

== History ==
Pay-Pay rolling papers company was formed in Spain in 1703. It is the oldest rolling paper manufacturer still in operation. The company homepage states that Pay-Pay was first produced in 1764.

The "2018-2025 Cigarette Rolling Paper Report on Global and United States Market, Status and Forecast, by Players, Types and Applications" research report lists "Rizla, Pay-Pay, Zig-Zag, OCB, TOP, Bambú, Bugler, EZ Wider, Export Aquafuge, JOB, Juicy Jay's, Laramie, Raw, Rollies, Swan, Tally-Ho" as the "vital supreme players in the worldwide 2018-2025 Cigarette Rolling Paper Report on and United States market".

Pay-Pay is produced in Alcoy, Spain.

== See also ==
- Roll-your-own
- List of rolling papers
