= Republic Tobacco =

Multinational tobacco retailer

- The Republic Group logo

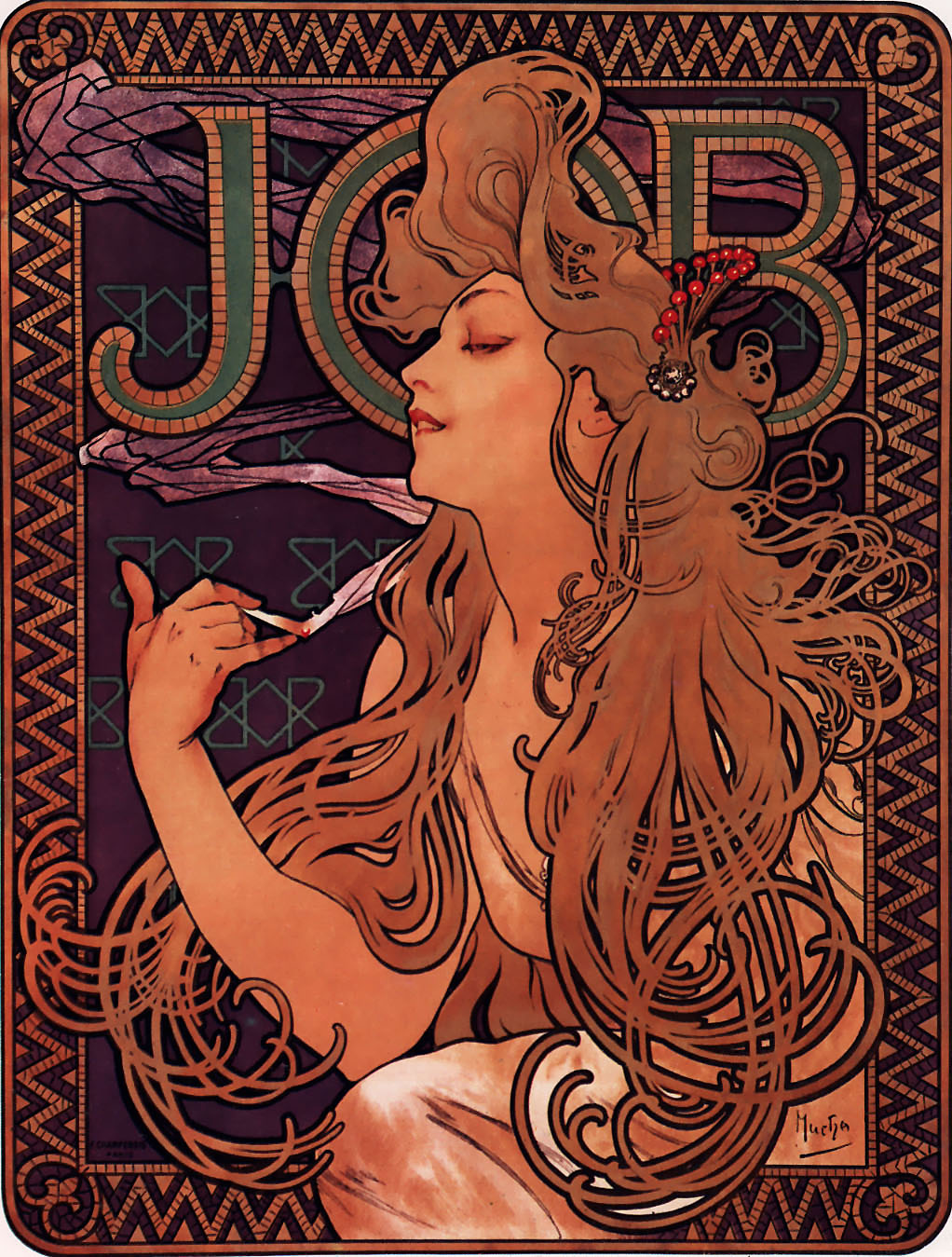
- JOB rolling papers 1896 ad (bought in 2005)
- Industry: Tobacco
- Website: www.therepublicgroup.net/eng/

Republic Tobacco LP is a multinational wholesaler, distributor, and retailer of tobacco, based in the Chicago suburb of Glenview, Illinois, United States.

Republic Tobacco is wholly owned by Republic Group (Republic Technologies LLC is the parent company), which includes the manufacturer affiliates of Top Tobacco, Republic Technologies: JOB and Odet-Cascadec-Bolloré (OCB) cigarette papers, Altesse GmbH (filter tubes), H.T.H. Tabak (cigarettes, snuff, and tobacco), and Productos Technologicos Catalanes (smoking accessories), as well as Republic Tobacco, representing a combined sales and distribution presence in more than 90 countries.

The company was founded by Donald Levin. Levin began with a small smoke shop called Adams Apple (which no longer exists).

In 1969, Levin became the U.S. distributor for JOB rolling papers. He built the brand and used the profits to purchase the TOP Tobacco Factory & Brands from R. J. Reynolds in the early 1980s.

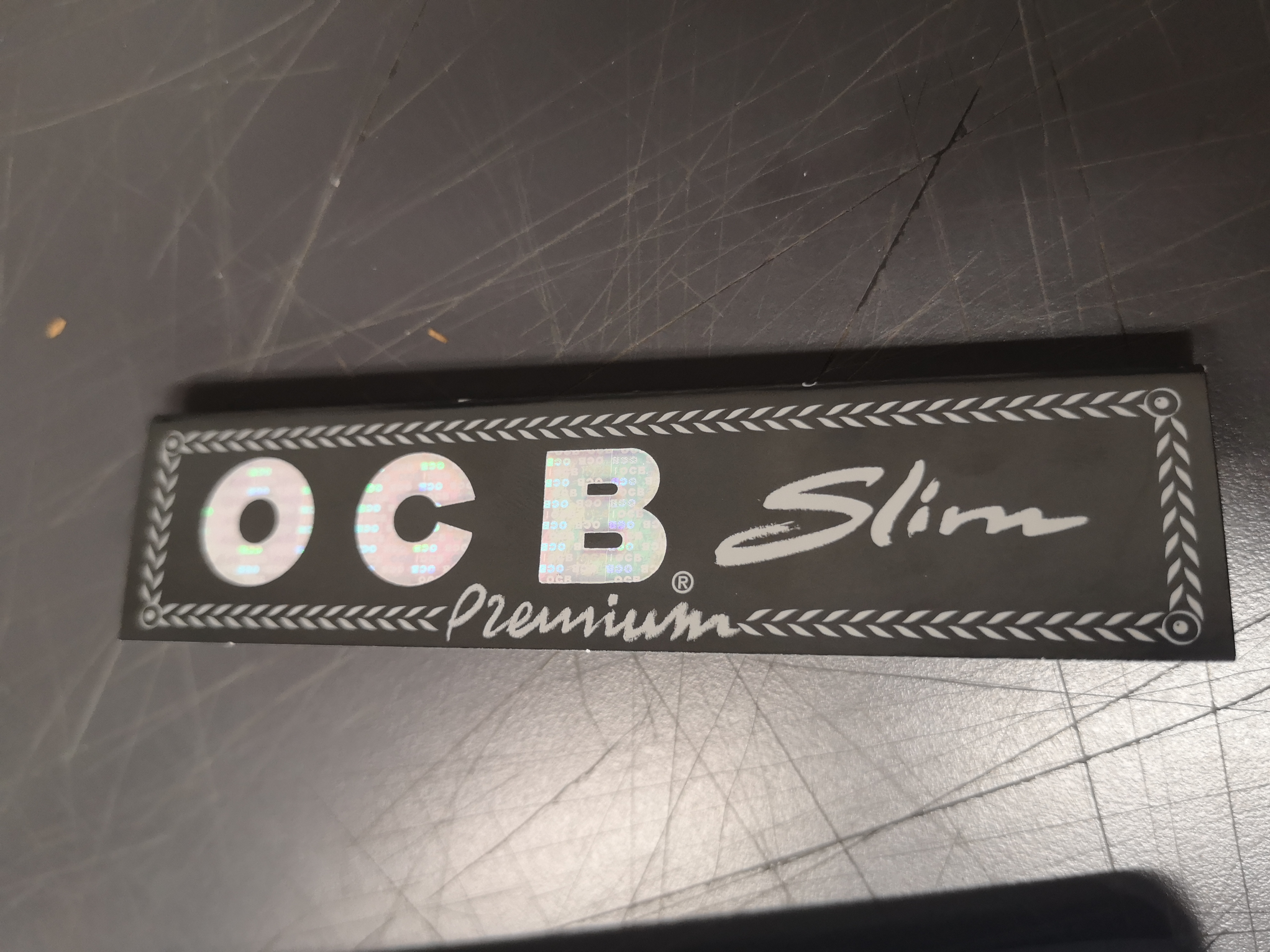
Rolling paper OCB

In July 2009, he also bought from Bolloré Papeteries du Léman and Papeteries des Vosges, two French paper mills specialized in thin papers.

He also purchased the Chicago Wolves sports team; produced many movies, including Maximum Overdrive.

== See also ==
- List of rolling papers
