= Tally-Ho (rolling papers) =

Australian brand of cigarette rolling paper

- Area served: Worldwide
- Owner: Imperial Tobacco

Tally Ho is an Australian brand of cigarette rolling paper distributed by Imperial Tobacco Australia.

== History ==
Tally Ho rolling paper is notable in that each paper offers pieces of Australian trivia.

In 2015, Tally-Ho was popular in Victorian prisons, despite a smoking ban.

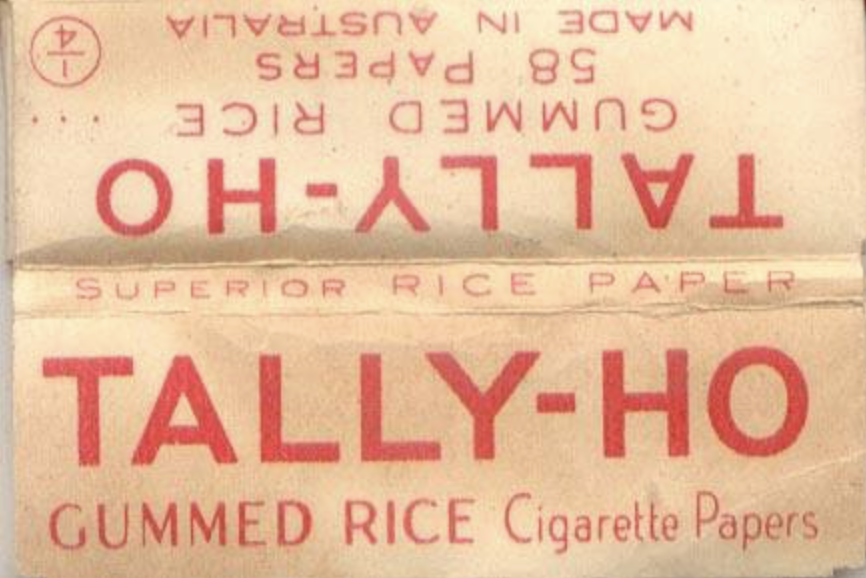

The 2018-2025 Cigarette Rolling Paper Report on Global and United States Market, Status and Forecast, by Players, shows Types and Applications" research report lists Rizla, Pay-Pay, Zig-Zag, OCB, TOP, Bambu, Bugler, EZ Wider, Export Aquafuge, JOB, Juicy Jay's, Laramie, Raw, Rollies, Swan, Tally-Ho as the "vital supreme players in the worldwide 2018-2025 Cigarette Rolling Paper Report on and the United States market.

== See also ==
- List of rolling papers
