= Bugle (disambiguation) =

The bugle is a brass musical instrument.

Bugle may also refer to:

== Places ==
- Bugle, Cornwall, a village near St Austell in the United Kingdom
  - Bugle railway station
- Bugle Field, a Baltimore, Maryland, stadium used by two primary Negro league baseball teams from 1916 to 1950
- Bugle Rock, South Bangalore, Karnataka, India

== Arts, entertainment, and media ==
=== Periodicals ===
- The Anti-Slavery Bugle, an abolitionist newspaper published from 1845 to 1861 in Ohio, U.S.
- The Baum Bugle, the official journal of The International Wizard of Oz Club
- Black Country Bugle, an English weekly newspaper
- Bugle (newspaper) or Bugle-American, an underground newspaper during the 1970s in Wisconsin, U.S.
- The Bugle, a newspaper that merged into the Bugle-Observer, based in Woodstock, New Brunswick, Canada

=== Other arts, entertainment, and media ===
- Bingville Bugle, a fictional newspaper created by America humorist Newton Newkirk
- The Bugle, satirical podcast created by John Oliver and Andy Zaltzman
- Daily Bugle, a fictitious newspaper in the Marvel Comics universe

== Other uses ==
- Bugle or bugleweed, a common name of the flowering plant genus Ajuga
- Boulton & Paul Bugle, a British biplane bomber first flown in 1923
- Bugles (snack), corn chip snack
- Bugle Boy, a former American clothing manufacturer and retailer
- The Bugle, Wikipedia's military history newsletter

== See also ==
- Bugler (disambiguation)
- Bugel, surname
- Bugling, a sound made by a bull elk
- Ngöbe Buglé people, an indigenous people of Panama
- The Buggles, English new wave band formed 1977
