= Bugler (tobacco) =

American tobacco brand

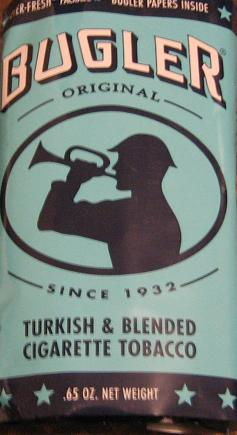
A 0.65 oz pouch of Bugler tobacco.

Bugler is a roll-your-own brand of tobacco and rolling papers. The Bugler brand was first introduced in the United States in 1932 by Lane Limited. Lane became a subsidiary of Scandinavian Tobacco Group in 2011. According to recent market surveys, Bugler is the second highest selling brand of rolling tobacco in the United States, competing heavily with the brand TOP.

Each pouch of Bugler includes 0.65 oz. tobacco and 32 cigarette papers. Bugler differentiates itself from its chief competitors in that its tobacco consists of a premium "Turkish and domestic blend", which is similar to the same claim advertised by the higher-priced factory made brand Camel.

== See also ==
- List of rolling papers
