= Lacap =

Lacap is a given name and a surname. Notable people with the name include:

== Given name ==
- Tedy Lacap Bruschi (born 1973), American former professional football player and three-time Super Bowl champion

== Surname ==
- Donnabella Lacap-Bugler, Filipino–New Zealand academic microbiologist and professor at the Auckland University of Technology
- Lorifel Lacap-Pahimna (born 1961), Filipino associate justice of the Sandiganbayan
- Rody Lacap (born 1950), Filipino cinematographer
