= Nwadiuto Esiobu =

Nigerian-American academic

Nwadiuto Esiobu is a professor of microbiology and biotechnology at Florida Atlantic University. She is also a Jefferson Science Fellow, known for her work on microbiomes, the bio-economy, and as a one-health expert.

== Education ==
Esiobu studied microbiology at the University of Benin (Nigeria), and in 1981 graduated with a Bachelor of Science (Hons). She proceeded to the University of Ife (now Obafemi Awolowo University) where she obtained a Master of Science in Environmental Biology. She obtained a postgraduate certificate in agronomic science from the University of Louvain, LLN, Belgium in 1985. In 1988, she earned a Ph.D. in microbiology from the University of Louvain. In 1993, she completed a postdoctoral training in Biotechnology, Plant Tissue Culture, University of Louvain, LLN, Belgium. And, in 1996, she completed another postdoctoral training in Molecular Biology, at the Massachusetts Institute of Technology.

== Career ==
Esiobu serves as Professor of Microbiology and Biotechnology in the Department of Biological Sciences, Florida Atlantic University.

Esiobu is the General Secretary and Trustee, Applied Microbiology International (AMI).

In addition to her multiple roles, she is also the founder and CEO, Applied Biotech Inc. USA / Applied Biotech Intl. Nigeria Ltd, a company that is focused on microbial solutions for agriculture, health and environmental sustainability.

== Research ==
She is known for her work in molecular microbial ecology, microbiome research, and sustainable biotechnology, with a focus on environmental and public health applications. Her research includes investigating bacteria found in the sand of Florida beaches, and effective means to de-contaminate hospitals after exposure to patients with infectious diseases. She has also examined bacterial growth on devices worn by people.

== Selected publications ==
- Esiobu, Nwadiuto; Armenta, Lisa; Ike, Joseph (2002). "Antibiotic resistance in soil and water environments". International Journal of Environmental Health Research. 12 (2): 133–144. Bibcode:2002IJEHR..12..133E. doi:10.1080/09603120220129292. ISSN 0960-3123. PMID 12396530.
- Bonilla, Tonya D.; Nowosielski, Kara; Cuvelier, Marie; Hartz, Aaron; Green, Melissa; Esiobu, Nwadiuto; McCorquodale, Donald S.; Fleisher, Jay M.; Rogerson, Andrew (2007-09-01). "Prevalence and distribution of fecal indicator organisms in South Florida beach sand and preliminary assessment of health effects associated with beach sand exposure". Marine Pollution Bulletin. 54 (9): 1472–1482. Bibcode:2007MarPB..54.1472B. doi:10.1016/j.marpolbul.2007.04.016. ISSN 0025-326X. PMID 17610908.
- Hartz, A.; Cuvelier, M.; Nowosielski, K.; Bonilla, T. D.; Green, M.; Esiobu, N.; McCorquodale, D.S.; Rogerson, A. (2008). "Survival Potential of Escherichia coli and Enterococci in Subtropical Beach Sand: Implications for Water Quality Managers". Journal of Environmental Quality. 37 (3): 898–905. Bibcode:2008JEnvQ..37..898H. doi:10.2134/jeq2007.0312. ISSN 0047-2425. PMID 18453412.

== Honors and awards ==
Diuto Esiobu was one of the speakers at the African Economic Conference 2024, which was held in Gaborone, Botswana.

She received the American Society for Microbiology (ASM) International Professor Award and was acknowledged for her outstanding service to the International Education Committee of the ASM.

She was a speaker and also the chair, Bioresources and Bioproducts Workshop, Global Bio-economy Summit 2020.

In 2011 Esiobu was selected by the National Academy of Sciences to serve as a Jefferson Science Fellow where she focused on issues within the Office of Global Food Security. In 2014 she was named to the inaugural group of Carnegie African Diaspora Fellows, and position she received again in 2017.
