= Smoking (rolling paper) =

Brand of rolling papers

- A pack of king size Smoking Slim rolling papers.
- Product type: Rolling paper
- Current owner: Miquel y Costas & Miquel, S.A.
- Country: Spain
- Introduced: 1879; 147 years ago
- Website: smokingpaper.com

Smoking is a brand of rolling paper, founded in 1924 in Capellades (Barcelona). It is owned by Miquel y Costas, a Spanish company specialized in the manufacture of rolling paper booklets and other products such as filters, tubes or accessories.

== History ==
1725 is the earliest documented reference of this company. It was not until almost 100 years later that the Miquel family started specializing in cigarette paper. In 1868 the brothers Lorenzo and Antonio Miquel y Costas began to manufacture cigarette paper and in 1879 "El Pino" was born, considered the predecessor brand of Smoking. Also that year, the company moved production to La Pobla de Claramunt and founded the company Miquel y Costas Hermanos.

In 1929, the company was incorporated and took its present name, Miquel y Costas & Miquel S.A. Cigarette paper booklets first appeared in the 19th century and their international brand, Smoking, was introduced in 1924.

They manufacture Smoking, Pure Hemp, Guarani, Bugler, Bob Marley, SMK, Mantra and Bambú brand papers. They also produce many private label brands for other companies.

In 2006, Miquel y Costas was charged in Spain for allegedly using carcinogenic raw materials to cut production costs. The case was dismissed a few months later by the Audiencia Provincial de Barcelona, who found no basis for further proceedings.

== See also ==
- List of rolling papers
