= Bugler (disambiguation) =

A bugler is someone who plays the bugle.

Bugler may also refer to:

- Bugler (tobacco), a brand of tobacco
- Bugler (rank), a former military rank
- Bugler (BSA), a position in the Boy Scouts of America

== See also ==
- Brendan Bugler (born 1985), Irish hurler
- Donnabella Lacap-Bugler, Filipino microbiologist
