= Andrew McBain (microbiologist) =

- Born: 1971 (age 54–55)
- Education: University of Liverpool; Queens' College, Cambridge
- Awards: W H Pierce Prize (2005)
- Scientific career
- Workplaces: University of Manchester
- Thesis: Probiosis and prebiosis in relation to the ecology and physiology of the colonic microbiota (1997)
- Website: Prof Andrew Mcbain

Andrew James McBain (born 1971) is a Professor of Microbiology at the University of Manchester. His research is focused on the human microbiome, responses of biofilms to antimicrobial treatments, and the interaction of microorganisms colonising the skin, nasopharynx, oral cavity and intestine.

He graduated with a first-class degree in Microbiology from the University of Liverpool in 1993 and completed his PhD at Queens' College, Cambridge in 1997.

He was awarded the W H Pierce Prize of the Society for Applied Microbiology in 2005. He is the editor-in-chief of the Journal of Applied Microbiology.
