= Top (rolling papers) =

Brand of tobacco rolling papers

Package of Top papers

Top is a brand of cigarette rolling papers distributed by Republic Brands of Glenview, Illinois. Republic Brands (formerly Republic Tobacco) paid an undisclosed amount to acquire the brand from R. J. Reynolds in 1987.

Manufactured and imported into the United States from France, Top papers are available in regular and half size. Both size variations are sold in virtually identical light-yellow-colored packages with blue lettering, as well as a red and blue top which adorns its center. Top papers are most prevalent in the Midwestern United States, where they are popular within the marijuana-smoking culture.

The "2018-2025 Cigarette Rolling Paper Report on Global and United States Market, Status and Forecast, by Players, Types and Applications" research report lists "Rizla, Pay-Pay, Zig-Zag, OCB, TOP, Bambú, Bugler, EZ Wider, Export Aquafuge, JOB, Juicy Jay's, Laramie, Raw, Rollies, Swan, Tally-Ho" as the "vital supreme players in the worldwide 2018-2025 Cigarette Rolling Paper Report on and United States market".

== See also ==
- Roll-your-own
- List of rolling papers
