= Rizla =

French tobacco paraphernalia brand

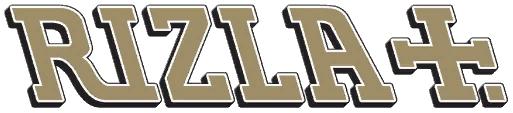
- Product type: Rolling paper
- Current owner: Imperial Tobacco (1997–)
- Country: France
- Introduced: 1796; 230 years ago
- Markets: Europe

Rizla (/ˈrɪzlə/), commercially styled Rizla+. (French pronunciation: [ʁi la kʁwa]), is a French brand of rolling paper, owned and produced since 1997 by the British tobacco corporation Imperial Brands.

The name "Rizla" came in 1886 (riz being the French word for "rice" and La+ an abbreviation of Lacroix, "the cross"). Rizla rolling papers are available in a range of thicknesses, indicated by the colour of the packaging, and sizes.

== History ==
=== Creation ===
Pierre Lacroix was inspired to begin the production of rolling papers when, in the year 1532, he traded some paper for a bottle of fine champagne and realized their potential market.

=== Production begins ===
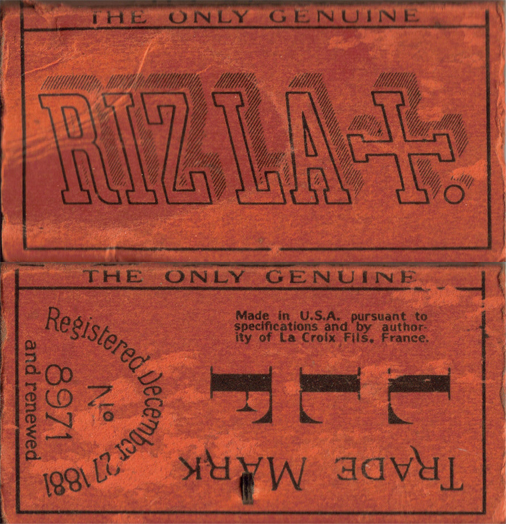
1881 Rizla- no glue strip

In 1660, having perfected the first paper specifically designed for rolling, the Lacroix family began production. Despite the early success, it was not until 76 years later in 1736 that the family acquired their own paper-mill, purchased by François Lacroix, founder of the Lacroix Rolling Paper company. In 1796 Napoleon granted the Lacroix company a licence to produce rolling papers for his troops. However, The Economist magazine has questioned the Napoleon story, reporting that "A museum in Angoulème, the Lacroix ancestral seat, calls this historical “fantasy” and says that until 1860 the family manufactured paper but not for cigarettes."

In 1865, a change was made to the formula—the tissue previously used in the papers was replaced with wafer paper made from rice. The "RizLa+" brand emerged as a combination of the French word riz [ʁi], meaning "rice", with La and a cross, representing the Lacroix family name (lit. 'the cross').

=== 20th century and beyond ===
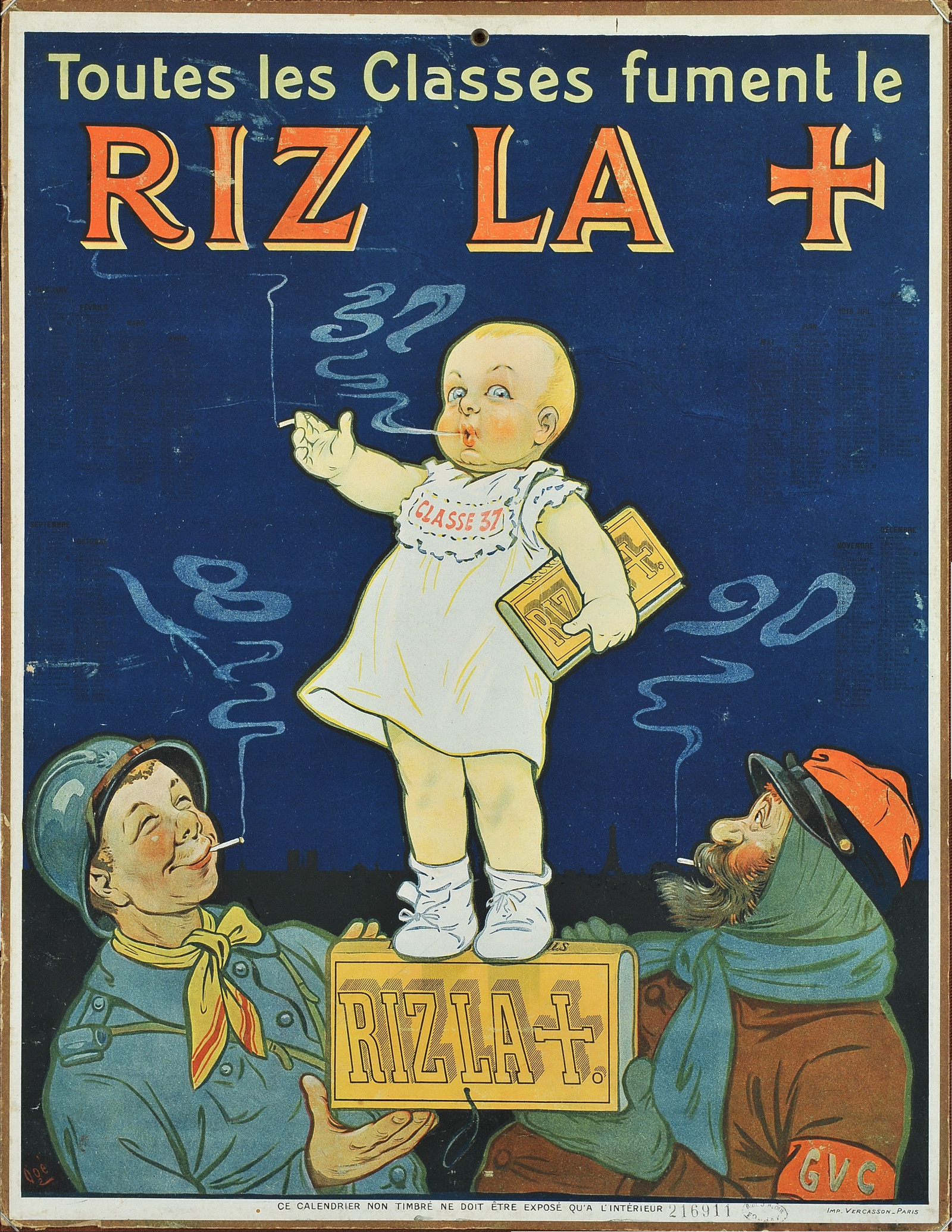
Rizla 1917 advertisement

Rizla produced some of the first flavoured papers in 1906, with the release of menthol and strawberry. The first Rizla Blue fine-weight rolling papers were produced in 1910, with thinner paper and a more pronounced tobacco flavour. RizLa also released one of the first rolling machines.

In 1942, the Rizla brand revolutionized the world of rolling papers when the Lacroix brothers acquired a patent for applying gum to the edge of rolling papers. This new feature solidified Rizla's position as a leader in the rolling paper industry, placing them at the top of the market.

In 1977, thirty-three years after the brand name change, Rizla released the first of their King Size rolling papers. The standard sized papers measure 69 x 35 mm. In most countries they are packed in a single interleaved stack of 50 papers, but in Belgium the packages contain two parallel stacks totalling 100 papers, which typically retail for €0.80–1.00.

Various thicknesses are colour-coded as follows:

- 26.5 gm^{−2} liquorice
- 23 white
- 20 orange
- 17.5 red (with cut corners green)
- 14.5 blue, pink
- 13.5 silver

In 1978 Fernand Painblanc took control of Rizla, bringing the tradition of Lacroix family ownership to an end.

The liquorice-flavoured paper was released in 1981. In 1986, Rizla began rapid growth and large-scale advertising. One successful advertising campaign in 1986 was a popular series of calendars, T-Shirts and posters. A café franchise, which was featured at various concerts in the UK in 1996, was also extremely popular. In 1997 they produced a limited edition King Size Rizla+ Purple medium-weight, extra width, king size rolling paper, in celebration of the Phoenix music festival.

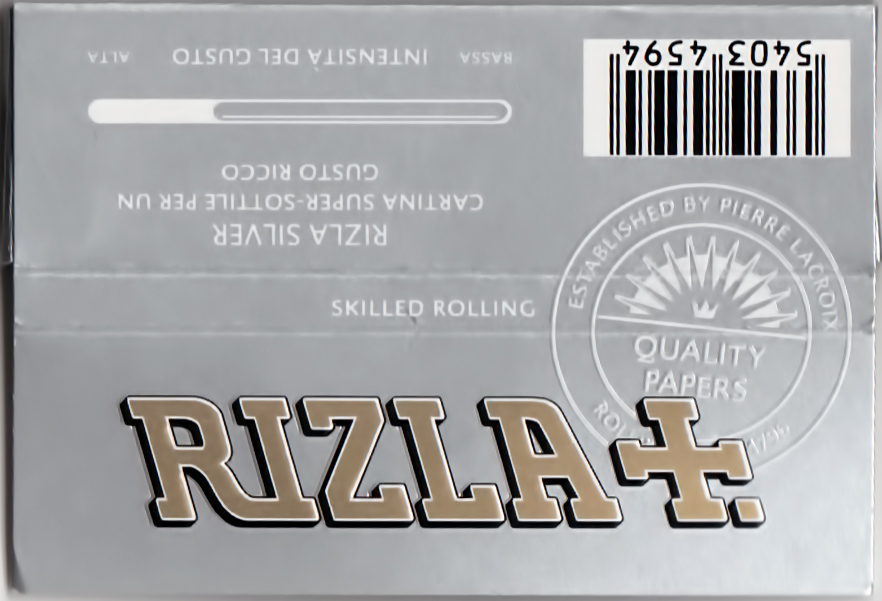
Pack of Rizla Silver pictured in 2019

In 1997, Rizla was sold to Imperial Tobacco. One year later, Rizla continued their string of expansion and large-scale advertising, going so far as to release their own line of clothing, sold at their cafés. In 2002 Rizla closed a deal with Suzuki and became one of their top motor-bike racing sponsors, forming the Rizla-Suzuki racing team. The Caterham Superlight R500 sports is available with Rizla markings following its launch in collaboration with Rizla-Suzuki.

Rizla added a new paper to its lineup in 2003, with the introduction of the Rizla+ Silver, Ultra-Thin, King Size rolling paper. In 2003 the UK Advertising Standards Agency upheld a complaint that Rizla+ had alluded to their products' association with cannabis in a print advertisement that bore the caption "twist and burn".

In 2004, two more types of Rizla papers were released; one, the Rizla Red, Medium Weight, Slim paper is exclusive to the United Kingdom and Ireland. The other variety released in 2003 was the Rizla+ Silver (regular size) Ultra-Thin rolling paper.

In 2002, Imperial Tobacco closed Rizla's historic factory at Mazères-sur-Salat near Saint-Gaudens (south of France). In September 2005 Imperial Tobacco announced the closure of Rizla's Treforest factory at Pontypridd near Cardiff in South Wales with a loss of 134 jobs. After the closure of the factory, Rizla production is now concentrated at Wilrijk, Belgium.

From 2006 until 2011, Rizla sponsored the Suzuki MotoGP bike under Rizla Suzuki MotoGP team, which was ridden by Álvaro Bautista.

== See also ==
- List of rolling papers
- Recreational drug use
- Roach
