= List of rolling papers =

Smoking mixture rolling papers

Rolling papers are small sheets, rolls, or leaves of paper which are sold for rolling cigarettes either by hand or with a rolling machine. When rolling a cigarette, one fills the rolling paper with tobacco, cannabis, cloves, damiana, hash or other herbs.

== Rolling papers ==
Notable rolling papers include the following:

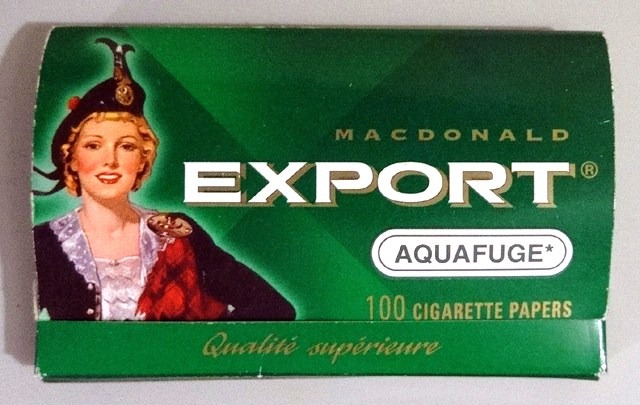
MacDonald Export Aquafuge cigarette papers

A box of Laramie cigarette tubes

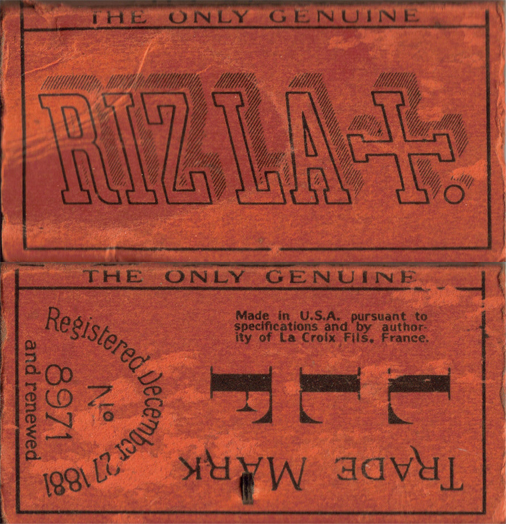
An early 20th century pack of Rizla rolling papers, (no glue strip)

A pack of king size Smoking Slim rolling papers

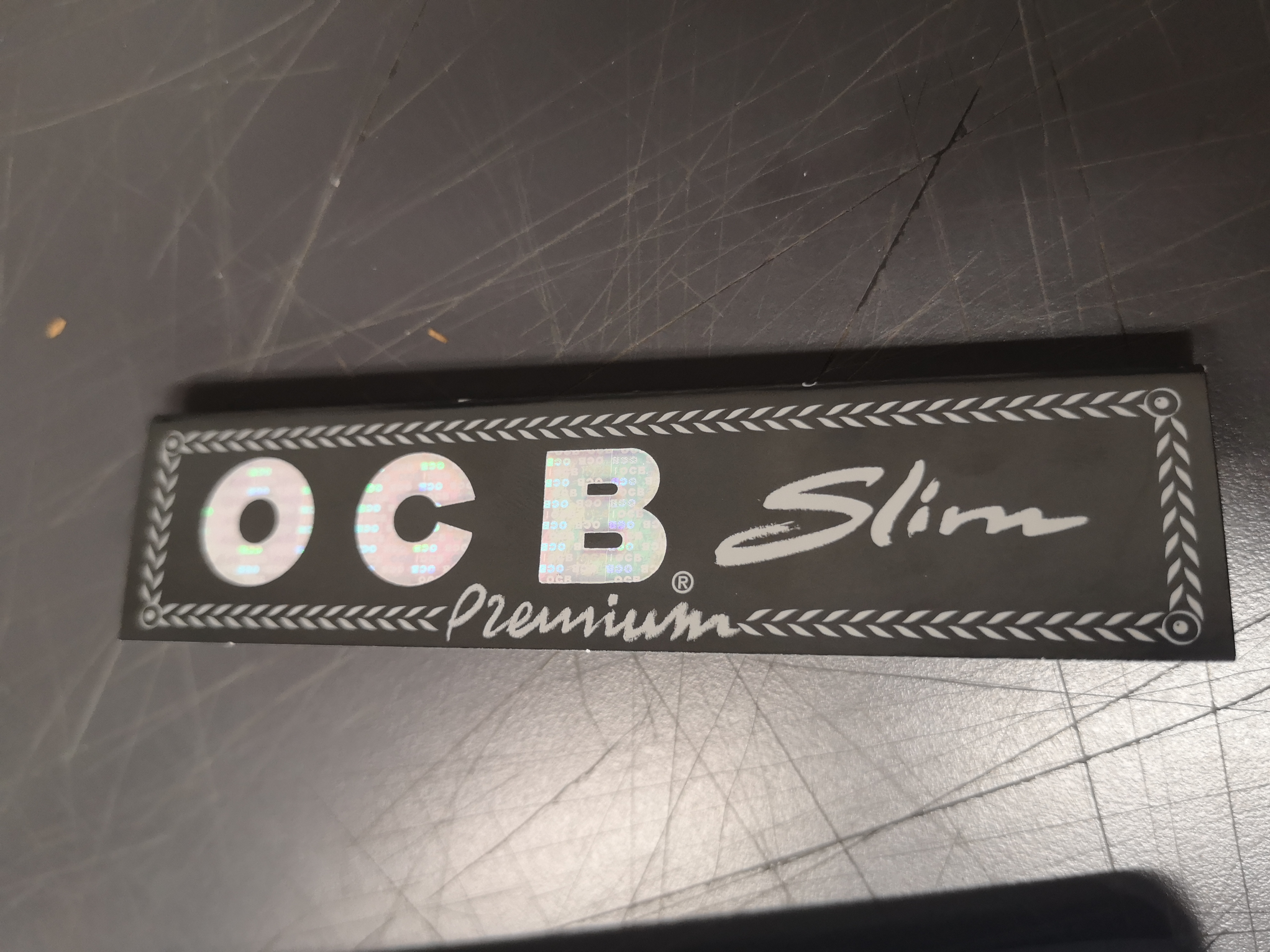
French rolling paper OCB

| Name | Country | Description |
|---|---|---|
| Bambu | Spain | Established in Spain, with production now in Argentina. |
| Bugler | France | In the United States, 115 leaves (folded) per book; competes with Rollit and Top. Was once popular in U.S. jails, when smoking was permitted. |
| E-Z Wider | | Began in 1972 to create a wider rolling paper. Now owned by Republic Tobacco (Republic Technologies Inc). |
| Juicy Jay's | United States | Flavored rolling papers sold in North America. Owned by BBK Tobacco & Foods, LLP (HBI International). |
| Kashmir | United States | Established in 2017 by Inter-Continental Trading USA, Inc. Produced in the USA. |
| Laramie | | A brand of cigarettes and cigarette rolling systems |
| Mascotte | The Netherlands | Dutch company manufacturing rolling papers in France, Germany, Austria and the United Kingdom. |
| OCB | France | Originally a Bolloré brand, sold to Republic Tobacco (Republic Technologies Inc); popular in Argentina, Germany and Sweden. |
| Pay-Pay | Spain | Pay-Pay rolling papers company was formed in Spain in 1703. This official website states the first papers were produced in 1764. It is the oldest rolling paper manufacturer still in operation. Pay-Pay is produced in Alcoy, Spain. The paper is made with ecological gum arabic. |
| RAW | United States | Owned by BBK Tobacco & Foods, LLP (HBI International). |
| Rizla | | Began in 1532. Originally French, they are now made in Belgium for Imperial Tobacco. |
| Smoking | | (Spain & Argentina) Manufactured by Miquel y Costas. |
| Snail Custom Rolling Papers | Slovenia | Established in 1995. Began as filter tips production and has shortly expanded and specialized in custom rolling papers; both for retail personalization and white-label, wholesale production. All papers are organic, chlorine-free and FSC-certified. Fully manufactured in Slovenia, Central Europe. |
| Tally-Ho | Australia | An Australian brand of rolling paper distributed by Imperial Tobacco Australia. |
| Top | France | In the United States, 100 leaves (not folded) per book; Owned by Republic Tobacco (The Republic Group). |
| Zig-Zag | France | In the United States, 100 leaves (not folded) per book; Owned by Republic Tobacco (The Republic Group). |

== Gallery ==
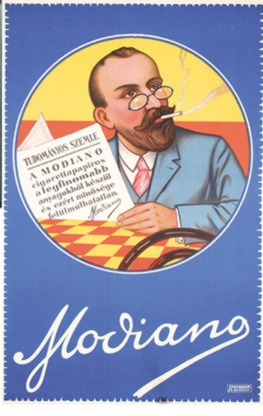
Club rolling papers

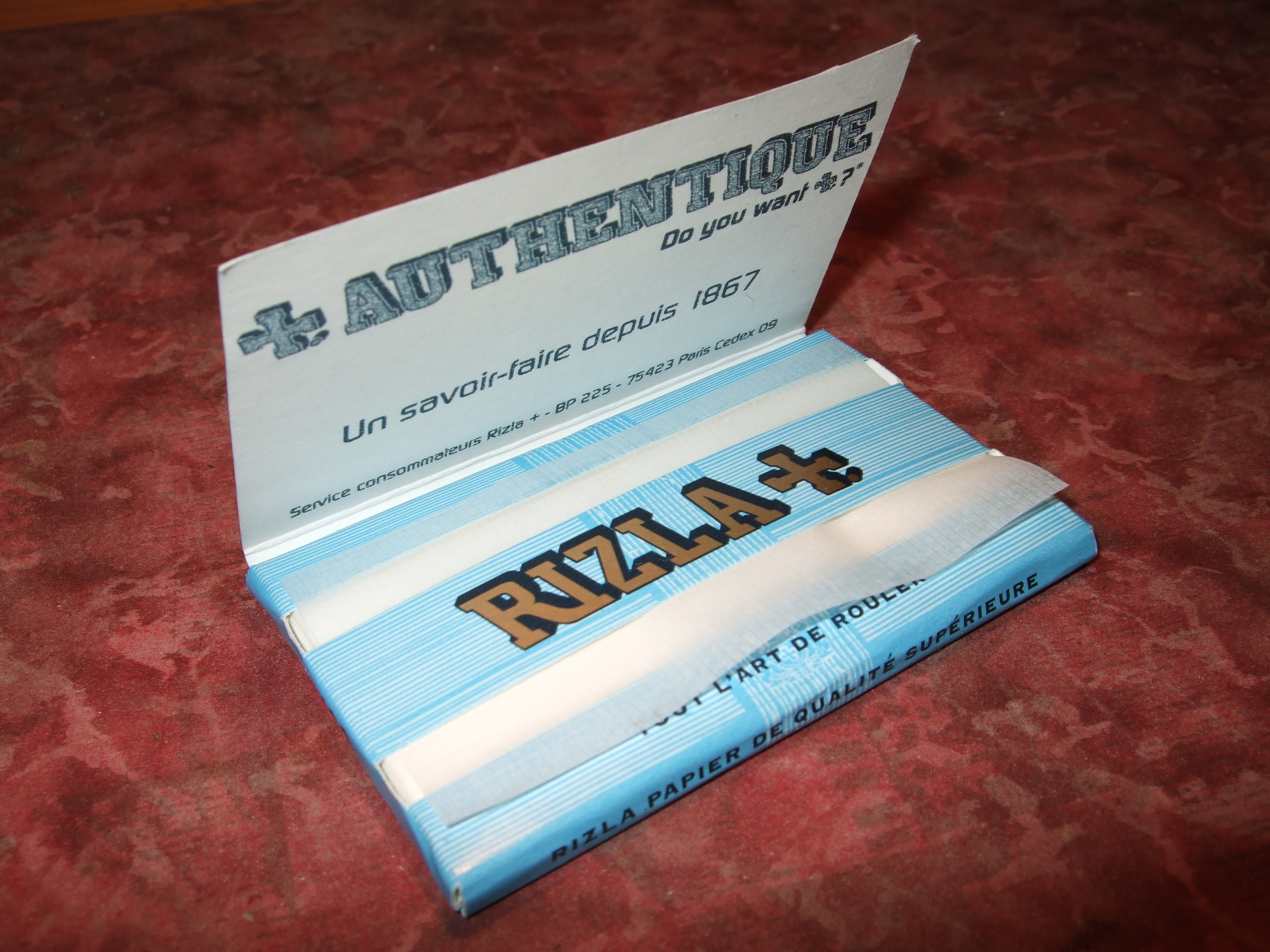
Rizla rolling papers

== See also ==
- Smoking
- Tobacco industry
