= Shag (tobacco) =

Fine-cut tobacco

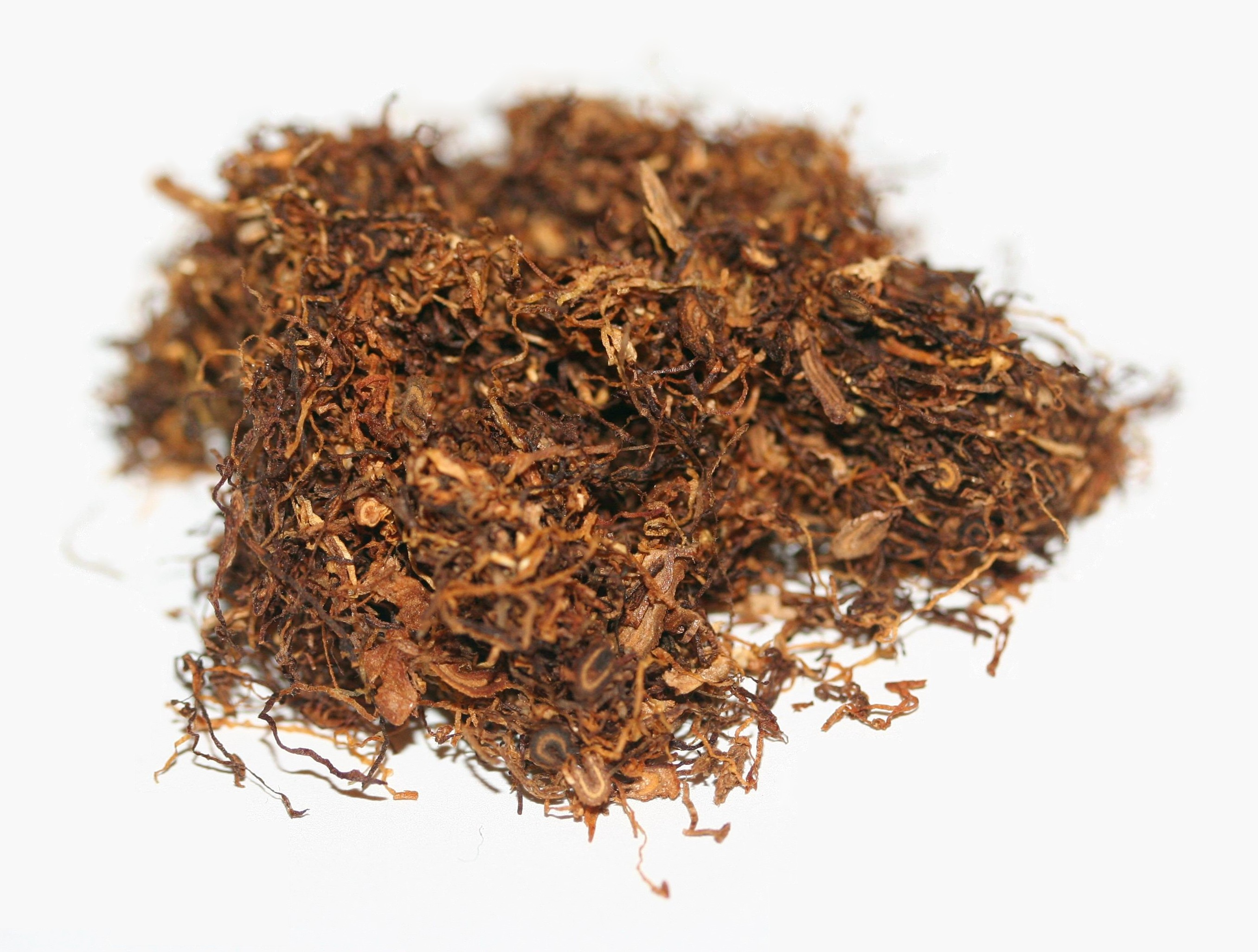
Shag tobacco

Shag, also known as rolling tobacco, loose tobacco, or informally (in Commonwealth English) as baccy, is thinly cut tobacco, used to make self-made cigarettes by hand rolling the tobacco into rolling paper or injecting it into filter tubes. It got its name from the finely cut strands appearing like 'shag' fabric and was originally considered poor quality. Various types of cut are used; most shag blends use a simple mixture of cutting styles, consisting mostly of loose cut but also krumble kake, ribbon cut and flake may be used. Some shag blends use cuts reminiscent of pipe tobacco.

A cigarette made with shag tobacco may be called a rollie, a roll-up/dole-up or hand-rolled. The flat bags in which shag is typically packaged for commercial sale are often called tobacco pouches. Oppositely, pre-processed and packaged cigarettes may be referred to colloquially as tailor-mades, tailies, tailors or straights.

Smoking shag is cheaper than smoking ready-made cigarettes. The price of a standard pouch tobacco (originally 50 grams, now often 42.5 grams) is about the same as a packet of cigarettes. As the average self-rolled cigarette will contain less than one gram of tobacco often 50 or more cigarettes are rolled from a pouch for nearly the same price as 19 or 20 ready-made cigarettes, though not accounting for the cost of rolling paper and filters.

== Shag styles ==
There are several shag blends or tobacco styles using different tobaccos, curing techniques and cutting types. Sometimes additives like sugar, glycerol and fruit flavors are added.

- American shag is typically a mixture of domestic and/or imported tobacco and air cured Burley.
- Virginia or Light blends are mainly made up of Virginia tobacco.
- Smooth adds Georgia tobaccos to a Light blend.
- Halfzware, meaning "half heavy" in Dutch, is a combination of Light and Zware shag, nowadays called Stevige or Volle.
- Turkish is a blend that mainly consists of Turkish tobaccos like Yenidje, Samsun, Bafra etc.
- Zware, meaning "heavy" in Dutch, consists mainly of fire cured Kentucky, Latakia and air cured Paraguay.

== Europe ==
In a 2014 study, the median weight of one roll-your-own cigarette was 0.75 g, based on 192 smokers who exclusively consumed roll-your-own cigarettes. Studies have attributed part of the price advantage of roll-your-own tobacco to lower taxation compared with factory-made cigarettes. A 2015 study of roll-your-own tobacco use in Europe concluded that effective tobacco tax regulation was needed to reduce or eliminate this price advantage. On 19 May 2014, the Tobacco Products Directive (2014/40/EU) entered into force and prohibited cigarettes and rolling tobacco with characterizing flavors and EU countries must be provided a list of ingredients used in tobacco product by the tobacco industry.

== Netherlands ==
Shag tobacco has always had a high market-share in the Dutch tobacco-market, although it is declining. In 1989 some 53% of the combined shag and cigarette market was for shag-tobacco while in 2010 it was about 42%.

Besides the hand rolled cigarette using brands like Drum, Samson or Van Nelle, many people also smoke homemade cigarettes: with the help of a special tool they fill empty tubes with tobacco. The longer pieces of tobacco used for shag are not ideal for this use. For these smokers many (smaller) tobacco companies sell tobacco that resembles the type that is used for cigarettes: it is cut in much smaller pieces and is also "drier" than the normal shag. This "home cigarette" tobacco comes in packs or drums of 200 gram. Although the same tobacco-firms produce both shag as well as this "cigarette" tobacco it isn't sold under the name of their major brand-names.

== England ==
In 2018, a study conducted in England showed that smokers using rolling tobacco were less likely than smokers of manufactured cigarettes to cite cost as a motive for attempting to quit smoking.

In May 2020, the use of menthol as a characterizing flavor in cigarettes was prohibited, but not menthol flavored filters for hand rolled cigarettes. In 2020, 49.6% of smokers who rolled-their-own cigarettes smoked menthol, which in 2022 increased to 61.9%.

By October 2023, 54.4% of adult cigarette smokers in England mainly or exclusively smoked hand-rolled cigarettes. Among women aged 18–45 who smoked, the figure was 61.4%.

In 2024, the duty on all tobacco products in the UK was increased by the tobacco duty escalator of 2% above RPI inflation.

== Ireland ==
The 2024 Illegal Tobacco Product Survey showed that 36% of the pouches of tobacco surveyed were classified as illegal, which increased in 2025 by 1%. In December 2025, new regulations were introduced to control tobacco products and reduce the Excise Duty abuse and illegal tobacco trades.

== Australia ==
The Australian Government implemented bans and changes to tobacco products in 2025 which included roll-your-own pouches to be reduced to only 30 grams of tobacco.

== France ==
In 2024 there was a decrease in the amount of smokers using roll-your-own tobacco by 13.2%.

== Production ==
The three main producers of shag-tobacco are Van Nelle, Drum and Niemeyer - where Van Nelle and Drum are both part of Imperial Tobacco since Sara Lee sold their tobacco interests, while Niemeyer is a subsidiary of British American Tobacco. Six of the top 10 brands of shag tobacco are brands of these two companies, while three of the remaining brands are "economy" brands sold in some of the large discount supermarkets.

== Cultural references ==
The fictional detective Sherlock Holmes frequently smokes large amounts of shag tobacco in pipe form while pondering the details of a case, leaving the air thick with smoke.

In his song, 'Under Me Sensi' (released in the UK in 1984), Barrington Levy disabuses a police officer that he is not smoking marijuana by explaining that he only smokes cigarettes and "shag".

Irish singer-songwriter Gavin Friday's 1995 album was titled Shag Tobacco.

In the British sitcom Only Fools and Horses the character Uncle Albert claims to smoke his own recipe of "Navy shag and Dutch tobacco".

== See also ==
- Roll-your-own cigarette
- Rolling paper
