= Drum (tobacco) =

Dutch brand of hand-rolling tobacco

- Product type: Shag tobacco
- Current owner: Imperial Tobacco (1998–)
- Country: Netherlands
- Introduced: 1952; 74 years ago
- Markets: US, Europe
- Previous owners: Sara Lee Corp.

Drum is a Dutch brand of fine-cut handrolling tobacco, or shag, introduced in 1952. It was originally produced and distributed by the Douwe Egberts corporation. Douwe Egberts was purchased by the Sara Lee Corporation, which sold Drum to Imperial Brands, the current British producer.

== Outside the US ==
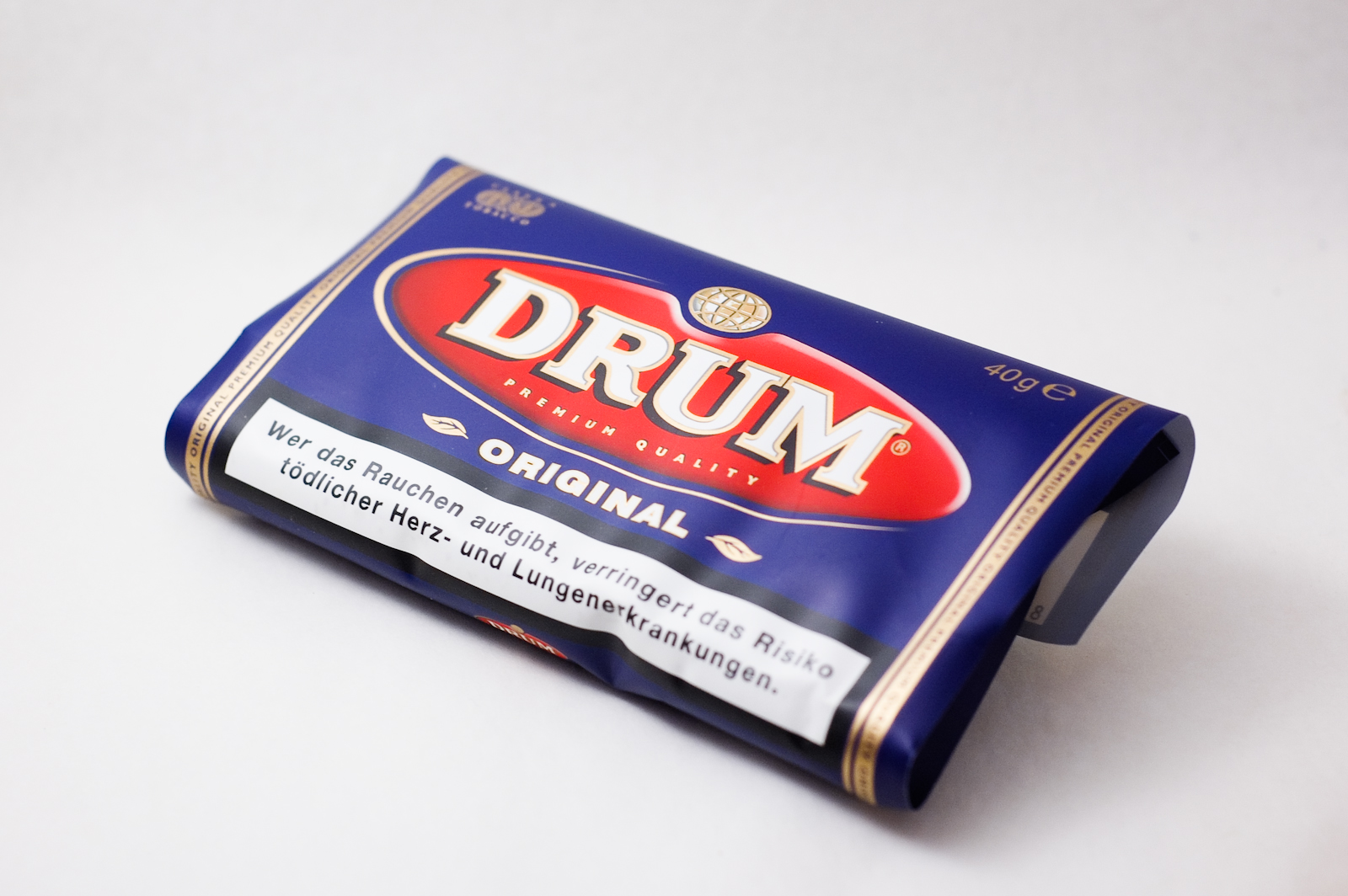
A packet of Drum shag 40 gram pouch.(Halfzware Shag)

Drum is worldwide the #1 brand for shag tobacco. Before Sara Lee sold their Drum and Van Nelle tobacco section to Imperial the main factories for Drum were Drachten and Joure. The factory in Drachten was closed directly after the move to Imperial in 1989 and IT decided to further integrate the production within Douwe Egberts / Van Nelle (DEVN) which also had production facilities in the nearby Joure (30 km) and Meppel (60 km). IT invested 22 million guilders (€10 million) in new machinery for the remaining locations. Drum Tobacco is also produced outside the Netherlands in several factories of the Imperial Tobacco group.

== United Kingdom ==
Before Douwe Egberts introduced Drum in the UK there was an active grey market and Drum had a large market-share: as the tobacco prices were once much higher in the UK than on the European mainland, there were many people who travelled to (mainly) Belgium or France by ferry to import alcohol and tobacco. Although this is still going on, the price differences from 10 years ago have decreased.

However, rolling tobacco still, as of October 2023, remains around a third of the price in Belgium as it is in the UK, and smuggling continues. When Douwe Egberts was ready to introduce Drum they faced some legal problems, forcing them to change the brand name to Duma, and was struggling to get a foothold on the UK duty-paid market.

== Netherlands ==
In the Netherlands, Drum is the #2 selling brand of shag-tobacco, just below Van Nelle, which is also a brand of Imperial Tobacco. Smoking shag tobacco used to be more popular in the Netherlands than smoking ready-made cigarettes. In 1989, the 'market share' of shag-tobacco was 53%, but decreased to 42% in 2010.

The main reason for the popularity is the price. A typical cigarette contains less than 1 gram of tobacco. A pouch of 40-42.5 grams is about the same price as a box of 19-20 cigarettes, so the cost of a self-rolled cigarette is half the price of a ready-made cigarette. Many people also put much less tobacco in a self-rolled cigarette. The taxes on tobacco are mainly based on the weight of tobacco, so the margins for the producer are lower on shag than on ready-made cigarettes.

== European Blends ==
As the original terms "half-zwaar" (medium strong) and "mild" cannot be used anymore due to European rules the different blends are now referenced by their colour. Not all blends are available in each country.

Tobacco	Select	Original	Bright Blue	Gold
Dark Kentucky	******	*****-	**----	*-----
Bright Virginia	******	*****-	*****-	****--
Burley & Oriental	------	------	***---	****--
