= Journal of Applied Microbiology =

- Discipline: Microbiology
- Language: English
- Edited by: Andrew McBain

Publication details
- Former name(s): Proceedings of the Society of Agricultural Bacteriologists, Journal of Applied Bacteriology
- History: 1939-present
- Publisher: Oxford University Press on behalf of the Society for Applied Microbiology
- Frequency: Monthly
- Impact factor: 3.2 (2024)

Standard abbreviations
- ISO 4: J. Appl. Microbiol.

Indexing
- CODEN: JAMIFK
- ISSN: 0021-8847 (print); 1365-2672 (web)
- LCCN: 97660036
- OCLC no.: 15636522

Links
- Journal homepage; Online access; Online archive

The Journal of Applied Microbiology is a monthly peer-reviewed scientific journal covering applied microbiology. It was established in 1939 as the Proceedings of the Society of Agricultural Bacteriologists, and published under the name Journal of Applied Bacteriology from 1954 to 1996, obtaining its current name in 1997. It is published by Wiley-Blackwell on behalf of the Society for Applied Microbiology. The editor-in-chief is Andrew McBain. According to the Journal Citation Reports, the journal has a 2022 impact factor of 3.2.
