= Bob Stiller =

American billionaire

Robert P. Stiller is an American billionaire who co-founded E-Z Wider in 1972 and Keurig Green Mountain coffee company in 1981. He graduated from New York Military Academy and Parsons College. In 2001, he was named Forbes's first "Entrepreneur of the Year" and one of Investors Business Daily's "Top 10 leaders and successful CEOs".
