= New York Military Academy =

Location
- 78 Academy Ave; Cornwall-on-Hudson, New York 12520; United States; 41.4483°N 74.0275°W

Information
- Type: Private; college preparatory; boarding; day; military academy
- Motto: Toujours Prêt (Always Ready)
- Religious affiliation: Nonsectarian
- Established: 1889
- Founder: Charles Jefferson Wright
- Superintendent: Sunny Doman
- CEEB code: 331-515
- Grades: 9–12
- Gender: Coeducational
- Campus size: 121 acres (49 ha); 51 buildings
- Campus type: Rural
- Colors: Maroon & white
- Athletics: 14 interscholastic sports
- Athletics conference: NEPSAC – HVAL; NYSAISAA
- Mascot: Knight
- Nickname: Knights
- Team name: New York Military Academy Knights
- Accreditation: MSA
- School fees: Uniform fee (first year only): $2,000; Books & Technology: $700; Cadet activities & Athletic gear: $1,000; Grooming & Personal Maintenance: $250; ESL fee: $4,000; Health insurance: $1,500; Commencement fee: $400
- Tuition: $54,000 (local, boarding) $29,000 (day) $65,640 (international)
- Affiliations: NAIS (NYSAIS)
- Website: nyma.org

New York Military Academy (NYMA) is a private, college preparatory, boarding school in Cornwall, New York, United States. NYMA is one of the oldest military schools in the United States.

== History ==
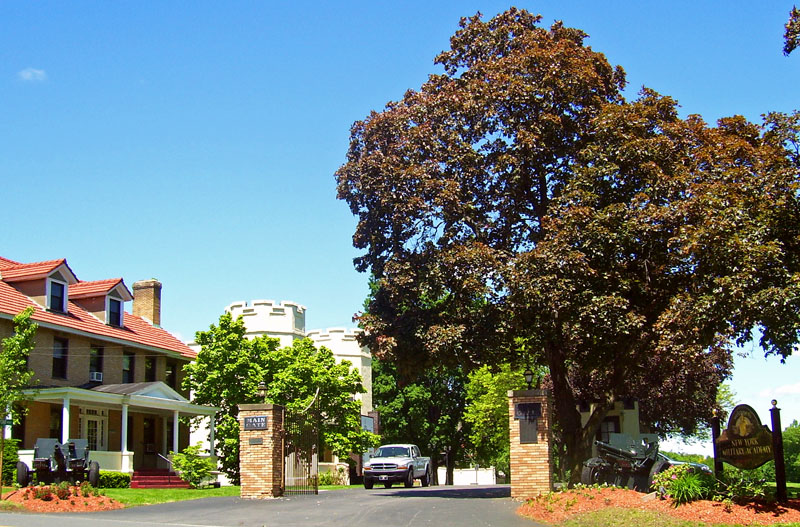
NYMA Main Gate (2006 photo)

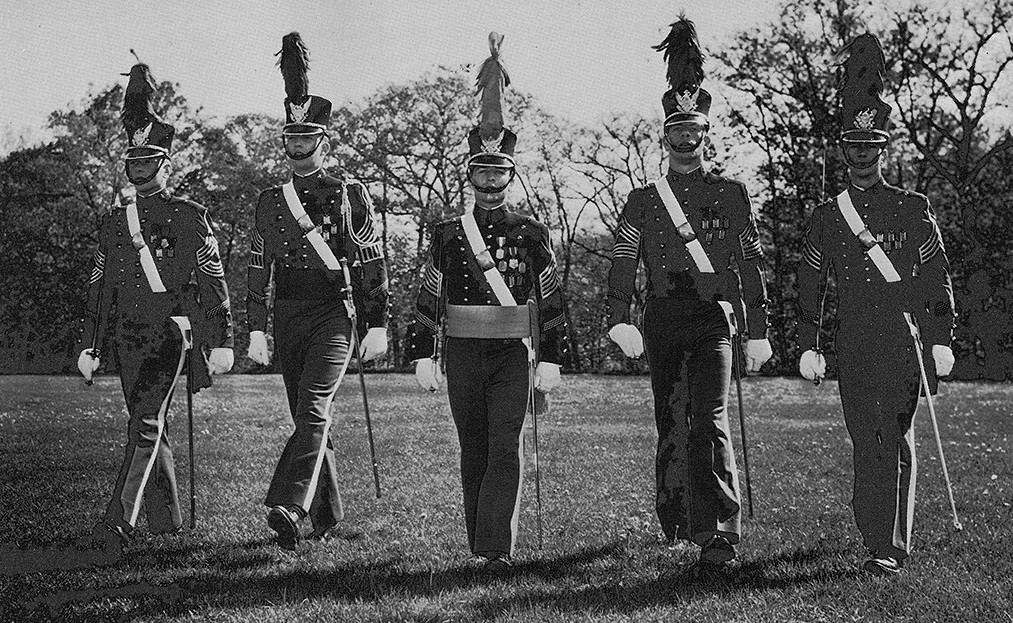
NYMA students in uniform, 1964, including Donald Trump, second from left

New York Military Academy was founded in 1889 by American Civil War veteran and former schoolteacher from New Hampshire Charles Jefferson Wright, a former Commandant of Cadets of the nearby Peekskill Military Academy. Wright's successor, Sebastian Jones, presided over the academy from 1894 to 1922, guiding it during its most critical period of growth from a young and small institution of 48 cadets, through a disastrous fire in 1910, and throughout an extensive reconstruction program.

In some of its early years, the campus also hosted a non-military "NYMA Lower School" for grades one through six. The academy previously admitted students as early as the fifth grade. Gradually throughout the mid-to-late 1990s, grades five and six were no longer accepted. By the 1999-2000 school-year, the academy accepted students from only the seventh grade on. Today, the school is Grade 9-12.

Over time, the campus expanded from 30 acres (12 ha) to a peak of 550 acres (220 ha), and enrollment peaked at 525 students during the 1960s. Girls have been admitted since 1975.

The campus also has been host to popular camps like Camp All-America into the 1980s and the NYMA Leadership Program.

=== 2010-2015 financial difficulties and sale ===
Due to financial problems and enrollment that had dwindled to 145 students, the school was scheduled to close in June 2010. However, a group of alumni and local business people created a plan to save the school, raising almost $6 million of financing in a matter of weeks, and expecting to sell off some less-utilized portions of the campus.

On March 3, 2015, NYMA filed for Chapter 11 bankruptcy protection, and the academy failed to open in September 2015 for the school year. Instead, it headed to bankruptcy auction, where on September 30 it was auctioned for $15.825 million to the Chinese-owned Research Center on Natural Conservation Inc., a non-profit corporation led by billionaire Vincent Tianquan Mo, Chairman and CEO of SouFun Holdings and a member of the Chinese People’s Political Consultative Conference.

=== Re-opening ===
After spending millions of dollars refurbishing the campus, supporting instruction and making capital improvements, the school reopened on November 2, 2015, with "a handful of returning students" and a recruitment drive. For 2016–17, the academic year began with a total of 29 students.

Years later, the sale attracted attention from federal officials: in January 2023, Florida representative Michael Waltz wrote a letter to Defense Secretary Lloyd Austin in which he expressed concern over the implications that "CCP-influenced schools" had for America's national security and in February and July, Congress introduced bills in the House and Senate that proposed barring private schools with ties to the Chinese government from starting or continuing Junior Reserve Officers’ Training Corps programs.

== Location ==
The school is located in the town of Cornwall, New York, and uses the mailing address of Cornwall-on-Hudson.

== Student life ==
The days at NYMA typically begin at 6:00 a.m. and end at 10:00 p.m. Cadets attend classes and participate in interscholastic or intramural sports, activities, and study hall. During closed weekends, cadets are expected to attend additional leadership training, drill & ceremony, and maintain the appearance of their respective barracks. Upon gaining the opportunity for an open weekend, cadets in good academic standing can apply for weekend furlough. Cadets are expected to follow the school's honor code that a cadet will not lie, cheat, steal, or tolerate those who do.

=== Organization ===
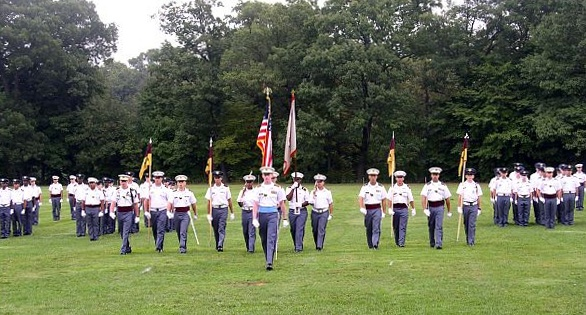
Cadets on parade (2004 photo)

The structure of the Corps of Cadets is adjusted depending on the number of students enrolled at the academy. As a military school, the Junior Reserve Officers' Training Corps (JROTC) was previously a key component, but is no longer active. Participation in the school's military program is required to graduate. The battalion has typically consisted of:

- Command Staff
- Band Company (not currently active)
- Line Companies: Alpha, Bravo, Charlie, Foxtrot and Golf
- Delta troop or "D-troop": a cavalry unit drawn from the equestrian program (not currently active)

=== Athletics ===
NYMA has competed in football, basketball, baseball, soccer, bowling, lacrosse, rugby, swimming, softball, track & field, volleyball, cross-country, wrestling, tennis, tifle team, golf, drill team, and raiders. The school's mascot is the Knight. Teams have competed in the Hudson Valley Athletic League, a member league of the New England Preparatory School Athletic Conference (NEPSAC).

=== Hazing ===
In earlier decades, NYMA's official regulations permitted a certain level of hazing and physical discipline by supervisors and older cadets, although the academy's senior administrators were forced to resign after a particularly severe incident in 1964.

While hazing later became forbidden by the school's rules and policies, a lawsuit was settled in which it had been claimed that physical and emotional abuse in the form of hazing had taken place in 2005. NYMA cited adverse publicity from the 2005 incident as one of the reasons the school nearly closed in 2010.

== Notable alumni ==
- Robert (Tex) Allen, Class of 1924, actor
- Robert Todd Lincoln Beckwith, Class of 1923 (did not graduate), great-grandson of Abraham Lincoln
- Bob Benmosche, Class of 1962, president and CEO of insurance companies MetLife and AIG
- James E. Briggs, Class of 1924, general in U.S. Air Force
- Les Brown, Class of 1932, bandleader
- Daniel Cassidy (1943–2008), author
- Francis Ford Coppola, Class of 1956 (did not graduate), Oscar-winning film director
- Richard J. Daronco (1931–1988), federal judge
- Art Davie, Class of 1964, founder of Ultimate Fighting Championship
- Fairleigh Dickinson Jr., Class of 1937, businessman and politician
- Troy Donahue, Class of 1954, actor
- William C. Eddy (1902–1989), pioneer of electronic technologies
- Homer Gilbert (1909–1943), a.k.a. "Knuckles Boyle", professional football player
- John A. "Junior" Gotti, organized crime figure
- Johnny Green (1908–1989), composer and Oscar-winning music arranger
- Lew Hayman (1908–1984), Canadian football coach
- Robert Douglas Heaton (1873–1933), politician
- Matt Joyce, Class of 1989, professional football player
- Alexander Julien, Class of 2006 (did not graduate), musician, member of Vision Eternel
- Harold F. Linder, Class of 1917, banker and ambassador
- Tarky Lombardi Jr., Class of 1947, politician
- Jack Luden (1902–1951), silent film actor
- Johnny Mandel, Class of 1944, Grammy- and Oscar-winning composer and arranger
- Robert B. McClure, Class of 1915, general in U.S. Army
- Joel Rivera (born 1978), politician
- Alfred Sieminski (1911–1990, did not graduate), politician
- Donald B. Smith, Class of 1965, general in U.S. Army
- Stephen Sondheim, attended 1940–1942, Tony-, Grammy-, Oscar- and Pulitzer-winning composer and lyricist
- Bob Stiller, Class of 1961, founder of Green Mountain Coffee
- Albert Tate Jr., Class of 1937, judge
- Donald Trump, Class of 1964, 45th and 47th President of the United States
- Spencer Tunick, Class of 1985, photographer

== Major buildings ==
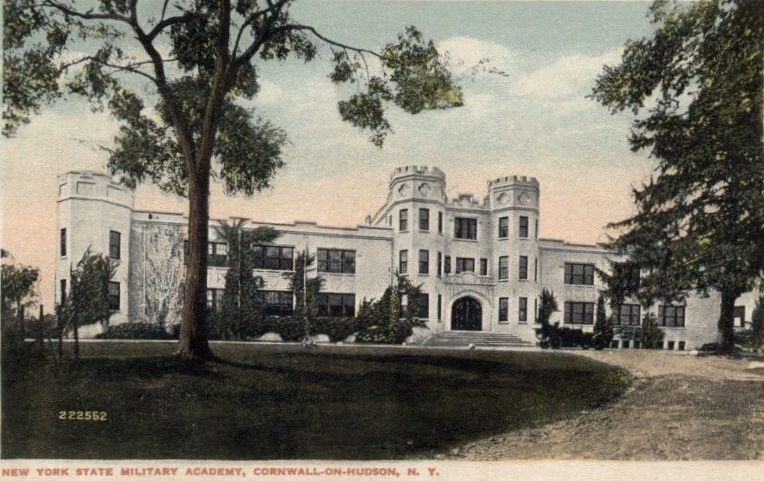
NYMA Academic Building (c. 1916 postcard)

- Academic Building
- Davis Chapel (contains the second-largest theater pipe organ in New York, custom-built by M.P. Moller in 1927)
- Jones Barracks (partially closed)
- Booth Library (partially closed)
- Scarborough Hall
- Pattillo Hall
- Riley (formerly Dingley) Hall
- Dickinson Hall (closed, not currently occupied)
- Alumni Gym and Pool

== See also ==
- West Point
