= Donald B. Smith =

Sheriff and United States Army general (born 1947)

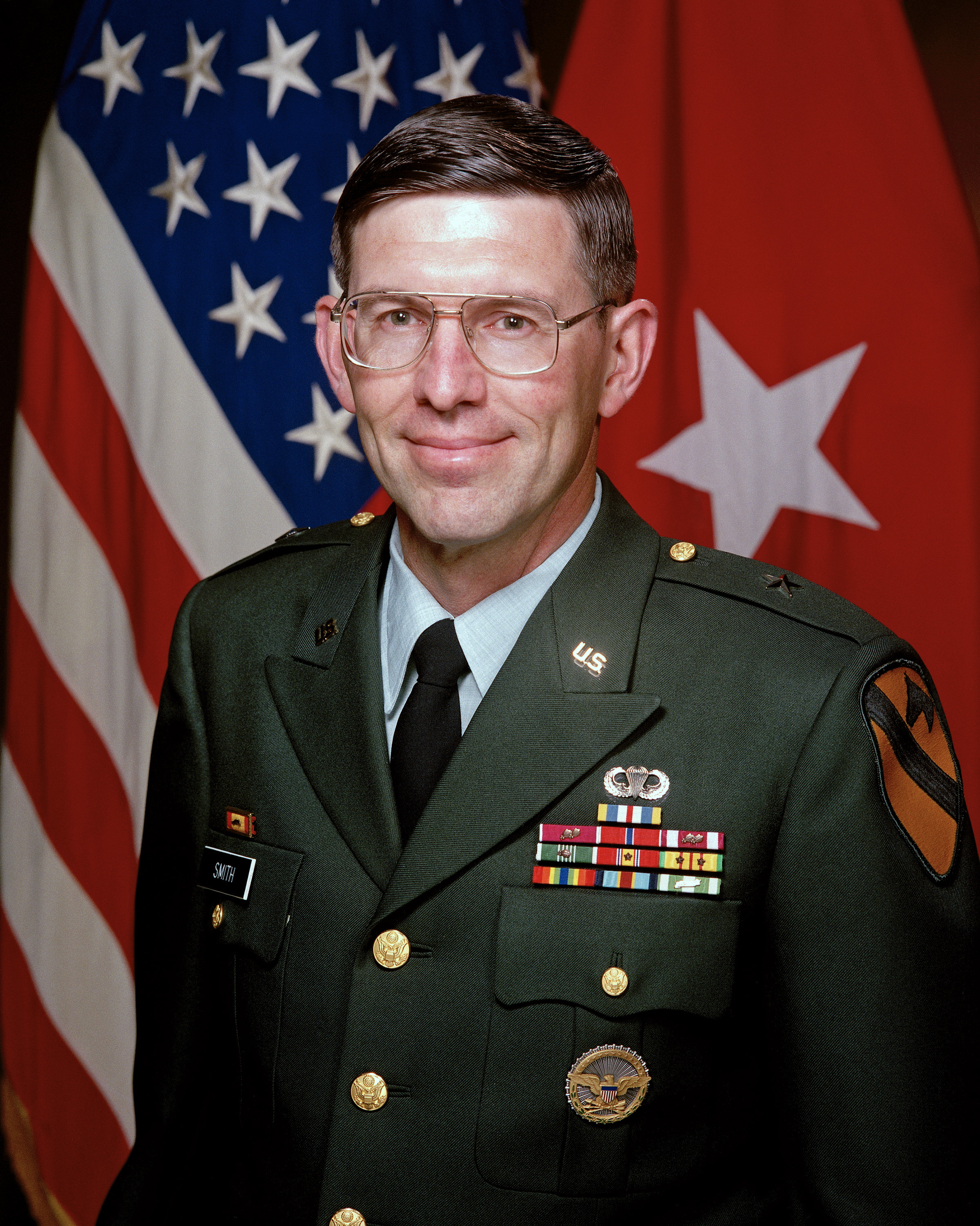
- Brigadier General Smith in January 1994
- Born: September 18, 1947 (age 78); Danbury, Connecticut, US
- Education: BS, US Military Academy; MS, Uni. of Southern CA
- Occupations: Soldier; sheriff
- Political party: Republican
- Spouse: Jane Powell (m. 1972; died 2015)
- Children: Two; nine grandchildren
- Military career
- Branch: United States Army
- Years: 1969–
- Rank: Brigadier general
- Conflicts: Vietnam War
- Awards: Defense Superior Service; Legion of Merit × 2

54th Sheriff of Putnam County, NY
- In office January 1, 2002 – December 29, 2017
- Preceded by: Robert D. Thoubboron
- Succeeded by: Robert L. Langley Jr.

Donald Blaine Smith (born September 18, 1947) is an American former sheriff of Putnam County, New York, and a retired United States Army officer.

== Personal life ==
Donald Blaine Smith, born on September 18, 1947 in Danbury, Connecticut, grew up in the Putnam County town of Patterson, New York. Smith married Jane Powell (born 1951) on June 24, 1972, at the Holy Trinity Church in Pawling, New York; she died of breast cancer on December 6, 2015. Smith has two children (Christopher and Cherilynne) and, as of December 2017, nine grandchildren. That same year, records showed that Smith owned multiple properties in New York, Florida, and Virginia with a summative value of US$1.149 million (equivalent to about $1.509M in 2025).

== Education ==
Smith graduated from the New York Military Academy in 1965, and the United States Military Academy in 1969. After receiving his Bachelor of Science from the latter, Smith was commissioned as a second lieutenant in the United States Army. Smith later earned his Master of Science in systems management from the University of Southern California.

== Military career ==
While in the Army, Smith attended and graduated from the United States Army Command and General Staff College and the National Defense University (1986). From 1993–1996, Smith served as the chief of the United States delegation to the International Military Sports Council.

Awards received during his military service include the Distinguished Service Medal, the Defense Superior Service Medal, two Legion of Merits, the Bronze Star Medal, three Meritorious Service Medals, and two Army Commendation Medals. Smith's promotion from colonel to brigadier general was scheduled to go before the United States Senate on March 3, 1992; he later retired from the Army at that higher rank.

== Sheriff's career ==
Robert D. Thoubboron was elected as the Putnam County, New York sheriff in 1985, but by 2001, he and his office were embroiled in controversies including abuse of civil and political rights, drunken law enforcement officers, and retaliatory abuse of power. Smith, then the deputy county executive for Putnam County (since 1999), had no law-enforcement experience. Despite this, he secured the endorsement of the Democratic, Conservative, Independence, and Green parties before defeating Thoubboron in the 2001 Putnam County Republican Party primary election. With the single-purpose platform of "bring[ing] integrity back to the Sheriff's Department leadership," Smith received 62% of votes to Thoubboron's 38%. Instead of conceding however, Thoubboron ran against Smith again in the general election under the banner of "Safe County", a political party created solely for the incumbent sheriff; on November 11, 2001, Smith defeated Thoubboron again, this time with 76% of the vote.

Elected as the 54th sheriff of Putnam County, Smith took office on January 1, 2002. According to the Putnam County Sheriff's Department biography of Smith, during the sheriff's tenure he has focused his efforts on community policing, "increasing the intensity of the war on drugs," and promoting "drivers’ safety programs and safety belt usage". Smith's biography also said that his leadership is responsible for the expansion of school resource officers in Putnam County middle and high schools.

Smith has been a three-time officeholder with the New York State Sheriffs' Association (NYSSA), serving as their president, chairman of their legislative committee, and as a trustee on their executive board. In 2013, while representing the NYSSA, Smith evoked the United States Declaration of Independence and the Second Amendment to the United States Constitution when he spoke out against the NY SAFE Act. The NYSSA and Smith personally joined the New York State Rifle and Pistol Association's lawsuit alleging the legislation violated the constitutions of the United States and of New York. After the 2016 death of Supreme Court Associate Justice Antonin Scalia, the lawsuit was dropped out of fear that the court could rule against them, setting precedent.

By 2017, Smith's county salary was $142,818 (equivalent to $187,587 in 2025). Running that year for his fifth term as sheriff, Smith lost to Robert L. Langley Jr. by 341 votes. After 16 years as sheriff, Smith stepped down as Langley was sworn-in on December 29, 2017.

=== Electoral history ===
2001 primary, Sheriff, Putnam County, New York
Party	Candidate	Votes	%
Republican	Donald B. Smith	3,536	61.75
Republican	Robert D. Thoubboron	2,189	38.23

2001 general, Sheriff, Putnam County, New York
Party	Candidate	Votes	%
Republican	Donald B. Smith	15,741	75.63
Safe County	Robert D. Thoubboron	5,068	24.35

2005 general, Sheriff, Putnam County, New York
Party	Candidate	Votes	%
Republican	Donald B. Smith	13,254	99.98

2009 general, Sheriff, Putnam County, New York
Party	Candidate	Votes	%
Republican	Donald B. Smith	11,563	59.72
Democratic	Kevin J. McConville	6,440	33.26
Working Families	Jim Borkowski	1,351	6.98

2013 general, Sheriff, Putnam County, New York
Party	Candidate	Votes	%
Republican	Donald B. Smith	11,524	98.76

2017 general, Sheriff, Putnam County, New York
Party	Candidate	Votes	%
Democratic	Robert L. Langley	12,330	49.67
Republican	Donald B. Smith	12,006	48.37

=== Adam Levy controversy ===
Adam Levy served as the Putnam County, New York district attorney (DA) from 2007–2015, and his relationship with Smith quickly befouled when each began arguing with the other over "perceived intrusions into each man's respective county agency." By January 2013, Smith had begun writing to New York and United States federal law enforcement agencies about Levy's alleged interference.

Alexandru Hossu was a Romanian in the United States on a years-expired travel visa. A friend and personal trainer to Levy, Hossu was arrested by the Putnam County Sheriff's Department on March 20, 2013, and charged with raping a 12-year-old girl. Levy claimed the arrest was a political stunt by Smith in an effort to embarrass the district attorney; the sheriff's office issued press releases declaring Levy's address as Hossu's, though the latter "had not stayed there for months." Smith responded by saying that Levy was interfering with the investigation and that "Levy, 'or someone acting at his direction,' had even tipped off Hossu and coached him on what to say during a monitored call with the alleged rape victim prior to the arrest."

DA Levy contributed $30,000 to his friend's defense, and Hossu's lawyer was Levy's brother-in-law. Levy denied interfering in the criminal investigation nor knowing Hossu's visa status at the time of the arrest. Smith released a retraction "in which he apologized and acknowledged statements he made about Levy were 'untrue.'" In June 2017, Levy's defamation lawsuit against Smith was settled with the sheriff agreeing to drop his own lawsuit against Levy and pay $150,000 (equivalent to $197,020 in 2025). Of that amount, Smith paid $25,000 while Putnam County paid the rest. In late 2019, Hossu's lawsuit against Smith and the county was finalized: the government's insurer paid the man $500,000 (equivalent to $629,637 in 2025), while the county itself owed half as much.

== Community involvement ==
In the Putnam County region, Smith has been involved in community organizations including as president of the Westchester–Putnam Council of the Boy Scouts of America and the Mental Health Association in Putnam County. As of December 2017, Smith was the chairman of the American Security Council Foundation's board of directors.
