= Bambu (rolling papers) =

American rolling paper brand

Bambú is a brand of rolling paper sold by Bambu Sales Inc. in New York, New York. The company writes that Bambú began in Spain in 1764, originally for the Bible. The paper it sells is still manufactured in that country, by Miguel y Costas & Miguel, S.A. It offers a number of paper sizes — regular, big, half extra, and double wide — and a line of pure hemp papers which are packaged in Argentina and made in Spain.

== Cultural influence ==
Bambú became a pop culture reference during the 1970s with the release of the Cheech and Chong Big Bambu album. Since then, it has had many other musical references in pop culture by artists such as The Notorious B.I.G., Method Man, A Tribe Called Quest, and others. Bambú appeared on the front cover of the book Pot Culture. Dennis Wilson's second album was titled Bambu, after the rolling papers, and was released with Pacific Ocean Blue in 2008.

== See also ==
- List of rolling papers
