= Environmental Microbiology =

- Discipline: Microbiology
- Language: English

Publication details
- History: 1999-present
- Publisher: Wiley-Blackwell
- Frequency: Monthly
- Impact factor: 4.0 (2024)

Standard abbreviations
- ISO 4: Environ. Microbiol.

Indexing
- ISSN: 1462-2920

Links
- Journal homepage

Environmental Microbiology is a monthly peer-reviewed scientific journal focused on microbial interactions and microbial processes in the environment. It is published by Wiley-Blackwell. Until January 2024, it was an official journal of the Society for Applied Microbiology (now known as Applied Microbiology International), but is now no longer affiliated with that society. According to the Journal Citation Reports, the journal has a 2024 impact factor of 4.0.
