= Donnabella Lacap-Bugler =

Filipino molecular microbiologist

- Born: Donnabella Castillo Lacap

Academic background
- Education: St. Paul University Philippines, Ateneo de Manila University, University of Hong Kong
- Thesis: Biodiversity and ecology of geothermal springs in the Philippines (2007)
- Doctoral advisor: Stephen Brian Pointing

Academic work
- Institutions: Auckland University of Technology

Donnabella Castillo Lacap-Bugler (née Lacap) is a Filipino–New Zealand microbiologist and academic who is a full professor at the Auckland University of Technology, specialising in extremophiles, soil microbial ecology, and oral microorganisms.

== Academic career ==
Lacap-Bugler completed a Bachelor of Science degree at St Paul University and a Master of Science degree at Ateneo de Manila University in the Philippines. She went on to do a PhD titled Biodiversity and ecology of geothermal springs in the Philippines at the University of Hong Kong, supervised by Stephen Pointing. Lacap-Bugler joined the faculty of the Auckland University of Technology in 2015, becoming associate professor in 2019 and full professor in 2023.

Lacap-Bugler's research focus was initially on endophytic fungi on medicinal plants, and the molecular diversity of bacteria living in extreme environments during her postgraduate and postdoctoral work in Hong Kong. She led research into photosynthetic cyanobacteria in desert ecosystems in the McMurdo Dry Valleys of Antarctica, which may help in identifying traces of bacterial life in other extreme systems such as a Mars. More recently she has studied the microbial ecology of oral microorganisms and the link between oral pathology and systemic disease.

Lacap-Bugler is an associate investigator in the New Zealand's Biological Heritage National Science Challenge, where her students have researched the microbial communities in soils around kauri trees in the Waitākere Ranges Regional Park, and investigated their physicochemical makeup, looking to see if there are correlations with tree disease.

== Selected works ==
- Stephen B Pointing; Yuki Chan; Lacap, Donnabella C.; Maggie C.Y. Lau Vetter; Joel A Jurgens; Farrell, Roberta Lee (2009). "Highly specialized microbial diversity in hyper-arid polar desert". Proceedings of the National Academy of Sciences of the United States of America. 106 (47): 19964–19969. Bibcode:2009PNAS..10619964P. doi:10.1073/pnas.0908274106. PMC 2765924. PMID 19850879. Wikidata Q33511933. (Erratum: Bibcode:2010PNAS..107Q1254., doi:10.1073/pnas.0913882107, PMC 2824280, Wikidata Q93489917)
- Caruso, Tancredi; Yuki Chan; Lacap, Donnabella C.; Maggie C Y Lau; Christopher P McKay; Stephen B Pointing (2011). "Stochastic and deterministic processes interact in the assembly of desert microbial communities on a global scale". The ISME Journal. 5 (9): 1406–1413. doi:10.1038/ismej.2011.21. PMC 3160679. PMID 21368908. Wikidata Q35178343.
- Kimberley A Warren-Rhodes; Kevin L Rhodes; Stephen B Pointing; et al. (2006). "Hypolithic cyanobacteria, dry limit of photosynthesis, and microbial ecology in the hyperarid Atacama Desert". Microbial Ecology. 52 (3): 389–398. doi:10.1007/s00248-006-9055-7. PMID 16865610. Wikidata Q33251649.
- Justin Bahl; Maggie C Y Lau; Smith, Gavin; et al. (2011). "Ancient origins determine global biogeography of hot and cold desert cyanobacteria". Nature Communications. 2: 163. Bibcode:2011NatCo...2..163B. doi:10.1038/ncomms1167. PMC 3105302. PMID 21266963. Wikidata Q28744099.
- Stephen B Pointing; Kimberley A Warren-Rhodes; Lacap, Donnabella C.; Kevin L Rhodes; Christopher P McKay (2007). "Hypolithic community shifts occur as a result of liquid water availability along environmental gradients in China's hot and cold hyperarid deserts". Environmental Microbiology. 9 (2): 414–424. doi:10.1111/j.1462-2920.2006.01153.x. PMID 17222139. Wikidata Q39361751.
- Yuki Chan; Lacap, Donnabella C.; Maggie C.Y. Lau Vetter; et al. (2012). "Hypolithic microbial communities: between a rock and a hard place". Environmental Microbiology. 14 (9): 2272–2282. doi:10.1111/j.1462-2920.2012.02821.x. PMID 22779750. Wikidata Q34332240.
- Lacap, Donnabella C.; Hyde, Kevin; E C Y Liew (2003). "An evaluation of the fungal 'morphotype' concept based on ribosomal DNA sequences" (PDF). Fungal Diversity. 12: 53–66. ISSN 1560-2745. Wikidata Q110861496. Archived from the original (PDF) on 13 April 2021.
