= Bugel =

Bugel is a surname. Notable people with the surname include:

- Caspar Peter Bügel (1759–1817), German-Danish merchant and landowner
- Cornelia Bügel (born 1957), German rower
- Joe Bugel (1940–2020), American football coach
