= Applied Microbiology International =

Scientific organization based in the UK

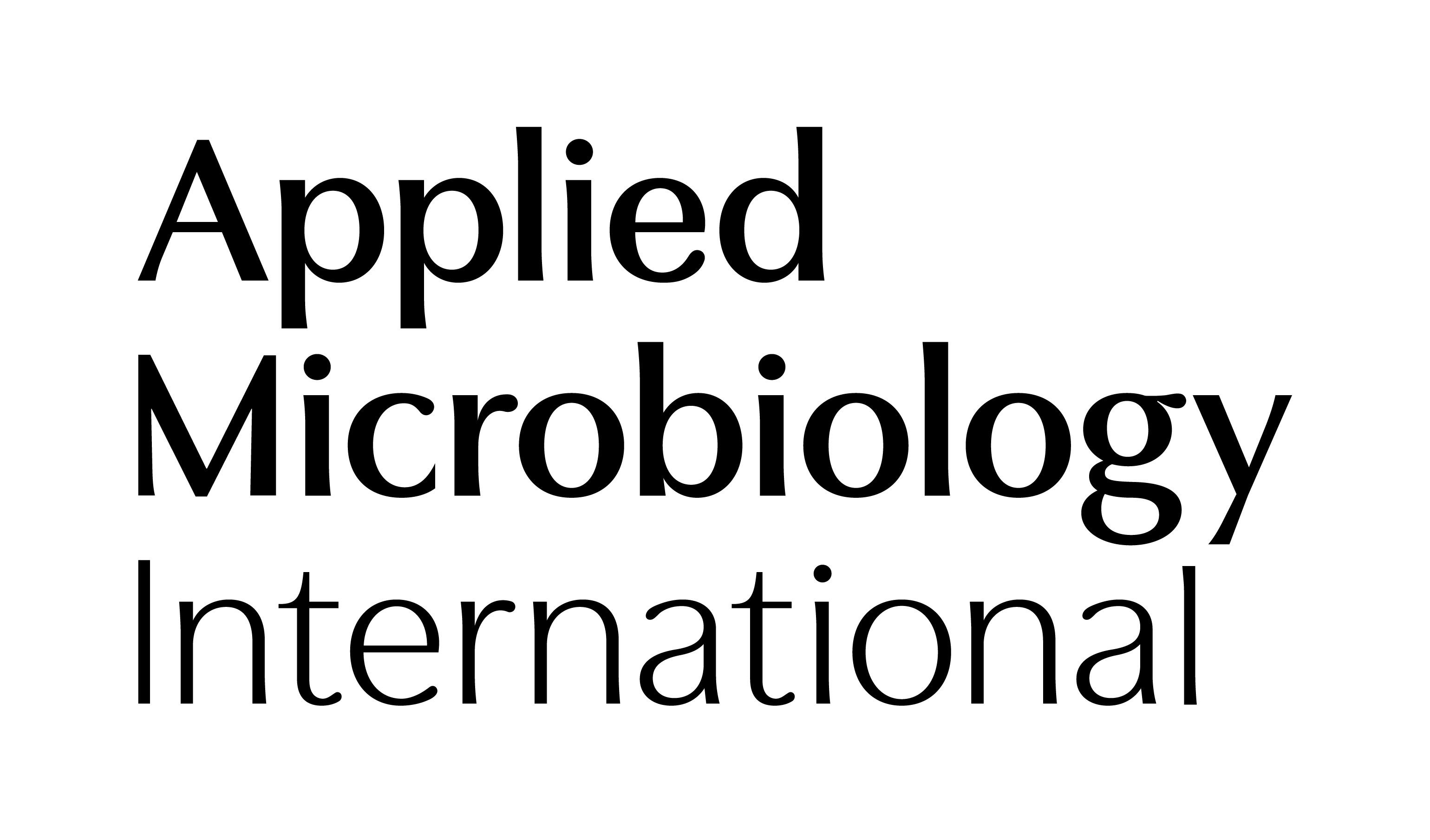
- Founded: 1931
- Type: Non-profit
- Members: 7,000 (2026)
- Key people: President: Professor Jack Gilbert
- Website: https://www.appliedmicrobiology.org

Applied Microbiology International, formally known as the Society for Applied Microbiology (SfAM), is the oldest microbiology society in the UK founded in 1931. Its objective is to advance for the benefit of the public the science of microbiology in its application to the environment, human and animal health, agriculture and industry. Applied Microbiology International is an active member of the Royal Society of Biology, and the Federation of European Microbiological Societies. The organisation's current president is Professor Jack Gilbert.

== Publications ==
The organisation is responsible for the publication of three academic journals:

- Journal of Applied Microbiology
- Letters in Applied Microbiology
- Sustainable Microbiology

The organisation also publishes the digital magazine The Microbiologist.

== Events ==
Applied Microbiology International holds a number of scientific meetings every year including its Early Career Scientist Research Symposium and two lecture evenings which celebrate the success of the journals Environmental Microbiology and the Journal of Applied Microbiology.

== Membership ==
Applied Microbiology International is based in the United Kingdom and has members from all over the world. There are several membership levels enabling anyone with an interest in microbiology to become eligible for membership.

== Grants and awards ==
The organisation has an extensive range of grants and awards available to all Members.

== Horizon Awards ==
The Horizon Awards recognise excellence across diverse domains of applied microbiology, highlighting the field’s contribution to tackling global challenges. Originally established in 1984, the W. H. Pierce Prize was created to commemorate the life and work of the late W H (Bill) Pierce, former Chief Bacteriologist at Oxo Ltd. and long-time member of the Society. The prize has traditionally been awarded annually to a young microbiologist who has made a substantial contribution to the field of applied microbiology. In 2022, the Society built upon this legacy by launching a new portfolio of awards under the collective title Horizon Awards. Each individual prize recognises a distinct area of impact within applied microbiology:

- WH Pierce Global Impact in Microbiology Prize
- Basil Jarvis Food Security and Innovation Award
- John Snow Public Health Innovation Prize
- Christiana Figueres Policy to Practice Award
- Rachel Carson Environmental Conservation Excellence Award
- Dorothy Jones Diversity and Inclusion Achievement Award

Together, these prizes recognise scientific innovation, social responsibility, and the application of microbiology to address challenges related to human and environmental health.

== See also ==
- American Society for Microbiology
- Federation of European Microbiological Societies
- Royal Society of Biology
