= Juicy Jay's =

US company

- Company type: Private
- Industry: Rolling papers; Food, Beverage, Tobacco; Manufacturing
- Headquarters: Chicago, Illinois
- Website: JuicyJays.com

Juicy Jay's is a brand of flavored rolling paper, cigar tobaccos, and cigar wraps. Each paper has a printed pattern to match its flavor, and features a sugar-based gum. It is one of the few brands of flavored papers remaining in the US after an FDA legal challenge. Juicy Jay's comes in a number of flavors such as orange, cotton candy, or watermelon.

== History ==
Juicy Jay's was founded by Joshua Kesselman. In the 1980s on a trip to Queens, New York, Kesselman was given the nickname "Cool J." The first flavored wrap produced was menthol and was branded "Cool Jay's." The next flavor wrap created was watermelon and termed "Juicy Jay’s Watermelon" and was the first iteration of the company name.

In 2009, Juicy Jay's sued the FDA in order to protect their products in the US marketplace. A Federal court case ensued and the result being that Juicy Jay's are still available in the United States.

As of 2018 Juicy Jay's produced more than 30 different flavors, including Green Apple, Strawberry, and Banana.

Juicy Jay's also distributes a line of cigar wrappers named Juicy Wraps along with loose cigar rolling tobaccos. Each plastic package contains a cigar wrapper on a plastic sheet wrapped around a plastic straw. The company has a line of extra large cigar wraps named Juicy Wraps Super Wrap, each box features a cone-shaped cigar wrapper around a plastic tube inside of a foil wrapper.

In addition to these products, Juicy Jay's also produces a new line called Juicy Jay's Natural Leaf Wraps, which are natural tobacco leaf wraps that come in packages of eight in a resealable foil pouch.

Juicy Wraps Super Wrap and Juicy Jay's Natural Wraps feature a flavour line similar to that of Juicy Wraps. Juicy Jay's cigar rolling tobaccos are a short-fill tobacco that come in 4oz bags and are also available in various flavors.

== See also ==
- Shag (tobacco)
- Tobacco smoking
- List of rolling papers
