= Roll-your-own cigarette =

Cigarette assembled by the user as opposed to a manufacturer

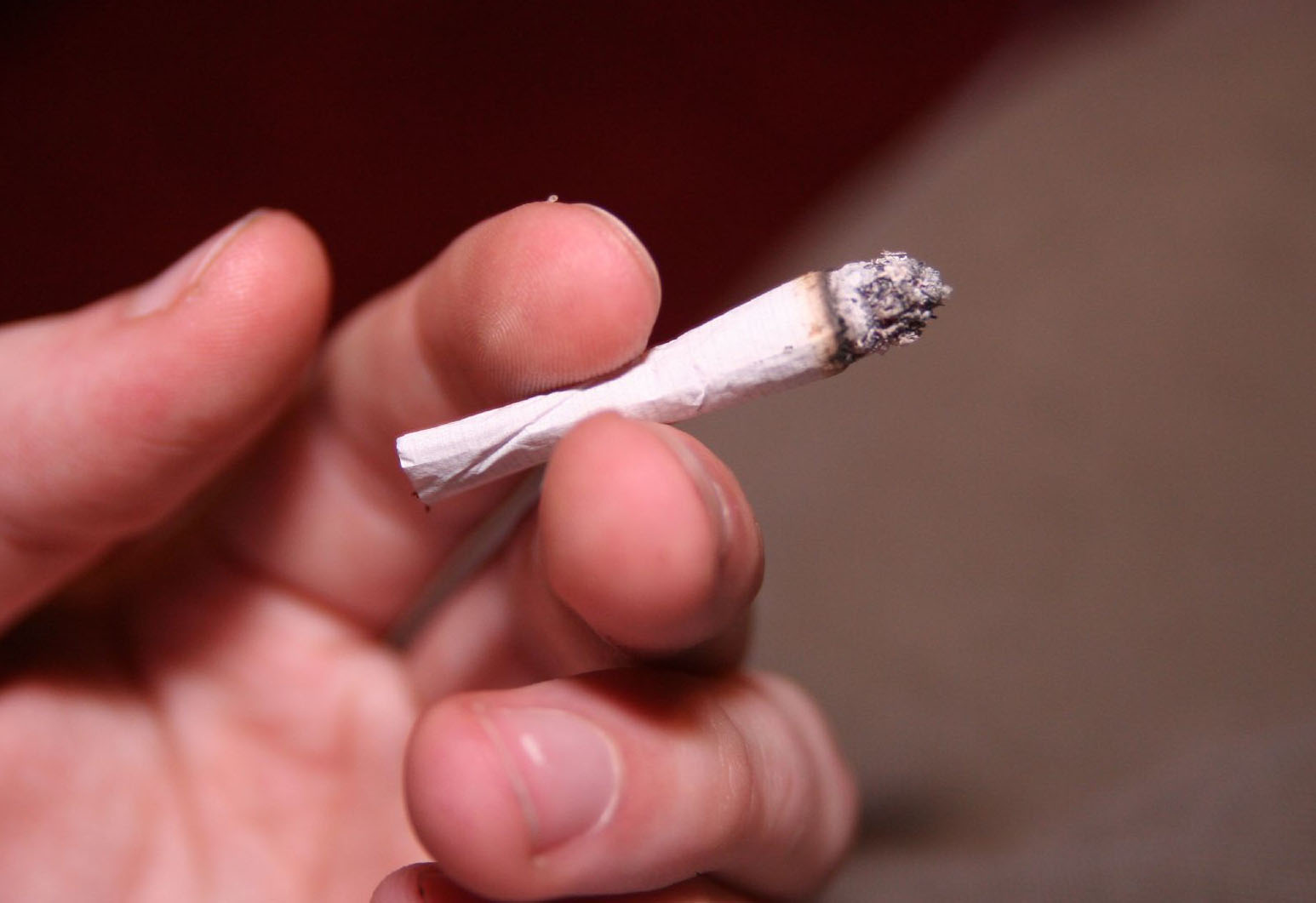
A roll-your-own cigarette

A roll-your-own (RYO) cigarette, also called a handrolled cigarette, roll-up or rollie, is a cigarette made from loose tobacco (usually a shag cut) and rolling paper. Factory-made cigarettes are called industrial or tailor-made cigarettes. U.S. federal law defines 'roll-your-own tobacco' as tobacco that, because of its appearance, type, packaging, or labeling, is suitable for use and likely to be offered to, or purchased by, consumers as tobacco for making cigarettes.

== Rolling tobacco ==
Rolling tobacco, or cigarette tobacco, is the primary tobacco used for RYO cigarettes. It is generally packaged in pouches.

After 2009, the United States federal tax rate on RYO tobacco was raised from $1.0969 per pound to $24.78 per pound. This increase has caused many people to switch to using pipe tobacco to make cigarettes, since the pipe tobacco tax rate was also increased, but only to $2.83 per pound.

A Tobacco Control (BMJ) analysis reported that after the U.S. federal tax disparity was created, retailers began offering cigarette rolling machines for consumers to use. The U.S. Government Accountability Office reported in 2025 that because pipe tobacco is taxed at a lower rate than roll-your-own tobacco, "consumers who hand roll cigarettes may have an incentive to use pipe tobacco", and that manufacturers also had an incentive to relabel products as pipe tobacco.

In Australia, loose tobacco was historically taxed less than manufactured cigarettes until September 2016. Australia's tax treatment of loose tobacco products, such as roll-your-own tobacco, was aligned with the per-stick excise rate for manufactured cigarettes by progressively lowering the equivalisation weight from 0.7 grams to 0.6 grams, which came fully into effect on 1 September 2026.

In the United Kingdom, HM Revenue & Customs raised tobacco duty rates from 30 October 2024, applying the standard tobacco-duty escalator and increasing the duty rate for hand-rolling tobacco by an additional 10% (to 12% above the Retail Price Index). In January 2026, a Tobacco Control (BMJ) study discussed the UK affordability gap between hand-rolling tobacco and factory-made cigarettes and modelled scenarios for increasing hand-rolling tobacco duty to reduce that gap.

Ireland's Budget 2026 (October 2025) increased tobacco excise, with the government reporting pro-rata increases applying to other tobacco products, including roll-your-own tobacco.

== Cigarette rolling ==
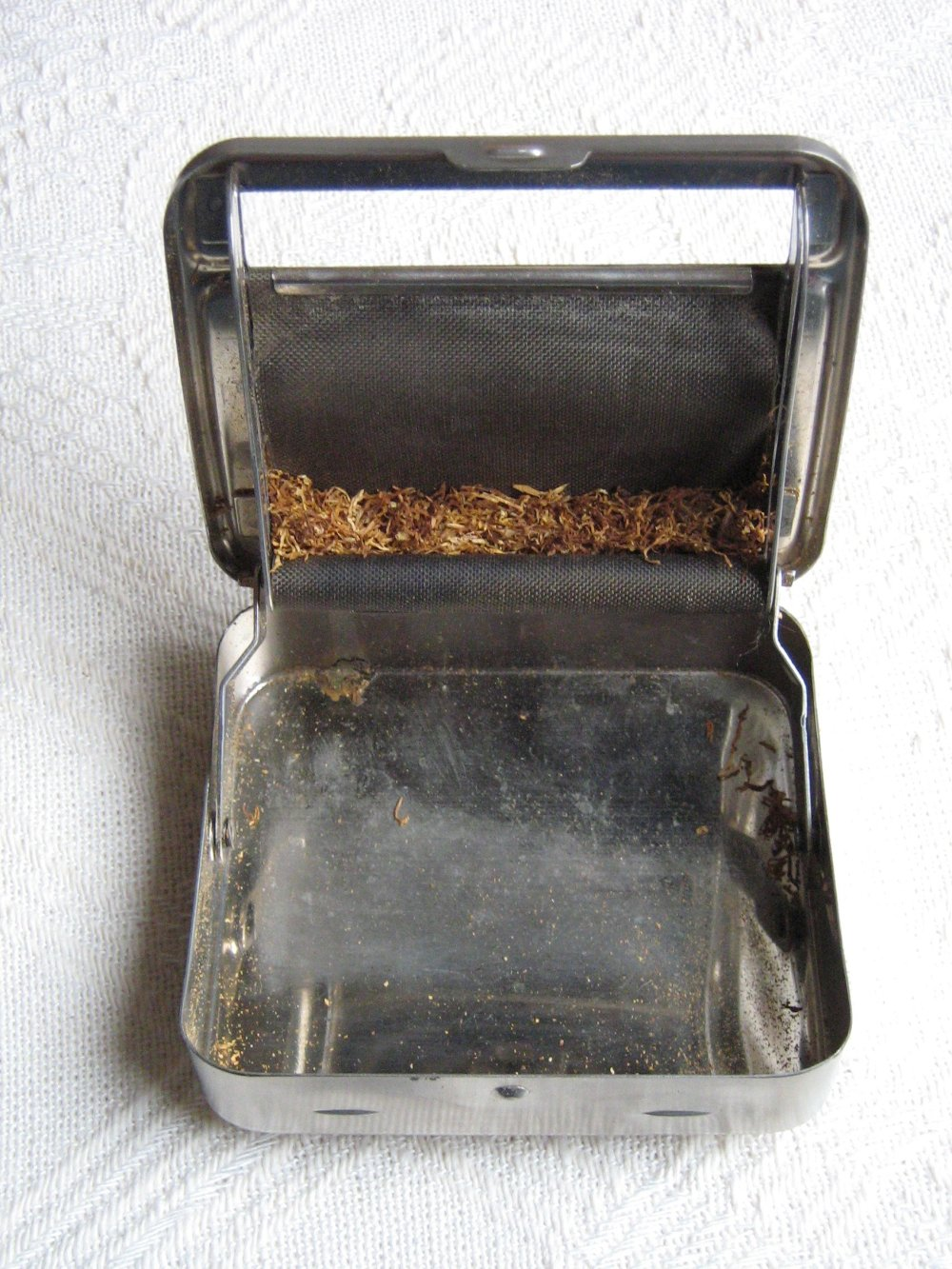
German cigarette roller

Cigarette rolling may be done either by hand or with a cigarette roller. It should not be confused with cigarette stuffer.

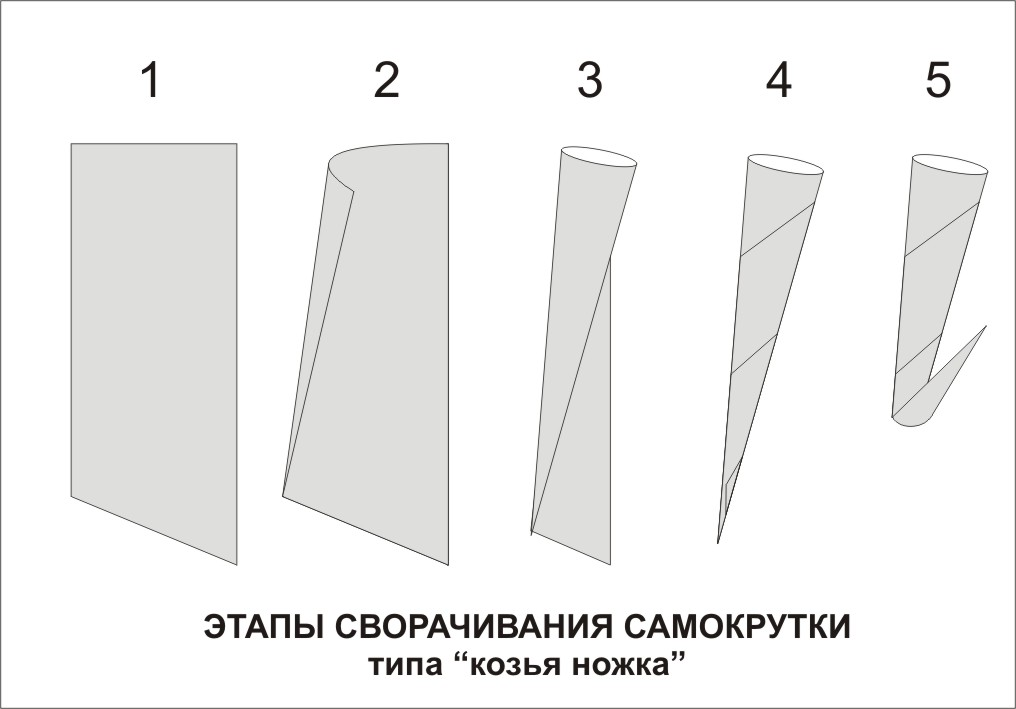
"Goat's leg" rolling

In Russia a special kind of self-rolled cigarette was in use, called "goat's leg" (Russian: козья ножка). A paper (commonly a newspaper paper) was rolled in a cone, which was bent in half in the middle and the wider part was filled with tobacco. In a way, it resembled a tobacco pipe.

== Prevalence ==
As of 2006, relatively few smokers in the United States (6.7%) rolled their own cigarettes. In contrast, this rate was 17.1% in Canada, 24.2% in Australia, and 28.4% in the United Kingdom. Reasons for this difference include the generally lower price of traditional cigarettes in most states in the US compared to Canada and Europe.

== See also ==
- Do it yourself
- Joint (cannabis)
- List of rolling papers
- Shag (tobacco)
- Tobacco smoking
