= Rolling paper =

Paper used for making cigarettes

Rolling paper is a specialty paper used for making cigarettes (commercially manufactured filter cigarettes and individually made roll-your-own cigarettes) and related items (e.g., cannabis joints). Rolling papers often sold as packs of several cigarette-size sheets. Paper cigarettes became popular in the second half of the 19th century and rolling paper companies emerged to produce the paper.

== Description ==
Rolling paper is a specialty paper intended to be used for making cigarettes (commercially manufactured filter cigarettes and individually made roll-your-own cigarettes). Rolling papers are also used for rolling cannabis cigarettes called joints. They are also known as blanks, which are used to encase tobacco or cannabis.

Rolling papers are typically sold in packs of several cigarette-size sheets, often folded inside a cardboard wrapper. The paper may be flavoured.

Filter cigarette: 1. Cigarette filter; 2. Imitation cork tip paper; 3. Cigarette paper; 4. Tobacco; 5. Capsule (optional, not shown); 6. Ink (not shown); 7. Glue (not shown)

== History ==
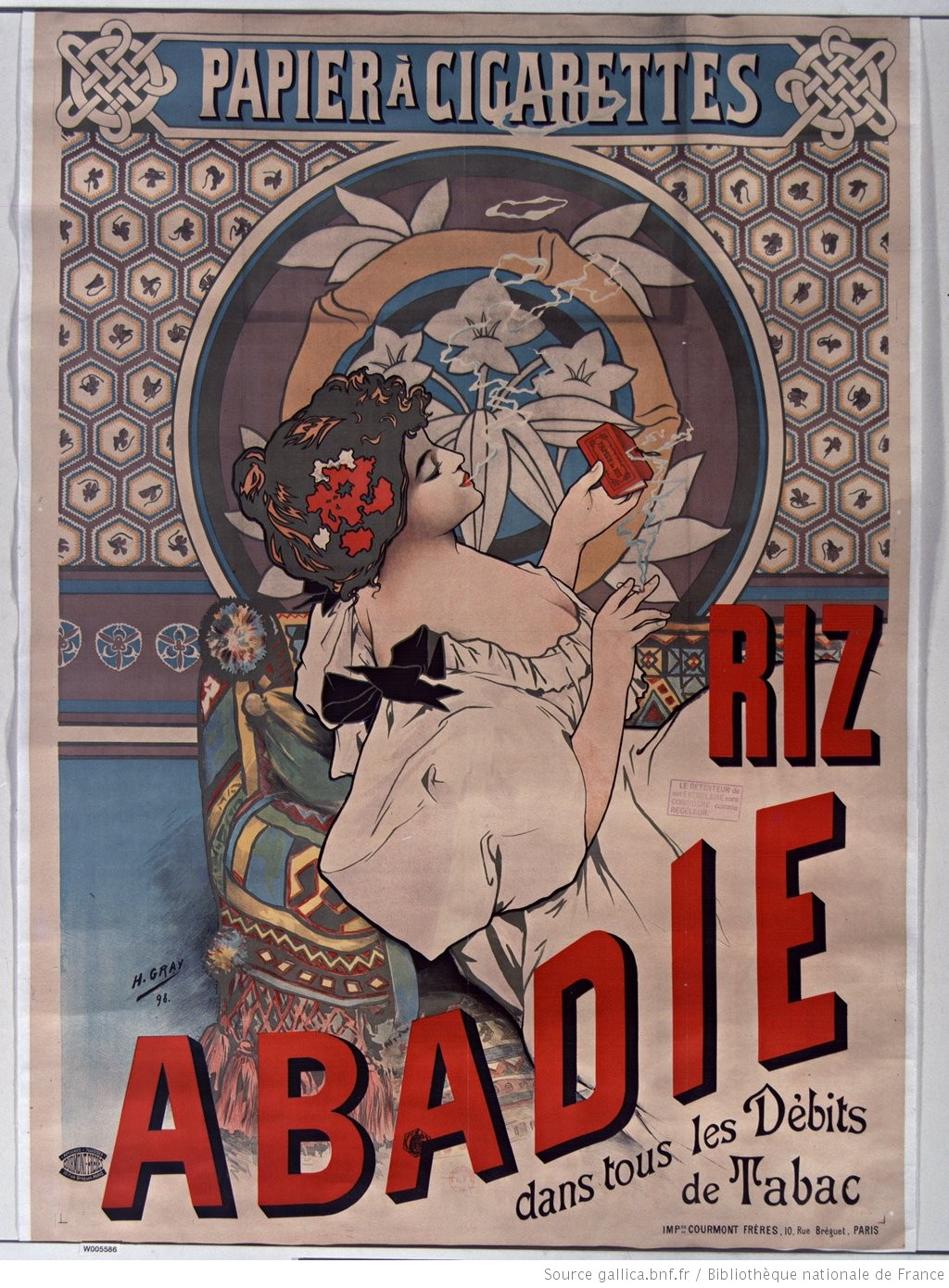
1898 French cigarette paper advertisement poster

Paper cigarettes became popular in the second half of the 19th century, displacing the more expensive cigars and cigarillos.

As cigars and cigarillos were expensive, the beggars of Spain would collect the cigar butts from the ground and roll them in pieces of paper to be smoked. During the Crimean War this culture became more prevalent and British soldiers learned how to roll tobacco in newspapers. Frequent use of rolling paper became a custom, and to fulfil the need, rolling paper companies Pay-Pay, Smoking, and Rizla emerged.

== Composition ==
Fillers used include calcium carbonate, magnesium carbonate, and titanium oxide. Sodium potassium tartrate (Seignette's salt), sodium and potassium citrate are used as a combustion regulator in cigarette paper, increased levels result in faster burning papers. Polyvinyl alcohol in aqueous solution is used for cigarette adhesives.

A study of commercially available rolling papers found that concentrations of several elements, particularly copper, chromium, and vanadium in some products, may present a hazard to frequent users. Of particular concern is the concentration of copper from pigments used in the papers might result in exposures as high as 4.5–11 times the maximum exposure limits.

Permeability is defined as the measure of the volume of air that flows through a specified area of cigarette paper in a given unit of time. It is measured in CORESTA units. US commercial filter cigarette brands have paper permeability between 14 and 51 CORESTA units. Increased cigarette paper permeability results in increased smoke dilution with air.

Fire-resistant cigarettes, which reduce the risk of fire from unattended cigarettes, are made with special paper that includes a plastic compound, ethylene vinyl acetate. If a cigarette made with this type of paper is left unattended, the plastic in the paper will help the cigarette self-extinguish.

The tip paper may be covered with polyvinyl alcohol in certain, specialist, varieties.

== Consumption ==
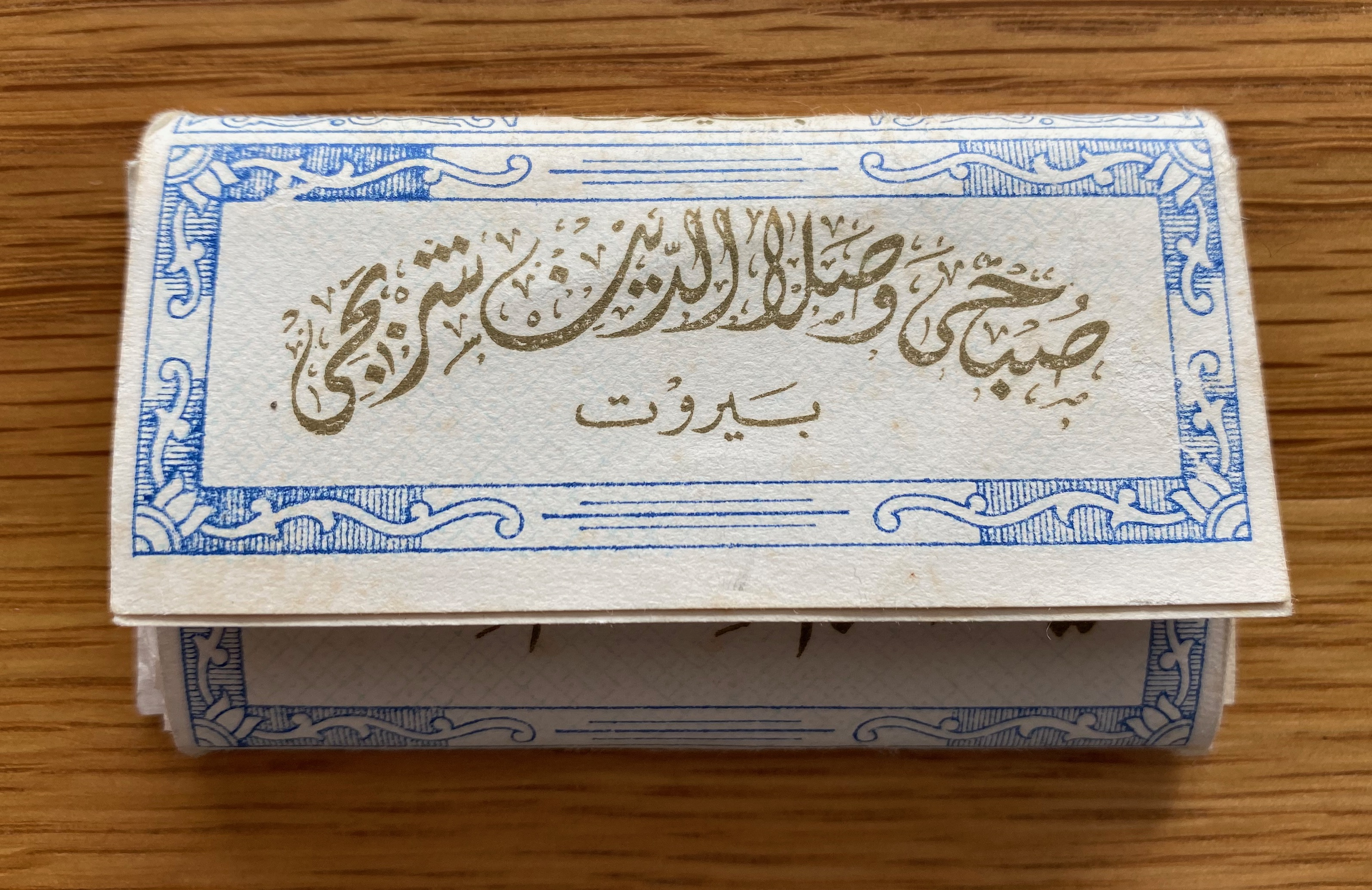
Ungummed rolling paper packet from Lebanon

=== United States ===
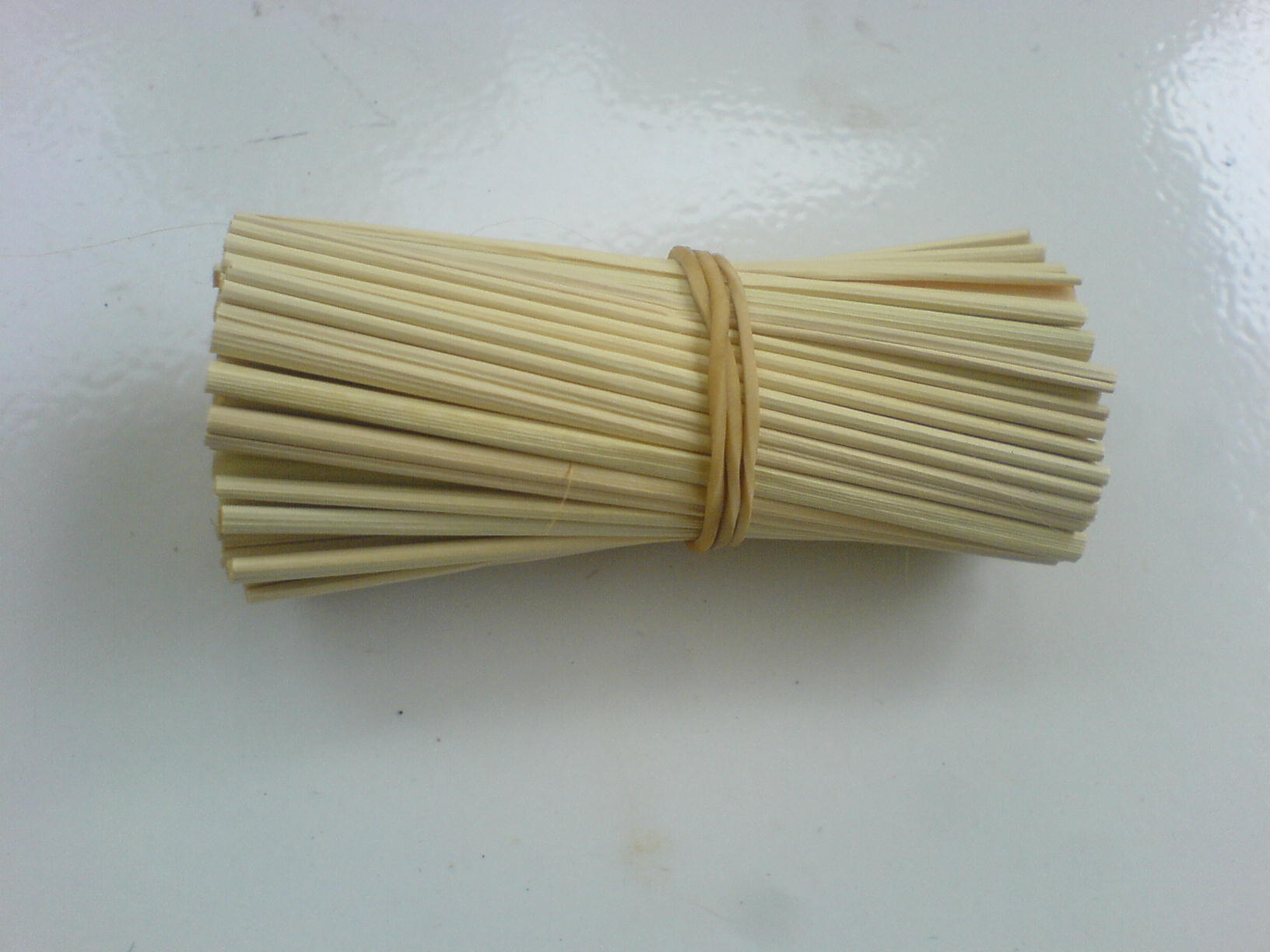
Rolling paper from Nypa fruticans leaf

In 2008, Tobacconist Magazine called roll-your-own (RYO) the tobacco industry's fastest growing segment. It estimates that 2–4% of cigarette smokers in the United States, or approximately 2.6 million people, make their own cigarettes. Many of these smokers have switched in response to increasingly high taxes on manufactured cigarettes.

=== Canada ===
In 2000, a Canadian government survey estimated that 9% of Canada's six million cigarette smokers smoked hand-rolled cigarettes "sometimes or most of the time", 7% smoked roll-your-owns "exclusively", and over 90% of rolling papers sold in Canada were for tobacco consumption. A more recent 2009 study has shown that approximately 925,000 Canadians roll their own cigarettes.

=== United Kingdom ===
According to The Publican, "Low price RYO has seen an astonishing rise of 175% in [2007] as cigarette smokers look for cheaper alternatives and to control the size of their smoke". The National Health Service has reported that roll-your-own use has more than doubled since 1990, from 11% to 24%. Many of these smokers apparently believe that hand-rolled cigarettes are less harmful than manufactured products, although it is equally possible that the increase is due to the steep rise in prices since the early-1990s to the present day.

=== Thailand ===
In Thailand, smokers of roll-your-own cigarettes have long outnumbered smokers of manufactured brands. A 2008 survey found that 58% of surveyed smokers in Thailand rolled their own cigarettes, compared to just 17% in neighbouring Malaysia.

=== New Zealand ===
The New Zealand Ministry of Health reported in 2005 that: "The ratio of roll-your-own to manufactured or tailor-made cigarettes consumed by New Zealanders has risen over (at least) the past decade, perhaps reflecting price differences between these products, and currently approaching 50 percent overall."

== Taxation ==
Consumers' switching to roll-your-own has led to a response among certain tax authorities. In the United States, Indiana and Kentucky tax rolling papers. Kentucky set its tax at $0.25 per pack (for up to 32 leaves, larger packs are taxed at $0.0078 per leaf) in 2006 despite complaints from manufacturers. Louisiana Revised Statute 47:338.261 allows up to $1.25 per pack at retail.

== Regulation ==
=== United States ===
The FDA stated in 2011 that every brand (including private labels) of cigarette rolling papers sold in the US must submit their ingredients and seek agency approval or withdraw from the marketplace by March of that year if they had not been sold in the US before February 15, 2007.

== See also ==
- List of rolling papers
