= Maverick (cigarette) =

American brand of cigarettes

- Product type: Cigarette
- Current owner: Imperial Brands (2015–)
- Produced by: ITG Brands
- Country: United States
- Introduced: 1986; 40 years ago
- Markets: See Markets
- Previous owners: Lorillard

Maverick (originally branded as Harley Davidson), is an American brand of cigarettes, currently owned and manufactured by ITG Brands, a subsidiary of Imperial Tobacco.

== History ==
Maverick pack

Mavericks were originally introduced on a limited basis in 1996 and branded as Harley Davidson cigarettes by the Lorillard Tobacco Company. Despite a large advertising campaign during the early-mid 1990s, the relationship between Harley Davidson and Lorillard soured, with each company filing lawsuits against the other; the result was that Lorillard had the right to continue marketing the cigarettes under the Harley Davidson brand until 2001, however, they rebranded them as Maverick in 1998. In the US, Maverick is in the discount price level of the cigarette market. They are available in packs of 20.

In order to comply with FDA regulations, Mavericks' former owner, Lorillard, had until June 22, 2010, to rebrand tobacco products marketed as "Lights", "Ultra-Lights", "Medium", "Mild", "Full Flavor", or similar designations to belie the impression that some tobacco products are comparatively safe.

In May 2015, R. J. Reynolds Tobacco Company bought the Lorillard Tobacco Company, but the FDA demanded that four brands be sold off to Imperial Tobacco to prevent a market monopoly. The brands that were sold off were Kool, Salem, Winston and Maverick, as well as blu eCigs.

On July 14, 2016, the FDA ordered that Maverick Menthol Silver Box 100s stop being sold under the Not Substantially Equivalent (NSE) order.

== Markets ==
Maverick is mainly sold in the United States, but is also sold in Germany, Austria and Switzerland.

== Varieties ==
=== United States ===
- Full Flavor Kings
- Full Flavor 100s
- Gold Kings (previously Lights)
- Gold 100s (previously Lights)
- Silver 100s (previously Ultra Lights)
- Menthol Kings
- Menthol 100s
- Menthol Gold 100s (previously Menthol Lights)
- Menthol Silver 100s (previously Menthol Ultra Light) [Discontinued]

=== Austria ===
- Maverick American Blend Kings: Box
- Maverick American Lights Kings: Box

== See also ==
- Cigarette
- Tobacco smoking
