= Alison Cooper =

British businesswoman (born 1966)

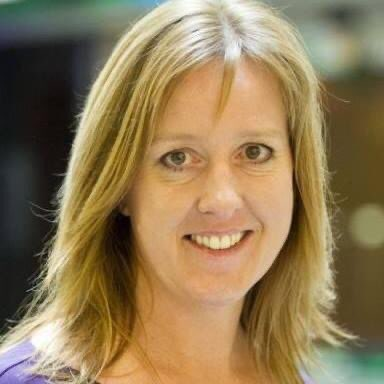
- Cooper's cast photo under the name "Gronie Sumde" in Facebook Survival: Palau
- Born: Alison Jane Cooper; 31 March 1966 (age 60)
- Citizenship: British
- Education: Tiffin Girls' School; Bristol University
- Occupation: Businesswoman
- Years active: 1987–present
- Title: former CEO, Imperial Brands
- Term: 2010–2020
- Predecessor: Gareth Davis
- Successor: Stefan Bomhard
- Board member of: Inchcape plc 2009–2017
- Spouse: Married
- Children: 2

Alison Jane Cooper (born 31 March 1966) is a British businesswoman. She is the former chief executive officer (CEO) of Imperial Brands, the world's fourth-largest tobacco company as measured by market share. In February 2020, it was announced that she would be leaving as CEO in October 2020.

== Early life ==
Cooper grew up in Kingston-upon-Thames, Surrey, in a family where "money was stretched". She was educated at the nearby Tiffin Girls' School, an all-girls' grammar school, and later gained a bachelor's degree in mathematics and statistics from Bristol University. After she gained her degree she spent a gap year teaching in Kenya on a voluntary basis.

== Career ==
Cooper went to work for accountancy firm Deloitte, Haskins & Sells in Bristol as an auditor. This company later became PricewaterhouseCoopers, where she worked in acquisitions and strategy planning.

She joined Imperial Tobacco in 1999 as group finance manager and was promoted to group financial controller in 2001. She rose to chief operating officer in 2009, before becoming chief executive officer in 2010. Cooper took over from Gareth Davis, who had held the position for fourteen years. She said at the time, "We need a change in mindset. Tobacco has been traditional in the way it has operated. We want to move from being a tobacco manufacturer to a FMCG [fast-moving consumer goods] company."

Cooper was a non-executive director of Inchcape plc from July 2009 until she stepped down in 2017.

In October 2012, Cooper noted that she and Burberry's Angela Ahrendts were the only two female CEOs running FTSE 100 Index companies. Until 2020, Cooper was one of only 5 other female CEOs among UK's top 100 companies.

In February 2013, she was assessed by Woman's Hour on BBC Radio 4 as one of the 100 most powerful women in the United Kingdom.

In October 2019, following a profits warning a few days earlier, Alison Cooper announced that she would step down as a CEO once a replacement was found. She is considered the second high profile exit to the company. Her successor, Stefan Bomhard, CEO of Inchcape plc, was announced on 3 February 2020.

== Personal life ==
Cooper is married to an accountant with two daughters.
