= Peter Stuyvesant (disambiguation) =

Peter Stuyvesant (1610–1672) was a Dutch colonial officer, the last Dutch director-general of the colony of New Netherland.

Peter Stuyvesant may also refer to:

- Peter Stuyvesant (merchant) (1727–1805), New York landowner and merchant
- Peter Gerard Stuyvesant (1778–1847), American landowner and philanthropist
- Peter Stuyvesant (cigarette), a brand of cigarettes
