= Golden Virgin =

Golden Virgin may refer to:

- The Golden Virgin, a 1897 sculpture by Albert Roze
- The Golden Virgins, an English pop and rock group

== See also ==
- Golden Virginia, an English tobacco brand
