= ITG Brands =

US tobacco company

ITG Brands, LLC
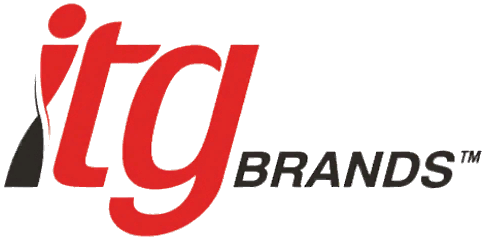
- Type: Subsidiary
- Industry: Tobacco
- Founded: 2015; 11 years ago
- Headquarters: Greensboro, North Carolina, U.S.
- Area served: United States
- Key people: Kim Reed (CEO)
- Number of employees: 5,000
- Parent: Imperial Brands
- Website: itgbrands.com

ITG Brands, LLC is the third-largest tobacco manufacturing company in the US. It is a subsidiary of British Imperial Brands. ITG Brands markets and sells multiple cigarette and cigar brands and sells blu eCigs. The company was created in 2015 and has its production, headquarters, and regulatory compliance facilities located in Greensboro, North Carolina.

== History ==
ITG Brands was formed in June 2015 as an American subsidiary of multinational conglomerate Imperial Brands. After competing tobacco companies Reynolds American Inc. and Lorillard Inc. merged in 2015, they were required by the FTC to divest four cigarette brands. Imperial then acquired cigarette brands Winston, Salem, Kool, and Maverick, along with blu eCigs from the Reynolds American-Lorillard merger for $7.1 billion. Cigar brands already owned by Imperial included Backwoods, Dutch Masters, and Phillies. David Taylor, the CFO of Lorillard Inc. pre-merger, became ITG Brands’ first CEO in 2015.

ITG Brands announced it would close the Reidsville manufacturing plant by April 2020, "affecting 117 manufacturing jobs." It planned to move manufacturing to Greensboro, North Carolina. As of 2022, the number of Greensboro employees was down to 895 from 1700 in 2015.

ITG Brands was one of three tobacco companies warned by the Food and Drug Administration that "they did not have the agency’s approval to claim that their products were free of certain harmful substances, or that they posed less risk to consumers than other tobacco products."

ITG Brands donated $25,000 to the North Carolina Disaster Relief Fund to provide relief for Hurricane Florence.

In 2021, Kim Reed was named as president and CEO.

In 2023, ITG Brands forced the closure of the historic "Winston Cup Museum" located in Winston-Salem, NC due to numerous copyright lawsuits filed against the small business.

== Brands ==
- Antonio y Cleopatra
- Backwoods Smokes
- blu eCigs
- Crowns
- Dutch Masters
- El Producto
- Hav-A-Tampa
- Kool
- Maverick
- Montclair
- Phillies
- Rave
- Salem
- Sonoma
- USA Gold
- White Cat
- Winston
- Zone
