= Salem (cigarette) =

American cigarette brand

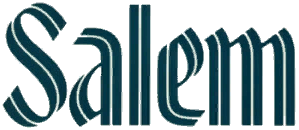
- Product type: Cigarette
- Current owner: Imperial Tobacco (2015–)
- Produced by: ITG Brands (U.S. only); Japan Tobacco (Outside the U.S.)
- Country: United States
- Introduced: 1956; 70 years ago
- Markets: See Markets
- Previous owners: R.J. Reynolds (1956–2015)

Salem is an American brand of cigarettes, currently owned and manufactured by ITG Brands, a subsidiary of Imperial Tobacco, inside the U.S. and by Japan Tobacco outside the United States.

== History ==
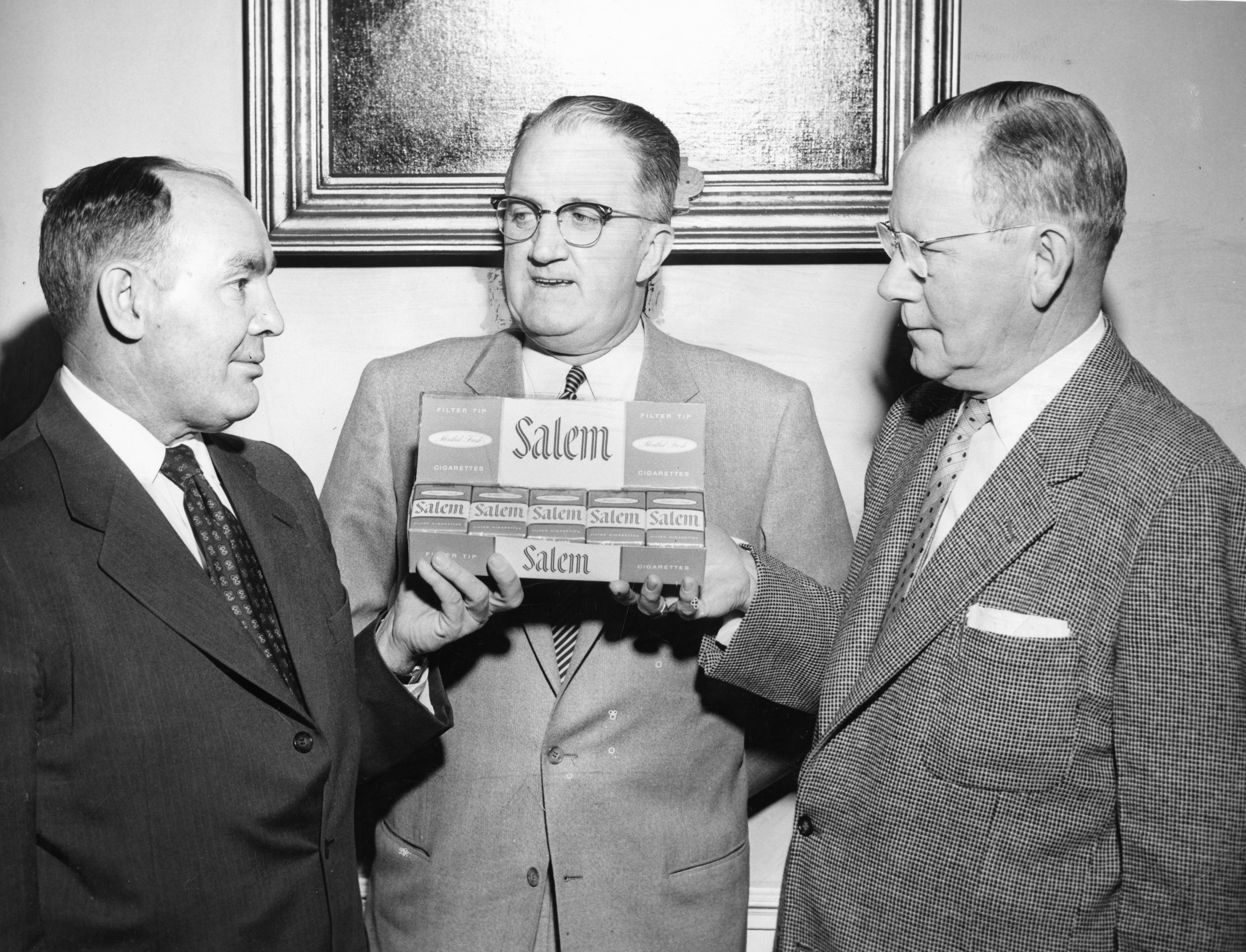
The first carton of Salem cigarettes is presented to Salem, Massachusetts Mayor Francis X. Collins by R.J. Reynolds New England Department Manager F.L. Hanna

Salem was launched in 1956 by the R.J. Reynolds Tobacco Company as the first filter-tipped menthol cigarette. When the brand was introduced in 1956, Salem's slogan was "Take a puff, it's springtime" which was used for several years afterwards.

Its name (along with that of the Winston brand) derives from Winston-Salem, North Carolina, the city where RJR was founded and headquartered.

In 2015, Salem was sold to Imperial Tobacco Group as a divestiture during Reynolds' acquisition of Lorillard Tobacco Company.

== Marketing ==
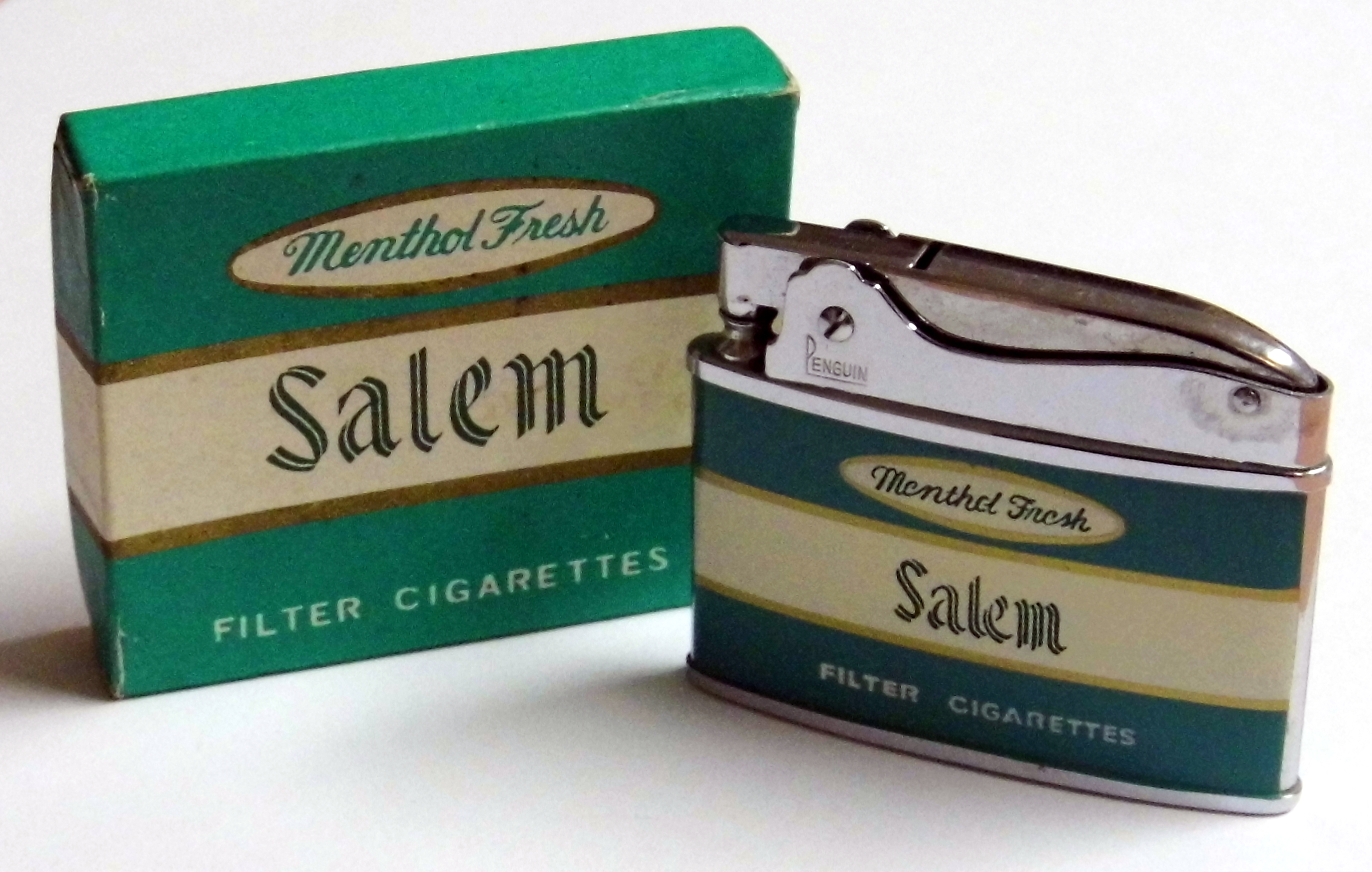
A Salem lighter made in Japan

In 1982, Salem rebranded their product with focus toward a younger demographic and launched a new campaign called "Salem Spirit". The new campaign served to rival Newport's ongoing efforts targeting youth and attempted to steal Kool's declining young customer base. In Salem Spirit, groups of young men and women are seen to bond together over fun, youthful activities, ranging from sledding and hot air ballooning to picnicking and frolicking in the ocean. Internal R.J. Reynolds documents described the Salem smoker as self-confident, up-to-date, and as younger adult smokers (18-23) who were characterized as social leaders/catalysts uniquely possessing a sense of humor/wit, spontaneity, warmth and unpretentious style that made them fun and exciting to be with. The ads were constructed carefully in order to target this very specific demographic in many ways. One way was the use of what R.J. Reynolds referred to as "refreshment communicators". Used to reflect the potentially unknown sensations of menthol to new smokers, refreshment communicators included greenery, water, snow, and outdoor situations.

Another method for attracting youth was through the campaign's use of young, fun-loving models: Model attitudes would continue to advance the campaign's imagery through a warmth/caring focus as a vehicle to reflect a sense of group belonging and peer group acceptance, one document explains, citing the equivalent of peer pressure as a primary method for hooking youth. This is an important element differentiating the Spirit campaign from Newport's exclusive coupling. Model closeness would be emphasized to gain social smoking acceptability. Another result of model closeness was that the activities all felt younger and almost childlike. Indeed, sharing a big drink at a picnic, sledding together, swinging on a tree swing, or playing chicken at the beach are all childish activities that contrast strikingly with any claims that the ads targeted solely adult audiences.

Various adverts were made to promote the brand. Salem ads from the 2000s feature the slogan "Take a puff, it's springtime" and each ad depicts a model smoking in green, mentholated ecstasy. Other Salem ads from the 2000s reveal clear youth targeting through a risk-taking appeal. For example, one of the ads presents an underground party, another presents a couple with an intertwining, extreme tattoo, and a third presents a scantily clad woman riding on the back of a man's motorcycle all in urban settings.

== Sport sponsorship ==
Until the early 2000s, Salem was a sponsor of the Hong Kong Open, an ATP tennis tournament, which attracted a number of top ranking professional players. As a result of the sponsorship, it was titled the Salem Open. Salem also sponsored a number of events there including concerts throughout Asia.

In 2001, as with legislation restricting tobacco sponsorship in Hong Kong, the tournament sponsorship was proven to be controversial, when its official logo was altered to include the logo of Perrier, causing anti-smoking campaigners to claim that the organizers exploited a loophole in its sponsorship clause.

== Markets ==
Salem is mainly sold in the United States, but also was or still is sold in Canada, British Virgin Islands, Mexico, Cuba, Chile, Brazil, Peru, Argentina, Iceland, Finland, West Germany, Germany, Spain, Italy, Poland, Hungary, Lithuania, Russia, Turkey, Singapore, Thailand, Malaysia, Taiwan, Hong Kong, Philippines, Japan and South Korea.

== See also ==
- Tobacco smoking

== Bibliography ==
- Assunta, M., Chapman, S., "A 'clean cigarette' for a clean nation: a case study of Salem Pianissimo in Japan", Tobacco Control 2004;13:ii58-ii62.
