= Richmond (cigarette) =

British cigarette brand

- Product type: Cigarette
- Current owner: Imperial Tobacco
- Produced by: Imperial Tobacco
- Country: United Kingdom
- Introduced: 1968; 58 years ago, re-introduced in 1999; 27 years ago
- Discontinued: Early 1970s
- Markets: See Markets

Richmond is a British brand of cigarettes, currently owned and manufactured by Imperial Tobacco.

== History ==
Richmond cigarettes were produced briefly in Canada by Imperial Tobacco, which introduced the brand in 1968 as a filtered kingsize. It was Imperial's first and only brand which used the Strickman Filter, an early high-filtration filter tip which was thought to reduce particulate matter in the smoke more effectively than the standard cellulose-acetate filter tip. These claims were later disproved, and the brand was withdrawn by the early 1970s.

Richmond was re-introduced into UK markets in 1999 as a value brand. The brand is in competition at the lower end of the market, against value UK cigarette brands such as Mayfair, Sovereign and Park Road.

== Markets ==
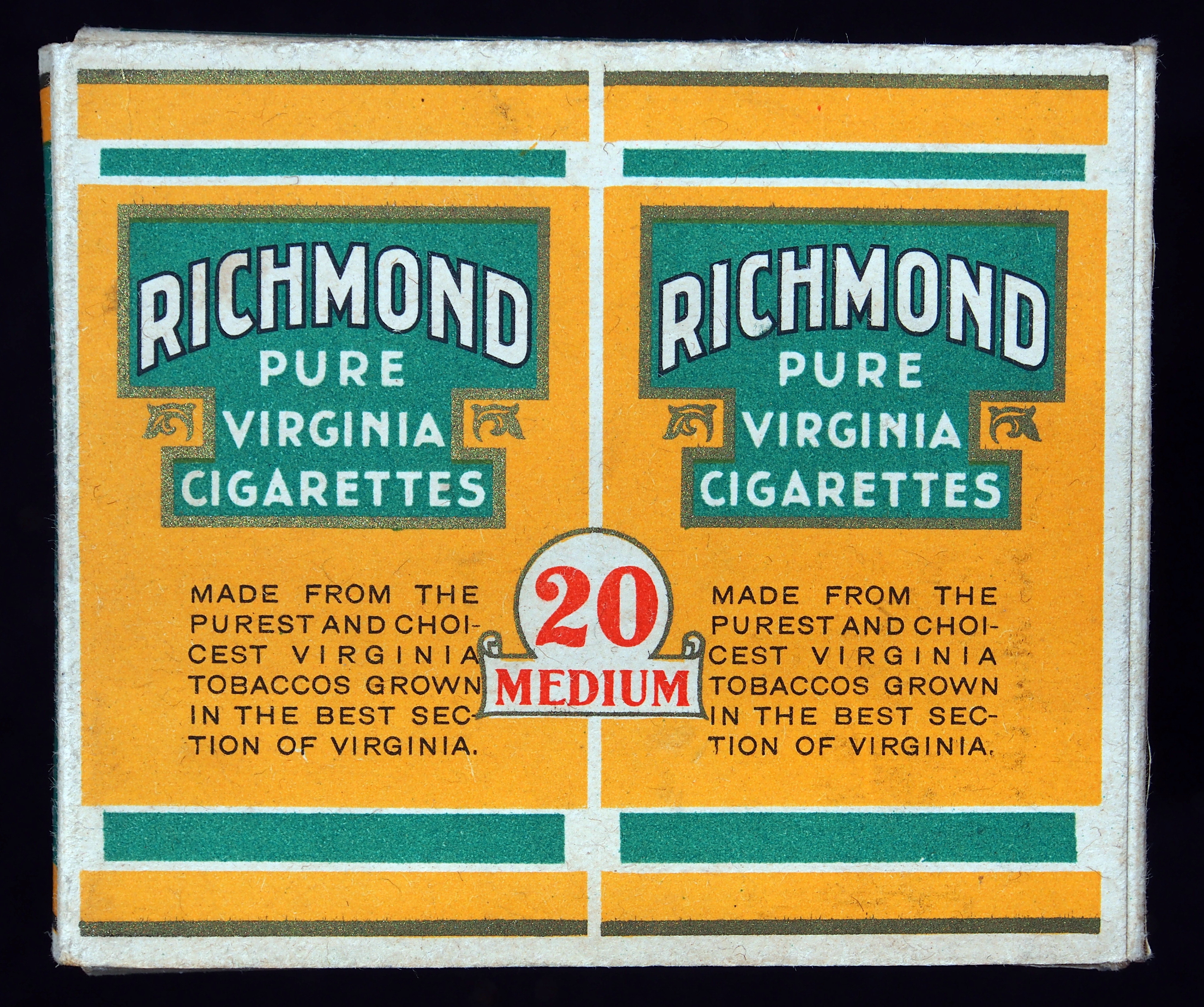
Packs of Richmond cigarettes

Richmond are mainly sold in the United Kingdom, but also were or still are sold in Luxembourg, Belgium, Finland, Belarus, Russia, Kazakhstan, Canada, Aruba, Curaçao, Bolivia, Paraguay, Uruguay and Argentina.

== Products ==
Richmond's variants Superkings and King Size are the fourth and fifth top-selling brand of cigarettes in the UK respectively. They were characterised by the bright blue packaging, which in early 2006 underwent a redesign: the serif font used being replaced for a more modern sans-serif, and general appearance becoming more minimalist. However, since 20 May 2016, none of these colours have been manufactured on the packets due to plain tobacco packaging laws coming into force, excepting the Channel Islands, as of 31 July 2022; along with a local ban on menthol cigarettes.

In 2008, new limited edition packs of Richmond cigarettes were released under the name "Chill Edition". In 2011, Richmond cigarette packaging across the brand varieties was updated, with the introduction of tactile feedback packaging experimented with in the 2008 Chill Edition packaging.

In August 2011, the Richmond brand introduced a new variant. 'Richmond Superslims' follow in the wider introduction to the UK tobacco products market of 'demi-slim' cigarettes, such as British American Tobacco's Vogue Perle brand.

They come in the following varieties: 1. Richmond Original King Size and Superkings. 2. Richmond Bright (Smooth) King Size and Superkings. 3. Richmond Green Filter King Size and Superkings (formerly Richmond Green Fusion)

== See also ==
- Tobacco smoking
