= Gareth Davis =

British businessman (born 1950)

- Born: May 1950 (age 76)
- Education: University of Sheffield
- Occupations: Chairman, M&C Saatchi Pod Point
- Known for: Former CEO, Imperial Tobacco (1996-2010)
- Board member of: M&C Saatchi, Gresham House, formerly Wolseley plc William Hill and DS Smith

Gareth Davis (born May 1950) is a British businessman.

Appointed by Lord Hanson, he was the CEO of Imperial Tobacco, the world's 4th largest international cigarette company, from 1996 until May 2010.

He served as the chairman of Wolseley plc (2003-2010), DS Smith (2010-2021), and William Hill (2010-2018).

Gareth joined the Board of M&C Saatchi in 2020 and became Non-Executive Chairman in 2021. He is on the Board of Gresham House Specialist Asset Management. He is Chairman of Pod Point Holdings.
