= Skruf Snus =

Swedish tobacco company

Skruf Snus AB
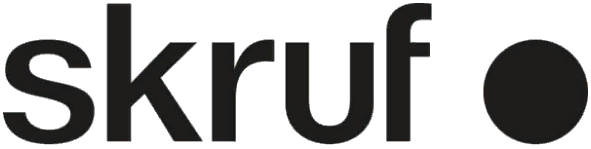
- Company type: Subsidiary
- Industry: Tobacco
- Founded: 2002; 23 years ago
- Headquarters: Sweden
- Products: Snus
- Parent: Imperial Brands
- Website: skruf.se

Skruf Snus AB is a Swedish manufacturer of snus. They were founded in 2002 and launched their first products in 2003.

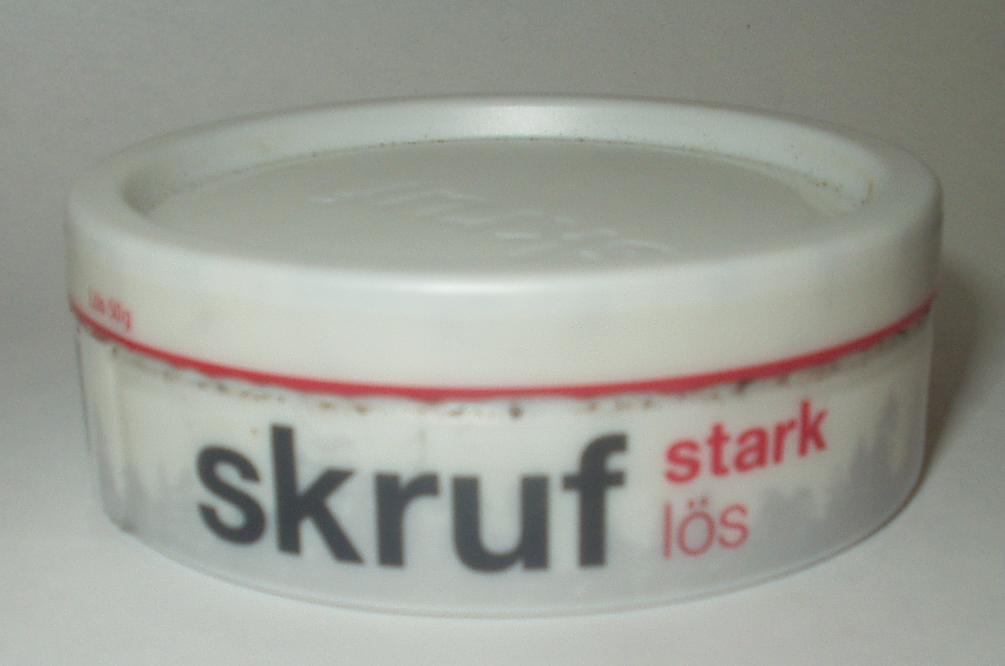
Skruf snus in its container

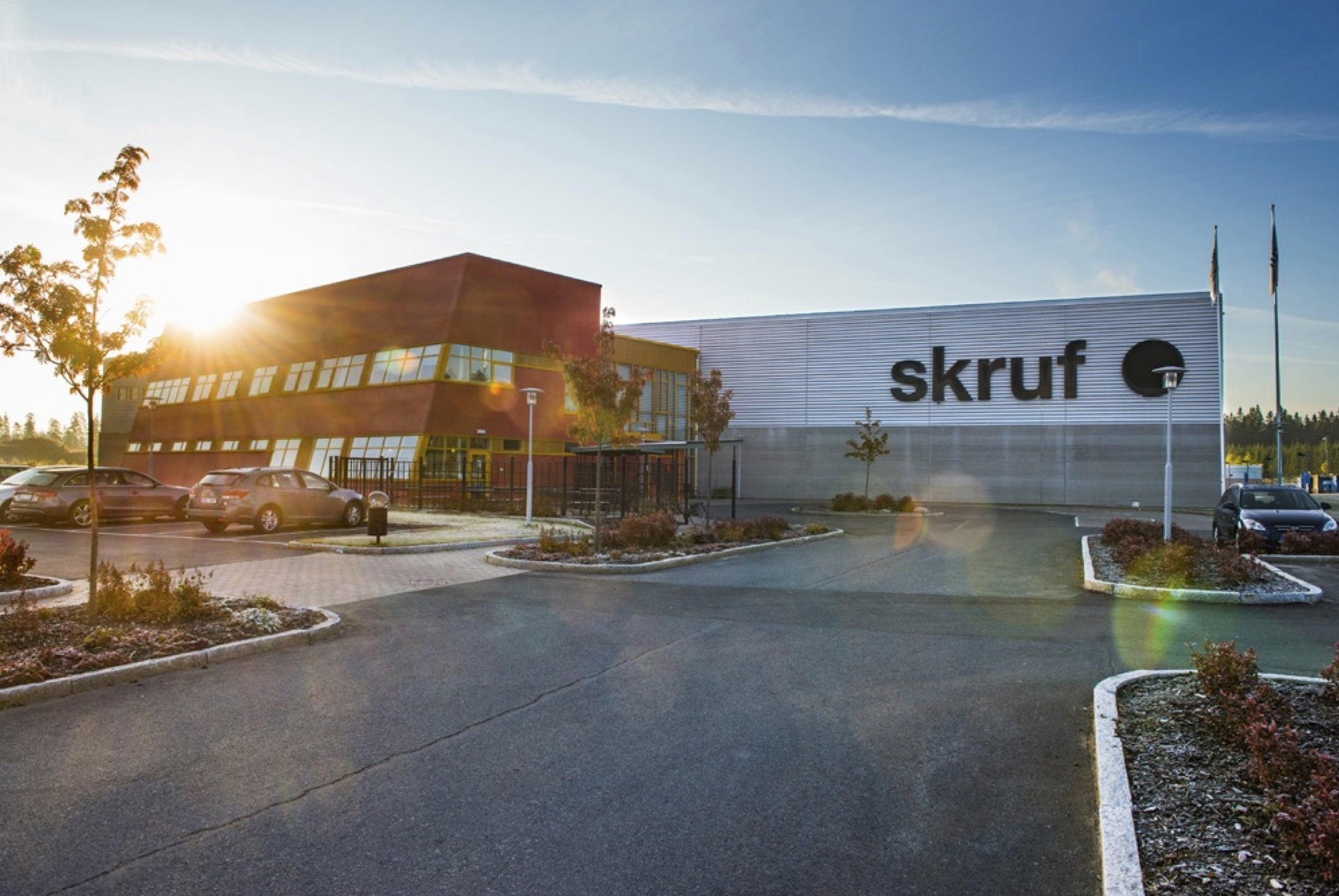
Skrufs production in Sävsjö

In 2005, Imperial Tobacco acquired 43.5% of the shares in Skruf Snus AB. ITG now owns Skruf Snus after having acquired the remaining shares in July 2008.

With Skruf as its leading brand, Imperial Tobacco had a 40% market share in Norway in 2017.
