= Mark Williamson (businessman) =

British businessman

- Born: Mark David Williamson; December 1957 (age 68)
- Occupations: Chairman, Imperial Brands
- Board member of: Imperial Brands; National Grid

Mark David Williamson (born December 1957) is a British businessman. He serves as the chairman of Imperial Brands.

Mark Williamson was born in December 1957.

Williamson "qualified as Chartered Accountant in South Africa in 1983." He was the chief financial officer of International Power from 2003 to 2012. He is the chairman of Imperial Brands, and a non-executive director of National Grid.
