= Snark sailboat =

Small, inexpensive, and lightweight sailboat

Snark
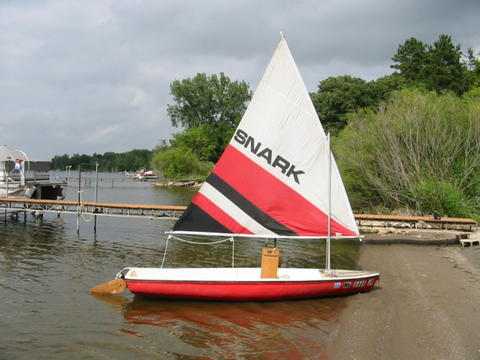

Boat
- Crew: 2

Hull
- Hull weight: 43 lb (20 kg)
- LOA: 11 ft (3.4 m)
- Beam: 3 ft 2 in (0.97 m)

Sails
- Mainsail area: 45 sq ft (4.2 m^{2})

The Snark is a line of lightweight sailboats, at its introduction a two-person, lateen-rigged sailboat manufactured and marketed by Meyers Boat Company of Adrian, Michigan.

The Snark was conceived and marketed by Snark Products, Inc. of Fort Lee, New Jersey and was marketed with numerous slight variations, most prominently as the Sea Snark, Super Snark and Super Sea Snark. Other Snark models include the Sunchaser (4-person, made in lateen and sloop-rigged versions), and the Sea Skimmer (board-style 2-person sloop-rigged). Among discontinued Snark models are the Triumph trimaran, the Mach I, the Sundancer and the Sea Swinger.

Meyers suspended production of all models in about 2018 and as of 2023 there has been no resumption.

The sailboat was marketed heavily in numerous co-branding campaigns. The New York Times reported that the Sea Snark outsold all other sailboats in 1970 and that over 48,000 Sea Snarks were sold in an 18-month period in 1971 via a mail order campaign with Kool Cigarettes. By 1973, over 200,000 Sea Snarks had been sold and The New York Times reported that by 1976 that Snark had built more sailboats than any other manufacturer. The manufacturer currently estimates that nearly a half million Sea Snarks have been manufactured since 1958.

Noted for its 11' expanded polystyrene hull and marketed as "unsinkable", a 1971 Popular Science reviewer doubted there was a sailboat "more foolproof". Originally, the purchase of a Sea Snark included a 16-page booklet on "how to sail", and a 1975 Popular Science article described the Sea Snark as the least expensive and lightest sailboat on the market.

== Design ==
Early Sea Snarks featured an unclad one-piece injection-molded EPS hull and the hull weighed approximately 30 lbs. Later versions, marketed s the Sunflower, Super Snark and Super Sea Snark featured a vacuum formed layer of ABS (later ASA) bonded over the EPS hull for a hull weight of 43 lbs. Snark Products patented the cladding process, which eliminated the possibility of voids within the injection molded hull. Snark Products Inc. marketed the cladding as Corelite, calling it "stronger than fiberglass." It was subsequently trademarked as Armorclad.

Sea Snarks have a monohull length of eleven feet; beam of thirty-eight inches; draft of 2 inches (unladen); and weight capacity of 310 lb. Features include a lateen-rigged nylon sail of 45 square feet; aluminum mast, top spar, and boom; wood rudder and an integral center sleeve molded into the hull to support a removable wood dagger board. With an overall depth of 12 inches, the sailboat can be stored upright in a depth of 12 inches, and the boat is marketed as "car-toppable". The boat arrives as a knock down kit in a cardboard box. Assembly requires approximately one hour.

In 1974 a slightly higher-priced version of the Super/Sea Snark was created, marketed as the Sunflower', featuring yellow ABS cladding as well as a covered foredeck (or "splash deck"). The 1974 Sunflower hull has the same dimensions as the Super Snark, as did its sail. In the 1980s, the Sunflower 3.3. was created. The 3.3. had a wider hull by two inches and sides two inches higher than that of the Super/Sea Snark. The Sunflower 3.3 mast was 12 inches taller and the gaff (top spar) was 28 inches longer but the boom length remained the same as that of the Super/Sea Snark and original Sunflower, resulting in a Sunflower 3.3 sail area 23% greater than that of the Super/Sea Snark and original Sunflower. Sunflowers were North American Yacht Racing Union (NAYRU) class certified and a Sunflower was displayed along with other American recreational equipment in a 1974 U.S. Information Agency exhibit touring Russia. Sales of this boat have been significantly less than the Super/Sea Snark.

== History ==
1973 Advertisement featuring the Snark sailboat, as a giveaway and co-branding promotion with Budweiser

Snark Products Inc. was co-founded by Jim McMullen in Fort Lee, New Jersey. For the sailboat's primary construction, Snark outsourced the EPS injection molding to a company in Connecticut; later expanding to its first production facility in Port Clinton, Ohio on Lake Erie in order to bring the work in-house. McMullen would later conceive successful marketing tie-ins for the sailboat, including the award-winning Kool cigarettes campaign.

Snark Products marketed the boats to Montgomery Ward and Sears (as the Whirlwind,) the latter becoming the company's largest client, as well as to hundreds of dealers across North America and internationally to licensed dealers in Japan, Germany, the United Kingdom, and Canada. Snark Products Inc. provided licensees with manufacturing molds and marketing materials.

In 1972, McMullen sold Snark Products to Doyle Dane Bernbach (now DDB Worldwide), the world's third-largest advertising agency, keeping a two-year management tenure. DDB subsequently sold the company to San Francisco-based Kransco. Boat manufacture moved between several locations, including Virginia Beach. In 1984, Lockley purchased Snark from Kransco, merging the two companies, to be subsequently purchased by Entwistle of Hudson, Massachusetts. Entwistle manufactured the boats in New Castle, Pennsylvania. In 1996, Snark was purchased by the Meyers Boat Company and production moved to Adrian, Michigan.

The Super/Sea Snark did not have an official class association until 2014 when the Super Sea Snark Sailing Association was started in the hopes of bringing Super/Sea Snark sailors together. This organization also established the official class rules. In 1993 the United States Sailing Association established the Portsmouth Rating (also known as the Portsmouth Yardstick (PY) or Portsmouth handicap scheme) for those racing the Snark against non-Snark sailboats.

== Marketing ==
The "unclad" Sea Snark retailed for $119. The Super/Sea Snark with its yellow ABS cladding was marketed at Sears in the late sixties and early seventies for $199. A 1971 ad in Boating magazine called the Sunflower "the Volkswagen of Sailboats"

In 1971, Kool cigarettes initiated an advertising campaign where consumers could mail order a Snark with the Kool logo on the sail for $88 (later $99) along with one KOOL carton flap; delivery was included. These were early (non-ABS) versions and retailed at the time for $120. As one of KOOL's highest-scoring ads, the company received over 18,000 orders for Sea Snarks in 1971 and the campaign was repeated in 1972. The Snark/Kool campaign won a national POPI award (given by the Point of Purchase Institute) as the most creative and inventive ad of 1971. The KOOL Snark promotion was repeated in 1972, adding the option of credit card payment, and again in 1975 for $139.

The Snark was used as a promotional tie-in with numerous companies including Coca-Cola, Vicks and Budweiser. In 1968, the San Francisco Chronicle ran ads for Mail-a-way, offering Snark sailboats as a giveaway in a promotion of their Kodak film processing service.

Advertisement for the $88 Kool cigarettes Snark sailboat offer

1968 Advertisement featuring the Snark sailboat, as a giveaway (San Francisco Chronicle, June 6, 1968, comic section)
