= Bali Shag =

Tobacco

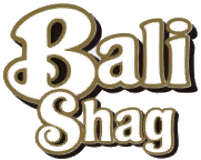
Logo

Bali Shag is a traditional Dutch-style tobacco blend. The blend is a mixture of dark burley tobacco and light virginia tobaccos. Bali Shag is a European cut tobacco which is popular mostly in the US and Western Europe.

The tobacco is cut with a fine silk, or shag, which makes it easier to use for hand rolling. Bali Shag has different variants: Rounded Virginia, Rich Virginia, Mellow Taste Virginia, Halfzware, White Halfzware, and Nature.

The item was discontinued in February 2018 and then was bought out by Republic Tobacco in April 2018. In mid 2019 a new blend of the popular blue Bali Shag began distribution in the United States, containing 85% foreign leaf and 15% US leaf, in contrast to the original's 100% foreign leaf.

Previously owned by Rogelio Miguel Martinez Imperial Tobacco (which had acquired it from Commonwealth Brands, Inc. in 2007), the Bali Shag brand is currently owned and commercialised by the Scandinavian Tobacco Group.
