= USA Gold =

American cigarette brand

- Current owner: ITG Brands, a subsidiary of Imperial Tobacco
- Country: United States
- Introduced: 1991; 35 years ago
- Previous owners: Commonwealth Brands; Houchens Industries
- Website: www.itgbrands.com/brands/

USA Gold is an American brand of discount cigarettes currently owned and manufactured by ITG Brands, a subsidiary of Imperial Tobacco. USA Gold brands were founded by Commonwealth Brands in 1991. Until previous year, Imperial had steered clear of the U.S. market for fear of being embroiled in litigation brought against tobacco companies. With a number of rulings going in favor of U.S. tobacco companies in that past year, that litigation risk appears to have faded.

== History ==
In 1991, Brad M. Kelley started Commonwealth Brands in Bowling Green, Kentucky. The goal was to undercut major cigarette companies by "producing discount 'branded generic' cigarettes". Kelley then sold Commonwealth Brands to Houchens Industries in 2001 for $1 billion, which at the time was the fifth-largest cigarette maker in the United States with a turnover of $800 million. USA Gold was the eighth best selling cigarette brand in the United States at the time.

In 2003, bargain brand cigarettes were selling cigarettes under names like "USA Gold and Roger". Deep-discount brands accounted for "10% of the U.S. market, up from 2% in 1997".

In 2007, British company Imperial Tobacco entered the United States discount cigarette market after purchasing the Commonwealth Brands for $1.9 billion. Through brands such as USA Gold and Sonoma, Commonwealth Brands controlled 3.7% of the U.S. cigarette market.

== Products ==
=== Varieties sold in the United States ===
As of 2017, all varieties of USA Gold sold by ITG Brands are only available in a box.

- USA Gold Red (Full Flavor) KS-20-H - USA
- USA Gold (Lights) KS-20-H - USA
- USA Gold (Menthol Lights) KS-20-S - USA
- USA Gold (Non-Filter) KS-20-S - USA
- USA Gold (Ultra Lights) KS-20-S - USA

== See also ==
- Tobacco smoking
