= Stefan Bomhard =

German businessman

- Born: May 1967
- Education: Middlesex University; Reutlingen University; University of Bradford
- Occupation: Businessman
- Title: Former CEO, Imperial Brands
- Term: July 2020-October 2025
- Predecessor: Alison Cooper

Stefan Bomhard (born May 1967) is a German businessman. He was the chief executive officer (CEO) of Imperial Brands from July 2020 to October 2025.

== Education ==
Bomhard earned a bachelor's degree from Middlesex University, a master's degree from Reutlingen University, and a doctorate in marketing from the University of Bradford.

== Career ==
Bomhard was appointed CEO of Inchcape plc in 2015, having been president of Bacardi's European region. He was chief commercial officer of Cadbury, having been chief operating officer of Unilever Food Solutions Europe, and before that held management and sales and marketing roles at Diageo (Burger King) and Procter & Gamble.

In February 2020, it was announced that Bomhard, who was CEO of Inchcape plc, would become the next CEO of Imperial Brands. He succeeded Alison Cooper in July 2020.

In May 2025, it was announced that Bomhard would retire from Imperial Brands, effective October 2025.
