= Bastos (cigarette) =

Spanish cigarette brand

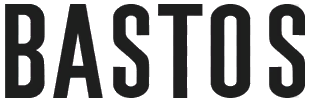
- Product type: Cigarette
- Current owner: Imperial Tobacco
- Country: Kingdom of Spain
- Introduced: 1830s
- Markets: See Markets

Bastos is a Spanish brand of cigarettes currently owned and manufactured by Imperial Tobacco. It used to be owned by Altadis until it was taken over by Imperial Tobacco in 2008.

== History ==
Bastos was founded in the 1830s by the Spanish pioneer and businessman Juan Bastos (1817–1889). He was moved with his parents from his birthplace in Málaga to Oran in French Algeria the day after the French conquered the place. They were among the first Spaniards to live in Algeria at that time.

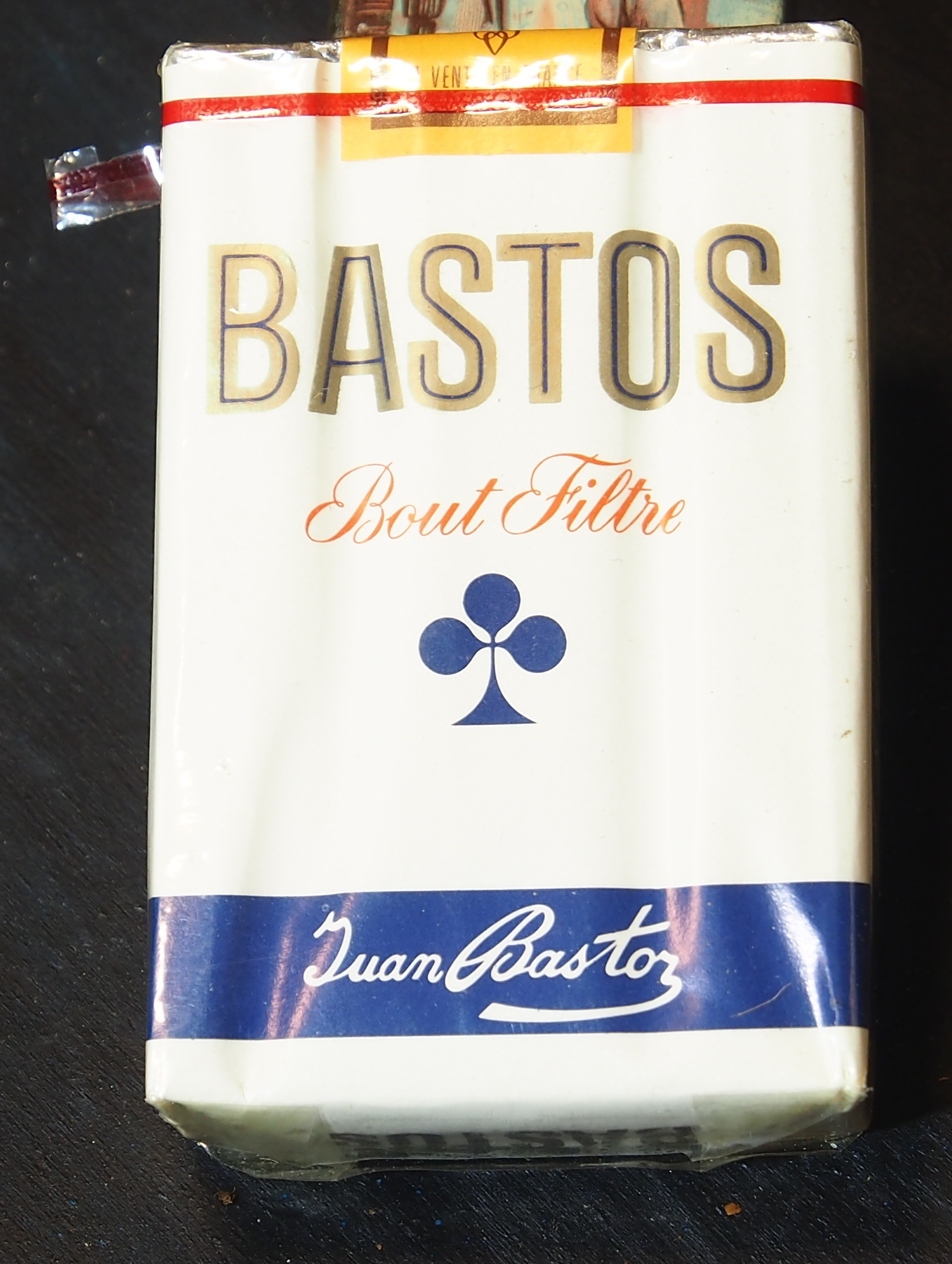
Old pack of Bastos cigarettes

Not long after, Juan opened a tobacco shop, just as it existed back in Spain, with the intent of providing the soldiers there with snuff. His first tobacco company was called "Cigars and Cigarettes J. Bastos", which was founded in 1838 as one of the first "industrial" establishments of the new colony.

After he died on 1 September 1889, his widow Francisca and his four children transformed the Tobacco Factory Juan Bastos into a partnership. Just before the start of the First World War, the Bastos company transformed into a Public limited company and was known as one of the first industrial enterprises in Algeria.

When Emmanuel (one of Juan's sons) died in 1920, the members of the family sold their shares, which were bought immediately by the Hoskier Bank. Eventually, a second bank, the Crédit Foncier de France would acquire almost all of the shares held by the Bastos family.

After World War II and the Algerian War, in which Algeria became independent, the Bastos house left the country and reestablished their tobacco company in metropolitan France as Société de Financement Industriel Commercial et Agricole (Sofical). It established subsidiaries in Cameroon, Louiseville (Canada), Dakar (Senegal), Switzerland and Saigon (Vietnam). Also, Sofical started a partnership with Job to form the Manufacture Corse des Tabacs Job-Bastos (MCTJB), a tobacco manufacturing plant in Corsica (France).

In 1986, Bastos owner Sofical was purchased by Bolloré. Also that year, the local Juan Bastos Tobacco Company in Cameroon was bought out by British American Tobacco after the company could not compete in the region anymore.

Bolloré sold its cigarette subsidiary to Imperial Tobacco over three stages from 2001 to 2004.

== Sponsorship ==
In Grand Prix motorcycle racing, Bastos sponsored the Cagiva factory team during the 1986 and 1987 seasons.

In the 1980s to the 1990s, Bastos sponsored Belgian, Dutch and French drivers including Marc Duez, Bruno Thiry, Patrick Snijers, Thierry Tassin, Eric van de Poele, Peter Kox, Jean-Michel Martin, Eddy Joosen, Bernard Béguin, Claude Bourgoignie and François Chatriot. The brand won the Spa 24 Hours (nine times), Zolder 24 Hours, Ypres Rally (four times) and French Rally Championship.

== Markets ==
Bastos was or still is sold in the following countries: Netherlands, West Germany, Belgium, Luxembourg, France, Switzerland, Spain, Hungary, Madagascar, Laos and Vietnam.

== In popular culture ==
=== Novels ===
In Captain Conan, Lieutenant Norbert (the narrator of the novel) offers some Bastos cigarettes to a Dubreuil military priest in the year following the end of World War I. The priest refuses politely, saying, "These are the cigarettes for the choir children, Lieutenant." after which he fills his pipe with tobacco.

In the Italian film version of the novel "The Stranger" by Albert Camus, the hero Mersault sits on his balcony in the afternoon and observes a shopkeeper emerge from his store across the way to sit on a stool in the doorway. On the wall alongside him is prominently displayed an advertisement for Bastos cigarettes.

== See also ==
- Tobacco smoking
- Bastos racing team
