= Golden Virginia =

English hand-rolling tobacco brand

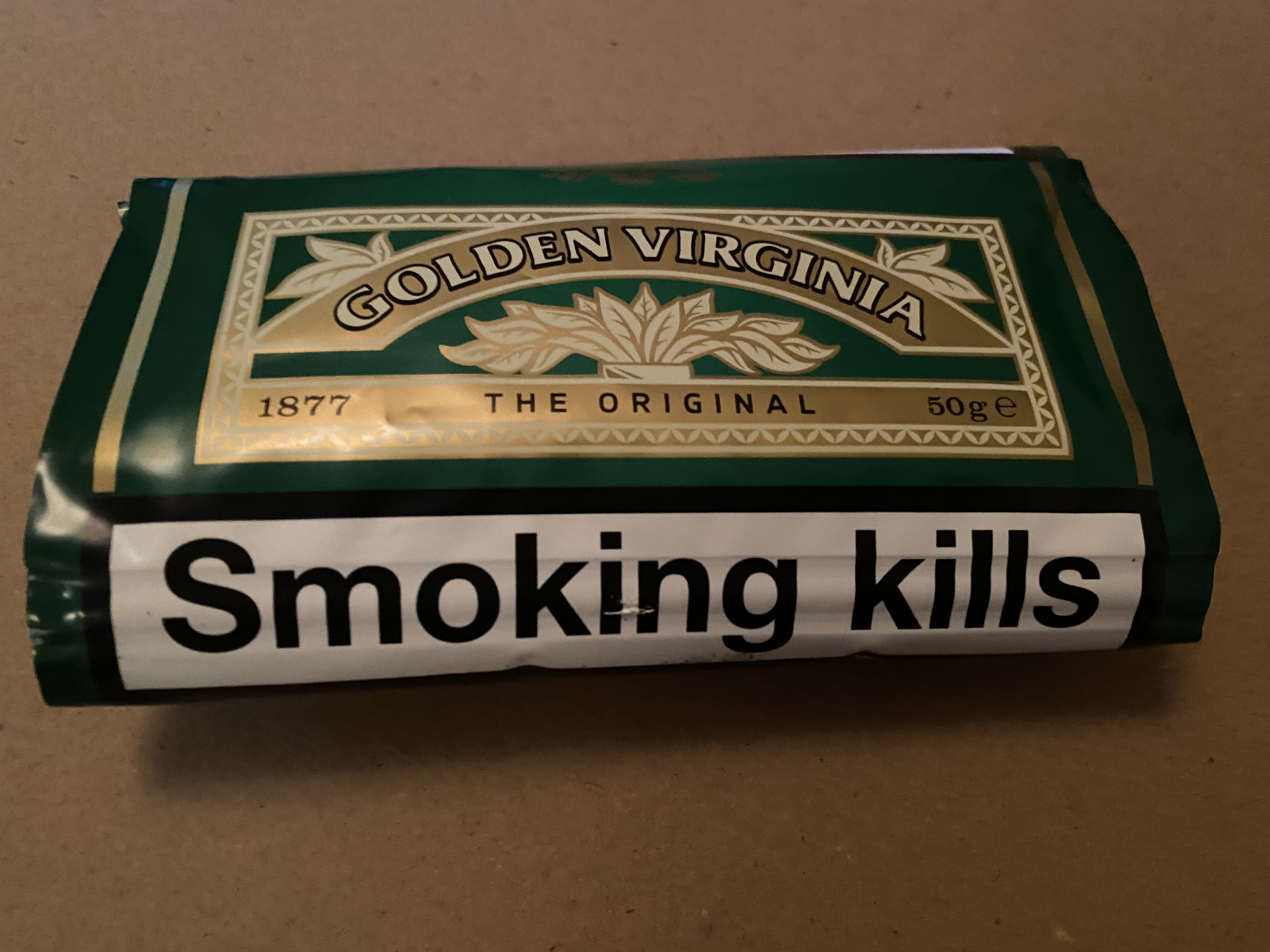
- A 50g pack of the original, sold in the UK in duty free in 2025 (note no plain packaging)
- Product type: Rolling tobacco
- Current owner: Imperial Tobacco
- Produced by: Imperial Tobacco; and also less commonly British American Tobacco
- Country: England
- Introduced: 1877; 149 years ago
- Markets: Europe

Golden Virginia is a hand-rolling tobacco brand manufactured and sold throughout Europe by Imperial Tobacco. It contains a combination of fine-cut Virginia, burley, and oriental tobaccos. Golden Virginia first appeared in the United Kingdom in 1877, and it is currently sold in 30g and 50g pouches. In the UK, there are three predominant types sold: the original, yellow, and amber.

Golden Virginia is the third most popular rolling tobacco brand in the UK (As of November 2025). It is sold in over 35 markets, predominantly in Western Europe, with its key markets being the United Kingdom, Ireland, Belgium, Spain, and Luxembourg.

== Blend releases ==
=== Smooth blend ===
On 2 March 2009, Imperial Tobacco launched its new Golden Virginia Smooth blend onto the roll-your-own market. It was originally sold in 8g, 10g, 12.5g, 25g, and 50g pouches with distinctive, bright yellow branding and packaging which was a noticeable contrast to the Original blend's long-established green and gold packaging and design. It soon began outselling the parent Original brand due to the cheaper mid-pricing point and the range of smaller weights available. In 2012, the 'Handy Pack' was launched which was a regular-sized cigarette box containing a small, 8g pouch of tobacco, a 40-paper pack of Rizla, and 24 cigarette filters presented in four tubes of 6 filters.

From 20 May 2017, following an EU Tobacco Products Directive prohibiting the sale of low weights of hand-rolling tobacco (e.g. 8g, 12.5g, and 25g), it is now only sold in 30g and 50g pouches, with a slightly larger 30g Handy Pack launched in 2018.

Similarly, on 1 July 2017, another directive outlawed the use of branding, descriptions, and attractive colorization of packaging. Also banned was the use of descriptive words to describe the 'strength' of tobacco products, such as 'smooth', 'light', and 'menthol'. This meant that Imperial Tobacco had to begin phasing out the descriptive words on all their tobacco products. In Golden Virginia's case, 'Smooth' became 'Yellow', and, after the plain packaging was enforced, the name was changed again to 'G V Bright Yellow'.

As of April 2019, the name of the brand reverted to 'Golden Virginia Yellow', the name that was used prior to the introduction of plain packaging.

=== Bright Sunrise / Midnight ===
On 3 July 2015, Golden Virginia launched two new blends to the range. Following a revision of brand names which saw Golden Virginia Original become 'G V Original' and Golden Virginia Yellow become 'G V Bright Yellow', the new products followed this naming convention and were called 'G V Bright Sunrise' and 'G V Bright Midnight'.

They were initially available in 10g, 12.5g, 25g, and 50g pouches until 20 May 2017, when following an EU Tobacco Product Directive, the sale of all hand-rolling tobacco was restricted to only 30g and 50g pouches only.

As of May 2019, both Golden Virginia Bright Sunrise and Bright Midnight have been discontinued.
