= Peter Stuyvesant (cigarette) =

Brand of cigarettes and Art Foundation

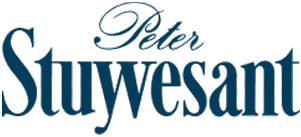
- Product type: Cigarette
- Current owner: Jermaine John
- Produced by: Colombian American Tobacco; British American Tobacco; Imperial Tobacco (Australia and New Zealand)
- Country: South Africa
- Introduced: 1954; 72 years ago
- Markets: See Markets
- Previous owners: Reemtsma (Germany only)
- Tagline: "The scent of the big wide world: Peter Stuyvesant.", "The taste of the whole wide world."

Peter Stuyvesant is a brand of cigarettes currently owned by British American Tobacco and manufactured by the American Cigarette Company. In Australia and New Zealand, the brand is manufactured by Imperial Tobacco. The cigarette brand is named after Petrus Stuyvesant, Director General of New Netherland, later New York State, New Jersey, Delaware and parts of surrounding states.

== History ==
The Peter Stuyvesant brand was initially launched in South Africa in 1954 and later test marketed in New York in 1957; the brand was officially launched worldwide in the same year and Peter Stuyvesant is sold in about 30 countries around the world. The original slogan for the brand was, "The scent of the big wide world: Peter Stuyvesant." This popular slogan was created in 1958 by Swiss graphic designer Fritz Bühler, and lasted until the 1980s, when it was changed to "The taste of the whole wide world." British American Tobacco bought the brand in 2003.

In the 1980s, the brand enjoyed an increase in sales due to various advertising campaigns in cinemas and by offering the cigarettes to passengers of the Dutch airline company, KLM. The brand is sold in 55 countries and is popular in South Africa, Australia and New Zealand, as well as most parts of Europe, but is less known in the United States.

== Peter Stuyvesant Foundation ==
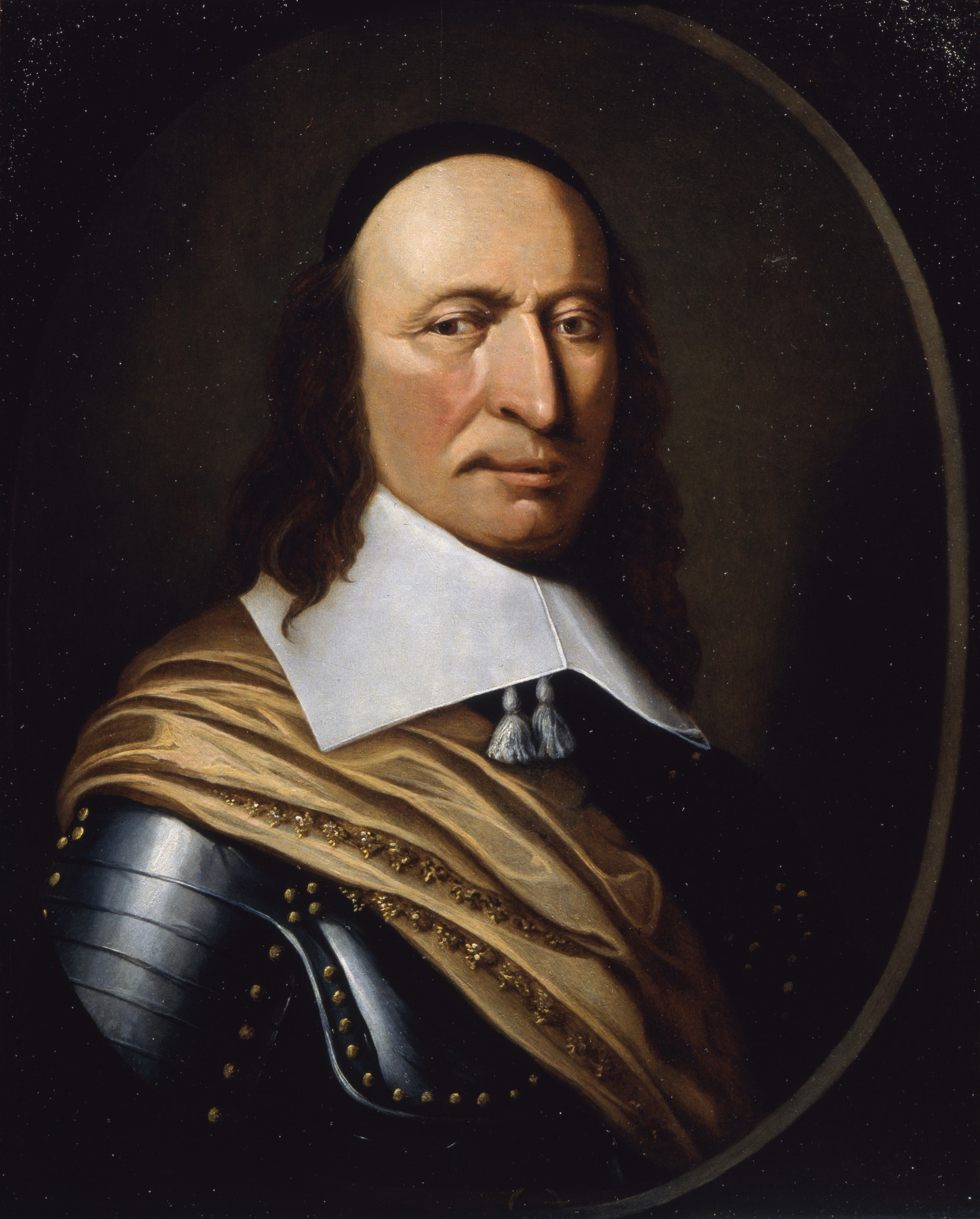
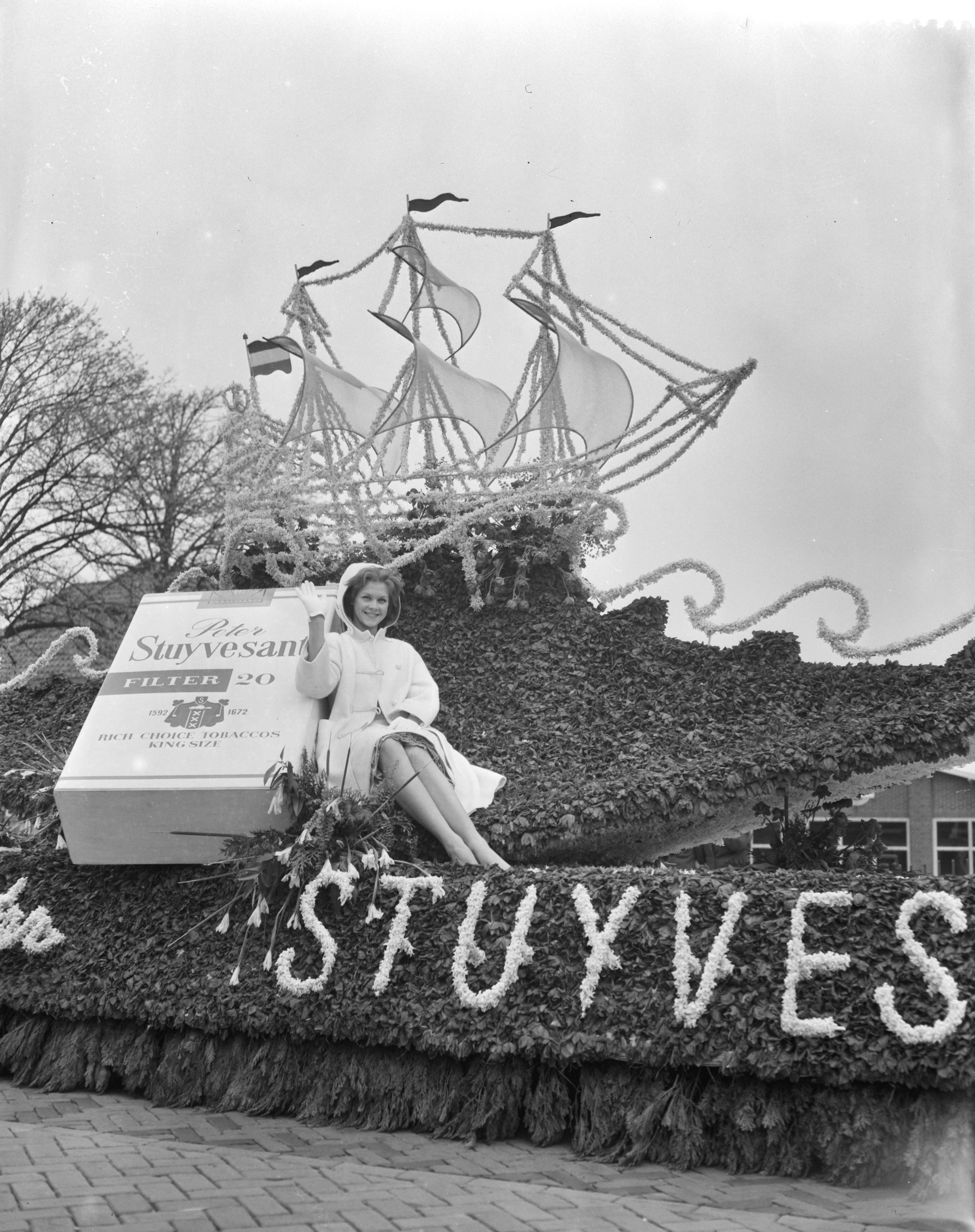
(Left): Portrait of Peter Stuyvesant, the last Dutch director-general of the colony of New Netherland, from whom the brand took its name; (right): advertisement of Stuyvesant cigarettes at the 1959 Bloemencorso Bollenstreek

The Peter Stuyvesant Foundation was established in 1965 and has played a role in public policy and arts proposals, one of which was the City Sculpture Project in the United Kingdom. This project, directed by the Arts Council of Great Britain, commissioned sculptures which were displayed across eight different cities in the UK, the funding for which was provided by the Peter Stuyvesant Foundation in an attempt to create publicity and engagement with the corporation. The sculptures were envisioned to be new and made specifically for their locations, and after their stint of six months in the city-centres, were to be auctioned off to ‘city councils, industrial and commercial organisations or private citizens’, though none of them became permanent fixtures and multiple were vandalised or destroyed.

=== Peter Stuyvesant Collection ===
The Peter Stuyvesant Collection began in 1960 and precedes the creation of the Peter Stuyvesant Foundation, though it is better thought of as a predecessor. Its inception came after an attempt was made at the Turmac cigarette factory in Zevenaar, an eastern village in the Netherlands, to raise worker morale and increase worker productivity by hanging large scale paintings over the heads of employees, from the ceiling of the factory floor. Actually, the initiative was not taken by the company or its director, Alexander Orlow, but it was proposed by two semi-state organizations that intended to promote modern art and culture in the service of peace, the Fondation Européenne de la Culture and the Nationale Kunststichting. They commissioned thirteen painters from thirteen European countries to visualise the concept 'joie de vivre', and these were hung in the production plant in Zevenaar.

When this 'experiment' proved to be a success, Orlow asked the then director of the Stedelijk Museum in Amsterdam to act as advisor for the expansion of the collection, which led to a rapid growth. These works regularly circulated between the Amsterdam headquarters and the various factories around the world, in Spain, France, Italy and Switzerland. They were also shown in museums in the Netherlands and abroad. In time, this innovation became quite beloved and, as such, was broadened from the original thirteen artworks to include many more, expanding as well to the corporate offices of Turmac in Amsterdam. The collection was named after the company’s production of Peter Stuyvesant cigarettes before its merger with liquor and cigarette company Rothmans, and then its subsequent takeover by British American Tobacco in 2000. In 2008, Rothmans decided to sell the collection.

Starting in 1980, the Foundation offered the workers of the tobacco factory the opportunity to acquire original works in a limited edition of 100 copies. In 2010, the collection was dispersed via four auction installments.

The origin of this collection and its original thirteen artworks were found to have been donated by the secretary general of the Dutch Ministry of Arts, Education and Sciences, in pursuit of cultural policies to inspire ‘cultural competence’ in the working classes. The semi-governmental approach to promoting an artistic following in less wealthy parts of Dutch society seems to have taken influence from Germany in the 1930s and has been said to influence a similar approach to corporate art collections in Canada from the 1920s onwards. Additionally, high profile public artists and other popular figures were consulted for the curation of the art collection. Notably, Willem Sandberg was consulted, which led to some avant-garde artworks making their way into the collection. Because of its nature in hanging in a production factory, the requirements for acquiring works of art for the collection were fairly stringent. The curators chose to hang only two-dimensional artworks, with a prerequisite that they were colourful and could be seen easily with recognisable images on a large-scale.

The collection is regarded by some to have morphed into an attempt at influencing positive corporate attention and to bolster the image of cigarette production companies. After its displays at multiple Dutch museums, the collection went on a tour to Australia, France, Belgium and Canada, where art shows were organised in tandem with other cigarette production companies similar to Turmac, who each belonged to the International Tobacco consortium. In Amsterdam, British American Tobacco opened its main offices in 1966, where part of the collection was showcased in a gallery opened alongside it. Upon its opening, press coverage was encouraged and there was an event which staged local artists and poets who performed in the name of the new gallery. After its merger with Rothmans, and then its subsequent takeover with BAT, the Stuyvesant collection was further expanded, being seen as a way to maintain public image surrounding Stuyvesant and the BAT brand.

The collection changed its name in 2002 to the ‘BAT Artventure collection’, due to new Dutch laws which outlawed the use of cigarette branding in any public-facing venture which could stir up publicity or significant media attention. Though this did not stop the collection of artworks for a number of years. By the time it was decided that the collection would be auctioned, it was valued at three-times its original worth and what was spent on its acquisition. The sale of the collection exceeded expectations and was considered a massive success.

The Zevenaar factory office has been granted the status of National Monument being one example of the building style "Het Nieuwe Bouwen" of the interwar period. Since 2010 it's in use as the municipality hall of Zevenaar. One of the former production halls has been granted the status of Municipal Monument. Since 2015 it's in use as the Turmac Cultureel Centrum. The remaining buildings of the factory complex were demolished. On the terrain a new neighbourhood will arise, named "BAT" after the British American Tobacco Company, the last owner of the plant.

== Controversy ==
During the Atlanta Olympic games in 1996, Peter Stuyvesant was able to advertise their cigarettes during broadcasts of the Olympics in Malaysia, despite anti-smoking advertising regulations and the Olympic Committee’s own ‘smoke free’ broadcasting policies. The Consumer Association of Penang and the Asia-Pacific Broadcasting Union were outspoken advocates against Peter Stuyvesant’s right to broadcast to such a large audience in Malaysia. The regular rules against cigarette advertisements were able to be circumvented by Peter Stuyvesant as they advertised under the scope of their associated travel agency, which has the same name.

In 2009, Imperial Tobacco Australia hosted a VIP party in a building owned by the South Australian state government, which funds anti-smoking campaigns, to promote its Peter Stuyvesant brand. The annual Peter Stuyvesant secret VIP party had become a legend among A-listers. Supposedly held in a different city every year, the party was labelled as one of the biggest and most lavish on the corporate calendar. The top-secret, invitation-only event was held in the Queen's Theatre, a non-smoking venue belonging to the History Trust of South Australia.

Senator Nick Xenophon described the cigarette industry as "parasitic" and urged the government to cancel the event, but the state Substance Abuse Minister Jane Lomax-Smith said she would not "interfere" with the party. "While we are making life tougher for cigarette companies, we wouldn't interfere in the affairs of a legitimate business running a private function in a no-smoking venue," she said.

In 2016, it was reported that Imperial Tobacco Australia was selling cut-price premium brand cigarettes imported from Ukraine in various Coles, IGA and Foodworks stores for as low as 20 Australian Dollars a packet. Fairfax Media bought cigarettes from Imperial Tobacco's line of brands that were from two countries of origin - New Zealand and Ukraine. The Ukrainian-made Imperial Tobacco cigarettes were between $3 and $6 cheaper than the company's cigarettes made in New Zealand, depending on the brand and the location of the store. The brand at the centre of the change was the popular, premium brand, Peter Stuyvesant Blues. The Ukrainian version was called "Peter Stuyvesant Originals Blue", while the NZ version was dubbed "Peter Stuyvesant Classic Blue". A spokeswoman for Imperial Tobacco claimed the company had changed its country of import to provide cut-price cigarettes to the Australian market. "The Ukraine-manufactured product is a brand extension. Our Ukrainian facility has the machinery necessary to manufacture this particular product. The balance of that brand family is manufactured in NZ," she said.

=== Clashes with plain packaging laws ===
In 2016, Imperial Tobacco Australia employed a marketing tactic in an attempt to circumvent new Australian plain packaging legislation. By inserting soft packs inside hard packs, the cigarette company effectively allowed people to take the cigarettes out with the soft pack and throw away the hard pack which featured the required graphic pictorial warnings. This tactic was mainly used for Peter Stuyvesant cigarette packs. A spokeswoman for Imperial Tobacco denied the company was breaking the law before adding: "we are providing a fresher, premium product to consumers".

In 2017, the Australian Health Department conceded it would not be taking any action against Imperial Tobacco for breaching plain packaging legislation. Court action under the plain packaging legislation could involve penalties of more than a million dollars imposed on the tobacco giant, but the Department chose to take what it called a "conciliatory" approach.

A report in 2011 by Quit Victoria mentioned Peter Stuyvesant's previous behaviour, noting: "In February 2006, one month prior to the adoption of picture‐based warnings on tobacco packages, Peter Stuyvesant cigarettes were being sold in 'trendy retro‐style tins' which, unlike soft packets of cigarettes with on‐pack printed warnings, had health warning stickers that were easily peeled off. Retailers reported that the tins were very popular with younger smokers".

Additionally, The cigarette brand released a limited-edition cigarette packaging which depicted the original Peter Stuyvesant design, but with its cover stripped away slightly, revealing the proposed new plain packaging design, a standardised font with an unappetising green colour, aimed at neutralising brand perception.Then health minister for Australia, Tanya Plibersek called this marketing campaign a ‘sick joke’ and responded, saying “diseased lungs, hearts and arteries and the reality of what is happening on the inside to a smoker,” referring to the new Peter Stuyvesant tagline. This was accompanied by the tag-line “It’s what’s on the inside that counts”. This would go on to create an increased interest in Peter Stuyvesant cigarettes.

== Marketing ==
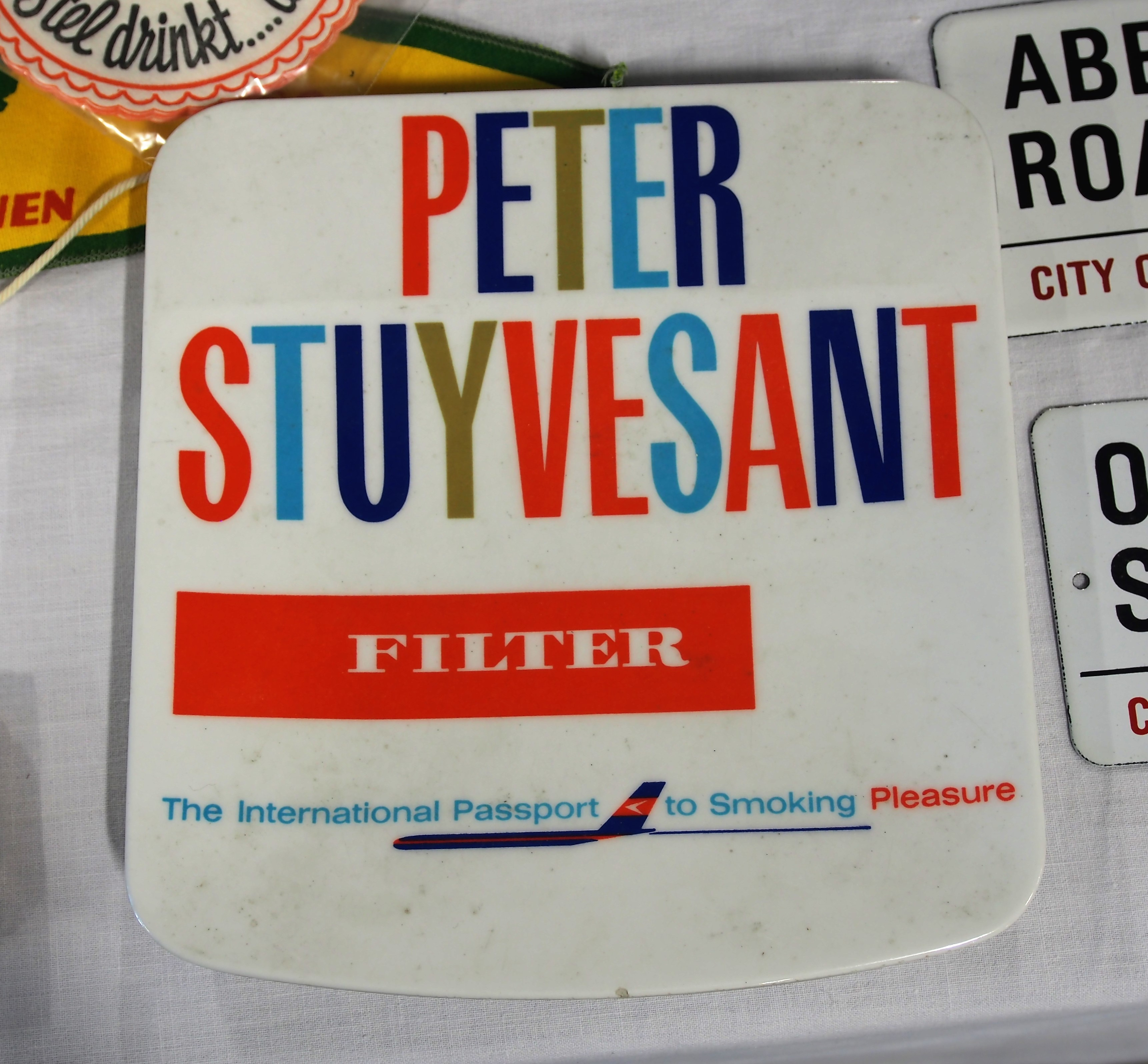
A Peter Stuyvesant branded coaster

Peter Stuyvesant continues to market similarly to most other British American Tobacco products. This usually connotes an emphasis on modern design, favouring metallic colouring, rounded cornering and larger font to encourage a revival in younger markets. Additionally, innovations in packaging designs are often used to grow brand loyalty. This includes packets that open sideways, packets whose lids have hinges and click into place and numerous filter flavouring and layering techniques such as "Mintek", a menthol filter, and "3Tek", a charcoal filter. Other marketing strategies attempt to convince the consumer that they are purchasing a cigarette with a high value for money. This means selling cigarettes as 'king-sized' or larger than normal, or rather selling smaller numbers of cigarettes in a packet, like twelve rather than twenty. Peter Stuyvesant specifically has been known to use a 'reinforced... Freshness Seal to further improve awareness of that feature among consumers.'

However, with the advent of plain packaging laws in Australia and an uptick in interest amongst other governments around the world, marketing strategies are compelled to change. Previously possible designs and styles were very quickly made redundant in parts of the world with these laws.

In response to the Australian plain packaging laws, Peter Stuyvesant’s branding changed in order to compensate for new challenges in marketing. Colour-coded cigarette products were created with the aim of lessening the perceived danger of smoking and providing a visual indicator for flavour, strength and aesthetic. However, with plain packaging in effect, the colour branding became more obsolete and new innovations in cigarette branding were relied on. Name variants were used extensively in cigarette branding. In cigarette brands such as Peter Stuyvesant, flashy naming can also be seen as a premium option, allowing an increased pricing option and a perceived taste difference on behalf of consumers. The use of words such as ‘classic’, ‘optimum’ and ‘premium’ are examples of this. Specific to Peter Stuyvesant was a new label named “Pop Refreshing Crushball” which aimed to create more inviting and friendly language. The eventual goal was to downplay the impact of smoking for younger consumers.

Peter Stuyvesant also employed the use of both soft and hard packaging immediately after the legislation was implemented, though this has since changed and packaging has become standardized under Australian plain packaging laws. In other branding decisions, BAT has preferred to use pull-out tabs, rounded packaging, wallet-type and metallic packaging in order to communicate innovation and modernity. The use of colour-name variants in cigarette branding was initially refused by Peter Stuyvesant, with pure name variants being preferred, often referring to quality, though this also was amended.

== Markets ==
French pack of Peter Stuyvesant cigarettes

Peter Stuyvesant is or was sold in the following countries: Canada, United States, United Kingdom, Lebanon, Luxembourg, Belgium, The Netherlands, Germany, France, Austria, Switzerland, Spain, Portugal, Italy, Czech Republic, Greece, Turkey, Senegal, Zambia, South Africa, Malaysia, Australia and New Zealand.

Australia's plain packaging laws lead to a significant decrease in the amount of variants sold and marketed in Australian supermarkets. Only three variants of Peter Stuyvesant were sold, as opposed to other premium branded cigarettes such as Marlboro, Dunhill and Winfield, which listed upwards of ten variants sold across Australia

Between 27 March and 17 August 2020, all tobacco and vape products were outlawed from sale in South Africa, as part of the country's COVID-19 lock down protocol. During this time, Peter Stuyvesant and other brands of premium cigarettes were difficult to find in surrounding countries, most notably Namibia. Usually a large exporter of cigarette products, South Africa was losing large portions of its export to these countries, having it seemingly go missing. This is speculated to have been from theft and smuggling, as people attempted to fuel the black market for cigarettes in South Africa by bringing stolen tobacco goods back over the South African border to tend to increasing demand. A large reason why the smoking ban was considered irrational and short-sighted comes from its inability to assess the demand-side conditions in South Africa previous to the ban.

== Products ==
- Peter Stuyvesant Red: (tar: 12 mg; nicotine: 1.2 mg; carbon monoxide: 10 mg)
- Peter Stuyvesant Gold: (tar: 6 mg; nicotine: 0.5 mg; carbon monoxide: 6 mg)
- Peter Stuyvesant Gold 100s: (tar: 6 mg; nicotine: 0.5 mg; carbon monoxide: 6 mg)
- Peter Stuyvesant Blue: (tar: 4 mg; nicotine: 0.3 mg; carbon monoxide: 5 mg)
- Peter Stuyvesant Silver: (tar: 1 mg; nicotine: 0.1 mg; carbon monoxide: 2 mg)
- Peter Stuyvesant Blue (South Africa): (tar: 9 mg; nicotine: 0.8 mg; carbon monoxide: ? mg)

== See also ==
- Tobacco smoking
- Peter Stuyvesant
