= Imperial Brands =

British tobacco company

Imperial Brands plc.

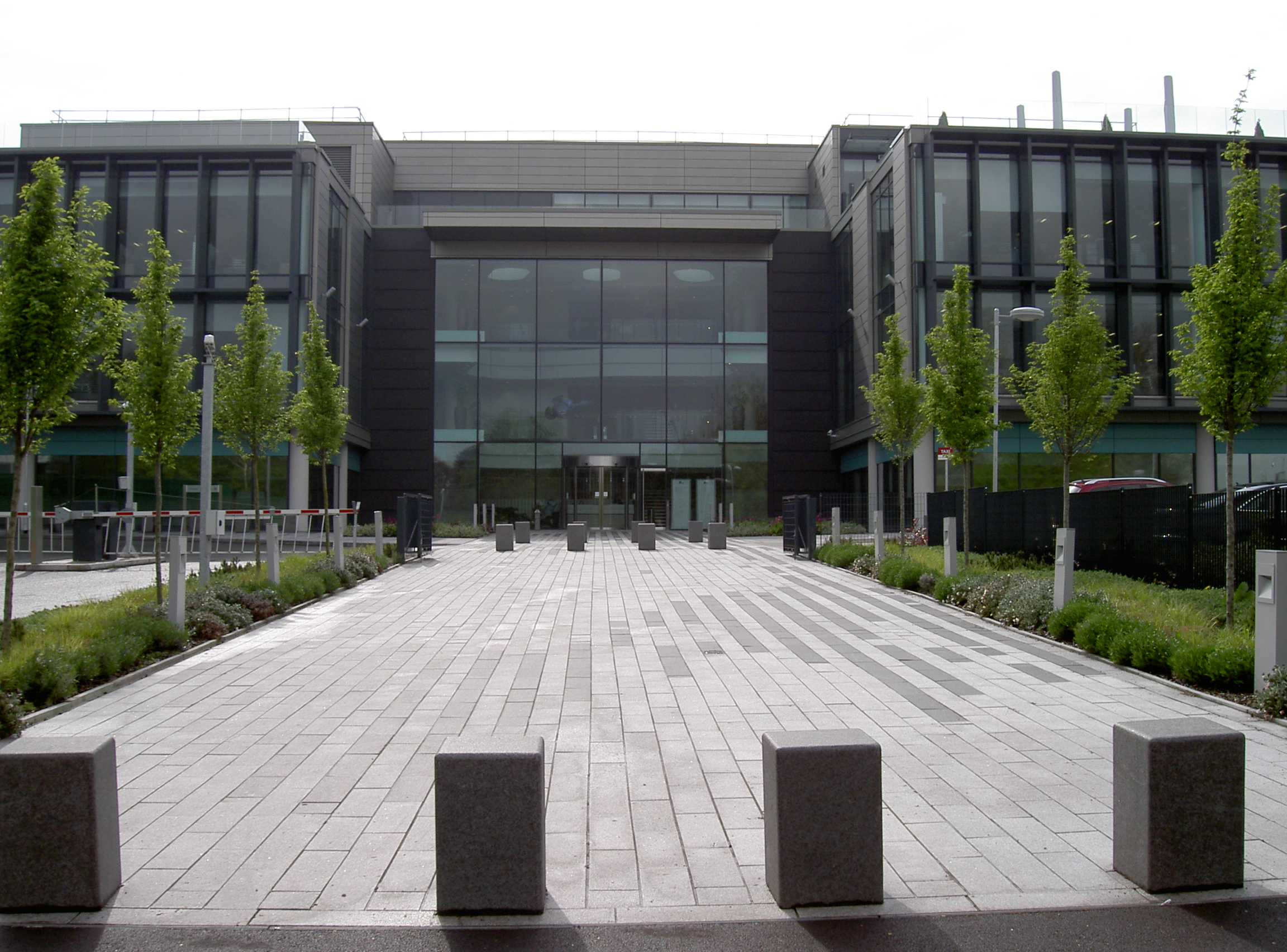
- Imperial Brands offices in Bristol, April 2014
- Trade name: Imperial Tobacco
- Formerly: Imperial Tobacco Company of Great Britain & Ireland (1901–1996); Imperial Tobacco Group plc. (1996–2016)
- Type: Public
- Traded as: LSE: IMB; FTSE 100 Component
- Industry: Tobacco
- Predecessor: W.D. & H.O. Wills
- Founded: 1901; 125 years ago
- Headquarters: Bristol, England
- Area served: Worldwide
- Key people: List: Mark Williamson (Chairperson); Alison Cooper (CEO); Sir William Henry Wills, Bt. (first Chairman); Sir George Alfred Wills, Bt. (former President); The 1st Baron Dulverton (former President)
- Products: Cigarettes; cigars; fine-cut rolling tobacco; rolling papers and tubes; snus; vapes; heated tobacco; oral nicotine
- Revenue: ▼£31.677 billion (2026)
- Operating income: ▼£3.134 billion (2026)
- Net income: ▼£2.048 billion (2026)
- Number of employees: 25,100 (2026)
- Subsidiaries: Fontem Ventures; Imperial Tobacco; ITG Brands; Altadis; Logista
- Website: imperialbrandsplc.com

Imperial Brands plc., still commonly known by its former name (and now trade name) Imperial Tobacco, (Note: Name used on tobacco products, such as cigarettes and rolling tobacco. The trade name is not used on non-tobacco products (other nicotine products, such as vaping or nicotine pouches), where the official name "Imperial Brands" is used.) is a British multinational tobacco company headquartered in Bristol, England. It is the world's largest producer of fine-cut tobacco and tobacco papers. Imperial Brands is listed on the London Stock Exchange and is a constituent of the FTSE 100 Index.

Imperial Brands has 30 factories worldwide and its products are sold in around 120 countries. Its tobacco brands include Davidoff, West, Golden Virginia, Drum and Rizla. Imperial Brands's alternative nicotine products include the blu brand of electronic cigarettes, the Pulze and iD brands of heated tobacco systems, and the Zone X and Skruf brands of nicotine pouches.

Imperial Tobacco Canada is the Canadian subsidiary of British American Tobacco, and has no relationship to Imperial Brands. Similarly, Imperial Tobacco Company of India (now known as ITC Limited) is a separate company and has no relationship to Imperial Brands.

== History ==
=== 1901 to 2000 ===
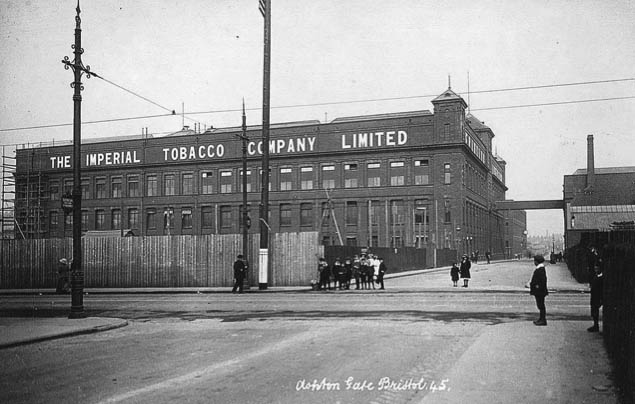
Imperial Tobacco building in Raleigh Road, Bristol, constructed in 1912

The Imperial Tobacco Company was created in 1901, in response to the price war in the British market promoted by James Buchanan Duke's American Tobacco Company. It amalgamated 13 British tobacco and cigarette companies: W.D. & H.O. Wills of Bristol (the leading manufacturer of tobacco products at that time), John Player & Sons of Nottingham, Stephen Mitchell & Son of Glasgow, and 10 other independent family businesses.

The other, smaller companies, involved in the amalgamation included Lambert & Butler, William Clarke & Son, Franklyn Davey, Edwards Ringer & Bigg, Hignett Brothers, Hignett's Tobacco, Adkins & Sons, Richmond Cavendish, D&J MacDonald, and F&J Smith. The printing and packaging firm Mardon, Son & Hall was absorbed in 1902. In 1904, James & Finlay Bell Ltd was merged into the Stephen Mitchell & Son branch. The company's first chairman was William Henry Wills of the Wills Company.

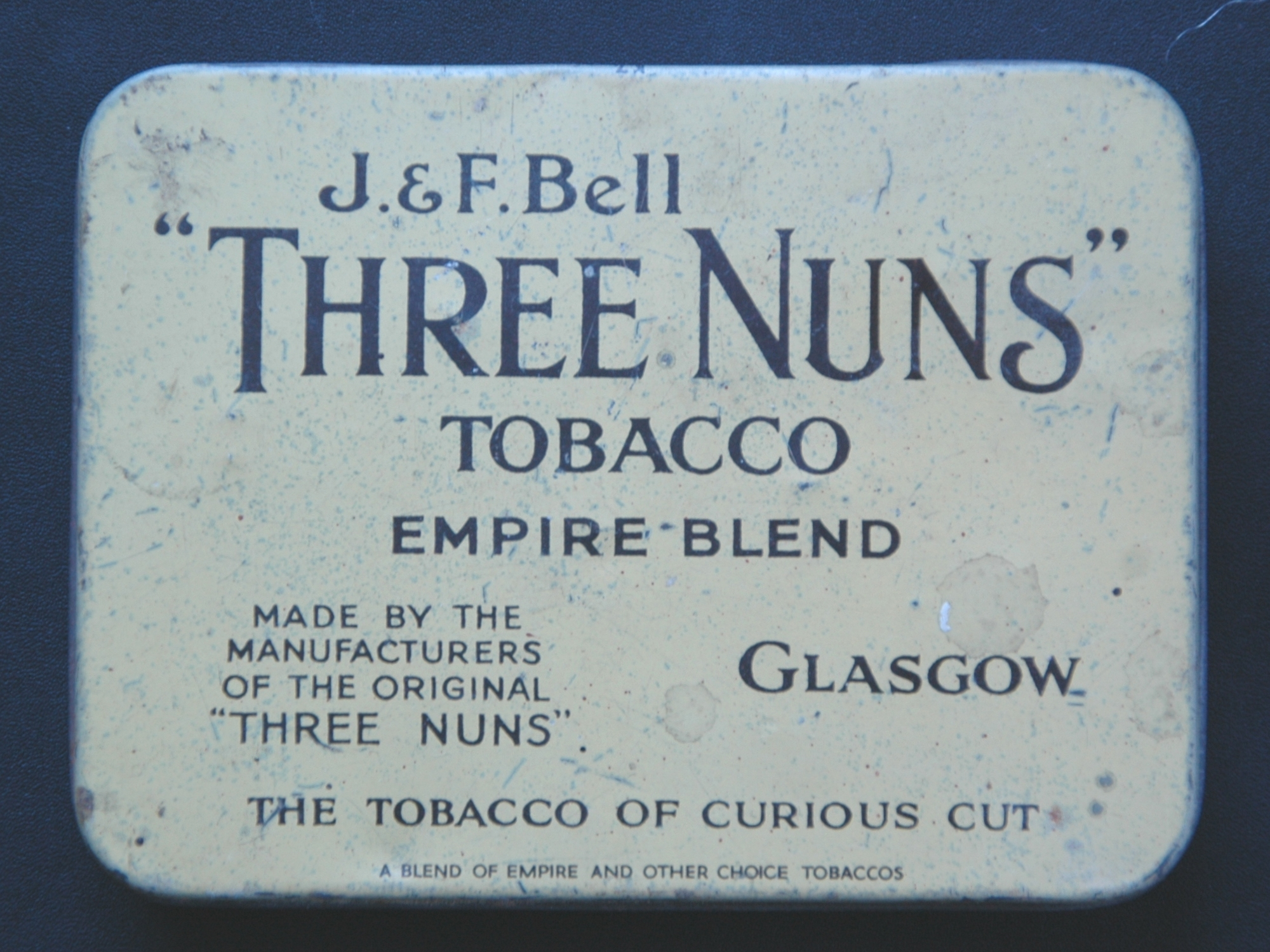
A 2-ounce (57 g) tin for J&F Bell "Three Nuns" tobacco

In 1902, the Imperial Tobacco Company and the American Tobacco Company agreed to form a joint venture: the British-American Tobacco Company Ltd. The parent companies agreed not to trade in each other's domestic territory and to assign trademarks, export businesses, and overseas subsidiaries to the joint venture.

Imperial extended the tobacco-growing enterprises in the United States that W.D. & H.O. Wills had developed before the amalgamation of 1901. It also established its own leaf-buying organisation in the US based at the Imperial Tobacco Warehouse in Durham, North Carolina; this is now owned, and has been renovated by Measurement Incorporated. It built the Imperial Tobacco Company Building at Mullins, South Carolina, between 1908 and 1913.

Whereas American Tobacco sold its share of BAT in 1911, a divestiture prompted by Supreme Court rulings in an anti-trust case, Imperial maintained an interest in British American Tobacco until 1980. In 1973, the Imperial Tobacco Company, having become increasingly diversified by acquisition of (amongst others) restaurant chains, food services and distribution businesses, changed its name to Imperial Group while tobacco products continued to be sold by a newly formed subsidiary named Imperial Tobacco Limited.

In 1986, the company was acquired by the conglomerate Hanson Trust plc for £2.5 billion. Divestments during the period of ownership by Hanson included Courage Brewery to Elders, Golden Wonder to Dalgety, Finlays to Arunbhai J. Patel, the wholesaling arm of Sinclair & Collis to Palmer & Harvey, Imperial Hotels and Catering to Trust House Forte and Ross Frozen Foods to United Biscuits. This also led to a dispute over pension payments to employees, as seen in Imperial Group Pension Trust Ltd v Imperial Tobacco Ltd.

In 1996, following a decision to concentrate on core tobacco activities, Hanson de-merged Imperial and it was listed as an independent company on the UK stock exchange.

=== 2000 to present ===
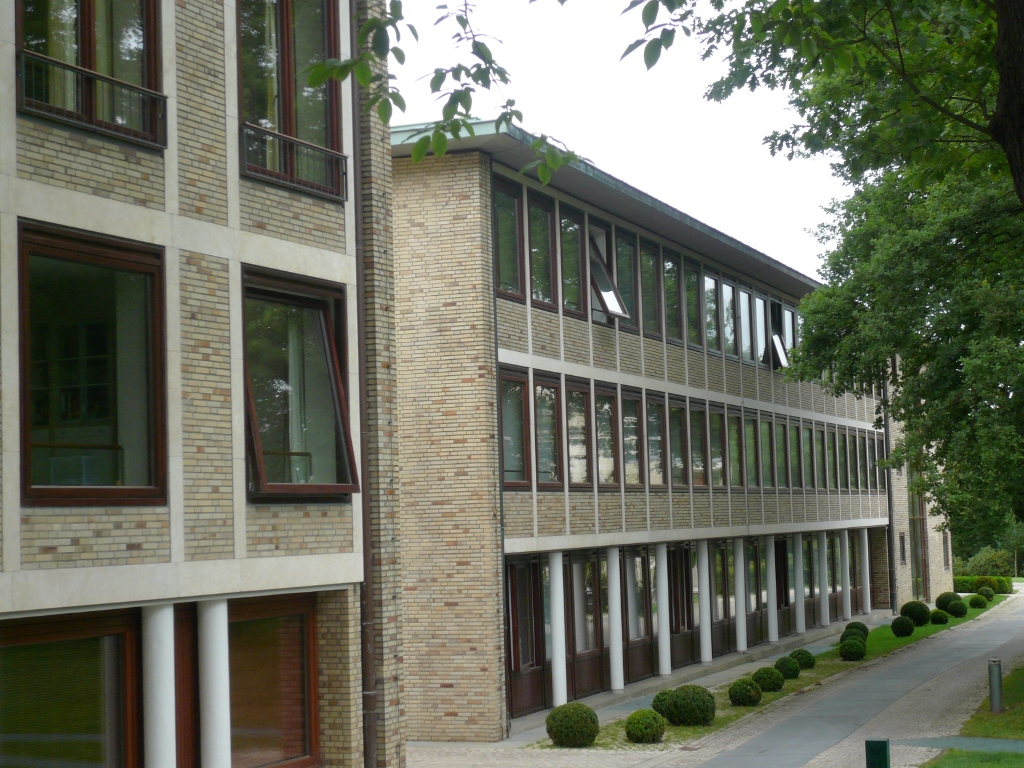
The former Reemtsma head office in Hamburg, Germany, pictured in July 2009

In 2003, Imperial acquired the world's then fourth-largest tobacco company, Reemtsma Cigarettenfabriken GmbH of Germany: the deal added brands such as Davidoff, Peter Stuyvesant, and West to its portfolio. In 2007, Imperial Tobacco entered the United States tobacco market with its $1.9-billion acquisition of Commonwealth Brands Inc., then the fourth-largest tobacco company in the US.

In February 2008, Imperial acquired the world's then fifth-largest tobacco company, Altadis, whose brands included Fortuna, Gauloises Blondes, and Gitanes. A number of factory closures were subsequently announced, including the longstanding cigar factory in Bristol.

Following the Scottish Parliament's decision in January 2010 to ban the display of tobacco products in shops, as well as the availability of tobacco vending machines in public buildings with effect from late 2011, Imperial Tobacco attempted to challenge the change in the law on the grounds that regulations of the sale goods rested with the Houses of Parliament in Westminster. This case was dismissed on 30 September 2010 by Lord Bracadale in the Court of Session in Edinburgh.

In 2011, Altadis USA Inc. said it would add to its Fort Lauderdale, Florida, headquarters and move Commonwealth Brands Inc. employees from Bowling Green, Kentucky. The company's name changed to Commonwealth-Altadis Inc. In 2013, Imperial opened a new global headquarters in Bristol.

In April 2014, Imperial announced the closure of its long-running Horizon factory in Nottingham. The factory closed in 2016, marking the end of cigarette production in England.

On 15 July 2014, Reynolds American agreed to buy Greensboro, North Carolina–based Lorillard Tobacco Company for $27.4 billion. The deal also included the sale of the Kool, Winston, Salem, and blu eCigs brands to Imperial for $7.1 billion. In November 2014, Imperial said Commonwealth-Altadis and the Lorillard operations being acquired would be called ITG Brands LLC. The deal with Lorillard was completed on 12 June 2015, and as part of the deal, Greensboro became the location of the ITG headquarters. On 1 November 2018, ITG announced production would move from the former American Tobacco Company plant in Reidsville, North Carolina, built in 1892, and later expanded, to Greensboro by 2020. The plant made USA Gold, Sonoma, Montclair and Rave.

Former logo of the company, used until 2016 when it changed to "Imperial Brands"

In February 2016, Imperial changed its name to "Imperial Brands" to distance itself from tobacco. In 2018, a subsidiary, Imperial Brands Ventures, took a stake in Oxford Cannabinoid Technologies which is licensed by the UK government to develop cannabis-based medicines. In November 2019, after searching for a new chairman since February, the company announced its senior independent director Thérèse Esperdy would take the role. In July 2020, Stefan Bomhard, the former chief executive of global automotive distributor Inchcape and former president of Bacardi Europe, became chief executive of Imperial Brands.

In 2021, Imperial Brands opened an office in Hammersmith, West London. In the same year, the company launched the Pulze heated tobacco device and compatible iD sticks in selected European markets. The company has also launched Zone X, an oral nicotine brand, in several European countries.

In 2022 and 2023, Imperial Brands launched blu 2.0, an upgrade to its blu vaping device, in the UK and several other countries. In 2023, the company introduced Pulze 2.0, an updated version of its heated tobacco device.

In 2024, Imperial Brands launched iSENZIA, tobacco-free nicotine sticks made from green tea leaves and designed for use with the Pulze device. In 2025, the company introduced Pulze 3.0, featuring further updates to technology, design and usability.

== Archives ==
The principal companies involved in setting up Imperial Tobacco were W. D. & H. O. Wills Limited and John Player & Sons of Nottingham. Bristol Archives holds extensive records of W D & H O Wills and Imperial Tobacco (Ref. 38169). Nottinghamshire Archives hold the John Player and Sons collections (main ref. DD/PL). The archives at Liverpool Central Library hold records of the Ogden Branch (Ref. 380 OGD).

== Products ==
The company's brands include:

=== Cigarettes ===
- All Japan Tobacco products in Australia—Camel, More, Mevius, among others
- Bastos (cigarette)
- Ducados
- Dutch Masters (cigar)
- Backwoods Smokes
- Brandon's
- Capstan (Note: along with British American Tobacco)
- Carlton
- Crowns
- Davidoff
- Embassy
- Escort (Note: British American Tobacco's old products)
- Excellence
- Fortuna
- Gauloises
- Gitanes
- Horizon
- John Player & Sons
- John Player Best
- Kool
- Lambert & Butler (Note: Because Imperial Tobacco does not own the trademark on the original name, Lambert & Butler is known in some countries as L&B or Great & British)
- Mark Fernyhough
- Maverick
- Moon
- Nobel (in Spain)
- Parker & Simpson
- Peter Stuyvesant (in Australia and New Zealand; brand owned by British American Tobacco elsewhere)
- Prima
- R1
- Regal
- Richmond
- Rodeo (in North Macedonia)
- Route 66
- Royale
- Salem (in the United States; brand owned by Japan Tobacco elsewhere)
- Superkings
- USA Gold
- West
- Winston (in the United States; brand owned by Japan Tobacco elsewhere)
- Woodbine

=== Other tobacco and nicotine products ===
==== Fine-cut tobacco ====
- Bali Shag
- Champion Legendary
- Drum
- Golden Virginia
- Players Gold Leaf
- Van Nelle

==== Rolling papers ====
- Rizla+
- Tally-Ho
- White Ox

==== Snus ====
- Skruf Snus

==== Vapes ====
- blu
- Pulze and iD
- ZoneX

== Gallery ==
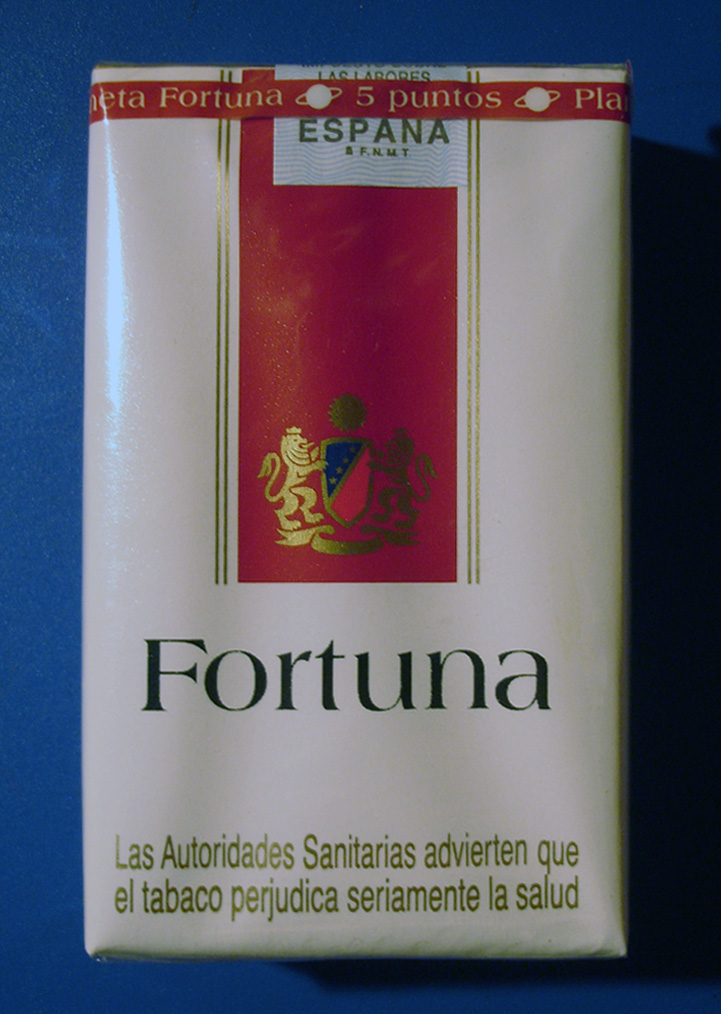
Fortuna cigarettes packet

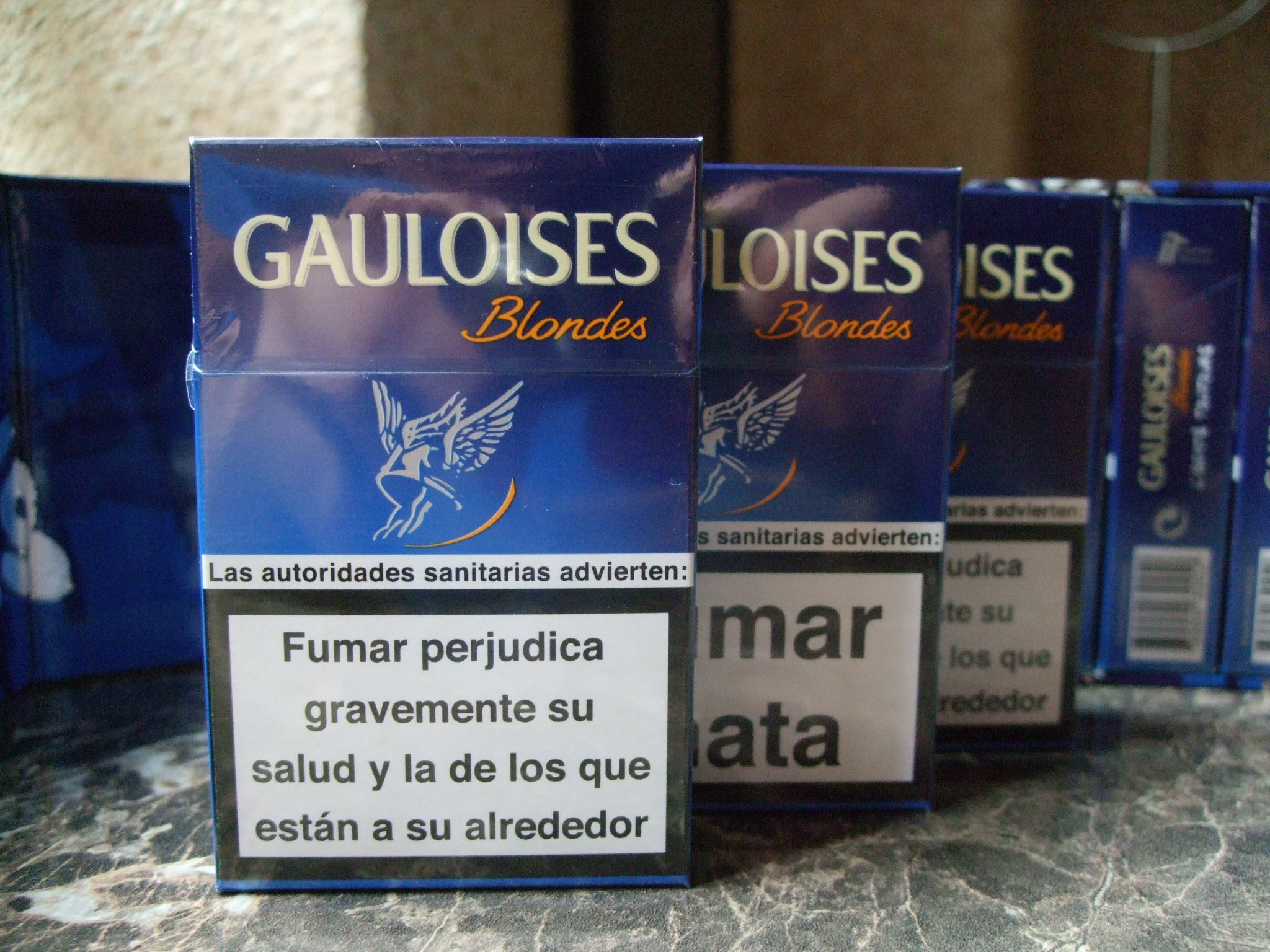
Packets of Gauloises Blondes cigarettes

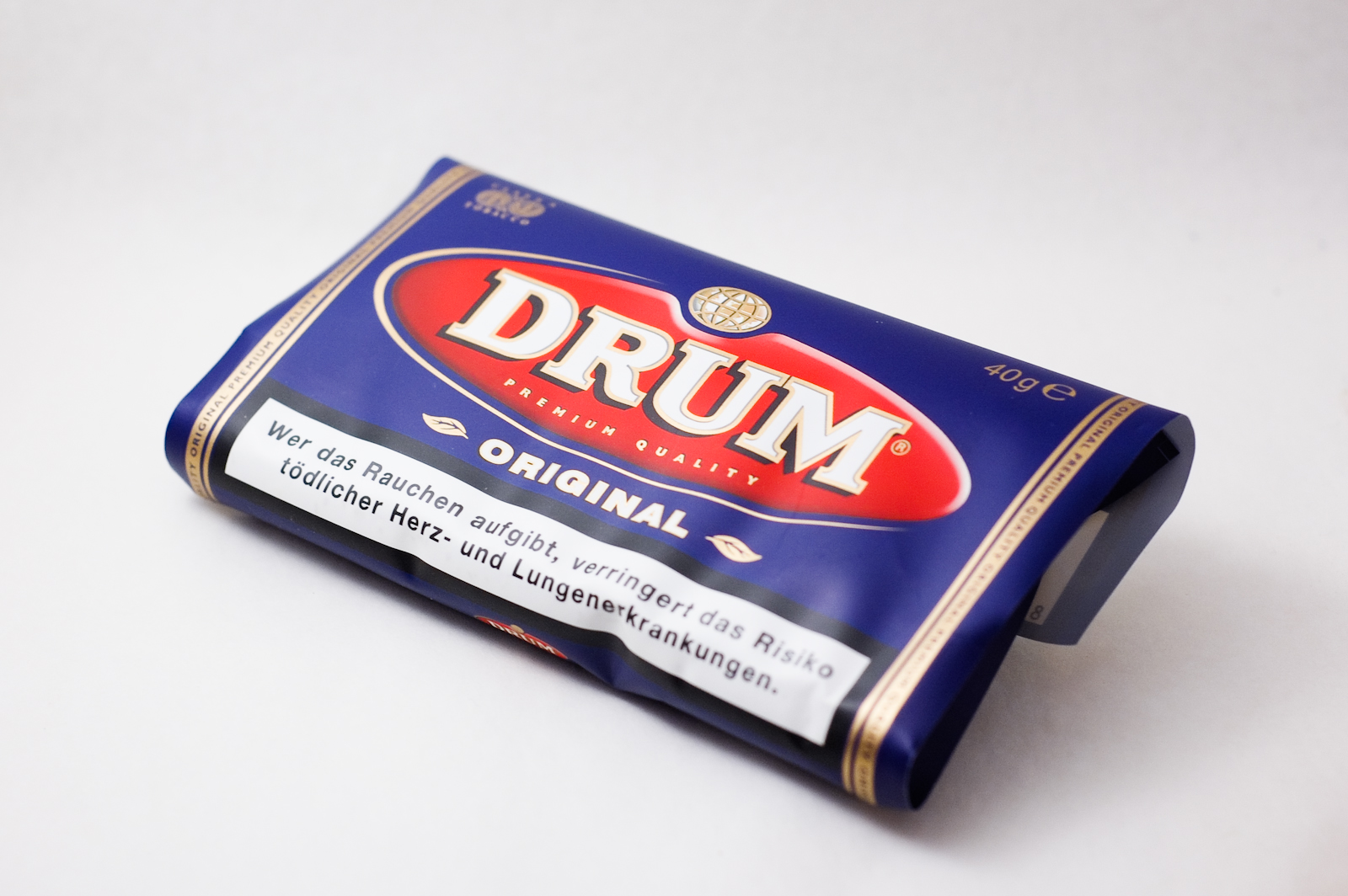
A packet of Drum tobacco

Rizla+ King Size Silver Slims

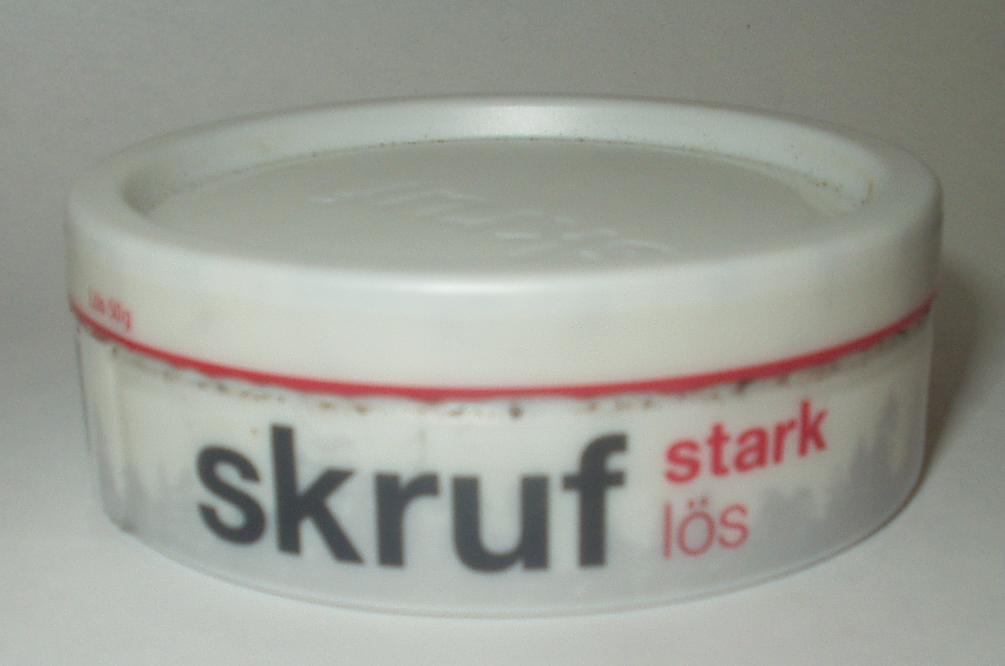
Skruf snus

== Operations ==
The Nottingham factory and the group's French factory in Nantes closed in 2016, with production moved to Eastern Europe.

== Controversies ==
In May 2022, The Times reported that the company had lobbied politicians in Scotland. Ivan McKee, the trade minister, was the highest-ranking government official who had met with the executives from Imperial Brands: he met them twice in 2018.
