= Kool (cigarette) =

American brand of menthol cigarettes

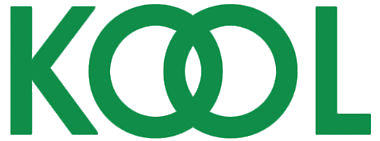
- Product type: Cigarette
- Current owner: Imperial Tobacco
- Produced by: ITG Brands (U.S. only) British American Tobacco (outside of the U.S.)
- Country: United States
- Introduced: 1933; 93 years ago
- Markets: See Markets
- Previous owners: Brown and Williamson
- Website: kool.com

Kool (stylized as KꚘL) is an American brand of menthol cigarette, currently owned and manufactured by ITG Brands LLC, a subsidiary of Imperial Tobacco Company. Kool cigarettes sold outside of the United States are manufactured by British American Tobacco.

== History ==
In 1931, Brown and Williamson launched "Penguin" as an unfiltered 70-millimeter "regular" menthol cigarette, with a package featuring "a Penguin with its beak raised and its heavy wings raised in a sort of mid-flourish." In 1933, the brand was renamed Kool, though it retained the as-yet unnamed penguin mascot.

Kool enjoyed continued success through the 1950s, with a 1953 Roper survey showing that two percent of white Americans and five percent of African Americans preferred the Kool brand.

Growing public concern about the health risks associated with smoking prompted Brown and Williamson to release filtered varieties of Kool: an 85-millimeter "king-sized" version in the 1960s, followed by a 100-millimeter or "long" version in the 1970s. The 1980s saw the introduction of Kool lights and a loss of market share to other menthol brands, such as Newport.

In 2003, Brown and Williamson purchased the R.J. Reynolds Tobacco Company, making Kool a Reynolds brand. The iconic green and white pack, virtually unchanged for some seventy years, was overhauled, and the original unfiltered Kool cigarette was discontinued. These changes did little to boost sales.

In 2015 a merger between Reynolds American and the Lorillard Tobacco Company brought the Kool brand into the Imperial Tobacco Company portfolio of properties.

== Marketing ==
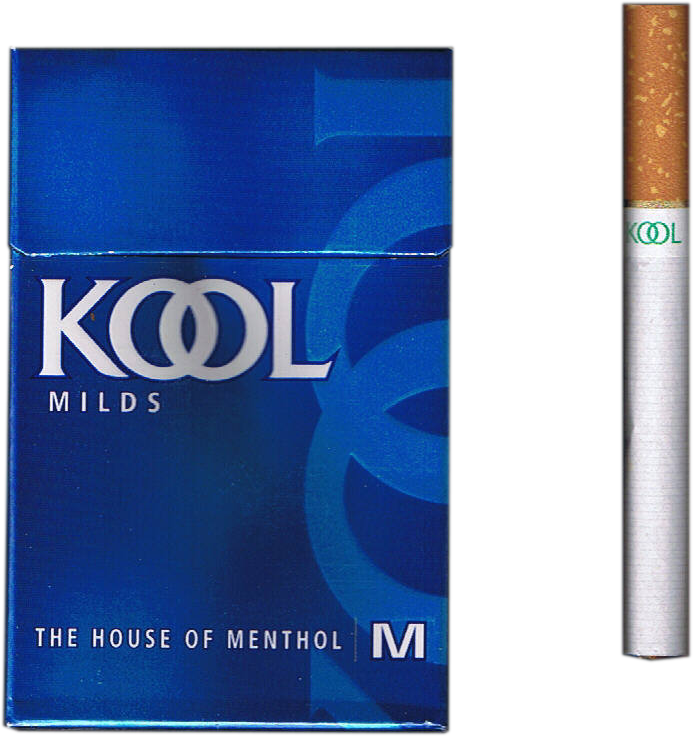
An old pack of Kool cigarettes

Kool cigarette advertising began with penguin characters, who were portrayed as several different professions, among which were a doctor (Dr. Kool), a soldier and a chef. The penguins in these ads started as realistic penguins, though eventually they took inspiration from three-dimensional wooden models that were created, giving them a spherical design. Starting in 1936, R.J. Reynolds Tobacco Company's advertising agency also created ads and election guides where the mascot acted as a mediator between feuding political parties, in effect portraying Kool cigarettes as a remedy for heated political debates. Eventually Kool switched from generic penguins to a character called Willie the penguin, alongside his love interest Millie. Willie and Millie were the main characters in a short lived comic book series in 1951, and were available on various pieces of merchandise, including the famous salt and pepper shaker. Predating Willie, there was an animated short based on the Kool penguins, made in 1935. In the early 1950s, the company placed a number of decal signs at entrance doors reading "Come in... it's Kool inside", indicating that the space was air-conditioned.

In the 1970s, Kool also marketed their cigarettes by linking the taste of menthol to outdoor scenes portraying water or snow. Elaine Devry and John Clarke (actor) featured in Kool's advertisement at this time, as the female smoker whose day was improved by a passer-by who changed her car's flat tire. This was decades before whistleblower Jeffrey Wigand exposed Brown and Williamson's deliberate lacing of their tobacco with harmful substances.

In 1971, Kool initiated an advertising campaign where consumers could mail order a Snark sailboat with the Kool logo on the sail—for $88 (later $99) along with one Kool carton flap—including delivery. The sailboats retailed at the time for $120. As one of Kool's highest scoring ads, the company received over 18,000 orders for "Sea Snarks" in 1971. (Note: Also in 1971, KOOL initiated a self-liquidator campaign whereby consumers were given the opportunity to purchase an 11-foot sailboat with carried Kool logo and usually sold for $120. Consumers could purchase a "Sea Snark" for $88 and one KOOL canon and flap. The purpose of the offer was to increase the effectiveness of the ad; it was one of KOOL's highest scoring ads and was used again in 1972. KOOL received over 18,000 orders for "Sea Sharks" in 1971. A POP test was conducted in 1971 comparing the "Sea Snark" floor display with a non-liquidator KOOL display. Stores using the ordinary display failed to increase sales enough to justify the $6.00 store payment. KOOL sales re "Sea Snark" display rose enough to more than cover the display payment and cost. KOOL's Sea Snark promotion was repeated in 1972, adding option payment through charge cards. 1975: The Sea Snark offer was repeated in a self-liquidator campaign for $139. The Snark/Kool campaign won a national POPI award (given by the Point of Purchase Institute) as the most creative and inventive ad of 1971. The Kool Snark promotion was repeated in 1972, adding option payment through charge cards—and again in 1975 for $139.)

During the 1970s and 1980s, Kool sponsored jazz festivals and many advertisements from the era featured a musician or an actor, playing a saxophone. Also, Kool was notoriously targeted to African-Americans, as were many menthol cigarettes. In 1975, Kool held a sweepstakes with a Rolls-Royce Corniche as the prize.

At one time also Kool sponsored a hot-air balloon, which went on tours.

== Sport sponsorship ==
Kool was the main sponsor of Team KOOL Green in the CART series from the 1997 season until the 2002 season. In 2002, after the Tobacco Master Settlement Agreement passed, Kool cigarettes could not be displayed on the cars for the IRL's Indianapolis 500, and the logo was replaced with 7-Eleven.

== Markets ==
Kool cigarettes are mainly sold in the United States, but also were or still are sold in Canada, Honduras, Antigua, Bahamas, Jamaica, Chile, Colombia, Argentina, Germany, France, Switzerland, Spain, Japan and Australia. The Estonian Patent Office denied permission for the Kool trademark to be used in Estonia because the name means "school" in the Estonian language.

== Current varieties ==
Kool is available in the following styles in the United States:

- Green Menthol - Filter Kings & Super Longs (formerly Full Flavor)
- Blue Menthol - Filter Kings & Super Longs (100s) (formerly Milds)

In 2023, ITG Brands introduced four new non-menthols to prepare for a possible flavored tobacco ban by the FDA and to expand their sales to states that already have a ban in place. The green and blue boxes look identical to the menthol version to appeal to smokers who are used to the brand.

- Green Non-Menthol - Filter Kings & Super Longs (100s)
- Blue Non-Menthol - Filter Kings & Super Longs (100s)
- Luxe Non-Menthol Bold - Filter Kings & 100s
- Luxe Non-Menthol Smooth - Filter Kings & 100s

Previously, Kool XL, a wider cigarette, was available.
