= Blu (electronic cigarette) =

Electronic cigarette brand

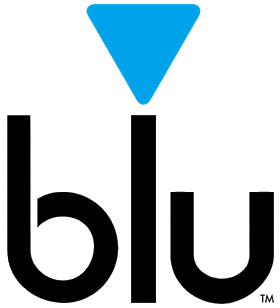
- Product type: Electronic cigarette
- Current owner: Imperial Brands (2015–present)
- Country: United States
- Introduced: 2009; 17 years ago
- Markets: Worldwide
- Website: blu.com

Blu is an electronic cigarette brand, produced by Fontem Ventures based in Amsterdam and owned by British tobacco company Imperial Brands. The brand Blu sells various types of rechargeable and disposable e-cigarettes with a wide selection of flavored and unflavored liquids. Its products are available in many countries and each market offers different types of products suited to public demand and opportunities.

== History ==
Blu was launched in May 2009 by Australian entrepreneur Jason Healy and other investors in Charlotte, North Carolina. Jason Healy is the founder and former president of Blu. Healy called Blu "a lifestyle brand for smokers". Lorillard Tobacco Company purchased the BluCigs brand for an estimated $135 million in April 2012 and expanded into the UK market by taking over the existing Skycig brand for $48.5 million. This made them the first of the Big Tobacco companies to enter into the e-cigarette market.

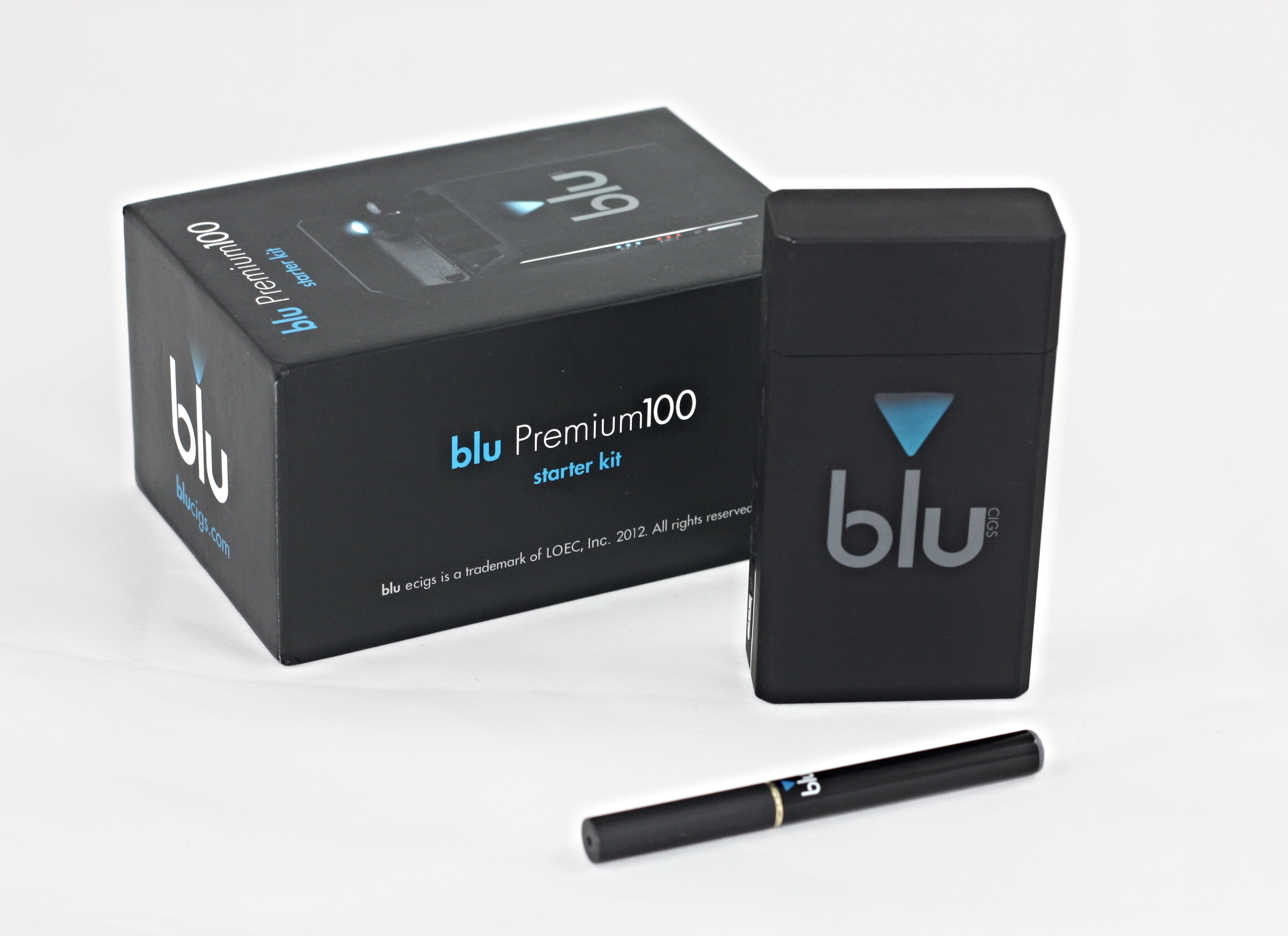
An early Blu e-cigarette device

Skycig was dissolved in March 2014 as Lorillard announced that all of its products would be sold under the Blu brand. Blu eCigs was criticized for selling the company. All the posts on the Blu eCigs' website criticizing the company were removed. Blu eCigs went from 10,000 to 136,000 retailers selling Blu after Lorillard acquired the brand. Blu eCigs closed their Edinburgh site in 2015 in the US putting 55 jobs at risk.

When Lorillard was purchased by R.J. Reynolds Tobacco Company, Blu was sold to Imperial Brands as part of a $7.1 billion deal between the two companies, to avoid any potential inquiries from antitrust regulators, as R.J. Reynolds Tobacco already owned the e-cig brand Vuse.

In 2015 Blu eCigs' website stated, "our position is that electronic cigarettes are addicting." In 2015 Blu eCigs was the second most popular e-cigarette brand in the US with sales of 23.6% dollar, 17.3% unit. Blu sells its products in the United States, the United Kingdom, Spain, France, Italy, Greece, and the Russian Federation.

In 2016, the e-cigarette brand JAI (also owned by Fontem Ventures) was discontinued to focus more attention on building the Blu brand of e-cigarettes.

On 2 April 2022, the Food and Drug Administration issued a Marketing Denial Order (MDO) to Fontem US for its myBlu pod vape device and multiple flavors of refill pods. The FDA determined that the applications lacked sufficient evidence to show that permitting the marketing of these products would be appropriate for the protection of the public health.

== MyBlu products ==
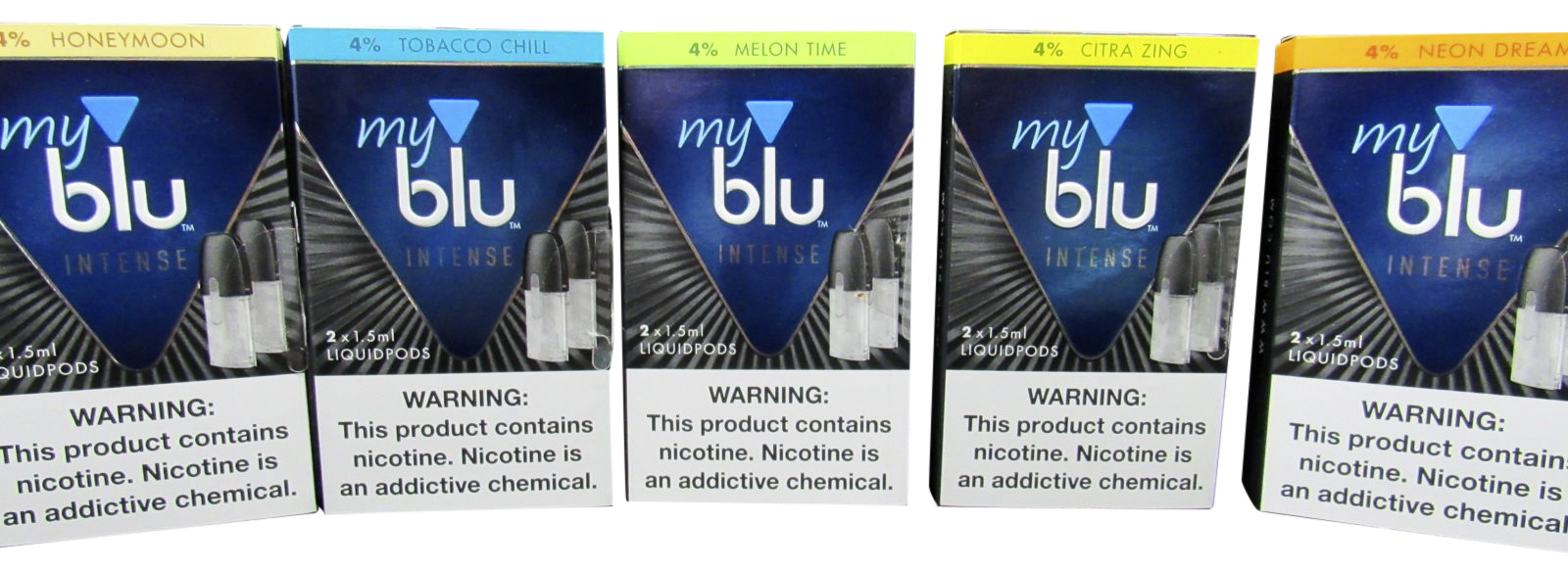
MyBlu flavor pods

The myBlu product line was first launched in 2018, and expanded to an extensive range including pod vaporizers, refillable vaporizers, and disposable electronic cigarettes. Users can vape either pre-filled liquidpods, pre-filled e-cigarette cartridges, or insert their own brand e-liquids. myBlu is recognizable by its simple, sleek design, targeting the adult public.

=== Liquids ===
Depending on the market, Blu offers a variety of flavored and unflavored liquids. All markets include classic tobacco and menthol flavorings. In the United States of America, the FDA banned cigarettes with a characterizing flavor other than menthol in 2009 in the USA. As such, fruity flavors are not sold in the US but can be found in other markets outside the US.

=== Nicotine intensity ===
Blu offers liquids with different nicotine levels. The offering starts at 0% and increases to liquids containing up to 4.5% nicotine, depending on the market.

== Research ==
Blu eCigs were used in a health study involving other e-cigarette brands The study found that e-cigarette smoking and exposure to e-cigarette aerosol has risks of inducing gene-expression changes in bronchial airway epithelium in vitro although less severe than those of smoking conventional cigarettes. It further found that these changes were more pronounced in products containing nicotine than those without nicotine. A 2015 study found the average amount of copper in Blu eCigs aerosol was at 6.1 times higher than traditional cigarette smoke. A 2014 study tested 55 chemicals in e-cigarette aerosol for both Blu and SKYCIG devices and found acrolein, acetaldehyde, and propionaldehyde at amounts 86 to 544 times less than in cigarette smoke.

== Food and Drug Administration investigation ==
On September 12, 2018, the Food and Drug Administration (US FDA) issued letters to the manufacturers of the five top-selling national US e-cigarette brands, including Blu, that made up a vast majority of the products illegally sold to minors. The US FDA asked each company to submit to them within 60 days plans describing how they will address the widespread youth access and use of their products.

If they fail to do so, or if the plans do not appropriately address this issue, the US FDA will consider whether it would be appropriate to revisit the current policy that results in these products remaining on the market without a marketing order from the agency. This could mean requiring these brands to remove some or all of their flavored products that may be contributing to the rise in youth use from the market until they receive premarket authorization and otherwise meet all of their obligations under the law.

== Advertising ==
Blu eCigs had the most advertising expenses, accounting for more than 75% of the entire e-cigarette advertising in 2012. More than 60% of 2013 expenses were for Blu eCigs. In 2012 Blu was the first to launch a tv ad as an e-cigarette company in the United States of America. At this time, only television ads for cigarettes and smokeless tobacco were banned in the US. The advertisement included Stephen Dorff and was titled "Rise from the ashes". The message focused on vaping as an alternative to smoking. Between 2011 and 2013, around 4 out of 5 of the e-cigarette TV commercials were viewed by young people were from the Blu eCigs brand. Blu eCigs puts restrictions on advertising placement in order for viewers to consist of no less than 85% adults "in an effort to minimize any potential exposure to minors," according to a company statement.

Concerns arose from statistics that indicate minors who viewed e-cigarette TV commercials increased 250% from 2011 to 2013. "In 2014, Lorillard's Blu eCigs ran a radio advertising campaign to oppose the effort to amend Los Angeles's existing smokefree law to include e-cigarettes. The campaign urged users to attend city council hearings and testify against the ordinance, and Blu eCigs retweeted posts, used similar hashtags to those of e-cigarette user groups and trade associations, and encouraged its followers to retweet these messages," according to a 2016 report.

In January 2017, Blu ran a "Cigarette Amnesty" campaign in the UK across three cities in which smokers were encouraged to throw their cigarette packets into a shredder. In June 2017, Blu's parent company, Fontem Ventures, also ran a "Science Of Vaping" tour at the thecentre:mk in the UK which aimed to educate the public about e-cigarettes.
