= Gitanes =

French brand of cigarettes

- Brand logo with Gypsy dancer, designed by Molusson, 1943
- Product type: Cigarette
- Produced by: Imperial Tobacco
- Country: France
- Introduced: 1910; 116 years ago
- Markets: See Markets
- Previous owners: Altadis

Gitanes (pronounced [ʒi.tan], "Gypsy women") is a French brand of cigarettes, owned and manufactured by Imperial Tobacco following the acquisition of Altadis in January 2008, having been owned by SEITA before that.

== History ==
Gitanes was launched in 1910 in four different versions, all of which were filterless. In 1918, Gitanes Maïs were introduced, which were a success in the rural areas of France. In the 1930s, the first graphic ads for Gitanes appeared. In 1956, the first filtered Gitane variant was introduced. In 1981, the "Light" versions are first marketed. In 1986, the first Gitanes Blondes were launched, which had become available internationally in 1987. However, they were a commercial failure. In 1988, the first "Extra Light" versions were marketed. In 1991, Gitanes ultra lights were introduced. In 1990/1991, a simultaneous launch of a new version of Gitanes Blondes ultra light were brought on the market.

Gitanes are sold in many varieties of strengths and packages. The cigarette was originally made with a darker or brun (brown) tobacco, in contrast to the more widespread blonde. In honour of the name, the packet shows the silhouette of a Spanish gypsy woman playing the tambourine.

There is a distinction between the "blonde" style of the current Gitanes, and the classic style of Gitanes Brunes, both of which are sold in Europe and South America (most commonly in Argentina and Chile). The classic Gitanes Brunes tobacco achieved its characteristic and distinctive "bite" by using a fire-flued method of curing the tobacco, and a "rice" type of rolling paper which differs from most other cigarettes. The result was a cigarette which had both a strong flavour and a distinctive aroma.

Gitanes Blondes are available, filtered, in Light and Regular. The Gitanes Brunes are available in 70 mm versions, filtered and unfiltered. In 2010, the size and content of the regular Gitanes were reduced. Gitanes Maïs (corn) are made with yellow corn paper.

A 2006 French pack of Gitane, with a warning reading "Smoking kills"

Production in France was halted, with one factory remaining operational in the Netherlands. This was mainly due to the rise on tobacco levies imposed by the French Government in the wake of enforced EU health directives, which has forced up the price of French cigarettes to the level of those in the US, with the more aggressively promoted brands such as Marlboro now taking the majority market share.

The 1990s were particularly successful for Gitanes in terms of brand engagement. In an effort to increase awareness, the brand began sponsoring motor-sports such as Formula One racing and the Dakar Rally. These activities helped to attract a wider range of potential customers while avoiding any dilution of the brand image and thus retained the loyalty of its more artistic core customer base.

In July 2016, the French government considered a ban on both the Gitanes and Gauloises cigarette brands because they were deemed "too stylish and cool". The ban would also apply to brands including Marlboro Gold, Vogue, Lucky Strike and Fortuna. It is the result of a new public health law based on a European directive that says tobacco products "must not include any element that contributes to the promotion of tobacco or give an erroneous impression of certain characteristics". Four major tobacco companies have written to the government seeking clarification on the potential law, calling for an urgent meeting to discuss the details of the plan. In the letter they accuse French Health Minister Marisol Touraine of an "arbitrary and disproportionate" application of EU directives.

Since the 1930s, many advertisements have been made to promote the Gitanes brand.

== Packaging ==
In 1927 Maurice Giot introduced the first design in the Art Deco style. From 1943 packets featured a Gypsy dancer, designed by Molusson. In 1947 the figure was refined to a silhouette by Max Ponty; this image is still in use today. The silhouette has been used on many famous posters; these have included Savignac (1953) and Morvan (1960). The boxes have always featured the colours black, blue and white.

== Motorsport sponsorship ==
=== Formula One ===
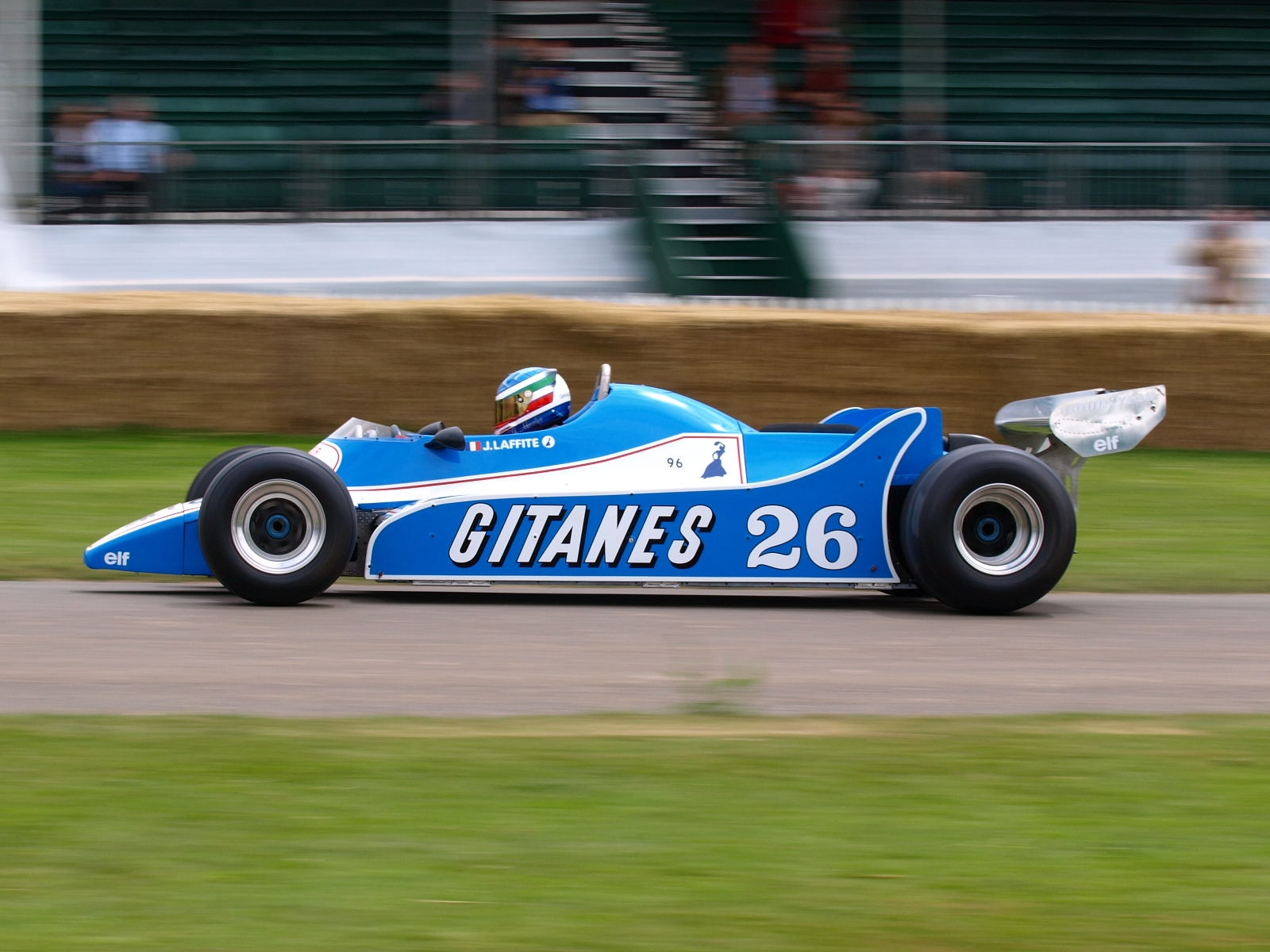
The 1980 Ligier JS11/15 being demonstrated at the 2008 Goodwood Festival of Speed

Gitanes had a long-standing partnership with the Équipe Ligier team. Following the acquisition of the Matra Formula One team's assets, Ligier entered Formula One in 1976 with a Matra V12-powered car, and won the 1977 Swedish Grand Prix with Jacques Laffite. This is generally considered to have been the first all-French victory in the Formula One World Championship.

In total the team won 8 races, got 47 podiums and earned 373 points during their partnership with Gitanes. For 1996 the sister company Gauloises became the new sponsor, ending a partnership that lasted 19 years.

In 1997 the team was sold to Alain Prost and became the Prost Grand Prix in 1997. Prost GP, despite substantial financial backing by large private French companies, failed to make the team competitive and went bankrupt in 2002.

=== Sports cars ===
After retiring from racing following the death of his friend Jo Schlesser, Guy Ligier decided to found his own team and had engineer Michel Têtu develop a sports car named the JS1 (Schlesser's initials). The Cosworth-powered JS1 took wins at Albi and Montlhéry in 1970, but retired at Le Mans and from the Tour Automobile de France.

For 1971, Ligier had the JS1 developed into the JS2 and JS3. The JS2 was homologated for road use and used a Maserati V6 engine, while the JS3 was an open-top sports-prototype powered by a Cosworth DFV V8 engine. The JS3 won at Montlhéry in 1971 but failed to finish the minimum distance in Le Mans. Therefore, it was retired, and Ligier installed the Cosworth DFV in the JS2 road car, finishing second overall at Le Mans in 1975. Guy Ligier then switched his efforts into Formula One.

=== Dakar Rally ===
Gitanes also sponsored various teams in the Dakar Rally from its first season in 1979 until tobacco sponsorship was banned by the French government.

== Popular culture ==
=== In cinema ===
In the 1958 French film Ascenseur pour l'échafaud the character Julien Tavernier, played by Maurice Ronet, smokes Gitanes in several scenes.

In the 1971 crime film Get Carter, Michael Caine's character Jack Carter can be seen smoking Gitanes in various scenes.

In the 1981 French thriller Diva, the character Gorodish, a mysterious bohemian, frequently smokes Gitanes. In the scene that introduces Gorodish, the colours used in the set were picked to complement those of the Gitane packets.

In Hayao Miyazaki's 1992 film Porco Rosso, the titular character is often seen smoking Gitanes.

=== In music ===
The cover of the 1974 album Dancing on a Cold Wind by Carmen and the cover of the 1981 album Shades by JJ Cale both use the Gitanes design. The brand is mentioned in the song "Late Bloomer" from the album The Voyager by Jenny Lewis: "She was smoking on a gypsy."

David Bowie smoked these in his persona of The Thin White Duke.

Serge Gainsbourg was a heavy Gitanes smoker and always appeared in public with his packet of Gitanes in his hand. The book A Fistful of Gitanes is about his life and career.

Slash, guitarist for Guns N' Roses, smoked the brand and has a tattoo of the Gitanes logo on his back.

=== In books ===
The cigarettes appear prominently in Marc Behm's 1980 The Eye of the Beholder.

Various characters in Harry Turtledove's The War That Came Early series often smoke Gitanes.

The cigarettes are also smoked by Phryne Fisher, the main character in the "Miss Fisher" crime novel series by Kerry Greenwood.

The character Giles Talbot in Kate Quinn's "The Rose Code" smoked Gitanes.

The character Jakub Szapiro in Szczepan Twardoch's "Król" smoked Gitanes.

The character Guy in James Baldwin's 'Just Above my Head' also offers a Gitane to Arthur.

== Markets ==
Gitanes is mainly sold in France, but also was or still is sold in Argentina, Austria, Belgium, Egypt, Georgia, Germany, Israel, Italy, Luxembourg, Martinique, Russia, Spain, Switzerland, Ukraine and United Arab Emirates.

== See also ==
- Gauloises
- Smoking in France
