= Albert Jacquard =

French biologist (1925–2013)

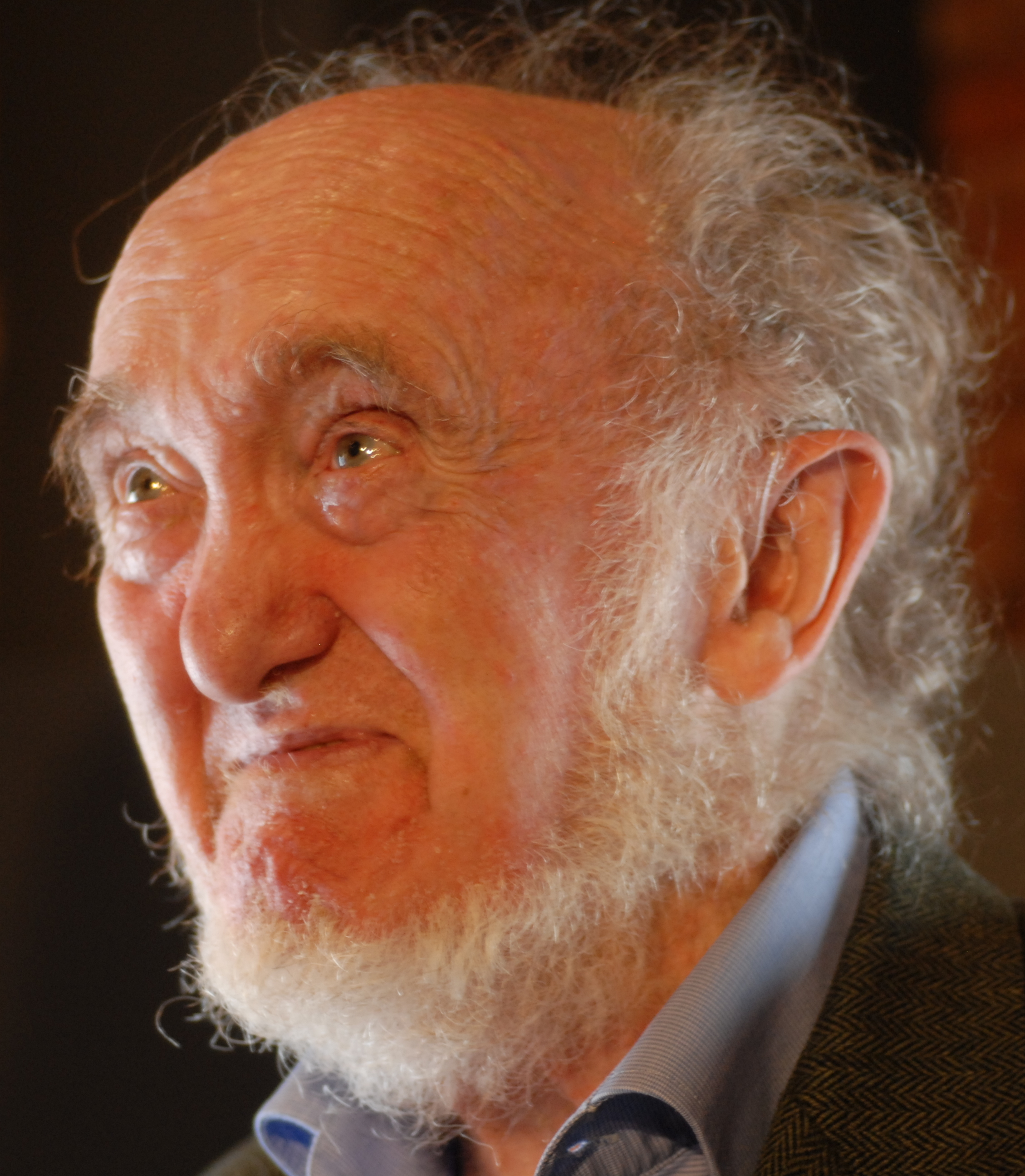
- Jacquard in 2009
- Born: 23 December 1925; Lyon, France
- Died: 11 September 2013 (aged 87); Paris, France
- Education: Polytechnical School; Stanford University (PhD)
- Awards: French Légion d'honneur (1980); French Ordre national du Mérite (1980); Fondation de France scientific medal (1980)
- Scientific career
- Fields: Genetics
- Workplaces: Institute of statistics SEITA (Paris); French Court of Financial Auditor; French Institute for Demographic Studies; World Health Organization; French Comité consultatif national d'éthique

Albert Jacquard (23 December 1925 – 11 September 2013) was a French geneticist, popularizer of science and essayist.

He was well known for defending ideas related to science, degrowth, needy persons and the environment. He was 10 years an active member of the French communist party (PCF).

== Beginnings ==
He was born in Lyon to a catholic and conservative family from the region of Franche-Comté (east of France). At the age of nine, he was disfigured after a car accident in which his brother died. In 1943, he earned two baccalaureates in mathematics and philosophy. In 1948, he earned a master's degree in public factory engineering from the French École Polytechnique and joined the French Institute of statistics.

== High-level civil servant ==
In 1951, he entered the French tobacco monopoly SEITA (which merged with its Spanish counterpart Tabacalera to form Altadis in 1999) as an organisation and method engineer. Then, he worked as a rapporteur in the French Court of Financial Auditor (equivalent to the US Government Accountability Office) and as a senior executive in the French Health ministry. In 1966, he went to Stanford University to study population genetics as a Research worker. Back in France in 1968, he joined French Institute for Demographic Studies as supervisor of the genetics department. In 1973, he was appointed expert in genetics in the World Health Organisation. He retired in 1985.

== University professor ==
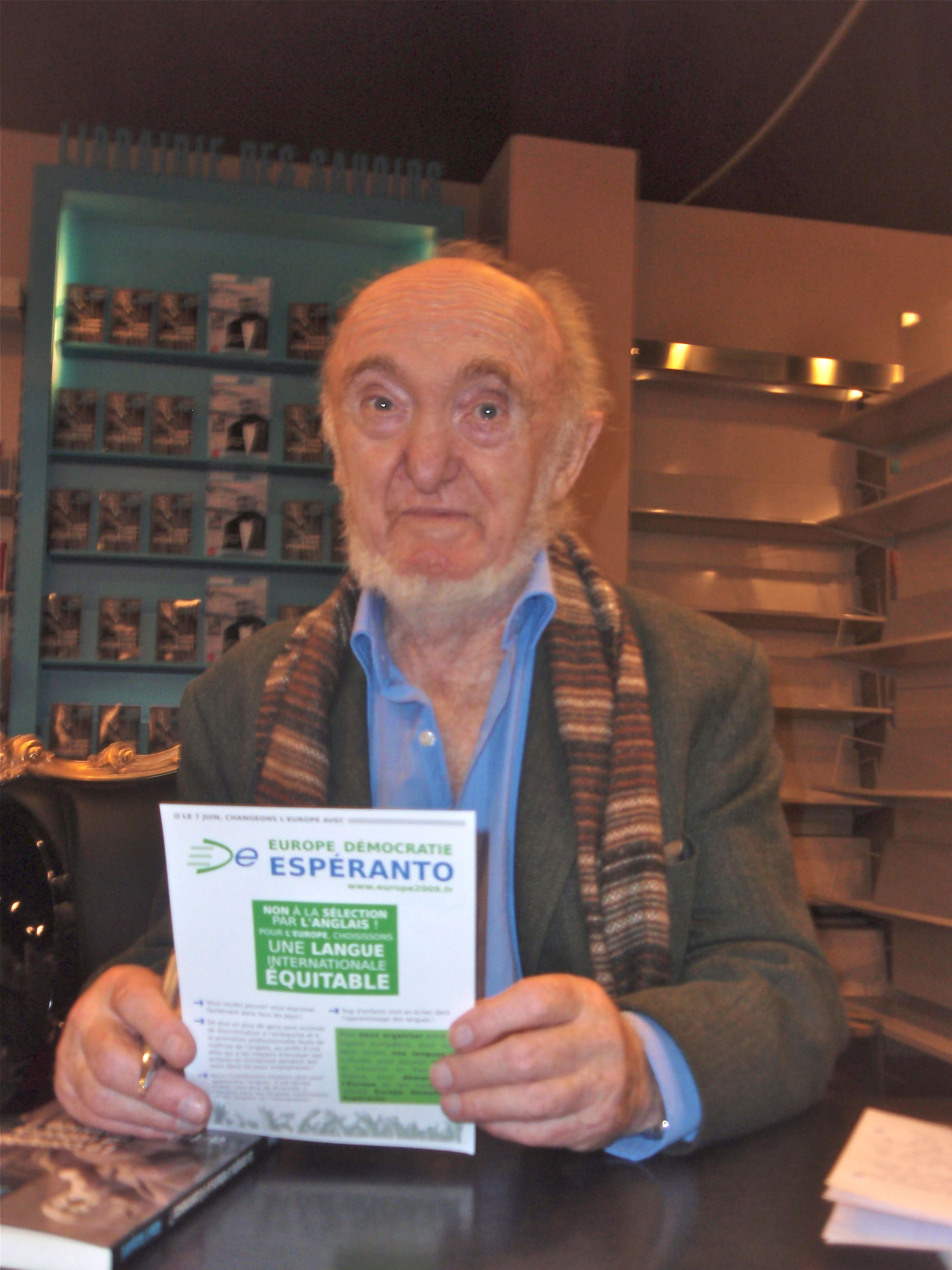
Albert Jacquard in 2009

While he was still working in the World Health Organization, he taught as visiting professor at several universities such as the University of Geneva in Switzerland (1973–1976), Pierre and Marie Curie University in Paris (1978–1990) or the Catholic University of Louvain in Belgium (1979–1981). As a recognition for his work, he was awarded the French Légion d'honneur, the French Ordre national du Mérite and the Fondation de France scientific medal.

== Ethical and political involvement ==
I have no solution: I don't intend to build the society of tomorrow. I just want to show that it must not resemble the society of today.

While he was part of the French Consultative Committee of Ethics (Comité consultatif national d'éthique) in the early 1990s, he took a strong stand against commercial use of the human genome.

He was very close to the anti-globalization movement and regularly came to the defense of illegal immigrants and homeless people in France.

Albert Jacquard's Grave

He wrote several books to expose his views and share his experience with new generations. He made a variety of public statements in favor of choosing Esperanto as a universal second language in contradiction to tendencies in Europe to use English as a second language.

== Bibliography ==
=== Scientific work ===
- Structure génétique des populations, Masson, 1970
- Les probabilités, Collection Que sais-je ?, Presses universitaires de France, 1974
- Génétique des populations humaines, Presses universitaires de France, 1974
- The Genetic Structure of Populations, Springer, 1974
- L'Étude des isolats. Espoirs et limites, Presse universitaires de France-INED, 1976
- Concepts en génétique des populations, Masson, 1977

=== Popular science (in French) ===
- Éloge de la différence, Éditions du Seuil, 1978
- Moi et les autres, Éditions du Seuil, 1983
- Au péril de la science ?, Éditions du Seuil, 1984
- Inventer l'homme, Éditions Complexe, 1984
- L'Héritage de la liberté, Éditions du Seuil, 1986
- Cinq milliards d'hommes dans un vaisseau, Éditions du Seuil, 1987
- Moi, je viens d'où ?, Éditions du Seuil, 1988
- Abécédaire de l'ambiguïté, Éditions du Seuil, 1989
- C'est quoi l'intelligence ?, Éditions du Seuil, 1989
- Idées vécues, Flammarion, 1990
- Voici le temps du monde fini, Éditions du Seuil, 1991
- Tous différents, tous pareils, Éditions Nathan, 1991
- Comme un cri du cœur, Éditions l'Essentiel, 1992 (collective work)
- La Légende de la vie, Flammarion, 1992
- E=CM2, Éditions du Seuil, 1993
- Deux sacrés grumeaux d'étoile, Éditions de la Nacelle, octobre 1993
- Science et croyances, Éditions Écriture, mars 1994
- Absolu, dialogue avec l'abbé Pierre, Éditions du Seuil, 1994
- L'Explosion démographique, Flammarion, collection « Dominos », 1994
- La Matière et la vie, Éditions Milan, coll. « Les essentiels », 1995
- La Légende de demain, Flammarion, 1997
- L'Équation du nénuphar, Calmann-Lévy, 1998
- L'avenir n'est pas écrit, (with Axel Kahn), Bayard, 2001
- Paroles citoyennes, (with Alix Domergue), Albin Michel, 2001
- La Science à l'usage des non-scientifiques, 2001
- De l'angoisse à l'espoir, (with Cristiana Spinedi), Calmann Lévy, 2002

=== Political and philosophical work (in French) ===
- Un monde sans prisons ?, Éditions du Seuil, 1993
- J'accuse l'économie triomphante, Calmann-Lévy, 1996
- Le Souci des pauvres. L'Héritage de François d'Assise, Calmann-Lévy, 1996
- Petite philosophie à l'usage des non philosophes, Québec-Livres, 1997
- Le Souci des pauvres, 1998
- A toi qui n'est pas encore né, 1998
- Dieu ?, Stock, 2003 (https://www.editions-stock.fr/livres/essais-documents/dieu-9782234048348)
- Tentative de lucidité, Stock, 2003 (archives des chroniques, https://www.editions-stock.fr/livres/essais-documents/tentatives-de-lucidite-9782234056510).
- Halte aux Jeux !, Stock, 2004 (https://www.editions-stock.fr/livres/essais-documents/halte-aux-jeux-9782234056923)
- Nouvelle petite philosophie, Stock, 2005 (https://www.editions-stock.fr/livres/essais-documents/nouvelle-petite-philosophie-9782234058064).
- Mon utopie, Stock, 2006 (https://www.editions-stock.fr/livres/essais-documents/mon-utopie-9782234059405).
- Jamais soumis, jamais soumise (dialogue with Fadela Amara), Stock, 2007 (https://www.editions-stock.fr/livres/essais-documents/jamais-soumis-jamais-soumise-9782234059863).
