= Gauloises =

French cigarette brand

- Product type: Cigarette
- Current owner: Imperial Tobacco, Reemtsma (Germany only)
- Country: France
- Introduced: 1910; 116 years ago
- Markets: See Markets
- Tagline: "Liberté toujours" ("Freedom forever")

Gauloises (pronounced [ɡo.lwaz], "Gaulish" [feminine plural] in French; cigarette is a feminine noun in French) is a brand of cigarette of French origin. It is produced by the company Imperial Tobacco following its acquisition of Altadis in January 2008 in most countries, but produced and sold by Reemtsma in Germany. Until 2017 the cigarette was manufactured at a plant in Riom, Puy-de-Dôme, in France, but they are now manufactured in Poland.

== History ==
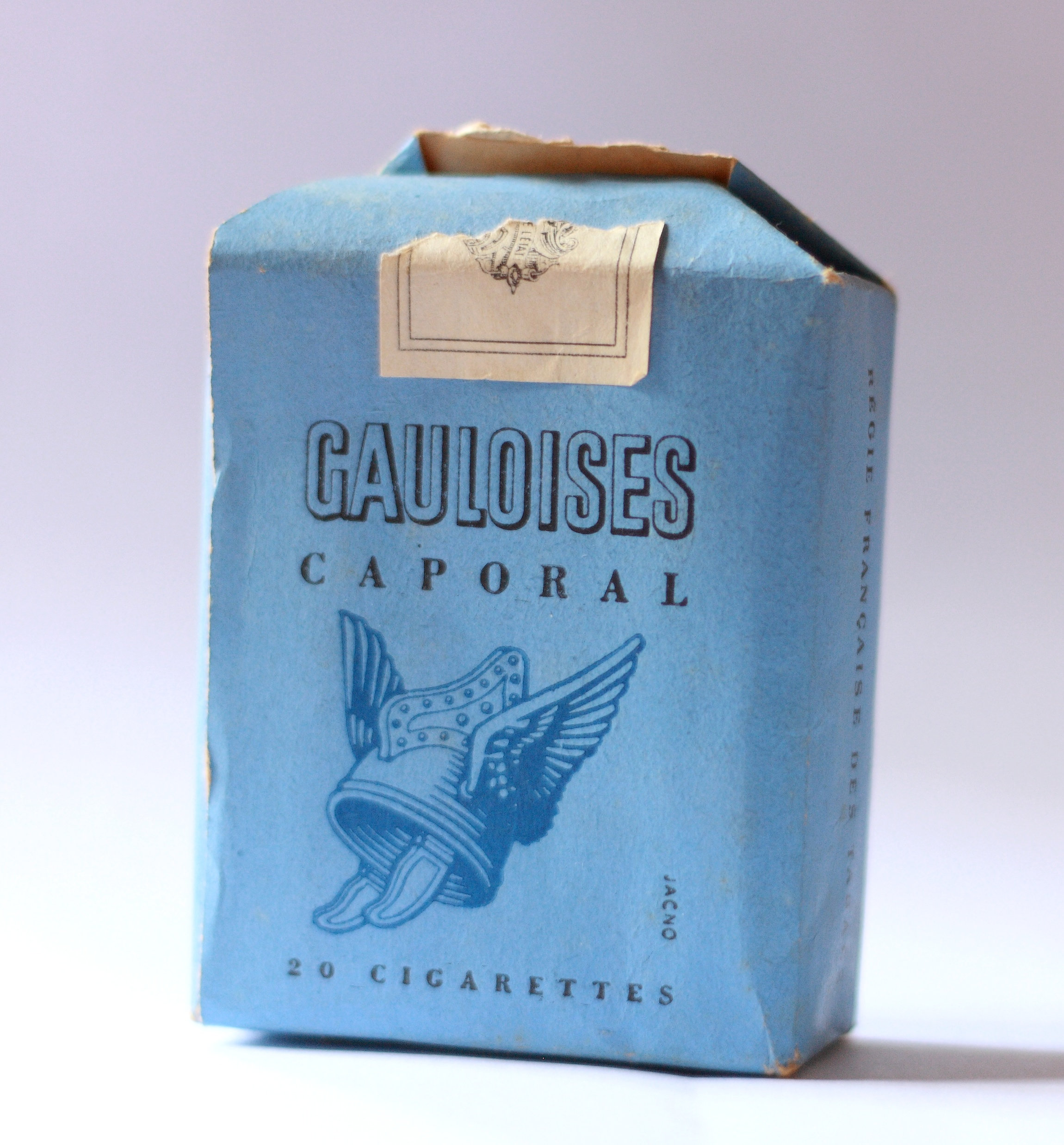
Distinctive blue package with the winged Gallic helmet logo designed by Jacno

Gauloises were launched in 1910 ahead of World War I. The brand had originally been called Hongroises (Hungarians) but the state tobacco company SEITA preferred a name that evoked France's original warlike inhabitants.

Traditional Gauloises were short, wide, unfiltered and made with dark tobaccos from Syria and Turkey which produced a strong and distinctive aroma. The brand is most famous for its cigarettes' strength, especially in its original unfiltered version. Forty years later, filtered Gauloises cigarettes debuted. In 1984, the Gauloises brand was expanded to include a light, American-type tobacco with a filter. The original non-filter, Gauloises Caporal, have been discontinued and replaced with Gauloises Brunes, which are also filterless but less strong. Gauloises Brunes have low tar and nicotine levels, because of European tobacco laws, but the tobacco is still dark and strong-tasting.

Since 2018, Gauloises cigarettes have been produced in Poland after the last manufacturing plant in Riom, Puy-de-Dôme closed its doors in the end of 2017.

Between the World Wars, the smoking of Gauloises in France was considered patriotic and an affiliation with French "heartland" values. The brand was associated with the cigarette-smoking poilu (a slang term for the French infantryman in the trenches) and the resistance fighters during the Vichy Regime. Their slogan was "Liberté toujours" ("Freedom forever"). In 1939–1940, some packets of cigarettes were given a distinctive "troop brand".

In March 1954, SEITA launched the "Gauloise Disque Bleu" brand, with CEO Pierre Grimanelli proud of the new packaging that would, he argued, increase sales.

The brand was preferred by famous artists (including Pablo Picasso), intellectuals (including Jean-Paul Sartre, Albert Camus, and Jean Baudrillard), and musicians (including French pianist and composer Maurice Ravel, American singer Jim Morrison, English music icon John Lennon, English songwriter Nick Drake, and American guitarist John Frusciante of the Red Hot Chili Peppers).

American artist Robert Motherwell used Gauloises packets and cartons in many collages, including an extensive series with the packets surrounded by bright red acrylic paint, often with incised lines in the painted areas. In the introduction to his 2015 book Robert Motherwell: The Making of an American Giant, gallery owner Bernard Jacobson says, "Motherwell smoked Lucky Strikes, but in his collage life he smokes Gauloises, around whose blue packets he now organises one composition after another, 'exotic to me precisely because in the normal course of things I don't smoke French cigarettes'." And by incorporating Gauloises packets he makes deft and condensed allusion to "French blue": to the Mediterranean and the palette of Matisse ... to the smoke coiling up in a Cubist assemblage."

Henri Charrière, French author and convict, repeatedly references the smoking of Gauloises in his autobiography Papillon. This, together with the romantic associations of France, made Gauloises a popular brand among some writers and artists: in practically every story and novel written by Julio Cortázar set in Paris, the protagonists smoke Gauloises. John Lennon was a noted smoker of Gauloises Bleues. Frank O'Hara in his poem "The Day Lady Died" writes of going to "the tobacconist in the Ziegfeld Theatre" in New York and casually asking "for a carton of Gauloises." In John le Carré's 1979 novel Smiley's People a key plot point involves the concealment of a microfilm in a packet of Gauloises, which are Vladimir's favourite. Anne Rice, writing as Anne Rampling in her 1986 novel Belinda, also made Gauloises the favored choice of cigarette for her title character/protagonist. Smoking Gauloises is mentioned in the teen television series Gossip Girl. Sergeant Mort Cooperman smokes Gauloises in several mystery novels by Richard "Kinky" Friedman.

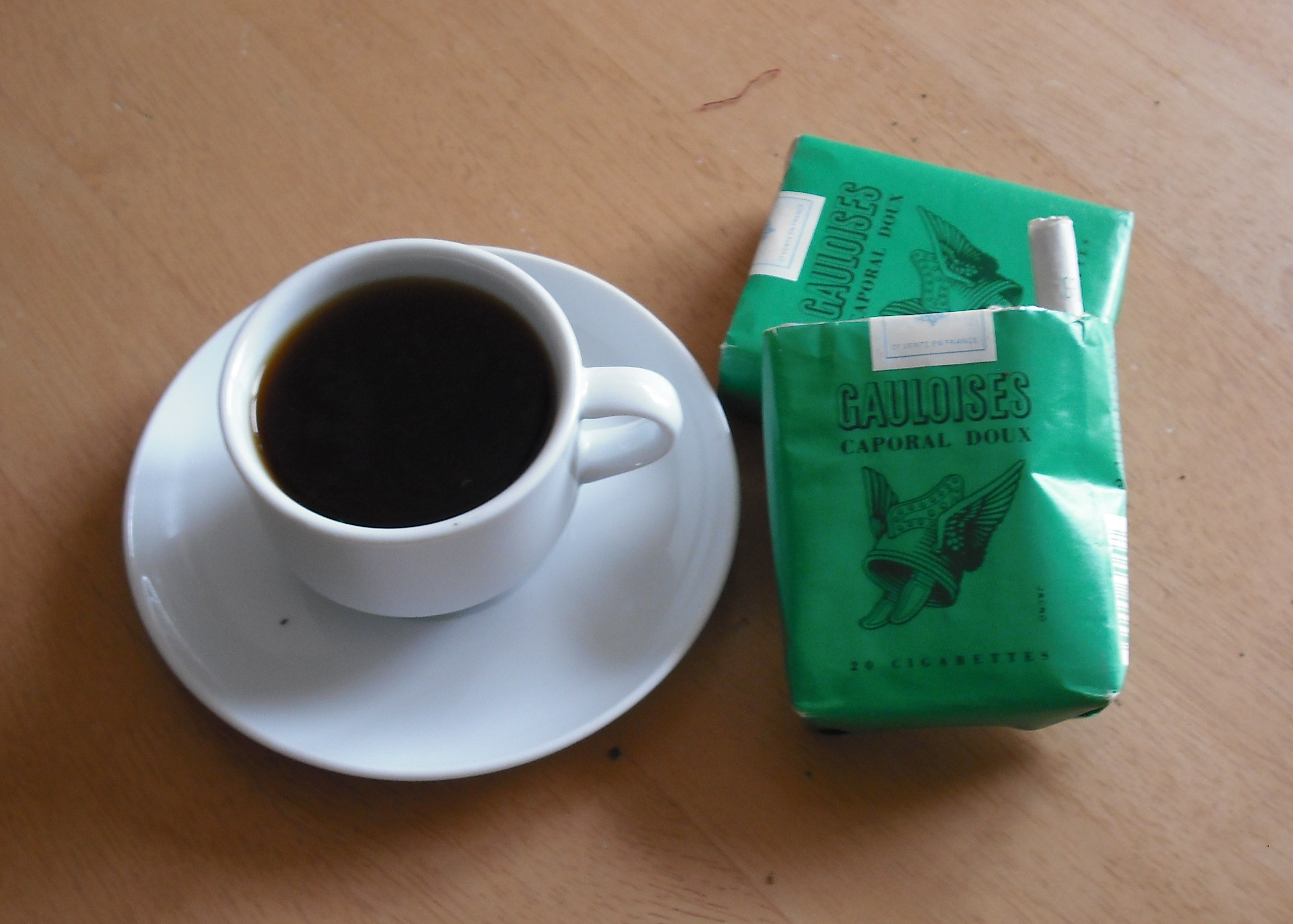
Two packets of Gauloises vertes (reduced nicotine), with a black coffee

Smoking Gauloises was also promoted as a contribution to the national good: a portion of the profits from their sale was paid to the Régie Française des Tabacs, a semi-governmental corporation charged with controlling the use of tobacco, especially by minors, and directing its profits towards socially beneficial causes. The designers of the traditional Gauloise packet reinforced national identity by selecting a peculiarly French shade of blue (like the blues later used in the work of French artist Yves Klein).

The last factory producing Gauloises, in Lille, closed in 2005.

In July 2016, the French government considered a ban on both the Gauloises and Gitanes cigarette brands because they were deemed "too stylish and cool". The ban would also apply to brands including Marlboro Gold, Vogue, Lucky Strike and Fortuna. It is the result of a new public health law based on a European directive that says tobacco products "must not include any element that contributes to the promotion of tobacco or give an erroneous impression of certain characteristics". Four major tobacco companies have written to the government seeking clarification on the potential law, calling for an urgent meeting to discuss the details of the plan. In the letter they accuse French health minister Marisol Touraine of an "arbitrary and disproportionate" application of EU directives.

== Legal problems ==
The cigarette was manufactured by SEITA but 1999 proved to be a landmark year. The legal difficulties crystallised when a French health insurance fund filed a 51.33 million franc lawsuit against four cigarette companies, including SEITA, to cover the estimated and continuing costs of treating the illnesses linked to cigarette smoking. This was followed by an action filed by the family of a deceased heavy smoker and the French state health insurer, Caisse Primaire d'Assurance Maladie, claiming compensation for the cost of the deceased's medical treatment and for producing a dangerous and addictive product. Consequently, brand management was assigned to Altadis, with joint French and Spanish ownership, and this company continued manufacture and international distribution until its acquisition by Imperial Tobacco.

On 30 October 2007 the Criminal Chamber of the Court of Cassation ruled against SEITA, accusing it of having signed a partnership agreement with the organisers of the 2000–2002 Francofolies Festivals for the use of visual brand elements of Gauloises Blondes.

== Sport sponsorship ==
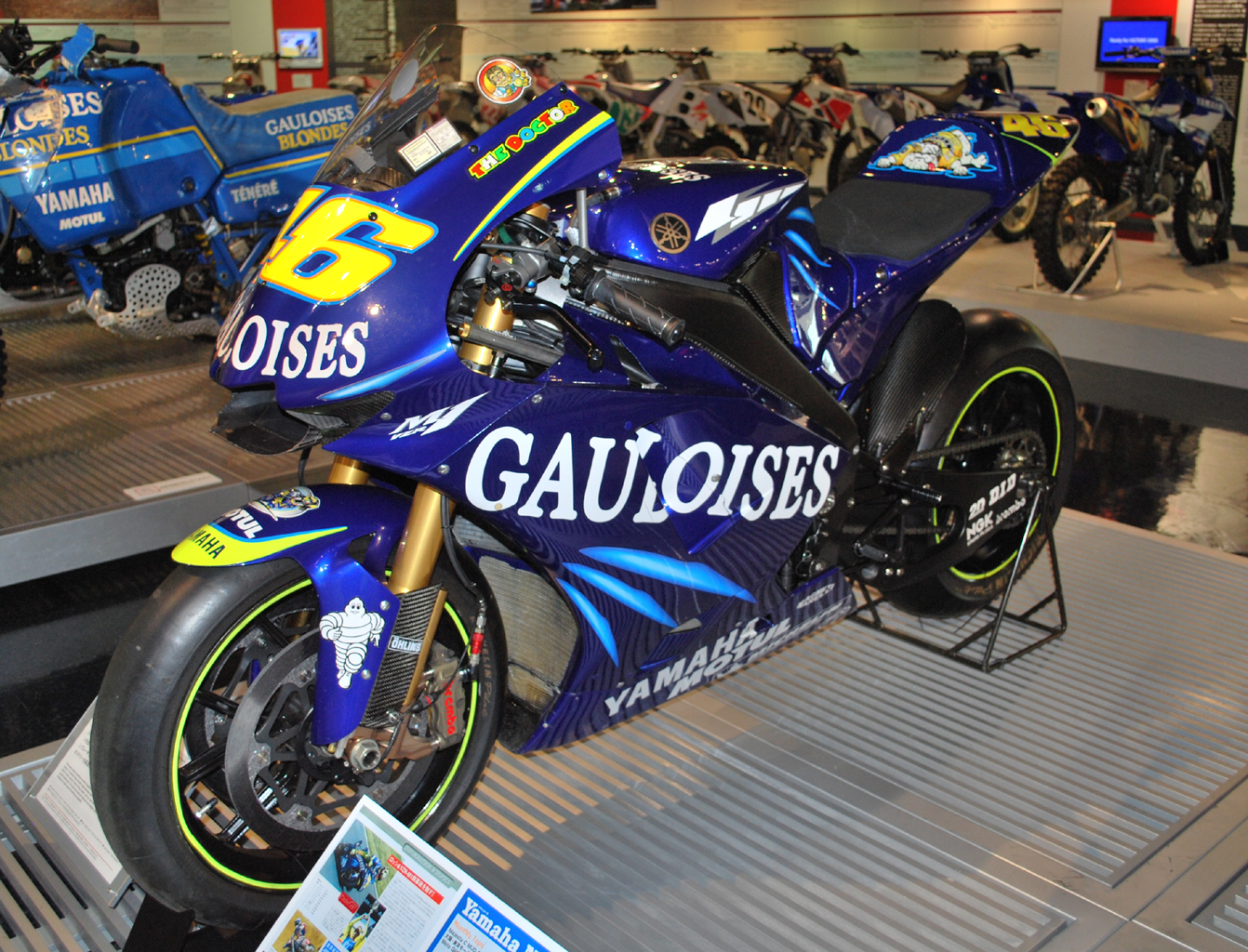
The Yamaha YZR-M1 of Valentino Rossi used in the 2004 Grand Prix motorcycle racing season on display

=== Auto sponsorship ===
Gauloises was the primary sponsor of the Équipe Ligier French Formula One team in 1996, replacing sister brand Gitanes, as well as its successor Alain Prost by Prost Grand Prix from 1997 until 2000. Gauloises also sponsored the Kronos Total Citroën World Rally Team Citroën Xsara WRC in World Rally Cars in the WRC during the 2006 World Rally Championship.

=== Moto sponsorship ===
Gauloises was the primary sponsor of the factory Yamaha team in 2004 and 2005, as well as the satellite Tech 3 team from 2001 until 2004 when they got sponsored by Fortuna in the MotoGP class. Gauloises was a major sponsor for teams in the Dakar Rally. Gauloises also sponsored various grand prix races on the MotoGP calendar, such as the Dutch TT, the Circuit de Barcelona-Catalunya and the Brno Circuit.

== Markets ==
Gauloises is mainly sold in France, but also was or still is sold in Algeria, Argentina, Australia, Austria, Belarus, Belgium, Canada, Croatia, Czech Republic, Denmark, Georgia, Germany, Greece, Hungary, Israel, Italy, Luxembourg, Madagascar, Mexico, Morocco, the Netherlands, Norway, Poland, Romania, Serbia, Slovenia, South Africa, Spain, Sweden, Switzerland, Syria, Thailand, Tunisia, Ukraine, and the United Arab Emirates.

Gauloises is no longer available in the United Kingdom or in Russia.

== See also ==
- List of cigarette brands
- Gitanes
- Smoking in France
- Tabac de Troupe at French Wikipedia fr:Tabac de troupe
