= Ducados =

Ducados may refer to:

- Duchy or dukedom and governed by a Duke or Duchess regnant
- A form of currency used in old Spain, a local version of the ducat
- Ducados, a brand of Spanish cigarette produced by the company Imperial Tobacco
