= Droits des Non-Fumeurs =

The Non-Smokers' Rights Association or Droits des Non-Fumeurs (DNF) is a non-governmental organization which has been working since 1973 to protect the rights of non-smokers in France. The DNF also works to ensure proper implementation of the Évin law.

The association has eight regional offices which provide information and help to those wanting information about tobacco control legislation. The DNF helps users in their efforts and answers their questions about France's tobacco legislation. Meanwhile, the DNF is also working on three major projects as part of the Cancer Plan, launched by the president in March 2003. On 17 December 2009, the DNF issued a report addressed to the Minister of Health and Sports regarding the growing tendency of smokers and establishment owners to flout the smoking law of 15 November 2006, which entered into effect 2 January 2008.

== See also ==
- Smoking in France
