= Yamaha Motor Racing =

Official Italian-Japanese factory team of Yamaha in MotoGP

Yamaha MotoGP Racing
- 2026 name: Monster Energy Yamaha MotoGP Team
- Base: Iwata, Shizuoka, Japan; Lesmo, Italy
- Principal: Massimo Meregalli
- Rider(s): MotoGP: 20. Fabio Quartararo; 42. Álex Rins; 4. Andrea Dovizioso (test rider); 7. Augusto Fernández (test rider)
- Motorcycle: Yamaha YZR-M1; Yamaha YZR500 (to 2002)
- Tyres: Michelin
- Riders' Championships: 16; 1975 - Giacomo Agostini; 1980 - Kenny Roberts; 1984, 1986, 1988 - Eddie Lawson; 1990, 1991, 1992 - Wayne Rainey; 2004, 2005, 2008, 2009 - Valentino Rossi; 2010, 2012, 2015 - Jorge Lorenzo; 2021 - Fabio Quartararo
- Teams' Championships: 7; 2004, 2005, 2008, 2009, 2010, 2015, 2016

Yamaha MotoGP Racing or Yamaha Factory Racing is the official Italian-Japanese factory team of Yamaha in MotoGP, currently competing as Monster Energy Yamaha MotoGP Team.

== History ==
The team was founded in 1999 following the retirement of Wayne Rainey, who had run a factory-supported team in the 500 cc class for the previous two years, with Kenny Roberts and Giacomo Agostini having run their own works supported teams before him.

The team was originally based in the Netherlands but was relocated in Italy in 2002.

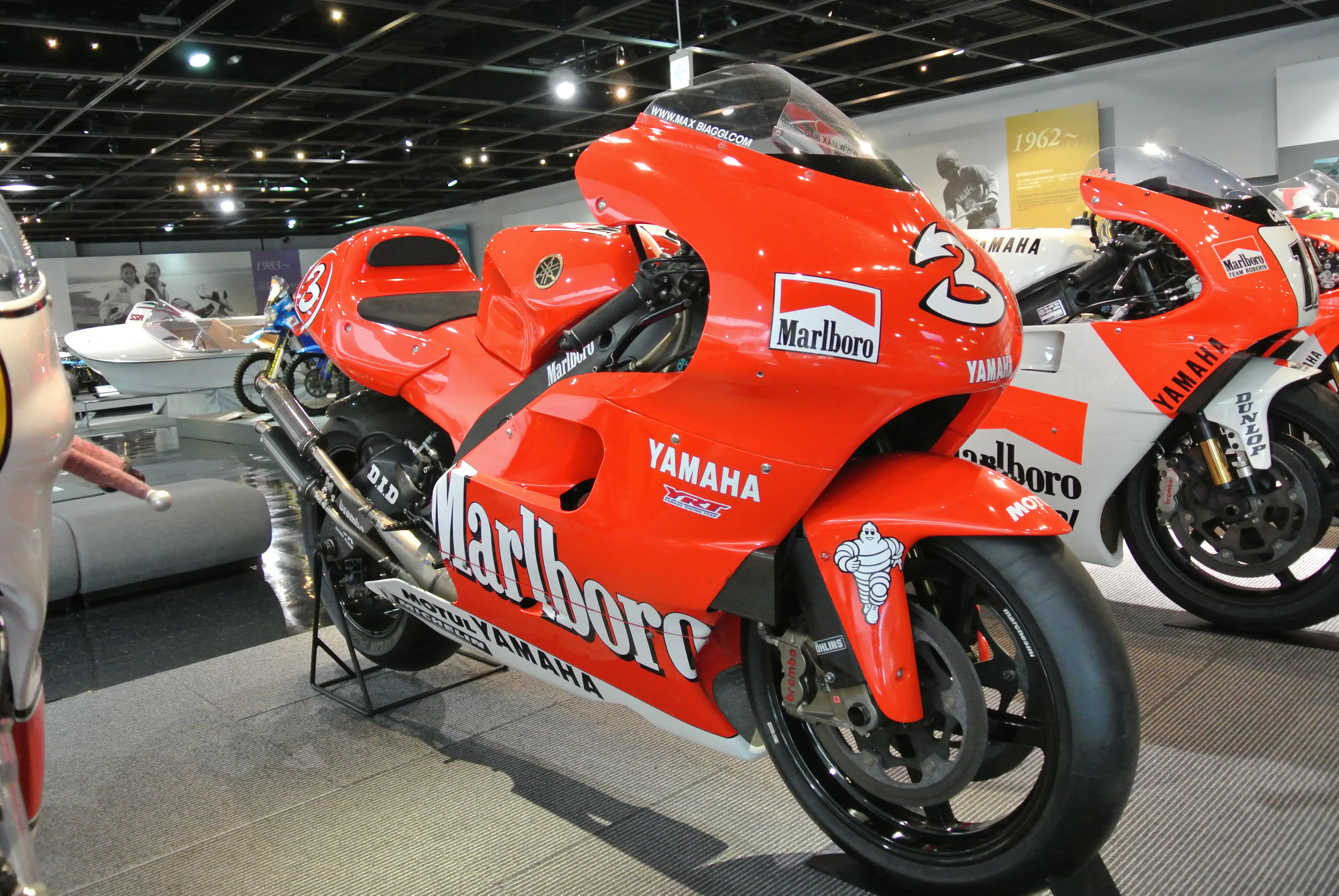
Yamaha YZR500 ridden by Max Biaggi in the 2001 season

=== The early years ===
Max Biaggi and Carlos Checa raced for the team from 1999 to 2002.

Biaggi achieved a total of 8 race wins in that period, first riding the Yamaha YZR500 and later the Yamaha YZR-M1 in 2002.

In 2003, Checa was joined by Marco Melandri. The team had an average season with no podium finishes.

=== The VR46 era ===
For 2004, Valentino Rossi joined Checa at the team. Rossi got 9 wins and won the championship.

Colin Edwards joined the team for 2005, when Rossi once again won the championship, collecting 11 wins.

Rossi and Edwards stayed with the team for 2006. Rossi earned 5 wins and finished 2nd in the championship.

For the 2007 season, both riders remained with the team riding the new 800cc Yamaha YZR-M1. Rossi had 4 wins and finished the season 3rd overall.

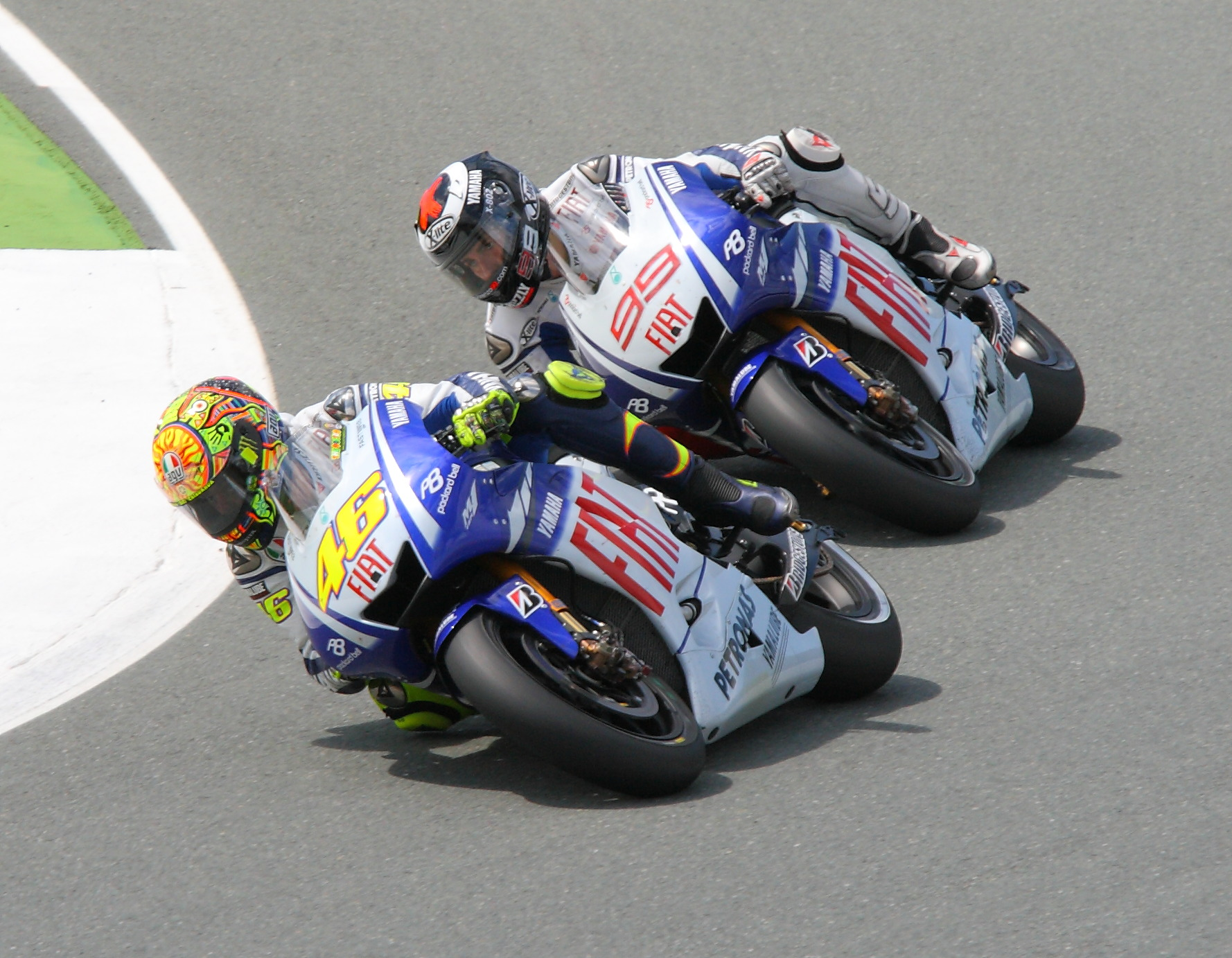
Valentino Rossi leading Jorge Lorenzo at the 2009 German Grand Prix

==== The Rossi-Lorenzo pair ====
For 2008, Yamaha had a unique line-up with Rossi being joined in the team by Jorge Lorenzo. Although the pair were fighting for the title from different pit boxes (as Rossi chose to use Bridgestone tyres and as Lorenzo continued with Michelin), Yamaha operated as one team and not two separate entities.

The title was won dominantly by Rossi who won 9 of the 18 races and finished on the podium in every race except for two.

Even though this was the learning year for Lorenzo, he was able to cruise to victory at Estoril and finished 4th in the championship.

In 2009, Yamaha dominated MotoGP with Rossi winning the title and Lorenzo finishing second.

The pair won 12 out of the 17 races, and Yamaha won the Constructors' Championship.

After seven years with Yamaha, Rossi left the team to compete with Ducati for the 2011 and 2012 seasons.

==== Rossi's second stint ====
He rejoined Yamaha again for the 2013 MotoGP season.

=== Titles after Rossi ===
They won the 2015 Championship with Jorge Lorenzo before going on a 6 year wait for their next world championship title with Fabio Quartararo.

=== The V4 engine era ===
Yamaha fielded a total of 5 bikes in the private test in Brno Circuit and one of them was the V4 engine tested by Andrea Dovizioso. This was the first time the Italian test rider had tested the new engine and underwent a fairly closed test on the circuit that had just been resurfaced on 1 and 2 July 2025. Dovi was not allowed to comment on his experience. In addition, it is not certain from the time records which bike the 39-year-old rider tested because all of them were recorded as Yamaha test bikes.

The V4 will make its full debut in 2026 with all 4 (Factory and Pramac Racing) Yamaha bikes set to use the V4 Spec.

On June 30 2026 it was announced that both Fabio Quartararo and Alex Rins would depart the team at the end of the 2026 season. A day later on July 1 it was announced that Yamaha had signed 2024 World Champion Jorge Martín and Ai Ogura from the Aprilia stable to ride for the team from 2027.

== Grand Prix motorcycle results ==
(key) (Races in bold indicate pole position; races in italics indicate fastest lap)

Year	Bike	Team	No.	Riders	Race																Riders' standings		Manufacturers' standings	
Year	Bike	Team	No.	Riders	1	2	3	4	5	6	7	8	9	10	11	12	13	14	15	16	Pts	Pos	Pts	Pos
1999	Yamaha YZR500	Marlboro Yamaha Team			MAL	JPN	ESP	FRA	ITA	CAT	NED	GBR	GER	CZE	IMO	VAL	AUS	RSA	RIO	AUS				
1999	Yamaha YZR500	Marlboro Yamaha Team	2	(Italy) Max Biaggi	Ret	9	2	**Ret**	2	Ret	5	4	Ret	4	3	7	2	1	2	2	194	4th	280	2nd
1999	Yamaha YZR500	Marlboro Yamaha Team	4	(Spain) Carlos Checa	2	6	10	5	7	7	Ret	Ret	4	Ret	Ret	5	4	6	Ret	4	125	7th	280	2nd
2000	Yamaha YZR500	Marlboro Yamaha Team			RSA	MAL	JPN	ESP	FRA	ITA	CAT	NED	GBR	GER	CZE	POR	VAL	RIO	PAC	AUS				
2000	Yamaha YZR500	Marlboro Yamaha Team	4	(Italy) Max Biaggi	Ret	4	Ret	**Ret**	**Ret**	9	5	4	9	4	**1**	4	3	**5**	**3**	1	170	3rd	318	1st
2000	Yamaha YZR500	Marlboro Yamaha Team	7	(Spain) Carlos Checa	2	2	5	2	7	2	Ret	5	11	9	11	12	7	15	4	Ret	155	6th	318	1st
2001	Yamaha YZR500	Marlboro Yamaha Team			JPN	RSA	ESP	FRA	ITA	CAT	NED	GBR	GER	CZE	POR	VAL	PAC	AUS	MAL	RIO				
2001	Yamaha YZR500	Marlboro Yamaha Team	3	(Italy) Max Biaggi	3	8	11	**1**	3	2	1	**2**	**1**	**10**	**5**	**10**	Ret	**2**	Ret	3	219	2nd	295	2nd
2001	Yamaha YZR500	Marlboro Yamaha Team	7	(Spain) Carlos Checa	10		14	2	Ret	8	Ret	5	2	7	4	4	7	16	10	2	137	6th	295	2nd

== MotoGP results ==
=== By rider ===
Year	Class	Team name	Bike	No.	Riders	Races	Wins	Podiums	Poles	F. laps	Points	Pos.
2022	MotoGP	Monster Energy Yamaha MotoGP	Yamaha YZR-M1	20	(France) Fabio Quartararo	20	3	8	1	4	248	2nd
2022	MotoGP	Monster Energy Yamaha MotoGP	Yamaha YZR-M1	21	(Italy) Franco Morbidelli	20	0	0	0	0	42	19th
2023	MotoGP	Monster Energy Yamaha MotoGP	Yamaha YZR-M1	20	(France) Fabio Quartararo	20	0	3	0	0	172	10th
2023	MotoGP	Monster Energy Yamaha MotoGP	Yamaha YZR-M1	21	(Italy) Franco Morbidelli	20	0	0	0	0	102	13th
2024	MotoGP	Monster Energy Yamaha MotoGP	Yamaha YZR-M1	20	(France) Fabio Quartararo	20	0	0	0	0	113	13th
2024	MotoGP	Monster Energy Yamaha MotoGP	Yamaha YZR-M1	42	(Spain) Álex Rins	17	0	0	0	0	31	18th
2024	MotoGP	Monster Energy Yamaha MotoGP	Yamaha YZR-M1	87	(Australia) Remy Gardner	2	0	0	0	0	0	26th
2025	MotoGP	Monster Energy Yamaha MotoGP	Yamaha YZR-M1	20	(France) Fabio Quartararo	22	0	1	5	0	201	9th
2025	MotoGP	Monster Energy Yamaha MotoGP	Yamaha YZR-M1	42	(Spain) Álex Rins	22	0	0	0	0	68	19th
2026	MotoGP	Monster Energy Yamaha MotoGP	Yamaha YZR-M1	20	(France) Fabio Quartararo	18	0	0	0	0	79*	14th*
2026	MotoGP	Monster Energy Yamaha MotoGP	Yamaha YZR-M1	42	(Spain) Álex Rins	18	0	0	0	0	29*	20th*

=== By year ===
(key) (Races in bold indicate pole position; races in italics indicate fastest lap)

Year	Bike	Team	Tyres	No.	Riders	1	2	3	4	5	6	7	8	9	10	11	12	13	14	15	16	17	18	19	20	21	22	Points	RC	Points	TC	Points	MC
2002	Yamaha YZR-M1	Marlboro Yamaha Team	M			JPN	SAF	ESP	FRA	ITA	CAT	NED	GBR	GER	CZE	POR	RIO	PAC	MAL	AUS	VAL												
2002	Yamaha YZR-M1	Marlboro Yamaha Team	M	3	(Italy) Max Biaggi	Ret	9	DSQ	3	2	**4**	4	2	2	**1**	6	**2**	Ret	1	6	**3**							215	2nd	356	2nd	272	2nd
2002	Yamaha YZR-M1	Marlboro Yamaha Team	M	7	(Spain) Carlos Checa	3	5	Ret	Ret	4	3	3	Ret	4	5	**2**	Ret	5	7	11	Ret							141	5th	356	2nd	272	2nd
2003	Yamaha YZR-M1	Fortuna Yamaha Team	M			JPN	SAF	ESP	FRA	ITA	CAT	NED	GBR	GER	CZE	POR	RIO	PAC	MAL	AUS	VAL												
2003	Yamaha YZR-M1	Fortuna Yamaha Team	M	7	(Spain) Carlos Checa	10	9	Ret	Ret	8	4	4	6	8	4	8	9	Ret	5	8	5							123	7th	188	5th	175	3rd
2003	Yamaha YZR-M1	Fortuna Yamaha Team	M	17	(Japan) Norifumi Abe	11	8														9							20 (31) (Note: Non-bracketed number refers to the number accumulated with the motorcycle, with number in brackets referring to the total accumulated for the season.)	16th	188	5th	175	3rd
2003	Yamaha YZR-M1	Fortuna Yamaha Team	M	33	(Italy) Marco Melandri			17	15	11	13	Ret	Ret	Ret	10	7	11	5	11	Ret								45	15th	188	5th	175	3rd
2004	Yamaha YZR-M1	Gauloises Fortuna Yamaha	M			SAF	ESP	FRA	ITA	CAT	NED	RIO	GER	GBR	CZE	POR	JPN	QAT	MAL	AUS	VAL												
2004	Yamaha YZR-M1	Gauloises Fortuna Yamaha	M	7	(Spain) Carlos Checa	10	6	2	Ret	4	9	10	Ret	6	6	5	7	**Ret**	9	10	14							117	7th	421	1st	328	2nd
2004	Yamaha YZR-M1	Gauloises Fortuna Yamaha	M	46	(Italy) Valentino Rossi	**1**	**4**	4	1	1	**1**	Ret	4	**1**	2	1	2	Ret	**1**	1	1							304	1st	421	1st	328	2nd
2005	Yamaha YZR-M1	Gauloises Fortuna Yamaha	M			ESP	POR	CHN	FRA	ITA	CAT	NED	USA	GBR	GER	CZE	JPN	MAL	QAT	AUS	TUR	VAL											
2005	Yamaha YZR-M1	Gauloises Fortuna Yamaha	M	5	(United States) Colin Edwards	9	6	8	3	9	7	3	2	4	8	7	6	10	4	6	7	8						179	4th	546	1st	381	1st
2005	Yamaha YZR-M1	Gauloises Fortuna Yamaha	M	46	(Italy) Valentino Rossi	**1**	2	1	**1**	**1**	1	**1**	3	**1**	1	1	Ret	2	1	1	2	3						367	1st	546	1st	381	1st
2006	Yamaha YZR-M1	Camel Yamaha Team	M			ESP	QAT	TUR	CHN	FRA	ITA	CAT	NED	GBR	GER	USA	CZE	MAL	AUS	JPN	POR	VAL											
2006	Yamaha YZR-M1	Camel Yamaha Team	M	5	(United States) Colin Edwards	11	9	9	3	6	12	5	13	6	12	9	10	10	Ret	8	4	9						124	7th	371	2nd	289	2nd
2006	Yamaha YZR-M1	Camel Yamaha Team	M	46	(Italy) Valentino Rossi	14	1	4	Ret	Ret	1	**1**	8	2	1	Ret	**2**	**1**	3	2	**2**	**13**						247	2nd	371	2nd	289	2nd
2007	Yamaha YZR-M1	Fiat Yamaha Team	M			QAT	ESP	TUR	CHN	FRA	ITA	CAT	GBR	NED	GER	USA	CZE	RSM	POR	JPN	AUS	MAL	VAL										
2007	Yamaha YZR-M1	Fiat Yamaha Team	M	5	(United States) Colin Edwards	6	3	Ret	11	**12**	12	10	**2**	6	4	11	Ret	9	10	14	9	10	13					124	9th	365	4th	283	3rd
2007	Yamaha YZR-M1	Fiat Yamaha Team	M	46	(Italy) Valentino Rossi	**2**	1	**10**	**2**	6	1	**2**	4	1	Ret	4	7	Ret	1	13	3	5	Ret					241	3rd	365	4th	283	3rd
2008	Yamaha YZR-M1	Fiat Yamaha Team				QAT	ESP	POR	CHN	FRA	ITA	CAT	GBR	NED	GER	USA	CZE	RSM	IND	JPN	AUS	MAL	VAL										
2008	Yamaha YZR-M1	Fiat Yamaha Team	B	46	(Italy) Valentino Rossi	5	2	3	1	1	**1**	2	2	11	2	1	1	1	**1**	1	2	1	3					373	1st	563	1st	402	1st
2008	Yamaha YZR-M1	Fiat Yamaha Team	M	48	(Spain) Jorge Lorenzo	**2**	**3**	**1**	4	2	Ret	WD	6	6	Ret	Ret	10	2	3	**4**	4	Ret	8					190	4th	563	1st	402	1st
2009	Yamaha YZR-M1	Fiat Yamaha Team	B			QAT	JPN	ESP	FRA	ITA	CAT	NED	USA	GER	GBR	CZE	IND	RSM	POR	AUS	MAL	VAL											
2009	Yamaha YZR-M1	Fiat Yamaha Team	B	46	(Italy) Valentino Rossi	2	**2**	1	16	3	1	**1**	2	**1**	**5**	**1**	Ret	**1**	4	2	**3**	2						306	1st	567	1st	386	1st
2009	Yamaha YZR-M1	Fiat Yamaha Team	B	99	(Spain) Jorge Lorenzo	3	1	**Ret**	1	**2**	**2**	2	**3**	2	Ret	Ret	1	2	**1**	Ret	4	3						261	2nd	567	1st	386	1st
2010	Yamaha YZR-M1	Fiat Yamaha Team	B			QAT	ESP	FRA	ITA	GBR	NED	CAT	GER	USA	CZE	IND	RSM	ARA	JPN	MAL	AUS	POR	VAL										
2010	Yamaha YZR-M1	Fiat Yamaha Team	B	8	(Japan) Wataru Yoshikawa							15																1	22nd	617	1st	404	1st
2010	Yamaha YZR-M1	Fiat Yamaha Team	B	46	(Italy) Valentino Rossi	1	3	**2**	DNS				4	3	5	4	3	6	3	1	3	2	3					**233**	**3rd**	617	1st	404	1st
2010	Yamaha YZR-M1	Fiat Yamaha Team	B	99	(Spain) Jorge Lorenzo	2	1	1	2	**1**	**1**	**1**	**2**	**1**	1	3	2	4	4	**3**	2	**1**	1					**383**	**1st**	617	1st	404	1st
2011	Yamaha YZR-M1	Yamaha Factory Racing	B			QAT	ESP	POR	FRA	CAT	GBR	NED	ITA	GER	USA	CZE	IND	RSM	ARA	JPN	AUS	MAL	VAL										
2011	Yamaha YZR-M1	Yamaha Factory Racing	B	1	(Spain) Jorge Lorenzo	2	1	**2**	4	2	Ret	6	1	2	**2**	4	4	1	3	2	DNS	C						260	2nd	446	2nd	325	2nd
2011	Yamaha YZR-M1	Yamaha Factory Racing	B	11	(United States) Ben Spies	6	Ret	Ret	6	3	Ret	1	4	5	4	5	3	6	5	6	DNS	C	2					176	5th	446	2nd	325	2nd
2011	Yamaha YZR-M1	Yamaha Factory Racing	B	89	(Japan) Katsuyuki Nakasuga																		10					10	18th	446	2nd	325	2nd
2012	Yamaha YZR-M1	Yamaha Factory Racing	B			QAT	ESP	POR	FRA	CAT	GBR	NED	GER	ITA	USA	IND	CZE	RSM	ARA	JPN	MAL	AUS	VAL										
2012	Yamaha YZR-M1	Yamaha Factory Racing	B	11	(United States) Ben Spies	11	11	8	16	10	5	4	4	11	Ret	Ret	Ret	5	5	Ret	Ret							88	10th	458	2nd	386	2nd
2012	Yamaha YZR-M1	Yamaha Factory Racing	B	21	(Japan) Katsuyuki Nakasuga																		2					20 (27)	18th	458	2nd	386	2nd
2012	Yamaha YZR-M1	Yamaha Factory Racing	B	99	(Spain) Jorge Lorenzo	**1**	**2**	2	1	1	1	Ret	2	1	**2**	2	**2**	1	**2**	**2**	**2**	2	Ret					350	1st	458	2nd	386	2nd
2013	Yamaha YZR-M1	Yamaha Factory Racing	B			QAT	AME	ESP	FRA	ITA	CAT	NED	GER	USA	IND	CZE	GBR	RSM	ARA	MAL	AUS	JPN	VAL										
2013	Yamaha YZR-M1	Yamaha Factory Racing	B	46	(Italy) Valentino Rossi	2	6	4	12	Ret	4	1	3	3	4	4	4	4	3	4	3	6	4					237	4th	567	2nd	381	2nd
2013	Yamaha YZR-M1	Yamaha Factory Racing	B	99	(Spain) Jorge Lorenzo	**1**	3	**3**	7	1	1	5	DNS	6	3	3	1	1	2	3	**1**	**1**	**1**					330	2nd	567	2nd	381	2nd
2014	Yamaha YZR-M1	Movistar Yamaha MotoGP	B			QAT	AME	ARG	ESP	FRA	ITA	CAT	NED	GER	USA	CZE	GBR	RSM	ARA	JPN	AUS	MAL	VAL										
2014	Yamaha YZR-M1	Movistar Yamaha MotoGP	B	46	(Italy) Valentino Rossi	2	8	4	2	2	3	2	5	4	3	3	3	1	Ret	3	1	2	**2**					295	2nd	558	2nd	354	2nd
2014	Yamaha YZR-M1	Movistar Yamaha MotoGP	B	99	(Spain) Jorge Lorenzo	Ret	10	3	4	6	2	4	13	3	2	2	2	**2**	1	1	2	3	Ret					263	3rd	558	2nd	354	2nd
2015	Yamaha YZR-M1	Movistar Yamaha MotoGP	B			QAT	AME	ARG	ESP	FRA	ITA	CAT	NED	GER	USA	CZE	GBR	RSM	ARA	JPN	AUS	MAL	VAL										
2015	Yamaha YZR-M1	Movistar Yamaha MotoGP	B	46	(Italy) Valentino Rossi	1	3	1	3	2	3	2	**1**	3	3	3	1	5	3	2	4	3	4					325	2nd	655	1st	407	1st
2015	Yamaha YZR-M1	Movistar Yamaha MotoGP	B	99	(Spain) Jorge Lorenzo	4	4	5	**1**	1	1	1	3	4	2	**1**	4	**Ret**	1	**3**	2	2	**1**					330	1st	655	1st	407	1st
2016	Yamaha YZR-M1	Movistar Yamaha MotoGP	M			QAT	ARG	AME	SPA	FRA	ITA	CAT	NED	GER	AUT	CZE	GBR	RSM	ARA	JPN	AUS	MAL	VAL										
2016	Yamaha YZR-M1	Movistar Yamaha MotoGP	M	46	(Italy) Valentino Rossi	4	2	Ret	**1**	2	**Ret**	1	Ret	8	4	2	3	2	3	**Ret**	2	2	4					249	2nd	482	1st	353	2nd
2016	Yamaha YZR-M1	Movistar Yamaha MotoGP	M	99	(Spain) Jorge Lorenzo	**1**	Ret	2	2	**1**	1	Ret	10	15	3	17	8	**3**	2	Ret	6	3	**1**					233	3rd	482	1st	353	2nd
2017	Yamaha YZR-M1	Movistar Yamaha MotoGP	M			QAT	ARG	AME	SPA	FRA	ITA	CAT	NED	GER	CZE	AUT	GBR	RSM	ARA	JPN	AUS	MAL	VAL										
2017	Yamaha YZR-M1	Movistar Yamaha MotoGP	M	25	(Spain) Maverick Viñales	**1**	1	Ret	6	**1**	**2**	10	Ret	4	3	6	2	4	4	9	3	9	12					230	3rd	438	2nd	321	2nd
2017	Yamaha YZR-M1	Movistar Yamaha MotoGP	M	46	(Italy) Valentino Rossi	3	2	2	10	Ret	4	8	1	5	4	7	3		5	Ret	2	7	5					208	5th	438	2nd	321	2nd
2018	Yamaha YZR-M1	Movistar Yamaha MotoGP	M			QAT	ARG	AME	SPA	FRA	ITA	CAT	NED	GER	CZE	AUT	GBR	RSM	ARA	THA	JPN	AUS	MAL	VAL									
2018	Yamaha YZR-M1	Movistar Yamaha MotoGP	M	25	(Spain) Maverick Viñales	6	5	2	7	7	8	6	3	3	Ret	12	C	5	10	3	7	1	4	**Ret**				193	4th	391	3rd	281	3rd
2018	Yamaha YZR-M1	Movistar Yamaha MotoGP	M	46	(Italy) Valentino Rossi	3	19	4	5	3	**3**	3	5	2	4	6	C	7	8	4	4	6	18	13				198	3rd	391	3rd	281	3rd
2019	Yamaha YZR-M1	Monster Energy Yamaha MotoGP	M			QAT	ARG	AME	SPA	FRA	ITA	CAT	NED	GER	CZE	AUT	GBR	RSM	ARA	THA	JPN	AUS	MAL	VAL									
2019	Yamaha YZR-M1	Monster Energy Yamaha MotoGP	M	12	(Spain) Maverick Viñales	**7**	Ret	11	3	Ret	6	Ret	1	2	10	5	3	**3**	4	3	4	**Ret**	1	6				211	3rd	385	3rd	321	2nd
2019	Yamaha YZR-M1	Monster Energy Yamaha MotoGP	M	46	(Italy) Valentino Rossi	5	2	2	6	5	Ret	Ret	Ret	8	6	4	4	4	8	8	Ret	8	4	8				174	7th	385	3rd	321	2nd
2020	Yamaha YZR-M1	Monster Energy Yamaha MotoGP	M			SPA	ANC	CZE	AUT	STY	RSM	EMI	CAT	FRA	ARA	TER	EUR	VAL	POR														
2020	Yamaha YZR-M1	Monster Energy Yamaha MotoGP	M	12	(Spain) Maverick Viñales	2	2	14	**10**	Ret	**6**	**1**	9	10	4	7	13	10	11									132	6th	178 (Note: Monster Energy Yamaha MotoGP riders scored 198 points, but the team was deducted 20 points after failing to respect MSMA technical changes protocols.)	6th	204 (Note: Yamaha scored 254 points as a manufacturer, but were deducted 50 points after failing to respect MSMA technical changes protocols.)	2nd
2020	Yamaha YZR-M1	Monster Energy Yamaha MotoGP	M	31	(United States) Garrett Gerloff												WD (Note: Garrett Gerloff initially replaced Valentino Rossi during round 12 and competed in the two Friday practice sessions while Rossi was waiting for his COVID-19 test results, but was withdrawn from the race when Rossi was declared fit to race after testing negative for COVID-19.)											0	NC	178	6th	204	2nd
2020	Yamaha YZR-M1	Monster Energy Yamaha MotoGP	M	46	(Italy) Valentino Rossi	Ret	3	5	5	9	4	Ret	Ret	Ret			Ret	12	12									66	15th	178	6th	204	2nd
2021	Yamaha YZR-M1	Monster Energy Yamaha MotoGP	M			QAT	DOH	POR	SPA	FRA	ITA	CAT	GER	NED	STY	AUT	GBR	ARA	RSM	AME	EMI	ALR	VAL										
2021	Yamaha YZR-M1	Monster Energy Yamaha MotoGP	M	12	(Spain) Maverick Viñales	1	5	11	7	10	8	5	19	**2**	NC													95 (106)	10th	380	2nd	309	2nd
2021	Yamaha YZR-M1	Monster Energy Yamaha MotoGP	M	20	(France) Fabio Quartararo	5	1	**1**	**13**	**3**	**1**	**6**	3	1	3	7	1	8	2	2	4	Ret	5					278	1st	380	2nd	309	2nd
2021	Yamaha YZR-M1	Monster Energy Yamaha MotoGP	M	21	(Italy) Franco Morbidelli														18	19	14	17	11					7 (47)	17th	380	2nd	309	2nd
2021	Yamaha YZR-M1	Monster Energy Yamaha MotoGP	M	35	(United Kingdom) Cal Crutchlow												17	16										0 (0)	28th	380	2nd	309	2nd
2022	Yamaha YZR-M1	Monster Energy Yamaha MotoGP	M			QAT	INA	ARG	AME	POR	SPA	FRA	ITA	CAT	GER	NED	GBR	AUT	RSM	ARA	JPN	THA	AUS	MAL	VAL								
2022	Yamaha YZR-M1	Monster Energy Yamaha MotoGP	M	20	(France) Fabio Quartararo	9	**2**	8	7	**1**	**2**	4	2	**1**	**1**	Ret	8	2	5	Ret	8	17	Ret	3	4			248	2nd	290	5th	256	2nd
2022	Yamaha YZR-M1	Monster Energy Yamaha MotoGP	M	21	(Italy) Franco Morbidelli	11	7	Ret	16	13	15	15	17	13	13	Ret	15	Ret	Ret	17	14	13	Ret	11	14			42	19th	290	5th	256	2nd
2023	Yamaha YZR-M1	Monster Energy Yamaha MotoGP	M			POR	ARG	AME	SPA	FRA	ITA	GER	NED	GBR	AUT	CAT	RSM	IND	JPN	INA	AUS	THA	MAL	QAT	VAL								
2023	Yamaha YZR-M1	Monster Energy Yamaha MotoGP	M	20	(France) Fabio Quartararo	8	7^{9}	3	10	7	11	13	Ret^{3}	15	8	7	13	3^{6}	10	3^{5}	14	5	5	7	11			172	10th	274	7th	196	4th
2023	Yamaha YZR-M1	Monster Energy Yamaha MotoGP	M	21	(Italy) Franco Morbidelli	14	4^{4}	8	11	10	10	12	9	14	11^{9}	14	15	7	17	14	17	11	7	16	7			102	13th	274	7th	196	4th
2024	Yamaha YZR-M1	Monster Energy Yamaha MotoGP	M			QAT	POR	AME	SPA	FRA	CAT	ITA	NED	GER	GBR	AUT	CAT	RSM	EMI	INA	JPN	AUS	THA	MAL	SLD								
2024	Yamaha YZR-M1	Monster Energy Yamaha MotoGP	M	20	(France) Fabio Quartararo	11	7^{9}	12	15^{5}	Ret	9	18	12^{7}	11	11	18	Ret	7^{9}	7^{7}	7	12	9	16	6^{5}	11			113	13th	144	8th	124	4th
2024	Yamaha YZR-M1	Monster Energy Yamaha MotoGP	M	42	(Spain) Álex Rins	16	13	Ret	13	15	20	15	Ret		DNS	16	9	19	DNS	11	16	13	Ret	8	21			31	18th	144	8th	124	4th
2024	Yamaha YZR-M1	Monster Energy Yamaha MotoGP	M	87	(Australia) Remy Gardner									19	18													0	26th	144	8th	124	4th
2025	Yamaha YZR-M1	Monster Energy Yamaha MotoGP	M			THA	ARG	AME	QAT	SPA	FRA	GBR	ARA	ITA	NED	GER	CZE	AUT	HUN	CAT	RSM	JPN	INA	AUS	MAL	POR	VAL						
2025	Yamaha YZR-M1	Monster Energy Yamaha MotoGP	M	20	(France) Fabio Quartararo	15^{7}	14	10^{6}	7^{5}	**2**	**Ret**^{4}	**Ret**^{7}	Ret	14	**10**	4^{3}	6^{5}	15	10	5^{2}	8	8^{6}	7	**11**^{7}	5^{5}	6^{4}	Ret^{7}	201	9th	269	6th	247	5th
2025	Yamaha YZR-M1	Monster Energy Yamaha MotoGP	M	42	(Spain) Álex Rins	17	11	11	12	13	12^{8}	13	11	15	13	10	15	16	13	Ret	Ret	18	10	7	13	13	14	68	19th	269	6th	247	5th
2026	Yamaha YZR-M1	Monster Energy Yamaha MotoGP	M			THA	BRA	USA	SPA	FRA	CAT	ITA	HUN	CZE	NED	GER	GBR	ARA	RSM	AUT	JPN	INA	AUS	MAL	QAT	POR	VAL						
2026	Yamaha YZR-M1	Monster Energy Yamaha MotoGP	M	20	(France) Fabio Quartararo	14	16^{6}	17	14^{7}	6^{5}	5	18	Ret	Ret	8	7**^{9}**	16	18	10	17	12**^{9}**	9**^{9}**	C	11	DNA			79*	14th*	108*	10th*	105*	5th*
2026	Yamaha YZR-M1	Monster Energy Yamaha MotoGP	M	42	(Spain) Álex Rins	15	14	18	16	12	14	Ret	13	Ret	9	14	Ret	13	Ret	19	16	15	C	12	DNA			29*	20th*	108*	10th*	105*	5th*
2026	Yamaha YZR-M1	Monster Energy Yamaha MotoGP	M	47	(Spain) Augusto Fernández				20		12				15		15											6*	24th*	108*	10th*	105*	5th*

== See also ==
- Monster Energy Yamaha Factory
