= Fortuna (cigarette) =

Spanish cigarette brand

- Product type: Cigarette
- Current owner: Altadis, a subsidiary of Imperial Tobacco
- Country: Spain
- Introduced: 1974; 52 years ago
- Markets: See Markets
- Previous owners: Tabacalera

Fortuna is a Spanish brand of cigarettes, currently owned and manufactured by the Spanish company Altadis, a subsidiary of Imperial Tobacco. Fortuna is Spanish for “fortune” or “luck”.

== History ==
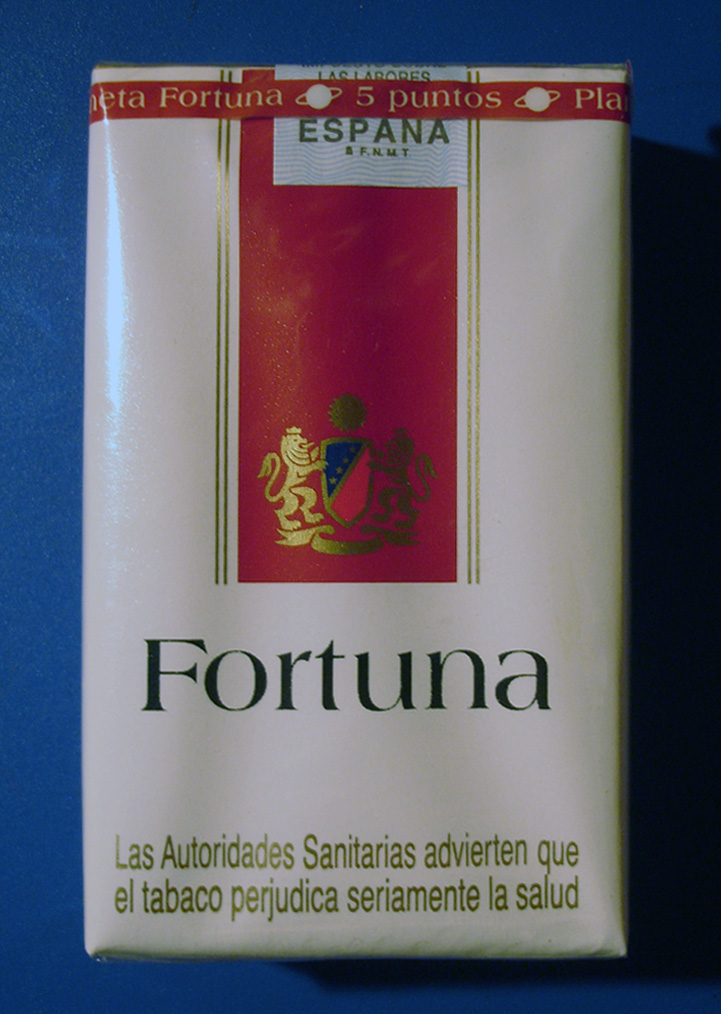
An old Spanish pack of Fortuna cigarettes, with a Spanish text warning at the bottom of the pack

Fortuna was first introduced in 1974 in Spain by Tabacalera, a Spanish tobacco conglomerate that is now half of the Altadis corporation. When Fortuna was launched in 1974, the market was dominated by black tobacco and the few international brands of blonde (light) cigarettes that were very expensive for the Spanish smoker. As a response to this, Tabacalera launched Fortuna cigarettes which were a type of blonde tobacco with a filter. With Fortuna came the first American blonde-flavored cigarette and in its first six months almost 700 million cigarettes were sold. Ten years later, it spread internationally, first in France, and then in countries like Italy, Morocco, and the United States. For more than thirty years, Fortuna has been sold in Spain on the blonde cigarette market. The tobacco mixture used in Fortuna cigarettes is of a Virginia type.

In April 2008, Altadis changed the pack design to a "new and modernized look" and reduced the number of its big pack cigarettes from 25 to 24, with the aim of setting a round price (which was €3,00 at the time). Altadis's primary rival is Philip Morris International.

In 2013, Fortuna was the fourth best-selling brand in Spain with more than 184,000,000 packs sold.

In 2015, the taxes of Fortuna, Ducados, and Nobel were once again increased from €4.40 to €4.45; an increase of 5 cents.

In December 2016, Altadis raised the price of their Fortuna, Ducados, and Nobel brands by 10 cents, while opting to keep their Fortuna soft pack brand at €4,45.

== Advertising ==
Tabacalera and Altadis made various poster and magazine advertisements in the 1980s, 1990s, and 2000s to promote the Fortuna brand.

Besides poster and magazine adverts, a few TV adverts were also made. Some were made for Spain, but also for other countries such as Venezuela.

A few telephone cards have also been made, featuring Fortuna adverting on them.

Other memorabilia that Tabacalera made during the time, includes lighters, calendars, and game cars, featuring Fortuna advertising.

== Sponsorship ==
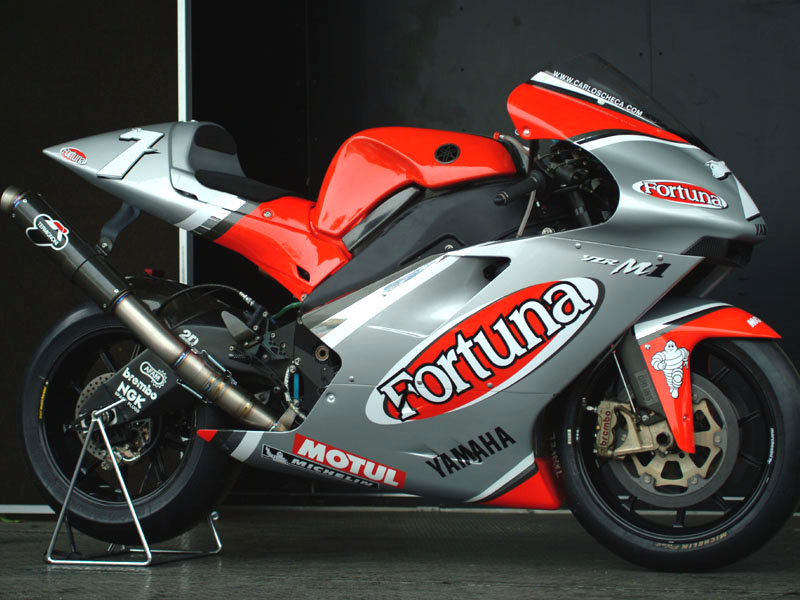
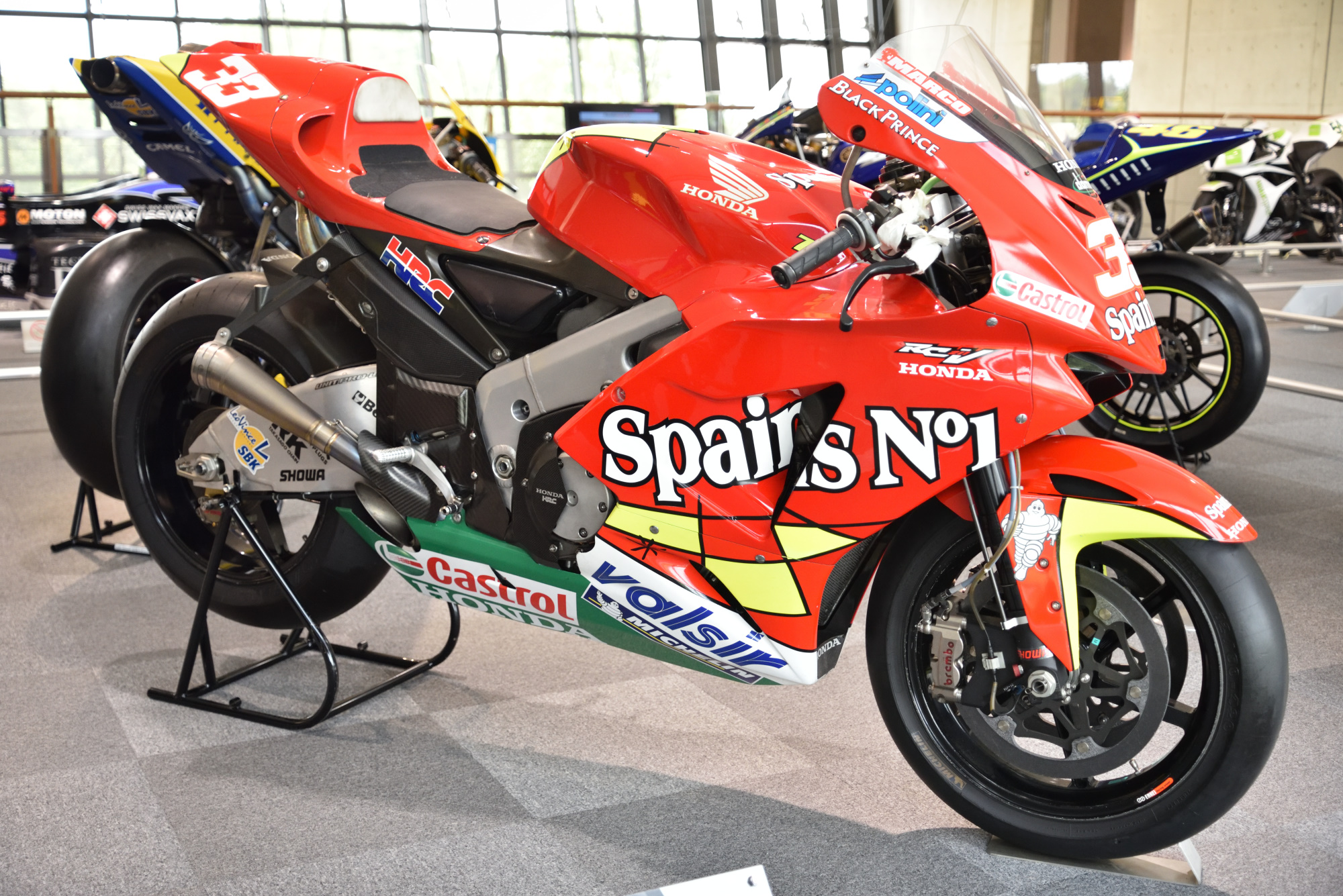
The 2003 Fortuna Yamaha YZR-M1, driven by Carlos Checa (pictured top) and the 2006 Fortuna Honda RC211V, driven by Marco Melandri with alternative livery

=== Grand prix motorcycle racing ===
Fortuna was a sponsor of various teams within the Grand Prix motorcycle racing classes. In races where anti-tobacco laws were in place (such as France and Germany) the Fortuna name was replaced with the "Spain's N°1" logo.

==== MotoGP ====
Fortuna sponsored the Pons Racing team in the 500cc class in 1995 and 1996.

Fortuna sponsored the Gresini Racing team in the MotoGP class in 2002 and 2006.

Fortuna sponsored the official Yamaha MotoGP team in the MotoGP class, along with Gauloises, from 2003 until 2005.

Fortuna sponsored the satellite Yamaha MotoGP Tech 3 team in the MotoGP class from 2003 until 2005.

==== 250cc ====
Fortuna sponsored the Gresini Racing team in the 250cc class in 2002 and 2003.

Fortuna sponsored the Honda team in the 250cc class in 2004 and 2005.

Fortuna sponsored the Aprilia Racing team in the 250cc class in 2006 and 2007.

=== Sportscar racing ===
Fortuna sponsored the Brun Motorsport team in the 1980s.

== Markets ==
Fortuna is mainly sold in Spain, but was or still is sold in Morocco, Italy, France, Austria, Poland, Romania, Russia, Venezuela, and Brazil. In the United States, Fortuna cigarettes are manufactured by Commonwealth Brands in Reidsville, North Carolina.

== See also ==
- Tobacco smoking
