= Tabacalera =

Spanish tobacco company

Tabacalera, S.A.
- Type: Sociedad Anónima
- Industry: Tobacco
- Founded: March 5, 1945
- Defunct: 1999
- Fate: Merged with SEITA
- Successor: Altadis
- Headquarters: Madrid, Spain
- Products: Ducados, Fortuna

Tabacalera was a Spanish tobacco company incorporated on March 5, 1945. The company was a trading company founded in 1945 by the Francoist government for tobacco and stamps; it is a successor of Compañía Arrendataria de Tabacos, which since 1887 managed the tobacco monopoly in Spain.

In 1999, the company merged with SEITA of France to form Altadis which was later purchased by Imperial Tobacco. Its brands included Ducados and Fortuna.

Tabacalera owned a 50% stake in Cuba's official cigar export operation Corporación Habanos.
