= SEITA =

French state-owned tobacco monopoly

SEITA (Société d'exploitation industrielle des tabacs et des allumettes), was the former French state-owned tobacco monopoly. Cigarette brands included Gauloises and Gitanes, both created in 1910.

By 1999, SEITA had become a private French company. It merged in 1999 with its Spanish equivalent, Tabacalera, to form Altadis and was subject to a competition merger review by the European Commission. Altadis was purchased bu Imperial Tobacco in 2008 for US$17 billion.

== See also ==
- Smoking in France
- Musée-Galerie de la Seita, a museum of tobacco-related objects
