= Vogue (cigarette) =

Cigarette brand

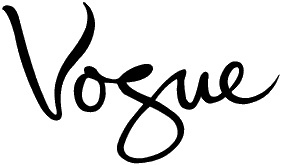

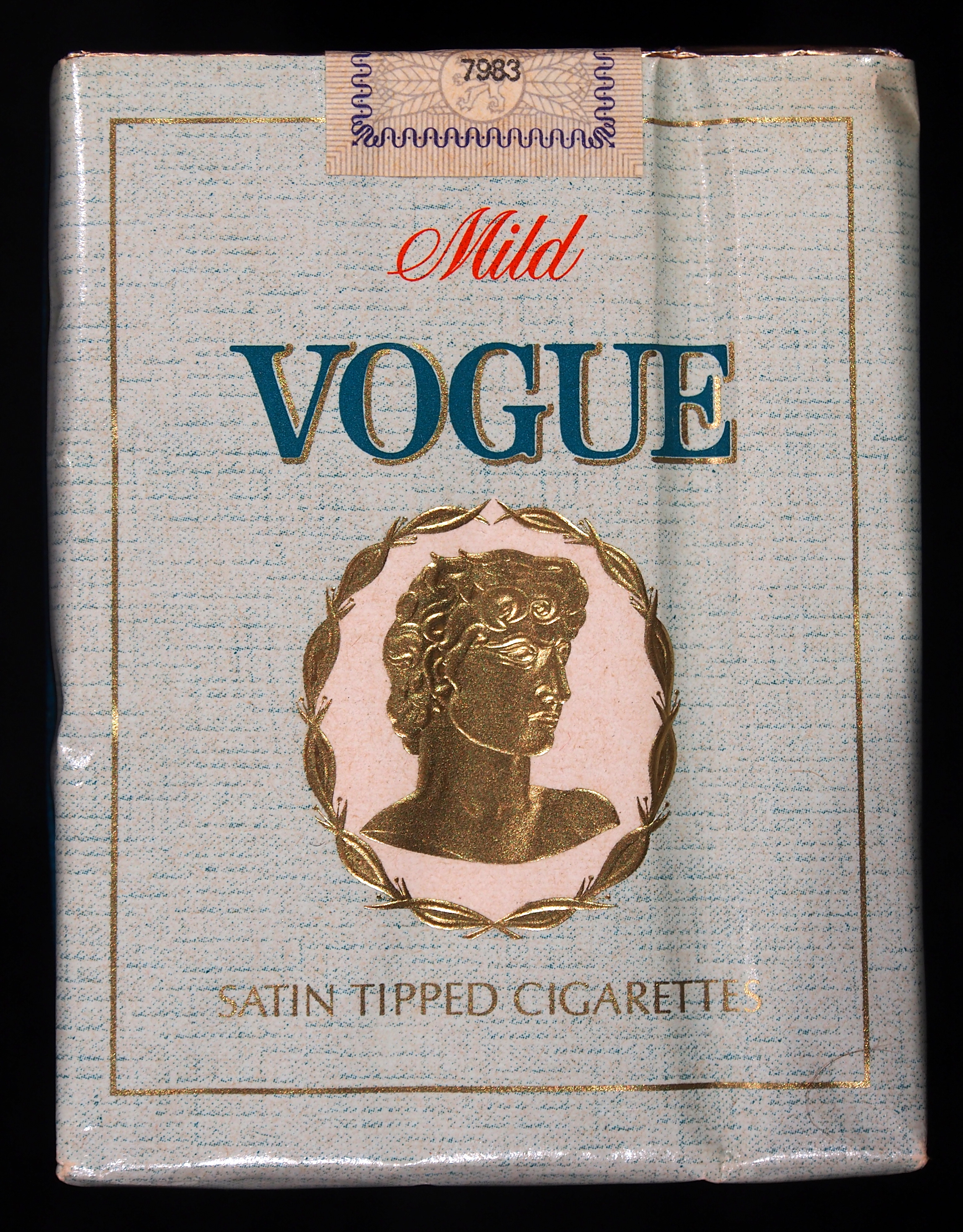
- Product type: Cigarette
- Produced by: British American Tobacco
- Introduced: 1955; 71 years ago
- Markets: See Markets

Vogue is a cigarette brand, currently owned and manufactured by British American Tobacco. Vogue is marketed primarily towards female customers as a means to improve physical appearance and appetite.

== History ==
Vogue’s “style” was based on the 1950s couture captured by Henry Clarke.

In 1999, the line of Vogue cigarettes emerged from an alliance of the British-American Tobacco Company with its British opponent Rothmans International companies. The "Vogue Superslims" and "Vogue Superslims Menthol" were launched in 1987.

In 2005, the Vogue Arome line was released, and it was in the European market until 2006. In March 2007, Vogue Blanche and Vogue Noire were launched.

The manufacturers announced an image renewal in August 2007.

== Markets ==
The brand is or was sold in countries like the United States, Brazil, Germany, France, Italy, Russia, South Africa, and many more countries.

== See also ==
- Fashion brands
- Smoking culture
