= Smoking in France =

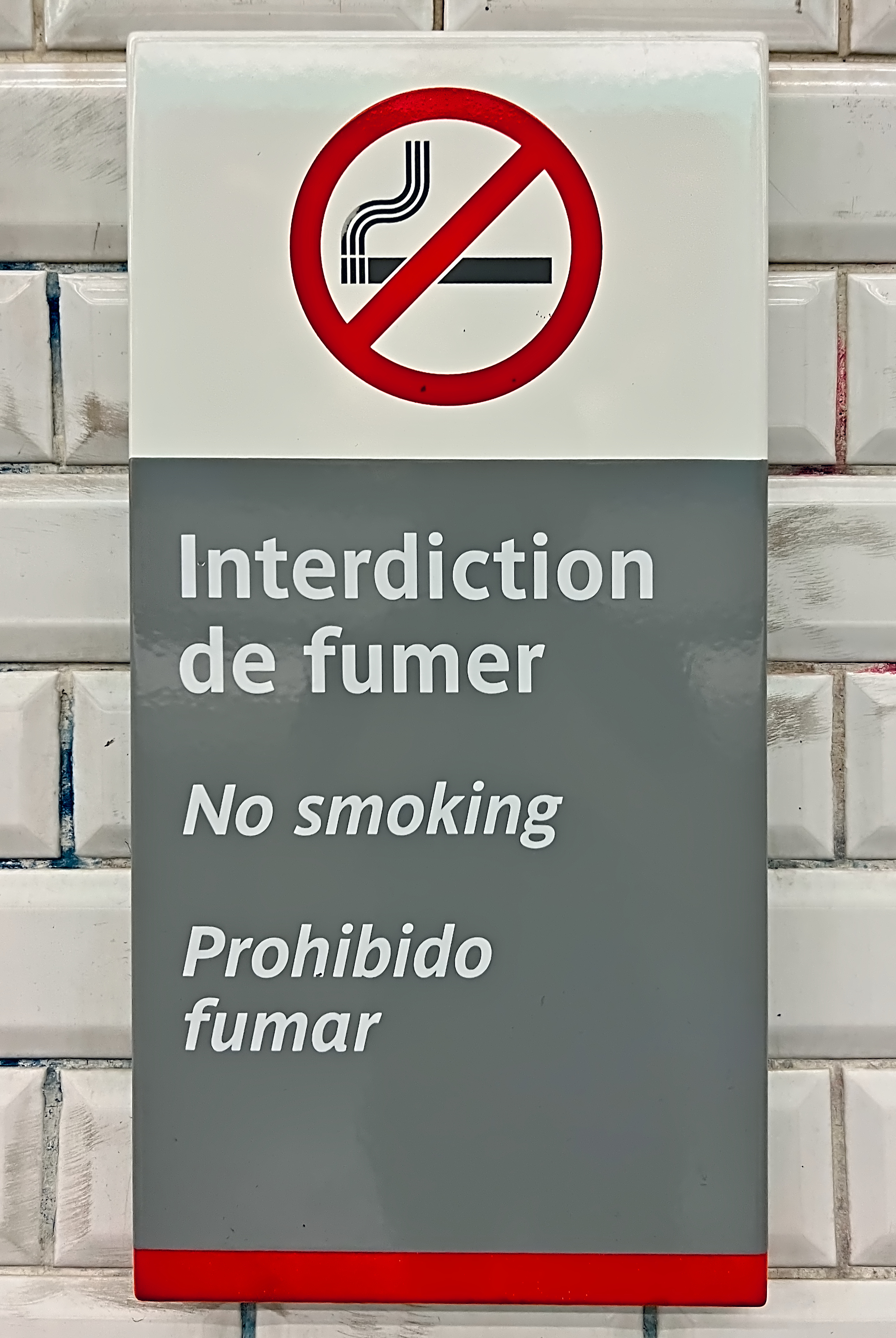
Smoking prohibition sign at a Paris Métro station (2022).

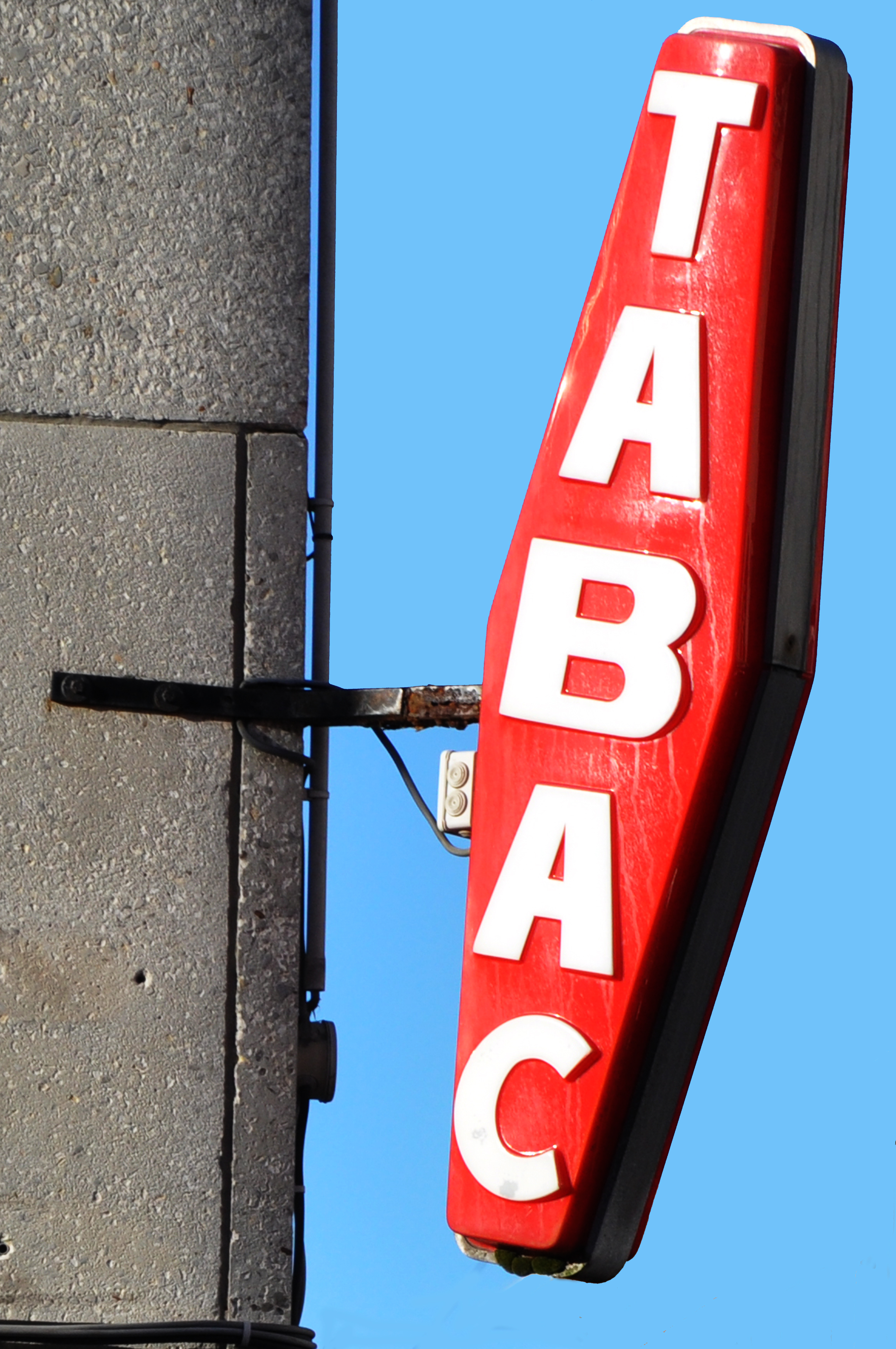
The red ‘carrot’, the official sign for tobacconists in France. In 2020, 3,200 tobacco products and 34,000 vaping products were declared in France.

Smoking in France was first restricted on public transport by the 1976 Veil law. Further restrictions were established in the 1991 Évin law, which contains a variety of measures against alcoholism and tobacco consumption. A much stronger smoking ban was introduced on 1 February 2007. Smoking in enclosed public places such as offices, schools, government buildings and restaurants is strictly prohibited. Law officials may enforce the laws with minimum fines set at €500.

== History ==
In the late 16th century, Jean Nicot introduced tobacco to France. He called it the "Queens Herb" but his name was used for nicotine. In 1610 Cardinal Crescenzio introduced smoking to France after learning about it in England. It became widely popular. After 1650, snuff became fashionable among the French upper classes, including the nobility, and clergy. It replaced smoking tobacco, which remained popular among the middle and lower classes and peasants.

According to Catherine Hill, in 1860, the sales of manufactured cigarettes were almost non-existent. The sales of cigarettes exhibited steady growth, reaching daily usage of 2 cigarettes per adult by 1939. There was a sharp reduction in World War II (1939–1945), then a rapid recovery. Sales continued rapid growth until 1975, followed by a period of stability between 1975 and 1992 (around 5.7 cigarettes). Major restrictions began in 1976. The pinnacle of cigarette consumption was attained in 1985, peaking at a maximum of 6 cigarettes per day.

=== Since 1976 ===
Catherine Hill reported in 1998:

Tobacco sales increased from 3 g per adult per day [in 1900] ... to a maximum of 6.8 g in 1975, then decreased by 10% between 1991 and 1996. Since the early 1950s, the proportion of smokers has been on the decline in the male population and on the increase in the female population. In France, 60,000 deaths are attributable to tobacco smoking. These deaths represent 12% of the total mortality.

The first restrictions on smoking in France were established in the 1976 Veil law, which banned smoking on public transport. Further restrictions were introduced in the 1991 Évin law, which contained measures against alcoholism and tobacco consumption. A much stronger smoking ban was introduced in 2007, which prohibited smoking in enclosed public places such as offices, schools, government buildings, and restaurants. Law officials may enforce the laws with minimum fines set at €500.

The Veil law is named after Simone Veil, the French health minister, who took the initiative to fight against tobacco smoking in France in 1976. Veil banned advertising for tobacco or tobacco products and required tobacco companies to print severe warnings on their cigarette packages, such as "Abus Dangereux – [Overuse is Hazardous]." Another significant aspect of the Veil Law was to place limitations on smoking places affectés à un usage collectif (open to the public).

The Évin law is named after Claude Évin, the minister who pushed for it. The law leaves certain important criteria on what is allowed or not with respect to smoking sections to executive-issued regulations, and it is those regulations that were altered in 2007.

A legal challenge against the new regulations was filed before the Conseil d'État in 2007, but was rejected. Under the initial implementation rules of the 1991 Évin law, restaurants, cafés etc. just had to provide smoking and non-smoking sections, which in practice were often not well separated. In larger establishments, smoking and non-smoking sections could be separate rooms, but often they were just areas within the same room.

== Current status ==
Smoking and vaping are banned in all indoor public places, including government buildings, offices, public transport, universities, museums, restaurants, cafés, nightclubs, etc. Cafés and shops selling tobacco-related products are submitted to the same regulations. No exceptions exist for special smoking rooms fulfilling strict conditions. Additionally, some outdoor public places also ban smoking and vaping (railway stations).

As of 2015, 32% of French adults declare themselves to be regular smokers. In case of violation of tobacco laws, smokers can face a fine of up to €450 and the owner of the venue up to €750. Plain packaging for cigarettes was introduced in 2017.

In November 2023, as part of an extensive anti-tobacco strategy, France declared that smoking is prohibited in certain public spaces.

In June 2025, the French government issued a decree banning smoking in several public places, near schools, and in places where children gather. Electronic cigarettes, however, are exempt from this ban.

== See also ==
- Altadis the main tobacco company, formed in 1999 from SEITA
- European Tobacco Products Directive
- Plain tobacco packaging
- SEITA, the French tobacco monopoly until 1999
- Tobacco products in France
