= Ducados (cigarette) =

Cigarette brand

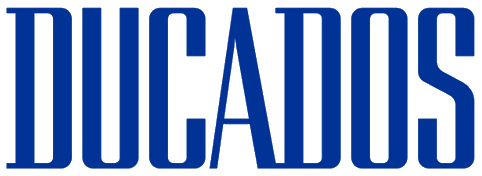
- Product type: Cigarette
- Current owner: Altadis, a division of Imperial Tobacco
- Country: Spain
- Introduced: 1963; 63 years ago
- Markets: See Markets

Ducados is a cigarette brand presently owned and produced by Altadis, a subsidiary of Imperial Tobacco. The name Ducados originates from the Spanish term for Ducats, a historical gold coin, which was incorporated into the initial packaging design.

== History ==
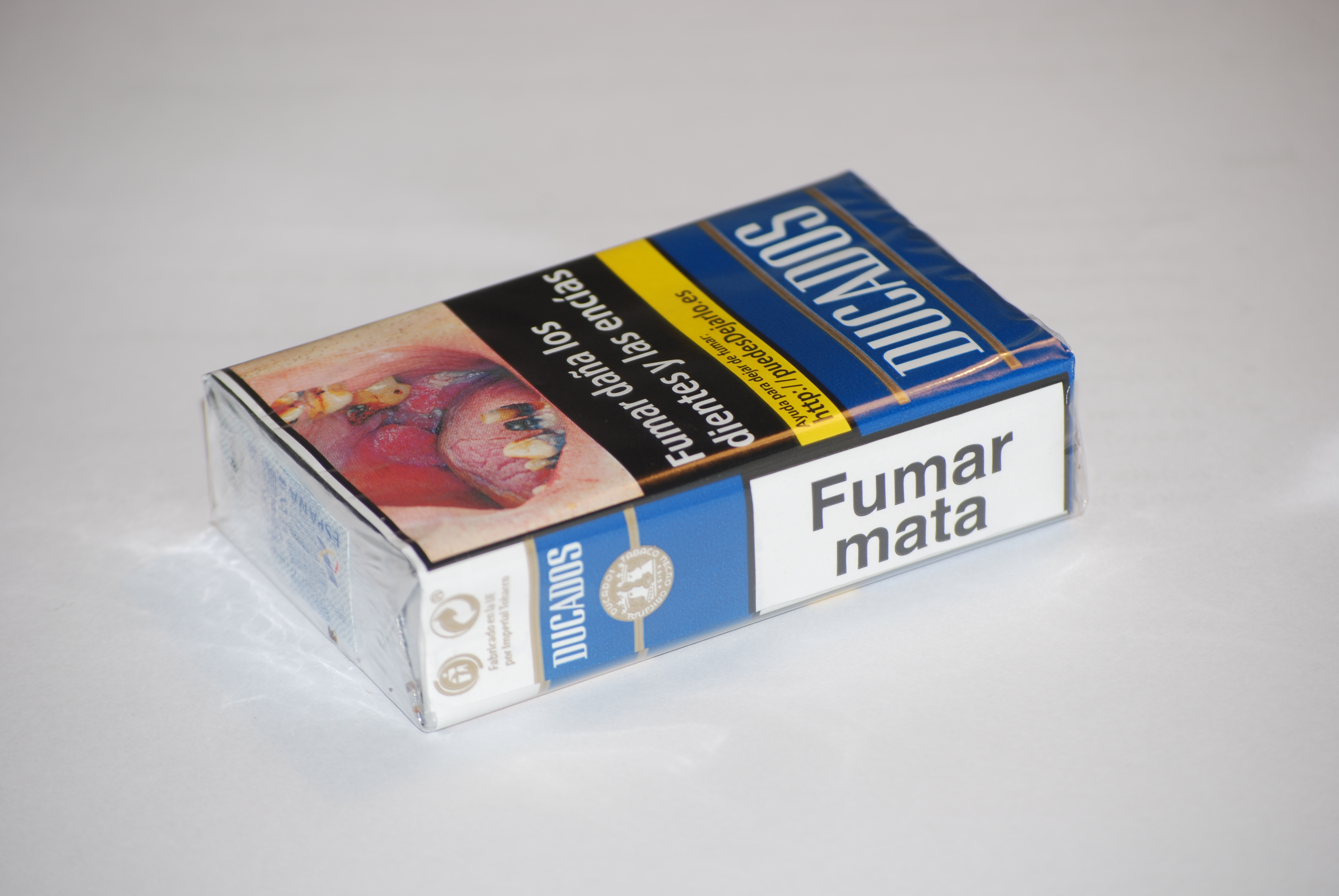
Pack of Ducados

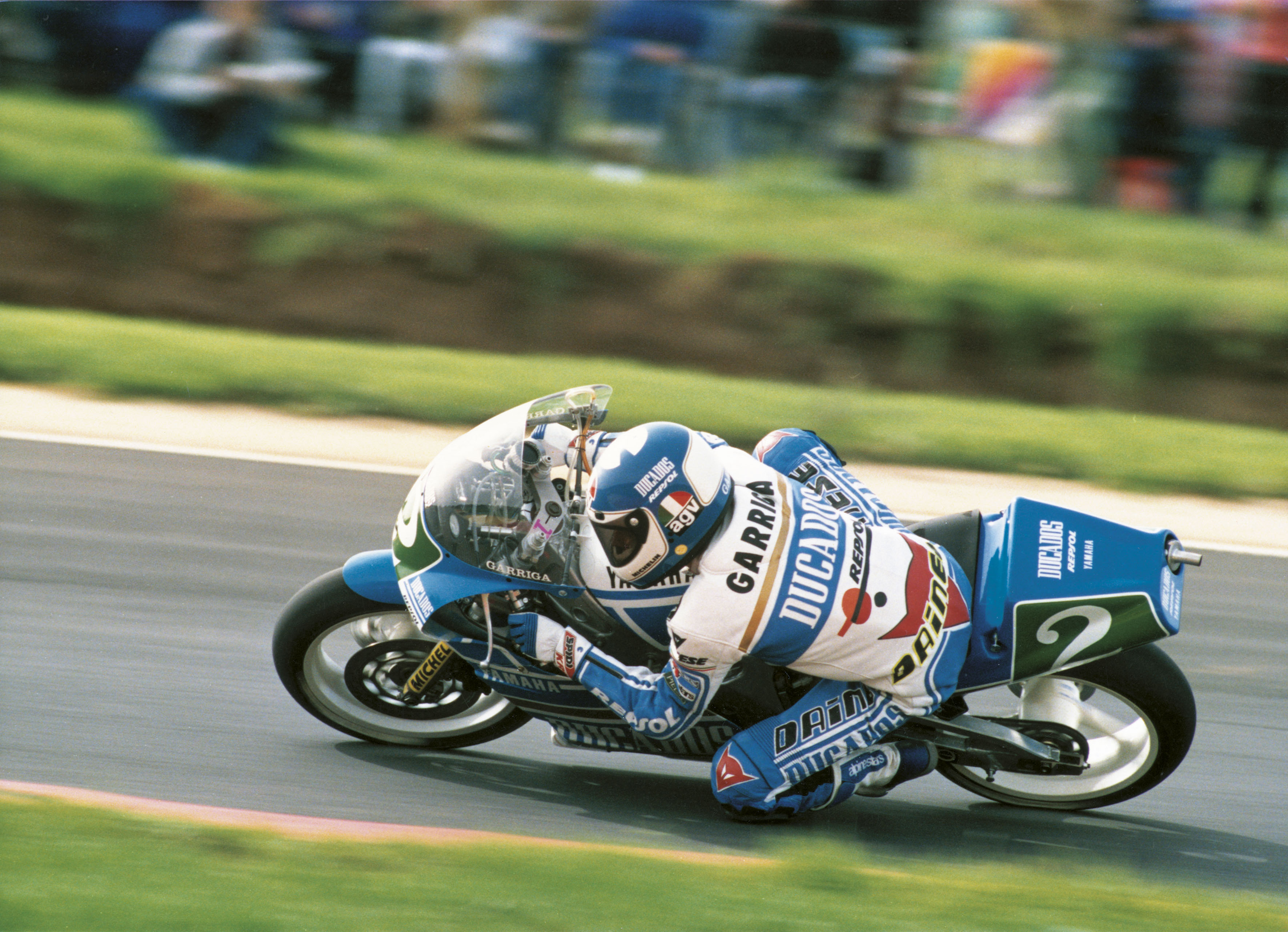
Joan Garriga driving for the Ducados team in 1989

The brand was introduced in 1963. The original Ducados cigarettes, known as "Ducados Negros," were characterized by their robust flavor and primarily appealed to male smokers. However, with the increasing participation of women in the workforce during and after the 1960s, the popularity of these dark cigarettes waned due to many women disliking the lingering taste. In response, Altadis introduced a lighter variant called Ducados Rubio ("Blonde"). The brand emphasizes Ducados as offering a well-developed and flavorful smoking experience.

In Spain, the brand is referred to as "Tabaco negro" (Black tobacco), purportedly reflecting its perceived purity and the reduced use of additives, resulting in a darker hue compared to other brands. Ducados cigarettes are exclusively made with 100% Canarian tobacco, distinguishing them within the Spanish market. Additionally, Ducados stands out for its distinctive use of white filter tips.

== Markets ==
Ducados primarily retails in Spain, although it has been or is also available in Portugal, France, Germany, and Austria.

== Products ==
- Ducados Negro (Black)
- Ducados Rubio (Blonde)
- Ducados Rolling (Rolling tobacco)

== See also ==
- Tobacco smoking
