= Su Rongzai =

Chinese motorcycle racer

- Nationality: Chinese
- Born: 29 November 1975 (age 50); Guangzhou, China
Motorcycle racing career statistics
250cc World Championship
Active years	2006
Manufacturers	Aprilia
2006 championship position	NC (0 pts)
Starts / Wins / Podiums / Poles / F. laps / Points; 1 / 0 / 0 / 0 / 0 / 0

Su Rongzai (simplified Chinese: 苏荣在; traditional Chinese: 蘇榮在; pinyin: Sū Róngzài; born November 29, 1975) is a Chinese Grand Prix motorcycle racer.

== Career statistics ==
=== By season ===
Season	Class	Motorcycle	Team	Race	Win	Podium	Pole	FLap	Pts	Plcd
2006	250cc	Aprilia	China Zongshen Team	1	0	0	0	0	0	NC
Total				1	0	0	0	0	0	

=== Races by year ===
(key)

Year	Class	Bike	1	2	3	4	5	6	7	8	9	10	11	12	13	14	15	16	Pos.	Pts
2006	250cc	Aprilia	SPA	QAT	TUR	CHN	FRA	ITA	CAT	NED	GBR	GER	CZE	MAL; 17	AUS	JPN	POR; DNQ	VAL	NC	0

=== FIM eRoad Racing World Cup ===
Year	Team	1	2	3	4	Pos	Pts
2013	Zongshen	ESP1; 3	ESP2; 1	GER; 2	FRA; Ret	2nd	61
