= 2013 FIM eRoad Racing World Cup =

Sports event

Seasons
- ← none 2019 →

The 2013 FIM eRoad Racing World Cup season was the only season of the eRoad Racing championship for electric motorcycle road racing, organised by the Fédération Internationale de Motocyclisme (FIM) following the unification of the former TTXGP series with the FIM "e-Power" electric motorcycle racing series. Two separate series were held in Europe and in North America. Since the planned World Final was cancelled, two separate winners were determined, one for each series: Ho Chi Fung (Zongshen, China) for the European series and Eric Bostrom (Icon Brammo, USA) for the North American series.

== Calendar ==
The 2013 eRoadRacing World Cup was planned to consist of 4 races in Europe and 4 in North America, with a world final in Asia. However, only 6 races took place in the end, as two of the American races as well as the World Final had to be cancelled because of time constraints. The initially announced Events at Miller Motorsport Park in Utah were among those cancelled. The proposition for the World Final was set to be held on the Buddh International Circuit in India as part of the Superbike World Championship round, but since that was cancelled there was no unification of both series.

European series

Round	Date	Event	Circuit	Winner
E1	14 July	(Spain) Green Prix of Valencia	Circuit Ricardo Tormo	(China) Ho Chi Fung
E2	14 July	(Spain) Green Prix of Valencia	Circuit Ricardo Tormo	(China) Su Rong Zai
E3	18 August	(Germany) 16. German Speedweek	Motorsport Arena Oschersleben	(China) Ho Chi Fung
E4	21 September	(France) 24 Heures Moto Le Mans	Circuit de la Sarthe Bugatti	(China) Ho Chi Fung

American series

Round	Date	Event	Circuit	Winner
A1	21 July	(United States) Red Bull U.S. Grand Prix	Mazda Raceway Laguna Seca	(United States) Eric Bostrom
A2	18 August	(United States) Red Bull Indianapolis Grand Prix	Indianapolis Motor Speedway	(United States) Shane Turpin

== Participants ==
Team	Motorcycle	No.	Rider	Rounds
(India) Agni Racing	Agni 12	62	(United Kingdom) Sam West	E1–4
(India) Agni Racing	Agni 09	50	(Germany) Harald Gasse	E3
(China) Zongshen	Zongshen Prototype	59	(China) Ho Chi Fung	E1–4
(China) Zongshen	Zongshen Prototype	91	(China) Su Rong Zai	E1–4
(China) Zongshen	Zongshen Prototype	26	(Spain) Oscar Peña	E1–2
(China) Zongshen	Zongshen Prototype	6	(Germany) Thomas Schuricht	E3
(China) Zongshen	Zongshen Prototype	43	(Brazil) Rhalf Lo Turco	E4
(Netherlands) Renegade Z	Zero S 2013	72	(Spain) Julián Miralles	E1–2
(Netherlands) Renegade Z	Zero S 2013	46	(Spain) Adrián Menchen	E1–2
(Netherlands) Renegade Z	Zero S 2013	55	(Germany) Harald Gasse	E1–2
(Netherlands) Renegade Z	Zero S 2013	35	(Republic of Ireland) Cormac Conroy	E3
(Netherlands) Renegade Z	Zero S 2013	39	(Sweden) Peter Linden	E3
(Netherlands) Renegade Z	Zero S 2013	5	(United Kingdom) Chris Forster	E4
(Netherlands) Renegade Z	Zero S 2013	10	(France) [[Philippe Monneret]]	E4
(United Kingdom) SBK City Racing	Mavizen TTX02	43	(Brazil) Rhalf Lo Turco	E3
(United States) Icon Brammo	Brammo Empulse RR	14	(United States) Shane Turpin	A1–2
(United States) Icon Brammo	Brammo Empulse RR	32	(United States) Eric Bostrom	A1–2
(United States) AKR Daytona Racing	Brammo Empulse TTX	8	(United States) Arthur Kowitz	A1–2
(United States) Electric Cowboy	Zero S	10	(United States) Brandon Miller	A1
(United States) Electric Cowboy	Zero S	24	(United States) Elaine Carpenter	A2
(United States) SBK Racing	Zero S	28	(United States) Ted Rich	A1–2
(United States) Be.ev.com Racing	Zero S	64	(United States) Jeremiah Johnson	A1–2
(United States) K Squared Racing	Zero S	96	(United States) Kenyon Kluge	A1–2
(United States) Parker Brammo	Brammo Empulse TTX	93	(United States) Shelina Moreda	A1–2
(United States) SPSU Racing	Hornet 1	74	(United States) Caesar Gonzales	A2

== World Cup standings ==
=== European series ===
Pos	Rider	Team	(Spain) ESP1	(Spain) ESP2	(Germany) GER	(France) FRA	Pts
1	(China) Ho Chi Fung	Zongshen	1	Ret	1	1	75
2	(China) Su Rong Zai	Zongshen	3	1	2	Ret	61
3	(United Kingdom) Sam West	Agni	6	5	3	2	57
4	(Spain) Oscar Peña	Zongshen	2	2			40
5	(Spain) Adrián Menchen	Renegade Z	4	3			29
6	(Germany) Harald Gasse	Renegade Z/Agni	7	6	7		28
7	(Spain) Julián Miralles	Renegade Z	5	4			24
8	(Brazil) Rhalf Lo Turco	Renegade Z/SBK			Ret	3	16
9	(Sweden) Peter Linden	Renegade Z			4		13
9	(United Kingdom) Chris Foster	Renegade Z				4	13
11	(Republic of Ireland) Cormac Conroy	Renegade Z			5		11
11	(France) Philippe Monneret	Renegade Z				5	11
13	(Germany) Thomas Schuricht	Zongshen			6		10

=== American series ===
Pos	Rider	Team	(United States) LAG	(United States) IND	Pts
1	(United States) Eric Bostrom	Icon Brammo	1	2	45
2	(United States) Kenyon Kluge	K Squared	2	3	36
3	(United States) Jeremiah Johnson	Be.ev.com	3	4	29
4	(United States) Shane Turpin	Icon Brammo	Ret	1	25
5	(United States) Arthur Kowitz	AKR Daytona	4	8	21
6	(United States) Shelina Moreda	Parker Brammo	Ret	5	11
7	(United States) Ted Rich	SBK Racing	Ret	6	10
8	(United States) Elaine Carpenter	Electric Cowboy		7	9
	(United States) Brandon Nozaki Miller	Electric Cowboy	Ret		0
	(United States) Caesar Gonzales	Southern Polytechnic State University EVT		DNQ	0

Colour	Result
Gold	Winner
Silver	Second place
Bronze	Third place
Green	Points classification
Blue	Non-points classification
Blue	Non-classified finish (NC)
Purple	Retired, not classified (Ret)
Red	Did not qualify (DNQ)
Red	Did not pre-qualify (DNPQ)
Black	Disqualified (DSQ)
White	Did not start (DNS)
White	Withdrew (WD)
White	Race cancelled (C)
Blank	Did not practice (DNP)
Blank	Did not arrive (DNA)
Blank	Excluded (EX)
