= Fabricio Perren =

Argentine motorcycle racer

- Nationality: Argentina
- Born: 1 July 1988 (age 38); Lehmann, Argentina

Fabricio Perren (born 1 July 1988) is a former Grand Prix motorcycle racer from Argentina. In 2006, he joined the Stop and Go Team for the Italian Grand Prix, and went on to race in the 250cc World Championship. Racing with Yamaha in 2013, he scored the best time in the Super Sport category of the Argentine Speed Championship.

== Career statistics ==
=== By season ===
Season	Class	Motorcycle	Team	Race	Win	Podium	Pole	FLap	Pts	Plcd
2004	125cc	Honda	RC Recouso Sport	1	0	0	0	0	0	NC
2006	250cc	Honda	Stop And Go Racing Team	11	0	0	0	0	7	27th
Total				12	0	0	0	0	7	

=== Races by year ===
(key)

Year	Class	Bike	1	2	3	4	5	6	7	8	9	10	11	12	13	14	15	16	Pos.	Pts
2004	125cc	Honda	RSA	SPA	FRA	ITA	CAT; Ret	NED	BRA	GER	GBR	CZE	POR	JPN	QAT	MAL	AUS	VAL	NC	0
2006	250cc	Honda	SPA	QAT	TUR	CHN	FRA	ITA; 15	CAT; 15	NED; 16	GBR; Ret	GER; 17	CZE; 16	MAL; Ret	AUS; 14	JPN; 15	POR; 17	VAL; 14	27th	7
