= 2006 Malaysian motorcycle Grand Prix =

(Malaysia) 2006 Malaysian Grand Prix
Race details
- Race 13 of 17 races in the 2006 Grand Prix motorcycle racing season
- Date: 10 September 2006
- Official name: Marlboro Malaysian Motorcycle Grand Prix
- Location: Sepang International Circuit
- Course: Permanent racing facility; 5.543 km (3.444 mi)

MotoGP
Pole position
- Rider: (Italy) Valentino Rossi
- Time: 2:00.605
Fastest lap
- Rider: (Italy) Loris Capirossi
- Time: 2:02.127
Podium
- First: (Italy) Valentino Rossi
- Second: (Italy) Loris Capirossi
- Third: (Spain) Dani Pedrosa

250cc
Pole position
- Rider: (Spain) Héctor Barberá
- Time: 2:08.266
Fastest lap
- Rider: (Japan) Hiroshi Aoyama
- Time: 2:08.761
Podium
- First: (Spain) Jorge Lorenzo
- Second: (Italy) Andrea Dovizioso
- Third: (San Marino) Alex de Angelis

125cc
Pole position
- Rider: (Spain) Álvaro Bautista
- Time: 2:13.846
Fastest lap
- Rider: (Spain) Álvaro Bautista
- Time: 2:13.118
Podium
- First: (Spain) Álvaro Bautista
- Second: (Finland) Mika Kallio
- Third: (Spain) Héctor Faubel

The 2006 Malaysian motorcycle Grand Prix was the thirteenth round of the 2006 MotoGP Championship. It took place on the weekend of 8–10 September 2006 at the Sepang International Circuit.

This was the last MotoGP round to be sponsored by a tobacco company.

== MotoGP classification ==
Pos.	No.	Rider	Team	Manufacturer	Laps	Time/Retired	Grid	Points
1	46	(Italy) Valentino Rossi	Camel Yamaha Team	Yamaha	21	43:07.829	1	25
2	65	(Italy) Loris Capirossi	Ducati Marlboro Team	Ducati	21	+0.849	3	20
3	26	(Spain) Dani Pedrosa	Repsol Honda Team	Honda	21	+3.863	5	16
4	69	(United States) Nicky Hayden	Repsol Honda Team	Honda	21	+5.780	2	13
5	15	(Spain) Sete Gibernau	Ducati Marlboro Team	Ducati	21	+9.301	6	11
6	21	(United States) John Hopkins	Rizla Suzuki MotoGP	Suzuki	21	+11.081	8	10
7	10	(United States) Kenny Roberts Jr.	Team Roberts	KR211V	21	+11.838	4	9
8	27	(Australia) Casey Stoner	Honda LCR	Honda	21	+12.267	10	8
9	33	(Italy) Marco Melandri	Fortuna Honda	Honda	21	+15.019	9	7
10	5	(United States) Colin Edwards	Camel Yamaha Team	Yamaha	21	+19.909	11	6
11	71	(Australia) Chris Vermeulen	Rizla Suzuki MotoGP	Suzuki	21	+24.371	16	5
12	7	(Spain) Carlos Checa	Tech 3 Yamaha	Yamaha	21	+30.884	15	4
13	17	(France) Randy de Puniet	Kawasaki Racing Team	Kawasaki	21	+36.335	7	3
14	6	(Japan) Makoto Tamada	Konica Minolta Honda	Honda	21	+48.777	13	2
15	66	(Germany) Alex Hofmann	Pramac d'Antin MotoGP	Ducati	21	+59.081	17	1
16	77	(United Kingdom) James Ellison	Tech 3 Yamaha	Yamaha	21	+1:05.787	18	
17	30	(Spain) José Luis Cardoso	Pramac d'Antin MotoGP	Ducati	21	+1:37.862	19	
Ret	24	(Spain) Toni Elías	Fortuna Honda	Honda	10	Accident	14	
Ret	56	(Japan) Shinya Nakano	Kawasaki Racing Team	Kawasaki	0	Accident	12	

== 250 cc classification ==
Pos.	No.	Rider	Manufacturer	Laps	Time/Retired	Grid	Points
1	48	(Spain) Jorge Lorenzo	Aprilia	20	43:15.499	2	25
2	34	(Italy) Andrea Dovizioso	Honda	20	+5.428	5	20
3	7	(San Marino) Alex de Angelis	Aprilia	20	+10.225	6	16
4	55	(Japan) Yuki Takahashi	Honda	20	+25.669	9	13
5	15	(Italy) Roberto Locatelli	Aprilia	20	+31.152	4	11
6	73	(Japan) Shuhei Aoyama	Honda	20	+39.936	7	10
7	50	(France) Sylvain Guintoli	Aprilia	20	+50.672	10	9
8	58	(Italy) Marco Simoncelli	Gilera	20	+1:06.107	12	8
9	42	(Spain) Aleix Espargaró	Honda	20	+1:06.556	13	7
10	16	(France) Jules Cluzel	Aprilia	20	+1:17.868	20	6
11	21	(France) Arnaud Vincent	Honda	20	+1:27.761	27	5
12	24	(Spain) Jordi Carchano	Aprilia	20	+1:54.913	18	4
13	44	(Japan) Taro Sekiguchi	Aprilia	20	+2:00.097	22	3
14	22	(Italy) Luca Morelli	Aprilia	20	+2:24.623	21	2
15	14	(Australia) Anthony West	Aprilia	19	+1 lap	26	1
16	59	(China) Chin Feng Ho	Aprilia	19	+1 lap	23	
17	56	(China) Rong Zai Su	Aprilia	19	+1 lap	25	
18	85	(Italy) Alessio Palumbo	Aprilia	19	+1 lap	24	
Ret	37	(Argentina) Fabricio Perren	Honda	17	Accident	19	
Ret	96	(Czech Republic) Jakub Smrž	Aprilia	9	Accident	15	
Ret	54	(San Marino) Manuel Poggiali	KTM	9	Accident	11	
Ret	8	(Italy) Andrea Ballerini	Aprilia	9	Accident	17	
Ret	28	(Germany) Dirk Heidolf	Aprilia	7	Retirement	14	
Ret	4	(Japan) Hiroshi Aoyama	KTM	4	Retirement	3	
Ret	23	(Spain) Arturo Tizón	Honda	3	Accident	16	
Ret	36	(Colombia) Martín Cárdenas	Honda	1	Accident	8	
Ret	80	(Spain) Héctor Barberá	Aprilia	1	Accident	1	
WD	25	(Italy) Alex Baldolini	Aprilia		Withdrew		

== 125 cc classification ==
Pos.	No.	Rider	Manufacturer	Laps	Time/Retired	Grid	Points
1	19	(Spain) Álvaro Bautista	Aprilia	12	26:52.154	1	25
2	36	(Finland) Mika Kallio	KTM	12	+3.577	2	20
3	55	(Spain) Héctor Faubel	Aprilia	12	+9.904	5	16
4	60	(Spain) Julián Simón	KTM	12	+9.974	11	13
5	6	(Spain) Joan Olivé	Aprilia	12	+11.551	4	11
6	33	(Spain) Sergio Gadea	Aprilia	12	+11.588	15	10
7	75	(Italy) Mattia Pasini	Aprilia	12	+13.157	3	9
8	14	(Hungary) Gábor Talmácsi	Honda	12	+13.198	12	8
9	52	(Czech Republic) Lukáš Pešek	Derbi	12	+13.934	7	7
10	18	(Spain) Nicolás Terol	Derbi	12	+15.004	6	6
11	32	(Italy) Fabrizio Lai	Honda	12	+19.568	8	5
12	34	(Spain) Esteve Rabat	Honda	12	+25.342	24	4
13	1	(Switzerland) Thomas Lüthi	Honda	12	+26.317	16	3
14	42	(Spain) Pol Espargaró	Derbi	12	+34.470	22	2
15	24	(Italy) Simone Corsi	Gilera	12	+41.849	19	1
16	12	(Italy) Federico Sandi	Aprilia	12	+41.917	21	
17	11	(Germany) Sandro Cortese	Honda	12	+42.058	10	
18	44	(Czech Republic) Karel Abraham	Aprilia	12	+47.431	26	
19	20	(Italy) Roberto Tamburini	Aprilia	12	+47.466	23	
20	9	(Austria) Michael Ranseder	KTM	12	+48.003	29	
21	16	(Italy) Michele Conti	Honda	12	+48.480	31	
22	43	(Spain) Manuel Hernández	Aprilia	12	+49.229	27	
23	45	(Hungary) Imre Tóth	Aprilia	12	+49.987	18	
24	15	(Italy) Michele Pirro	Honda	12	+54.614	25	
25	87	(Italy) Roberto Lacalendola	Aprilia	12	+1:07.132	36	
26	80	(Indonesia) Doni Tata Pradita	Yamaha	12	+1:24.614	35	
Ret	13	(Italy) Dino Lombardi	Aprilia	11	Retirement	30	
Ret	37	(Netherlands) Joey Litjens	Honda	11	Retirement	33	
Ret	71	(Japan) Tomoyoshi Koyama	Malaguti	6	Accident	9	
Ret	35	(Italy) Raffaele De Rosa	Aprilia	4	Retirement	14	
Ret	22	(Spain) Pablo Nieto	Aprilia	4	Retirement	13	
Ret	63	(France) Mike Di Meglio	Honda	2	Retirement	20	
Ret	8	(Italy) Lorenzo Zanetti	Aprilia	0	Accident	17	
DNS	26	(Switzerland) Vincent Braillard	Aprilia	0	Did not restart	32	
DNS	29	(Italy) Andrea Iannone	Aprilia	0	Did not restart	28	
DNS	53	(Italy) Simone Grotzkyj	Aprilia	0	Did not start	34	
DNS	7	(France) Alexis Masbou	Malaguti		Did not start		
DNS	17	(Germany) Stefan Bradl	KTM		Did not start		

== Championship standings after the race (MotoGP) ==
Below are the standings for the top five riders and constructors after round thirteen has concluded.

Riders' Championship standings

Pos.	Rider	Points
1	(United States) Nicky Hayden	214
2	(Spain) Dani Pedrosa	192
3	(Italy) Valentino Rossi	188
4	(Italy) Loris Capirossi	171
5	(Italy) Marco Melandri	168

Constructors' Championship standings

Pos.	Constructor	Points
1	(Japan) Honda	278
2	(Japan) Yamaha	226
3	(Italy) Ducati	180
4	(Japan) Suzuki	111
5	(United States) KR211V	101

- Note: Only the top five positions are included for both sets of standings.

Previous race: 2006 Czech Republic Grand Prix	FIM Grand Prix World Championship; 2006 season	Next race: 2006 Australian Grand Prix
Previous race: 2005 Malaysian Grand Prix	Malaysian motorcycle Grand Prix	Next race: 2007 Malaysian Grand Prix
