= Dani Pedrosa =

Spanish motorcycle racer (born 1985)

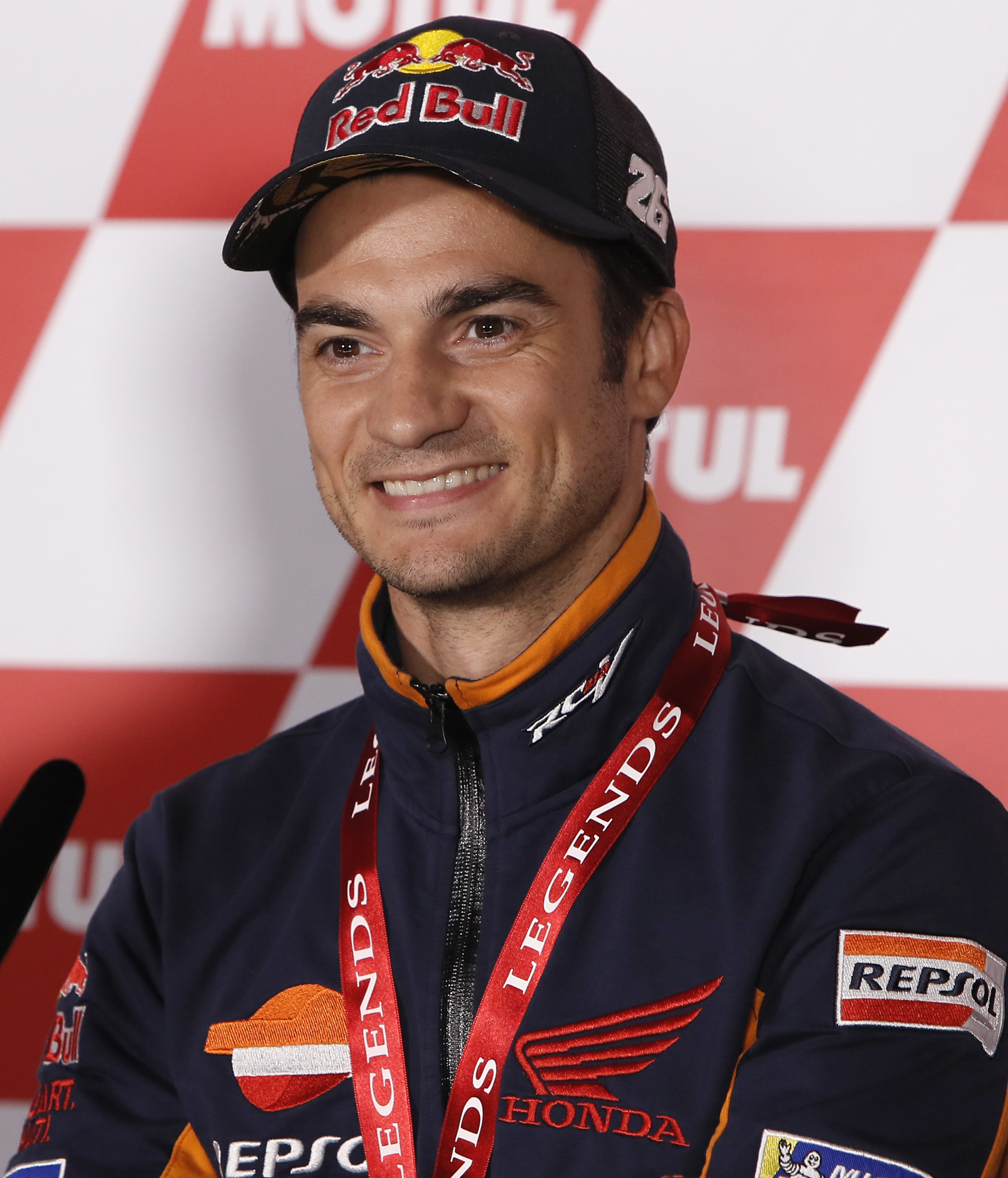
- Pedrosa at the 2018 Valencian Grand Prix
- Nationality: Spanish
- Born: 29 September 1985 (age 41); Sabadell, Spain
- Current team: Red Bull KTM Factory Racing (Test rider)
- Bike number: 26
- Website: danipedrosa.com
Motorcycle racing career statistics
MotoGP World Championship
Active years	2006–2018, 2021, 2023–2024
Manufacturers	Honda (2006–2018); KTM (2021, 2023–2024)
Championships	0
2023 championship position	21st (32 pts)
Starts / Wins / Podiums / Poles / F. laps / Points; 221 / 31 / 112 / 31 / 44 / 3015
250cc World Championship
Active years	2004–2005
Manufacturers	Honda
Championships	2 (2004, 2005)
2005 championship position	1st (309 pts)
Starts / Wins / Podiums / Poles / F. laps / Points; 32 / 15 / 24 / 9 / 15 / 626
125cc World Championship
Active years	2001–2003
Manufacturers	Honda
Championships	1 (2003)
2003 championship position	1st (223 pts)
Starts / Wins / Podiums / Poles / F. laps / Points; 46 / 8 / 17 / 9 / 5 / 566

Daniel Pedrosa Ramal (born 29 September 1985) is a Spanish former Grand Prix motorcycle racer. He won three Grand Prix world championship titles: in the 125cc class in 2003, the 250cc class in 2004, and the 250cc class in 2005. He is the youngest champion of all time in the intermediate (250cc/Moto2) class.

In 2006, Pedrosa moved into the MotoGP class to ride for Repsol Honda, where he would remain for the next thirteen years. He took 31 race wins and 112 podiums during this time, and finished as championship runner-up in 2007, 2010 and 2012. He is often cited as the best rider to never win a MotoGP championship. He retired from regular competition at the end of the 2018 season. In 2019, the former Curva Dry Sac, a corner at the Spanish Circuito de Jerez, was renamed Curva Dani Pedrosa (English: Dani Pedrosa Corner) in his honour.

Pedrosa currently works as a test and development rider for Red Bull KTM Factory Racing. In 2021, he raced for KTM as a wildcard rider in Austria at the Styrian Grand Prix, and finished tenth. He raced again in 2023 at Jerez, where he placed seventh in the main race and sixth in the sprint, and in Misano, where he finished fourth in both races. He has also dabbled in car racing: he competed in the Lamborghini Super Trofeo Europe in 2022, driving for the FFF Racing Team.

== Career ==
=== Early career ===
Born in Sabadell, Catalonia, Spain, Pedrosa started riding bikes at the early age of four, when he got his first motorcycle, an Italjet 50, which had side-wheels. His first racing bike was a minibike replica of a Kawasaki, which he got at the age of six and which he used to race with his friends. Pedrosa experienced real racing at the age of nine when he entered the Spanish Minibike Championship and ended his debut season in second place, scoring his first podium finish in the second race of the season. The next year, Pedrosa entered the same championship, but health problems prevented him from improving his results, and he ended that season in third position.

=== 125cc World Championship ===
In 2001, Pedrosa made his World Championship debut in the 125cc class after being selected from the Movistar Activa Cup, a series designed to promote fresh racing talent in Spain, back in 1999. Under the guidance of Alberto Puig, Pedrosa scored two podium finishes in the first season and won his first race the following year, when he finished third in the championship. In 2003, he won five races and won the championship with two rounds remaining, scoring 223 points. In his first championship-winning year, Pedrosa scored five victories and six podium finishes. A week after winning the championship, eighteen-year-old Pedrosa broke both of his ankles in a crash during practice at Phillip Island, ending his season.

=== 250cc World Championship ===
After winning the 125cc Championship, Pedrosa moved up to the 250cc class in 2004 without a proper test on the new bike because his ankles were healing during the off-season. Going into the season unprepared, Pedrosa won the first race in South Africa and went on to clinch the 250cc World Championship title, including rookie of the year honours. In his first season in the 250cc class, Pedrosa scored seven victories and 13 podium finishes. Pedrosa decided to stay for one more season in the 250cc class, and he won another title, once again with two races remaining in the championship. In 2005, Pedrosa won eight races and scored 14 podium finishes, despite a shoulder injury he sustained in a practice session for the Japanese Grand Prix.

=== MotoGP World Championship ===
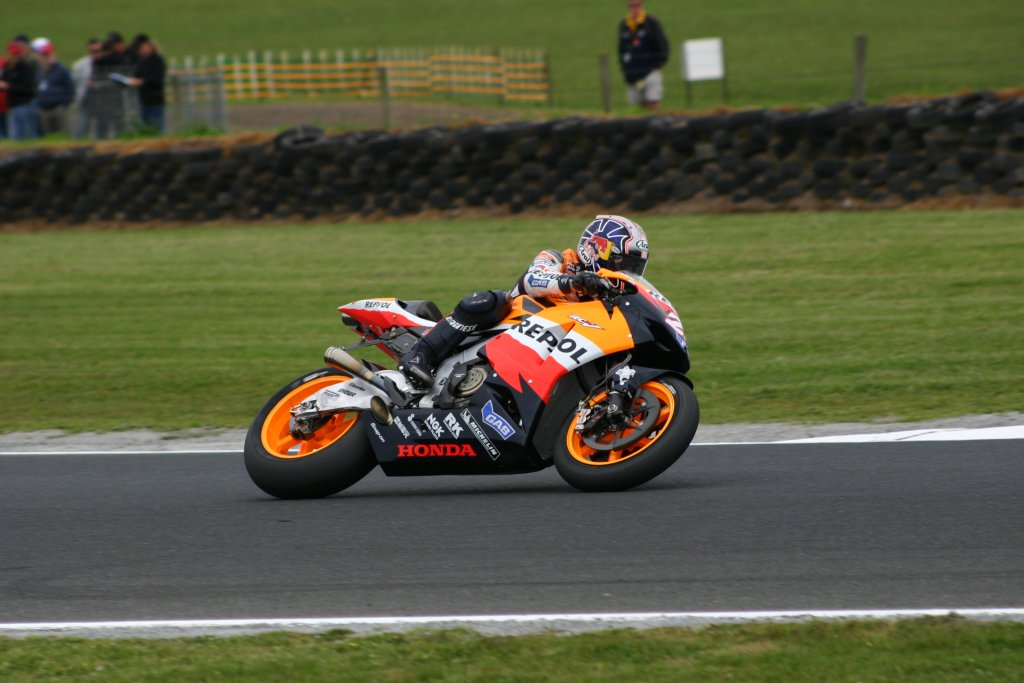
Pedrosa on board the Repsol Honda RC211V at the 2006 Australian Grand Prix

==== 2006 ====
Pedrosa made the move to 990cc MotoGP bikes in 2006, riding for Repsol Honda. Critics said that Pedrosa's tiny stature was not strong enough to handle a big, heavy MotoGP bike and successfully race in the premier class. Proving critics wrong, he finished second in the opening round at Jerez on 26 March 2006. At his fourth ever MotoGP appearance, on 14 May 2006, during the Chinese Grand Prix, he won his first race. This win made him the equal second youngest winner (tied with Norick Abe) in the premier class at the time, behind Freddie Spencer. He won his second MotoGP race at Donington Park and became a strong candidate for the MotoGP Championship. It was a memorable victory for Pedrosa, who shared the podium for the first time with Valentino Rossi in second place. He also took two pole positions in the first half of the season. Until the Malaysian Grand Prix at Sepang, Pedrosa was second in the Championship only behind his more experienced teammate Nicky Hayden. However, he fell heavily during free practice and suffered a severe gash to the knee, which practically rendered him immobile. Pedrosa qualified fifth on the grid in that race after heavy rain cancelled the qualifying session. He managed to finish third in the race, behind Rossi and Ducati rider Loris Capirossi.

However, in the next races, Pedrosa's form dropped and he struggled with the bike, moving him down to 5th place in the MotoGP standings. His poor performance continued at Estoril. After a promising start, he briefly ran second before being passed by Colin Edwards and then championship leader and teammate Hayden. On lap 5, he and Hayden were involved in a crash. Pedrosa made a mistake whilst trying to overtake Hayden, slid and crashed out of the race, taking out Hayden on the way. This crash ended his slim chances of winning the championship and also caused Hayden to lose his lead in the championship standings, as Rossi managed to finish second. However, two weeks later, Hayden recovered to win the championship while Pedrosa managed to finish in fourth place. This result clinched his fifth place in overall standings in his debut season, thus taking the title as Rookie of the Year, beating former 250cc rival Casey Stoner. At the end of season three-day test of 2006 at Jerez, Pedrosa put his 800 cc RC212V at the top of the timesheets (on qualifying tyres) edging out Rossi, who had been fastest on the first two days, by 0.214 seconds.

==== 2007 ====
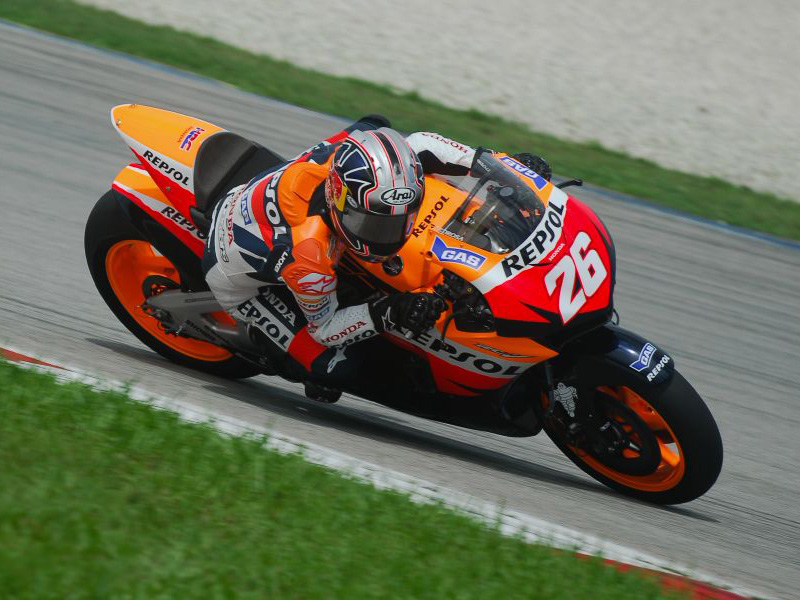
Pedrosa during pre-season testing for the 2007 season

Pedrosa continued to race with Honda in 2007 on their Honda RC212V, the new 800 cc bike. The machine had problems, and Pedrosa was taken out of races by Olivier Jacque and by Randy de Puniet, but he finished the season in second place behind Stoner and ahead of Rossi. He signed a two-year contract with Repsol Honda for 2008 and 2009.

==== 2008 ====
In 2008, Pedrosa's problems with the RC212V continued when he was injured in the pre-season and missed developmental testing, but started the season well by scoring a podium at the first round. While leading the race and the standings in the German round, he crashed and was injured, keeping him from racing in the following two rounds. Michelin's performance in MotoGP deteriorated, resulting in Pedrosa switching to Bridgestone at the Indianapolis round. He finished third in the standings in 2008.

==== 2009 ====
As in 2008, Pedrosa crashed in the 2009 pre-season and injured himself, keeping him from testing the machine before the start of the season. He placed 11th in the first round, but recovered his fitness in the following rounds. At the fifth round, he injured himself again in practice and then fell during the race, putting him 33 points behind the leader.

==== 2010 ====
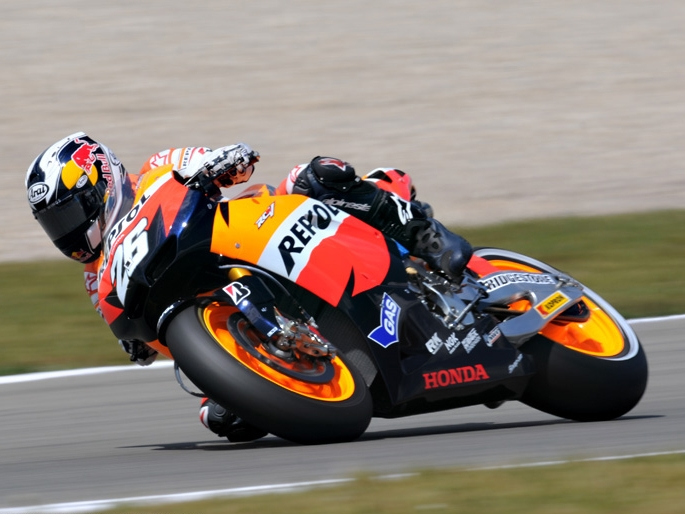
Pedrosa at the 2010 Dutch TT

For 2010, Pedrosa reverted to number 26—a number he used when he first entered MotoGP—from number 2 in 2008 and number 3 in 2009. He took this decision to please his fans who had asked him to return to the number he had always used. Pedrosa won four races in 2010 and finished second in the championship standings behind Jorge Lorenzo.

==== 2011 ====
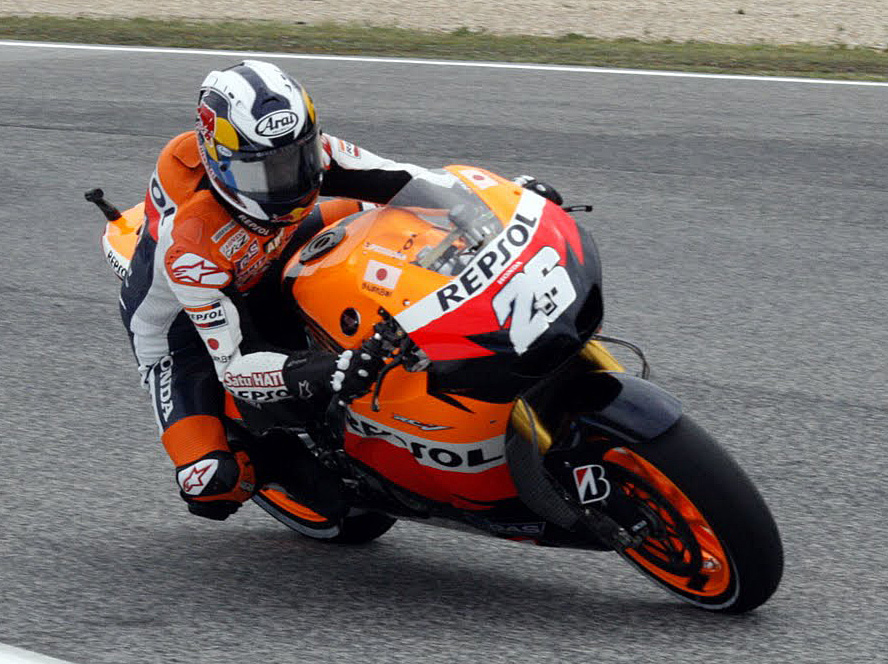
Pedrosa at the Portuguese Grand Prix, where he took his first win of the season

Pedrosa remained with an expanded three-rider Repsol Honda team in 2011, partnering Andrea Dovizioso and Casey Stoner. Pedrosa took podium placings in the opening three races of the season, culminating in a victory at the Portuguese Grand Prix in May. On lap 18 of the following race in France, Pedrosa was involved in an incident with Gresini Racing's Marco Simoncelli while fighting over second place in the race; Simoncelli passed Pedrosa on the outside line into the Chemin aux Boeufs, but pulled in front of Pedrosa and as a result, Pedrosa clipped Simoncelli's rear wheel and fell to the ground. Simoncelli was given a ride-through penalty, while the fall left Pedrosa with a broken collarbone, which ruled him out until July's Italian Grand Prix, where he finished in eighth place.

Pedrosa claimed his second victory of the season at the German Grand Prix, after taking advantage of an error by Lorenzo with nine laps left in the race. He finished third at Laguna Seca the following weekend, before taking his first pole position of the season at the Czech Grand Prix. He crashed out during the race, but finished the next three races in second place, before winning his third race of the season – and the 400th race win by a Spanish rider – in Japan, where his title chances in 2010 had ended; and moved within one point of teammate Dovizioso for third place in the championship. Dovizioso finished ahead of Pedrosa in both Australia and Valencia, while the Malaysian race, in which Pedrosa had qualified on pole for, was cancelled due to the death of Simoncelli in the first attempt to run the race.

==== 2012 ====
Pedrosa remained with Repsol Honda into the 2012 season, again partnering Stoner in a reduced two-bike effort. Pedrosa finished six of the first seven races on the podium, with a best result of second on three occasions. He won his first race of the season at the German Grand Prix, winning at the Sachsenring for the third year in succession; Pedrosa and Stoner had been running one-two in the race, before Stoner crashed on the final lap. At the Italian Grand Prix, it was announced that Pedrosa had signed a two-year contract extension with the Repsol Honda team from 2013 onwards, and would be partnered by Moto2 front-runner Marc Márquez. Pedrosa finished that weekend's race second, before a third place at the United States Grand Prix. Following the summer break, Pedrosa scored his second victory of the season at Indianapolis, winning from pole position as well as setting a lap record during the race. He followed that victory up with another at Brno, prevailing after a final-lap battle with main title rival Jorge Lorenzo.

At Misano, Pedrosa qualified on pole for the race, which was then delayed after Karel Abraham's Ducati stalled just before the start, forcing the riders to complete a second parade lap. Pedrosa's front tyre warmer became stuck just before his bike was restarted; the bike was removed from the grid – to be replaced by the back-up bike – but the tyre warmer was removed at the last moment and the bike was restored to the grid. However, Pedrosa had to start the race from the back, due to a rules infraction relating to the start procedure. He had managed to make his way into the top ten on the opening lap before he was taken out by Héctor Barberá, losing ground to Lorenzo, who won the race. In the Aragon Grand Prix, Pedrosa qualified second but took the victory, after passing Lorenzo on lap seven; the result allowed Pedrosa to close the championship gap to 33 points. In the end, Pedrosa failed to become champion after his DNF in Australia. He finished the 2012 season as runner-up to Lorenzo with 332 points, the highest number of points ever gained without taking the title at the time.

==== 2013 ====
Pedrosa remained with Repsol Honda into the 2013 season partnering new teammate Marc Márquez. He won races in Spain, France, and Malaysia but missed the race in Germany, due to injury. He also failed to finish in Aragon after contact with Márquez. He obtained 300 points for the season, and finished in third place in the championship, behind Jorge Lorenzo and Márquez, who won the championship.

==== 2014 ====
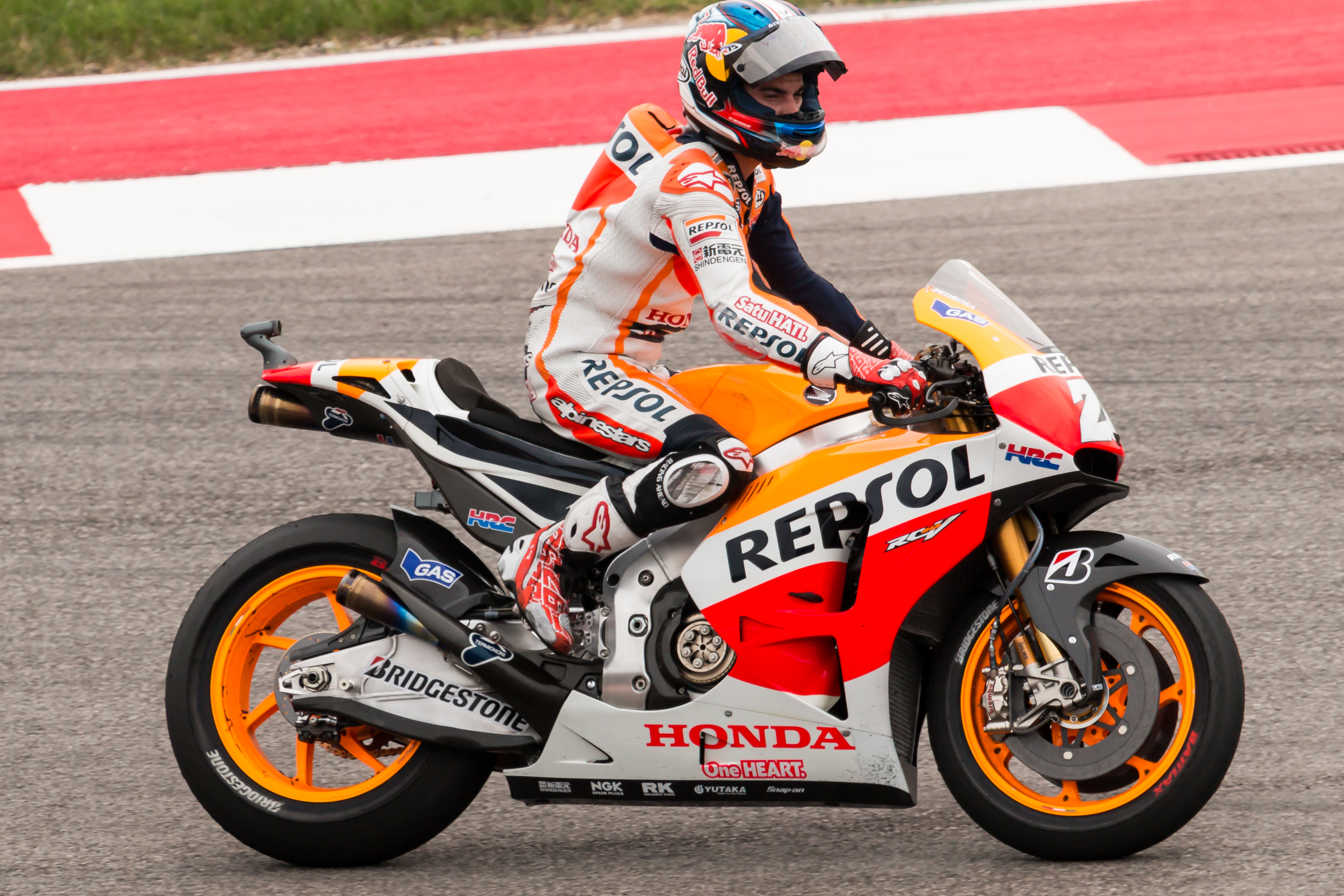
Pedrosa at the 2014 Motorcycle Grand Prix of the Americas

Pedrosa remained with Repsol Honda into the 2014 season, again partnering Márquez and started the season positively, by recording four consecutive podium finishes. His first victory of the season came in the Czech Republic, ending the ten-race winning streak that Márquez had been on, since the start of the season. He was involved in a three-way rivalry with Yamaha riders Lorenzo and Rossi to finish as the overall championship runner-up, but had to settle for fourth place after failing to score any points in the races at Phillip Island and Sepang.

==== 2015 ====
Pedrosa remained with Repsol Honda into the 2015 season, and took a sixth-place finish in the opening race in Qatar. Thereafter, he missed the races in Texas, Argentina and Spain, after electing to undergo surgery to alleviate issues with arm-pump. Pedrosa returned to racing at Le Mans but he crashed at the Dunlop chicane; he remounted and could only finish in sixteenth place, before he finished in fourth place at Mugello. Pedrosa claimed his first podium of the season at the Catalan Grand Prix, finishing third behind the Yamahas of Jorge Lorenzo and Valentino Rossi, before he finished in eighth place at Assen.

Pedrosa finished second behind teammate Márquez in Germany. Pedrosa achieved his first victory of the season – the fiftieth of his career, becoming the eighth rider to reach that mark – in drying conditions at Motegi. The victory ensured that Pedrosa completed a fourteenth successive season with at least one win. He added a second win in Malaysia. Pedrosa finished fourth in the championship standings.

==== 2016 ====
Pedrosa remained with Repsol Honda for the 2016 season. Despite a difficult season, struggling with the Michelin tires and with an RC213V that he found difficult to ride, he was able to score in every race he finished and to maintain his streak of winning at least one race in each of the eleven seasons (2006-2016) that he has competed in the premier class.

Pedrosa began the season with a fifth-place finish in Qatar, and placed in the top five in each of the first seven rounds apart from Texas (where a crash with Ducati's Andrea Dovizioso took both riders out of the race), with third place podium finishes in Argentina and Catalunya. Pedrosa struggled with setup and the Michelin tires through the next several cold and rain-hit rounds. He returned to the top five in Great Britain and achieved his first and only win of the season with a strong performance at Misano. A highside crash in free practice 2 at Motegi essentially ended Pedrosa's season, with a fractured right collarbone, right fibula, and left foot causing him to miss the three flyaway races while undergoing and recovering from the 14th major surgery of his career. He returned for the final race of the season but crashed out of the race. Pedrosa finished sixth in the championship standings, his worst finish to a season since his rookie year in the premier class.

==== 2017 ====
Pedrosa was contracted to continue racing for Repsol Honda for 2017 and 2018. In 2017, Pedrosa achieved two wins (Spain & Valencia) and a further seven podium finishes to ultimately finish the championship in fourth position with 210 points.

==== 2018 ====
Pedrosa completed a difficult season in 2018, achieving no wins and no podiums for the first time in his MotoGP career. He finished the season in 11th position of the riders' championship, his worst-ever result and only second time outside of the top five. Following the fact that Honda didn't renew his contract for the 2019 season, with Jorge Lorenzo taking his place, Pedrosa announced in a press conference at the German Grand Prix on 12 July that he would retire from the MotoGP world championship by the end of 2018.

=== Post-motorcycle racing career ===
In late October 2018, it was confirmed Pedrosa signed for the KTM Factory Racing team as a development test rider for 2019 and 2020, shockingly ending his long association with Honda. He initially dismissed notions of making wildcard entries to races with KTM, as is often typical for development riders, and even refused to replace Johann Zarco for the remainder of the 2019 season after the Frenchman's sudden decision to end his contract at KTM. Pedrosa later softened this stance in early 2020, saying "he would now consider a return to MotoGP as a wildcard entrant, should KTM require him to test the RC16 in race conditions." Due to the COVID-19 pandemic response, wildcard entries were later forbidden for the 2020 season, in order to minimize paddock personnel. After the restriction was lifted, Pedrosa made his return to the MotoGP grid as a wildcard entry at the 2021 Styrian motorcycle Grand Prix, finishing in tenth place.

==== Sportscar racing ====
In March 2022, Pedrosa was announced to be competing in three rounds of the 2022 Lamborghini Super Trofeo Europe with the Rexal FFF Racing Team, driving the No. 29 Lamborghini Huracán in what would be his first foray into automobile racing. Swiss endurance racing driver Antonin Borga was also announced as his co-driver; he would compete in the Pro-Am class of the championship.

Pedrosa and Borga qualified fifth in the first race at Imola and finished ninth in his class and 19th overall; in the second race, he qualified 21st but finished fourth in his class and eighth overall. Pedrosa and Borga would fail to finish the next two races, both due to collisions.

Pedrosa returned to action at the final rounds of the championship in Portimão. After a sixth place in the first race, Pedrosa and Borga finished second in the second race, securing Pedrosa's first podium finish in the series. Pedrosa and Borga would finish third in the Pro-Am standings.

After finishing his first season in Lamborghini Super Trofeo, Pedrosa stated that he had no current plans to continue racing in the series, although he was open to offers; he reiterated that he feels that he is "far from the level required to compete in GT3 machinery", but he felt he would "do well in a prototype".

Pedrosa competed at the fifth round of the 2023 GT2 European Series at the Circuit Ricardo Tormo, driving the No. 17 KTM X-Bow GT2 for KTM True Racing by Reiter Engineering. Pedrosa would finish eleventh in the first race and seventh in the second race.

=== Injuries ===
Throughout his World Championship career, Pedrosa has been plagued by injuries, and has a high injury per crash ratio compared to other top riders. These injuries has often prevented him from clean seasons that would allow a shot at the title.

- 2003 Australian motorcycle Grand Prix (125cc) Double fracture in the talus bone of the left foot and a fracture of the right ankle.
- 2005 Japanese motorcycle Grand Prix (250cc) Fracture of the left humeral head that affected the supraspinal tendon.
- 2006 Malaysian motorcycle Grand Prix (MotoGP) Small fracture of the small left toe and loss of cutaneous matter on the right knee. 5 stitches in that vertical cut.
- 2007 Turkish motorcycle Grand Prix (MotoGP) Thoracic trauma, blow to the left gluteus and neck trauma.
- 2007 Japanese motorcycle Grand Prix (MotoGP) Post-traumatic arthritis with inflammation to the small toe of the left foot.
- 2008 Sepang test (MotoGP) Fracture of the second metacarpal in the right hand, with three diaphyseal fragments, which are the bones that are found in the middle part of the metacarpus.
- 2008 German motorcycle Grand Prix (MotoGP) General inflammation of the left hand with hematomas in the veins of the extensor tendons. Displaced fracture of the distal phalanx of the left index finger. A sprain of the interphalangeal articulation next to the left middle finger. Fracture of the large bone of the left wrist. Sprain of the lateral external ligament of the right ankle.
- 2008 Australian motorcycle Grand Prix (MotoGP) Capsular hematoma on the left knee that had to be treated two months after.
- 2009 Qatar test (MotoGP) Fracture of the radius of the left arm and contusion on the left knee that required a skin graft, because the scar re-opened from an operation before Christmas.
- 2009 Italian motorcycle Grand Prix (MotoGP) Incomplete fracture of the greater trochanter of the right femur. A fracture without displacement, an injury that requires absolute rest and treatment with painkillers.
- 2009 December (MotoGP) Underwent an operation to remove a screw from his left wrist.
- 2010 Japanese motorcycle Grand Prix (MotoGP) Four-fragment chip fracture of the left collarbone and a Grade 1 ankle sprain.
- 2011 French motorcycle Grand Prix (MotoGP) Fractured right collarbone.
- 2013 German motorcycle Grand Prix (MotoGP) Small fracture of left collarbone.
- 2015 Qatar motorcycle Grand Prix (MotoGP) Arm pump of right hand.
- 2016 Japanese motorcycle Grand Prix (MotoGP) Fracture of right collarbone consisting of four fragments, requiring surgery (the 14th major surgery of his career). Subcapital fracture of the right fibula with no displacement, requiring only immobilization. Fracture to the fourth metatarsal of the left foot.
- 2018 Argentine motorcycle Grand Prix (MotoGP) Fracture of the right wrist, requiring surgery to repair.
- 2019 January (Test rider) Right collarbone fracture due to weakness from previous breaks.

== Career statistics ==
=== Grand Prix motorcycle racing ===
==== By season ====
Season	Class	Motorcycle	Team	Race	Win	Podium	Pole	FLap	Pts	Plcd	WCh
2001	125cc	Honda RS125R	Telefónica MoviStar Junior Team	16	0	2	0	0	100	8th	–
2002	125cc	Honda RS125R	Telefónica MoviStar Junior Team	16	3	9	6	2	243	**3rd**	–
2003	125cc	Honda RS125R	Telefónica MoviStar Junior Team	14	5	6	3	3	223	**1st**	1
2004	250cc	Honda RS250RW	Telefónica MoviStar Honda 250cc	16	7	13	4	8	317	**1st**	1
2005	250cc	Honda RS250RW	Telefónica Movistar Honda 250cc	16	8	11	5	7	309	**1st**	1
2006	MotoGP	Honda RC211V	Repsol Honda Team	17	2	8	4	4	215	5th	–
2007	MotoGP	Honda RC212V	Repsol Honda Team	18	2	8	5	3	242	**2nd**	–
2008	MotoGP	Honda RC212V	Repsol Honda Team	17	2	11	2	2	249	**3rd**	–
2009	MotoGP	Honda RC212V	Repsol Honda Team	17	2	11	2	5	234	**3rd**	–
2010	MotoGP	Honda RC212V	Repsol Honda Team	15	4	9	4	8	245	**2nd**	–
2011	MotoGP	Honda RC212V	Repsol Honda Team	14	3	9	2	4	219	4th	–
2012	MotoGP	Honda RC213V	Repsol Honda Team	18	7	15	5	9	332	**2nd**	–
2013	MotoGP	Honda RC213V	Repsol Honda Team	17	3	13	2	4	300	**3rd**	–
2014	MotoGP	Honda RC213V	Repsol Honda Team	18	1	10	1	2	246	4th	–
2015	MotoGP	Honda RC213V	Repsol Honda Team	15	2	6	1	0	206	4th	–
2016	MotoGP	Honda RC213V	Repsol Honda Team	15	1	3	0	1	155	6th	–
2017	MotoGP	Honda RC213V	Repsol Honda Team	18	2	9	3	2	210	4th	–
2018	MotoGP	Honda RC213V	Repsol Honda Team	18	0	0	0	0	117	11th	–
2021	MotoGP	KTM RC16	Red Bull KTM Factory Racing	1	0	0	0	0	6	25th	–
2023	MotoGP	KTM RC16	Red Bull KTM Factory Racing	2	0	0	0	0	32	21st	
2024	MotoGP	KTM RC16	Red Bull KTM Factory Racing	1	0	0	0	0	7	24th	–
Total				**299**	**54**	**153**	**49**	**64**	**4207**		**3**

==== By class ====
Class	Seasons	1st GP	1st Pod	1st Win	Race	Win	Podiums	Pole	FLap	Pts	WChmp
125cc	2001–2003	2001 Japan	2001 Valencia	2002 Netherlands	46	8	17	9	5	566	1
250cc	2004–2005	2004 South Africa	2004 South Africa	2004 South Africa	32	15	24	9	15	626	2
MotoGP	2006–2018, 2021, 2023–2024	2006 Spain	2006 Spain	2006 China	221	31	112	31	44	3015	0
Total	2001–2018, 2021, 2023–2024				**299**	**54**	**153**	**49**	**64**	**4207**	**3**

==== Races by year ====
(key) (Races in bold indicate pole position; races in italics indicate fastest lap)

Year	Class	Bike	1	2	3	4	5	6	7	8	9	10	11	12	13	14	15	16	17	18	19	20	Pos	Pts
2001	125cc	Honda	JPN; 18	RSA; 13	SPA; 10	FRA; 17	ITA; 23	CAT; 7	NED; Ret	GBR; 12	GER; 11	CZE; 8	POR; 5	VAL; 3	PAC; 3	AUS; 7	MAL; 4	BRA; Ret					8th	100
2002	125cc	Honda	**JPN**; 8	**RSA**; 3	SPA; 4	FRA; 3	ITA; 4	CAT; 2	**NED**; 1	GBR; 2	GER; 7	CZE; 2	**POR**; 10	BRA; Ret	**PAC**; 1	MAL; 3	AUS; 5	**VAL**; 1					**3rd**	**243**
2003	125cc	Honda	JPN; 8	RSA; 1	SPA; 4	FRA; 1	ITA; 2	CAT; 1	**NED**; 8	GBR; Ret	GER; 4	CZE; 1	POR; 4	**BRA**; 4	**PAC**; 6	MAL; 1	AUS; WD	VAL					**1st**	**223**
2004	250cc	Honda	RSA; 1	SPA; Ret	**FRA**; 1	ITA; 2	CAT; 2	NED; 2	BRA; 2	GER; 1	GBR; 1	CZE; 3	**POR**; 4	**JPN**; 1	QAT; 2	MAL; 1	AUS; 4	**VAL**; 1					**1st**	**317**
2005	250cc	Honda	**SPA**; 1	POR; 4	CHN; 6	**FRA**; 1	ITA; 1	**CAT**; 1	NED; 2	**GBR**; 4	GER; 1	CZE; 1	JPN; 2	MAL; Ret	QAT; 4	AUS; 1	TUR; 2	**VAL**; 1					**1st**	**309**
2006	MotoGP	Honda	SPA; 2	QAT; 6	TUR; 14	**CHN**; 1	**FRA**; 3	ITA; 4	CAT; Ret	NED; 3	**GBR**; 1	**GER**; 4	USA; 2	CZE; 3	MAL; 3	AUS; 15	JPN; 7	POR; Ret	VAL; 4				5th	215
2007	MotoGP	Honda	QAT; 3	**SPA**; 2	TUR; Ret	CHN; 4	FRA; 4	ITA; 2	CAT; 3	GBR; 8	NED; 4	GER; 1	USA; 5	CZE; 4	RSM; Ret	POR; 2	**JPN**; Ret	**AUS**; 4	**MAL**; 3	**VAL**; 1			**2nd**	**242**
2008	MotoGP	Honda	QAT; 3	SPA; 1	POR; 2	CHN; 2	**FRA**; 4	ITA; 3	CAT; 1	GBR; 3	NED; 2	GER; Ret	USA; WD	CZE; 15	RSM; 4	INP; 8	JPN; 3	AUS; Ret	**MAL**; 2	VAL; 2			**3rd**	**249**
2009	MotoGP	Honda	QAT; 11	JPN; 3	SPA; 2	**FRA**; 3	ITA; Ret	CAT; 6	NED; Ret	USA; 1	GER; 3	GBR; 9	CZE; 2	**INP**; 10	RSM; 3	POR; 3	AUS; 3	MAL; 2	VAL; 1				**3rd**	**234**
2010	MotoGP	Honda	QAT; 7	**SPA**; 2	FRA; 5	**ITA**; 1	GBR; 8	NED; 2	CAT; 2	GER; 1	USA; Ret	**CZE**; 2	INP; 1	**RSM**; 1	ARA; 2	JPN; DNS	MAL	AUS; DNS	POR; 8	VAL; 7			**2nd**	**245**
2011	MotoGP	Honda	QAT; 3	SPA; 2	POR; 1	FRA; Ret	CAT	GBR	NED	ITA; 8	GER; 1	USA; 3	**CZE**; Ret	INP; 2	RSM; 2	ARA; 2	JPN; 1	AUS; 4	**MAL**; C	VAL; 5			4th	219
2012	MotoGP	Honda	QAT; 2	SPA; 3	POR; 3	**FRA**; 4	CAT; 2	GBR; 3	NED; 2	GER; 1	**ITA**; 2	USA; 3	**INP**; 1	CZE; 1	**RSM**; Ret	ARA; 1	JPN; 1	MAL; 1	AUS; Ret	**VAL**; 1			**2nd**	**332**
2013	MotoGP	Honda	QAT; 4	AME; 2	SPA; 1	FRA; 1	**ITA**; 2	**CAT**; 2	NED; 4	GER; DNS	USA; 5	INP; 2	CZE; 2	GBR; 3	RSM; 3	ARA; Ret	MAL; 1	AUS; 2	JPN; 3	VAL; 2			**3rd**	**300**
2014	MotoGP	Honda	QAT; 3	AME; 2	ARG; 2	SPA; 3	FRA; 5	ITA; 4	**CAT**; 3	NED; 3	GER; 2	INP; 4	CZE; 1	GBR; 4	RSM; 3	ARA; 14	JPN; 4	AUS; Ret	MAL; Ret	VAL; 3			4th	246
2015	MotoGP	Honda	QAT; 6	AME	ARG	SPA	FRA; 16	ITA; 4	CAT; 3	NED; 8	GER; 2	INP; 4	CZE; 5	GBR; 5	RSM; 9	ARA; 2	JPN; 1	AUS; 5	**MAL**; 1	VAL; 3			4th	206
2016	MotoGP	Honda	QAT; 5	ARG; 3	AME; Ret	SPA; 4	FRA; 4	ITA; 4	CAT; 3	NED; 12	GER; 6	AUT; 7	CZE; 12	GBR; 5	RSM; 1	ARA; 6	JPN; WD	AUS	MAL	VAL; Ret			6th	155
2017	MotoGP	Honda	QAT; 5	ARG; Ret	AME; 3	**SPA**; 1	FRA; 3	ITA; Ret	**CAT**; 3	NED; 13	GER; 3	CZE; 2	AUT; 3	GBR; 7	RSM; 14	ARA; 2	JPN; Ret	AUS; 12	**MAL**; 5	VAL; 1			4th	210
2018	MotoGP	Honda	QAT; 7	ARG; Ret	AME; 7	SPA; Ret	FRA; 5	ITA; Ret	CAT; 5	NED; 15	GER; 8	CZE; 8	AUT; 7	GBR; C	RSM; 6	ARA; 5	THA; Ret	JPN; 8	AUS; Ret	MAL; 5	VAL; 5		11th	117
2021	MotoGP	KTM	QAT	DOH	POR	SPA	FRA	ITA	CAT	GER	NED	STY; 10	AUT	GBR	ARA	RSM	AME	EMI	ALR	VAL			25th	6
2023	MotoGP	KTM	POR	ARG	AME	SPA; 7**^{6}**	FRA	ITA	GER	NED	GBR	AUT	CAT	RSM; 4^{4}	IND	JPN	INA	AUS	THA	MAL	QAT	VAL	21st	32
2024	MotoGP	KTM	QAT	POR	AME	SPA; Ret**^{3}**	FRA	CAT	ITA	NED	GER	GBR	AUT	ARA	RSM	EMI	INA	JPN	AUS	THA	MAL	SLD	24th	7

* Season still in progress.

== Car racing records ==
=== Career summary ===
Season	Series	Car	Team	Races	Wins	Poles	F/laps	Podiums	Points	Position
2022	Lamborghini Super Trofeo Europe	Lamborghini Huracán Super Trofeo EVO2	Rexal FFF Racing Team	6	0	0	0	1	?	?
2023	GT2 European Series	KTM X-Bow GT2	KTM True Racing with Reiter Engineering	2	0	0	0	0	12	13th
Total				NA						

=== Complete Lamborghini Super Trofeo Europe results ===
Year	Team	Co-Driver	Car	Class	1	2	3	4	5	6	7	8	9	10	11	12	Pos.	Pts.	Class Pos.	Pts.
2022	(China) Rexal FFF Racing Team	(Switzerland) Antonin Borga	Lamborghini Huracán Super Trofeo EVO2	Pro-Am	IMO1; 9	IMO2; 4	PAU1	PAU2	MIS1; Ret	MIS2; Ret	SPA1	SPA2	CAT1	CAT2	POR1; 6	POR2; 2	?	?	3rd	?

=== Complete GT2 European Series results ===
Year	Team	Car	Class	1	2	3	4	5	6	7	8	9	10	11	12	Pos.	Pts.
2023	(Austria) KTM True Racing with Reiter Engineering	KTM X-Bow GT2	Pro-Am	MNZ1	MNZ2	RBR1	RBR2	DIJ1	DIJ2	POR1	POR2	VAL1; 11	VAL2; 7	LEC1	LEC2	13th	12
