= 2006 Portuguese motorcycle Grand Prix =

(Portugal) 2006 Portuguese Grand Prix
Race details
- Race 16 of 17 races in the 2006 Grand Prix motorcycle racing season
- Date: 15 October 2006
- Official name: bwin.com Grande Prémio de Portugal
- Location: Autódromo do Estoril
- Course: Permanent racing facility; 4.182 km (2.599 mi)

MotoGP
Pole position
- Rider: (Italy) Valentino Rossi
- Time: 1:36.200
Fastest lap
- Rider: (United States) Kenny Roberts Jr.
- Time: 1:37.914
Podium
- First: (Spain) Toni Elías
- Second: (Italy) Valentino Rossi
- Third: (United States) Kenny Roberts Jr.

250cc
Pole position
- Rider: (Italy) Roberto Locatelli
- Time: 1:41.511
Fastest lap
- Rider: (Japan) Hiroshi Aoyama
- Time: 1:41.676
Podium
- First: (Italy) Andrea Dovizioso
- Second: (Japan) Hiroshi Aoyama
- Third: (San Marino) Alex de Angelis

125cc
Pole position
- Rider: (Spain) Álvaro Bautista
- Time: 1:45.322
Fastest lap
- Rider: (Spain) Álvaro Bautista
- Time: 1:45.746
Podium
- First: (Spain) Álvaro Bautista
- Second: (Spain) Héctor Faubel
- Third: (Finland) Mika Kallio

The 2006 Portuguese motorcycle Grand Prix was the sixteenth race of the 2006 Motorcycle Grand Prix season. It took place on the weekend of 13–15 October 2006 at the Estoril circuit. This was the last race won by a non-factory team before the 2016 Dutch TT.

== MotoGP classification ==
Pos.	No.	Rider	Team	Manufacturer	Laps	Time/Retired	Grid	Points
1	24	(Spain) Toni Elías	Fortuna Honda	Honda	28	46:08.739	11	25
2	46	(Italy) Valentino Rossi	Camel Yamaha Team	Yamaha	28	+0.002	1	20
3	10	(United States) Kenny Roberts Jr.	Team Roberts	KR211V	28	+0.176	13	16
4	5	(United States) Colin Edwards	Camel Yamaha Team	Yamaha	28	+0.864	2	13
5	6	(Japan) Makoto Tamada	Konica Minolta Honda	Honda	28	+18.419	14	11
6	21	(United States) John Hopkins	Rizla Suzuki MotoGP	Suzuki	28	+25.181	6	10
7	7	(Spain) Carlos Checa	Tech 3 Yamaha	Yamaha	28	+29.348	9	9
8	33	(Italy) Marco Melandri	Fortuna Honda	Honda	28	+31.813	15	8
9	71	(Australia) Chris Vermeulen	Rizla Suzuki MotoGP	Suzuki	28	+40.117	12	7
10	17	(France) Randy de Puniet	Kawasaki Racing Team	Kawasaki	28	+41.496	16	6
11	66	(Germany) Alex Hofmann	Pramac d'Antin MotoGP	Ducati	28	+41.533	18	5
12	65	(Italy) Loris Capirossi	Ducati Marlboro Team	Ducati	28	+44.776	10	4
13	77	(United Kingdom) James Ellison	Tech 3 Yamaha	Yamaha	28	+1:19.113	17	3
14	30	(Spain) José Luis Cardoso	Pramac d'Antin MotoGP	Ducati	28	+1:40.716	19	2
15	8	(Australia) Garry McCoy	Ilmor SRT	Ilmor X3	24	+4 laps	20	1
Ret	69	(United States) Nicky Hayden	Repsol Honda Team	Honda	4	Accident	3	
Ret	26	(Spain) Dani Pedrosa	Repsol Honda Team	Honda	4	Accident	4	
Ret	27	(Australia) Casey Stoner	Honda LCR	Honda	1	Accident	5	
Ret	15	(Spain) Sete Gibernau	Ducati Marlboro Team	Ducati	1	Accident	8	
Ret	56	(Japan) Shinya Nakano	Kawasaki Racing Team	Kawasaki	0	Accident	7	

== 250 cc classification ==
Pos.	No.	Rider	Manufacturer	Laps	Time/Retired	Grid	Points
1	34	(Italy) Andrea Dovizioso	Honda	26	44:30.727	7	25
2	4	(Japan) Hiroshi Aoyama	KTM	26	+0.015	2	20
3	7	(San Marino) Alex de Angelis	Aprilia	26	+0.348	6	16
4	15	(Italy) Roberto Locatelli	Aprilia	26	+1.842	1	13
5	48	(Spain) Jorge Lorenzo	Aprilia	26	+6.402	4	11
6	55	(Japan) Yuki Takahashi	Honda	26	+9.619	12	10
7	58	(Italy) Marco Simoncelli	Gilera	26	+14.303	3	9
8	50	(France) Sylvain Guintoli	Aprilia	26	+17.222	10	8
9	14	(Australia) Anthony West	Aprilia	26	+34.819	11	7
10	80	(Spain) Héctor Barberá	Aprilia	26	+37.976	5	6
11	96	(Czech Republic) Jakub Smrž	Aprilia	26	+41.584	15	5
12	54	(San Marino) Manuel Poggiali	KTM	26	+42.929	18	4
13	42	(Spain) Aleix Espargaró	Honda	26	+43.022	8	3
14	52	(Spain) José David de Gea	Honda	26	+43.040	13	2
15	8	(Italy) Andrea Ballerini	Aprilia	26	+43.935	16	1
16	28	(Germany) Dirk Heidolf	Aprilia	26	+59.454	17	
17	37	(Argentina) Fabricio Perren	Honda	26	+1:10.952	20	
18	44	(Japan) Taro Sekiguchi	Aprilia	26	+1:15.390	19	
19	24	(Spain) Jordi Carchano	Aprilia	26	+1:17.577	21	
20	23	(Spain) Arturo Tizón	Honda	26	+1:32.205	23	
21	22	(Italy) Luca Morelli	Aprilia	25	+1 lap	22	
22	85	(Italy) Alessio Palumbo	Aprilia	25	+1 lap	26	
23	75	(United Kingdom) Luke Lawrence	Yamaha	25	+1 lap	29	
24	32	(Portugal) João Fernandes	Aprilia	24	+2 laps	27	
Ret	25	(Italy) Alex Baldolini	Aprilia	25	Accident	14	
Ret	73	(Japan) Shuhei Aoyama	Honda	15	Retirement	9	
Ret	16	(France) Jules Cluzel	Aprilia	13	Accident	24	
Ret	45	(United Kingdom) Dan Linfoot	Honda	11	Retirement	28	
Ret	65	(Italy) Alessandro Brannetti	Honda	4	Retirement	25	
DNQ	59	(China) Ho Chi Fung	Aprilia		Did not qualify		
DNQ	56	(China) Su Rong Zai	Aprilia		Did not qualify		

== 125 cc classification ==
Pos.	No.	Rider	Manufacturer	Laps	Time/Retired	Grid	Points
1	19	(Spain) Álvaro Bautista	Aprilia	23	40:48.792	1	25
2	55	(Spain) Héctor Faubel	Aprilia	23	+15.098	2	20
3	36	(Finland) Mika Kallio	KTM	23	+15.112	11	16
4	52	(Czech Republic) Lukáš Pešek	Derbi	23	+15.745	3	13
5	60	(Spain) Julián Simón	KTM	23	+15.778	4	11
6	71	(Japan) Tomoyoshi Koyama	Malaguti	23	+27.588	7	10
7	32	(Italy) Fabrizio Lai	Honda	23	+27.609	6	9
8	14	(Hungary) Gábor Talmácsi	Honda	23	+27.652	8	8
9	24	(Italy) Simone Corsi	Gilera	23	+31.877	18	7
10	11	(Germany) Sandro Cortese	Honda	23	+38.878	15	6
11	44	(Czech Republic) Karel Abraham	Aprilia	23	+39.265	10	5
12	42	(Spain) Pol Espargaró	Derbi	23	+44.501	23	4
13	8	(Italy) Lorenzo Zanetti	Aprilia	23	+44.543	22	3
14	12	(Italy) Federico Sandi	Aprilia	23	+46.069	21	2
15	33	(Spain) Sergio Gadea	Aprilia	23	+48.087	12	1
16	54	(Switzerland) Randy Krummenacher	KTM	23	+59.731	27	
17	34	(Spain) Esteve Rabat	Honda	23	+59.788	19	
18	45	(Hungary) Imre Tóth	Aprilia	23	+1:07.489	17	
19	35	(Italy) Raffaele De Rosa	Aprilia	23	+1:07.519	26	
20	49	(Japan) Kazuma Watanabe	Honda	23	+1:21.367	34	
21	16	(Italy) Michele Conti	Honda	23	+1:21.417	32	
22	13	(Italy) Dino Lombardi	Aprilia	23	+1:26.874	40	
23	21	(Spain) Mateo Túnez	Aprilia	23	+1:29.379	36	
24	43	(Spain) Manuel Hernández	Aprilia	23	+1:29.402	29	
25	37	(Netherlands) Joey Litjens	Honda	23	+1:29.420	35	
26	25	(Switzerland) Dominique Aegerter	Aprilia	23	+1:30.416	28	
27	67	(Australia) Blake Leigh-Smith	KTM	23	+1:33.029	33	
28	73	(Japan) Kazuya Otani	Malaguti	23	+1:33.112	39	
29	95	(Germany) Georg Fröhlich	Honda	23	+1:33.183	38	
30	69	(Czech Republic) Michal Šembera	Honda	22	+1 lap	41	
Ret	18	(Spain) Nicolás Terol	Derbi	19	Retirement	13	
Ret	20	(Italy) Roberto Tamburini	Aprilia	19	Accident	24	
Ret	53	(Italy) Simone Grotzkyj	Aprilia	19	Retirement	31	
Ret	90	(Japan) Hiroaki Kuzuhara	Aprilia	19	Retirement	30	
Ret	38	(United Kingdom) Bradley Smith	Honda	15	Accident	20	
Ret	75	(Italy) Mattia Pasini	Aprilia	12	Retirement	5	
Ret	9	(Austria) Michael Ranseder	KTM	10	Accident	25	
Ret	6	(Spain) Joan Olivé	Aprilia	3	Accident	14	
Ret	1	(Switzerland) Thomas Lüthi	Honda	3	Accident	16	
Ret	63	(France) Mike Di Meglio	Honda	1	Accident	9	
DNS	87	(Italy) Roberto Lacalendola	Aprilia	0	Did not start	37	
DNS	22	(Spain) Pablo Nieto	Aprilia		Did not start		

== Championship standings after the race (MotoGP) ==
Below are the standings for the top five riders and constructors after round sixteen has concluded.

Riders' Championship standings

Pos.	Rider	Points
1	(Italy) Valentino Rossi	244
2	(United States) Nicky Hayden	236
3	(Italy) Marco Melandri	217
4	(Italy) Loris Capirossi	209
5	(Spain) Dani Pedrosa	202

Constructors' Championship standings

Pos.	Constructor	Points
1	(Japan) Honda	344
2	(Japan) Yamaha	282
3	(Italy) Ducati	223
4	(Japan) Suzuki	146
5	(United States) KR211V	126

- Note: Only the top five positions are included for both sets of standings.

Previous race: 2006 Japanese Grand Prix	FIM Grand Prix World Championship; 2006 season	Next race: 2006 Valencian Grand Prix
Previous race: 2005 Portuguese Grand Prix	Portuguese motorcycle Grand Prix	Next race: 2007 Portuguese Grand Prix
