= Ho Chi Fung =

Chinese motorcycle racer

- Nationality: (China) Chinese
- Born: 17 September 1976 (age 50); Sanshui, China
Motorcycle racing career statistics
250cc World Championship
Active years	2006
Manufacturers	Aprilia
2006 championship position	NC (0 pts)
Starts / Wins / Podiums / Poles / F. laps / Points; 2 / 0 / 0 / 0 / 0 / 0

Ho Chi Fung (simplified Chinese: 何智锋; traditional Chinese: 何智鋒; pinyin: Hé Zhìfēng; born September 17, 1976) is a Chinese Grand Prix motorcycle racer. He won the 2013 FIM eRoad Racing World Cup.

== Career statistics ==
=== By season ===
Season	Class	Motorcycle	Team	Race	Win	Podium	Pole	FLap	Pts	Plcd
2006	250cc	Aprilia	China Zongshen Team	2	0	0	0	0	0	NC
Total				2	0	0	0	0	0	

=== Races by year ===
(key)

Year	Class	Bike	1	2	3	4	5	6	7	8	9	10	11	12	13	14	15	16	Pos.	Pts
2006	250cc	Aprilia	SPA	QAT	TUR	CHN; Ret	FRA	ITA	CAT	NED	GBR	GER	CZE	MAL; 16	AUS	JPN	POR; DNQ	VAL	NC	0

=== FIM eRoad Racing World Cup ===
Year	Team	1	2	3	4	Pos	Pts
2013	Zongshen	ESP1; 1	ESP2; Ret	GER; 1	FRA; 1	1st	75
