= Laguna Seca =

Motorsport track in the United States

WeatherTech Raceway Laguna Seca

- Grand Prix Circuit (1996–present)
- Location: Monterey County, near Monterey, California, and Salinas, California, United States
- Coordinates: 36°35′03″N 121°45′13″W
- FIA Grade: 2
- Owner: Monterey County
- Operator: Friends of Laguna Seca
- Broke ground: 1957
- Opened: 9 November 1957; 69 years ago
- Construction cost: $1.5 million USD
- Architect: Wallace Holm
- Former names: Mazda Raceway Laguna Seca (2002–2017); Laguna Seca Raceway (1957–2001)
- Major events: Current: IndyCar Series IndyCar Grand Prix of Monterey (1960–2004, 2019, 2021–present); IMSA SportsCar Championship Monterey SportsCar Championship (1957, 1963–1968, 1974–1987, 1989, 1991–1994, 1997–present); MotoAmerica (1976–1988, 1992–present); Monterey Motorsports Reunion (1974–2019, 2021–present); Future: Trans-Am Series (1969–1972, 1978–1982, 2000–2001, 2004, 2019, 2021–2022, 2025, 2027) Former: World SBK (1995–2004, 2013–2019); Intercontinental GT Challenge California 8 Hours (2017–2019); GT World Challenge America (1990, 1999–2007, 2009, 2011–2012, 2015–2019); Grand Prix motorcycle racing United States motorcycle Grand Prix (1988–1991, 1993–1994, 2005–2013); SCCA National Championship Runoffs (2014); FIA GT Championship (1997–1998); NASCAR Winston West Series NASCAR Challenge Salinas 250 (1973, 1975–1977, 1980–1981, 2000–2001)
- Website: Official website

Grand Prix Circuit (1996–present)
- Surface: Paved
- Length: 2.238 mi (3.602 km)
- Turns: 11
- Race lap record: 1:08.4168 ( (Spain) Álex Palou, Dallara IR-18, 2023, IndyCar)

Grand Prix Circuit (1988–1995)
- Length: 2.214 mi (3.563 km)
- Turns: 11
- Race lap record: 1:12.959 ( (Canada) Paul Tracy, Penske PC-23, 1994, CART)

Original Circuit (1957–1987)
- Length: 1.900 mi (3.058 km)
- Turns: 9
- Race lap record: 0:56.810 ( (United States) Al Unser Jr., Frissbee GR3, 1982, Can-Am)

Laguna Seca Raceway (branded as WeatherTech Raceway Laguna Seca, and previously Mazda Raceway Laguna Seca for sponsorship reasons) is a paved road racing track near both Salinas and Monterey, California, United States. It was built in 1957 and is used for both auto racing and motorcycle racing.

The racetrack is 2.238 mi (3.602 km) long, with a 180 ft (55 m) elevation change. Its eleven turns are highlighted by the circuit's signature turn, the downhill-plunging "Corkscrew" at Turns 8 and 8A. A variety of racing, exhibition, and entertainment events are held at the raceway, ranging from superkarts to sports car racing to music festivals. Laguna Seca is classified as an FIA Grade Two circuit.

The name Laguna Seca is Spanish for dry lake: the area where the track now lies was once a lake, and the course was built around the dry lake bed. After the course was reconfigured, two artificial ponds were added. The track is featured in Polyphony Digital’s Gran Turismo games.

== History ==
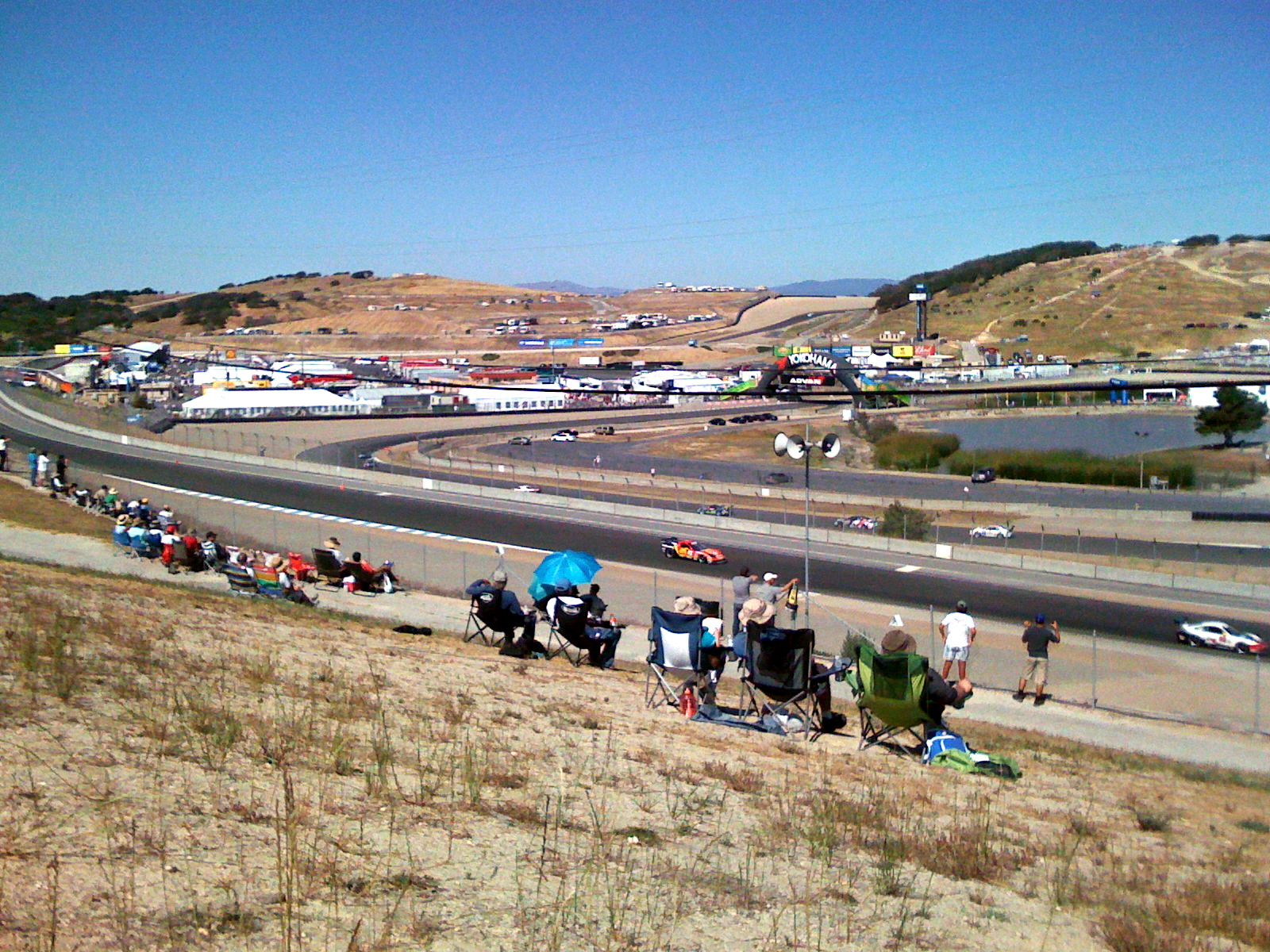
Laguna Seca Raceway from between Turns 1 and 2

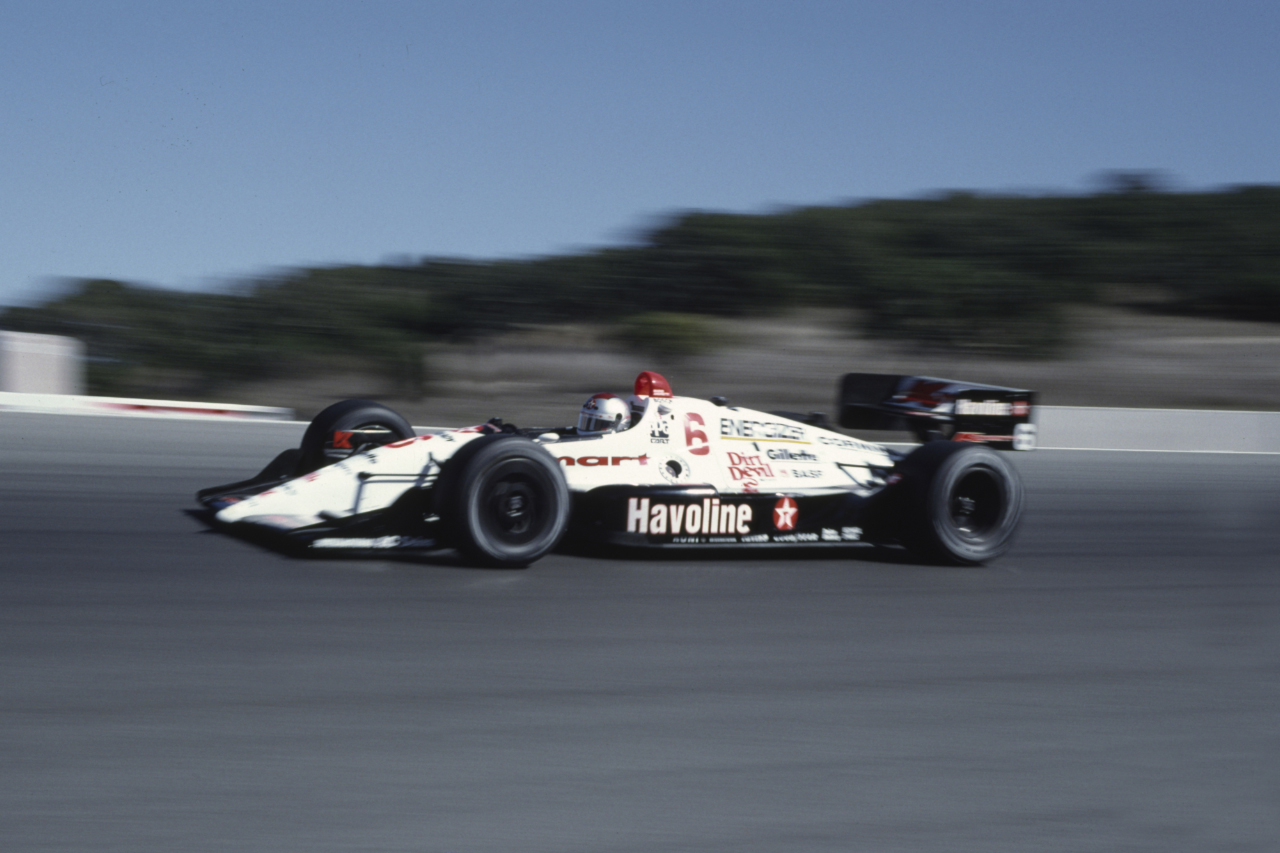
Mario Andretti at Laguna Seca, 1991

The earliest development of the local area occurred in 1867 with the founding of the nearby Laguna Seca Ranch, which has operated continuously for 140 years with grazing and equestrian uses.

The track was built in 1957 at a cost of $1.5 million raised from local businesses and individuals on part of the US Army's Fort Ord (a maneuver area and field artillery target range) after the nearby Pebble Beach Road Races were abandoned for being too dangerous. In 1974 the property was deeded over to the Monterey County Parks Department and continues to be part of the park system.

The lead designer of the track was the young architect Wallace Holm who served as Chairman of the Site Development and Maintenance Committee for SCRAMP. When the bulldozers came in, he drew the path out on the dirt, and then walked around in a circle to show them where to go. He said: "..like any young architect, I envisioned something as grand as the Empire State Building, but it didn’t just happen that way. Like many things that happen in life, the race track was created by committee." Wallace Holm was the owner of Wallace Holm & Associates, later Wallace Holm Architects, who also designed the Aguajito Road County Courthouse and the old library at Monterey Peninsula College.

The first race, held on November 9, 1957, was won by Pete Lovely driving a Ferrari. In the intervening years, the track has hosted USRRC, Can-Am, Trans-Am, Formula 5000, IMSA GT, CART, Indy Car, American Le Mans Series, Grand American, Monterey Historic Automobile Races, Speed World Challenge, AMA (American Motorcyclist Association), WSBK Superbike World Championship and MotoGP motorcycle races (but 125/Moto3 and 250/Moto2 are not admitted).

The day-to-day operations of the track, along with the management and promotion of major racing events, are now handled by A&D Narigi Consulting, LLC. John V. Narigi is the General Manager and President. Until January 1, 2020, it was managed by the Sports Car Racing Association of the Monterey Peninsula (SCRAMP), which is a non-profit organization. With oversight by a board of local residents, SCRAMP operates with a professional staff on-site with the goal of generating income through the operations of the racetrack which is then redistributed to local charities.

The track itself has undergone significant changes over the past two decades to meet evolving safety homologation requirements of the Fédération Internationale de Motocyclisme (FIM), Fédération Internationale de l'Automobile (FIA) and other sanctioning bodies. Changes include the addition of the entire infield area in 1988 (present-day turns 3, 4, and 5, eliminating the straight that started at present-day turn 2 and ended at present-day turn 5) extending the track from its original 1.9-mile (3.1 km) length to meet the minimum-track-length criteria of the FIM for MotoGP events, plus the more recent relocation of pedestrian bridges and embankments, and the expansion of gravel pits outside turns 1, 2, 5, 6, 8, 9, 10 for additional runoff. The original media center was demolished in 2006 to make way for additional run-off room in Turn 1. Also in 2006, the 'hump' at the top of the Rahal Straight was flattened to accommodate the MotoGP riders, though some claim that this increases the wind effects that can perturb a race motorcycle. Remnants of the old configuration can still be seen from the parking lot between turns two and five. They are found underneath a road leading to the parking area for entrant trailers and RVs.

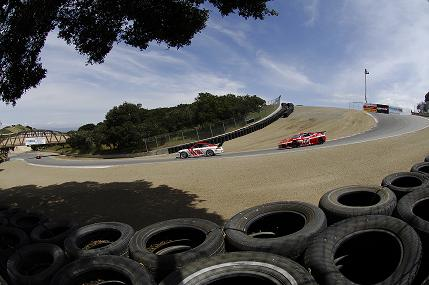
The Zanardi Corkscrew at Turn 8, with gradient up to 16%

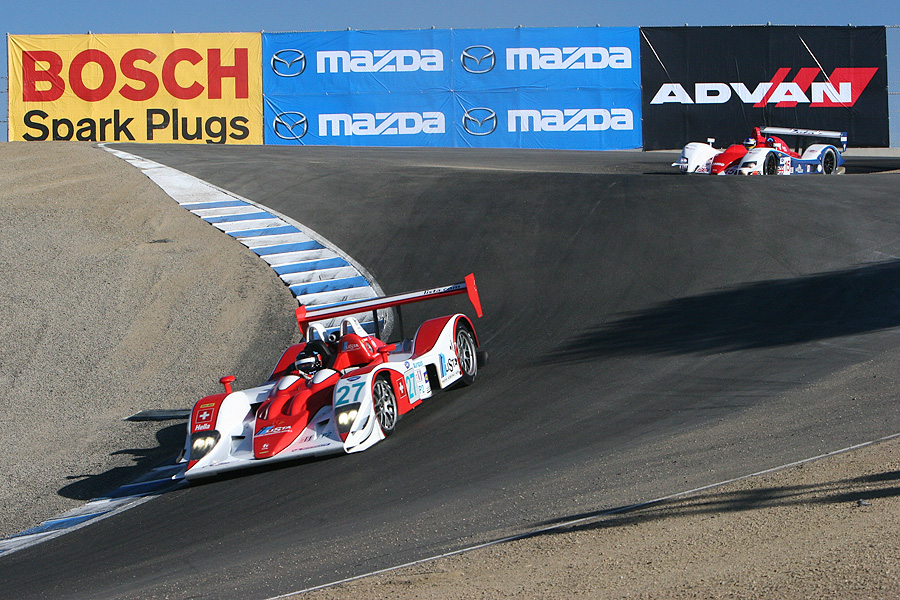
A view of the Corkscrew from the bottom

The famous Turn 8 and 8A combination, now called the Zanardi Corkscrew, is considered one of the motorsport world's most challenging turns, due to the 59 ft (18 m) drop in elevation as well as its blind crest and apex on the uphill approach.

Turn 2, with its difficult and technical double-apex, has been renamed the 'Andretti Hairpin', in honor racing ledged Mario Andretti, while Turn 9 has been renamed 'Rainey Curve' in honor of 500cc Grand Prix motorcycle racing World Champion Wayne Rainey, a resident of nearby Salinas, California. Also, the straight that runs between Turn 6 and Turn 7 has been renamed the 'Rahal Straight' as a tribute to Bobby Rahal, who won four straight CART races at the circuit between 1984 and 1987. Turns 8 and 8A are scheduled to be renamed Zanardi Corkscrew for Alessandro Zanardi as part of the 2026 IndyCar weekend as a tribute following his death; his final-lap pass of Bryan Herta at that corner for the lead of the 1996 CART race is regarded as one of the track's most famous moments.

A CART/Champ Car weekend had been a prominent event from 1983 through 2004, when its spot on the calendar was shifted to the San Jose Grand Prix. Uruguayan driver Gonzalo Rodríguez died during the practice session of the 1999 CART race after crashing at the Corkscrew. Because of the incident, runoff was installed at the end of the Rahal Straight.

Champ Car announced on September 11, 2007, that they would be returning the Northern California race to Laguna Seca from San Jose over the May 16–18 weekend in 2008. But the subsequent merger of Champ Car and IndyCar resulted in the race being canceled; the IRL already had a race on the schedule at Sonoma Raceway and that track's promoters exercised a clause in their race contract which gave it exclusive rights to host the IndyCars within a 150-mile radius. The Sonoma races struggled for attendance over time, though, and on July 17, 2018, IndyCar announced their return to Laguna Seca, with the event to be held the weekend of September 20–22, 2019; the race has marked the end of the IndyCar season in most years since it rejoined the schedule.

The track is also the site of the annual Rolex Monterey Motorsports Reunion, formerly known as the Monterey Historic Automobile Races. The event features an eclectic mixture of race cars on the course. Each year features a different marque. Considered one of the two greatest historic racing events (along with the Goodwood Festival in England), attendance often rivals, or surpasses the professional racing events listed above.

There are many permanent dry and hook-up camping facilities located at the raceway, which are available year-round as part of the Laguna Seca Recreation Area, the county park in which the racetrack is set.

The track's primary corporate sponsor is WeatherTech which began in April 2018. As part of the sponsorship, the track is now officially referred to as WeatherTech Raceway Laguna Seca. Previously, the sponsorship belonged to Mazda for 17 years with the track being known as Mazda Raceway Laguna Seca.

A 2015 study by California State University, Monterey Bay, and commissioned by SCRAMP states that the raceway generated $62.1 million (2015 USD) to the Monterey County economy and $5.2 million in state and local taxes.

== Layout history ==
Laguna Seca Raceway Layout History
Original Grand Prix Circuit (1957–1987)

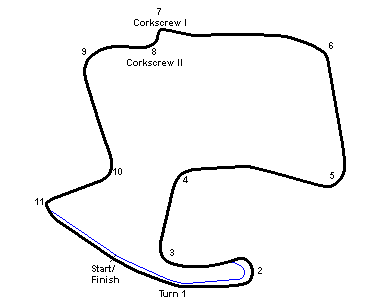
Grand Prix Circuit (1988–1995)

Grand Prix Circuit (1996–present)

== Lap records ==
On August 20, 2006, Toyota F1 test driver Ricardo Zonta set an unofficial lap record of 1:06.309. The previous record time was 1:07.722, set by Hélio Castroneves in a Penske Champ Car during qualifying for the 2000 CART Honda Grand Prix of Monterey. The unofficial record was re-taken by a Champ Car on March 10, 2007, by Sébastien Bourdais, who lapped in 1:05.880 during Champ Car Spring Training. The unofficial record was again re-taken by a Formula One car on May 19, 2012, by Marc Gené, who lapped in 1:05.786 in a Ferrari F2003-GA during the 2012 Ferrari Racing Days.

Christian Lundgaard is the unofficial qualifying record-holder with a lap time of 1:06.4610.

At the 2008 Monterey Sports Car Championships, David Brabham set a pole position time of 1:10.103 in a Le Mans Prototype.

At the 2012 United States motorcycle Grand Prix, Jorge Lorenzo set a pole time of 1:20.554 on the Yamaha YZR-M1. During the 2014 Superbike World Championship season, Tom Sykes set the superbike qualifying record time of 1:21.811 on the Kawasaki Ninja ZX-10R.

The 2019 McLaren Senna holds the current production car lap record. Driver Randy Pobst piloted the unmodified McLaren to a 1:27.62 lap time during MotorTrend's 2019 best driver car award testing.

The 2018 Porsche 911 GT2 RS previously held the current unofficial production car lap record with 1:28.30.

The Porsche 918 Spyder held the previous unofficial production car lap record with 1:29.89.

A Mission Motors Mission R, ridden by Steve Rapp, previously held the outright EV lap record with a time of 1:31.376. This was set during qualifying for the 2011 FIM e-Power International Championship/TTXGP World Series race.

In 2018, Earl Bamber clocked an unofficial best lap time of 1:07 around Laguna Seca in the Porsche 919 EVO, despite not intentionally trying to set a lap record.

A McLaren MP4/13, driven by Pato O'Ward set an unofficial lap time of 1:10.24 at the 2021 Velocity Invitational festival.

=== All-time unofficial lap records ===
Type	Event	Driver	Vehicle	Time	Date
Outright lap record	2012 Ferrari Racing Days	(Spain) Marc Gené	Ferrari F2003-GA	1:05.786	7 March 2012
All-time qualifying lap record	2023 Firestone Grand Prix of Monterey	(Denmark) Christian Lundgaard	Dallara IR-18	1:06.4610	9 September 2023
Electric car lap record	2024 Motorsports Reunion	(Hong Kong) Philip Kadoorie	McMurtry Spéirling PURE VP1	1:18.413	17 August 2024
Motorcycle qualifying lap record	2012 United States motorcycle Grand Prix	(Spain) Jorge Lorenzo	Yamaha YZR-M1	1:20.554	28 July 2012
Production car	Private event	(United States) Joel Miller	Czinger 21C	1:24.750	26 August 2024
Autonomous racing time trial lap record	2025 IAC @ Laguna Seca	(Italy) (United States) PoliMOVE	IAC AV-24	1:29.792	24 July 2025
Electric motorcycle qualifying lap record	2024 AHRMA Classic Motofest	(United States) Jayson Uribe	LightFighter v2.0	1:30.794	20 July 2024

=== Official race lap records ===
As of August 2026, the fastest official race lap records at Laguna Seca for different classes are listed as:

Category	Time	Driver	Vehicle	Event
Current Grand Prix Circuit (1996–present): 2.238 mi (3.602 km)
IndyCar	1:08.4168	Álex Palou	Dallara IR-18	2023 Firestone Grand Prix of Monterey
CART	1:10.148	Alex Zanardi	Reynard 96I	1996 Bank of America 300 Monterey Grand Prix
LMP2	1:11.156	Adrián Fernández	Acura ARX-01B	2008 Monterey Sports Car Championships
LMP1	1:12.126	Lucas Luhr	Audi R10 TDI	2008 Monterey Sports Car Championships
Indy NXT	1:12.7677	Christian Rasmussen	Dallara IL-15	2023 Laguna Seca Indy NXT round
LMDh	1:14.196	Sébastien Bourdais	Cadillac V-Series.R	2024 Motul Course de Monterey
DPi	1:15.546	Tom Blomqvist	Acura ARX-05	2022 Hyundai Monterey SportsCar Championship
LMH	1:15.716	Ross Gunn	Aston Martin Valkyrie AMR-LMH	2026 Monterey SportsCar Championship
LMP900	1:16.280	Allan McNish	Audi R8	2000 Monterey Sports Car Championships
Formula Atlantic	1:16.499	Jonathan Summerton	Swift 016.a	2009 Monterey Sports Car Championships
DP	1:16.914	Colin Braun	Oreca 07	2018 Hyundai Monterey Sports Car Championship
A1GP	1:17.951	Nicolas Lapierre	Lola A1GP	2006 Laguna Seca A1GP round
LMP	1:18.129	Eric Bernard	Panoz LMP-1 Roadster-S	1999 Monterey Sports Car Championships
LMP675	1:18.185	James Weaver	Lola EX257	2003 Monterey Sports Car Championships
WSC	1:19.060	Andrea Montermini	Ferrari 333 SP	1997 Visa Sports Car Championship
GT1 (Prototype)	1:19.094	Ricardo Zonta	Mercedes-Benz CLK LM	1998 FIA GT Laguna Seca 500km
LMPC	1:19.298	Bruno Junqueira	Oreca FLM09	2012 American Le Mans Monterey
GT1 (GTS)	1:19.604	Jan Magnussen	Chevrolet Corvette C6.R	2007 Monterey Sports Car Championships
GT3	1:20.942	Loris Spinelli	Lamborghini Huracán GT3 EVO2	2024 Motul Course de Monterey
Indy Pro 2000	1:21.1769	Sting Ray Robb	Tatuus PM-18	2019 Laguna Seca Indy Pro 2000 round
MotoGP	1:21.229	Dani Pedrosa	Honda RC213V	2012 United States motorcycle Grand Prix
LM GTE	1:21.827	Nick Tandy	Chevrolet Corvette C8.R	2021 Hyundai Monterey Sports Car Championship
Formula Regional	1:22.100	Ryan Shehan	Ligier JS F3	2024 FR Americas Invitational at WeatherTech Raceway Laguna Seca
World SBK	1:22.700	Jonathan Rea	Kawasaki Ninja ZX-10RR	2019 Laguna Seca World SBK round
Lamborghini Super Trofeo	1:22.772	Patrick Liddy	Lamborghini Huracán Super Trofeo EVO2	2024 Laguna Seca Lamborghini Super Trofeo North America round
Superbike	1:23.185	Cameron Beaubier	Yamaha YZF-R1	2020 Laguna Seca MotoAmerica round
Ferrari Challenge	1:23.520	Dylan Medler	Ferrari 296 Challenge	2024 Laguna Seca Ferrari Challenge North America round
GT2	1:23.793	Ron Fellows	Chevrolet Corvette C5-R	1999 Monterey Sports Car Championships
TA1	1:23.866	Chris Dyson	Ford Mustang Trans-Am	2022 Laguna Seca Trans-Am round
Superkart	1:23.875	Eddie Lawson	250cc Yamaha superkart	2003 World Superkart Challenge at Laguna Seca
Porsche Carrera Cup	1:23.879	Alex Sedgwick	Porsche 911 (992 I) GT3 Cup	2023 Laguna Seca Porsche Carrera Cup North America round
US F2000	1:25.4774	Christian Rasmussen	Tatuus USF-17	2019 Laguna Seca US F2000 round
GT	1:25.586	Timo Bernhard	Porsche 911 (996) GT3 RSR	2004 Monterey Sports Car Championships
Supersport	1:26.010	Garrett Gerloff	Yamaha YZF-R6	2017 Laguna Seca MotoAmerica round
Barber Pro	1:26.395	Nilton Rossoni	Reynard 98E	2000 Laguna Seca Barber Pro round
IMSA GTP	1:26.610	Bruce Canepa	Porsche 962C	2016 Rolex Monterey Motorsports Reunion
TA2	1:26.802	Mike Skeen	Chevrolet Camaro Trans-Am	2025 Laguna Seca Trans-Am round
F5000	1:27.352	Paul Zazryn	Lola T332	2015 Rolex Monterey Motorsports Reunion
Formula BMW	1:27.668	Alexander Rossi	Mygale FB02	2008 Laguna Seca Formula BMW Americas round
GT4	1:28.845	Daniel Morad	Mercedes-AMG GT4	2024 WeatherTech Raceway Laguna Seca 120
TCR Touring Car	1:30.486	Tim Lewis Jr.	Alfa Romeo Giulietta Veloce TCR	2024 WeatherTech Raceway Laguna Seca 120
IMSA GTO	1:30.662	Jeremy Barnes	Mazda RX-7	2016 Rolex Monterey Motorsports Reunion
World SSP	1:30.742	Pere Riba Cabana	Ducati 748	1998 Laguna Seca World SSP round
Group 5 sports car	1:31.301	Bob Earl	Ferrari 312 PB	2016 Rolex Monterey Motorsports Reunion
Mustang Challenge	1:31.359	Robert Noaker	Ford Mustang Dark Horse R	2025 Laguna Seca Mustang Challenge round
Super Touring	1:31.619	Neil Crompton	Honda Accord	1997 Laguna Seca NATCC round
eRoad Racing	1:32.581	Shane Turpin	Brammo Empulse RR	2013 Laguna Seca FIM eRoad Racing World Cup round
IROC	1:34.771	Kurt Busch	Pontiac Firebird	2026 Rolex Monterey Motorsports Reunion
Group 6 prototype	1:35.044	Nick Colyvas	Chevron B16	2016 Rolex Monterey Motorsports Reunion
Mazda MX-5 Cup	1:36.288	Jeremy Fletcher	Mazda MX-5 (ND)	2024 Laguna Seca Mazda MX-5 Cup round
Formula Junior	1:40.511	Jeremy Barnes	Lotus 22	2010 Rolex Monterey Motorsports Reunion
Group 3 GT (over 2500cc)	1:41.645	Chris MacAllister	Shelby Cobra 289 MkII	2016 Rolex Monterey Motorsports Reunion
Historic GT (under 2500cc)	1:43.077	Fred Della Noce	Ginetta G12	2016 Rolex Monterey Motorsports Reunion
Group 2 touring car	1:44.824	Mark Colbert	BMW 3.0 CSL	2015 Rolex Monterey Motorsports Reunion
Historic Group 4 sports car (under 2000cc)	1:45.737	Brian Orosco	Lola Mk1	2015 Rolex Monterey Motorsports Reunion
Historic sports car	1:51.374	Cameron Healy	Cooper Mk7-7/53-Porsche	2015 Rolex Monterey Motorsports Reunion
Historic GP	2:00.507	Paddins Dowling	Maserati 4CL	2015 Rolex Monterey Motorsports Reunion
Grand Prix Circuit (1988–1995): 2.214 mi (3.563 km)
CART	1:12.959	Paul Tracy	Penske PC-23	1994 Toyota Monterey Grand Prix
IMSA GTP	1:14.102	Juan Manuel Fangio II	Eagle MkIII	1992 Laguna Seca IMSA GT round
Indy Lights	1:18.130	Greg Moore	Lola T93/20	1995 Laguna Seca Indy Lights round
Formula Atlantic	1:18.356	Jamie Galles	Ralt RT40	1993 Laguna Seca Formula Atlantic round
IMSA GTP Lights	1:22.976	Ruggero Melgrati	Spice SE91P	1992 Laguna Seca IMSA GT round
WSC	1:23.017	Fermín Vélez	Ferrari 333 SP	1994 Laguna Seca IMSA GT round
IMSA GTS	1:24.274	Scott Pruett	Oldsmobile Cutlass	1993 Laguna Seca IMSA GT round
500cc	1:25.838	Kevin Schwantz	Suzuki RGV500	1990 United States motorcycle Grand Prix
250cc	1:27.959	Loris Capirossi	Honda NSR250	1993 United States motorcycle Grand Prix
IMSA GTO	1:30.892	Charles Morgan	Oldsmobile Cutlass	1993 Laguna Seca IMSA GT round
IMSA GTU	1:31.244	Jeremy Dale	Dodge Daytona	1989 Laguna Seca IMSA GT round
125cc	1:32.971	Kazuto Sakata	Honda RS125R	1993 United States motorcycle Grand Prix
IMSA Supercar	1:39.248	Martin Snow	Porsche 911 (993) Turbo	1995 Toyota Grand Prix of Monterey
Original Grand Prix Circuit (1957–1987): 1.900 mi (3.058 km)
Can-Am	0:56.810	Al Unser Jr.	Frissbee GR3	1982 Laguna Seca Can-Am round
F5000	0:58.230	Mario Andretti	Lola T332	1975 Monterey Grand Prix
IMSA GTP	0:58.874	Al Holbert	Porsche 962	1986 Monterey Triple Crown Camel Grand Prix
Group 7	0:59.710	Mark Donohue	Porsche 917/30 TC	1973 Monterey Castrol Grand Prix
Indy Lights	0:59.844	David Simpson	Wildcat-Buick	1987 Laguna Seca Indy Lights round
IMSA GTX	1:03.020	Brian Redman	Lola T600	1981 Datsun Monterey Triple Crown
IMSA GTO	1:04.693	Scott Pruett	Ford Mustang	1986 Monterey Triple Crown Camel Grand Prix
Trans-Am (TO)	1:04.990	Greg Pickett	Chevrolet Corvette 427	1978 Shasta Monterey Grand Prix Trans-Am
IMSA GTP Lights	1:05.061	Don Bell	Spice SE87L Pontiac Fiero GTP	1987 Nissan Monterey Triple Crown
Group 5	1:06.004	David Hobbs	BMW 320i	1977 Laguna Seca IMSA GT round
Group 4	1:07.400	Walt Hansgen	Lola T70	1965 Monterey Grand Prix Laguna Seca 200 miles
F750	1:08.250	Kenny Roberts	Yamaha TZ750	1979 Laguna Seca Formula 750 round
IMSA GTU	1:09.130	Roberto Moreno	Toyota Celica	1983 Monterey Triple Crown
Trans-Am (TU)	1:19.880	Bobby Allison	Datsun 510	1972 Monterey Castrol GTX Grand Prix

== Other use ==
=== Automotive ===
When not being used by the major events the track can be rented. Approximately twice a year the Sports Car Club of America holds regional club races for the San Francisco Region. Various clubs rent the track throughout the year for informal high-performance driving schools that allow the public to drive their own cars at speed. The raceway has also played host to prototype testing of the Nissan GT-R in 2007.

The track is featured in video games such as the Gran Turismo series (since the second installment, including the bike version Tourist Trophy), the Forza Motorsport series, the MotoGP series and track in the 1999 racing game Star Wars Episode I: Racer. In a bid to compare real life versus video games, Jeremy Clarkson of the British automotive show Top Gear attempted to beat his Gran Turismo 4 time of 1:41.148 in a Honda NSX by racing the real track in the same car in 2005. During the trials, Clarkson determined that the game omitted a few details of the track, and the game's physics allowed him to brake later when coming into turns than he could in real life. As a consequence, he managed a best time of only 1:57 on the real course. However, both he and the track instructor agreed that it is possible to complete the course in 1:41 in a Honda NSX if the driver were sufficiently experienced, talented, and most importantly fearless.

It was also used in 1976 for the film Herbie Goes to Monte Carlo as a qualifying track.

=== Other non-automotive events ===
Laguna Seca and the part of the old Fort Ord that is now Bureau of Land Management land annually host the Sea Otter Classic "Celebration of Cycling". The event has now become the largest cycling festival in the United States, bringing in over 10,000 racers and over 100,000 spectators – and is now the first major event of the year, typically held in April – for both the road bike and mountain bike professional seasons.

Several times each year, bicycles are permitted on the track for 2 hours. The admission fee is $10 per bicycle rider.

Laguna Seca served as the finish line for Stage 4 of the 2016 Amgen Tour of California and Stage 3 of the 2018 Amgen Tour of California bicycle races.

The raceway has occasionally been used as a venue for concerts and other non-sporting events. The Grateful Dead performed on the racetrack five times - twice in May 1987 (where, later that night, the band filmed their music video for "Touch of Grey") and three consecutive nights in July 1987.

On September 17, 1987, Pope John Paul II celebrated mass at Laguna Seca Raceway, where 72,000 people had gathered to see him.

In the 1990s, the raceway was the venue for the Laguna Seca Daze music festival, which featured performances from music acts in the folk, alternative rock and jam band genres. Artists who performed at the festival include Bob Dylan, Phish, Blues Traveler, 10,000 Maniacs, Big Head Todd and the Monsters, Meat Puppets, 4 Non Blondes, Jeff Healey, The Allman Brothers Band, Gin Blossoms and Shawn Colvin.

On June 24, 2011, John Mueller of Muellerized Suspension Systems married Sheila Stone on the top of the Corkscrew at Laguna Seca. This is the location where the ashes of Lee Mueller (4-time SCCA National Champion, IMSA GTU Champion, 3-time winner of the 24 Hours of Daytona, and 12 Hours of Sebring winner), John Mueller's father, were spread.

In spring 2020, due to the COVID-19 pandemic, graduation ceremonies took place at the raceway. Local schools participating included Carmel High School (June 3, 2020) and Pacific Grove High School (May 29, 2020). After collecting diplomas, graduates and their families were able to drive around the track in celebration.

== Events ==
Current

- May: IMSA SportsCar Championship Monterey SportsCar Championship, Michelin Pilot Challenge WeatherTech Raceway Laguna Seca 120, Lamborghini Super Trofeo North America, Mustang Challenge North America
- June: Ferrari Challenge North America, Formula Car Challenge, Sports Car Club of America
- July: MotoAmerica MotoAmerica Superbike Speedfest at Monterey
- August: Monterey Motorsports Reunion, International Race of Champions
- September: IndyCar Series IndyCar Grand Prix of Monterey, Indy NXT, Porsche Sprint Challenge USA West
- October: Trans-Am West Coast Championship, Sportscar Vintage Racing Association, Formula Car Challenge

Future

- Mazda MX-5 Cup (2004–2017, 2019, 2021, 2023–2024, 2027)
- Trans-Am Series (1969–1972, 1978–1982, 2000–2001, 2004, 2019, 2021–2022, 2025, 2027)
- USF Juniors (2027)
- USF2000 Championship (1991, 2004, 2013, 2015–2016, 2019, 2027)

Former

- A1 Grand Prix (2006)
- AMA Grand National Championship (1972–1976, 1980–1986)
- AMA Superbike Championship (1976–1988, 1992–2013)
- American Le Mans Series
  - American Le Mans Monterey (1999–2013)
- Atlantic Championship Series (1976, 1984–1988, 1990–2004, 2008–2009)
- Barber Pro Series (1991–1994, 1996–2003)
- Can-Am (1966–1973, 1978–1982)
- Championship Auto Racing Teams/Champ Car World Series
  - Marlboro Challenge (1989, 1991)
  - Monterey Grand Prix (1983–2004)
- FIA GT Championship (1997–1998)
- Formula 750 (1978–1979)
- Formula BMW Americas (2004–2005, 2008)
- Grand Prix motorcycle racing
  - United States motorcycle Grand Prix (1988–1991, 1993–1994, 2005–2013)
- GT World Challenge America (1990, 1999–2007, 2009, 2011–2012, 2015–2019)
- IMSA GT Championship
  - Monterey Grand Prix (1976–1977)
  - Monterey Sports Car Grand Prix (1974–1987, 1989, 1991–1994, 1997–1998)
- IMSA GT3 Cup Challenge (2005–2016, 2019)
- IMSA Prototype Challenge (2007–2008, 2010–2013, 2016)
- Intercontinental GT Challenge
  - California 8 Hours (2017–2019)
- NASCAR Winston West Series
  - West Series races at Laguna Seca (1973, 1975–1977, 1980–1981, 2000–2001)
- North American Touring Car Championship (1996–1997)
- Pacific Grand Prix (1960–1963)
- Porsche Carrera Cup North America (2022–2023)
- Porsche Rennsport Reunion (2011, 2015, 2018, 2023)
- Rolex Sports Car Series (2005–2009, 2011–2013)
- SCCA National Championship Runoffs (2014)
- SCCA National Sports Car Championship (1957)
- SCCA/USAC Formula 5000 Championship (1968–1975)
- Sidecar World Championship (1989–1991)
- Superbike World Championship (1995–2004, 2013–2019)
- Supersport World Championship (1998–1999)
- United States Road Racing Championship (1963–1968)
- USAC Road Racing Championship (1960–1962)

=== Formula One ===
In 1989, the year following the last Formula One race in Detroit, choices for a new location for the United States Grand Prix came down to Laguna Seca and Phoenix. The aforementioned 1988 improvements to the track were made in part to lure the F1 race. In the final decision, Laguna Seca was thought to be too remote and too small for an F1 crowd, and so Phoenix was granted the Grand Prix.

== Fatalities ==
- Gonzalo Rodríguez – 1999 Honda Grand Prix of Monterey
- Dani Rivas – 2015 MotoAmerica (SBK meet)
- Bernat Martínez – 2015 MotoAmerica (SBK meet)
