= 2012 United States motorcycle Grand Prix =

Motorcycle competition event

2012 United States Grand Prix
Race details
- Race 10 of 18 races in the 2012 Grand Prix motorcycle racing season
- Date: July 29, 2012
- Official name: Red Bull U.S. Grand Prix
- Location: Mazda Raceway Laguna Seca
- Course: Permanent racing facility; 3.610 km (2.243 mi)

MotoGP
Pole position
Rider	(Spain) Jorge Lorenzo	Yamaha
Time	1:20.554	
Fastest lap
Rider	(Spain) Dani Pedrosa	Honda
Time	1:21.229	
Podium
First	(Australia) Casey Stoner	Honda
Second	(Spain) Jorge Lorenzo	Yamaha
Third	(Spain) Dani Pedrosa	Honda

The 2012 United States motorcycle Grand Prix (formally known as the 2012 Red Bull U.S. Grand Prix) was the tenth round of the 2012 Grand Prix motorcycle racing season and the first of two races in the 2012 season to take place in the United States of America. It was held on July 29, 2012 at the Mazda Raceway Laguna Seca in Monterey, California.

Jorge Lorenzo qualified on pole position for the race, which was won by Casey Stoner.

== MotoGP classification ==
Pos.	No.	Rider	Team	Manufacturer	Laps	Time/Retired	Grid	Points
1	1	(Australia) Casey Stoner	Repsol Honda Team	Honda	32	43:45.961	2	25
2	99	(Spain) Jorge Lorenzo	Yamaha Factory Racing	Yamaha	32	+3.429	1	20
3	26	(Spain) Dani Pedrosa	Repsol Honda Team	Honda	32	+7.633	3	16
4	4	(Italy) Andrea Dovizioso	Monster Yamaha Tech 3	Yamaha	32	+18.602	6	13
5	35	(United Kingdom) Cal Crutchlow	Monster Yamaha Tech 3	Yamaha	32	+18.779	5	11
6	69	(United States) Nicky Hayden	Ducati Team	Ducati	32	+26.902	8	10
7	6	(Germany) Stefan Bradl	LCR Honda MotoGP	Honda	32	+28.393	9	9
8	19	(Spain) Álvaro Bautista	San Carlo Honda Gresini	Honda	32	+50.246	7	8
9	41	(Spain) Aleix Espargaró	Power Electronics Aspar	ART	32	+1:18.993	12	7
10	17	(Czech Republic) Karel Abraham	Cardion AB Motoracing	Ducati	32	+1:22.076	14	6
11	14	(France) Randy de Puniet	Power Electronics Aspar	ART	31	+1 Lap	11	5
12	68	(Colombia) Yonny Hernández	Avintia Blusens	BQR	31	+1 Lap	15	4
13	5	(United States) Colin Edwards	NGM Mobile Forward Racing	Suter	31	+1 Lap	13	3
14	22	(Spain) Iván Silva	Avintia Blusens	BQR	31	+1 Lap	20	2
Ret	46	(Italy) Valentino Rossi	Ducati Team	Ducati	29	Accident	10	
Ret	11	(United States) Ben Spies	Yamaha Factory Racing	Yamaha	21	Accident	4	
Ret	77	(United Kingdom) James Ellison	Paul Bird Motorsport	ART	19	Accident	21	
Ret	9	(Italy) Danilo Petrucci	Came IodaRacing Project	Ioda	18	Retirement	19	
Ret	54	(Italy) Mattia Pasini	Speed Master	ART	11	Retirement	18	
Ret	24	(Spain) Toni Elías	Pramac Racing Team	Ducati	1	Accident	17	
Ret	51	(Italy) Michele Pirro	San Carlo Honda Gresini	FTR	0	Accident	16	
DNQ	15	(United States) Steve Rapp	Attack Performance	APR		Did not qualify		

== Championship standings after the race (MotoGP) ==
Below are the standings for the top five riders and constructors after round ten has concluded.

Riders' Championship standings

Pos.	Rider	Points
1	(Spain) Jorge Lorenzo	205
2	(Spain) Dani Pedrosa	182
3	(Australia) Casey Stoner	173
4	(Italy) Andrea Dovizioso	121
5	(United Kingdom) Cal Crutchlow	106

Constructors' Championship standings

Pos.	Constructor	Points
1	(Japan) Honda	221
2	(Japan) Yamaha	221
3	(Italy) Ducati	106
4	(Italy) ART	48
5	(United Kingdom) FTR	16

- Note: Only the top five positions are included for both sets of standings.

Previous race: 2012 Italian Grand Prix	FIM Grand Prix World Championship; 2012 season	Next race: 2012 Indianapolis Grand Prix
Previous race: 2011 United States Grand Prix	United States motorcycle Grand Prix	Next race: 2013 United States Grand Prix
