= Karel Abraham =

Czech motorcycle racer

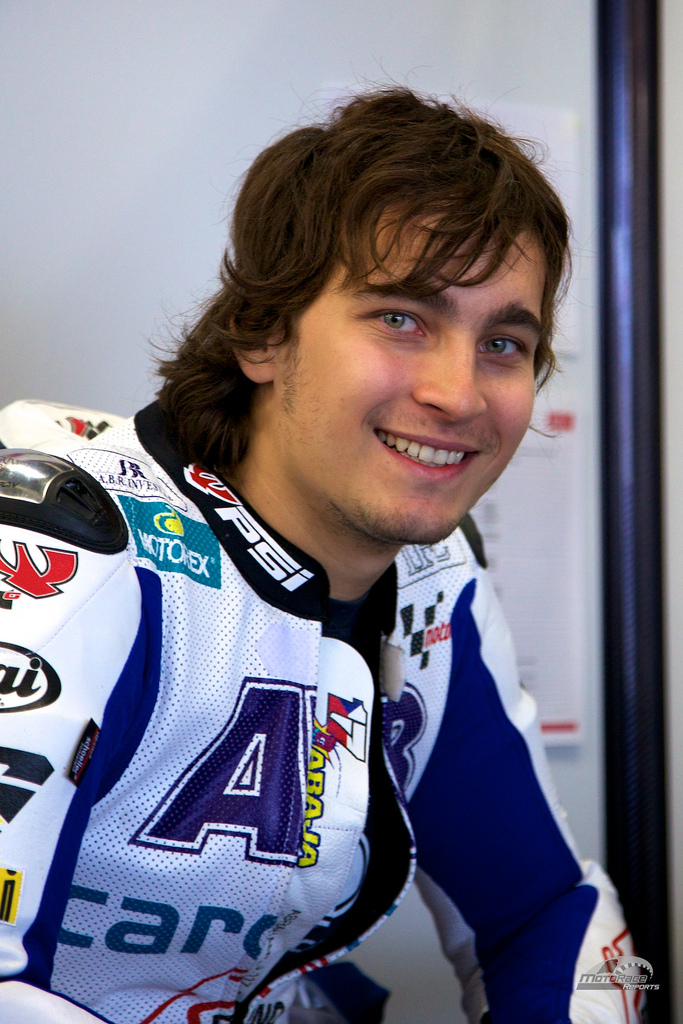
- Abraham at the 2011 British Grand Prix
- Nationality: Czech
- Born: 2 January 1990 (age 36); Brno, Czechoslovakia (Czech Republic)
- Website: karelabraham.com
Motorcycle racing career statistics
MotoGP World Championship
Active years	2011–2015, 2017–2019
Manufacturers	Ducati, ART, Honda
Championships	0
2019 championship position	24th (9 pts)
Starts / Wins / Podiums / Poles / F. laps / Points; 122 / 0 / 0 / 0 / 0 / 214
Moto2 World Championship
Active years	2010
Manufacturers	RSV, FTR
Championships	0
2010 championship position	10th (96 pts)
Starts / Wins / Podiums / Poles / F. laps / Points; 14 / 1 / 2 / 0 / 1 / 96
250cc World Championship
Active years	2007–2009
Manufacturers	Aprilia
Championships	0
2009 championship position	14th (74 pts)
Starts / Wins / Podiums / Poles / F. laps / Points; 47 / 0 / 0 / 0 / 0 / 145
125cc World Championship
Active years	2005–2006
Manufacturers	Aprilia
Championships	0
2006 championship position	24th (8 pts)
Starts / Wins / Podiums / Poles / F. laps / Points; 31 / 0 / 0 / 0 / 0 / 8
Superbike World Championship
Active years	2016
Manufacturers	BMW
Championships	0
2016 championship position	18th (33 pts)
Starts / Wins / Podiums / Poles / F. laps / Points; 24 / 0 / 0 / 0 / 0 / 33

Karel Abraham (born 2 January 1990) is a retired motorcycle racer from the Czech Republic. He competed in Grand Prix motorcycle racing from 2005 to 2019, riding in the 125cc, 250cc, Moto2 and MotoGP classes, with the exception of 2016, when he raced in the Superbike World Championship. In 2010 he won the Moto2 Valencian Grand Prix and finished third at Twin Ring Motegi in the same class.

His father, also called Karel Abraham, has owned Brno Circuit since December 2005. In 2012, Abraham optained a Bachelor of Laws degree at the Joštova Academy in Brno.

== Career ==
=== 125cc World Championship ===
Abraham started racing in the 125cc class of the world championship in 2005, riding for Semprucci Cardion Blauer on an Aprilia motorcycle. In 2006 he rode for his father's AB Motoracing team.

=== 250cc World Championship ===
From 2007 to 2009, Abraham rode in 250cc for AB Motoracing using Aprilia motorcycles.

=== Moto2 World Championship ===
In 2010, Abraham and AB Motoracing competed in the new Moto2 class, using RSV and FTR chassis. Abraham took his and his team's first victory in Valencia.

=== MotoGP World Championship ===
Abraham and the team stepped up to MotoGP in 2011, having signed a contract with Ducati, he finished the season in fourteenth place in the championship; his best results were a pair of seventh-place finishes at Jerez and Silverstone. The team remained with Ducati for 2012 and Abraham finished the season with a best result of seventh at Valencia.

For 2013 Abraham switched to an ART-Aprilia running under CRT regulations, He finished the season in 24th place overall with just five points. CRT was restructured as the "Open" class for 2014 and Abraham took part with the new Honda RCV1000R. He obtained the 17th position in the riders' championship. In 2015, Abraham struggled with the Honda RC213V-RS and did not score any points.

=== Superbike World Championship ===
On 21 November 2015, Milwaukee BMW announced that Abraham would race for the team for the 2016 season of the Superbike World Championship, partnering 2015 British Superbike Championship winner Josh Brookes.

=== Return to MotoGP ===
Abraham returned to MotoGP in 2017 riding a Ducati for the Pull&Bear Aspar Team. He remained with the team, now called Ángel Nieto Team, for 2018. He raced for Avintia Racing on a Ducati in 2019. His contract was terminated at the end of the season.

== Career statistics ==
=== Grand Prix motorcycle racing ===
==== By season ====
Season	Class	Motorcycle	Team	Number	Race	Win	Podium	Pole	FLap	Pts	Plcd
2005	125cc	Aprilia	Semprucci Cardion Blauer	44	15	0	0	0	0	0	NC
2006	125cc	Aprilia	Cardion AB Motoracing	44	16	0	0	0	0	8	24th
2007	250cc	Aprilia	Cardion AB Motoracing	17	17	0	0	0	0	31	16th
2008	250cc	Aprilia	Cardion AB Motoracing	17	14	0	0	0	0	40	16th
2009	250cc	Aprilia	Cardion AB Motoracing	17	16	0	0	0	0	74	14th
2010	Moto2	RSV	Cardion AB Motoracing	17	14	1	2	0	1	96	10th
2010	Moto2	FTR	Cardion AB Motoracing	17	14	1	2	0	1	96	10th
2011	MotoGP	Ducati	Cardion AB Motoracing	17	16	0	0	0	0	64	14th
2012	MotoGP	Ducati	Cardion AB Motoracing	17	14	0	0	0	0	59	14th
2013	MotoGP	ART	Cardion AB Motoracing	17	9	0	0	0	0	5	24th
2014	MotoGP	Honda	Cardion AB Motoracing	17	18	0	0	0	0	33	17th
2015	MotoGP	Honda	AB Motoracing	17	10	0	0	0	0	0	NC
2017	MotoGP	Ducati	Pull&Bear Aspar Team	17	18	0	0	0	0	32	20th
2018	MotoGP	Ducati	Ángel Nieto Team	17	18	0	0	0	0	12	23rd
2019	MotoGP	Ducati	Reale Avintia Racing	17	19	0	0	0	0	9	24th
Total					**214**	**1**	**2**	**0**	**1**	**463**	

==== By class ====
Class	Seasons	1st GP	1st Pod	1st Win	Race	Win	Podiums	Pole	FLap	Pts	WChmp
125cc	2005–2006	2005 Spain			31	0	0	0	0	8	0
250cc	2007–2009	2007 Qatar			47	0	0	0	0	145	0
Moto2	2010	2010 Qatar	2010 Japan	2010 Valencia	14	1	2	0	1	96	0
MotoGP	2011–2015, 2017–2019	2011 Qatar			122	0	0	0	0	214	0
Total	2005–2015, 2017–2019				**214**	**1**	**2**	**0**	**1**	**463**	**0**

==== Races by year ====
(key) (Races in bold indicate pole position; races in italics indicate fastest lap)

Year	Class	Bike	1	2	3	4	5	6	7	8	9	10	11	12	13	14	15	16	17	18	19	Pos	Pts
2005	125cc	Aprilia	SPA; 22	POR; Ret	CHN; 27	FRA; 21	ITA; 27	CAT; Ret	NED; Ret	GBR; 17	GER; 17	CZE; Ret	JPN; 28	MAL; Ret	QAT; 28	AUS	TUR; 18	VAL; Ret				NC	0
2006	125cc	Aprilia	SPA; 23	QAT; 24	TUR; 22	CHN; 26	FRA; 25	ITA; Ret	CAT; 21	NED; Ret	GBR; 28	GER; Ret	CZE; Ret	MAL; 18	AUS; 17	JPN; 13	POR; 11	VAL; Ret				24th	8
2007	250cc	Aprilia	QAT; Ret	SPA; 15	TUR; 12	CHN; Ret	FRA; Ret	ITA; 16	CAT; 14	GBR; 10	NED; 15	GER; Ret	CZE; 14	RSM; 14	POR; 10	JPN; Ret	AUS; 13	MAL; 12	VAL; Ret			16th	31
2008	250cc	Aprilia	QAT; 7	SPA; 13	POR; 16	CHN; Ret	FRA; Ret	ITA; 7	CAT; Ret	GBR; 12	NED; DNS	GER; Ret	CZE; Ret	RSM; 10	INP	JPN	AUS; 11	MAL; 12	VAL; 17			16th	40
2009	250cc	Aprilia	QAT; Ret	JPN; 9	SPA; Ret	FRA; 12	ITA; 13	CAT; 8	NED; 7	GER; Ret	GBR; 14	CZE; Ret	INP; 10	RSM; 11	POR; 10	AUS; 6	MAL; 12	VAL; 6				14th	74
2010	Moto2	RSV	QAT; 14	SPA; 28																		10th	96
2010	Moto2	FTR			FRA; Ret	ITA; 17	GBR; Ret	NED; 9	CAT; 4	GER; 5	CZE; DNS	INP; DNS	RSM; DNS	ARA; 18	JPN; 3	MAL; 6	AUS; 10	POR; 10	VAL; 1			10th	96
2011	MotoGP	Ducati	QAT; 13	SPA; 7	POR; Ret	FRA; 10	CAT; 10	GBR; 7	NED; Ret	ITA; 12	GER; 12	USA; 11	CZE; Ret	INP; Ret	RSM; 12	ARA; Ret	JPN; DNS	AUS; 10	MAL; C	VAL; 8		14th	64
2012	MotoGP	Ducati	QAT; Ret	SPA; 17	POR; Ret	FRA; Ret	CAT; 12	GBR; WD	NED; DNS	GER	ITA	USA; 10	INP; 8	CZE; 9	RSM; Ret	ARA; 9	JPN; 11	MAL; 10	AUS; 9	VAL; 7		14th	59
2013	MotoGP	ART	QAT; Ret	AME; DNS	SPA; DNS	FRA; 15	ITA; 15	CAT; Ret	NED; 15	GER; 18	USA; 14	INP; DNS	CZE; 19	GBR	RSM; Ret	ARA	MAL	AUS	JPN	VAL		24th	5
2014	MotoGP	Honda	QAT; 13	AME; 14	ARG; 13	SPA; Ret	FRA; 15	ITA; 12	CAT; Ret	NED; 14	GER; 13	INP; 11	CZE; 14	GBR; 13	RSM; 11	ARA; Ret	JPN; Ret	AUS; Ret	MAL; Ret	VAL; 17		17th	33
2015	MotoGP	Honda	QAT; Ret	AME; Ret	ARG; 21	SPA; Ret	FRA; Ret	ITA; 17	CAT; DNS	NED	GER	INP	CZE; 21	GBR; 19	RSM; 21	ARA; Ret	JPN	AUS	MAL	VAL		NC	0
2017	MotoGP	Ducati	QAT; 14	ARG; 10	AME; Ret	SPA; 15	FRA; Ret	ITA; 16	CAT; 14	NED; 7	GER; 17	CZE; 13	AUT; 14	GBR; 13	RSM; 17	ARA; Ret	JPN; Ret	AUS; 14	MAL; Ret	VAL; 14		20th	32
2018	MotoGP	Ducati	QAT; 15	ARG; 20	AME; Ret	SPA; 18	FRA; 17	ITA; Ret	CAT; 13	NED; Ret	GER; 18	CZE; 18	AUT; 21	GBR; C	RSM; 20	ARA; 15	THA; 17	JPN; Ret	AUS; 11	MAL; Ret	VAL; 14	23rd	12
2019	MotoGP	Ducati	QAT; 18	ARG; Ret	AME; 16	SPA; 16	FRA; DSQ	ITA; 14	CAT; Ret	NED; 17	GER; 15	CZE; 19	AUT; 15	GBR; 15	RSM; 17	ARA; 18	THA; 19	JPN; 18	AUS; 14	MAL; 17	VAL; 14	24th	9

=== Superbike World Championship ===
==== Races by year ====
(key) (Races in bold indicate pole position; races in italics indicate fastest lap)

Year	Bike	1		2		3		4		5		6		7		8		9		10		11		12		13		Pos	Pts
Year	Bike	R1	R2	R1	R2	R1	R2	R1	R2	R1	R2	R1	R2	R1	R2	R1	R2	R1	R2	R1	R2	R1	R2	R1	R2	R1	R2	Pos	Pts
2016	BMW	AUS; 13	AUS; 11	THA; Ret	THA; 15	SPA; 15	SPA; 14	NED; Ret	NED; 14	ITA; 16	ITA; Ret	MAL; 12	MAL; Ret	GBR; 9	GBR; Ret	ITA; Ret	ITA; 15	USA; 14	USA; 12	GER; Ret	GER; 15	FRA; 16	FRA; 16	SPA	SPA	QAT; Ret	QAT; Ret	18th	33
