= FIM eRoad Racing World Cup =

Electric motorcycle road racing series

FIM eRoadRacing World Cup
- Category: electric motorcycle
- Country: International
- Inaugural season: 2013
- Folded: 2013
- Last Riders' champion: Ho Chi Fung (Europe); Eric Bostrom (N. America)
- Official website: eRoadRacing.com

The FIM eRoad Racing World Cup was a championship of electric motorcycle road racing, organised by the Fédération Internationale de Motocyclisme (FIM) and was only held in this form in 2013. It followed the unification of the former TTXGP series with the FIM "e-Power" electric motorcycle racing series.

== History ==
=== 2013 World Cup season ===
The 2013 eRoadRacing World Cup was planned to consist of 4 races in Europe and 4 in North America, with a world final in Asia. The FIM races at Laguna Seca, Indianapolis Motor Speedway, Circuit de Valencia, Le Mans, Oschersleben and Miller Motorsports Park were on the announced 2013 calendar. However, only 6 events (4 in Europe and 2 in North America) did actually take place, with a double header event at Valencia and the cancellation of the event in Utah. The remaining races had to be cancelled because time constraints didn't allow the organizers to find suitable venues. Since there was no World Final after the proposed destination as a support event of the Superbike World Championship round at the Buddh International Circuit in India was cancelled, two separate winners were announced for the two series: Ho Chi Fung (Zongshen, China) for the European series and Eric Bostrom (Icon Brammo, USA) for the North American series.

=== Cancellation ===
There was a road map for the following two years, that would eventually have led to a full World Championship. However, the series was not continued in 2014.

Eventually, in 2018, the FIM announced a European championship, promoted by Dorna, the FIM Enel MotoE World Cup, to begin in 2019. The events will be short races on five different European stops on the MotoGP season.

== See also ==
- TTXGP
- FIA Formula E Championship
