= 2006 Chinese motorcycle Grand Prix =

Motorsport event

(China) 2006 Chinese Grand Prix
Race details
- Race 4 of 17 races in the 2006 Grand Prix motorcycle racing season
- Date: 14 May 2006
- Official name: Polini Grand Prix of China
- Location: Shanghai International Circuit
- Course: Permanent racing facility; 5.281 km (3.281 mi)

MotoGP
Pole position
- Rider: (Spain) Dani Pedrosa
- Time: 1:59.009
Fastest lap
- Rider: (Spain) Dani Pedrosa
- Time: 1:59.318
Podium
- First: (Spain) Dani Pedrosa
- Second: (United States) Nicky Hayden
- Third: (United States) Colin Edwards

250cc
Pole position
- Rider: (Spain) Héctor Barberá
- Time: 2:05.781
Fastest lap
- Rider: (Italy) Andrea Dovizioso
- Time: 2:06.865
Podium
- First: (Spain) Héctor Barberá
- Second: (Italy) Andrea Dovizioso
- Third: (Japan) Hiroshi Aoyama

125cc
Pole position
- Rider: (Finland) Mika Kallio
- Time: 2:11.572
Fastest lap
- Rider: (Spain) Álvaro Bautista
- Time: 2:12.131
Podium
- First: (Finland) Mika Kallio
- Second: (Italy) Mattia Pasini
- Third: (Spain) Álvaro Bautista

The 2006 Chinese motorcycle Grand Prix was the fourth race of the 2006 Motorcycle Grand Prix season. It took place on the weekend of 12–14 May 2006 at the Shanghai International Circuit.

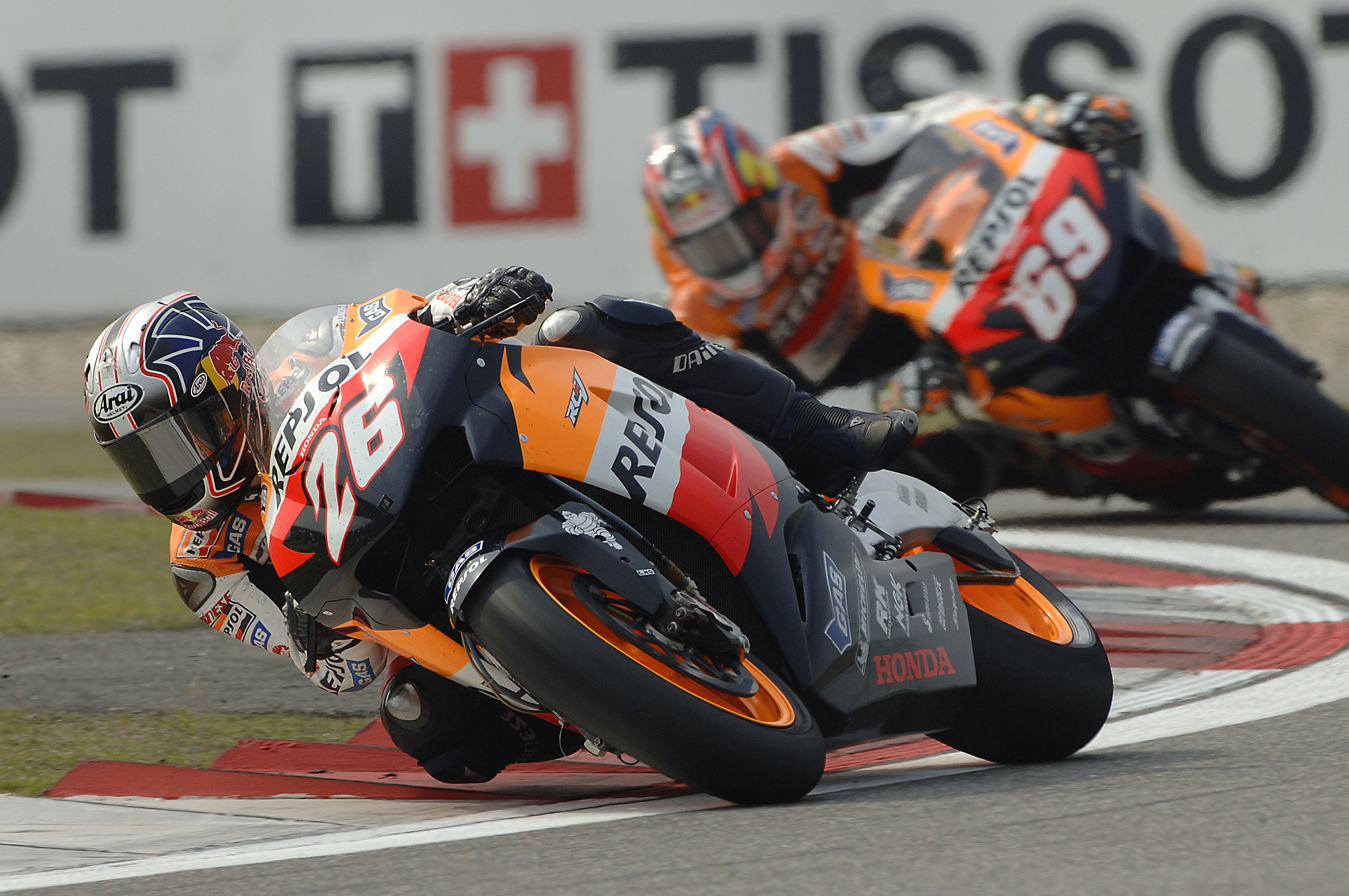
Dani Pedrosa and Nicky Hayden, riding their Hondas in the MotoGP race. They went on to finish first and second, which was Pedrosa's first victory in the MotoGP class.

== MotoGP classification ==
Pos.	No.	Rider	Team	Manufacturer	Laps	Time/Retired	Grid	Points
1	26	(Spain) Dani Pedrosa	Repsol Honda Team	Honda	22	44:07.734	1	25
2	69	(United States) Nicky Hayden	Repsol Honda Team	Honda	22	+1.505	5	20
3	5	(United States) Colin Edwards	Camel Yamaha Team	Yamaha	22	+14.634	3	16
4	21	(United States) John Hopkins	Rizla Suzuki MotoGP	Suzuki	22	+19.265	2	13
5	27	(Australia) Casey Stoner	Honda LCR	Honda	22	+23.061	7	11
6	6	(Japan) Makoto Tamada	Konica Minolta Honda	Honda	22	+23.879	11	10
7	33	(Italy) Marco Melandri	Fortuna Honda	Honda	22	+24.101	8	9
8	65	(Italy) Loris Capirossi	Ducati Marlboro Team	Ducati	22	+24.467	10	8
9	15	(Spain) Sete Gibernau	Ducati Marlboro Team	Ducati	22	+28.358	6	7
10	56	(Japan) Shinya Nakano	Kawasaki Racing Team	Kawasaki	22	+33.815	4	6
11	24	(Spain) Toni Elías	Fortuna Honda	Honda	22	+35.316	15	5
12	17	(France) Randy de Puniet	Kawasaki Racing Team	Kawasaki	22	+52.004	9	4
13	10	(United States) Kenny Roberts Jr.	Team Roberts	KR211V	22	+56.293	18	3
14	7	(Spain) Carlos Checa	Tech 3 Yamaha	Yamaha	22	+1:03.575	14	2
15	66	(Germany) Alex Hofmann	Pramac d'Antin MotoGP	Ducati	22	+1:11.172	16	1
16	77	(United Kingdom) James Ellison	Tech 3 Yamaha	Yamaha	22	+1:23.075	17	
17	30	(Spain) José Luis Cardoso	Pramac d'Antin MotoGP	Ducati	22	+1:35.150	19	
Ret	46	(Italy) Valentino Rossi	Camel Yamaha Team	Yamaha	17	Tyre wear	13	
Ret	71	(Australia) Chris Vermeulen	Rizla Suzuki MotoGP	Suzuki	3	Accident	12	

== 250 cc classification ==
Pos.	No.	Rider	Manufacturer	Laps	Time/Retired	Grid	Points
1	80	(Spain) Héctor Barberá	Aprilia	21	44:49.445	1	25
2	34	(Italy) Andrea Dovizioso	Honda	21	+0.266	4	20
3	4	(Japan) Hiroshi Aoyama	KTM	21	+3.320	7	16
4	48	(Spain) Jorge Lorenzo	Aprilia	21	+3.602	2	13
5	55	(Japan) Yuki Takahashi	Honda	21	+3.618	6	11
6	58	(Italy) Marco Simoncelli	Gilera	21	+15.850	17	10
7	15	(Italy) Roberto Locatelli	Aprilia	21	+16.003	11	9
8	73	(Japan) Shuhei Aoyama	Honda	21	+16.555	3	8
9	14	(Australia) Anthony West	Aprilia	21	+21.860	8	7
10	96	(Czech Republic) Jakub Smrž	Aprilia	21	+27.041	9	6
11	54	(San Marino) Manuel Poggiali	KTM	21	+34.289	10	5
12	50	(France) Sylvain Guintoli	Aprilia	21	+34.563	12	4
13	36	(Colombia) Martín Cárdenas	Honda	21	+39.232	16	3
14	25	(Italy) Alex Baldolini	Aprilia	21	+41.696	20	2
15	28	(Germany) Dirk Heidolf	Aprilia	21	+42.693	13	1
16	8	(Italy) Andrea Ballerini	Aprilia	21	+43.148	15	
17	57	(United Kingdom) Chaz Davies	Aprilia	21	+56.667	18	
18	16	(France) Jules Cluzel	Aprilia	21	+1:00.754	23	
19	23	(Spain) Arturo Tizón	Honda	21	+1:08.145	19	
20	62	(China) Shi Zhao Huang	Yamaha	21	+1:45.025	22	
21	63	(China) Jin Xiao	Yamaha	20	+1 lap	25	
Ret	85	(Italy) Alessio Palumbo	Aprilia	15	Retirement	27	
Ret	19	(Argentina) Sebastián Porto	Honda	12	Retirement	21	
Ret	22	(Italy) Luca Morelli	Aprilia	7	Retirement	26	
Ret	59	(China) Chin Feng Ho	Aprilia	3	Accident	28	
Ret	60	(China) Zhu Wang	Aprilia	3	Retirement	24	
Ret	7	(San Marino) Alex de Angelis	Aprilia	2	Accident	5	
Ret	21	(France) Arnaud Vincent	Honda	0	Retirement	14	
DNQ	61	(China) Zheng Peng Li	Aprilia		Did not qualify		

== 125 cc classification ==
Pos.	No.	Rider	Manufacturer	Laps	Time/Retired	Grid	Points
1	36	(Finland) Mika Kallio	KTM	19	42:06.223	1	25
2	75	(Italy) Mattia Pasini	Aprilia	19	+0.097	6	20
3	19	(Spain) Álvaro Bautista	Aprilia	19	+0.357	4	16
4	14	(Hungary) Gábor Talmácsi	Honda	19	+0.899	5	13
5	60	(Spain) Julián Simón	KTM	19	+1.106	3	11
6	52	(Czech Republic) Lukáš Pešek	Derbi	19	+1.886	2	10
7	55	(Spain) Héctor Faubel	Aprilia	19	+20.727	20	9
8	32	(Italy) Fabrizio Lai	Honda	19	+21.478	11	8
9	71	(Japan) Tomoyoshi Koyama	Malaguti	19	+21.558	10	7
10	24	(Italy) Simone Corsi	Gilera	19	+21.640	19	6
11	33	(Spain) Sergio Gadea	Aprilia	19	+21.722	13	5
12	35	(Italy) Raffaele De Rosa	Aprilia	19	+22.017	8	4
13	29	(Italy) Andrea Iannone	Aprilia	19	+23.734	17	3
14	6	(Spain) Joan Olivé	Aprilia	19	+27.491	21	2
15	63	(France) Mike Di Meglio	Honda	19	+39.818	16	1
16	41	(Spain) Aleix Espargaró	Honda	19	+49.284	15	
17	11	(Germany) Sandro Cortese	Honda	19	+49.332	18	
18	16	(Italy) Michele Conti	Honda	19	+49.500	23	
19	18	(Spain) Nicolás Terol	Derbi	19	+49.744	24	
20	17	(Germany) Stefan Bradl	KTM	19	+49.793	22	
21	43	(Spain) Manuel Hernández	Aprilia	19	+50.009	25	
22	38	(United Kingdom) Bradley Smith	Honda	19	+50.162	30	
23	12	(Italy) Federico Sandi	Aprilia	19	+54.547	32	
24	53	(Italy) Simone Grotzkyj	Aprilia	19	+55.055	39	
25	15	(Italy) Michele Pirro	Aprilia	19	+59.726	31	
26	44	(Czech Republic) Karel Abraham	Aprilia	19	+1:04.809	33	
27	37	(Netherlands) Joey Litjens	Honda	19	+1:04.818	34	
28	21	(Spain) Mateo Túnez	Aprilia	19	+1:21.244	35	
29	20	(Italy) Roberto Tamburini	Aprilia	19	+1:22.707	38	
30	26	(Switzerland) Vincent Braillard	Aprilia	19	+1:22.994	37	
31	13	(Italy) Dino Lombardi	Aprilia	19	+1:23.596	36	
32	45	(Hungary) Imre Tóth	Aprilia	19	+1:43.819	27	
33	9	(Austria) Michael Ranseder	KTM	19	+1:50.719	29	
Ret	23	(Italy) Lorenzo Baroni	Honda	16	Accident	27	
Ret	22	(Spain) Pablo Nieto	Aprilia	15	Retirement	8	
Ret	7	(France) Alexis Masbou	Malaguti	10	Retirement	26	
Ret	1	(Switzerland) Thomas Lüthi	Honda	4	Retirement	7	
Ret	10	(Spain) Ángel Rodríguez	Aprilia	2	Accident	9	
Ret	8	(Italy) Lorenzo Zanetti	Aprilia	0	Accident	14	
DSQ	86	(China) Ho Wan Chow	Honda	11	Black flag	40	

== Championship standings after the race (MotoGP) ==
Below are the standings for the top five riders and constructors after round four has concluded.

Riders' Championship standings

Pos.	Rider	Points
1	(United States) Nicky Hayden	72
2	(Italy) Loris Capirossi	59
3	(Spain) Dani Pedrosa	57
4	(Italy) Marco Melandri	54
5	(Australia) Casey Stoner	52

Constructors' Championship standings

Pos.	Constructor	Points
1	(Japan) Honda	90
2	(Japan) Yamaha	59
3	(Italy) Ducati	59
4	(Japan) Suzuki	29
5	(Japan) Kawasaki	28

- Note: Only the top five positions are included for both sets of standings.

Previous race: 2006 Turkish Grand Prix	FIM Grand Prix World Championship; 2006 season	Next race: 2006 French Grand Prix
Previous race: 2005 Chinese Grand Prix	Chinese motorcycle Grand Prix	Next race: 2007 Chinese Grand Prix
