= Ducati Corse =

Italian motorcycle racing team

- Type: Division
- Founded: 1999; 27 years ago
- Headquarters: Bologna, Italy
- Key people: General Manager: Luigi Dall'Igna; Sporting Director: Mauro Grassilli; General Manager Off-Road: Paolo Ciabatti; MotoGP Race Team Manager: Davide Tardozzi; Technical Director; Davide Barana
- Parent: Ducati
- Website: www.ducati.com/ww/en/home

Ducati Corse (Italian pronunciation: [duˈkaːti]) is the racing division of Ducati.

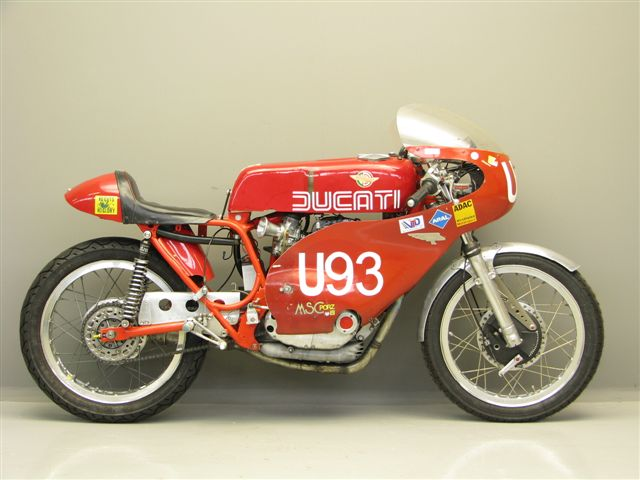
A Ducati racing motorcycle from 1968

== Organization ==
The company is split into four departments with 100+ employees working for the Ducati Corse, almost 10% of the Ducati Motor Holding S.p.A. workforce.

=== Ownership ===
Between 1998 and 2004 the racing division existed as a subsidiary company named Ducati Corse S.r.l., fully owned by Ducati Motor Holding.

=== Technical research and development ===
Technical research and development is composed of two teams responsible for the design and development of the motorcycles that compete in the MotoGP and Superbike championships.

=== Sporting activities ===
The sporting activities department is responsible for the factory teams that take part in the MotoGP class of Grand Prix motorcycle racing, the Superbike and Supersport, together with national championships.

=== Commercial activities ===
The commercial activities department is responsible for providing private teams with motorcycles and spare parts.

It also provides consultancy services and technical assistance to Ducati privateers take part in the Superbike World Championship and in national Superbike championships.

=== Marketing and communication ===
The marketing and communication department's goal is to increase and manage the Ducati brand image in racing.

It is also responsible for Ducati Corse official merchandising line.

== History ==
Ducati's history with motorsport began with speed records on Cucciolo motorized bicycle factory racers in 1951, followed in 1954 with bringing in Fabio Taglioni to found a road-racing program with the 100 Gran Sport.

== MotoGP ==
Ducati MotoGP
- 2026 name: Ducati Lenovo Team
- Base: Borgo Panigale, Bologna, Italy
- Principal: General Manager: Luigi Dall'Igna; Project Director: Mauro Grassilli; MotoGP Race Team Manager: Davide Tardozzi
- Rider(s): MotoGP: 63. Francesco Bagnaia; 93. Marc Márquez
- Motorcycle: Ducati Desmosedici GP26
- Tyres: Michelin
- Constructors' Championships: MotoGP: 7; 2007, 2020, 2021, 2022, 2023, 2024, 2025
- Riders' Championships: MotoGP: 4; 2007: Casey Stoner; 2022, 2023: Francesco Bagnaia; 2025: Marc Márquez
- Teams' Championships: MotoGP: 5; 2007, 2021, 2022, 2024, 2025

When the MotoGP technical rules changed in the 2002 season, Ducati decided to return to MotoGP in 2003.

=== Capirossi era ===
==== 2003 ====
Troy Bayliss and Loris Capirossi were signed to the then-named "Ducati Marlboro Team" for the 2003 season. Capirossi got a podium in the opening round of the championship in Japan, and won in Catalonia. Capirossi finished fourth in the final championship standings and Bayliss sixth. Ducati finished an impressive second in the Constructors' standings, behind Honda and ahead of Yamaha.

==== 2004 ====
A large part of 2004 was already over before Ducati's bike became competitive. Bayliss scored his only podium position of the season at the penultimate round in Phillip Island, and Capirossi at the final round in Valencia.

==== 2005 ====
In 2005 Bayliss was replaced by Spain's Carlos Checa, and Ducati switched tyre suppliers to Bridgestone. Capirossi took two wins at Motegi and Sepang, while Checa scored two podium positions. They finished sixth and ninth in the riders' standings.

==== 2006 ====
The 2006 season proved turbulent for Ducati. Checa was replaced by fellow Spaniard Sete Gibernau.

The team took its first win of 2006 in the opening round at Jerez, followed by a podium in Qatar. Capirossi led the championship for a short time, but at the start of the Catalan Grand Prix, Capirossi and Gibernau collided. Both riders ended up injured and in hospital, with Gibernau sustaining a broken collar bone.

Capirossi struggled at the Dutch TT a week later, while Gibernau was replaced by German Alex Hofmann for several rounds after undergoing additional surgery. With Gibernau also sidelined for the final round of the season at Valencia, Ducati recalled Bayliss, who had recently been crowned Superbike World Champion. Bayliss won the race, his first MotoGP victory, with Capirossi taking second place for the first Ducati 1–2 finish.

=== Stoner era ===
MotoGP reduced the allowed engine displacement for the 2007 season. Ducati started development of its 800cc motorcycle extremely early: according to racing chief Filippo Preziosi, by August 2006, Ducati had already built twenty 800cc engines with various specifications.

==== 2007 ====
Casey Stoner joined Ducati as Capirossi's latest teammate in 2007. Ducati's bike was fast, and Stoner was particularly able to maximise its speed on tracks with long straights. Stoner dominated the field for most of the season. He became Ducati's first world champion in MotoGP at Motegi on September 23, 2007, with three rounds to spare. Ducati also secured the Constructors' and Teams' championships to secure their first "triple crown".

At the end of season, Ducati's chief engineer Alan Jenkins was awarded the Sir Jackie Stewart Award for brilliance throughout the season.

==== 2008 ====
Casey Stoner was partnered by Marco Melandri in 2008. Melandri had a difficult time adapting to Ducati's GP8 bike, and his two-year contract was reduced to one year by mutual agreement with Ducati midway through the season. Stoner won six races, and finished second in the riders' standings behind Valentino Rossi.

==== 2009 ====
Casey Stoner was partnered by Nicky Hayden in 2009. Halfway through the season, Stoner missed three races due to illness and was replaced by Finnish rookie Mika Kallio. He still managed four race wins, and finished fourth in the standings behind Yamaha duo Valentino Rossi and Jorge Lorenzo, and Honda rider Dani Pedrosa. Hayden took a podium at Indianapolis and finished thirteenth.

==== 2010 ====
Casey Stoner and Nicky Hayden were retained for the 2010 season. On 9 July 2010, Casey Stoner announced that he would leave Ducati for a more competitive bike at Honda in 2011. In his last season with Ducati he took three race wins and finished fourth in the standings again despite five DNFs.

=== Rossi era ===
==== 2011 ====
On 15 August 2010, Valentino Rossi confirmed he had signed a two-year deal to ride for Ducati in 2011 and 2012. Nicky Hayden was retained to partner him. The Ducati-Rossi marriage did not prove to be a happy one: Rossi endured his first winless season in the premier class in 2011. He finished seventh in the standings, and Hayden eighth.

==== 2012 ====
Rossi's struggles on the Ducati continued with another winless season in 2012. He decided to return to his old team Yamaha.

=== Dovizioso era ===
==== 2013 ====
Nicky Hayden signed a one-year contract to remain with Ducati in 2013. He was joined by Italian rider Andrea Dovizioso. The best race result achieved by either rider all season was a fourth place for Dovizioso in Le Mans, but the team saw relatively consistent performance. They finished eighth and ninth behind a group of utterly dominant Hondas and Yamahas.

==== 2014 ====
Dovizioso remained with Ducati in 2014, where he was joined by former team-mate Cal Crutchlow. Dovizioso scored a podium finish in Texas, and finished an impressive fifth in the riders' standings behind the Honda and Yamaha factory duos. Crutchlow finished thirteenth after suffering eight DNFs, but also scored a podium finish in Aragon.

==== 2015 ====
Dovizioso remained with Ducati in 2015. Crutchlow was replaced by Andrea Iannone, a promotion from Ducati satellite team Pramac. They rode the highly anticipated GP15, a full redesign of the Desmosedici by new team race director Gigi Dall'Igna which debuted at the second test in Sepang.

Dovizioso took three consecutive second-place finishes to start the season, and an additional two podiums. Iannone took three podiums but rode with slightly more consistency, and fewer technical problems, than his teammate. Dovizioso finished seventh in the standings, and Iannone fifth.

==== 2016 ====
Dovizioso and Iannone were retained for 2016. Both suffered a string of DNFs but took one race win each in Malaysia (Dovizioso) and Austria (Iannone). They finished fifth and ninth in the standings.

Casey Stoner renewed his relationship with Ducati as a test rider; he outpaced both factory riders on the final day of preseason testing in Sepang.

==== 2017 ====
Dovizioso signed for a further two seasons. Five-time world champion Jorge Lorenzo also joined Ducati on a two-year contract, replacing Iannone.

The 2017 season was the closest Dovizioso ever came to winning a MotoGP championship: he scored six race wins and remained in contention for the title all season long against Honda's dominant lead rider Marc Márquez. At the final race in Valencia, Dovizioso crashed, leaving Márquez to secure the championship without pressure.

Lorenzo struggled to adapt to the Ducati, taking three podium positions but finishing a distant seventh in the standings.

==== 2018 ====
Dovizioso and Lorenzo were retained for 2018. Dovizioso was again Márquez's closest challenger, but finished the season 76 points adrift of him in the standings. Lorenzo took three race wins, just one less than Dovizioso, but suffered from heavy inconsistency and finished the season in ninth. Ducati finished second in the Teams' Championship behind Honda.

==== 2019 ====
Dovizioso was retained for 2019, while Lorenzo left to join Márquez at Honda. He was replaced by Italian rider Danilo Petrucci, who was promoted from Ducati satellite team Pramac.

Dovizioso was championship runner-up for a third consecutive season, but this time finished a colossal 171 points behind Márquez. He scored two race wins, in Qatar and Austria. Petrucci also won a race, in Mugello, and finished sixth in the standings. Ducati finished second in the Teams' Championship behind Honda again.

==== 2020 ====
Dovizioso and Petrucci were retained for the truncated 2020 season.

Dovizioso took a race victory in Austria, while Petrucci won in Le Mans. They finished fourth and twelfth in the standings respectively. Despite a mediocre fourth-place finish for the factory team in the Teams' Championship, Ducati won the Constructors' MotoGP World Championship for the second time.

Dovizioso announced his upcoming departure from Ducati in August, citing his broken relationship with general manager Gigi Dall'Igna. Petrucci was also disposed of.

=== Bagnaia era ===
==== 2021 ====
Italian Francesco Bagnaia and Australian Jack Miller joined the newly rebranded "Ducati Lenovo Team" for 2021.

Bagnaia made a strong start to the season, with three podium finishes in the first four races. After a relative mid-season slump, his performance picked up at the end of the year, and he scored four race wins across the last six rounds to finish championship runner-up. Miller finished in fourth with two race wins. Ducati won the Constructors' Championship for the third time, as well as the Teams' Championship.

==== 2022 ====
Bagnaia and Miller were retained for 2022. Despite a relatively slow start to the season and five DNFs, Bagnaia picked up momentum and scored seven race victories across the season. After finishing ninth at the final race in Valencia, Bagnaia became Ducati's second-ever MotoGP World Champion.

Ducati also won the Constructors' and Teams' championships to secure their second "triple crown".

==== 2023 ====
Bagnaia was retained for 2023, to be partnered by satellite team Gresini promotion Enea Bastianini in an all-Italian lineup.

Bagnaia weathered three DNFs and a DNS to retain his title. He became the first Ducati rider to win multiple and consecutive MotoGP championships. Ducati retained the Constructors' title, but lost the Teams' title to their own satellite team Pramac. An injury-ridden season saw Bastianini finish in fifteenth place in the standings.

==== 2024 ====
Bagnaia and Bastianini were retained for 2024.

Bagnaia took eleven race wins in 2024, over triple that of any of his competitors. However, plagued by three DNFs and poor performance across the sprint races, he lost the championship to Ducati Pramac satellite rider Jorge Martín at the final race of the season. Bastianini finished in fourth place. The factory team secured the Teams' championship.

Ducati broke many constructors' records that season. They took fourteen podium lockouts, seventeen 1–2 podium lockouts, and nineteen race wins, falling just one short of a clean sweep. They retained the Constructors' championship with staggering dominance.

=== Márquez victory ===
==== 2025 ====
Speculation was rife throughout 2024 as to who would occupy the second Ducati factory seat opposite Bagnaia in 2025. It was reported that Jorge Martín had been promised the seat. On 5 June 2024, it was announced that Marc Márquez would instead join the factory Ducati team on a two-year contract. Martín then defected to Aprilia.

A championship battle between Bagnaia and Márquez was anticipated but did not materialise, as Bagnaia struggled to adapt to the new GP25 bike. He won two races, but his performance continued to slump, and he ended the year with five consecutive DNFs to finish fifth in the standings. Márquez romped through the season to clinch a relatively unchallenged ninth world title in Japan with five rounds to spare. He became the factory Ducati team's third MotoGP champion. Ducati won the "triple crown" again: the Riders', Constructors', and Teams' championships.

Ducati decided not to use its flawed GP25 engine for the 2025 season, resorting to a hybrid GP24-GP25 labelled the "GP24.9". This engine will also be used for the 2026 season, before homologation rules are changed in 2027.

==== 2026 ====
Bagnaia and Márquez will be retained for the 2026 season.

== Superbike ==
Ducati Superbike
- 2026 name: Aruba it. Racing Ducati
- Base: Bologna, Italy
- Team principal/s: Stefano Cecconi, CEO Aruba; Ernesto Marinelli, Project Director; Serafino Foti, Team Manager
- Race riders: 7 (Spain) Iker Lecuona; 11 (Italy) Nicolò Bulega
- Motorcycle: Ducati Panigale V4R (2019→)
- Tyres: Pirelli
- Riders' Championships: works team: 12; 1990 Raymond Roche; 1992 Doug Polen; 1994, 1995 Carl Fogarty; 1998, 1999 Carl Fogarty; 2001 Troy Bayliss; 2003 Neil Hodgson; 2004 James Toseland; 2006, 2008 Troy Bayliss; 2022, 2023 Álvaro Bautista customer teams: 3; 1991 Doug Polen; 1996 Troy Corser; 2011 Carlos Checa

Ducati has been taking part in the Superbike World Championship since it began in 1988 until 2010, then came back for 2014, with the race organisation delivered by Bologna-based Feel Racing.

At the end of 2015, Ducati has more wins than any other manufacturer involved in the championship.

=== History ===
Using V-twin engines Ducati was able to dominate the championship for many years. Ducati won its first riders' championship in 1990 with Raymond Roche.

The 1991 title was won by Doug Polen riding for the customer team managed by Eraldo Ferracci. From 1994 to 1999 Carl Fogarty won the title 4 times on Ducatis.

Australian Troy Corser won the 1996 title on a factory-spec Ducati fielded by Austrian team Promotor Racing.

In 2001 Troy Bayliss won the first of his three titles.

In 2003, the rule changes in MotoGP allowing Four-stroke engines meant that the Japanese manufacturers had focused their resources there, leaving the Superbike World Championship with limited factory involvement.

Ducati Corse entered the only 2 Ducati 999s in the field, taking 20 wins from 24 races in a season where all races were won by Ducati.

Neil Hodgson won the title on a Factory Ducati, while the team finished the season with 600 points, a record point score by a constructor in a season. 2004 was a similar story, James Toseland winning the title although Ten Kate Honda's Chris Vermeulen prevented a Ducati clean-sweep.

2006 saw the return of Bayliss to the Superbike World Championship after 3 years in MotoGP. The combination of Bayliss and Ducati proved unstoppable and they dominated the season winning 12 races.

In 2007, Troy Bayliss finished fourth riding once again a Ducati 999. Even though production of the 999 ended in 2006 and the bike was replaced by the Ducati 1098, Ducati produced 150 limited edition 999s to satisfy homologation requirements.

For 2008, Ducati raced a homologated version of the 1098R. The FIM, the sanctioning body for the Superbike World Championship, raised the displacement limit for 2 cylinder engines to 1,200 cc. Bayliss won his third world championship and retired at the end of the 2008 season.

2009 saw Noriyuki Haga, who replaced Bayliss, partnered with Michel Fabrizio. Haga had a fantastic season on Ducati but lost the championship by 6 points; Haga ended the season as second while Fabrizio as third in overall championship standing.

Once again, 2010 began with Noriyuki Haga partnering with Michel Fabrizio for Ducati in SBK.

On 27 August 2010, it was announced that Ducati SBK will no longer compete with a factory team in 2011, after 23 seasons which had brought the marque a total of 29 riders' and manufacturers' championship titles, instead limiting their participation to privateer teams running their works bikes.

During 2011-12 Ducati gave factory support to Althea Racing privateer team, winning the 2011 title with Carlos Checa.

Having parted from Althea at the end of 2012, for 2013 Ducati supported Francis Batta's Alstare Racing team introducing the new 1199 Panigale R in the world championship.

On 15 November 2013, it was announced that Ducati would be returning as a factory team in SBK as Ducati Superbike Team.

For 2014 the returning factory team signed Chaz Davies and Davide Giugliano.

Davies was runner-up in 2015, 2017 and 2018, and third in 2016. Teammate Marco Melandri finished 4th in 2017 and 5th in 2018. The Italian was replaced by Álvaro Bautista in 2019.

The Spaniard began the season with 11 consecutive wins, but later had mixed results.

== Supersport ==
From 2022, Ducati joined the Supersport World Championship with the 955 Panigale V2, ridden by Nicolò Bulega.

Bulega finished the championship fourth in 2022 and as winner in 2023.

== Isle of Man TT ==
At the 2025 event, record holder for the most wins at the Isle of Man TT Michael Dunlop recorded Ducati's first victory since 1995.

== MotoE (Former division) ==
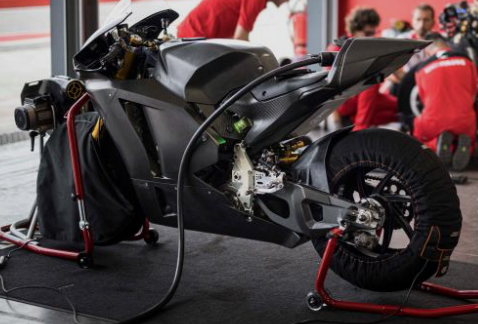
Ducati V21L

New for 2024 is an official entry to the MotoE World Championship electrically powered race series with rider Chaz Davies, under the name Aruba Cloud MotoE team, having taken over he grid-slot previously used by Pramac. The series uses Ducati V21L machines.

== MXGP ==
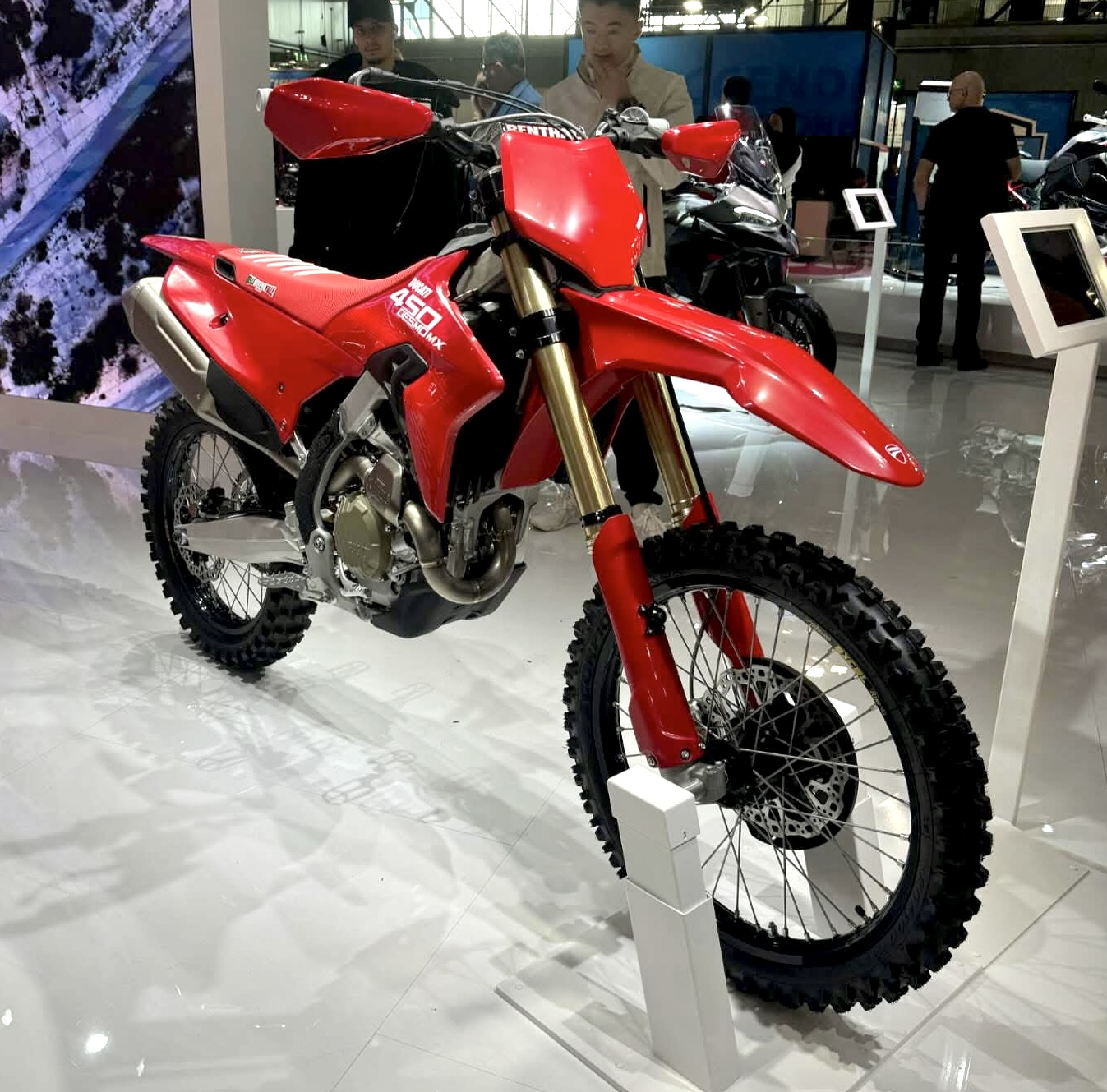
2026 Ducati Desmo450 MX

In 2024, Ducati Corse with R&D – Maddii Racing Team makes its debut at the MXGP World Championship in the Netherlands with crossers Tony Cairoli who is a nine-time world champion and Alessandro Lupino.

In this year's MXGP championship, Cairoli and Lupino relied on the Ducati Desmo450 MX motorbike.

== FIM EWC ==
Ducati Corse has partnered with Team Kagayama to compete in FIM Endurance World Championship at the Suzuka 8 Hours. Ducati Team Kagayama made its debut at the Suzuka 8 Hours endurance race in the 2024 season, marking the first time Ducati has participated with the Panigale V4R. The team finished fourth, with Ryo Mizuno, Joshua Waters, and Hafizh Syahrin as their riders. This debut is seen as a learning experience and the first step towards greater future participation.

== Results ==
=== Grand Prix motorcycle racing ===
==== By rider ====
Year	Class	Team name	Bike	No	Riders	Races	Wins	Podiums	Poles	F. laps	Points	Pos.
2018	MotoGP	Ducati Team	Ducati Desmosedici GP18	04	(Italy) Andrea Dovizioso	18	4	9	2	5	245	**2nd**
2018	MotoGP	Ducati Team	Ducati Desmosedici GP18	99	(Spain) Jorge Lorenzo	14	3	4	4	2	134	9th
2018	MotoGP	Ducati Team	Ducati Desmosedici GP18	19	(Spain) Álvaro Bautista	1 (18)	0	0	0	0	13 (105)	12th
2018	MotoGP	Ducati Team	Ducati Desmosedici GP18	51	(Italy) Michele Pirro	1 (3)	0	0	0	0	0 (14)	22nd
2019	MotoGP	Mission Winnow Ducati; Ducati Team	Ducati Desmosedici GP19	04	(Italy) Andrea Dovizioso	19	2	9	0	1	269	**2nd**
2019	MotoGP	Mission Winnow Ducati; Ducati Team	Ducati Desmosedici GP19	9	(Italy) Danilo Petrucci	19	1	3	0	0	176	6th
2020	MotoGP	Ducati Team	Ducati Desmosedici GP20	04	(Italy) Andrea Dovizioso	14	1	2	0	0	135	4th
2020	MotoGP	Ducati Team	Ducati Desmosedici GP20	9	(Italy) Danilo Petrucci	14	1	1	0	0	78	12th
2021	MotoGP	Ducati Lenovo Team	Ducati Desmosedici GP21	63	(Italy) Francesco Bagnaia	18	4	9	6	4	252	**2nd**
2021	MotoGP	Ducati Lenovo Team	Ducati Desmosedici GP21	43	(Australia) Jack Miller	18	2	5	0	0	181	4th
2021	MotoGP	Ducati Lenovo Team	Ducati Desmosedici GP21	51	(Italy) Michele Pirro	2 (3)	0	0	0	0	9 (12)	23rd
2022	MotoGP	Ducati Lenovo Team	Ducati Desmosedici GP22	63	(Italy) Francesco Bagnaia	20	7	10	5	3	256	**1st**
2022	MotoGP	Ducati Lenovo Team	Ducati Desmosedici GP22	43	(Australia) Jack Miller	20	1	7	1	1	189	5th
2023	MotoGP	Ducati Lenovo Team	Ducati Desmosedici GP23	1	(Italy) Francesco Bagnaia	19	7	15	7	3	467	**1st**
2023	MotoGP	Ducati Lenovo Team	Ducati Desmosedici GP23	23	(Italy) Enea Bastianini	11	1	1	0	2	84	15th
2023	MotoGP	Ducati Lenovo Team	Ducati Desmosedici GP23	51	(Italy) Michele Pirro	3 (5)	0	0	0	0	5	27th
2023	MotoGP	Ducati Lenovo Team	Ducati Desmosedici GP23	9	(Italy) Danilo Petrucci	1	0	0	0	0	5	28th
2024	MotoGP	Ducati Lenovo Team	Ducati Desmosedici GP24	1	(Italy) Francesco Bagnaia	20	11	16	6	6	498	**2nd**
2024	MotoGP	Ducati Lenovo Team	Ducati Desmosedici GP24	23	(Italy) Enea Bastianini	20	2	9	1	3	386	4th
2024	MotoE	Aruba Cloud MotoE Racing Team	Ducati V21L	7	(United Kingdom) Chaz Davies	16	0	0	0	0	35	17th
2024	MotoE	Aruba Cloud MotoE Racing Team	Ducati V21L	80	(Italy) Armando Pontone	16	0	0	0	0	23	18th
2025	MotoGP	Ducati Lenovo Team	Ducati Desmosedici GP25	93	(Spain) Marc Márquez	18	11	15	8	9	545	**1st**
2025	MotoGP	Ducati Lenovo Team	Ducati Desmosedici GP25	63	(Italy) Francesco Bagnaia	22	2	8	3	2	288	5th
2025	MotoGP	Ducati Lenovo Team	Ducati Desmosedici GP25	11	(Italy) Nicolò Bulega	2	0	0	0	0	2	27th
2025	MotoGP	Ducati Lenovo Team	Ducati Desmosedici GP25	51	(Italy) Michele Pirro	2	0	0	0	0	0	29th
2025	MotoE	Aruba Cloud MotoE Racing Team	Ducati V21L	61	(Italy) Alessandro Zaccone	14	3	5	2	1	198	**1st**
2025	MotoE	Aruba Cloud MotoE Racing Team	Ducati V21L	19	(San Marino) Luca Bernardi	14	0	0	0	0	56	13th
2026	MotoGP	Ducati Lenovo Team	Ducati Desmosedici GP26	93	(Spain) Marc Márquez	17	7	8	4	4	431*	**1st***
2026	MotoGP	Ducati Lenovo Team	Ducati Desmosedici GP26	63	(Italy) Francesco Bagnaia	18	0	4	1	2	173*	9th*
2026	MotoGP	Ducati Lenovo Team	Ducati Desmosedici GP26	27	(Spain) Iker Lecuona	0 (4)	0	0	0	0	0 (18)*	21st*

=== MotoGP ===
==== By season ====
(key) (Races in bold indicate pole position; races in italics indicate fastest lap)

Season	Entrants	Machine	Tyre	No	Rider	Race																						Championships					
Season	Entrants	Machine	Tyre	No	Rider	Race																						Riders		Teams		Manufacturers	
Season	Entrants	Machine	Tyre	No	Rider	1	2	3	4	5	6	7	8	9	10	11	12	13	14	15	16	17	18	19	20	21	22	Pos	Pts	Pos	Pts	Pos	Pts
2003	Ducati Marlboro Team	Ducati Desmosedici GP3	M			JPN	SAF	ESP	FRA	ITA	CAT	NED	GBR	GER	CZE	POR	RIO	PAC	MAL	AUS	VAL												
2003	Ducati Marlboro Team	Ducati Desmosedici GP3	M	65	(Italy) Loris Capirossi	3	Ret	**Ret**	Ret	2	1	**6**	4	4	Ret	**3**	6	8	6	2	3							4th	177	3rd	305	2nd	225
2003	Ducati Marlboro Team	Ducati Desmosedici GP3	M	12	(Australia) Troy Bayliss	5	4	3	Ret	Ret	10	9	5	3	3	6	10	Ret	9	Ret	7							6th	128	3rd	305	2nd	225
2004	Ducati Marlboro Team	Ducati Desmosedici GP4	M			SAF	ESP	FRA	ITA	CAT	NED	RIO	GER	GBR	CZE	POR	JPN	QAT	MAL	AUS	VAL												
2004	Ducati Marlboro Team	Ducati Desmosedici GP4	M	65	(Italy) Loris Capirossi	6	12	10	8	10	8	4	Ret	7	5	7	Ret	Ret	6	3	9							9th	117	5th	188	3rd	169
2004	Ducati Marlboro Team	Ducati Desmosedici GP4	M	12	(Australia) Troy Bayliss	14	Ret	8	4	Ret	Ret	Ret	Ret	5	Ret	8	Ret	Ret	10	9	3							14th	71	5th	188	3rd	169
2005	Ducati Marlboro Team; Ducati Team	Ducati Desmosedici GP5	B			ESP	POR	CHN	FRA	ITA	CAT	NED	USA	GBR	GER	CZE	JPN	MAL	QAT	AUS	TUR	VAL											
2005	Ducati Marlboro Team; Ducati Team	Ducati Desmosedici GP5	B	65	(Italy) Loris Capirossi	13	9	12	7	3	12	10	10	6	9	2	**1**	**1**	**10**			7						6th	157	4th	295	3rd	202
2005	Ducati Marlboro Team; Ducati Team	Ducati Desmosedici GP5	B	7	(Spain) Carlos Checa	10	5	Ret	Ret	5	11	9	Ret	5	Ret	8	4	3	6	3	5	4						9th	138	4th	295	3rd	202
2005	Ducati Marlboro Team; Ducati Team	Ducati Desmosedici GP5	B	23	(Japan) Shinichi Ito																DSQ							NC	0	4th	295	3rd	202
2006	Ducati Marlboro Team	Ducati Desmosedici GP6	B			ESP	QAT	TUR	CHN	FRA	ITA	CAT	NED	GBR	GER	USA	CZE	MAL	AUS	JPN	POR	VAL											
2006	Ducati Marlboro Team	Ducati Desmosedici GP6	B	65	(Italy) Loris Capirossi	**1**	3	6	8	2	2	Ret	15	9	5	8	1	2	7	**1**	12	2						3rd	229	3rd	356	3rd	248
2006	Ducati Marlboro Team	Ducati Desmosedici GP6	B	15	(Spain) Sete Gibernau	Ret	4	11	9	8	**5**	Ret			8	10		5	4	4	Ret							13th	95	3rd	356	3rd	248
2006	Ducati Marlboro Team	Ducati Desmosedici GP6	B	66	(Germany) Alex Hofmann								12	13			16											17th	7 (30)	3rd	356	3rd	248
2006	Ducati Marlboro Team	Ducati Desmosedici GP6	B	12	(Australia) Troy Bayliss																	1						19th	25	3rd	356	3rd	248
2007	Ducati Marlboro Team; Ducati Team	Ducati Desmosedici GP7	B			QAT	ESP	TUR	CHN	FRA	ITA	CAT	GBR	NED	GER	USA	CZE	RSM	POR	JPN	AUS	MAL	VAL										
2007	Ducati Marlboro Team; Ducati Team	Ducati Desmosedici GP7	B	27	(Australia) Casey Stoner	1	5	1	1	3	**4**	1	1	2	**5**	**1**	**1**	**1**	3	6	1	1	2					1st	367	1st	533	1st	394
2007	Ducati Marlboro Team; Ducati Team	Ducati Desmosedici GP7	B	65	(Italy) Loris Capirossi	Ret	12	3	6	8	7	6	Ret	Ret	2	Ret	6	5	9	1	2	11	5					7th	166	1st	533	1st	394
2008	Ducati Marlboro Team; Ducati Team	Ducati Desmosedici GP8	B			QAT	ESP	POR	CHN	FRA	ITA	CAT	GBR	NED	GER	USA	CZE	RSM	IND	JPN	AUS	MAL	VAL										
2008	Ducati Marlboro Team; Ducati Team	Ducati Desmosedici GP8	B	1	(Australia) Casey Stoner	1	11	6	3	16	2	**3**	**1**	**1**	**1**	**2**	**Ret**	**Ret**	4	2	**1**	6	**1**					2nd	280	3rd	331	2nd	321
2008	Ducati Marlboro Team; Ducati Team	Ducati Desmosedici GP8	B	33	(Italy) Marco Melandri	11	12	13	5	15	Ret	11	16	13	Ret	16	7	9	19	13	16	16	16					17th	51	3rd	331	2nd	321
2009	Ducati Marlboro Team; Ducati Team	Ducati Desmosedici GP9	B			QAT	JPN	ESP	FRA	ITA	CAT	NED	USA	GER	GBR	CZE	IND	RSM	POR	AUS	MAL	VAL											
2009	Ducati Marlboro Team; Ducati Team	Ducati Desmosedici GP9	B	27	(Australia) Casey Stoner	**1**	4	3	5	1	3	3	4	4	14				2	**1**	1	**DNS**						4th	220	3rd	341	3rd	272
2009	Ducati Marlboro Team; Ducati Team	Ducati Desmosedici GP9	B	69	(United States) Nicky Hayden	12	Ret	15	12	12	10	8	5	8	15	6	3	Ret	8	15	5	5						13th	104	3rd	341	3rd	272
2009	Ducati Marlboro Team; Ducati Team	Ducati Desmosedici GP9	B	36	(Finland) Mika Kallio											Ret	8	7										15th	17 (71)	3rd	341	3rd	272
2010	Ducati Marlboro Team; Ducati Team	Ducati Desmosedici GP10	B			QAT	ESP	FRA	ITA	GBR	NED	CAT	GER	USA	CZE	IND	RSM	ARA	JPN	MAL	AUS	POR	VAL										
2010	Ducati Marlboro Team; Ducati Team	Ducati Desmosedici GP10	B	27	(Australia) Casey Stoner	**Ret**	5	Ret	4	5	3	3	3	2	3	Ret	5	**1**	1	Ret	**1**	Ret	**2**					4th	225	3rd	388	3rd	286
2010	Ducati Marlboro Team; Ducati Team	Ducati Desmosedici GP10	B	69	(United States) Nicky Hayden	4	4	4	Ret	4	7	8	7	5	6	6	Ret	3	12	6	4	5	Ret					7th	163	3rd	388	3rd	286
2011	Ducati Team	Ducati Desmosedici GP11	B			QAT	ESP	POR	FRA	CAT	GBR	NED	ITA	GER	USA	CZE	IND	RSM	ARA	JPN	AUS	MAL	VAL										
2011	Ducati Team	Ducati Desmosedici GP11	B	46	(Italy) Valentino Rossi	7	5	5	3	5	6	4	6	9	6	6	10	7	10	Ret	Ret	C	Ret					7th	139	3rd	271	3rd	180
2011	Ducati Team	Ducati Desmosedici GP11	B	69	(United States) Nicky Hayden	9	3	9	7	8	4	5	10	8	7	7	14	Ret	7	7	7	C	Ret					8th	132	3rd	271	3rd	180
2012	Ducati Team	Ducati Desmosedici GP12	B			QAT	ESP	POR	FRA	CAT	GBR	NED	GER	ITA	USA	IND	CZE	RSM	ARA	JPN	MAL	AUS	VAL										
2012	Ducati Team	Ducati Desmosedici GP12	B	46	(Italy) Valentino Rossi	10	9	7	2	7	9	13	6	5	Ret	7	7	2	8	7	5	7	10					6th	163	4th	285	3rd	192
2012	Ducati Team	Ducati Desmosedici GP12	B	69	(United States) Nicky Hayden	6	8	11	6	9	7	6	10	7	6	DNS		7	Ret	8	4	8	Ret					9th	122	4th	285	3rd	192
2013	Ducati Team	Ducati Desmosedici GP13	B			QAT	AME	ESP	FRA	ITA	CAT	NED	GER	USA	IND	CZE	GBR	RSM	ARA	MAL	AUS	JPN	VAL										
2013	Ducati Team	Ducati Desmosedici GP13	B	04	(Italy) Andrea Dovizioso	7	7	8	4	5	7	10	7	9	10	7	Ret	8	8	8	9	10	9					8th	140	4th	266	3rd	155
2013	Ducati Team	Ducati Desmosedici GP13	B	69	(United States) Nicky Hayden	8	9	7	5	6	Ret	11	9	8	9	8	8	9	9	Ret	7	9	8					9th	126	4th	266	3rd	155
2013	Ducati Test Team	Ducati Desmosedici GP13	B	51	(Italy) Michele Pirro			11		7													10					13th	56	—N/a		3rd	155
2014	Ducati Team	Ducati Desmosedici GP14	B			QAT	AME	ARG	ESP	FRA	ITA	CAT	NED	GER	USA	CZE	GBR	RSM	ARA	JPN	AUS	MAL	VAL										
2014	Ducati Team	Ducati Desmosedici GP14	B	04	(Italy) Andrea Dovizioso	5	3	9	5	8	6	8	2	8	7	6	5	4	Ret	**5**	4	8	4					5th	187	3rd	261	3rd	211
2014	Ducati Team	Ducati Desmosedici GP14	B	35	(United Kingdom) Cal Crutchlow	6	Ret		Ret	11	Ret	Ret	9	10	8	Ret	12	9	3	Ret	Ret	Ret	5					13th	74	3rd	261	3rd	211
2014	Ducati Team	Ducati Desmosedici GP14	B	51	(Italy) Michele Pirro			17																				19th	18	3rd	261	3rd	211
2014	Ducati Test Team	Ducati Desmosedici GP14	B	51	(Italy) Michele Pirro				Ret		11	14				12							9					19th	18	—N/a		3rd	211
2015	Ducati Team	Ducati Desmosedici GP15	B			QAT	AME	ARG	ESP	FRA	ITA	CAT	NED	GER	USA	CZE	GBR	RSM	ARA	JPN	AUS	MAL	VAL										
2015	Ducati Team	Ducati Desmosedici GP15	B	29	(Italy) Andrea Iannone	3	5	4	6	5	**2**	4	4	5	5	4	8	7	4	Ret	3	Ret	Ret					5th	188	3rd	350	3rd	256
2015	Ducati Team	Ducati Desmosedici GP15	B	04	(Italy) Andrea Dovizioso	**2**	2	2	9	3	Ret	Ret	12	Ret	9	6	3	8	5	5	13	Ret	7					7th	162	3rd	350	3rd	256
2015	Ducati Test Team	Ducati Desmosedici GP15	B	51	(Italy) Michele Pirro						8							Ret					12					21st	12	—N/a		3rd	256
2016	Ducati Team	Ducati Desmosedici GP16	M			QAT	ARG	AME	SPA	FRA	ITA	CAT	NED	GER	AUT	CZE	GBR	RSM	ARA	JPN	AUS	MAL	VAL										
2016	Ducati Team	Ducati Desmosedici GP16	M	04	(Italy) Andrea Dovizioso	2	13	Ret	Ret	Ret	5	7	**Ret**	3	2	Ret	6	6	11	2	4	**1**	7					5th	171	3rd	296	3rd	261
2016	Ducati Team	Ducati Desmosedici GP16	M	29	(Italy) Andrea Iannone	Ret	Ret	3	7	Ret	3	Ret	5	5	**1**	8	Ret	WD	WD			Ret	3					9th	112	3rd	296	3rd	261
2016	Ducati Team	Ducati Desmosedici GP16	M	8	(Spain) Héctor Barberá															17	Ret							10th	0 (102) (Note: Non-bracketed number refers to the number accumulated with team, with number in brackets referring to the total accumulated for the season.)	3rd	296	3rd	261
2016	Ducati Team	Ducati Desmosedici GP16	M	51	(Italy) Michele Pirro													7	12									19th	13 (36) (Note: Non-bracketed number refers to the number accumulated with team, with number in brackets referring to the total accumulated for the season.)	3rd	296	3rd	261
2016	Ducati Test Team	Ducati Desmosedici GP16	M	51	(Italy) Michele Pirro						10				12													19th	10 (36) (Note: Non-bracketed number refers to the number accumulated with team, with number in brackets referring to the total accumulated for the season.)	—N/a		3rd	261
2017	Ducati Team	Ducati Desmosedici GP17	M			QAT	ARG	AME	SPA	FRA	ITA	CAT	NED	GER	CZE	AUT	GBR	RSM	ARA	JPN	AUS	MAL	VAL										
2017	Ducati Team	Ducati Desmosedici GP17	M	04	(Italy) Andrea Dovizioso	2	Ret	6	5	4	1	1	5	8	6	1	1	3	7	1	13	1	Ret					2nd	261	3rd	398	3rd	310
2017	Ducati Team	Ducati Desmosedici GP17	M	99	(Spain) Jorge Lorenzo	11	Ret	9	3	6	8	4	15	11	15	4	5	Ret	3	6	15	2	Ret					7th	137	3rd	398	3rd	310
2017	Ducati Test Team	Ducati Desmosedici GP17	M	51	(Italy) Michele Pirro						9							5					9					23rd	25 (0) (Note: Non-bracketed number refers to the number accumulated with team, with number in brackets referring to the total accumulated for the season.)	—N/a		3rd	310
2018	Ducati Team	Ducati Desmosedici GP18	M			QAT	ARG	AME	SPA	FRA	ITA	CAT	NED	GER	CZE	AUT	GBR	RSM	ARA	THA	JPN	AUS	MAL	VAL									
2018	Ducati Team	Ducati Desmosedici GP18	M	04	(Italy) Andrea Dovizioso	**1**	6	5	Ret	Ret	2	Ret	4	7	1	**3**	C	**1**	**2**	2	18	3	6	**1**				2nd	245	2nd	392	2nd	335
2018	Ducati Team	Ducati Desmosedici GP18	M	99	(Spain) Jorge Lorenzo	Ret	15	11	Ret	6	1	**1**	7	6	22	1	C	17	Ret	DNS	DNS		WD	12				9th	134	2nd	392	2nd	335
2018	Ducati Team	Ducati Desmosedici GP18	M	19	(Spain) Álvaro Bautista																	4						12th	13 (105) (Note: Non-bracketed number refers to the number accumulated with team, with number in brackets referring to the total accumulated for the season.)	2nd	392	2nd	335
2018	Ducati Team	Ducati Desmosedici GP18	M	51	(Italy) Michele Pirro																		Ret					22nd	0 (14) (Note: Non-bracketed number refers to the number accumulated with team, with number in brackets referring to the total accumulated for the season.)	2nd	392	2nd	335
2018	Ducati Test Team	Ducati Desmosedici GP18	M	51	(Italy) Michele Pirro						DNS							15						4				22nd	14	—N/a		2nd	335
2019	Mission Winnow Ducati; Ducati Team	Ducati Desmosedici GP19	M			QAT	ARG	AME	SPA	FRA	ITA	CAT	NED	GER	CZE	AUT	GBR	RSM	ARA	THA	JPN	AUS	MAL	VAL									
2019	Mission Winnow Ducati; Ducati Team	Ducati Desmosedici GP19	M	04	(Italy) Andrea Dovizioso	1	3	4	4	2	3	Ret	4	5	2	1	Ret	6	2	4	3	7	3	4				2nd	269	2nd	445	3rd	318
2019	Mission Winnow Ducati; Ducati Team	Ducati Desmosedici GP19	M	9	(Italy) Danilo Petrucci	6	6	6	5	3	1	3	6	4	8	9	7	10	12	9	9	Ret	9	Ret				6th	176	2nd	445	3rd	318
2019	Ducati Test Team	Ducati Desmosedici GP19	M	51	(Italy) Michele Pirro						7							Ret						Ret				22nd	9	—N/a		3rd	318
2020	Ducati Team	Ducati Desmosedici GP20	M			SPA	ANC	CZE	AUT	STY	RSM	EMI	CAT	FRA	ARA	TER	EUR	VAL	POR														
2020	Ducati Team	Ducati Desmosedici GP20	M	04	(Italy) Andrea Dovizioso	3	6	11	1	5	7	8	Ret	4	7	13	8	8	6									4th	135	4th	213	1st	221
2020	Ducati Team	Ducati Desmosedici GP20	M	9	(Italy) Danilo Petrucci	9	Ret	12	7	11	16	10	8	1	15	10	10	15	16									12th	78	4th	213	1st	221
2021	Ducati Lenovo Team	Ducati Desmosedici GP21	M			QAT	DOH	POR	SPA	FRA	ITA	CAT	GER	NED	STY	AUT	GBR	ARA	RSM	AME	EMI	ALR	VAL										
2021	Ducati Lenovo Team	Ducati Desmosedici GP21	M	63	(Italy) Francesco Bagnaia	**3**	6	2	2	4	Ret	7	5	6	11	2	14	**1**	**1**	**3**	**Ret**	**1**	1					2nd	252	1st	433	1st	357
2021	Ducati Lenovo Team	Ducati Desmosedici GP21	M	43	(Australia) Jack Miller	9	9	Ret	1	1	6	3	6	Ret	Ret	11	4	5	5	7	Ret	3	3					4th	181	1st	433	1st	357
2021	Ducati Test Team	Ducati Desmosedici GP21	M	51	(Italy) Michele Pirro														11		12							23rd	9 (12) (Note: Non-bracketed number refers to the number accumulated with team, with number in brackets referring to the total accumulated for the season.)	—N/a		1st	357
2022	Ducati Lenovo Team	Ducati Desmosedici GP22	M			QAT	INA	ARG	AME	POR	SPA	FRA	ITA	CAT	GER	NED	GBR	AUT	RSM	ARA	JPN	THA	AUS	MAL	VAL								
2022	Ducati Lenovo Team	Ducati Desmosedici GP22	M	63	(Italy) Francesco Bagnaia	Ret	15	5	5	8	**1**	**Ret**	1	Ret	**Ret**	**1**	1	1	1	**2**	Ret	3	3	1	9			1st	265	1st	454	1st	448
2022	Ducati Lenovo Team	Ducati Desmosedici GP22	M	43	(Australia) Jack Miller	Ret	4	14	3	Ret	5	2	15	14	3	6	3	3	**Ret**	5	1	2	Ret	6	Ret			5th	189	1st	454	1st	448
2022	Aruba.it Racing	Ducati Desmosedici GP22	M	51	(Italy) Michele Pirro								18	16					Ret									27th	0	—N/a		1st	448
2023	Ducati Lenovo Team	Ducati Desmosedici GP23	M			POR	ARG	AME	SPA	FRA	ITA	GER	NED	GBR	AUT	CAT	RSM	IND	JPN	INA	AUS	THA	MAL	QAT	VAL								
2023	Ducati Lenovo Team	Ducati Desmosedici GP23	M	1	(Italy) Francesco Bagnaia	1^{1}	16^{6}	**Ret**^{1}	1^{2}	**Ret**^{3}	**1**^{1}	**2**^{2}	1^{2}	2	**1**^{1}	**DNS**^{2}	3^{3}	Ret^{2}	2^{3}	1^{8}	2	2**^{7}**	**3**^{3}	2^{5}	1^{5}			1st	467	2nd	561	1st	700
2023	Ducati Lenovo Team	Ducati Desmosedici GP23	M	23	(Italy) Enea Bastianini	DNS			WD		9^{9}	8	Ret^{8}	Ret	Ret^{8}	DNS^{9}				8^{7}	10	13	1^{4}	8	Ret			15th	84	2nd	561	1st	700
2023	Ducati Lenovo Team	Ducati Desmosedici GP23	M	9	(Italy) Danilo Petrucci					11																		28th	5	2nd	561	1st	700
2023	Ducati Lenovo Team	Ducati Desmosedici GP23	M	51	(Italy) Michele Pirro			11										16	16									27th	5	2nd	561	1st	700
2023	Aruba.it Racing	Ducati Desmosedici GP23	M	51	(Italy) Michele Pirro						16						Ret											27th	5	—N/a		1st	700
2023	Aruba.it Racing	Ducati Desmosedici GP23	M	19	(Spain) Álvaro Bautista																		17					31st	0	—N/a		1st	700
2024	Ducati Lenovo Team	Ducati Desmosedici GP24	M			QAT	POR	AME	SPA	FRA	CAT	ITA	NED	GER	GBR	AUT	ARA	RSM	EMI	INA	JPN	AUS	THA	MAL	SLD								
2024	Ducati Lenovo Team	Ducati Desmosedici GP24	M	1	(Italy) Francesco Bagnaia	1^{4}	Ret^{4}	5^{8}	1	3	1	1^{1}	**1**^{1}	1^{3}	3	1^{1}	Ret^{9}	**2**^{2}	**Ret**^{1}	3^{1}	1^{1}	3^{4}	**1**^{3}	**1**	**1**^{1}			2nd	498	1st	884	1st	722
2024	Ducati Lenovo Team	Ducati Desmosedici GP24	M	23	(Italy) Enea Bastianini	5^{6}	**2**^{6}	3^{6}	5	4^{4}	18^{5}	2	3^{4}	4^{4}	1^{1}	3^{4}	5^{7}	3^{4}	1^{3}	Ret^{2}	4^{2}	5^{3}	14^{1}	3^{3}	7^{2}			4th	386	1st	884	1st	722
2025	Ducati Lenovo Team	Ducati Desmosedici GP25	M			THA	ARG	AME	QAT	SPA	FRA	GBR	ARA	ITA	NED	GER	CZE	AUT	HUN	CAT	RSM	JPN	INA	AUS	MAL	POR	VAL						
2025	Ducati Lenovo Team	Ducati Desmosedici GP25	M	93	(Spain) Marc Márquez	**1**^{1}	**1**^{1}	**Ret**^{1}	**1**^{1}	12^{1}	2^{1}	3^{2}	**1**^{1}	**1**^{1}	1^{1}	**1**^{1}	1^{1}	1^{1}	**1**^{1}	2^{1}	1	2^{2}	Ret^{6}					1st	545	1st	835	1st	768
2025	Ducati Lenovo Team	Ducati Desmosedici GP25	M	63	(Italy) Francesco Bagnaia	3^{3}	4^{3}	1^{3}	2^{8}	3^{3}	16	Ret^{6}	3	4^{3}	3^{5}	3	**4**^{7}	8	9	7	Ret	**1**^{1}	Ret	Ret	**Ret**^{1}	Ret^{8}	Ret	5th	288	1st	835	1st	768
2025	Ducati Lenovo Team	Ducati Desmosedici GP25	M	11	(Italy) Nicolò Bulega																					15	15	27th	2	1st	835	1st	768
2025	Ducati Lenovo Team	Ducati Desmosedici GP25	M	51	(Italy) Michele Pirro																			18	17			29th	0	1st	835	1st	768
2026	Ducati Lenovo Team	Ducati Desmosedici GP26	M			THA	BRA	USA	SPA	FRA	CAT	ITA	HUN	CZE	NED	GER	GBR	ARA	RSM	AUT	JPN	INA	AUS	MAL	QAT	POR	VAL						
2026	Ducati Lenovo Team	Ducati Desmosedici GP26	M	93	(Spain) Marc Márquez	Ret^{2}	4^{1}	5	**Ret**^{1}	DNS		7^{5}	**1**^{1}	1^{3}	7^{6}	**1**^{1}	7^{9}	1^{1}	1^{1}	5^{2}	1^{1}	6^{1}	C^{1}	1^{2}	2^{1}			1st*	431*	2nd*	604*	1st*	569*
2026	Ducati Lenovo Team	Ducati Desmosedici GP26	M	63	(Italy) Francesco Bagnaia	9^{9}	Ret^{8}	10^{2}	Ret^{2}	**Ret**^{2}	3^{6}	3^{7}	3^{9}	3^{1}	Ret^{7}	6^{7}	Ret	Ret	Ret	7^{6}	8	Ret^{8}	C	13^{6}	DNS			9th*	173*	2nd*	604*	1st*	569*
2026	Ducati Lenovo Team	Ducati Desmosedici GP26	M	27	(Spain) Iker Lecuona																							21st*	0 (18)*	2nd*	604*	1st*	569*

* Season still in progress.

=== MotoE ===
(key) (Races in bold indicate pole position; races in italics indicate fastest lap)

Year	Team	Bike	Tyres	No.	Riders	1		2		3		4		5		6		7		8		RC	Points	TC	Points
Year	Team	Bike	Tyres	No.	Riders	R1	R2	R1	R2	R1	R2	R1	R2	R1	R2	R1	R2	R1	R2	R1	R2	RC	Points	TC	Points
2024	Aruba Cloud MotoE Racing Team	Ducati V21L	**M**	7	(United Kingdom) Chaz Davies	POR; 9	POR; 15	FRA; 13	FRA; 12	CAT; Ret	CAT; 14	ITA; 14	ITA; 16	NED; 9	NED; Ret	GER; 14	GER; 16	AUT; 13	AUT; 14	RSM; 15	RSM; 15	17th	35	9th	58
2024	Aruba Cloud MotoE Racing Team	Ducati V21L	**M**	80	(Italy) Armando Pontone	POR; 10	POR; 16	FRA; 12	FRA; Ret	CAT; 14	CAT; 15	ITA; 16	ITA; 15	NED; 12	NED; 16	GER; Ret	GER; 12	AUT; 15	AUT; 16	RSM; 16	RSM; 16	18th	23	9th	58
2025	Aruba Cloud MotoE Racing Team	Ducati V21L	**M**	61	(Italy) Alessandro Zaccone	**FRA**; 3	**FRA**; Ret	NED; 2	NED; 1	AUT; 7	AUT; 6	HUN; 5	HUN; 6	CAT; 4	CAT; 8	RSM; 1	RSM; 4	**POR**; 1	**POR**; 4			1st	198	3rd	254
2025	Aruba Cloud MotoE Racing Team	Ducati V21L	**M**	19	(San Marino) Luca Bernardi	FRA; 13	FRA; 9	NED; Ret	NED; 13	AUT; 14	AUT; 13	HUN; Ret	HUN; 12	CAT; 13	CAT; 10	RSM; 12	RSM; 9	POR; 10	POR; 8			13th	56	3rd	254

=== Superbike World Championship ===
==== By season ====
(key) (Races in bold indicate pole position; races in italics indicate fastest lap)

Year	Team	Bike	Tyres	No.	Riders	1		2		3		4		5		6		7		8		9		10		11		12		13		14		RC	Points	TC	Points	MC	Points
Year	Team	Bike	Tyres	No.	Riders	R1	R2	R1	R2	R1	R2	R1	R2	R1	R2	R1	R2	R1	R2	R1	R2	R1	R2	R1	R2	R1	R2	R1	R2	R1	R2	R1	R2	RC	Points	TC	Points	MC	Points
2000	Ducati Infostrada	996	M			RSA	RSA	AUS	AUS	JPN	JPN	GBR	GBR	ITA	ITA	GER	GER	SMR	SMR	SPA	SPA	USA	USA	EUR	EUR	NED	NED	GER	GER	GBR	GBR								
2000	Ducati Infostrada	996	M	21	(Australia) Troy Bayliss					Ret	Ret			4	4	1	4	2	2	4	3	**Ret**	**7**	1	2	Ret	Ret	3	2	2	Ret			6th	243	—N/a	—N/a	1st	439
2000	Ducati Infostrada	996	M	155	(United States) Ben Bostrom	9	7	15	14	Ret	13	15	8	7	10																			7th	45 (174)	—N/a	—N/a	1st	439
2000	Ducati Infostrada	996	M	19	(Spain) Juan Borja											13	12	4	5	Ret	8	9	Ret	11	Ret	2	3	Ret	DNS	5	14			11th	101 (123)	—N/a	—N/a	1st	439
2000	Ducati Infostrada	996	M	1	(United Kingdom) Carl Fogarty	3	Ret	2	Ret																									26th	36	—N/a	—N/a	1st	439
2000	Ducati Infostrada	996	M	22	(Italy) Luca Cadalora							Ret	17																					NC	0	—N/a	—N/a	1st	439
2001	Ducati Infostrada	996 R	M			SPA	SPA	RSA	RSA	AUS	AUS	JPN	JPN	ITA	ITA	GBR	GBR	GER	GER	SMR	SMR	USA	USA	EUR	EUR	GER	GER	NED	NED	ITA	ITA								
2001	Ducati Infostrada	996 R	M	21	(Australia) Troy Bayliss	2	2	2	2	3	C	13	15	**1**	**1**	13	9	2	1	1	2	4	4	5	3	Ret	3	**1**	**1**	Ret	DNS			1st	369	—N/a	—N/a	1st	553
2001	Ducati Infostrada	996 R	M	11	(Spain) Rubén Xaus	Ret	8	9	5	Ret	C	18	22	Ret	6	7	10	19	6	10	6	7	10	6	12	2	1	2	2	1	2			6th	236	—N/a	—N/a	1st	553
2002	Ducati Infostrada	999 F02	M			SPA	SPA	AUS	AUS	RSA	RSA	JPN	JPN	ITA	ITA	GBR	GBR	GER	GER	SMR	SMR	USA	USA	GBR	GBR	GER	GER	NED	NED	ITA	ITA								
2002	Ducati Infostrada	999 F02	M	1	(Australia) Troy Bayliss	**1**	**1**	1	1	1	1	5	4	1	1	**5**	**1**	**1**	**1**	**1**	**1**	1	2	3	2	2	2	2	Ret	2	2			2nd	541	—N/a	—N/a	1st	575
2002	Ducati Infostrada	999 F02	M	11	(Spain) Rubén Xaus	5	Ret	3	3	3	2	Ret	9	6	Ret	8	3	3	3	Ret	Ret	2	19	5	6	Ret	5	4	Ret	3	3			6th	249	—N/a	—N/a	1st	575
2003	Ducati Fila	999 F03	M			SPA	SPA	AUS	AUS	JPN	JPN	ITA	ITA	GER	GER	GBR	GBR	SMR	SMR	USA	USA	GBR	GBR	NED	NED	ITA	ITA	FRA	FRA										
2003	Ducati Fila	999 F03	M	100	(United Kingdom) Neil Hodgson	**1**	**1**	**1**	**1**	1	1	**1**	**1**	**1**	**2**	**1**	**1**	**Ret**	**2**	2	2	2	5	2	1	2	4	1	Ret					1st	489	—N/a	—N/a	1st	600
2003	Ducati Fila	999 F03	M	11	(Spain) Rubén Xaus	2	2	2	2	4	4	7	Ret	Ret	5	3	3	1	1	Ret	1	Ret	4	1	2	**1**	**1**	2	1					2nd	386	—N/a	—N/a	1st	600
2004	Ducati Fila	999 F04	P			SPA	SPA	AUS	AUS	SMR	SMR	ITA	ITA	GER	GER	GBR	GBR	USA	USA	EUR	EUR	NED	NED	ITA	ITA	FRA	FRA												
2004	Ducati Fila	999 F04	P	52	(United Kingdom) James Toseland	1	2	3	Ret	10	6	2	2	2	2	Ret	5	4	2	7	Ret	1	2	3	2	1	2							1st	336	—N/a	—N/a	1st	530
2004	Ducati Fila	999 F04	P	55	(France) Régis Laconi	**Ret**	**Ret**	**1**	**Ret**	1	2	**1**	**1**	6	1	**Ret**	**3**	5	3	2	Ret	3	5	**1**	**1**	3	3							2nd	327	—N/a	—N/a	1st	530
2005	Ducati Xerox	999 F05	P			QAT	QAT	AUS	AUS	SPA	SPA	ITA	ITA	EUR	EUR	SMR	SMR	CZE	CZE	GBR	GBR	NED	NED	GER	GER	ITA	ITA	FRA	FRA										
2005	Ducati Xerox	999 F05	P	1	(United Kingdom) James Toseland	6	6	14	Ret	8	19	3	5	3	1	4	4	2	8	Ret	7	2	3	4	11	4	C	3	6					4th	254	—N/a	—N/a	3rd	385
2005	Ducati Xerox	999 F05	P	55	(France) Régis Laconi	**3**	**2**	7	7	DNS	DNS	4	2	1	Ret	1	1	3	7	3	5	DNS	DNS			9	C	DNS	DNS					6th	221	—N/a	—N/a	3rd	385
2005	Ducati Xerox	999 F05	P	57	(Italy) Lorenzo Lanzi																			**8**	**1**									9th	33 (150)	—N/a	—N/a	3rd	385
2006	Ducati Xerox	999 F06	P			QAT	QAT	AUS	AUS	SPA	SPA	ITA	ITA	EUR	EUR	SMR	SMR	CZE	CZE	GBR	GBR	NED	NED	GER	GER	ITA	ITA	FRA	FRA										
2006	Ducati Xerox	999 F06	P	21	(Australia) Troy Bayliss	**2**	**2**	**6**	**1**	1	1	1	1	1	1	1	12	Ret	8	**1**	**2**	Ret	1	**7**	**3**	**5**	**1**	4	1					1st	431	1st	600	1st	450
2006	Ducati Xerox	999 F06	P	57	(Italy) Lorenzo Lanzi	Ret	6	11	Ret	3	3	9	11	13	16	7	7	Ret	9	12	11	7	6	8	6	6	7	8	7					8th	169	1st	600	1st	450
2007	Ducati Xerox Team	999 F07	P			QAT	QAT	AUS	AUS	EUR	EUR	SPA	SPA	NED	NED	ITA	ITA	GBR	GBR	SMR	SMR	CZE	CZE	GBR	GBR	GER	GER	ITA	ITA	FRA	FRA								
2007	Ducati Xerox Team	999 F07	P	21	(Australia) Troy Bayliss	5	8	**1**	**2**	**Ret**	**DNS**	**3**	**6**	4	1	2	**3**	**1**	C	1	1	Ret	6	**Ret**	**7**	4	1	**2**	**1**	2	5			4th	372	3rd	564	3rd	439
2007	Ducati Xerox Team	999 F07	P	57	(Italy) Lorenzo Lanzi	3	7	6	7	5	5	6	5	5	Ret	7	Ret	7	C	6	9	8	7	9	12	8	12	6	7	Ret	DNS			7th	192	3rd	564	3rd	439
2008	Ducati Xerox Team	1098 F08	P			QAT	QAT	AUS	AUS	SPA	SPA	NED	NED	ITA	ITA	USA	USA	GER	GER	SMR	SMR	CZE	CZE	GBR	GBR	EUR	EUR	ITA	ITA	FRA	FRA	POR	POR						
2008	Ducati Xerox Team	1098 F08	P	21	(Australia) Troy Bayliss	1	4	**1**	**1**	2	2	**1**	**1**	**3**	**Ret**	Ret	22	2	4	3	3	**1**	**1**	**2**	**11**	**1**	**Ret**	**6**	**16**	3	1	**1**	**1**	1st	460	1st	683	1st	570
2008	Ducati Xerox Team	1098 F08	P	84	(Italy) Michel Fabrizio	9	5	3	19	Ret	13	Ret	Ret	9	5	3	3	7	6	Ret	11	3	2	12	6	Ret	5	7	2	Ret	14	Ret	2	8th	223	1st	683	1st	570
2008	Ducati Xerox Team	1098 F08	P	59	(Italy) Niccolò Canepa																	13	Ret											32nd	3	1st	683	1st	570
2009	Ducati Xerox Team	1098R	P			AUS	AUS	QAT	QAT	SPA	SPA	NED	NED	ITA	ITA	RSA	RSA	USA	USA	SMR	SMR	GBR	GBR	CZE	CZE	GER	GER	ITA	ITA	FRA	FRA	POR	POR						
2009	Ducati Xerox Team	1098R	P	41	(Japan) Noriyuki Haga	1	2	2	2	1	1	2	1	2	Ret	1	1	9	8	5	3	3	Ret	8	6	**2**	**Ret**	1	2	2	1	Ret	2	2nd	456	1st	838	1st	572
2009	Ducati Xerox Team	1098R	P	84	(Italy) Michel Fabrizio	4	5	Ret	Ret	2	3	9	4	1	2	2	2	3	2	3	2	12	3	Ret	3	7	9	**3**	**1**	4	13	5	1	3rd	382	1st	838	1st	572
2010	Ducati Xerox Team	1098R	P			AUS	AUS	POR	POR	SPA	SPA	NED	NED	ITA	ITA	RSA	RSA	USA	USA	SMR	SMR	CZE	CZE	GBR	GBR	GER	GER	ITA	ITA	FRA	FRA								
2010	Ducati Xerox Team	1098R	P	41	(Japan) Noriyuki Haga	3	5	8	8	5	1	10	Ret	11	6	17	10	3	4	7	9	6	5	14	13	Ret	1	3	2	7	5			6th	258	5th	453	2nd	424
2010	Ducati Xerox Team	1098R	P	84	(Italy) Michel Fabrizio	2	3	11	11	Ret	Ret	13	12	7	Ret	1	8	Ret	9	4	3	Ret	3	4	Ret	Ret	19	7	Ret	6	3			8th	195	5th	453	2nd	424
2014	Ducati Superbike Team	1199 Panigale R	P			AUS	AUS	SPA	SPA	NED	NED	ITA	ITA	GBR	GBR	MAL	MAL	ITA	ITA	POR	POR	USA	USA	SPA	SPA	FRA	FRA	QAT	QAT										
2014	Ducati Superbike Team	1199 Panigale R	P	7	(United Kingdom) Chaz Davies	8	7	4	Ret	7	8	2	2	5	5	4	8	4	Ret	18	3	Ret	DNS	3	4	Ret	9	7	5					6th	215	4th	396	4th	291
2014	Ducati Superbike Team	1199 Panigale R	P	34	(Italy) Davide Giugliano	4	4	8	7	Ret	3	Ret	6	**Ret**	**4**	8	10	8	9	7	2	4	Ret	Ret	Ret	7	Ret	**5**	**8**					8th	181	4th	396	4th	291
2015	Aruba.it Racing – Ducati SBK Team	1199 Panigale R	P			AUS	AUS	THA	THA	SPA	SPA	NED	NED	ITA	ITA	GBR	GBR	POR	POR	ITA	ITA	USA	USA	MAL	MAL	SPA	SPA	FRA	FRA	QAT	QAT								
2015	Aruba.it Racing – Ducati SBK Team	1199 Panigale R	P	7	(United Kingdom) Chaz Davies	3	3	11	15	2	1	2	2	Ret	Ret	3	3	3	4	3	4	**1**	**1**	2	1	2	1	6	2	4	2			2nd	416	2nd	626	2nd	471
2015	Aruba.it Racing – Ducati SBK Team	1199 Panigale R	P	34	(Italy) Davide Giugliano									**3**	**4**	17	5	**4**	**2**	4	2	4	Ret											11th	119	2nd	626	2nd	471
2015	Aruba.it Racing – Ducati SBK Team	1199 Panigale R	P	112	(Spain) Xavi Forés					6	5	7	8																	7	DNS			19th	47	2nd	626	2nd	471
2015	Aruba.it Racing – Ducati SBK Team	1199 Panigale R	P	55	(Italy) Michele Pirro															8	8					6	7							21st	35	2nd	626	2nd	471
2015	Aruba.it Racing – Ducati SBK Team	1199 Panigale R	P	21	(Australia) Troy Bayliss	13	16	9	11																									24th	15	2nd	626	2nd	471
2015	Aruba.it Racing – Ducati SBK Team	1199 Panigale R	P	99	(Italy) Luca Scassa															WD	WD							13	9					27th	10	2nd	626	2nd	471
2016	Aruba.it Racing – Ducati	1199 Panigale R	P			AUS	AUS	THA	THA	SPA	SPA	NED	NED	ITA	ITA	MAL	MAL	GBR	GBR	ITA	ITA	USA	USA	GER	GER	FRA	FRA	SPA	SPA	QAT	QAT								
2016	Aruba.it Racing – Ducati	1199 Panigale R	P	7	(United Kingdom) Chaz Davies	2	10	4	3	1	1	2	5	**1**	**1**	3	4	Ret	3	4	Ret	Ret	3	**1**	**6**	1	1	1	1	1	1			3rd	445	2nd	642	2nd	517
2016	Aruba.it Racing – Ducati	1199 Panigale R	P	34	(Italy) Davide Giugliano	4	3	18	10	5	6	Ret	8	5	4	6	2	2	7	14	3	Ret	2	7	Ret	DNS	DNS	Ret	13	Ret	DNS			7th	197	2nd	642	2nd	517
2017	Aruba.it Racing – Ducati	1199 Panigale R	P			AUS	AUS	THA	THA	SPA	SPA	NED	NED	ITA	ITA	GBR	GBR	ITA	ITA	USA	USA	GER	GER	POR	POR	FRA	FRA	SPA	SPA	QAT	QAT								
2017	Aruba.it Racing – Ducati	1199 Panigale R	P	7	(United Kingdom) Chaz Davies	2	2	2	6	**Ret**	1	Ret	3	**1**	1	8	3	Ret	DNS	1	3	1	1	2	Ret	10	1	2	3	2	2			2nd	403	2nd	730	2nd	520
2017	Aruba.it Racing – Ducati	1199 Panigale R	P	33	(Italy) Marco Melandri	Ret	3	4	3	2	3	3	Ret	3	5	4	Ret	15	1	4	4	4	3	3	3	2	5	**Ret**	2	3	6			4th	327	2nd	730	2nd	520
2018	Aruba.it Racing – Ducati	1199 Panigale R	P			AUS	AUS	THA	THA	SPA	SPA	NED	NED	ITA	ITA	GBR	GBR	CZE	CZE	USA	USA	ITA	ITA	POR	POR	FRA	FRA	ARG	ARG	QAT	QAT								
2018	Aruba.it Racing – Ducati	1199 Panigale R	P	7	(United Kingdom) Chaz Davies	3	Ret	3	1	2	1	3	5	4	2	8	5	8	3	**2**	2	2	4	4	4	5	2	Ret	4	8	C			2nd	356	2nd	653	2nd	459
2018	Aruba.it Racing – Ducati	1199 Panigale R	P	33	(Italy) Marco Melandri	1	1	8	7	**4**	3	6	7	3	Ret	22	11	2	15	5	Ret	7	3	2	3	6	5	**2**	3	5	C			5th	297	2nd	653	2nd	459

Year	Team	Bike	Tyres	No.	Riders	1			2			3			4			5			6			7			8			9			10			11			12			13			RC	Points	TC	Points	MC	Points
Year	Team	Bike	Tyres	No.	Riders	R1	SR	R2	R1	SR	R2	R1	SR	R2	R1	SR	R2	R1	SR	R2	R1	SR	R2	R1	SR	R2	R1	SR	R2	R1	SR	R2	R1	SR	R2	R1	SR	R2	R1	SR	R2	R1	SR	R2	RC	Points	TC	Points	MC	Points
2019	Aruba.it Racing – Ducati	Panigale V4R	P			AUS	AUS	AUS	THA	THA	THA	SPA	SPA	SPA	NED	NED	NED	ITA	ITA	ITA	SPA	SPA	SPA	ITA	ITA	ITA	GBR	GBR	GBR	USA	USA	USA	POR	POR	POR	FRA	FRA	FRA	ARG	ARG	ARG	QAT	QAT	QAT						
2019	Aruba.it Racing – Ducati	Panigale V4R	P	19	(Spain) Álvaro Bautista	1	1	1	**1**	**1**	1	**1**	**1**	1	**1**	C	**1**	2	3	C	1	1	NC	3	1	14	Ret	4	3	17	DNS	Ret	4	2	1	5	5	Ret	**1**	**2**	5	4	2	3	2nd	498	2nd	792	2nd	623
2019	Aruba.it Racing – Ducati	Panigale V4R	P	7	(United Kingdom) Chaz Davies	10	10	7	15	8	Ret	3	4	3	7	C	5	**Ret**	**2**	C	7	10	Ret	5	17	7	10	7	9	2	2	1	2	10	16	Ret	4	4	DNS	4	2	2	5	2	6th	294	2nd	792	2nd	623
2020	Aruba.it Racing – Ducati	Panigale V4R	P			AUS	AUS	AUS	SPA	SPA	SPA	POR	POR	POR	SPA	SPA	SPA	SPA	SPA	SPA	SPA	SPA	SPA	FRA	FRA	FRA	POR	POR	POR																					
2020	Aruba.it Racing – Ducati	Panigale V4R	P	45	(United Kingdom) Scott Redding	3	3	3	**1**	**2**	1	7	5	2	1	2	4	Ret	1	3	2	8	6	5	4	1	Ret	6	2																2nd	305	1st	578	2nd	391
2020	Aruba.it Racing – Ducati	Panigale V4R	P	7	(United Kingdom) Chaz Davies	8	13	5	4	5	2	11	Ret	4	2	5	2	3	5	Ret	3	4	1	4	5	3	2	4	1																3rd	273	1st	578	2nd	391
2021	Aruba.it Racing – Ducati	Panigale V4R	P			SPA	SPA	SPA	POR	POR	POR	ITA	ITA	ITA	GBR	GBR	GBR	NED	NED	NED	CZE	CZE	CZE	SPA	SPA	SPA	FRA	FRA	FRA	SPA	SPA	SPA	SPA	SPA	SPA	POR	POR	POR	ARG	ARG	ARG	INA	INA	INA						
2021	Aruba.it Racing – Ducati	Panigale V4R	P	45	(United Kingdom) Scott Redding	4	8	1	1	3	16	4	4	4	Ret	18	4	2	5	2	2	2	1	1	1	2	12	5	3	1	15	3	3	C	2	2	2	2	**9**	**2**	1	3	C	2	3rd	501	2nd	783	2nd	594
2021	Aruba.it Racing – Ducati	Panigale V4R	P	21	(Italy) Michael Ruben Rinaldi	7	11	16	5	5	Ret	1	1	2	12	10	8	Ret	2	8	4	10	5	10	13	7	4	10	7	3	5	1	Ret	C	7	4	Ret	7	3	8	5	12	C	Ret	5th	282	2nd	783	2nd	594
2022	Aruba.it Racing – Ducati	Panigale V4R	P			SPA	SPA	SPA	NED	NED	NED	POR	POR	POR	ITA	ITA	ITA	GBR	GBR	GBR	CZE	CZE	CZE	FRA	FRA	FRA	SPA	SPA	SPA	POR	POR	POR	ARG	ARG	ARG	INA	INA	INA	AUS	AUS	AUS									
2022	Aruba.it Racing – Ducati	Panigale V4R	P	19	(Spain) Álvaro Bautista	2	1	1	2	3	1	1	3	2	**1**	**2**	1	Ret	4	2	1	3	2	1	2	Ret	1	1	1	2	2	1	1	2	1	2	4	2	**5**	**1**	1				1st	601	1st	894	1st	632
2022	Aruba.it Racing – Ducati	Panigale V4R	P	21	(Italy) Michael Ruben Rinaldi	4	4	4	Ret	8	7	9	8	8	3	10	3	6	6	4	7	4	Ret	6	7	2	4	5	2	7	5	4	5	4	5	5	8	10	11	22	7				4th	293	1st	894	1st	632
2023	Aruba.it Racing – Ducati	Panigale V4R	P			AUS	AUS	AUS	INA	INA	INA	NED	NED	NED	SPA	SPA	SPA	EMI	EMI	EMI	GBR	GBR	GBR	ITA	ITA	ITA	CZE	CZE	CZE	FRA	FRA	FRA	SPA	SPA	SPA	POR	POR	POR	SPA	SPA	SPA									
2023	Aruba.it Racing – Ducati	Panigale V4R	P	1	(Spain) Álvaro Bautista	1	1	1	1	Ret	1	**1**	**1**	1	**1**	**1**	1	**1**	**1**	1	1	2	1	1	2	Ret	12	3	1	10	2	1	Ret	1	1	1	1	1	**1**	**1**	1				1st	628	1st	879	1st	704
2023	Aruba.it Racing – Ducati	Panigale V4R	P	21	(Italy) Michael Ruben Rinaldi	14	2	2	Ret	7	4	15	13	10	Ret	8	3	2	3	Ret	13	17	Ret	5	5	5	14	5	5	2	Ret	Ret	1	5	3	Ret	6	3	8	11	6				5th	251	1st	879	1st	704
2024	Aruba.it Racing – Ducati	Panigale V4R	P			AUS	AUS	AUS	SPA	SPA	SPA	NED	NED	NED	ITA	ITA	ITA	GBR	GBR	GBR	CZE	CZE	CZE	POR	POR	POR	FRA	FRA	FRA	ITA	ITA	ITA	SPA	SPA	SPA	POR	POR	POR	SPA	SPA	SPA									
2024	Aruba.it Racing – Ducati	Panigale V4R	P	11	(Italy) Nicolò Bulega	**1**	**5**	5	2	4	2	11	2	8	2	2	2	4	2	2	6	2	2	7	5	2	Ret	1	1	**2**	**4**	3	**Ret**	**3**	3	2	1	2	**1**	1	2				2nd	484	1st	841	1st	644
2024	Aruba.it Racing – Ducati	Panigale V4R	P	1	(Spain) Álvaro Bautista	15	4	2	3	3	1	3	1	2	3	17	3	3	6	5	4	NC	Ret	2	6	19	2	Ret	DNS	3	6	2	4	1	1	19	3	3	Ret	9	Ret				3rd	357	1st	841	1st	644
2025	Aruba.it Racing – Ducati	Panigale V4R	P			AUS	AUS	AUS	POR	POR	POR	NED	NED	NED	ITA	ITA	ITA	CZE	CZE	CZE	EMI	EMI	EMI	GBR	GBR	GBR	HUN	HUN	HUN	FRA	FRA	FRA	ARA	ARA	ARA	POR	POR	POR	SPA	SPA	SPA									
2025	Aruba.it Racing – Ducati	Panigale V4R	P	11	(Italy) Nicolò Bulega	**1**	**1**	1	2	2	2	1	Ret	Ret	**1**	**1**	1	2	2	1	**2**	**Ret**	2	2	2	2	2	13	2	2	2	2	**2**	**1**	1	2	2	1	**1**	**1**	1				2nd	603	1st	940	1st	647
2025	Aruba.it Racing – Ducati	Panigale V4R	P	19	(Spain) Álvaro Bautista	3	19	2	Ret	3	3	Ret	3	2	3	3	3	5	5	Ret	6	5	3	Ret	4	3	3	3	Ret	16	Ret	4	Ret	3	3	3	3	3	3	2	2				3rd	337	1st	940	1st	647
2026	Aruba.it Racing – Ducati	Panigale V4R	P			AUS	AUS	AUS	POR	POR	POR	NED	NED	NED	HUN	HUN	HUN	CZE	CZE	CZE	ARA	ARA	ARA	EMI	EMI	EMI	GBR	GBR	GBR	FRA	FRA	FRA	ITA	ITA	ITA	POR	POR	POR	SPA	SPA	SPA									
2026	Aruba.it Racing – Ducati	Panigale V4R	P	11	(Italy) Nicolò Bulega	**1**	**1**	1	**1**	**1**	1	**1**	**1**	1	**1**	**1**	1	**1**	**1**	1	**1**	**1**	1	**1**	**1**	1	**2**	**1**	1	**1**	**1**	1	2	2	2	**1**	**1**	1	**1**	**1**	1				1st	726	1st	1289	1st	744
2026	Aruba.it Racing – Ducati	Panigale V4R	P	7	(Spain) Iker Lecuona	6	9	8	2	2	2	2	2	2	2	2	2	2	2	2	2	2	2	2	2	2	1	Ret	2	2	2	2	**1**	**1**	1	2	2	2	3	2	2				2nd	563	1st	1289	1st	744

=== Supersport World Championship ===
Year	Team	Bike	Tyres	No.	Riders	1		2		3		4		5		6		7		8		9		10		11		12		RC	Points	TC	Points	MC	Points
Year	Team	Bike	Tyres	No.	Riders	R1	R2	R1	R2	R1	R2	R1	R2	R1	R2	R1	R2	R1	R2	R1	R2	R1	R2	R1	R2	R1	R2	R1	R2	RC	Points	TC	Points	MC	Points
2022	Aruba.it Racing WorldSSP Team	Ducati Panigale V2	**P**	11	(Italy) Nicolò Bulega	SPA; 5	SPA; 3	NED; 3	NED; 4	POR; 3	POR; Ret	ITA; 3	ITA; 3	GBR; Ret	GBR; 3	CZE; 9	CZE; 2	FRA; 11	FRA; 3	SPA; Ret	SPA; 14	POR; 15	POR; 10	ARG; 11	ARG; 8	INA; 6	INA; 7	AUS; 2	AUS; 4	4th	242	6th	242	2nd	368
2023	Aruba.it Racing WorldSSP Team	Ducati Panigale V2	**P**	11	(Italy) Nicolò Bulega	AUS; 1	AUS; 1	**INA**; 5	**INA**; 3	**NED**; 1	**NED**; 1	**SPA**; 1	**SPA**; Ret	**EMI**; 1	**EMI**; 2	**GBR**; 1	**GBR**; 1	ITA; 3	ITA; 2	**CZE**; 1	**CZE**; 16	**FRA**; 1	**FRA**; 1	**SPA**; 1	**SPA**; 1	**POR**; 1	**POR**; 2	**SPA**; 1	**SPA**; 1	1st	503	2nd	503	1st	540
2024	Aruba.it Racing WorldSSP Team	Ducati Panigale V2	**P**	99	(Spain) Adrián Huertas	**AUS**; Ret	AUS; 3	**SPA**; 1	SPA; 32	NED; 1	NED; 2	EMI; 1	**EMI**; 1	**GBR**; 1	**GBR**; 1	CZE; 1	CZE; 1	**POR**; 2	POR; 12	**FRA**; 4	FRA; 3	**ITA**; 1	**ITA**; 2	**SPA**; 1	SPA; 5	EST; 2	EST; 2	**SPA**; 3	SPA; 4	1st	439	2nd	439	1st	556
2025	Feel Racing WorldSSP Team	Ducati Panigale V2	**P**	65	(Germany) Philipp Öttl	AUS	AUS	POR; 11	POR; 10	NED; 7	NED; 13	ITA; 15	ITA; Ret	CZE; 7	CZE; 3	EMI; 10	EMI; 4	GBR; 6	GBR; 6	HUN; 9	HUN; Ret	FRA; 9	FRA; 8	ARA; 4	**ARA**; 4	POR; 4	POR; 2	SPA; 8	SPA; 6	6th	187	8th	187	2nd	381
2026	Feel Racing WorldSSP Team	Ducati Panigale V2	**P**	65	(Germany) Philipp Öttl	AUS; 2	AUS; 11	POR; 6	POR; 6	NED; 7	NED; 1	HUN; 6	HUN; NC	CZE; 9	CZE; 8	ARA; 10	ARA; 6	EMI; NC	EMI; 15	GBR; 6	GBR; 9	FRA; 28	FRA; 19	ITA; 11	ITA; 7	POR; 10	POR; 6	SPA; 16	SPA; 12	8th	173	9th	173	2nd	362

=== MXGP ===
Year	Class	Bike	Team	Tyres	No.	Riders	1		2		3		4		5		6		7		8		9		10		11		12		13		14		15		16		17		18		19		20		Points	RC	Points	MC
Year	Class	Bike	Team	Tyres	No.	Riders	R1	R2	R1	R2	R1	R2	R1	R2	R1	R2	R1	R2	R1	R2	R1	R2	R1	R2	R1	R2	R1	R2	R1	R2	R1	R2	R1	R2	R1	R2	R1	R2	R1	R2	R1	R2	R1	R2	R1	R2	Points	RC	Points	MC
2024	MXGP	Desmo450 MX	Ducati Corse R&D – Maddii Racing Team	P	222	(Italy) Tony Cairoli	ARG	ARG	ESP	ESP	SAR	SAR	TRE	TRE	POR	POR	GAL	GAL	FRA	FRA	GER	GER	LAT	LAT	ITA	ITA	WNT	WNT	LOM	LOM	CZE	CZE	FLA	FLA	SWE	SWE	NED; 15^{+4}	NED; Ret	SUI	SUI	TUR	TUR	CHN	CHN	CAS	CAS	10	39th	19	9th
2024	MXGP	Desmo450 MX	Ducati Corse R&D – Maddii Racing Team	P	77	(Italy) Alessandro Lupino	ARG	ARG	ESP	ESP	SAR	SAR	TRE	TRE	POR	POR	GAL	GAL	FRA	FRA	GER	GER	LAT	LAT	ITA	ITA	WNT	WNT	LOM	LOM	CZE	CZE	FLA	FLA	SWE	SWE	NED	NED	SUI	SUI	TUR	TUR	CHN	CHN	CAS; 12	CAS; Ret	9	41st	19	9th
2025	MXGP	Desmo450 MX	Aruba.it Ducati Factory MX Team	P	91	(Switzerland) Jeremy Seewer	ARG; 6^{+7}	ARG; 18	CAS; 14	CAS; 14	EUR; 13	EUR; 10	SAR; 15	SAR; 9	TRE; 6^{+8}	TRE; 22	SUI; 7^{+5}	SUI; 3	POR; 15^{+2}	POR; 11	SPA; 19^{+5}	SPA; 5	FRA; 5^{+4}	FRA; 3	GER; 5^{+2}	GER; 14	LAT; 16^{+1}	LAT; 18	GBR; 13^{+1}	GBR; 9	FIN; 11^{+1}	FIN; 10	CZE; 8^{+3}	CZE; 6	FLA; 21	FLA; 17	SWE; Ret	SWE; 11	NED; 18	NED; 19	TUR; 14	TUR; 16	CHN; 11	CHN; Ret	AUS; 12	AUS; C	377	10th	490	6th
2025	MXGP	Desmo450 MX	Aruba.it Ducati Factory MX Team	P	101	(Italy) Mattia Guadagnini	ARG; 4^{+4}	ARG; 4	CAS; 21	CAS; 9	EUR; 4	EUR; 7	SAR	SAR	TRE	TRE	SUI	SUI	POR; 9	POR; 10	SPA; 10	SPA; 18	FRA; 19	FRA; Ret	GER; 18	GER; Ret	LAT; 14	LAT; 12	GBR	GBR	FIN; 13	FIN; 12	CZE; 17	CZE; 11	FLA; 20	FLA; Ret	SWE; 10	SWE; 22	NED; 16	NED; 17	TUR; 10	TUR; 20	CHN; 13	CHN; 10	AUS; 7^{+8}	AUS; C	247	17th	490	6th
2025	MXGP	Desmo450 MX	Aruba.it Ducati Factory MX Team	P	222	(Italy) Tony Cairoli	ARG	ARG	CAS	CAS	EUR	EUR	SAR	SAR	TRE; 13	TRE; 19	SUI	SUI	POR	POR	SPA	SPA	FRA	FRA	GER	GER	LAT	LAT	GBR; 7	GBR; 8	FIN	FIN	CZE	CZE	FLA	FLA	SWE	SWE	NED	NED	TUR	TUR	CHN	CHN	AUS	AUS	37	30th	490	6th
2025	MXGP	Desmo450 MX	Aruba.it Ducati Factory MX Team	P	177	(Italy) Alessandro Lupino	ARG	ARG	CAS	CAS	EUR	EUR	SAR	SAR	TRE	TRE	SUI; 19	SUI; 14	POR	POR	SPA	SPA	FRA	FRA	GER	GER	LAT	LAT	GBR	GBR	FIN	FIN	CZE	CZE	FLA	FLA	SWE	SWE	NED	NED	TUR	TUR	CHN	CHN	AUS	AUS	9	36th	490	6th
2026	MXGP	Desmo450 MX	Red Bull Ducati Factory MXGP Team	P	10	(Netherlands) Calvin Vlaanderen	ARG; 8^{+2}	ARG; 12	AND; 18^{+6}	AND; 5	SUI; 10	SUI; 8	SAR; 15	SAR; 10	TRE; 13	TRE; 9	FRA; 11	FRA; 15	GER; Ret	GER; 15	LAT; 10^{+1}	LAT; DNS	ITA; 4	ITA; 10	POR; 10^{+1}	POR; 8	RSA; 8^{+6}	RSA; 4	GBR; 13^{+2}	GBR; Ret	CZE; DNS	CZE; DNS	FLA; DNS	FLA; DNS	SWE; 12	SWE; Ret	NED; 16	NED; 11	TUR; 9^{+4}	TUR; 10	CHN; 6^{+5}	CHN; 4	AUS; 6^{+4}	AUS; 6			368	11th	411	6th
2026	MXGP	Desmo450 MX	Red Bull Ducati Factory MXGP Team	P	91	(Switzerland) Jeremy Seewer	ARG; 17	ARG; 17	AND; 16	AND; 19	SUI; 12	SUI; 16	SAR; 23	SAR; 24	TRE; 21	TRE; Ret	FRA; 21	FRA; 16	GER	GER	LAT	LAT	ITA	ITA	POR	POR	RSA	RSA	GBR	GBR	CZE	CZE	FLA	FLA	SWE	SWE	NED	NED	TUR	TUR	CHN	CHN	AUS	AUS			34 (171)	17th	411	6th
2026	MXGP	Desmo450 MX	Red Bull Ducati Factory MXGP Team	P	132	(Italy) Andrea Bonacorsi	ARG; Ret	ARG; Ret	AND	AND	SUI	SUI	SAR; 25	SAR; 23	TRE; 16^{+1}	TRE; 22	FRA; 10	FRA; 10	GER; Ret^{+2}	GER; 10	LAT; DNS	LAT; DNS	ITA	ITA	POR	POR	RSA	RSA	GBR	GBR	CZE	CZE	FLA; 16^{+2}	FLA; 20	SWE; 20^{+2}	SWE; 8	NED; 13^{+1}	NED; Ret	TUR; 15	TUR; DNS	CHN	CHN	AUS	AUS			80	23rd	411	6th

=== FIM Endurance ===
(key) (Races in bold indicate pole position; races in italics indicate fastest lap)

Year	Team	Bike	Tyre	Co-rider	1	2	3	4	Pos	Pts
2024	(Italy) Ducati Team KAGAYAMA	Ducati Panigale V4	M	(United Kingdom) Josh Waters (Malaysia) Hafizh Syahrin (Japan) Ryo Mizuno	LMS	SPA	SUZ; 4	BDO	16th	23

==== Suzuka 8 Hours results ====
Year	Team	Riders	Bike	Pos
2024	(Italy) Ducati Team KAGAYAMA	(United Kingdom) Josh Waters (Japan) Ryo Mizuno (Malaysia) Hafizh Syahrin	Ducati Panigale V4R	**4th**

== Other honours ==
=== FIM Superstock 1000 Cup ===
Year	Champion	Motorcycle
2007	(Italy) Niccolò Canepa	Ducati 1098S
2008	(Australia) Brendan Roberts	Ducati 1098R
2009	(Belgium) Xavier Siméon	Ducati 1098R
2011	(Italy) Davide Giugliano	Ducati 1098R
2014	(Argentina) Leandro Mercado	Ducati 1199 Panigale R
2017	(Italy) Michael Ruben Rinaldi	Ducati Panigale R

Ducati has also won the manufacturers' championship for years 2008–2009, 2011, and 2016.

=== British Superbike Championship ===
Ducati has won the British Superbike Championship fourteen times.

Year	Champion	Motorcycle
1995	(Scotland) Steve Hislop	Ducati 916
1999	(Australia) Troy Bayliss	Ducati 996
2000	(England) Neil Hodgson	Ducati 996
2001	(England) John Reynolds	Ducati 996 RS
2002	(Scotland) Steve Hislop	Ducati 998 RS
2003	(England) Shane Byrne	Ducati 998 F02
2005	(Spain) Gregorio Lavilla	Ducati 999 F04
2008	(England) Shane Byrne	Ducati 1098
2016	(England) Shane Byrne	Ducati 1199 Panigale
2017	(England) Shane Byrne	Ducati 1199 Panigale
2019	(England) Scott Redding	Ducati Panigale V4
2020	(Australia) Josh Brookes	Ducati Panigale V4
2023	(England) Tommy Bridewell	Ducati Panigale V4
2026	(England) Kyle Ryde	Ducati Panigale V4

=== AMA Superbike Championship ===
In the AMA Superbike Championship, Ducati has had its share of success, with Doug Polen winning the title in 1993, Troy Corser in 1994, and Josh Herrin in 2024.

Year	Champion	Motorcycle
1993	(United States) Doug Polen	Ducati 888
1994	(Australia) Troy Corser	Ducati 888
2024	(United States) Josh Herrin	Ducati Panigale V4R

Ducati had an important place in early Superbike racing history in the United States and vice versa: In 1977, Cycle magazine editors Cook Neilson and Phil Schilling took a Ducati 750SS to first place at Daytona in the second-ever season of AMA Superbike racing.

"Neilson retired from racing at the end of the year, but the bike he and Schilling built — nicknamed Old Blue for its blue livery — became a legend,"

says Richard Backus from Motorcycle Classics:

"How big a legend? Big enough for Ducati to team with Italian specialty builder NCR to craft a limited-edition update, New Blue, based on the 2007 Sport 1000S, and big enough to inspire the crew at the Barber Vintage Motorsports Museum (see Barber Motorsports Park), arguably one of the most important motorcycle museums in the world, to commission Ducati specialist Rich Lambrechts to craft a bolt-by-bolt replica for its collection. The finished bike's name? Deja Blue."

=== Australian Superbike Championship ===
Year	Champion	Motorcycle
1999	(Australia) Steve Martin	Ducati 996RS
2019	(Australia) Mike Jones	Ducati 1299 Panigale R Final Edition
2020	(Australia) Wayne Maxwell	Ducati Panigale V4R
2021	(Australia) Wayne Maxwell	Ducati Panigale V4R
2024	(Australia) Josh Waters	Ducati Panigale V4R
2025	(Australia) Josh Waters	Ducati Panigale V4R
2026	(Australia) Harrison Voight	Ducati Panigale V4R

=== Formula TT ===
Ducati's first ever world title was the 1978 TT Formula 1 World Championship, achieved thanks to Mike Hailwood's victory at the Isle of Man TT.

Between 1981 and 1984 Tony Rutter won four TT Formula 2 World Championships riding Ducati bikes.

Year	Class	Champion	Motorcycle
1978	F1	(United Kingdom) Mike Hailwood	Ducati NCR 900 SS TT1
1981	F2	(United Kingdom) Tony Rutter	Ducati 600 TT2
1982	F2	(United Kingdom) Tony Rutter	Ducati 600 TT2
1983	F2	(United Kingdom) Tony Rutter	Ducati 600 TT2
1984	F2	(United Kingdom) Tony Rutter	Ducati 600 TT2

== As a constructor ==
From 2004 Ducati also support satellite teams in MotoGP, supplying bikes and technical support.

Ducati supplied customer bikes to Pramac Racing, with Mika Kallio and Niccolò Canepa riding for the team in 2009.

In 2015, Ducati fielded a total of 8 bikes on the MotoGP circuit for 2016 between the factory team, Pramac Yakhnich, Aspar Team, and Avintia Racing.

As of 2026, Ducati's MotoGP satellite teams are VR46 Racing Team and Gresini Racing.
