= Cozar =

Cozar may refer to:

- Cozar People the name of a people who inhabited Crișana under the rule of Svatopluk II during the Hungarian conquests around 900AD.
- Cózar a municipality in Ciudad Real, Castile-La Mancha, Spain.
