= Michele Pirro =

Italian motorcycle racer (born 1986)

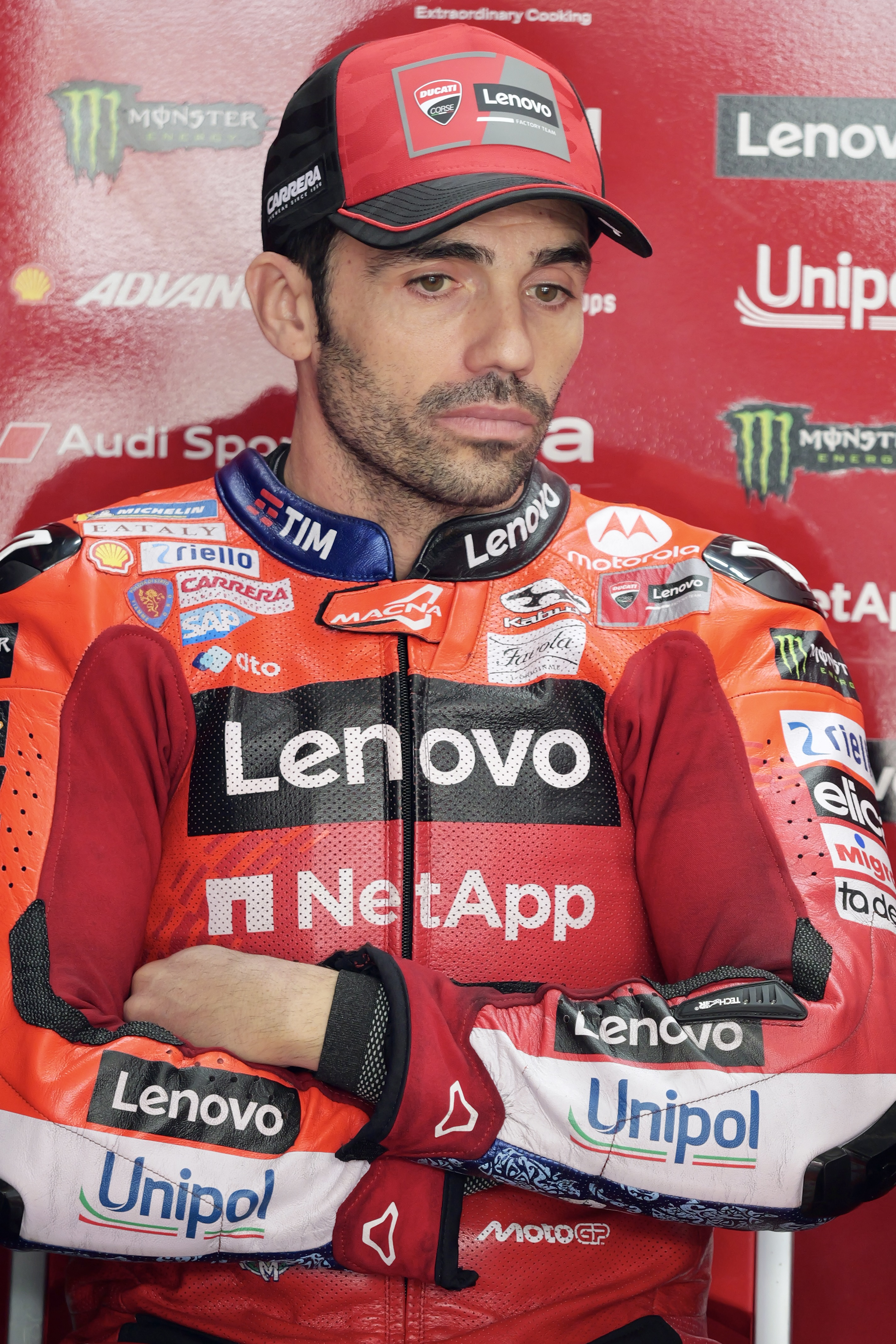
- Pirro at the 2025 Malaysian Grand Prix

Personal information
- Nationality: Italian
- Born: 5 July 1986 (age 40) San Giovanni Rotondo, Italy

Sport
- Club: Fiamme Oro
- Current team: Ducati Lenovo (Test Rider)
- Bike number: 51
Motorcycle racing career statistics
MotoGP World Championship
Active years	2012–2026
Manufacturers	FTR (2012); Ducati (2013– )
Championships	0
2025 championship position	29th (0 pts)
Starts / Wins / Podiums / Poles / F. laps / Points; 73 / 0 / 0 / 0 / 0 / 234
Moto2 World Championship
Active years	2010–2011
Manufacturers	Moriwaki
Championships	0
2011 championship position	9th (84 pts)
Starts / Wins / Podiums / Poles / F. laps / Points; 18 / 1 / 2 / 1 / 0 / 86
125cc World Championship
Active years	2003–2006
Manufacturers	Honda, Aprilia, Malaguti
Championships	0
2006 championship position	NC (0 pts)
Starts / Wins / Podiums / Poles / F. laps / Points; 29 / 0 / 0 / 0 / 0 / 3
Superbike World Championship
Active years	2013, 2015, 2019, 2024
Manufacturers	Ducati
Championships	0
2024 championship position	25th (3 pts)
Starts / Wins / Podiums / Poles / F. laps / Points; 12 / 0 / 0 / 0 / 0 / 58
Supersport World Championship
Active years	2009–2010
Manufacturers	Yamaha, Honda
Championships	0
2010 championship position	5th (99 pts)
Starts / Wins / Podiums / Poles / F. laps / Points; 26 / 1 / 2 / 2 / 1 / 169

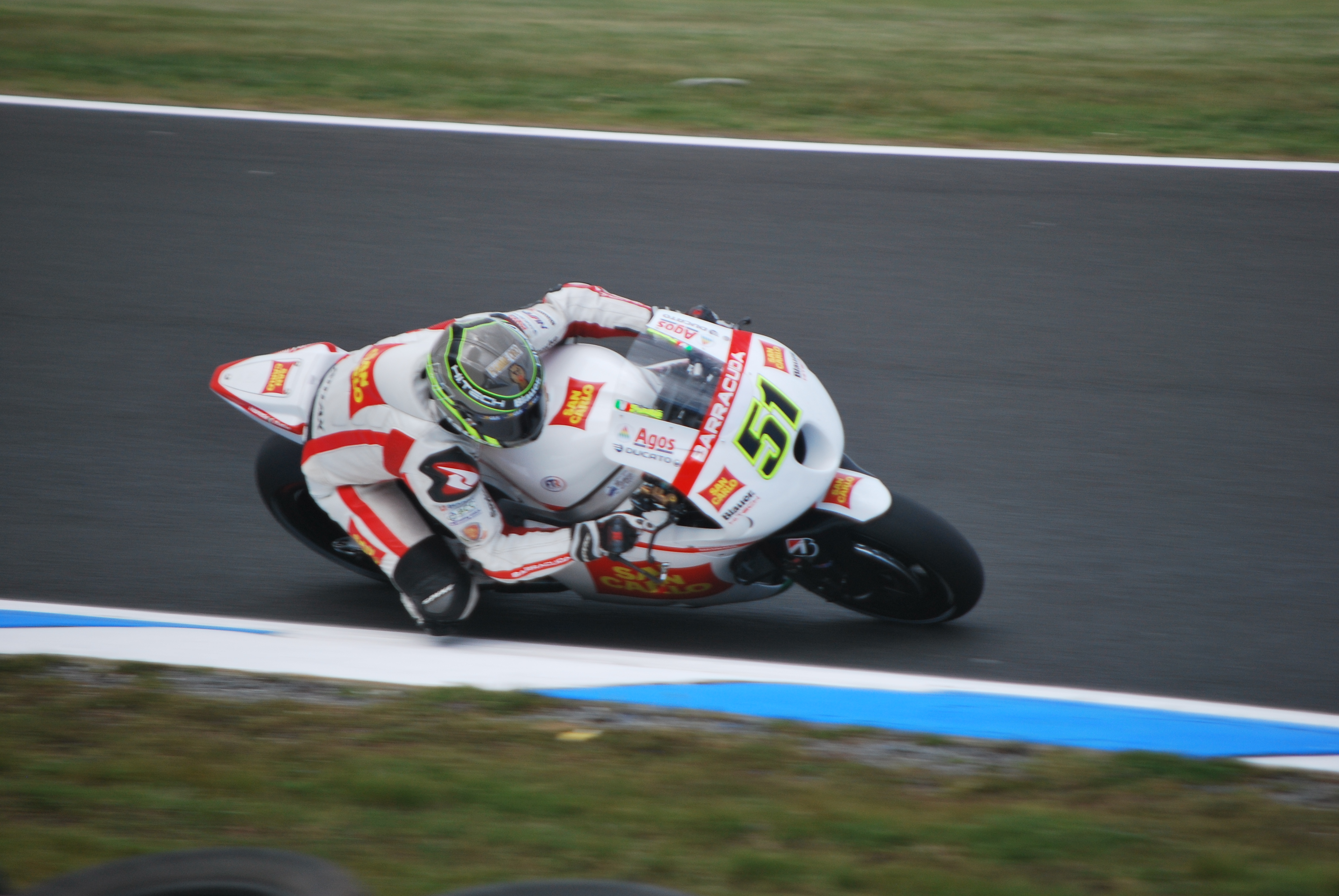
Pirro at the 2012 Australian Grand Prix

Michele Pio Pirro (born 5 July 1986) is a motorcycle road racer from Italy, He was the 2007 and 2008 Italian CIV National Champion in the Superstock class and a test rider for Ducati factory racing in MotoGP and rides occasionally as a wildcard.

Pirro won the 2004 European 125 Championship and won the CIV Superbike Championship ten times: in 2007 and 2008 in the Superstock 1000 class, in 2009 in the Supersport 600 class and in 2015, 2017, 2018, 2019, 2021, 2022 and 2024 in the Superbike class.

Pirro has also competed in Grand Prix motorcycle racing and the Supersport World Championship.

== Career ==
=== 125cc World Championship (2003–2006) ===
Pirro began his Grand Prix career as a wild card in the 2003 Italian Grand Prix in the 125cc class, on an Aprilia motorcycle. After winning the European 125cc Championship in 2004, in 2005 he participated as a full-time rider in the same class with Malaguti, scoring three points in the Chinese Grand Prix and finishing the season in 33rd place. In 2006, he continued to race in the 125 class on an Aprilia – and later a Honda – without scoring points.

=== National racing (2007–2008) ===
In 2007 and 2008, Pirro won the Italian National Championship (CIV) in the Superstock class on a Yamaha YZF-R1.

=== Supersport World Championship (2009–2010) ===
In 2009, Pirro participated in the Supersport World Championship on a Yamaha, ending in 11th place. In the same year, he won the Italian Supersport Championship. The following year, he switched to Honda and finished in fifth place, with a victory in the Italian round at Imola. He also made a one-off appearance in the Moto2 World Championship at the Aragon Grand Prix, finishing 14th.

=== Moto2 and MotoGP World Championship (2011–2012) ===
Pirro returned to Grand Prix racing in 2011 in Moto2 with Team Gresini. He obtained a victory, in the season finale at Valencia, just two weeks after Gresini's MotoGP rider Marco Simoncelli was killed in a crash at the Malaysian Grand Prix.

Pirro's MotoGP career began in 2012 with Gresini on a FTR motorcycle, with a best placement of fifth at the Valencian Grand Prix, ending the season in 15th place with 43 points.

=== Ducati Test Rider (2013–present) ===
Since 2013, Pirro has been the official test rider of team Ducati. He has participated in races every year, either as a wildcard entry or as a substitute for injured riders, obtaining his overall best MotoGP result of fourth at the 2018 Valencian season finale.

During the 2013 season, Pirro participated in ten total races (three as a wildcard and seven as a substitute for the injured Ben Spies), with a best result of seventh at the Italian Grand Prix, ending the season in thirteenth place with 56 points. In 2014, Pirro replaced the injured Cal Crutchlow in the Argentine Grand Prix and participated as a wild-card in five races.

In 2015 and 2016, Pirro continued to be the official Ducati test rider, while also participating in the Italian Superbike Championship (CIV), which he won in 2015. In 2015, he participated as a wild card in the Italian and San Marino MotoGP rounds. He also raced in the Italian round of the Superbike World Championship in Misano as a wild card, and in the Spanish GP as a substitute for the injured Davide Giugliano. In 2016, he substituted the injured Danilo Petrucci for the Pramac Ducati team in Argentina, Texas and Jerez MotoGP races, he participated as a wild card for the Ducati factory team at the Italian GP at Mugello, he replaced the injured Loris Baz at the Catalan GP and the Dutch TT on an Avintia Ducati and he appeared again with the factory team at the Austrian GP as a wild-card entry and at San Marino and Aragon as replacement for the injured Andrea Iannone.

Pirro continued to participate in MotoGP as Ducati's wild card rider in 2017 and 2018. During a practice session for the 2018 Italian Grand Prix he suffered a severe crash at the end of the start/finish straight and was hospitalised with a concussion. He made a further three wildcard entries in Italy, San Marino, and Valencia in 2019. In 2017, 2018 and 2019, he won again the CIV Superbike Championship. In 2020, Pirro substituted the recovering Francesco Bagnaia at Pramac for the two races in Austria (the Austrian Grand Prix and Styrian Grand Prix).

Pirro continued to race in selected rounds of the World Championship in 2021, 2022, 2023 and 2024, either as a wildcard (sometimes entered under the name Aruba.it Racing, Ducati's factory team name from the World Superbike Championship) or as a temporary replacement for an injured factory or satellite Ducati rider.

Pirro replaced reigning World Riders' Champion Marc Márquez at the Australian Grand Prix & Malaysian Grand Prix, after the latter fractured his collarbone in a collision with factory Aprilia rider Marco Bezzecchi in Mandalika before himself being replaced by Ducati World Superbike rider Nicolò Bulega for the final two rounds of the 2025 season.

== Career statistics ==
=== Grand Prix motorcycle racing ===
==== By season ====
Season	Class	Motorcycle	Team	Race	Win	Podium	Pole	FLap	Pts	Plcd
2003	125cc	Aprilia	RCGM	1	0	0	0	0	0	NC
2004	125cc	Aprilia	RCGM Team F.M.I.	1	0	0	0	0	0	NC
2004	125cc	Aprilia	Rauch Bravo	1	0	0	0	0	0	NC
2005	125cc	Malaguti	Malaguti Reparto Corse	14	0	0	0	0	3	33rd
2006	125cc	Aprilia	WTR Blauer USA	10	0	0	0	0	0	NC
2006	125cc	Honda	Humangest Racing Team	2	0	0	0	0	0	NC
2010	Moto2	Moriwaki	Gresini Racing Moto2	1	0	0	0	0	2	38th
2011	Moto2	Moriwaki	Gresini Racing Moto2	17	1	2	1	0	84	9th
2012	MotoGP	FTR	San Carlo Honda Gresini	18	0	0	0	0	43	15th
2013	MotoGP	Ducati	Ducati Team	3	0	0	0	0	20	13th
2013	MotoGP	Ducati	Ignite Pramac Racing	7	0	0	0	0	36	13th
2014	MotoGP	Ducati	Ducati Team	6	0	0	0	0	18	19th
2015	MotoGP	Ducati	Ducati Team	3	0	0	0	0	12	21st
2016	MotoGP	Ducati	OCTO Pramac Yakhnich	3	0	0	0	0	12	19th
2016	MotoGP	Ducati	Ducati Team	4	0	0	0	0	23	19th
2016	MotoGP	Ducati	Avintia Racing	2	0	0	0	0	1	19th
2017	MotoGP	Ducati	Ducati Team	3	0	0	0	0	25	23rd
2018	MotoGP	Ducati	Ducati Team	3	0	0	0	0	14	22nd
2019	MotoGP	Ducati	Ducati Team	3	0	0	0	0	9	22nd
2020	MotoGP	Ducati	Pramac Racing	2	0	0	0	0	4	23rd
2021	MotoGP	Ducati	Pramac Racing	1	0	0	0	0	3	23rd
2021	MotoGP	Ducati	Ducati Lenovo Team	2	0	0	0	0	9	23rd
2022	MotoGP	Ducati	Aruba.it Racing	3	0	0	0	0	0	27th
2023	MotoGP	Ducati	Ducati Lenovo Team	3	0	0	0	0	5	27th
2023	MotoGP	Ducati	Aruba.it Racing	2	0	0	0	0	0	27th
2024	MotoGP	Ducati	Pertamina Enduro VR46 Racing Team	1	0	0	0	0	0	29th
2025	MotoGP	Ducati	Ducati Lenovo Team	2	0	0	0	0	0	29th
2026	MotoGP	Ducati	BK8 Gresini Racing MotoGP	2	0	0	0	0	0	25th*
Total				**120**	**1**	**2**	**1**	**0**	**323**	

==== By class ====
Class	Seasons	1st GP	1st pod	1st win	Race	Win	Podiums	Pole	FLap	Pts	WChmp
125cc	2003–2006	2003 Italy			29	0	0	0	0	3	0
Moto2	2010–2011	2010 Aragon	2011 Great Britain	2011 Valencia	18	1	2	1	0	86	0
MotoGP	2012–present	2012 Qatar			73	0	0	0	0	234	0
Total	2003–2006, 2010–present				**120**	**1**	**2**	**1**	**0**	**323**	**0**

==== Races by year ====
(key) (Races in bold indicate pole position, races in italics indicate fastest lap)

Year	Class	Bike	1	2	3	4	5	6	7	8	9	10	11	12	13	14	15	16	17	18	19	20	21	22	Pos	Pts
2003	125cc	Aprilia	JPN	RSA	SPA	FRA	ITA; 29	CAT	NED	GBR	GER	CZE	POR	BRA	PAC	MAL	AUS	VAL							NC	0
2004	125cc	Aprilia	RSA	SPA	FRA	ITA; 19	CAT	NED	BRA	GER	GBR	CZE	POR	JPN	QAT	MAL	AUS	VAL; 16							NC	0
2005	125cc	Malaguti	SPA; Ret	POR; 19	CHN; 13	FRA; Ret	ITA; 19	CAT; Ret	NED; Ret	GBR; Ret	GER; Ret	CZE; Ret	JPN; Ret	MAL; Ret	QAT; Ret	AUS; Ret	TUR	VAL							33rd	3
2006	125cc	Aprilia	SPA	QAT; 18	TUR; Ret	CHN; 25	FRA; 23	ITA; Ret	CAT; 20	NED; Ret	GBR; Ret	GER; 23	CZE; 19												NC	0
2006	125cc	Honda												MAL; 24	AUS; Ret	JPN	POR	VAL							NC	0
2010	Moto2	Moriwaki	QAT	SPA	FRA	ITA	GBR	NED	CAT	GER	CZE	INP	RSM	ARA; 14	JPN	MAL	AUS	POR	VAL						38th	2
2011	Moto2	Moriwaki	QAT; 8	SPA; 9	POR; 22	FRA; 14	CAT; 12	GBR; 3	NED; 17	ITA; Ret	GER; 10	CZE; 18	INP; 20	RSM; 14	ARA; Ret	JPN; 13	AUS; 14	MAL; 7	**VAL**; 1						9th	84
2012	MotoGP	FTR	QAT; NC	SPA; Ret	POR; 14	FRA; 14	CAT; 14	GBR; 13	NED; 9	GER; Ret	ITA; DSQ	USA; Ret	INP; Ret	CZE; 14	RSM; 10	ARA; 15	JPN; 15	MAL; 12	AUS; 14	VAL; 5					15th	43
2013	MotoGP	Ducati	QAT	AME	SPA; 11	FRA; 8	ITA; 7	CAT; 10	NED; 14	GER; 10	USA	INP	CZE; 12	GBR; 12	RSM; 10	ARA	MAL	AUS	JPN	VAL; 10					13th	56
2014	MotoGP	Ducati	QAT	AME	ARG; 17	SPA; Ret	FRA	ITA; 11	CAT; 14	NED	GER	INP	CZE; 12	GBR	RSM	ARA	JPN	AUS	MAL	VAL; 9					19th	18
2015	MotoGP	Ducati	QAT	AME	ARG	SPA	FRA	ITA; 8	CAT	NED	GER	INP	CZE	GBR	RSM; Ret	ARA	JPN	AUS	MAL	VAL; 12					21st	12
2016	MotoGP	Ducati	QAT	ARG; 12	AME; 8	SPA; 16	FRA	ITA; 10	CAT; 15	NED; Ret	GER	AUT; 12	CZE	GBR	RSM; 7	ARA; 12	JPN	AUS	MAL	VAL					19th	36
2017	MotoGP	Ducati	QAT	ARG	AME	SPA	FRA	ITA; 9	CAT	NED	GER	CZE	AUT	GBR	RSM; 5	ARA	JPN	AUS	MAL	VAL; 9					23rd	25
2018	MotoGP	Ducati	QAT	ARG	AME	SPA	FRA	ITA; DNS	CAT	NED	GER	CZE	AUT	GBR	RSM; 15	ARA	THA	JPN	AUS	MAL; Ret	VAL; 4				22nd	14
2019	MotoGP	Ducati	QAT	ARG	AME	SPA	FRA	ITA; 7	CAT	NED	GER	CZE	AUT	GBR	RSM; Ret	ARA	THA	JPN	AUS	MAL	VAL; Ret				22nd	9
2020	MotoGP	Ducati	SPA	ANC	CZE	AUT; 12	STY; 20	RSM	EMI	CAT	FRA	ARA	TER	EUR	VAL	POR									23rd	4
2021	MotoGP	Ducati	QAT	DOH	POR	SPA	FRA	ITA; 13	CAT	GER	NED	STY	AUT	GBR	ARA	RSM; 11	AME	EMI; 12	ALR	VAL					23rd	12
2022	MotoGP	Ducati	QAT	INA	ARG	AME	POR	SPA	FRA	ITA; 18	CAT; 16	GER	NED	GBR	AUT	RSM; Ret	ARA	JPN	THA	AUS	MAL	VAL			27th	0
2023	MotoGP	Ducati	POR	ARG	AME; 11	SPA	FRA	ITA; 16	GER	NED	GBR	AUT	CAT	RSM; Ret	IND; 16	JPN; 16	INA	AUS	THA	MAL	QAT	VAL			27th	5
2024	MotoGP	Ducati	QAT	POR	AME	SPA	FRA	CAT	ITA	NED	GER	GBR	AUT	ARA	RSM	EMI	INA	JPN	AUS	THA	MAL	SLD; 20			29th	0
2025	MotoGP	Ducati	THA	ARG	AME	QAT	SPA	FRA	GBR	ARA	ITA	NED	GER	CZE	AUT	HUN	CAT	RSM	JPN	INA	AUS; 18	MAL; 17	POR	VAL	29th	0
2026	MotoGP	Ducati	THA; 19	BRA	USA	SPA	FRA	CAT	ITA; 19	HUN	CZE	NED	GER	GBR	ARA	RSM	AUT	JPN	INA	AUS	MAL	QAT	POR	VAL	25th*	0*

=== FIM Superstock 1000 Cup ===
==== Races by year ====
(key) (Races in bold indicate pole position) (Races in italics indicate fastest lap)

Year	Bike	1	2	3	4	5	6	7	8	9	10	11	Pos	Pts
2007	Yamaha	DON; 30	VAL; 2	NED; 1	MNZ; Ret	SIL; 5	SMR; 13	BRN; 5	BRA; 9	LAU; Ret	ITA; 8	MAG; DNS	7th	85
2008	Yamaha	VAL; 6	NED; 2	MNZ; Ret	NŰR; 4	SMR; 2	BRN; 6	BRA; 6	DON; 19	MAG; 10	ALG; 4		5th	102

=== Supersport World Championship ===
==== Races by year ====
(key) (Races in bold indicate pole position; races in italics indicate fastest lap)

Year	Bike	1	2	3	4	5	6	7	8	9	10	11	12	13	14	Pos	Pts
2009	Yamaha	AUS; 12	QAT; 11	SPA; 7	NED; 10	ITA; 7	RSA; 9	USA; 8	**SMR**; Ret	GBR; 15	CZE; Ret	GER; Ret	ITA; 11	FRA; 10	POR; 6	11th	70
2010	Honda	AUS; Ret	POR; 3	SPA; 11	NED; Ret	ITA; 4	RSA; 4	USA; 5	**SMR**; Ret	CZE; Ret	GBR	GER; 8	ITA; 1	FRA; 8		5th	99

=== Superbike World Championship ===
==== Races by year ====
(key) (Races in bold indicate pole position; races in italics indicate fastest lap)

Year	Bike	1		2		3		4		5		6		7		8		9		10		11		12		13		14		Pos	Pts
Year	Bike	R1	R2	R1	R2	R1	R2	R1	R2	R1	R2	R1	R2	R1	R2	R1	R2	R1	R2	R1	R2	R1	R2	R1	R2	R1	R2	R1	R2	Pos	Pts
2013	Ducati	AUS	AUS	SPA	SPA	NED	NED	ITA	ITA	GBR	GBR	POR	POR	ITA	ITA	RUS	RUS	GBR	GBR	GER	GER	TUR	TUR	USA	USA	FRA; 6	FRA; Ret	SPA	SPA	26th	10
2015	Ducati	AUS	AUS	THA	THA	SPA	SPA	NED	NED	ITA	ITA	GBR	GBR	POR	POR	ITA; 8	ITA; 8	USA	USA	MAL	MAL	SPA; 6	SPA; 7	FRA	FRA	QAT	QAT			21st	35

Year	Bike	1			2			3			4			5			6			7			8			9			10			11			12			13			Pos	Pts
Year	Bike	R1	SR	R2	R1	SR	R2	R1	SR	R2	R1	SR	R2	R1	SR	R2	R1	SR	R2	R1	SR	R2	R1	SR	R2	R1	SR	R2	R1	SR	R2	R1	SR	R2	R1	SR	R2	R1	SR	R2	Pos	Pts
2019	Ducati	AUS	AUS	AUS	THA	THA	THA	SPA	SPA	SPA	NED	NED	NED	ITA	ITA	ITA	SPA	SPA	SPA	ITA; Ret	ITA; 8	ITA; 8	GBR	GBR	GBR	USA	USA	USA	POR	POR	POR	FRA	FRA	FRA	ARG	ARG	ARG	QAT	QAT	QAT	24th	10
2024	Ducati	AUS	AUS	AUS	SPA	SPA	SPA	NED	NED	NED	EMI; 13	EMI; 16	EMI; Ret	GBR	GBR	GBR	CZE	CZE	CZE	POR	POR	POR	FRA	FRA	FRA	ITA	ITA	ITA	SPA	SPA	SPA	EST	EST	EST	SPA	SPA	SPA				25th	3
