= Luigi Dall'Igna =

Italian engineer

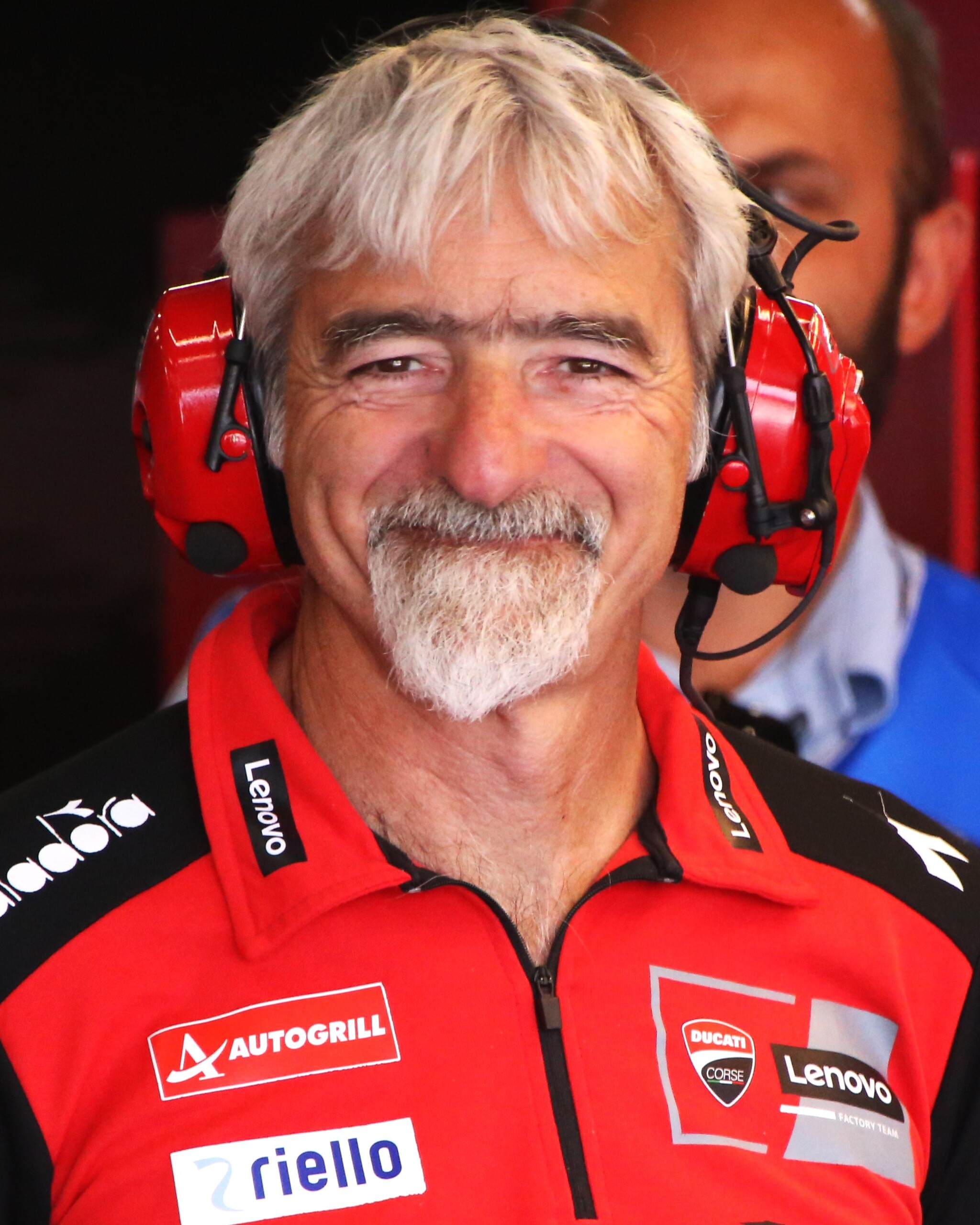
- Dall'Igna in 2025
- Born: 12 July 1966 (age 60); Thiene
- Education: University of Padua (mechanical engineering)
- Engineering career
- Discipline: Mechanical engineering
- Institutions: University of Padua
- Employers: Ducati, Aprilia
- Projects: MotoGP, WorldSBK, carbon monocoque chassis
- Significant design: MotoGP wing aerodynamics, active ride height control

Luigi "Gigi" Dall'Igna (born 12 July 1966 in Thiene) is an Italian mechanical engineer. He is the general manager of Ducati Corse, a racing division of Italian motorcycle brand Ducati. Dall'Igna was previously technical director of Aprilia racing department, part of Piaggio Group. He is known for inventing active ride height control, wings, and leading technological development in modern MotoGP era.

== Personal life ==
Dall'Igna was born in Thiene, 75 km (47 mi) west of Venice, Italy. A big fan of Galileo, he completed his degree in mechanical engineering at Padua University in 1991, where Galileo studied in the 16th century.

== Career ==
=== Aprilia (1992-2013) ===
After earning a college degree, Dall'Igna started to work in the car industry in a company that dealt with sports prototypes; while there, he wrote his thesis on carbon monocoque chassis. As the sport program of that company came to an end, and wanting to stay at least two more years in racing, he moved to the Aprilia in Noale, Italy.

=== Ducati (2013-present) ===
Dall'Igna, considered a mastermind who changed modern MotoGP, joined Ducati at the end 2013 season on 11 November 2013.

==== 2014 ====
After his time with Aprilia, the work of Dall'Igna in SBK and MotoGP with ART didn't go unnoticed. Ducati decided to hire Dall'Igna from the end of 2013 to develop a successor model for Ducati. However he decided not to overhaul the GP14 as it takes time to overhaul.

==== 2015 ====
The first real radical changes came in 2015, with a bike that has nothing common to previous version. The engine was completely redesigned, positioned differently in the frame, which helped to address the lack of speed mid-corner. From mid-season onward the "wings", fin shaped aerodynamic parts, were added to the nose of GP15, which would in future change the modern MotoGP evolution.

==== 2016 ====
With the win at Red Bull Ring in 2016, that suited the GP16 characteristics and then at Sepang in Malaysia, it was enough for Dall'Igna to secure two more years contract with Ducati. This improvement was enough for Jorge Lorenzo, then five times world champion, to sign with Ducati for 2017.

==== 2017 ====
The new technical regulations in 2017, which limited the aerodynamics, didn't dampened Dall'Igna. Then appears infamous Hammerhead shark-shaped nose on the windshield debuting in Brno and Salad Box beneath the tail unit of GP17, a mysterious black box, which many believed to be a mass damper, and inertia damper which oscillates to balance front and rear axles through its weight.

==== 2018 ====
Aerodynamics development continued in 2018, but it was in the chassis which Dall'Igna found something to solve the age old Ducati problem, mid-corner speed. Andrea Dovizioso confirmed the progress, the GP18 was clearly the best bike on grid but it was Marc Márquez who eluded Ducati.

==== 2019 ====
When in 2019 people thought aerodynamics had reached its peak, Dall'Igna shocked everyone by introducing wings on rear end of the bike, seemingly to increase the rear grip of bike.
