= 2016 Aragon motorcycle Grand Prix =

2016 Aragon Grand Prix
Race details
- Race 14 of 18 races in the 2016 Grand Prix motorcycle racing season
- Date: 25 September 2016
- Official name: Gran Premio Movistar de Aragón
- Location: MotorLand Aragón
- Course: Permanent racing facility; 5.078 km (3.155 mi)

MotoGP
Pole position
| Rider | (Spain) Marc Márquez | Honda |
| Time | 1:47.117 | |
Fastest lap
| Rider | (Spain) Marc Márquez | Honda |
| Time | 1:48.694 on lap 15 | |
Podium
| First | (Spain) Marc Márquez | Honda |
| Second | (Spain) Jorge Lorenzo | Yamaha |
| Third | (Italy) Valentino Rossi | Yamaha |

Moto2
Pole position
| Rider | (United Kingdom) Sam Lowes | Kalex |
| Time | 1:53.207 | |
Fastest lap
| Rider | (Italy) Franco Morbidelli | Kalex |
| Time | 1:53.672 on lap 4 | |
Podium
| First | (United Kingdom) Sam Lowes | Kalex |
| Second | (Spain) Álex Márquez | Kalex |
| Third | (Italy) Franco Morbidelli | Kalex |

Moto3
Pole position
| Rider | (Italy) Enea Bastianini | Honda |
| Time | 1:58.293 | |
Fastest lap
| Rider | (Spain) Juan Francisco Guevara | KTM |
| Time | 1:58.858 on lap 5 | |
Podium
| First | (Spain) Jorge Navarro | Honda |
| Second | (South Africa) Brad Binder | KTM |
| Third | (Italy) Enea Bastianini | Honda |

The 2016 Aragon motorcycle Grand Prix was the fourteenth round of the 2016 MotoGP season. It was held at the MotorLand Aragón in Alcañiz on 25 September 2016.

== Classification ==
=== MotoGP ===
Andrea Iannone was replaced by Michele Pirro after the first practice session. Jack Miller, who had withdrawn from Misano, was kept out of this round. Nicky Hayden rode for Marc VDS in Miller's place.

| Pos. | No. | Rider | Team | Manufacturer | Laps | Time/Retired | Grid | Points |
|---|---|---|---|---|---|---|---|---|
| 1 | 93 | (Spain) Marc Márquez | Repsol Honda Team | Honda | 23 | 41:57.678 | 1 | 25 |
| 2 | 99 | (Spain) Jorge Lorenzo | Movistar Yamaha MotoGP | Yamaha | 23 | +2.740 | 3 | 20 |
| 3 | 46 | (Italy) Valentino Rossi | Movistar Yamaha MotoGP | Yamaha | 23 | +5.983 | 6 | 16 |
| 4 | 25 | (Spain) Maverick Viñales | Team Suzuki Ecstar | Suzuki | 23 | +8.238 | 2 | 13 |
| 5 | 35 | (United Kingdom) Cal Crutchlow | LCR Honda | Honda | 23 | +13.221 | 5 | 11 |
| 6 | 26 | (Spain) Dani Pedrosa | Repsol Honda Team | Honda | 23 | +17.072 | 7 | 10 |
| 7 | 41 | (Spain) Aleix Espargaró | Team Suzuki Ecstar | Suzuki | 23 | +18.522 | 8 | 9 |
| 8 | 44 | (Spain) Pol Espargaró | Monster Yamaha Tech 3 | Yamaha | 23 | +19.432 | 11 | 8 |
| 9 | 19 | (Spain) Álvaro Bautista | Aprilia Racing Team Gresini | Aprilia | 23 | +23.071 | 14 | 7 |
| 10 | 6 | (Germany) Stefan Bradl | Aprilia Racing Team Gresini | Aprilia | 23 | +27.898 | 12 | 6 |
| 11 | 4 | (Italy) Andrea Dovizioso | Ducati Team | Ducati | 23 | +32.448 | 4 | 5 |
| 12 | 51 | (Italy) Michele Pirro | Ducati Team | Ducati | 23 | +35.033 | 17 | 4 |
| 13 | 8 | (Spain) Héctor Barberá | Avintia Racing | Ducati | 23 | +36.224 | 13 | 3 |
| 14 | 50 | (Republic of Ireland) Eugene Laverty | Pull & Bear Aspar Team | Ducati | 23 | +37.621 | 16 | 2 |
| 15 | 69 | (United States) Nicky Hayden | Estrella Galicia 0,0 Marc VDS | Honda | 23 | +40.509 | 19 | 1 |
| 16 | 68 | (Colombia) Yonny Hernández | Pull & Bear Aspar Team | Ducati | 23 | +43.906 | 15 | |
| 17 | 9 | (Italy) Danilo Petrucci | Octo Pramac Yakhnich | Ducati | 23 | +56.740 | 9 | |
| 18 | 76 | (France) Loris Baz | Avintia Racing | Ducati | 23 | +59.681 | 20 | |
| 19 | 45 | (United Kingdom) Scott Redding | Octo Pramac Yakhnich | Ducati | 23 | +1:34.126 | 10 | |
| Ret | 53 | (Spain) Tito Rabat | Estrella Galicia 0,0 Marc VDS | Honda | 16 | Accident | 18 | |
| DNS | 22 | (United Kingdom) Alex Lowes | Monster Yamaha Tech 3 | Yamaha | | Did not start | | |
Sources:

- Alex Lowes was declared unfit to start the race due to a foot injury suffered in a crash during Saturday free practice.

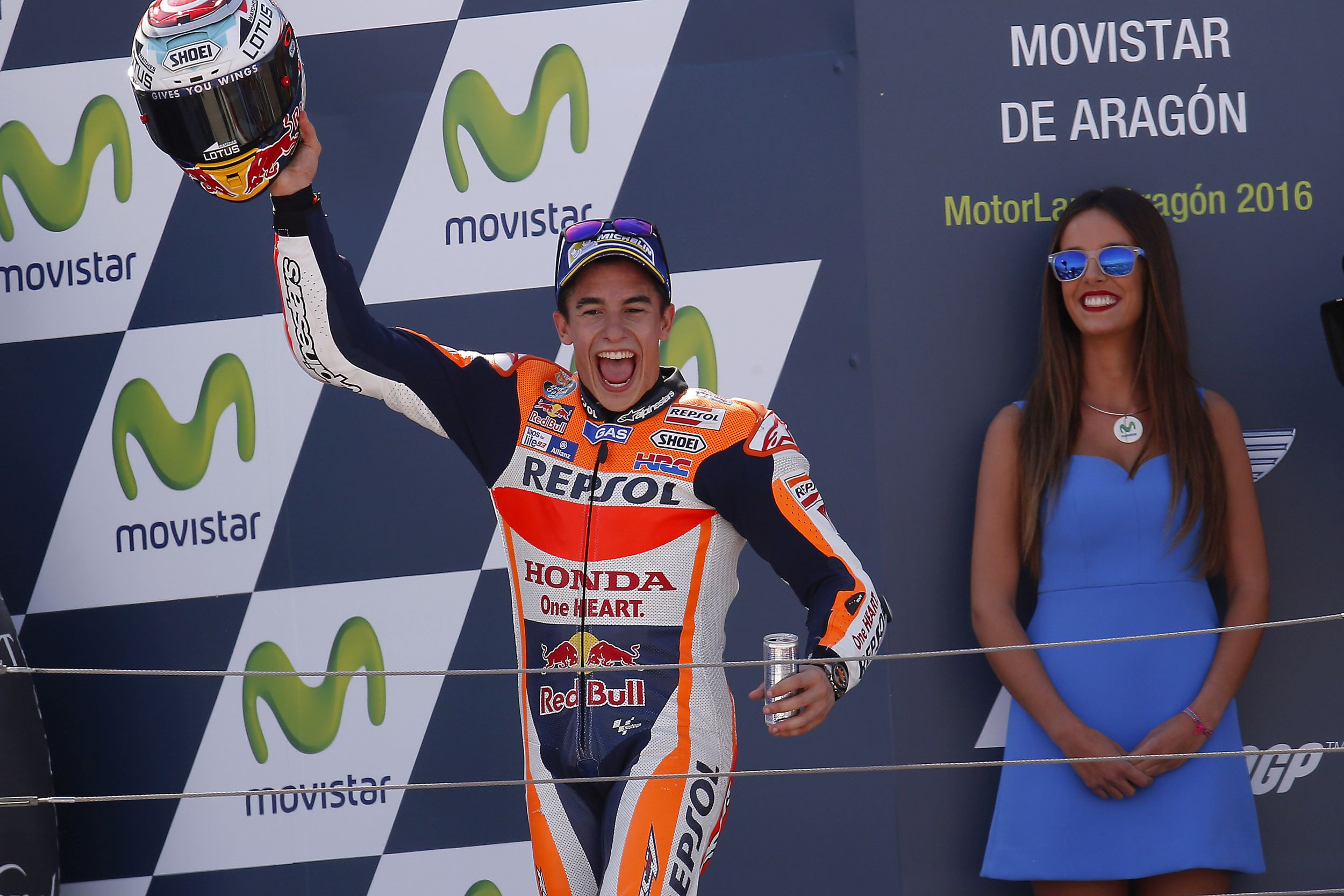
Marc Márquez, celebrating on the podium after winning the MotoGP race.

=== Moto2 ===
| Pos. | No. | Rider | Manufacturer | Laps | Time/Retired | Grid | Points |
|---|---|---|---|---|---|---|---|
| 1 | 22 | (United Kingdom) Sam Lowes | Kalex | 21 | 40:00.885 | 1 | 25 |
| 2 | 73 | (Spain) Álex Márquez | Kalex | 21 | +3.289 | 2 | 20 |
| 3 | 21 | (Italy) Franco Morbidelli | Kalex | 21 | +3.321 | 8 | 16 |
| 4 | 12 | (Switzerland) Thomas Lüthi | Kalex | 21 | +5.181 | 7 | 13 |
| 5 | 30 | (Japan) Takaaki Nakagami | Kalex | 21 | +10.722 | 3 | 11 |
| 6 | 40 | (Spain) Álex Rins | Kalex | 21 | +12.164 | 13 | 10 |
| 7 | 7 | (Italy) Lorenzo Baldassarri | Kalex | 21 | +12.385 | 6 | 9 |
| 8 | 5 | (France) Johann Zarco | Kalex | 21 | +12.612 | 5 | 8 |
| 9 | 24 | (Italy) Simone Corsi | Speed Up | 21 | +14.004 | 11 | 7 |
| 10 | 94 | (Germany) Jonas Folger | Kalex | 21 | +18.164 | 4 | 6 |
| 11 | 19 | (Belgium) Xavier Siméon | Speed Up | 21 | +22.413 | 17 | 5 |
| 12 | 54 | (Italy) Mattia Pasini | Kalex | 21 | +22.671 | 10 | 4 |
| 13 | 11 | (Germany) Sandro Cortese | Kalex | 21 | +22.909 | 14 | 3 |
| 14 | 55 | (Malaysia) Hafizh Syahrin | Kalex | 21 | +23.437 | 12 | 2 |
| 15 | 23 | (Germany) Marcel Schrötter | Kalex | 21 | +25.293 | 16 | 1 |
| 16 | 49 | (Spain) Axel Pons | Kalex | 21 | +25.828 | 9 | |
| 17 | 97 | (Spain) Xavi Vierge | Tech 3 | 21 | +26.404 | 20 | |
| 18 | 4 | (South Africa) Steven Odendaal | Kalex | 21 | +26.525 | 18 | |
| 19 | 87 | (Australia) Remy Gardner | Kalex | 21 | +30.341 | 25 | |
| 20 | 2 | (Switzerland) Jesko Raffin | Kalex | 21 | +30.438 | 22 | |
| 21 | 60 | (Spain) Julián Simón | Speed Up | 21 | +30.505 | 15 | |
| 22 | 77 | (Switzerland) Dominique Aegerter | Kalex | 21 | +41.767 | 19 | |
| 23 | 45 | (Japan) Tetsuta Nagashima | Kalex | 21 | +42.019 | 21 | |
| 24 | 57 | (Spain) Edgar Pons | Kalex | 21 | +42.058 | 23 | |
| 25 | 10 | (Italy) Luca Marini | Kalex | 21 | +45.444 | 27 | |
| 26 | 14 | (Thailand) Ratthapark Wilairot | Kalex | 21 | +45.629 | 29 | |
| 27 | 70 | (Switzerland) Robin Mulhauser | Kalex | 21 | +55.886 | 24 | |
| 28 | 32 | (Spain) Isaac Viñales | Tech 3 | 21 | +55.889 | 30 | |
| 29 | 52 | (United Kingdom) Danny Kent | Kalex | 20 | +1 lap | 28 | |
| Ret | 89 | (France) Alan Techer | NTS | 7 | Accident | 26 | |
| WD | 44 | (Portugal) Miguel Oliveira | Kalex | | Withdrew | | |
OFFICIAL MOTO2 REPORT

- Miguel Oliveira suffered a broken collarbone after being hit by Franco Morbidelli during Friday free practice.

=== Moto3 ===
| Pos. | No. | Rider | Manufacturer | Laps | Time/Retired | Grid | Points |
|---|---|---|---|---|---|---|---|
| 1 | 9 | (Spain) Jorge Navarro | Honda | 20 | 39:56.973 | 2 | 25 |
| 2 | 41 | (South Africa) Brad Binder | KTM | 20 | +0.030 | 5 | 20 |
| 3 | 33 | (Italy) Enea Bastianini | Honda | 20 | +0.107 | 1 | 16 |
| 4 | 4 | (Italy) Fabio Di Giannantonio | Honda | 20 | +0.162 | 12 | 13 |
| 5 | 36 | (Spain) Joan Mir | KTM | 20 | +1.724 | 24 | 11 |
| 6 | 88 | (Spain) Jorge Martín | Mahindra | 20 | +1.903 | 10 | 10 |
| 7 | 44 | (Spain) Arón Canet | Honda | 20 | +1.979 | 3 | 9 |
| 8 | 19 | (Argentina) Gabriel Rodrigo | KTM | 20 | +3.008 | 7 | 8 |
| 9 | 58 | (Spain) Juan Francisco Guevara | KTM | 20 | +3.101 | 14 | 7 |
| 10 | 65 | (Germany) Philipp Öttl | KTM | 20 | +3.559 | 4 | 6 |
| 11 | 16 | (Italy) Andrea Migno | KTM | 20 | +3.594 | 13 | 5 |
| 12 | 20 | (France) Fabio Quartararo | KTM | 20 | +6.883 | 6 | 4 |
| 13 | 17 | (United Kingdom) John McPhee | Peugeot | 20 | +9.742 | 16 | 3 |
| 14 | 23 | (Italy) Niccolò Antonelli | Honda | 20 | +9.758 | 22 | 2 |
| 15 | 64 | (Netherlands) Bo Bendsneyder | KTM | 20 | +9.776 | 9 | 1 |
| 16 | 21 | (Italy) Francesco Bagnaia | Mahindra | 20 | +9.931 | 19 | |
| 17 | 55 | (Italy) Andrea Locatelli | KTM | 20 | +13.358 | 15 | |
| 18 | 11 | (Belgium) Livio Loi | Honda | 20 | +13.645 | 34 | |
| 19 | 95 | (France) Jules Danilo | Honda | 20 | +18.776 | 18 | |
| 20 | 76 | (Japan) Hiroki Ono | Honda | 20 | +22.193 | 8 | |
| 21 | 24 | (Japan) Tatsuki Suzuki | Mahindra | 20 | +22.800 | 23 | |
| 22 | 89 | (Malaysia) Khairul Idham Pawi | Honda | 20 | +30.459 | 27 | |
| 23 | 7 | (Malaysia) Adam Norrodin | Honda | 20 | +30.749 | 26 | |
| 24 | 12 | (Spain) Albert Arenas | Peugeot | 20 | +36.510 | 20 | |
| 25 | 48 | (Italy) Lorenzo Dalla Porta | KTM | 20 | +43.028 | 11 | |
| 26 | 40 | (South Africa) Darryn Binder | Mahindra | 20 | +43.441 | 25 | |
| 27 | 42 | (Spain) Marcos Ramírez | Mahindra | 20 | +43.478 | 31 | |
| 28 | 6 | (Spain) María Herrera | KTM | 20 | +1:10.624 | 21 | |
| 29 | 77 | (Italy) Lorenzo Petrarca | Mahindra | 20 | +1:14.198 | 30 | |
| 30 | 18 | (Mexico) Gabriel Martínez-Ábrego | Mahindra | 20 | +1:45.935 | 32 | |
| Ret | 43 | (Italy) Stefano Valtulini | Mahindra | 9 | Hand Pain | 29 | |
| Ret | 8 | (Italy) Nicolò Bulega | KTM | 0 | Accident | 17 | |
| Ret | 84 | (Czech Republic) Jakub Kornfeil | Honda | 0 | Accident | 28 | |
| Ret | 3 | (Italy) Fabio Spiranelli | Mahindra | 0 | Accident | 33 | |
OFFICIAL MOTO3 REPORT

== Championship standings after the race (MotoGP) ==
Below are the standings for the top five riders and constructors after round fourteen has concluded.

Riders' Championship standings

| Pos. | Rider | Points |
|---|---|---|
| 1 | (Spain) Marc Marquez | 248 |
| 2 | (Italy) Valentino Rossi | 196 |
| 3 | (Spain) Jorge Lorenzo | 182 |
| 4 | (Spain) Dani Pedrosa | 155 |
| 5 | (Spain) Maverick Vinales | 149 |

Constructors' Championship standings

| Pos. | Constructor | Points |
|---|---|---|
| 1 | (Japan) Honda | 291 |
| 2 | (Japan) Yamaha | 278 |
| 3 | (Italy) Ducati | 187 |
| 4 | (Japan) Suzuki | 155 |
| 5 | (Italy) Aprilia | 72 |

- Note: Only the top five positions are included for both sets of standings.

| Previous race: 2016 San Marino Grand Prix | FIM Grand Prix World Championship; 2016 season | Next race: 2016 Japanese Grand Prix |
| Previous race: 2015 Aragon Grand Prix | Aragon motorcycle Grand Prix | Next race: 2017 Aragon Grand Prix |
