= Cózar =

Municipality in Castile-La Mancha, Spain

Coordinates: 38°39′N 3°04′W

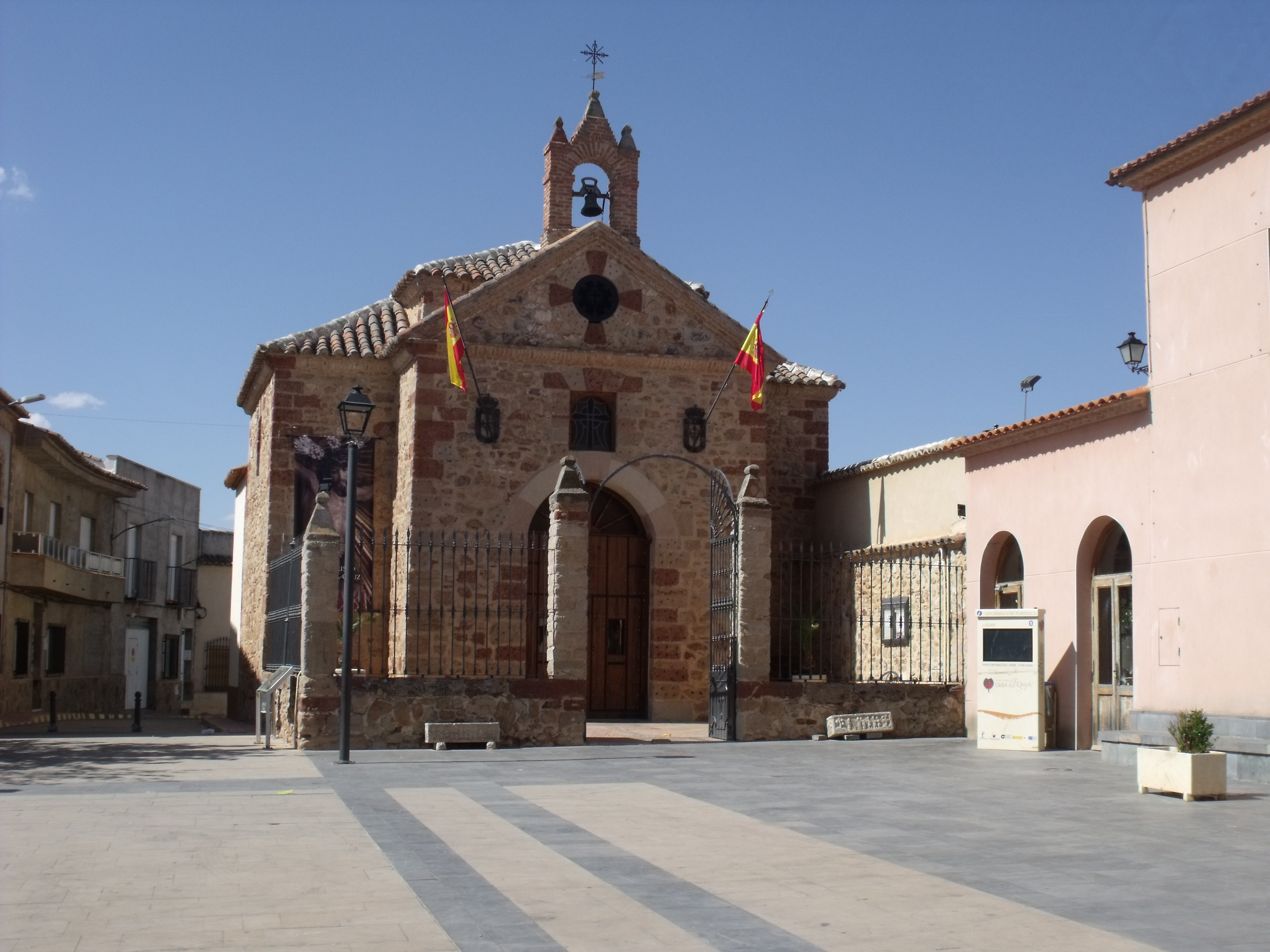

Coat of arms of Cózar

Cózar is a municipality in Ciudad Real, Castile-La Mancha, Spain. It has a population of 1,260.
