= 2024 Aragon motorcycle Grand Prix =

Motorcycle races in Alcañiz

2024 Aragon Grand Prix
Race details
- Race 12 of 20 races in the 2024 Grand Prix motorcycle racing season
- Date: 1 September 2024
- Official name: Gran Premio GoPro de Aragón
- Location: MotorLand Aragón; Alcañiz, Spain
- Course: Permanent racing facility; 5.077 km (3.155 mi)

MotoGP
Pole position
Rider	(Spain) Marc Márquez	Ducati
Time	1:46.766	
Fastest lap
Rider	(Spain) Marc Márquez	Ducati
Time	1:48.186 on lap 9	
Podium
First	(Spain) Marc Márquez	Ducati
Second	(Spain) Jorge Martín	Ducati
Third	(Spain) Pedro Acosta	KTM

Moto2
Pole position
Rider	(United Kingdom) Jake Dixon	Kalex
Time	1:51.636	
Fastest lap
Rider	(United Kingdom) Jake Dixon	Kalex
Time	1:52.597 on lap 16	
Podium
First	(United Kingdom) Jake Dixon	Kalex
Second	(Italy) Tony Arbolino	Kalex
Third	(Turkey) Deniz Öncü	Kalex

Moto3
Pole position
Rider	(Colombia) David Alonso	CFMoto
Time	1:58.059	
Fastest lap
Rider	(Spain) José Antonio Rueda	KTM
Time	2:01.193 on lap 10	
Podium
First	(Spain) José Antonio Rueda	KTM
Second	(Netherlands) Collin Veijer	Husqvarna
Third	(Italy) Luca Lunetta	Honda

The 2024 Aragon motorcycle Grand Prix (officially known as the Gran Premio GoPro de Aragón) was the twelfth round of the 2024 Grand Prix motorcycle racing season. It was held at the MotorLand Aragón in Alcañiz on 1 September 2024. Marc Márquez took the race wins in both Sprint and Feature race in MotoGP, his first full race win since the Emilia Romagna GP in 2021 and his first win for Ducati.

== MotoGP Sprint ==
The MotoGP Sprint was held on 31 August.

Pos.	No.	Rider	Team	Constructor	Laps	Time/Retired	Grid	Points
1	93	(Spain) Marc Márquez	Gresini Racing MotoGP	Ducati	11	19:50.034	1	12
2	89	(Spain) Jorge Martín	Prima Pramac Racing	Ducati	11	+2.961	4	9
3	31	(Spain) Pedro Acosta	Red Bull GasGas Tech3	KTM	11	+6.694	2	7
4	73	(Spain) Álex Márquez	Gresini Racing MotoGP	Ducati	11	+9.950	5	6
5	88	(Portugal) Miguel Oliveira	Trackhouse Racing	Aprilia	11	+11.749	8	5
6	33	(South Africa) Brad Binder	Red Bull KTM Factory Racing	KTM	11	+14.144	7	4
7	23	(Italy) Enea Bastianini	Ducati Lenovo Team	Ducati	11	+14.291	14	3
8	20	(France) Fabio Quartararo	Monster Energy Yamaha MotoGP Team	Yamaha	11	+18.836	17	2
9	1	(Italy) Francesco Bagnaia	Ducati Lenovo Team	Ducati	11	+20.298	3	1
10	72	(Italy) Marco Bezzecchi	Pertamina Enduro VR46 Racing Team	Ducati	11	+20.448	13	
11	25	(Spain) Raúl Fernández	Trackhouse Racing	Aprilia	11	+20.678	9	
12	37	(Spain) Augusto Fernández	Red Bull GasGas Tech3	KTM	11	+21.429	19	
13	43	(Australia) Jack Miller	Red Bull KTM Factory Racing	KTM	11	+22.110	15	
14	30	(Japan) Takaaki Nakagami	Idemitsu Honda LCR	Honda	11	+22.440	18	
15	49	(Italy) Fabio Di Giannantonio	Pertamina Enduro VR46 Racing Team	Ducati	11	+23.468	16	
16	10	(Italy) Luca Marini	Repsol Honda Team	Honda	11	+26.822	20	
17	42	(Spain) Álex Rins	Monster Energy Yamaha MotoGP Team	Yamaha	11	+26.910	21	
18	36	(Spain) Joan Mir	Repsol Honda Team	Honda	11	+31.147	22	
19	12	(Spain) Maverick Viñales	Aprilia Racing	Aprilia	11	+37.642	12	
Ret	21	(Italy) Franco Morbidelli	Prima Pramac Racing	Ducati	4	Retired	6	
Ret	5	(France) Johann Zarco	Castrol Honda LCR	Honda	1	Retired	10	
Ret	41	(Spain) Aleix Espargaró	Aprilia Racing	Aprilia	0	Retired	11	
Fastest lap: (Spain) Marc Márquez (Ducati) – 1:47.284 (lap 3)
OFFICIAL MOTOGP SPRINT REPORT

== Race ==
=== MotoGP ===
Pos.	No.	Rider	Team	Constructor	Laps	Time/Retired	Grid	Points
1	93	(Spain) Marc Márquez	Gresini Racing MotoGP	Ducati	23	41:47.082	1	25
2	89	(Spain) Jorge Martín	Prima Pramac Racing	Ducati	23	+4.789	4	20
3	31	(Spain) Pedro Acosta	Red Bull GasGas Tech3	KTM	23	+14.904	2	16
4	33	(South Africa) Brad Binder	Red Bull KTM Factory Racing	KTM	23	+16.459	7	13
5	23	(Italy) Enea Bastianini	Ducati Lenovo Team	Ducati	23	+18.776	14	11
6	21	(Italy) Franco Morbidelli	Prima Pramac Racing	Ducati	23	+20.549	6	10
7	72	(Italy) Marco Bezzecchi	Pertamina Enduro VR46 Racing Team	Ducati	23	+24.759	13	9
8	49	(Italy) Fabio Di Giannantonio	Pertamina Enduro VR46 Racing Team	Ducati	23	+37.159 (Note: 16-second penalty for tyre pressure regulations infringement.)	16	8
9	42	(Spain) Álex Rins	Monster Energy Yamaha MotoGP Team	Yamaha	23	+39.420	21	7
10	41	(Spain) Aleix Espargaró	Aprilia Racing	Aprilia	23	+40.602	11	6
11	30	(Japan) Takaaki Nakagami	Idemitsu Honda LCR	Honda	23	+41.782	18	5
12	37	(Spain) Augusto Fernández	Red Bull GasGas Tech3	KTM	23	+42.083	19	4
13	5	(France) Johann Zarco	Castrol Honda LCR	Honda	23	+43.264	10	3
14	36	(Spain) Joan Mir	Repsol Honda Team	Honda	23	+49.735	22	2
15	43	(Australia) Jack Miller	Red Bull KTM Factory Racing	KTM	23	+55.966	15	1
16	25	(Spain) Raúl Fernández	Trackhouse Racing	Aprilia	23	+1:13.322	9	
17	10	(Italy) Luca Marini	Repsol Honda Team	Honda	23	+1:52.386	PL	
Ret	73	(Spain) Álex Márquez	Gresini Racing MotoGP	Ducati	17	Collision	5	
Ret	1	(Italy) Francesco Bagnaia	Ducati Lenovo Team	Ducati	17	Collision	3	
Ret	12	(Spain) Maverick Viñales	Aprilia Racing	Aprilia	10	Retired in pits	12	
Ret	20	(France) Fabio Quartararo	Monster Energy Yamaha MotoGP Team	Yamaha	5	Accident	17	
Ret	88	(Portugal) Miguel Oliveira	Trackhouse Racing	Aprilia	0	Accident	8	
Fastest lap: (Spain) Marc Márquez (Ducati) – 1:48.186 (lap 9)
OFFICIAL MOTOGP RACE REPORT

== Championship standings after the race ==
Below are the standings for the top five riders, constructors, and teams after the round.

=== MotoGP ===
Riders' Championship standings

	Pos.	Rider	Points
1	1	(Spain) Jorge Martín	299
1	2	(Italy) Francesco Bagnaia	276
1	3	(Spain) Marc Márquez	229
1	4	(Italy) Enea Bastianini	228
2	5	(Spain) Pedro Acosta	148

Constructors' Championship standings

Pos.	Constructor	Points
1	(Italy) Ducati	426
2	(Italy) Aprilia	219
3	(Austria) KTM	217
4	(Japan) Yamaha	62
5	(Japan) Honda	33

Teams' Championship standings

Pos.	Team	Points
1	(Italy) Ducati Lenovo Team	504
2	(Italy) Prima Pramac Racing	382
3	(Italy) Gresini Racing MotoGP	333
4	(Italy) Aprilia Racing	258
5	(Italy) Pertamina Enduro VR46 Racing Team	194

=== Moto2 ===
Riders' Championship standings

	Pos.	Rider	Points
	1	(Spain) Sergio García	162
	2	(Japan) Ai Ogura	150
1	3	(Spain) Alonso López	133
1	4	(United States) Joe Roberts	130
2	5	(United Kingdom) Jake Dixon	119

Constructors' Championship standings

Pos.	Constructor	Points
1	(Italy) Boscoscuro	250
2	(Germany) Kalex	247
3	(Switzerland) Forward	6

Teams' Championship standings

Pos.	Team	Points
1	(Spain) MT Helmets – MSi	312
2	(Italy) Sync Speed Up	245
3	(United States) OnlyFans American Racing Team	194
4	(Italy) QJmotor Gresini Moto2	158
5	(Spain) CFMoto Inde Aspar Team	144

=== Moto3 ===
Riders' Championship standings

	Pos.	Rider	Points
	1	(Colombia) David Alonso	237
2	2	(Netherlands) Collin Veijer	162
1	3	(Spain) Iván Ortolá	157
1	4	(Spain) Daniel Holgado	156
	5	(Spain) David Muñoz	117

Constructors' Championship standings

Pos.	Constructor	Points
1	(China) CFMoto	237
2	(Austria) KTM	224
3	(Sweden) Husqvarna	179
4	(Spain) Gas Gas	161
5	(Japan) Honda	147

Teams' Championship standings

	Pos.	Team	Points
	1	(Spain) CFMoto Gaviota Aspar Team	279
	2	(Spain) MT Helmets – MSi	242
1	3	(Germany) Liqui Moly Husqvarna Intact GP	212
1	4	(France) Red Bull GasGas Tech3	202
	5	(Spain) Boé Motorsports	200

== Notes ==
Previous race: 2024 Austrian Grand Prix	FIM Grand Prix World Championship; 2024 season	Next race: 2024 San Marino Grand Prix
Previous race: 2022 Aragon Grand Prix	Aragon motorcycle Grand Prix	Next race: 2025 Aragon Grand Prix
