= 2024 MotoGP World Championship =

76th running of the MotoGP World Championship

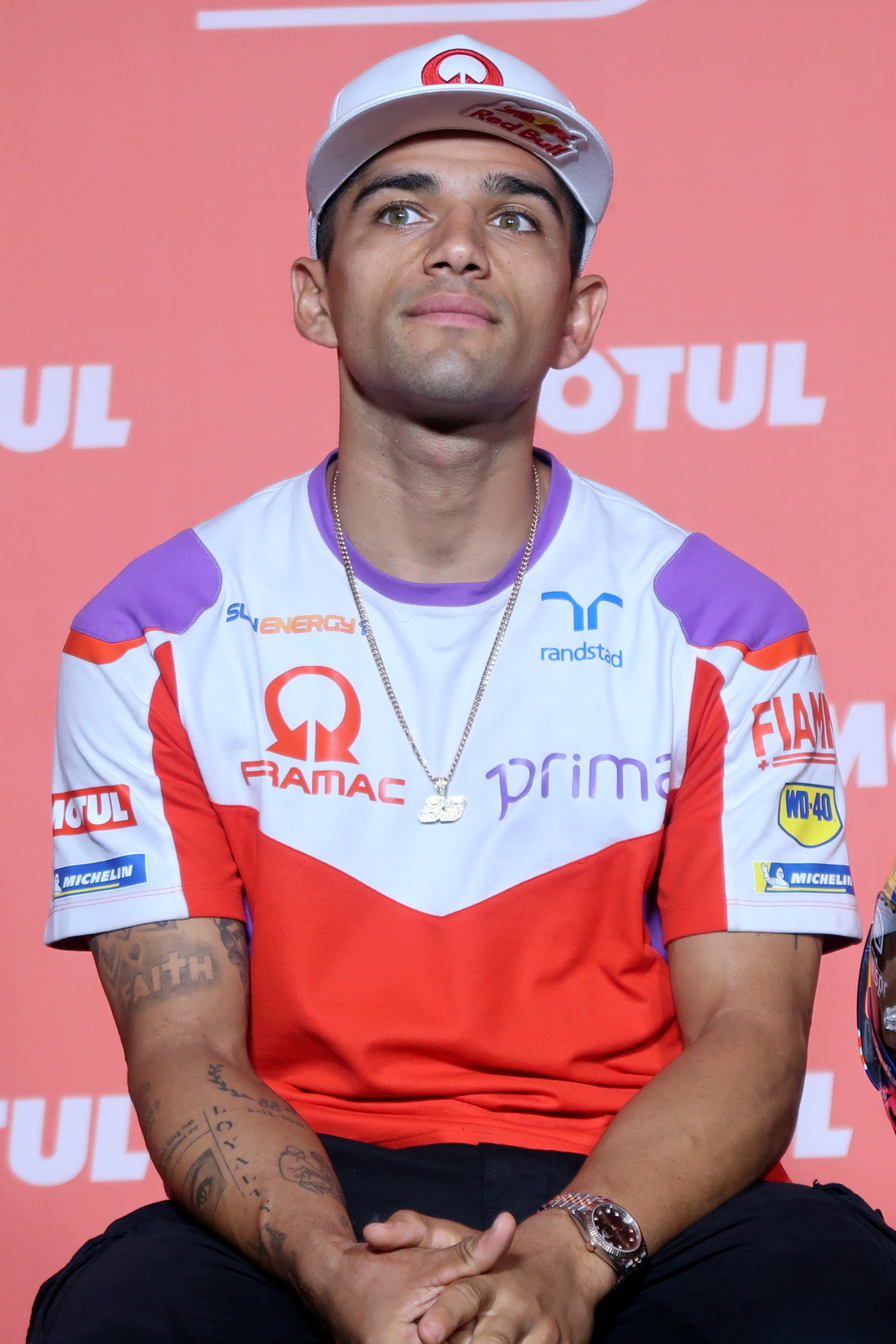
Jorge Martín (pictured in 2023) was the 2024 MotoGP World Riders' Champion.

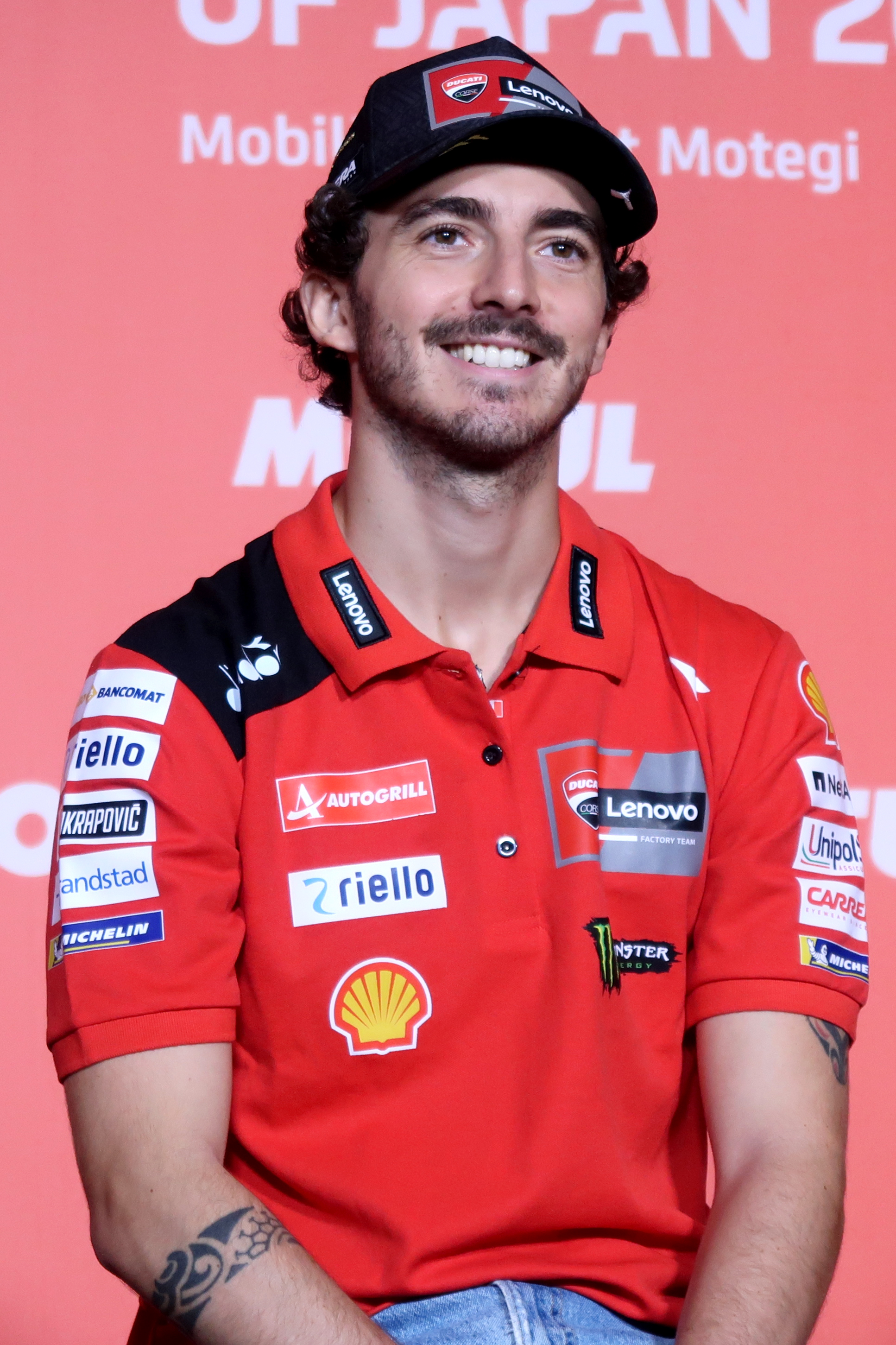
Defending champion Francesco Bagnaia (pictured in 2023) finished runner-up.

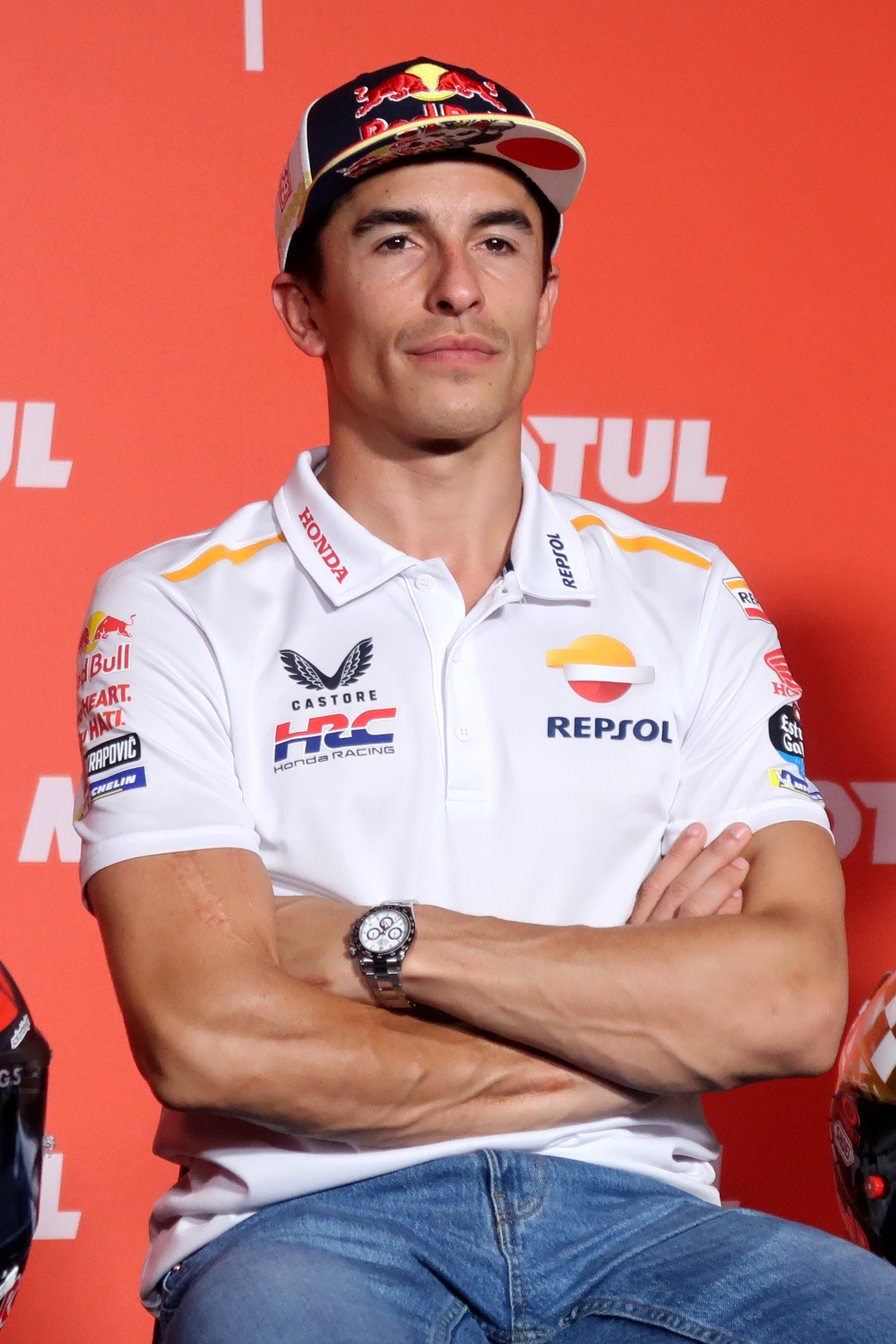
Marc Márquez (pictured riding for Honda in 2023) finished third in his first year with Ducati machinery.

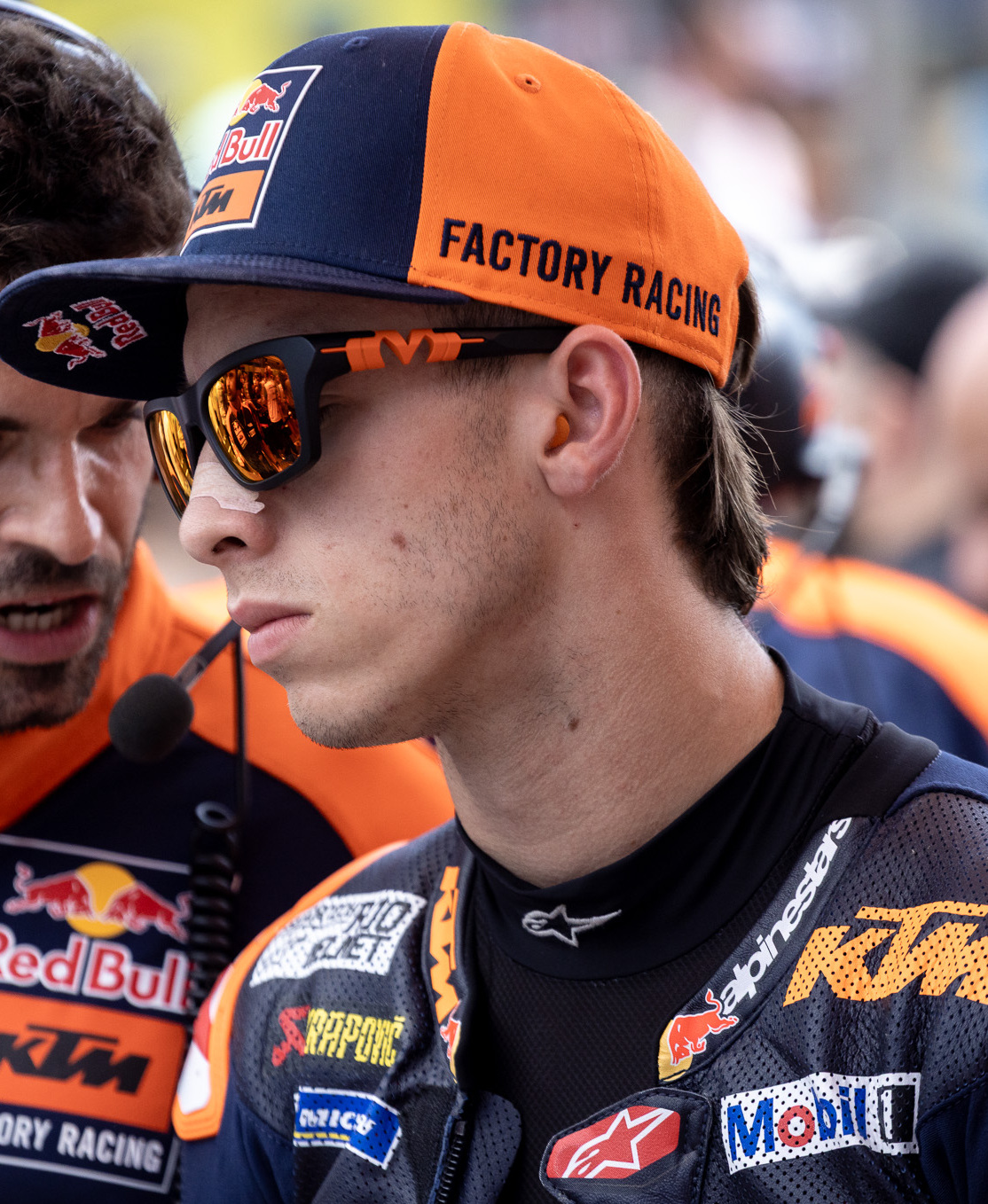
Pedro Acosta (pictured in 2025), the 2024 MotoGP Rookie of the Year.

The 2024 FIM MotoGP World Championship was the premier class of the 76th Fédération Internationale de Motocyclisme (FIM) Road Racing World Championship season, the highest level of competition in motorcycle road racing.

Spanish rider Jorge Martín with Prima Pramac Racing was crowned Riders' World Champion, the first independent team rider to do so in the MotoGP era and first since Valentino Rossi with Nastro Azzurro Honda in 2001. With 17 sprint and 19 Grand Prix victories from 20 racing weekends, Ducati dominated the season to take their sixth Constructors' World Championship, with the factory team taking the Teams' World Championship. This season also saw Japanese manufacturers struggling for the entire season as they failed to score a single race win for the first time since 1970.

== Season summary ==
The season opener returned to its traditional home in Qatar, seeing Jorge Martín take the early championship lead with a sprint race win from pole position, before being eclipsed by defending champion Francesco Bagnaia taking the main race victory. In Portugal, Martín re-took the championship lead with a sprint podium and race win. Pedro Acosta became the youngest rider to achieve a podium in the MotoGP era (and third-youngest in the history of Grand Prix motorcycle racing) with a third place at 19 years 304 days. In Austin, Maverick Viñales and Aprilia completed a perfect weekend, taking pole position with a new lap record, the sprint and race victories, and fastest lap. With this win, Viñales became the first rider in the MotoGP era (and fifth overall in Grand Prix motorcycle racing history) to secure victories with three different manufacturers (Suzuki, Yamaha, and Aprilia).

In Jerez, Jorge Martín took his second sprint victory of the season, in a race session notable for 15 separate incidents of riders crashing due to weather conditions creating unpredictable damp patches on an otherwise dry race course. Francesco Bagnaia took the main race win, ahead of Marc Márquez and Marco Bezzecchi. In Le Mans, Martín achieved a perfect weekend to extend his championship lead, winning both the sprint and main races from pole position. Marquéz continued his streak of second place podium finishes in both races and moved into third in the championship. Bagnaia struggled in the sprint before retiring on the third lap, but managed to take the final podium position in the main race. In Montmeló for the first of two rounds, Aprilia rider Aleix Espargaró announced his plans to retire at the conclusion of the 2024 season at a special Friday press conference, before achieving pole position and the sprint race victory on Saturday. Bagnaia took the main race win, with Martín and Márquez completing the podium. At Mugello, Martín started from pole, but Bagnaia took the sprint and grand prix victories (despite a three-place grid penalty) to cut the championship deficit to 18 points. In Assen, Bagnaia completed a perfect weekend, taking pole position and both race wins, with Martín finishing runner-up in all sessions. Martín initially dominated the weekend in Sachensring, getting pole position and winning the sprint before crashing from the lead on the penultimate lap of the main race, ultimately gifting the win to Bagnaia. With this victory, Bagnaia re-took the championship lead for the first time since Portugal to enter the summer break with a 10 point advantage over Martín.

Returning to action at the British Grand Prix in Silverstone, the 75th anniversary of the world championship was celebrated with special retro-inspired liveries for all teams in the Grand Prix race. Ducati rider Enea Bastianini took the win in both the sprint and Grand Prix races. Jorge Martín finished both races in second position, while Francesco Bagnaia crashed out of the sprint and finished third in the main race, allowing Martín to re-take the championship lead. Bagnaia took both race wins ahead of Martín in Spielberg to reclaim the lead. At Aragon, Marc Márquez completed a perfect weekend with pole position, sprint win, race win and fastest lap to mark his first victory with Ducati and his first wins in 1,043 days since 2021 Emilia Romagna Grand Prix. Martín took second place in both racing sessions to again leapfrog Bagnaia for the championship lead. Márquez took a consecutive Grand Prix victory in the first of two Misano rounds, while Martín topped the sprint podium. The cancelled Kazakhstan Grand Prix was replaced by a second Misano round in consecutive weeks, which saw Bagnaia win the sprint but crash out of the main Grand Prix won by teammate Bastianini. Martín finished on the second step of both sessions to extend his championship lead to 24 points to end the European leg of the season. Ducati clinched their fifth consecutive Constructors' Championship (and sixth overall) with six rounds remaining.

The Pacific leg of the calendar began in Indonesia, which saw the first Grand Prix victory for Jorge Martín since France in May, and a sprint win for Francesco Bagnaia. At Motegi, Bagnaia took the top step of the podium in both racing sessions to cut Martín's championship lead to 10 points with four rounds remaining. Martín took pole position and the sprint victory at Philip Island, but finished second behind Marc Marquéz in the Grand Prix. In Thailand, Enea Bastianini won the sprint ahead of Martín and Bagnaia, while Bagnaia won the main race ahead of Martín and Pedro Acosta. At the penultimate round in Sepang, Bagnaia started from pole but crashed out of the sprint while chasing Martín, who had taken the lead into the first corner. The two title contenders swapped the lead multiple times in the opening laps of the main race, before Bagnaia built a gap to take the win ahead of Martín. This set up a final race show-down with a 24 point advantage to Martín for the final Grand Prix weekend.

Flooding in the Valencian region caused the final round, normally held in Cheste in Valencia, to be replaced by a second round held in Montmeló in Catalonia at the Circuit de Barcelona-Catalunya. Francesco Bagnaia completed a perfect weekend in Barcelona, winning both the sprint and Grand Prix from pole position, but two third places for Jorge Martín were sufficient to crown Martín as the 2024 champion, with 508 points to Bagnaia's 498. Ducati completed the season with 722 points out of a possible maximum of 740 (97.6%) to win the constructor's championship.

== Teams and riders ==
Team	Constructor	Motorcycle	No.	Rider	Rounds
(Italy) Aprilia Racing	Aprilia	RS-GP24	12	(Spain) Maverick Viñales	All
(Italy) Aprilia Racing	Aprilia	RS-GP24	41	(Spain) Aleix Espargaró	All
(Italy) Aprilia Racing	Aprilia	RS-GP24	32	(Italy) Lorenzo Savadori	4, 7–8, 11
(United States) Trackhouse Racing	Aprilia	RS-GP24	88	(Portugal) Miguel Oliveira	1–15, 20
(United States) Trackhouse Racing	Aprilia	RS-GP24	32	(Italy) Lorenzo Savadori	16–19
(United States) Trackhouse Racing	Aprilia	RS-GP23	25	(Spain) Raúl Fernández	All
(Italy) Ducati Lenovo Team	Ducati	Desmosedici GP24	1	(Italy) Francesco Bagnaia	All
(Italy) Ducati Lenovo Team	Ducati	Desmosedici GP24	23	(Italy) Enea Bastianini	All
(Italy) Prima Pramac Racing	Ducati	Desmosedici GP24	21	(Italy) Franco Morbidelli	All
(Italy) Prima Pramac Racing	Ducati	Desmosedici GP24	89	(Spain) Jorge Martín	All
(Italy) Gresini Racing MotoGP	Ducati	Desmosedici GP23	73	(Spain) Álex Márquez	All
(Italy) Gresini Racing MotoGP	Ducati	Desmosedici GP23	93	(Spain) Marc Márquez	All
(Italy) Pertamina Enduro VR46 Racing Team	Ducati	Desmosedici GP23	49	(Italy) Fabio Di Giannantonio	1–18
(Italy) Pertamina Enduro VR46 Racing Team	Ducati	Desmosedici GP23	29	(Italy) Andrea Iannone	19
(Italy) Pertamina Enduro VR46 Racing Team	Ducati	Desmosedici GP23	51	(Italy) Michele Pirro	20
(Italy) Pertamina Enduro VR46 Racing Team	Ducati	Desmosedici GP23	72	(Italy) Marco Bezzecchi	All
(Monaco) Castrol Honda LCR (Monaco) Idemitsu Honda LCR	Honda	RC213V	5	(France) Johann Zarco	All
(Monaco) Castrol Honda LCR (Monaco) Idemitsu Honda LCR	Honda	RC213V	30	(Japan) Takaaki Nakagami	All
(Japan) Repsol Honda Team	Honda	RC213V	10	(Italy) Luca Marini	All
(Japan) Repsol Honda Team	Honda	RC213V	36	(Spain) Joan Mir	All
(Japan) HRC Test Team	Honda	RC213V	6	(Germany) Stefan Bradl	4, 6, 9, 11, 13, 20
(France) Red Bull GasGas Tech3	KTM	RC16	31	(Spain) Pedro Acosta	All
(France) Red Bull GasGas Tech3	KTM	RC16	37	(Spain) Augusto Fernández	All
(Austria) Red Bull KTM Factory Racing	KTM	RC16	33	(South Africa) Brad Binder	All
(Austria) Red Bull KTM Factory Racing	KTM	RC16	43	(Australia) Jack Miller	All
(Austria) Red Bull KTM Factory Racing	KTM	RC16	26	(Spain) Dani Pedrosa	4
(Austria) Red Bull KTM Factory Racing	KTM	RC16	44	(Spain) Pol Espargaró	7, 11, 13
(Japan) Monster Energy Yamaha MotoGP Team (Note: Wildcard Remy Gardner used the team name Yamaha Factory Racing Team during round 16.)	Yamaha	YZR-M1	20	(France) Fabio Quartararo	All
(Japan) Monster Energy Yamaha MotoGP Team	Yamaha	YZR-M1	42	(Spain) Álex Rins	1–8, 10–20
(Japan) Monster Energy Yamaha MotoGP Team	Yamaha	YZR-M1	87	(Australia) Remy Gardner	9
(Japan) Monster Energy Yamaha MotoGP Team	Yamaha	YZR-M1	87	(Australia) Remy Gardner	10, 16

Key
Regular rider
Replacement rider
Wildcard rider

All teams used series-specified Michelin tyres.

=== Team changes ===
- RNF Racing did not enter the 2024 season after being found breaching the participation agreement. Trackhouse Racing was later announced as the replacement for RNF, taking over as Aprilia's independent team and retaining riders Miguel Oliveira and Raúl Fernández from RNF.

=== Rider changes ===
- Álex Rins moved to Monster Energy Yamaha MotoGP Team from LCR Honda, replacing Franco Morbidelli who moved to Prima Pramac Racing, replacing Johann Zarco.
- Johann Zarco moved to LCR Honda from Prima Pramac Racing, replacing Álex Rins. Zarco previously raced with the team as a replacement rider in 2019.
- Marc Márquez moved to Gresini Racing from Repsol Honda Team, replacing Fabio Di Giannantonio who moved to VR46 Racing Team, replacing Luca Marini. Márquez left Repsol Honda after 11 seasons, winning six Riders' Championships during his stint with the team, and teamed up again with his brother Álex, who was his teammate in Repsol Honda in 2020.
- Pedro Acosta entered the MotoGP class with the Red Bull GasGas Tech3 team, replacing Pol Espargaró, who left the premier class after 10 seasons.
- Luca Marini moved to Repsol Honda Team from VR46 Racing Team, replacing Marc Márquez.

==== Mid-season changes ====
- Álex Rins missed the German round after an injury sustained at the previous Dutch round and was replaced by Remy Gardner. Rins also missed the British round for the same reason, but he was not replaced.
- Yamaha planned to have Cal Crutchlow wildcarding at the Italian, British, and San Marino Grands Prix. Crutchlow had surgery on his right hand and withdrew from Italy and was replaced by Remy Gardner for Britain as Crutchlow was still recovering from the surgery but no wildcard entry was provided for San Marino.
- Miguel Oliveira missed the Japanese, Australian, Thailand, and Malaysian rounds after a wrist injury sustained at the Indonesian round. He was replaced for all races by Lorenzo Savadori.
- Fabio Di Giannantonio missed the final two races of the season to undergo surgery on his left shoulder. He was replaced by Andrea Iannone for the Malaysian round and Michele Pirro for the Solidarity round.

== Rule changes ==
A new concession system for manufacturers has been introduced, classifying them based on their recent performance across two evaluation periods. The system encompasses multiple factors, such as test days, riders, wildcard entries, engines, aerodynamic updates, and allocated testing tyres.

During the warm-up lap of a sprint or race, the white flag may be displayed by race direction, indicating that bike changes are permitted due to rain. Riders can enter the pit lane to change tyres or bikes and start the race from the pit lane without incurring additional penalties.

== Calendar ==
The following Grands Prix took place in 2024:

Round	Date	Grand Prix	Circuit
1	10 March	Qatar Airways Grand Prix of Qatar	Lusail International Circuit, Lusail
2	24 March	Grande Prémio Tissot de Portugal	Algarve International Circuit, Portimão
3	14 April	(United States) Red Bull Grand Prix of the Americas	Circuit of the Americas, Austin
4	28 April	(Spain) Gran Premio Estrella Galicia 0,0 de España	Circuito de Jerez, Jerez de la Frontera
5	12 May	Michelin Grand Prix de France	Bugatti Circuit, Le Mans
6	26 May	(Catalonia) Gran Premi Monster Energy de Catalunya	Circuit de Barcelona-Catalunya, Montmeló
7	2 June	(Italy) Gran Premio d'Italia Brembo	Mugello Circuit, Scarperia e San Piero
8	30 June	(Netherlands) Motul TT Assen	TT Circuit Assen, Assen
9	7 July	(Germany) Liqui Moly Motorrad Grand Prix Deutschland	Sachsenring, Hohenstein-Ernstthal
10	4 August	(United Kingdom) Monster Energy British Grand Prix	Silverstone Circuit, Silverstone
11	18 August	(Austria) Motorrad Grand Prix von Österreich	Red Bull Ring, Spielberg
12	1 September	(Aragon) Gran Premio GoPro de Aragón	MotorLand Aragón, Alcañiz
13	8 September	Gran Premio Red Bull di San Marino e della Riviera di Rimini	Misano World Circuit, Misano Adriatico
14	22 September	Gran Premio Pramac dell'Emilia-Romagna	Misano World Circuit, Misano Adriatico
15	29 September	Pertamina Grand Prix of Indonesia	Mandalika International Street Circuit, Mandalika
16	6 October	Motul Grand Prix of Japan	Motegi Circuit, Motegi
17	20 October	(Australia) Qatar Airways Australian Motorcycle Grand Prix	Phillip Island Grand Prix Circuit, Phillip Island
18	27 October	PT Grand Prix of Thailand	Buriram International Circuit, Buriram
19	3 November	Petronas Grand Prix of Malaysia	Sepang International Circuit, Sepang
20	17 November	Motul Solidarity Grand Prix of Barcelona	Circuit de Barcelona-Catalunya, Montmeló
Cancelled Grands Prix
–	~~7 April~~	(Argentina) Argentine Republic motorcycle Grand Prix	Autódromo Termas de Río Hondo, Termas de Río Hondo
–	~~16 June~~; ~~22 September~~	Kazakhstan motorcycle Grand Prix	Sokol International Racetrack, Almaty
–	~~22 September~~	(India) Indian motorcycle Grand Prix	Buddh International Circuit, Greater Noida
–	~~17 November~~	Valencian Community motorcycle Grand Prix	Circuit Ricardo Tormo, Valencia

=== Grand Prix locations ===
Location of non-European Grands Prix in 2024.
(scheduled Grand Prix: cancelled Grand Prix)
Location of European Grands Prix in 2024.
(scheduled Grand Prix: cancelled Grand Prix)

=== Calendar changes ===
- The Qatar Grand Prix returned as the season opener after being the penultimate round in 2023.
- The Kazakhstan Grand Prix is set to make its debut this season after its cancellation in 2023 due to homologation works at the circuit along with global operational challenges. With the introduction of this Grand Prix, the German Grand Prix was returned to its traditional calendar slot in early July, after the Dutch TT and before the season's summer break.
- The Aragon Grand Prix returned this season after not being held in 2023.
- The Argentine Grand Prix was cancelled on 31 January, due to "current circumstances" in the country's on-going economic crisis. The event was not replaced.
- The Kazakhstan Grand Prix was "postponed until later in the season" on 3 May, due to the on-going Central Asian flooding. It was announced on 29 May that it will be held on 22 September, the date which the Indian Grand Prix is scheduled to be held. It was also announced on the same day the Grand Prix of India will not be held in 2024 and will be postponed to March 2025. On 15 July, it was announced that the Kazakhstan Grand Prix would not take place due to construction was not completed, and its date would be replaced by a second round at Misano.
- The Valencian Grand Prix which was initially scheduled to be held as the season finale on 17 November was cancelled due to the October 2024 Spanish floods. On 5 November, it was announced that a second Grand Prix at Barcelona would host the season finale, with the Grand Prix name being the Solidarity Grand Prix.

== Results and standings ==
=== Grands Prix ===
Round	Grand Prix	Pole position	Fastest lap	Winning rider	Winning team	Winning constructor	Report
1	Qatar motorcycle Grand Prix	(Spain) Jorge Martín	(Spain) Pedro Acosta	(Italy) Francesco Bagnaia	(Italy) Ducati Lenovo Team	(Italy) Ducati	Report
2	(Portugal) Portuguese motorcycle Grand Prix	(Italy) Enea Bastianini	(Italy) Enea Bastianini	(Spain) Jorge Martín	(Italy) Prima Pramac Racing	(Italy) Ducati	Report
3	(United States) Motorcycle Grand Prix of the Americas	(Spain) Maverick Viñales	(Spain) Maverick Viñales	(Spain) Maverick Viñales	(Italy) Aprilia Racing	(Italy) Aprilia	Report
4	(Spain) Spanish motorcycle Grand Prix	(Spain) Marc Márquez	(Italy) Francesco Bagnaia	(Italy) Francesco Bagnaia	(Italy) Ducati Lenovo Team	(Italy) Ducati	Report
5	(France) French motorcycle Grand Prix	(Spain) Jorge Martín	(Italy) Enea Bastianini	(Spain) Jorge Martín	(Italy) Prima Pramac Racing	(Italy) Ducati	Report
6	(Catalonia) Catalan motorcycle Grand Prix	(Spain) Aleix Espargaró	(Spain) Pedro Acosta	(Italy) Francesco Bagnaia	(Italy) Ducati Lenovo Team	(Italy) Ducati	Report
7	(Italy) Italian motorcycle Grand Prix	(Spain) Jorge Martín	(Italy) Francesco Bagnaia	(Italy) Francesco Bagnaia	(Italy) Ducati Lenovo Team	(Italy) Ducati	Report
8	(Netherlands) Dutch TT	(Italy) Francesco Bagnaia	(Italy) Francesco Bagnaia	(Italy) Francesco Bagnaia	(Italy) Ducati Lenovo Team	(Italy) Ducati	Report
9	(Germany) German motorcycle Grand Prix	(Spain) Jorge Martín	(Spain) Jorge Martín	(Italy) Francesco Bagnaia	(Italy) Ducati Lenovo Team	(Italy) Ducati	Report
10	(United Kingdom) British motorcycle Grand Prix	(Spain) Aleix Espargaró	(Spain) Aleix Espargaró	(Italy) Enea Bastianini	(Italy) Ducati Lenovo Team	(Italy) Ducati	Report
11	(Austria) Austrian motorcycle Grand Prix	(Spain) Jorge Martín	(Italy) Francesco Bagnaia	(Italy) Francesco Bagnaia	(Italy) Ducati Lenovo Team	(Italy) Ducati	Report
12	Aragon motorcycle Grand Prix	(Spain) Marc Márquez	(Spain) Marc Márquez	(Spain) Marc Márquez	(Italy) Gresini Racing MotoGP	(Italy) Ducati	Report
13	San Marino and Rimini Riviera motorcycle Grand Prix	(Italy) Francesco Bagnaia	(Spain) Marc Márquez	(Spain) Marc Márquez	(Italy) Gresini Racing MotoGP	(Italy) Ducati	Report
14	(Emilia-Romagna) Emilia Romagna motorcycle Grand Prix	(Italy) Francesco Bagnaia	(Italy) Francesco Bagnaia	(Italy) Enea Bastianini	(Italy) Ducati Lenovo Team	(Italy) Ducati	Report
15	(Indonesia) Indonesian motorcycle Grand Prix	(Spain) Jorge Martín	(Italy) Enea Bastianini	(Spain) Jorge Martín	(Italy) Prima Pramac Racing	(Italy) Ducati	Report
16	(Japan) Japanese motorcycle Grand Prix	(Spain) Pedro Acosta	(Spain) Jorge Martín	(Italy) Francesco Bagnaia	(Italy) Ducati Lenovo Team	(Italy) Ducati	Report
17	(Australia) Australian motorcycle Grand Prix	(Spain) Jorge Martín	(Spain) Marc Márquez	(Spain) Marc Márquez	(Italy) Gresini Racing MotoGP	(Italy) Ducati	Report
18	Thailand motorcycle Grand Prix	(Italy) Francesco Bagnaia	(Italy) Fabio Di Giannantonio	(Italy) Francesco Bagnaia	(Italy) Ducati Lenovo Team	(Italy) Ducati	Report
19	(Malaysia) Malaysian motorcycle Grand Prix	(Italy) Francesco Bagnaia	(Italy) Francesco Bagnaia	(Italy) Francesco Bagnaia	(Italy) Ducati Lenovo Team	(Italy) Ducati	Report
20	Solidarity motorcycle Grand Prix	(Italy) Francesco Bagnaia	(Spain) Marc Márquez	(Italy) Francesco Bagnaia	(Italy) Ducati Lenovo Team	(Italy) Ducati	Report

=== Riders' standings ===
Scoring system

Points were awarded to the top fifteen finishers of the main race and to the top nine of the sprint. A rider had to finish the race to earn points.

Position	1st	2nd	3rd	4th	5th	6th	7th	8th	9th	10th	11th	12th	13th	14th	15th
Race	25	20	16	13	11	10	9	8	7	6	5	4	3	2	1
Sprint	12	9	7	6	5	4	3	2	1						

Pos.	Rider	Bike	Team	QAT (Qatar)	POR (Portugal)	AME (United States)	SPA (Spain)	FRA (France)	CAT (Catalonia)	ITA (Italy)	NED (Netherlands)	GER (Germany)	GBR (United Kingdom)	AUT (Austria)	ARA (Aragon)	RSM (San Marino)	EMI (Emilia-Romagna)	INA (Indonesia)	JPN (Japan)	AUS (Australia)	THA (Thailand)	MAL (Malaysia)	SLD	Pts
1	(Spain) Jorge Martín	Ducati	Prima Pramac Racing	3^{P 1}	1^{3}	4^{3}	Ret^{1}	1^{P 1}	2^{4}	3^{P}	2^{2}	Ret^{P 1 F}	2^{2}	2^{P 2}	2^{2}	15^{1}	2^{2}	1^{P}	2^{4 F}	2^{P 1}	2^{2}	2^{1}	3^{3}	508
2	(Italy) Francesco Bagnaia	Ducati	Ducati Lenovo Team	1^{4}	Ret^{4}	5^{8}	1^{F}	3	1	1^{1 F}	1^{P 1 F}	1^{3}	3	1^{1 F}	Ret^{9}	2^{P 2}	Ret^{P 1 F}	3^{1}	1^{1}	3^{4}	1^{P 3}	1^{P F}	1^{P 1}	498
3	(Spain) Marc Márquez	Ducati	Gresini Racing MotoGP	4^{5}	16^{2}	Ret^{2}	2^{P 6}	2^{2}	3^{2}	4^{2}	10	2^{6}	4	4	1^{P 1 F}	1^{5 F}	3^{4}	Ret^{3}	3^{3}	1^{2 F}	11^{4}	12^{2}	2^{7 F}	392
4	(Italy) Enea Bastianini	Ducati	Ducati Lenovo Team	5^{6}	2^{P 6 F}	3^{6}	5	4^{4 F}	18^{5}	2	3^{4}	4^{4}	1^{1}	3^{4}	5^{7}	3^{4}	1^{3}	Ret^{2 F}	4^{2}	5^{3}	14^{1}	3^{3}	7^{2}	386
5	(South Africa) Brad Binder	KTM	Red Bull KTM Factory Racing	2^{2}	4	9	6	8	8	10^{6}	6^{6}	9^{8}	Ret^{4}	5^{7}	4^{6}	4^{7}	19^{6}	8	6	7	6^{9}	DNS^{7}	6^{9}	217
6	(Spain) Pedro Acosta	KTM	Red Bull GasGas Tech3	9^{8 F}	3^{7}	2^{4}	10^{2}	Ret^{6}	13^{3 F}	5^{3}	Ret	7	9^{5}	13	3^{3}	17^{6}	Ret^{5}	2^{6}	Ret^{P}	DNS	3	5^{9}	10	215
7	(Spain) Maverick Viñales	Aprilia	Aprilia Racing	10^{9}	Ret^{1}	1^{P 1 F}	9	5^{3}	12^{8}	8^{5}	5^{3}	12^{7}	13^{8}	7	Ret	16	6	6^{7}	Ret^{9}	8	7	7	15	190
8	(Spain) Álex Márquez	Ducati	Gresini Racing MotoGP	6^{7}	Ret	15	4	10	7	9^{8}	7^{8}	3^{9}	7^{6}	10	Ret^{4}	6	9	Ret	Ret^{7}	15	10^{5}	4^{4}	4^{5}	173
9	(Italy) Franco Morbidelli	Ducati	Prima Pramac Racing	18	18	Ret	Ret^{4}	7	Ret	6^{4}	9^{9}	5^{5}	10	8^{6}	6	Ret^{3}	5^{9}	4^{5}	5^{5}	6^{5}	Ret^{6}	14^{6}	8^{6}	173
10	(Italy) Fabio Di Giannantonio	Ducati	Pertamina Enduro VR46 Racing Team	7	10	6	7	6^{7}	5^{6}	7^{7}	4^{5}	Ret	5^{9}	DNS	8	9	14	Ret^{9}	8^{6}	4^{7}	4^{8 F}			165
11	(Spain) Aleix Espargaró	Aprilia	Aprilia Racing	8^{3}	8^{8}	7^{5}	Ret	9^{5}	4^{P 1}	11^{9}	DNS	WD	6^{P 3 F}	9^{3}	10	Ret	8	Ret	9	16^{8}	9	13	5^{4}	163
12	(Italy) Marco Bezzecchi	Ducati	Pertamina Enduro VR46 Racing Team	14	6	8	3	Ret	11^{9}	13	Ret	8	8	6^{8}	7	5	4^{8}	5^{4}	7	19	Ret^{7}	9	9^{8}	153
13	(France) Fabio Quartararo	Yamaha	Monster Energy Yamaha MotoGP Team	11	7^{9}	12	15^{5}	Ret	9	18	12^{7}	11	11	18	Ret^{8}	7^{9}	7^{7}	7	12	9	16	6^{5}	11	113
14	(Australia) Jack Miller	KTM	Red Bull KTM Factory Racing	21	5^{5}	13^{7}	Ret	Ret^{8}	Ret^{7}	16	11	13	12^{7}	19^{5}	15	8^{8}	16	Ret	10^{8}	11	5	DNS^{8}	13	87
15	(Portugal) Miguel Oliveira	Aprilia	Trackhouse Racing	15	9	11	8^{8}	Ret	10	14	15	6^{2}	Ret	12	Ret^{5}	11	10	DNS					12	75
16	(Spain) Raúl Fernández	Aprilia	Trackhouse Racing	Ret	Ret	10^{9}	11	11^{9}	6	12	8	10	Ret	Ret	16	18	13	10	15	10^{6}	Ret	16	18	66
17	(France) Johann Zarco	Honda	Castrol Honda LCR	12	15	Ret	Ret	12	16	19	13	17	14	21	13	12	15	9^{8}	11	12	8	11	14	55
18	(Spain) Álex Rins	Yamaha	Monster Energy Yamaha MotoGP Team	16	13	Ret	13	15	20	15	Ret		DNS	16	9	19	DNS	11	16	13	Ret	8	21	31
19	(Japan) Takaaki Nakagami	Honda	Idemitsu Honda LCR	19	14	Ret	14	14	14	Ret	16	14	15	14	11	13	17	12	13	18	13	Ret	17	31
20	(Spain) Augusto Fernández	KTM	Red Bull GasGas Tech3	17	11	14	Ret^{7}	13	Ret	Ret	14	16	16	15	12	Ret	18	Ret	Ret	17^{9}	Ret	10	19	27
21	(Spain) Joan Mir	Honda	Repsol Honda Team	13	12	Ret	12^{9}	Ret	15	Ret	Ret	18	Ret	17	14	WD	11	Ret	Ret	Ret	15	Ret	Ret	21
22	(Italy) Luca Marini	Honda	Repsol Honda Team	20	17	16	17	16	17	20	17	15	17	Ret	17	DNS	12	Ret	14	14	12	15	16	14
23	(Spain) Pol Espargaró	KTM	Red Bull KTM Factory Racing							17				11^{9}		10								12
24	(Spain) Dani Pedrosa	KTM	Red Bull KTM Factory Racing				Ret^{3}																	7
25	(Germany) Stefan Bradl	Honda	HRC Test Team				16		19			20		22		14							22	2
26	(Australia) Remy Gardner	Yamaha	Monster Energy Yamaha MotoGP Team									19	18											0
26	(Australia) Remy Gardner	Yamaha	Yamaha Factory Racing Team																17					0
27	(Italy) Andrea Iannone	Ducati	Pertamina Enduro VR46 Racing Team																			17		0
28	(Italy) Lorenzo Savadori	Aprilia	Aprilia Racing				Ret			21	DNS			20										0
28	(Italy) Lorenzo Savadori	Aprilia	Trackhouse Racing																Ret	Ret	Ret	18		0
29	(Italy) Michele Pirro	Ducati	Pertamina Enduro VR46 Racing Team																				20	0
Pos.	Rider	Bike	Team	QAT (Qatar)	POR (Portugal)	AME (United States)	SPA (Spain)	FRA (France)	CAT (Catalonia)	ITA (Italy)	NED (Netherlands)	GER (Germany)	GBR (United Kingdom)	AUT (Austria)	ARA (Aragon)	RSM (San Marino)	EMI (Emilia-Romagna)	INA (Indonesia)	JPN (Japan)	AUS (Australia)	THA (Thailand)	MAL (Malaysia)	SLD	Pts

Race key
Colour	Result
Gold	Winner
Silver	2nd place
Bronze	3rd place
Green	Points finish
Blue	Non-points finish
Blue	Non-classified finish (NC)
Purple	Retired (Ret)
Red	Did not qualify (DNQ)
Black	Disqualified (DSQ)
White	Did not start (DNS)
White	Withdrew (WD)
White	Race cancelled (C)
Blank	Did not practice (DNP)
Blank	Excluded (EX)
Blank	Did not arrive (DNA)
Blank	Did not enter (empty cell)
Annotation	Meaning
P	Pole position
Superscript number	Points-scoring position in sprint race
F	Fastest lap
Rider key
Colour	Meaning
Light blue	Rookie rider

=== Constructors' standings ===
Each constructor was awarded the same number of points as their best placed rider in each race.

Pos.	Constructor	QAT (Qatar)	POR (Portugal)	AME (United States)	SPA (Spain)	FRA (France)	CAT (Catalonia)	ITA (Italy)	NED (Netherlands)	GER (Germany)	GBR (United Kingdom)	AUT (Austria)	ARA (Aragon)	RSM (San Marino)	EMI (Emilia-Romagna)	INA (Indonesia)	JPN (Japan)	AUS (Australia)	THA (Thailand)	MAL (Malaysia)	SLD	Pts
1	(Italy) Ducati	1^{1}	1^{2}	3^{2}	1^{1}	1^{1}	1^{2}	1^{1}	1^{1}	1^{1}	1^{1}	1^{1}	1^{1}	1^{1}	1^{1}	1^{1}	1^{1}	1^{1}	1^{1}	1^{1}	1^{1}	722
2	(Austria) KTM	2^{2}	3^{5}	2^{4}	6^{2}	8^{6}	8^{3}	5^{3}	6^{6}	7^{8}	9^{4}	5^{5}	3^{3}	4^{6}	16^{5}	2^{6}	6^{8}	7^{9}	3^{9}	5^{7}	6^{9}	327
3	(Italy) Aprilia	8^{3}	8^{1}	1^{1}	8^{8}	5^{3}	4^{1}	8^{5}	5^{3}	6^{2}	6^{3}	7^{3}	10^{5}	11	6	6^{7}	9^{9}	8^{6}	7	7	5^{4}	302
4	(Japan) Yamaha	11	7^{9}	12	13^{5}	15	9	15	12^{7}	11	11	16	9^{8}	7^{9}	7^{7}	7	12	9	16	6^{5}	11	124
5	(Japan) Honda	12	12	16	12^{9}	12	14	19	13	14	14	14	11	12	11	9^{8}	11	12	8	11	14	75
Pos.	Constructor	QAT (Qatar)	POR (Portugal)	AME (United States)	SPA (Spain)	FRA (France)	CAT (Catalonia)	ITA (Italy)	NED (Netherlands)	GER (Germany)	GBR (United Kingdom)	AUT (Austria)	ARA (Aragon)	RSM (San Marino)	EMI (Emilia-Romagna)	INA (Indonesia)	JPN (Japan)	AUS (Australia)	THA (Thailand)	MAL (Malaysia)	SLD	Pts

=== Teams' standings ===
The teams' standings were based on results obtained by regular and substitute riders; wild-card entries were ineligible.

Pos.	Team	Bike No.	QAT (Qatar)	POR (Portugal)	AME (United States)	SPA (Spain)	FRA (France)	CAT (Catalonia)	ITA (Italy)	NED (Netherlands)	GER (Germany)	GBR (United Kingdom)	AUT (Austria)	ARA (Aragon)	RSM (San Marino)	EMI (Emilia-Romagna)	INA (Indonesia)	JPN (Japan)	AUS (Australia)	THA (Thailand)	MAL (Malaysia)	SLD	Pts
1	(Italy) Ducati Lenovo Team	1	1^{4}	Ret^{4}	5^{8}	1^{F}	3	1	1^{1 F}	1^{P 1 F}	1^{3}	3	1^{1 F}	Ret^{9}	2^{P 2}	Ret^{P 1 F}	3^{1}	1^{1}	3^{4}	1^{P 3}	1^{P F}	1^{P 1}	884
1	(Italy) Ducati Lenovo Team	23	5^{6}	2^{P 6 F}	3^{6}	5	4^{4 F}	18^{5}	2	3^{4}	4^{4}	1^{1}	3^{4}	5^{7}	3^{4}	1^{3}	Ret^{2 F}	4^{2}	5^{3}	14^{1}	3^{3}	7^{2}	884
2	(Italy) Prima Pramac Racing	21	18	18	Ret	Ret^{4}	7	Ret	6^{4}	9^{9}	5^{5}	10	8^{6}	6	Ret^{3}	5^{9}	4^{5}	5^{5}	6^{5}	Ret^{6}	14^{6}	8^{6}	681
2	(Italy) Prima Pramac Racing	89	3^{P 1}	1^{3}	4^{3}	Ret^{1}	1^{P 1}	2^{4}	3^{P}	2^{2}	Ret^{P 1 F}	2^{2}	2^{P 2}	2^{2}	15^{1}	2^{2}	1^{P}	2^{4 F}	2^{P 1}	2^{2}	2^{1}	3^{3}	681
3	(Italy) Gresini Racing MotoGP	73	6^{7}	Ret	15	4	10	7	9^{8}	7^{8}	3^{9}	7^{6}	10	Ret^{4}	6	9	Ret	Ret^{7}	15	10^{5}	4^{4}	4^{5}	565
3	(Italy) Gresini Racing MotoGP	93	4^{5}	16^{2}	Ret^{2}	2^{P 6}	2^{2}	3^{2}	4^{2}	10	2^{6}	4	4	1^{P 1 F}	1^{5 F}	3^{4}	Ret^{3}	3^{3}	1^{2 F}	11^{4}	12^{2}	2^{7 F}	565
4	(Italy) Aprilia Racing	12	10^{9}	Ret^{1}	1^{P 1 F}	9	5^{3}	12^{8}	8^{5}	5^{3}	12^{7}	13^{8}	7	Ret	16	6	6^{7}	Ret^{9}	8	7	7	15	353
4	(Italy) Aprilia Racing	41	8^{3}	8^{8}	7^{5}	Ret	9^{5}	4^{P 1}	11^{9}	DNS	WD	6^{P 3 F}	9^{3}	10	Ret	8	Ret	9	16^{8}	9	13	5^{4}	353
5	(Italy) Pertamina Enduro VR46 Racing Team	29																			17		318
5	(Italy) Pertamina Enduro VR46 Racing Team	49	7	10	6	7	6^{7}	5^{6}	7^{7}	4^{5}	Ret	5^{9}	DNS	8	9	14	Ret^{9}	8^{6}	4^{7}	4^{8 F}			318
5	(Italy) Pertamina Enduro VR46 Racing Team	51																				20	318
5	(Italy) Pertamina Enduro VR46 Racing Team	72	14	6	8	3	Ret	11^{9}	13	Ret	8	8	6^{8}	7	5	4^{8}	4^{5}	7	19	Ret^{7}	9	9^{8}	318
6	(Austria) Red Bull KTM Factory Racing	33	2^{2}	4	9	6	8	8	10^{6}	6^{6}	9^{8}	Ret^{4}	5^{7}	4^{6}	4^{7}	19^{6}	8	6	7	6^{9}	DNS^{7}	6^{9}	304
6	(Austria) Red Bull KTM Factory Racing	43	21	5^{5}	13^{7}	Ret	Ret^{8}	Ret^{7}	16	11	13	12^{7}	19^{5}	15	8^{8}	16	Ret	10^{8}	11	5	DNS^{8}	13	304
7	(France) Red Bull GasGas Tech3	31	9^{8 F}	3^{7}	2^{4}	10^{2}	Ret^{6}	13^{3 F}	5^{3}	Ret	7	9^{5}	13	3^{3}	17^{6}	Ret^{5}	2^{6}	Ret^{P}	DNS	3	5^{9}	10	242
7	(France) Red Bull GasGas Tech3	37	17	11	14	Ret^{7}	13	Ret	Ret	14	16	16	15	12	Ret	18	Ret	Ret	17^{9}	Ret	10	19	242
8	(Japan) Monster Energy Yamaha MotoGP Team	20	11	7^{9}	12	15^{5}	Ret	9	18	12^{7}	11	11	18	Ret^{8}	7^{9}	7^{7}	7	12	9	16	6^{5}	11	144
8	(Japan) Monster Energy Yamaha MotoGP Team	42	16	13	Ret	13	15	20	15	Ret		DNS	16	9	19	DNS	11	16	13	Ret	8	21	144
8	(Japan) Monster Energy Yamaha MotoGP Team	87									19												144
9	(United States) Trackhouse Racing	25	Ret	Ret	10^{9}	11	11^{9}	6	12	8	10	Ret	Ret	16	18	13	10	15	10^{6}	Ret	16	18	141
9	(United States) Trackhouse Racing	32																Ret	Ret	Ret	18		141
9	(United States) Trackhouse Racing	88	15	9	11	8^{8}	Ret	10	14	15	6^{2}	Ret	12	Ret^{5}	11	10	DNS					12	141
10	(Monaco) LCR Honda	5	12	15	Ret	Ret	12	16	19	13	17	14	21	13	12	15	9^{8}	11	12	8	11	14	86
10	(Monaco) LCR Honda	30	19	14	Ret	14	14	14	Ret	16	14	15	14	11	13	17	12	13	18	13	Ret	17	86
11	(Japan) Repsol Honda Team	10	20	17	16	17	16	17	20	17	15	17	Ret	17	DNS	12	Ret	14	14	12	15	16	35
11	(Japan) Repsol Honda Team	36	13	12	Ret	12^{9}	Ret	15	Ret	Ret	18	Ret	17	14	WD	11	Ret	Ret	Ret	15	Ret	Ret	35
Pos.	Team	Bike No.	QAT (Qatar)	POR (Portugal)	AME (United States)	SPA (Spain)	FRA (France)	CAT (Catalonia)	ITA (Italy)	NED (Netherlands)	GER (Germany)	GBR (United Kingdom)	AUT (Austria)	ARA (Aragon)	RSM (San Marino)	EMI (Emilia-Romagna)	INA (Indonesia)	JPN (Japan)	AUS (Australia)	THA (Thailand)	MAL (Malaysia)	SLD	Pts
