= 2024 Solidarity motorcycle Grand Prix =

Motorcycle races in Montmeló

2024 Solidarity Grand Prix
Race details
- Race 20 of 20 races in the 2024 Grand Prix motorcycle racing season
- Date: 17 November 2024
- Official name: Motul Solidarity Grand Prix of Barcelona
- Location: Circuit de Barcelona-Catalunya; Montmeló, Spain
- Course: Permanent racing facility; 4.657 km (2.894 mi)

MotoGP
Pole position
Rider	(Italy) Francesco Bagnaia	Ducati
Time	1:38.641	
Fastest lap
Rider	(Spain) Marc Márquez	Ducati
Time	1:40.088 on lap 4	
Podium
First	(Italy) Francesco Bagnaia	Ducati
Second	(Spain) Marc Márquez	Ducati
Third	(Spain) Jorge Martín	Ducati

Moto2
Pole position
Rider	(Spain) Arón Canet	Kalex
Time	1:42.003	
Fastest lap
Rider	(Spain) Sergio García	Boscoscuro
Time	1:43.299 on lap 4	
Podium
First	(Spain) Arón Canet	Kalex
Second	(Spain) Manuel González	Kalex
Third	(Brazil) Diogo Moreira	Kalex

Moto3
Pole position
Rider	(Colombia) David Alonso	CFMoto
Time	1:45.905	
Fastest lap
Rider	(Spain) Daniel Holgado	Gas Gas
Time	1:47.315 on lap 18	
Podium
First	(Colombia) David Alonso	CFMoto
Second	(Spain) Daniel Holgado	Gas Gas
Third	(Spain) Ángel Piqueras	Honda

The 2024 Solidarity motorcycle Grand Prix (officially known as the Motul Solidarity Grand Prix of Barcelona) was the twentieth and final round of the 2024 Grand Prix motorcycle racing season. It was held at the Circuit de Barcelona-Catalunya in Montmeló on 17 November 2024.

In the MotoGP class, Jorge Martín, riding for the satellite Ducati team Prima Pramac Racing, clinched the Riders' Championship during the main race. He became the first rider since Valentino Rossi in 2001 and the first overall during the MotoGP era to win the Riders' Championship with a satellite team.

== Background ==
Following the cancellation of the Valencian Community Grand Prix, due to flooding in the region caused by cold drop, which was to be held on the weekend of 15–17 November 2024 as the last round of the championship, organizers of the MotoGP World Championship decided to create the Barcelona Solidarity Grand Prix under the motto "Racing for Valencia". Proceeds of the event were to be donated to Valencian flood victims.

== MotoGP Sprint ==
The MotoGP Sprint was held on 16 November.

Pos.	No.	Rider	Team	Constructor	Laps	Time/Retired	Grid	Points
1	1	(Italy) Francesco Bagnaia	Ducati Lenovo Team	Ducati	12	20:03.173	1	12
2	23	(Italy) Enea Bastianini	Ducati Lenovo Team	Ducati	12	+0.942	8	9
3	89	(Spain) Jorge Martín	Prima Pramac Racing	Ducati	12	+1.270	4	7
4	41	(Spain) Aleix Espargaró	Aprilia Racing	Aprilia	12	+1.857	2	6
5	73	(Spain) Álex Márquez	Gresini Racing MotoGP	Ducati	12	+1.942	11	5
6	21	(Italy) Franco Morbidelli	Prima Pramac Racing	Ducati	12	+5.263	5	4
7	93	(Spain) Marc Márquez	Gresini Racing MotoGP	Ducati	12	+5.303	3	3
8	72	(Italy) Marco Bezzecchi	Pertamina Enduro VR46 Racing Team	Ducati	12	+5.507	9	2
9	33	(South Africa) Brad Binder	Red Bull KTM Factory Racing	KTM	12	+5.573	18	1
10	20	(France) Fabio Quartararo	Monster Energy Yamaha MotoGP Team	Yamaha	12	+5.937	10	
11	5	(France) Johann Zarco	Castrol Honda LCR	Honda	12	+7.413	12	
12	12	(Spain) Maverick Viñales	Aprilia Racing	Aprilia	12	+8.344	7	
13	36	(Spain) Joan Mir	Repsol Honda Team	Honda	12	+9.387	13	
14	25	(Spain) Raúl Fernández	Trackhouse Racing	Aprilia	12	+9.652	17	
15	10	(Italy) Luca Marini	Repsol Honda Team	Honda	12	+11.838	16	
16	42	(Spain) Álex Rins	Monster Energy Yamaha MotoGP Team	Yamaha	12	+13.217	15	
17	30	(Japan) Takaaki Nakagami	Idemitsu Honda LCR	Honda	12	+17.017	20	
18	88	(Portugal) Miguel Oliveira	Trackhouse Racing	Aprilia	12	+17.746	14	
19	43	(Australia) Jack Miller	Red Bull KTM Factory Racing	KTM	12	+18.533	19	
20	37	(Spain) Augusto Fernández	Red Bull GasGas Tech3	KTM	12	+20.153	21	
21	51	(Italy) Michele Pirro	Pertamina Enduro VR46 Racing Team	Ducati	12	+20.547	22	
22	6	(Germany) Stefan Bradl	HRC Test Team	Honda	12	+24.604	23	
Ret	31	(Spain) Pedro Acosta	Red Bull GasGas Tech3	KTM	1	Fix	6	
Fastest lap: (Italy) Francesco Bagnaia (Ducati) – 1:39.171 (lap 2)
OFFICIAL MOTOGP SPRINT REPORT

== Race ==
=== MotoGP ===
Pos.	No.	Rider	Team	Constructor	Laps	Time/Retired	Grid	Points
1	1	(Italy) Francesco Bagnaia	Ducati Lenovo Team	Ducati	24	40:24.740	1	25
2	93	(Spain) Marc Márquez	Gresini Racing MotoGP	Ducati	24	+1.474	3	20
3	89	(Spain) Jorge Martín	Prima Pramac Racing	Ducati	24	+3.810	4	16
4	73	(Spain) Álex Márquez	Gresini Racing MotoGP	Ducati	24	+5.322	11	13
5	41	(Spain) Aleix Espargaró	Aprilia Racing	Aprilia	24	+5.753	2	11
6	33	(South Africa) Brad Binder	Red Bull KTM Factory Racing	KTM	24	+7.081	18	10
7	23	(Italy) Enea Bastianini	Ducati Lenovo Team	Ducati	24	+7.393	8	9
8	21	(Italy) Franco Morbidelli	Prima Pramac Racing	Ducati	24	+8.709	5	8
9	72	(Italy) Marco Bezzecchi	Pertamina Enduro VR46 Racing Team	Ducati	24	+10.484	9	7
10	31	(Spain) Pedro Acosta	Red Bull GasGas Tech3	KTM	24	+10.618	6	6
11	20	(France) Fabio Quartararo	Monster Energy Yamaha MotoGP Team	Yamaha	24	+10.756	10	5
12	88	(Portugal) Miguel Oliveira	Trackhouse Racing	Aprilia	24	+13.464	14	4
13	43	(Australia) Jack Miller	Red Bull KTM Factory Racing	KTM	24	+14.560	19	3
14	5	(France) Johann Zarco	Castrol Honda LCR	Honda	24	+19.469	12	2
15	12	(Spain) Maverick Viñales	Aprilia Racing	Aprilia	24	+22.195	7	1
16	10	(Italy) Luca Marini	Repsol Honda Team	Honda	24	+23.890	16	
17	30	(Japan) Takaaki Nakagami	Idemitsu Honda LCR	Honda	24	+23.690	20	
18	25	(Spain) Raúl Fernández	Trackhouse Racing	Aprilia	24	+29.001	17	
19	37	(Spain) Augusto Fernández	Red Bull GasGas Tech3	KTM	24	+29.145	21	
20	42	(Spain) Álex Rins	Monster Energy Yamaha MotoGP Team	Yamaha	24	+30.138	15	
21	51	(Italy) Michele Pirro	Pertamina Enduro VR46 Racing Team	Ducati	24	+37.295	22	
22	6	(Germany) Stefan Bradl	HRC Test Team	Honda	24	+47.654	23	
Ret	36	(Spain) Joan Mir	Repsol Honda Team	Honda	6	Accident	13	
Fastest lap: (Spain) Marc Márquez (Ducati) – 1:40.088 (lap 4)
OFFICIAL MOTOGP RACE REPORT

== Championship standings after the race ==
Below are the standings for the top five riders, constructors, and teams after the round.

=== MotoGP ===
Riders' Championship standings

	Pos.	Rider	Points
	1	(Spain) Jorge Martín	508
	2	(Italy) Francesco Bagnaia	498
	3	(Spain) Marc Márquez	392
	4	(Italy) Enea Bastianini	386
1	5	(South Africa) Brad Binder	217

Constructors' Championship standings

Pos.	Constructor	Points
1	(Italy) Ducati	722
2	(Austria) KTM	327
3	(Italy) Aprilia	302
4	(Japan) Yamaha	124
5	(Japan) Honda	75

Teams' Championship standings

Pos.	Team	Points
1	(Italy) Ducati Lenovo Team	884
2	(Italy) Prima Pramac Racing	681
3	(Italy) Gresini Racing MotoGP	565
4	(Italy) Aprilia Racing	353
5	(Italy) Pertamina Enduro VR46 Racing Team	318

=== Moto2 ===
Riders' Championship standings

	Pos.	Rider	Points
	1	(Japan) Ai Ogura	274
	2	(Spain) Arón Canet	234
2	3	(Spain) Manuel González	195
1	4	(Spain) Sergio García	191
1	5	(Spain) Fermín Aldeguer	182

Constructors' Championship standings

Pos.	Constructor	Points
1	(Germany) Kalex	437
2	(Italy) Boscoscuro	389
3	(Switzerland) Forward	16

Teams' Championship standings

	Pos.	Team	Points
	1	(Spain) MT Helmets – MSi	465
	2	(Italy) Sync Speed Up	361
	3	(United States) OnlyFans American Racing Team	290
	4	(Italy) Gresini Moto2	275
2	5	(Italy) Fantic Racing	234

=== Moto3 ===
Riders' Championship standings

Pos.	Rider	Points
1	(Colombia) David Alonso	421
2	(Spain) Daniel Holgado	256
3	(Netherlands) Collin Veijer	242
4	(Spain) Iván Ortolá	224
5	(Spain) David Muñoz	172

Constructors' Championship standings

Pos.	Constructor	Points
1	(China) CFMoto	421
2	(Austria) KTM	333
3	(Japan) Honda	300
4	(Sweden) Husqvarna	269
5	(Spain) Gas Gas	265

Teams' Championship standings

	Pos.	Team	Points
	1	(Spain) CFMoto Valresa Aspar Team	466
	2	(Spain) MT Helmets – MSi	355
	3	(Germany) Liqui Moly Husqvarna Intact GP	333
1	4	(France) Red Bull GasGas Tech3	322
1	5	(Luxembourg) Leopard Racing	311

Previous race: 2024 Malaysian Grand Prix	FIM Grand Prix World Championship; 2024 season	Next race: 2025 Thailand Grand Prix
Previous race: None	Solidarity motorcycle Grand Prix	Next race: None
