= 2024 Spanish motorcycle Grand Prix =

Motorcycle races in Jerez de la Frontera

(Spain) 2024 Spanish Grand Prix
Race details
- Race 4 of 20 races in the 2024 Grand Prix motorcycle racing season
- Date: 28 April 2024
- Official name: Gran Premio Estrella Galicia 0,0 de España
- Location: Circuito de Jerez – Ángel Nieto; Jerez de la Frontera, Cádiz, Spain
- Course: Permanent racing facility; 4.423 km (2.748 mi)

MotoGP
Pole position
Rider	(Spain) Marc Márquez	Ducati
Time	1:46.773	
Fastest lap
Rider	(Italy) Francesco Bagnaia	Ducati
Time	1:37.449 on lap 23	
Podium
First	(Italy) Francesco Bagnaia	Ducati
Second	(Spain) Marc Márquez	Ducati
Third	(Italy) Marco Bezzecchi	Ducati

Moto2
Pole position
Rider	(Spain) Fermín Aldeguer	Boscoscuro
Time	1:40.673	
Fastest lap
Rider	(Spain) Fermín Aldeguer	Boscoscuro
Time	1:41.020 on lap 9	
Podium
First	(Spain) Fermín Aldeguer	Boscoscuro
Second	(United States) Joe Roberts	Kalex
Third	(Spain) Manuel González	Kalex

Moto3
Pole position
Rider	(Colombia) David Alonso	CFMoto
Time	1:44.954	
Fastest lap
Rider	(Japan) Ryusei Yamanaka	KTM
Time	1:45.105 on lap 8	
Podium
First	(Netherlands) Collin Veijer	Husqvarna
Second	(Spain) David Muñoz	KTM
Third	(Spain) Iván Ortolá	KTM

The 2024 Spanish motorcycle Grand Prix (officially known as the Gran Premio Estrella Galicia 0,0 de España) was the fourth round of the 2024 Grand Prix motorcycle racing season. It was held at the Circuito de Jerez – Ángel Nieto in Jerez de la Frontera on 28 April 2024.

== Practice session ==
=== MotoGP ===
==== Combined Free Practice 1-2 ====
Fastest session lap

Pos.	No.	Biker	Team	Constructor	Free practice times	
Pos.	No.	Biker	Team	Constructor	P1	P2
1	73	(Spain) Álex Márquez	Gresini Racing MotoGP	Ducati	**1:36.630**	1:48.901
2	93	(Spain) Marc Márquez	Gresini Racing MotoGP	Ducati	1:37.137	**1:48.183**
3	12	(Spain) Maverick Viñales	Aprilia Racing	Aprilia	1:37.221	1:48.749
4	41	(Spain) Aleix Espargaró	Aprilia Racing	Aprilia	1:37.303	1:48.902
5	21	(Italy) Franco Morbidelli	Prima Pramac Racing	Ducati	1:37.547	1:48.875
6	72	(Italy) Marco Bezzecchi	Pertamina Enduro VR46 MotoGP Team	Ducati	1:37.585	1:48.988
7	26	(Spain) Dani Pedrosa	Red Bull KTM Factory Racing	KTM	1:37.613	1:49.249
8	33	(South Africa) Brad Binder	Red Bull KTM Factory Racing	KTM	1:37.618	1:50.027
9	89	(Spain) Jorge Martín	Prima Pramac Racing	Ducati	1:37.635	1:49.083
10	31	(Spain) Pedro Acosta	Red Bull GASGAS Tech3	KTM	1:37.642	1:48.850
11	49	(Italy) Fabio Di Giannantonio	Pertamina Enduro VR46 MotoGP Team	Ducati	1:37.724	1:48.259
12	1	(Italy) Francesco Bagnaia	Ducati Lenovo Team	Ducati	1:37.792	1:49.514
13	23	(Italy) Enea Bastianini	Ducati Lenovo Team	Ducati	1:37.886	1:49.514
14	20	(France) Fabio Quartararo	Monster Energy Yamaha MotoGP	Yamaha	1:38.012	1:49.810
15	88	(Portugal) Miguel Oliveira	Trackhouse Racing	Aprilia	1:38.049	1:48.794
16	43	(Australia) Jack Miller	Red Bull KTM Factory Racing	KTM	1:38.078	1:49.145
17	42	(Spain) Álex Rins	Monster Energy Yamaha MotoGP	Yamaha	1:38.203	1:50.220
18	25	(Spain) Raúl Fernández	Trackhouse Racing	Aprilia	1:38.247	1:48.722
19	5	(France) Johann Zarco	CASTROL Honda LCR	Honda	1:38.360	1:49.930
20	37	(Spain) Augusto Fernández	Red Bull GASGAS Tech3	KTM	1:38.370	1:49.515
21	30	(Japan) Takaaki Nakagami	IDEMITSU Honda LCR	Honda	1:38.539	1:50.358
22	36	(Spain) Joan Mir	Repsol Honda Team	Honda	1:38.574	1:50.192
23	32	(Italy) Lorenzo Savadori	Aprilia Racing	Aprilia	1:38.728	1:50.748
24	6	(Germany) Stefan Bradl	HRC Test Team	Honda	1:37.221	1:48.749
25	10	(Italy) Luca Marini	Repsol Honda Team	Honda	1:38.775	1:50.824
OFFICIAL MOTOGP COMBINED PRACTICE TIMES REPORT

==== Practice ====
The top ten riders (written in bold) qualified for Q2.

Pos.	No.	Biker	Team	Constructor	
Pos.	No.	Biker	Team	Constructor	Time results
1	1	**(Italy) Francesco Bagnaia**	**Ducati Lenovo Team**	**Ducati**	**1:36.025**
2	12	**(Spain) Maverick Viñales**	**Aprilia Racing**	**Aprilia**	1:36.125
3	93	**(Spain) Marc Márquez**	**Gresini Racing MotoGP**	**Ducati**	1:36.168
4	72	**(Italy) Marco Bezzecchi**	**Pertamina Enduro VR46 MotoGP Team**	**Ducati**	1:36.364
5	89	**(Spain) Jorge Martín**	**Prima Pramac Racing**	**Ducati**	1:36.435
6	31	(Spain) **Pedro Acosta**	**Red Bull GASGAS Tech3**	**KTM**	1:36.439
7	41	(Spain) **Aleix Espargaró**	**Aprilia Racing**	**Aprilia**	1:36.446
8	23	**(Italy) Enea Bastianini**	**Ducati Lenovo Team**	**Ducati**	1:36.480
9	49	(Italy) **Fabio Di Giannantonio**	**Pertamina Enduro VR46 MotoGP Team**	**Ducati**	1:36.536
10	73	(Spain) **Álex Márquez**	**Gresini Racing MotoGP**	**Ducati**	1:36.539
11	33	(South Africa) Brad Binder	Red Bull KTM Factory Racing	KTM	1:36.644
12	21	(Italy) Franco Morbidelli	Prima Pramac Racing	Ducati	1:36.711
13	43	(Australia) Jack Miller	Red Bull KTM Factory Racing	KTM	1:36.900
14	26	(Spain) Dani Pedrosa	Red Bull KTM Factory Racing	KTM	1:36.944
15	42	(Spain) Álex Rins	Monster Energy Yamaha MotoGP	Yamaha	1:36.959
16	30	(Japan) Takaaki Nakagami	IDEMITSU Honda LCR	Honda	1:36.969
17	25	(Spain) Raúl Fernández	Trackhouse Racing	Aprilia	1:37.111
18	5	(France) Johann Zarco	CASTROL Honda LCR	Honda	1:37.277
19	88	(Portugal) Miguel Oliveira	Trackhouse Racing	Aprilia	1:37.342
20	20	(France) Fabio Quartararo	Monster Energy Yamaha MotoGP	Yamaha	1:37.382
21	36	(Spain) Joan Mir	Repsol Honda Team	Honda	1:37.476
22	37	(Spain) Augusto Fernández	Red Bull GASGAS Tech3	KTM	1:37.611
23	6	(Germany) Stefan Bradl	HRC Test Team	Honda	1:37.709
24	10	(Italy) Luca Marini	Repsol Honda Team	Honda	1:37.838
25	32	(Italy) Lorenzo Savadori	Aprilia Racing	Aprilia	1:37.902
OFFICIAL MOTOGP PRACTICE TIMES REPORT

=== Moto2 ===
==== Free practice ====
Pos.	No.	Biker	Team	Constructor	
Pos.	No.	Biker	Team	Constructor	Time results
1	21	(Spain) Alonso López	Beta Tools SpeedUp	Boscoscuro	**1:40.797**
2	35	(Thailand) Somkiat Chantra	IDEMITSU Honda Team Asia	Kalex	1:40.917
3	18	(Spain) Manuel González	QJMOTOR Gresini Moto2	Kalex	1:41.039
4	13	(Italy) Celestino Vietti	Red Bull KTM Ajo	Kalex	1:41.109
5	54	(Spain) Fermin Aldeguer	Beta Tools SpeedUp	Boscoscuro	1:41.148
6	16	(United States) Joe Roberts	OnlyFans American Racing Team	Kalex	1:41.192
7	7	(Belgium) Barry Baltus	RW-Idrofoglia Racing GP	Kalex	1:41.274
8	3	(Spain) Sergio García	MT Helmets - MSI	Boscoscuro	1:41.308
9	84	(Netherlands) Zonta van den Goorbergh	RW-Idrofoglia Racing GP	Kalex	1:41.327
10	44	(Spain) Arón Canet	Fantic Racing	Kalex	1:41.371
11	28	(Spain) Izan Guevara	CFMOTO Aspar Team	Kalex	1:41.385
12	12	(Czech Republic) Filip Salač	Elf Marc VDS Racing Team	Kalex	1:41.385
13	79	(Japan) Ai Ogura	MT Helmets - MSI	Boscoscuro	1:41.451
14	24	(Spain) Marcos Ramírez	OnlyFans American Racing Team	Kalex	1:41.454
15	5	(Spain) Jaume Masià	Pertamina Mandalika GAS UP Team	Kalex	1:41.488
16	53	(Turkey) Deniz Öncü	Red Bull KTM Ajo	Kalex	1:41.542
17	52	(Spain) Jeremy Alcoba	Yamaha VR46 Master Camp Team	Kalex	1:41.659
18	96	(United Kingdom) Jake Dixon	CFMOTO Aspar Team	Kalex	1:41.727
19	75	(Spain) Albert Arenas	QJMOTOR Gresini Moto2	Kalex	1:41.771
20	81	(Australia) Senna Agius	Liqui Moly Husqvarna Intact GP	Kalex	1:41.861
21	14	(Italy) Tony Arbolino	Elf Marc VDS Racing Team	Kalex	1:41.960
22	71	(Italy) Dennis Foggia	Italtrans Racing Team	Kalex	1:41.963
23	64	(Netherlands) Bo Bendsneyder	Pertamina Mandalika GAS UP Team	Kalex	1:42.203
24	15	(South Africa) Darryn Binder	Liqui Moly Husqvarna Intact GP	Kalex	1:42.322
25	34	(Indonesia) Mario Aji	IDEMITSU Honda Team Asia	Kalex	1:42.356
26	10	(Brazil) Diogo Moreira	Italtrans Racing Team	Kalex	1:42.538
27	23	(Italy) Matteo Ferrari	QJMOTOR Gresini Moto2	Kalex	1:42.803
28	20	(Andorra) Xavi Cardelús	Fantic Racing	Kalex	1:42.923
29	22	(Japan) Ayumu Sasaki	Yamaha VR46 Master Camp Team	Kalex	1:42.962
30	11	(Spain) Álex Escrig	KLINT Forward Factory Team	Forward Racing	1:43.220
31	43	(Spain) Xavier Artigas	KLINT Forward Factory Team	Forward Racing	1:43.530
NC	9	(Spain) Jorge Navarro	KLINT Forward Factory Team	Forward Racing	No time
OFFICIAL MOTO2 FREE PRACTICE TIMES REPORT

==== Combined Practice 1-2 ====
The top fourteen riders (written in bold) qualified for Q2.

Fastest session lap

Pos.	No.	Biker	Team	Constructor	Free practice times	
Pos.	No.	Biker	Team	Constructor	P1	P2
1	16	(United States) **Joe Roberts**	**OnlyFans American Racing Team**	**Kalex**	**1:40.664**	1:55.339
2	54	(Spain) **Fermin Aldeguer**	**Beta Tools SpeedUp**	**Boscoscuro**	1:40.898	1:58.791
3	3	(Spain) **Sergio García**	**MT Helmets - MSI**	**Boscoscuro**	1:40.931	**1:54.051**
4	24	(Spain) **Marcos Ramírez**	**OnlyFans American Racing Team**	**Kalex**	1:40.964	1:58.112
5	79	(Japan) **Ai Ogura**	**MT Helmets - MSI**	**Boscoscuro**	1:40.993	1:54.732
6	18	(Spain) **Manuel González**	**QJMOTOR Gresini Moto2**	**Kalex**	1:40.999	1:57.439
7	84	(Netherlands) **Zonta van den Goorbergh**	**RW-Idrofoglia Racing GP**	**Kalex**	1:41.135	1:58.763
8	21	(Spain) **Alonso López**	**Beta Tools SpeedUp**	**Boscoscuro**	1:41.215	1:54.935
9	75	(Spain) **Albert Arenas**	**QJMOTOR Gresini Moto2**	**Kalex**	1:41.265	1:56.656
10	28	(Spain) **Izan Guevara**	**CFMOTO Asterius Aspar Team**	**Kalex**	1:41.758	1:56.174
11	96	(United Kingdom) **Jake Dixon**	**CFMOTO Aspar Team**	**Kalex**	1:41.429	1:54.282
12	35	(Thailand) **Somkiat Chantra**	**IDEMITSU Honda Team Asia**	**Kalex**	1:41.481	1:55.182
13	12	(Czech Republic) **Filip Salač**	**Elf Marc VDS Racing Team**	**Kalex**	1:41.519	2:00.317
14	7	(Belgium) **Barry Baltus**	**RW-Idrofoglia Racing GP**	**Kalex**	1:41.523	2:00.010
15	52	(Spain) Jeremy Alcoba	Yamaha VR46 Master Camp Team	Kalex	1:41.529	1:55.869
16	81	(Australia) Senna Agius	Liqui Moly Husqvarna Intact GP	Kalex	1:41.575	1:56.951
17	10	(Brazil) Diogo Moreira	Italtrans Racing Team	Kalex	1:41.591	1:57.995
18	22	(Japan) Ayumu Sasaki	Yamaha VR46 Master Camp Team	Kalex	1:41.678	No time
19	13	(Italy) Celestino Vietti	Red Bull KTM Ajo	Kalex	1:41.703	1:55.434
20	64	(Netherlands) Bo Bendsneyder	Pertamina Mandalika GAS UP Team	Kalex	1:41.758	1:56.174
21	14	(Italy) Tony Arbolino	Elf Marc VDS Racing Team	Kalex	1:41.799	1:54.190
22	5	(Spain) Jaume Masià	Pertamina Mandalika GAS UP Team	Kalex	1:41.838	1:57.203
23	71	(Italy) Dennis Foggia	Italtrans Racing Team	Kalex	1:42.104	No time
24	34	(Indonesia) Mario Aji	IDEMITSU Honda Team Asia	Kalex	1:42.317	1:56.580
25	11	(Spain) Álex Escrig	KLINT Forward Factory Team	Forward Racing	1:42.330	1:56.396
26	53	(Turkey) Deniz Öncü	Red Bull KTM Ajo	Kalex	1:42.468	1:56.322
27	15	(South Africa) Darryn Binder	Liqui Moly Husqvarna Intact GP	Kalex	1:42.479	1:56.693
28	75	(Spain) Matteo Ferrari	QJMOTOR Gresini Moto2	Kalex	1:42.532	1:59.015
29	20	(Andorra) Xavi Cardelús	Fantic Racing	Kalex	1:42.661	1:56.613
30	9	(Spain) Jorge Navarro	KLINT Forward Factory Team	Forward Racing	1:43.052	1:57.798
31	43	(Spain) Xavier Artigas	KLINT Forward Factory Team	Forward Racing	1:43.589	1:58.776
OFFICIAL MOTO2 PRACTICE TIMES REPORT

=== Moto3 ===
==== Free practice ====
Fastest session lap

Pos.	No.	Biker	Team	Constructor	
Pos.	No.	Biker	Team	Constructor	Time results
1	80	(Colombia) David Alonso	CFMOTO Gaviota Aspar Team	CFMoto	**1:44.590**
2	64	(Spain) David Muñoz	BOE Motorsports	KTM	1:45.669
3	31	(Spain) Adrián Fernández	Leopard Racing	Honda	1:45.919
4	66	(Australia) Joel Kelso	BOE Motorsports	KTM	1:45.970
5	48	(Spain) Iván Ortolá	MT Helmets - MSI	KTM	1:45.979
6	36	(Spain) Ángel Piqueras	Leopard Racing	Honda	1:46.240
7	95	(Netherlands) Collin Veijer	Liqui Moly Husqvarna Intact GP	Husqvarna	1:46.258
8	6	(Japan) Ryusei Yamanaka	MT Helmets - MSI	KTM	1:46.364
9	12	(Australia) Jacob Roulstone	Red Bull GASGAS Tech3	Gas Gas	1:46.433
10	54	(Italy) Riccardo Rossi	CIP Green Power	KTM	1:46.524
11	10	(Italy) Nicola Carraro	LEVELUP - MTA	KTM	1:46.594
12	96	(Spain) Daniel Holgado	Red Bull GASGAS Tech3	Gas Gas	1:46.615
13	19	(United Kingdom) Scott Ogden	MLav Racing	Honda	1:46.676
14	24	(Japan) Tatsuki Suzuki	Liqui Moly Husqvarna Intact GP	Husqvarna	1:46.712
15	70	(United Kingdom) Joshua Whatley	MLav Racing	Honda	1:46.814
16	82	(Italy) Stefano Nepa	LEVELUP - MTA	KTM	1:46.895
17	78	(Spain) Joel Esteban	CFMOTO Gaviota Aspar Team	CFMoto	1:46.994
18	7	(Italy) Filippo Farioli	SIC58 Squadra Corse	Honda	1:47.091
19	22	(Spain) David Almansa	Rivacold Snipers Team	Honda	1:47.138
20	85	(Spain) Xabi Zurutuza	Red Bull KTM Ajo	KTM	1:47.221
21	18	(Italy) Matteo Bertelle	Rivacold Snipers Team	Honda	1:47.368
22	72	(Japan) Taiyo Furusato	Honda Team Asia	Honda	1:47.442
23	58	(Italy) Luca Lunetta	SIC58 Squadra Corse	Honda	1:47.583
24	55	(Switzerland) Noah Dettwiler	CIP Green Power	KTM	1:48.143
25	5	(Thailand) Tatchakorn Buasri	Honda Team Asia	Honda	1:48.268
NC	99	(Spain) José Antonio Rueda	Red Bull KTM Ajo	KTM	No time
OFFICIAL MOTO3 FREE PRACTICE TIMES REPORT

==== Practice ====
The top fourteen riders (written in bold) qualified for Q2.

Fastest session lap

Pos.	No.	Biker	Team	Constructor	Free practice times	
Pos.	No.	Biker	Team	Constructor	P1	P2
1	80	(Colombia) **David Alonso**	**CFMOTO Gaviota Aspar Team**	**CFMoto**	**1:43.710**	**1:56.619**
2	12	(Australia) **Jacob Roulstone**	**Red Bull GASGAS Tech3**	**Gas Gas**	1:44.679	2:02.139
3	95	(Netherlands) **Collin Veijer**	**Liqui Moly Husqvarna Intact GP**	**Husqvarna**	1:44.762	1:59.432
4	96	(Spain) **Daniel Holgado**	**Red Bull GASGAS Tech3**	**Gas Gas**	1:44.892	1:59.949
5	22	(Spain) **David Almansa**	**Rivacold Snipers Team**	**Honda**	1:45.122	No time
6	66	(Australia) **Joel Kelso**	**BOE Motorsports**	**KTM**	1:45.158	2:00.805
7	48	(Spain) **Iván Ortolá**	**MT Helmets - MSI**	**KTM**	1:45.163	1:59.624
8	54	(Italy) **Riccardo Rossi**	**CIP Green Power**	**KTM**	1:45.178	1:58.696
9	64	(Spain) **David Muñoz**	**BOE Motorsports**	**KTM**	1:45.197	1:59.132
10	82	(Italy) **Stefano Nepa**	**LEVELUP - MTA**	**KTM**	1:45.297	1:58.258
11	24	(Japan) **Tatsuki Suzuki**	**Liqui Moly Husqvarna Intact GP**	**Husqvarna**	1:45.333	1:59.569
12	6	(Japan) **Ryusei Yamanaka**	**MT Helmets - MSI**	**KTM**	1:45.474	1:58.685
13	78	(Spain) **Joel Esteban**	**CFMOTO Gaviota Aspar Team**	**CFMoto**	1:45.493	1:56.715
14	19	(United Kingdom) **Scott Ogden**	**MLav Racing**	**Honda**	1:45.566	1:57.731
15	18	(Italy) Matteo Bertelle	Rivacold Snipers Team	Honda	1:45.595	1:57.666
16	72	(Japan) Taiyo Furusato	Honda Team Asia	Honda	1:45.779	1:59.465
17	10	(Italy) Nicola Carraro	LEVELUP - MTA	KTM	1:45.825	1:58.596
18	31	(Spain) Adrián Fernández	Leopard Racing	Honda	1:45.903	1:57.540
19	36	(Spain) Ángel Piqueras	Leopard Racing	Honda	1:45.931	1:57.007
20	58	(Italy) Luca Lunetta	SIC58 Squadra Corse	Honda	1:45.967	1:58.180
21	7	(Italy) Filippo Farioli	SIC58 Squadra Corse	Honda	1:46.168	1:58.958
22	70	(United Kingdom) Joshua Whatley	MLav Racing	Honda	1:46.242	1:58.643
23	55	(Switzerland) Noah Dettwiler	CIP Green Power	KTM	1:46.317	1:57.833
24	85	(Spain) Xabi Zurutuza	Red Bull KTM Ajo	KTM	1:46.708	1:57.703
25	5	(Thailand) Tatchakorn Buasri	Honda Team Asia	Honda	1:47.391	2:00.093
NC	21	(Spain) Vicente Pérez	Red Bull KTM Ajo	KTM	No time	1:58.301
OFFICIAL MOTO3 COMBINED PRACTICE TIMES REPORT

== Qualifying ==
=== MotoGP ===
Fastest session lap

Pos.	No.	Biker	Team	Constructor	Qualifying times		Final grid	Row
Pos.	No.	Biker	Team	Constructor	Q1	Q2	Final grid	Row
1	93	(Spain) Marc Márquez	Gresini Racing MotoGP	Ducati	Qualified in Q2	1:46.773	1	1
2	72	(Italy) Marco Bezzecchi	Pertamina Enduro VR46 MotoGP Team	Ducati	Qualified in Q2	1:47.044	2	1
3	89	(Spain) Jorge Martín	Prima Pramac Racing	Ducati	Qualified in Q2	1:47.381	3	1
4	33	(South Africa) Brad Binder	Red Bull KTM Factory Racing	KTM	1:47.730	1:47.949	4	2
5	49	(Italy) Fabio Di Giannantonio	Pertamina Enduro VR46 MotoGP Team	Ducati	Qualified in Q2	1:47.778	5	2
6	73	(Spain) Álex Márquez	Gresini Racing MotoGP	Ducati	Qualified in Q2	1:47.840	6	2
7	1	(Italy) Francesco Bagnaia	Ducati Lenovo Team	Ducati	Qualified in Q2	1:47.962	7	3
8	21	(Italy) Franco Morbidelli	Prima Pramac Racing	Ducati	1:47.887	1:48.116	8	3
9	23	(Italy) Enea Bastianini	Ducati Lenovo Team	Ducati	Qualified in Q2	1:48.362	9	3
10	31	(Spain) Pedro Acosta	Red Bull GASGAS Tech3	KTM	Qualified in Q2	1:48.528	10	4
11	12	(Spain) Maverick Viñales	Aprilia Racing	Aprilia	Qualified in Q2	1:48.595	11	4
12	41	(Spain) Aleix Espargaró	Aprilia Racing	Aprilia	Qualified in Q2	1:49.417	12	4
13	5	(France) Johann Zarco	CASTROL Honda LCR	Honda	1:48.102	N/A	13	5
14	88	(Portugal) Miguel Oliveira	Trackhouse Racing	Aprilia	1:48.418	N/A	14	5
15	43	(Australia) Jack Miller	Red Bull KTM Factory Racing	KTM	1:48.672	N/A	15	5
16	26	(Spain) Dani Pedrosa	Red Bull KTM Factory Racing	KTM	1:48.699	N/A	16	6
17	25	(Spain) Raúl Fernández	Trackhouse Racing	Aprilia	1:48.728	N/A	17	6
18	37	(Spain) Augusto Fernández	Red Bull GASGAS Tech3	KTM	1:49.229	N/A	18	6
19	6	(Germany) Stefan Bradl	HRC Test Team	Honda	1:49.659	N/A	19	7
20	36	(Spain) Joan Mir	Repsol Honda Team	Honda	1:49.765	N/A	20	7
21	32	(Italy) Lorenzo Savadori	Aprilia Racing	Aprilia	1:49.860	N/A	21	7
22	10	(Italy) Luca Marini	Repsol Honda Team	Honda	1:49.978	N/A	22	8
23	20	(France) Fabio Quartararo	Monster Energy Yamaha MotoGP	Yamaha	1:50.100	N/A	23	8
24	30	(Japan) Takaaki Nakagami	IDEMITSU Honda LCR	Honda	1:50.245	N/A	24	8
25	42	(Spain) Álex Rins	Monster Energy Yamaha MotoGP	Yamaha	1:50.302	N/A	25	9
OFFICIAL MOTOGP QUALIFYING TIMES REPORT

=== Moto2 ===
Fastest session lap

Pos.	No.	Biker	Team	Constructor	Qualifying times		Final grid	Row
Pos.	No.	Biker	Team	Constructor	P1	P2	Final grid	Row
1	54	(Spain) Fermin Aldeguer	Beta Tools SpeedUp	Boscoscuro	Qualified in Q2	1:40.673	1	1
2	75	(Spain) Albert Arenas	QJMOTOR Gresini Moto2	Kalex	Qualified in Q2	1:41.111	2	1
3	96	(United Kingdom) Jake Dixon	CFMOTO Aspar Team	Kalex	Qualified in Q2	1:41.466	3	1
4	18	(Spain) Manuel González	QJMOTOR Gresini Moto2	Kalex	Qualified in Q2	1:41.554	4	2
5	10	(Brazil) Diogo Moreira	Italtrans Racing Team	Kalex	1:42.380	1:41.657	5	2
6	3	(Spain) Sergio García	MT Helmets - MSI	Boscoscuro	Qualified in Q2	1:41.706	6	2
7	13	(Italy) Celestino Vietti	Red Bull KTM Ajo	Kalex	1:42.318	1:41.741	7	3
8	14	(Italy) Tony Arbolino	Elf Marc VDS Racing Team	Kalex	1:41.961	1:41.759	8	3
9	52	(Spain) Jeremy Alcoba	Yamaha VR46 Master Camp Team	Kalex	1:42.405	1:41.771	9	3
10	24	(Spain) Marcos Ramírez	OnlyFans American Racing Team	Kalex	Qualified in Q2	1:41.788	10	4
11	16	(United States) Joe Roberts	OnlyFans American Racing Team	Kalex	Qualified in Q2	1:41.799	11	4
12	35	(Thailand) Somkiat Chantra	IDEMITSU Honda Team Asia	Kalex	Qualified in Q2	1:41.889	12	4
13	7	(Belgium) Barry Baltus	RW-Idrofoglia Racing GP	Kalex	Qualified in Q2	1:41.973	13	5
14	12	(Czech Republic) Filip Salač	Elf Marc VDS Racing Team	Kalex	Qualified in Q2	1:42.245	14	5
15	28	(Spain) Izan Guevara	CFMOTO Asterius Aspar Team	Kalex	Qualified in Q2	1:42.262	15	5
16	21	(Spain) Alonso López	Beta Tools SpeedUp	Boscoscuro	Qualified in Q2	1:42.347	16	6
17	79	(Japan) Ai Ogura	MT Helmets - MSI	Boscoscuro	Qualified in Q2	1:42.705	17	6
18	84	(Netherlands) Zonta van den Goorbergh	RW-Idrofoglia Racing GP	Kalex	N/A	N/A	18	6
19	81	(Australia) Senna Agius	Liqui Moly Husqvarna Intact GP	Kalex	1:42.416	N/A	19	7
20	64	(Netherlands) Bo Bendsneyder	Pertamina Mandalika GAS UP Team	Kalex	1:42.458	N/A	20	7
21	15	(South Africa) Darryn Binder	Liqui Moly Husqvarna Intact GP	Kalex	1:42.542	N/A	21	7
22	53	(Turkey) Deniz Öncü	Red Bull KTM Ajo	Kalex	1:42.590	N/A	22	8
23	71	(Italy) Dennis Foggia	Italtrans Racing Team	Kalex	1:42.908	N/A	23	8
24	9	(Spain) Jorge Navarro	KLINT Forward Factory Team	Forward Racing	1:42.922	N/A	24	8
25	5	(Spain) Jaume Masià	Pertamina Mandalika GAS UP Team	Kalex	1:43.016	N/A	25	9
26	23	(Italy) Matteo Ferrari	QJMOTOR Gresini Moto2	Kalex	1:43.090	N/A	26	9
27	34	(Indonesia) Mario Aji	IDEMITSU Honda Team Asia	Kalex	1:43.433	N/A	27	9
28	11	(Spain) Álex Escrig	KLINT Forward Factory Team	Forward Racing	1:43.438	N/A	28	10
29	20	(Andorra) Xavi Cardelús	Fantic Racing	Kalex	1:43.818	N/A	29	10
30	43	(Spain) Xavier Artigas	KLINT Forward Factory Team	Forward Racing	1:45.002	N/A	30	10
31	22	(Japan) Ayumu Sasaki	Yamaha VR46 Master Camp Team	Kalex	1:41.678	N/A	31	11
OFFICIAL MOTO2 QUALIFYING TIMES REPORT

=== Moto3 ===
Fastest session lap

Pos.	No.	Biker	Team	Constructor	Qualifying times		Final grid	Row
Pos.	No.	Biker	Team	Constructor	P1	P2	Final grid	Row
1	80	(Colombia) David Alonso	CFMOTO Gaviota Aspar Team	CFMoto	Qualified in Q2	1:44.954	1	1
2	64	(Spain) David Muñoz	BOE Motorsports	KTM	Qualified in Q2	1:45.174	2	1
3	95	(Netherlands) Collin Veijer	Liqui Moly Husqvarna Intact GP	Husqvarna	Qualified in Q2	1:46.013	3	1
4	66	(Australia) Joel Kelso	BOE Motorsports	KTM	Qualified in Q2	1:46.053	4	2
5	6	(Japan) Ryusei Yamanaka	MT Helmets - MSI	KTM	Qualified in Q2	1:46.152	5	2
6	36	(Spain) Ángel Piqueras	Leopard Racing	Honda	1:47.823	1:46.477	6	2
7	48	(Spain) Iván Ortolá	MT Helmets - MSI	KTM	Qualified in Q2	1:46.495	7	3
8	78	(Spain) Joel Esteban	CFMOTO Valresa Aspar Team	CFMoto	Qualified in Q2	1:46.600	8	3
9	24	(Japan) Tatsuki Suzuki	Liqui Moly Husqvarna Intact GP	Husqvarna	Qualified in Q2	1:46.797	9	3
10	10	(Italy) Nicola Carraro	LEVELUP - MTA	KTM	1:48.064	1:46.963	10	4
11	82	(Italy) Stefano Nepa	LEVELUP - MTA	KTM	Qualified in Q2	1:47.018	11	4
12	31	(Spain) Adrián Fernández	Leopard Racing	Honda	1:48.296	1:47.152	12	4
13	19	(United Kingdom) Scott Ogden	MLav Racing	Honda	Qualified in Q2	1:47.182	13	5
14	54	(Italy) Riccardo Rossi	CIP Green Power	KTM	Qualified in Q2	1:47.366	14	5
15	7	(Italy) Filippo Farioli	SIC58 Squadra Corse	Honda	1:48.249	1:47.561	15	5
16	22	(Spain) David Almansa	Rivacold Snipers Team	Honda	Qualified in Q2	1:47.603	16	6
17	12	(Australia) Jacob Roulstone	Red Bull GASGAS Tech3	Gas Gas	Qualified in Q2	N/A	17	6
18	96	(Spain) Daniel Holgado	Red Bull GASGAS Tech3	Gas Gas	Qualified in Q2	N/A	18	6
19	18	(Italy) Matteo Bertelle	Rivacold Snipers Team	Honda	1:48.406	N/A	19	7
20	58	(Italy) Luca Lunetta	SIC58 Squadra Corse	Honda	1:48.579	N/A	20	7
21	72	(Japan) Taiyo Furusato	Honda Team Asia	Honda	1:48.651	N/A	21	7
22	70	(United Kingdom) Joshua Whatley	MLav Racing	Honda	1:49.203	N/A	22	8
23	55	(Switzerland) Noah Dettwiler	CIP Green Power	KTM	1:49.228	N/A	23	8
24	21	(Spain) Vicente Pérez	Red Bull KTM Ajo	KTM	1:49.523	N/A	24	8
25	5	(Thailand) Tatchakorn Buasri	Honda Team Asia	Honda	1:50.340	N/A	25	9
26	85	(Spain) Xabi Zurutuza	Red Bull KTM Ajo	KTM	1:51.460	N/A	26	9
OFFICIAL MOTO3 QUALIFYING TIMES REPORT

== MotoGP Sprint ==
The MotoGP Sprint was held on 27 April.

Pos.	No.	Rider	Team	Constructor	Laps	Time/Retired	Grid	Points
1	89	(Spain) Jorge Martín	Prima Pramac Racing	Ducati	12	19:52.682	3	12
2	31	(Spain) Pedro Acosta	Red Bull GASGAS Tech3	KTM	12	+2.970	10	9
3	26	(Spain) Dani Pedrosa	Red Bull KTM Factory Racing	KTM	12	+7.102	16	7
4	21	(Italy) Franco Morbidelli	Prima Pramac Racing	Ducati	12	+8.481	8	6
5	20	(France) Fabio Quartararo	Monster Energy Yamaha MotoGP	Yamaha	12	+15.052 (Note: 8-second penalty for low tyre pressure.)	23	5
6	93	(Spain) Marc Márquez	Gresini Racing MotoGP	Ducati	12	+18.131	1	4
7	37	(Spain) Augusto Fernández	Red Bull GASGAS Tech3	KTM	12	+18.278	18	3
8	88	(Portugal) Miguel Oliveira	Trackhouse Racing	Aprilia	12	+18.418	14	2
9	36	(Spain) Joan Mir	Repsol Honda Team	Honda	12	+18.553	20	1
10	30	(Japan) Takaaki Nakagami	IDEMITSU Honda LCR	Honda	12	+21.136	24	
11	5	(France) Johann Zarco	CASTROL Honda LCR	Honda	12	+21.948	13	
12	25	(Spain) Raúl Fernández	Trackhouse Racing	Aprilia	12	+23.882	17	
13	49	(Italy) Fabio Di Giannantonio	Pertamina Enduro VR46 MotoGP Team	Ducati	12	+31.478	5	
14	43	(Australia) Jack Miller	Red Bull KTM Factory Racing	KTM	12	+45.901	15	
15	42	(Spain) Álex Rins	Monster Energy Yamaha MotoGP	Yamaha	12	+1:10.288	25	
16	32	(Italy) Lorenzo Savadori	Aprilia Racing	Aprilia	12	+1:22.979	21	
Ret	6	(Germany) Stefan Bradl	HRC Test Team	Honda	11	Accident	19	
Ret	10	(Italy) Luca Marini	Repsol Honda Team	Honda	11	Accident	22	
Ret	12	(Spain) Maverick Viñales	Aprilia Racing	Aprilia	9	Accident	11	
Ret	72	(Italy) Marco Bezzecchi	Pertamina Enduro VR46 MotoGP Team	Ducati	8	Accident	2	
Ret	23	(Italy) Enea Bastianini	Ducati Lenovo Team	Ducati	8	Accident	9	
Ret	33	(South Africa) Brad Binder	Red Bull KTM Factory Racing	KTM	8	Accident	4	
Ret	73	(Spain) Álex Márquez	Gresini Racing MotoGP	Ducati	8	Accident	6	
Ret	1	(Italy) Francesco Bagnaia	Ducati Lenovo Team	Ducati	2	Collision	7	
Ret	41	(Spain) Aleix Espargaró	Aprilia Racing	Aprilia	0	Accident	12	
Fastest sprint lap: (Spain) Marc Márquez (Ducati) – 1:37.812 (lap 6)
OFFICIAL MOTOGP SPRINT REPORT

== Warm Up ==
=== Warm Up MotoGP ===
Pos.	No.	Biker	Team	Constructor	
Pos.	No.	Biker	Team	Constructor	Time results
1	73	(Spain) Álex Márquez	Gresini Racing MotoGP	Ducati	1:37.943
2	23	(Italy) Enea Bastianini	Ducati Lenovo Team	Ducati	1:38.119
3	43	(Australia) Jack Miller	Red Bull KTM Factory Racing	KTM	1:38.120
4	25	(Spain) Raúl Fernández	Trackhouse Racing	Aprilia	1:38.131
5	89	(Spain) Jorge Martín	Prima Pramac Racing	Ducati	1:38.231
6	1	(Italy) Francesco Bagnaia	Ducati Lenovo Team	Ducati	1:38.253
7	21	(Italy) Franco Morbidelli	Prima Pramac Racing	Ducati	1:38.279
8	20	(France) Fabio Quartararo	Monster Energy Yamaha MotoGP	Yamaha	1:38.294
9	49	(Italy) Fabio Di Giannantonio	Pertamina Enduro VR46 MotoGP Team	Ducati	1:38.406
10	88	(Portugal) Miguel Oliveira	Trackhouse Racing	Aprilia	1:38.474
11	33	(South Africa) Brad Binder	Red Bull KTM Factory Racing	KTM	1:38.517
12	31	(Spain) Pedro Acosta	Red Bull GASGAS Tech3	KTM	1:38.639
13	93	(Spain) Marc Márquez	Gresini Racing MotoGP	Ducati	1:38.771
14	12	(Spain) Maverick Viñales	Aprilia Racing	Aprilia	1:38.860
15	37	(Spain) Augusto Fernández	Red Bull GASGAS Tech3	KTM	1:38.969
16	72	(Italy) Marco Bezzecchi	Pertamina Enduro VR46 MotoGP Team	Ducati	1:38.984
17	30	(Japan) Takaaki Nakagami	IDEMITSU Honda LCR	Honda	1:39.061
18	5	(France) Johann Zarco	CASTROL Honda LCR	Honda	1:39.239
19	26	(Spain) Dani Pedrosa	Red Bull KTM Factory Racing	KTM	1:39.443
20	36	(Spain) Joan Mir	Repsol Honda Team	Honda	1:39.462
21	10	(Italy) Luca Marini	Repsol Honda Team	Honda	1:39.720
22	42	(Spain) Álex Rins	Monster Energy Yamaha MotoGP	Yamaha	1:39.815
23	6	(Germany) Stefan Bradl	HRC Test Team	Honda	1:40.109
24	41	(Spain) Aleix Espargaró	Aprilia Racing	Aprilia	1:40.262
25	32	(Italy) Lorenzo Savadori	Aprilia Racing	Aprilia	1:40.377
OFFICIAL MOTOGP WARM UP TIMES REPORT

== Race ==
=== MotoGP ===
Pos.	No.	Rider	Team	Constructor	Laps	Time/Retired	Grid	Points
1	1	(Italy) Francesco Bagnaia	Ducati Lenovo Team	Ducati	25	40:58.053	7	25
2	93	(Spain) Marc Márquez	Gresini Racing MotoGP	Ducati	25	+0.372	1	20
3	72	(Italy) Marco Bezzecchi	Pertamina Enduro VR46 MotoGP Team	Ducati	25	+3.903	2	16
4	73	(Spain) Álex Márquez	Gresini Racing MotoGP	Ducati	25	+7.205	6	13
5	23	(Italy) Enea Bastianini	Ducati Lenovo Team	Ducati	25	+7.253	9	11
6	33	(South Africa) Brad Binder	Red Bull KTM Factory Racing	KTM	25	+7.801	4	10
7	49	(Italy) Fabio Di Giannantonio	Pertamina Enduro VR46 MotoGP Team	Ducati	25	+10.063	5	9
8	88	(Portugal) Miguel Oliveira	Trackhouse Racing	Aprilia	25	+10.979	14	8
9	12	(Spain) Maverick Viñales	Aprilia Racing	Aprilia	25	+11.217	11	7
10	31	(Spain) Pedro Acosta	Red Bull GASGAS Tech3	KTM	25	+20.762	10	6
11	25	(Spain) Raúl Fernández	Trackhouse Racing	Aprilia	25	+23.508	17	5
12	36	(Spain) Joan Mir	Repsol Honda Team	Honda	25	+23.584	20	4
13	42	(Spain) Álex Rins	Monster Energy Yamaha MotoGP	Yamaha	25	+28.452	25	3
14	30	(Japan) Takaaki Nakagami	IDEMITSU Honda LCR	Honda	25	+29.049	24	2
15	20	(France) Fabio Quartararo	Monster Energy Yamaha MotoGP	Yamaha	25	+32.015	23	1
16	6	(Germany) Stefan Bradl	HRC Test Team	Honda	25	+41.433	19	
17	10	(Italy) Luca Marini	Repsol Honda Team	Honda	25	+43.323	22	
Ret	37	(Spain) Augusto Fernández	Red Bull GASGAS Tech3	KTM	19	Retired	18	
Ret	43	(Australia) Jack Miller	Red Bull KTM Factory Racing	KTM	17	Collision	15	
Ret	21	(Italy) Franco Morbidelli	Prima Pramac Racing	Ducati	17	Collision	8	
Ret	32	(Italy) Lorenzo Savadori	Aprilia Racing	Aprilia	11	Retired	21	
Ret	89	(Spain) Jorge Martín	Prima Pramac Racing	Ducati	10	Accident	3	
Ret	5	(France) Johann Zarco	CASTROL Honda LCR	Honda	9	Collision	13	
Ret	41	(Spain) Aleix Espargaró	Aprilia Racing	Aprilia	9	Collision	12	
Ret	26	(Spain) Dani Pedrosa	Red Bull KTM Factory Racing	KTM	3	Accident	16	
Fastest lap: (Italy) Francesco Bagnaia (Ducati) – 1:37.449 (lap 23)
OFFICIAL MOTOGP RACE REPORT

=== Moto2 ===
Pos.	No.	Rider	Team	Manufacturer	Laps	Time/Retired	Grid	Points
1	54	(Spain) Fermin Aldeguer	Beta Tools SpeedUp	Boscoscuro	21	35:36.316	1	25
2	16	(United States) Joe Roberts	OnlyFans American Racing Team	Kalex	21	+1.287	11	20
3	18	(Spain) Manuel González	QJMOTOR Gresini Moto2	Kalex	21	+1.568	4	16
4	3	(Spain) Sergio García	MT Helmets - MSI	Boscoscuro	21	+6.226	6	13
5	75	(Spain) Albert Arenas	QJMOTOR Gresini Moto2	Kalex	21	+8.059	2	11
6	79	(Japan) Ai Ogura	MT Helmets - MSI	Boscoscuro	21	+12.490	17	10
7	14	(Italy) Tony Arbolino	Elf Marc VDS Racing Team	Kalex	21	+13.346	8	9
8	52	(Spain) Jeremy Alcoba	Yamaha VR46 Master Camp Team	Kalex	21	+13.489	9	8
9	13	(Italy) Celestino Vietti	Red Bull KTM Ajo	Kalex	21	+14.508	7	7
10	35	(Thailand) Somkiat Chantra	IDEMITSU Honda Team Asia	Kalex	21	+19.693	12	6
11	12	(Czech Republic) Filip Salač	Elf Marc VDS Racing Team	Kalex	21	+20.045	14	5
12	28	(Spain) Izan Guevara	CFMOTO Asterius Aspar Team	Kalex	21	+21.779	15	4
13	84	(Netherlands) Zonta van den Goorbergh	RW-Idrofoglia Racing GP	Kalex	21	+27.933	18	3
14	53	(Turkey) Deniz Öncü	Red Bull KTM Ajo	Kalex	21	+32.146	22	2
15	23	(Italy) Matteo Ferrari	QJMOTOR Gresini Moto2	Kalex	21	+41.158	26	1
16	34	(Indonesia) Mario Aji	IDEMITSU Honda Team Asia	Kalex	21	+41.953	27	
17	20	(Andorra) Xavi Cardelús	Fantic Racing	Kalex	21	+42.591	29	
18	9	(Spain) Jorge Navarro	KLINT Forward Factory Team	Forward Racing	21	+46.933	24	
19	15	(South Africa) Darryn Binder	Liqui Moly Husqvarna Intact GP	Kalex	20	+1 lap	21	
20	43	(Spain) Xavier Artigas	KLINT Forward Factory Team	Forward Racing	17	+4 Laps	30	
NC	5	(Spain) Jaume Masià	Pertamina Mandalika GAS UP Team	Kalex	20	Crashed out	25	
NC	96	(United Kingdom) Jake Dixon	CFMOTO Aspar Team	Kalex	20	Ret. after crash	3	
NC	21	(Spain) Alonso López	Beta Tools SpeedUp	Boscoscuro	17	Crashed out	16	
NC	24	(Spain) Marcos Ramírez	OnlyFans American Racing Team	Kalex	15	Crashed out	10	
NC	11	(Spain) Álex Escrig	KLINT Forward Factory Team	Forward Racing	13	Crashed out	28	
NC	10	(Brazil) Diogo Moreira	Italtrans Racing Team	Kalex	11	Crashed out	5	
NC	7	(Belgium) Barry Baltus	RW-Idrofoglia Racing GP	Kalex	6	Crashed out	13	
NC	71	(Italy) Dennis Foggia	Italtrans Racing Team	Kalex	4	Crashed out	23	
NC	81	(Australia) Senna Agius	Liqui Moly Husqvarna Intact GP	Kalex	1	Crashed out	19	
NC	64	(Netherlands) Bo Bendsneyder	Pertamina Mandalika GAS UP Team	Kalex	1	Crashed out	20	
DNS	22	(Japan) Ayumu Sasaki	Yamaha VR46 Master Camp Team	Kalex	0	Injury	31	
Fastest lap: (United States) Joe Roberts (Kalex) - 1:41.020 (lap 9)
OFFICIAL MOTO2 RACE REPORT

=== Moto3 ===
Pos.	No.	Rider	Team	Constructor	Laps	Time/Retired	Grid	Points
1	95	(Netherlands) Collin Veijer	Liqui Moly Husqvarna Intact GP	Husqvarna	19	33:29.725	3	25
2	64	(Spain) David Muñoz	BOE Motorsports	KTM	19	+0.045	2	20
3	48	(Spain) Iván Ortolá	MT Helmets - MSI	KTM	19	+0.871	7	16
4	6	(Japan) Ryusei Yamanaka	MT Helmets - MSI	KTM	19	+4.849	5	13
5	66	(Australia) Joel Kelso	BOE Motorsports	KTM	19	+10.178	4	11
6	31	(Spain) Adrián Fernández	Leopard Racing	Honda	19	+10.353	12	10
7	96	(Spain) Daniel Holgado	Red Bull GASGAS Tech3	Gas Gas	19	+10.400	18	9
8	10	(Italy) Nicola Carraro	LEVELUP - MTA	KTM	19	+10.647	10	8
9	82	(Italy) Stefano Nepa	LEVELUP - MTA	KTM	19	+11.400	11	7
10	36	(Spain) Ángel Piqueras	Leopard Racing	Honda	19	+14.885	6	6
11	80	(Colombia) David Alonso	CFMOTO Gaviota Aspar Team	CFMoto	19	+19.152	1	5
12	12	(Australia) Jacob Roulstone	Red Bull GASGAS Tech3	Gas Gas	19	+19.921	17	4
13	7	(Italy) Filippo Farioli	SIC58 Squadra Corse	Honda	19	+20.423	15	3
14	18	(Italy) Matteo Bertelle	Rivacold Snipers Team	Honda	19	+20.541	19	2
15	22	(Spain) David Almansa	Rivacold Snipers Team	Honda	19	+20.662	16	1
16	21	(Spain) Vicente Pérez	Red Bull KTM Ajo	KTM	19	+22.382	24	
17	72	(Japan) Taiyo Furusato	Honda Team Asia	Honda	19	+22.882	21	
18	54	(Italy) Riccardo Rossi	CIP Green Power	KTM	19	+23.186	14	
19	19	(United Kingdom) Scott Ogden	MLav Racing	Honda	19	+25.549	13	
20	58	(Italy) Luca Lunetta	SIC58 Squadra Corse	Honda	19	+32.270	20	
21	55	(Switzerland) Noah Dettwiler	CIP Green Power	KTM	19	+32.483	23	
22	85	(Spain) Xabi Zurutuza	Red Bull KTM Ajo	KTM	19	+45.346	26	
23	70	(United Kingdom) Joshua Whatley	MLav Racing	Honda	19	+45.842	22	
24	5	(Thailand) Tatchakorn Buasri	Honda Team Asia	Honda	19	+46.845	25	
25	24	(Japan) Tatsuki Suzuki	Liqui Moly Husqvarna Intact GP	Husqvarna	18	+1 Lap	9	
NC	78	(Spain) Joel Esteban	CFMOTO Valresa Aspar Team	CFMoto	18	Crashed out	8	
Fastest lap: (Japan) Ryusei Yamanaka (KTM) - 1:45.105 (lap 8)
OFFICIAL MOTO3 RACE REPORT

== Championship standings after the race ==
Below are the standings for the top five riders, constructors, and teams after the round.

=== MotoGP ===
Riders' Championship standings

	Pos.	Rider	Points
	1	(Spain) Jorge Martín	92
3	2	(Italy) Francesco Bagnaia	75
1	3	(Italy) Enea Bastianini	70
	4	(Spain) Pedro Acosta	69
2	5	(Spain) Maverick Viñales	63

Constructors' Championship standings

Pos.	Constructor	Points
1	(Italy) Ducati	133
2	(Austria) KTM	95
3	(Italy) Aprilia	82
4	(Japan) Yamaha	27
5	(Japan) Honda	13

Teams' Championship standings

	Pos.	Team	Points
	1	(Italy) Ducati Lenovo Team	145
	2	(Italy) Aprilia Racing	102
	3	(Italy) Prima Pramac Racing	98
2	4	(Italy) Gresini Racing MotoGP	87
1	5	(Austria) Red Bull KTM Factory Racing	81

=== Moto2 ===
Riders' Championship standings

	Pos.	Rider	Points
1	1	(United States) Joe Roberts	69
1	2	(Spain) Sergio García	64
4	3	(Spain) Fermín Aldeguer	54
2	4	(Spain) Manuel González	46
	5	(Japan) Ai Ogura	43

Constructors' Championship standings

	Pos.	Constructor	Points
1	1	(Italy) Boscoscuro	88
1	2	(Germany) Kalex	85

Teams' Championship standings

Pos.	Team	Points
1	(Spain) MT Helmets – MSi	107
2	(United States) OnlyFans American Racing Team	97
3	(Italy) Beta Tools Speed Up	92
4	(Italy) QJmotor Gresini Moto2	77
5	(Italy) Fantic Racing	38

=== Moto3 ===
Riders' Championship standings

	Pos.	Rider	Points
	1	(Spain) Daniel Holgado	74
	2	(Colombia) David Alonso	68
3	3	(Netherlands) Collin Veijer	46
	4	(Spain) Iván Ortolá	39
2	5	(Australia) Joel Kelso	39

Constructors' Championship standings

	Pos.	Constructor	Points
	1	(Spain) Gas Gas	74
	2	(China) CFMoto	68
	3	(Austria) KTM	66
1	4	(Sweden) Husqvarna	56
1	5	(Japan) Honda	48

Teams' Championship standings

Pos.	Team	Points
1	(France) Red Bull GasGas Tech3	97
2	(Spain) CFMoto Gaviota Aspar Team	88
3	(Spain) Boé Motorsports	77
4	(Germany) Liqui Moly Husqvarna Intact GP	68
5	(Spain) MT Helmets – MSi	65

== Notes ==
Previous race: 2024 Grand Prix of the Americas	FIM Grand Prix World Championship; 2024 season	Next race: 2024 French Grand Prix
Previous race: 2023 Spanish Grand Prix	Spanish motorcycle Grand Prix	Next race: 2025 Spanish Grand Prix
