= 2024 Austrian motorcycle Grand Prix =

Motorcycle races in Spielberg

(Austria) 2024 Austrian Grand Prix
Race details
- Race 11 of 20 races in the 2024 Grand Prix motorcycle racing season
- Date: 17–18 August 2024
- Official name: Motorrad Grand Prix von Österreich
- Location: Red Bull Ring; Spielberg, Styria, Austria
- Course: Permanent racing facility; 4.348 km (2.702 mi)

MotoGP
Pole position
Rider	(Spain) Jorge Martín	Ducati
Time	1:27.748	
Fastest lap
Rider	(Italy) Francesco Bagnaia	Ducati
Time	1:29.519 on lap 8	
Podium
First	(Italy) Francesco Bagnaia	Ducati
Second	(Spain) Jorge Martín	Ducati
Third	(Italy) Enea Bastianini	Ducati

Moto2
Pole position
Rider	(Italy) Celestino Vietti	Kalex
Time	1:33.855	
Fastest lap
Rider	(Italy) Celestino Vietti	Kalex
Time	1:34.254 on lap 6	
Podium
First	(Italy) Celestino Vietti	Kalex
Second	(Spain) Alonso López	Boscoscuro
Third	(United Kingdom) Jake Dixon	Kalex

Moto3
Pole position
Rider	(Spain) Iván Ortolá	KTM
Time	1:40.057	
Fastest lap
Rider	(Japan) Tatsuki Suzuki	Husqvarna
Time	1:40.092 on lap 10	
Podium
First	(Colombia) David Alonso	CFMoto
Second	(Spain) David Muñoz	KTM
Third	(Spain) Daniel Holgado	Gas Gas

MotoE Race 1
Pole position
Rider	(Spain) Oscar Gutiérrez	Ducati
Time	1:37.970	
Fastest lap
Rider	(Spain) Oscar Gutiérrez	Ducati
Time	1:38.284 on lap 4	
Podium
First	(Spain) Oscar Gutiérrez	Ducati
Second	(Spain) Héctor Garzó	Ducati
Third	(Italy) Mattia Casadei	Ducati

MotoE Race 2
Pole position
Rider	(Spain) Oscar Gutiérrez	Ducati
Time	1:37.970	
Fastest lap
Rider	(Italy) Mattia Casadei	Ducati
Time	1:38.461 on lap 6	
Podium
First	(Spain) Héctor Garzó	Ducati
Second	(Italy) Kevin Zannoni	Ducati
Third	(Italy) Mattia Casadei	Ducati

The 2024 Austrian motorcycle Grand Prix (officially known as the Motorrad Grand Prix von Österreich) was the eleventh round of the 2024 Grand Prix motorcycle racing season and the seventh round of the 2024 MotoE World Championship. All races (except for both MotoE races which were held on 17 August) were held at the Red Bull Ring in Spielberg on 18 August 2024.

== MotoGP Sprint ==
The MotoGP Sprint was held on 17 August.

Pos.	No.	Rider	Team	Constructor	Laps	Time/Retired	Grid	Points
1	1	(Italy) Francesco Bagnaia	Ducati Lenovo Team	Ducati	14	20:59.768	2	12
2	89	(Spain) Jorge Martín	Prima Pramac Racing	Ducati	14	+4.673	1	9
3	41	(Spain) Aleix Espargaró	Aprilia Racing	Aprilia	14	+7.584	4	7
4	23	(Italy) Enea Bastianini	Ducati Lenovo Team	Ducati	14	+9.685	7	6
5	43	(Australia) Jack Miller	Red Bull KTM Factory Racing	KTM	14	+10.421	5	5
6	21	(Italy) Franco Morbidelli	Prima Pramac Racing	Ducati	14	+10.523	8	4
7	33	(South Africa) Brad Binder	Red Bull KTM Factory Racing	KTM	14	+10.941	12	3
8	72	(Italy) Marco Bezzecchi	Pertamina Enduro VR46 Racing Team	Ducati	14	+11.932	9	2
9	44	(Spain) Pol Espargaró	Red Bull KTM Factory Racing	KTM	14	+15.101	10	1
10	31	(Spain) Pedro Acosta	Red Bull GasGas Tech3	KTM	14	+16.611	14	
11	12	(Spain) Maverick Viñales	Aprilia Racing	Aprilia	14	+16.759	6	
12	20	(France) Fabio Quartararo	Monster Energy Yamaha MotoGP Team	Yamaha	14	+17.943	15	
13	88	(Portugal) Miguel Oliveira	Trackhouse Racing	Aprilia	14	+18.304	13	
14	25	(Spain) Raúl Fernández	Trackhouse Racing	Aprilia	14	+19.185	20	
15	5	(France) Johann Zarco	Castrol Honda LCR	Honda	14	+21.330	17	
16	30	(Japan) Takaaki Nakagami	Idemitsu Honda LCR	Honda	14	+22.940	22	
17	10	(Italy) Luca Marini	Repsol Honda Team	Honda	14	+25.830	18	
18	32	(Italy) Lorenzo Savadori	Aprilia Racing	Aprilia	14	+26.622	24	
19	36	(Spain) Joan Mir	Repsol Honda Team	Honda	14	+27.458	19	
20	73	(Spain) Álex Márquez	Gresini Racing MotoGP	Ducati	14	+37.870	11	
Ret	37	(Spain) Augusto Fernández	Red Bull GasGas Tech3	KTM	11	Retired	16	
Ret	93	(Spain) Marc Márquez	Gresini Racing MotoGP	Ducati	10	Accident damage	3	
Ret	42	(Spain) Álex Rins	Monster Energy Yamaha MotoGP Team	Yamaha	10	Retired	21	
Ret	6	(Germany) Stefan Bradl	HRC Test Team	Honda	5	Retired	23	
Fastest lap: (Italy) Francesco Bagnaia (Ducati) – 1:28.782 (lap 2)
OFFICIAL MOTOGP SPRINT REPORT

== Race ==
=== MotoGP ===
Pos.	No.	Rider	Team	Constructor	Laps	Time/Retired	Grid	Points
1	1	(Italy) Francesco Bagnaia	Ducati Lenovo Team	Ducati	28	42:11.173	2	25
2	89	(Spain) Jorge Martín	Prima Pramac Racing	Ducati	28	+3.232	1	20
3	23	(Italy) Enea Bastianini	Ducati Lenovo Team	Ducati	28	+7.357	7	16
4	93	(Spain) Marc Márquez	Gresini Racing MotoGP	Ducati	28	+13.836	3	13
5	33	(South Africa) Brad Binder	Red Bull KTM Factory Racing	KTM	28	+18.620	12	11
6	72	(Italy) Marco Bezzecchi	Pertamina Enduro VR46 Racing Team	Ducati	28	+21.206	9	10
7	12	(Spain) Maverick Viñales	Aprilia Racing	Aprilia	28	+24.322	6	9
8	21	(Italy) Franco Morbidelli	Prima Pramac Racing	Ducati	28	+27.677	8	8
9	41	(Spain) Aleix Espargaró	Aprilia Racing	Aprilia	28	+28.829	4	7
10	73	(Spain) Álex Márquez	Gresini Racing MotoGP	Ducati	28	+30.268	11	6
11	44	(Spain) Pol Espargaró	Red Bull KTM Factory Racing	KTM	28	+30.526	10	5
12	88	(Portugal) Miguel Oliveira	Trackhouse Racing	Aprilia	28	+30.702	13	4
13	31	(Spain) Pedro Acosta	Red Bull GasGas Tech3	KTM	28	+33.736	14	3
14	30	(Japan) Takaaki Nakagami	Idemitsu Honda LCR	Honda	28	+36.310	22	2
15	37	(Spain) Augusto Fernández	Red Bull GasGas Tech3	KTM	28	+36.522	16	1
16	42	(Spain) Álex Rins	Monster Energy Yamaha MotoGP Team	Yamaha	28	+37.571	21	
17	36	(Spain) Joan Mir	Repsol Honda Team	Honda	28	+40.432	19	
18	20	(France) Fabio Quartararo	Monster Energy Yamaha MotoGP Team	Yamaha	28	+43.788	15	
19	43	(Australia) Jack Miller	Red Bull KTM Factory Racing	KTM	28	+44.134	5	
20	32	(Italy) Lorenzo Savadori	Aprilia Racing	Aprilia	28	+44.576	24	
21	5	(France) Johann Zarco	Castrol Honda LCR	Honda	28	+54.126	17	
22	6	(Germany) Stefan Bradl	HRC Test Team	Honda	28	+54.923	23	
Ret	25	(Spain) Raúl Fernández	Trackhouse Racing	Aprilia	27	Retired	20	
Ret	10	(Italy) Luca Marini	Repsol Honda Team	Honda	5	Retired	18	
Fastest lap: (Italy) Francesco Bagnaia (Ducati) – 1:29.519 (lap 8)
OFFICIAL MOTOGP RACE REPORT

== Championship standings after the race ==
Below are the standings for the top five riders, constructors, and teams after the round.

=== MotoGP ===
Riders' Championship standings

	Pos.	Rider	Points
1	1	(Italy) Francesco Bagnaia	275
1	2	(Spain) Jorge Martín	270
1	3	(Italy) Enea Bastianini	214
1	4	(Spain) Marc Márquez	192
	5	(Spain) Maverick Viñales	139

Constructors' Championship standings

Pos.	Constructor	Points
1	(Italy) Ducati	389
2	(Italy) Aprilia	208
3	(Austria) KTM	194
4	(Japan) Yamaha	53
5	(Japan) Honda	28

Teams' Championship standings

Pos.	Team	Points
1	(Italy) Ducati Lenovo Team	489
2	(Italy) Prima Pramac Racing	343
3	(Italy) Gresini Racing MotoGP	290
4	(Italy) Aprilia Racing	252
5	(Italy) Pertamina Enduro VR46 Racing Team	177

=== Moto2 ===
Riders' Championship standings

	Pos.	Rider	Points
	1	(Spain) Sergio García	162
	2	(Japan) Ai Ogura	142
	3	(United States) Joe Roberts	130
1	4	(Spain) Alonso López	120
1	5	(Spain) Fermín Aldeguer	112

Constructors' Championship standings

Pos.	Constructor	Points
1	(Italy) Boscoscuro	237
2	(Germany) Kalex	222
3	(Switzerland) Forward	6

Teams' Championship standings

Pos.	Team	Points
1	(Spain) MT Helmets – MSi	304
2	(Italy) Sync Speed Up	232
3	(United States) OnlyFans American Racing Team	185
4	(Italy) QJmotor Gresini Moto2	147
5	(Spain) CFMoto Inde Aspar Team	119

=== Moto3 ===
Riders' Championship standings

Pos.	Rider	Points
1	(Colombia) David Alonso	224
2	(Spain) Iván Ortolá	153
3	(Spain) Daniel Holgado	149
4	(Netherlands) Collin Veijer	142
5	(Spain) David Muñoz	108

Constructors' Championship standings

Pos.	Constructor	Points
1	(China) CFMoto	224
2	(Austria) KTM	199
3	(Sweden) Husqvarna	159
4	(Spain) Gas Gas	154
5	(Japan) Honda	131

Teams' Championship standings

Pos.	Team	Points
1	(Spain) CFMoto Gaviota Aspar Team	265
2	(Spain) MT Helmets – MSi	238
3	(France) Red Bull GasGas Tech3	195
4	(Germany) Liqui Moly Husqvarna Intact GP	190
5	(Spain) Boé Motorsports	180

=== MotoE ===
Riders' Championship standings

	Pos.	Rider	Points
	1	(Spain) Héctor Garzó	224
	2	(Italy) Mattia Casadei	186
1	3	(Italy) Kevin Zannoni	180
1	4	(Spain) Oscar Gutiérrez	175
	5	(Italy) Alessandro Zaccone	151

Teams' Championship standings

	Pos.	Team	Points
	1	(Germany) Dynavolt Intact GP MotoE	326
1	2	(Spain) Openbank Aspar Team	308
1	3	(France) Tech3 E-Racing	288
1	4	(Monaco) LCR E-Team	266
1	5	(Spain) Axxis – MSi	258

Previous race: 2024 British Grand Prix	FIM Grand Prix World Championship; 2024 season	Next race: 2024 Aragon Grand Prix
Previous race: 2023 Austrian Grand Prix	Austrian motorcycle Grand Prix	Next race: 2025 Austrian Grand Prix
