= CFMoto UForce =

Side-by-side vehicle

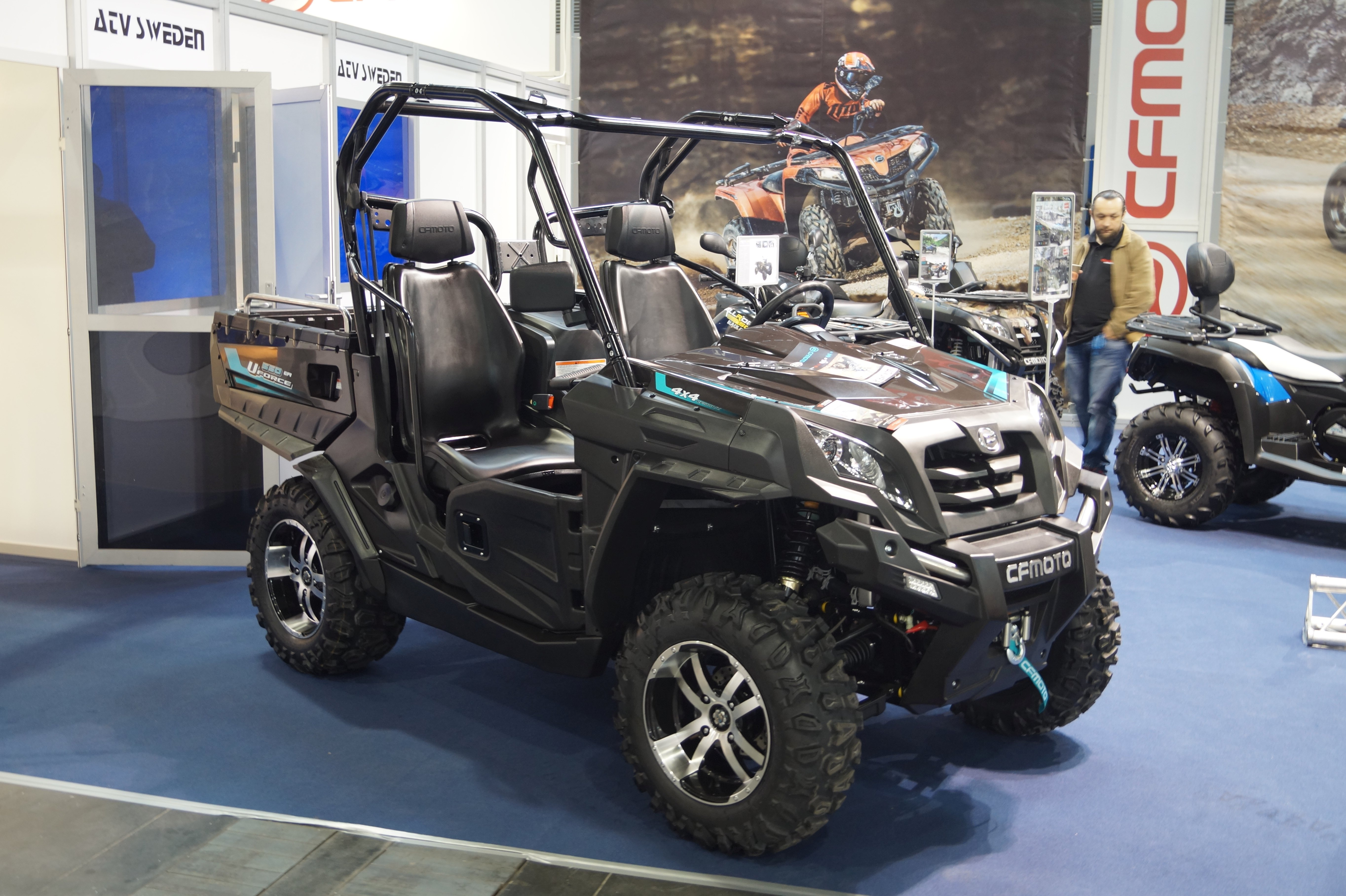

Overview
- Manufacturer: CFMoto
- Production: 2016–present

Body and chassis
- Class: Side-by-side vehicle

The CFMoto UForce is a line of side-by-side vehicles produced by CFMoto since 2016.

== History ==
The UForce entered production in 2016 with the UForce 500 and 800 models. In 2021, CFMoto introduced the UForce 600. In 2022, the company introduced the six-seated UForce 1000 XL. In August 2024, CFMoto introduced the UForce U10 PRO UTV range. In April 2025, the company released the UFORCE U10 Pro and Pro XL Highland.
