= CFMoto =

Chinese vehicle manufacturer

CFMOTO
- Native name: 浙江春风动力股份有限公司
- Type: Public
- Traded as: SSE: 603129
- Industry: Automotive
- Founded: 1989; 37 years ago
- Founder: Lai Guogui (President)
- Headquarters: Hangzhou, Zhejiang, China
- Key people: Lai Minjie (CEO)
- Revenue: RMB 32.4 (2019)
- Net income: RMB 180 Million (2019)
- Divisions: GOES, Zeeho
- Website: www.cfmoto.com/global

Zhejiang Chunfeng Power Co., Ltd., (Note: Chinese: 浙江春风动力股份有限公司) commonly known by its trade name CFMOTO, (Note: Chinese: 春風動力. Stylised in all caps) is a Chinese manufacturer of engines, motorcycles, all-terrain vehicles, quadricycles, quads, and yachts headquartered in Hangzhou, Zhejiang, China.

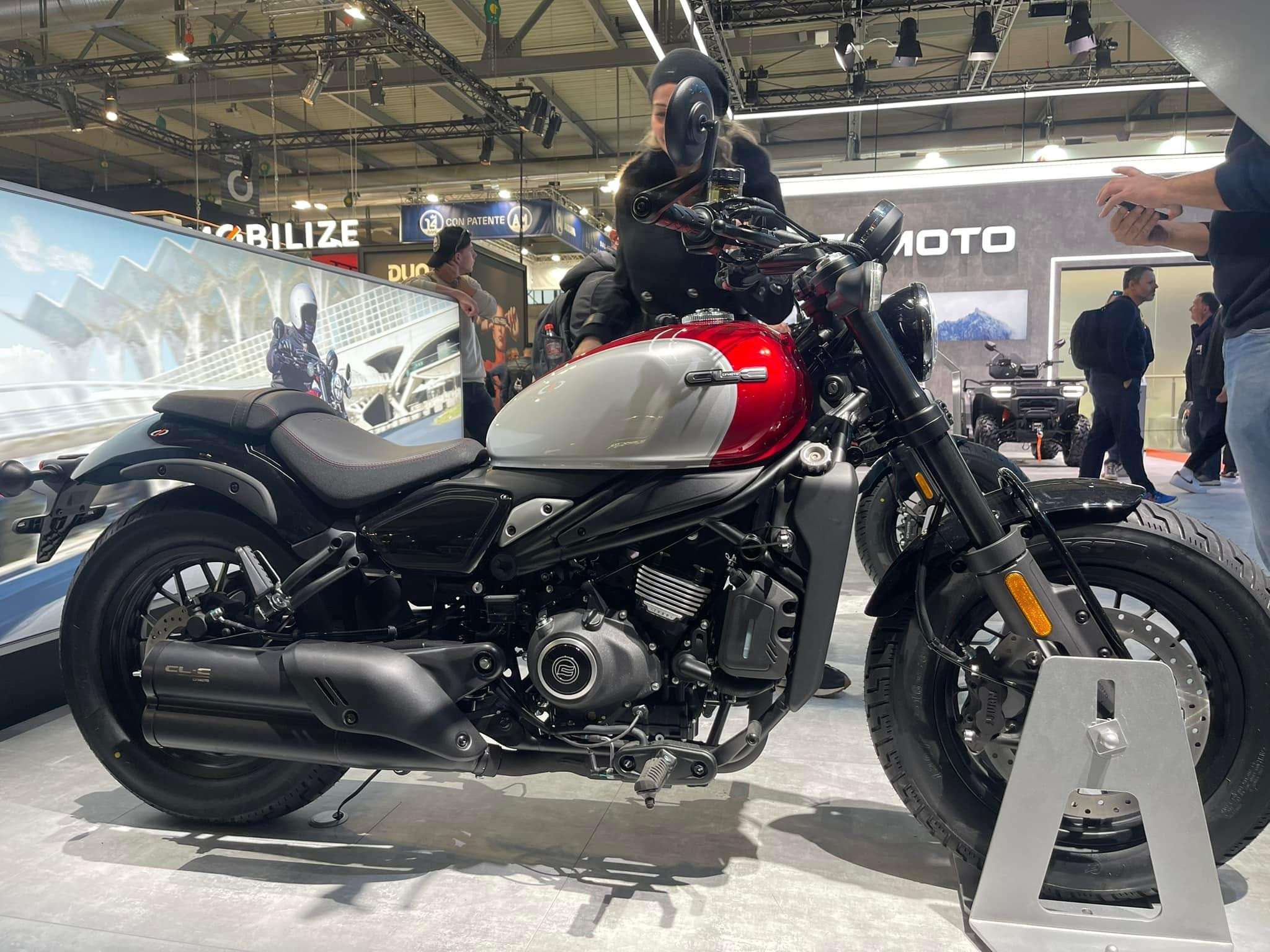
CFMOTO 450 CL-C

The Chunfeng CF650-2 and CF1250J models produced by the company are police vehicles used by public security agencies in many provinces and cities.

== History ==
CFMOTO was established in 1989 by Lai Guoqiang. In 2013, it began to be involved in the construction of high-end yachts.

In 2011, CFMOTO and KTM entered into a commercial partnership. In 2017, the two companies started a joint venture that allows the production and sale of KTM motorcycles in China under the name of "KTMR2R". CFMOTO also assembles the small displacement models on behalf of KTM in its Chinese factories, as well as producing the larger displacement KTM LC8c engines.

Since 2017, CFMOTO has been listed on the Shanghai Stock Exchange as Chunfeng Power with the code 603129.

At the end of 2020, CFMOTO announced a new sub-brand of electric motorcycles, a Zeeho.

== Sales and marketing ==
CFMOTO designs and manufactures 400-1000cc ATVs, 500-1000cc SSVs, 1000cc UTVs, and 125-800cc motorcycles. Its annual production capacity is 800,000 engines and more than 600,000 vehicles distributed in more than 100 countries and distributed by more than 2,000 partners.

== Dealerships ==
CFMOTO has a dealer locator on their website for the US market.

== Racing ==
=== Grand Prix ===
==== Moto2 and Moto3 ====
CFMOTO entered the Moto3 World Championship as a unique constructor using their KTM-based motorcycle.

In 2022, CFMOTO made its debut in the Moto3 class of the Grand Prix motorcycle racing. In fact, two KTM RC250GPs rebranded CFMOTO were lined up by the Prüstel GP team. The riders chosen for the debut season were Spaniards Xavier Artigas and Carlos Tatay. At the Indonesian Grand Prix, Tatay started on pole position and finished in third place, the CFMOTO team's first podium.

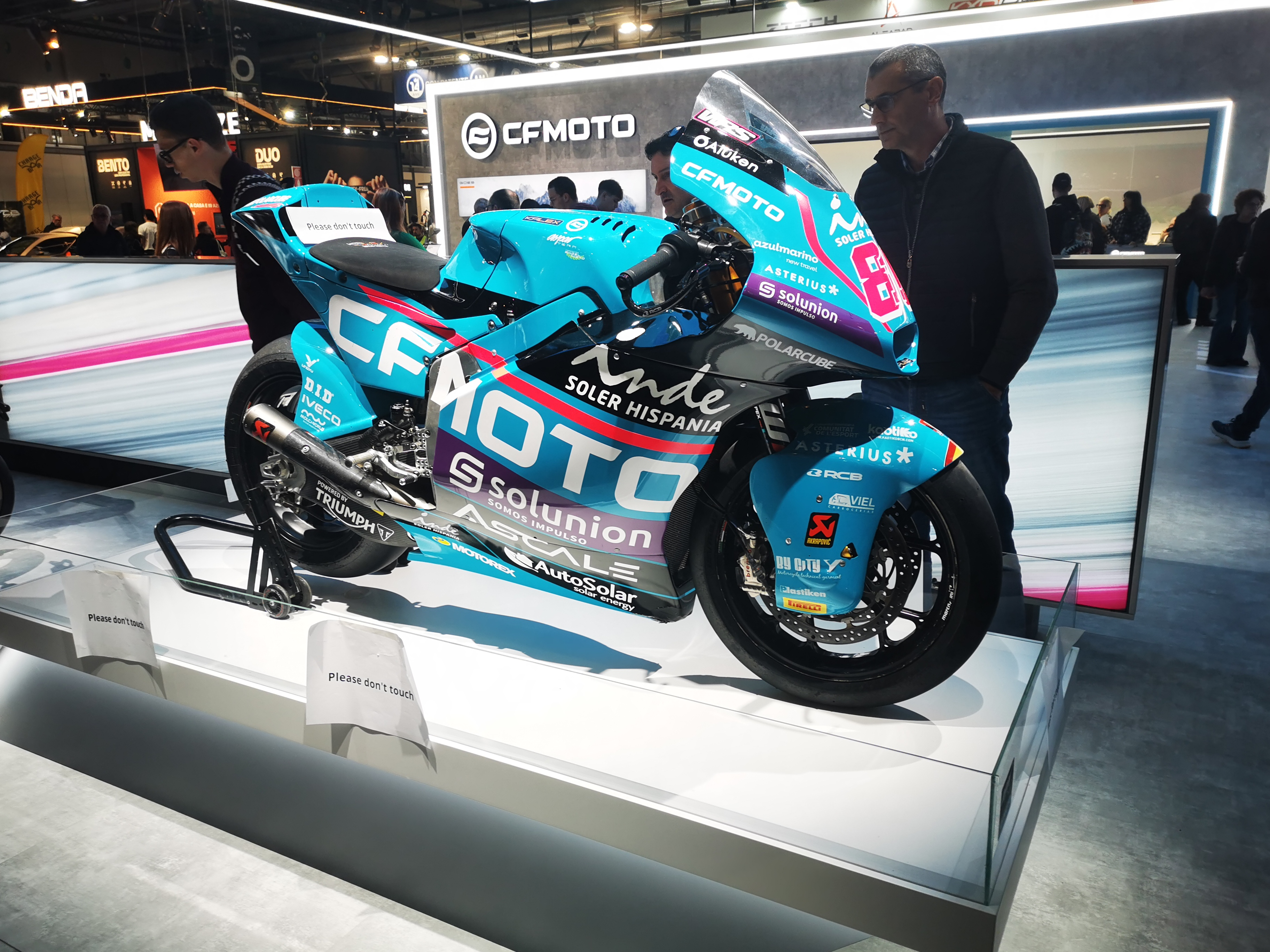
The 2024 Kalex Moto2 used by CFMOTO

CFMOTO and Aspar Team join forces in 2024 to fight for the Moto2 and Moto3 titles. In 2023 CFMOTO achieved two more podiums at the Americas Grand Prix and the Australian Grand Prix. In 2024, the goal is even more ambitious: to fight for victories and podiums with the help of Jake Dixon and Izan Guevara, in Moto2, and David Alonso and Joel Esteban, in Moto3. At the Qatar Grand Prix, David Alonso and the CFMOTO Aspar Team have made history with the first victory in the World Championship for a Chinese manufacturer.

At the end of 2024 season, CFMOTO Aspar Team completes the triple crown. David Alonso was crowned world champion in JapaneseGP. CFMOTO became the first Chinese manufacturer to win the constructors' title in the World Championship. In addition, the CFMOTO Aspar Team has also won the teams' championship with two races to go.

==== Results ====
Year	Team name	Class	No.	Rider	Rounds	Wins	Podiums	Poles	F.laps	Points	Pos.
2022	CFMOTO Prüstel GP	Moto3	43	(Spain) Xavier Artigas	All	0	0	0	0	83	16th
2022	CFMOTO Prüstel GP	Moto3	99	(Spain) Carlos Tatay	All	0	1	1	0	87	15th
2023	CFMOTO Prüstel GP	Moto3	43	(Spain) Xavier Artigas	All	0	1	0	0	77	15th
2023	CFMOTO Prüstel GP	Moto3	66	(Australia) Joel Kelso	1,4-20	0	1	0	0	61	17th
2023	CFMOTO Prüstel GP	Moto3	92	(Spain) David Almansa	2–3	0	0	0	0	0	32nd
2023	CFMOTO Prüstel GP	Moto3	12	(Switzerland) Noah Dettwiler	10	0	0	0	0	0	38th
2024	CFMOTO Aspar Team	Moto2	96	(United Kingdom) Jake Dixon	3-20	2	5	2	1	155	8th
2024	CFMOTO Aspar Team	Moto2	28	(Spain) Izan Guevara	All	0	1	0	0	69	17th
2024	CFMOTO Aspar Team	Moto3	80	(Colombia) David Alonso	All	14	15	7	3	421	1st
2024	CFMOTO Aspar Team	Moto3	78	(Spain) Joel Esteban	1-19	0	0	0	1	45	17th
2024	CFMOTO Aspar Team	Moto3	89	(Spain) Marcos Uriarte	20	0	0	0	0	0	35th
2025	CFMOTO Aspar Team	Moto2	27	(Spain) Daniel Holgado	1-22	2	5	4	3	208	6th
2025	CFMOTO Aspar Team	Moto2	80	(Colombia) David Alonso	1-22	1	5	0	2	153	9th
2025	CFMOTO Aspar Team	Moto3	28	(Spain) Máximo Quiles	3,6-22	3	9	2	0	274	3rd
2025	CFMOTO Aspar Team	Moto3	71	(Italy) Dennis Foggia	1-18,22	0	1	0	0	96	14th
2025	CFMOTO Aspar Team	Moto3	34	(Austria) Jakob Rosenthaler	1-2	0	0	0	0	0	35th
2025	CFMOTO Aspar Team	Moto3	78	(Spain) Joel Esteban	4-5,19-20	0	0	0	0	33	19th

Key
Regular rider
Replacement rider
Wildcard rider

== Off Road ==
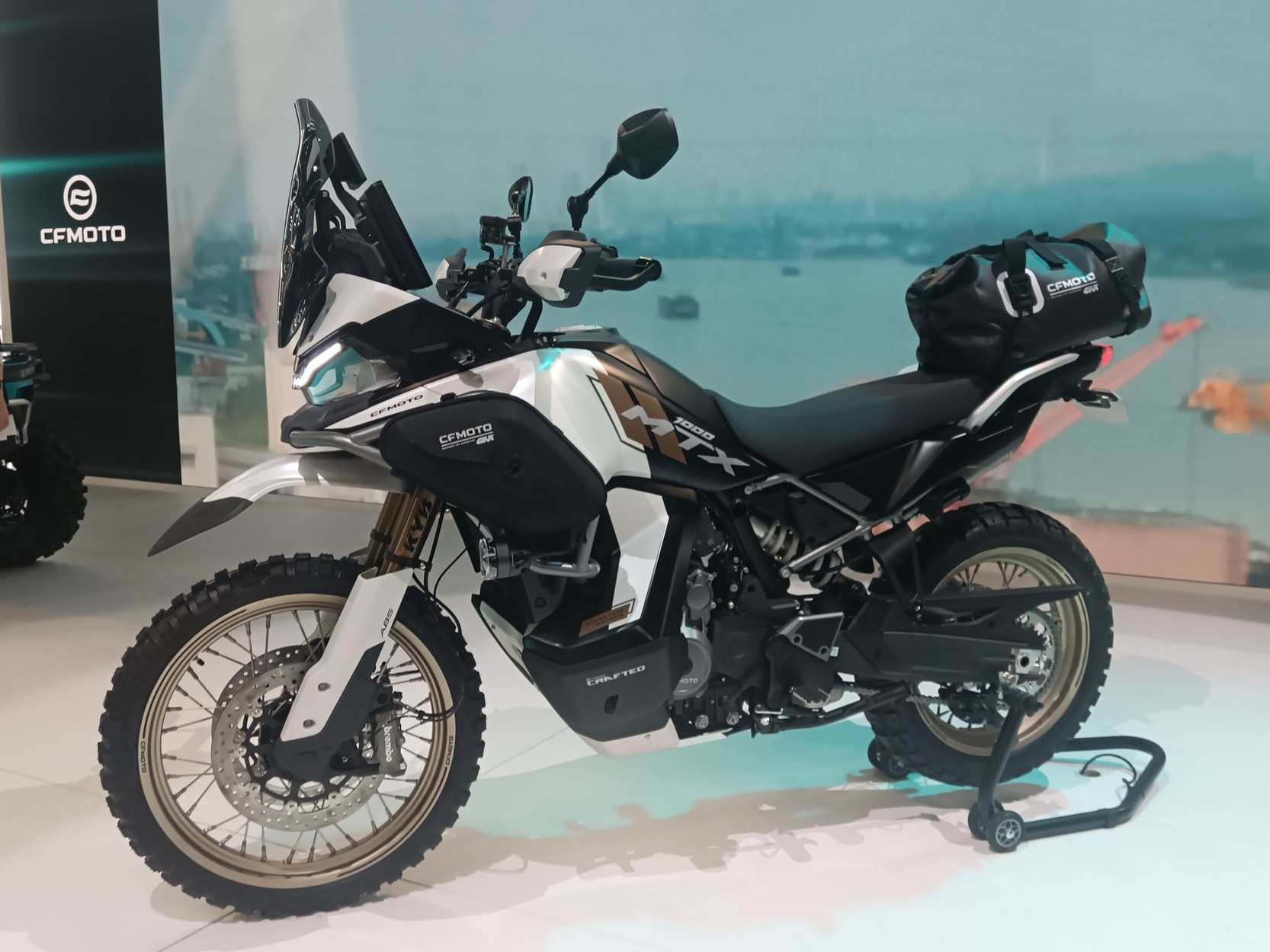
CFMOTO 1000 MT-X Crafted

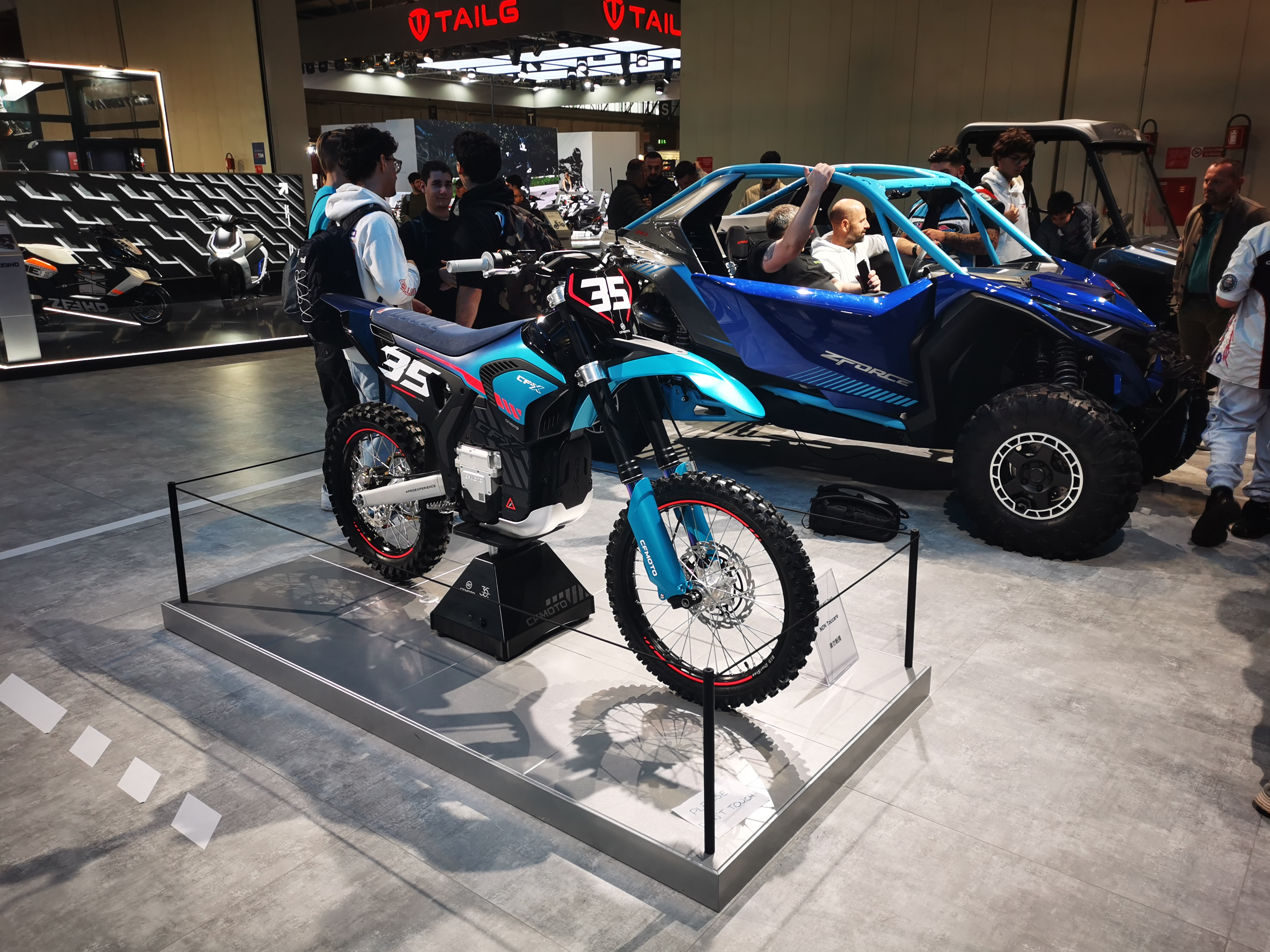
CFMOTO CF X35

The nature of a number of CFMOTO vehicles lends them to competing in off-road events.

=== Rally Raid ===
CFMOTO entered the World Rally-Raid Championship for the first time with a factory effort for 2024. In the W2RC 2024 season, Antanas Kanopkinas won the 3rd place with 62 points in the Quad category.

Year	Event	Class	Model	Rider	Position	Stage Wins
2024	(Saudi Arabia) Dakar Rally	Quad	CForce 1000	(Lithuania) Antanas Kanopkinas	5th	0
2024	(Portugal) BP Ultimate Rally-Raid	Quad	CForce 1000	(Lithuania) Antanas Kanopkinas	2nd	0
2024	(Portugal) BP Ultimate Rally-Raid	Quad	CForce 1000	(France) Gaetan Martinez	3rd	0
2024	(Morocco) Rallye du Maroc	Quad	CForce 1000	(Lithuania) Antanas Kanopkinas	1st	4
2025	(United Arab Emirates) Abu Dhabi Desert Challenge	Quad	CForce 1000	(Lithuania) Antanas Kanopkinas	1st	2
2025	(United Arab Emirates) Abu Dhabi Desert Challenge	Quad	CForce 1000	(France) Gaetan Martinez	2nd	1
2025	South Africa Safari Rally	Quad	CForce 1000	(Lithuania) Antanas Kanopkinas	2nd	2
2025	South Africa Safari Rally	Quad	CForce 1000	(France) Gaetan Martinez	1st	4
2025	(Portugal) BP Ultimate Rally-Raid	Quad	CForce 1000	(Lithuania) Antanas Kanopkinas	2nd	3
2025	(Portugal) BP Ultimate Rally-Raid	Quad	CForce 1000	(France) Gaetan Martinez	1st	3

== Models ==
=== Motorcycles ===
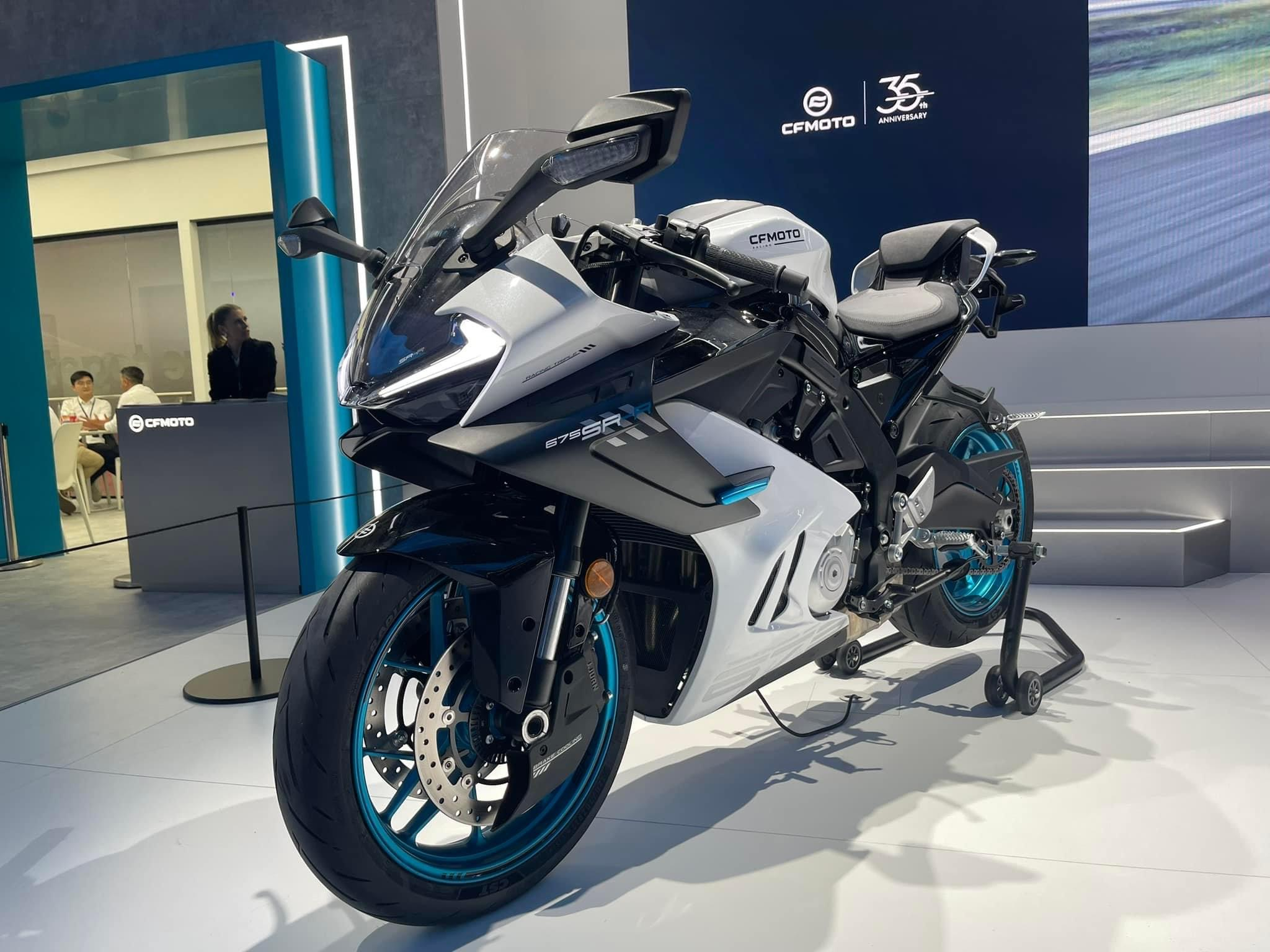
CFMOTO 675 SR-R

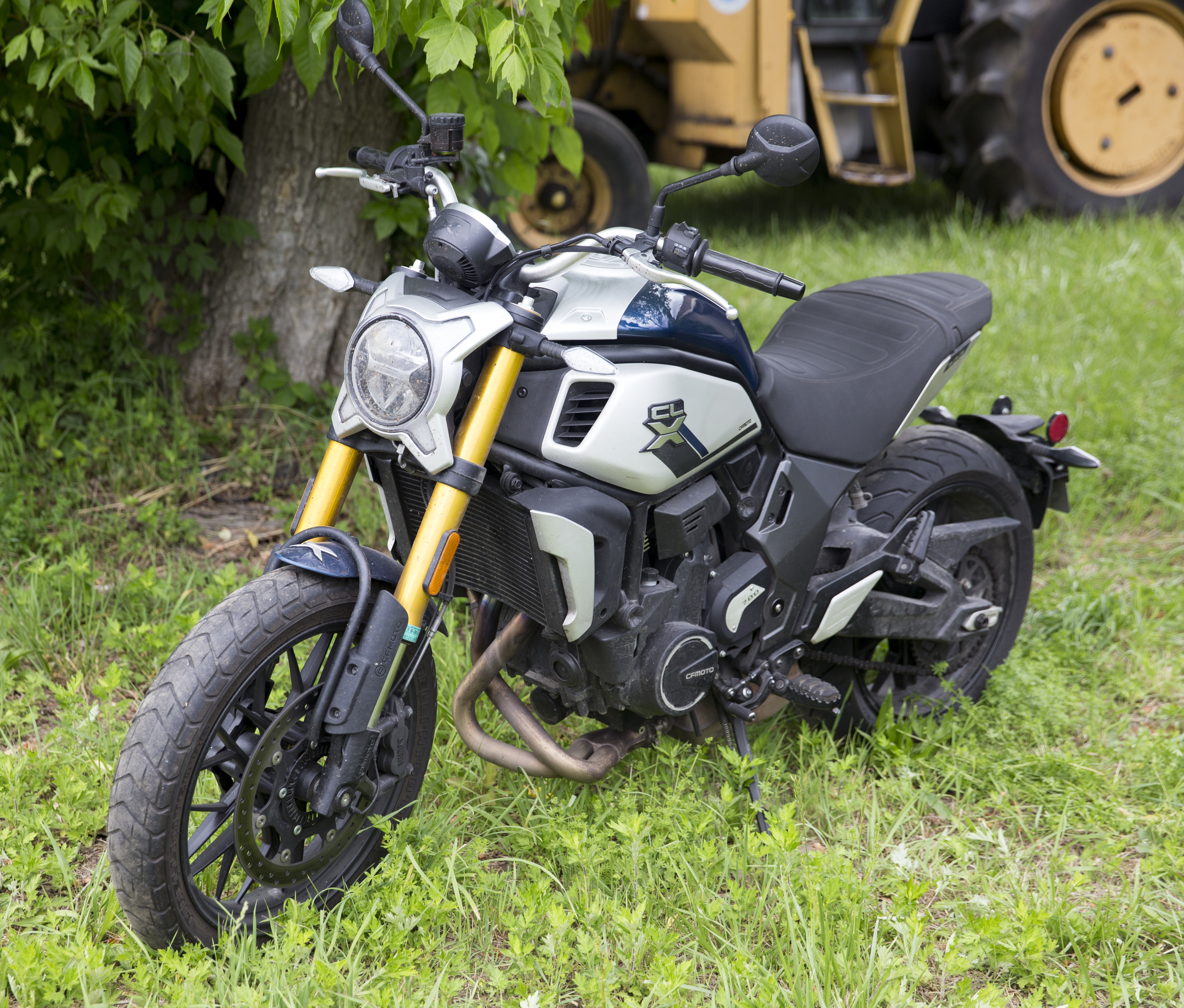
CFMOTO 700 CL-X

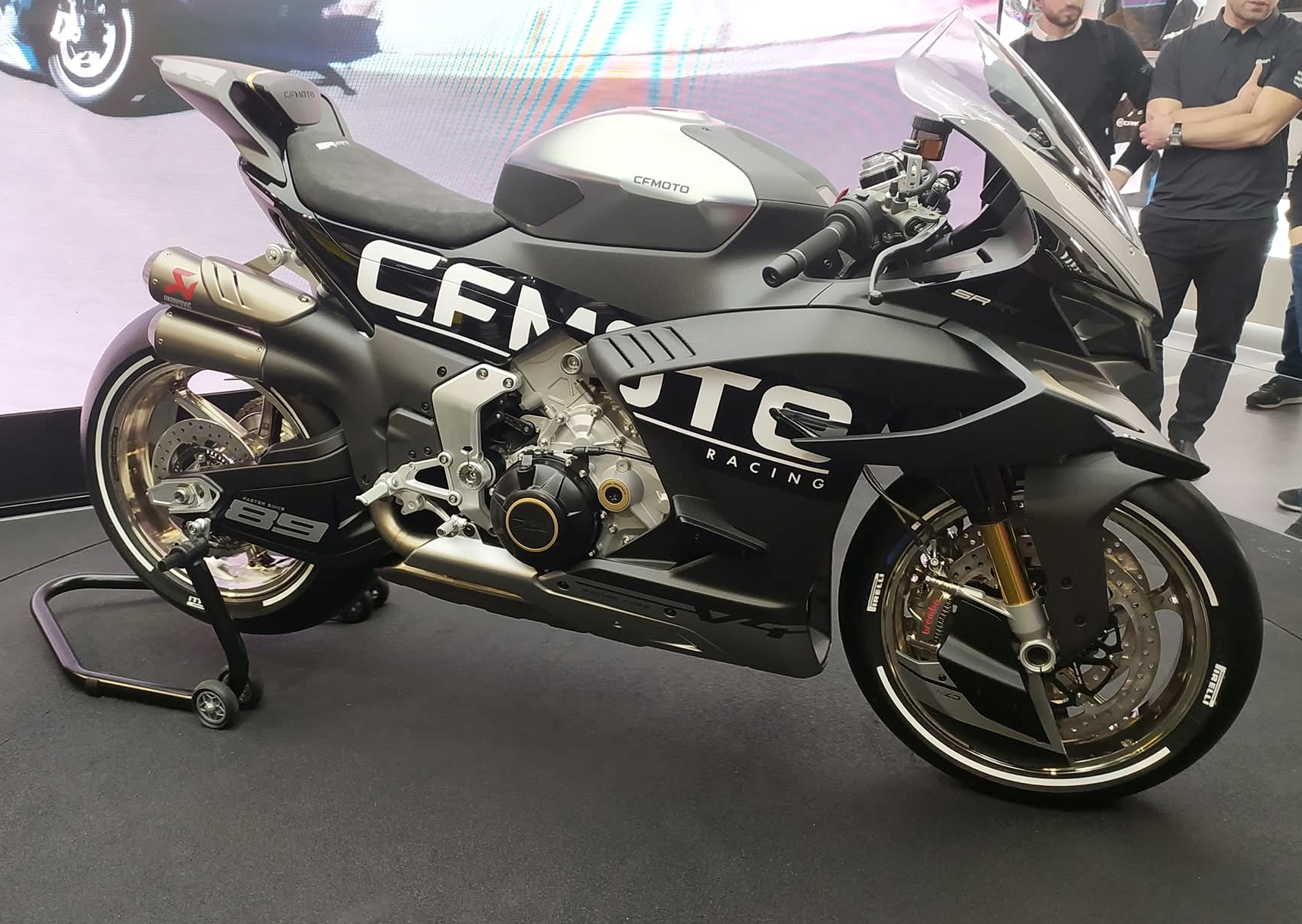
CFMOTO V4 SR-RR Prototype

==== Standard/Naked ====
- 125 NK
- 250 NK
- 300 NK
- 450 NK
- 650 NK
- 675 NK
- 800 NK

==== Sport ====
- 250 SR
- 250 SR (YENİ)
- 300 SR
- 450 SR
- 500 SR
- 500 SR Voom
- 450 SR-S
- 750 SR-S
- 675 SR-R
- V4 SR-RR

==== Cruiser ====
- 450 CL-C
- 300 CL-X
- 700 CL-X

==== Dual-Sport ====
- 450 MT
- 550 MT
- 650 MT
- 700 MT
- 800 MT
- 800 MT-ES
- 800 MT-X
- 1000 MT-X
- CFLite 250 Dual

==== Touring ====
- 1250 TR-G
- 650 GT

==== Minibike ====
- XO Papio Racer
- XO Papio Trail

==== Quads/ATV ====
- CFORCE 110
- CFORCE EV110
- CFORCE 450
- CFORCE 520
- CFORCE 625
- CFORCE 850
- CFORCE 1000

==== UTV ====
- UFORCE 600
- UFORCE 1000
- UFORCE 1000 XL

==== SSV ====
- ZFORCE 800
- ZFORCE 950
- ZFORCE 1000

==== E-bikes ====
Those are classified as electric bicycles in China, despite a lack of bicycle foot pedals.

- ZEEHO
- ZEEHO City
