= CFMoto 650 =

CFMOTO 650
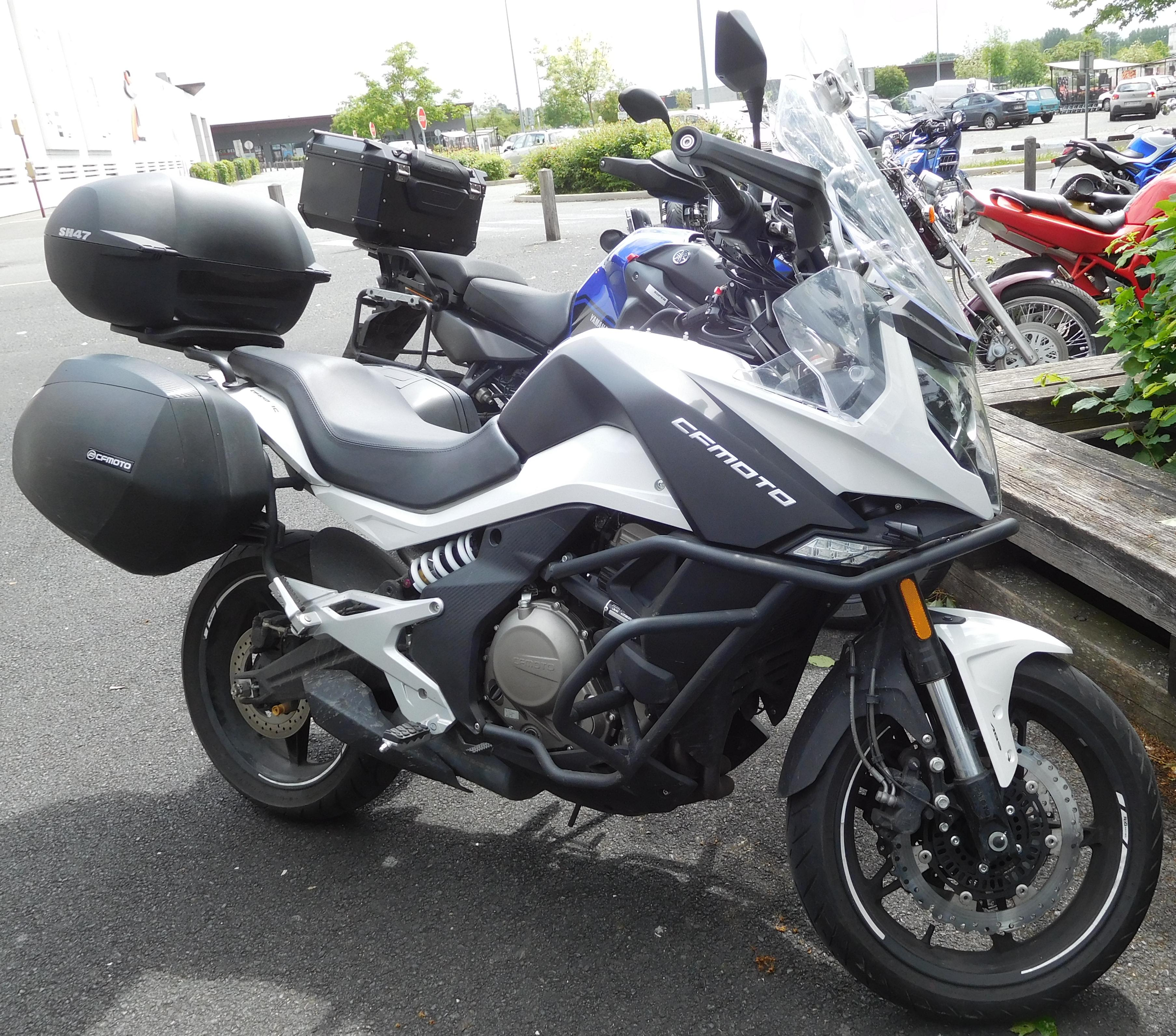
- CFMOTO 650MT
- Manufacturer: CFMOTO
- Production: 2012–2025
- Engine: 649 cc (39.6 cu in) four-stroke, liquid-cooled, DOHC, parallel twin 180°
- Bore / stroke: 83 mm × 60 mm (3.3 in × 2.4 in)
- Power: 51 kW (68 hp; 69 PS) @ 8,500 rpm
- Torque: 62 N⋅m (46 lbf⋅ft) @ 7,000 rpm

The CFMOTO 650 is a line of motorcycles produced by CFMOTO. The range consists of the 650GT, 650MT and 650NK.

== History ==
The first of the CFMOTO 650 motorcycles is the 650NK, which was released in 2012. Five years later, two new models were released in 2017, the 650GT and 650MT.

== Police use ==
The CFMOTO CF650-2 is a police version of the 650TR-G. It is the first high-horsepower motorcycle designed and produced in China. Its in-line twin-cylinder eight-valve engine has a volume of 650 Cubic centimeters, with a net weight of 458 pounds (208 kilograms), it only takes 11 seconds for a motorcycle to accelerate from a standstill to a speed of 200 kilometers per hour. With an adjustable windshield, it can reduce wind resistance when driving at high speed, thereby saving fuel consumption.

The CF650-2 was highly recommended by the Police Equipment Procurement Center of the Ministry of Public Security, and was listed as a designated vehicle, and was adopted by many People's Police traffic units. On 13 January 2014, two 2014 versions of the CF650-2 were tested by the traffic departments of the Hong Kong Police Force for a period of 7 weeks to assess the suitability of introducing them to Hong Kong.

In 2021, The Consul General of the People's Republic of China on March 9 turned over 43 units of CF650 motorcycles to Task Force Davao of the Philippine National Police strengthen the city's security unit.
