= 2024 Qatar motorcycle Grand Prix =

Motorcycle races in Lusail

2024 Qatar Grand Prix
Race details
- Race 1 of 20 races in the 2024 Grand Prix motorcycle racing season
- Date: 10 March 2024
- Official name: Qatar Airways Grand Prix of Qatar
- Location: Lusail International Circuit; Lusail, Qatar
- Course: Permanent racing facility; 5.380 km (3.343 mi)

MotoGP
Pole position
Rider	(Spain) Jorge Martín	Ducati
Time	1:50.789	
Fastest lap
Rider	(Spain) Pedro Acosta	KTM
Time	1:52.657 on lap 2	
Podium
First	(Italy) Francesco Bagnaia	Ducati
Second	(South Africa) Brad Binder	KTM
Third	(Spain) Jorge Martín	Ducati

Moto2
Pole position
Rider	(Spain) Arón Canet	Kalex
Time	1:56.788	
Fastest lap
Rider	(Spain) Arón Canet	Kalex
Time	1:57.661 on lap 3	
Podium
First	(Spain) Alonso López	Boscoscuro
Second	(Belgium) Barry Baltus	Kalex
Third	(Spain) Sergio García	Boscoscuro

Moto3
Pole position
Rider	(Spain) Daniel Holgado	Gas Gas
Time	2:02.276	
Fastest lap
Rider	(Japan) Tatsuki Suzuki	Husqvarna
Time	2:03.135 on lap 3	
Podium
First	(Colombia) David Alonso	CFMoto
Second	(Spain) Daniel Holgado	Gas Gas
Third	(Japan) Taiyo Furusato	Honda

The 2024 Qatar motorcycle Grand Prix (officially known as the Qatar Airways Grand Prix of Qatar) was the first round of the 2024 Grand Prix motorcycle racing season. It was held at the Lusail International Circuit in Lusail on 10 March 2024.

== New Practice Format ==
Dorna Sports officially announced changes to the format of the MotoGP racing week in 2024, specifically the format of the Moto3 and Moto2 class training sessions. They announced this through the official championship website. Just like the MotoGP class, the Moto3 and Moto2 practice sessions on Friday morning are now called 'first free practice sessions' aka FP1, which means that the time recorded in this session does not count to determine which riders qualify for the Qualification 1 (Q1) and Qualification 2 (Q2) sessions. Meanwhile, the Moto3 and Moto2 practice sessions on Friday afternoon are now called 'first practice sessions' aka PR1. The Moto3 and Moto2 practice sessions on Saturday morning are still called 'second practice sessions' aka PR2. The combination of time records in the PR1 and PR2 sessions also determines which riders qualify for Q1 and Q2. The MotoGP class format has not changed. The FP1 session on Friday morning and the FP2 session on Saturday afternoon do not determine which riders qualify for Q1 and Q2, as this will be determined in the PR session on Friday afternoon. The Sprint race will still be held on Saturday afternoon, while the warm-up session (WUP) will be held on Sunday morning. The Moto3, Moto2, and MotoGP Grand Prix races will still be held on Sunday afternoon. Then, the MotoE schedule will be adjusted to the schedule of the other three classes.

== Practice session ==
=== MotoGP ===
==== Combined Free Practice 1-2 ====
Fastest session lap

Pos.	No.	Biker	Constructor	Team	Free practice times	
Pos.	No.	Biker	Constructor	Team	P1	P2
1	89	(Spain) Jorge Martín	Ducati	Prima Pramac Racing	**1:52.624**	2:09.495
2	41	(Spain) Aleix Espargaró	Aprilia	Aprilia Racing	1:52.671	2:09.777
3	31	(Spain) Pedro Acosta	KTM	Red Bull GASGAS Tech3	1:52.695	2:06.938
4	93	(Spain) Marc Márquez	Ducati	Gresini Racing MotoGP	1:52.801	**2:06.544**
5	33	(South Africa) Brad Binder	KTM	Red Bull KTM Factory Racing	1:52.889	2:07.345
6	5	(France) Johann Zarco	Honda	CASTROL Honda LCR	1:52.927	2:08.321
7	23	(Italy) Enea Bastianini	Ducati	Ducati Lenovo Team	1:52.950	2:07.436
8	49	(Italy) Fabio Di Giannantonio	Ducati	Pertamina Enduro VR46 MotoGP Team	1:52.987	2:07.997
9	43	(Australia) Jack Miller	KTM	Red Bull KTM Factory Racing	1:53.031	2:07.263
10	1	(Italy) Francesco Bagnaia	Ducati	Ducati Lenovo Team	1:53.221	2:08.494
11	73	(Spain) Álex Márquez	Ducati	Gresini Racing MotoGP	1:53.250	2:08.103
12	88	(Portugal) Miguel Oliveira	Aprilia	Trackhouse Racing	1:53.338	2:09.813
13	12	(Spain) Maverick Viñales	Aprilia	Aprilia Racing	1:53.351	2:08.839
14	25	(Spain) Raúl Fernández	Aprilia	Trackhouse Racing	1:53.380	2:07.384
15	42	(Spain) Álex Rins	Yamaha	Monster Energy Yamaha MotoGP	1:53.407	2:10.535
16	36	(Spain) Joan Mir	Honda	Repsol Honda Team	1:53.435	2:08.327
17	10	(Italy) Luca Marini	Honda	Repsol Honda Team	1:53.608	2:09.184
18	72	(Italy) Marco Bezzecchi	Ducati	Pertamina Enduro VR46 MotoGP Team	1:53.626	2:08.648
19	20	(France) Fabio Quartararo	Yamaha	Monster Energy Yamaha MotoGP	1:53.837	2:08.702
20	37	(Spain) Augusto Fernández	KTM	Red Bull GASGAS Tech3	1:53.847	2:06.834
21	30	(Japan) Takaaki Nakagami	Honda	IDEMITSU Honda LCR	1:53.863	2:10.350
22	21	(Italy) Franco Morbidelli	Ducati	Prima Pramac Racing	1:54.749	2:09.399
OFFICIAL MOTOGP COMBINED PRACTICE TIMES REPORT

==== Practice ====
The top ten riders (written in bold) qualified for Q2.

Pos.	No.	Biker	Constructor	Team	
Pos.	No.	Biker	Constructor	Team	Time results
1	73	**(Spain) Álex Márquez**	**Ducati**	**Gresini Racing MotoGP**	**1:51.108**
2	89	**(Spain) Jorge Martín**	**Ducati**	**Prima Pramac Racing**	1:51.118
3	49	**(Italy) Fabio Di Giannantonio**	**Ducati**	**Pertamina Enduro VR46 MotoGP Team**	1:51.217
4	1	**(Italy) Francesco Bagnaia**	**Ducati**	**Ducati Lenovo Team**	1:51.238
5	12	**(Spain) Maverick Viñales**	**Aprilia**	**Aprilia Racing**	1:51.356
6	31	**(Spain) Pedro Acosta**	**KTM**	**Red Bull GASGAS Tech3**	1:51.372
7	41	**(Spain) Aleix Espargaró**	**Aprilia**	**Aprilia Racing**	1:51.425
8	23	**(Italy) Enea Bastianini**	**Ducati**	**Ducati Lenovo Team**	1:51.454
9	93	**(Spain) Marc Márquez**	**Ducati**	**Gresini Racing MotoGP**	1:51.469
10	33	**(South Africa) Brad Binder**	**KTM**	**Red Bull KTM Factory Racing**	1:51.487
11	25	(Spain) Raúl Fernández	Aprilia	Trackhouse Racing	1:51.519
12	88	(Portugal) Miguel Oliveira	Aprilia	Trackhouse Racing	1:51.578
13	72	(Italy) Marco Bezzecchi	Ducati	Pertamina Enduro VR46 MotoGP Team	1:51.931
14	20	(France) Fabio Quartararo	Yamaha	Monster Energy Yamaha MotoGP	1:52.088
15	43	(Australia) Jack Miller	KTM	Red Bull KTM Factory Racing	1:52.216
16	5	(France) Johann Zarco	Honda	CASTROL Honda LCR	1:52.313
17	36	(Spain) Joan Mir	Honda	Repsol Honda Team	1:52.321
18	37	(Spain) Augusto Fernández	KTM	Red Bull GASGAS Tech3	1:52.547
19	42	(Spain) Álex Rins	Yamaha	Monster Energy Yamaha MotoGP	1:52.924
20	30	(Japan) Takaaki Nakagami	Honda	IDEMITSU Honda LCR	1:52.935
21	21	(Italy) Franco Morbidelli	Ducati	Prima Pramac Racing	1:53.423
22	10	(Italy) Luca Marini	Honda	Repsol Honda Team	1:53.536
OFFICIAL MOTOGP PRACTICE TIMES REPORT

=== Moto2 ===
==== Free practice ====
Pos.	No.	Biker	Team	Constructor	
Pos.	No.	Biker	Team	Constructor	Time results
1	54	(Spain) Fermin Aldeguer	Sync SpeedUp	Boscoscuro	**1:58.373**
2	84	(Netherlands) Zonta van den Goorbergh	RW-Idrofoglia Racing GP	Kalex	1:58.407
3	13	(Italy) Celestino Vietti	Red Bull KTM Ajo	Kalex	1:58.663
4	96	(United Kingdom) Jake Dixon	CFMOTO Aspar Team	Kalex	1:58.666
5	18	(Spain) Manuel González	QJMOTOR Gresini Moto2	Kalex	1:58.676
6	75	(Spain) Albert Arenas	QJMOTOR Gresini Moto2	Kalex	1:58.676
7	52	(Spain) Jeremy Alcoba	Yamaha VR46 Master Camp Team	Kalex	1:58.690
8	64	(Netherlands) Bo Bendsneyder	Pertamina Mandalika GAS UP Team	Kalex	1:58.702
9	35	(Thailand) Somkiat Chantra	IDEMITSU Honda Team Asia	Kalex	1:58.732
10	79	(Japan) Ai Ogura	MT Helmets - MSI	Boscoscuro	1:58.915
11	3	(Spain) Sergio García	MT Helmets - MSI	Boscoscuro	1:58.942
12	14	(Italy) Tony Arbolino	Elf Marc VDS Racing Team	Kalex	1:58.950
13	28	(Spain) Izan Guevara	CFMOTO Aspar Team	Kalex	1:59.052
14	44	(Spain) Arón Canet	Fantic Racing	Kalex	1:59.079
15	12	(Czech Republic) Filip Salač	Elf Marc VDS Racing Team	Kalex	1:59.105
16	53	(Turkey) Deniz Öncü	Red Bull KTM Ajo	Kalex	1:59.198
17	21	(Spain) Alonso López	Sync SpeedUp	Boscoscuro	1:59.202
18	71	(Italy) Dennis Foggia	Italtrans Racing Team	Kalex	1:59.333
19	10	(Brazil) Diogo Moreira	Italtrans Racing Team	Kalex	1:59.397
20	7	(Belgium) Barry Baltus	RW-Idrofoglia Racing GP	Kalex	1:59.397
21	5	(Spain) Jaume Masià	Pertamina Mandalika GAS UP Team	Kalex	1:59.436
22	24	(Spain) Marcos Ramírez	OnlyFans American Racing Team	Kalex	1:59.560
23	15	(South Africa) Darryn Binder	Liqui Moly Husqvarna Intact GP	Kalex	1:59.568
24	71	(Japan) Ayumu Sasaki	Yamaha VR46 Master Camp Team	Kalex	1:59.627
25	20	(Andorra) Xavi Cardelús	Fantic Racing	Kalex	1:59.958
26	16	(United States) Joe Roberts	OnlyFans American Racing Team	Kalex	2:00.068
27	81	(Australia) Senna Agius	Liqui Moly Husqvarna Intact GP	Kalex	2:00.501
28	11	(Spain) Álex Escrig	KLINT Forward Factory Team	Forward Racing	2:01.152
29	34	(Indonesia) Mario Aji	IDEMITSU Honda Team Asia	Kalex	2:01.214
30	43	(Spain) Xavier Artigas	KLINT Forward Factory Team	Forward Racing	2:02.256
OFFICIAL MOTO2 FREE PRACTICE TIMES REPORT

==== Combined Practice 1-2 ====
The top fourteen riders (written in bold) qualified for Q2.

Fastest session lap

Pos.	No.	Biker	Team	Constructor	Free practice times	
Pos.	No.	Biker	Team	Constructor	P1	P2
1	44	(Spain) **Arón Canet**	**Fantic Racing**	**Kalex**	No time	1:57.176
2	35	(Thailand) **Somkiat Chantra**	**IDEMITSU Honda Team Asia**	**Kalex**	No time	1:57.425
3	14	(Italy) **Tony Arbolino**	**Elf Marc VDS Racing Team**	**Kalex**	No time	1:57.521
4	54	(Spain) **Fermin Aldeguer**	**Sync SpeedUp**	**Boscoscuro**	No time	1:57.557
5	79	(Japan) **Ai Ogura**	**MT Helmets - MSI**	**Boscoscuro**	No time	1:57.596
6	84	(Netherlands) **Zonta van den Goorbergh**	**RW-Idrofoglia Racing GP**	**Kalex**	No time	1:57.625
7	18	(Spain) **Manuel González**	**QJMOTOR Gresini Moto2**	**Kalex**	No time	1:57.709
8	3	(Spain) **Sergio García**	**MT Helmets - MSI**	**Boscoscuro**	No time	1:57.779
9	15	(South Africa) **Darryn Binder**	**Liqui Moly Husqvarna Intact GP**	**Kalex**	No time	1:57.821
10	13	(Italy) **Celestino Vietti**	**Red Bull KTM Ajo**	**Kalex**	No time	1:57.863
11	24	(Spain) **Marcos Ramírez**	**OnlyFans American Racing Team**	**Kalex**	No time	1:57.868
12	64	(Netherlands) **Bo Bendsneyder**	**Pertamina Mandalika GAS UP Team**	**Kalex**	2:15.898	1:57.878
13	21	(Spain) **Alonso López**	**Sync SpeedUp**	**Boscoscuro**	No time	1:57.908
14	28	(Spain) **Izan Guevara**	**CFMOTO Aspar Team**	**Kalex**	No time	1:57.962
15	7	(Belgium) Barry Baltus	RW-Idrofoglia Racing GP	Kalex	No time	1:58.051
16	75	(Spain) Albert Arenas	QJMOTOR Gresini Moto2	Kalex	No time	1:58.208
17	16	(United States) Joe Roberts	OnlyFans American Racing Team	Kalex	No time	1:58.220
18	12	(Czech Republic) Filip Salač	Elf Marc VDS Racing Team	Kalex	No time	1:58.251
19	71	(Italy) Dennis Foggia	Italtrans Racing Team	Kalex	No time	1:58.264
20	52	(Spain) Jeremy Alcoba	Yamaha VR46 Master Camp Team	Kalex	No time	1:58.441
21	81	(Australia) Senna Agius	Liqui Moly Husqvarna Intact GP	Kalex	No time	1:58.482
22	53	(Turkey) Deniz Öncü	Red Bull KTM Ajo	Kalex	No time	1:58.683
23	71	(Japan) Ayumu Sasaki	Yamaha VR46 Master Camp Team	Kalex	No time	1:58.775
24	96	(United Kingdom) Jake Dixon	CFMOTO Aspar Team	Kalex	No time	1:58.922
25	10	(Brazil) Diogo Moreira	Italtrans Racing Team	Kalex	No time	1:59.030
26	11	(Spain) Álex Escrig	KLINT Forward Factory Team	Forward Racing	2:19.104	1:59.377
27	34	(Indonesia) Mario Aji	IDEMITSU Honda Team Asia	Kalex	No time	1:59.384
28	5	(Spain) Jaume Masià	Pertamina Mandalika GAS UP Team	Kalex	2:14.891	1:59.418
29	20	(Andorra) Xavi Cardelús	Fantic Racing	Kalex	No time	1:59.464
30	43	(Spain) Xavier Artigas	KLINT Forward Factory Team	Forward Racing	2:16.882	2:01.527
OFFICIAL MOTO2 PRACTICE TIMES REPORT

=== Moto3 ===
==== Free practice ====
Pos.	No.	Biker	Team	Constructor	
Pos.	No.	Biker	Team	Constructor	Time results
1	48	(Spain) Iván Ortolá	MT Helmets - MSI	KTM	**2:04.205**
2	99	(Spain) José Antonio Rueda	Red Bull KTM Ajo	KTM	2:04.373
3	64	(Spain) David Muñoz	BOE Motorsports	KTM	2:04.445
4	80	(Colombia) David Alonso	CFMOTO Aspar Team	CFMoto	2:04.605
5	24	(Japan) Tatsuki Suzuki	Liqui Moly Husqvarna Intact GP	Husqvarna	2:04.792
6	96	(Spain) Daniel Holgado	Red Bull GASGAS Tech3	Gas Gas	2:04.954
7	95	(Netherlands) Collin Veijer	Liqui Moly Husqvarna Intact GP	Husqvarna	2:04.969
8	31	(Spain) Adrián Fernández	Leopard Racing	Honda	2:05.049
9	78	(Spain) Joel Esteban	CFMOTO Aspar Team	CFMoto	2:05.132
10	58	(Italy) Luca Lunetta	SIC58 Squadra Corse	Honda	2:05.146
11	82	(Italy) Stefano Nepa	LEVELUP - MTA	KTM	2:05.156
12	21	(Spain) Vicente Pérez	Red Bull KTM Ajo	KTM	2:05.341
13	18	(Italy) Matteo Bertelle	Rivacold Snipers Team	Honda	2:05.361
14	54	(Italy) Riccardo Rossi	CIP Green Power	KTM	2:05.447
15	7	(Italy) Filippo Farioli	SIC58 Squadra Corse	Honda	2:05.541
16	22	(Spain) David Almansa	Rivacold Snipers Team	Honda	2:05.591
17	19	(United Kingdom) Scott Ogden	MLav Racing	Honda	2:05.608
18	72	(Japan) Taiyo Furusato	Honda Team Asia	Honda	2:05.613
19	6	(Japan) Ryusei Yamanaka	MT Helmets - MSI	KTM	2:05.634
20	12	(Australia) Jacob Roulstone	Red Bull GASGAS Tech3	Gas Gas	2:06.283
21	70	(United Kingdom) Joshua Whatley	MLav Racing	Honda	2:06.380
22	55	(Switzerland) Noah Dettwiler	CIP Green Power	KTM	2:06.436
23	36	(Spain) Ángel Piqueras	Leopard Racing	Honda	2:06.542
24	66	(Australia) Joel Kelso	BOE Motorsports	KTM	2:06.882
25	5	(Thailand) Tatchakorn Buasri	Honda Team Asia	Honda	2:07.343
26	10	(Italy) Nicola Carraro	LEVELUP - MTA	KTM	2:07.568
OFFICIAL MOTO3 FREE PRACTICE TIMES REPORT

==== Practice ====
The top fourteen riders (written in bold) qualified for Q2.

Fastest session lap

Pos.	No.	Biker	Team	Constructor	Free practice times	
Pos.	No.	Biker	Team	Constructor	P1	P2
1	31	(Spain) **José Antonio Rueda**	**Red Bull KTM Ajo**	**KTM**	2:03.778	2:03.465
2	80	(Colombia) **David Alonso**	**CFMOTO Aspar Team**	**CFMoto**	2:03.990	2:03.521
3	48	(Spain) **Iván Ortolá**	**MT Helmets - MSI**	**KTM**	2:03.835	2:03.524
4	96	(Spain) **Daniel Holgado**	**Red Bull GASGAS Tech3**	**Gas Gas**	2:03.606	2:03.840
5	31	(Spain) **Adrián Fernández**	**Leopard Racing**	**Honda**	2:03.669	2:04.168
6	18	(Italy) **Matteo Bertelle**	**Rivacold Snipers Team**	**Honda**	2:03.775	2:04.934
7	64	(Spain) **David Muñoz**	**BOE Motorsports**	**KTM**	2:04.135	2:03.795
8	54	(Italy) **Riccardo Rossi**	**CIP Green Power**	**KTM**	2:03.862	2:04.081
9	82	(Italy) **Stefano Nepa**	**LEVELUP - MTA**	**KTM**	2:04.019	2:04.120
10	95	(Netherlands) **Collin Veijer**	**Liqui Moly Husqvarna Intact GP**	**Husqvarna**	2:05.162	2:04.150
11	21	(Spain) **Vicente Pérez**	**Red Bull KTM Ajo**	**KTM**	2:05.788	2:04.279
12	66	(Australia) **Joel Kelso**	**BOE Motorsports**	**KTM**	2:04.282	2:04.791
13	12	(Australia) **Jacob Roulstone**	**Red Bull GASGAS Tech3**	**Gas Gas**	2:04.399	2:04.749
14	6	(Japan) **Ryusei Yamanaka**	**MT Helmets - MSI**	**KTM**	2:04.417	2:04.981
15	58	(Italy) Luca Lunetta	SIC58 Squadra Corse	Honda	2:05.255	2:04.478
16	7	(Italy) Filippo Farioli	SIC58 Squadra Corse	Honda	2:04.539	2:04.763
17	36	(Spain) Ángel Piqueras	Leopard Racing	Honda	2:06.379	2:04.604
18	78	(Spain) Joel Esteban	CFMOTO Aspar Team	CFMoto	2:06.254	2:04.669
19	10	(Italy) Nicola Carraro	LEVELUP - MTA	KTM	2:05.810	2:04.806
20	22	(Spain) David Almansa	Rivacold Snipers Team	Honda	2:04.848	No time
21	72	(Japan) Taiyo Furusato	Honda Team Asia	Honda	2:05.649	2:04.868
22	19	(United Kingdom) Scott Ogden	MLav Racing	Honda	2:05.162	2:05.343
23	24	(Japan) Tatsuki Suzuki	Liqui Moly Husqvarna Intact GP	Husqvarna	2:05.215	2:05.212
24	70	(United Kingdom) Joshua Whatley	MLav Racing	Honda	2:07.220	2:05.385
25	5	(Thailand) Tatchakorn Buasri	Honda Team Asia	Honda	2:06.720	2:05.767
26	55	(Switzerland) Noah Dettwiler	CIP Green Power	KTM	2:06.990	2:06.458
OFFICIAL MOTO3 COMBINED PRACTICE TIMES REPORT

== Qualifying ==
=== MotoGP ===
Fastest session lap

Pos.	No.	Biker	Constructor	Team	Qualifying times		Final grid	Row
Pos.	No.	Biker	Constructor	Team	Q1	Q2	Final grid	Row
1	89	(Spain) Jorge Martín	Ducati	Prima Pramac Racing	Qualified in Q2	1:50.789	1	1
2	41	(Spain) Aleix Espargaró	Aprilia	Aprilia Racing	Qualified in Q2	1:50.872	2	1
3	23	(Italy) Enea Bastianini	Ducati	Ducati Lenovo Team	Qualified in Q2	1:50.875	3	1
4	33	(South Africa) Brad Binder	KTM	Red Bull KTM Factory Racing	Qualified in Q2	1:50.913	4	2
5	63	(Italy) Francesco Bagnaia	Ducati	Ducati Lenovo Team	Qualified in Q2	1:50.928	5	2
6	93	(Spain) Marc Márquez	Ducati	Gresini Racing MotoGP	Qualified in Q2	1:50.961	6	2
7	49	(Italy) Fabio Di Giannantonio	Ducati	Pertamina Enduro VR46 MotoGP Team	Qualified in Q2	1:51.019	7	3
8	31	(Spain) Pedro Acosta	KTM	Red Bull GASGAS Tech3	Qualified in Q2	1:51.130	8	3
9	73	(Spain) Álex Márquez	Ducati	Gresini Racing MotoGP	Qualified in Q2	1:51.266	9	3
10	12	(Spain) Maverick Viñales	Aprilia	Aprilia Racing	Qualified in Q2	1:51.306	10	4
11	43	(Australia) Jack Miller	KTM	Red Bull KTM Factory Racing	1:51.526	1:51.340	11	4
12	25	(Spain) Raúl Fernández	Aprilia	Trackhouse Racing	1:51.436	1:51.521	12	4
13	5	(France) Johann Zarco	Honda	CASTROL Honda LCR	1:51.537	N/A	13	5
14	88	(Portugal) Miguel Oliveira	Aprilia	Trackhouse Racing	1:51.565	N/A	14	5
15	72	(Italy) Marco Bezzecchi	Ducati	Pertamina Enduro VR46 MotoGP Team	1:51.864	N/A	15	5
16	20	(France) Fabio Quartararo	Yamaha	Monster Energy Yamaha MotoGP	1:51.918	N/A	16	6
17	36	(Spain) Joan Mir	Honda	Repsol Honda Team	1:52.026	N/A	17	6
18	37	(Spain) Augusto Fernández	KTM	Red Bull GASGAS Tech3	1:52.204	N/A	18	6
19	30	(Japan) Takaaki Nakagami	Honda	IDEMITSU Honda LCR	1:52.228	N/A	19	7
20	42	(Spain) Álex Rins	Yamaha	Monster Energy Yamaha MotoGP	1:52.327	N/A	20	7
21	10	(Italy) Luca Marini	Honda	Repsol Honda Team	1:52.952	N/A	21	7
22	21	(Italy) Franco Morbidelli	Ducati	Prima Pramac Racing	1:52.980	N/A	22	8
OFFICIAL MOTOGP QUALIFYING TIMES REPORT

=== Moto2 ===
Fastest session lap

Pos.	No.	Biker	Team	Constructor	Qualifying times		Final grid	Row
Pos.	No.	Biker	Team	Constructor	P1	P2	Final grid	Row
1	44	(Spain) Arón Canet	Fantic Racing	Kalex	Qualified in Q2	1:56.788	1	1
2	21	(Spain) Alonso López	Sync SpeedUp	Boscoscuro	Qualified in Q2	1:56.890	2	1
3	75	(Spain) Albert Arenas	QJMOTOR Gresini Moto2	Kalex	1:57.652	1:57.025	3	1
4	18	(Spain) Manuel González	QJMOTOR Gresini Moto2	Kalex	Qualified in Q2	1:57.027	4	2
5	14	(Italy) Tony Arbolino	Elf Marc VDS Racing Team	Kalex	Qualified in Q2	1:57.214	5	2
6	7	(Belgium) Barry Baltus	RW-Idrofoglia Racing GP	Kalex	1:57.849	1:57.336	6	2
7	54	(Spain) Fermin Aldeguer	Sync SpeedUp	Boscoscuro	Qualified in Q2	1:57.362	10	4
8	24	(Spain) Marcos Ramírez	OnlyFans American Racing Team	Kalex	Qualified in Q2	1:57.396	7	3
9	28	(Spain) Izan Guevara	CFMOTO Aspar Team	Kalex	Qualified in Q2	1:57.463	8	3
10	84	(Netherlands) Zonta van den Goorbergh	RW-Idrofoglia Racing GP	Kalex	Qualified in Q2	1:57.579	9	3
11	15	(South Africa) Darryn Binder	Liqui Moly Husqvarna Intact GP	Kalex	Qualified in Q2	1:57.584	11	4
12	52	(Spain) Jeremy Alcoba	Yamaha VR46 Master Camp Team	Kalex	1:57.869	1:57.610	12	4
13	79	(Japan) Ai Ogura	MT Helmets - MSI	Boscoscuro	Qualified in Q2	1:57.690	13	5
14	16	(United States) Joe Roberts	OnlyFans American Racing Team	Kalex	1:57.651	1:57.720	14	5
15	35	(Thailand) Somkiat Chantra	IDEMITSU Honda Team Asia	Kalex	Qualified in Q2	1:57.762	15	5
16	13	(Italy) Celestino Vietti	Red Bull KTM Ajo	Kalex	Qualified in Q2	1:57.777	16	6
17	64	(Netherlands) Bo Bendsneyder	Pertamina Mandalika GAS UP Team	Kalex	Qualified in Q2	1:57.795	17	6
18	3	(Spain) Sergio García	MT Helmets - MSI	Boscoscuro	Qualified in Q2	1:58.618	18	6
19	12	(Czech Republic) Filip Salač	Elf Marc VDS Racing Team	Kalex	1:57.982	N/A	19	7
20	53	(Turkey) Deniz Öncü	Red Bull KTM Ajo	Kalex	1:58.004	N/A	20	7
21	81	(Australia) Senna Agius	Liqui Moly Husqvarna Intact GP	Kalex	1:58.345	N/A	21	7
22	5	(Spain) Jaume Masià	Pertamina Mandalika GAS UP Team	Kalex	1:58.412	N/A	22	8
23	71	(Italy) Dennis Foggia	Italtrans Racing Team	Kalex	1:58.464	N/A	23	8
24	11	(Spain) Álex Escrig	KLINT Forward Factory Team	Forward Racing	1:58.493	N/A	24	8
25	71	(Japan) Ayumu Sasaki	Yamaha VR46 Master Camp Team	Kalex	1:58.654	N/A	25	9
26	10	(Brazil) Diogo Moreira	Italtrans Racing Team	Kalex	1:58.817	N/A	26	9
27	20	(Andorra) Xavi Cardelús	Fantic Racing	Kalex	1:59.161	N/A	27	9
28	34	(Indonesia) Mario Aji	IDEMITSU Honda Team Asia	Kalex	1:59.388	N/A	28	10
29	43	(Spain) Xavier Artigas	KLINT Forward Factory Team	Forward Racing	2:01.329	N/A	29	10
	96	(United Kingdom) Jake Dixon	CFMOTO Aspar Team	Kalex	N/A	N/A		
OFFICIAL MOTO2 QUALIFYING TIMES REPORT

=== Moto3 ===
Fastest session lap

Pos.	No.	Biker	Team	Constructor	Qualifying times		Final grid	Row
Pos.	No.	Biker	Team	Constructor	P1	P2	Final grid	Row
1	96	(Spain) Daniel Holgado	Red Bull GASGAS Tech3	Gas Gas	Qualified in Q2	2:02.276	1	1
2	48	(Spain) Iván Ortolá	MT Helmets - MSI	KTM	Qualified in Q2	2:02.541	2	1
3	31	(Spain) José Antonio Rueda	Red Bull KTM Ajo	KTM	Qualified in Q2	2:02.596	3	1
4	31	(Spain) Adrián Fernández	Leopard Racing	Honda	Qualified in Q2	2:02.632	4	2
5	18	(Italy) Matteo Bertelle	Rivacold Snipers Team	Honda	Qualified in Q2	2:02.672	5	2
6	66	(Australia) Joel Kelso	BOE Motorsports	KTM	Qualified in Q2	2:02.691	6	2
7	54	(Italy) Riccardo Rossi	CIP Green Power	KTM	Qualified in Q2	2:03.020	7	3
8	80	(Colombia) David Alonso	CFMOTO Aspar Team	CFMoto	Qualified in Q2	2:03.059	8	3
9	21	(Spain) Vicente Pérez	Red Bull KTM Ajo	KTM	Qualified in Q2	2:03.166	9	3
10	95	(Netherlands) Collin Veijer	Liqui Moly Husqvarna Intact GP	Husqvarna	Qualified in Q2	2:03.249	10	4
11	7	(Italy) Filippo Farioli	SIC58 Squadra Corse	Honda	2:03.541	2:03.327	11	4
12	36	(Spain) Ángel Piqueras	Leopard Racing	Honda	2:03.892	2:03.370	12	4
13	64	(Spain) David Muñoz	BOE Motorsports	KTM	Qualified in Q2	2:03.389	13	5
14	58	(Italy) Luca Lunetta	SIC58 Squadra Corse	Honda	2:04.129	2:03.390	14	5
15	6	(Japan) Ryusei Yamanaka	MT Helmets - MSI	KTM	Qualified in Q2	2:03.462	15	5
16	82	(Italy) Stefano Nepa	LEVELUP - MTA	KTM	Qualified in Q2	2:03.551	16	6
17	12	(Australia) Jacob Roulstone	Red Bull GASGAS Tech3	Gas Gas	Qualified in Q2	2:03.760	17	6
18	72	(Japan) Taiyo Furusato	Honda Team Asia	Honda	2:04.355	2:04.071	18	6
19	24	(Japan) Tatsuki Suzuki	Liqui Moly Husqvarna Intact GP	Husqvarna	2:04.468	N/A	19	7
20	19	(United Kingdom) Scott Ogden	MLav Racing	Honda	2:04.716	N/A	20	7
21	70	(United Kingdom) Joshua Whatley	MLav Racing	Honda	2:04.858	N/A	21	7
22	10	(Italy) Nicola Carraro	LEVELUP - MTA	KTM	2:05.163	N/A	22	8
23	78	(Spain) Joel Esteban	CFMOTO Aspar Team	CFMoto	2:05.355	N/A	23	8
24	5	(Thailand) Tatchakorn Buasri	Honda Team Asia	Honda	2:065.634	N/A	24	8
25	55	(Switzerland) Noah Dettwiler	CIP Green Power	KTM	2:05.738	N/A	25	9
	22	(Spain) David Almansa	Rivacold Snipers Team	Honda	N/A	N/A		
OFFICIAL MOTO3 QUALIFYING TIMES REPORT

== MotoGP Sprint ==
The MotoGP Sprint was held on 9 March.

Pos.	No.	Rider	Team	Constructor	Laps	Time/Retired	Grid	Points
1	89	(Spain) Jorge Martín	Prima Pramac Racing	Ducati	11	20:41.287	1	12
2	33	(South Africa) Brad Binder	Red Bull KTM Factory Racing	KTM	11	+0.548	4	9
3	41	(Spain) Aleix Espargaró	Aprilia Racing	Aprilia	11	+0.729	2	7
4	1	(Italy) Francesco Bagnaia	Ducati Lenovo Team	Ducati	11	+1.625	5	6
5	93	(Spain) Marc Márquez	Gresini Racing MotoGP	Ducati	11	+1.872	6	5
6	23	(Italy) Enea Bastianini	Ducati Lenovo Team	Ducati	11	+2.322	3	4
7	73	(Spain) Álex Márquez	Gresini Racing MotoGP	Ducati	11	+3.154	9	3
8	31	(Spain) Pedro Acosta	Red Bull GASGAS Tech3	KTM	11	+4.431	8	2
9	12	(Spain) Maverick Viñales	Aprilia Racing	Aprilia	11	+6.738	10	1
10	43	(Australia) Jack Miller	Red Bull KTM Factory Racing	KTM	11	+12.670	11	
11	72	(Italy) Marco Bezzecchi	Pertamina Enduro VR46 MotoGP Team	Ducati	11	+12.835	15	
12	20	(France) Fabio Quartararo	Monster Energy Yamaha MotoGP	Yamaha	11	+12.863	16	
13	88	(Portugal) Miguel Oliveira	Trackhouse Racing	Aprilia	11	+13.095	14	
14	25	(Spain) Raúl Fernández	Trackhouse Racing	Aprilia	11	+13.795	12	
15	36	(Spain) Joan Mir	Repsol Honda Team	Honda	11	+14.096	17	
16	5	(France) Johann Zarco	CASTROL Honda LCR	Honda	11	+14.840	13	
17	42	(Spain) Álex Rins	Monster Energy Yamaha MotoGP	Yamaha	11	+15.629	20	
18	37	(Spain) Augusto Fernández	Red Bull GASGAS Tech3	KTM	11	+17.711	18	
19	30	(Japan) Takaaki Nakagami	IDEMITSU Honda LCR	Honda	11	+22.733	19	
20	21	(Italy) Franco Morbidelli	Prima Pramac Racing	Ducati	11	+23.267	22	
21	10	(Italy) Luca Marini	Repsol Honda Team	Honda	11	+25.553	21	
Ret	49	(Italy) Fabio Di Giannantonio	Pertamina Enduro VR46 MotoGP Team	Ducati	2	Accident	7	
Fastest sprint lap: (Spain) Marc Márquez (Ducati) – 1:52.040 (lap 3)
OFFICIAL MOTOGP SPRINT REPORT

== Warm Up ==
=== Warm Up MotoGP ===
Pos.	No.	Biker	Constructor	Team	
Pos.	No.	Biker	Constructor	Team	Time results
1	12	(Spain) Maverick Viñales	Aprilia	Aprilia Racing	1:52.660
2	72	(Italy) Marco Bezzecchi	Ducati	Pertamina Enduro VR46 MotoGP Team	1:52.731
3	25	(Spain) Raúl Fernández	Aprilia	Trackhouse Racing	1:52.749
4	73	(Spain) Álex Márquez	Ducati	Gresini Racing MotoGP	1:52.753
5	31	(Spain) Pedro Acosta	KTM	Red Bull GASGAS Tech3	1:52.842
6	49	(Italy) Fabio Di Giannantonio	Ducati	Pertamina Enduro VR46 MotoGP Team	1:52.873
7	93	(Spain) Marc Márquez	Ducati	Gresini Racing MotoGP	1:52.923
8	63	(Italy) Francesco Bagnaia	Ducati	Ducati Lenovo Team	1:53.011
9	23	(Italy) Enea Bastianini	Ducati	Ducati Lenovo Team	1:53.240
10	20	(France) Fabio Quartararo	Yamaha	Monster Energy Yamaha MotoGP	1:53.296
11	33	(South Africa) Brad Binder	KTM	Red Bull KTM Factory Racing	1:53.521
12	42	(Spain) Álex Rins	Yamaha	Monster Energy Yamaha MotoGP	1:53.544
13	21	(Italy) Franco Morbidelli	Ducati	Prima Pramac Racing	1:53.570
14	43	(Australia) Jack Miller	KTM	Red Bull KTM Factory Racing	1:53.572
15	37	(Spain) Augusto Fernández	KTM	Red Bull GASGAS Tech3	1:53.687
16	41	(Spain) Aleix Espargaró	Aprilia	Aprilia Racing	1:53.802
17	89	(Spain) Jorge Martín	Ducati	Prima Pramac Racing	1:53.838
18	36	(Spain) Joan Mir	Honda	Repsol Honda Team	1:53.900
19	5	(France) Johann Zarco	Honda	CASTROL Honda LCR	1:54.002
20	30	(Japan) Takaaki Nakagami	Honda	IDEMITSU Honda LCR	1:54.319
21	10	(Italy) Luca Marini	Honda	Repsol Honda Team	1:54.443
22	88	(Portugal) Miguel Oliveira	Aprilia	Trackhouse Racing	1:54.998
OFFICIAL MOTOGP WARM UP TIMES REPORT

== Race ==
=== MotoGP ===
The race was to be scheduled on 22 laps, but was reduced to 21 laps due to the technical problem on Raúl Fernández's bike after the first warm up lap.

Pos.	No.	Rider	Team	Constructor	Laps	Time/Retired	Grid	Points
1	1	(Italy) Francesco Bagnaia	Ducati Lenovo Team	Ducati	21	39:34.869	5	25
2	33	(South Africa) Brad Binder	Red Bull KTM Factory Racing	KTM	21	+1.329	4	20
3	89	(Spain) Jorge Martín	Prima Pramac Racing	Ducati	21	+1.933	1	16
4	93	(Spain) Marc Márquez	Gresini Racing MotoGP	Ducati	21	+3.429	6	13
5	23	(Italy) Enea Bastianini	Ducati Lenovo Team	Ducati	21	+5.153	3	11
6	73	(Spain) Álex Márquez	Gresini Racing MotoGP	Ducati	21	+6.791	9	10
7	49	(Italy) Fabio Di Giannantonio	Pertamina Enduro VR46 MotoGP Team	Ducati	21	+9.161	7	9
8	41	(Spain) Aleix Espargaró	Aprilia Racing	Aprilia	21	+11.242	2	8
9	31	(Spain) Pedro Acosta	Red Bull GASGAS Tech3	KTM	21	+11.595	8	7
10	12	(Spain) Maverick Viñales	Aprilia Racing	Aprilia	21	+13.197	10	6
11	20	(France) Fabio Quartararo	Monster Energy Yamaha MotoGP	Yamaha	21	+17.701	16	5
12	5	(France) Johann Zarco	CASTROL Honda LCR	Honda	21	+18.075	13	4
13	36	(Spain) Joan Mir	Repsol Honda Team	Honda	21	+18.437	17	3
14	72	(Italy) Marco Bezzecchi	Pertamina Enduro VR46 MotoGP Team	Ducati	21	+19.194	15	2
15	88	(Portugal) Miguel Oliveira	Trackhouse Racing	Aprilia	21	+20.717	14	1
16	42	(Spain) Álex Rins	Monster Energy Yamaha MotoGP	Yamaha	21	+24.093	20	
17	37	(Spain) Augusto Fernández	Red Bull GASGAS Tech3	KTM	21	+24.106	18	
18	21	(Italy) Franco Morbidelli	Prima Pramac Racing	Ducati	21	+24.641	22	
19	30	(Japan) Takaaki Nakagami	IDEMITSU Honda LCR	Honda	21	+25.556	19	
20	10	(Italy) Luca Marini	Repsol Honda Team	Honda	21	+42.422	21	
21	43	(Australia) Jack Miller	Red Bull KTM Factory Racing	KTM	21	+42.761	11	
Ret	25	(Spain) Raúl Fernández	Trackhouse Racing	Aprilia	17	Technical problem	12	
Fastest lap: (Spain) Pedro Acosta (KTM) – 1:52.657 (lap 2)
OFFICIAL MOTOGP RACE REPORT

=== Moto2 ===
Pos.	No.	Rider	Team	Constructor	Laps	Time/Retired	Grid	Points
1	21	(Spain) Alonso López	Sync Speed Up	Boscoscuro	18	35:45.595	2	25
2	7	(Belgium) Barry Baltus	RW-Idrofoglia Racing GP	Kalex	18	+0.055	6	20
3	3	(Spain) Sergio García	MT Helmets – MSi	Boscoscuro	18	+0.742	18	16
4	79	(Japan) Ai Ogura	MT Helmets – MSi	Boscoscuro	18	+1.514	13	13
5	18	(Spain) Manuel González	QJmotor Gresini Moto2	Kalex	18	+5.100	4	11
6	42	(Spain) Marcos Ramírez	OnlyFans American Racing Team	Kalex	18	+5.320	7	10
7	16	(United States) Joe Roberts	OnlyFans American Racing Team	Kalex	18	+9.058	14	9
8	75	(Spain) Albert Arenas	QJmotor Gresini Moto2	Kalex	18	+9.210	3	8
9	13	(Italy) Celestino Vietti	Red Bull KTM Ajo	Kalex	18	+10.710	16	7
10	44	(Spain) Arón Canet	Fantic Racing	Kalex	18	+10.879	1	6
11	35	(Thailand) Somkiat Chantra	Idemitsu Honda Team Asia	Kalex	18	+15.066	15	5
12	52	(Spain) Jeremy Alcoba	Yamaha VR46 Master Camp Team	Kalex	18	+18.986	12	4
13	84	(Netherlands) Zonta van den Goorbergh	RW-Idrofoglia Racing GP	Kalex	18	+19.038	9	3
14	64	(Netherlands) Bo Bendsneyder	Pertamina Mandalika Gas Up Team	Kalex	18	+22.338	17	2
15	53	(Turkey) Deniz Öncü	Red Bull KTM Ajo	Kalex	18	+22.568	20	1
16	54	(Spain) Fermín Aldeguer	Sync Speed Up	Boscoscuro	18	+25.220	10	
17	81	(Australia) Senna Agius	Liqui Moly Husqvarna Intact GP	Kalex	18	+27.060	21	
18	15	(South Africa) Darryn Binder	Liqui Moly Husqvarna Intact GP	Kalex	18	+28.515	11	
19	71	(Italy) Dennis Foggia	Italtrans Racing	Kalex	18	+30.099	23	
20	14	(Italy) Tony Arbolino	Elf Marc VDS Racing Team	Kalex	18	+30.356	5	
21	12	(Czech Republic) Filip Salač	Elf Marc VDS Racing Team	Kalex	18	+41.203	19	
22	10	(Brazil) Diogo Moreira	Italtrans Racing	Kalex	18	+43.118	26	
23	20	(Andorra) Xavi Cardelús	Fantic Racing	Kalex	18	+43.185	27	
24	34	(Indonesia) Mario Aji	Idemitsu Honda Team Asia	Kalex	18	+43.259	28	
25	5	(Spain) Jaume Masià	Pertamina Mandalika Gas Up Team	Kalex	18	+43.623	22	
26	11	(Spain) Álex Escrig	Klint Forward Factory Team	Forward	17	+1 lap	24	
27	43	(Spain) Xavier Artigas	Klint Forward Factory Team	Forward	17	+1 lap	29	
Ret	28	(Spain) Izan Guevara	CFMoto Aspar Team	Kalex	12	Retirement	8	
Ret	22	(Japan) Ayumu Sasaki	Yamaha VR46 Master Camp Team	Kalex	6	Accident	25	
WD	96	(United Kingdom) Jake Dixon	CFMoto Aspar Team	Kalex		Withdrew		
Fastest lap: (Spain) Arón Canet (Kalex) – 1:56.788 (lap 3)
OFFICIAL MOTO2 RACE REPORT

- Jake Dixon was declared unfit after a crash during Saturday Free Practice 3 session and withdrew from the event

=== Moto3 ===
Pos.	No.	Rider	Team	Constructor	Laps	Time/Retired	Grid	Points
1	80	(Colombia) David Alonso	CFMoto Aspar Team	CFMoto	16	33:19.778	8	25
2	96	(Spain) Daniel Holgado	Red Bull GasGas Tech3	Gas Gas	16	+0.041	1	20
3	72	(Japan) Taiyo Furusato	Honda Team Asia	Honda	16	+0.143	18	16
4	54	(Italy) Riccardo Rossi	CIP Green Power	KTM	16	+0.186	7	13
5	95	(Netherlands) Collin Veijer	Liqui Moly Husqvarna Intact GP	Husqvarna	16	+0.338	10	11
6	82	(Italy) Stefano Nepa	LevelUp – MTA	KTM	16	+0.416	16	10
7	24	(Japan) Tatsuki Suzuki	Liqui Moly Husqvarna Intact GP	Husqvarna	16	+1.144	19	9
8	66	(Australia) Joel Kelso	Boé Motorsports	KTM	16	+9.465	6	8
9	48	(Spain) Iván Ortolá	MT Helmets – MSi	KTM	16	+10.019	2	7
10	12	(Australia) Jacob Roulstone	Red Bull GasGas Tech3	Gas Gas	16	+10.626	17	6
11	78	(Spain) Joel Esteban	CFMoto Aspar Team	CFMoto	16	+10.827	23	5
12	36	(Spain) Ángel Piqueras	Leopard Racing	Honda	16	+10.933	12	4
13	19	(United Kingdom) Scott Ogden	MLav Racing	Honda	16	+12.928	20	3
14	10	(Italy) Nicola Carraro	LevelUp – MTA	KTM	16	+12.946	22	2
15	58	(Italy) Luca Lunetta	Sic58 Squadra Corse	Honda	16	+13.527	14	1
16	64	(Spain) David Muñoz	Boé Motorsports	KTM	16	+15.953	13	
17	55	(Switzerland) Noah Dettwiler	CIP Green Power	KTM	16	+28.926	25	
18	70	(United Kingdom) Joshua Whatley	MLav Racing	Honda	16	+29.126	21	
19	5	(Thailand) Tatchakorn Buasri	Honda Team Asia	Honda	16	+34.620	24	
Ret	21	(Spain) Vicente Pérez	Red Bull KTM Ajo	KTM	15	Accident	9	
Ret	31	(Spain) Adrián Fernández	Leopard Racing	Honda	15	Accident	4	
Ret	6	(Japan) Ryusei Yamanaka	MT Helmets – MSi	KTM	14	Accident	15	
Ret	7	(Italy) Filippo Farioli	Sic58 Squadra Corse	Honda	4	Accident	11	
Ret	18	(Italy) Matteo Bertelle	Rivacold Snipers Team	Honda	4	Accident	5	
Ret	99	(Spain) José Antonio Rueda	Red Bull KTM Ajo	KTM	2	Accident	3	
WD	22	(Spain) David Almansa	Rivacold Snipers Team	Honda		Withdrew		
Fastest lap: (Japan) Tatsuki Suzuki (Husqvarna) – 2:03.135 (lap 3)
OFFICIAL MOTO3 RACE REPORT

- David Almansa suffered a fractured hand in a crash during Friday Practice 1 and withdrew from the event

== Championship standings after the race ==
Below are the standings for the top five riders, constructors, and teams after the round.

=== MotoGP ===
Riders' Championship standings

Pos.	Rider	Points
1	(Italy) Francesco Bagnaia	31
2	(South Africa) Brad Binder	29
3	(Spain) Jorge Martín	28
4	(Spain) Marc Márquez	18
5	(Italy) Enea Bastianini	15

Constructors' Championship standings

Pos.	Constructor	Points
1	(Italy) Ducati	37
2	(Austria) KTM	29
3	(Italy) Aprilia	15
4	(Japan) Yamaha	5
5	(Japan) Honda	4

Teams' Championship standings

Pos.	Team	Points
1	(Italy) Ducati Lenovo Team	46
2	(Italy) Gresini Racing MotoGP	31
3	(Austria) Red Bull KTM Factory Racing	29
4	(Italy) Prima Pramac Racing	28
5	(Italy) Aprilia Racing	22

=== Moto2 ===
Riders' Championship standings

Pos.	Rider	Points
1	(Spain) Alonso López	25
2	(Belgium) Barry Baltus	20
3	(Spain) Sergio García	16
4	(Japan) Ai Ogura	13
5	(Spain) Manuel González	11

Constructors' Championship standings

Pos.	Constructor	Points
1	(Italy) Boscoscuro	25
2	(Germany) Kalex	20

Teams' Championship standings

Pos.	Team	Points
1	(Spain) MT Helmets – MSi	29
2	(Italy) Sync Speed Up	25
3	(Netherlands) RW-Idrofoglia Racing GP	23
4	(Italy) QJmotor Gresini Moto2	19
5	(United States) OnlyFans American Racing Team	19

=== Moto3 ===
Riders' Championship standings

Pos.	Rider	Points
1	(Colombia) David Alonso	25
2	(Spain) Daniel Holgado	20
3	(Japan) Taiyo Furusato	16
4	(Italy) Riccardo Rossi	13
5	(Netherlands) Collin Veijer	11

Constructors' Championship standings

Pos.	Constructor	Points
1	(China) CFMoto	25
2	(Spain) Gas Gas	20
3	(Japan) Honda	16
4	(Austria) KTM	13
5	(Sweden) Husqvarna	11

Teams' Championship standings

Pos.	Team	Points
1	(Spain) CFMoto Aspar Team	30
2	(France) Red Bull GasGas Tech3	26
3	(Germany) Liqui Moly Husqvarna Intact GP	20
4	(Japan) Honda Team Asia	16
5	(France) CIP Green Power	13

Previous race: 2023 Valencian Grand Prix	FIM Grand Prix World Championship; 2024 season	Next race: 2024 Portuguese Grand Prix
Previous race: 2023 Qatar Grand Prix	Qatar motorcycle Grand Prix	Next race: 2025 Qatar Grand Prix
